= Bret Maverick: Faith, Hope and Clarity =

Bret Maverick: Faith, Hope, and Clarity starring James Garner is a two-part episode of the 1981-82 Western television series Bret Maverick edited together and released to local television stations as a TV movie. The show involves a religious cult that swindles the townspeople out of a tract of land. Maverick winds up straightening everything out. The episodes were directed by Leo Penn (father of Sean Penn) and the film is sometimes entitled simply Bret Maverick. The same thing was done with the two-hour series premiere, slightly condensed and marketed to television stations as Bret Maverick: The Lazy Ace. The Bret Maverick television series was a sequel to the 1957 series Maverick, created by Roy Huggins, in which Garner had played the same character two decades earlier.

== Cast ==
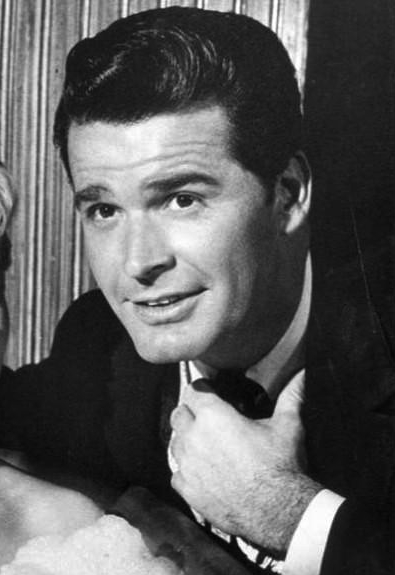
James Garner as Bret Maverick

- James Garner as Bret Maverick
- Ed Bruce as Tom Guthrie
- Ramon Bieri as Elijah Crow
- Richard Hamilton as Cy Whittaker
- David Knell as Rodney Catlow
- Darleen Carr as Mary Lou Springer
- Robert Webber as Everest Sinclair
- Marj Dusay as Kate Hanranhan
- James Staley as Brother Samuel Workman
- Simone Griffeth as Jasmine DuBois
- Tony Burton as Arthur
- Priscilla Morrill as Estelle Springer
- Richard Libertini as Fingers Wachefsky
- Jameson Parker as Whitney Delaworth III
- Stuart Margolin as Philo Sandeen

== See also ==
- Bret Maverick: The Lazy Ace
- Duel at Sundown (Maverick)
- Shady Deal at Sunny Acres
