= Duel at Sundown (Maverick) =

- Maverick episode
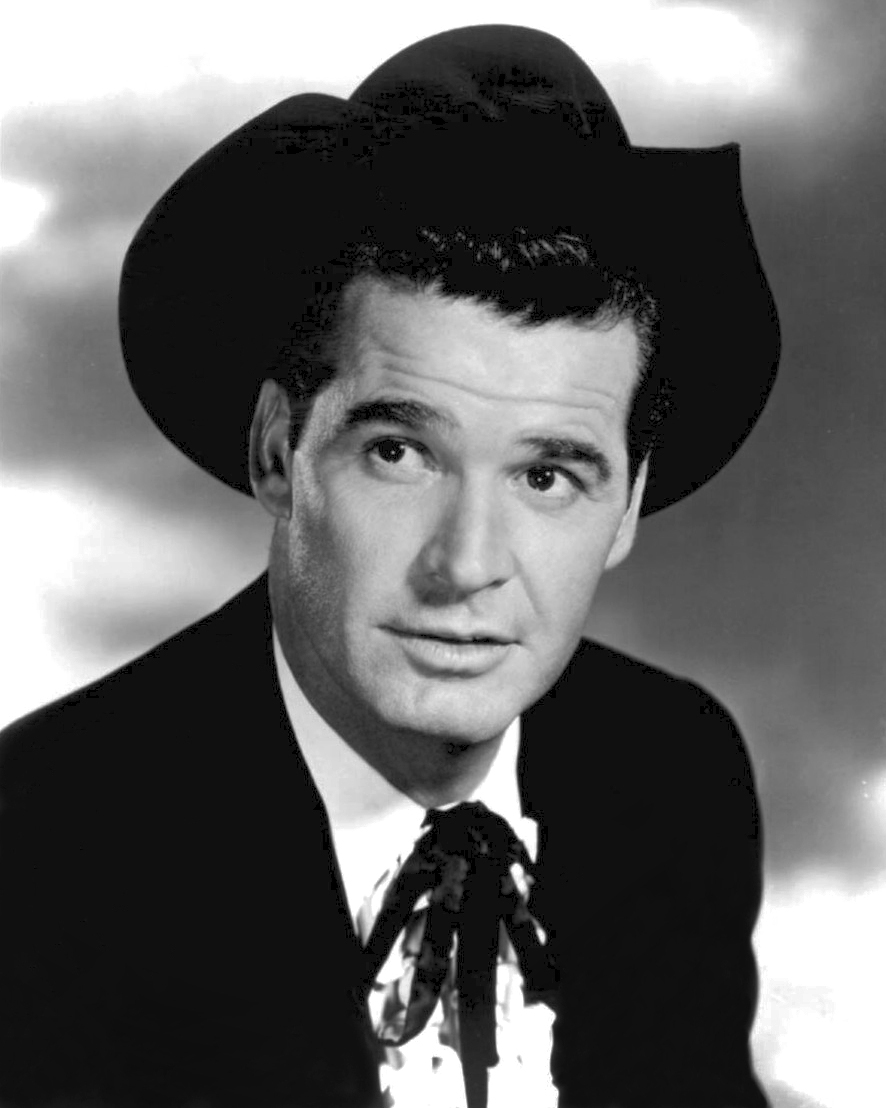
- James Garner as Bret Maverick
- Episode no.: Season 2 Episode 19
- Directed by: Arthur Lubin
- Story by: Howard Browne
- Teleplay by: Richard J. Collins
- Original air date: February 1, 1959

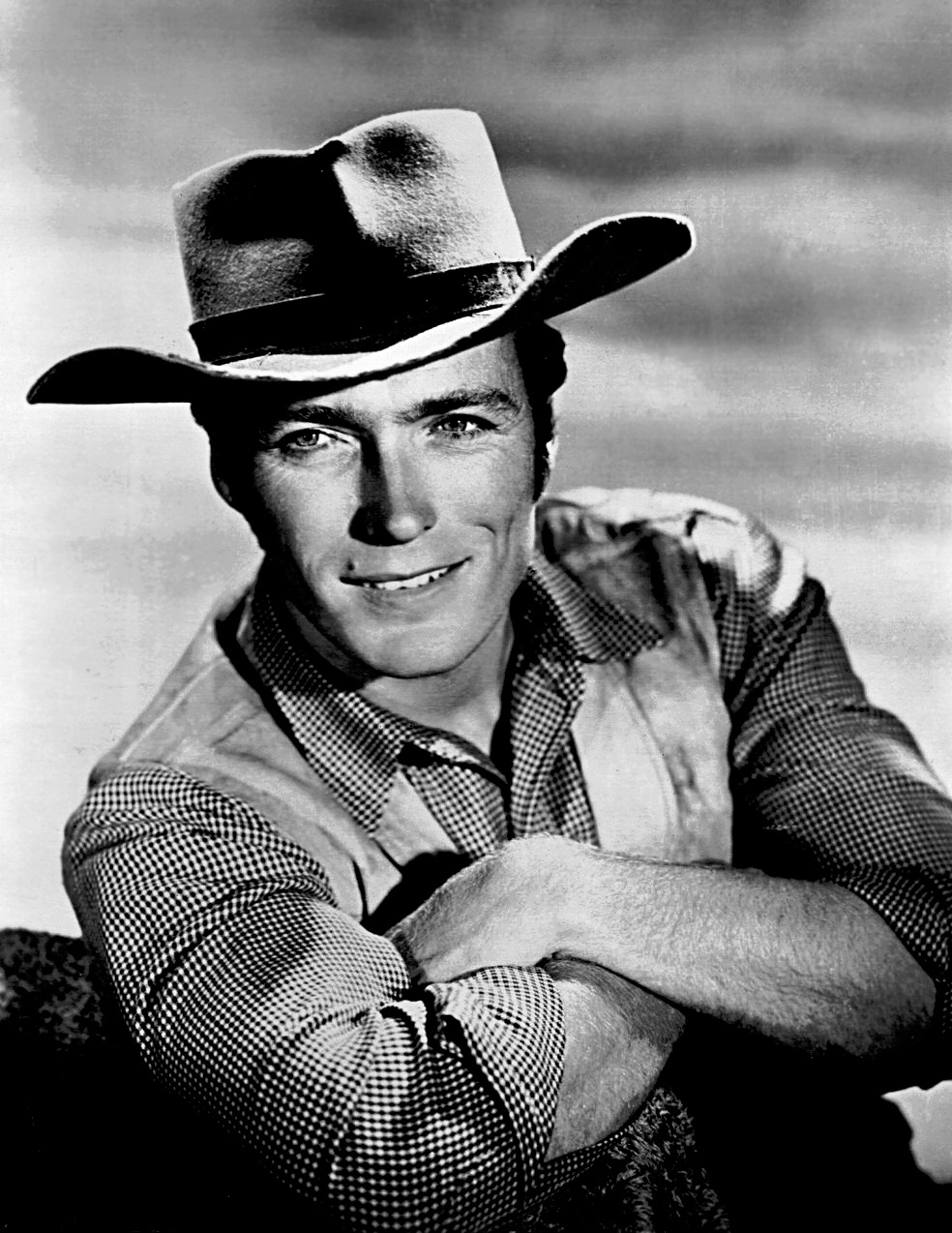
Clint Eastwood

"Duel at Sundown" is a 1959 episode of the Western comedy television series Maverick starring 31-year-old James Garner and 29-year-old Clint Eastwood. A mean fortune hunting bully (Eastwood) becomes jealous when Bret Maverick (Garner) begins spending time with his girlfriend Carrie (Abby Dalton), the daughter of Bret's old friend (Edgar Buchanan), who desperately wants Bret to marry her before Eastwood's evil character does so.

An epic fistfight between Garner and Eastwood segues into a surprising showdown between Bret and gunslinger John Wesley Hardin in which Maverick fans his pistol. "Hardin" turns out to be Bret's brother Bart (Jack Kelly), who'd been recruited to help frighten Eastwood's character who literally flees the town. Carrie realizes that she made a mistake in trying to love Hardigan and thanks Bret. As Bret and Bart depart the town on horseback at the episode's conclusion, they run into the real John Wesley Hardin, already angrily riding in to hunt down and murder the man who "killed" him. Eastwood is billed fifth in the cast but his onscreen time is as ample as anyone else's except Garner's. The episode was written by Richard J. Collins from a story by Howard Browne, and directed by Arthur Lubin. The episode has been released on the Blu-ray of the 1992 Clint Eastwood film, Unforgiven.

== Cast ==
James Garner ... Bret Maverick
Jack Kelly ... Bart Maverick
Edgar Buchanan ... Jed
Abby Dalton ... Carrie
Clint Eastwood ... Red Hardigan
Dan Sheridan ... Doc Baxter
James Griffith ... John Wesley Hardin
Clarke Alexander ... Sheriff
Linda Lawson ... Lily
Myrna Fahey ... Susie
Ed Reimers ... Announcer (voice)

== See also ==
- Shady Deal at Sunny Acres
- List of Maverick episodes
- Bret Maverick: Faith, Hope and Clarity
- Bret Maverick: The Lazy Ace
- Rawhide
- The Rockford Files
- Space Cowboys
