= Shady Deal at Sunny Acres =

- Maverick episode
- Brothers Bart (Jack Kelly) and Bret Maverick (James Garner) exchanging glances at the Hotel Sunny Acres.
- Episode no.: Season 2 Episode 10
- Directed by: Leslie H. Martinson
- Story by: Douglas Heyes
- Teleplay by: Roy Huggins
- Original air date: November 23, 1958

"Shady Deal at Sunny Acres", starring James Garner and Jack Kelly, remains one of the most famous and widely discussed episodes of the Western comedy television series Maverick. Written by series creator Roy Huggins (teleplay) and Douglas Heyes (story) and directed by Leslie H. Martinson, this 1958 second-season episode depicts gambler Bret Maverick (James Garner) being swindled by a crooked banker (John Dehner) after depositing the proceeds from a late-night poker game. He then surreptitiously recruits his brother Bart Maverick (Jack Kelly) and a host of other acquaintances to mount an elaborate sting operation to recover the money.

As Huggins noted during a lengthy discussion of the episode in his Archive of American Television interview, the first half of the 1973 movie The Sting seems based on Huggins' script. While Bart and all of the series' recurring characters join forces to energetically flim-flam the banker ("....if you can't trust your banker, who can you trust?"), Bret sits whittling in a rocking chair across the street from the bank every day, responding to the amused and patronizing queries of the local townspeople curious about how he plans to recover his money, "I'm working on it."

"Shady Deal at Sunny Acres" was generally the first episode that Garner mentioned in interviews.

The episode is also the only one featuring brief appearances by all five of the series' early semi-regular recurring characters: Efrem Zimbalist Jr. as Dandy Jim Buckley, Diane Brewster as Samantha Crawford, Leo Gordon as Big Mike McComb, Richard Long as Gentleman Jack Darby, and Arlene Howell as Cindy Lou Brown. It proved to be the final series appearance for both Samantha and Dandy Jim because they were each working full-time on new series, Zimbalist in 77 Sunset Strip and Brewster as the schoolteacher in Leave It to Beaver. Additionally, for Gentleman Jack and Cindy, it was their only appearance in an episode in which Bret also appeared, although they shared not a single scene with Bret—all their dealings on Maverick were with Bart.

== Cast ==
- James Garner as Bret Maverick
- Jack Kelly as Bart Maverick
- John Dehner as Bates the banker
- Efrem Zimbalist, Jr. as Dandy Jim Buckley
- Diane Brewster as Samantha Crawford
- Leo Gordon as Big Mike McComb
- Richard Long as Gentleman Jack Darby
- Arlene Howell as Cindy Lou Brown
- Regis Toomey as Ben Granville
- Karl Swenson as Sheriff Griffen
- Joan Young as Susan Granville
- Irving Bacon as Employee
- Val Benedict as Cowhand
- Earle Hodgins as Plunkett
- Jonathan Hole as Desk Clerk
- J. Pat O'Malley as Ambrose Callahan
- Syd Saylor as 1st Townsman
- Leon Tyler as Henry Hibbs
- Edwin Reimers as Announcer (voice)

== See also ==
- "Duel at Sundown"
- List of Maverick episodes
- Bret Maverick: The Lazy Ace
- The Rockford Files
