= The New Maverick =

1978 TV film

- DVD cover
- Genre: Western
- Written by: Juanita Bartlett
- Directed by: Hy Averback
- Starring: James Garner; Charles Frank; Jack Kelly; Susan Sullivan; Susan Blanchard; Eugene Roche
- Music by: John Rubinstein
- Country of origin: United States
- Original language: English

Production
- Executive producer: Meta Rosenberg
- Producer: Robert Foster
- Production locations: San Rafael Ranch State Park; Patagonia, Arizona; Sierrita Mountains; Sonoran Desert; Tucson Mountains; Ironwood Forest National Monument; Old Tucson - 201 S. Kinney Road, Tucson, Arizona
- Cinematography: Andrew Jackson
- Editors: Diane Adler; George R. Rohrs
- Running time: 92 minutes
- Production companies: Cherokee Productions; Warner Bros. Television

Original release
- Network: ABC
- Release: September 3, 1978

Related
- Maverick; Young Maverick

The New Maverick is a 1978 American Western television film based on the 1957–1962 series Maverick starring James Garner as Bret Maverick. The New Maverick also stars Charles Frank as newcomer cousin Ben Maverick (son of Beau Maverick), Jack Kelly as Bart Maverick, and Susan Sullivan as Poker Alice Ivers.

James Garner and Jack Kelly had been 29 and 30 years old, respectively, at the beginning of the original series and were 50 and 51 while filming The New Maverick. The TV-movie was a pilot for the series Young Maverick, which featured Frank and only lasted a few episodes. Directed by Hy Averback and written by Juanita Bartlett, the movie was filmed while Garner's series The Rockford Files was on hiatus. Garner would later star in Bret Maverick, another attempt at a series revival inspired by this TV-movie, for the 1981-82 season.

Garner wrote in his memoir that the film "didn't quite make it," calling it "a near miss."

== Cast ==
- James Garner as Bret Maverick
- Charles Frank as Ben Maverick
- Jack Kelly as Bart Maverick
- Susan Sullivan as Poker Alice
- Susan Blanchard as Nell McGarahan
- Eugene Roche as Austin Crupper
- George Loros as Vinnie Smith, Train Robber hired by Crupper
- Woodrow Parfrey as Leveque, Man from New Orleans
- Greg Allen as Dobie
- Helen Page Camp as Mrs. Flora Crupper
- Jack Garner as Homer, Vinnie's henchman
- Graham Jarvis as Undertaker Lambert
- Macon McCalman as Vanders the Las Vegas Hotel Desk Clerk
- B.J. Ward as B.J. Vinnie's Henchman
