= Susan Blanchard (actress) =

American actress

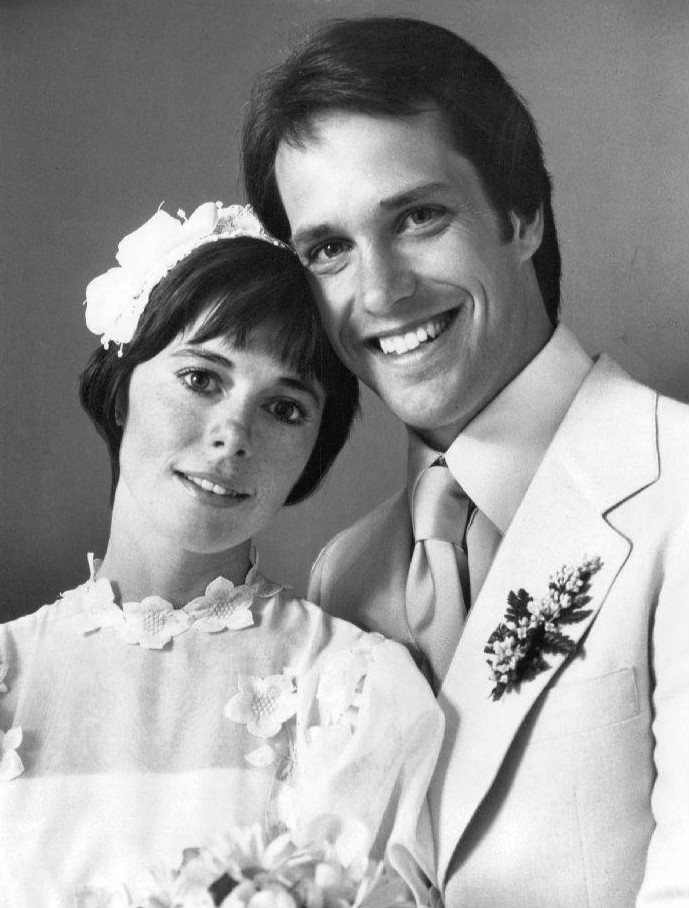
- Blanchard with future husband Charles Frank on All My Children, 1974
- Born: Westport, Connecticut, U.S.
- Occupation: Actress
- Spouse: Charles Frank (m. 1977)
- Children: 1

Susan Blanchard is an American actress, who is known for playing Mary Kennicott Martin on the soap opera All My Children from 1971 to 1975.

== Early life and education ==
Blanchard is a native of Westport, Connecticut. After an early desire to be a ballerina, she decided to become an actress. She attended Centenary College in New Jersey for two years before she sought a career in New York City.

== Career ==
She is married to actor Charles Frank, who played her onscreen husband Dr. Jeff Martin #2 on All My Children. They also worked together in 1978 on the TV movie The New Maverick with James Garner and Jack Kelly and the following year on the short-lived prime-time television western series Young Maverick, a sequel to the 1957 series Maverick.

Her film credits include Russkies (1987), again opposite her husband Charles Frank, and the John Carpenter films Prince of Darkness (1987) and They Live (1988). In 1976, she starred as Tina in the sitcom Mr. T and Tina.

Blanchard also played Nurse Sandra Cooper in the season 6 episode "Images" of M*A*S*H and had a recurring role as Maureen Mahaffey, a maid, in the series Beacon Hill. In an episode of Murder, She Wrote, she played Carolyn Hester Crane.

Blanchard appeared as the television commercial spokesperson for No Nonsense, a brand of pantyhose, from 1976 to 1982.

== Filmography ==
=== Film ===
Year	Title	Role	Notes
1987	Prince of Darkness	Kelly	
1987	Russkies	Mrs. V.	
1988	They Live	Ingenue	

=== Television ===
Year	Title	Role	Notes
1971	All My Children	Mary Kennicott	3 episodes
1975	How to Succeed in Business Without Really Trying	Rosemary	Television film
1975	Beacon Hill	Maureen Mahaffey	11 episodes
1975, 1978	Police Woman	June / Karen Kelley	2 episodes
1976	Mr. T and Tina	Tina Kelly	6 episodes
1977	The Magnificent Magical Magnet of Santa Mesa	Marcie Hamilton	Television film
1977	M*A*S*H	Nurse Cooper	Episode: "Images"
1978	The President's Mistress	Margaret 'Mugsy' Evans	Television film
1978	The New Maverick	Nell McGarrahan	Television film
1978, 1984	The Love Boat	Melanie Tate / Sarah Lambert	2 episodes
1979–1980	Young Maverick	Nell McGarrahan	8 episodes
1981	She's in the Army Now	Pvt. Virginia Marshall	Television film
1983	At Ease	Mrs. Gentry	Episode: "Prairie Moon Over Texas"
1983	Magnum, P.I.	Katherine Magnum	Episode: "Home from the Sea"
1984	Falcon Crest	Nurse Rogers	2 episodes
1985	Murder, She Wrote	Carolyn Hester Crane	Episode: "A Lady in the Lake"
1988	Houston Knights	Kitty Tucker	Episode: "Sins of the Father"
1988	Webster	Leading Lady	Episode: "Rich Man, Poor Man"
1989	Adventures in Babysitting	Joanna Anderson	Television film
