= John McLiam =

Canadian actor (1918–1994)

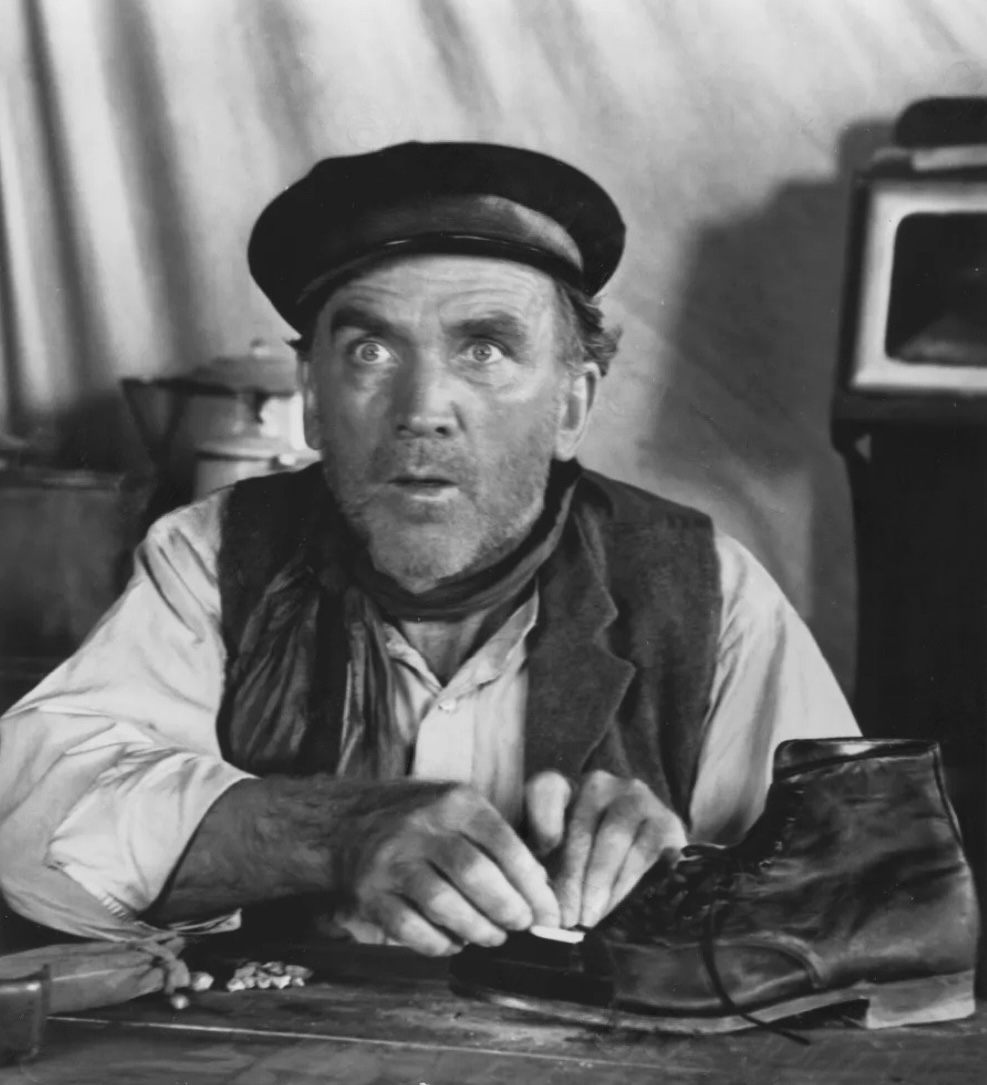
- McLiam in Death Valley Days (1970)
- Born: John Williams; January 24, 1918; Alberta, Canada
- Died: April 16, 1994 (aged 76); Woodland Hills, Los Angeles, California, U.S.
- Resting place: Santa Barbara Cemetery
- Occupation: Actor
- Years active: 1952–1991

John McLiam (born John Williams; January 24, 1918 – April 16, 1994) was a Canadian actor noted for his skill at different accents. His film appearances include My Fair Lady (1964), In Cold Blood (1967), John Frankenheimer's movie of The Iceman Cometh (1973), The Missouri Breaks (1976), and First Blood (1982). He was a guest star in numerous television series and wrote a Broadway play, The Sin of Pat Muldoon.

== Early life ==
He attended St. Mary's College of California (Moraga, California). During World War II he served in the United States Navy as an intelligence officer, having received a Bronze Star. After the war he worked briefly as a journalist for the San Francisco Examiner.

== Acting career ==
He took McLiam, the Gaelic form of his real surname Williams, as a stage name.

His acting career began in Maxwell Anderson's Winterset in San Francisco in 1946. After a few roles in plays in California he moved to New York. His first Broadway role was as a guard in Maxwell Anderson's Barefoot in Athens in 1951. His other stage roles include Shaw's Saint Joan, and Tiger at the Gates, Christopher Fry's version of a Jean Giraudoux play, which ran 1959–60 on Broadway. He appeared in the original Broadway cast of One More River (1960).

He moved to California in 1960 to work in film and television. His film roles included a cockney ne'er-do-well in My Fair Lady (1964), Boss Kean in Cool Hand Luke (1967), In Cold Blood (1967) as murder victim Herbert Clutter, John acted as the pilot/flight instructor for Aunt Bee in Season 8 of The Andy Griffith Show, "Aunt Bee's Big Moment" Halls of Anger (1970), Woody Allen's Sleeper (1973), rancher David Braxton in The Missouri Breaks (1976), and Orval in First Blood (1982). He played Jimmy Tomorrow in John Frankenheimer's American Film Theater movie of The Iceman Cometh (1973), alongside Fredric March, Lee Marvin, Robert Ryan and Jeff Bridges.

McLiam portrayed Ellis Carter, a young man seeking freedom from his domineering brother, in the 1961 episode "The Big Spender" of the television series Window on Main Street. He appeared in "The Wild Wild West" S3 E17 "The Night of the Headless Woman" as Tucker (1967).

In the 1979 television miniseries Freedom Road, he played Ulysses S. Grant. He appeared in several episodes of the western series The Virginian (one of which was in 1970 as Parker on "The Men From Shiloh" which was the rebranded name that year for The Virginian) and Gunsmoke, and was Doc Holliday in the pilot of Bret Maverick. He portrayed the lead character's father in T.J. Hooker, and as Elsworth Chisolm in two 1989 episodes of Dynasty after appearing five years prior as another character. In 1980, he played retired attorney Nathan Moore in an episode during the final season of The Waltons. He guest starred in a 1970 episode of Bonanza, three episodes of Little House on the Prairie (1977–1983), and in a two episodes of Highway to Heaven, all opposite Michael Landon. He had guest roles in dozens of other television series, including The Twilight Zone, Mannix, Magnum, P.I., M*A*S*H, Murder, She Wrote, The A-Team, and Perry Mason.

He was John of Gaunt in William Woodman's filmed version of Shakespeare's Richard II (1982): while the cast's acting was generally judged as poor, Charles R. Forker said McLiam delivered Gaunt's most famous speech "like an operatic aria" but in general was no match for Sir John Gielgud at speaking verse.

== Writing ==
His play The Sin of Pat Muldoon, about a Roman Catholic family, ran for five performances from March 13 to 16, 1957 at the Cort Theatre on Broadway. The central character, played in that production by James Barton, is a father who renounces his faith following the death of his son and spends his savings on partying and loose women before having a heart attack. Though he attempts to resolve some of his family's problems, he dies unrepentant. Playwright and producer Maxwell Anderson, given the script to consider producing it, condemned the play as lying on well-trampled ground following Seán O'Casey's Juno and the Paycock, declaring, "I've grown weary of the whole subject. An ancient, irritable, blasphemous, dying but loveable Irishman says his last ten thousand words and goes to his own place. The hell with him."

== Personal life ==
McLiam and his wife Roberta had a daughter, Claire. He died in Woodland Hills, Los Angeles, California in 1994 from melanoma and Parkinson's disease. McLiam was interred at the Santa Barbara Cemetery at Santa Barbara, California.

== Selected filmography ==
- 1957: Decoy as Mike, and as Father Kelly
- 1961: Dead to the World as Goody
- 1964: My Fair Lady as Harry (uncredited)
- 1965: Honey West (TV Series) as Gordon
- 1967: Cool Hand Luke as Boss Kean
- 1967: In Cold Blood as Herbert Clutter
- 1968: Madigan as Dunne (uncredited)
- 1968: Riverrun as Jeffries
- 1968: The Andy Griffith Show (TV Series) as Mac
- 1969: The Reivers as Van Tosch
- 1970: Halls of Anger as Boyd Wilkerson
- 1970: R. P. M. as Reverend Blauvelt
- 1970: Monte Walsh as Joe 'Fightin' Joe' Hooker
- 1971: Big Jake as Army Officer (uncredited)
- 1972: The Culpepper Cattle Co. as Thorton Pierce
- 1973: Showdown as F.J. Wilson
- 1973: The Iceman Cometh as Jimmy Tomorrow
- 1973: Sleeper as Dr. Agon
- 1974: The Dove as Lyle Graham
- 1975: Rafferty and the Gold Dust Twins as John Beachwood
- 1975: The Secret of the Pond as Uncle Ben
- 1975: Bite the Bullet as Gebhardt
- 1975: Lucky Lady as Rass Huggins
- 1976: The Missouri Breaks as David Braxton
- 1976: The Food of the Gods as Mr. Skinner
- 1979: Freedom Road as President Ulysses S. Grant
- 1979: Shadow of Fear as Isaac
- 1982: The End of August as Colonel
- 1982: First Blood as Orval Kellerman
- 1982: Voyager from the Unknown as Dr. Bernard
- 1987: Walk Like a Man as H.P. Truman
- 1988: Split Decisions as Pop McGuinn
