= Duel at Sundown =

Duel at Sundown may refer to:

- "Duel at Sundown" (Maverick), an episode of the American TV series Maverick
- Duel at Sundown (film), a 1965 Spaghetti Western
