= Charles Frank =

American actor (born 1947)

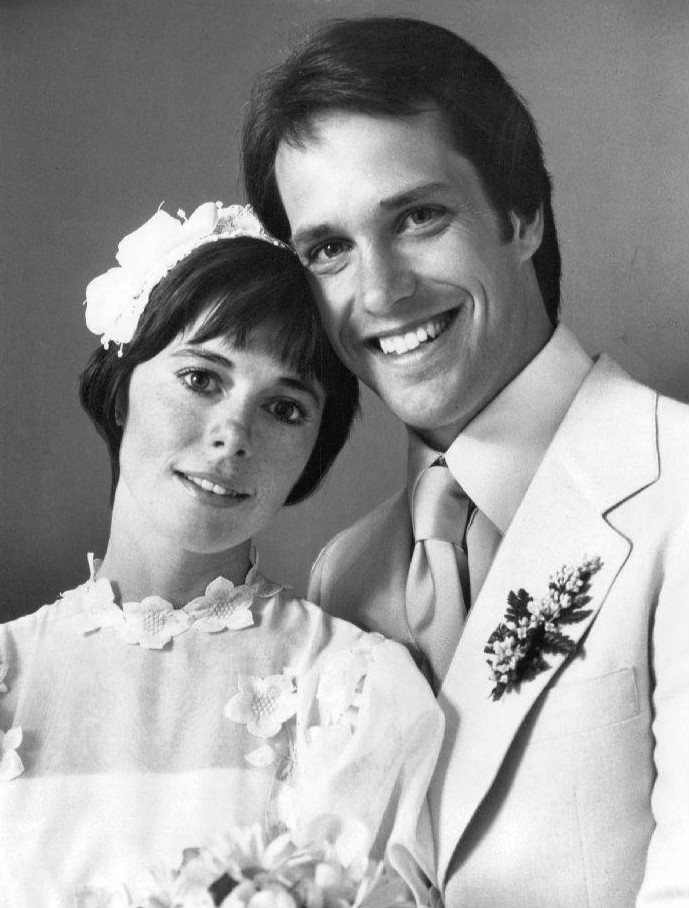
- Frank and Blanchard on All My Children, 1974
- Born: April 17, 1947 (age 79); Olympia, Washington, U.S.
- Occupation: Actor
- Spouse: Susan Blanchard (m. 1977)
- Children: 1

Charles Reser Frank (born April 17, 1947) is an American actor noted for playing Bret Maverick's cousin Ben Maverick in the 1978 TV movie The New Maverick with James Garner and Jack Kelly, and in the short-lived 1979 television series Young Maverick. Both featured Frank's real-life wife Susan Blanchard as Ben Maverick's girlfriend.

== Career ==
From 1970 to 1974 (and again in 1988 and 1995), Frank played Dr. Jeff Martin on the ABC soap opera All My Children.

He also appeared in two episodes of M*A*S*H and once on the CBS family drama, Three for the Road. In 1977, Frank costarred with Deborah Winters and Claude Akins in the television horror film, Tarantulas: The Deadly Cargo, directed by Stuart Hagmann. The same year, he played the murder victim in the Columbo episode entitled, "Try and Catch Me". Also in 1977, Frank played Todd Seymour in the Hawaii Five-O episode "Practical Jokes Can Kill You". In the second season of Barney Miller he appeared in the episode "Massage Parlor".

In 1979, he appeared as Lester Hackett in four episodes in the CBS miniseries The Chisholms; when the production resumed in 1980, he was replaced in the role by Reid Smith. In 1982, Frank portrayed independently wealthy Stanley Beck on the short lived series Filthy Rich, a comedic send-up of Dallas and Dynasty. He costarred with Dennis Weaver as Jack Warren in CBS's short-lived (1983–84) Emerald Point N.A.S..

Between 1977 and 1985, he made four appearances on The Love Boat. His first appearance as Jim Wright made him the first love interest for Julie on the series.

His film credits include The One and Only (1978), The Other Side of the Mountain Part 2 (1978) and Mrs. Delafield Wants to Marry (1986). In 1983 Frank played astronaut Scott Carpenter in the movie version of Tom Wolfe's novel The Right Stuff. He also appeared as the husband of his real-life wife Susan Blanchard in the 1987 film Russkies.

In 2004, Frank narrated C.S.A.: The Confederate States of America, a mockumentary based in an alternate timeline in which the Confederacy won the American Civil War.

== Personal life ==
On the set of All My Children Frank met his wife Susan Blanchard, who played his character's wife, Mary Kennicott Martin. They married in 1977 and have one child.
