= TV Reader's Digest =

American TV anthology series (1955–1956)

- Genre: Drama, Anthology
- Directed by: William Beaudine; John Brahm; Peter Godfrey (director); Phil Karlson; Arnold Laven; Ted Post
- Country of origin: United States
- Original language: English
- No. of seasons: 2
- No. of episodes: 39

Production
- Executive producer: Harry Joe Brown
- Production locations: Los Angeles, California, United States
- Running time: 25 minutes

Original release
- Network: ABC
- Release: January 17, 1955 – July 9, 1956

TV Reader's Digest is a 30-minute American television anthology drama series, which aired on ABC from January 17, 1955, to July 9, 1956. Its theme music was "Polonaise" from Act III of Eugene Onegin.

== Format ==
Based on articles that appeared in Reader's Digest magazine, the episodes were true stories that were varied in their themes, plots, and content. Themes included crime, heroism, mystery, romance, and human interest.

== Cast ==
Hugh Reilly was the initial host. He was succeeded by Gene Raymond in January 1956.

Some of the actors who were cast in the episodes include Chuck Connors, Peter Graves, Lee Marvin, Claude Akins, Leon Askin, Jean Byron, Marguerite Chapman, Rosemary DeCamp, Marilyn Erskine, John Howard, Vivi Janiss (as Mary Todd Lincoln in "How Chance Made Lincoln President"), Francis McDonald, Martin Milner, Jerry Paris, Gene Raymond, Max Showalter, and Michael Winkelman, and Joan Young. Clint Eastwood made his first Western appearance as Lt. Wilson in the episode "Cochise, Greatest of the Apaches", which aired January 30, 1956.

== Selected episodes ==
Partial List of Episodes of TV Reader's Digest
Date	Title	Actor(s)
January 17, 1955	"Last of the Old Time Shooting Sheriffs"	--
January 24, 1955	"Trouble on the Double"	Peter Graves, Nancy Gates
January 31, 1955	"The Most Unforgettable Character"	Martha Scott, Douglass Montgomery (Note: Scott plays the "unforgettable" Mrs. Robert Louis Stevenson and Montgomery, her husband.)
February 7, 1955	"How Chance Made Lincoln President"	Richard Gaines, Vivi Janiss
February 14, 1955	"I'd Pick More Daisies"	Richard Denning, Jeanne Cagney
February 21, 1955	"Top Secret"	--
February 28, 1955	"A Matter of Life or Death"	Bobby Driscoll, Minor Watson, Jimmy Ogg, Erville Anderson
March 7, 1955	"The End of Blackbeard the Pirate"	Jeff Morrow, Randy Farr, Keith Hitchcock
March 14, 1955	"The American Master Counterfeiters"	--
March 21, 1955	"America's First Great Lady"	Gloria Talbott
March 28, 1955	"The Manufactured Clue"	Chuck Connors, Paul Stewart, Douglas Spencer
April 4, 1955	"Incident on the China Coast"	Bob Bray, Ann Doran
April 11, 1955	"How Charlie Faust Won a Pennant for the Giants"	Lee Marvin, Alan Reed (Note: Marvin stars as the pre-World War I Major League pitcher Charlie Faust and veteran character actor Alan Reed portrays longtime New York Giants manager John McGraw.)
April 18, 1955	"Honeymoon in Mexico"	Richard Long, Merry Anders
April 25, 1955	"The Great Armored-Car Robbery"	--
May 2, 1955	"A Million Dollar Story"	Bill Bouchey, James Bell, Julie Bishop
May 9, 1955	"Dear Friends and Gentle Hearts"	Johnny Johnston, Joan Camden (Note: Portraying composer Stephen Foster and his soon-to-be bride Jane McDowell, the inspiration for "Jeannie With the Light Brown Hair'.)
May 16, 1955	"France's Greatest Detective"	--
May 23, 1955	"Around the Horn to Matrimony"	Robert Hutton, Donna Martell
May 30, 1955	"The Anatomy of Graft"	Gene Barry, Jaclynne Greene, Emerson Treacy
June 6, 1955	"Human Nature Through a Rear View Mirror"	--
June 13, 1955	"Mr. Pak Takes Over"	Philip Ahn, Kenneth Tobey
June 20, 1955	"My First Bullfight"	Jack Kelly
June 27, 1955	"Comrade Lindeman's Conscience"	--
July 4, 1955	"Six Hours of Surgery"	Walter Kingsford, Jerry Paris, Damian O'Flynn, Jean Byron
July 11, 1955	"The Baron and His Uranium Killing"	Marcel Dalio, Steven Geray
October 24, 1955	"Old Master Detective"	William Talman, Walter Kingsford, Jesse White
October 31, 1955	"The Archer-Shee Case"	--
November 7, 1955	"The Brainwashing of John Hays"	--
November 14, 1955	"The Making of a Submariner"	--
November 21, 1955	"The Voyage of Capt. Tom Jones, Pirate"	Louis Hayward
December 12, 1955	"Emergency Case"	--
January 2, 1956	"In the Eye of the Hurricane"	--
January 16, 1956	"The Man Who Beat Death"	--
January 23, 1956	"A Bell for Okinawa"	--
February 13, 1956	"Texas in New York"	Marilyn Erskine
February 27, 1956	"Case of the Uncertain Hand"	Marguerite Chapman
March 12, 1956	"Night Court"	--
April 23, 1956	"Uncle Sam's C-Men"	--
May 7, 1956	"The Old, Old Story"	Rosemary DeCamp
May 14, 1956	"Britain's Most Baffling Murder Case"	--
June 18, 1956	"Go Fight City Hall"	Gene Raymond, Jean Byron, Joan Young
June 25, 1956	"Family Reunion, U.S.A."	--

== Production ==
Chester Erskine created the show and was the producer. William Beaudine, Harry Horner, and William Seiter were the directors. Episode writers included Frank Gruber, Frederick Hazlitt Brennan, and Cleveland Amory. Studebaker-Packard initially sponsored the program, but the company's financial problems caused that relationship to end.

Erskine gained the rights to make the series after he went through every issue the magazine had published since 1928 to ensure that the TV series would reflect the magazine "as faithfully as possible".

The show replaced Soldier Parade. It was broadcast on Mondays from 8 to 8:30 p.m. Eastern time.

== Critical response ==
A review of the premiere episode in the trade publication Variety said that Erskine "appears to have successfully translated that human interest element that's made the Reader's Digest a literary phenom into television terms." It commended Gruber's writing and Beaudine's directing and described the cast as "excellent".

J. P. Shanley, writing in The New York Times, found the December 5, 1955, episode ("The Sad Death of a Hero", about the 1925 Scopes trial) to be "an uninspired presentation." Shanley wrote, "Douglass Dumbrille was effective as the uncompromising Fundamentalist Bryan." Carl Benton Reid "had some impressive moments" as Darrow, the review said. The main negative factor was introduction of "a side issue" about a journalist covering the trial and a teacher who influenced him.
