= Bret Maverick: The Lazy Ace =

1981 TV film

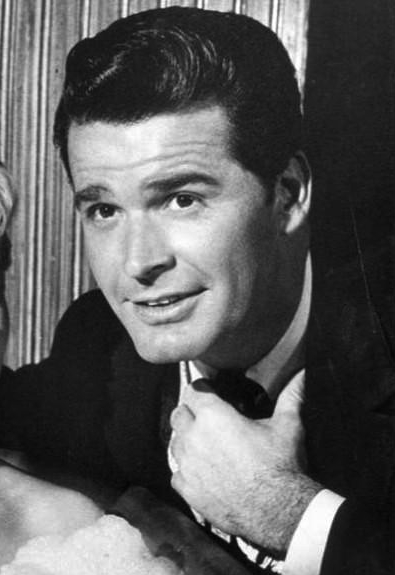
- James Garner as Maverick
- Genre: Drama; Western
- Written by: Gordon T. Dawson
- Directed by: Stuart Margolin
- Starring: James Garner
- Music by: Murray MacLeod; J.A.C. Redford
- Country of origin: United States
- Original language: English

Production
- Executive producer: Meta Rosenberg
- Producers: Gordon T. Dawson; Geoffrey Fischer; Mark Horowitz; Chas. Floyd Johnson
- Production locations: Sable Ranch - 25933 Sand Canyon Road, Santa Clarita, California; Stage 20 and 21, Warner Brothers Burbank Studios - 4000 Warner Boulevard, Burbank, California
- Cinematography: Andrew Jackson
- Editors: Diane Adler; George R. Rohrs
- Running time: 98 minutes
- Production company: Warner Bros. Television

Original release
- Network: NBC
- Release: December 1, 1981

Bret Maverick: The Lazy Ace is a 1981 American Western television film released as the 2-hour pilot episode of the series Bret Maverick, trimmed to a quicker pace and repackaged as a TV-movie for rerunning on local television stations. The 1981 show was based on the 1957 series Maverick, catching up with professional poker-player Bret Maverick (James Garner). The film, written by Gordon T. Dawson and directed by Stuart Margolin, occasionally appears under the simpler title Bret Maverick.

The real pilot, however, of both this series and the preceding CBS show Young Maverick, could be said to be the 1979 TV-movie The New Maverick, which featured both Garner as Bret and Jack Kelly as his brother Bart.

== Cast ==
- James Garner as Bret Maverick
- Ed Bruce as Sheriff Tom Guthrie
- Ramon Bieri as Elijah Crow
- Richard Hamilton as Cy Whittaker
- John Shearin as Sheriff Mitchel Dowd
- David Knell as Rodney Catlow
- Darleen Carr as Mary Lou Springer
- Janis Paige as Mandy Packer
- Bill McKinney as Ramsey Bass
- John McLiam as Doc Holliday, Card Player
- Stuart Margolin as Philo Sandeen
- Billy Kerr as Blue-Eyed Kid, Gunfighter
- Jack Garner as Jack, Red Ox Bartender
- Luis Delgado as Shifty Delgado
- Ed Bakey as Lyman Nickerson, Card Player
- Bill Cross as Dembro
- Richard Moll as Sloate
- Chuck Mitchell as Joe Dakota, Card Player
- Duane R. Campbell as Lucas, town drunk
- Ivan J. Rado as Wolfgang Mieter, Miner who tunneled into Bank
- David H. Banks as Delta Fox, Card Player
- Tommy Bush as Deputy Sturgess
- Ruth Estler as Townswoman
- Norman Merrill Jr. as Bank Teller
- Al Berry as Townsman
- Kirk Cameron as Boy #1
- Max Martini as Boy #2 (billed as Max Martin)

== Plot ==
Bret Maverick wins a saloon in a poker game and decides to end his roving ways and settle down in Sweetwater, Arizona. He takes on as a partner the former sheriff who comes with a shady background.

Doc Holliday had been a semi-regular character on the original Maverick series, showing up twice in season 1 (played by Gerald Mohr as a serious, no-nonsense killer), and five times in seasons 4 and 5 (played by Peter Breck as a flighty, somewhat unstable con man and schemer). Here he is played by John McLiam as an old friend and fellow gambler who appears to be near the end of his life, but is looking for that one last big score. The real Doc Holliday died at the age of 36; McLiam was 63 at the time of the filming of this episode.
