= Joan Young (American actress) =

American actress (1937–1985)

- Born: Joan Kathryn Young; July 26, 1937; Oregon, U.S.
- Died: May 31, 1985 (aged 47); Los Angeles, California, U.S.
- Education: Couch Grade School; Jefferson High School
- Occupation: Actress
- Years active: 1955–1979
- Spouse(s): Walter Maslow (m. 1961; div. ?)

Joan Kathryn Young (July 26, 1937 – May 31, 1985) was an American actress and voice dubber, best known for her featured guest appearances on two TV westerns; first, in "The Murderous Sutton Gang", the much-publicized premiere of the short-lived series, The Rough Riders, and next, "Shady Deal at Sunny Acres", one of the most widely discussed and influential episodes of the popular comedy-western, Maverick.

== Early life and career ==
Young was born in Oregon on July 26, 1937, the younger of two children born to Granite County, Montana native Julia F. Young, née Westin. (The elder, John Ireland, was the child of Westin and her first husband, Harold F. Ireland, since deceased). Her parents divorced shortly after her birth, and Young was raised by her mother, first in Seattle, then Los Angeles, and, finally, Portland, Oregon, where, in July 1951, The Oregon Daily Journal published a captioned photo depicting the "prize[-winning] acrobatic novelty number" performed by Young at Oaks Amusement Park. Settling in Portland, she attended Couch Grade School and later Jefferson High, She also studied for three years at the local Fred Astaire Dance Studios affiliate, by virtue of a scholarship awarded when she won a talent contest staged by the organization in October 1953. The following summer, Young was one of the seven top finishers in Ted Mack state fair talent contest. During her senior year at Jefferson, Young was cast as the lead in a production of Alice in Wonderland; she also gave well-received performances in Oumansky Magic Ring Theatre productions of Hamlet—as Ophelia—and Late Love as Janet Colby, one of the play's secondary romantic leads, alongside Oumansky veteran Rod Barrows. (Note: In the role created on Broadway the previous year by Elizabeth Montgomery, alongside Cliff Robertson.) (Note: As Oregonian reviewer B. Mike—aka Francis Seward Murphy—confessed in the next edition of his column "Behind the Mike", it was precisely due to the remarkable authenticity of the recently discovered 17-year-old's portrayal of the 20-year-old Janet Colby that his subsequent review—unreservedly glowing though it was—had regrettably conflated the name of the character played with that of the young Miss Young.)

Following her graduation in 1955, Young and her mother moved to Hollywood, leading to uncredited appearances in the dramatic series Big Town, as well as the westerns, Cheyenne, Man Without a Gun, and Bronco, and sitcoms such The Gale Storm Show and Bringing Up Buddy.

In a June 1956 episode of TV Reader's Digest, Young and Chet Marshall portrayed Kitty and Ted Whitman, teenage offspring of a crusading suburbanite—played by series host Gene Raymond—gearing up to "Go Fight City Hall".

In November 1958, Young was featured in a brief but key role in the famous Maverick episode, "Shady Deal at Sunny Acres". As Susan Granville, daughter of Ben Granville, the soon-to-be ousted partner of crooked banker John Bates (whose bald-faced embezzlement of $15,000 entrusted to him by Bret Maverick is the "shady deal" that promptly plants Bret in his nearly episode-long rocking chair perch while simultaneously bringing his formidable band of associates into play), she is the first of Bret's many visitors—indeed, the first character whatsoever—to say that she believes Bret's claim, quickly adding that she utterly distrusts Bates, is deeply concerned for the well-being of her father and the people of Sunny Acres, and urges Bret to remember her should he require assistance of any kind. All of which prompts Bret to respond, "Susan, I'll never forget you."

Young spent the better part of the next four years in Europe, engaged primarily in providing English-language voice dubbing for French and Italian films destined for American TV. She also appeared, uncredited, in two films shot in Italy, most notably as Kirk Douglas's nurse—and romantic interest—during the early scenes of Two Weeks in Another Town. Or, at least, so she appears to have been prior to drastic cuts ordered by MGM studio head Joseph Vogel, who had suddenly decided during post-production to somehow fashion a "family picture" out of what Douglas later recalled, bitterly, had been shot as both a "very meaningful, dramatic film [and a] very sexy [one], with wild scenes." "The only thing I enjoyed about the film," recalled Young in 1974, "was that I spent two days kissing Kirk Douglas. But they cut that part to death." (What remains of Young's Two Weeks work comprises the film's first full-fledged dialogue scene, opposite Douglas, immediately following David Raksin's roughly 3½-minute opening music cue.)

Likewise shredded were Young's final two feature film appearances, for which she again "don[s] the white uniform". 1963's Tammy and the Doctor affords Young "a fair-sized part", which, much like its predecessor, was "cut to death". Regarding 1964's The New Interns, Young spoke shortly after the film's release with Oregonian entertainment writer Arnold Marks. After establishing that the character assigned Young—identified by IMDb only as Alice March—is a "female doctor", Marks quotes Young directly. "I haven't seen the film as yet," she confessed, "but they tell me that two of my three big scenes were cut!" (Note: Repeated viewings of the finished film suggest that Young's source was being less than candid. Not a single scene involving Young, big or small, appears to have survived the final cut. Moreover, no trace whatsoever remains of any female doctor (much less one named March), nor of any character addressed—or otherwise identified—as Alice March. Nor, for that matter, of any performer resembling Young as she appears in any of the previously cited Youtube uploads or newspaper photos.)

In January 1974, a profile/interview published in the Honolulu Star-Bulletin revealed that Young, then appearing as Julia in the Hawaii Performing Arts Company revival of Edward Albee's A Delicate Balance, had moved to Hawaii the previous year, resulting in at least one appearance on The Brian Keith Show. Another notable credit facilitated by her newfound proximity was "The Hostage", a March 1975 episode of Hawaii Five-0, in which the actress, credited as Joan K. Young, portrays Emily Martin.

In 1979, Young made her final screen appearance as the NASA technician in "Golden Target", a two-part episode of the Andy Griffith science fiction series Salvage 1.

== Personal life and death ==
On February 14, 1961, Young married actor Walter Maslow in Rome, where he had just completed his scenes for the film Francis of Assisi, and where she and he would soon begin work on the film Barabbas, resulting in uncredited appearances by each. Subsequently, each took on one additional Italy-based job—Maslow on The Reluctant Saint, Young on Two Weeks in Another Town—prior to returning to the States. It is not known when exactly this marriage went bad, nor even whether it survived the remainder of their extended but only briefly shared time abroad. Whatever the case, when Young's return was reported by Variety in 1962, no mention was made of marriage, nor Maslow. Likewise, no mention of matrimony, past or present, is to be found in the brief Joan Young refresher course penned by Oregon columnist Arnold Marks in February 1965. For his part, Maslow had, by 1967, remarried.

Young died on May 31, 1985, in Los Angeles, aged 47.

== Filmography ==
- Big Town
  - Season 6 Unknown episode (1955)
- TV Reader's Digest
  - Season 2 Episode 36 "Go Fight City Hall" (1956) – Kitty Whitman
- The Gale Storm Show
  - Season 1 Unknown episode (1956)
- The Unguarded Moment (1956) – Cellist in Conway's orchestra class (uncredited)
- The Careless Years (1957) – Attentive Student During Washington-Crossing-the-Delaware Anecdote (uncredited)
- Voice in the Mirror (1958) – New Tenant Burton tries to bum money from (uncredited)
- The Rough Riders
  - Season 1 Episode 1 "The Murderous Sutton Gang" (1958) - Jamie Buckley
- Maverick
  - "Shady Deal at Sunny Acres" (1958) – Susan Granville
- Bringing Up Buddy
  - Season 1 Episode 6 "Nephew for Sale" (1960) Unknown role
- Barabbas (1961) – Disciple (uncredited)
- Two Weeks in Another Town (1962) – Tina, Sanitarium Nurse (uncredited)
- Dr. Kildare
  - Season 3 Episode 3 "If You Can't Believe the Truth" (1963) – Lucy Webber
- Tammy and the Doctor (1963) — Nurse (uncredited)
- The New Interns (1964) – Alice
- Ben Casey
  - Season 4 Episode 25 "Three Li'l Lambs" (1965) – Orin's Girlfriend (uncredited)
- The Brian Keith Show
  - Season 2 Episode 5 "Inflation" (1973) – Mrs. Barnes
- Hawaii Five-0
  - Season 7 Episode 22 "Hostage" (1975) – Emily Martin (as Joan K. Young)
- Salvage 1
  - Season 1 Episode 6 "Golden Orbit: Part 1" (1979) – NASA Technician
  - Season 1 Episode 7 "Golden Orbit: Part 2" (1979) – NASA Technician

In addition to appearances listed above, Young, at dates unknown, appeared uncredited in at least one episode each of Cheyenne (1955–1962), Man Without a Gun (1957–1959), and Bronco (1958–1962).
