= Young Maverick =

- Release poster
- Genre: Western; Comedy
- Developed by: Juanita Bartlett
- Directed by: Bernard McEveety; Don McDougall; Leslie H. Martinson; Hy Averback; Ralph Senensky; Bob Claver; Hollingsworth Morse
- Starring: Charles Frank; Susan Blanchard
- Theme music composer: David Buttolph
- Country of origin: United States
- Original language: English
- No. of seasons: 1
- No. of episodes: 8 (list of episodes)

Production
- Executive producer: Robert Van Scoyk
- Producer: Chuck Bowman
- Production location: California
- Running time: 60 minutes
- Production company: Warner Bros. Television

Original release
- Network: CBS
- Release: November 28, 1979 – January 30, 1980

Young Maverick is a 1979 Western television series and a sequel to the 1957–1962 series Maverick, which had starred James Garner as roving gambler Bret Maverick. Charles Frank played Ben Maverick, the son of Bret's first cousin Beau Maverick, making him Bret's first cousin once removed. Frank's real-life wife Susan Blanchard played his girlfriend Nell, while John Dehner (a frequent guest-star in various roles in several Maverick episodes including "Shady Deal at Sunny Acres") appeared as a frontier marshal who had arrested Ben's father Beau decades before. The series was cancelled by CBS after six hour-long episodes had been shown, leaving two which were never aired on the network. All eight episodes were screened later that year on BBC1 in the UK.

The 1978 TV-movie The New Maverick, featuring Garner as Bret, Frank as Ben, Jack Kelly as Bret's brother Bart Maverick, and Blanchard as Nell, served as the pilot for the series. Kelly did not appear in the series Young Maverick, although the character of Bret Maverick was featured in the opening minutes of the first episode "Clancy".

Among the actors appearing on Young Maverick were Howard Duff, John McIntire, James Woods, Donna Mills (all in "Dead Man's Hand," Parts 1 and 2), J. Pat O'Malley ("A Fistful of Oats"), Morgan Fairchild, John Hillerman (both "Makin' Tracks") and Harry Dean Stanton. Roger Moore, who played Beau Maverick (Ben's father) in the original series, never appeared in Young Maverick. Despite the title, Frank was three years older than Garner had been at the launch of the original series.

== Cast ==
- Charles Frank as Ben Maverick
- Susan Blanchard as Nell McGarrahan
- John Dehner as Marshall Edge Troy

== Episode list ==
No.	Title	Directed by	Written by	Original release date
1	"Clancy"	Bernard McEveety	David E. Peckinpah	November 28, 1979
2	"A Fistful of Oats"	Norm Liebmann	Don McDougall	December 5, 1979
3	"Hearts O' Gold"	Leslie H. Martinson	Robert van Scoyk	December 12, 1979
4	"Dead Man's Hand: Part 1"	Hy Averback	Robert van Scoyk	December 26, 1979
5	"Dead Man's Hand: Part 2"	Hy Averback	Robert van Scoyk	January 2, 1980
6	"Makin' Tracks"	Ralph Senensky	Norm Liebmann	January 9, 1980
7	"Have I Got a Girl for You"	Bob Claver	Jerry Ross	January 16, 1980
8	"Half-Past Noon"	Hollingsworth Morse	Lois Hire	January 30, 1980

== Home media ==
The series was released on DVD on March 1, 2016, under the Warner Archive label.
