= Jack Garner =

American actor (1926–2011)

- Born: Jack Edward Bumgarner; September 19, 1926; Norman, Oklahoma, U.S.
- Died: September 13, 2011 (aged 84); Rancho Mirage, California, U.S.
- Occupation: Actor
- Years active: 1971–2011
- Relatives: James Garner (brother)

Jack Edward Garner (né Bumgarner; September 19, 1926 – September 13, 2011) was an American golf pro and part-time actor. He was the elder brother of James Garner.

== Early life and career ==
Garner was born in Norman, Oklahoma, the son of Mildred Scott (née Meek) and Weldon Warren "Bill" Bumgarner. He was the second of three boys including actor James Garner (youngest) and Charles Bumgarner (oldest). The family operated a general store on Denver Corner in eastern Norman. The boys were sent to live with relatives after their mother died, while Garner's father remarried several times.

Garner was a star athlete at Norman High School, playing on the state championship basketball team in 1945. He pitched for a minor league baseball team affiliated with the Pittsburgh Pirates,. then worked for several golf courses in Florida. Years later, brother James wrote about Jack's athletic abilities in his memoir: "At Norman High, he was a point guard on a championship basketball team and quarterbacked an all-state football team...But his best sport was baseball: Jack was a pitcher in the Pittsburgh Pirates organization for 11 years. He was a better athlete than I was and a lot more outgoing. I was always in his footsteps."

Garner became a longtime member of the Professional Golfers' Association, played competitively, and later became a golf pro, coaching at Oakmont Country Club in Glendale, California, and elsewhere. Garner taught Dan Aykroyd, co-star with James in the 1996 film My Fellow Americans, to properly swing a golf club for a scene in the movie.

Garner was a practicing Methodist and a registered Democrat.

== Acting ==
Jack and James eventually moved to Los Angeles to reconnect with their father, who had relocated to southern California. Both changed their names to Garner after the move west. The third brother, Charles Bumgarner, who died in 1984 at the age of 60, remained in Norman and became a school administrator. Jack Garner entertained as the lead singer for the Coconut Grove nightclub, located in the now defunct Ambassador Hotel in Los Angeles early in his career.

Garner began acting in television during the late 1960s. His roles included guest appearances on Love, American Style; The Bionic Woman; The Doris Day Show; Daniel Boone; The Green Hornet; Mannix; Medical Center and Murder, She Wrote. He appeared in The Rockford Files in more than twenty episodes of the show, usually in bit roles, though he assumed the recurring supporting role of the indecisive, fence-sitting Captain McEnroe in the show's final season. Garner later appeared in Bret Maverick portraying Jack the Bartender from 1981 to 1982. Garner reprised his Rockford Files role of McEnroe in a series of television movies based on the series from 1996 to 1999.

Garner's film roles included Wild Rovers in 1971, Maverick in 1994, My Fellow Americans in 1996 and Sunset in 1988.

== Death ==
Garner suffered a fall in September 2011, which resulted in a broken hip. Doctors determined that his heart was not strong enough to withstand surgery to repair the hip so Garner was transferred to a facility for long-term care. However, his condition suddenly worsened within one week. Garner died at a hospice in Rancho Mirage, California, near his home in Palm Desert, on September 13, 2011, six days shy of his 85th birthday. He was survived by his former wife, Betty Bumgarner; his daughter, Liz Bumgarner, and son-in-law, Don Dykstra (they have no children); and younger brother, James Garner. His memorial service was held at the Wiefels Mortuary in Palm Springs, California.

== Selected filmography ==
Film
Year	Title	Role	Notes
1971	Wild Rovers	Cap Swalling	
1988	Sunset	Cowboy Henry	
1996	My Fellow Americans	President Haney's Caddy	

TV
Year	Title	Role	Notes
1971–1972	Nichols	Van Vechyen	2 episodes
1974	The Rockford Files	Capt. McEnroe, Sheriff Delbert Bassett, various other supporting roles	Credited and uncredited
1974	Emergency!	Gambler	1 episode (Propinquity)
1981–1982	Bret Maverick	Jack the bartender	All 18 episodes of the show
1991	Man of the People	Bernie	2 episodes
1995	Streets of Laredo	Old Waiter in Café	
