= Richard Hamilton (actor) =

American actor (1920–2004)

- Richard Hamilton in the role of Whitney Munson, a guest star on the first season of HBO prison drama Oz
- Born: December 31, 1920; Chicago, Illinois, U.S.
- Died: December 21, 2004 (aged 83); Catskill Mountains, New York, U.S.
- Occupation: Actor
- Years active: 1945–2002
- Spouse: Marilyn Morgan Hamilton

Richard Hamilton (December 31, 1920 – December 21, 2004) was an American film, television, theatre and radio actor. He acted in over seventy radio, movie and television roles.

== Early life and education ==
Born in Chicago, Illinois, Hamilton was raised in California where he attended Pasadena Junior College and the Pasadena Playhouse while working in west coast radio, before moving to New York City to perform on Broadway.

== Career ==
=== Theatre ===
On and off-Broadway, Hamilton performed in award-winning productions of Sam Shepard's Buried Child as Dodge, and Morning's at Seven as Carl. He was an active member of The Players club.

=== Radio ===
He performed various roles in the science fiction radio series X Minus One

=== Film ===
Hamilton appeared in Clint Eastwood's 1985 film Pale Rider, and in Men in Black (1997) as Tommy Lee Jones's first partner. Other film appearances include The Hospital (1971), Resurrection (1980), Arthur (1981), Protocol (1984), In Country (1989), Sommersby (1993), On Deadly Ground (1994), and Death to Smoochy (2002).

=== Television ===
His television film appearances include F.D.R.: The Last Year (1980), Riviera (1987), the ABC science fiction film Plymouth (1991), and The Yearling (1994). He had a recurring role as Cy Whittaker in the 1981 television series Bret Maverick, and played Big Willy in an episode of Frasier (1996). Other series appearances include Naked City (1963), St. Elsewhere (1983), two episodes of the original 1980s series The Equalizer (1986, 1989), three episodes of Law & Order (1991–1996), Picket Fences (1996), Oz (1997), and Spin City (1998).

== Personal life and death ==
Hamilton was married to Marilyn Morgan Hamilton and had a daughter and son. Hamilton died at his home in the Catskill Mountains on December 21, 2004, at age 83.

== Filmography ==
=== Film ===
Year	Title	Role	Notes
1963	Ladybug Ladybug	JoAnn's Father	
1969	Trilogy	Man in Automat	Segment: "Miriam"
1971	The Hospital	Dr. Ronald Casey	
1976	One Summer Love	Old Car Man	Original title: Dragonfly
1980	Resurrection	Earl Carpenter	
1981	Arthur	Bill	
1982	I'm Dancing as Fast as I Can	Joe	
1983	Silkwood	Georgie	
1984	Protocol	Mr. Davis	
1985	Heaven Help Us	Grandpa	
1985	The Sure Thing	Bartender	
1985	Pale Rider	Jed Blankenship	
1987	Ironweed	Donovan	
1989	In Country	Grampaw	
1992	Mo' Money	Judge Harold Lake	
1993	Sommersby	Doc Evans	
1993	The Paint Job	Robert	
1994	On Deadly Ground	Hugh Palmer	
1997	Men in Black	Agent D (K's first Partner)	
1997	Home Alone 3	Cab driver	
1998	Zack and Reba	Coach Burns	
1998	Reach the Rock	Ed	
1998	Angels in the Attic	Bomb Technician	
1999	Message in a Bottle	Chet	
2002	Death to Smoochy	Vagrant	(final film role)

=== Television ===
Richard Hamilton television credits
Year	Title	Role	Notes	Ref.
1963	Naked City	Philip Hames	1 episode	
1980	F.D.R.: The Last Year	Robert Hanagan	TV movie	
1981–1982	Bret Maverick	Cy Whittaker	18 episodes	
1983	St. Elsewhere	Arthur Schaeffer	1 episode	
1986	The Equalizer	Otis Hendricks	Episode: "Breakpoint" (S1.E19)	
1987	Riviera	Kennedy	TV movie	
1989	The Equalizer	Frank	Episode: "The Caper" (S4.E18)	
1991	Plymouth	Mayor Wendell Mackenzies	TV movie	
1991	Law & Order	Ed Conover	Episode: "In Memory Of"	
1993	Law & Order	CPO James Hagen	Episode: "Conduct Unbecoming"	
1994	The Yearling	Pa Forrester	TV movie	
1996	Law & Order	James "Jimmy the Pin" Poulos	Episode: "Double Blind"	
1996	Frasier	Big Willy	1 episode	
1996	Picket Fences	Mr. Hoffstetter	1 episode	
1997	Oz	Whitney Munson	1 episode	
1998	Spin City	Alfred	1 episode	
