= Ed Reimers =

American actor (1912–2009)

- Ed Reimers in Star Trek 1967
- Born: Edwin W. Reimers; October 26, 1912; Moline, Illinois
- Died: August 16, 2009 (aged 96); Saratoga Springs, New York
- Occupation: Actor

Edwin W. Reimers (October 26, 1912 – August 16, 2009) was an American actor active during the 1950s and 1960s, who also served as the stentorian-voiced announcer for such early Warner Brothers television series as Cheyenne and Maverick: "From the entertainment capital of the world, produced for television by Warner Brothers." Then he would recite the title and cast: "Maverick! Starring Jack Kelly and Roger Moore!"

== Early years ==
Reimers was born in Moline, Illinois.

== Military service ==
During World War II, Reimers served with the U.S. Marines in the Pacific.

== Career ==
After being a radio announcer in the 1930s, Reimers worked as a newscaster at KTTV in Los Angeles. He also was host of Movieland Matinee on KTTV.

Reimers narrated several episodes of the first Brian Keith series, Crusader, which aired on CBS from 1955 to 1956 and was one of three announcers during the 12-year run of Pantomime Quiz on television.

Reimers was also the original announcer for Do You Trust Your Wife? when Edgar Bergen hosted, but was replaced by Bob LeMond in the fall of 1956. He appeared as Admiral Fitzpatrick in 1967 in the Star Trek: The Original Series episode "The Trouble with Tribbles" and also reprised the pivotal role via archival footage in the Star Trek: Deep Space Nine episode "Trials and Tribble-ations".

Reimers is perhaps best known, though, as spokesman for the Allstate Corporation in their long-running series of television commercials in the United States, advising viewers that they were "in good hands with Allstate." Reimers was the TV spokesman for Allstate for 22 years, from 1957 until 1979.

Reimers was also a popular narrator of industrial films, especially those made by Lockheed Space and Missile Systems Division, Sunnyvale, California, and by the Aerojet-General Corporation Solid Rocket Plant in Sacramento, California.

Reimers was a native of Moline, Illinois, and died on 16 August 2009 in Saratoga Springs, New York.
