= Bret Maverick =

- Genre: Western; Comedy
- Developed by: Gordon Dawson
- Starring: James Garner; Ed Bruce; Ramon Bieri; John Shearin; David Knell; Richard Hamilton; Stuart Margolin; Darleen Carr
- Country of origin: United States
- Original language: English
- No. of seasons: 1
- No. of episodes: 18 (list of episodes)

Production
- Production location: California
- Running time: 60 minutes
- Production company: Warner Bros. Television

Original release
- Network: NBC
- Release: December 1, 1981 – May 4, 1982

Related
- Maverick; The New Maverick; Young Maverick; Maverick

Bret Maverick is an American Western television series that starred James Garner in the title role, a professional poker player in the Old West. The series aired on NBC from December 1, 1981, to May 4, 1982. It is a sequel series to the 1957-1962 ABC series Maverick, as well as the short-lived 1979 TV series Young Maverick, and that series' pilot, the 1978 TV movie The New Maverick, all of which starred Garner in the same role (though he appeared only briefly in Young Maverick). In the two previous series, Bret Maverick had been a solitary rounder who travels from riverboat to saloon looking for high-stakes games. In this series, Maverick has settled down in Sweetwater, Arizona Territory, where he owns a ranch (The Lazy Ace) and is co-owner of the town's saloon (The Red Ox). However, he is still always on the lookout for his next big score, and continues to gamble and practice various con games whenever the chance arises. The series was developed by Gordon Dawson, and produced by Garner's company "Comanche Productions" (a successor to his previous company, Cherokee Productions) in association with Warner Bros. Television.

== Series overview ==
Almost two decades after the original Maverick series, and a few years after his appearance in the 1978 TV movie The New Maverick, Bret Maverick has put down roots in the frontier community of Sweetwater, Arizona Territory where he is now the silent partner of the Red Ox saloon that he won in a card game. Maverick's still a gambler, and is not above running various con games to help make the money he needs to keep his businesses afloat. Because of this, he is viewed with suspicion by many of the town's more prominent citizens, especially the town's newly appointed sheriff.

Bret's business partner is Tom Guthrie (Ed Bruce), the town's former sheriff and co-owner of the Red Ox Saloon. Bruce, a noted country singer, also co-wrote and performed the show's theme song. Bret's penchant for organizing cons and money-making schemes of questionable legality means that he and ex-sheriff Guthrie are often at odds with each other, although they still remain friends. Also seen as series regulars are Richard Hamilton as Cy Whitaker, the aging but feisty foreman of Maverick's ranch; Ramon Bieri as prosperous local banker Elijah Crow; Darleen Carr as Mary Lou "M.L." Springer, the fetching owner, editor, and photographer of the local newspaper (and whose clothing and hairstyle are both very 1980s rather than 1880s); David Knell as Rodney Catlow, M.L.'s young assistant; and John Shearin as Mitchel Dowd, the town's arrogant and ineffectual sheriff who really does spell his first name with only one L.

Also seen frequently are three actors who were carryovers from Garner's previous series The Rockford Files:

- Stuart Margolin, who played Angel on The Rockford Files and appeared with Garner in the 1971–1972 series Nichols, appears in a recurring role as crooked Native American guide-for-hire Philo Sandeen (whose self-proclaimed native heritage is every bit as dubious as the rest of his consistently unverifiable claims).
- Jack Garner, James's brother and a frequent Rockford Files bit player, plays the role of Jack, the Red Ox's bespectacled bartender.
- Luis Delgado, Garner's longtime stand-in, and Officer Billings on Rockford, plays Red Ox employee Shifty Delgrado.

Semi-regulars included Tommy Bush as the inept but friendly Deputy Sturgess, and Marj Dusay as Kate Hanrahan, the town's madam.

== U.S. television ratings ==
Season	Episodes	Start date	End date	Nielsen rank	Nielsen rating
1981–82	18	December 1, 1981	May 4, 1982	34	N/A

== Cancellation and aftermath ==
Despite respectable ratings, the show was canceled by NBC at the end of the first season, airing only eighteen episodes. Writer/producer Roy Huggins, original creator of the title character but otherwise unconnected with this series despite Garner's request that he come aboard mid-season, speculated that one reason the new show didn't quite work was that Maverick, traditionally a drifter, had settled down in one place. Huggins and others also noted that this iteration of Bret Maverick was also more of an 'operator' than the 1950s version. While the earlier version of Maverick was certainly a gambler, his code of ethics was unshakable—he never targeted an innocent person with a con, only those who had fraudulently conned Maverick or others. As a consequence, the original Bret Maverick played cards and other games absolutely fair and above-board ... unless and until his opponent had unquestionably proven themselves to be a cheater. When that happened, Maverick would scheme to get his money back through his own methods of rule-bending and deceit. In the Bret Maverick series, however, Bret is somewhat more of a conman and hustler, and one who doesn't only target crooked gamblers. Also, several costumes and hairstyles, particularly of series regular Darleen Carr, reflected the style of the 1980s and not the old west in which the show was set.

Jack Kelly, who had alternated the lead with Garner and later Roger Moore in the original 1957–62 Maverick series, had been slated to return as Bret's brother Bart Maverick in the second season, and briefly appeared at the very end of the only season. A number of scripts for the following season had been written and presented to Kelly, according to subsequent interviews; Bart was going to look after the saloon in Arizona while Bret ranged across the West, thereby making this series closer in conception and tone to the original Maverick. The series' final episode also included a number of other changes to the series set-up: notably, Tom Guthrie was re-elected as sheriff, and sold his interest in the Red Ox to Kate Hanrahan, who immediately reinvented the establishment as an upscale brothel. As well, Mitchell Dowd was appointed to a government position as an inspector of bars and hotels throughout the Arizona territory, where he promised to remain a thorn in Maverick's side.

The 2-hour first episode was eventually trimmed and repackaged as a TV movie for rerunning on local stations under the title Bret Maverick: The Lazy Ace. Additionally the series' only two-part episode was similarly repackaged as Bret Maverick: Faith, Hope and Clarity. NBC took the unusual step of rerunning the episodes two additional times - in the summer of 1988 to help provide 'new' programming during a writers strike, and in the summer of 1994 to play off publicity surrounding the Mel Gibson movie remake of the original Maverick series also featuring Garner.

As a tribute to the character featured on this television series and on Maverick, on April 21, 2006, a ten-foot bronze statue of James Garner as Bret Maverick was unveiled in Garner's hometown of Norman, Oklahoma, with Garner present at the ceremony.

== Regular cast ==
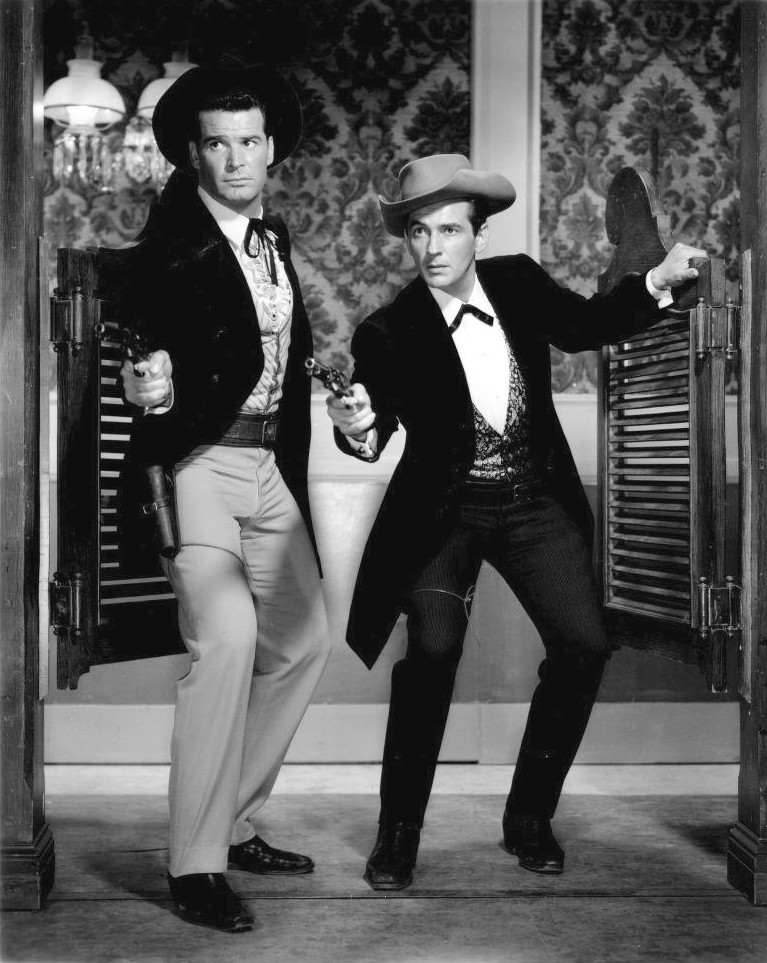
James Garner as Bret Maverick and Jack Kelly as Bart Maverick in the series Maverick

- James Garner as Bret Maverick
- Ed Bruce as Tom Guthrie
- Ramon Bieri as Elijah Crow
- John Shearin as Mitchel Dowd
- David Knell as Rodney Catlow
- Richard Hamilton as Cy Whittaker
- Stuart Margolin as Philo Sandeen
- Darleen Carr as Mary Lou Springer
- Jack Garner as Jack the bartender
- Tommy Bush as Deputy Sturgess

== Episode list ==
No. in season	Title	Directed by	Written by	Original release date
1	"The Lazy Ace"	Stuart Margolin	Gordon T. Dawson	December 1, 1981
2	"The Lazy Ace"	Stuart Margolin	Gordon T. Dawson	December 1, 1981
3	"Welcome to Sweetwater"	Rod Holcomb	Gordon T. Dawson	December 8, 1981
4	"Anything for a Friend"	Ivan Dixon	Lee David Zlotoff	December 15, 1981
5	"The Yellow Rose"	William Wiard	Lee David Zlotoff	December 22, 1981
6	"Horse of Yet Another Color"	Ivan Dixon	S : Geoffrey Fischer; S/T : Lee David Zlotoff	January 5, 1982
7	"Dateline: Sweetwater"	William Wiard	Ira Steven Behr	January 12, 1982
8	"The Mayflower Women's Historical Society"	Ivan Dixon	Lee David Zlotoff	February 2, 1982
9	"Hallie"	John Patterson	Marion Hargrove	February 9, 1982
10	"The Ballad of Bret Maverick"	Jeff Bleckner	Gordon T. Dawson	February 16, 1982
11	"A Night at the Red Ox"	William Wiard	Lee David Zlotoff	February 23, 1982
12	"The Not So Magnificent Six"	Leo Penn	S : Shel Willens; T : Geoffrey Fischer	March 2, 1982
13	"The Vulture Also Rises"	Michael O'Herlihy	T : Gordon T. Dawson; S/T : Rogers Turrentine	March 16, 1982
14	"The Eight Swords of Dyrus and Other Illusions of Grandeur"	John Patterson	S : Larry Mollin; S/T : Gordon T. Dawson	March 23, 1982
15	"Faith, Hope and Clarity: Part 1"	Leo Penn	S : Paul L. Ehrmann; S/T : Lee David Zlotoff	April 13, 1982
16	"Faith, Hope and Clarity: Part 2"	Leo Penn	S : Paul L. Ehrmann; S/T : Lee David Zlotoff	April 20, 1982
17	"The Rattlesnake Brigade"	Fernando Lamas	T : Barton Dean; S/T : Geoffrey Fischer	April 27, 1982
18	"The Hidalgo Thing"	Thomas Carter	Gordon T. Dawson	May 4, 1982

== Home media ==
On April 22, 2014, Warner Bros. released the complete series on DVD, under the Warner Archive label.

== Syndication ==
The series has rerun on Encore Westerns since fall 2008. On December 30, 2018, American TV network getTV started rerunning the series.

Currently, it airs on Outlaw.
