= James Garner =

American actor (1928–2014)

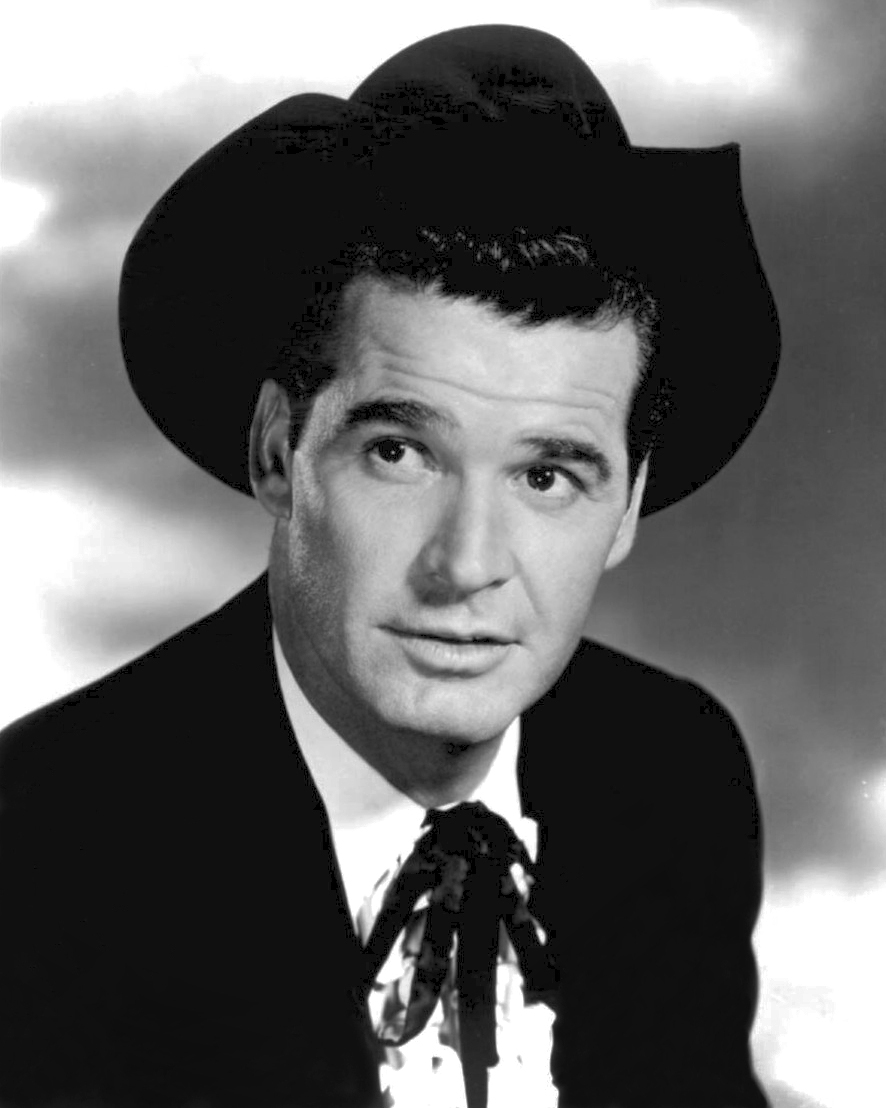
- Garner as Maverick (1959)
- Born: James Scott Bumgarner; April 7, 1928; Denver, Oklahoma, U.S. (now Norman, Oklahoma, U.S.)
- Died: July 19, 2014 (aged 86); Los Angeles, California, U.S.
- Occupations: Actor, producer
- Years active: 1954–2014
- Political party: Democratic
- Spouse: Lois Josephine Fleischman Clarke (m. 1956)
- Children: 2 (Note: One biological child and one stepchild.)
- Relatives: Jack Garner (brother)
- Military career
- Allegiance: United States
- Branch: United States Army National Guard; United States Merchant Marine
- Service years: 1944–1946 (Merchant Marine); 1950–1952 (Army)
- Rank: Corporal
- Units: California Army National Guard; 5th Regimental Combat Team; 24th Infantry Division
- Conflicts: World War II; Korean War
- Awards: Combat Infantryman Badge; Purple Heart (2); National Defense Service Medal; Korean War Service Medal; Merchant Marine Combat Medal; Merchant Marine Atlantic War Zone Medal; Merchant Marine World War II Victory Medal; United Nations Service Medal for Korea; United States Army Presidential Unit Citation; Republic of Korea Presidential Unit Citation

James Scott Garner (né Bumgarner; April 7, 1928 – July 19, 2014) was an American actor and producer of film and television. He was an Academy Award nominee, and won three Golden Globe Awards (out of 12 total nominations) and two Primetime Emmy Awards (out of 15 total nominations).

Garner achieved television stardom as the titular gambler Bret Maverick on the television Western Maverick (1957–62), which he later reprised in the sequel series Bret Maverick (1981–82). In the 1970s, he starred as private investigator Jim Rockford on the series The Rockford Files (1974–80).

He also played leading roles in more than 50 theatrical films, including The Great Escape (1963), The Americanization of Emily (1964), Grand Prix (1966), Support Your Local Sheriff! (1969), Victor/Victoria (1982), and Murphy's Romance (1985), for which he received an Oscar nomination for Best Actor.

== Early life ==
Garner was born James Scott Bumgarner on April 7, 1928, in Norman, Oklahoma, the youngest child of Weldon Warren Bumgarner (1901–1986) and Mildred Scott (née Meek; 1907–1933). His father was of part German ancestry, and Garner claimed that his mother, who died when he was five years old, was half Cherokee, although his maternal grandparents were listed as white on the census. His older brothers were Jack Garner (1926–2011), also an actor, and Charles Warren Bumgarner (1924–1984), a school administrator. His family was Methodist. The family ran a general store at Denver Corner on the east side of Norman. After their mother's death, Garner and his brothers were sent to live with relatives.

Garner attended Wilson Elementary School, Norman Junior High School and Norman High School (Norman Public Schools).

Garner was reunited with his family in 1934 when his father remarried, the first of several times. He had a volatile relationship with one of his stepmothers, Wilma, who beat all three boys. He said that his stepmother also punished him by forcing him to wear a dress in public. When he was 14 years old, he fought with her, knocking her down and choking her to keep her from retaliating against him physically. She left the family and never returned. His brother Jack later commented, "She was a damn no-good woman". Garner's last stepmother was Grace, whom he said he loved and called "Mama Grace", and he felt that she was more of a mother to him than anyone else had been.

Shortly after Garner's father's marriage to Wilma broke up, his father moved to Los Angeles, leaving Garner and his brothers in Norman. After working at several jobs he disliked, Garner joined the U.S. Merchant Marine at age 16 near the end of World War II. He liked the work and his shipmates, but he had chronic seasickness and only lasted a year.

Garner followed his father to Los Angeles in 1945, attending Hollywood High while helping his dad lay carpet. The next five years were back and forth between California and Oklahoma, during which Garner worked in chick hatcheries and the oil fields, as a truck driver and grocery clerk, and even as a swim trunks model for Jantzen...

After World War II, Garner joined his father in Los Angeles and was enrolled at Hollywood High School, where he was voted the most popular student. A high school gym teacher recommended him for a job modeling Jantzen bathing suits. It paid well ($25 an hour) but, in his first interview for the Archives of American Television, he said he hated modeling. He soon quit and returned to Norman.

There he played football and basketball at Norman High School and competed on the track and golf teams. However, he dropped out in his senior year. In a 1976 Good Housekeeping magazine interview, he admitted, "I was a terrible student and I never actually graduated from high school, but I got my diploma in the Army."

=== Military service ===
Garner enlisted in the California Army National Guard, serving his first 7 months in California. He was deployed to Korea during the Korean War, and spent 14 months as a rifleman in the 5th Infantry Regiment, the core component of the 5th Regimental Combat Team, then part of the 24th Infantry Division. He was wounded twice: in the face and hand by fragmentation from a mortar round, and in the buttocks by friendly fire from U.S. fighter jets as he dove into a foxhole. Garner would later joke that "there was a lot of room involving my rear end. How could they miss?"

Garner received the Purple Heart in Korea for his initial wounding. He also qualified for a second Purple Heart (for which he was eligible, since he was hit by friendly fire which "was released with the full intent of inflicting damage or destroying enemy troops or equipment"), but did not actually receive it until 1983, 32 years after the event. This was apparently the result of an error which was not rectified until Garner appeared on Good Morning America in November 1982, with presenter David Hartman making inquiries "after he learned of the case on his television show". At the ceremony where he received his second Purple Heart, Garner understated: "After 32 years, it's better to receive this now than posthumously". Reflecting on his military service, Garner recalled: "Do I have fond memories? I guess if you get together with some buddies it's fond. But it really wasn't. It was cold and hard. I was one of the lucky ones."

==== Awards ====

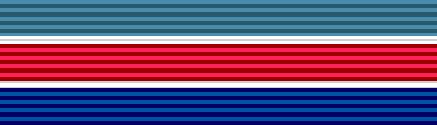

Combat Infantry Badge
Purple Heart
National Defense; Service Medal	Korean War; Service Medal	Merchant Marine; Combat Medal
Merchant Marine; Atlantic War Zone Medal	Merchant Marine; World War II Victory Medal	United Nations; Service Medal for Korea
United States Army; Presidential Unit Citation		Republic of Korea; Presidential Unit Citation

== Career ==
=== Earliest acting roles (1954–1957) ===
In 1954, Paul Gregory, a theatre and future film producer whom Garner met while attending Hollywood High School, persuaded Garner to take a nonspeaking role in the Broadway production of The Caine Mutiny Court-Martial, where he was able to study Henry Fonda night after night. After Garner's death in 2014, TCM host Robert Osborne said that Fonda's gentle, sincere persona rubbed off on Garner.

Garner subsequently moved to television commercials and eventually to television roles. In 1955, Garner was considered for the lead role in Cheyenne, which went to Clint Walker; Garner wound up playing an Army officer in the series pilot titled "Mountain Fortress".

In 1957, he had a supporting role in the TV anthology series episode on Conflict entitled "Man from 1997." The series' producer Roy Huggins noted in his Archive of American Television interview that he subsequently cast Garner as the lead in Maverick due to his comedic facial expressions while playing scenes in "Man from 1997" that Huggins had not written to be comical. Garner changed his last name from Bumgarner to Garner after the studio credited him as "James Garner" without permission. He then changed it legally upon the birth of his child, when he decided she had too many names.

=== Maverick (1957–1960) ===
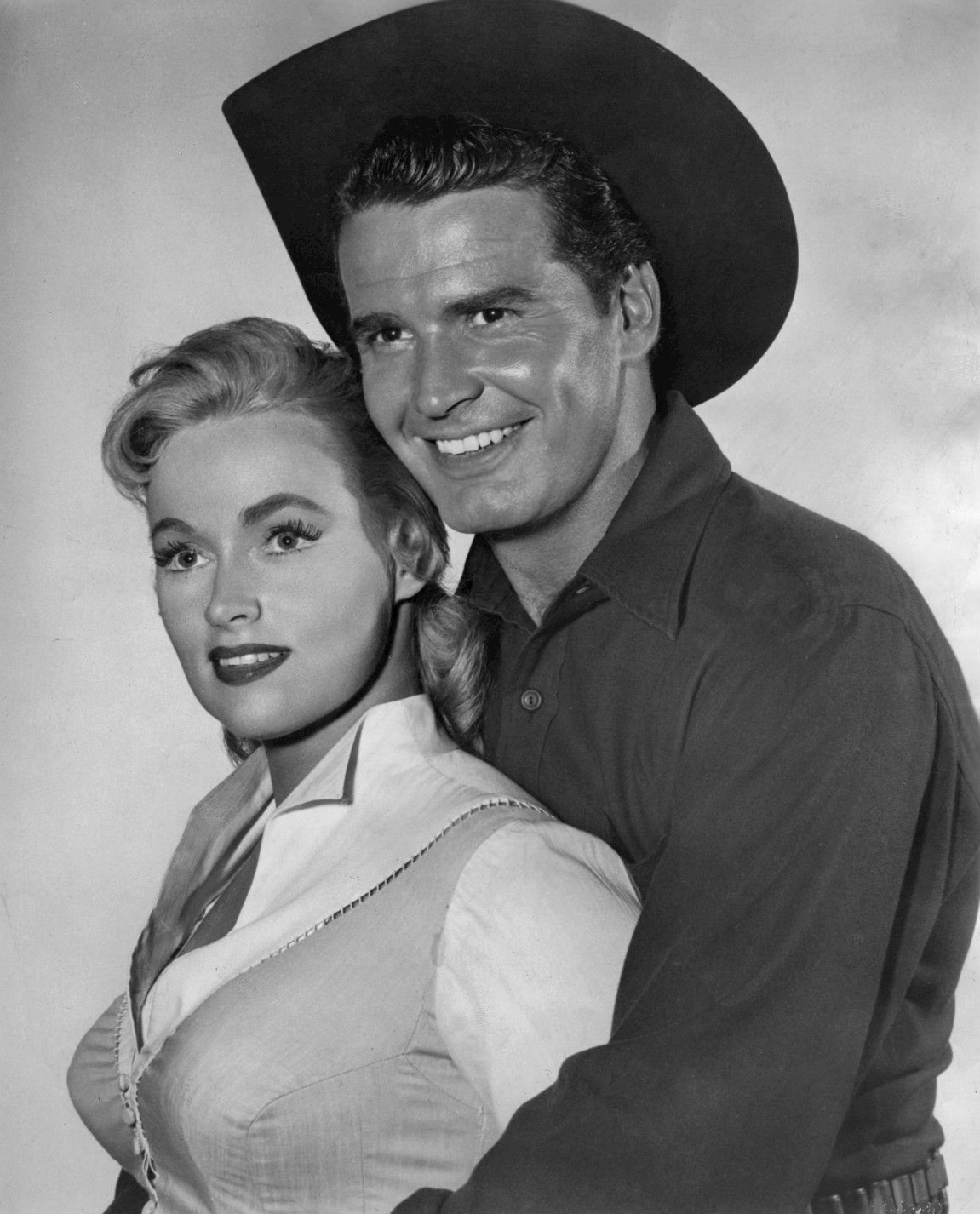
With Karen Steele in Maverick

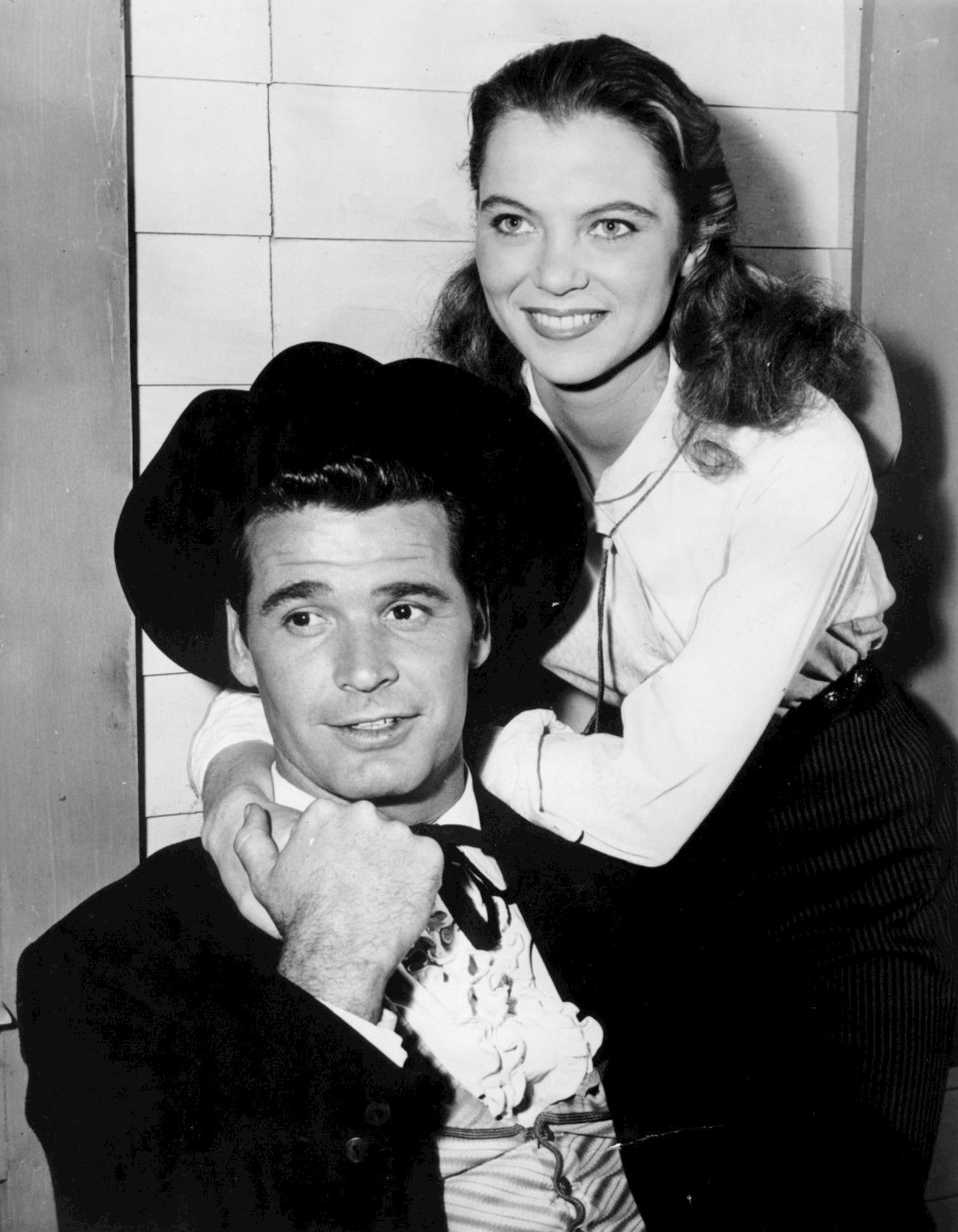
With Louise Fletcher in Maverick

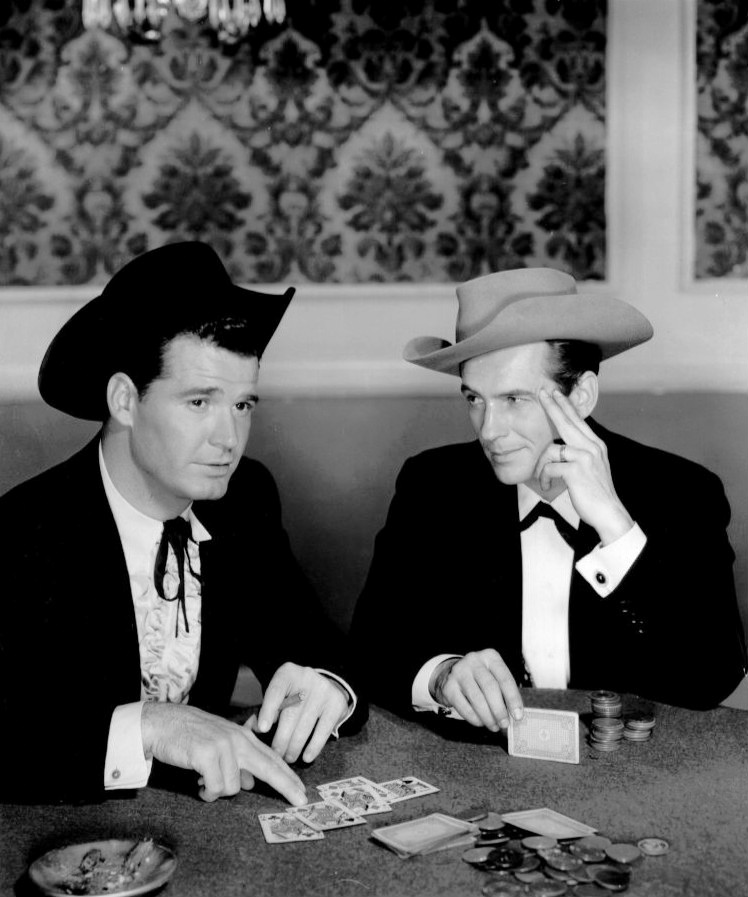
With Jack Kelly in Maverick

After several feature film roles, including Sayonara (1957) with Marlon Brando, Garner got his big break playing the role of professional gambler Bret Maverick in the Western series Maverick from 1957 to 1960. In 1959, he was nominated for the Primetime Emmy Award for Outstanding Lead Actor in a Drama Series for his performance.

Only Garner and Roy Huggins thought Maverick could compete with The Ed Sullivan Show and The Steve Allen Show in the Nielsen ratings, but for two years Maverick beat them both. The show made Garner a household name.

Garner was the lone star of Maverick for the first seven episodes but production demands forced Warner Bros. to create a brother, played by Jack Kelly. This allowed two production units to film different story lines and episodes simultaneously, necessary because each episode took an extra day to complete, meaning that eventually the studio would run out of finished episodes partway through the season unless another actor was added.

Critics were positive about the chemistry with Kelly and Garner. The series occasionally featured popular cross-over episodes starring both Maverick brothers as well as brief appearances by Kelly in Garner episodes. This included "Shady Deal at Sunny Acres," upon which the first half of The Sting appears to be based, according to Roy Huggins' Archive of American Television interview. Garner quit after the third season due to a dispute with Warner Bros. but was in a fourth-season Maverick that had been held back to run as that season's first episode if Garner lost his lawsuit. Garner won, left the series, and the episode ran in midseason.

The studio attempted to replace Garner's character with a Maverick cousin who had lived in Britain long enough to gain an English accent, featuring Roger Moore as Beau Maverick, but Moore left after filming only fourteen episodes. Warner Bros. also hired Robert Colbert as a third Maverick brother for two episodes at the end of the season. That left the rest of the run to Kelly, alternating with reruns of episodes with Garner for the fifth season. Garner still received billing in the new Kelly episodes, aired in 1961–1962, although the studio did reverse the billing at the beginning of each show and in advertisements, putting Kelly above Garner.

Garner played the lead role in Darby's Rangers (1958). Originally slated for a supporting role, he got the lead when Charlton Heston turned it down. Following this success, Warner Bros. gave Garner two more films, made during breaks in his Maverick shooting schedule: Up Periscope (1959) and Cash McCall (1960) opposite Natalie Wood.

=== 1960s ===
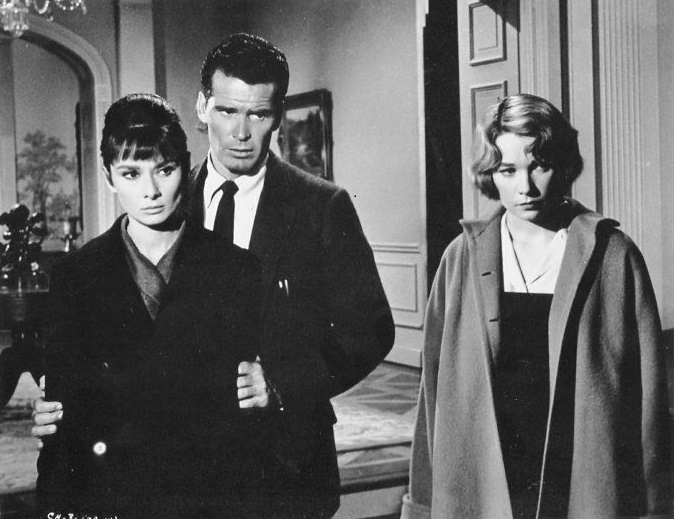
With Audrey Hepburn and Shirley MacLaine in The Children's Hour

After his acrimonious departure from Warner Bros., Garner was briefly graylisted until William Wyler hired him for a starring role in The Children's Hour (1961) with Audrey Hepburn and Shirley MacLaine, a drama about two teachers surviving scandal started by a student. After that, Garner abruptly became one of the busiest leading men in cinema. In Boys' Night Out (1962) with Kim Novak and The Thrill of It All (1963) with Doris Day, he returned to comedy. Garner also starred opposite Day in Move Over, Darling, a 1963 remake of 1940's My Favorite Wife in which Garner portrayed the role originally played by Cary Grant. (The remake was recast and retitled when Dean Martin withdrew after the death of Marilyn Monroe.)

Next came the World War II dramas The Great Escape (1963), The Americanization of Emily (1964) with Julie Andrews, and Roald Dahl's 36 Hours (1965) with Eva Marie Saint. In the smash hit The Great Escape, Garner played the second lead for the only time during the decade, supporting Steve McQueen among a cast of British and American screen veterans including Richard Attenborough, Donald Pleasence, David McCallum, James Coburn, and Charles Bronson in a depiction of a mass escape from a German prisoner of war camp based on a true story. The film was released the same month as The Thrill of It All, giving Garner two hits at the same time.

The Americanization of Emily, a literate antiwar D-Day comedy, featured a screenplay written by Paddy Chayefsky and remained Garner's favorite of all his work. In 1963, exhibitors voted him the 16th most popular star in the US and it was thought he might be a successor to Clark Gable. In Mister Buddwing (1966), he starred as a man who finds himself sitting on a bench in Central Park without knowing how he got there.

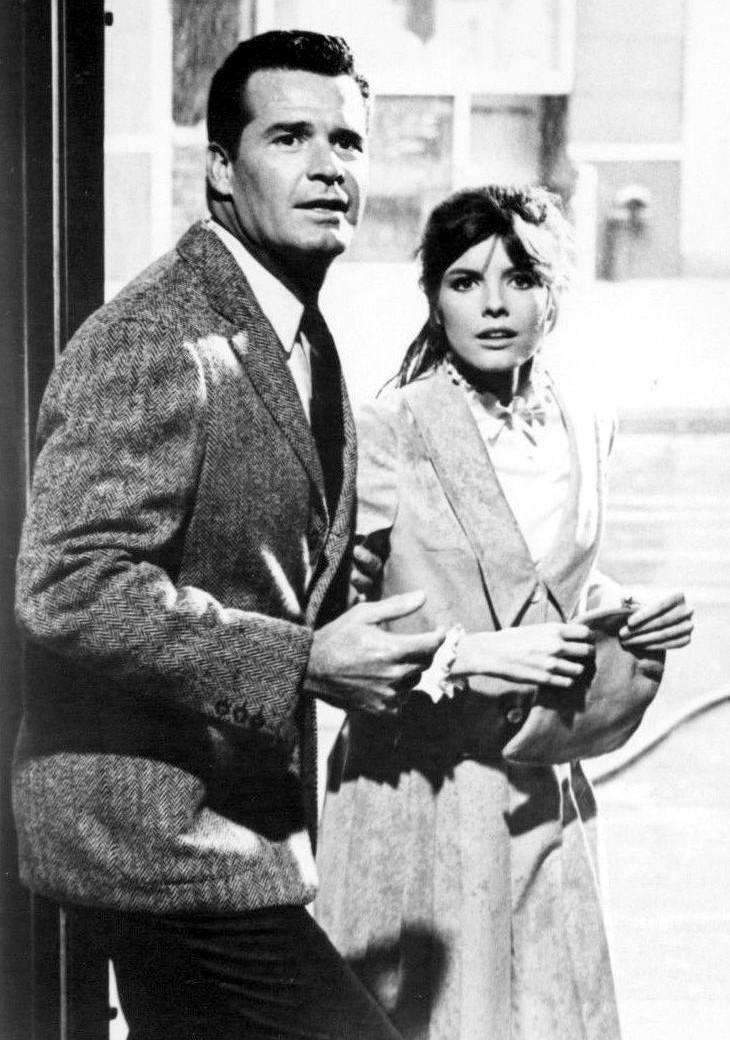
With Katharine Ross in Mister Buddwing (1966)

In 1964, Garner formed his own company, Cherokee Productions. After several lackluster entries, Grand Prix (1966), directed by John Frankenheimer and co-produced by Cherokee, co-starred him with Yves Montand and Eva Marie Saint on the European Grand Prix circuit. The expensive Cinerama epic by MGM did not fare as well as expected, and in light of his recent films, Garner was blamed for the disappointing box office on Grand Prix, which damaged his film career.

However, driving Formula 3 cars for the filming gave Garner the urge to race for real, distracting him from his career in front of the camera. He formed his own American International Racing team and both competed in and backed as team owner racing in numerous classes, captured in a documentary he co-produced and starred in, The Racing Scene, in 1969.

Despite opposition from MGM and having to plead his case, Garner played Raymond Chandler's Philip Marlowe in Marlowe, a 1969 neo-noir featuring an extended kung fu scene with Bruce Lee. Garner rounded out the 1960s with the hit comedy, Support Your Local Sheriff!.

=== 1970s ===
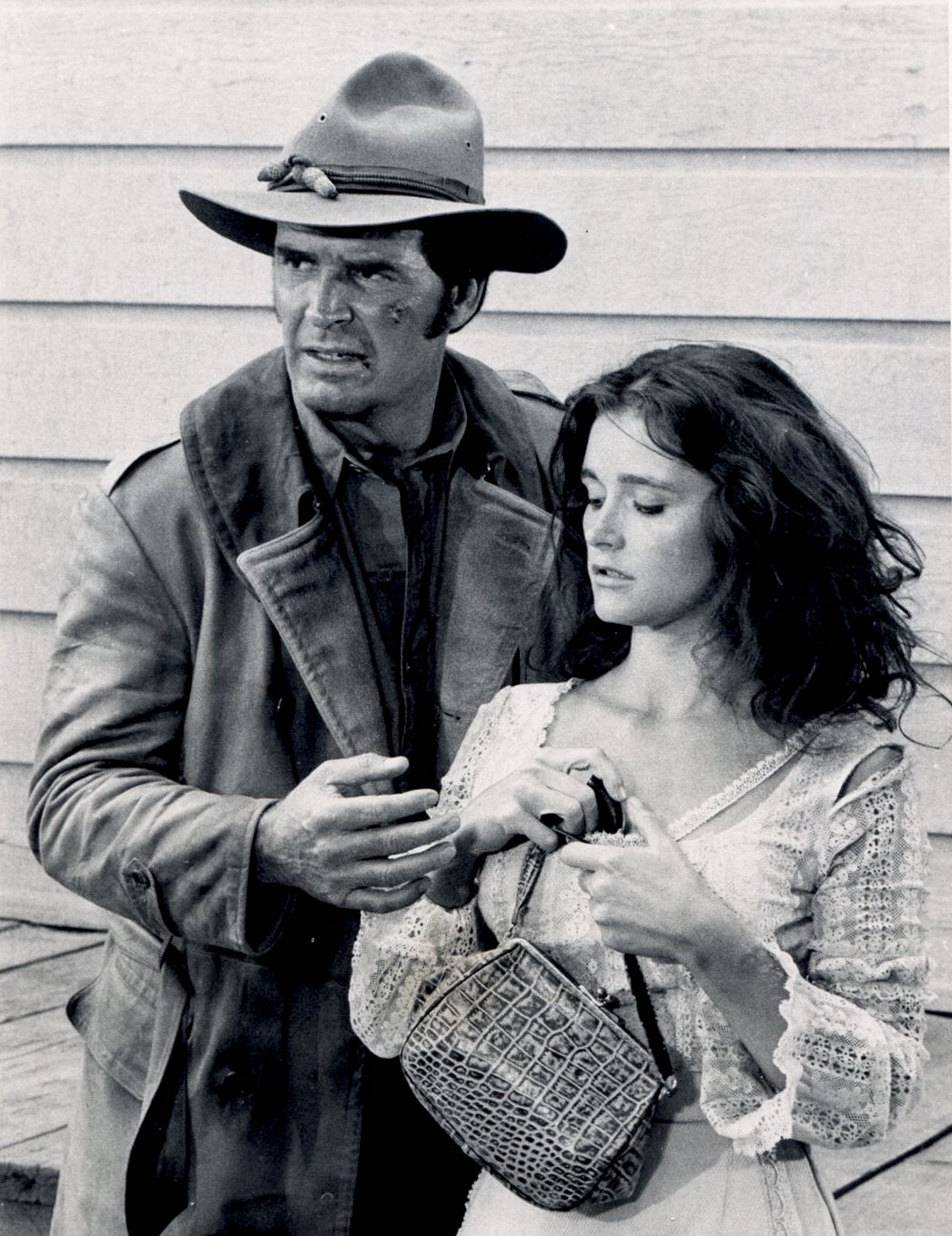
With Margot Kidder in Nichols

Along with his undistinguished early 1970s films, including Support Your Local Gunfighter, Garner returned to television for the offbeat Nichols which lasted one season.

==== The Rockford Files (1974–1980) ====
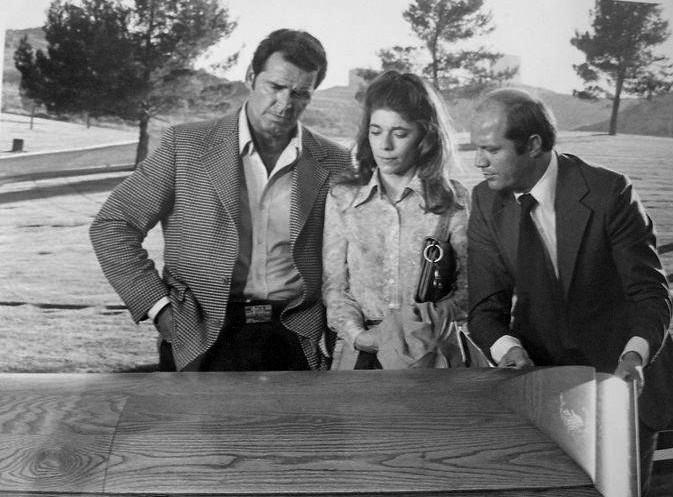
Garner in the 1974 episode "Tall Woman in Red Wagon" featuring Sian Barbara Allen with David Morick as the county coroner

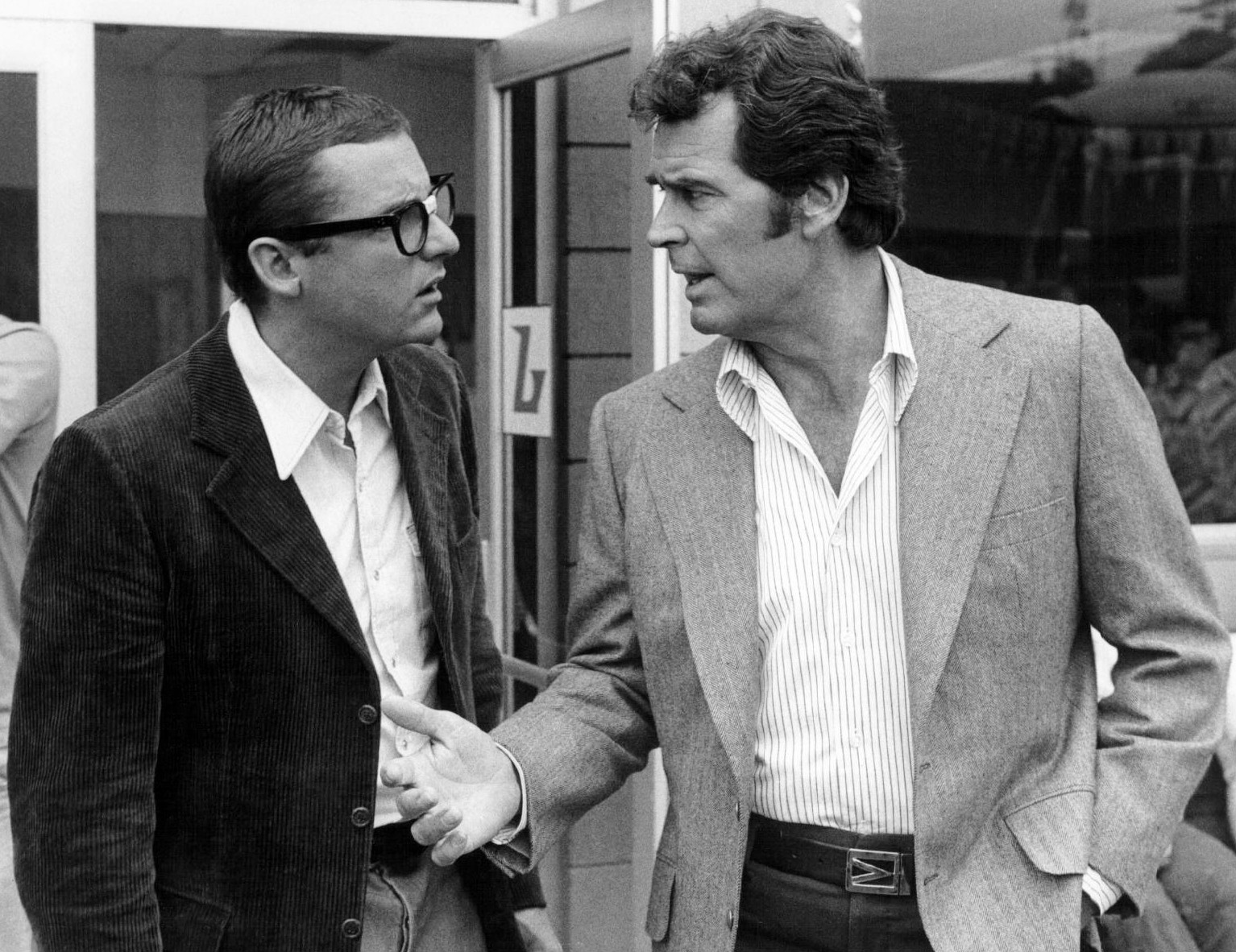
With James Whitmore Jr. in The Rockford Files (1977)

With Garner's career in a lull, Roy Huggins had an idea to reprise Maverick, but with Garner as a modern-day private detective. Starting in 1974, Cherokee produced six seasons of The Rockford Files, starring Garner as Jim Rockford. According to Huggins' and co-creator Stephen J. Cannell's Archive of American Television interviews, many of the plots were recycled from Maverick, but Rockford was, in the words of film and television critic Matt Zoller Seitz in TV (The Book), "the role (Garner) was put on earth to play". It earned him the 1977 Emmy Award for Best Actor.

From 1978 to 1985, Garner co-starred with Mariette Hartley, who had made an Emmy-nominated appearance on The Rockford Files in 1979, in 250 TV commercials for Polaroid, a manufacturer of instant film and cameras. They portrayed a bantering, bickering couple so convincingly that some viewers believed that the two were married. After six seasons, The Rockford Files was cancelled in 1980. Appearing in nearly every scene and doing many of his own stunts, including one that injured his back, was wearing him out. A knee injury from his National Guard days worsened, and he was hospitalized with a bleeding ulcer. When Garner's physician ordered him to rest, NBC immediately cancelled The Rockford Files.

Garner's co-star Stuart Margolin said that despite Garner's health problems in the later years of The Rockford Files, he often worked long shifts, unusual for a starring actor, staying to do off-camera lines with other actors, and doing his own stunts despite his knee problems. When Garner later made The Rockford Files television movies, he said that 22 people, with the exception of co-star Noah Beery Jr., who died late in 1994, came out of retirement to participate.

In July 1983, Garner filed suit against Universal Studios for US$16.5 million in connection with The Rockford Files, charging Universal with "breach of contract; failure to deal in good faith and fairly; and fraud and deceit". Garner alleged "creative accounting", two words that are now part of the Hollywood lexicon. The suit was eventually settled out of court in 1989. As part of the agreement, Garner could not disclose the amount of the settlement.

"The industry is like it always has been. It's a bunch of greedy people," he stated in 1990. Garner sued Universal again in 1998 for $2.2 million over syndication royalties. In this suit, he charged the studio with "deceiving him and suppressing information about syndication". He was supposed to receive $25,000 per episode that ran in syndication, but Universal charged him "distribution fees". He also felt that the studio did not release the show to the highest bidder for reruns.

==== The New Maverick (1978) ====
Garner and Jack Kelly reappeared as Bret and Bart Maverick in a 1978 made-for-television film titled The New Maverick written by Juanita Bartlett, directed by Hy Averback, and co-starring Susan Sullivan as Poker Alice. As was often the case in the original series, Bart shows up only briefly toward the end. The New Maverick was a pilot for a failed series, Young Maverick, featuring their younger cousin Ben Maverick, portrayed by Charles Frank. Young Maverick, which presented Garner for only a few moments at the beginning of the first show, was canceled so rapidly that some of the episodes were never broadcast in the United States. Despite the title, Frank was three years older than Garner at the launch of the original series.

=== 1980s ===
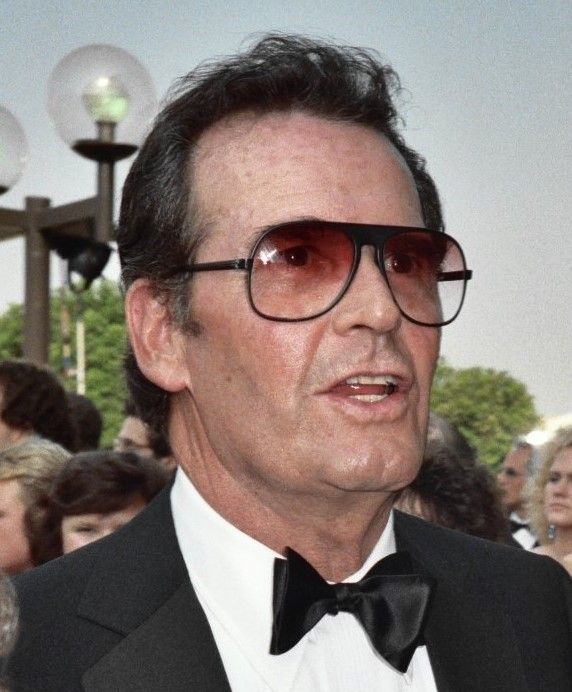
Garner in 1987

==== TV movies ====
After a season of Bret Maverick in 1981–82, Garner played dramatic roles in television films, including Heartsounds featuring the true story of a doctor (Garner) deprived of oxygen for too long during an operation who woke up mentally impaired, Promise, which dealt with a mentally ill adult sibling, and My Name Is Bill W. in which Garner portrayed the founder of Alcoholics Anonymous. In 1984, he led Joseph Wambaugh's The Glitter Dome for HBO Pictures, directed by Stuart Margolin. The film generated some controversy for a bondage sequence featuring Garner and Margot Kidder.

==== Murphy's Romance (1985) ====
Garner also resumed his movie career, enjoying success at the box office with Victor/Victoria with Julie Andrews for Blake Edwards in 1982, and in 1984 with Tank. His only Oscar nomination was for Best Actor in a Leading Role for Murphy's Romance (1985), opposite Sally Field. Field and Martin Ritt had to fight Columbia Pictures to have Garner cast, since he was by then regarded as a TV actor who occasionally made films. But after the success of Field's Norma Rae (1979), with the same director and screenplay writing team (Harriet Frank Jr. and Irving Ravetch), and with Field's production company (Fogwood Films) producing, Columbia agreed, despite being lukewarm about the film itself. The studio wanted Marlon Brando as Murphy, but Field and Ritt insisted on Garner. Part of the deal with the studio, which at that time was owned by The Coca-Cola Company, included both Field and Garner mentioning "Coke," and Coca-Cola signs had to appear prominently in the film. In A&E's Biography of Garner, Field said that her on-screen kiss with Garner was the best cinematic kiss she ever experienced.

==== Sunset (1988) ====
Garner played Wyatt Earp in two different movies shot 21 years apart, first in John Sturges's Hour of the Gun in 1967, and then in Blake Edwards' Sunset in 1988. While the first film was a realistic depiction of the O.K. Corral shootout and its aftermath, the second was a comedy centered on a fictional adventure shared by Earp with silent movie cowboy star Tom Mix, inspired by Earp's real career as a consultant on Western movies in his later years. The movie features Bruce Willis as Mix, billed above Garner, though the film gave more screen time and emphasis to Earp.

For the second half of the 1980s, continuing his career as a pitchman, Garner also appeared in Mazda television commercials as an on-screen spokesman.

=== 1990s ===
In 1991, Garner starred in Man of the People, an NBC series about a con man filling an empty seat on a city council which was cancelled after only ten of its episodes were aired.

In 1993, Garner starred in a well-regarded HBO movie, Barbarians at the Gate, then reprised his role as Jim Rockford in eight Rockford Files TV movies for CBS beginning the following year. According to Garner's memoir, he insisted upon being fully paid in cash before shooting each of the Rockford movies.

In 1994, Garner co-starred as Marshal Zane Cooper in the movie version of Maverick, with Mel Gibson and Jodie Foster in the leading roles. He starred in the TV miniseries Streets of Laredo, and paired with Jack Lemmon in My Fellow Americans on the big screen. In addition to a recurring role in Chicago Hope, Garner also starred in two short-lived TV series, the animated God, the Devil and Bob and First Monday.

=== 2000s and 2010s ===
In 2000, after having both knees replaced, Garner appeared with Clint Eastwood as astronauts in Space Cowboys. In 2002, following the death of James Coburn, Garner took over the TV commercial voiceovers for Chevrolet's "Like a Rock" advertising campaign, on which Garner continued through the end of the campaign. Also in 2002, he was Sandra Bullock's father in Divine Secrets of the Ya-Ya Sisterhood, and after the death of John Ritter, Garner joined the cast of 8 Simple Rules in 2003, remaining with the series until it ended in 2005.

In 2004, Garner starred as the older version of Ryan Gosling's character in the film version of The Notebook, for which the Screen Actors Guild nominated Garner as best male actor. In 2006, Garner made his last appearance in The Ultimate Gift, although he voiced Shazam in Superman/Shazam!: The Return of Black Adam in 2010.

=== Memoir ===
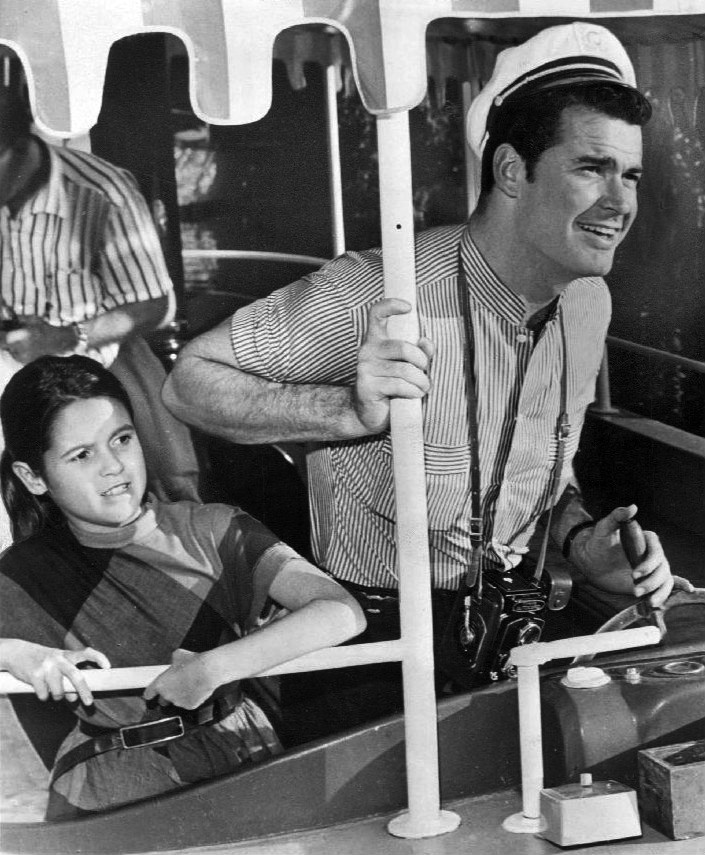
With stepdaughter Kim in 1958

On November 1, 2011, Simon & Schuster published Garner's autobiography The Garner Files: A Memoir, co-written with Jon Winokur. In addition to recounting his career, it detailed the childhood abuses Garner suffered at the hands of his stepmother. It also offered unflattering assessments of Steve McQueen, Charles Bronson, and Glen Larson, though he was effusive in praise for others. In addition to recalling the genesis of his hit films and television shows, the book featured a section in which the star critiqued each of his acting projects, accompanied by a star rating for each. (His favorite: The Americanization of Emily; least favorite: Mister Buddwing.) Garner's three-time co-star Julie Andrews wrote the foreword. Lauren Bacall, Diahann Carroll, Doris Day, Tom Selleck, Stephen J. Cannell, and other associates, friends, and relatives provided memories in the book's coda.

The "most explosive revelation" in his autobiography was that Garner smoked marijuana for most of his life. "I started smoking it in my late teens," Garner wrote.

I drank to get drunk but ultimately didn't like the effect. Not so with grass. It had the opposite effect from alcohol: it made me more tolerant and forgiving. I did a little bit of cocaine in the Eighties, courtesy of John Belushi, but fortunately I didn't like it. But I smoked marijuana for 50 years and I don't know where I'd be without it. It opened my mind and now it eases my arthritis. After decades of research I've concluded that marijuana should be legal and alcohol illegal.

== Other activities ==
=== Motorsports ===
In his youth, Garner raced with "hot cars" in "chases", but his interest in auto racing grew during preparations for the filming of Grand Prix. John Frankenheimer, the director and impetus behind the project, was determined to make the film as realistic as possible. He wanted to determine which actor he could focus on for high speed takes. At his disposal were the services of Bob Bondurant, a Formula 1 racer serving as technical consultant on the film. The first step was to place the actors in a two-seater version of a Formula 1 car to see how they would handle the high speeds. Bondurant noted that all the actors became quite frightened going over 240 kph, (149 mph) except Garner, who returned to the pit laughing like an excited child. Said Bondurant, "This is your man". From there, the actors were placed in a race driver training program except for Garner, whom Bondurant was assigned to train. Garner proved a good student, a hard worker, and a talented driver. Compared to the other actors in the movie, Bondurant tagged Garner as being 'light years' ahead. By the end of the film Bondurant asserted that Garner could compete on a Formula 1 team, and would best some of the drivers in the field.

From 1967 through 1969 Garner was an owner of the "American International Racers" (AIR) auto racing team. Motorsports writer William Edgar and Hollywood director Andy Sidaris teamed with Garner for the racing documentary The Racing Scene, filmed in 1969 and released in 1970. The team fielded cars at the Le Mans, Daytona, and Sebring endurance races, as well as early off-road motor-sports events, in many of which Garner competed. In 1978, he was one of the inaugural inductees in the Off-Road Motorsports Hall of Fame.

Garner signed a three-year sponsorship contract with American Motors Corporation (AMC). His shops prepared ten 1969 SC/Ramblers for the Baja 500 race. Garner did not drive in this event due to a film commitment in Spain. Nevertheless, seven of his cars finished, taking three of the top five places in the sedan class. Garner drove the pace car at the Indianapolis 500 in 1975, 1977, and 1985 (see: list of Indianapolis 500 pace cars).

In 1987, Garner announced plans to partner with Larry Cahill to form a racing team to compete in the 1988 Indycar season. The intention was to base the team in Cedar Rapids, Iowa with an estimated budget of $3.5 million, but the plans never came to fruition. Cahill later formed his own team to compete in the Indy Racing League.

=== Golf ===
Garner was an avid golfer for many years. Along with his brother, Jack, he played golf in high school. Jack even attempted a professional golf career after a brief stint in the Pittsburgh Pirates baseball farm system. Garner took it up again in the late 1950s to see if he could beat Jack. He was a regular for years at the Pebble Beach Pro-Am. In February 1990 at the AT&T Golf Tournament, he won the Most Valuable Amateur Trophy. Garner appeared on Sam Snead's Celebrity Golf TV series, which aired from 1960 – 1963. These matches were 9-hole charity events pitting Snead against Hollywood celebrities. He was a member of Bel Air Country Club.

== Personal life ==
=== Marriage and family ===
Despite his popularity and sociable nature, Garner was seen as a down-to-earth man who kept his family life private.

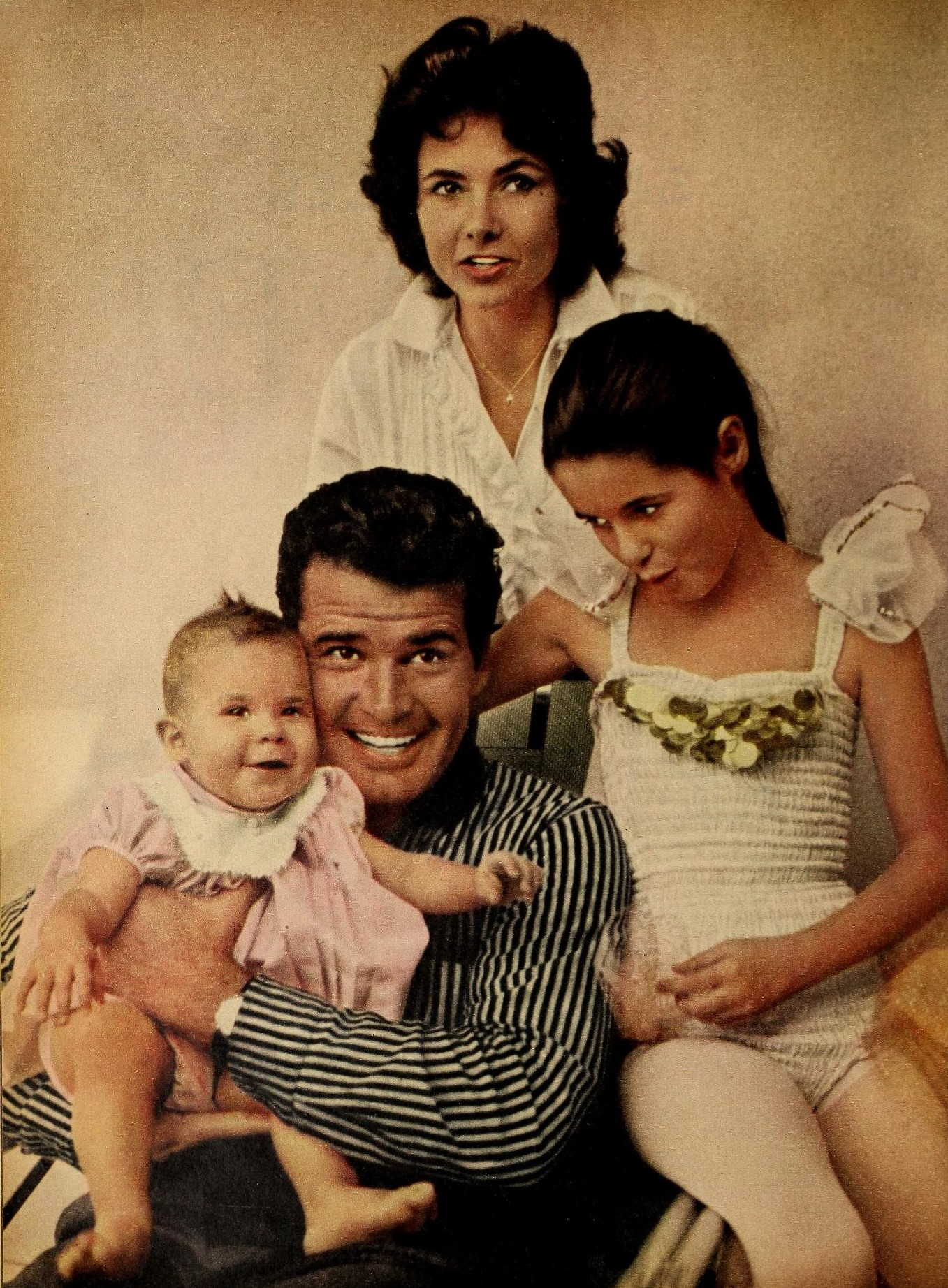
James Garner family, 1959

Garner married Lois Josephine Fleischman Clarke on August 17, 1956 after a two-week courtship. "We went to dinner every night for 14 nights. I was just absolutely nuts about her. I spent $77 on our honeymoon, and it about broke me." Clarke had a nine-year-old daughter from a previous marriage who was recovering from polio. Garner and Clarke had one daughter together, Greta, nicknamed "Gigi", born on January 4, 1958.

Their marriage endured two periods of separation: the first for three months in 1970, and the second in 1979. The couple reunited in 1981 and remained together until his death in 2014. Garner said, "Marriage is like the Army; everyone complains, but you'd be surprised at the large number of people who re-enlist."

Garner stated that during this second period apart he split his time between Canada and "a rented house in the Valley." In both cases Garner attributed the separations to the stress of his career and not to marital problems. In the case of The Rockford Files he was in almost every scene while in constant pain due to his arthritic knees, and under pressure from the studio. Garner stated that when the series ended, he needed to spend time alone in order to recover.

Garner's death in 2014 was less than a month before their 58th anniversary. His wife died in 2021, aged 98.

=== American football ===
Garner was noted as an enthusiastic fan of the Raiders in the NFL; he regularly attended games and mixed with the players. He was also present when the Raiders won Super Bowl XVIII over the Washington Redskins in January 1984 at Tampa, Florida. The former Raiders team physician Dr. Robert Huizenga noted with amusement in his book about being an NFL doctor that Garner and Lee Majors were fixtures at Raider home games in Los Angeles but made a point of never talking to or even acknowledging each other, for reasons that were never revealed to Huizenga or anyone else (including Al Davis).

=== University of Oklahoma ===
Garner was a supporter of the University of Oklahoma, often returning to Norman for school functions. When he attended Oklahoma Sooners football games, he frequently watched from the sidelines or from the press box. Garner received an honorary Doctor of Humane Letters degree at OU in 1995.

In 2003, to endow the James Garner Chair in the School of Drama, he donated $500,000 towards a total $1 million endowment for the first endowed position at the drama school.

=== Politics ===
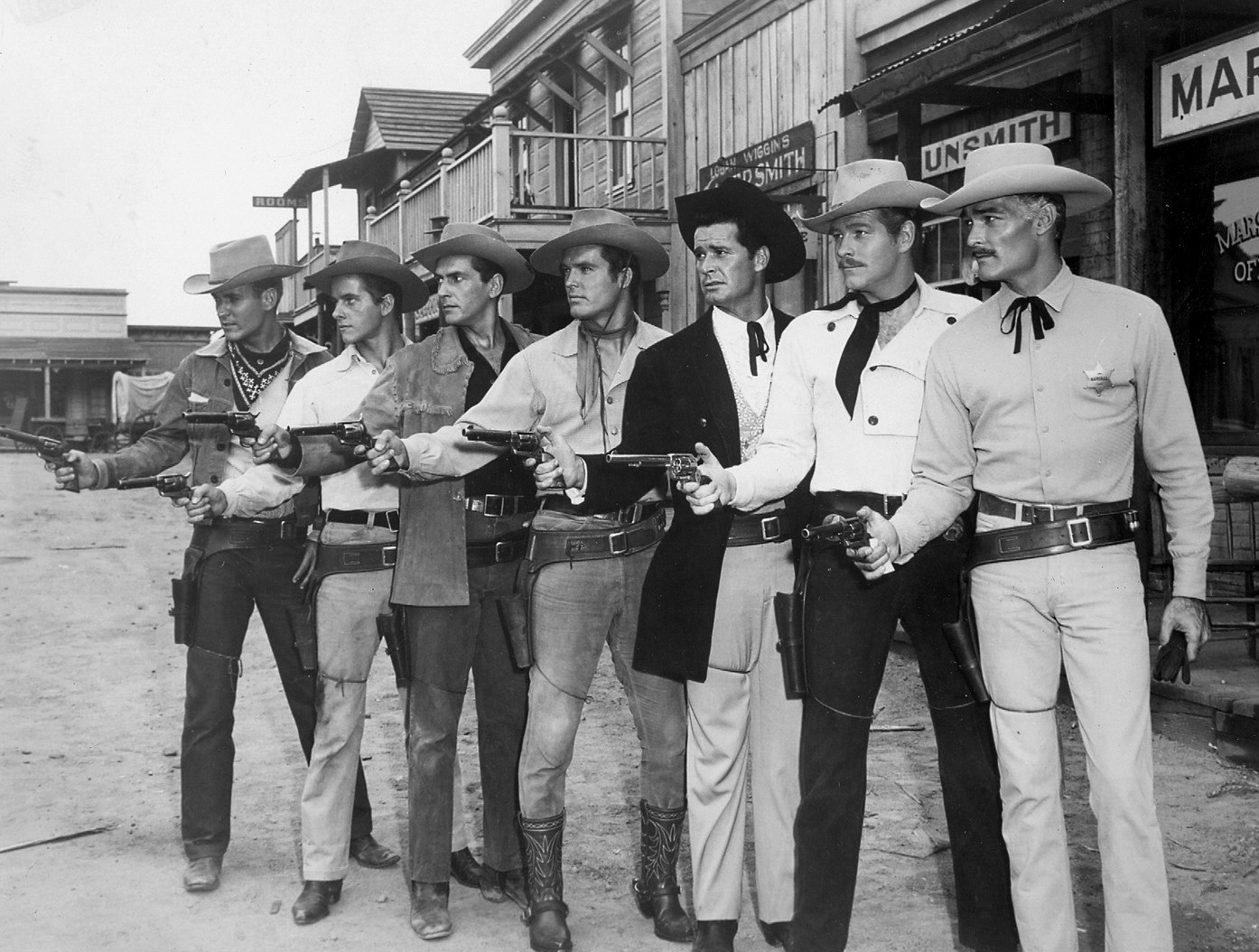
1959 Warner Bros. series leads Will Hutchins (Sugarfoot), Peter Brown (Lawman), Jack Kelly (Maverick), Ty Hardin (Bronco), James Garner (Maverick), Wayde Preston (Colt .45), and John Russell (Lawman)

Garner was a strong Democratic Party supporter.

On August 28, 1963, Garner was one of several celebrities to join Martin Luther King Jr. in the "March on Washington for Jobs and Freedom." In his autobiography, Garner recalled sitting in the third row listening to King's "I Have a Dream" speech.

"If there was an environmental cause, James Garner was there" — Zev Yaroslavsky

In July 1964, Garner, over a master plan for a 92-square-mile Santa Monica Mountains area, engaged in a public quarrel with Karl L. Rundberg, a Los Angeles City Council member, at a council meeting. Later, Garner, Steve McQueen and Burt Lancaster were named as founding members of the Friends of the Santa Monica Mountains conservancy group, according to the book Transforming California by Stephanie S. Pincetl, but that point was contested by Dash Stolarz, spokesperson for the state's Santa Monica Mountains Conservancy.

In the 1980s, Garner worked against oil drilling offshore of Will Rogers State Beach.

In 1982, Garner gave at least $29,000 to Federal campaigns, of which over $24,000 was to Democratic Party candidates, including Dennis Kucinich (for Congress in 2002), Dick Gephardt, John Kerry, Barbara Boxer, and various Democratic committees and groups.

For his role in the 1985 CBS miniseries Space, the character's party affiliation was changed from Republican to Democrat, as in the book, to reflect Garner's personal views. Garner said, "My wife would leave me if I played a Republican."

=== Friendship with Richmond Barthé ===
Garner became a friend, supporter and main benefactor of African-American sculptor Richmond Barthé, from the time the latter returned from Europe in 1977 and settled in Pasadena, until Barthé's death in 1989.

== Health issues and death ==
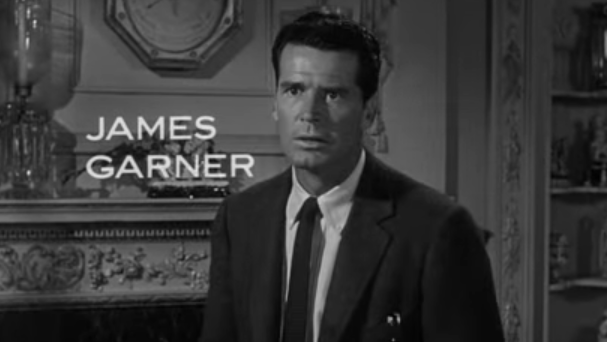
Children's Hour trailer

Garner's knees became a chronic problem during the filming of The Rockford Files in the 1970s, with "six or seven knee operations during that time." In 2000, he underwent knee replacement surgery for both knees.

On April 22, 1988, Garner had quintuple bypass heart surgery. Though he recovered rapidly, he was advised to stop smoking. Garner eventually quit smoking 17 years later in 2005. "My dad had smoked since he was 12 years old," recalled daughter Gigi Garner.

Garner underwent surgery on May 11, 2008, following a stroke he had suffered two days earlier. His prognosis was reported to be "very positive".

On July 19, 2014, police and rescue personnel were summoned to Garner's Brentwood, Los Angeles home, where they found the actor dead at the age of 86. He had a heart attack caused by coronary artery disease. He had been in poor health since his stroke in 2008.

Longtime friends Tom Selleck (who worked with Garner on The Rockford Files), Sally Field (who starred with Garner in Murphy's Romance), and Clint Eastwood (who guest-starred with Garner on Maverick and starred in Space Cowboys) reflected on his death. Selleck said, "Jim was a mentor to me and a friend, and I will miss him." Field said, "My heart just broke. There are few people on this planet I have adored as much as Jimmy Garner. I cherish every moment I spent with him and relive them over and over in my head. He was a diamond." Eastwood said, "Garner opened the door for people like Steve McQueen and myself."

== Awards and nominations ==
Garner was nominated for 15 Emmy Awards during his television career, winning twice: in 1977 as Outstanding Lead Actor in a Drama Series (The Rockford Files), and in 1987 as executive producer of Promise.

For contributions to the television industry, Garner received a star on the Hollywood Walk of Fame at 6927 Hollywood Boulevard.

In 1990, he was inducted into the Western Performers Hall of Fame at the National Cowboy & Western Heritage Museum in Oklahoma City, Oklahoma. He was also inducted into the Television Hall of Fame that same year. In February 2005, he received the Screen Actors Guild's Lifetime Achievement Award and was nominated for Outstanding Performance by a Male Actor in a Supporting Role that year, for The Notebook. When Morgan Freeman won the award, he led the audience in a sing-along of the original Maverick theme song.

In 2010, the Television Critics Association gave Garner its annual Career Achievement Award.

Accolade	Year	Category	Work	Result	Ref.
Academy Awards	1986	Best Actor in a Leading Role	Murphy's Romance	Nominated	
Golden Globe Awards	1958	Most Promising Newcomer – Male	Sayonara	Won	
Golden Globe Awards	1964	Best Motion Picture Actor – Musical/Comedy	The Wheeler Dealers	Nominated	
Golden Globe Awards	1978	Best TV Actor – Drama	The Rockford Files	Nominated	
Golden Globe Awards	1979	Best TV Actor – Drama	The Rockford Files	Nominated	
Golden Globe Awards	1980	Best TV Actor – Drama	The Rockford Files	Nominated	
Golden Globe Awards	1982	Best Performance by an Actor in a TV-Series – Comedy/Musical	Bret Maverick	Nominated	
Golden Globe Awards	1985	Best Performance by an Actor in a Mini-Series or Motion Picture Made for TV	Heartsounds	Nominated	
Golden Globe Awards	1986	Best Performance by an Actor in a Motion Picture – Comedy/Musical	Murphy's Romance	Nominated	
Golden Globe Awards	1987	Best Performance by an Actor in a Mini-Series or Motion Picture Made for TV	Promise	Nominated	
Golden Globe Awards	1991	Best Performance by an Actor in a Mini-Series or Motion Picture Made for TV	Decoration Day	Won	
Golden Globe Awards	1993	Best Performance by an Actor in a Mini-Series or Motion Picture Made for TV	Barbarians at the Gate	Won	
Golden Globe Awards	1994	Best Performance by an Actor in a Mini-Series or Motion Picture Made for TV	Breathing Lessons	Nominated	
Primetime Emmy Awards	1959	Best Actor in a Leading Role (Continuing Character) in a Dramatic Series	Maverick	Nominated	
Primetime Emmy Awards	1976	Outstanding Lead Actor in a Drama Series	The Rockford Files	Nominated	
Primetime Emmy Awards	1977	Outstanding Lead Actor in a Drama Series	The Rockford Files	Won	
Primetime Emmy Awards	1978	Outstanding Lead Actor in a Drama Series	The Rockford Files	Nominated	
Primetime Emmy Awards	1979	Outstanding Lead Actor in a Drama Series	The Rockford Files	Nominated	
Primetime Emmy Awards	1980	Outstanding Lead Actor in a Drama Series	The Rockford Files	Nominated	
Primetime Emmy Awards	1982	Outstanding Lead Actor in a Drama Series	Bret Maverick	Nominated	
Primetime Emmy Awards	1985	Outstanding Lead Actor in a Limited Series or a Special	Heartsounds	Nominated	
Primetime Emmy Awards	1987	Outstanding Drama/Comedy Special	Promise	Won	
Primetime Emmy Awards	1987	Outstanding Lead Actor in a Miniseries or a Special	Promise	Nominated	
Primetime Emmy Awards	1989	Outstanding Drama/Comedy Special	My Name is Bill W.	Nominated	
Primetime Emmy Awards	1989	Outstanding Supporting Actor in a Miniseries or a Special	My Name is Bill W.	Nominated	
Primetime Emmy Awards	1991	Outstanding Lead Actor in a Miniseries or a Special	Decoration Day	Nominated	
Primetime Emmy Awards	1993	Outstanding Lead Actor in a Miniseries or a Special	Barbarians at the Gate	Nominated	
Primetime Emmy Awards	1994	Outstanding Lead Actor in a Miniseries or a Special	Breathing Lessons	Nominated	
Screen Actors Guild Awards	1995	Outstanding Performance in a TV Movie or Miniseries	The Rockford Files: I Still Love L.A.	Nominated	
Screen Actors Guild Awards	1996	Outstanding Performance in a TV Movie or Miniseries	The Rockford Files: A Blessing in Disguise	Nominated	
Screen Actors Guild Awards	1999	Outstanding Performance in a TV Movie or Miniseries	Lagalese	Nominated	
Screen Actors Guild Awards	2005	Outstanding Performance by a Male Actor in a Supporting Role	The Notebook	Nominated	
Screen Actors Guild Awards	2005	Life Achievement Award	—N/a	Won	
Television Critics Association Awards	2008	TCA Career Achievement Award	—N/a	Nominated	
Television Critics Association Awards	2010	TCA Career Achievement Award	—N/a	Won	

=== Statue ===
In 2006, a 10-foot-tall (3.0 m) bronze statue of Garner as Bret Maverick was unveiled in Garner's hometown, Norman, Oklahoma, with Garner present at the ceremony.

== Notes ==
=== Bibliography ===
- Garner, James; Winokur, Jon (2011). The Garner Files: A Memoir. Introduction by Julie Andrews. Simon & Schuster. ISBN 978-1-4516-4260-5. OCLC 709673421.
- Riml, Walter (2013). Türk, Helma; Riml, Dr. Christian (eds.). Behind the Scenes... Gesprengte Ketten: The Great Escape. House Publication. Photos of the shooting The Great Escape.
