= Within These Walls (film) =

1945 film by H. Bruce Humberstone

- Theatrical release poster
- Directed by: H. Bruce Humberstone
- Screenplay by: Eugene Ling; Wanda Tuchock; Coles Trapnell
- Story by: James B. Fisher; Coles Trapnell
- Produced by: Ben Silvey
- Starring: Thomas Mitchell; Mary Anderson; Edward Ryan; Mark Stevens; B.S. Pully; Roy Roberts; John Russell; Norman Lloyd
- Cinematography: Clyde De Vinna; Glen MacWilliams
- Edited by: Harry Reynolds
- Music by: David Buttolph
- Production company: 20th Century Fox
- Distributed by: 20th Century Fox
- Release date: July 13, 1945
- Running time: 71 minutes
- Country: United States
- Language: English

Within These Walls is a 1945 American drama film directed by H. Bruce Humberstone and written by Eugene Ling and Coles Trapnell. The film stars Thomas Mitchell, Mary Anderson, Edward Ryan, Mark Stevens, B.S. Pully and Roy Roberts. The film was released on July 13, 1945, by 20th Century Fox.

== Plot ==
When a judge, Michael Howland, decries conditions at a state prison, the governor recommends he become the new warden. Howland accepts, requiring that his family move to a new home near the penitentiary. His daughter Anne understands the situation, but teen son Tommie is upset by it.

While introducing a new no-tolerance discipline to the prisoners, Howland meets convicted embezzler Steve Purcell, whose good behavior while serving his sentence impresses the warden after a jailhouse incident. Howland needs a driver for his family and entrusts Purcell with the job.

Befriending a couple of inmates, Tommie assists them with a breakout. After a quarrel with his father, Tommie leaves for college and does not see his family again for nearly two years. One day new prisoners are brought in and among them is Tommie, found guilty of an armed robbery.

The warden does not bend the rules for his son. His daughter, meantime, has fallen in love with Purcell, finding out he was innocent of his crime, taking the rap for his guilty brother. Ruthless inmate Martin Deutsch learns this from Tommie and uses this information against Purcell, saying he will inform on the brother if Purcell doesn't help him escape.

Tommie's conscience gets the better of him. He knocks out Purcell to keep him from the prison break. Deutsch, trapped at the gate by the warden's guards, shoots Tommie in the back. Howland pursues the fleeing Deutsch and guns him down.

== Cast ==
- Thomas Mitchell as Warden Michael Howland
- Mary Anderson as Anne Howland
- Edward Ryan as Tommie Howland
- Mark Stevens as Steve Purcell
- B.S. Pully as Harry Bowser
- Roy Roberts as Martin 'Marty' Deutsch
- John Russell as Rogers
- Norman Lloyd as Peter Moran
- Harry Shannon as Head Guard 'Mac' McCafferty
- Edward Kelly as Convict Michael Callahan
- Rex Williams as Hobey Jenkins
- Ralph Dunn as Pearson
- Dick Rush as Station agent
- William Halligan as Collins
- Fred Graham as Guard
- Joseph E. Bernard as Conductor
- Jack Daley as Conductor
