= Don Juan Quilligan =

1945 film by Frank Tuttle

- Theatrical release poster
- Directed by: Frank Tuttle
- Screenplay by: Arthur Kober; Frank Gabrielson
- Story by: Herbert Clyde Lewis
- Produced by: William Le Baron
- Starring: William Bendix; Joan Blondell; Phil Silvers; Anne Revere; B.S. Pully; Mary Treen; John Russell; Veda Ann Borg; Thurston Hall; Cara Williams; Richard Gaines; Hobart Cavanaugh
- Cinematography: Norbert Brodine
- Edited by: Norman Colbert
- Music by: David Raksin
- Production company: 20th Century Fox
- Distributed by: Twentieth Century-Fox Film Corporation
- Release date: June 1, 1945
- Running time: 75 minutes
- Country: United States
- Language: English
- Box office: $1 million

Don Juan Quilligan is a 1945 American comedy film directed by Frank Tuttle and written by Arthur Kober and Frank Gabrielson. The film stars William Bendix, Joan Blondell and Phil Silvers and was released on June 1, 1945, by 20th Century Fox.

== Plot ==
"Some men are born great, some achieve greatness, and some have greatness thrust upon them".... Right now, at the beginning, it should be understood that Don Juan Quilligan was none of these."

Barge captain Patrick Michael Quilligan, who carries nostalgia for his late mother, marries two women who remind him of her — barmaid Margie Mossrock who has her charming personality and Lucy Blake who has her home cooking skills.

== Cast ==
- William Bendix as Patrick Michael 'Don Juan' Quilligan
- Joan Blondell as Marjorie Mossrock
- Phil Silvers as 'Mac' MacDenny
- Anne Revere as Mrs. Cora Rostigaff
- B.S. Pully as Ed Mossrock
- Mary Treen as Lucy Blake
- John Russell as Howie Mossrock
- Veda Ann Borg as Beattle LaRue
- Thurston Hall as Judge at murder trial
- Cara Williams as Fifth Ave. Florist salesgirl
- Richard Gaines as Defense attorney
- Hobart Cavanaugh as Mr. Rostigaff
- Renee Carson as Annie Mossrock
- George Macready as District Attorney
- Helen Freeman as Mrs. Blake
- Charles Cane as Artie Mossrock

=== Cast note ===
Although some filmographies attribute the role of Marjorie Mossrock's baseball player brother Howie to child actor Johnnie Russell who was occasionally billed as "John" and whose last four films were released in 1940 when he was seven years old, the actor playing Howie is John Russell, star of the 1957–1962 TV Western series Lawman, who received his first on-screen credit in this film.
