= Yancy Derringer =

American action/adventure TV program

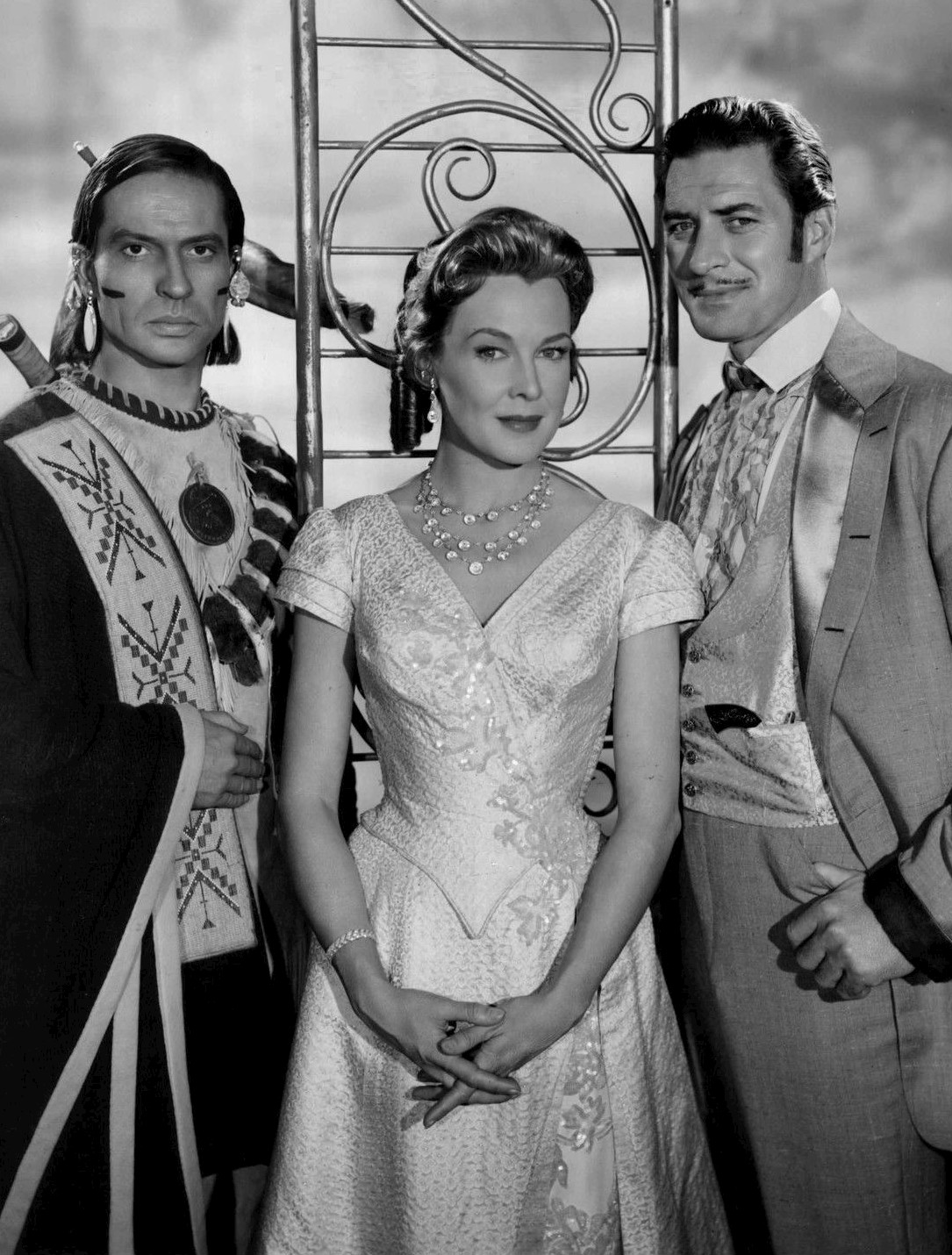
- X Brands, Frances Bergen and Jock Mahoney in 1959.
- Genre: Action/Adventure
- Created by: Mary Loos; Richard Sale
- Written by: Kellam de Forest; Marjorie Helper; Mary Loos; Richard Sale; Robert Spielman; Coles Trapnell
- Directed by: Richard Sale; William F. Claxton
- Starring: Jock Mahoney; X Brands; Frances Bergen; Kevin Hagen
- Country of origin: United States
- Original language: English
- No. of seasons: 1
- No. of episodes: 34

Production
- Executive producers: Warren Lewis; Don Sharpe
- Running time: 30 minutes
- Production companies: Sharpe-Lewis; Derringer Productions

Original release
- Network: CBS
- Release: October 2, 1958 – June 4, 1959

Yancy Derringer is an American action/adventure series that was broadcast on CBS from October 2, 1958, to June 4, 1959, with Jock Mahoney in the title role. It was broadcast from 8:30 to 9 p.m. Eastern Time on Thursdays.

== Background ==
The show was produced by Derringer Productions and filmed in Hollywood by Desilu Productions. Derringer Productions consisted of half interest for Warren Lewis and Don Sharpe as executive producers, a quarter interest to Jock Mahoney for starring in the series, and a quarter interest to Richard Sale and Mary Loos, husband and wife, as creators. The show's sponsor was S. C. Johnson & Son, and Klear floor wax was a regular sponsor.

Sale and Loos based the series on "The Devil Made a Derringer", a short story by Sale that appeared in All-American Fiction in 1938. Sale was one of the highest-paid pulp writers of the 1930s. The story was never mentioned, but it was about a destitute aristocrat and troublemaker who returns to New Orleans three years after the American Civil War. In the story, Derringer has no first name; "Yancy" was added for the television series.

== Overview ==
The eponymous character, Yancy Derringer, is an adventurer and gambler. He is a former Confederate Army Captain who has returned to New Orleans, Louisiana, in 1868, three years after the end of the American Civil War, during the southern Reconstruction Era. The state is under Union control and martial law. Life goes on in New Orleans, despite the fact that the city's atmosphere is foreboding, filled with trepidation and mourning. The Derringer family itself paid a heavy price in both lives and their family home and property during the Civil War. Yancy's brother David and his father Yancy Sr., died in the conflict.

Widely respected by all parts of New Orleans society as a Southerner who never surrendered, Derringer is recruited by the Federal City Administrator, John Colton, to work as a secret agent; only Colton knows of this special role. Often at the beginning of an episode, Colton, a former Union Army colonel, asks Yancy to help solve New Orleans' present threat. Often, by the end of an episode, he arrests Yancy for breaking the law in order to do it. Yancy agrees to be Colton's "huckleberry" for the good of the city and his interests."

Yancy has a strong conviction that the United States must be one nation again. Although he is based out of New Orleans, his Mississippi riverboat, the Sultana, and Yancy's propensity for adventure mean that some episodes take him far away from Louisiana; some stories take place as far away as Nevada and California.

Tommy Mara recorded the show's theme with an orchestra and chorus in 1959 for Felsted Records (Felsted 8561).

== Cast and characters ==
=== Main ===
Jock Mahoney - Yancy Derringer

- Yancy lives at the family plantation, Waverly, and also owns a riverboat, the Sultana. (The actual riverboat of the same name sank from an explosion and fire on April 27, 1865.) A lover of fine cuisine and the high life, he spends much of his leisure time at Madame Francine's Club (an exclusive members-only gambling house), the Sazerac Restaurant, or at the Charter House Restaurant, whose specialty is French cuisine.

When called to action, Yancy's weapons of choice are four-barrel Sharps pepperbox derringer handguns carried concealed (one held by a clamp inside the top of his hat, one in his vest's left pocket under his jacket and one up his jacket's left sleeve in a wrist holster) and a knife in his belt. (A belt buckle inset with a toy single-barrel derringer, sold by Mattel at the time and popularly associated with Yancy, did not resemble anything that the character actually used.) He is an expert marksman. He also carries a cane or a riding crop with hidden swords and is said to have iron fists: one punch and his opponent remains unconscious for a day. Yancy dresses elegantly, most often in a white suit with a long coat, ruffled white shirt, a silk vest, a sash instead of a belt, a black under-the-collar bow tie, and a white flat-topped straw hat with curled brim.

X Brands - Pahoo Ka-Ta-Wah

- Yancy's sidekick, Pahoo-Ka-Ta-Wah, is a silent Pawnee American Indian who communicates only by sign language. Pahoo-Ka-Ta-Wah is Pawnee for "wolf who stands in water" (as mentioned in the first episode). Although Pahoo is short on talk, he is long on action. Beneath a blanket wrapped about his body, he carries a sawed-off double-barreled shotgun loaded with split buckshot, which he wields in emergencies. Most of the time, however, he uses a throwing knife sheathed on his back.

Kevin Hagen - John Colton

- John Colton is the city administrator, and a hard-nosed, incorruptible leader who works tirelessly to clean up New Orleans. Colton is also clever, and knows that his position would be untenable if he were personally caught using questionable methods to clamp down on crime. He therefore uses Yancy to unofficially deal with situations that cannot be resolved by conventional means.

Frances Bergen – Madame Francine

- Yancy's recurring love interest is Madame Francine. She is the strong-willed, beautiful owner of a members-only gambling house in New Orleans, and she or her business are often involved in Yancy's adventures. Her real name is Nora and she is actually Irish.

Robert McCord, III – Captain Amos Fry

- Captain Amos Fry is the local head of the U.S. Secret Service who works closely with Colton to combat lawlessness in New Orleans. Fry does not know of Derringer's unpaid work as an espionage agent; often the amiable but plodding Fry is working on combating a problem in a legal manner, while Derringer—unconstrained by official law-enforcement policies and procedures—uses decidedly more unorthodox, colorful and possibly borderline-illegal methods to nullify the threat.

Richard Devon – Jody Barker

- Jody Barker is a respectable-looking Bourbon Street pickpocket. Yancy and Francine were wise to his ways, and frequently stopped him from fleecing club members. However, he was a useful source of information about doings in the criminal underworld, and sometimes participated in certain 'sting' operations for Yancy.

Larry J. Blake – Turnkey

- Yancy spent so much time in the local jail (usually put there by Colton or Fry), he became great pals with the jailer, who was addressed as "Turnkey". The genial Turnkey (played by Larry J. Blake) often played poker in the cells with Yancy, and, sympathetic to Yancy's situation, sometimes aided in (or at least turned a blind eye towards) Yancy's escape plans.

Bill Walker – Obadiah

- Obadiah is Derringer's African-American servant. A dignified pillar of the community, he is the head of a committee that represents "thousands of law-abiding citizens of New Orleans" in bringing a petition to the city administrator in the episode "V as in Voodoo". A club doorman addressed as Jeremiah is seen in a few episodes, but this character has no lines and is not credited.

=== Recurring ===
==== Madame Francine's club hostesses ====
- Patricia Blair – Goldy
- Charlene James – Pearl Girl
- Joan Boston – Opal
- Jane Burgess – Chrystal

==== Sultana crew ====
- Woody Chambliss – Captain Tom of the Sultana
- Gene Collins – Willy Quill, Sultana pilot

==== The Sazerac Club ====
- Lisa Lu – Miss Mandarin, owner/manager
- Sandy Kenyon – Willy Nilly, bartender at the Sazerac

==== Others ====
- Kelly Thordsen – Colorado Charlie
- Marvin Bryan – Lt. Bacon
- Margaret Field (billed as Maggie Mahoney) – Bridget Malone
- Claude Akins – Toby Cook
- Robert Lowery (actor) – Blair Devon
- Robert McCord III – Captain Amos Fry
- Beverly Garland – Coco LaSalle
- Noreen Nash – Agatha Colton
- Lee Kendall – Blackjack Benson
- Joan Taylor – Lavina Lake
- Mickey Morton – Wee Willie Benson
- James Foxx – The O'Hara
- John Qualen – Captain Sven Larsen

=== Guest stars ===
- Julie Adams – Amanda Eaton in "Return to New Orleans"
- Nick Adams – Grand Duke Alexis in "The Night the Russians Landed"
- Jack Albertson – Blind Bill in "Mayhem at the Market"
- Norm Alden – Crenshaw in "Marble Fingers"
- James Anderson – Fitch in "The Louisiana Dude"
- John Alderson – Marble Fingers in "Marble Fingers"
- Mari Aldon – Celeste Duval in "Mayhem at the Market"
- John Anderson – Wayne Raven in “Outlaw at Liberty”
- Richard Arlen – General Hugh Morgan in "A State of Crisis"
- Raymond Bailey – Colonel Duval in "Mayhem at the Market"
- Patricia Barry – Patricia Tappworth in “Thunder on the River"
- Arthur Batanides – Dink Saxon in “A Game of Chance“
- Charles Bateman – Captain Blythe in "A State of Crisis"
- Gerrie Bender – Katy in "The Night the Russians Landed"
- Val Benedict – Gunman in “Outlaw at Liberty”
- Nesdon Booth – Conductor in “Fire on the Frontier”
- Joan Boston – Opal in “The Wayward Warrior”
- Don Brodie – Ticket Seller in “Two Tickets to Promontory”
- Charles Bronson – Rogue Donovan in “Hell and High Water"
- Lillian Bronson – Carrie Meade in "Mayhem at the Market"
- Hillary Brooke – Julia Bulette in "The Louisiana Dude"
- Naaman Brown – Dr. YaYa in “V as in Voodoo”
- John Bryant – Joshua Devon in “"Three Knaves from New Haven"
- Paul Bryar – Harry Kidd in “V as in Voodoo”
- Walter Burke – Sneaky Joe in “Panic in Town"
- Jean Byron – Dorinda Ashton in “Ticket to Natchez”
- Thom Carney – Army Clerk in "A State of Crisis" and Conductor in “Gone But Not Forgotten“
- Robert Carricart – Thaddeus Stevens in “Fire on the Frontier”
- Zachary Charles – Dan Fitz in "A Bullet for Bridget"
- Ralph Clanton – Benjamin Quade in “A Game of Chance“
- John Cliff – Nat Greer in "The Louisiana Dude"
- Ann Codee – Madame Marie in "An Ace Called Spade"
- Booth Coleman – Henry Duval in "The Louisiana Dude"
- Charles Cooper – Harmon Steele in "Return to New Orleans"
- Robert Cornthwaite – Mathew Brady in "Collector's Item"
- Walter Coy – Slade Donovan in "A State of Crisis"
- Kathleen Crowley – Desiree in "Marble Fingers"
- Patricia Cutts – Lady Charity in “Hell and High Water"
- John Damler – Man in “Two Tickets to Promontory”
- Ruby Dandridge – Lily Rose Beam in “V as in Voodoo”
- Ray Danton – Spade Stuart in "An Ace Called Spade"
- Jim Davis – Bullet Pike in “Two Tickets to Promontory”
- John Dehner – Colonel Tate in "Memo to a Firing Squad"
- Brad Dexter – Charles Hammond in “V as in Voodoo”
- Val Dufour – Dean Salsbury in "Old Dixie"
- Joan Dupuis – Carrie in “Panic in Town"
- Kaye Elhardt – Sally Snow in “Outlaw at Liberty”
- Gene Evans – Lonesome Jackson in "The Saga of Lonesome Jackson"
- Frances Fong – Ruby in “The Quiet Firecracker”
- Dick Foran – Mr. Halligan in "Two of a Kind"
- Michael Forest – Pierre in "The Fair Freebooter"
- Louise Fletcher – twins Miss Nellie and Miss Alithia in "Old Dixie"
- Charles Fredericks – Jack Dingo in “Fire on the Frontier”
- Regina Gleason – Margot Chatham in “Fire on the Frontier”
- Leo Gordon – Lance Carter in "The Belle from Boston"
- Fred Graham – Laney in "A Bullet for Bridget"
- Otis Greene – Roy in "Return to New Orleans"
- Charles Gray – Clay Wellman in “Gone But Not Forgotten“
- Virginia Grey – Emily DuBois in “V as in Voodoo”
- Patricia Hardy – Gloria Stafford in "The Loot from Richmond"
- Holly Harris – Madame Hauptmann in “Panic in Town"
- Joe Haworth – Lieutenant in “Hell and High Water"
- Maggie Hayes – Ruby in "The Saga of Lonesome Jackson"
- Bill Henry – Fargo in “Gone But Not Forgotten“
- Reed Howes – American Captain in "The Night the Russians Landed"
- Harry Jackson – Professor Bates in “The Wayward Warrior”
- Joyce Jameson – Bonnie Mason in “Gone But Not Forgotten“
- Roy Jensen – Captain MacBain in “Longhair”
- Edwin Jerome – Claude de Graaf in “"Three Knaves from New Haven"
- Chubby Johnson – Spinner in "Old Dixie"
- Betty Lou Keim – Julie Randall in “Gone But Not Forgotten“
- Edward Kemmer – Dr. Frank Bishop in “Panic in Town"
- George Keymas – Biloxi in "Marble Fingers"
- Brett King – Jesse James in "Outlaw at Liberty"
- John Larch – Wayland Farr in “Two Tickets to Promontory”
- Mary LaRoche – Barbara Kent in "Nightmare on Bourbon Street"
- Harry Lauter – Francis Jordan in "Mayhem at the Market"
- Mary Lawrence – Priscilla Cole in “A Game of Chance“
- Ruta Lee – Romilly Vale in "Two of a Kind"
- Janet Lord – Elsie Tulliver in "Collector's Item"
- Karl Lukas – The Warrior in “The Wayward Warrior”
- Dayton Lummis – Judge Randall in “Gone But Not Forgotten“
- John Lupton – Major Alvin in "A State of Crisis"
- Rita Lynn – Vinnie Farr in “Two Tickets to Promontory”
- Theodore Marcuse – Alex Bristol in “The Quiet Firecracker”
- Lester Matthews – Jerrison Ames in "Old Dixie"
- Charles Maxwell – Barret Rankin in "A Bullet for Bridget"
- Ken Mayer – Shute O’Brien in “Thunder on the River"
- Dennis McCarthy – Hotel Clerk in “V as in Voodoo”
- Oliver McGowan – Dan Emerson in “Thunder on the River"
- Robert McQueeney – Howard Austin in “Two Tickets to Promontory”
- Tom McKee – General Cochran in "The Gun That Murdered Lincoln"
- Judi Meredith – Charlotte DuBois in “V as in Voodoo”
- Yvette Mimieux – Ricky in "Collector's Item"
- Irving Mitchell – Manager in “Panic in Town"
- Alberto Morin – Colonel Suvoroff in "The Night the Russians Landed"
- Robert Nash – Conductor in “Two Tickets to Promontory”
- George Neise – Charles Hunter in "Return to New Orleans"
- Anne Neyland – Wilma in "Collector's Item"
- Doug Odney – Webster in “Thunder on the River"
- J. Pat O'Malley – Captain Billy of the Sultana in “The Quiet Firecracker”
- Tom Palmer – Hotel Clerk in “Fire on the Frontier”
- Dennis Patrick – Earle Bartley in "The Loot from Richmond"
- Steve Pendleton – Sheriff Anderson in "The Louisiana Dude"
- William Pullen – Henri in “The Wayward Warrior”
- Stuart Randall – Marshal Ike Milton in "Gone But Not Forgotten" and “Gone But Not Forgotten“
- Donald Randolph – Bart Ogilvie in “Panic in Town"
- Paula Raymond – Lucy Maridale in “Gallatin Street”
- Carl Benton Reid – General Stafford in "The Loot from Richmond"
- Bert Remsen – Major James Sampson in "The Gun That Murdered Lincoln"
- Alan Reynolds – Overseer in “Duel at the Oaks”
- Addison Richards – Judge Harper in "The Louisiana Dude"
- Mark Roberts – Matthew Younger in "Marble Fingers"
- Stephen Roberts – Sheriff Peterson in “Outlaw at Liberty”
- Bartlett Robinson – Stephen Quayne in "The Saga of Lonesome Jackson"
- Robert Rockwell – Phillip Hampton in "Memo to a Firing Squad"
- Kasey Rogers – Black-eyed Sue in "Marble Fingers"
- Willard Sage – Senator Tyson Yardley in "The Gun That Murdered Lincoln"
- Hugh Sanders – Phillip Lorme in “Duel at the Oaks”
- Luke Saucier Jr. – Collins in “Gone But Not Forgotten“
- Karen Sharpe – Patricia Lee in "A Game of Chance"
- Dan Sheridan – George Slocum in "Return to New Orleans"
- Mickey Simpson – Tennessee Slasher in “The Wayward Warrior”
- John Stephenson – Arthur Travers in “"Three Knaves from New Haven"
- Peggy Stewart – Karen Ogilvie in “Panic in Town"
- Harry Swoger – Big Jim Ogden in "The Louisiana Dude"
- Charles Tannen – Captain Brown in “The Quiet Firecracker”
- Dan Tobin – Alvin Watson in “Fire on the Frontier”
- Lee Van Cleef – Ike Milton/Frank James in “Outlaw at Liberty”
- John Vivyan – Charles LeBow in “Duel at the Oaks”
- Clessia Wade – Devil Dancer in “V as in Voodoo”
- Jean Willes – Jessie Belle in “The Quiet Firecracker”
- Bill Williams – Duke Winslow in “Ticket to Natchez”
- Grant Williams – Colonel Custer in “Longhair”
- Marie Windsor – Billie Jo James in “Ticket to Natchez”
- Victor Sen Yung – Hon Lee in “The Quiet Firecracker”

== Reruns and syndication ==
After the program's single year on network television, its reruns found audiences in repeats and in syndication. NBC bought all 34 episodes from Don Sharpe Productions to show as part of the network's afternoon Adventure Theatre anthology series beginning February 8, 1960. In 1961, it was broadcast in at least 43 TV markets, including Chicago, Los Angeles, New York, and New Orleans. Official Films Inc. handled the distribution.

== Critical response ==
A review of the premiere episode in The New York Times called it "nonsensical" and "distinctive in its silliness". The review concluded, "Yancy Derringer is just too quaint to be entertaining."

The trade publication Broadcasting, in a review of the first episode, said, "this overloaded action series threatens to sink in the first patch of bayou quicksand."

== Episodes ==
No.	Title	Directed by	Written by	Original release date
1	"Return to New Orleans"	Richard Sale	Mary Loos & Richard Sale	October 2, 1958
In 1868, Yancy arrives home, penniless, after the war, only to discover he has a (woman posing as his) wife, Amanda Eaton (Julie Adams), he did not know about and that his family plantation, Waverly, has been turned into a gambling den. John Colton, the City Administrator of New Orleans, helps to return the Waverly to Yancy. John Colton asks Yancy to help rebuild New Orleans as his special agent.
2	"Gallatin Street"	William F. Claxton	Mary Loos and Richard Sale	October 9, 1958
Yancy helps a sea captain who was cheated out of his money in a dive on notorious Gallatin Street.
3	"Ticket to Natchez"	Richard Sale	Story by : Mary Loos & Richard Sale; Teleplay by : Herman Hoffman	October 23, 1958
City Administrator John Colton entrusts Yancy with an army payroll that is to be taken to Natchez, Mississippi, on Yancy's riverboat, the Sultana, but robbers have other plans. Guest star: Marie Windsor (Billie Joe)
4	"An Ace Called Spade"	Richard Sale	Story by : Mary Loos & Richard Sale; Teleplay by : D.D. Beauchamp & Richard Sale	October 30, 1958
Yancy is relieved to find that a newspaper story about City Administrator Colton's death is premature, but fears that Colton will be the victim of trickery in an upcoming duel. Guest star: Ray Danton (Spade Stuart)
5	"A Bullet for Bridget"	William F. Claxton	Story by : Mary Loos & Richard Sale; Teleplay by : Frederic Brady	November 6, 1958
We meet, for the first time, Bridget Malone, Madame Francine's cousin from Ireland, who, while visiting New Orleans, decides that Yancy is to be her future husband. Special guest star is star Jock Mahoney's real-life wife, Margaret Field, as Bridget Malone (as Maggie Mahoney).
6	"The Belle from Boston"	Richard Sale	Story by : Mary Loos & Richard Sale; Teleplay by : Alvin Sapinsley & Richard Sale	November 13, 1958
After City Administrator Colton hangs a member of an outlaw gang, the others decide to take revenge on his visiting sister.
7	"The Loot from Richmond"	William F. Claxton	Irving Wallace	November 20, 1958
A messenger is sent to New Orleans by a former general in the Civil War, but is killed before he can reveal what happened to a fortune that was taken from Richmond, Virginia.
8	"The Saga of Lonesome Jackson"	Richard Sale	Story by : Mary Loos & Richard Sale; Teleplay by : Alvin Sapinsley	November 27, 1958
A wealthy, but lonely, man who has come to New Orleans looking for a wife asks Yancy to help him.
9	"Memo to a Firing Squad"	William F. Claxton	Mary Loos and Richard Sale	December 4, 1958
An army officer with vengeance in his heart tries to stop a presidential pardon. Without the pardon, a man is scheduled to die before a firing squad. John M. Pickard, who plays Lieutenant Weems, is among the guest stars.
10	"Three Knaves from New Haven"	William F. Claxton	Story by : Theodore and Mathilde Ferro; Teleplay by : Theodore and Mathilde Ferro & Richard Sale	December 11, 1958
Shop owners receive threats of violence if they refuse to sell their property to three strangers. Special guest star is star Jock Mahoney's real-life wife, Margaret Field, as Bridget Malone (as Maggie Mahoney).
11	"Marble Fingers"	William F. Claxton	Story by : Richard Sale & Robert Spielman; Teleplay by : Robert Spielman	December 18, 1958
Yancy tries to find out who's responsible for recent grave robberies. Guest star: Kasey Rogers (Blackeyed Sue)
12	"Old Dixie"	Richard Sale	Story by : Mary Loos & Richard Sale; Teleplay by : John Hawkins & Richard Sale	December 25, 1958
Special Christmas episode. Villains go after Yancy's dog, Dixie, after Yancy's father dies, leaving a note that only the dog knows where the family pre-war fortune is buried. Special guest star is star Jock Mahoney's real-life wife, Margaret Field, as Bridget Malone (as Maggie Mahoney). Guest star: Louise Fletcher (Miss Nelly/Alithea)
13	"Two of a Kind"	William F. Claxton	Mary Loos and Richard Sale	January 1, 1959
Yancy and Pahoo are framed for a series of crimes and now face execution.
14	"Nightmare on Bourbon Street"	Richard Sale	Mary Loos & Richard Sale	January 8, 1959
A mysterious mad bomber steals explosives and threatens to blow up the entire city of New Orleans. Guest star: Mary LaRoche
15	"The Fair Freebooter"	Richard Sale	Mary Loos & Richard Sale	January 15, 1959
Yancy must deal with a female pirate, Coco LaSalle, who has stolen his shirts that he ordered from St. Louis. He goes after her into the deadly swamps. Colton tags along to recover a stolen necklace for representatives of the Mexican government.
16	"Mayhem at the Market"	Richard Sale	Theodore and Mathilde Ferro, Richard Sale (story by Theodore and Mathilde Ferro)	January 22, 1959
Merchants are in such fear for their lives that Yancy gets no cooperation in his attempt to break a new protection racket.
17	"The Night the Russians Landed"	Richard Sale	Coles Trapnell	January 29, 1959
A visiting Russian noble appears to have become a target for murder.
18	"A Game of Chance"	William F. Claxton	Mary Loos and Richard Sale	February 5, 1959
Yancy suspects foul play when a lottery winner dies before she can collect.
19	"Panic in Town"	Richard Sale	Coles Trapnell	February 12, 1959
A serial attacker is loose in New Orleans. He attacks women and cuts their hair. The authorities are seemingly powerless. A group of vigilantes decides to take over New Orleans.
20	"Hell and High Water"	Richard Sale	Richard Sale	February 19, 1959
It looks like New Orleans is going to be flooded. Obadiah suggests to Yancy a risky scheme to save New Orleans. John Colton is taken prisoner by Lady Charity to protect her plantation property from Yancy's risky scheme. Meanwhile, Rogue Donovan tries to kill Yancy. Guest stars: Charles Bronson (Rogue Donovan), Patricia Cutts (Lady Charity)
21	"The Louisiana Dude"	William F. Claxton	Coles Trapnell	February 26, 1959
Yancy wins a half interest in a silver mine. The Sultana's boiler blows up, and Yancy travels to Virginia City, Nevada, hoping to get five thousand dollars needed for a new boiler. Yancy discovers that his new partner is a beautiful woman. Guest stars: Hillary Brooke (Julia Bulette), John Cliff (Nat Greer), Harry Swoger (Big Jim Ogden), Addison Richards (Judge Harper), Steve Pendleton (Sheriff Anderson), Woodrow Chambliss (Captain Tom), James Anderson (Fitch), Booth Colman (Henry Duval)
22	"Longhair"	William F. Claxton	Story by : Kellam De Forest and Marjorie Helper; Teleplay by : Coles Trapnell	March 5, 1959
When famed General George Armstrong Custer visits New Orleans, Yancy discovers that he is being stalked by an indian seeking revenge for a past wrong. We meet, for the first time, Colorado Charlie, Indian scout.
23	"Thunder on the River"	William F. Claxton	Story by : Robert Spielman; Teleplay by : Robert Spielman & Richard Sale	March 12, 1959
Yancy decides to help a fellow riverboat owner whose fleet is being sabotaged by rivals trying to corner the market on river traffic. Guest star: Patricia Barry
24	"The Gun That Murdered Lincoln"	Richard Sale	Story by : Kellam De Forest & Marjorie Helper; Teleplay by : Richard Sale	March 19, 1959
Yancy is unjustly accused of having provided the weapon used by presidential assassin John Wilkes Booth.
25	"Collector's Item"	Richard Sale	Coles Trapnell	March 26, 1959
To assist a woman in her crusade to provide a home for the city's orphans, Yancy comes up with a scheme that requires the aid of photography pioneer Mathew Brady.
26	"Fire on the Frontier"	Richard Sale	Mary Loos, Richard Sale	April 2, 1959
Yancy's indian friend, Pahoo, becomes an important element in efforts to prevent a war with the Pawnee tribes. Guest stars: Robert Carricart (Thaddeus Stevens)
27	"Duel at the Oaks"	William F. Claxton	Coles Trapnell	April 9, 1959
Yancy is in trouble for killing a man in a duel. John Vivyan guest stars as LeBow.
28	"The Wayward Warrior"	Richard Sale	William Fay, Mary Loos, Richard Sale	April 16, 1959
Trying to stop some gun smugglers, Yancy has a run-in with a boxing champion and a rematch with a female river pirate, Coco LaSalle.
29	"A State of Crisis"	Edward Denault	Coles Trapnell	April 30, 1959
With the city of New Orleans plagued by counterfeit money, General Hugh Morgan arrives in New Orleans with orders promoting John Colton to a post in Washington and giving Morgan command of the city. Walter Coy guest stars as Slade Donovan.
30	"Outlaw at Liberty"	William F. Claxton	Coles Trapnell & Richard Sale	May 7, 1959
Yancy is at a loss to figure out what's going on when an old wartime friend is charged with murder.
31	"V as in Voodoo"	Edward Denault	Mary Loos, Richard Sale	May 14, 1959
Yancy tries to combat superstition when the city is terrorized by a mysterious voodoo priestess.
32	"The Quiet Firecracker"	Boris Sagal	Mary Loos, Richard Sale	May 21, 1959
Yancy's good friend Miss Mandarin (Lisa Lu) is accused of smuggling opium into the city inside firecrackers.
33	"Gone But Not Forgotten"	Edward Denault	Richard Sale	May 28, 1959
A friend of Yancy's comes to visit from Virginia City with news that his silver mine is doing well, but that there is a gravestone in the cemetery with Yancy's name on it. Dayton Lummis plays Judge Randall. Guest star: Joyce Jameson (Bonnie Mason)
34	"Two Tickets to Promontory"	Richard Sale	Coles Trapnell & Richard Sale	June 4, 1959
On a train trip to a celebration of the completion of the transcontinental railroad, Yancy discovers a saboteur.

== Home media ==
On October 9, 2012, Timeless Media Group released the complete series on DVD for the first time in Region 1.
