= B. S. Pully =

American actor

- Publicity photo
- Born: Murray Lerman; May 14, 1910; Newark, New Jersey, U.S.
- Died: January 6, 1972 (aged 61); Philadelphia, Pennsylvania, U.S.
- Occupations: Actor; comedian
- Years active: 1944–1970

B. S. Pully (born Murray Lerman; May 14, 1910 – January 6, 1972) was a New York nightclub comedian and stage actor who created the role of "Big Jule" in the musical Guys and Dolls. He was noted for his blue humor and thick, gravelly voice.

== Biography ==
Born in Newark, New Jersey, Pully began his career on the Borscht Belt. In an interview with historian Kliph Nesteroff, entertainer Freddie Roman recalled, "B. S. Pully was a burlesque kind of comic. Very low class until he got lucky and got that part in Guys and Dolls, which changed his life. He had a partner. It was B. S. Pully and H. S. Gump [the initials, they explained, meant "bullshit" and "horseshit"]. There was a little nightclub up in the Catskill Mountains – not attached to a hotel – and they would spend the summer up there."

Pully was under contract briefly to 20th Century-Fox in 1944 and 1945, working in 13 feature films. He played a tough-guy quiz-show contestant in Take It or Leave It (1944), a gruff Christmas-tree vendor in A Tree Grows in Brooklyn (1945), and Joe the Bartender in Nob Hill (1945).

He achieved fame originating the Big Jule role in the original Broadway production of Guys and Dolls, appearing in more than 1,000 performances. He also played the role in the 1955 film version. He remained in New York and appeared in guest roles in the New York-based TV series Car 54, Where Are You?

B. S. Pully died of a heart attack in Thomas Jefferson University Hospital in Philadelphia, Pennsylvania, at age 61. He was buried in Cedar Park Cemetery, Emerson, New Jersey.

== Filmography ==
Year	Title	Role	Notes
1944	Four Jills in a Jeep	Soldier	Uncredited
1944	Pin Up Girl	Sergeant	Uncredited
1944	The Eve of St. Mark	Waiter	Uncredited
1944	Take It or Leave It	Oliver D. Nelson, Truck Driver	Uncredited
1944	Wing and a Prayer	Flat Top	
1944	In the Meantime, Darling	Civilian at Railroad Station	Uncredited
1944	Greenwich Village	Brophy	
1944	Something for the Boys	Cab Driver	Uncredited
1945	A Tree Grows in Brooklyn	Christmas Tree Vendor	
1945	Don Juan Quilligan	Ed Mossrock	
1945	Nob Hill	Joe the Bartender	
1945	Within These Walls	Harry Bowser	
1946	Do You Love Me	Taxi Driver	Uncredited
1953	Taxi	Amchy	Uncredited
1953	Main Street to Broadway	Himself	Uncredited
1955	Guys and Dolls	Big Jule	
1959	A Hole in the Head	Hood	
1960	The Bellboy	Steve – Head Gangster	
1967	Matchless	Taxi Driver	Uncredited
1968	Lady in Cement	Man in Strip Show with Transvestite	Uncredited
1969	The Love God?	J. Charles Twilight	
1970	Myra Breckinridge	Tex	(final film role)
