= Coles Trapnell =

American TV producer, writer, and director

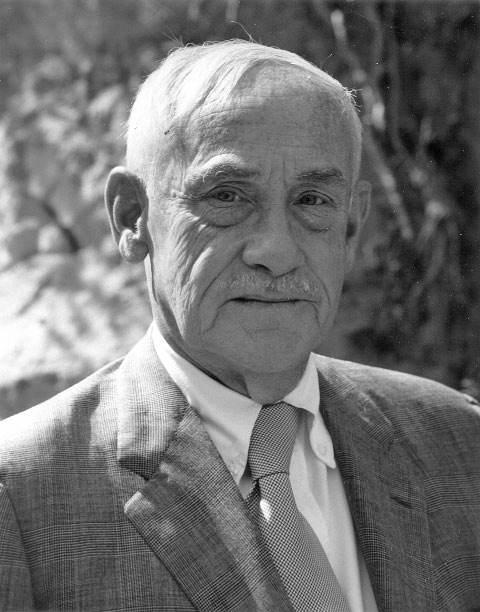
- Born: Valentine Coles Trapnell; August 2, 1910; New York City
- Died: January 29, 1999; Los Angeles, CA
- Occupation(s): Television producer Screenwriter; Television director
- Years active: 1940s-1960s
- Spouse: Jean Hamilton Brown

Valentine Coles Trapnell (August 2, 1910 – January 29, 1999) was an American television producer, writer, and director most famous for a stint following Roy Huggins as the producer of the Warner Bros. Western series Maverick starring James Garner, Jack Kelly, and Roger Moore, beginning with the show's third season. Trapnell also wrote scripts for Yancy Derringer, Lawman, and Twelve O'Clock High, and authored the book Teleplay; an introduction to television writing (original edition, 1966; revised edition, 1974).
