= List of Magnum, P.I. episodes =

Magnum, P.I. is an American crime drama television series starring Tom Selleck as Thomas Magnum, a private investigator in Hawaii. The series ran on CBS, which broadcast 162 first-run episodes over eight seasons, from December 11, 1980, to May 1, 1988.

== Series overview ==
Season	Episodes	Originally released		Rank	Rating
Season	Episodes	First released	Last released	Rank	Rating
1	18	December 11, 1980	April 16, 1981	14	21.0
2	22	October 8, 1981	April 1, 1982	17	20.9
3	23	September 30, 1982	April 28, 1983	3	22.6 (Note: Tied with M*A*S*H)
4	21	September 29, 1983	May 3, 1984	6	22.4
5	22	September 27, 1984	April 4, 1985	15	19.1
6	21	September 26, 1985	April 10, 1986	46	14.6
7	22	October 1, 1986	April 15, 1987	33	16.1
8	13	October 7, 1987	May 1, 1988	40	14.4

== Episodes ==
=== Season 1 (1980–81) ===
No. overall	No. in season	Title	Directed by	Written by	Original release date
1	1	"Don't Eat the Snow in Hawaii"	Roger Young	Donald P. Bellisario & Glen A. Larson	December 11, 1980
2	2	"Don't Eat the Snow in Hawaii"	Roger Young	Donald P. Bellisario & Glen A. Larson	December 11, 1980
In the pilot episode, Magnum accidentally uncovers a drug operation in the islands when picking up an old Navy friend of his at the airport and helps his friend's sister uncover the truth about a conspiracy involving the NIA and Southeast-Asian drug dealers. Magnum makes a casual reference to predecessor series Hawaii Five-O after his pursuers drive over a cliffside. When his friend winds up dead, Magnum must find his killers and uncover a smuggling ring that leads him to people from his past during the Vietnam War. Note: Originally shown as a two-hour pilot film, but in syndication is shown as two separate episodes.
3	3	"China Doll"	Donald P. Bellisario	Donald P. Bellisario	December 18, 1980
Magnum is hired by a Chinese woman to protect her very valuable vase and finds himself chased by a special martial-arts practicing hitman.
4	4	"Thank Heaven for Little Girls and Big Ones Too"	Bruce Seth Green	Babs Greyhosky	December 25, 1980
When Magnum is hired by a group of young girls to find their teacher Linda Booton (Katherine Cannon), he runs into a plot involving kidnapping and art theft.
5	5	"No Need to Know"	Lawrence Doheny	Frank Lupo	January 8, 1981
Higgins plays host to a British military General and Magnum is asked by the Central Intelligence Agency to protect him from the IRA.
6	6	"Skin Deep"	Lawrence Doheny	Donald P. Bellisario	January 15, 1981
An actress's suicide leads Magnum to investigate and he uncovers foul play.
7	7	"Never Again...Never Again"	Robert Loggia	Story by : Jim Carlson & Terrence McDonnell; Teleplay by : Babs Greyhosky	January 22, 1981
When a Jewish friend of Magnum's disappears, Magnum helps his wife to locate the man and uncovers a Nazi plot.
8	8	"The Ugliest Dog in Hawaii"	Lawrence Doheny	Allan Cole & Chris Bunch & Frank Lupo	January 29, 1981
Magnum helps protect a dog from being kidnapped by a gangster and his two nephews. Guest stars: Michael V. Gazzo and Kathleen Nolan Note: First episode to feature the Mike Post and Pete Carpenter Magnum, P.I. theme music. It can be heard throughout the episode and over the closing credits from this episode onwards but it is not used yet over the opening credits until the episode number 12, "Thicker Than Blood".
9	9	"Missing in Action"	Robert Loggia	Story by : Craig Buck; Teleplay by : Craig Buck & Ken Pettus	February 5, 1981
Laura Frasier (Rebecca Holden), a singer at the club has premonitions of her long lost boyfriend eight years ago and Magnum helps to track him down, only to find that he's involved in a secret naval military special forces outfit, Delta Force.
10	10	"Lest We Forget"	Lawrence Doheny	Donald P. Bellisario	February 12, 1981
A Supreme Court nominee hires Magnum to locate his ex-prostitute wife who has been missing since the Pearl Harbor Attacks forty years earlier. Guest stars: Miguel Ferrer, José Ferrer, Anne Lockhart and June Lockhart Note: Miguel Ferrer and Anne Lockart act as the 1941 alter egos of the characters, which are played by their father/ mother.
11	11	"The Curse of the King Kamehameha Club"	Winrich Kolbe	Babs Greyhosky	February 19, 1981
Magnum investigates when a kahuna places a curse on the King Kamehameha Club. Guest star: Sol K. Bright Sr. as Makua Wani
12	12	"Thicker Than Blood"	Lawrence Doheny	Donald P. Bellisario	February 26, 1981
When T.C. is arrested by the United States Coast Guard for smuggling a deserter of the United States Marine Corps into the islands, Magnum and Rick must uncover their best friend's real motives, but also discover a plot made by drug smugglers. Guest stars: Vincent Caristi and André Philippe. This episode was the immediate answer to the episode number 8, "The Ugliest Dog in Hawaii". Note: First episode to open with the Mike Post and Pete Carpenter theme music.
13	13	"All Roads Lead to Floyd"	Ron Satlof	Story by : Rogers Turrentine; Teleplay by : Rogers Turrentine & Babs Greyhosky	March 12, 1981
With just a ten year old postcard as a clue, Magnum is hired by a Kansan woman, Cindy Lewellyn (Anne Bloom), to find her missing father Floyd (Noah Beery) who's a small-time con man on the run. Notes: Guest star Red West.
14	14	"Adelaide"	Lawrence Doheny	Robert Hamilton	March 19, 1981
Magnum is hired by Adelaide (Christine Belford), a jockette and her uncle (Cameron Mitchell) to protect their prize-winning racing horse.
15	15	"Don't Say Goodbye"	Winrich Kolbe	Story by : T.J. Miles; Teleplay by : T.J. Miles & Babs Greyhosky	March 26, 1981
Magnum is hired by a blind friend to negotiate with a blackmailer and discovers a plot to murder his friend. Notes: Mercedes McCambridge previously starred with Tom Selleck as "Ma Sackett" in the television film The Sacketts. Ted Danson also later appeared with Selleck in the films Three Men and a Baby and Three Men and a Little Lady.
16	16	"The Black Orchid"	Ray Austin	Robert Hamilton	April 2, 1981
Magnum is hired to participate in a rich woman's, Louise DeBolt Jackson (Judith Chapman) theatrical fantasy game, as long as Rick and TC, but things become complicated when her disapproving husband Wyndom (John Ireland) gets involved and the game turns deadly.
17	17	"J. "Digger" Doyle"	Winrich Kolbe	Donald P. Bellisario	April 9, 1981
Because of a threat to his life, Robin Masters (voiced by Orson Welles) hires Joy "Digger" Doyle (Erin Gray) to check the security at the estate. She meets Magnum, and, pretending to be a big fan of Robin's, manages to penetrate the estate. The security agency locks down Robin's Nest and enlists the help of Magnum, Rick and TC to prevent a hit on Robin. Higgins is kidnapped in the process, but Magnum and Digger manage to save him. Magnum later discovers that the plot to kill Robin emanates from within the security agency. Note: This was a backdoor pilot episode for an unmade spin-off series.
18	18	"Beauty Knows No Pain"	Ray Austin	Robert Hamilton	April 16, 1981
In the middle of a criminal case, Magnum enters the Hawaiian Iron Man Triathlon with the help of his friends and Barbara Terranova (Marcia Wallace), an overzealous trainer, who hires Magnum to find her fiancé.

=== Season 2 (1981–82) ===
No. overall	No. in season	Title	Directed by	Written by	Original release date
19	1	"Billy Joe Bob"	Ray Austin	Jeff Wilhelm	October 8, 1981
Billy Joe Bob (James Whitmore Jr.), a hotheaded Texan, engages Magnum's services when his sister, Carol Ann, goes missing. Magnum has his hands full trying to keep Billy Joe from beating up every local who gets in his way and trying to find Carol Ann, who has gotten in over her head with the wrong crowd.
20	2	"Dead Man's Channel"	Ray Austin	Diane Frolov	October 15, 1981
After her archaeologist father's boat is found deserted at sea in the Nihoa Channel, a marine biology student hires Magnum to find out what happened to him. The local natives warn Magnum to stay away from the "cursed" channel, but he's determined to find out what happened to the missing man. Note: Roger E. Mosley as T.C. does not appear in this episode.
21	3	"The Woman on the Beach"	Donald P. Bellisario	Andrew Schneider	October 22, 1981
Rick falls in love with a beautiful woman (Judith Chapman) he met on the beach. The woman, however, turns out to have been murdered forty years prior. Magnum must investigate the case and prove that Rick is not seeing a ghost, while tracking down the woman's killer.
22	4	"From Moscow to Maui"	Michael Vejar	Andrew Schneider	October 29, 1981
A year after escaping from Moscow in a MiG 23 fighter jet, a Soviet defector hires Magnum to help his girlfriend defect from an Olympic track team visiting Hawaii. She is under close watch of undercover KGB agents, and Magnum, T.C. and Rick, with assistance from Higgins, must carry out their plan with military precision to free her. Notes: The "MIG" is actually an F-4 with a red star painting. The plot connects to the 1980 Summer Olympics boycott. The plot of episode "Olympiad" of Buck Rogers in the 25th Century is almost identical.
23	5	"Memories Are Forever"	Ray Austin	Donald P. Bellisario	November 5, 1981
24	6	"Memories Are Forever"	Ray Austin	Donald P. Bellisario	November 5, 1981
While working on a routine case, Magnum believes he has spotted Michelle (Marta DuBois), the woman he married while he was serving in the Vietnam War and who he thought had been killed in a bombing raid. T.C. and Rick are suspicious of the sighting but Magnum begins a thorough search of the area to find her. However, his search for Michelle places him in uncomfortable political territory. Magnum's desperate search for Michelle faces a halt after he has been called up for active Navy duty status and ordered to testify in Washington. Magnum suspects that it is a political smokescreen to try to stop pursuing the Michelle's trail. Magnum is briefly reunited with Michelle, who is married to Vietnamese General Hue (Soon-Tek Oh), who is involved in delicate negotiations regarding repatriation of MIA and POW remains from Vietnam. Michelle is suspected of being a traitor and is in great danger.
25	7	"Tropical Madness"	Lawrence Doheny	Robert Hamilton	November 12, 1981
Magnum is surprised when a beautiful woman from England, Jennifer Chapman (Devon Ericson) spurns his advances—much to the amusement of T.C. and Rick—preferring Higgins. Magnum is certain the woman is feigning interest in Higgins to somehow use him for an ulterior motive and plans to uncover the truth. Higgins sees his doubts as jealousy and the relationship between the two men is pushed towards the breaking point.
26	8	"Wave Goodbye"	Sidney Hayers	Reuben Leder	November 19, 1981
An ex-surfing champion and friend of Magnum's turns up dead on the beach and Magnum investigates. The prime suspects are a local drug pusher and a Vietnam vet, but Magnum believes someone else may be involved.
27	9	"Mad Buck Gibson"	Winrich Kolbe	Robert Hamilton	November 26, 1981
Magnum is asked by Joan (Vera Miles), the ex-wife of the adventure-seeking author Mad Buck Gibson (Darren McGavin) to keep him out of harm's way until she collects the alimony he owes her. But this task proves to be difficult as Magnum learns that Mad Buck is harboring a secret that could be the reason for his self-destructive behavior.
28	10	"The Taking of Dick McWilliams"	Winrich Kolbe	Diane Frolov	December 3, 1981
The Japanese wife (Irene Yah-Ling Sun) of an old Navy buddy (Guy Stockwell) comes to Magnum for help when her husband is kidnapped and held for ransom. She asks Magnum to handle the ransom drop without telling her father (John Fujioka), who never approved of the marriage in the first place. However, the deeper Magnum gets into the case, the more suspicious he becomes of the circumstances.
29	11	"The Sixth Position"	Sidney Hayers	Babs Greyhosky	December 17, 1981
As a favor to Robin Masters, Magnum finds himself acting as bodyguard to a famous ballerina, Kendall Chase (Andrea Marcovicci) after she has had several attempts made on her life, and T.C.'s previously undeclared love of ballet comes in handy, with him more than willing to help Magnum out on a case for once. Meanwhile, Rick accepts a job on Magnum's behalf to investigate a woman's husband, but Magnum becomes suspicious that the timing of the job is rather too coincidental and comes to suspect that he's been hired for another reason.
30	12	"Ghost Writer"	Ray Austin	Caroline Elias	December 24, 1981
Magnum is hired by Virginia Fowler (Patch Mackenzie), an attractive "ghost writer" who is writing a biography of eccentric millionaire Harold Farber (Elisha Cook)—whom she has never met in person, communicating only via phone—when all her notes on Farber are stolen, in an attempt to stop the book ever being written. Meanwhile, T.C. has landed himself a highly lucrative, but shady, piloting job delivering chemicals to a high-rise, but the building he is making the deliveries to turns out to be at the center of the mystery. Notes: Hollywood veteran Elisha Cook went on to play Rick’s underworld associate Ice Pick, in several later episodes.
31	13	"The Jororo Kill"	Alan J. Levi	Story by : Donald P. Bellisario & Reuben Leder & Andrew Schneider & Alan Sutterfield; Teleplay by : Donald P. Bellisario & Reuben Leder & Andrew Schneider	January 7, 1982
Kate Sullivan (Tyne Daly), a journalist, and an old friend of Thomas, Rick, and T.C. from the Vietnam days, arrives in Hawaii and asks for Magnum's help in tracking down David Bannister (Christopher Morley) for an interview. She claims Bannister left MI6 to write an exposé. Magnum finds out that he has become an international assassin and that his latest target is a Prime Minister visiting from a small island republic whom Kate will also interview. However, Magnum becomes suspicious of Kate's determination to get the story up close and personal.
32	14	"Computer Date"	Robert C. Thompson	Babs Greyhosky	January 14, 1982
While Magnum works on a case of computer espionage, the president of the company asks him to also investigate his wife, who he believes is having an affair. After Magnum begins his investigation, his loyalties are tested when he sees that she is indeed having an affair... with Rick!
33	15	"Try to Remember"	Mike Vejar	Andrew Schneider & Reuben Leder	January 28, 1982
After waking up from a car crash while on a case, Magnum suffers from amnesia, having not been able to account for several missing hours. When the person his client hired him to find winds up dead, Magnum becomes a suspect and must prove his innocence and find the real killer. Notes: Two new characters - who become recurring characters on the show, are introduced in this episode: Doc Ibold and Honolulu Police Homicide Detective, Lieutenant Tanaka.
34	16	"Italian Ice"	Gilbert Shelton	Donald P. Bellisario	February 4, 1982
Robin asks Magnum to fly to Sicily to rescue the daughter of a friend of Robin's, Katrina Tremaine (Ann Dusenberry), who was being held by mobsters. The woman develops an immediate crush on Magnum, which puts his new relationship with Margo Perina (Mimi Rogers) in jeopardy. Later, when the mobsters turn up on the island, trouble kicks into high gear.
35	17	"One More Summer"	Rod Daniel	Story by : Reuben Leder & Del Reisman; Teleplay by : Reuben Leder	February 11, 1982
When an old Naval Academy friend and teammate, Dorsey Bramlett, now a professional quarterback for the New Jersey Blazers, is nearly murdered, he asks Magnum to go undercover at his football team's training camp to protect him. Magnum's job is made all the more difficult by the strenuous workouts he must endure in training camp! Guest star: Pat Morita.
36	18	"Texas Lightning"	Mike Vejar	Robert Hamilton	February 18, 1982
Card shark Jeannie Lowry (Julie Sommars), a.k.a. "Texas Lightning", hires Magnum as her bodyguard at a high-stakes poker game aboard a luxurious yacht. But Magnum learns the poker game is just a facade and Jeannie is hiding something about her true intentions. Magnum and Jeannie are forced to make a hasty escape from the yacht and become stranded on a deserted island, later presumed dead.
37	19	"Double Jeopardy"	Robert Totten	Story by : Babs Greyhosky & Reuben Leder & Bill Taub; Teleplay by : Babs Greyhosky & Reuben Leder	February 25, 1982
Robin's Nest is used as the location for a film starring Olivia Ross (Dana Wynter) and her husband Jack Martin (Larry Pennell). Magnum is less-than-enthusiastic about being hired as Jack's stunt double and takes the job only because of his admiration for Olivia. But, when Jack is critically injured during a key scene in which Olivia shoots her husband with a prop gun—and the gun turns out to be loaded with real bullets—then Magnum investigates the mysterious circumstances.
38	20	"The Last Page"	Alan J. Levi	Andrew Schneider	March 4, 1982
Taylor Hurst (Robert F. Lyons), a Vietnam War veteran, whom Magnum distantly knows from a mission they both served on during the war, hires him to supposedly find his missing girlfriend. Unbeknownst to Magnum, the man actually has an ulterior motive and is using him to track down an old adversary with whom he has an old score to settle.
39	21	"The Elmo Ziller Story"	Mike Vejar	Robert Hamilton	March 25, 1982
Magnum meets Higgins' illegitimate half-brother, a swaggering Texan named Elmo Ziller (John Hillerman in a dual role), who was supposedly murdered. Now, Ziller's daughter, Lexi (Robin Dearden) asks Magnum to protect her father from ruthless killers, while Ziller asks Magnum to prove that his wife is trying to murder him. Meanwhile, Magnum cannot help but think that Higgins and Elmo are the same person.
40	22	"Three Minus Two"	Sidney Hayers	Robert Van Scoyk	April 1, 1982
Jan Kona (Jill St. John), a beautiful leading fashion designer hires Magnum to protect her when one of her two partners in their designer clothing company is murdered, and she suspects that the other partner may have been behind it. But the assignment proves tricky as several people had a strong enough motive for the murder, and someone is planning a revenge killing.

=== Season 3 (1982–83) ===
"Did You See the Sunrise?", "The Eighth Part of the Village", "Past Tense", "Black on White", "Flashback", "Heal Thyself" and "Faith and Begorrah" were the highest-rated episodes in the show's history, and were all respectively the highest-rated television events at all during their initial broadcasts.

No. overall	No. in season	Title	Directed by	Written by	Original release date
41	1	"Did You See the Sunrise?"	Ray Austin	Donald P. Bellisario	September 30, 1982
42	2	"Did You See the Sunrise?"	Ray Austin	Donald P. Bellisario	September 30, 1982
Magnum, T.C., and an ex-army buddy named Nuzo (James Whitmore Jr.) try to track down Ivan (Bo Svenson), a Soviet KGB officer who held them captive during the Vietnam War. Nuzo claims Ivan has been stalking him, and that Ivan is after all of them. Meanwhile, Lieutenant "Mac" MacReynolds (Jeff MacKay), claiming that he has resigned from the Navy, starts hanging around Magnum. In reality, Mac is working under Buck Green's orders to keep tabs on Magnum because Magnum's name has surfaced in connection with a Soviet intel operation set to take place in Hawaii. After a night out at a bar, Mac is killed when he gets into Magnum's Ferrari ahead of Magnum by a car bomb. Magnum vows revenge. Magnum discovers that Nuzo, who is actually Ivan's operative, has hypnotized T.C. and convinced him to kill a visiting Japanese dignitary. Magnum stops T.C. in time, but due to diplomatic immunity Ivan is set free, his next target perhaps being the president. With Rick's help, Magnum captures Ivan, who admits to killing Mac (in an attempt to kill Magnum), and taunts Magnum and tells him that he cannot do anything to stop him. At the end of the episode, Magnum asks Ivan, "Did you see the sunrise?", echoing a wish Mac had expressed with his last words. Ivan replies "yes", and Magnum turns towards Ivan, raises his gun, and fires. Note: In 2009, TV Guide ranked this episode number 88 on its list of the 100 Greatest Episodes.
43	3	"Ki'i's Don't Lie"	Lawrence Doheny	Bob Shayne & Philip DeGuere	October 7, 1982
Magnum is assisted by the Simon brothers (Gerald McRaney and Jameson Parker) in finding a stolen Hawaiian artifact that's supposedly cursed. Guest star: Morgan Fairchild Note: This episode begins a crossover event that concludes on Simon & Simon season 2 episode 1. In the original broadcast version, Higgins joins Simon & Simon in pursuing the woman who tricked him, with Magnum himself only appearing at the beginning and end. But a second conclusion was also shot for repeat and syndication purposes (the fleeing villain is caught), allowing the Magnum P.I. episode to be wrapped up so that it may be later rerun as a "stand alone" episode.
44	4	"The Eighth Part of the Village"	James Frawley	George Geiger	October 14, 1982
After narrowly avoiding being shot during a case, a fortune cookie convinces Magnum that it's time to repay his friends and associates, leading him to collect a crate of books from the docks for Higgins, only to find that it contains the daughter of a war comrade of Higgins who's searching for her American fiancée and seeking to escape her cruel father.
45	5	"Past Tense"	Michael O'Herlihy	Reuben Leder	October 21, 1982
There's terror in the sky when two bad guys posing as tourists hijack T.C.'s helicopter and force him to fly to a nearby prison where a breakout is taking place.
46	6	"Black on White"	Alan J. Levi	Donald P. Bellisario	October 28, 1982
Magnum manufactures a fake quarantine in effort to keep an eye on and protect Higgins from Kenyans taking revenge for a 1950s massacre by killing members of Higgins' old army regiment.
47	7	"Flashback"	Ivan Dixon	Lance Madrid III	November 4, 1982
Magnum dreams he's in 1936—populated with versions of his friends—where he's working for a young woman whose father, a union leader, has been accused of the murder of a construction magnate. Note: Lance Madrid III is a pseudonym for Robert Hamilton.
48	8	"Foiled Again"	Michael Vejar	Tom Greene	November 11, 1982
Magnum struggles to prove Higgins' innocence after he becomes the prime suspect in the murder of his old boarding school nemesis, William Troubshaw (Paxton Whitehead).
49	9	"Mr. White Death"	Jeff Hayden	Reuben Leder	November 18, 1982
An aging, former professional wrestling champion, Mr. White Death (Ernest Borgnine) asks Magnum to find his long-lost son, but the elements of his story do not ring true.
50	10	"Mixed Doubles"	Burt Kennedy	Robert W. Gilmer & Reuben Leder	December 2, 1982
Practicing to take part in an upcoming pro-am tennis tournament, Magnum is assigned by Robin Masters to protect a spoiled young tennis star, Carrie Reardon (Kim Richards) who is receiving death threats. Thomas finds his patience tested by the girl's bratty behavior, but is pleased that the tournament sees him reunited with an old flame—who it turned out to be the girl's main competitor and thus the prime suspect.
51	11	"Almost Home"	Ivan Dixon	Story by : Alan Cassidy; Teleplay by : Alan Cassidy & Robert W. Gilmer	December 9, 1982
When a feisty cocktail waitress, Bridget Archer (Kathleen Lloyd) is denied permission to scatter her late father's ashes at the USS Arizona Memorial in Pearl Harbor due to a court martial ruling that he was AWOL, she turns to Magnum to prove her father was indeed present during the infamous Japanese raid. Note: The names of the characters in this episode—Brigid Archer and her dead father Miles Archer—are taken from the Dashiell Hammett novel The Maltese Falcon.
52	12	"Heal Thyself"	Leo Penn	Robert W. Gilmer	December 16, 1982
Karen Harmon (Marcia Strassman), a doctor who was a nurse during Magnum's days in Vietnam is accused of poisoning patients, he tries to clear her name, but is puzzled by her and her husband's rebuffing his offer of assistance and irritated by an aggressive reporter.
53	13	"Of Sound Mind"	Mike Vejar	Andrew Schneider	January 6, 1983
Magnum is stunned when Wilson Arthur MacLeish (Donnelly Rhodes), an eccentric millionaire whom he worked for, is killed in a plane explosion and leaves him nearly his entire fortune—which includes a videotape suggesting he expected to be murdered by a relative looking to get his money. Guest stars: Elaine Joyce, Michael DeLano and Roscoe Lee Browne
54	14	"The Arrow That Is Not Aimed"	James Frawley	Miyoko Hensley & Steven Hensley	January 27, 1983
Higgins sends Magnum to collect a valuable Kenzan porcelain plate, newly purchased by Robin Masters, from the airport, but the artifact, which was entrusted to the care of a samurai warrior named Tozan (Mako) while in transport from Japan, has been stolen by a ninja. Magnum teams with the samurai, but they must work fast, as the samurai code of honor dictates Tozan must commit Seppuku if the precious plate is unretrieved.
55	15	"Basket Case"	Ivan Dixon	Julie Friedgen	February 3, 1983
T.C. and Magnum train their respective junior basketball teams for an upcoming game. T.C.'s team seems to have the advantage until Magnum meets a spunky young teenage girl named Willie (Dana Hill), with a great game and persuades her to join his team. Magnum and Higgins take a shine to the girl, but discover that her foster parents Bob (William Schallert) and Vera (Jo Pruden) are criminals who are using her as a pawn in running their con games.
56	16	"Birdman of Budapest"	Mike Vejar	Louis F. Vipperman	February 10, 1983
Magnum helps Elizabeth Barrett (Sylvia Sidney), a woman looking to interview a reclusive bird expert, unaware she's actually a KGB assassin out to kill the man for his involvement in the 1956 Hungarian revolt. Meanwhile, he has troubles collecting his fee from a man whose beautiful employee (Jacqueline Selleck) is tough enough to shoot out the Ferrari's windshield to keep Magnum at a distance from her boss.
57	17	"I Do?"	Ivan Dixon	Robert W. Gilmer	February 17, 1983
To smoke out the thief in a large family-owned business, Magnum feigns marriage to the CEO's niece, Marsha (Katherine Cannon), who drives a mean limousine and cannot resolve how she feels about men, marriage and Magnum.
58	18	"Forty Years from Sand Island"	Mike Vejar	Rogers Turrentine & Robert W. Gilmer and Reuben Leder	February 24, 1983
As part of the research for an upcoming Robin Masters novel, Higgins contacts a witness in the 1942 murder of a WWII Japanese internment camp inmate by a civilian guard and soon after is badly injured in an accident when the Ferrari's brakes fail. When the mechanic confirms that someone has tampered with the car, Magnum sets out to find who wants to stop Higgins's research and uncovers blackmail and shady politics at the center of the case.
59	19	"Legacy from a Friend"	Stuart Margolin	Robert Hamilton	March 10, 1983
When his lifeguard friend Marcus Phillips (St. John Smith) is found dead on the beach the day after he is seen sporting an expensive unaffordable new car, Magnum suspects foul play. Tracy Spencer (Annie Potts), a young woman with an ambition to rise in the ranks of the police department joins him in the investigation, and they uncover secrets at the center of Marcus' life which led to his death.
60	20	"Two Birds of a Feather"	Virgil W. Vogel	Donald P. Bellisario	March 17, 1983
Magnum investigates the crash of a small plane in the Estate's tidal pool and discovers it was not accidental and that the pilot Sam Houston Hunter (William Lucking), he vaguely recalls, helped save him in the Vietnam War. Note: This episode was a backdoor pilot for an unmade series.
61	21	"...By Its Cover"	Mike Vejar	Rogers Turrentine & Donald P. Bellisario and Robert W. Gilmer	March 31, 1983
A friend of Magnum's from his Navy days, "Hot" Rod Crysler (Stuart Margolin), is being blackmailed by a corrupt narcotics officer into delivering marijuana, and when Magnum stumbles onto this, he seeks to clear his friend's name.
62	22	"The Big Blow"	Alan J. Levi	Reuben Leder	April 7, 1983
A hurricane battering the islands cannot hinder Robin Masters' spring equinox party, a lavish event attended by a close circle of friends (Sondra Currie, James Doohan and Barry Van Dyke), but the arrival of a pregnant young woman with identical twin boys and two ex-cons intent on grand larceny does. Further complicating matters is Robin's assertion that one of his guests is plotting to kill him that evening.
63	23	"Faith and Begorrah"	Virgil W. Vogel	Donald P. Bellisario	April 28, 1983
Magnum needs some luck o' the Irish when he's hired to determine if a man's wife is cheating, and during the investigation meets Higgins's half-brother, Fr. Paddy McGuinness (John Hillerman in a dual role), an Irish priest who believes that a relic (containing the ashes of burnt croziers) was stolen during a search for I.R.A. weapons.

=== Season 4 (1983–84) ===
No. overall	No. in season	Title	Directed by	Written by	Original release date
64	1	"Home from the Sea"	Harvey Laidman	Donald P. Bellisario	September 29, 1983
Magnum's tradition of spending the Fourth of July alone at sea turns to a life-and-death battle when his surf ski capsizes due to a reckless boater and a strong current takes him further and further from land. Forced to tread water for hours in shark-infested waters, Thomas uses his memories of his mom and dad to keep himself alive while Higgins, T.C., and Rick begin a frantic search for him.
65	2	"Luther Gillis: File #521"	Virgil W. Vogel	Reuben Leder	October 6, 1983
When Magnum and old school private eye Luther H. Gillis (Eugene Roche) encounter each other in a seedy hotel room with a dead drug dealer as they separately investigate the whereabouts of Nancy Perkins (Melora Hardin), a St. Louis teenage runaway, they decide to team up to find the missing girl after the police burst into the room and arrest them on suspicion of murder.
66	3	"Smaller Than Life"	Alan J. Levi	J. Rickley Dumm	October 13, 1983
Trouble comes in all shapes and sizes when childhood friend Waldo Norris (Cork Hubbert) asks Rick to help him investigate an insurance claim for a priceless figurine. Rick then becomes suspicious of his friend's identity, but the truth of Waldo's identity may put an even higher price on finding the missing piece.
67	4	"Distant Relative"	Virgil W. Vogel	Nick Thiel	October 20, 1983
Magnum reluctantly agrees to chaperone Rick's prim and proper 22-year-old sister Wendy (Alice Cadogan) and then finds himself trying to keep up with a wild hellion. The girl goes missing after dragging Magnum to a low-life nightclub, but things take an even more bizarre twist when the police find her murdered in an alley.
68	5	"Limited Engagement"	Harvey S. Laidman	Story by : Stephen Katz & Richard Yalem; Teleplay by : Richard Yalem & Jay Huguely	November 3, 1983
A strange series of convenience store robberies introduces Magnum to the LaSalle sisters, Madge (Mildred Natwick) and Jeanie (Martha Scott), two elderly women who are about to be evicted from their run-down boarding house. While still pursuing the perpetrator of the robberies, Magnum and Higgins take it upon themselves to organize a charity bingo game for the little old ladies.
69	6	"Letter to a Duchess"	Bernard L. Kowalski	Robert Hamilton	November 10, 1983
While Magnum prepares for an annual surf-ski race, Higgins has his hands full hiding the beautiful Lady Wilkerson (Jane Merrow) from two shady pursuers. Smitten by the maiden in distress, Higgins sends her a letter expressing his feelings, but she mistakenly thinks the amorous words are from Magnum. It quickly becomes a case of romance on the run when the duchess is kidnapped and the two "Romeos" must spring into action to save her.
70	7	"Squeeze Play"	Harry Falk	Reuben Leder	November 17, 1983
A not-so-friendly bet between Robin Masters and ruthless magazine publisher Buzz Benoit (Dick Shawn) could leave Magnum and Higgins on the street unless they can beat Benoit's team in a high-stakes softball game. Magnum thinks their chances of beating Benoit's beautiful magazine models is pretty high, until he learns that Buzz has brought in professionals to play.
71	8	"A Sense of Debt"	Ivan Dixon	Jay Huguely	December 1, 1983
After he runs into - literally - Vietnam veteran and professional boxer Leon Platt (Denny Miller), T.C. steps into the ring in order to win a boxing prize that will save the man and his daughter, Ima (Shannen Doherty) from destitution. Higgins summons Magnum back from a job in Detroit to help before T.C.'s sense of guilt knocks him out for good. Guest stars: Alan Trammell and Lou Whitaker
72	9	"The Look"	Harry Falk	Louis F. Vipperman	December 8, 1983
A familiar voice on the radio leads Magnum to Holly Hudson (Gretchen Corbett), a popular Saigon disc jockey. Magnum discovers that Holly's been the recent victim of some very vocal death threats, but she's more concerned about the whereabouts of her missing fiancé.
73	10	"Operation: Silent Night"	Mike Vejar	Chris Abbott-Fish & Reuben Leder	December 15, 1983
Christmas Eve holds some unusual surprises when Magnum, T.C., Rick and Higgins find themselves stranded on a deserted island that the Navy uses for gunnery practice. As a Navy ship looking to do a little artillery work looms on the horizon, will the night end with peace and happiness for all?
74	11	"Jororo Farewell"	Ivan Dixon	Story by : Fay Nakagawara; Teleplay by : Reuben Leder	January 5, 1984
The Little League International Goodwill Tournament becomes a site of terror for the young Crown Prince of Jororo, who plays center field for the visiting team. Magnum befriends the young boy and puts his own life on the line when he finds out there is a royal assassination plot in play. Guest star: John Saxon
75	12	"The Case of the Red-Faced Thespian"	Ivan Dixon	Robert Hamilton	January 19, 1984
It's murder most foul when Higgins is struck on the head with a stray croquet ball right before a lavish Great Gatsby-themed costume ball is scheduled to be held at Robin's Nest. As Magnum rushes to keep things under control, some priceless jewels go missing, and an addled Higgins finds himself the prime suspect in the murder of one of the guests.
76	13	"No More Mr. Nice Guy"	Mike Vejar	Story by : Robert W. Gilmer; Teleplay by : Nick Thiel	January 26, 1984
Magnum is forced to forgo his much-anticipated trip to the Army-Navy football game and a reunion with his 1967 championship teammates when Rick, T.C. and Higgins guilt him into remaining in Hawaii and helping Deputy District Attorney Carol (Kathleen Lloyd) save her career by setting up a sting operation and nabbing one of the largest drug distributors in the islands. This is because Carol was mysteriously fired from her job when her investigations were beginning to harvest results. Infuriated by the treatment handed to her, she convinces Magnum, Higgins, T.C. and Rick to help her complete her mission and expose the drug lord's mole in the police department. Feeling used, Magnum and his friends eventually back out - until Carol is kidnapped.
77	14	"Rembrandt's Girl"	James Frawley	Chris Abbott-Fish	February 2, 1984
Susan Johnson (Carol Burnett) asks Magnum for his assistance to stop her father's criminal activities.
78	15	"Paradise Blues"	Bernard L. Kowalski	Story by : Chris Abbott-Fish & Chas. Floyd Johnson; Teleplay by : Chris Abbott-Fish	February 9, 1984
Love is truly blind when T.C. drags Magnum to a meeting with a gorgeous jazz singer, Alexis Carter (Leslie Uggams), whom T.C. fell in love with years ago in Vietnam. Magnum warns that trouble follows Alexis wherever she goes, and sure enough, she reveals she's on the run from dangerous Detroit drug dealers.
79	16	"The Return of Luther Gillis"	John Llewellyn Moxey	Reuben Leder	February 16, 1984
St. Louis gumshoe Luther H. Gillis returns to Hawaii, accompanied by his secretary Blanche Rafferty (Sheree North), to attend the annual Private Investigators convention, where Luther has been informed he will receive an award. But while Luther and Magnum attend the convention, Higgins and Blanche are kidnapped from the Estate, and the two P.I.'s find themselves having to join forces once again. Note: This was a pilot for a Luther Gillis spinoff that was not his character's only appearance in the series and never was picked up.
80	17	"Let the Punishment Fit the Crime"	Bernard L. Kowalski	Robert Hamilton	February 23, 1984
While Higgins is preparing to direct a selection of pieces from Gilbert and Sullivan's comic opera The Mikado, to be staged at the Estate, Magnum is hired by Sally DeForest (Kay Lenz), an attractive young woman to find her missing brother, whom she claims has disappeared after joining a religious cult. The girl has musical experience and agrees to help out with rehearsals of Higgins' production while Magnum looks for her missing brother.
81	18	"Holmes Is Where the Heart Is"	John Llewellyn Moxey	Judy Burns & Jay Huguely	March 8, 1984
As he continues his memoirs, Higgins recalls the spring of 1976 when a friend from Sandhurst, David Worth (Patrick Macnee), arrives in Oahu to attend the funeral of a mutual friend. Insisting that his name is Sherlock Holmes, and that Higgins is Watson, David firmly believes that their friend was murdered by none other than Moriarty, Sherlock Holmes' arch-nemesis.
82	19	"On Face Value"	Harry S. Laidman	Nick Thiel	March 15, 1984
A high-speed car chase between Magnum and some black-market operatives spins wildly out of control when a young woman, Emily Jackson (Talia Balsam) gets caught in the crossfire. But when he continues to have run-ins with the devious thugs, he begins to wonder if this "innocent victim" might be more than she seems.
83	20	"Dream a Little Dream"	Roger E. Mosley	Reuben Leder	March 29, 1984
It's a case of deja vu when Magnum is reunited with Karen Teal (Cindy Pickett), an attractive woman who was his first client five years earlier. She calls for his help once more with concerns that she and her young daughter are being threatened by some surfer punks right before a North Shore surfing competition.
84	21	"I Witness"	John Llewellyn Moxey	Chris Abbott-Fish & Reuben Leder	May 3, 1984
When the King Kamehameha Club is robbed by thieves wearing animal masks, the three principal eyewitnesses have different stories about what happened and how their heroic skills saved the day from complete disaster. Now Magnum must go by instinct to figure out what is fact and what is fiction before the armed thugs strike again.

=== Season 5 (1984–85) ===
No. overall	No. in season	Title	Directed by	Written by	Original release date
85	1	"Echoes of the Mind"	Georg Stanford Brown	Donald P. Bellisario	September 27, 1984
86	2	"Echoes of the Mind"	Georg Stanford Brown	Donald P. Bellisario	October 4, 1984
Part 1: A young woman named Diane Dupres (Sharon Stone) claims she is being stalked by her twin sister, Deirdre, and hires Magnum to investigate. Magnum breaks his number one rule and becomes romantically involved with a female client. Diane begins to show signs of paranoid delusions when she calls Thomas in a panic claiming to have shot a man at her residence although Magnum and Higgins can find no obvious signs of an attack. Magnum stays at her residence out of concern for her well being, and the episode ends with Magnum taking a shower and Diane (or is it Deirdre?) stepping in to join him. Part 2: The morning after Thomas's sleepover it becomes apparent that Diane has multiple personalities when "Deirdre" emerges and disparages Diane as weak and naive, while describing herself as strong and sexy. In the end, Diane becomes too distraught to live and commits suicide. Note: Part 1 features, in the prologue, the music of the end credits of the film Blade Runner, composed by Vangelis.
87	3	"Mac's Back"	Alan J. Levi	Donald P. Bellisario	October 11, 1984
Following the death of Diane, Magnum becomes depressed thinking about those in his life who have died or been taken from him, including his father, his wife, and his friend Lieutenant "Mac" MacReynolds (who was killed in "Did You See the Sunrise?: Part 1"). After a period of mourning, Magnum drives to Honolulu, where he sees a uniformed sailor bearing a strong resemblance to "Mac" (Jeff MacKay). Magnum rushes back to Robin's nest to tell his friends, and they think Magnum is off. Magnum combs Honolulu and Pearl Harbor before he finds that "Mac" is another Naval officer trying to get some Marine Corps pilots off the hook for illegal gambling. The "new Mac" makes an appearance at Robin's nest to prove he is not a figment of Magnum's imagination.
88	4	"The Legacy of Garwood Huddle"	Vincent McEveety	Richard Yalem	October 18, 1984
Garwood Huddle (Pat Hingle), an old friend of Higgins, turns up at the estate after escaping from prison. Garwood was a notorious bank robber in the 1940s recruited by Higgins during World War II to steal Nazi intelligence from a bank in Mexico City. He has escaped from prison to rescue his kidnapped grandson. Magnum agrees to help recover the child, and a report on a local TV station showing discrepancies between statements by the toddler's mother, Frannie (Belinda Montgomery) and her fiancé Walt Brewster (John Ratzenberger) gives Magnum the clue he needs to solve the crime and find Garwood III.
89	5	"Under World"	Ivan Dixon	Reuben Leder	October 25, 1984
T.C. finds himself in troubled waters when he agrees to make some curious inter-island deliveries, but before he can make the drop-off, his helicopter plunges into the sea.
90	6	"Fragments"	David Hemmings	Story by : Nick Thiel & David Chomsky; Teleplay by : Nick Thiel & Donald P. Bellisario	November 1, 1984
A psychic named Laura Bennett (Samantha Eggar) hires Magnum to save her from the future she's seen for herself - being murdered. Meanwhile, Magnum also finds danger in trying to get paid by Archie (Kenneth Mars), a sneaky car salesman client. Higgins organizes a benefit variety show. Note: This is the last episode to be written or co-written by Donald P. Bellisario, although he shares story credit on the season six premiere "Deja Vu".
91	7	"Blind Justice"	Russ Mayberry	Chris Abbott-Fish	November 8, 1984
Magnum wrestles with his conscience when he discovers evidence proving both that a man on trial for murdering his wife is innocent, but that got away with a different murder and contributed to his wife's death. Meanwhile, Higgins, tired of Magnum's slackness around the Estate, takes use of the Ferrari away from him.
92	8	"Murder 101"	Ivan Dixon	Rogers Turrentine	November 15, 1984
At the urging of the students in the private investigation class that Magnum is teaching at a local university, he takes on the investigation into the disappearance of a student's fiancé as the class' field work.
93	9	"Tran Quoc Jones"	Russ Mayberry	Chris Abbott-Fish	November 29, 1984
Magnum finds himself surprisingly attached to his young client, Tran Quoc Jones (Roland Harrah III), a preteen Vietnamese boy who lost his mother and whose only hope in the world is to find his missing G.I. father.
94	10	"Luther Gillis: File #001"	Ivan Dixon	Reuben Leder	December 6, 1984
Robin and Higgins simultaneously ask Magnum to do some investigative work, so Magnum calls on St. Louis-based gumshoe Luther Gillis (Eugene Roche) to nail the man who's blackmailing Higgins, while Magnum goes undercover to investigate embezzlement in a bank owned by Robin's friend.
95	11	"Kiss of the Sabre"	John Patterson	Jay Huguely	December 13, 1984
Betty Windom (Cassie Yates), a writer friend of Robin's stays at the estate and soon involves herself in Magnum's insurance investigation of a hit-and-run, leading to her incorporation of Magnum and the case into her story.
96	12	"Little Games"	Arthur Allan Seidelman	Deborah M. Pratt	January 3, 1985
Hoping to make up for crashing the estate's security system, Magnum has Mac fix it and challenges Krista Villaroch (Jenny Agutter), a beautiful insurance security specialist, to certify it's acceptable for the estate to host a jewelry competition.
97	13	"Professor Jonathan Higgins"	Peter Medak	Story by : Mary Lee Gaylor; Teleplay by : Jay Huguely	January 10, 1985
After Agatha and her friends are swindled out of $10,000 by a shady investment company, she hires Magnum to track down the crooks and retrieve their money. Meanwhile, Higgins's distant cousin, Sally Ponting (Jillie Mack) arrives from England to marry the heir of a local socialite and turns out to be a punk rocker in need of a drastic makeover before she can be accepted into society.
98	14	"Compulsion"	David Hemmings	Chris Abbott-Fish	January 24, 1985
Appearances can be deceiving when Magnum tries to convince Carol that she's not seeing signs pointing to the next case as being her last, and Higgins finds himself in a rough spot when his former Sandhurst comrades believe he's the owner of Robin's estate!
99	15	"All for One"	Mike Vejar	Reuben Leder	January 31, 1985
100	16	"All for One"	Mike Vejar	Reuben Leder	February 7, 1985
Part 1: Tyler Peabody McKinney (Robert Forster), an old commando acquaintance, asks Magnum, Rick, and T.C. to help him rescue a buddy who is held prisoner after being captured in Chong Ker, Cambodia by Vietnamese soldiers. Part 2: Magnum, Tyler and Higgins are held prisoner by the Vietnamese major that has a reign of terror over Chong Ker. As Rick recovers from his wounds, T.C. works with a local he's befriended trying to repair an old helicopter for their escape, but it becomes apparent that Tyler has been deceitful about the true nature of the mission.
101	17	"The Love-for-Sale Boat"	Ray Austin	J. Miyoko Hensley & Steven Hensley	February 14, 1985
Jim "Mac" Bonnick is back, and he takes Rick for a ride by "selling" him a luxury boat and three beautiful geishas. Some angry yakuza businessmen and the boat's actual owners are not pleased.
102	18	"Let Me Hear the Music"	David Hemmings	Jay Huguely	February 21, 1985
Magnum is hired by country musician Lacy Fletcher (Dennis Weaver) to unearth five songs written over 25 years ago by legendary country singer George Lee Jessup shortly before his death, and it seems that Lacy is not the only person searching for the songs.
103	19	"Ms. Jones"	Ray Austin	Phil Combest	March 7, 1985
A reluctant Magnum is hired by Madeline Jones (Margie Impert), as referred as the "hall of Records clerk" who often aggravates him with excessive red tape, to help her find her husband, Ray (Sam Anderson), an expert computer programmer who has disappeared after completing work on a valuable new artificial intelligence formula.
104	20	"The Man from Marseilles"	John Llewellyn Moxey	Reuben Leder	March 14, 1985
Jean Claude Fornier (Paul Verdier), a famous, internationally-known French detective—the real-life model for a series of best-selling novels by Robin Masters—who is staying at the estate, asks Magnum's help in locating a missing heir he's trying to track down.
105	21	"Torah, Torah, Torah"	Leo Penn	Martin Sage & Sybil Alderman	March 28, 1985
When Magnum picks up a rabbi friend of Higgins', Asher Solomon (Nehemiah Persoff) at the airport they're ambushed, a valuable Torah is stolen, and the investigation of the theft leads Magnum to a gang of smugglers.
106	22	"A Pretty Good Dancing Chicken"	Bernard L. Kowalski	Story by : Joe Gores & Anthony Pellicano; Teleplay by : Jay Huguely & Joe Gores	April 4, 1985
Magnum's behind bars when he goes undercover as a convict in order to seek clues about the disappearance of Carol's 17-year-old niece.

=== Season 6 (1985–86) ===
"Déjà Vu" (the two-part season opener), "Who Is Don Luis Higgins", "I Never Wanted to Go To France, Anyway", "Going Home", "Round and Around" and "Rapture" were the highest-rated episodes of Season 6, garnering the most viewers during their initial broadcasts, with "Rapture" and "Déjà Vu" getting the highest ratings during rebroadcasts.

No. overall	No. in season	Title	Directed by	Written by	Original release date
107	1	"Déjà Vu"	Russ Mayberry	Story by : Donald P. Bellisario & Chris Abbott-Fish; Teleplay by : Chris Abbott-Fish	September 26, 1985
108	2	"Déjà Vu"	Russ Mayberry	Story by : Donald P. Bellisario & Chris Abbott-Fish; Teleplay by : Chris Abbott-Fish	September 26, 1985
While Magnum and Higgins are in London setting up Robin Masters' new estate, Magnum looks into a war buddy's death, and Higgins wonders if he should visit his father. Magnum helps Penelope (Francesca Annis) to continue to investigate Geoffrey's death and learns of Higgins' reluctance to visit his father (John Hillerman in a dual role). Guest star Peter Davison
109	3	"Old Acquaintance"	Ivan Dixon	Jill Sherman Donner	October 3, 1985
Goldie Morris (Lee Purcell), an old friend from his high school days needs Magnum's help to track down a stolen dolphin.
110	4	"The Kona Winds"	Jerry Jameson	Chris Abbott-Fish	October 10, 1985
As a Kona storm front bears down on Hawaii, Magnum rescues Lauren Henderson (Cynthia Sikes), a woman who fears for her life after witnessing her husband, Sam (Frank Converse), murder his business partner. Meanwhile, Higgins tries to defend the Robin's Nest against nature's wrath.
111	5	"The Hotel Dick"	Douglas Heyes	Reuben Leder	October 17, 1985
Leslie "Scooter" Emory (Candy Clark), an eavesdropping prostitute and a cat burglar make trouble for hotel detective Magnum, who finds his boss, Clyde Daltrey (Granville Van Dusen) all too Higgins-like and is tasked with apprehending an elusive thief before an upcoming jewelry convention to be held at the hotel.
112	6	"Round and Around"	Reuben Leder	Reuben Leder	October 24, 1985
Ron Pennington (Bob Minor), a friend of T.C. and Magnum, is shot dead when interrupting an armed grocery store hold-up, and they discover his son, Ron Jr. (Larry B. Scott) is linked to the murder.
113	7	"Going Home"	Harry Harris	Story by : Gene Donalds; Teleplay by : Chris Abbott-Fish	October 31, 1985
After thirteen years away, Magnum returns to his hometown of Tidewater, Virginia to attend the funeral of his grandfather, Everett, and reopens a long-running family feud when he suspects his stepfather Frank Peterson (David Huddleston) of stealing and selling a missing family heirloom — a letter from Abraham Lincoln. Note: John Hillerman, Roger E. Mosley and Larry Manetti do not appear in this episode.
114	8	"Paniolo"	Russ Mayberry	Jay Huguely	November 7, 1985
Kenny Harbinson (Michael Sharrett) presents himself a wealthy teenage ranch owner wanting to hire Magnum to stop a dangerous group of cattle rustlers on Hawaii's big island. Magnum is on to the ruse. The owner of the neighboring ranch, believed to be involved in the rustling, is a business partner of Robin Masters.
115	9	"The Treasure of Kalaniopu'u"	Ivan Dixon	Reuben Leder	November 14, 1985
Magnum and a group of his treasure hunting friends are held at gunpoint on a cliff top with the one million dollar prize that was the hidden object of a treasure hunt competition, organized to help promote Robin Masters' new novel by using clues from it.
116	10	"Blood and Honor"	Mike Vejar	Phil Combest	December 5, 1985
Magnum is called back to service by Admiral Hawkes (Paul Burke), who has reason to suspect that someone at his base is leaking coded information, and Magnum's prime suspect is Alex McPort (Simone Griffeth), the fiancée of Hawkes' son, Andy (Jeff Yagher).
117	11	"Rapture"	Russ Mayberry	Bruce Cervi	December 12, 1985
As he and T.C. deep sea scuba dive, Magnum sees a young boy who appears out of nowhere with no breathing apparatus and signals him to follow. Determined to prove that the boy was real, he learns that his vision matches the description of a young boy killed five years earlier in an explosion at sea.
118	12	"I Never Wanted to Go to France, Anyway"	Arthur Allan Seidelman	Reuben Leder	January 2, 1986
Inky (Clive Revill), an old comrade of Higgins' brings his traveling carnival to Hawaii. But when one of the performers is fatally stabbed, Higgins asks Magnum to investigate. Working undercover as a carnival 'roustabout', aided by Rick, Magnum learns that even before the killing, the carnival had been experiencing a string of 'accidents', and must pin-point exactly who is trying to force the show out of business.
119	13	"Summer School"	Russ Mayberry	Bruce Cervi	January 9, 1986
After being expelled from a number of expensive schools, R.J. (Tate Donovan), Robin's rich, careless, 20-year old nephew, arrives at the estate to be reformed and educated by Higgins. R.J., however, has other ideas and decides to impersonate Magnum after being impressed by his adventures.
120	14	"Mad Dogs and Englishmen"	Virgil W. Vogel	Jay Huguely	January 23, 1986
Magnum investigates why Higgins has left the estate in disgrace, refusing to believe he's embezzled from Robin Masters, and is more than a little taken aback by his replacement, Ginny Malcolm (Darleen Carr), a rather dizzy actress.
121	15	"All Thieves on Deck"	Jerry Jameson	Reuben Leder	January 30, 1986
With an attempt already having been made to steal it from the estate, Magnum is to spend a week aboard a luxury cruise ship guarding an aumakua, a valuable wooden Hawaiian statuette recently purchased by Robin Masters, to be displayed on the liner while en route to the Hilo Museum.
122	16	"This Island Isn't Big Enough...."	Leo Penn	Story by : Chris Abbott-Fish & Reuben Leder; Teleplay by : Chris Abbott-Fish	February 13, 1986
When Rick's boat returns from a cruise deserted, Magnum searches for the answers to what has happened to his friend and the passengers on board, all now presumed dead.
123	17	"Way of the Stalking Horse"	John Llewellyn Moxey	Bruce Cervi	February 20, 1986
Magnum unwittingly leads a hitman (Morgan Stevens)—who hired him under the pretense of looking for his father (Clu Gulager)—to his victim.
124	18	"Find Me a Rainbow"	Rick Weaver	Jill Sherman Donner	March 13, 1986
Lydia McCarthy (Julia Montgomery), a wealthy young woman, hires Magnum to find her family's former chauffeur, claiming that he stole some jewelry from her, but she's really after her son. Meanwhile, much to Higgins' dismay, a group of underprivileged boys on a camp program stays at the Robin's Nest.
125	19	"Who Is Don Luis Higgins... ...and Why Is He Doing These Terrible Things to Me?"	John Llewellyn Moxey	Jay Huguely	March 20, 1986
Another of Higgins' half-brothers arrives (John Hillerman in a dual role), this one the last in the royal line of Costa Del Rosa and who ends up a suspect in a plot to assassinate the country's president at a chess tournament. Note: Roger E. Mosley does not appear in this episode.
126	20	"A Little Bit of Luck... A Little Bit of Grief"	Ray Austin	Reuben Leder	April 3, 1986
Magnum and T.C. end up in jail after trying to save T.C.'s underprivileged kids' club from a greedy land developer. Rick returns from a trip to the mainland with one million dollars in lottery winnings and a new fiancée named Jeannine (Claudia Cron).
127	21	"Photo Play"	Burt Brinckerhoff	Story by : Chas. Floyd Johnson; Teleplay by : Bruce Cervi	April 10, 1986
Photographer Sally Faraday (Cassie Yates), looking to hire Magnum, meets him in undesirable circumstances. During a car chase, Sally's pursuers, two men in a brown sedan, smash into the front of the Ferrari leaving Agatha Chumley with a broken ankle.

=== Season 7 (1986–87) ===
No. overall	No. in season	Title	Directed by	Written by	Original release date
128	1	"L.A."	Alan J. Levi	Chris Abbott-Fish	October 1, 1986
129	2	"L.A."	Alan J. Levi	Chris Abbott-Fish	October 1, 1986
Magnum heads to Los Angeles to deliver lawsuit papers to a small film company on behalf of Robin Masters, and during the trip befriends a stand-up comedian. But when he finds her murdered in his hotel room, he investigates to find who is behind the killing. When he goes to deliver the subpoena to the film company, he strikes up a relationship with the attractive young attorney Cynthia Farrell (Dana Delany), and the pair work together to find the murderers. Meanwhile, back in Hawaii, one of the players on T.C.'s baseball team is mixed up with some small-time car thieves, and witnesses his friends being shot dead after stealing a car. Magnum and Cynthia become ever closer to each other as they investigate Marti's murder. Their search leads them to a drug trafficker, but their snooping around sees them almost killed. Back in Hawaii, T.C., with help from Rick and Higgins, continues to search for the missing Kenny (Alfonso Ribeiro), and get him out of the trouble he is in.
130	3	"One Picture Is Worth"	Ray Austin	James L. Novak	October 8, 1986
Linda Andrews (Stephanie Dunnam), a gifted deaf painter, is the only eyewitness to a bank robbery in which four people were killed. Carol persuades Magnum to secure the young woman at Robin's Nest and act as her bodyguard when her life is endangered after identifying one of the perpetrators in a police lineup.
131	4	"Straight and Narrow"	Harry Harris	Reuben Leder	October 15, 1986
Magnum's luck takes a tumble when he injures his ankle while training for an upcoming charity sports event. If unhealed in time, his place will be taken for the race. But his luck looks like a sure fail when he finds that call girl Leslie "Scooter" Emory (Candy Clark), whom he met when he was working as a hotel detective (in S06E05), has taken a job as a waitress at the King Kamehameha Club, and wants to hire him in locating her missing sister, Patty (Cindy Fisher). Although she is well-meaning, Leslie has proven to cause Magnum chaos; it is found that Patty is involved with powerful political figures.
132	5	"A.A.P.I."	Russ Mayberry	Reuben Leder	October 22, 1986
At the 14th Annual Convention of Private Investigators, Magnum is to receive the 'Local P.I. of the Year' award, but the event is brought to a halt when Jean Claude Fornier (Paul Verdier), the famous French detective, suddenly drops dead while giving a speech, after being poisoned. Magnum is "helped" by several fellow crime-busting acquaintances as he seeks the murderer, and becomes entangled with a gang of drug smugglers.
133	6	"Death and Taxes"	Alan J. Levi	Bruce Cervi	October 29, 1986
While the others are away, Magnum begins the hated task of filling out his tax forms for an audit but is interrupted by a phone call from a serial killer with a nursery rhyme for him. The man then hints that he knew about Philippe (from "Don't Eat the Snow in Hawaii"). When a prostitute and former client of Magnum's is found dead, Magnum ties together the murder with the nursery rhyme. After several more phone calls and another murder, Magnum confronts and kills the murderer, who turns out to be Milton Collins (Kenneth Tigar), a former client. Magnum concludes that Collins "died with all the secrets", as Magnum never found out how Collins knew about Philippe. Note: For the first time in the series, a song from popular culture: "Mama", by Genesis is featured.
134	7	"Little Girl Who"	Ray Austin	Deborah M. Pratt	November 5, 1986
Magnum's ex-wife Michelle (Marta DuBois, from "Memories Are Forever") leaves her five-year-old daughter Lily to be safeguarded by Thomas, as she escapes Vietnamese assassins out to kill her and her husband, General Hue (Soon-Tek Oh). As Thomas watches over the child, he begins to wonder why Michelle has suddenly left Lily with him and if Lily is his own daughter, and once again sets about trying to track down his elusive former wife.
135	8	"Paper War"	Tony Wharmby	Jay Huguely	November 12, 1986
When Higgins unwittingly causes Magnum to wipe an expensive computer game loaned from T.C., and Thomas accidentally erases a chunk of Higgins' memoirs stored on the computer, a feud breaks out between the pair. Magnum is trying to break a major, crooked gambling ring that is operating on the islands, but it is none too easy while in the middle of the falling out with Higgins, which starts out with each trying to out-do the other with "eye for an eye" practical jokes, and quickly develops into a particularly bitter battle of wills. The episode ends with Magnum accusing Higgins of being Robin Masters.
136	9	"Novel Connection"	Harry Harris	Jay Huguely	November 19, 1986
Jessica Fletcher (Angela Lansbury), on vacation in Hawaii, offers to help Magnum, who has been accused of killing a hitman with an unknown target, and continues in his corner when another murder occurs. Jessica Walter and Dorothy Loudon also guest star. Note: This episode begins a crossover event that concludes on Murder, She Wrote season 3 episode 8.
137	10	"Kapu"	Ivan Dixon	Deborah Dean Davis	November 26, 1986
When Magnum is on a case, he saves a Hawaiian native girl after she witnesses a murder. When he is shot himself, Magnum is taken to a forbidden native island and must solve the loose ends and get back to civilization.
138	11	"Missing Melody"	Harvey Laidman	Roger E. Mosley & Cal Wilson	December 3, 1986
T.C.'s children, Melody (Martina Stringer) and Bryant (Shavar Ross), come to visit him in Hawaii, but at the airport Melody goes missing. It transpires that the young girl has been kidnapped and is being held for $300,000 ransom. Magnum, Rick, and Higgins help in the rush to either raise the ransom money in time or deduce and find whoever snatched Melody. The kidnapping puts a strain on T.C.'s relationship with his son Bryant, as well as his ex-wife Tina (Fay Hauser), who quickly comes to Hawaii with her new boyfriend (Albert Popwell) as soon as she hears of the kidnapping of her daughter.
139	12	"Death of the Flowers"	Jerry Jameson	Maryann Kasica & Michael Scheff	December 10, 1986
While Rick is planning a surprise birthday bash at the King Kamehameha Club for Icepick (Elisha Cook), Carol asks Magnum to observe a court case she is presenting before Judge Hannibal Kearns (Michael Constantine), who drops the case on a simple technicality. She considers the Judge to be her mentor but is concerned that of late he has been acting uncharacteristically and suspects him of taking bribes to dismiss cases. She asks Magnum to help her hopefully disprove her worries. But the investigation turns up evidence that implicates Icepick, who in turn faces having to implicate the woman he was in love with decades earlier. Carol, Rick, and Icepick are forced to face up to the weaknesses and mortality of people close to them.
140	13	"Autumn Warrior"	Tony Wharmby	Jay Huguely	December 17, 1986
Higgins goes on a survivalist trip on an island with a small group of young offenders as part of a program aimed at improving their self-esteem. But he has to call upon his survival skills much more than expected when a planned escape by the boys does not go as intended and sees the leader of the trip shot dead, leaving Higgins being hunted down on the island by the three young convicts. Back on the estate, Magnum, with Rick and T.C., plans to take advantage of Higgins' absence by holding a big party, but the get-together seems ill-fated from the start.
141	14	"Murder by Night"	Russ Mayberry	Robert Hamilton	January 14, 1987
In 1940s San Francisco, private investigator Thomas S. Magnum investigates the murder of newspaper tycoon William T. Maxfield (Bill Edwards). The case involves characters who also bear strong resemblances to the "modern day" T.C., Higgins, and Rick.
142	15	"On the Fly"	Bernard L. Kowalski	Jay Huguely	January 21, 1987
T.C. is giving Magnum helicopter flying lessons when he is shot. With T.C. hospitalized, Mac appears on the scene, "volunteering" his services in running Island Hoppers. But it seems that the assailants were actually gunning for Magnum after somebody impersonated him a week previously when trying to blackmail Pasqual Valez (Byrne Piven), a Mexican Mafia kingpin. With Magnum marked as a dead man as a result of the mistaken identity, confusion and chaos reigns, and, as per usual, Mac just happens to be in the middle of it all.
143	16	"Solo Flight"	John C. Flinn III	Jay Huguely	February 4, 1987
During a hike in the mountains to clear his head, Magnum becomes trapped under the wreckage of an old fighter plane and must stay alive, while also thinking about a case he was recently fired from and reminiscing about his life in general. Note: The aircraft he finds is not a P-40.
144	17	"Forty"	Russ Mayberry	Bruce Cervi	February 11, 1987
Magnum's 40th birthday begins with the loss of his lucky two-dollar bill during a night on the town on Hotel Street. He then finds himself in love with a beautiful TV news reporter, Linda Lee Ellison (Patrice Martinez), who turns out to be involved with a case Magnum is working on.
145	18	"Laura"	Alan J. Levi	Chris Abbott-Fish	February 25, 1987
Magnum is hired by a retired NYPD Det. Sgt. named Michael Doheny (Frank Sinatra, in his last credited screen acting performance) to find the killers in an unsolved Bronx homicide, who are now living in Honolulu. It turns out that the little girl that was raped and murdered by the men Doheny was after, was in fact Doheny's granddaughter, Laura. Magnum helps the detective find the killers and bring them to justice, with the help of Rick and Lt. Nolan Paige (Joe Santos). Note: The episode featured the Genesis song, "Tonight, Tonight, Tonight" during the hotel street scene.
146	19	"Out of Sync"	Joan Darling	Jay Huguely	March 11, 1987
Cynthia Farrell comes to Hawaii to see Magnum, and to see if the two can recapture the magic of their relationship in L.A., but when Magnum is hired by adult film star Andrea Nicholson (Lisa Blount), he spends more time looking after his case than he does Cynthia.
147	20	"The Aunt Who Came to Dinner"	Russ Mayberry	Chris Abbott-Fish	March 18, 1987
Magnum's beloved aunt, New York playwright Phoebe Sullivan (Barbara Rush), visits with the intent of producing a play in Hawaii. When he finds that someone is trying to kill her, Magnum must do everything in his power to protect his aunt.
148	21	"The People vs. Orville Wright"	Burt Brinckerhoff	Bruce Cervi	April 1, 1987
Rick insists that Magnum search for Icepick when he suddenly vanishes, seemingly pulling a disappearing act to avoid some information that could land him in very hot water. But when Rick is arrested for allegedly killing a hitman that was contracted to murder Icepick, Thomas finds himself in the midst of an even more tangled investigation, especially when Rick does not deny any of the charges and gives a full confession.
149	22	"Limbo"	Jackie Cooper	Story by : Tom Selleck & Chas. Floyd Johnson; Teleplay by : Jay Huguely & Bruce Cervi & Chris Abbott-Fish	April 15, 1987
In what was originally meant to be the final episode of the series, Magnum is critically wounded in a dockside warehouse firefight and ends up in a coma. He "wakes up" in Limbo with Mac but refuses to believe that he is dead, insisting that he is only dreaming, even though no one but Mac can hear or see him. Magnum finally accepts that he is dead, and says his goodbyes. Note: Throughout the episode, John Denver's song "Looking for Space" plays in its entirety and ends as Magnum walks off into the clouds.

=== Season 8 (1987–88) ===
The episodes "Tigers Fan" and "A Girl Named Sue" were the two most-watched episodes of this season, garnering the highest ratings both during their initial broadcasts and during their subsequent reruns.

No. overall	No. in season	Title	Directed by	Written by	Original release date
150	1	"Infinity and Jelly Doughnuts"	John C. Flinn III	Chris Abbott	October 7, 1987
Magnum wakes up from his coma after suffering his near death experience, but is troubled by loose ends and the possibility that one of his shooters is still at large and could possibly kill Michelle and his daughter Lily.
151	2	"Pleasure Principle"	Corey Allen	Jay Huguely	October 14, 1987
Still healing from his near-death ordeal and experiencing Mac's ghost, Magnum is surprised when Higgins hands over his estate duties to be able to take some time off. In a bizarre twist, Higgins starts living the fast and loose life, wears loud Hawaiian shirts and becomes irresponsible, while Thomas assumes Higgins' stuffy personality and ways, going so far as to wear a suit. Curious about Higgins's sudden change in personality, Thomas investigates and discovers that Higgins is seeing a woman named Rosita Esteverdes (Julia Migenes) on the sly, and becomes concerned that she is taking Higgins for a ride, while the woman is being stalked by Miguel Torres (Gregory Sierra), a mysterious man. Note: This episode features a Miami Sound Machine song, "Conga"
152	3	"Innocence... A Broad"	Harry Harris	Steven A. Miller	October 28, 1987
Robin Masters is sued by a man who tripped at a recent party on the estate. As Magnum begins to investigate the man, who seems to be a professional at making false claims, Joe Hatten (Kenneth McMillan), a loud-mouthed businessman, unexpectedly pays him to take Rita Parker (Janis Ward), his perky fiancee, along on the case with him. Note: This episode is dedicated to the memory of music composer Pete Carpenter, who died the day after "Pleasure Principle" premiered.
153	4	"Tigers Fan"	Harry Harris	Bruce Cervi	November 4, 1987
When Lt. Tanaka is murdered while participating in a drug deal, it is up to Magnum to find his killer and prove his friend's innocence in the process.
154	5	"Forever in Time"	Jackie Cooper	Kimmer Ringwald	November 11, 1987
Magnum is running an errand to a local museum for Higgins' upcoming pageant for the Anglo-Hawaiian Historical Society, when he catches sight of a woman attending a funeral who, he soon learns, resembles a beautiful Hawaiian princess who died in a fire in 1910. Magnum becomes enamoured with the elusive beauty, and experiences visions of himself, in 1900s naval uniform, with the woman. The mystery grows even more when he receives a package in the mail containing a similar naval uniform, and a locket holding photographs of what looks like himself and the princess.
155	6	"The Love That Lies"	Ray Danton	Jeri Taylor	November 18, 1987
Magnum is trying to protect Carol, who is in the middle of a particularly controversial court case, when he is hired by Brenda Babcock (Eileen Brennan), a woman from the mainland, to help locate the birth certificate for the child she gave up for adoption 30 years ago. In doing so he becomes embroiled in Carol's personal life, as he discovers a powerful secret about her mother Abigail (Celeste Holm) and father and her true birthright that could shatter her.
156	7	"A Girl Named Sue"	Russ Mayberry	Steven A. Miller	January 13, 1988
Magnum is hired by the attractive Melissa Wainwright (Shelley Smith), to find the missing will of her late father, William (George Coe), who was recently killed in a suspicious boating accident, which she suspects her brother Arthur (John Calvin) of being behind, in order to steal the will. Working on the case, Thomas finds that former client Susan Johnson (Carol Burnett) - with whom he was once locked in a bank vault - is now a fellow private investigator, and is working on the same case - for the brother, who suspects his sister as responsible for their father's death. The two P.I.s are soon locked in a battle of wills as they both race to solve the investigation first, but the pair are forced to put their love-hate relationship to one side and team up to solve the case of sibling rivalry.
157	8	"Unfinished Business"	Russ Mayberry	Chris Abbott & Jeri Taylor	January 20, 1988
When Quang Ki (Richard Narita), who attempted to kill him and Michelle, is set free on a technicality, Magnum tries to gain information about the whereabouts of Michelle and Lily from Buck, who refuses to help. When Magnum receives a videotape of the murder of Michelle and Lily, he vows revenge and arms himself with a sniper rifle and commando gear. But when he learns that Ki will be exchanged for an American POW released from Vietnam after more than twenty years in captivity, Magnum reluctantly forgoes killing Ki for the sake of preserving good relations between the U.S. and Vietnam in order to free more POWs. Note: Like "Death and Taxes" and "Laura", this episode features a Genesis song, "The Brazilian".
158	9	"The Great Hawaiian Adventure Company"	Ray Danton	Jeri Taylor	January 27, 1988
Magnum is trying to get Rick, T.C. and Higgins interested in joining him in a potentially lucrative new tourist business venture. But his friends all have other things on their minds, especially T.C., who puts thoughts of the deal on the back burner when his son Bryant (Shavar Ross) lands in trouble with the police after becoming mixed up with a juvenile biker gang led by Budge (Danny Nucci). Meanwhile, Magnum tries to make headway with his new business venture by wooing Sarah Amlin (Shanna Reed), an attractive airline CEO. Rick is romantically sprung by Cleo Mitchell (Phyllis Davis), a former hooker and client of Magnum's. Higgins' memoir manuscript is rejected by a publisher.
159	10	"Legend of the Lost Art"	Burt Brinckerhoff	Jay Huguely	February 10, 1988
Higgins wants Magnum to find the "Lost Art of the Ancients", a priceless scroll from a fallen civilization, that could spell disaster should it fall into the wrong hands. But the search for the long-lost artifact is laced with abduction, danger and deceit, as Connie Northrop (Margaret Colin), an old flame of Magnum's, Malcolm (Kabir Bedi), a foreign double agent, and Peter Riddley-Smythe (Anthony Newley), a ruthless rival of Higgins', are all out to find the scroll as well, and the dangerous path to unearthing it could ultimately lead to death.
160	11	"Transitions"	Harry Harris	Chris Abbott	February 17, 1988
When Higgins asks his help in finding Robin's latest manuscript after it is stolen, Magnum gets some unexpected help in the case when St. Louis gumshoe Luther H. Gillis (Eugene Roche) arrives unannounced on vacation. They set about trying to work out who is so desperate to get hold of the manuscript that they are willing to resort to attempting to kill Higgins and drugging Zeus and Apollo to get it, in scenes reminiscent of those portrayed in the stolen book.
161	12	"Resolutions"	Burt Brinckerhoff	Stephen A. Miller & Chris Abbott	May 1, 1988
162	13	"Resolutions"	Burt Brinckerhoff	Stephen A. Miller & Chris Abbott	May 1, 1988
Magnum ponders his future while paying a visit to his family in Tidewater, Virginia, where he unexpectedly meets his namesake grandfather (Howard Duff) and considers an offer to be reinstated to the Navy. Thomas returns to Hawaii to ascertain whether former girlfriend Linda Lee Ellison (Patrice Martinez) is being stalked, while Rick prepares for his wedding to Cleo. As Thomas and Linda renew their relationship while he searches for her stalker, Magnum becomes increasingly certain that his daughter Lily may still be alive. As Rick's wedding looms ever closer, Magnum continues his surveillance on Linda to try and catch the psychopathic killer who is stalking her. T.C. faces a reconciliation with his estranged wife. Magnum gets some surprising news about his theory that Higgins is really Robin Masters, when Higgins finally admits that he is indeed Robin. Discovering that his daughter Lily is alive and that her fate is in his hands, Magnum decides to return to active duty in the Navy at the rank of Commander to protect her from General Hue's enemies. During Rick's wedding, Higgins recants his admission to Magnum that he is Robin Masters. The series ends with Magnum, in his Navy dress whites, and Lily walking down the beach together hand in hand. After the end credits and producer's sounder, the scene cuts to Magnum seated, dressed in his attire and viewing a TV in the Masters mansion. Magnum turns, looks at the camera and clicks the remote control after saying "Good night." The screen then goes black, ending the series' original run.
