= Patrice Martinez =

American actress (1963–2018)

- Born: June 12, 1963; Albuquerque, New Mexico, U.S.
- Died: December 24, 2018 (aged 55); Burbank, California, U.S.
- Other names: Patrice Camhi, Patricia Martinez
- Occupation: Actress
- Years active: 1986–1999
- Spouse: Daniel Camhi (m. 1987; div. 1992)

Patrice Martinez (June 12, 1963 – December 24, 2018) was an American actress. She received her theatrical education in London, played the role of Carmen in the film Three Amigos, and starred in the early 1990s television series Zorro.

== Life and career ==
Martinez was born in Albuquerque, New Mexico. As a child, she performed in a local theater. She started her screen career as a teenager, working as an extra in the film Convoy, directed by Sam Peckinpah. After high school, when she was 18, she moved from Albuquerque to study at the Royal Academy of Dramatic Art (RADA) in London.

She returned to the United States and soon moved to Los Angeles, California, where she gained her first film experience in A Walk on the Moon. She appeared in Three Amigos in 1986 and later accepted a role on Magnum, P.I. with Tom Selleck, portraying Linda Lee Ellison in season 7 ("Forty") and season 8 (the series conclusion, "Resolutions", episodes 12 & 13). After that, she portrayed Victoria Escalante in Zorro and appeared in Beetlejuice (as the character Miss Argentina), The Effects of Magic (as the character Beatrice),.

Martinez has two sisters, Benita Andre and Maria Abre. Benita was also cast in Three Amigos.

From 1987-1992, Martinez was married to producer-director Daniel Camhi, and was credited as "Patrice Camhi" in the first two seasons of Zorro. Martinez and Camhi divorced, so she appeared as Patrice Martinez from Season 3 onward.

== Death ==
Martinez died on December 24, 2018, at her home in Burbank, California, after a long illness.

== Filmography ==
Year	Title	Role	Notes
1978	Convoy	Maria	
1986	Miami Vice	Maria Escobar	Season 3 Episode 9: "Baby Blues"
1986	Three Amigos	Carmen	
1987	A Walk on the Moon	India	
1987	Gunsmoke: Return to Dodge	Bright Water	
1987–1988	Magnum, P.I.	Linda Lee Ellison	(1) Season 7 Episode 16: "Forty" (1987) (2) Season 8 Episode 12: "Resolutions: Part I" (1988) (3) Season 8 Episode 13: "Resolutions: Part II" (1988)
1988	Beetlejuice	Miss Argentina, Receptionist	
1988	Dirty Rotten Scoundrels	Girl on Train	uncredited
1990–1993	Zorro	Victoria Escalante	89 episodes
1994	Phantom 2040	Esteban Aguilar	Season 1 Episode 12: "The Gauntlet" (voice role)
1998	Winnetous Rückkehr	Kish-Kao-Ko	Two-part TV miniseries
1998	The Effects of Magic	Beatrice	
1999	Air America	Mandy	Season 1 Episode 20: "Heartbreak Hotel"
