= Jackie Young (politician) =

American politician and activist (1934–2019)

Member of the Hawaii House of Representatives from the 51st district 20th (1990–1992)
- In office 1990–1994
- Preceded by: Cam Cavasso
- Succeeded by: Eve G. Anderson

Personal details
- Born: May 20, 1934 Honolulu, Hawaii Territory
- Died: February 10, 2019 (aged 84) Honolulu, Hawaii, U.S.
- Party: Democratic
- Education: University of Hawaiʻi; Old Dominion University; Union Institute & University

Jacqueline Eurn Hai Young (May 20, 1934 – February 10, 2019) was an American politician and activist.

Young was born in Honolulu, Hawaii Territory and graduated from Punahou School in 1952. She was of Korean descent.

Young received her bachelor's degree from University of Hawaiʻi in 1969; her master's degree from Old Dominion University, in 1982, and her doctorate degree from Union Institute & University, in 1989.

== Public office ==
Young was first elected to the Hawaii House of Representatives's 20th District in 1990 as a Democrat, with 54.02% of the vote to 45.98% for Republican nominee Eve Glover Anderson (incumbent Campbell Cavasso, initially a candidate, did not run). She was re-elected in 1992 from what was now the 51st district, defeating Anderson with 59.76% of the vote to Anderson's 40.24%. In January 1993, she was elected Vice-Speaker of the State House. In 1994, instead of seeking re-election, she sought the Democratic nomination for Lieutenant Governor, losing to fellow Representative Mazie Hirono, who pulled 65.24% of the vote; Young's 26.29% was second, in a six-way race. (Her House seat was taken by Anderson.)

She was the unsuccessful Democratic nominee for Hawaii State Senate's 25th District in 1996 (losing by 187 votes to Republican incumbent Whitney T. Anderson), and again in 2002.

She was appointed to the Hawaii Judicial Selection Commission in 2013 by Senate President Donna Mercado Kim, and served four years as Vice-Chair. In 2017 she was re-appointed by Governor David Ige, and served a two-year term as Chairwoman.

== After office ==
Young was involved with the Hawaii American Civil Liberties Union. Young died at St. Francis Hospice, in Honolulu, Hawaii, after suffering a severe stroke. She is survived by four children and three grandchildren.
