= My Friend Tony =

- Genre: Crime drama
- Created by: Ivan Goff; Ben Roberts; Warren Duff
- Starring: James Whitmore; Enzo Cerusico
- Theme music composer: Earle Hagen
- Composers: Earle Hagen; Richard Shores; Hugo Friedhofer; Carl Brandt
- Country of origin: United States
- Original language: English
- No. of seasons: 1
- No. of episodes: 16

Production
- Executive producer: Sheldon Leonard
- Producers: Art Seid; Ernest Frankel
- Running time: 45–48 minutes
- Production companies: Sheldon Leonard Productions, in association with NBC (filmed at Paramount Studios)

Original release
- Network: NBC
- Release: January 5 – September 28, 1969

Related
- The Danny Thomas Hour

My Friend Tony is an American crime drama that aired on NBC starting on January 5, 1969. The last rerun episode aired on September 28, 1969. The pilot was broadcast as an episode of the anthology series The Danny Thomas Hour on March 4, 1968.

== Synopsis ==
The series features Enzo Cerusico as the title character, Tony Novello, and James Whitmore as John Woodruff, a professor of criminology who served in Italy during World War II. As a child, Novello had been a street urchin who survived as a pickpocket, with Woodruff being one of his intended victims. Woodruff kept in touch with Tony, who later became one of his students.

The premise of the series was that the adult (and reformed, if still rough-around-the-edges) Novello had emigrated to the United States and became a member of Professor Woodruff's criminology class. As a result of Woodruff's reputation for crime-solving and his extensive contacts within the world of police investigation, the Professor would often be consulted on current criminal cases, and he would draw on his current criminology students to give him practical assistance in unraveling his latest mystery (and to give the students some practical experience in their chosen field). Novello would usually handle the legwork and physical side of the investigations while Woodruff, in his role as a professor of criminology, conducted painstaking laboratory analysis of the most obscure clues.

From time to time, and depending on the requirements of the case, up to half-a-dozen other students were also called upon to help with investigations, whether by analyzing clues in Woodruff's university office/lab or (more rarely) looking for clues out in the field. Seen in recurring roles as these other students were: Mary Frann (then using the stage name "Jennifer Douglas") as Kathy Grey; Dan Ferrone as Jeff Pryor; Harvey Jason as David Gresham, Larry Pennell as Nat Foley; Paul Verdier as Emile Bournet; and Aly Wassil as Rama Chillunkar. Also seen in several episodes was Richard Anderson as Chief of Police Richard Orr, a friend of Woodruff's who called him in to consult on cases, even though he knew that it also meant involving Novello—whom he found irritating.

My Friend Tony was an early story editing credit for James L. Brooks, who would jump from this series straight to Room 222, then one year later, The Mary Tyler Moore Show. The tone of the show mixed in elements of comedy (especially with Novello's youthful impatience, amiable brashness and unfamiliarity with some American customs) alongside the serious, near-forensic investigative procedure.

NBC slotted My Friend Tony in the 10 p.m. Eastern timeslot on Sundays, following Bonanza. The network ended production of the series after 16 episodes but continued airing reruns of the show through that summer. The program aired for the last time on September 30, 1969.

== Reception ==
Despite having the highly successful Bonanza as its lead-in, Sheldon Leonard — who developed My Friend Tony and was its executive producer — attributed the program's low ratings to its timeslot.

"First, the 10-to-11 P.M. time spot didn't take full advantage of Enzo's youthful audience, as shown by his flood of fan mail, which exceeds anything in our experience," Leonard told TV Guide. "Second, because of the one-hour length and the network's commitment to 27 new projects all demanding air time, there was no 8 or 9 o'clock spot into which to move it,"

Some critics gave a poor review to My Friend Tony, calling the series "hackneyed and confusing" ... "the kind of minimal fare that has been ground out ad nauseam" ... "mundane" and "bilge."

Others found the series enjoyable. One reviewer praised the acting of the two stars, plus the low amount of violence shown onscreen, during a time when many groups were concerned about TV violence. Another mentioned the "pleasantly convoluted plots."

Newspaper columnist Clarke Williamson reported that viewers liked the series, but found it difficult to watch regularly since it was often preempted. (After the first five episodes aired weekly, the series was preempted nine times over the next 14 weeks.)

== Episodes ==
No.	Title	Directed by	Written by	Original release date
0	"My Pal Tony"	Unknown	Unknown	March 4, 1968
Series pilot (with slightly different title), aired as an episode of The Danny Thomas Hour. With James Whitmore, Enzo Cerusico, Dorothy Provine, Hal March, Rose Marie, and Walter Pidgeon.
1	"Corey Doesn't Live Here Anymore"	Arthur Marks	Jerrold L. Ludwig	January 5, 1969
City officials ask Professor Woodruff and Tony to set up a detective lab to fight crime using modern methods.
2	"Death Comes in Small Packages"	Unknown	Jerry Thomas	January 12, 1969
A stolen attache case contains a vial of germs that could kill millions. Woodruff and Tony must find it before the thieves realize what they have.
3	"Voices"	Christian Nyby	Jerry Chodorov and Kay Green	January 19, 1969
Woodruff's old friend (played by Julie Adams) becomes suicidal over the pressures of running a high-fashion career and stolen clothing designs.
4	"Let George Do It"	Harvey Hart	Robert Hamner	January 26, 1969
When Woodruff and Tony are hired to investigate an accidental death they are targeted as the next "accident" victims.
5	"The Lost Hours"	Arthur Marks	Jackson Gillis	February 2, 1969
An important scientist's career could be ruined by scandal if Woodruff and Tony can't clear his name.
6	"The Hazing"	Unknown	Unknown	February 16, 1969
Woodruff and Tony investigate the disappearance of a foreign exchange student. Harrison Ford has a guest role.
7	"Encounter"	Lewis Allen	James L. Brooks	February 23, 1969
Woodruff helps an old friend (played by Geraldine Brooks) who is accused of murdering her husband.
8	"Dead Reckoning"	Unknown	Unknown	March 9, 1969
The practices of spiritualists are investigated, and Tony becomes a believer in their abilities.
9	"Wedding Cake Blues"	Unknown	Unknown	March 23, 1969
A wealthy socialite (played by Rose Marie) hires Woodruff and Tony to find out who is threatening her fiancé.
10	"The Twenty Mile Jog"	Unknown	Unknown	April 13, 1969
Pat O'Brien plays a former political boss who hires Woodruff and Tony to help his son (played by Dwayne Hickman) who has a police record and has once again gotten into trouble.
11	"Molly"	Unknown	Unknown	May 18, 1969
A street vendor's fruit stand is destroyed by fire, but the arson investigation turns into a homicide case.
12	"Computer Murder"	Richard Wechsler	Michael Zagor	May 25, 1969
Woodruff and Tony search for an acid-throwing woman who blinded 3 bachelors who had used a computer dating service. Sheree North had a guest role.
13	"Casino"	Unknown	Unknown	June 1, 1969
The prime minister of a South American country hires Professor Woodruff because he believes crooked gamblers are ruining casino profits. (Episode listed as being postponed from March 2nd.)
14	"Kidnap"	Harvey Hart	Jackson Gillis	June 8, 1969
Woodruff and Tony search for a girl kidnapped soon after her grandparents won $70,000 in a lottery.
15	"The Shortest Courtship"	Earl Bellamy	James L. Brooks	June 15, 1969
Tony becomes a reluctant bridegroom when he's blackmailed into helping international smugglers. William Windom has a guest role.
16	"Welcome Home, Jerry Stanley"	Christian Nyby	Ernest Frankel	June 22, 1969
Monte Markham plays a parole released from prison who is determined to prove his innocence. His family hires Woodruff and Tony to investigate.

== Original TV tie-in novel ==
In 1969, Lancer Books published an original novel by William Johnston, named for the series. Because it was meant to be available shortly after the show's January, 1969 debut, Johnston had to write it without having seen an episode, basing his interpretation on pre-air materials (which may have included some combination of a press kit, a show bible, a sample script and/or production photos). Subsequently, the novel is a fair approximation of the TV series, but lacks any reference to the WWII backstory that brought John Woodruff and Tony Novello together as well as Tony's Italian accent.
