= Eve G. Anderson =

American politician

Eve Anderson

Member of the Hawaii House of Representatives from the 51st district
- In office 1994–1996
- Preceded by: Jackie Young
- Succeeded by: Kenny Goodenow

Personal details
- Born: c. 1938
- Party: Republican
- Education: Mills College

Eve Glover Anderson is an heiress, sportswoman and former Republican member of the Hawaii House of Representatives from Waimanalo, Hawaii. Her father, James W. Glover, a builder, was a member of the legislature of the Territory of Hawaii. Her mother, Eva (Grossman) Glover, died in January 1951; and her stepmother was Barbara Cox Anthony, daughter and heiress of James M. Cox (former Governor of Ohio) and the richest person in Hawaii. Anderson inherited the family estate, Pahonu, which was used for the filming of the television series Magnum, P.I..

== Background ==
She is a member of the class of 1956 at Punahou School, and a 1961 graduate of Mills College.

== Elections ==
In 1990, Anderson ran for the 20th District of the Hawaii House of Representatives. Incumbent Campbell Cavasso (also a Republican) was initially reported as running, but Anderson did not face a primary election. She lost in the general election, with 45.98% of the vote to 54.02% for Democrat Jackie Young. She challenged Young again in 1992 in what was now the 51st District, losing with 40.24% of the vote to Young's 59.76%. In 1994, Young sought the Democratic nomination for Lieutenant Governor, and Anderson won the seat with 66.59% to 33.41% for Democrat Lisa Hao Mullinaux. In 1996, Democrat Kenny Goodenow retook the seat, with 52.88% to Anderson's 47.12%. She unsuccessfully challenged Goodenow again in 1998, and in 2000 lost the Republican primary to Joe Gomes, who would go on to unseat Goodenow in the general election.
