= Paul Verdier =

American actor

- Occupations: Stage, television actor, stage director, playwright
- Spouse: Sonia Lloveras-Verdier

Paul Verdier (died 6 September 2015) was a stage director, actor, and playwright, who also had a number of guest parts in American television. He was married to Sonia Lloveras-Verdier.

Before moving to the United States, Verdier was a member of the Paris-based repertory companies of Jean-Louis Barrault/Madeleine Renaud and Nicolas Bataille.

Verdier and his wife opened the Stages Theatre Center in Hollywood in 1982, as a venue for bringing "the richness, flavor and variety of World Theatre to Los Angeles audiences".

In 1986, the couple opened a French restaurant—Cafe des Artistes—next door to the theatre.

== Plays ==
partial list

- Tales for people under 3 years of age (1982) – Translated, adapted and directed by Paul Verdier, from the play by Eugène Ionesco
- Slowmotion (1988) – Translated and directed by Paul Verdier, from the play by Eduardo Pavlovsky
- English Mint (1988) – Translated and directed by Paul Verdier, from L'Amante Anglaise by Marguerite Duras
- 1789 (October 1989) – Translated, adapted and directed by Paul Verdier, from the 1970 play by Ariane Mnouchkine
- The night of Picasso (1990) – Translated and directed by Paul Verdier, from the play by Edoardo Erba
- Porco selvatico (1991) – Translated and directed by Paul Verdier, from the play by Edoardo Erba
- La Bête (1993 by playwright David Hirson) – Directed by Paul Verdier
- Miss Margarida's Way (by playwright Roberto Athayde) – Directed by Paul Verdier
- Changes (1995 by playwright Barbara Tarbuck) – Produced and directed by Paul Verdier
- Hyenas (2003) – Translated, adapted and directed by Paul Verdier, from a play by Christian Siméon

== Filmography ==
Year	Title	Role	Notes
1965	The Art of Love	Painter	Uncredited
1965	The Cincinnati Kid	Second Bettor	Uncredited
1965	My Favorite Martian	Abu	Episode: "Bottled Martian"
1965	Do Not Disturb	Asst. Concierge	Uncredited
1966	Made in Paris	Frenchman	Uncredited
1966	The Russians Are Coming, the Russians Are Coming	Maliavin	
1967	The Rat Patrol	Benet	Episode: "The Two If by Sea Raid"
1968	The Thomas Crown Affair	Elevator Operator	
1969	My Friend Tony		Episode: "Corey Doesn't Live Here Anymore"
1979	Hart to Hart	Jean-Claude	Episode: "Murder Between Friends"
1979	The French Atlantic Affair	Claude	3 episodes
1980	Waikiki	French Tourist	TV movie
1985-1986	Magnum, P.I.	Jean Claude Fornier	2 episodes
1986	MacGyver	Francois Villars	Episode: "The Escape"
1987	St. Elsewhere	Mr. Gadski	Episode: "Night of the Living Bed"
1987	En silence		Short
1988	Wiseguy	Jacques Lizot	Episode: "The Merchant of Death"
1989	Santa Barbara	Claude Benoit	4 episodes, (final appearance)
