= Three Amigos =

1986 American Western comedy film by John Landis

¡Three Amigos!
- Theatrical release poster
- Directed by: John Landis
- Written by: Steve Martin; Lorne Michaels; Randy Newman
- Produced by: George Folsey Jr.; Lorne Michaels
- Starring: Steve Martin; Chevy Chase; Martin Short; Alfonso Arau; Tony Plana; Patrice Martinez
- Cinematography: Ronald W. Browne
- Edited by: Malcolm Campbell
- Music by: Elmer Bernstein
- Production companies: HBO Pictures; L.A. Films
- Distributed by: Orion Pictures
- Release date: December 12, 1986
- Running time: 103 minutes
- Country: United States
- Language: English
- Budget: $25 million
- Box office: $39.2 million

¡Three Amigos! is a 1986 American Western comedy film directed by John Landis and written by Steve Martin, Lorne Michaels and Randy Newman, who also composed the film's songs, and starring Martin, Chevy Chase, Martin Short, Alfonso Arau, Tony Plana, and Patrice Martinez. It tells the story of three fired silent film actors who are mistaken for real heroes by the desperate inhabitants of a small Mexican village under threat from notorious bandit El Guapo and his gang.

Produced by Michaels and George Folsey Jr. for HBO Pictures and L.A. Films, the film was distributed by Orion Pictures and released on December 12, 1986. Despite receiving mixed reviews from critics, it grossed $39.2 million at the box office against a $25 million budget and has since gained a cult following for its absurdist humor, musical sequences, and ensemble performances.

== Plot ==
In 1916, the bandit El Guapo and his gang collect tribute from the Mexican village of Santa Poco. Carmen, the village leader's daughter, searches for someone who can rescue her townspeople. Visiting a village church, she sees a silent film featuring The Three Amigos, a trio of gunfighters who protect the innocent. Believing they are real heroes, Carmen sends a telegram asking them to come and stop El Guapo.

At Goldsmith Pictures in California, Lucky Day, Dusty Bottoms and Ned Nederlander, the actors who portray the Amigos, demand a salary increase for their next project. Producer Harry Flugelman, furious at their demands, fires them from the studio. They receive Carmen's telegram, misinterpreting it as a job offer to perform a show in Santa Poco. The Amigos break into the studio to steal back their costumes and head for Mexico.

At a cantina near Santa Poco, a German pilot inquires about El Guapo and demands respect for his friends who will arrive soon. The Amigos stop at the cantina in costume soon afterward and are assumed to be the German's friends. They mistake the fearful patrons for star-struck fans and perform a cheerful song and dance ("My Little Buttercup"). After they leave, the German's associates arrive and shoot up the cantina when the off-guard patrons mock their fine clothes. Carmen picks up the Amigos and takes them to the village. There they are pampered at the best house in town.

The following day, when three of El Guapo's men raid the village in search of tequila, the Amigos do a Hollywood-style stunt show that leaves the men bemused. The bandits ride off, making the villagers think they have defeated the enemy. The village throws a victory party for the Amigos. The following day, El Guapo and his entire gang come to Santa Poco, but the Amigos believe it is another show. After Lucky is shot, they realize they are confronting real bandits and beg for mercy, explaining that they are harmless actors. The Amigos flee in disgrace. El Guapo kidnaps Carmen, and his men loot the village.

Ned persuades Lucky and Dusty to defeat El Guapo and become real heroes. They try summoning a magical swordsman to locate El Guapo, but Dusty botches the ritual and shoots the swordsman. At his hideout, El Guapo prepares for his 40th birthday party, when he will accept a shipment of weapons from the German and then rape Carmen. The Amigos find the hideout by following the German's airplane and swing in from the outer wall with mixed results. Lucky is immediately captured and chained in a dungeon, Dusty crashes into Carmen's room, and Ned is suspended from a piñata.

Dusty and Ned are discovered and held captive; meanwhile Lucky manages to escape the dungeon. The German, having idolized Ned's quick-draw and gun-spinning pistol skills in childhood, challenges him to a duel. Ned kills the German and Lucky holds El Guapo at gunpoint long enough for Carmen and the Amigos to escape in the German's plane.

Returning to Santa Poco with El Guapo's band in pursuit, the Amigos rally the villagers to stand up for themselves with their best talent – sewing. The bandits arrive and are shot at by Amigos from all sides. Most retreat as El Guapo and his henchman Jefe take fatal wounds. The villagers, all dressed as Amigos, emerge and surround El Guapo. He compliments the Three Amigos on their cleverness, then shoots Lucky in the foot before dying. The villagers offer the Amigos all their money but they refuse it with their motto: "Our reward is that justice has been done". They then ride into the sunset.

== Cast ==
- Steve Martin as Lucky Day, a silent film actor.
- Chevy Chase as Dusty Bottoms, a silent film actor.
- Martin Short as Ned Nederlander, a silent film actor.
- Alfonso Arau as El Guapo, the leader of a group of bandits.
- Tony Plana as Jefe, El Guapo's second-in-command.
- Patrice Martinez as Carmen, a villager who seeks help for her town.
- Joe Mantegna as Harry Flugleman, head of Goldsmith Pictures.
- Jorge Cervera as Bandito #1
- Kai Wulff as The German
- Abel Franco as Papa Sanchez
- Fred Asparagus as Bartender
- Jon Lovitz as Morty, one of Flugleman's assistants.
- Phil Hartman as Sam, one of Flugleman's assistants who issues Flugleman's orders through the telephone.
- Betty Carvalho as Mama Sanchez
- Candy Castillo as Bandito #2
- Jeff O'Haco as Bandito #3
- Tino Insana as a Goldsmith Pictures studio guard
- Loyda Ramos as Conchita, a villager.
- Phillip Gordon as Rodrigo, a villager.
- Norbert Weisser as German Thug
- Brian Thompson as German Thug
- Randy Newman as Singing Bush (voice)
- Rebecca Ferratti as Hot Señorita

== Production ==
=== Writing ===
The screenplay was co-written by Steve Martin, Lorne Michaels and Randy Newman. Martin originated the concept and initially hired other writers but he was dissatisfied with the results. He then collaborated with Michaels, who suggested starting fresh and co-writing the script. Newman was brought in to contribute songs alongside the screenplay. The working title was originally Three Caballeros, referencing the 1944 Disney film The Three Caballeros.

=== Casting and stunts ===
Steve Martin performed his own lasso tricks in the film, a skill he learned as a teenager while working at Disneyland.

The casting process saw several changes. Martin had been attached since 1980, and early versions had him starring alongside Dan Aykroyd and John Belushi. At one point, Steven Spielberg was considered to direct, with Bill Murray and Robin Williams also considered for the leads. After Belushi's death, John Candy was offered the role of Ned Nederlander but declined due to a restrictive costume. Candy then recommended Martin Short, who was cast and began a long-lasting professional and personal friendship with Martin.

There were reported tensions during production. Chevy Chase initially resisted delivering a line he thought would make his character Dusty Bottoms look foolish but eventually complied after John Landis threatened to reassign the line to Short. Chase also reportedly made an inappropriate joke related to the Twilight Zone incident, which Landis overheard and reacted to angrily. Despite these issues, Chase later stated that making the film was "the most fun I've ever had".

=== Filming ===
Principal photography took place at various locations in the southwestern United States, including Grants, New Mexico; Simi Valley, California; Coronado National Forest; Old Tucson Studios; Culver City; and Hollywood.

=== Music ===
Randy Newman composed three original songs for the film: "The Ballad of the Three Amigos", "My Little Buttercup" and "Blue Shadows on the Trail". The original score was composed by Elmer Bernstein.

=== Post-production ===
During post-production, director John Landis was undergoing legal proceedings related to the 1983 fatal accident on the set of Twilight Zone: The Movie, restricting his involvement in editing. After he submitted his final cut, Orion Pictures made significant changes by removing several scenes.

=== Deleted scenes ===
The 25th Anniversary Blu-ray release includes several deleted scenes. These feature:

- An alternate opening where El Guapo (Alfonso Arau) raids Santo Poco.
- Extended studio scenes involving the Three Amigos and a subplot with rising star Miss Rene (played by Fran Drescher) with Flugleman explaining to Morty about his streamlining plans. There also a mentioning from Flugleman to Lucky, Dusty, and Ned about how a "Three Amigos" film that had Miss Rene in it didn't do well.
- There were also cut scenes featuring Sam Kinison as a mountain man.

== Music ==
The musical score for ¡Three Amigos! was composed by Elmer Bernstein, with songs written by Randy Newman. Newman also provided the singing voice for the "Singing Bush" character in the film.

Several songs featured in the film are performed by the cast, including "My Little Buttercup" and "Blue Shadows on the Trail". The soundtrack blends orchestral scoring with comedic and Western-themed musical elements reflective of the film's parody style.

A soundtrack album was released and includes the following tracks:

1. "The Ballad of the Three Amigos"
2. "Main Title"
3. "The Big Sneak"
4. "My Little Buttercup"
5. "Santo Poco"
6. "Fiesta and Flamenco"
7. "El Guapo"
8. "The Return of the Amigos"
9. "Blue Shadows on the Trail"
10. "The Singing Bush"
11. "Amigos at the Mission"
12. "Capture"
13. "El Guapo's Birthday"
14. "The Chase"
15. "Amigos, Amigos, Amigos"
16. "Farewell"
17. "End Credits"

== Reception ==
=== Box office ===
¡Three Amigos! was released on December 12, 1986, and grossed approximately $39.4 million domestically. While overseas grosses are unavailable, Landis said that the film performed better outside America.

=== Critical response ===
On Rotten Tomatoes the film holds an approval rating of 44% based on 43 reviews and an average rating of 5.3/10. The site's critical consensus reads, "Three Amigos! stars a trio of gifted comedians and has an agreeably silly sense of humor, but they're often adrift in a dawdling story with too few laugh-out-loud moments." On Metacritic it has a weighted average score of 52 out of 100 based on 13 reviews, indicating "mixed or average reviews". Audiences surveyed by CinemaScore gave the film an average grade "B" on an A+ to F scale.

Roger Ebert of the Chicago Sun-Times gave the film one star out of four, writing, "The ideas to make Three Amigos into a good comedy are here, but the madness is missing." Janet Maslin of The New York Times wrote that it was "likable" but lacked a "distinctive style", though certain jokes are crafted with "enjoyable sophistication". Caroline Wetsbrook of Empire awarded the film three out of five stars and wrote that it was "good-natured enough to sustain its ultimately thin premise".

Neil McNally of the website Den of Geek called it a cult film that was "unfairly overlooked" when first released and praised the performances of Martin, Chase and Short; the comedic timing of Landis' direction; and Bernstein's "sweeping, majestic" score. The film was ranked 79th on Bravo's list of the "100 Funniest Movies".

== See also ==
- List of films featuring fictional films
- Buddy film, Cult film, and Parody film
- Western comedy
- The Three Caballeros – a 1944 Disney film with a similar theme and an original working title inspiration
- Saturday Night Live – several cast and crew were SNL alumni
- Galaxy Quest and Tropic Thunder – films in which actors are mistaken for their characters
- Triple rolling non-release suplex, known as "the three amigos"
