= Magnum, P.I. =

American crime drama television series (1980–1988)

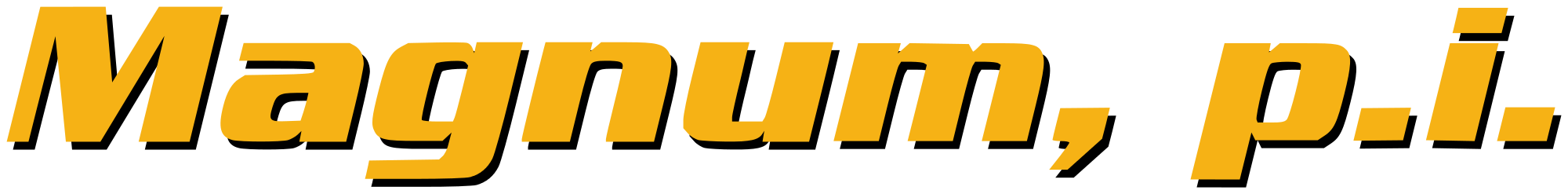
- Series' logo used in seasons 3–8
- Genre: Crime drama
- Created by: Donald P. Bellisario; Glen A. Larson
- Starring: Tom Selleck; John Hillerman; Roger E. Mosley; Larry Manetti
- Narrated by: Tom Selleck
- Theme music composer: Ian Freebairn-Smith (pilot, early season 1); Mike Post; Pete Carpenter
- Composers: Ian Freebairn-Smith (pilot, early season 1); Mike Post; Pete Carpenter
- Country of origin: United States
- Original language: English
- No. of seasons: 8
- No. of episodes: 162 (list of episodes)

Production
- Executive producers: Donald P. Bellisario; Glen A. Larson; Tom Selleck
- Producers: Rick Weaver; Tom Greene; Andrew Schneider; Douglas Weaver
- Production locations: Oʻahu, Hawaii; Honolulu, Hawaii; Waimanalo Beach, Hawaii
- Running time: 46–49 minutes
- Production companies: Belisarius Productions; Glen A. Larson Productions; T.W.S. Productions; Universal Television

Original release
- Network: CBS
- Release: December 11, 1980 – May 1, 1988

Related
- Magnum P.I. (reboot series)

Magnum, P.I. is an American crime drama television series starring Tom Selleck as Thomas Magnum, a private investigator (P.I.) living in Oahu, Hawaii. The series ran from December 11, 1980, to May 1, 1988, during its first-run broadcast on the American television network CBS.

Magnum, P.I. consistently ranked in the top 20 U.S. television programs in the Nielsen ratings during the first five years of its original run, finishing as high as number three for the 1982–83 season. The series entered syndication in 1986 under the title Magnum in order to differentiate reruns from new episodes still airing under the original title on CBS.

A reboot series of the same name was ordered to series on May 11, 2018, and premiered on September 24, 2018, on CBS.

== Premise ==
Thomas Sullivan Magnum IV (played by Tom Selleck) is a private investigator. He lives in the guesthouse of a 200-acre (81 ha) beachfront estate (named "Robin's Nest"), in Oahu, Hawaii, at the invitation of its owner, Robin Masters. Ostensibly this is quid pro quo for Magnum's services based upon his expertise in security; the pilot and several early episodes suggest Magnum had done Masters a favor of some kind, possibly when Masters hired him for a case.

Masters – who is rarely depicted – is the celebrated author of several dozen lurid novels. His voice, heard only in seven episodes, was provided by Orson Welles (except for the last, voiced by Red Crandall).

Magnum lives a luxurious life on the estate and operates as a P.I. on cases that suit him. The only thorn in the side of his near-perfect lifestyle is Jonathan Quayle Higgins III, played by John Hillerman. An ex–British Army regimental sergeant major, he is on the surface a stern, by-the-book caretaker of Robin's Nest, whose strict ways often conflict with Magnum's more easygoing methods.

He patrols Robin's Nest with his two highly trained "lads", Dobermanns named Zeus and Apollo. Magnum has free use of the guesthouse and the car, a Ferrari 308 GTS Quattrovalvole, but as a humorous aside in various episodes, often has to bargain with Higgins for use of estate amenities such as the tennis courts, wine cellar, and expensive cameras.

The relationship between Magnum and Higgins is initially cool, but as the series progresses, an unspoken respect and fondness of sorts grows between them. Many episodes dedicate more screen time to this "odd couple" pairing after the relationship proved popular with fans. A recurrent theme throughout the last two seasons, starting in the episode "Paper War", involves Magnum's sneaking suspicion that Higgins is actually Masters, for he opens Masters's mail, calls Masters's Ferrari "my car", etc. This suspicion is never completely disproved, although in at least one episode Higgins is shown alone in a room, picking up a ringing phone and talking to Masters, indicating they are different people.

Aside from Higgins, Magnum's two main companions on the islands are Theodore "T.C." Calvin (Roger E. Mosley), who runs a one-person local helicopter charter and tour van service, Island Hoppers, and often finds himself persuaded by Magnum to fly him during various cases, and Orville Wilbur Richard "Rick" Wright (Larry Manetti), who refuses to use his Wright brothers–esque given name of Orville and owns a local bar. In the pilot episode, this was Rick's Cafe Americain, inspired by Casablanca, with Rick appearing in suitable 1930s attire. After completing the pilot, though, executives felt that audiences would be unable to fully connect with this element.

Instead, Rick moved to running the plush, beachside King Kamehameha Club, which has exclusive membership and Higgins on the board of directors. Magnum often strolls around the club, using its facilities and running up an ever-unpaid tab, further fueling the Magnum-Higgins feud. T.C. and Rick are both former Marines from VMO-2 with whom Magnum, a former member of the United States Navy SEALs and Naval Intelligence officer, served in the Vietnam War. (Note: The three friends wear a gold Team Ring, which bears a Cross of Lorraine on a black field, as a bond of wartime camaraderie.) The series was one of the first to deal with Vietnam veterans as "human beings" and not as shell-shocked killers, and was praised by many ex-servicemen groups for doing so.

Magnum often dupes or bribes T.C. and Rick into aiding him on his cases, much to their frustration. T.C., whose assistance often involves the use of his helicopter, often tells Magnum, "gas money. All I need is gas money", referring to the high cost of the helicopter's fuel.

Magnum comes and goes as he pleases, works only when he wants, and has almost unlimited use of the Ferrari and many other luxuries of the estate. He keeps a mini-refrigerator with a seemingly endless supply of beer ("altbier"), wears his father's treasured Rolex GMT Master wristwatch, and is surrounded by countless beautiful women, who are often victims of crime, his clients, or otherwise connected to the cases he solves.

Other characteristics specific to Magnum are his thick moustache, baseball caps (usually a Detroit Tigers or VMO-2 cap), a rubber chicken, and a variety of colorful Aloha shirts. Nearly every episode is narrated, in voice-over, by Magnum at various points. At the end of the seventh season, Magnum was to be killed off, to end the series. Following an outcry from fans who demanded a more satisfactory conclusion, an eighth season was produced to bring Magnum "back to life" and round off the series.

== Cast ==
=== Main cast ===
The cast of Magnum, P.I. (left-to-right), Larry Manetti as Rick, Tom Selleck as Magnum, Roger E. Mosley as T.C., and John Hillerman as Higgins

- Tom Selleck as Thomas Magnum
- Roger E. Mosley as Theodore "T.C." Calvin
- Larry Manetti as Orville "Rick" Wright (Note: In the series finale, "Resolutions 2", the priest at Rick's wedding announces his full name as Orville Wilbur Richard Wright. Rick disliked being named after both of the Wright brothers, and preferred his nickname.)
- John Hillerman as Jonathan Higgins

=== Recurring characters ===
- Lieutenant Yoshi Tanaka: A homicide-division police lieutenant with the Honolulu police department (Kwan Hi Lim), he has a slight Lieutenant Columbo–like enigmatic quality, characterized by his casual dress and ironic sense of humor. He is also, like Magnum, a Detroit Tigers fan. He appears in Seasons 2–8.
- Agatha Chumley: Higgins's stereotypically English lady friend (Gillian Dobb), who seems to have a crush on Higgins. Her first appearance was in the episode "Black on White". She appears in Seasons 3–8.
- Colonel "Buck" Greene: A Marine Corps aviator and intelligence officer (Lance LeGault), who is often Magnum's nemesis in seasons 2–8. LeGault also played John W. Newton, aka "Delta One", in episode 9 of season 1, "Missing in Action".
- Carol Baldwin: An assistant district attorney (Patty McCormack in season 1, followed by Kathleen Lloyd in seasons 3–8); before playing Carol Baldwin, Lloyd guest-starred in the episode "Almost Home" (season 3, episode 11) as Bridget Archer.
- Lieutenant "Mac" McReynolds: A doughnut-munching Office of Naval Intelligence (ONI) lieutenant (Jeff MacKay), killed by a car bomb planted by "Ivan", a Russian KGB officer. Mac returns as a ghost for four episodes ("Mac's Back", "Limbo", "Infinity and Jelly Doughnuts" and "Pleasure Principle") and later as a lookalike character. In the pilot, MacKay portrays "Ski", a guard at the entrance gate of Pearl Harbor. He appears in Seasons 1–3 and 7–8.
- Jim Bonnick: A con man and an ex-Navy pilot who was released on a medical discharge (Jeff MacKay); he is Mac McReynolds's lookalike. In at least one episode ("Mac's Back"), MacKay appears in both roles. He appears in Seasons 5–8.
- Francis "Icepick" Hofstetler: An American loan shark and major underworld figure from Chicago, and a quasi-father figure to Rick Wright (Walter Chotzen and later Elisha Cook Jr.).
- Dr. Ibold, M.D. "Doc Ibold": A minor character (Glenn Cannon) who appeared in episodes when the script called for a physician. First referred to as "Script Writer #1", he is known for prescribing opiates for any and all ailments. He appears in Seasons 2–8. Cannon also plays Dr. Bernard Kessler in Episode 1.7, "Never Again...Never Again".
- Michelle Hue: The love of Magnum's life (Marta DuBois); she and Magnum married in Vietnam but the devoutly Catholic Michelle had the marriage annulled after her first husband, a North Vietnamese general who was presumed dead, resurfaced. Magnum had believed that Michelle was killed during the 1975 evacuation of Saigon. She appears in Seasons 2–8.
- Lily Catherine Hue: Daughter to Magnum and Michelle Hue (Kristen Carreira). Michelle entrusts Lily to Magnum's care but doesn't reveal that she is his daughter. Although she was raised as the daughter of General Hue, Lily Catherine learned Magnum-related things from Michelle, such as "Detroit Tigers" and "Rick, T.C., Thomas". By "Resolutions" (May 1988), General Hue's enemies had killed Hue, Michelle, and Michelle's second husband, Edward Durant. Lily Catherine was presumed dead and was reunited with Magnum, who returned to his career as a Naval Intelligence officer to protect her. She appears in seasons 7–8.
- Lieutenant (later Lieutenant Commander) Maggie Poole: The successor of the deceased Mac McReynolds (Jean Bruce Scott), she dislikes her superior, Marine Corps Colonel Greene. She appears in Seasons 3–8.
- Luther H. Gillis: A mock film noir St. Louis private eye with a Boston accent (Eugene Roche), whose deception, dissembling, and disturbing capacity for violence Magnum almost always underestimates or overlooks. Gillis provides the narration in the five episodes in which he appears in Seasons 4–8.
- Lieutenant Nolan Page: A hard-nosed, no-nonsense Honolulu Police Department lieutenant with a New York accent (Joe Santos), he assists Magnum on several cases. He appears in Seasons 7–8.
- Moki: The bartender of the King Kamehameha Club in Season 1; later replaced by Keoki. He appears in Seasons 1–2.
- Keoki: The bartender/server of the King Kamehameha Club, beginning in season 2. He is arrested in season 4 by Lt. Tanaka for robbing the club in the episode "I Witness". He appears in seasons 2–4.
- Bryant Calvin, T.C.'s son in seasons 7 and 8, played by Shavar Ross.

== Setting ==
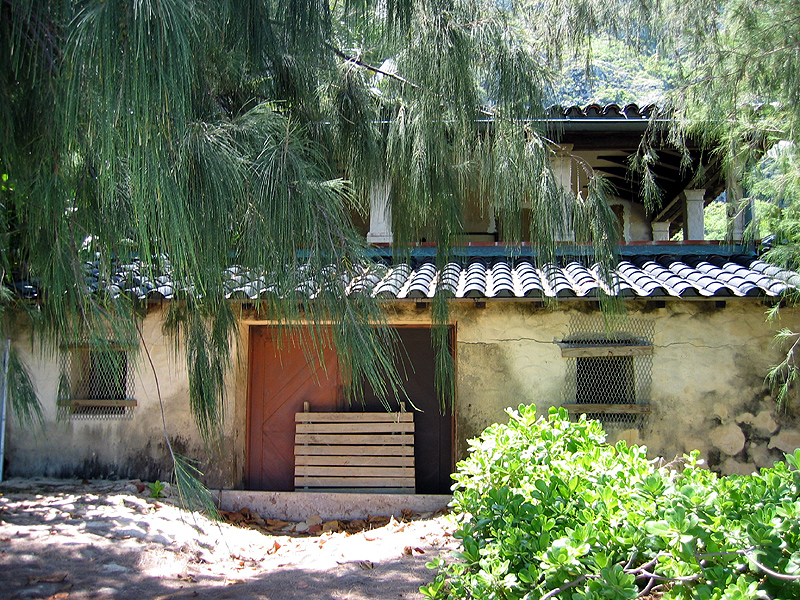
The guesthouse in Magnum, P.I., a boathouse during the mid-2000s

Robin's Nest (21.324917°N 157.679526°W) is the fictional beach front estate on the island of Oahu, Hawaii, which serves as the residence of the main characters. In the series, it is owned by renowned novelist Robin Masters, who employs Jonathan Higgins as the estate's caretaker and Thomas Magnum as its security expert. Higgins resides in the estate's main house while Magnum occupies the guest house.

In reality, the 3-acre (1.2 ha) beachfront property was on Oahu's east shore at 41-505 Hawaii Route 72, near Waimanalo Beach, Hawaii (21°19′30″N 157°40′48″W). Designed by American architect Louis Davis and called "Pahonu" ("turtle enclosure" in Hawaiian), it was also known as "The Anderson Estate" after its longtime owner, politician Eve G. Anderson. The grounds were used for hundreds of years to raise green sea turtles for the Hawaiian royal family and include a 500-by-50-foot stone wall that surrounds the former turtle-raising pond. Since 1978, the turtle pond has been on the National Register of Historic Places listings in Hawaii. The property was a residential estate from the early 1930s onward, comprising an 11,000-square-foot (1,000 m^{2}) main house, a boathouse (which in the series appears as the guesthouse Magnum occupies), a gatehouse, and private tennis court.

Owned in January 2014 by Cox Communications heiress Barbara Cox Anthony, it was placed on the market with Sotheby's for $15.75 million and sold for $8.7 million in March 2015. In April 2018, the estate was demolished by its new owner, a friend of former President Barack Obama.

Many of the indoor scenes of Magnum, P.I. were filmed on the old Hawaii Five-O soundstage, as the network did not wish for its Hawaiian production facilities to go to waste after Hawaii Five-O ended its run.

Through the years, fans of the show have noted commonalities in the settings of time and space (the so-called fictional TV universe) between Magnum, P.I. and Hawaii Five-O. For example, in Season 1, Episode 5, "Thank Heavens for Little Girls, and Big Ones Too", Higgins calls Five-O to report a theft. In Season 1, Episode 6, "Skin Deep", Magnum gets on the radio pretending he's with the police and asks: "Billy, this is McGarrett of Five-O. Is David Norman armed?" The producers of Magnum, P.I. unsuccessfully attempted to convince Jack Lord to make a cameo.

In a 2013 episode of the Hawaii Five-0 remake, the characters "sing" the Magnum, P.I. theme song while discussing which person most resembled the characters on that program. The purported connection between the programs appears to be preserved in the remakes, as explained by their creators in TV Guide, where plans for a crossover were announced as well as acknowledgment of the coexistence of Magnum with Hawaii Five-0 in the same TV universe. A Hawaii Five-0 and Magnum P.I. crossover event aired on CBS in January 2020, with the Hawaii Five-0 episode "Ihea 'oe i ka wa a ka ua e loku ana?" (Hawaiian for "Where were you when the rain was pouring?") followed by the Magnum P.I. episode "Desperate Measures".

== Theme music ==
The original theme music for the opening credits of the pilot episode was a mid-tempo jazzy piece by Ian Freebairn-Smith. This music was also used for the next nine regular episodes.

Beginning in Episode 12, it was replaced by a more up tempo theme typical of 1980s action series by Mike Post and Pete Carpenter with guitar by Larry Carlton. This theme had been used during the show and over the closing credits from Episode 8. A longer version of this second theme ("Theme from Magnum P.I.", 3:25 in duration) credited to Post was released as a single by Elektra Records in 1982 and featured on the Billboard Hot 100 chart that same year, peaking at No. 25 on May 8, 1982. This version also appeared on Post's 1982 album Television Theme Songs.

== Vehicles ==
=== Cars ===
Robin Masters' cars (with license plates)

- "ROBIN 1"
  - 1979 Ferrari 308 GTS - season 1
  - 1981 Ferrari 308 GTSi - season 2
  - 1982 Ferrari 308 GTSi - season 3
  - 1984 Ferrari 308 GTS Quattrovalvole - seasons 4–8
- "ROBIN 2"
  - 1980 Audi 5000 - seasons 1–4 (2 units with one blown up in S01E05)
  - 1985 Audi 5000 - seasons 5–8
  - 1974 Jaguar XJ (seen only in S04E18)

(all these sedans were in various shades of dark grey)

- "ROBIN 3"
  - 1980 GMC Jimmy Sierra (full size K5) — season 1–3
  - 1983 GMC S15 Jimmy (mid-size S-series) — seasons 4–6
  - 1984 Jeep Cherokee — seasons 7–8

(all these SUVs were in shades of brown, with red stripe on the C/K & large yellow stripe on the S15)

- "Robin 23"
  - 1981 Ferrari 308 GTSi in dark green/Verde Pino – seen only in the episode "Summer School" (S06E13). This car was provided by Robin Masters for his visiting nephew, 'R.J.'.
- "56E-478"; regular/non-vanity license plate
  - 1978 Ferrari 308 GTS (seen in the pilot, and all episodes' opening credits)

Others

- Island Hoppers (TC's) van — Volkswagen Type 2 (T3)
- Rick's convertible — Mercedes-Benz R107. Col. Buck Green referred to it as a 450 SL when Rick went missing, but he was also seen in 380 SL (S02E06) and a 560 SL (S07E17). Rick also drove 1978 Chevrolet Corvette in which Thomas and Rick drive side-by-side on a two-lane byway (S01E01). Rick drove the Mercedes-Benz from the middle of Season 2 through to the end of the series.
- Rick's Datsun 280ZX. Rick drove this car when the series started until the middle of season 2, after which he drove the Mercedes-Benz.
- Magnum's Beetle — 1966 Volkswagen Beetle convertible. In 1979, having just opened up his private investigator business, Magnum drove a battered blue Volkswagen Beetle convertible, with a rusted driver's side door.
- Magnum's Jaguar — 1969 Jaguar E-Type. Magnum drove a red Jaguar XKE convertible, in very poor condition, in the episode "Blind Justice" (S05E07) after Higgins cut him off from using the Ferrari.
- The Bentley — 1937 Bentley 3.5 Litre Drophead Coupe (Gurney Nutting body). When Magnum and Higgins visit England in the Season 6 opener, when Robin Masters had just bought a new estate, "Robin's Keep", Magnum drives the old Bentley, the only car included with the estate. The car was previously driven by James Bond in the unofficial 1983 movie Never Say Never Again.

=== Aircraft ===
- Island Hoppers (TC's) helicopter — MD Helicopters MD 500 (various models)
- Ken Enderlin Charters — N9267F is a Hughes Model 369HS built in 1975, Construction Number (C/N) 1150778S, in the episodes "Dream a Little Dream" and "Missing Melody".

== Development and production ==
Publicity photo 1980

Development of Magnum, P.I. was originally slated at ABC, which aired other Glen A. Larson series The Hardy Boys/Nancy Drew Mysteries (1977–1979) and Battlestar Galactica (1978–1979). In January 1979, ABC cancelled both series, and development on Magnum, P.I. Larson then took the series over to CBS.

Selleck's contract commitment to the Magnum, P.I. series famously cost him the role of Indiana Jones in the first Indiana Jones film, Raiders of the Lost Ark (1981), which went to Harrison Ford. Selleck was unable to take the part of Jones as Magnum was due to start filming in March 1980. Owing to the 1980 AFTRA/Screen Actors Guild strike, production of Magnum was delayed until December 1980, which would have allowed Selleck to play Jones.

In the 1986–87 season 7 of Magnum, P.I., Selleck was brought in as a producer and the program was moved from its Thursday night slot on CBS to Wednesday, which increased its slumping ratings due to competing with The Cosby Show (1984–1992) on NBC.

== Episodes ==
Season	Episodes	Originally released		Rank	Rating
Season	Episodes	First released	Last released	Rank	Rating
1	18	December 11, 1980	April 16, 1981	14	21.0
2	22	October 8, 1981	April 1, 1982	17	20.9
3	23	September 30, 1982	April 28, 1983	3	22.6 (Note: Tied with M*A*S*H)
4	21	September 29, 1983	May 3, 1984	6	22.4
5	22	September 27, 1984	April 4, 1985	15	19.1
6	21	September 26, 1985	April 10, 1986	46	14.6
7	22	October 1, 1986	April 15, 1987	33	16.1
8	13	October 7, 1987	May 1, 1988	40	14.4

=== Crossovers ===
- "Ki'is Don't Lie"—Magnum works with the Simon brothers to recover a stolen Hawaiian artifact that's supposedly cursed. The plot concludes on Simon & Simon in the episode "Emeralds Are Not a Girl's Best Friend".
- "Novel Connection"—Jessica Fletcher comes to Hawaii when an attempt is made on the lives of Robin's guests. The plot concludes on Murder, She Wrote in the episode "Magnum on Ice".

For re-run and overseas purposes, the first half of these crossovers (the Magnum episode) also had alternate endings filmed, which wrapped the story up in a single episode and so allowed repeat showings as "stand-alone" stories rather than two-part crossovers.

One mooted crossover from later in the series' run was with the CBS vigilantism drama The Equalizer, starring Edward Woodward as the retired spy Robert McCall. According to Equalizer executive producer Coleman Luck, interviewed for a special-feature documentary on The Equalizer, the crossover was proposed by Universal Television and was opposed by the Equalizer production staff.

In 1992, three years after the conclusion of Magnum, a script was written for a potential crossover with Donald P. Bellisario's next show, NBC's Quantum Leap, in which Dr. Sam Beckett (Scott Bakula) would "leap" into the body of Thomas Magnum. It is unknown whether any original cast members from Magnum were slated to appear in the episode or how far production had progressed, though test footage does exist of the attempted recreation of Tom Selleck's famous fourth-wall breaking "eyebrow" shot from the opening credits with Bakula in the role.

== Home media ==
Universal Pictures Home Entertainment has released all eight seasons of Magnum, P.I. on DVD in Region 1, 2 and 4. On October 1, 2013, Universal released Magnum, P.I. - The Complete Series on DVD in Region 1. The 42-disc set features all 162 episodes of the series as well as bonus features.

On December 12, 2016, in the United Kingdom, the complete series was released in HD on Blu-ray.

In Australia, Madman Entertainment has re-released all eight seasons on DVD from November 18, 2015, to June 20, 2018, followed by "The Complete Series" on October 9, 2019.

DVD name	Ep #	Release dates		
DVD name	Ep #	Region 1	Region 2*	Region 4
The Complete First Season*	18	September 7, 2004 (Note: The Region 1 version of the Season 1 DVD release comes with an extra disk, featuring extra episodes from later in the series.) (Note: The Season 1 release (both Regions 1 and 2) has an error in the episode "China Doll": the musical cues are about 30 seconds off throughout much of the episode.)	September 13, 2004	December 1, 2004; November 18, 2015 (re-release)
The Complete Second Season	22	April 12, 2005	July 4, 2005	September 19, 2005; November 18, 2015 (re-release)
The Complete Third Season*	23	January 31, 2006	January 30, 2006	July 12, 2006; November 18, 2015 (re-release)
The Complete Fourth Season	21	April 4, 2006	June 26, 2006	September 20, 2006; March 9, 2016 (re-release)
The Complete Fifth Season	22	October 10, 2006	February 12, 2007	March 21, 2007; March 9, 2016 (re-release)
The Complete Sixth Season	21	February 27, 2007	May 7, 2007	July 4, 2007; March 9, 2016 (re-release)
The Complete Seventh Season**	22	October 30, 2007	March 31, 2008	June 4, 2008; May 23, 2018 (re-release)
The Complete Eighth Season***	13	March 4, 2008	May 19, 2008	September 3, 2008; June 20, 2018 (re-release)
Seasons One, Two****, Three & Four	84	N/A	November 20, 2006	N/A
The Complete Series	162	October 1, 2013	March 7, 2016	October 9, 2019

- Region 2 release dates refer to the United Kingdom market only.

* Includes the crossover Season 2 episode from Simon & Simon titled "Emeralds Are Not a Girl's Best Friend".
** Includes the crossover Season 3 episode from Murder, She Wrote titled "Magnum On Ice".
*** Includes the bonus Season 5 episode from The Rockford Files titled "White on White and Nearly Perfect" featuring Tom Selleck.
**** Includes bonus episodes from The A-Team, Season 2 titled "Diamonds 'n' Dust" and Knight Rider, Season 2, titled "Brother's Keeper".

== Awards ==
Selleck won an Emmy in 1984 for his portrayal of the title character. Three years later, co-star John Hillerman also won an Emmy. In 1981, series creators and writers Glen A. Larson and Donald P. Bellisario received an Edgar Award from the Mystery Writers of America for Best Episode in a TV Series. (Note: The 1981 Edgar Award was won for an episode entitled "China Doll".)

=== Golden Globe Awards ===
Magnum, P.I. was nominated for multiple Golden Globe Awards:

Year	Category	Nominee(s)	Result
1982	Golden Globe Award for Best Actor – Television Series Drama	Tom Selleck	Nominated
1982	Golden Globe Award for Best Supporting Actor – Series, Miniseries or Television Film	John Hillerman	Won
1983	Golden Globe Award for Best Television Series – Drama		Nominated
1983	Golden Globe Award for Best Actor – Television Series Drama	Tom Selleck	Nominated
1983	Golden Globe Award for Best Supporting Actor – Series, Miniseries or Television Film	John Hillerman	Nominated
1984	Golden Globe Award for Best Actor – Television Series Drama	Tom Selleck	Nominated
1985	Golden Globe Award for Best Actor – Television Series Drama	Tom Selleck	Won
1985	Golden Globe Award for Best Supporting Actor – Series, Miniseries or Television Film	John Hillerman	Nominated
1986	Golden Globe Award for Best Actor – Television Series Drama	Tom Selleck	Nominated
1987	Golden Globe Award for Best Actor – Television Series Drama	Tom Selleck	Nominated
1987	Golden Globe Award for Best Supporting Actor – Series, Miniseries or Television Film	John Hillerman	Nominated
1988	Golden Globe Award for Best Actor – Television Series Drama	Tom Selleck	Nominated
1988	Golden Globe Award for Best Supporting Actor – Series, Miniseries or Television Film	John Hillerman	Nominated

=== Primetime Emmy Awards ===
Year	Category	Nominee(s)	Episode(s)	Result
1982	Primetime Emmy Award for Outstanding Drama Series			Nominated
1982	Primetime Emmy Award for Outstanding Lead Actor in a Drama Series	Tom Selleck		Nominated
1982	Outstanding Cinematography for a Series	Woody Omens	"Memories are Forever"	Nominated
1983	Primetime Emmy Award for Outstanding Drama Series			Nominated
1983	Primetime Emmy Award for Outstanding Lead Actor in a Drama Series	Tom Selleck		Nominated
1983	Outstanding Film Sound Mixing for a Series		"Did You See The Sunrise?"	Nominated
1984	Primetime Emmy Award for Outstanding Drama Series			Nominated
1984	Primetime Emmy Award for Outstanding Lead Actor in a Drama Series	Tom Selleck		Won
1984	Primetime Emmy Award for Outstanding Supporting Actor in a Drama Series	John Hillerman		Nominated
1985	Primetime Emmy Award for Outstanding Lead Actor in a Drama Series	Tom Selleck		Nominated
1985	Primetime Emmy Award for Outstanding Supporting Actor in a Drama Series	John Hillerman		Nominated
1986	Primetime Emmy Award for Outstanding Lead Actor in a Drama Series	Tom Selleck		Nominated
1986	Primetime Emmy Award for Outstanding Supporting Actor in a Drama Series	John Hillerman		Nominated
1987	Primetime Emmy Award for Outstanding Supporting Actor in a Drama Series	John Hillerman		Won
1988	Primetime Emmy Award for Outstanding Guest Actress in a Drama Series	Gwen Verdon	"Infinity and Jelly Doughnuts"	Nominated
	Outstanding Cinematography for a Series	John C. Finn III	"Unfinished Business"	Nominated
	Outstanding Sound Mixing for a Drama Series		"Resolution"	Nominated

=== Other awards ===
Year	Award	Category	Nominee(s)	Work	Result
1982	American Cinema Editors	Best Edited Episode for a Television Series	Michael Berman & Ed Guidotti	"Memories are Forever"	Won
1981	Edgar Award	Best Television Episode	Donald P. Bellisario & Glen A. Larson	"China Doll"	Won
1981	People's Choice Awards	Favorite New TV Dramatic Program			Nominated
1983	Young Artist Award	Best Young Actress, Guest in a Television Series	Dana Hill		Won
1983	Young Artist Award	Best Young Actress, Guest in a Television Series	Kim Richards		Nominated
1983	Young Artist Award	Best Young Actor, Guest in a Television Series	Chad Sheets		Nominated
1984	Young Artist Award	Best Young Actor, Guest in a Television Series	R.J. Williams		Nominated
2003	TV Land Award	Hippest Fashion Plate – Male	Tom Selleck		Nominated
2005	TV Land Award	Favorite Private Eye	Tom Selleck		Nominated
2009	TV Land Award	Hero Award			Won

== Detroit Tigers incident ==
On September 16, 2017, a group of 45 men dressed as Thomas Magnum were ejected from a Detroit Tigers game for smoking and catcalling women in the park. The story quickly became one of international interest as the group, from nearby Allen Park, Michigan gave dozens of interviews to newspapers, magazines, radio stations, podcasts and more.

== Proposed sequels ==
In October 2013, Selleck said Tom Clancy had planned to write a screenplay for a Magnum, P.I. film in the 1990s, with Universal Pictures interested in producing it. However, the project never materialized.

In September 2016, ABC began developing a sequel from Leverage creator John Rogers and producer Eva Longoria centering on Lily "Tommy" Magnum, which never made it to series.

== Reboot ==
In October 2017, CBS announced they had issued a pilot commitment for a reboot of the series, to be developed by Peter M. Lenkov, who has helped remake other series like Hawaii Five-0 and MacGyver for the network. CBS officially ordered the pilot three months later, along with one for a reboot of another hit 1980s television series for the network, Cagney & Lacey, as well as one for 1990s favorite Murphy Brown. On February 20, 2018, Jay Hernandez was cast as Thomas Magnum. (Note: Currently, Tom Selleck stars as NYPD Commissioner Frank Reagan in another CBS series, Blue Bloods, which immediately followed the Magnum P.I. reboot until the latter show’s cancellation by CBS and revival by NBC.)
