= Chas. Floyd Johnson =

American television producer and actor

- Born: Charles Floyd Johnson; Camden, New Jersey, United States
- Education: Howard University (BA); Howard University (J.D.)
- Occupations: Actor; Producer; Activist; Author

Chas. Floyd Johnson (born Charles Floyd Johnson) is an African-American television producer, actor and activist, known for The Rockford Files (1975–1980), Magnum, P.I. (1982–1988), and Red Tails (2012). A three-time Emmy Award winner (and seven-time nominee), Johnson currently serves as Executive Producer of the CBS Television Studios' television series, NCIS (2003–2019), following his tenure as an executive producer of the long-running CBS television series, JAG (1997–2005).

== Early life ==
A native of Camden, New Jersey, Johnson spent most of his childhood in Middletown, Delaware. His mother, Bertha Ellen Seagers, was a school principal and teacher, and his father, Orange Maull Johnson, was a realtor. In 1956, he entered The Stony Brook School as the second African American student, graduating in 1958. Johnson received both his Bachelor of Arts and his Juris Doctor Degrees from Howard University.

== Career ==
The Vietnam draft brought Johnson to the United States Army, stationed at Fort Dix, New Jersey. Because of his legal education, Johnson was assigned to the Courts and Boards Defense Counsel. Once his military service was completed, Johnson relocated to Washington, D.C., and joined the U.S. Copyright Office. During this period as a copyright lawyer, Johnson took various film and acting classes in his free time. He also got acting roles in local theatre and in various film/television projects.

Deciding to focus on a career in entertainment, Johnson left the copyright office and moved to Los Angeles in 1971. Once in Los Angeles, Johnson immersed himself in the Los Angeles entertainment scene. Johnson took more acting and film/television production classes.

He got a position in the mail room at Universal Studios. After just two days, Johnson applied for a newly opened position and became a Production Coordinator. While in this role for a variety of television shows, Johnson caught the attention of Stephen J. Cannell and Meta Rosenberg. They were the producers of The Rockford Files. This led to the big break that would kick-off Johnson's professional producer career: he became the show's second associate producer in 1974.

Along with Robert Hooks, Brock Peters, and Denise Nicholas, Johnson was a founding member of The Media Forum and he served as a former vice president. He was a vice president of Communications Bridge, a Los Angeles training program for minority students in the fields of Film and Television Production. He is a member of the Caucus for Producers, Writers and Directors, the Academy of Television Arts & Sciences, the Screen Actors Guild, the Writers Guild of America and the Producers Guild of America, for which he previously served, for many years, as both an officer and a member of its board of directors. With the Producers Guild, he founded and produced the Oscar Micheaux Awards, which was the forerunner of the PGA's "Celebration of Diversity Awards".

== Author ==
Johnson is a co-author (along with George H. Hill and Lorraine Raglin) of the book, Black Women in Television: An Illustrated History and Bibliography, published in 1990.

Johnson, as a member of the Longwood Writers Workshop, is a contributing author to the book, A Gathering of Voices (2024)

== Awards ==
Johnson has received several notable awards.

Primetime Emmys

- Outstanding Drama Series – Winner – The Rockford Files – 1978
- Outstanding Drama Series – Nominee – The Rockford Files – 1979
- Outstanding Drama Series – Nominee – Magnum, P.I. – 1983
- Outstanding Drama Series – Nominee – Magnum, P.I. – 1984

Johnson produced and performed in the 1982 KCET Public Television Special, Voices of Our People ... in Celebration of Black Poetry, where he received an Emmy Award for “Outstanding Performer in an Entertainment Special” and another Emmy Award for “Outstanding Entertainment Special.”

Other recent awards include the Producer of the Year for NCIS (CBS), the Chairman's Award and the Lifetime Achievement Award from the Caucus for Producers, Writers & Directors, the Diversity Award from the Producers Guild of America and the Ron Brown Award from Minorities in Broadcasting.

== Acting and production credits ==
=== Stage appearances ===
- Alton Scales, The Sign in Sidney Brustein's Window, Theatre Lobby, Washington, DC, 1967
- Focus on Blacks in American Theatre, Back Alley Theatre, Washington, DC, 1967
- Bernard, The Boys in the Band, Morgan Theatre, Santa Monica, CA, 1972
- Lieutenant, The Drumhead, Merle Oberon Theatre, Los Angeles, 1974

=== Television work ===
Executive producer; with others; series

- (And associate producer and producer) The Rockford Files (also known as Jim Rockford, Private Investigator), NBC, 1974–1980
- Magnum, P.I., CBS, 1987–1988
- B.L. Stryker, ABC, 1989–1990
- Quantum Leap, NBC, 1992–1993
- (With Donald P. Bellisario) JAG, CBS, 1996–2005
- NCIS, CBS, 2003–2026

Producer; with others; series

- Magnum, P.I., CBS, 1980–1984
- (With Mark Horowitz, and with Gordon Dawson) Bret Maverick (also known as Bret Maverick: The Lazy Ace), NBC, 1981–1982
- (With Phil DeGuere) Simon & Simon, CBS, 1982–1983
- (Supervising producer) Magnum, P.I., CBS, 1985–1986

Executive producer; with others; movies

- Auntie Sue (B.L. Stryker episode), 1989
- The Dancer's Touch (B.L. Stryker episode), 1989
- Die Laughing (B.L. Stryker episode), 1989
- The King of Jazz (B.L. Stryker episode), 1989
- Royal Gambit (B.L. Stryker episode), 1989
- (With James Garner) The Rockford Files: Murder and Misdemeanor, CBS, 1997

=== Film ===
Producer

- Red Tails, 2012
- Get in the Way: The Journey of John Lewis, 2016
