= List of The Rockford Files episodes =

The Rockford Files is an American detective drama television series starring James Garner that aired on the NBC network between September 13, 1974, and January 10, 1980, and has remained in syndication to the present day. Garner portrays Los Angeles-based private investigator Jim Rockford with Noah Beery Jr., in the supporting role of his father, a retired truck driver nicknamed "Rocky".

The series debuted with a made-for-TV movie simply titled The Rockford Files. During the series run, there were a number of two-part episodes, as well as long (90 or 120 minutes) episodes that were split into two parts for syndication (and on later DVD releases). Filming stopped in the middle of the sixth season (1979–80), on the advice of star James Garner's doctor. Garner, who had filmed many of his own stunts, had injured his back and knees and also developed an ulcer.

In the 1990s, after the settlement of several long-running legal actions between Garner's Cherokee Productions and Universal Studios, Rockford returned to the air in a series of eight TV movies on CBS.

== Series overview ==
Season	Episodes	Originally released	
Season	Episodes	First released	Last released
1	23	September 13, 1974	March 7, 1975
2	22	September 12, 1975	March 19, 1976
3	22	September 24, 1976	April 1, 1977
4	22	September 16, 1977	February 24, 1978
5	22	September 22, 1978	April 13, 1979
6	12	September 28, 1979	January 10, 1980

== Episodes ==
=== TV movie pilot (1974) ===
"Backlash of the Hunter", starring James Garner (as Jim Rockford), Joe Santos (as Dennis Becker), and Stuart Margolin (as Evelyn "Angel" Martin) all debut in their series roles. Also featured is Robert Donley as Joseph "Rocky" Rockford, a role that would be recast in the subsequent series. Lindsay Wagner plays the role of Sara Butler. Sara Butler’s brother is played by Bill Mumy

Title	Directed by	Written by	Original release date
"The Rockford Files" syndicated version retitled "Backlash of the Hunter"	Richard T. Heffron	Story by : Roy Huggins; Teleplay by : Stephen J. Cannell	March 27, 1974

=== Season 1 (1974–75) ===
James Garner stars as Jim Rockford, and Noah Beery as his father Rocky. Joe Santos is a frequent recurring guest as Dennis Becker. Gretchen Corbett appears on a recurring basis as Beth. Stuart Margolin appears only twice as Evelyn "Angel" Martin, but his appearances will become more frequent as the series continues. Tom Atkins is seen on a recurring basis as Lt. Diehl.

No. overall	No. in season	Title	Directed by	Written by	Original release date
1	1	"The Kirkoff Case"	Lou Antonio	Story by : John Thomas James; Teleplay by : Stephen J. Cannell	September 13, 1974
2	2	"The Dark and Bloody Ground"	Michael Schultz	Story by : John Thomas James; Teleplay by : Juanita Bartlett	September 20, 1974
3	3	"The Countess"	Russ Mayberry	Story by : John Thomas James; Teleplay by : Stephen J. Cannell	September 27, 1974
4	4	"Exit Prentiss Carr"	Alex Grasshoff	Story by : John Thomas James; Teleplay by : Juanita Bartlett	October 4, 1974
5	5	"Tall Woman in Red Wagon"	Jerry London	Story by : John Thomas James; Teleplay by : Stephen J. Cannell	October 11, 1974
6	6	"This Case Is Closed"	Bernard L. Kowalski	Story by : John Thomas James; Teleplay by : Stephen J. Cannell	October 18, 1974
7	7	"This Case Is Closed"	Bernard L. Kowalski	Story by : John Thomas James; Teleplay by : Stephen J. Cannell	October 18, 1974
8	8	"The Big Ripoff"	Vincent McEveety	Story by : John Thomas James; Teleplay by : Robert Hamner	October 25, 1974
9	9	"Find Me If You Can"	Lawrence Doheny	Story by : John Thomas James; Teleplay by : Juanita Bartlett	November 1, 1974
10	10	"In Pursuit of Carol Thorne"	Charles S. Dubin	Story by : John Thomas James; Teleplay by : Stephen J. Cannell	November 8, 1974
11	11	"The Dexter Crisis"	Alex Grasshoff	Gloryette Clark	November 15, 1974
12	12	"Caledonia – It's Worth a Fortune"	Stuart Margolin (Angel Martin)	Story by : John Thomas James; Teleplay by : Juanita Bartlett	December 6, 1974
13	13	"Profit and Loss: Part 1"	Lawrence Doheny	Story by : John Thomas James; Teleplay by : Stephen J. Cannell	December 20, 1974
14	14	"Profit and Loss: Part 2"	Lawrence Doheny	Story by : John Thomas James; Teleplay by : Stephen J. Cannell	December 27, 1974
15	15	"Aura Lee, Farewell"	Jackie Cooper	Story by : John Thomas James; Teleplay by : Edward J. Lakso	January 3, 1975
16	16	"Sleight of Hand"	William Wiard	Teleplay by : Stephen J. Cannell and Jo Swerling Jr. Based on the novel "Thin Air" by : Howard Browne	January 17, 1975
17	17	"Counter Gambit"	Jackie Cooper	Howard Berk and Juanita Bartlett	January 24, 1975
18	18	"Claire"	William Wiard	Edward J. Lakso and Stephen J. Cannell	January 31, 1975
19	19	"Say Goodbye to Jennifer"	Jackie Cooper	Story by : John Thomas James; Teleplay by : Juanita Bartlett and Rudolph Borchert	February 7, 1975
20	20	"Charlie Harris at Large"	Russ Mayberry	Story by : John Thomas James; Teleplay by : Zekial Marko	February 14, 1975
21	21	"The Four Pound Brick"	Lawrence Doheny	Story by : Leigh Brackett; Teleplay by : Leigh Brackett and Juanita Bartlett	February 21, 1975
22	22	"Just by Accident"	Jerry London	Charles Sailor & Eric Kaldor	February 28, 1975
23	23	"Roundabout"	Lou Antonio	Story by : Mitchell Lindemann; Teleplay by : Mitchell Lindemann and Edward J. Lakso	March 7, 1975

=== Season 2 (1975–76) ===
Garner and Beery are billed as stars. Santos, Corbett, Margolin and Atkins are frequently recurring guests.

No. overall	No. in season	Title	Directed by	Written by	Original release date
24	1	"The Aaron Ironwood School of Success"	Lou Antonio	Stephen J. Cannell	September 12, 1975
25	2	"The Farnsworth Stratagem"	Lawrence Doheny	Juanita Bartlett	September 19, 1975
26	3	"Gearjammers: Part 1"	William Wiard	Story by : Stephen J. Cannell; Teleplay by : Don Carlos Dunaway	September 26, 1975
27	4	"Gearjammers: Part 2"	William Wiard	Story by : Stephen J. Cannell; Teleplay by : Don Carlos Dunaway	October 3, 1975
28	5	"The Deep Blue Sleep"	William Wiard	Story by : Chas. Floyd Johnson; Teleplay by : Juanita Bartlett	October 10, 1975
29	6	"The Great Blue Lake Land and Development Company"	Lawrence Doheny	Juanita Bartlett	October 17, 1975
30	7	"The Real Easy Red Dog"	Ivan Dixon	Stephen J. Cannell	October 31, 1975
31	8	"Resurrection in Black and White"	Russ Mayberry	Juanita Bartlett and Stephen J. Cannell	November 7, 1975
32	9	"Chicken Little Is a Little Chicken"	Lawrence Doheny	Stephen J. Cannell	November 14, 1975
33	10	"2 Into 5.56 Won't Go"	Jeannot Szwarc	Stephen J. Cannell	November 21, 1975
34	11	"Pastoria Prime Pick"	Lawrence Doheny	Gordon Dawson	November 28, 1975
35	12	"The Reincarnation of Angie"	Jerry London	Stephen J. Cannell	December 5, 1975
36	13	"The Girl in the Bay City Boys Club"	James Garner	Juanita Bartlett	December 19, 1975
37	14	"The Hammer of C Block"	Jerry London	Gordon Dawson	January 9, 1976
38	15	"The No-Cut Contract"	Lou Antonio	Stephen J. Cannell	January 16, 1976
39	16	"A Portrait of Elizabeth"	Meta Rosenberg	Stephen J. Cannell	January 23, 1976
40	17	"Joey Blue Eyes"	Lawrence Doheny	Walter Dallenbach	January 30, 1976
41	18	"In Hazard"	Jackie Cooper	Juanita Bartlett	February 6, 1976
42	19	"The Italian Bird Fiasco"	Jackie Cooper	Edward J. Lakso	February 13, 1976
43	20	"Where's Houston?"	Lawrence Doheny	Don Carlos Dunaway	February 20, 1976
44	21	"Foul on the First Play"	Lou Antonio	Story by : Chas. Floyd Johnson and Dorothy J. Bailey; Teleplay by : Stephen J. Cannell	March 12, 1976
45	22	"A Bad Deal in the Valley"	Jerry London	Donald L. Gold & Lester Wm. Berke	March 19, 1976

=== Season 3 (1976–77) ===
Garner, Beery and Santos are the series stars. Corbett and Margolin are frequently recurring guests. James Luisi begins his recurring role as Lt. Chapman.

No. overall	No. in season	Title	Directed by	Written by	Original release date
46	1	"The Fourth Man"	William Wiard	Juanita Bartlett	September 24, 1976
47	2	"The Oracle Wore a Cashmere Suit"	Russ Mayberry	David Chase	October 1, 1976
48	3	"The Family Hour"	William Wiard	Gordon Dawson	October 8, 1976
49	4	"Feeding Frenzy"	Russ Mayberry	Story by : Lester Wm. Berke & Donald L. Gold; Teleplay by : Stephen J. Cannell	October 15, 1976
50	5	"Drought at Indianhead River"	Lawrence Doheny	Stephen J. Cannell	November 5, 1976
51	6	"Coulter City Wildcat"	Russ Mayberry	Don Carlos Dunaway	November 12, 1976
52	7	"So Help Me God"	Jeannot Szwarc	Juanita Bartlett	November 19, 1976
53	8	"Rattlers' Class of '63"	Meta Rosenberg	David Chase	November 26, 1976
54	9	"Return to the Thirty-Eighth Parallel"	Bruce Kessler	Walter Dallenbach	December 10, 1976
55	10	"Piece Work"	Lawrence Doheny	Juanita Bartlett	December 17, 1976
56	11	"The Trouble with Warren"	Christian I. Nyby II	Juanita Bartlett	December 24, 1976
57	12	"There's One in Every Port"	Meta Rosenberg	Stephen J. Cannell	January 7, 1977
58	13	"Sticks and Stones May Break Your Bones, but Waterbury Will Bury You"	Jerry London	David Chase	January 14, 1977
59	14	"The Trees, the Bees and T.T. Flowers: Part 1"	Jerry London	Gordon Dawson	January 21, 1977
60	15	"The Trees, the Bees and T.T. Flowers: Part 2"	Jerry London	Gordon Dawson	January 28, 1977
61	16	"The Becker Connection"	Reza Badiyi	Story by : Chas. Floyd Johnson and Ted Harris; Teleplay by : Juanita Bartlett	February 11, 1977
62	17	"Just Another Polish Wedding"	William Wiard	Stephen J. Cannell	February 18, 1977
63	18	"New Life, Old Dragons"	Jeannot Szwarc	Story by : Bernard Rollins & Leroy Robinson; Teleplay by : David C. Taylor	February 25, 1977
64	19	"To Protect and Serve: Part 1"	William Wiard	David Chase	March 11, 1977
65	20	"To Protect and Serve: Part 2"	William Wiard	David Chase	March 18, 1977
66	21	"Crack Back"	Reza Badiyi	Juanita Bartlett	March 25, 1977
67	22	"Dirty Money, Black Light"	Stuart Margolin	David C. Taylor	April 1, 1977

=== Season 4 (1977–78) ===
Garner, Beery and Santos are the series stars. Corbett, Luisi and Margolin are frequently recurring guests, though Corbett leaves the show halfway through the season. Atkins returns for one episode.

No. overall	No. in season	Title	Directed by	Written by	Original release date
68	1	"Beamer's Last Case"	Stephen J. Cannell	Story by : Booker Bradshaw & Calvin Kelly; Teleplay by : Stephen J. Cannell	September 16, 1977
69	2	"Trouble in Chapter 17"	William Wiard	Juanita Bartlett	September 23, 1977
70	3	"The Battle of Canoga Park"	Ivan Dixon	Juanita Bartlett	September 30, 1977
71	4	"Second Chance"	Reza Badiyi	Gordon Dawson	October 14, 1977
72	5	"The Dog and Pony Show"	Reza Badiyi	David Chase	October 21, 1977
73	6	"Requiem for a Funny Box"	William Wiard	Story by : Burt Prelutsky; Teleplay by : James Crocker	November 4, 1977
74	7	"Quickie Nirvana"	Meta Rosenberg	David Chase	November 11, 1977
75	8	"Irving the Explainer"	James Coburn	David Chase	November 18, 1977
76	9	"The Mayor's Committee from Deer Lick Falls"	Ivan Dixon	William R. Stratton	November 25, 1977
77	10	"Hotel of Fear"	Russ Mayberry	Juanita Bartlett	December 2, 1977
78	11	"Forced Retirement"	Alexander Singer	William R. Stratton	December 9, 1977
79	12	"The Queen of Peru"	Meta Rosenberg	David Chase	December 16, 1977
80	13	"A Deadly Maze"	William Wiard	Juanita Bartlett	December 23, 1977
81	14	"The Attractive Nuisance"	Dana Elcar	Stephen J. Cannell	January 6, 1978
82	15	"The Gang at Don's Drive-In"	Harry Falk	James Crocker	January 13, 1978
83	16	"The Paper Palace"	Richard Crenna	Juanita Bartlett	January 20, 1978
84	17	"Dwarf in a Helium Hat"	Reza Badiyi	Stephen J. Cannell and David Chase	January 27, 1978
85	18	"South by Southeast"	William Wiard	Juanita Bartlett	February 3, 1978
86	19	"The Competitive Edge"	Harry Falk	Gordon Dawson	February 10, 1978
87	20	"The Prisoner of Rosemont Hall"	Ivan Dixon	Story by : Chas. Floyd Johnson and Maryann Rea; Teleplay by : Stephen J. Cannell and David Chase	February 17, 1978
88	21	"The House on Willis Avenue"	Hy Averback	Stephen J. Cannell	February 24, 1978
89	22	"The House on Willis Avenue"	Hy Averback	Stephen J. Cannell	February 24, 1978

=== Season 5 (1978–79) ===
Garner, Beery and Santos star. Luisi and Margolin are frequently recurring guests. Bo Hopkins is a recurring guest as John Cooper for this season only.

No. overall	No. in season	Title	Directed by	Written by	Original release date
90	1	"Heartaches of a Fool"	William Wiard	Stephen J. Cannell	September 22, 1978
91	2	"Rosendahl and Gilda Stern Are Dead"	William Wiard	Juanita Bartlett	September 29, 1978
92	3	"The Jersey Bounce"	William Wiard	Story by : Stephen J. Cannell, David Chase and Juanita Bartlett; Teleplay by : David Chase	October 6, 1978
93	4	"White on White and Nearly Perfect"	Stephen J. Cannell	Stephen J. Cannell	October 20, 1978
94	5	"Kill the Messenger"	Ivan Dixon	Juanita Bartlett	October 27, 1978
95	6	"A Good Clean Bust with Sequel Rights"	William Wiard	Rudolph Borchert	November 3, 1978
96	7	"A Three-Day Affair with a Thirty-Day Escrow"	Ivan Dixon	David Chase	November 10, 1978
97	8	"The Empty Frame"	Corey Allen	Stephen J. Cannell	November 17, 1978
98	9	"Black Mirror"	Arnold Laven	David Chase	November 24, 1978
99	10	"Black Mirror"	Arnold Laven	David Chase	November 24, 1978
100	11	"A Fast Count"	Reza Badiyi	Gordon Dawson	December 1, 1978
101	12	"Local Man Eaten by Newspaper"	Meta Rosenberg	Juanita Bartlett	December 8, 1978
102	13	"With the French Heel Back, Can the Nehru Jacket Be Far Behind?"	Ivan Dixon	Rudolph Borchert	January 5, 1979
103	14	"The Battle-Ax and the Exploding Cigar"	Ivan Dixon	Story by : Mann Rubin and Michael Wagner; Teleplay by : Rogers Turrentine	January 12, 1979
104	15	"Guilt"	William Wiard	Juanita Bartlett	January 19, 1979
105	16	"The Deuce"	Bernard McEveety	Gordon Dawson	January 26, 1979
106	17	"The Man Who Saw the Alligators"	Corey Allen	David Chase	February 10, 1979
107	18	"The Return of the Black Shadow"	William Wiard	Stephen J. Cannell	February 17, 1979
108	19	"A Material Difference"	William Wiard	Rogers Turrentine	February 24, 1979
109	20	"Never Send a Boy King to Do a Man's Job"	William Wiard	Juanita Bartlett	March 3, 1979
110	21	"Never Send a Boy King to Do a Man's Job"	William Wiard	Juanita Bartlett	March 3, 1979
111	22	"A Different Drummer"	Reza Badiyi	Rudolph Borchert	April 13, 1979

=== Season 6 (1979–80) ===
Garner, Beery and Santos star. Luisi and Margolin are frequently recurring guests.

No. overall	No. in season	Title	Directed by	Written by	Original release date
112	1	"Paradise Cove"	Stephen J. Cannell	Stephen J. Cannell	September 28, 1979
113	2	"Lions, Tigers, Monkeys and Dogs"	William Wiard	Juanita Bartlett	October 12, 1979
114	3	"Lions, Tigers, Monkeys and Dogs"	William Wiard	Juanita Bartlett	October 12, 1979
115	4	"Only Rock 'n' Roll Will Never Die: Part 1"	William Wiard	David Chase	October 19, 1979
116	5	"Only Rock 'n' Roll Will Never Die: Part 2"	William Wiard	David Chase	October 26, 1979
117	6	"Love Is the Word" "Some Things You Can Tell Yourself"	John Patterson	David Chase	November 9, 1979
118	7	"Nice Guys Finish Dead"	John Patterson	Stephen J. Cannell	November 16, 1979
119	8	"The Hawaiian Headache"	William Wiard	Stephen J. Cannell	November 23, 1979
120	9	"No Fault Affair"	Corey Allen	Juanita Bartlett	November 30, 1979
121	10	"The Big Cheese"	Joseph Pevney	Shel Willens	December 7, 1979
122	11	"Just a Coupla Guys"	Ivan Dixon	David Chase	December 14, 1979
123	12	"Deadlock in Parma"	Winrich Kolbe	Story by : Donald L. Gold & Lester Wm. Berke; Teleplay by : Donald L. Gold & Lester Wm. Berke and Rudolph Borchert	January 10, 1980

=== Unproduced ===
The following four episodes were scripted and slated for production during season six. However, when Garner was forced to leave the series due to medical issues, the series was shut down and these episodes were never filmed.

· "Happy Father's Day" by Mark Griffiths
· "Some People Are Trouble" by Shel Willens
· "Never Trust a Boxx Boy" by Stephen J. Cannell
· "What Do You Want From Us?" by Juanita Bartlett

== CBS TV movies ==
No.	Title	Directed by	Written by	Original release date
1	"I Still Love L.A."	James Whitmore Jr.	Juanita Bartlett	November 27, 1994
In the midst of the 1992 Los Angeles riots, Jim Rockford investigates a carjacking that led to murder.
2	"A Blessing in Disguise"	Jeannot Szwarc	Stephen J. Cannell	May 14, 1995
Jim Rockford helps an actress whose movie is being boycotted by Angel's church.
3	"If the Frame Fits..."	Jeannot Szwarc	Juanita Bartlett	January 14, 1996
Jim Rockford works to clear his name in the murder of a P.I. with a bad reputation.
4	"Godfather Knows Best"	Tony Wharmby	David Chase	February 18, 1996
Lt. Becker's drifter son - whose godfather happens to be Jim Rockford - gets mixed up in the murder of a fashion model.
5	"Friends and Foul Play"	Stuart Margolin	Stephen J. Cannell	April 25, 1996
Jim Rockford investigates the murders of his friend Babs and her son by taking a criminal behavioral class.
6	"Punishment and Crime"	David Chase	David Chase	September 18, 1996
Jim Rockford renews ties with Megan Dougherty, whose brother is involved with Russian mobsters.
7	"Murder and Misdemeanors"	Tony Wharmby	Juanita Bartlett	November 21, 1997
Jim Rockford struggles to deal with both a prostitute complaining about two Vice cops and his old cellmate's terminal illness.
8	"If It Bleeds, It Leads"	Stuart Margolin	Story by : Stephen J. Cannell & Juanita Bartlett; Teleplay by : Reuben Leder	April 20, 1999
Jim Rockford helps his old friend Rita Capkovic when her husband is suspected of being the "Westside Rapist".

== Writers ==
- Stephen J. Cannell and Roy Huggins a.k.a. John Thomas James

They created the Rockford files together and wrote many episodes together and separately.

- Robert Hamner
- Gloryette Clark
- Edward J. Lakso
- Juanita Bartlett
- Gordon Dawson
- David Chase
- David C. Taylor
- Rudolph Borchert
- Shel Willens
- Rogers Turrentine
- James Crocker
- William R. Stratton
- Charles Sailor
- Eric Kaldor

== Directors ==
- William Wiard

directed 26 episodes

- Lawrence Doheny

directed 12 episodes

- Ivan Dixon

Directed 8 episodes

- Jerry London

Directed 8 episodes

- Reza Badiyi

Directed 7 episodes

- Russ Mayberry

Directed 7 episodes

- Meta Rosenberg

Directed 6 episodes

- Jackie Cooper

Directed 5 episodes

- Lou Antonio

Directed 3 episodes

- Corey Allen

Directed 3 episodes

- Stephen J. Cannell

Directed 3 episodes

- John Patterson

Directed 2 episodes

- Jeannot Szwarc

Directed 2 episodes

- Vincent McEveety

Directed 2 episodes

- Stuart Margolin (Angel Martin)

Directed 2 episodes

- Joseph Pevney

Directed 1 episode

- Michael Schultz

Directed 1 episode

- Bernhard Kowalski

Directed 1 episode

- Alex Grasshoff

Directed 1 episode

- Charles S. Dubin

Directed 1 episode

- Winrich Kolbe

Directed 1 episode

- James Coburn

Directed 1 episode

- James Garner

Directed 1 episode

- Richard Crenna

Directed 1 episode
