= Nichols (TV series) =

American Western television series

- James Garner in title card screenshot
- Also known as: James Garner as Nichols
- Genre: Western
- Created by: Frank Pierson
- Written by: Juanita Bartlett; Gene L. Coon; Jack Curtis; Theodore J. Flicker; Robert Foster; Bud Freeman; Marion Hargrove; James L. Henderson; Buck Houghton; George Kirgo; Ken Kolb; Benjamin Masselink; Frank Pierson; Sam Roeca; Frank Telford; Shimon Wincelberg; William Wood
- Directed by: John Badham; Paul Bogart; Ivan Dixon; Danny Haller; Jeremy Kagan; Gerd Oswald; Frank Pierson; Peter Tewksbury; William Wiard
- Starring: James Garner; Margot Kidder; Stuart Margolin; Alice Ghostley
- Composer: Bernardo Segall
- Country of origin: United States
- Original language: English
- No. of seasons: 1
- No. of episodes: 24

Production
- Executive producer: Meta Rosenberg
- Producer: Frank Pierson
- Cinematography: Lamar Boren
- Running time: 48-50 minutes
- Production company: Warner Bros. Television

Original release
- Network: NBC
- Release: September 16, 1971 – March 14, 1972

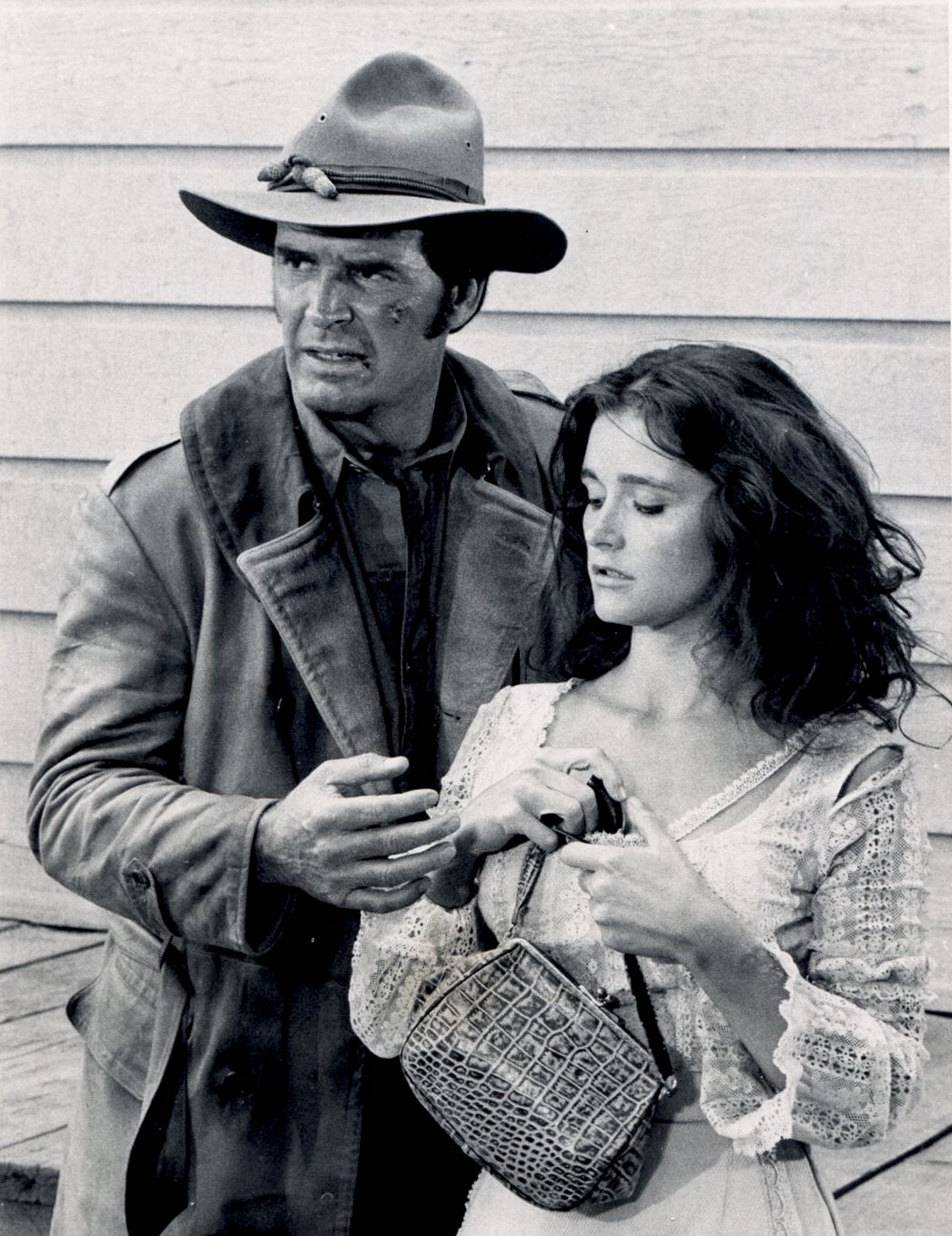
James Garner and Margot Kidder

Nichols (also known as James Garner as Nichols) is a Western television series starring James Garner. It was first broadcast in the United States on NBC during the 1971–72 season. Set in the fictional town of Nichols, Arizona, Nichols differed from traditional Western series. The time period was 1914, at the beginning of the motorized era and well after the decline of the "Old West". The main character, a sheriff also named Nichols, rode on a motorcycle and in an automobile rather than on the traditional horse. Nichols did not carry a firearm and was generally opposed to the use of violence to solve problems, preferring other means. Margot Kidder played his love interest, a barmaid named Ruth.

Although Nichols' first name was never spoken aloud, his army induction papers, seen in the opening moments of the pilot episode, gave "Frank" as his first name (also the first name of series creator Frank Pierson).

== Premise ==
After 18 years in the army, Nichols decides to quit after the introduction of a new, deadlier type of machine gun. He comes back to the town founded by his family to learn that it has been taken over by another family, the Ketchams. At the end of the pilot episode, matriarch Ma Ketcham (Neva Patterson) blackmails Nichols into serving as the town sheriff, a position which carries little actual authority but considerable danger. Nichols' personal concern is not usually law enforcement but rather finding a way to get rich with very little effort.

Ma Ketcham's oldest son, known simply as "Ketcham" and played by John Beck, is constantly butting heads with Nichols. The role of Ketcham was greatly reduced after the first few episodes. Toward the end of the first season, Beck, still a series regular, appeared in two episodes in the completely unrelated role of Orv, who gets Nichols into trouble with his schemes. In effect, Beck was playing a double role, but only Nichols and Mitch mention his resemblance to Ketcham in the first of the two episodes.

Mitch Mitchell, played by Stuart Margolin (who would later team with Garner again on The Rockford Files and Bret Maverick). is assigned to be Nichols' deputy, either in spite of or because he is none too bright, none too honest and something of a bully. Nichols' girlfriend Ruth (Margot Kidder), whom he meets after his return to town, is a barmaid at Salter's Hotel.

== Behind-the-scenes ==
Nichols marked the first time since Maverick that Garner had worked with Warner Bros. After suing Warner over Maverick, Garner was banned from the lot by Jack Warner.

Garner wore three different hats in the main with his costumes during the course of the series: a cavalry hat, a striped cap for riding motorcycles, and finally an approximate duplicate of his black cowboy Maverick hat. One episode, "Fight of the Century," was more or less a remake of the second half of the Maverick episode "Stampede," with Garner trying to persuade a genial animal-loving giant into fighting a professional in a boxing match, then winding up having to replace the reluctant giant and fight the boxer himself. The primary difference between the two fights was that Garner, now more than a dozen years older, wore a nightshirt while boxing in the Nichols version.

The series did not do well in the ratings and was quickly retitled James Garner as Nichols in October 1971 to capitalize on the star's popularity. The low ratings also resulted in the decision by the program's producers to kill off the title character in the final episode to retool the series. The unarmed Nichols was shot down, to be avenged by his identical twin brother, Jim Nichols (also portrayed by Garner), who arrived in town with precisely the same haircut and sideburns but wearing a vigorous mustache. Jim administered justice in a somewhat more conventional (and it was hoped, popular) Western fashion, was offered the job of sheriff by Ma Ketcham, then rode out of town on a motorcycle, saying he expected he might come back sometime. This solution made recasting and retitling the program unnecessary while allowing for considerable changes, and leaving the door open for a second season. However this episode proved to be the final one; before it aired NBC cancelled the series, rerunning the earlier episodes in the summer of 1972. (One previously pre-empted episode featuring the original Nichols was also run in the summer.) Garner offered an alternate version in his Archive of American Television interview, stating that once the series was canceled, Garner insisted on killing the lead character in the series' last episode so that there could never be a revival.

When interviewed for Emmy TV Legends, Garner indicated that Nichols was one of his favorite roles. In the interview he indicated that the failure of the show was due to a presentation of the show to executives at Chevrolet. The car company had originally offered to sponsor the show in full but, after the screening of the pilot, a wife of one of the executives complained that Nichols was not Maverick, the popular series that Garner starred in from 1957 to 1961. As a result, Chevrolet indicated they would only sponsor half the show forcing Garner, Warner and NBC to hunt for other sponsors in a very competitive market.

Garner said that, despite the low ratings of the series, Nichols had better ratings than any show launched the following season on NBC and that the ratings for the series steadily improved which gave Garner, Warner and his producers hope that the show would be renewed.

Garner discovered Stuart Margolin, his frequent co-star on this series and The Rockford Files, while watching an episode of the anthology comedy series Love, American Style. He also promoted his agent Meta Rosenberg to the role of producer for the series. She would continue to work as a producer for Garner's The Rockford Files as well. Juanita Bartlett, frequent writer for The Rockford Files and screenplay writer of the Garner TV-movie The New Maverick, also began her career on Nichols.

While the motion picture The Americanization of Emily (1963), written by Paddy Chayefsky, remained Garner's favorite of his own work, he often noted that Nichols was his favorite of his several television series.

== Cast ==
- James Garner as Frank Nichols/Jim Nichols
- Margot Kidder as Ruth
- Neva Patterson as Sara "Ma" Ketcham
- John Beck as Ketcham/Orv
- Stuart Margolin as Deputy Sheriff Mitch Mitchell

Recurring characters:

- John Harding as Salter, owner of Salter's Bar (10 episodes)
- James Lee Reeves as Fearless (8 episodes)
- Luis Delgado as Luis (7 episodes, 3 uncredited)
- M. Emmet Walsh as Gabe McCutcheon (6 episodes)
- Barbara Collentine as Charlotte, the telegraph operator (6 episodes)
- Stefan Gierasch as Doc Bernstein (5 episodes)
- Richard Bull as Thatcher (5 episodes)
- James Beach as Bob Sanders (4 episodes)
- William Christopher as Niles (4 episodes)
- William Paterson as Perkins, the town banker (4 episodes)
- Paul Hampton as Johnson, a con artist and thief (3 episodes)
- Alice Ghostley as Bertha, owner of a rival tavern to Salter's (2 episodes)

== Episodes ==
No. in season	Title	Directed by	Written by	Original release date
1	"Nichols"	Frank R. Pierson	Frank R. Pierson	September 16, 1971
Lt. Nichols (James Garner) resigns his commission from the U.S. Cavalry, after seeing a demonstration of the new Browning machine gun, and returns to his hometown of Nichols, Arizona, from which he's been away for 18 years, only to learn that everything his family had is gone.
2	"The Siege"	Paul Bogart	Shimon Wincelberg	September 23, 1971
Col. Diego Alcazar, a Mexican Bandito (Ricardo Montalban) comes to town, with his revolutionaries, and holds the town (and Ma Ketchum personally) hostage until he finishes his unscheduled appointment with the Dentist.
3	"The Indian Giver"	Frank R. Pierson	Theodore J. Flicker	September 30, 1971
Flying Fox, a Princeton educated Apache Indian (Michael Tolan), comes to town with a U.S. Federal Land Grant for the Ketchum Ranch.
4	"Paper Badge"	Paul Bogart	William Wood	October 7, 1971
Mitch (Stuart Margolin) breaks his leg and Ma Ketcham forces Nichols to deputize Ketcham (John Beck) despite objections from both Nichols and Ketcham. When Nichols leaves town, to do business in Yuma, Ketcham is left in charge with disastrous results. Going from incompetent to incorrigible, he first arrests an assault victim (Hoke Howell) then begins enforcing the City Ordinances to the extreme (and arresting half the town in the process). When Nichols returns, he discovers the townsfolk are in hiding and a pair of strangers renting his room. Ma Ketcham asks Nichols to fire Ketcham, but Ketcham won't go (as he likes the job too much). When Ruth (Margot Kidder) realizes that the two strangers are actually bank robbers, Nichols hatches a plan to capture them and get Ketcham to quit.
5	"Gulley vs Hansen"	Frank R. Pierson	Story by : Frank R. Pierson; Teleplay by : Shimon Wincelberg	October 14, 1971
6	"Deer Crossing"	William Wiard	Story by : Frank R. Pierson; Teleplay by : Shimon Wincelberg	October 21, 1971
7	"The Specialists"	Frank R. Pierson	George Kirgo	October 28, 1971
8	"Peanuts and Crackerjacks"	Peter Tewksbury	Bud Freeman	November 4, 1971
9	"Ketcham Power"	Peter Tewksbury	Gene Coon	November 11, 1971
10	"Bertha"	Robert Butler	Juanita Bartlett	November 18, 1971
11	"The One Eyed Mule's Time Has Come"	Gerd Oswald	Jack Curtis	November 22, 1971
12	"Where Did Everybody Go?"	Frank R. Pierson	Buck Houghton	November 30, 1971
13	"Away the Rolling River"	Ivan Dixon	Ken Kolb and Juanita Bartlett	December 7, 1971
14	"The Marrying Fool"	Gerald Mayer	Benjamin Masselink	December 28, 1971
15	"Eddie Joe"	John Badham	Story by : Robert van Scoyk; Teleplay by : Frank R. Pierson & William Wood	January 4, 1972
16	"Zachariah"	Ivan Dixon	Juanita Bartlett	January 11, 1972
17	"The Unholy Alliance"	John Badham	Benjamin Masselink	January 18, 1972
18	"Sleight of Hand"	Ivan Dixon	Story by : Frank Telford; Teleplay by : Juanita Bartlett and Frank Telford	February 1, 1972
19	"Wings of an Angel"	Ivan Dixon	Robert Foster and Buck Houghton	February 8, 1972
20	"About Jesse James" a.k.a. "Man Of The Cloth"	William Wiard	James L Henderson and Sam Roeca	February 15, 1972
21	"Fight of the Century"	William Wiard	Story by : Gilbert Ralston; Teleplay by : Marion Hargrove and Gilbert Ralston	February 22, 1972
22	"Man's Best Enemy"	Tony Leader	Bud Freeman	February 29, 1972
23	"Wonder Fizz Flies Again"	Frank R. Pierson	Robert Foster	March 7, 1972
24	"All in the Family"	Jeremy Kagan	Story by : Frank R. Pierson; Teleplay by : Juanita Bartlett	March 14, 1972

* The 10th episode titled "Bertha" with guest star Alice Ghostley was telecast on NBC on November 18, 1971, instead of the originally scheduled episode "Away the Rolling River." "Bertha" was the last episode in the program's Thursday time slot.

== Home media ==
On September 10, 2013, Warner Bros. released Nichols: The Complete Series on DVD in Region 1 via their Warner Archive Collection. This is a manufacture-on-demand release, available exclusively in the US and only through Warner's online store.

== Syndication ==
Nichols was broadcast on American Forces Network Television in Germany in the early 1980s. "Nichols" was also broadcast in Iran, specifically in Isfahan, during 1978. "Nichols" is currently broadcast on the GetTV network.
