= Richie Brockelman, Private Eye =

- Genre: Crime drama
- Created by: Stephen J. Cannell; Steven Bochco
- Starring: Dennis Dugan
- Country of origin: United States
- Original language: English
- No. of seasons: 1
- No. of episodes: 5 (and 1 pilot)

Production
- Executive producers: Stephen J. Cannell; Steven Bochco

Original release
- Network: NBC
- Release: March 17 – April 14, 1978

Richie Brockelman, Private Eye is an American detective drama that was broadcast on NBC for five episodes in March and April 1978, with Dennis Dugan in the starring role. The Rockford Files was used to launch the series via character crossover in a 2-hour episode at the end of the 1977–78 season.

== Premise ==
The hour-long series focused on Richie Brockelman, a 22-year-old, college-educated private investigator with his own agency in Los Angeles, California. (Dugan was actually 31 at the time the series was made.) Also seen on the show were Barbara Bosson as Brockleman's secretary Sharon, Robert Hogan as Brockleman's police contact Sgt. Ted Coopersmith. John Randolph played Richie's father in a single episode of the series. (The role of Richie's father was initially played by Norman Fell in the 2-hour pilot, and would be later played by Harold Gould on a crossover episode with The Rockford Files.)

Brockleman was consistently underestimated due to his extremely youthful, clean-cut looks, which were coupled with an innocent, nerdy but friendly and often overly polite demeanor. In actuality, Brockleman was a sharp, savvy operator, and people's mistaken impression of him as a callow, naive youngster was something he used to his advantage. Brockleman's main method in solving his cases was his ability to talk his way into or out of any situation—though not always completely successfully. Usually there was a woman involved in the plot that was in some kind of distress; in the end, Brockleman would solve the case, but would not end up with her.

Initially filmed as a pilot for a TV series in 1976 titled "Richie Brockelman: The Missing 24 Hours" it was not picked up by NBC. Stephen J. Cannell reworked the character into a two-hour episode of The Rockford Files titled "The House on Willis Avenue" as the last new episode of the 1977–78 season. Rockford and Brockelman join forces to solve the murder of a veteran PI who taught both of them the ropes. It was followed by a limited run of Richie Brockelman, Private Eye. NBC instantly picked up the series as a compensation by the producers for the cancellation of an aborted sitcom known as Off the Wall. Brockelman later appeared in another two-part episode of The Rockford Files, "Never Send a Boy King to Do a Man's Job", at the end of the 1978–79 season.

The theme song, "School's Out," was written by Mike Post, Pete Carpenter, Herb Pederson and Stephen Geyer. An extended version of the song from Mike Post's Television Theme Songs appeared on iTunes and amazon.com for download. The song's performers were credited as Stephen Geyer & Herb Pedersen and Mike Post & Pete Carpenter.

== Cast ==
- Dennis Dugan as Richie Brockelman
- Robert Hogan as Sgt. Ted Coopersmith
- Barbara Bosson as Sharon Deterson
- Norman Fell as Mr. Brockelman (Pilot)
- John Randolph as Mr. Brockelman (Series)

== Cancellation ==
After its launch from The Rockford Files, Richie Brockelman, Private Eye initially performed well for NBC; however, after the five episodes were broadcast, the ratings were not strong enough for the network to order a full season of new episodes for the 1978–79 season. NBC was looking for hit shows at the time and Richie Brockelman needed to be scheduled as a follow-up after a strong lead-in, which the network did not have at the time.

The series was broadcast in England on ITV Anglia television during the summer of 1978. In the spring of 1979, a second two-hour episode of The Rockford Files was produced that ended the show.

When The Rockford Files went into syndication in the 1980s, the five episodes of "Richie Brockelman" were included as part of the package. Two of the episodes were later re-edited for syndication as a 90-minute Universal TV movie titled The Diary of Richie Brockelman.

== Episodes ==
=== Pilot (1976) ===
Title	Directed by	Written by	Original release date
"Richie Brockelman: The Missing 24 Hours"	Hy Averback	Steven Bochco & Stephen J. Cannell	October 27, 1976
90-minute pilot, NBC: A young private detective (Richie Brockelman) is hired by an amnesia victim. She does not know why a gunman is after her, yet thinks that she is involved in a murder. Barbara Bosson appears as Richie's secretary Sharon, a role she will continue to play in the series. Richie's parents are here played by Norman Fell and Helen Page Camp; they will subsequently be played by different actors in later stories. Guest stars: Sharon Gless, Suzanne Pleshette, Lloyd Bochner, William Windom

=== Season 1 (1978) ===
No.	Title	Directed by	Written by	Original release date
1	"The Framing of Perfect Sydney"	Arnold Laven	Michael Kozoll	March 17, 1978
Richie tries to clear his brother, who has been accused of embezzling one million dollars in corporate funds. Guest star: David Spielberg (Sydney Brockelman)
2	"Junk It to Me Baby"	Ivan Dixon	Robert E. Swanson	March 24, 1978
Two thugs come after Richie, after he outbids them on a beat-up sedan at an auction he was hired to go to.
3	"A Title on the Door and a Carpet on the Floor"	Arnold Laven	Story by : Stephen J. Cannell & Steven Bochco; Teleplay by : Steven Bochco	March 31, 1978
Soon after the husband of a former client of Richie's dies, he gets a job offer from a big-time detective agency. Then he learns the only reason they hired him was to pull him off a case of murder and industrial espionage that the agency was involved in. Guest stars: Carol Lynley, Charles Siebert, Rene Auberjonois, Jim McKrell
4	"A Pigeon Ripe for Plucking"	Ivan Dixon	Peter S. Fischer	April 7, 1978
Richie goes to Las Vegas to help an old fraternity brother who has a couple of con artists after him due to some gambling debts.
5	"Escape from Cain Abel"	David Moessinger	Peter S. Fischer	April 14, 1978
Richie brings the victim of an auto accident to the hospital, then goes to get the victim's wife. She claims he died in an airplane crash eleven days ago. When he goes back to the hospital, none of the doctors or nurses act like they even recognize Richie. When the wife disappears the following day, he joins up with her daughter to figure out what's going on. Guest stars: Richard Devon, Joanna Frank, Vivi Janiss

== Appearances on The Rockford Files ==
The character of "Richie Brockelman" appeared on two episodes of The Rockford Files; both episodes were two hours long:

- "The House on Willis Avenue" (season four, episodes 21 & 22; original airdate February 24, 1978).

When a fellow private investigator is killed on the Ventura Freeway, Jim Rockford and Richie Brockelman team up to find out if it really was an accident. Broadcast about a year-and-a-half after "The Missing 24 Hours", this episode re-introduced the Richie Brockelman character. It also introduced Richie's police contact Sgt. Ted Coopersmith, who was not seen or mentioned in "The Missing 24 Hours". The character of Sharon (Richie's secretary) who was seen in "The Missing 24 Hours" as well as in the subsequent series, is referenced here but not seen.

While working within The Rockford Files continuity, this episode was used as a set-up for the Brockelman series, which started airing (in The Rockford Files time slot) a few weeks after this episode aired. In this episode, it is established that Richie Brockleman is 22 years old.

- "Never Send a Boy King to Do a Man's Job" (season five, episodes 20 & 21; original airdate March 3, 1979).

Aired about a year after the series had ended. Harold Gould and Kim Hunter play Richie's parents. The elder Mr. Brockelman gets cheated out of his business and Richie enlists Rockford to help him run a con on the men who cheated his father. Sharon and Sgt. Coopersmith are not seen in this episode.
