= Grambling's White Tiger =

1981 TV movie directed by Georg Stanford Brown

- Based on: My Little Brother's Coming Tomorrow by Bruce Bahrenburg
- Written by: William A. Attaway
- Directed by: Georg Stanford Brown
- Starring: Bruce Jenner; Dennis Haysbert; Bill Overton; Deborah Pratt; Byron Stewart; Ray Vitte; LeVar Burton; Harry Belafonte
- Music by: John D'Andrea; Michael Lloyd

Production
- Executive producers: Max A. Keller; George Wallach
- Producers: Bert Gold; Micheline H. Keller
- Cinematography: Joseph M. Wilcots
- Editor: David Rosenbloom
- Production company: Inter Planetary Pictures

Original release
- Network: NBC
- Release: October 4, 1981

Grambling's White Tiger (also released as White Tiger in Europe) is a 1981 TV movie about the true story of Jim Gregory, played by Bruce Jenner, the first white quarterback of the Grambling Tigers at Grambling College, a historically black college, in 1968. The movie covers Gregory's freshman year. Harry Belafonte stars as coach Eddie Robinson and LeVar Burton (already famous from Roots and later to be known for Reading Rainbow and Star Trek: The Next Generation) appears as Charles 'Tank' Smith, the first friend Jim Gregory makes on the team. The film is directed by Georg Stanford Brown.

== Plot ==
The movie starts with the recruitment of Gregory as a talented recruit, keen to have the opportunity to go to a school with real NFL credentials, who also opens avenues for funding and recognition for the college. The story deals with issues of race, culture and integration at a critical time in America's history. It ends with grudging acceptance and a positive message — although Gregory only actually plays for less than a minute in the final game of the team's division winning season.

== Outside the USA ==
The movie has enjoyed popularity outside the USA under different titles, usually some version of simply White Tiger. This is because Grambling would be unknown to other audiences and would not be understood in the title. It has been released in Finland under the names Team Tiger and White Tiger. It is particularly well known in Germany under the title Der Kampf der weißen Tiger (which translates as, The Struggle of The White Tiger). Movies featuring American Football have a very specific following in Germany.

All the releases are identical to the US release with various different covers for Video and DVD releases.

== Production ==
Director: Georg Stanford Brown (also from Roots)

Writers: William A. Attaway; based on a book called My Little Brother's Coming Tomorrow by Bruce Bahrenburg

== Cast ==
- Bruce Jenner as Jim Gregory
- Dennis Haysbert as James "Shack" Harris
- Bill Overton as "Slick"
- Deborah Pratt as Jennifer
- Byron Stewart as "Sandman"
- Ray Vitte as "Rags"
- LeVar Burton as Charles "Tank" Smith
- Harry Belafonte as Coach Eddie Robinson
- Vance Davis as Coach Porter
- Fred Pinkard as Dr. Ford
- Daniel Joseph Bernard as Gibbons
- Mark Chavis as Chris
- Betsy Corley as Coed Clerk
- Gilbert Culpepper as Holmes
- Rick Frederick as Male Clerk
- Marlene Leeper as Janey
- Alex Marshall as Wiley Coach
- Herb Nelson as "Slob"
- Glarence Odum as Potts
- Robert Parham as J.J. Johnson
- Anita Parrott as Mrs. Johnson
- John K. Price as Man At Counter
- Dorsey R. Richard as "Rhino"
- Katie Robinson as Waitress
- Tammy L. Staten as Ruby
- John Tellis as Guard
- Michael Jerome Williams as "Pow Wow" Samuels

== Release ==
The film was released on DVD on June 3, 1998.

== See also ==
- List of American football films
