= Ray Vitte =

American actor (1949–1983)

- Born: November 20, 1949; New York City, New York, U.S.
- Died: February 20, 1983 (aged 33); Los Angeles, California, U.S.
- Occupation: Actor
- Years active: 1973–1982

Raymond Vitte (November 20, 1949 – February 20, 1983) was an American actor who starred mostly in comedy and drama films in the 1970s and early 1980s. He made numerous guest appearances on television shows and was a cast member of the show Doc in 1976.

Vitte, who had been fevered for days and acting strangely for hours in his Los Angeles home, died in 1983 following a scuffle with two Los Angeles Police Department officers who were transporting Vitte to a nearby hospital for a psychiatric evaluation.

== Filmography ==
Year	Title	Role	Notes
1973	Kojak	Prisoner	In episode "Requiem for a Cop" (Season 1, ep. #6)
1974	Airport 1975	Passenger	Uncredited
1974	Police Woman	Ron Daniels	In episode "Smack" (Season 1, ep. #11)
1974	Sanford and Son	Lewis	In episode "Sanford and Niece" (Season 4, ep. #9)
1974	Cannon	Joe	In episode "The Exchange" (Season 4, ep. #6)
1974–1975	That's My Mama	Freddie Hampton	7 episodes
1975	America, You're On	Carlyle Green II	TV movie
1975	Joe Forrester (TV series)	Ethan Gates	In episode "Stake Out" (series pilot)
1975	Harry O	Richie Harris / Bama	2 episodes
1975	Police Story	Slow Pony / Con / Alvin Lewis	3 episodes
1975	Sky Heist	Deputy Rick Busby	TV movie
1976	Car Wash	Geronimo	
1976	Doc	Woody Henderson	7 episodes
1976	Father O Father (TV movie)	Uncredited role	
1977	Charlie's Angels	Sharp	in episode "Terror on Ward One" (Season 1, episode #18)
1977	What's Happening	Gene / Dean	3 episodes
1978	Thank God It's Friday	Bobby Speed	
1978	Mother, Jugs & Speed	Mother	TV short
1978	Up in Smoke	The Band: Bass - James	
1978–1979	David Cassidy: Man Undercover	Officer T.J. Epps	5 episodes
1979	A Force of One	Newton	
1979	The Man in the Santa Claus Suit	Eddie	
1980	9 to 5	Eddie	
1980	Cruising	Uncredited role	
1980	Heart Beat	Undercover Agent	
1981	Gimme a Break!	Ken	in episode "A Good Man is Hard to Find" (Season 1, episode #2)
1981	Grambling's White Tiger	Rags	TV movie
1981	Quincy M.E.	Man	in episode "Vigil of Fear" (Season 6, episode #18)
1982	The Powers of Matthew Star	Dr. Baker	in episode "The Fugitive" (Season 1, episode #12)
1982	The Quest	Cody Johnson	9 episodes (final appearance)

== Death ==
In February 1983, police were called to Vitte's home in Studio City by neighbors claiming that a man had been making "religious shoutings laced with references to Muhammad" for more than 12 hours". Vitte allegedly lunged at one of the officers who subsequently struck him with a baton. Vitte attempted to run away, but was struck again by officers who also used tear gas with no effect. After Vitte ran away again, he fell down at the side of a swimming pool where officers handcuffed him and placed him into a squad car. En route to a hospital for a mental evaluation, the officers noticed Vitte had stopped breathing. He was pronounced dead at the hospital.

A group including singer Donna Summer and the president of the Beverly Hills-Hollywood chapter of the NAACP protested Vitte's death in a news conference, with Summer saying "...a man who's basically minding his own business in his own home, who happens to be creating a disturbance somehow, is now dead because his neighbors called the police".

A spokesman for the coroner's office said preliminary results of an autopsy showed "superficial injuries consistent with a struggle" but which were "not responsible for his death". According to the coroner's report, Vitte died of complications from sickle cell disease.
