= Barbara Bosson =

American actress (1939–2023)

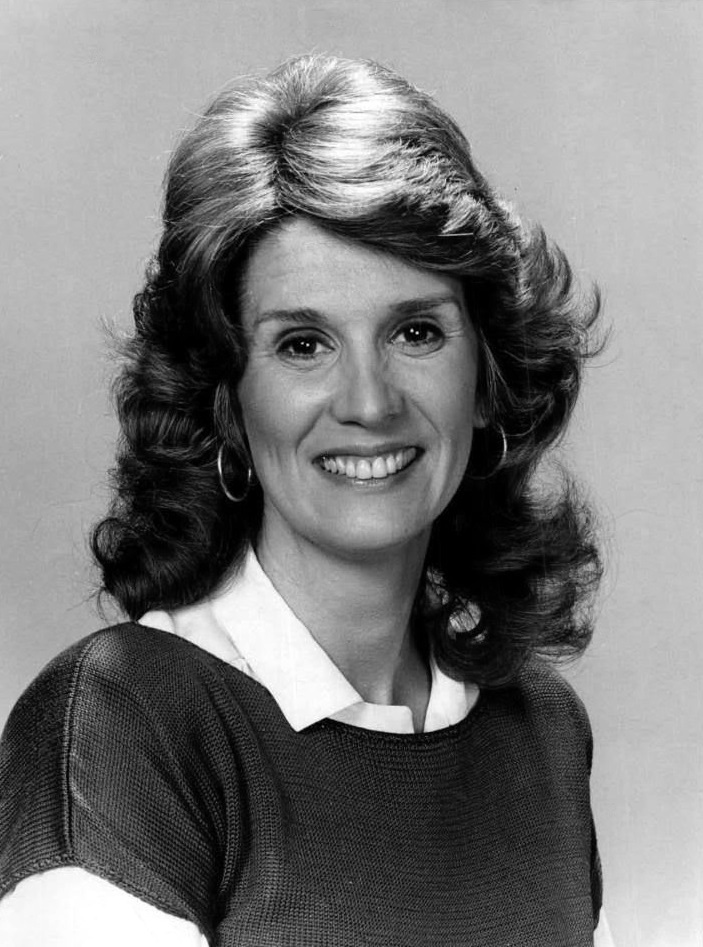
- Bosson in 1985
- Born: November 1, 1939; Charleroi, Pennsylvania, U.S.
- Died: February 18, 2023 (aged 83); Los Angeles, California, U.S.
- Occupation: Actress
- Years active: 1967–1998
- Known for: Hill Street Blues
- Spouse: Steven Bochco (m. 1970; div. 1997)
- Children: 2, including Jesse Bochco

Barbara Bosson (November 1, 1939 – February 18, 2023) was an American actress and writer. She is best known for her roles in the television series Hill Street Blues (1981–1986) and Murder One (1995–1997), for both of which she received six Primetime Emmy Award nominations.

== Early life ==
Bosson was born in Charleroi, Pennsylvania, to a tennis coach father, and raised in the nearby coal-mining town of Belle Vernon. She and her family moved to Florida, and she graduated from Boca Ciega High School in Gulfport in 1957. She later moved to New York and worked as a secretary for the American Conservatory Theater and as a Playboy Bunny while taking acting classes with Herbert Berghof and Milton Katselas. When she was 26 years old, Bosson was enrolled at Carnegie Mellon University.

== Career ==
Bosson made her screen debut with a minor part in the 1968 crime thriller film Bullitt. During the 1970s, Bosson made guest appearances on many series, including Mannix, Emergency!, Ironside and McMillan & Wife. She was a member of the improvisation group The Committee, appearing in the comedy series The Smothers Brothers Comedy Hour from 1968 to 1969, and the comedy film Where It's At. In 1978 she was regular cast member in the short-lived detective drama series, Richie Brockelman, Private Eye. She also had supporting roles in films Mame (1974), Capricorn One (1978), and The Last Starfighter (1984).

Bosson starred as Fay Furillo in the NBC police drama series Hill Street Blues during the series' first six seasons from 1981 to 1986. She received five Primetime Emmy Awards nominations for Outstanding Supporting Actress in a Drama Series for her performance in series. Following the fifth season, Bochco was fired by MTM Enterprises after he refused to cut costs and pare storylines. Bosson soon would exit Hill Street Blues as well, quitting after filming three episodes for season six. She later guest-starred on L.A. Law, Mike Hammer, Private Eye, Hotel and Murder, She Wrote.

From 1987 to 1989, Bosson was regular cast member in the ABC comedy-drama series, Hooperman. In 1990 she starred in the short-lived ABC musical procedural Cop Rock, TV Guide Magazine ranked it #8 on its List of the 50 Worst TV Shows of All Time list in 2002. She later had a recurring role in the legal drama Civil Wars and guest-starred on Star Trek: Deep Space Nine (in episode "Rivals" as Roana), and Lois & Clark: The New Adventures of Superman. From 1995 to 1997, Bosson starred as tough prosecutor Miriam Grasso in the ABC legal drama series, Murder One, which earned her an additional Emmy Award nomination.

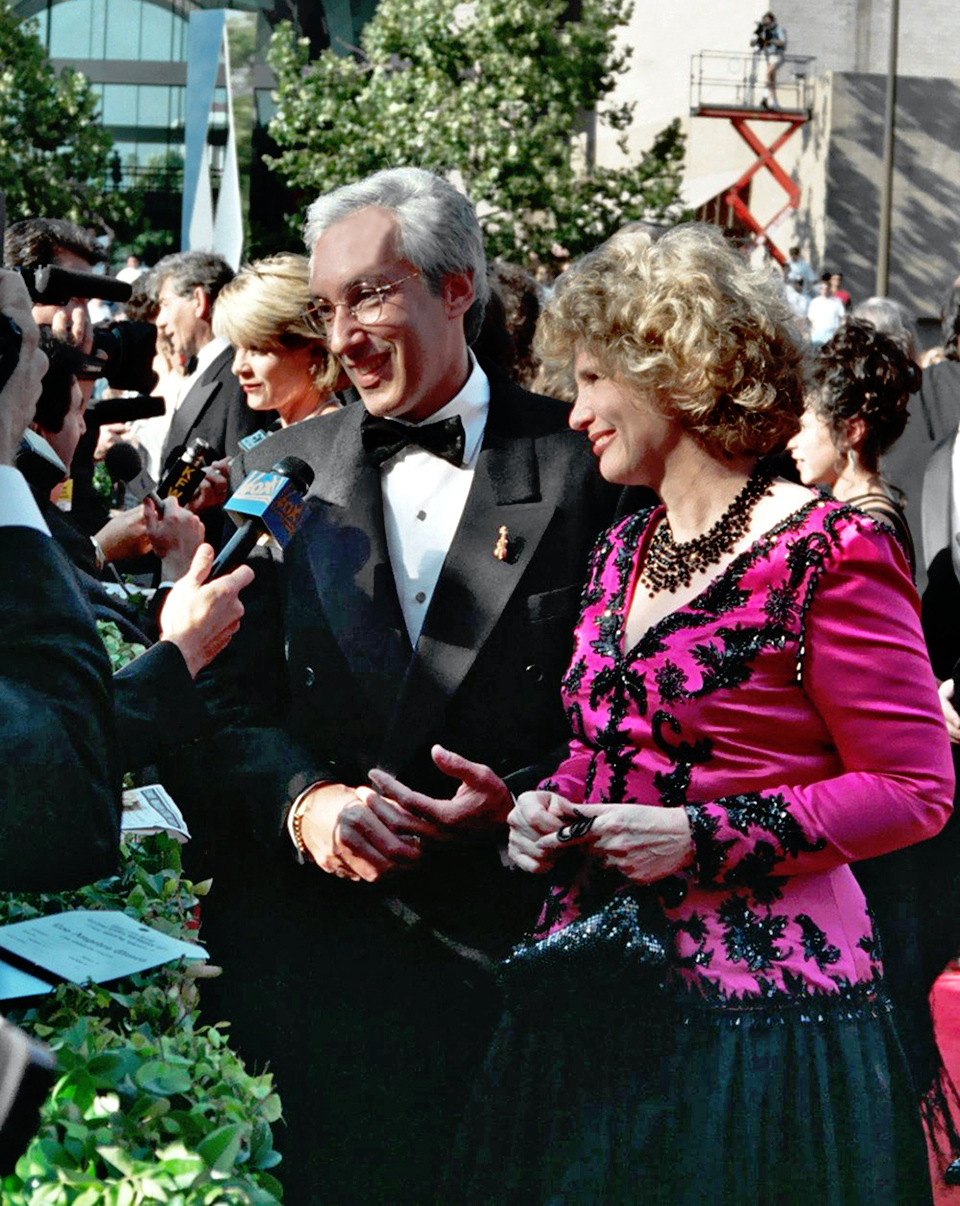
Steven Bochco and Bosson in 1994

== Personal life and death ==
In 1970, Bosson married writer-producer Steven Bochco, who created several of the series in which she starred, including Hill Street Blues, L.A. Law, Murder One, and Cop Rock. The couple had two children before divorcing in 1997.

Bosson died in Los Angeles on February 18, 2023, at the age of 83.

== Filmography ==
=== Film ===
Year	Title	Role	Notes
1968	Bullitt	Nurse	Uncredited
1969	The Love God?	Minor	Uncredited
1969	Where It's At	The Committee	
1969	A Session with the Committee	The Committee	Also writer
1974	Mame	Emily	
1978	Capricorn One	Alva Leacock	
1978	Operating Room	Unknown	Television movie
1983	Imps*	Pam	
1984	Calendar Girl Murders	Nancy	Television movie
1984	The Last Starfighter	Jane Rogan	
1985	Hostage Flight	Roberta Spooner	Television movie
1986	The Education of Allison Tate	Lisa Stubbs	
1989	Little Sweetheart	Mrs. Davies	
1998	Scattering Dad		Writer, Television movie

=== Television ===
Year	Title	Role	Notes
1969	Mannix	Miss Riley	S3-Episode 05: "A Question of Midnight"
1972	Longstreet	Unknown	Episode: "The Sound of Money Talking"
1972	Emergency!	Mrs. Collins	Episode: "Saddled"
1972	Alias Smith and Jones	Mrs. Schwedes	Episode: "The Ten Days That Shook Kid Curry"
1973	Griff	Zena	Episode: "Countdown to Terror"
1974	McMillan & Wife	Della Wheatley	Episode: "Downshift to Danger"
1975	Sunshine	Mrs. Cox	Episode: "Father Nature"
1976	McMillan & Wife	Nurse Roz Beach	Episode: "The Deadly Cure"
1976	Delvecchio	Nancy Travis	Episode: "Board of Rights"
1978	Richie Brockelman, Private Eye	Sharon Diederson	6 episodes
1981–1985	Hill Street Blues	Fay Furillo	100 episodes Nominated—Primetime Emmy Award for Outstanding Supporting Actress in a Drama Series (1981–85)
1986	Crazy Like a Fox	Unknown	Episode: "A Fox at the Races"
1986	L.A. Law	Stacey Gill	2 episodes
1986	The New Mike Hammer	Mrs. Wayne	Episode: "Requiem for Billy"
1987	ABC Afterschool Special	Donna Crandall	Episode: "Supermom's Daughter"
1987–1989	Hooperman	Captain C.Z. Stern	42 episodes
1988	Hotel	Sydney Page	Episode: "Contest of Wills"
1988	Murder, She Wrote	Diane Raymond	Episode: "Wearing of the Green"
1990	Cop Rock	Mayor Louise Plank	10 episodes
1992–1993	Civil Wars	Justice Beth Babyak	3 episodes
1994	Star Trek: Deep Space Nine	Roana	Episode: "Rivals"
1994	NYPD Blue	Miriam Davis	Episode: "Simone Says"
1995–1997	Murder One	Miriam Grasso	41 episodes Viewers for Quality Television Award for Best Supporting Actress in a Quality Drama Series; Nominated—Primetime Emmy Award for Outstanding Supporting Actress in a Drama Series
1995	Lois & Clark: The New Adventures of Superman	Dr. Friskin	2 episodes
1997	Total Security	Pamela Chapin	Episode: "Evasion of the Body Snatchers"

== Awards and nominations ==
Year	Award	Category	Nominated work	Notes
1981	33rd Primetime Emmy Awards	Primetime Emmy Award for Outstanding Supporting Actress in a Drama Series	Hill Street Blues	Nominated
1982	34th Primetime Emmy Awards	Primetime Emmy Award for Outstanding Supporting Actress in a Drama Series	Hill Street Blues	Nominated
1983	35th Primetime Emmy Awards	Primetime Emmy Award for Outstanding Supporting Actress in a Drama Series	Hill Street Blues	Nominated
1984	36th Primetime Emmy Awards	Primetime Emmy Award for Outstanding Supporting Actress in a Drama Series	Hill Street Blues	Nominated
1985	37th Primetime Emmy Awards	Primetime Emmy Award for Outstanding Supporting Actress in a Drama Series	Hill Street Blues	Nominated
1996	48th Primetime Emmy Awards	Primetime Emmy Award for Outstanding Supporting Actress in a Drama Series	Murder One	Nominated
1996	Viewers for Quality Television	Best Supporting Actress in a Quality Drama Series	Murder One	Won
1997	Viewers for Quality Television	Best Supporting Actress in a Quality Drama Series	Murder One	Nominated
