= The Quest (1982 TV series) =

1982 TV series

- Genre: Action/Adventure
- Created by: Juanita Bartlett
- Written by: Juanita Bartlett; Stephen J. Cannell
- Directed by: Rod Holcomb
- Starring: Perry King; Noah Beery Jr.
- Theme music composer: Pete Carpenter; Mike Post
- Country of origin: United States
- Original language: English
- No. of seasons: 1
- No. of episodes: 9 (4 unaired)

Production
- Executive producer: Juanita Bartlett
- Producers: John Ashley; Jo Swerling, Jr.
- Camera setup: Single-camera
- Running time: 48 mins.
- Production company: Stephen J. Cannell Productions

Original release
- Network: ABC
- Release: October 22 – November 19, 1982

The Quest is an American action/adventure television series that aired on ABC from October 22 to November 19, 1982. The series stars Perry King, Noah Beery Jr., Karen Austin, and Ray Vitte as potential heirs to the throne of a fictional European monarchy that, were its king to die without issue, would revert to rule by France. Produced by Stephen J. Cannell, the series was canceled after five episodes.

== Cast ==
- Perry King as Dan Underwood
- Noah Beery Jr. as Art Henley
- Ray Vitte as Cody Johnson
- Karen Austin as Carrie Welby
- Michael Billington as Count Louis Dardinay
- John Rhys-Davies as Sir Edward
- Ralph Michael as King Charles

== Episodes ==
No.	Title	Directed by	Written by	Original release date
1 2	"Pilot"	Rod Holcomb	Juanita Bartlett	October 22, 1982
3	"Last One There Is a Rotten Heir"	Unknown	Unknown	October 29, 1982
4	"He Stole-a My Art"	Unknown	Unknown	November 5, 1982
5	"His Majesty, I Presume?"	Unknown	Unknown	November 12, 1982
6	"Escape from a Velvet Box"	Unknown	Unknown	November 19, 1982
7	"A Prince of a Fellow"	N/A	N/A	Unaired
8	"Hunt for the White Tiger"	N/A	N/A	Unaired
9	"Daddy's Home"	N/A	N/A	Unaired
10	"R.S.V.P."	N/A	N/A	Unaired

== U.S. ratings ==
Season	Episodes	Start date	End date	Nielsen rank	Nielsen rating
1982-83	9 (4 Unaired)	October 22, 1982	November 19, 1982	97	N/A
