= Juanita Bartlett =

American screenwriter and television producer

Juanita Bartlett (February 28, 1927 – February 25, 2014) was an American screenwriter and television producer best known for her work on The Rockford Files and The New Maverick, both starring James Garner. She also worked on Garner's series Nichols, as well as The Greatest American Hero, Scarecrow and Mrs. King, and several others.

== Early years ==
Although she was born in San Francisco, Bartlett spent her early years in Honolulu, Hawaii, after her family moved there. They returned to California when she was 10 years old. After her initial efforts at writing stories for magazines were rejected, she took a job writing scripts for a radio interview program in New York City. She went on to hold secretarial and office management positions while still writing in her spare time.

== Career ==
Bartlett worked for Roy Huggins, Stephen J. Cannell, and Meta Rosenberg, and also became a producer as well as a writer. Huggins noted in a videotaped interview for the Archive of American Television that Bartlett was the only writer with whom he ever worked who changed the structure of some of Huggins' stories and actually improved them.

In 1986, Juanita Bartlett created her own production company originally known as Jadda Productions. Jadda Productions' first production was the second season of Spenser: For Hire, and would later go on to produce the show In the Heat of the Night when it premiered on March 6, 1988. When the second season of In the Heat of the Night premiered, the production company was renamed Juanita Bartlett Productions. After the last In the Heat of the Night movie aired after Hugh O'Connor died, Juanita Bartlett Productions ceased to exist.

In 1979 and 1980, Bartlett was nominated for an Emmy Award for Outstanding Drama Series for her work on The Rockford Files.

Bartlett died on February 25, 2014, three days shy of her 87th birthday.

== Television series ==
(More than two episodes)

Year	Title	Notes
1971–1972	Nichols	Writer 5 episodes
1974–1980	The Rockford Files	Creative consultant 107 episodes (Supervising) prod. 12 episodes Writer 33 episodes
1979–1980	Young Maverick	Creator/Developer 8 episodes
1979–1980	Stone	Co-prod. 10 episodes
1980	Tenspeed and Brown Shoe	Co-exec. prod. 10 episodes; Writer 3 episodes
1981–1983	The Greatest American Hero	Co-exec. prod. 30 episodes; Writer 5 episodes
1982	The Quest	Creator; Writer 9 episodes
1984–1985	Scarecrow and Mrs. King	Exec. prod. 27 episodes; Writer 5 episodes
1986–1987	Spenser: For Hire	Exec. prod. 22 episodes
1988	In the Heat of the Night	Exec. prod. 8 episodes

=== Television production company ===
(Series episodes only)

Year	Title	Notes
1986–1987	Spenser: For Hire	Jadda Productions – 22 episodes (all season two)
1988–1994	In the Heat of the Night	Jadda Productions – 8 episodes (all season one) — (name change: Jadda Productions → Juanita Bartlett Productions); Juanita Bartlett Productions – 134 episodes (seasons two through seven)
