= The Rockford Files =

American detective drama television series (1974–1980)

- Title card with Noah Beery Jr. in photograph
- Genre: Detective fiction
- Created by: Roy Huggins; Stephen J. Cannell
- Starring: James Garner; Noah Beery Jr. Joe Santos; Gretchen Corbett; Stuart Margolin
- Theme music composer: Mike Post; Pete Carpenter
- Composers: Mike Post; Pete Carpenter (co-composer with Post); Artie Kane (two episodes); Dick DeBenedictis (one episode)
- Country of origin: United States
- Original language: English
- No. of seasons: 6
- No. of episodes: 123 (+ pilot movie and 8 TV movies) (list of episodes)

Production
- Executive producers: Stephen J. Cannell; Meta Rosenberg
- Producers: Juanita Bartlett; David Chase; Chas. Floyd Johnson
- Production locations: Paradise Cove - 28128 Pacific Coast Highway, Malibu, California; Los Angeles; Los Angeles Police Department, Hollywood Station - 1358 Wilcox Ave, Los Angeles, California; Hollywood, Los Angeles, California; Apartments, Backlot, Universal Studios - 100 Universal City Plaza, Universal City, California
- Running time: 50 minutes
- Production companies: Roy Huggins-Public Arts Productions; Cherokee Productions; Universal Television

Original release
- Network: NBC
- Release: September 13, 1974 – January 10, 1980

The Rockford Files is an American detective drama television series starring James Garner, aired on NBC from September 13, 1974, to January 10, 1980. Garner portrays Los Angeles private investigator Jim Rockford, with Noah Beery Jr. in the supporting role of his father, Joseph "Rocky" Rockford, a retired truck driver. The show was created by Roy Huggins and Stephen J. Cannell.

Huggins had created the American Western TV show Maverick (1957–1962), in which Garner also starred, and he wanted to create a similar show in a modern-day detective setting. In 2002, The Rockford Files was ranked number 39 on TV Guide's 50 Greatest TV Shows of All Time.

== Premise ==
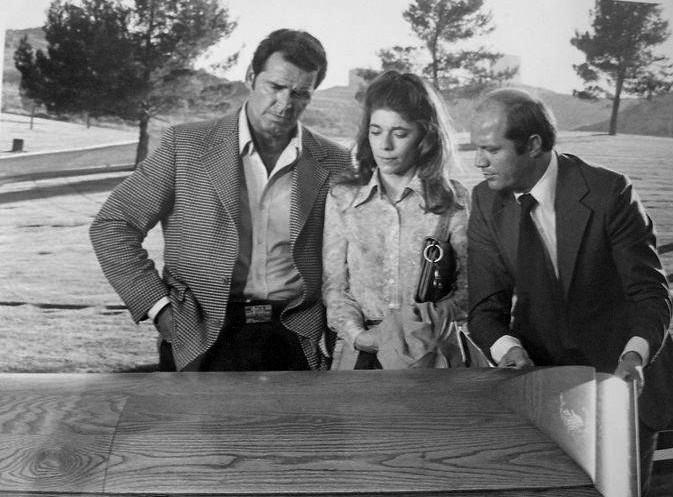
Rockford's investigation of a missing woman takes him to a local cemetery (episode 5, "Tall Woman in Red Wagon").

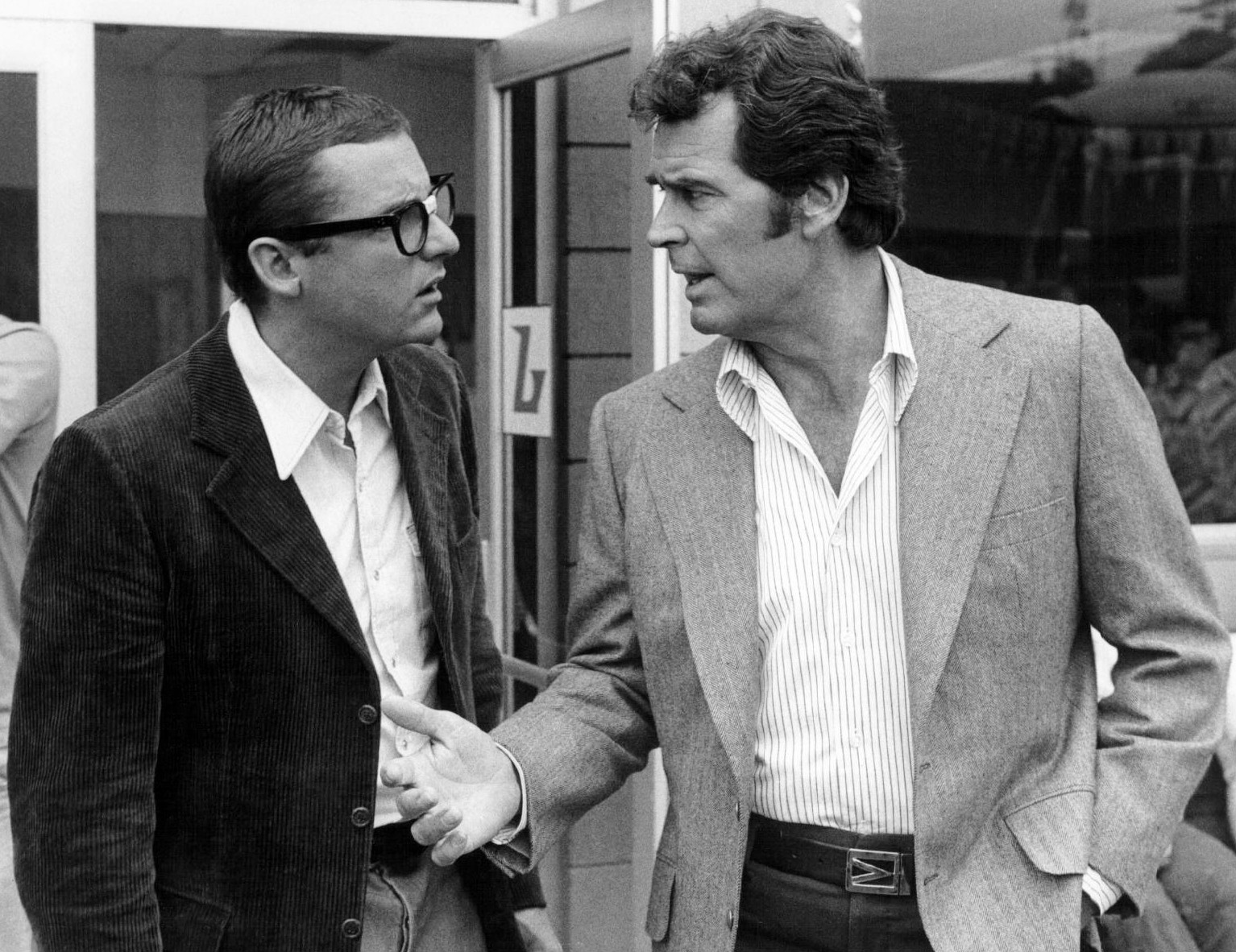
Rockford has a few heated words with would-be private eye Freddie Beamer (James Whitmore Jr.).

Huggins and Cannell devised the Rockford character as a departure from typical television detectives, essentially Bret Maverick as a modern detective.

In the series storyline, James Scott "Jim" Rockford had served time in California's San Quentin Prison in the 1960s due to a wrongful conviction. After five years, he was pardoned (not paroled, a distinction frequently mentioned in plot points). His work as a private investigator barely allows him to maintain his weathered mobile home (which doubles as his office) in a parking lot on a beach in Malibu, California.

In early episodes of the first season, Rockford's trailer is located in a parking lot alongside the highway at 22878 Pacific Coast Highway, Malibu, and near the ocean; for the rest of the series, the trailer is at Paradise Cove (address 29 Cove Road), adjacent to a pier and a restaurant (The Sand Castle, now known as the Paradise Cove Beach Cafe).

In the television movies from 1994 to 1999, Rockford is still living and working at the same Paradise Cove location, but in a much newer trailer that has been extensively enlarged and remodeled.

In contrast to sharp-dressed, pugnacious television private eyes of the time, Rockford wears casual, off-the-rack clothing and tries to avoid physical altercations. He can hold his own in a one-on-one fistfight, but is frequently overpowered when ambushed or outnumbered, often from behind, but he almost always winds up figuring out what is going on, catching the bad guys/gals, and usually exacting revenge by the end of the episode, with some notable exceptions. He is experienced, observant, tenacious, and quick-thinking, and has a faculty for impersonation and accents (usually Southern, drawing on Garner's Oklahoma background).

He rarely carries his Colt Detective Special revolver, for which he has no permit and usually stores in a cookie jar, and prefers to talk his way out of trouble. He works on cold cases, missing persons investigations, and low-budget insurance scams, repeatedly stating that he does not handle "open cases" to avoid trouble with the police. (This self-imposed rule was relaxed in later seasons, after "trouble with the police" became a frequent plot device)

Rockford has been a private investigator since 1968 (according to his Yellow Pages ad, glimpsed in a few episodes), and his oft-quoted fee, when he can collect it, is $200 per day plus expenses By the time of the 1990s reunion movies, Rockford's fee was $450 a day, plus expenses. Rockford is very insistent on his fee, but in a running gag, circumstances often conspire to prevent Rockford from collecting the full amount he is owed after a case.

== Production ==
The show was created by Roy Huggins and Stephen J. Cannell. Huggins had created, written for, and produced Garner's breakthrough series Maverick in 1957 and envisioned The Rockford Files as presenting a similar character as a modern private investigator rather than a gambler in the American Old West. Huggins teamed with Cannell, who had written for Jack Webb's Mark VII Productions such as Adam-12 and Chase (1973–1974, NBC), to create The Rockford Files. The show was credited as "A Public Arts/Roy Huggins Production" along with Cherokee Productions in association with Universal Television. Cherokee was owned by Garner, with partners Meta Rosenberg and Juanita Bartlett, who doubled as story editor during most of The Rockford Files run.

== Cast ==
Listed in the opening credits:

- James Garner is Jim Rockford.
- Noah Beery Jr. as Joseph "Rocky" Rockford, is Jim's father, a retired truck driver. (The role was played by Robert Donley in the pilot episode.)
- Joe Santos as Sergeant Dennis Becker, is Jim's friend in the Los Angeles Police Department; he was promoted to lieutenant in season five.

Frequently recurring cast:

- Stuart Margolin as Evelyn Angelo "Angel" Martin, is Jim's former prison friend. Angel is an untrustworthy, pathologically lying, con artist whose schemes constantly get Jim in trouble, yet Jim remains his friend.
- Gretchen Corbett as Elizabeth "Beth" Davenport, Jim's lawyer and sometime girlfriend (seasons one-four).
- James Luisi as Lieutenant Douglas J. "Doug" Chapman (seasons three–six), is Becker's superior officer (until Becker's promotion). Chapman and Rockford despise one another, although in later episodes, Chapman grudgingly acknowledges Rockford's street smarts.
- Tom Atkins as Lieutenant Alex/Thomas Diehl, Becker's superior officer (seasons one-two and four) who has an antagonistic relationship with Rockford.

Seen in multiple episodes:

- Pat Finley as Peggy Becker is Sergeant Becker's wife (six episodes).
- Isaac Hayes is Gandolph "Gandy" Fitch, a brutal, violent acquaintance of Rockford's from his prison days. He almost always calls Jim "Rockfish". Jim helps prove Fitch did not commit the crime for which he was imprisoned. The two become friendly. In later episodes, Fitch tags along with an unscrupulous investigator Marcus Hayes (Louis Gossett Jr.) trying to cash in on one of Rockford's cases, and needs Jim's help dealing with mobsters connected to the ex-husband of his new girlfriend (played by Dionne Warwick). Jim remains on good terms with Fitch, towards whom he seems to display an almost naive blind spot despite Fitch's refusal to ever take Jim's "no" for an answer, and his lack of compunction about using violence, including occasionally on a recalcitrant Jim himself (three episodes).
- Bo Hopkins is John "Coop" Cooper, Jim's disbarred attorney friend in season five (four episodes).
- Tom Selleck is Lance White, a successful and glamorous private investigator with an uncynical approach to the business. Lance is liked and admired by everyone, and Jim is a bit jealous and considers him naive, lucky, and likely to cause others to get hurt (two episodes). According to Stephen J. Cannell's Archive of American Television interview, Lance White was based on "Waco Williams", a similarly polished character in Maverick appearing in the episode "The Saga of Waco Williams". Williams was portrayed in Maverick by Wayde Preston, who in 1958 resembled Tom Selleck two decades later. Selleck later became famous as Thomas Magnum in the 1980s detective series Magnum, P.I.
- Dennis Dugan is Richie Brockelman, a young, idealistic, and seemingly naive private investigator who seeks Jim's help from time to time. Bereft of Jim's cynicism and physical toughness, Richie is nevertheless a sharp operator who used his outwardly trusting gee whiz persona to mask his dogged cleverness. This character was initially introduced in the short-lived Richie Brockelman, Private Eye (two two-part episodes).
- Kathryn Harrold is Dr. Megan Dougherty, a blind psychiatrist who hires Jim. Their relationship eventually blossoms into a romance. Jim is upset in a later episode to learn that she has become engaged to another man (two episodes).
- Simon Oakland is Vern St. Cloud, a blustery, arrogant, and often untrustworthy fellow private investigator. St. Cloud and Rockford grudgingly accept each other's assistance from time to time, trading insults along the way (Oakland appeared in a sixth-season episode playing an unrelated character, three episodes).
- Louis Gossett Jr. as Marcus Aurelius "Gabby" Hayes, an impeccably dressed, chauffeur-driven, boastful P.I. who is nearly always on a hustle, usually to Rockford's misfortune. Gossett appeared first in "Foul on the First Play" wearing a full wig with sideburns, appearing the following season in "Just Another Polish Wedding" without it (two episodes).
- Rita Moreno as Rita Capkovic, is a call girl and occasional police informant, who is targeted by a millionaire businessman because of her friendship with an elderly widow. In later episodes, she gets accused of the murder of a client; when she tries to leave her profession and hides out with Rockford, it enrages her sadistic former pimp. Whether Jim and Rita are ever romantically involved, beyond their close friendship (three episodes), is unclear.
- James Whitmore Jr. is Fred Beamer, an auto mechanic who aspires to be a private investigator, and involves himself in Jim's affairs. In his first appearance, Beamer assumed Jim's identity, living in his trailer, making numerous purchases on credit for detection equipment of questionable efficacy, driving (and heavily damaging) his Firebird, and taking on clients, plunging Jim into trouble. (Whitmore later directed the TV movie The Rockford Files: I Still Love L.A.) (two episodes).
- Al Stevenson is L.J., a friend of Rocky's, who often performs odd jobs for Rocky and Jim (in one episode, Jim discovers him alone at Rocky's house repairing a shower faucet). L.J. is closer to Jim's age than Rocky's, and they likely met during the latter's career as a trucker (four episodes).
- Luis Delgado as Officer Todd Billings, is seen frequently at the precinct or at crime scenes. Delgado played a number of other bit roles in early Rockford seasons before settling into the recurring minor role of Billings starting in season three. Delgado was the brother-in-law of series co-creator Roy Huggins, and James Garner's long-time stand-in.
- Bucklind Beery as Officer Al Mazursky, is another recurring bit-part officer very occasionally seen at the precinct during seasons two-five. Bucklind Beery is the son of Noah Beery Jr.
- Hunter von Leer (credited as Hunter Von Leer) as Skip Spence, is a libidinous, money-seeking lifeguard stationed on the beach near Jim's trailer. Jim finds Skip distasteful, but Skip occasionally provides information helpful to him. In one episode Skip gives information to gangsters searching for Jim (two episodes).
- Jack Garner (James Garner's real-life brother) was seen in numerous bit parts including a policeman, a gas station attendant, and a stranger in a bathroom. He then assumed the role of the fence-sitting, ineffectual Captain McEnroe (Becker's superior officer) in season six.

=== Supporting characters ===
Dennis Becker: Rockford's pursuit of cases often leads to difficulties with his friend in the LAPD, Sgt. Dennis Becker (Joe Santos), a homicide detective struggling to advance in the department under a series of overbearing lieutenants. The two most notable are Alex/Thomas Diehl (Tom Atkins) during the first, second, and fourth seasons and Doug Chapman (James Luisi) in the third to sixth seasons. Those higher-ups invariably dislike Rockford (and private investigators generally) because of their perception that either he is meddling in open cases or is trying to make the LAPD look incompetent in its handling of closed cases. Further, Rockford often calls Becker asking for favors, such as running license plates through the California Department of Motor Vehicles computer system, often annoying the already overworked cop. By the fifth season, Becker is promoted to lieutenant; the episode where Becker is promoted stated that Becker's association with Rockford, considered by LAPD brass to be a shifty ex-con, had hampered Becker's chances for promotion. Chapman was irritated when Becker became his "equal". In season-six episode "The Big Cheese", the third-to-last of the series, Rockford gets a degree of revenge when Chapman inadvertently makes incriminating statements about his tax evasion before an undercover IRS agent who is with Rockford. Becker appears in 89 of the 123 episodes.

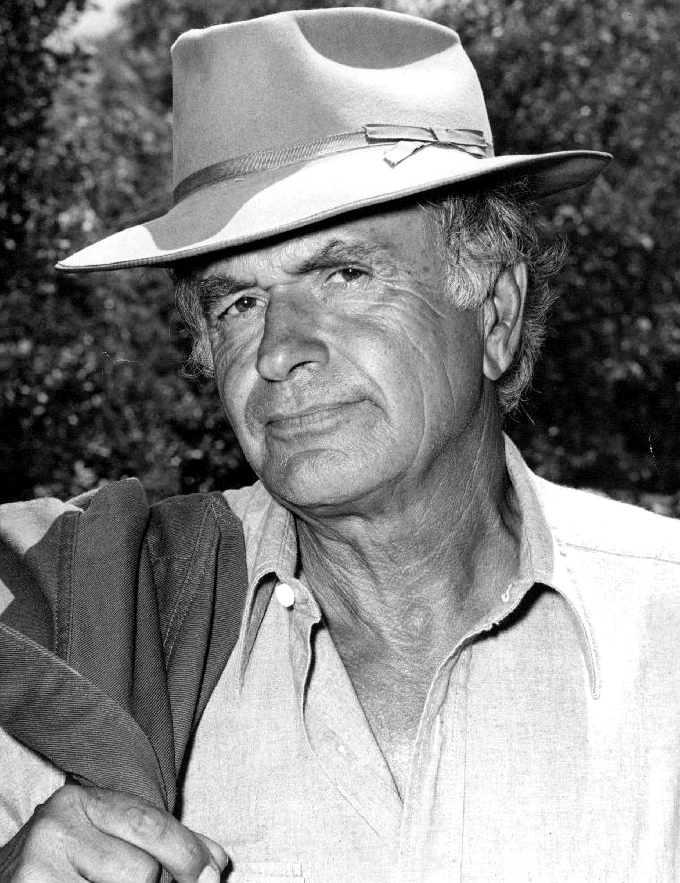
Noah Beery Jr. as Joseph "Rocky" Rockford, Jim's father

Joseph "Rocky" Rockford: Rockford's father, Joseph "Rocky" Rockford, is an ex-Seabee, semi-retired, truck driver who nags his son to find stable (and less dangerous) employment, often urging him to follow in his footsteps as a truck driver (especially in early seasons), and often wishing Jim would get married. The relationship of father and son was an integral part of the show. Rocky appears in 101 episodes, and usually becomes involved (like it or not) in his son's cases. Occasionally, he hires Jim himself. Jim Rockford's mother is never shown or named, and is very seldom referred to; though never stated directly, she apparently died some years ago.

Rocky was portrayed by Noah Beery Jr. except in the 1974 pilot film, where he was portrayed by Robert Donley. Although much of the character's backstory is the same, in the pilot, Rocky is portrayed as more of a small-time grifter and operator — at one point, working with a partner, Rocky unsuccessfully tries to run a minor scam on Jim, his own son. This element of Rocky's character would largely be dropped as the series started. Beery's version of Rocky was generally honest and reliable, though not above working an unreported job under the table to supplement his pension income, or eating the most expensive food in Jim's refrigerator if he dropped by while Jim was out.

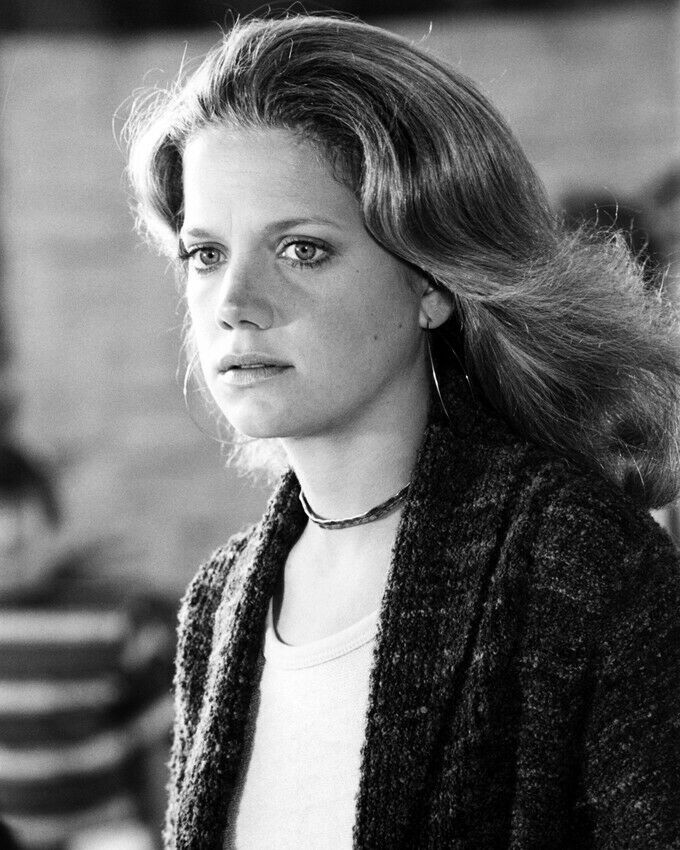
Gretchen Corbett as Beth Davenport in 1975

Beth Davenport: Rockford has a close relationship with his attorney, the idealistic, tenacious Elizabeth "Beth" Davenport (Gretchen Corbett). In second-season episode "A Portrait of Elizabeth", it is explained that Beth and Rockford had dated for a time (prior to the beginning of the series), but she soon became aware of his emotional unavailability and lack of interest in a long-term relationship, and realized that they would be better off as friends (although the two do seem to still casually date on occasion during early seasons).

Angel Martin: Rockford's scheming former San Quentin cellmate, Evelyn "Angel" Martin was something of a comic relief character played by Stuart Margolin. Jim employs Angel as an operative from time to time, often to gather street-level information, or to help him access the files of the newspaper where Angel works as a low-level filing clerk. Keeping this job is a condition of Angel's parole; even so, the ever-shifty Angel would be unlikely to be capable of doing so, except that his brother-in-law owns the paper. Jim also uses Angel on a few occasions to play a supporting role in con games that he sets up to sting especially difficult adversaries.

Angel is himself forever running some sort of (usually very bottom-of-the-barrel) con game, and is consistently ready to sell anyone out at a moment's notice for his own benefit — and often does. In doing so, Angel almost always gets Rockford in trouble, usually by involving him in hare-brained scams ... often without Jim's knowledge, and never with his consent. As often as not, Angel's antics result in his, Jim's and/or others' arrests, and/or being placed on somebody's hit list. In spite of this, Jim considers Angel as one of his best, if most exasperating, pals. Towards the end of the series, a noticeable cooling occurs in Jim's attitude toward Angel in their often-fractious relationship; however, the rift seems to have been repaired by the time of the reunion movies.

Others: After Corbett was dropped from the show following the fourth season (allegedly due to contract disputes between Universal, which owned her contract, and Cherokee Productions, Garner's company), John Cooper (Bo Hopkins), a disbarred attorney, was added as a new adviser for the frequent legal problems in which Rockford would become entangled. A new romantic interest, Dr. Megan Dougherty (Kathryn Harrold), a blind highly independent psychiatrist, appears in two episodes in seasons five and six ("Black Mirror" and "Love Is the Word", respectively) and the 1996 television movie The Rockford Files: Punishment and Crime.

== Credits ==
=== Writers ===
The show's pilot was written by Cannell, who also wrote 36 episodes and was the show's co-creator. Juanita Bartlett, one of the show's producers and Garner's partner at Cherokee Productions, wrote 34 episodes. She also wrote for Scarecrow and Mrs. King, The Greatest American Hero, and In the Heat of the Night. David Chase wrote or co-wrote 20 episodes; he later went on to Northern Exposure and The Sopranos. The show's co-creator, Roy Huggins, also wrote for the show during the first season, always using pen name John Thomas James. "John Thomas James" received "story by" credit on 15 of the first 20 episodes of The Rockford Files, but Huggins' contributions to the show ended midway through the first season after he submitted a script rewrite direct to set as an episode was shooting, without getting approval from any other writer or producer. Garner, trying to work with the material on set, felt the rewrite was unsatisfactory, and could not figure out why it had been approved for shooting. When he discovered that neither Cannell nor any of the other production staff members knew anything about the rewrite, Garner issued a directive that Cannell, not Huggins, had final say on all script material. Though Huggins was credited as a producer for the entire run of the series, this effectively ended his creative involvement with the show, as he submitted no further material to The Rockford Files and did not involve himself in the day-to-day running of the series.

=== Directors ===
Frequent directors included William Wiard (23 episodes), Lawrence Doheny (10 episodes), and Ivan Dixon (previously a regular on Hogan's Heroes) (nine episodes). James Coburn, who co-starred with Garner in The Great Escape (1963) and The Americanization of Emily (1964), directed one episode. Other actors who directed episodes include Jackie Cooper (three), as well as Richard Crenna and Dana Elcar (one each). Co-creator Stephen J. Cannell directed several episodes; executive producer Meta Rosenberg directed six episodes; series regular Stuart Margolin helmed two; and James Garner directed one episode in the second season, "The Girl in The Bay City Boys' Club". It was Garner's only directing credit in his entire 50-plus-year film career; in his autobiography, The Garner Files, Garner states he only took on the assignment because the scheduled director was unexpectedly unavailable at the last minute.

== Vehicles ==
=== Pontiac Firebird Esprit ===
Familiar to viewers was Jim Rockford's gold Pontiac Firebird Esprit car. One oft-recurring element of the show was the famous "Jim Rockford turn-around" (also known as a J-turn or a "moonshiner's turn" - commonly employed as an evasive driving technique taught to Secret Service). Garner explained the move in his 2011 autobiography The Garner Files: "When you are going straight in reverse about 35 miles an hour, you come off the gas pedal, go hard left, and pull on the emergency brake. That locks the wheels and throws the front end around. Then you release everything, hit the gas, and off you go in the opposite direction." Garner stated in a season-one DVD interview that he performed this stunt for the duration of the series. The car's license plate was 853 OKG, although the plate in some early episodes displayed the number 835 OKG. Garner writes in his autobiography that he believes that the letters OKG stood for "Oklahoma Garner" but that he does not know the origin of the number 853.

Starting with the 1974 model year, Rockford would get a new model-year Pontiac Firebird each year throughout the series. The Firebirds used had an identical "copper mist" color with the Esprit's exterior and interior. Although the Firebirds were badged as Esprits, they were actually the higher-performance "Formula" model without the twin scoop hood. Garner needed Rockford's car to look like the lower-tiered Esprit model, a car Rockford could afford, but have the performance necessary for the chase sequences in the show. To achieve this, the show featured Pontiac Firebird Formulas rebadged and rehooded to look like the Esprit model. The Formula model was developed to provide the performance of the top-level Trans Am in a less ostentatious form. Formulas did not have the shaker hood scoop, side vents, graphics, or lettering used on the Trans Am, but they had the same higher-horsepower engines and drive trains, larger front and rear antisway bars, stiffer springs and shocks, and a twin-scoop hood. (Sharp-eyed car connoisseurs can spot the twin exhausts and rear antisway bar on the cars used on the show, options that were not part of the Esprit package, as well as spot the different model-year cars used in various chase scenes that differed from those in an actual episode, especially in later seasons.) Although the series ran until early 1980, no Firebird was used past the 1978 model year as Garner reportedly was displeased with the restyled front end of the 1979 and later Firebird models, and as such, did not wish them featured on the show (although an answering machine message in one episode in the final season indicated his car was a 1979 Firebird).

In the first TV movie, I Still Love L.A. in 1994, the Firebird is shown, in ramshackle disrepair, parked next to Rockford's trailer. He mentions he plans to have it "fixed up", but drives other cars throughout the films.

=== GMC Sierra Classic pickup ===
Joseph "Rocky" Rockford drove a GMC Sierra Classic pickup truck throughout the series. In the course of the storylines, Jim often borrowed Rocky's truck when his own Firebird was being repaired from its frequent major damage sustained during cases, or was too "hot" (i.e., the LAPD, which knew Jim well, was seeking to bring him in).

Rocky's truck had a 400-cubic-inch engine, Turbo 400 automatic transmission, and a four-wheel drive factory setup. The custom exterior paint was silver with maroon panels and orange pinstriping. Additionally, the truck sported various after-market accessories added by noted California customizer and off-road racer Vic Hickey, including the winch, brush guard, hubcap covers, sidestep bed plates, auxiliary gas tanks, custom steering wheel, rear roll bar, Cibié headlamps mounted on the front bumper/rear roll bar, and Pace CB radio. In several season-five and -six episodes, Rocky drives a candy-apple red 1980 GMC C-10 short box pickup when his original vehicle is said to be in the shop for repair of damage from one of Jim's earlier adventures.

=== Other cars ===
Beth Davenport drove a yellow 1973 Porsche 914 in season one, before switching to an orange 1975 model in season two (though in episode 202, "The Farnsworth Stratagem", she drove a 1972 Audi 100 C1) and using it through the first half of Season 3, last appearance in episode 311, "The Trouble With Warren". In season three, she switched to a Mercedes-Benz 450SL. Police cars used during the series were usually the 1972-1973 AMC Matador, in real-life use by the LAPD during the 1970s. From the third season, the 1974 second-series, "coffin nose" Matador was also used, which was also the last AMC model used by California law enforcement agencies.

== Theme tune ==
The show's theme tune, titled "The Rockford Files", was written by noted theme music composers Mike Post and Pete Carpenter. It appears at the opening and ending of each episode with different arrangements. Throughout the show's tenure, the theme tune went through numerous evolutions with later versions containing a distinct electric guitar-based bridge section played by session guitarist Dan Ferguson. The theme for #1.7 "This Case Is Closed II", also has the guitar section from later seasons, added when the episode was split into two parts for syndication.

The theme tune was released as a single and spent two weeks at number 10 on the Billboard Hot 100, in August 1975. The B-side track (or "flip-side"), titled "Dixie Lullabye", was also composed by Post and Carpenter. The single remained on the chart for 16 weeks and won a 1975 Grammy Award for Best Instrumental Arrangement. In Canada, the tune reached number eight, and was number 84 in the year-end chart.

For more than 40 years, the British football team Tranmere Rovers have used the Rockford theme as walk-out music for most games. Occasionally, it has been dropped, and then restored by popular demand.

== Answering-machine introductions ==
Each episode began with the image of Rockford's answering machine, and the opening title sequence was accompanied by a message on a Dictaphone remote Ansafone 660. As the camera focuses on the telephone, whose number is 555-2368, it rings twice, and then Rockford's recorded voice is heard providing the following greeting:

This is Jim Rockford. At the tone, leave your name and message. I'll get back to you. [Beep]

The messages were usually unrelated to the current episode, but were often related to previous events in earlier episodes. They were a humorous device that invited the viewer to return to the quirky, down-on-his-luck world of Jim Rockford. The messages usually had to do with creditors or deadbeat clients, or were just oddball vignettes. Though a distinctive and clever entry device, the messages became difficult for the writers to create. Suggestions from staff and crew were welcome and often used.

In total, 122 different messages were created through the run of the original six seasons. The eight CBS TV movies (also referred to as season eight) feature a unique message, but episodes syndicated as James Rockford, Private Investigator use the same message; it was taken from the season-five episode "A Three-Day Affair with a Thirty-Day Escrow".

Each message is a standalone gag that often provides a small amount of biographical detail about Rockford, the people he knows, and the activities that occur in his life as a private investigator. Only extremely rarely (such as in season two, episode 9, "Chicken Little is a Little Chicken", during which Rockford house- and cat-sits for an absent Beth) is the content of the answering machine message in any way connected to the plot or situations of the episode itself.

== Aftermath ==
The show went into hiatus late in 1979 when Garner was told by his doctors to recuperate from numerous knee injuries and back trouble, as well as an ulcer. He sustained the former conditions largely because of the daily grind of an extremely physically demanding show, performing most of his own stunts for realism, especially those involving fist fights or car chases. Because of the toll on his body, Garner was ordered by his doctor to immediately take time off. Some months later, NBC abruptly cancelled the program in midseason and sued Garner for failure to perform. Allegedly, Rockford had become very expensive to produce, mainly due to the location filming and use of high-end actors as guest stars. According to sources, NBC and Universal claimed the show was generating a deficit of several million dollars, a staggering amount for a nighttime show at the time, although Garner and his production team Cherokee Productions claimed the show turned a profit. Garner told a story to Johnny Carson on The Tonight Show that the studio once paid a carpenter $700 to build a shipping crate for a shoot-out on a boat dock, though shipping crates were already on the dock. The script often called for Garner to damage his car, so the car could be sold, repaired, and repurchased for each episode.

Later in the 1980s, Garner became engaged in a legal dispute with Universal that lasted more than a decade, regarding the profits from The Rockford Files. The dispute caused significant ill will between Garner and the studio. The dispute was settled out of court in Garner's favor, but the conflict meant that the Rockford character would not re-emerge until 1994.

=== Syndication ===
Universal began syndicating the show in 1979 (originally under the alternate title Jim Rockford, Private Investigator to avoid viewer confusion as original episodes continued to run on NBC) and aggressively marketed it to local stations well into the early and mid-1980s. This accounts for its near ubiquity on afternoon and late-night schedules in those days. From those showings, Rockford developed a following with younger viewers, with the momentum continuing throughout the 1990s and 2000s on cable. (The Ben Folds Five song "Battle of Who Could Care Less", in which The Rockford Files is mentioned, is one example of the show's newfound youth following; furthermore, the Rockford Files theme tune is played at the end of the band's concerts.)

By 1989, the show had grossed $125,000,000 (equivalent to $325,000,000 in 2025) from network and syndicated runs.

In 2006, the show was broadcast for a few months on the national Chicago Superstation WGN. In 2007, the Retro Television Network began broadcasting the program nationwide, as did the digital cable channel Sleuth and Chicago TV station WWME-CA. ION Television has rights to the show and it is slated for future broadcast. In the fall of 2009, the show reappeared in Canada on Deja View.

In the UK, the series was first broadcast on BBC1 on Tuesday, 18 March 1975 at 20:10, with the original run concluding on 7 September 1980. A rerun began on BBC1 on 8 September 1981, again starting on Tuesdays at 19:40. It lasted until 30 May 1984, in September 1984 it switched to BBC2. Since then, it has been repeatedly rerun on BBC1 and BBC2, and also ITV and also on Granada +Plus, which later became ITV3, although none of these channels repeated the later seasons.

In West Germany, the series first aired on 11 March 1976 on ARD, concluding on 9 September 1980. Some episodes were omitted, due to concerns over politics and violence. The episodes did not air in order, with season one and some of season two's episodes airing from 11 March 1976 to 17 February 1977 on alternating Thursdays at 21:00, seasons two to five episodes from 9 May 1978 to 11 September 1979 on alternating Tuesdays at 21:45, and season six episodes from 27 May to 9 September 1980, again on alternating Tuesdays at 21:45. It was then rerun on Das Erste (ARD) from 25 June 1989 to 24 July 1991 on Sunday nights. On 21 March 1995, it began airing on RTL. The TV movies, with the exception of Friends and Foul Play aired between 2 February 1996 and 3 August 2000. Since 2024, ONE is showing all episodes uncut in their correct order and with an option the choose between the original English and the dubbed German audio track.

In Italy, the show began airing on Italia 1 on 19 April 1982, and aired until 1987.

In Australia, the series runs Monday - Friday on cable and satellite channel Fox Classics and on 7Mate. The series aired in the United States on the MeTV digital subchannel network until September 2, 2016. The series was available on Netflix until January 1, 2017, with the first three seasons then available on Hulu. From 2016 to 2020, the series was available on IMDb TV. In late 2020, it began streaming on Peacock. In 2022, it began streaming on Tubi. The series previously aired on Cozi TV. As of January 3, 2022, the series is airing on Get as part of its nightly lineup.

In Canada, as of the Autumn of 2025, the series is airing daily on CHCH-DT in the afternoon.

== Episodes ==
| Season | Episodes | Originally released | |
| Season | Episodes | First released | Last released |
|---|---|---|---|
| 1 | 23 | September 13, 1974 | March 7, 1975 |
| 2 | 22 | September 12, 1975 | March 19, 1976 |
| 3 | 22 | September 24, 1976 | April 1, 1977 |
| 4 | 22 | September 16, 1977 | February 24, 1978 |
| 5 | 22 | September 22, 1978 | April 13, 1979 |
| 6 | 12 | September 28, 1979 | January 10, 1980 |

== TV movies ==
After several long-running contractual disputes between Garner and Universal were resolved, eight Rockford Files reunion TV movies were made from 1994 to 1999, airing on the CBS network (whereas the original series aired on NBC) and reuniting most of the cast from the original show. Beery died on November 1, 1994, so the first of these films, which aired later that month, stated, "This picture is dedicated to the memory of Noah Beery, Jr. We love you and miss you, Pidge." ("Pidge" was Beery's nickname.)

The movies picked up nearly 15 years later from where the show ended. In the initial movies, Rocky is referenced as alive, but is off-screen; he dies (within the series continuity) sometime before the third movie.

Garner, Santos, and Margolin appear in every movie. Other Rockford regulars who appear in multiple movies include Luisi, Atkins, Corbett, and Jack Garner (as Capt. McEnroe). Recurring players from the series who are brought back for a single return appearance include Rita Moreno (as Rita Kapkovic), Kathryn Harrold (as Megan Daugherty), and Pat Finley (as Peggy Becker).

Also added to the cast (i.e., appearing only in the movies and in small, recurring roles) were Gerry Gibson as "Critch" Critchland, the owner of The Sand Castle restaurant across from Jim's trailer; and Shirley Anthony as Sally, a friendly, cheerful grandmotherly type who frequented the precinct to (falsely) confess to crimes, and to knit sweaters while she waited. Anthony had previously been a frequent extra and occasional bit part player on The Rockford Files from 1976 to 1979.

== Spin-offs ==
=== Richie Brockelman, Private Eye ===
The series Richie Brockelman, Private Eye was a spin-off of The Rockford Files. The character of Richie Brockelman, played by Dennis Dugan, was originally created for a 1976 TV movie intended as a series pilot produced by Cannell, but NBC did not pick up the series nor air the pilot movie. However, Cannell introduced the Brockelman character in the 1978 Rockford Files episode "The House on Willis Avenue", which was broadcast the week before Richie Brockelman, Private Eye began its five-week trial run in The Rockford Files time slot. The series was not renewed behind that limited run, but the Brockelman character returned in the 1979 Rockford Files episode "Never Send a Boy King To Do a Man's Job".

=== Gabby & Gandy ===
Universal made a backdoor pilot featuring the characters Gandolph "Gandy" Fitch and Marcus "Gabby" Hayes (played by Isaac Hayes and Louis Gossett Jr., respectively) in the episode titled "Just Another Polish Wedding". The intention was to spin this out into a series called Gabby & Gandy, but the series never came to fruition.

=== Just a Coupla Guys ===
A second backdoor pilot was made for a series that would have featured Greg Antonacci and Eugene M. Davis as Eugene Conigliaro and Mickey Long, two wannabe gangsters who were introduced in the episode "The Jersey Bounce". The series pilot involved them trying to ingratiate their way into the New Jersey mob and aired as "Just a Coupla Guys", the next-to-last episode of The Rockford Files.

While Conigliaro and Long are depicted as amateurish poseurs in both episodes, they are shown to be ruthless and dangerous, willing to kill, in "The Jersey Bounce", while in "Just a Coupla Guys" they are played more as comical bunglers, concluding the episode with a humorous exchange with Rockford.

David Chase, who wrote both episodes, later created The Sopranos, which centers on the New Jersey mob. A plotline in the second season is reminiscent of "The Jersey Bounce", following a pair of low-level gangsters who make poor presumptions about how to advance their careers in the mob. Greg Antonacci, the actor who played Conigliaro, had a recurring role as the underboss of a rival family in the final two seasons of the series.

== Remakes ==
In 2009, NBC, Universal Media Studios and Steve Carell's Carousel Television produced a revival of the show. Dermot Mulroney was cast as Rockford, Alan Tudyk cast as Becker, Melissa Sagemiller was cast as Beth Davenport, and Beau Bridges was cast as Rocky. A pilot, directed by Michael W. Watkins, was filmed but never broadcast. Early audiences indicated that the pilot was not directed well. The remake was subsequently scrapped by NBC.

A feature adaptation was in development at Universal Pictures in 2012, with Vince Vaughn as producer and star. After James Garner's death in 2014, the film was indefinitely postponed.

A pilot was in the works from NBC for the 2026–2027 season. In February 2026, it was announced that David Boreanaz had been cast to play Rockford for the reboot, and Michaela McManus was cast as Kate. On May 8, 2026, the series was picked up by NBC. The series will premiere on January 2, 2027, on NBC.

== Ratings ==
| Season | Ranking | Timeslot |
|---|---|---|
| 1974–75 | No. 12 | Fridays at 9:00 p.m. |
| 1975–76 | No. 32 | Fridays at 9:00 p.m. |
| 1976–77 | No. 41 | Fridays at 9:00 p.m. |
| 1977–78 | No. 43 | Fridays at 9:00 p.m. |
| 1978–79 | No. 58 | Fridays at 9:00 p.m./Saturdays at 10:00 p.m. |
| 1979–80 | N/A | Fridays at 9:00 p.m./Thursdays at 10:00 p.m. |

== Awards ==
=== Golden Globe Awards ===
| Year | Category | Nominee(s) | Result |
|---|---|---|---|
| 1978 | Best TV Actor - Drama | James Garner | Nominated |
| 1979 | Best TV Actor - Drama | James Garner | Nominated |
| 1980 | Best TV Series - Drama | | Nominated |
| 1980 | Best TV Actor - Drama | James Garner | Nominated |

=== Primetime Emmy Awards ===
| Year | Category | Nominee(s) | Episode(s) | Result |
|---|---|---|---|---|
| 1976 | Outstanding Lead Actor in a Drama Series | James Garner | | Nominated |
| 1977 | Outstanding Lead Actor in a Drama Series | James Garner | | Won |
| 1977 | Outstanding Continuing Performance by a Supporting Actor in a Drama Series | Noah Beery Jr. | | Nominated |
| 1978 | Outstanding Drama Series | Stephen J. Cannell, David Chase, Chas. Floyd Johnson, Meta Rosenberg | | Won |
| 1978 | Outstanding Lead Actor in a Drama Series | James Garner | | Nominated |
| 1978 | Outstanding Lead Actress for a Single Appearance in a Drama or Comedy Series | Rita Moreno | "The Paper Palace" | Won |
| 1979 | Outstanding Drama Series | Juanita Bartlett, Stephen J. Cannell, David Chase, Chas. Floyd Johnson, Meta Rosenberg | | Nominated |
| 1979 | Outstanding Lead Actor in a Drama Series | James Garner | | Nominated |
| 1979 | Outstanding Lead Actress in a Drama Series | Rita Moreno | "Rosendahl and Gilda Stern are Dead" | Nominated |
| 1979 | Outstanding Supporting Actor in a Drama Series | Noah Beery Jr. | | Nominated |
| 1979 | Outstanding Supporting Actor in a Drama Series | Stuart Margolin | | Won |
| 1979 | Outstanding Supporting Actor in a Drama Series | Joe Santos | | Nominated |
| 1980 | Outstanding Drama Series | Juanita Bartlett | | Nominated |
| 1980 | Outstanding Lead Actor in a Drama Series | James Garner | | Nominated |
| 1980 | Outstanding Lead Actress in a Drama Series | Lauren Bacall | "Lions, Tigers, Monkeys and Dogs" | Nominated |
| 1980 | Outstanding Lead Actress in a Drama Series | Mariette Hartley | "Paradise Cove" | Nominated |
| 1980 | Outstanding Supporting Actor in a Drama Series | Noah Beery Jr. | | Nominated |
| 1980 | Outstanding Supporting Actor in a Drama Series | Stuart Margolin | | Won |

=== Writers Guild of America Awards ===
| Year | Category | Nominee(s) | Episode(s) | Result |
|---|---|---|---|---|
| 1977 | Episodic Drama | Juanita Bartlett | "So Help Me God" | Nominated |
| 1978 | Episodic Drama | Stephen J. Cannell, Booker Bradshaw, & Calvin Kelly | "Beamer's Last Case" | Nominated |
| 1978 | Episodic Drama | David Chase | "Quickie Nirvana" | Nominated |
| 1979 | Episodic Drama | Stephen J. Cannell | "The House on Willis Avenue" | Nominated |
| 1980 | Episodic Drama | David Chase | "Love Is The Word" | Nominated |

=== Other awards ===
| Year | Award | Category | Nominee(s) | Work | Result |
|---|---|---|---|---|---|
| 1977 | American Cinema Editors, USA | Best Edited Episode for a Television Series | Rod Stephens | "No Fault Affair" | Nominated |
| 1977 | Bambi Awards | TV series International | James Garner | | Won |
| 1977 | Edgar Allan Poe Awards | Best Television Episode | David Chase | "The Oracle Wore A Cashmere Suit" | Nominated |
| 1978 | Edgar Allan Poe Awards | Best Television Episode | Juanita Bartlett | "The Deadly Maze" | Nominated |
| 2005 | Edgar Allan Poe Awards | Special Edgar Award | David Chase | | Won |
| 2005 | TV Land Awards | Favorite Private Eye | James Garner | | Nominated |

=== Novels ===
- The Rockford Files: The Green Bottle by Stuart M. Kaminsky (1996)
- The Rockford Files: Devil on My Doorstep by Stuart M. Kaminsky (1998)

== Home media ==
=== DVD ===
Universal Studios has released all six seasons of The Rockford Files on DVD in Region 1. On November 3, 2009, they released The Rockford Files- Movie Collection, Volume 1, featuring the first four post-series telefilms. On May 26, 2015, they released The Movie Collection, Volume 2, five-and-a-half years after the release of volume 1. They also released a 34-disc complete series collection on the same day.

On April 18, 2016, it was announced that Mill Creek Entertainment had acquired the rights to the series; they subsequently re-released the first two seasons on DVD in Region 1 on July 5, 2016. On June 13, 2017, Mill Creek re-released The Rockford Files: The Complete Series on DVD and also released the complete series on Blu-ray for the first time ever. This series is on NBCUniversal's Peacock streaming service.

Universal Playback has released the first 5 seasons on DVD in Region 2. The pilot for The Rockford Files is in the season 2 set.

=== Digital ===
The Complete Series was released as a digital boxset to purchase on various platforms in August 2026, as was a second boxset entitled The Complete TV Movie Collection.

=== Streaming ===
As of 2026, the complete series streams on The Roku Channel, while some seasons air on other platforms.

| DVD Name | Episode No. | Release dates | | |
| DVD Name | Episode No. | Region 1 | Region 2 | Region 4 |
|---|---|---|---|---|
| Season One | 23 | December 6, 2005 | August 29, 2005 | February 6, 2008 |
| Season Two | 22 | June 13, 2006 | August 21, 2006 | February 6, 2008 |
| Season Three | 22 | February 27, 2007 | May 7, 2007 | September 2, 2009 |
| Season Four | 22 | May 15, 2007 | July 30, 2007 | February 10, 2016 |
| Season Five | 22 | January 15, 2008 | May 12, 2008 | February 10, 2016 |
| Season Six | 12 | January 20, 2009 | November 19, 2009 | May 18, 2016 |
| Movies Collection, Volume 1 | 4 | November 3, 2009 | March 1, 2013 | May 18, 2016 |
| Movies Collection, Volume 2 | 4 | May 26, 2015 | March 1, 2013 | May 18, 2016 |
| Season 1 – 4 Collection | 89 | N/A | October 22, 2007 | N/A |
| The Complete Series | 130 | May 26, 2015 | July 9, 2018 | October 17, 2018 |

=== Blu-ray ===
On June 27, 2017, Mill Creek Entertainment released The Rockford Files: The Complete Series on Blu-ray in Region A for the very first time.
