= Meta Rosenberg =

American television producer

- Born: Meta Arenson; June 5, 1915; San Francisco, California, U.S.
- Died: December 30, 2004 (aged 89); Los Angeles, California, U.S.
- Other name: Meta Reis
- Occupations: Editor, talent agent, producer
- Years active: 1961–1982
- Known for: The Rockford Files
- Spouses: Irving Reis (m. 1938, divorced); George Rosenberg (m. 1947; died 1969)
- Children: 1

Meta Rosenberg (5 June 1915 – 30 December 2004), born Meta Arenson, was an American television producer and talent agent, who was also executive producer of the television series The Rockford Files.

== Early life ==
Born in San Francisco and raised in Los Angeles, Rosenberg graduated from Hollywood High School in 1930, after skipping three grades. After a period working at Stanley Rose's bookstore, she became a story editor at 20th Century Fox and later led the story department at Paramount Pictures.

From the mid-thirties to the late forties, Rosenberg was head of the literary department at the Berg-Allenberg talent agency, and worked with such writers as Christopher Isherwood, Bertold Brecht, and Raymond Chandler. In 1950, she adopted a daughter and spent most of the 1950s as a stay-at-home mother.

== HUAC testimony ==
Along with her first husband Irving Reis, Rosenberg was a member of the Communist Party for seven years, but eventually came to regard the party as intellectually intolerant and prone to using intimidation tactics to enforce conformity: "The minute you disagree, they begin to call you names, and this is a form of intimidation, this is a form of fear."

In April 1951 she testified before the House Un-American Activities Committee as a friendly witness, identifying other party members whom she had seen at party meetings. Among the names she put forward were actress Dorothy Tree and her husband Michael Uris, writer Francis Faragoh, agent George Willner, screenwriter Madeleine Ruthven, artist Edward Biberman, and screenwriter Carlton Moss.

Rosenberg's decision to supply names to HUAC led to social ostracism and derision from former friends. Nunnally Johnson sent her a telegram stating, "I trust this will convince you that politics is no business for a fetching girl. Politics is for flat-chested girls." On another occasion she was derided as a "stool pigeon" while walking down La Cienega Boulevard. Her former friend Dalton Trumbo criticized her for having named names selectively: "[She] behaved like most informers when called before HUAC: she gave the names of communists she probably did not like, and withheld the names of communists she probably did like".

== Television career ==
She returned to working as a talent agent in 1960, and represented actors including Robert Redford and James Garner. During this period she persuaded networks to buy the television series Julia, Hogan's Heroes, and Ben Casey. In 1963 she created Breaking Point, a spinoff of Ben Casey which starred Paul Richards as a resident psychiatrist at a fictional New York City hospital.

After representing James Garner for several years, she became a partner in his production company Cherokee Productions, which produced the TV series Nichols, The Rockford Files, and Bret Maverick. Rosenberg was nominated three times for an Emmy for her work on The Rockford Files, and won once. In addition to producing The Rockford Files, she also directed six episodes.

== Personal life ==
Rosenberg was married twice: to director Irving Reis, and to talent agent George Rosenberg. She had one child, an adopted daughter named Amy.

In her later years, Rosenberg was an amateur photographer whose works were exhibited at the Peter Fetterman Gallery in Santa Monica.

In the late 1990s, she began to experience blindness as a result of macular degeneration.
