= Deacon Blue discography =

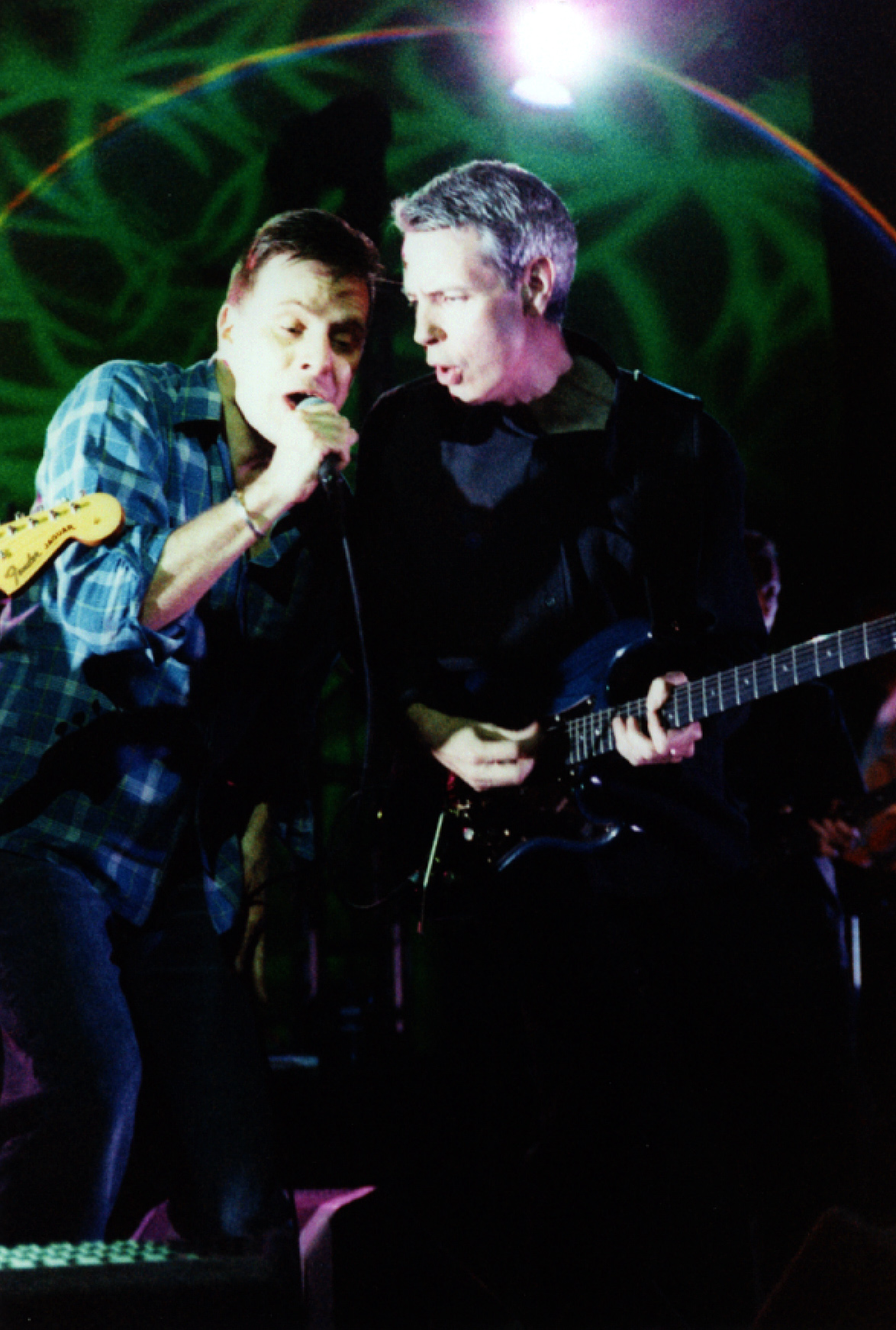
- Ricky Ross and Graeme Kelling of Deacon Blue at Glasgow's SECC (2001)
- Studio albums: 11
- Extended plays: 1
- Live albums: 2
- Compilation albums: 8
- Singles: 43
- Music videos: 43

The discography of Scottish band Deacon Blue consists of eleven studio albums, two live albums, eight compilation albums, and one album that is both a studio and a compilation album. As of 2020, Deacon Blue's total album sales stood at seven million, with twelve UK top 40 singles, along with two number one albums in the UK. Their debut album, Raintown (1987) reached number fourteen in the United Kingdom, and received a Platinum certification. It reached number fifty-four on the Dutch Album Top 100, and spawned the successful singles "Dignity", "Chocolate Girl" and "Loaded". Their follow up album, When the World Knows Your Name (1989), was a major success for the band, peaking at number one in the United Kingdom, achieving a double platinum certification. It charted in other European countries, including Sweden and Germany, and in international markets including Australia and New Zealand. Its lead single, "Real Gone Kid", peaked within the Top 10 of the UK Singles Chart, and peaked at number one in Spain and number five in New Zealand.

In 1991, they released their third album, Fellow Hoodlums, together with the singles "Your Swaying Arms", "Twist and Shout", "Closing Time" and "Cover from the Sky". In November 1992, they released the single "Your Town", the lead single from their fourth studio album Whatever You Say, Say Nothing (1993). The following singles to be released from Whatever You Say, Say Nothing – "Will We Be Lovers", "Only Tender Love" and "Hang Your Head" – all peaked within the Top 40 of the UK Singles Chart. In 1994, the band released the compilation Our Town – The Greatest Hits, which peaked at number one in both their native Scotland and the United Kingdom, and received a double platinum certification from the BPI. By 1994, the band had split, before reforming to release a new album, Homesick (2001).

A considerable break before the release of their next album, Deacon Blue released their sixth album in 2012. The Hipsters saw the band return to the Top 40 of the UK Albums Chart, their first since 1994, and in Scotland, it peaked at number nine on the Scottish Albums Chart. Its lead single of the same name peaked at number forty on the United Kingdom Independent Singles Chart. Subsequent album releases – A New House (2014), Believers (2016) and City of Love all charted within the top twenty of the UK Albums Chart. Riding on the Tide of Love, described by the band as a "companion piece" to City of Love, was released in 2021 and made the Top 10 of the Scottish Albums Chart. Their eleventh studio album, The Great Western Road was released in March 2025.

== Albums ==
=== Studio albums ===
Title	Album details	Peak chart positions									Certifications
Title	Album details	SCO	AUS	GER	NED	NZ	SPA	SWE	UK	UK Indie	Certifications
Raintown	Released: 26 May 1987; Label: Columbia (#450549); Formats: CD, LP, CS	—	—	—	54	—	—	—	14	41 (Note: Peaked in the UK independent albums chart at 41 on 28 October 2012 when re-released on CD by Edsel)	UK: Platinum
When the World Knows Your Name	Released: 3 April 1989; Label: Columbia (#463321); Formats: CD, LP, CS, MD	—	39	56	60	12	—	45	1	46 (Note: Peaked in the UK independent albums chart at 46 on 28 October 2012 when re-released on CD by Edsel)	UK: 2× Platinum
Fellow Hoodlums	Released: 3 June 1991; Label: Columbia (#450549); Formats: CD, LP, CS, MD	10	148	—	—	—	—	—	2	—	UK: Platinum
Whatever You Say, Say Nothing	Released: 1 March 1993; Label: Columbia (#473527); Formats: CD, LP, CS, MD	—	161	91	43	—	—	—	4	—	UK: Gold
Homesick	Released: 30 April 2001; Label: Papillon (#BTFLY0014); Formats: CD, CS	23	—	—	—	—	—	—	59	13	
The Hipsters	Released: 24 September 2012; Label: Demon Music Group, Edsel (#DEACON001); Formats: CD, LP	9	—	—	—	—	—	—	19	2	
A New House	Released: 8 September 2014; Label: Medium Wave (#DBANH001); Formats: CD, LP	8	—	—	—	—	—	—	17	2	
Believers	Released: 30 September 2016; Label: Earmusic (#211434EMU); Formats: CD, LP, CS	4	—	—	—	—	—	—	13	6	
City of Love	Released: 6 March 2020; Label: Earmusic (#0214560EMU); Formats: CD, LP, download	1	—	—	—	—	62	—	4	1	
Riding on the Tide of Love	Released: 5 February 2021; Label: Earmusic; Formats: CD, LP, download, streaming	2	—	—	—	—	—	—	23	3	
The Great Western Road	Released: 21 March 2025; Label: Cooking Vinyl; Formats: CD, LP, CS	1	—	—	—	—	—	—	3	2	
"—" denotes items that did not chart or were not released in that territory.

=== Part studio part compilation albums ===
Title	Album details	Peak chart positions	
Title	Album details	SCO	UK
Walking Back Home	Released: 11 October 1999; Label: Columbia (#4963802); Formats: CD, CS, MD	13	39

=== Live albums ===
Title	Album details	Peak chart positions
Title	Album details	UK Indie
Live	Released: 14 May 2008; Label: P3 Music (#P3M022); Formats: CD	—
Live at the Glasgow Barrowlands	Released: 31 March 2017; Label: Ear Music (#0211912EMU); Formats: CD, LP	22
"—" denotes items that did not chart or were not released in that territory.

=== Compilation albums ===
Title	Album details	Peak chart positions				Certifications
Title	Album details	SCO	EUR	IRE	UK	Certifications
Riches	Released: February 1988; Label: Columbia; Formats: CD, CS	—	—	—	—	
Ooh Las Vegas	Released: 22 September 1990; Label: Columbia (#467242); Formats: CD, LP, CS	—	—	—	3	UK: Gold
Our Town – The Greatest Hits	Released: 5 April 1994; Label: Columbia (#476642); Formats: CD, LP, CS, MD	1	9	7	1	UK: 2× Platinum
Riches & More	Released: 10 February 1997; Label: Columbia (#487147); Formats: CD	—	—	—	—	
The Very Best of Deacon Blue	Released: 5 November 2001; Label: Columbia (#504978); Formats: CD	88	—	—	148	UK: Silver
Singles	Released: 16 October 2006; Label: Columbia (#82876884872); Formats: CD	5	—	9	18	UK: Silver
Dignity - The Best of Deacon Blue	Released: 9 March 2009; Label: Camden (#88697449792); Formats: CD	—	—	—	—	UK: Silver
The Rest	Released: 29 October 2012; Label: Edsel (#EDSG8023); Formats: CD	—	—	—	—	
All The Old 45s – The Very Best	Released: 1 September 2023; Label: Cooking Vinyl Limited; Formats: CD, vinyl, digital download, streaming	2	—	—	42	
Peace Will Come	Released: 2024; Label: Cooking Vinyl Limited; Formats: Vinyl	—	—	—	—	
"—" denotes items that did not chart or were not released in that territory.

=== Extended plays ===
- 1990 Four Bacharach & David Songs

== Singles ==
Year	Title	Peak chart positions										Certifications	Album
Year	Title	SCO	AUS	GER	IRE	ITA	NED	NZ	SPA	UK	UK Indie	Certifications	Album
1987	"Dignity"	—	—	—	—	67	45	—	—	123	—	UK: Gold	Raintown
1987	"Loaded"	—	—	—	—	—	—	—	—	103	—		Raintown
1987	"When Will You (Make My Telephone Ring)"	—	—	—	—	—	—	—	—	86	—		Raintown
1988	"Dignity" (1st re-release)	—	—	—	—	—	—	—	—	31	—	UK: Gold	Raintown
1988	"When Will You (Make My Telephone Ring)" (re-release)	—	—	—	—	—	—	—	—	34	—		Raintown
1988	"Chocolate Girl"	—	—	—	—	—	—	—	—	43	—		Raintown
1988	"Real Gone Kid"	—	18	—	10	—	—	5	1	8	—	UK: Platinum	When the World Knows Your Name
1989	"Wages Day"	—	79	—	10	—	—	24	14	18	—		When the World Knows Your Name
1989	"Fergus Sings the Blues"	—	—	71	7	—	—	—	—	14	—		When the World Knows Your Name
1989	"Love and Regret"	—	—	—	10	—	—	—	—	28	—		When the World Knows Your Name
1989	"Queen of the New Year"	—	—	—	4	—	—	—	—	21	—		When the World Knows Your Name
1990	"I'll Never Fall in Love Again"	—	—	—	2	—	72	—	—	2	—		Four Bacharach & David Songs EP
1991	"Your Swaying Arms"	—	187	—	6	—	—	—	—	23	—		Fellow Hoodlums
1991	"Twist and Shout"	—	130	—	13	—	—	—	—	10	—		Fellow Hoodlums
1991	"Closing Time"	—	—	—	—	—	—	—	—	42	—		Fellow Hoodlums
1991	"Cover from the Sky"	—	—	—	—	—	—	—	—	31	—		Fellow Hoodlums
1992	"Your Town"	—	158	—	28	—	20	—	—	14	—		Whatever You Say, Say Nothing
1993	"Will We Be Lovers"	—	—	—	—	—	38	—	—	31	—		Whatever You Say, Say Nothing
1993	"Only Tender Love"	—	—	—	—	—	—	—	—	22	—		Whatever You Say, Say Nothing
1993	"Hang Your Head"	—	—	—	—	—	—	—	—	21	—		Whatever You Say, Say Nothing
1994	"I Was Right and You Were Wrong"	10	—	—	—	—	—	—	—	32	—		Our Town – The Greatest Hits
1994	"Dignity" (2nd re-release)	7	—	—	—	—	—	—	—	20	—		Our Town – The Greatest Hits
1999	"Love Hurts"	—	—	—	—	—	—	—	—	—	—		Walking Back Home
2001	"Everytime You Sleep"	44	—	—	—	—	—	—	—	64	11		Homesick
2001	"A is for Astronaut"	—	—	—	—	—	—	—	—	159	41		Homesick
2006	"Bigger Than Dynamite"	38	—	—	—	—	—	—	—	130	—		Singles
2006	"Real Gone Kid" (Shanghai Surprise Mixes)	—	—	—	—	—	—	—	—	—	—		Singles
2012	"The Hipsters"	—	—	—	—	—	—	—	—	—	40		The Hipsters
2012	"The Outsiders"	—	—	—	—	—	—	—	—	—	—		The Hipsters
2013	"That's What We Can Do"	—	—	—	—	—	—	—	—	—	—		The Hipsters
2013	"Turn" (remix)	—	—	—	—	—	—	—	—	—	—		The Hipsters
2013	"You'll Know It's Christmas"	74	—	—	—	—	—	—	—	—	15		Non-album single
2014	"A New House"	—	—	—	—	—	—	—	—	—	—		A New House
2014	"I Wish I Was a Girl Like You"	—	—	—	—	—	—	—	—	—	—		A New House
2014	"Bethlehem Begins"	—	—	—	—	—	—	—	—	—	—		A New House
2015	"Win"	—	—	—	—	—	—	—	—	—	—		A New House
2016	"The Believers"	—	—	—	—	—	—	—	—	—	—		Believers
2016	"This is a Love Song"	—	—	—	—	—	—	—	—	—	—		Believers
2016	"Gone"	—	—	—	—	—	—	—	—	—	—		Believers
2017	"I Will and I Won't"	—	—	—	—	—	—	—	—	—	—		Believers
2020	"City of Love"	—	—	—	—	—	—	—	—	—	—		City of Love
2021	"Riding on the Tide of Love"	—	—	—	—	—	—	—	—	—	—		Riding on the Tide of Love
2024	"Late '88"	—	—	—	—	—	—	—	—	— (Note: "Late '88" did not chart within the main UK Singles Chart, but did peak at number 69 on the UK Singles Downloads Chart and 73 on the UK Singles Sales Chart respectively)	—		The Great Western Road
"—" denotes items that did not chart or were not released in that territory.

== Videography ==
=== Videos ===
- 1990: The Big Picture (1989 Concert)
- 2006: The Bigger Picture (1989 Concert plus Music Videos up to 2006)
- 2008: Live (2007 Edinburgh Concert)
- 2017: Live at the Glasgow Barrowlands (included three music videos from the Believers album)

=== Music videos ===
- 1987: "Dignity" [Version 1]
- 1987: "Loaded"
- 1987: "When Will You (Make My Telephone Ring)"
- 1988: "Dignity" [Version 2]
- 1988: "Dignity" [Version 3]
- 1988: "Chocolate Girl"
- 1988: "Real Gone Kid" [Version 1]
- 1988: "Dignity" [Version 4]
- 1988: "Real Gone Kid" [Version 2]
- 1989: "Wages Day"
- 1989: "Fergus Sings the Blues"
- 1989: "Love and Regret"
- 1989: "Queen of the New Year"
- 1990: "I'll Never Fall in Love Again"
- 1991: "Your Swaying Arms"
- 1991: "A Brighter Star Than You Will Shine"
- 1991: "Twist and Shout"
- 1991: "Closing Time"
- 1991: "Cover from the Sky"
- 1992: "Your Town"
- 1993: "Will We Be Lovers"
- 1993: "Only Tender Love"
- 1993: "Hang Your Head"
- 1994: "I Was Right and You Were Wrong"
- 1999: "Love Hurts"
- 2001: "Everytime You Sleep"
- 2006: "Bigger Than Dynamite"
- 2012: "The Hipsters"
- 2012: "The Outsiders"
- 2013: "Turn"
- 2013: "You'll Know It's Christmas"
- 2014: "A New House"
- 2016: "The Believers"
- 2016: "This is a Love Song"
- 2017: "Gone"
