= Gregor Philp =

Scottish guitarist, songwriter and producer

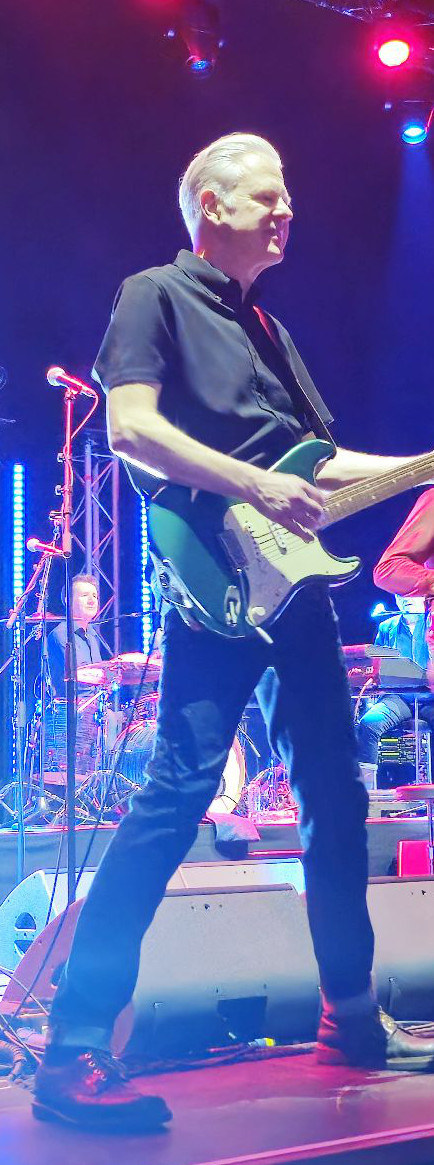
- Philp performing with Deacon Blue at the Usher Hall, Edinburgh, 2025

Background information
- Origin: Dundee, Scotland
- Genres: Pop, alternative rock, television soundtracks
- Occupations: Singer, musician, songwriter, producer
- Instruments: Guitar, keyboards, vocals
- Years active: 1984–present

Gregor Grant Philp is a Scottish guitarist, songwriter, and producer, best known for his role as the lead guitarist of the pop-rock band Deacon Blue. He joined the band in 2008, contributing lead guitar, songwriting, backing vocals, and production since 2012.

== Biography ==
=== Early life and career ===
Born in Dundee, Scotland, Philp began playing guitar at the age of 10 and started performing with local bands by his mid-teens. Before joining Deacon Blue, he collaborated with drummer Dougie Vipond in the band Swiss Family Orbison and worked extensively as a composer and music producer for television.

His television work includes musical contributions to TV shows such as Monarch of the Glen and Taggart, and children's TV shows Balamory and Me Too.

=== Deacon Blue (2008–present) ===
Philp started working with Deacon Blue in 2008, following the death of original guitarist Graeme Kelling. His first studio album with the band was The Hipsters (2012), where he co-wrote several tracks. He has since co-produced and co-written songs on subsequent albums, including A New House (2014), Believers (2016), City of Love (2020), Riding on the Tide of Love (2021), and The Great Western Road (2025). He also played on the live album and DVD Deacon Blue Live at the Glasgow Barrowlands (2017).

=== Other projects ===
Beyond Deacon Blue and featuring on Ricky Ross's solo work, Philp has collaborated with artists such as Eliza Wren Payne (a.k.a. Wrenne) and David Byrne. He has also been a member of the band Heavy Little Elephants.

== Personal life ==
Philp lives in Broughty Ferry, Dundee, Scotland.
