= Singles (Deacon Blue album) =

Greatest hits album by Deacon Blue
- Released: 16 October 2006
- Recorded: March 2006 (New Tracks)
- Genre: Pop, rock, blues, alternative rock
- Label: Sony BMG

Deacon Blue chronology
The Very Best of Deacon Blue (2001)	Singles (2006)	The Hipsters (2012)

Singles is a singles compilation by the Scottish rock band Deacon Blue. It contains three new tracks, "Bigger than Dynamite", "Haunted", and "The One About Loneliness", that were recorded by the band in March 2006.

== Track listing ==
All songs written by Ricky Ross, except where noted:

1. "Dignity" – 4:00
2. "Real Gone Kid" - 4:05
3. "Wages Day" – 3:11
4. "Fergus Sings the Blues" (Ross, Prime) - 3:51
5. "Twist and Shout" – 3:34
6. "Bigger than Dynamite - 3:26
7. "Your Swaying Arms" – 4:12
8. "Your Town" - 5:19
9. "I'll Never Fall in Love Again" (Bacharach, David) - 2:46
10. "Chocolate Girl" - 3:16
11. "When Will You (Make My Telephone Ring)" - 4:19
12. "Love and Regret" - 4:50
13. "I Was Right and You Were Wrong" - 4:52
14. "Loaded" (Prime, Ross, Kelling) – 4:30
15. "Queen of the New Year" (Ross, Prime) - 3:36
16. "Only Tender Love" - 5:06
17. "Cover from the Sky" – 3:37
18. "Haunted" - 4:17
19. "The One About Loneliness" - 3:59

== Personnel ==
- Ricky Ross – vocals, guitar, piano, keyboard
- Lorraine McIntosh – vocal
- James Prime – keyboard
- Ewen Vernal – bass
- Graeme Kelling – guitar
- Dougie Vipond – drums
