= Riches & More =

Compilation album by Deacon Blue
- Released: 10 February 1997
- Genre: Pop, rock, blues
- Label: Columbia

Deacon Blue chronology
Our Town - The Greatest Hits (1994)	Riches & More (1997)	Walking Back Home (1999)

Professional ratings
Review scores
Source	Rating
Allmusic	2/5 stars

Riches & More is a compilation album for the Scottish rock band Deacon Blue. It combines the Riches (a limited edition bonus album that was temporarily packaged with copies of the album Raintown) with the Four Bacharach & David Songs EP. However, this compilation does not include the piano version of the song "Raintown", which was the fifth track on the initial release of Riches.

== Track listing ==
All songs written by Ricky Ross, except where noted:

1. "Which Side Are You On" (F. Reece) – 2:59
2. "Kings of the Western World" – 2:39
3. "Angeliou" (Van Morrison) – 6:19
4. "Just Like Boys" (Ross, Prime) – 3:13
5. "Riches" – 2:39
6. "Church" – 3:18
7. "Shifting Sand" (Ross, Prime) – 3:18
8. "Suffering" – 2:44
9. "Ribbons and Bows" – 4:15
10. "Dignity [Bob Clearmountain Version]" – 4:13
11. "I'll Never Fall in Love Again" (Bacharach, David) – 2:46
12. "The Look of Love" (Bacharach, David) – 3:37
13. "Are You There (With Another Girl)" (Bacharach, David) – 3:22
14. "Message to Michael" (Bacharach, David) – 3:57
- Tracks 1, 7, and 8 produced by Deacon Blue
- Tracks 2, 5, 9, 11, 12, 13, and 14 produced by Jon Kelly
- Track 3 produced by Richard Moakes and Deacon Blue
- Track 4 produced by Jon Kelly with overdub and additional recording by Deacon Blue and Richard Moakes
- Track 6 produced by Kenny MacDonald and Deacon Blue
- Track 10 produced by Bob Clearmountain

== Personnel ==
- Ricky Ross – vocals, guitar, piano, keyboard
- Lorraine McIntosh – vocals
- James Prime – keyboard
- Ewen Vernal – bass
- Graeme Kelling – guitar
- Dougie Vipond – drums
