= James Prime =

Scottish musician (1960–2025)

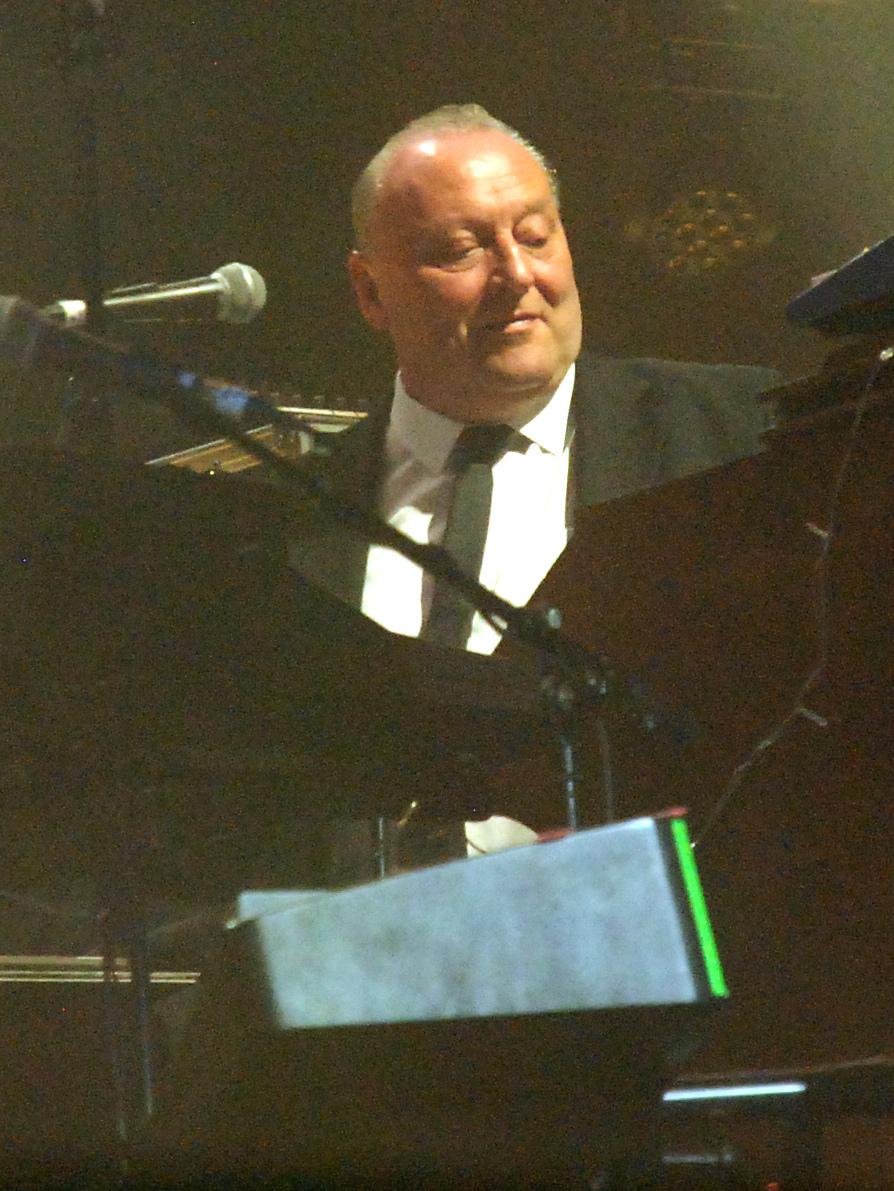
- Prime with Deacon Blue at SSE Hydro, 2018

Background information
- Also known as: Jim Prime
- Born: 3 November 1960; Kilmarnock, Ayrshire, Scotland
- Died: 19 June 2025 (aged 64) Ayr, Scotland
- Genres: Pop; alternative rock; soft rock
- Occupation: Musician
- Instruments: Keyboards; piano; bass; acoustic guitar; accordion
- Years active: 1979–2025
- Formerly of: Deacon Blue

James Miller Prime (3 November 1960 – 19 June 2025) was a Scottish musician, keyboardist and lecturer, who was best known as the keyboard player for rock band Deacon Blue which he joined in 1985, remaining a member until his death. He featured on all eleven of their studio albums, the most recent, The Great Western Road (2025), released three months prior to his death. Alongside his music career, he also lectured at the University of the West of Scotland.

== Early life ==
James Miller Prime was born in the town of Kilmarnock in Ayrshire on 3 November 1960. Prime's career began as a session musician on a tour of the United States in 1980 with the band Altered Images.

== Career ==
=== Deacon Blue (1985–2025) ===
In 1985, Prime joined the band Deacon Blue which was formed in Glasgow by Ricky Ross and comprised Prime on keyboards, Graeme Kelling on guitar, vocalist Lorraine McIntosh, bass guitarist Ewen Vernal and Dougie Vipond on drums. In 2013, their estimated album sales stood at six million, and by 2020 were estimated to have risen to in excess of seven million, with twelve UK top 40 singles, along with two number one albums in both the United Kingdom and their native Scotland.

The band released their debut album, Raintown (1987) to critical and commercial success, with their second album, When the World Knows Your Name (1989), topping the UK Albums Chart for two weeks. The single "Real Gone Kid" became their first top ten single in the UK Singles Chart and reached number one in Spain. Deacon Blue followed up the success of their first two albums with Fellow Hoodlums (1991) and Whatever You Say, Say Nothing (1993). The band split in 1994 until five years later, holding a reunion gig which led on to a new album, Walking Back Home (1999). The band released another album, Homesick (2001), the last to feature guitarist Graeme Kelling following his death from pancreatic cancer in 2004. In 2006, the band recorded three new songs for a Singles album – including the single "Bigger than Dynamite".

Deacon Blue returned after a period of absence to release The Hipsters (2012), their first studio album since Homesick in 2001. The band released a further four albums following their reunion – A New House, (2014), Believers (2016), City of Love (2020) and Riding on the Tide of Love (2021) to commercial success. In 2024, they released "Late 88" as the lead single from their eleventh studio album The Great Western Road (2025).

=== Other work ===
Prime went on to join a theatrical production of the experiences of a band of Govan boys in World War I entitled The Big Picnic (staged in the Harland & Wolff shipyard in Glasgow). During that time Prime was also enlisted as Hammond organ player for Johnny Hallyday and departed to France for a two-year stint with Hallyday's band. The band, accompanied by various guests (including Bryan Adams, Mick Jones) played a continuous sold-out 19 nights at the capacity Bercy Arena in Paris. He then worked with Hallyday on Lorada (1995) in the Guillaume Tell studios in Paris.

On his return, a call from Benny Gallagher led to Prime developing an idea to create a School of Music and Recording Technology (SMART). The University of Paisley (now the University of the West of Scotland) picked up on the idea, and now in its eleventh year, the Commercial Music course hosts 250 students. Lecturers include David Scott of The Pearlfishers, Paul McGeechan (Love and Money) Alan McCusker Thompson (The Painted Word), Allan Dumbreck (The Big Dish) and Jo Collinson-Scott (Jo Mango).

== Death ==
Prime died following a short battle with cancer in Ayr on 19 June 2025, at the age of 64.

== Discography ==
- Raintown (1987)
- When the World Knows Your Name (1989)
- Fellow Hoodlums (1991)
- Whatever You Say, Say Nothing (1993)
- Walking Back Home (1999)
- Homesick (2001)
- The Hipsters (2012)
- A New House (2014)
- Believers (2016)
- City of Love (2020)
- Riding on the Tide of Love (2021)
- The Great Western Road (2025)

== See also ==
- University of the West of Scotland; a university where Prime also lectured
