= Ooh Las Vegas =

Compilation album by Deacon Blue
- Released: 10 September 1990
- Recorded: 1988–1990
- Genre: Pop, rock, blues
- Length: 1:25:01
- Label: Columbia
- Producer: Deacon Blue, Various

Deacon Blue chronology
When the World Knows Your Name (1989)	Ooh Las Vegas (1990)	Fellow Hoodlums (1991)

Professional ratings
Review scores
Source	Rating
AllMusic	4/5 stars
Record Mirror	1/5 stars

Ooh Las Vegas is a compilation album by the Scottish rock band Deacon Blue. It contains B-sides, unreleased tracks, and songs written for William McIlvanney's television play Dreaming.

The Japanese release also included the four tracks from the Four Bacharach & David Songs EP.

== Track listing ==
All songs written by Ricky Ross, except where noted:

1. "Disneyworld [Remix]" – 2:49
2. "Ronnie Spector" (Ross, Kelling, Prime) – 3:29
3. "My America" (Ross, Prime) – 3:10
4. "S.H.A.R.O.N." – 4:13
5. "Undeveloped Heart" (Ross, Prime) – 4:59
6. "Souvenirs" – 2:41
7. "Born Again" (Hayes, Porter) – 3:23
8. "Down in the Flood" (Ross, Prime, Deacon Blue) – 4:33
9. "Back Here in Beanoland" – 3:01
10. "Love You Say" (Ross, McIlvanney) – 5:34
11. "Let Your Hearts Be Troubled" (Ross, McIlvanney) – 6:31
12. "Gentle Teardrops" – 3:13
13. "Little Lincoln" – 3:06
14. "That Country (Beneath Your Skin)" – 3:50
15. "Is It Cold Beneath the Hill?" (McIntosh, Prime, McIlvanney) – 3:57
16. "Circus Lights (Acoustic Version)" – 2:56
17. "Trampolene" (Cope) – 3:36
18. "Las Vegas" – 3:55
19. "Killing the Blues" (McIlvanney, Ross) – 3:49
20. "Long Window to Love" – 3:12
21. "Christine" – 2:26
22. "Take Me to the Place" (Ross, traditional arr.) – 2:26
23. "Don't Let the Teardrops Start" – 3:01

== Personnel ==
- Ricky Ross – vocals, guitar, piano, keyboards
- Lorraine McIntosh – vocals
- James Prime – keyboards
- Ewen Vernal – bass
- Graeme Kelling – guitar
- Dougie Vipond – drums
