= The Rest =

Compilation album by Deacon Blue
- Released: 29 October 2012
- Recorded: 1990–2006
- Genre: Alternative rock, pop
- Label: Demon, Edsel

Deacon Blue chronology
| The Hipsters (2012) | The Rest (2012) | A New House (2014) |

The Rest is a compilation album released by the Scottish band Deacon Blue in October 2012. It is part of the band's catalogue reissue program.

The Rest, as the title implies, contains tracks that were not necessarily associated with the studio albums, such as the Four Bacharach & David Songs EP and the Walking Back Home compilation. It also includes the new tracks featured on the band's 1994 and 2006 greatest hits compilations.

The Rest is also the title of a song from the band's most recent studio album, The Hipsters.

== Track listing ==
Disc 1
| No. | Title | Length |
|---|---|---|
| 1. | "I'll Never Fall In Love Again" | 2:49 |
| 2. | "Look of Love" | 3:38 |
| 3. | "Are You There (With Another Girl)?" | 3:23 |
| 4. | "Message to Michael" | 4:00 |
| 5. | "I Was Right and You Were Wrong" | 4:51 |
| 6. | "Bound to Love" | 4:26 |
| 7. | "Still In the Mood" | 4:02 |
| 8. | "Fergus Sings the Blues" (Live) | 4:05 |
| 9. | "Loaded" (Live) | 3:44 |
| 10. | "Chocolate Girl" (Live) | 6:23 |
| 11. | "Beautiful Stranger" | 3:54 |
| 12. | "Waves of Sorrow" (Piano & Vocal Version) | 3:25 |
| 13. | "Bethlehem's Gate" (Piano & Vocal Version) | 3:34 |
| 14. | "I Was Right and You Were Wrong" (Extended Version) | 5:34 |
| 15. | "Mexico Rain" | 4:04 |
| 16. | "Goin' Back" (Live) | 3:24 |
| 17. | "Wages Day" (Piano Version) | 3:19 |

Disc 2
| No. | Title | Length |
|---|---|---|
| 1. | "Love Hurts" | 4:25 |
| 2. | "Jesus Do Your Hands Still Feel the Rain?" | 5:13 |
| 3. | "Christmas and Glasgow" | 5:13 |
| 4. | "When You Are Young" | 3:49 |
| 5. | "Plastic Shoes" | 3:41 |
| 6. | "All I Want" | 4:45 |
| 7. | "Walking Back Home" | 5:01 |
| 8. | "Bigger Than Dynamite" | 3:27 |
| 9. | "Haunted" | 4:18 |
| 10. | "The One About Loneliness" | 3:59 |
| 11. | "Deportee" (Live) | 6:28 |
| 12. | "Wild Horses" (Live) | 5:33 |

DVD: Music Videos
| No. | Title | Length |
|---|---|---|
| 1. | "I'll Never Fall In Love Again" |
| 2. | "I Was Right and You Were Wrong" |
| 3. | "Love Hurts" |
| 4. | "Bigger Than Dynamite" |
