= So Long Ago =

Studio album by Ricky Ross
- Released: 1984
- Recorded: 1983
- Genre: Pop, Rock
- Length: 42:20
- Label: Sticky Music
- Producer: Ricky Ross

Ricky Ross chronology
So Long Ago (1984)	What You Are (1996)

So Long Ago is the solo debut album from Scottish rock musician Ricky Ross. Ross later founded Deacon Blue.

== Track listing ==
All songs written by Ricky Ross:

1. "Something About Ireland" – 2:37
2. "A Week in Politics" – 4:44
3. "Checkout Girls" – 3:24
4. "Don't Look Back" – 4:17
5. "Little India" – 3:20
6. "Surprised by Joy" – 4:01
7. "Some People Last Winter" – 3:13
8. "Vision On" – 4:38
9. "I Love You Like a Son" – 3:55
10. "The Germans Are Out Today" – 5:56
11. "Chairman Mao's Vacation" – 1:55

== Personnel ==
- Ricky Ross – vocals, keyboards, producer
- Graeme Duffin – guitar
- Craig Smillie – guitar
- Malcolm Lindsay – guitar
- Stuart Duffin – bass
- Ewen Vernal – bass
- Malcom Duffin – drums
- Zara Ross – accordion
- Carol Moore – backing vocals
