= Walking Back Home =

Studio album by Deacon Blue
- Released: 11 October 1999
- Genre: Pop, rock
- Label: Sony Music Entertainment
- Producer: Deacon Blue, Jon Kelly, Steve Osborne, Warne Livesey

Deacon Blue chronology
Riches & More (1997)	Walking Back Home (1999)	Homesick (2001)

Professional ratings
Review scores
Source	Rating
Allmusic	3/5 stars

Walking Back Home is an album by Scottish pop rock band Deacon Blue released in 1999. It was their first album since reforming that year after disbanding in 1994. A part studio/part compilation album, it contains nine of their earlier songs coupled with eight brand-new or previously unreleased songs.

== Track listing ==
All songs written by Ricky Ross, except where noted:

1. "Love Hurts" (Bryant, Acuff-Rose) — 4:24
2. "Jesus Do Your Hands Still Feel the Rain" — 5:14
3. "The Very Thing" — 3:35
  - from the album Raintown
4. "The Day that Jackie Jumped the Jail" — 3:55
  - from the album Fellow Hoodlums
5. "Love and Regret" — 5:02
  - from the album When the World Knows Your Name
6. "Christmas and Glasgow" — 5:12
  - from the Oscar Marzaroli tribute album The Tree and the Bird and the Fish and the Bell
7. "The Wildness" (Ross, Prime) — 5:48
  - from the album Fellow Hoodlums
8. "When You Are Young" — 3:49
9. "Love's Great Fears" — 2:44
  - from the album Raintown
10. "Chocolate Girl" — 3:17
  - from the album Raintown
11. "Plastic Shoes" — 3:40
12. "A Brighter Star than You Will Shine" (Ross, Prime) — 4:38
  - from the album Fellow Hoodlums
13. "Beautiful Stranger" (Ross, Prime) — 3:55
  - previously only available as a B-side and a bonus track on the vinyl LP version of Our Town - The Greatest Hits
14. "All I Want" — 4:44
15. "When Will You (Make My Telephone Ring) [Edit]" — 4:21
  - from the album Raintown
16. "Walking Back Home" — 5:01
17. "I'll Never Fall in Love Again" (Bacharach, David) — 2:46
  - from the Four Bacharach & David Songs EP
- Tracks 1, 2, 6, 8, 11, 14, and 16 produced by Deacon Blue
- Tracks 3, 4, 7, 9, 10, 12, 15, and 17 produced by Jon Kelly
- Track 5 produced by Warne Livesey
- Track 13 produced by Steve Osborne

== Personnel ==
=== Deacon Blue ===
- Ricky Ross — vocals
- Lorraine McIntosh — vocals
- James Prime — keyboards
- Ewen Vernal — bass
- Graeme Kelling — guitar
- Douglas Vipond — drums

=== Other personnel ===
- Mick Slaven — guitar on "Jesus Do Your Hands Still Feel the Rain", "Plastic Shoes" and "Love Hurts"
- Brian Docherty — bass on "Jesus Do Your Hands Still Feel the Rain"
- Gavin Wright — fiddle on "The Wildness" and "When You Are Young"

== Song Commentary ==
Quotes from Ricky Ross included in liner notes:

=== Jesus Do Your Hands Still Feel the Rain ===
"'Jesus Do Your Hands Still Feel the Rain' was written for a film commission in 94 just as the band was about to fold. We did have a go at recording it but, in hindsight, didn't make the best job of it. The song was dropped from the film and despite visiting it occasionally in the years between I've never found a good arrangement. This time Ewen was on holiday and it seems to have made all the difference... Listen carefully and you hear him putting 10p in the phone as he drops in a bass part (turn it up very loud and you'll hear the organ at Blackpool Tower)."

=== Christmas and Glasgow ===
"'Christmas and Glasgow' was recorded at CaVa — Robin Rankine must have been involved — and I'm sure Rachel Smillie played that whistle. It was only available before on the Oscar Marzaroli tribute record — you can see his work on this sleeve and a few others from our early days."

=== When You Are Young ===
"'When You Are Young' was recorded as part of Fellow Hoodlums and played a good deal live at that time. Most of this is the original live take with Gavin Wright's fiddle added before we mixed."

=== Beautiful Stranger ===
"'Beautiful Stranger' was recorded in a mill in Cookham and finished in Eden . . . that's in London . . . around 1993. It was only previously available to vinyl junkies . . . and predates any Madonna song of the same name and mentions the island of Gigha which no Madonna song I know ever did."

=== All I Want ===
"'All I Want' started life as a possible track for the last studio album [Whatever You Say, Say Nothing] then got left behind. For technophobes this is from a rough mix, an old DAT and no one remembers when we recorded it or who pressed the red button — but it's as good as anything else here"

=== Walking Back Home ===
"'Walking Back Home' was recorded at CaVa . . . that's in Glasgow with Ewen, Doug and myself and later Graeme and Lorraine overdubbing. Where was Jim? . . . I want to dedicate this to two of the people mentioned on the track: Warbeck and Linda . . . we all sang and we'll keep on singing."
