= Hang Your Head =

1993 single by Deacon Blue

- Cover of CD single

Single by Deacon Blue

from the album Whatever You Say, Say Nothing
- B-side: "Freedom Train"; "Here on the Wind"; "Indigo Sky"
- Released: 5 July 1993
- Length: 4:13
- Label: Columbia
- Songwriter: Ricky Ross
- Producers: Steve Osborne; Paul Oakenfold

Deacon Blue singles chronology
"Only Tender Love" (1993)	"Hang Your Head" (1993)	"I Was Right and You Were Wrong" (1994)

Music video
- "Hang Your Head" on YouTube

"Hang Your Head" is the fourth and final single from Scottish band Deacon Blue's fourth studio album, Whatever You Say, Say Nothing (1993). It was written by Ricky Ross and produced by Steve Osborne and Paul Oakenfold. The single version was released in July 1993 by Columbia Records and is very similar to the album version, except that it has a slightly longer introduction and also has a cold start in place of the album version's fade-in. This was the first Deacon Blue single release to exclude all vinyl formats. It reached a peak of number 21 on the UK Singles Chart in July 1993.

== B-sides ==
The first B-side is the upbeat rock song, "Freedom Train", which is an original composition by the band, but is only presented in a live version. The other two B-sides are the soaring "Here on the Wind" and Ricky and Lorraine's gentle duet, "Indigo Sky", both of which contain imagery related to the biblical account of Adam and Eve. "Indigo Sky" would later be released on The Very Best of Deacon Blue.

As with the previous release, "Only Tender Love", a special-edition CD single entitled "The Riches Collection Part 2" was issued. In addition to "Hang Your Head", it again contained three tracks from the Riches bonus album.

== Track listings ==
All songs were written by Ricky Ross except where noted.

Cassette single (659460 4)

1. "Hang Your Head [Single Version]" – 4:13
2. "Freedom Train (Live From The Hamburg Markthalle, Germany, 08.06.93)" – 2:56
3. "Here on the Wind" – 5:07
4. "Indigo Sky" – 2:48

CD single (659460 2)

1. "Hang Your Head [Single Version]" – 4:13
2. "Freedom Train (Live From The Hamburg Markthalle, Germany, 08.06.93)" – 2:56
3. "Here on the Wind" – 5:07
4. "Indigo Sky" – 2:48

Special Edition CD single: The Riches Collection Part 2 (659460 5)

1. "Hang Your Head [Single Version]" – 4:13
2. "Ribbons and Bows" – 4:18
3. "Just Like Boys" (Ross, Prime) – 3:17
4. "Church" – 3:18

== Charts ==
Chart (1993)	Peak position
Europe (Eurochart Hot 100)	65
UK Singles (OCC)	21
UK Airplay (Music Week)	37
