= What You Are (album) =

Studio album by Ricky Ross
- Released: 1996
- Recorded: April – October 1995
- Genre: Rock; alternative rock
- Label: Epic
- Producer: Bruce Robb; Dee Robb; Joe Robb

Ricky Ross chronology
So Long Ago (1984)	What You Are (1996)	New Recording (1997)

What You Are is the second solo album by Scottish rock musician Ricky Ross. It was released in 1996 on the Epic Records label, 12 years after his debut solo album, So Long Ago (1984). What You Are was the first solo album Ross released after the breakup of the band he fronted, Deacon Blue.

The album's music marked a significant departure from the sound of Deacon Blue, introducing a harder edge and an increased emphasis on aggressive guitar work.

Two singles released from the album reached the UK Singles Chart top 75: "Radio On" peaked at number 35 and "Good Evening Philadelphia" peaked at number 58.

== Track listing ==
All songs written by Ricky Ross, except where noted.

1. "Good Evening Philadelphia" – 3:16
2. "Icarus" – 2:36
3. "Cold Easter" (Ross, Mick Slaven) – 2:52
4. "What You Are" – 4:42
5. "Radio On" – 4:08
6. "When Sinners Fall" – 4:37
7. "Jack Singer" – 3:25
8. "The Lovers" (Ross, Slaven) – 4:10
9. "Wake Up and Dream" – 3:50
10. "Rosie Gordon Lies So Still" – 4:11
11. "Promise You Rain" – 3:42
12. "Love Isn't Hard It's Strong" – 3:18

== Personnel ==
- Ricky Ross – vocals, keyboards, guitar
- Mick Slaven – guitar
- Jeff "Skunk" Baxter – guitar, pedal steel
- Dan Root – guitar
- Mark Harris – bass
- Scott Crago – drums, percussion
- Joey Waronker – drums
- Patrick Warren – Chamberlin
- John Wittenberg – violin
- Xiou Niu Ho – violin
- Helene Wittenberg – viola
- Glenn Grab – cello
- Lorraine McIntosh – backing vocals on "Wake Up and Dream"

== Charts ==
Chart performance for What You Are
Chart (1996)	Peak position
Scottish Albums (OCC)	19
UK Albums (OCC)	36
