= Your Town =

1992 single by Deacon Blue

Single by Deacon Blue

from the album Whatever You Say, Say Nothing
- B-side: "Almost Beautiful"; "I've Been Making Such a Fool"
- Released: 16 November 1992
- Length: 5:21 (album version); 3:49 (7-inch version)
- Label: Columbia
- Songwriter: Ricky Ross
- Producers: Steve Osborne; Paul Oakenfold

Deacon Blue singles chronology
"Cover from the Sky" (1991)	"Your Town" (1992)	"Will We Be Lovers" (1993)

Music video
- "Your Town" on YouTube

"Your Town" is the first single from Scottish band Deacon Blue's fourth studio album, Whatever You Say, Say Nothing (1993). It is written by Ricky Ross and produced by Steve Osborne and Paul Oakenfold. Additional versions of the single release contain various dance remixes of "Your Town". Released in November 1992 by Columbia Records, it peaked at number 14 on the UK Singles Chart.

== Track listings ==
All songs written by Ricky Ross, except where noted:

=== UK release ===
- 7-inch single (658786 7)
1. "Your Town" [7-inch version] – 3:49
2. "Almost Beautiful" – 4:19
- 12-inch single (658786 6)
1. "Your Town" (Perfecto mix) – 6:27
2. "Your Town" (album version) – 5:21
- Cassette single (658786 4)
1. "Your Town" [7-inch version] – 3:49
2. "Almost Beautiful" – 4:19
- CD single (658786 2)
1. "Your Town" [7-inch version] – 3:49
2. "Almost Beautiful" – 4:19
3. "I've Been Making Such a Fool" – 2:25

=== US release ===
- CD single (Chaos 42K 74959)
1. "Your Town" (Euro 7-inch) – 3:49
2. "Your Town" (Barrio Mix radio edit) – 4:09
3. "Your Town" (Perfecto mix) – 6:28
4. "Your Town" (Relaxation dub) – 6:08
5. "Your Town" (Barrio mix instrumental) – 6:05

== Charts ==
Chart (1992–1993)	Peak position
Australia (ARIA)	158
Ireland (IRMA)	28
Netherlands (Dutch Top 40)	17
Netherlands (Single Top 100)	20
UK Singles (Official Charts)	14
UK Airplay (Music Week)	2
UK Dance (Music Week)	17
UK Club Chart (Music Week)	70
US Dance Club Play (Billboard)	6
US Maxi-Singles Sales (Billboard)	39
US Modern Rock Tracks (Billboard)	27

== Release history ==
Region	Date	Format(s)	Label(s)	Ref.
United Kingdom	16 November 1992	7-inch vinyl; CD; cassette	Columbia	
Australia	21 February 1993	CD; cassette	Columbia	
