= The Hipsters (song) =

Single by Deacon Blue

from the album The Hipsters
- Released: September 23, 2012
- Recorded: 2011–2012
- Genre: Alternative rock, pop rock
- Length: 3:19
- Label: Demon, Edsel
- Songwriters: Ricky Ross; Lorraine McIntosh
- Producer: Ricky Ross

Deacon Blue singles chronology
"Bigger Than Dynamite" (2006)	"The Hipsters" (2012)	"The Outsiders" (2012)

"The Hipsters" is a 2012 single released by Scottish band Deacon Blue released as the first single from the album of the same name, released in the United Kingdom on 23 November 2012. The single marked a comeback for Deacon Blue after a six-year hiatus, with their last release in 2006 with "Bigger Than Dynamite".

== Release ==
The single was released as the lead single from Deacon Blue's comeback album, The Hipsters which was released in 2012.

== Reception ==
Al Fox of the BBC said that "The lead single and title track provides the promise of optimistic, sunlit, indie-flecked arrangements, which does follow through for the most part."

MusicRiot said of the song "The Hipsters” is one of the best singles I’ve heard this year and a great summer song; it's just a shame that we didn't have a summer to do it justice. It's also ironic because Deacon Blue were never hipsters and no amount of sales would make them hip; but that's probably why we loved them so much".

== Music video ==
The young boy in the music video preparing to jump into the pool from the diving board after being chased by other children

The music video for the song features a young boy dressed in school uniform being chased by other children through the complex of a swimming pool. The video focuses on the boy's chase from the other children, who eventually climbs the stairs leading up to the pool where he is joined by another boy from the group of children chasing him. Realising he is trapped and cannot escape, the young boy being chased dives backwards off the diving board fully clothed, with the video ending showing the boy in the pool smiling.

The music video does not feature any members of Deacon Blue, instead focusing solely on the children in the video, particularly the young boy being chased through the swimming pool complex. The video focuses primarily on the chase and the aftermath of the boy being chased before the video concluding with the boy in the swimming pool.

The video was shot in Crystal Palace swimming pool in 2012.

== Track listing ==
1. "The Hipsters"

== Chart performance ==
Chart (2012)	Peak position
United Kingdom Independent Singles (OCC)	40
