= What You Are =

What You Are may refer to:

- "What You Are" (Audioslave song), 2004
- "What You Are" (Lionel Richie song), 2006
- What You Are (album), a 1996 album by Ricky Ross
- "What You Are", a song by Dave Matthews Band from the 2001 album Everyday
- "What You Are", a song by Jewel from the 2010 album Sweet and Wild
