= Late '88 =

Single by Deacon Blue

from the album The Great Western Road
- Released: 29 November 2024
- Length: 4:10
- Label: Cooking Vinyl
- Songwriter: Ricky Ross
- Producers: Ricky Ross, Gregor Philp

Deacon Blue singles chronology
"Riding on the Tide of Love" (2021)	"Late '88" (2024)

"Late '88" is a single by the Scottish pop-rock band Deacon Blue, released on 29 November 2024 as the lead single from their eleventh studio album The Great Western Road (2025). The release of the single coincided with the 40-year anniversary of the band’s formation, when vocalist Ricky Ross met drummer Dougie Vipond.

== Release ==
Upon release, "Late ’88" was selected as Record of the Week and added to the A-list by BBC Radio 2.

== Critical response ==
The song was placed on the BBC Radio 2 A-list for six weeks. At a live performance reviewed by The Guardian at Brighton Centre, “Late ’88” was described as "a sweet slice of disco-infused pop," accompanied by nostalgic visuals of the band's youth.

== Commercial performance ==
"Late 88" debuted at number 73 on the UK Singles Sales Chart and 69 on the UK Singles Downloads Chart in the week of 30 January 2025, spending one week on each chart.

== Charts ==
Chart (1992)	Peak position
UK Singles Sales (OCC)	73
UK Download Singles (OCC)	69
