= City of Love (album) =

Studio album by Deacon Blue
- Released: 6 March 2020
- Recorded: 2019
- Studio: Gorbals, Glasgow
- Genre: Pop; rock; soul
- Length: 44:03
- Label: Earmusic
- Producer: Gregor Philp; Ricky Ross

Deacon Blue chronology
Believers (2016)	City of Love (2020)	Riding on the Tide of Love (2021)

City of Love is the ninth studio album by Scottish pop rock band Deacon Blue, released through Earmusic on 6 March 2020. It is their first album since 2016's Believers. It was promoted by the lead single, the title track "City of Love".

== Background ==
Singer Ricky Ross said he thought it would be interesting to record the album in the Gorbals area "right in the heart of Glasgow" after learning that "there are bones reputedly belonging to St Valentine in St Francis' church" there.

== Critical reception ==
Professional ratings
Review scores
Source	Rating
The Scotsman	4/5 stars

Reviewing the album for PopMatters, Adam Mason wrote that it features "11 open-hearted and largely sentimental songs with big choruses and traditional rock instruments", describing the band as having written "crowd-pleasers [...] with a firm eye on recapturing their glory days. They aim for singalong tunes that will stand proud with old favorites at their outdoor shows this summer". Brett Callwood of LA Weekly found City of Love to be free of filler, writing that "everything that made their past work so special shines here too [...] It all sounds so effortless, nothing is forced, and yet it's clear that they worked hard about this slab of work". Writing for Belfast Telegraph, Steve Grantham called the album a "solid, well-produced set, with big choruses where they are needed and more subtle contemplation when not. It will, no doubt, please the band's fans and may, given enough exposure, gain them some more."

== Track listing ==
City of Love track listing
No.	Title	Writer(s)	Length
1.	"City of Love"	Ricky Ross	4:12
2.	"Hit Me Where It Hurts"	Ross; Gregor Philp	3:13
3.	"Weight of the World"	Ross	3:39
4.	"Take Me"	Ross; Gregor Philp	3:54
5.	"In Our Room"	Ross; Philp; James Prime	4:09
6.	"Intervals"	Ross	3:36
7.	"Keeping My Faith Alive"	Ross; Philp; Gordon Kennedy	3:10
8.	"A Walk in the Woods"	Ross	3:57
9.	"Come on In"	Ross; Philp	3:26
10.	"Wonderful"	Ross; Philp; Aaron Espe	3:36
11.	"On Love"	Ross	7:11
Total length:			44:03

== Personnel ==
=== Deacon Blue ===
- Lewis Gordon – vocals, acoustic guitar, bass guitar
- Lorraine McIntosh – vocals, tambourine
- Gregor Philp – vocals, accordion, guitar, keyboards, production
- James Prime – vocals, keyboards
- Ricky Ross – vocals, piano, production
- Dougie Vipond – vocals, drums, percussion

=== Additional contributors ===
- Andrew Mitchell – bass guitar
- Conor Smith – pedal steel
- The Pumpkinseeds – strings
  - Pete Harvey – cello, string arrangements
  - Seonaid Aitken – viola
  - Kate Miguda – violin
  - Simon Graham – violin
- Andy Baldwin – mastering
- Ash Howes – mixing, programming
- Kevin Burleigh – engineering
- Mark Seager – band photo

== Charts ==
Chart performance for City of Love
Chart (2020)	Peak position
Scottish Albums (OCC)	1
Spanish Albums (PROMUSICAE)	50
UK Albums (OCC)	4
