= Riding on the Tide of Love =

Studio album by Deacon Blue
- Released: 5 February 2021
- Recorded: 2019–2020
- Studio: The Poor House; Rock Nowe
- Length: 30:07
- Label: Earmusic
- Producer: Ricky Ross

Deacon Blue chronology
| City of Love (2020) | Riding on the Tide of Love (2021) | The Great Western Road (2025) |

Riding on the Tide of Love is the tenth studio album by Scottish band Deacon Blue released on 5 February 2021. The lead single from the album, the title track "Riding on the Tide of Love", was released on 27 November 2020.

== Background and recording ==
=== Background of the album ===
Speaking about the release of Riding on the Tide of Love, lead singer Ricky Ross said: "We never expected to be here, but here we are [with the album]. When we released City of Love back in March 2020 we celebrated it getting to number one in Scotland and number four in the UK, we were looking forward to a summer of festivals followed by a big tour at the end of the year. As we all know, that didn’t happen and once the dust had settled we realised we weren't going to be going out on the road any time soon. Riding On The Tide Of Love is a continuation of City Of Love, a companion piece that we recorded piece by piece, going into the studio one by one to record our individual parts. In its own way it’s brought us all together, we hope it will bring you together too".

=== Recording ===
Three songs from the album, "Look Up", "Send a Note Out" and "She Loved the Snow", were written and recorded for the band's previous album, City of Love, but did not make the final cut for the album. The band decided to re-record these songs for inclusion on Riding on the Tide of Love instead.

Due to the COVID-19 pandemic in Scotland, each of the band members had to record the tracks for the album individually, citing that, despite this, the band had never felt "closer together" and "more connected". Lead singer Ricky Ross said: "The band went into the studio one by one to record our individual parts. In its own way it's brought us all together".

== Critical reception ==
Professional ratings
Review scores
| Source | Rating |
|---|---|
| AllMusic | 3.5/5 stars |

Reviews of the album were mostly positive. Garry Bushell from The Express said "Riding On The Tide Of Love continues in the rich vein of last year’s City Of Love. Three of these songs came from the same recording sessions. None of them are fillers. However, none are in the same league as Dignity, which managed to be both morose and uplifting, or Your Town which made gloom danceable. But Deacon Blue have the rare ability to make love, hope, heartbreak, nostalgia and even rage catchy. The one thing you can bank on is that they remain true to themselves."

AllMusic awarded the album 3.5 out of 5 stars, writing of the album: "Riding on the Tide of Love almost whispers to a close with the jazzy, romantic pop ballad "It's Still Early." These eight songs are a stellar thematic follow-up to The City of Love. That said, they stand on their own as a single, musically sophisticated, emotionally direct, remarkably cohesive document that desires to provide safe haven in a dark age—especially given the piecemeal origins of these sessions."

Fiona Shephard from The Scotsman said: "Riding on the Tide of Love is a continuation, featuring three tracks recorded during the City of Love sessions and others polished up incrementally, with each musician heading into the studio to record their part in isolation. The result is a mellow companion piece, gentle, unhurried, simple, effective and, given its piecemeal gestation, admirably cohesive."

== Commercial performance ==
Riding on the Tide of Love debuted at number 23 on the UK Albums Chart, spending one week on the chart before dropping out of the top 100. In their native Scotland, the album debuted at number two on the Scottish Albums Chart on the week 12 February 2021. By the following week, the album fell to number eighteen and by one place to number nineteen the following week.

== Tour ==
To support the album, Deacon Blue have announced the Riding on the Tide of Love 2021 Tour.

- 6 June – Centre, Brighton
- 7 June – Royal Albert Hall, London
- 18 June – Blenheim Palace, Woodstock (Simple Minds support)
- 1 August – Valley Fest, Somerset
- 8 August – Lamplight Festival, Sunderland
- 3 November – TivoliVredenbrg, Utrecht, Netherlands
- 4 November – Metropol, Berlin, Germany
- 5 November – Kantine, Cologne, Germany
- 8 November – City Hall, Newcastle
- 9 November – City Hall, Newcastle
- 10 November – Opera House, Blackpool
- 12 November – Corn Exchange, Cambridge
- 13 November – Cliffs Pavilion, Southend
- 15 November – Guildhall, Portsmouth
- 16 November – Guildhall, Portsmouth
- 18 November – New Theatre, Oxford
- 19 November – Resorts World Arena, Birmingham
- 20 November – M&S Bank Arena, Liverpool
- 22 November – Motorpoint Arena, Cardiff
- 23 November – Pavilions, Plymouth
- 24 November – Eventim, Apollo, London
- 26 November – First Direct Arena, Leeds
- 27 November – Bonus Arena, Hull
- 28 November – Royal Concert Hall, Nottingham
- 30 November – 02 Apollo, Manchester
- 1 December – 02 Apollo, Manchester
- 2 December – 02 Apollo, Manchester
- 4 December – City Hall, Sheffield
- 7 December – Concert Hall, Perth
- 8 December – Usher Hall, Edinburgh
- 10 December – Caird Hall, Dundee
- 11 December – Leisure Centre, Inverness
- 14 December – Olympia, Dublin
- 15 December – Olympia, Dublin
- 16 December – Ulster Hall, Belfast
- 18 December – P&J Arena, Aberdeen
- 19 December – OVO Hydro, Glasgow

== Track listing ==
Riding on the Tide of Love track listing
| No. | Title | Writer(s) | Length |
|---|---|---|---|
| 1. | "Riding on the Tide of Love" | Ricky Ross, Lorraine McIntosh | 3:53 |
| 2. | "She Loved the Snow" (Previously recorded for City of Love) | Ricky Ross | 3:37 |
| 3. | "Nothing's Changed" | Ricky Ross | 3:17 |
| 4. | "Look Up" (Previously recorded for City of Love) | Ricky Ross | 4:04 |
| 5. | "Time" | Ricky Ross, Gregor Philp | 4:35 |
| 6. | "Send a Note Out" (Previously recorded for City of Love) | Ricky Ross | 3:23 |
| 7. | "Not Gonna Be That Girl" | Ricky Ross, Gregor Philp, Tia Sillers | 4:43 |
| 8. | "It's Still Early" | Ricky Ross, Gregor Philp | 2:59 |
| Total length: | | | 30:07 |

== Personnel ==
Deacon Blue

- Ricky Ross – vocals, piano, production
- Lorraine McIntosh – vocals, tambourine
- James Prime – keyboards
- Dougie Vipond – drums, percussion

Additional contributors

- Gregor Philp – vocals, guitars, keyboards, additional production, mixing on all tracks except "Riding on the Tide of Love"
- Lewis Gordon – bass guitar
- Ash Howes – mixing and additional programming on "Ride on the Tide of Love"
- Andy "Hippy" Baldwin – mastering
- d8.uk – album artwork
- Mark K. Seager – band photography

== Charts ==
Chart performance for Riding on the Tide of Love
| Chart (2021) | Peak position |
|---|---|
| Scottish Albums (OCC) | 2 |
| UK Albums (OCC) | 23 |
| UK Independent Albums (OCC) | 3 |
