= I Was Right and You Were Wrong =

1994 single by Deacon Blue

- Cover of 7-inch single

Single by Deacon Blue

from the album Our Town - The Greatest Hits
- B-side: "Mexico Rain"; "Goin' Back"
- Released: 21 March 1994
- Length: 4:13
- Label: Columbia
- Songwriter: Ricky Ross
- Producer: Steve Osborne

Deacon Blue singles chronology
"Hang Your Head" (1993)	"I Was Right and You Were Wrong" (1994)	"Dignity" (1994)

Music video
- "I Was Right and You Were Wrong" on YouTube

"I Was Right and You Were Wrong" is the first single from Scottish band Deacon Blue's first greatest hits album, Our Town - The Greatest Hits (1994). Produced by Steve Osborne, the song reached number 32 on the UK Singles Chart.

== Release ==
The single's first B-side is "Mexico Rain", produced by Osborne and Paul Oakenfold. The other new B-side is a live cover of Dusty Springfield's "Goin' Back". Though labeled simply as "Wages Day", the fourth track on the CD single is an acoustic piano version of the song.

As with the previous two single releases, a special edition CD single with three tracks from the Riches bonus album was issued, entitled "Riches Collection". In addition to "I Was Right and You Were Wrong", it contains three tracks from Riches. This was the last "Riches Collection" release, leaving two tracks from Riches, the cover of "Angeliou" and the Bob Clearmountain remix of "Dignity", excluded from this collection.

== Music video ==
The accompanying music video for "I Was Right and You Were Wrong" was directed by London-based director Zanna and produced by Paul McNally for M-Ocean. It was released on 28 March 1994 and features a shot in Bethnal Green and a narrative based around a sexy French woman.

== Track listings ==
All songs were written by Ricky Ross, except where noted.

- 7-inch and cassette single (660222 7; 660222 4)
1. "I Was Right and You Were Wrong" – 4:54
2. "Mexico Rain" – 4:04
- CD single (660222 2)
1. "I Was Right and You Were Wrong" – 4:54
2. "Mexico Rain" – 4:04
3. "Goin' Back" (live from the Dublin Feile, Ireland, 1993) (Goffin, King) – 3:24
4. "Wages Day [Piano Version]" – 3:18
- Special Edition CD single: Riches Collection (660222 5)
1. "I Was Right and You Were Wrong" (extended version) – 5:33
2. "Kings of the Western World" – 2:40
3. "Suffering" – 2:44
4. "Raintown" (piano version) – 3:40

== Charts ==
Chart (1994)	Peak position
Europe (Eurochart Hot 100)	73
Scotland (OCC)	10
UK Singles (OCC)	32
UK Airplay (Music Week)	39

== Release history ==
Region	Date	Format(s)	Label(s)	Ref.
United Kingdom	21 March 1994	7-inch vinyl; CD1; cassette	Columbia	
United Kingdom	28 March 1994	CD2	Columbia	
Japan	21 May 1994	CD	Epic	
Australia	23 May 1994	CD; cassette	Columbia	
