= Whatever You Say, Say Nothing =

Studio album by Deacon Blue
- Released: 1 March 1993
- Studios: AIR Studios (London); The Manor Studio (Oxfordshire); Outside Studios (Oxfordshire)
- Genres: Alternative rock; dance-rock; baggy; pop
- Length: 43:17
- Label: Columbia
- Producers: Steve Osborne; Paul Oakenfold

Deacon Blue chronology
| Fellow Hoodlums (1991) | Whatever You Say, Say Nothing (1993) | Our Town - The Greatest Hits (1994) |

Singles from Whatever You Say, Say Nothing
- 1. "Your Town" Released: 16 November 1992; 2. "Will We Be Lovers" Released: 1 February 1993; 3. "Only Tender Love" Released: 13 April 1993; 4. "Hang Your Head" Released: 5 July 1993

Alternative Cover
- Cover of US release

Whatever You Say, Say Nothing is the fourth studio album by Scottish rock band Deacon Blue, released in March 1993 by Columbia Records. It was the group's final original album before their initial dissolution in mid-1994.

Wishing to pursue a new musical direction, Deacon Blue recorded the album with the dance production team of Steve Osborne and Paul Oakenfold, hoping that the team's different background would provide a creative challenge. Oakenfold agreed to the project in hopes of changing the band's sound to something edgier, but recording sessions were fraught with disagreement and Oakenfold, who believed the group were uninterested in his ideas, lost interest in the project. Breaking with the band's earlier, more soulful and folky work, Whatever You Say is a visceral, guitar-driven alternative rock record with dance textures and driving rhythms. Lead singer Ricky Ross pens lyrics with more universal themes than on earlier records.

Promoted by the lead single and UK Top 20 hit "Your Town", Whatever You Say, Say Nothing reached number four in the UK Albums Chart, but was less successful than the band's earlier albums, and failed to chart in the United States. The album received an unenthusiastic response from music critics and the group's new direction baffled some of their fans. Some critics have described the album as a late entry into the dance-rock and baggy movements of the early 1990s. In support of the album, Deacon Blue toured Europe in 1993, with an elaborate stage set featuring scaffolding and corrugated sheets. The record was re-released in 2012 by Edsel Records as a two CD and DVD set.

== Background ==
Deacon Blue's third album, Fellow Hoodlums (1991), sold half as many copies as its predecessor, When the World Knows Your Name (1989), and was critically panned, though it did receive a Platinum certification in the United Kingdom. Believing that they had firmly "established their sound" by the release of Fellow Hoodlums, lead singer Ricky Ross comments that the band wished to pursue a drastic change in direction for the follow-up album, Whatever You Say, Say Nothing. Craig Winn of M8 believed the band's "need to attract a new audience" was comparable to Wet Wet Wet, who – having been criticised for attracting a teenage audience – released the "mature" album High on the Happy Side (1992) and became fashionable, but writes that Deacon Blue "had the opposite problem" of having a mature audience and wanting younger fans.

On impetus for the band's new stylistic change, Ross commented that after the band achieved their original aim of recording an album and appearing on Top of the Pops, he realised that he is "actually quite ambitious and [wanted] to take it somewhere [he] hadn't imagined possible". He also credited "boredom factor" as a reason, commenting that, as a songwriter, he originally joined the band because it would be "interesting", adding: "I'm pushing it having done three albums and trying to do four. So you may as well push your luck the whole way and make a fourth album that is actually quite adventurous." Ross said that, rather than commercial motivations driving the band's desire for new fans, he was more interested in "us being a band and staying a band and having fun being in a band", as "it's about really sparking and really pushing yourself hard because you just get lazy."

Deacon Blue chose dance producers Steve Osborne and Paul Oakenfold to produce the album. Bassist Ewen Vernal said that the production duo were recommended by A&R staff, and that the group chose them because their musical background was highly different to "anything we've ever done", believing that it had "got to the point where any new project we want to get into we try and approach with some kind of challenge in mind." According to Ross, the duo of Osborne and Oakenfold were one of several "oddball names", another being David Byrne, that the band piled with A&R workers, hoping to find "someone to visit the studio every two weeks and be a kind of upsetting factor in the whole thing". He said the decision to hire Oakenfold came down to his vague knowledge of him as a DJ, but was only familiar with his work on an INXS song. Ross has denied that the production team's work with U2 influenced the band's decision.

Oakenfold and Osborne had recently completed their work on the Happy Mondays' Pills 'n' Thrills and Bellyaches (1990) when Sony approached them to produce the Deacon Blue album. As Oakenfold later explained, he considered them to be "an out-and-out pop band, real cheese in some respects", and was uninterested in taking on the project, but was persuaded by the group's A&R man, who ensured him that the band "really want to change, to come up with a more interesting sound." As Deacon Blue were a Platinum-selling pop band, the producer decided it could be "a great thing to do, because it's not the obvious thing to do. We could completely change their sound. People would be able to see our production qualities, because we'd taken a pop band made them more edgy."

== Recording ==
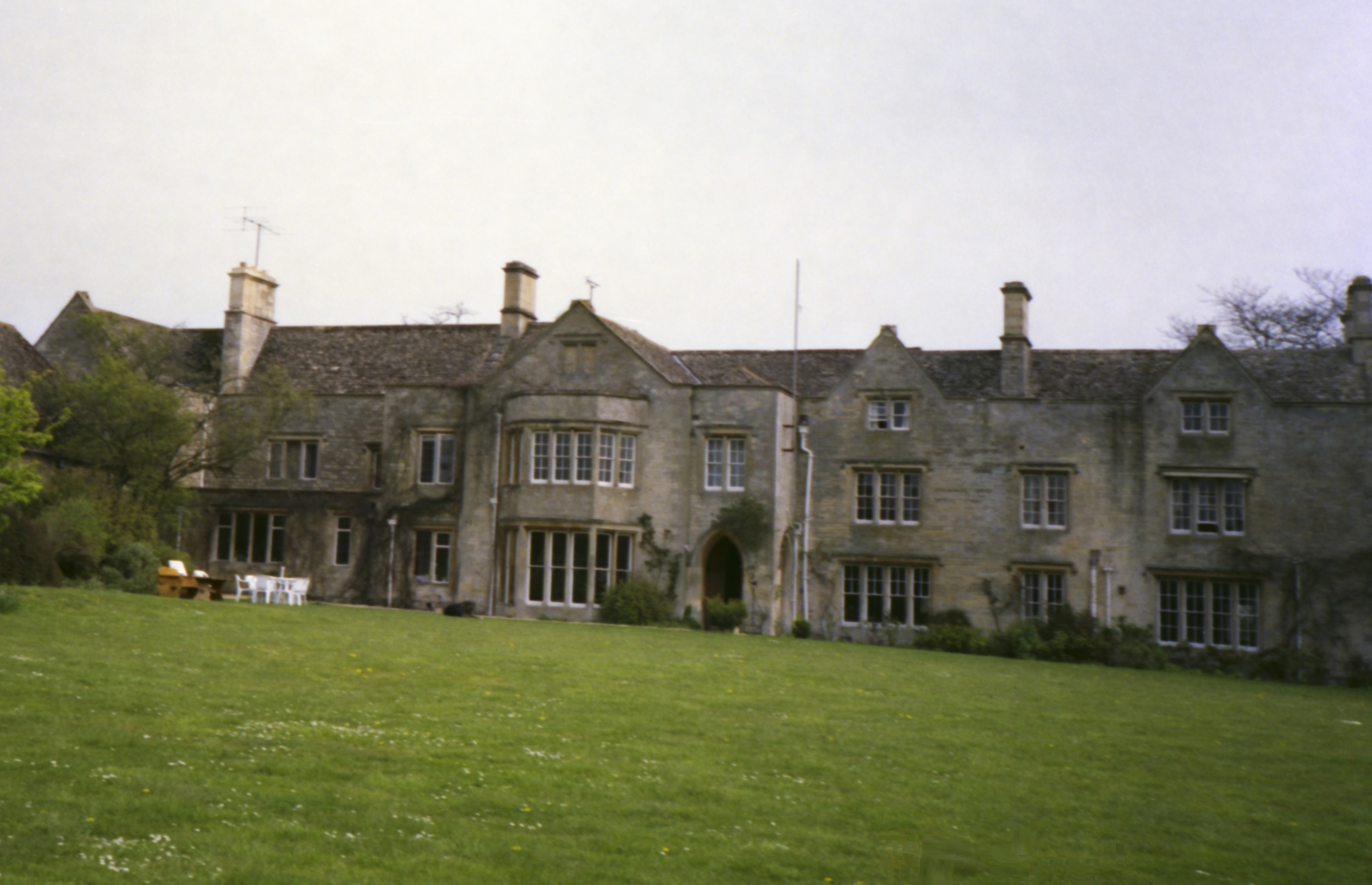
The Manor Studio, one of the recording locations, in 1990

Deacon Blue recorded Whatever You Say, Say Nothing in three English studios: London's AIR Studios, and Oxfordshire's The Manor Studio and Outside Studios. A fourth studio, Eden Studios in London, was used to mix the record. Paul Corkett recorded the album with assistance from Adrian Bushby, Danton Supple, Gorby and Steve Orchard. Vernal said the record was difficult to record, due to the band entering "territory which we'd never been in before'."

Music author Richard Norris writes that although recording with Oakenfold and Osborne was intended to "invigorate the band's creativity with a fresh new approach", the sessions were not wholly successful in this regard. Oakenfold said that Deacon Blue initially agreed to his ideas about moving their sound in an edgier direction, but that once he and Osborne entered the studio, the band changed their mind, having just released their best-selling single. The producer said that after completing the first track, which was "great", he told them "we now need to go more edgy...they're all getting nervous, and I'm saying trust me, this is where we're going now."

Oakenfold credits co-vocalist Lorraine McIntosh – Ross' partner – for driving the band's resistance to his ideas: "it was one of those cliches where she had his ear, and what she wanted was what went on." According to Ross and McIntosh in an interview with The Observer, Oakenfold and Osborne "took their carte blanche control of song selection to extreme tyrannical proportions", on occasion driving McIntosh to tears. The band's guitarist Graeme Kelling believed that, despite hiring the producers to break up the band's familiar way of working, "we were trying to force ourselves in to another jacket – a terrible-looking spangly one – and didn't realise that what we had was actually quite special."

Oakenfold lost interest by the end of the sessions as the album "was becoming more and more pop. Obviously it had all our sounds in terms of production, so the mix was a lot harder than the band were used to, but it was nowhere near where I wanted it to be." He said: "In the end you just think, fuck it, they ain't listening." He later said that despite losing interest, Osborne remained engaged. Ross viewed Osborne, rather than Oakenfold, as the album's central influence, saying: "I think Steve's input was 75% and Paul's 25%. Steve’s a huge part of the deal. Paul's very good at coming in and going 'Yeah, I know' to things, and they work together as a team. I think the logic of why they worked together as a team defied some of the band at the time because of how little Paul's input was on anything."

== Composition ==
=== Musical style and themes ===
For Whatever You Say, Say Nothing, Ricky Ross stirred Deacon Blue's sound into a more rock-oriented direction than their previous folk-tinged work, with the "unlikely" team-up with Osborne and Oakenfold contributing to the "major sonic departure" and giving it a dance edge. Considered an alternative rock record, the music is guitar-driven, something which pleased Kelling, who believed it marked a departure from the keyboard-oriented material on their earlier albums; he stated that Ross "wrote that album on guitar, and the songs were a lot more direct." The sound is broader and more visceral, and is further characterised by its driving rhythms, dense textures, and percussive dance flavour, achieved with the producers. The rhythms have been described as techno-esque and repetitive, while the use of "acoustic guitar, strings and a variety of percussion" leads to what reviewer Virginia Trioli describes as the album's distinctive British rock sound. Music critic Barbara Jaegar believes the group "boosted its rhythm quotient" for a more immediate feel, departing from the ethereal, soulful pop sound of its predecessors.

The reviewer John Harris contends that the album – through Oakenfold and Osborne's input – features a similar sound to Happy Mondays' Pills 'n' Thrills and Bellyaches. According to critic William Ruhlmann, Ross adopts a "high, breathy singing voice with lots of echo", and writes lyrics with more universal themes in contrast to earlier songs inspired by the Glasgow neighbourhood he grew up in. Kelling's guitar work is raw and melodic, inspiring comparison to James Honeyman-Scott of the Pretenders. Elements of the group's earlier sound remain, such as the midtempo pacing and the continued interplay between the two vocalists, Ross and McIntosh. Ross denied that they "set out to make a dance record" but added that a club mix of "Your Town" was produced because, as the song ran at 125 bpm, Osborne had the idea to "dance-up a Deacon Blue record" and surprise the band's fans. Nicole Meighan of The Scotsman wrote of the "fierce undercurrent of frustration and ragged anger" that characterises parts of the album, considering it "an impression, perhaps, of a band at sea, fighting against the tide."

=== Songs ===
The group's new direction is immediately apparent with the tense opening song, "Your Town", a galloping protest song with heavy guitars, keyboards, dance-like rhythms and breathy harmonies. Ross's unusually-altered vocals are distorted and muffled, inspiring comparison with industrial music, and Bono's vocals on U2's "The Fly" (1991). One reviewer commented that Ross' vocals are "compressed and equalized into an AM-radio buzz." His vocals are surrounded by the swirling guitars and the restrained, martial drums, while acoustic textures more typical of the band are placed low in the mix. Meighan describes the song as an "emotional juggernaut" through which drummer Dougie Vipond evokes Fleetwood Mac's "Big Love" (1987). The lyrics express anger at former Prime Minister Margaret Thatcher, who had been out of office since 1990, with lines like "When you're gone, they will curse you". Ross credits the venomous lyrics to the song being written in the leadup to the 1992 general election, saying: "We had had three Tory governments, and everyone was really sick, fed up with them, and it was that sort of political song." McIntosh has since described the song as one of her favourites by the group, praising its "unbelievable energy and power."

The sombre nature of "Your Town" continues with "Only Tender Love". "Peace & Jobs & Freedom" is a political song that features the highest prominence of McIntosh's vocals. Harris compares it to the "filthy-sounding" Happy Mondays song "Bob's Your Uncle" (1990). The driving, guitar-driven "Hang Your Head" features dance beats and "stainless steel guitar strings", while "Bethlehem's Gate" is one of several songs characterised by what Ruhlmann describes as "relentless, martial drumming and rhythmic instruments that played pulse patterns rather than complete chords". "Last Night I Dreamed of Henry Thomas" was singled out by reviewer Andy Gill as an anomaly on the album for its "odd, miasmic arrangement and sounds lurking and looming out of the work". "Will We Be Lovers" is driven by a "semi-dance beat", and was compared by Harris to the Happy Mondays' "Judge Fudge" (1991), while "Fall So Freely Down" features some atypical guitar work atop its heavy beats. "Cut Lip" is a funky, Prince-esque song with a Motown-style piano lick, an example of the soul-styled beats that appear throughout the record. The final song, "All Over the World" is midtempo and anthemic.

== Release and promotion ==
As the lead single from Whatever You Say, Say Nothing, "Your Town" was released in November 1992 and debuted at number 14 on the UK Singles Chart, becoming the highest new entry that week. The song stayed on the chart four eight weeks. In their review of "Our Town", i-D wrote that "Oakenfold did with U2 and does it again here..." Reviewing the United States single release in May 1993, The Hard Report compared the song to the Beloved and praised it as a "great tune" which "has adult appeal written all over it", adding that it could attract both "the flannel wearing college kids and your corporate commercial radio guys". Further singles charted in the UK: "Will We Be Lovers" reached number 31 in February 1993, "Only Tender Love" reached number 22 in April, and the Hang Your Head EP reached number 21 in July. The latter contained the title track, "Freedom Train", "Here on the Wind" and "Indigo Sky".

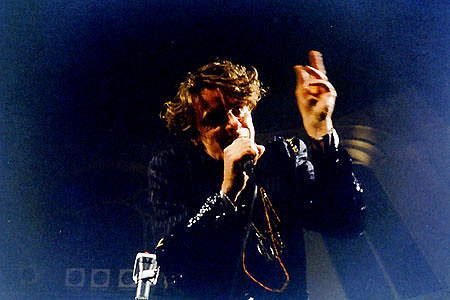
Ricky Ross on stage in 1993

Deacon Blue's fourth album, Whatever You Say, Say Nothing was released in the United Kingdom on 1 March 1993 through Columbia Records. Similarly to U2's Achtung Baby, the album is titled with an "ironic slogan", and coinciding with its release, Ross began wearing sunglasses and "rock star togs", in a manner that Harris compared with Bono. It reached number four on the UK Albums Chart, but was relatively unsuccessful compared to earlier records by the band. It only spent three weeks in the Top 20 and fell off the chart completely seven weeks later. It has been certified Gold by the British Phonographic Industry for 100,000 sales. The record also reached number 43 in the Netherlands, and number 91 in Germany. In the United States, the album was released on 23 June 1993, featuring alternate artwork. It was a major flop in the country and failed to chart.

Deacon Blue followed the album with a 1993 European tour. For the shows, Ross dressed in silvery lurex and wraparound sunglasses, drawing comparison to Bono, and used a megaphone and inspection lamp, similar to Tom Waits. The stage set was "cheapjack", featuring scaffolding and several silver-painted corrugated sheets. The set design was compared by some to U2's eccentric Zoo TV Tour, but according to Ross, the actual inspiration was Tom Waits' Big Time tour. Liverpool Echo's Penny Kiley, reviewing the two April shows in Liverpool's Royal Court Theatre, noted that while the album had been criticised for its "stadium rock direction", the group eschewed large-size venues for theatre gigs, evidencing the band's "commitment to reaching local audiences that fits their grass-roots style of song". This, she contends, was in contrast to the ambitious and highly visual nature of the shows, which heavily used lanterns, spotlights, torches and candles. The group cancelled their planned autumn 1993 tour, instead postponing it for spring 1994. Ross recalled that by the start of 1994, it had become clear that the tour "would be our last outing together", ahead of their split later in the year.

== Critical reception ==
Professional ratings
Review scores
| Source | Rating |
|---|---|
| AllMusic | 3/5 stars |
| Calgary Herald | C+ |
| Chicago Tribune | 3/4 stars |
| Cross Rhythms | 5/10 |
| The Daily Herald | B |
| Encyclopedia of Popular Music | 3/5 stars |
| The News-Pilot | 3/5 stars |
| NME | 3/10 |
| The Sunday Record | 3.5/4 stars |
| Sunday Republican | 3/5 stars |

Whatever You Say, Say Nothing received unenthusiastic reviews from music critics, and the group's new direction baffled many of their fans. In his NME review, John Harris criticised the album for exuding "the wish to play the reinvention game à la U2, and suddenly become fashionable", believing that the band's A&R staff told them to "get trendy" in face of their failure to reach stadium-selling status. He added that "among all the cod-baggy wooliness", the band had "lost the knack of writing silly-but-hummable pop songs". Cross Rhythms critic Rupert Loydell noted how the band joined many other bands in "the reinvention game", adopting "the U2-esque semi-collage method of dance music, grandiose songs and sonic interruption/layering." He considered the approach to work effectively on songs like "Your Town" but believed the songs are otherwise "lost", feeling that Ross was "trying too hard to be hip" and not allowing his lyrics and melodies to "speak for themselves", resulting in a generally unmemorable album.

Andy Gill of The Independent described the album as "a belated jump onto a baggy bandwagon" that fell out of fashion with the Happy Mondays' Yes Please! (1992), but noted that while Oakenfold and Osborne were hired to "jolly up" Deacon Blue's sound, they "seem baffled by Deacon Blue's mundanity, and seem to settle for an approximation of concert acoustics on many songs." In his review, The Daily Herald's Rick Anderson described Whatever You Say, Say Nothing as "just plain better than average" and praised "Your Town", but believed the album failed to keep its momentum, with the following songs "shadows of the opening track". Sunday Republican critic Kevin O'Hara wrote that Deacon Blue "comes out hitting hard", with some songs profiling Ross' best ever singing. While he considered the album's second half weaker, overall he lauded the band's broadening style.

The Sunday Record's Barbara Jaegar believed the band's new direction had not spoilt their "tasteful pop sound, which underscores thoughtful, sometimes cinematic lyrics", while Music & Media opined that Deacon Blue changed their 'fragile' sound without "affecting the quality of the songwriting", further praising the record for covering political subjects that "really matter, especially with such good music under it." Lou Carlozo of the Chicago Tribune believed that, due to Oakenfold and Osborne's production, Deacon Blue's sound was comparable to rowdy bands like Jesus Jones, the Charlatans and the Happy Mondays, and considered Whatever You Say to "[ooze] attitude". A reviewer for the Calgary Herald compared the album to a mixture of INXS and the Pet Shop Boys merged with "a dreamy, hazy production that make the lead vocals sound like they were recorded through asbestos", but deemed this the fashionable way to create "good white-boy disco – oops, dance music."

Virginia Trioli of The Age opined, "Whatever You Say is a really terrific album – solid, thematically tight with a rich and seeping sound reminiscent of Prefab Sprout at their best." In his review for The News-Pilot, Anthony D. Tranfa considered the record to be a continuation of Deacon Blue's "intriguing style" and noted that while they indulge in big choruses and the "sweeping, spiky guitar sound" popular at the time, they succeed at advancing their sound with creative "soul-tinged beats" and "unabashed joyful melodicism". The South Florida Sun-Sentinel reviewer John Lannert opined that Deacon Blue should achieve US success with their "smart, rhythmic rock album replete with eloquent, slate-gray narratives about genuine love and societal injustice". In a retrospective review for AllMusic, William Ruhlmann characterised the band eschewing their earlier folky sound for a rockier direction: "It was as if, having failed at becoming the next Van Morrison, Ross decided to become the next Bono."

== Legacy ==
Working on Whatever You Say, Say Nothing discouraged Oakenfold from producing further albums for other artists, later commenting: "It's months out of your life. Three months in a studio with the band every day, six days a week does my head in." He credits the project as the start of him and Osborne beginning to work apart, "because I ain't gonna spend six months of my life working on a record if I'm not into it. But it was Steve's only source of income, so he would go and do it." Colin Larkin credits the album's poor reception, as well as Deacon Blue's lack of commercial success in the US, as contributing factors in the band's decision to split in mid-1994. McIntosh recalled that "there was a feeling that we weren't entirely sure where we were going. Musically, Whatever You Say, Say Nothing was brave and passionate in lots of ways. But it was quite a difficult record for us." The album was re-released on 29 October 2012 in a set of two CDs and a bonus DVD. Issued by Edsel Records, the set's contents remixes and B-sides issued on the album's singles, alongside a casebound book and liner notes from Ross.

In an article on Deacon Blue's career, David Belcher of The Herald reflected that by "risibly" employing Oakenfold as producer, the album "openly signalled a clueless leap aboard a dance-rock bandwagon that had sho' nuff done gone left town two years previous. The Happy Mondays and Primal Scream? They went that-a-way." In a guide to Deacon Blue's work, David Burke of Classic Pop believes that as part of the shift in musical direction, Ross "traded his inner Boss for his inner Bono, especially on the histrionic 'Bethlehem’s Gate' and 'All Over the World'. And while the songs sometimes become submerged in the mix, you have to admire Ross' chutzpah". Burke also listed "Your Town" among the group's 'essential' singles. Writing in The Rough Guide to Rock (1999), Justin Lewis said that, despite the promising single "Your Town", Whatever You Say, Say Nothing is "potentially intriguing but, in the event, unspectacular". He commented that the producers' background as "dance gurus" was "hardly in evidence", and that aside from the single "Will We Be Lovers", there was "little sign of the band's old inspiration." In The Great Rock Discography (2000), Martin C. Strong opined that the album "smacked of desperation." However, Dougie Adam of Cross Rhythms considers it to be the group's "bravest and most underrated album".

== Track listing ==
All songs written by Ricky Ross, except where noted:

1. "Your Town" – 5:21
2. "Only Tender Love" – 5:10
3. "Peace & Jobs & Freedom" – 4:52
4. "Hang Your Head" – 4:05
5. "Bethlehem's Gate" – 4:47
6. "Last Night I Dreamed of Henry Thomas" – 3:45
7. "Will We Be Lovers" (Ross, Osborne) – 3:56
8. "Fall So Freely Down" – 4:17
9. "Cut Lip" – 3:36
10. "All Over the World" – 3:28

=== Vinyl edition ===
Side one

1. "Your Town" – 5:21
2. "Only Tender Love" – 5:10
3. "Peace & Jobs & Freedom" – 4:52
4. "Hang Your Head" – 4:05
5. "Bethlehem's Gate" – 4:47

Side two

1. "Will We Be Lovers" (Ross, Osborne) – 3:56
2. "Fall So Freely Down" – 4:17
3. "Cut Lip" – 3:36
4. "Last Night I Dreamed of Henry Thomas" – 3:45
5. "All Over the World" – 3:28

== Personnel ==
Adapted from the liner notes of Whatever You Say, Say Nothing

Deacon Blue

- Ricky Ross – vocals, guitar, piano, keyboard
- Lorraine McIntosh – vocal
- James Prime – keyboard, strings
- Ewen Vernal – bass
- Graeme Kelling – guitar
- Dougie Vipond – drums

Others

- Steve Osborne – production
- Paul Oakenfold – production
- Paul Corkett – recording
- Steve Orchard – recording assistance
- Adrian Bushby – recording assistance
- Gorby – recording assistance
- Danton Supple – recording assistance
- Gavin Wright – strings
- Ann Wood – violin ("Your Town")
- Pascal Benadjaoud – bongos ("Fall So Freely Down")
- Michael Nash Associates – design

== Weekly charts ==
| Album (1993) | Peak position |
|---|---|
| Australian Albums (ARIA) | 161 |
| Dutch Albums (Album Top 100) | 43 |
| German Albums (Offizielle Top 100) | 91 |
| UK Albums (Official Charts) | 4 |

| "Will We Be Lovers" (1993) | Peak position |
|---|---|
| Europe (Eurochart Hot 100) | 77 |
| UK Singles (OCC) | 31 |
| UK Airplay (Music Week) | 5 |

| "Your Town" (1992–1993) | Peak position |
|---|---|
| Australia (ARIA) | 158 |
| Ireland (IRMA) | 28 |
| Netherlands (Dutch Top 40) | 17 |
| Netherlands (Single Top 100) | 20 |
| UK Singles (Official Charts) | 14 |
| US Dance Club Play (Billboard) | 6 |
| US Maxi-Singles Sales (Billboard) | 39 |
| US Modern Rock Tracks (Billboard) | 27 |

| "Only Tender Love" (1993) | Peak position |
|---|---|
| Europe (Eurochart Hot 100) | 62 |
| UK Singles (OCC) | 22 |
| UK Airplay (Music Week) | 14 |

== Certifications ==
| Region | Certification | Certified units/sales |
|---|---|---|
| United Kingdom (BPI) | Gold | 100,000^{^} |
^{^} Shipments figures based on certification alone.
