= A New House =

Studio album by Deacon Blue
- Released: 8 September 2014
- Recorded: 2012–2014
- Genres: Alternative rock, pop
- Length: 42:00
- Label: Medium Wave
- Producer: Paul Savage

Deacon Blue chronology
The Hipsters (2012)	A New House (2014)	Believers (2016)

A New House is the seventh studio album by Scottish rock band Deacon Blue, released on 8 September 2014. The album consists of 11 tracks.

== Track listing ==
=== Standard edition ===
No.	Title	Writer(s)	Length
1.	"Bethlehem Begins"	Ricky Ross	4:06
2.	"For John Muir"	Ricky Ross, Gregor Philp	3:07
3.	"A New House"	Ricky Ross	3:32
4.	"An Ocean"	Ricky Ross, Gregor Philp	3:19
5.	"The Living"	Ricky Ross, Gregor Philp	3:53
6.	"I Wish I Was A Girl Like You"	Ricky Ross, Dan Sells, Richard Jones	3:34
7.	"Win"	Ricky Ross, Eg White	3:18
8.	"Wild"	Ricky Ross, Steve Booker	3:04
9.	"March"	Ricky Ross, James Prime, Gregor Philp	3:20
10.	"Our New Land"	Ricky Ross	3:57
11.	"I Remember Every Single Kiss"	Ricky Ross, Gregor Philp	4:15

== Personnel ==
- Ricky Ross — vocals
- Lorraine McIntosh — vocals
- James Prime — keyboards, backing vocals
- Douglas Vipond — drums

== Additional personnel ==
- Gregor Philp — guitar
- Lewis Gordon — bass
