= Bigger Than Dynamite =

"Bigger than Dynamite"

Single by Deacon Blue

from the album Singles
- B-side: "Deportee Song"; "Wild Horses"
- Released: 16 October 2006
- Genre: Pop rock
- Length: 3:25
- Label: Columbia
- Songwriter(s): Ricky Ross
- Producer(s): Ricky Ross and Scott Fraser

Deacon Blue singles chronology
"A is for Astronaut" (2001)	"Bigger than Dynamite" (2006)	"The Hipsters" (2012)

"Bigger than Dynamite" is the only single released from Deacon Blue's compilation album Singles.

The B-sides are covers of Woody Guthrie's "Deportee Song" and the Rolling Stones' "Wild Horses", performed live.

== Track listing ==
CD single (88697000822)

1. "Bigger than Dynamite" – 3:25
2. "Deportee Song (Live From Newport Centre, Newport, England, 24.11.01)" (Guthrie, Martin Hoffman) – 6:25
3. "Wild Horses (Live From Newport Centre, Newport, England, 24.11.01)" (Richards, Jagger) – 5:30
