= Four Bacharach & David Songs =

1990 EP by Deacon Blue

EP by Deacon Blue
- Released: 13 August 1990
- Length: 13:42
- Label: CBS
- Producer: Jon Kelly

Deacon Blue chronology
"Queen of the New Year" (1989)	Four Bacharach & David Songs (1990)	"Your Swaying Arms" (1991)

Four Bacharach & David Songs is an extended play (EP) of four songs written by the songwriting team of Burt Bacharach and Hal David, performed by Scottish rock band Deacon Blue. It was released on 7-inch vinyl, 12-inch vinyl, CD and cassette on 13 August 1990.

The first track, "I'll Never Fall in Love Again", was the main radio choice for the EP, and received extensive radio play in the United Kingdom and peaked at No. 2 on the UK Singles Chart, becoming Deacon Blue's best-charting single in the UK. The EP was later combined with tracks from Deacon Blue's compilation Riches and released as Riches & More in 1997.

== Track listing ==
All songs were written by Burt Bacharach and Hal David.

1. "I'll Never Fall in Love Again"
2. "The Look of Love"
3. "Are You There (with Another Girl)"
4. "Message to Michael"

== Charts ==
=== Weekly charts ===
Chart (1990)	Peak position
Europe (Eurochart Hot 100)	4
Ireland (IRMA) "I'll Never Fall in Love Again"	2
Netherlands (Single Top 100) "I'll Never Fall in Love Again"	72
UK Singles (OCC)	2

=== Year-end charts ===
Chart (1990)	Position
UK Singles (OCC)	44

== Release history ==
Region	Date	Format(s)	Label(s)	Ref.
United Kingdom	13 August 1990	7-inch vinyl; 12-inch vinyl; CD; cassette	CBS	
Australia	1 October 1990	CD; cassette	CBS	
