= The Hipsters =

Studio album by Deacon Blue
- Released: 24 September 2012
- Recorded: July 2011 – May 2012
- Genre: Alternative rock, pop
- Length: 32:40
- Label: Demon, Edsel
- Producer: Paul Savage

Deacon Blue chronology
Singles (2006)	The Hipsters (2012)	A New House (2014)

Professional ratings
Review scores
Source	Rating
Mojo	link
Q	link

The Hipsters is the sixth studio album released by Scottish pop group Deacon Blue. The album was released by Demon Music on 24 September 2012, making it their first studio album in eleven years. The album's lead single, "The Hipsters" was released on 23 September 2012.

== Background and release ==
Deacon Blue last released a studio album in 2001, which was Homesick. In 2006, they released a compilation album, Singles.

Prior to the release of The Hipsters album, the group released a single of the same name, "The Hipsters". The single was released in the United Kingdom on 23 September 2012.

== Reviews ==
The album received generally positive reviews. The BBC commented on The Hipsters: "The lead single and title track provides the promise of optimistic, sunlit, indie-flecked arrangements, which does follow through for the most part. The rhythmic thump of 'Rest' and 'That’s What We Can Do' prove to be perfect examples". "The Hipsters proves that Deacon Blue are showing their age, in the most positive way – their tightly-defined chemistry, accomplished storytelling and knack for melodies have been finely honed over the past 25 years. And while the title lends itself to all manner of trend-conscious pretension, there are no such gimmicks present".

The BBC said that Deacon Blue "isn’t a band attempting to recapture their halcyon days – Deacon Blue are doing what they’ve always been able to do with aplomb, atop some well-considered, refined and timely production. There’s no huge statement to be made, no desperate clawing for another shot – merely a legitimate love for what they do. And on The Hipsters, that’s made very evident indeed".

== Track listing ==
The Hipsters track listing
No.	Title	Writer(s)	Length
1.	"Here I Am in London Town"	Ricky Ross	2:59
2.	"The Hipsters"	Ross	3:19
3.	"Stars"	Ross, Gregor Philp	3:42
4.	"Turn"	Ross, Eg White	3:19
5.	"The Rest"	Ross, Lorraine McIntosh	3:37
6.	"The Outsiders"	Ross, Gregor Philp	4:05
7.	"That's What We Can Do"	Ross	3:53
8.	"She'll Understand"	Ross	3:38
9.	"Laura from Memory"	Ross	3:25
10.	"It Will End in Tears"	Ross	3:39
11.	"Is There No Way Back to You"	Ross, Lorraine McIntosh	4:22

== Chart performance ==
For the week starting 26 September 2012; The Hipsters charted at No. 19 on the UK Albums Chart mid-week chart listings.
