= Believers (Deacon Blue album) =

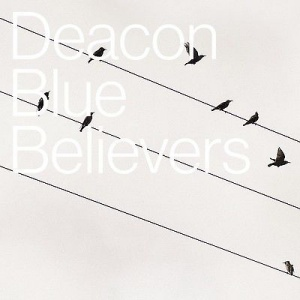

Studio album by Deacon Blue
- Released: 30 September 2016
- Recorded: 2014–2016
- Genre: Pop, rock
- Length: 44:00
- Label: EarMusic, Sheer Sound
- Producer: Paul Savage

Deacon Blue chronology
A New House (2014)	Believers (2016)	City of Love (2020)

Believers is the eighth studio album released by Scottish band Deacon Blue, released on 30 September 2016 via both EarMusic and Sheer Sound recording labels. The album was a commercial success in the United Kingdom, debuting at number thirteen and remained in the UK Albums Chart for a further week, making Believers Deacon Blue's seventh Top 40 UK album. In their native Scotland, Believers debuted at number four on the Scottish Albums Chart.

== Background ==
The album serves as the band's follow up to their 2014 effort, A New House which performed well in international album charts and spawned a number of single releases. Whilst previous efforts had been successful for Deacon Blue and the band enjoying a surge again in popularity in Europe, Believers became Deacon Blue's highest charting album in twenty three years in the United Kingdom.

== Track listing ==
=== Standard edition ===
No.	Title	Writer(s)	Length
1.	"The Believers"	Ricky Ross	3:36
2.	"This Is A Love Song"	Ricky Ross, Gregor Philp	4:03
3.	"I Will And I Won't"	Ricky Ross	3:47
4.	"Meteors"	Ricky Ross, Gregor Philp	3:03
5.	"Gone"	Ricky Ross	3:36
6.	"What I Left Out"	Ricky Ross	3:18
7.	"A Boy"	Ricky Ross, Gregor Philp	3:13
8.	"Birds"	Ricky Ross	5:56
9.	"You Can't Know Everything"	Ricky Ross	3:38
10.	"Delivery Man"	Ricky Ross, James Prime	4:25
11.	"Come Awake"	Ricky Ross	3:52
12.	"B Boy"	Ricky Ross	1:44

== Chart performance ==
Chart (2017)	Peak position
Scottish Albums (OCC)	4
UK Albums (OCC)	13
UK Album Downloads (OCC)	17
UK Independent Albums (OCC)	6

== See also ==
- Deacon Blue discography
