= Lorraine McIntosh =

Scottish singer

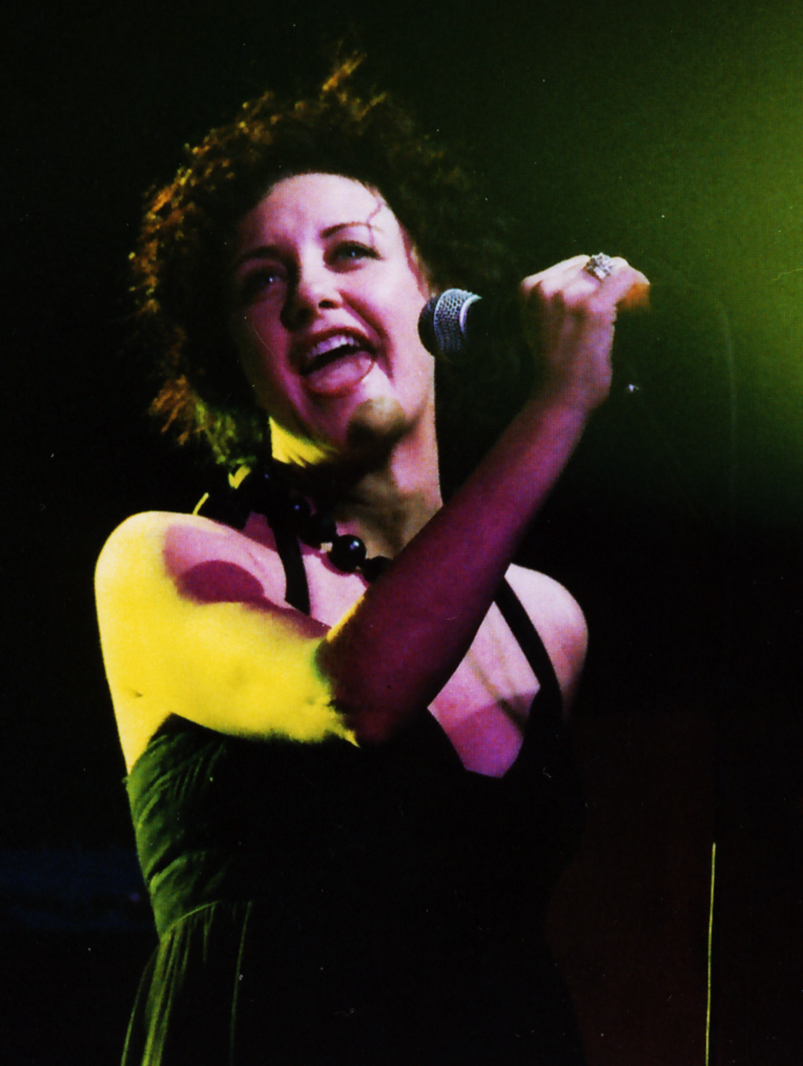
- McIntosh performing with Deacon Blue in London, 2006
- Born: 13 May 1964 (age 62); Glasgow, Scotland
- Education: University of Abertay (Honorary Doctor of Arts)
- Occupations: Singer; musician; songwriter; actress
- Years active: 1980–present
- Works: Discography
- Spouse: Ricky Ross (m. 1990)
- Awards: See list
- Musical career
- Origin: Cumnock, Ayrshire, Scotland
- Genres: Pop; rock; blues; alternative rock; pop rock; sophisti-pop
- Instruments: Vocals; percussion
- Member of: Deacon Blue

Lorraine McIntosh is a Scottish singer and actress. Alongside her husband Ricky Ross, she is one of the vocalists of the pop rock band Deacon Blue.

== Career ==
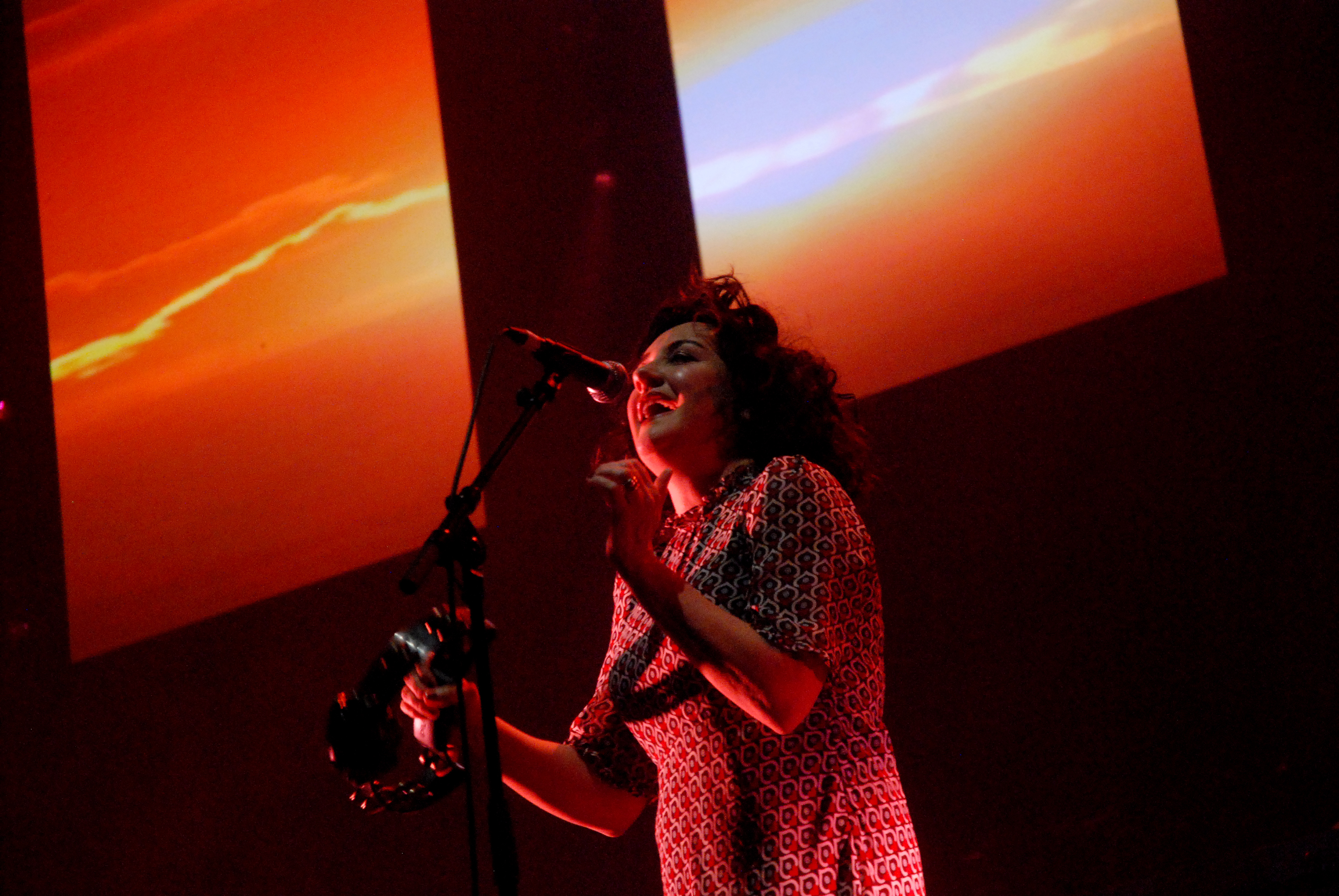
McIntosh at the OVO Hydro, 2018

McIntosh is a vocalist with Deacon Blue, whose second studio album, When the World Knows Your Name (1989), topped the UK Albums Chart for two weeks, and included "Real Gone Kid", which became their first UK top ten single.

McIntosh took a break from music to play the character Alice Henderson in the Scottish soap opera River City, which was set in a fictitious suburb of Glasgow. Her character first appeared in 2002 and was written out during May 2010. Further television appearances include the police drama Taggart and BBC One comedy-drama Hope Springs. McIntosh has also appeared in Scottish cinema, including Ken Loach's My Name Is Joe, and Lone Scherfig's Wilbur Wants to Kill Himself.

In November 2024, Abertay University honoured McIntosh with an honorary Doctor of Arts degree.

== Personal life ==
McIntosh was born on 13 May 1964 in Glasgow, Scotland and was raised in the Ayrshire town of Cumnock. She married Deacon Blue lead singer Ricky Ross on 12 May 1990; they have four children.

She is of maternal Irish Catholic descent: her mother, Sarah McIntosh (née Gallagher), was from the townland of Dore in Gweedore, a district in the north-west of County Donegal in Ulster.

== Discography ==
- Raintown (1987)
- When the World Knows Your Name (1989)
- Fellow Hoodlums (1991)
- Whatever You Say, Say Nothing (1993)
- Walking Back Home (1999)
- Homesick (2001)
- The Hipsters (2012)
- A New House (2014)
- Believers (2016)
- City of Love (2020)
- Riding on the Tide of Love (2021)
- The Great Western Road (2025)

== Filmography ==
Film
Year	Title	Role	Notes
1998	My Name Is Joe	Maggie	
2000	Aberdeen	Nurse	
2002	Wilbur Wants to Kill Himself	Ruby	
2004	Wise Guys	Pauline	Short film
2014	Gasping	AA Attendee	Short film
2016	West Skerra Light	Joan	Television film
2018	Long Night at Blackstone	Faye Bowers	Television film

Television
Year	Title	Role	Notes
1991	Screen Two	Deacon Blue - Girl in Graveyard	Series 7, Episode 10: "Dreaming"
1999	Psychos	Carrie Burns	Mini-series, Episode 5
1999	Life Support	Bethan Gilchrist	Episode 3: "The Price of Love" and Episode 5: "Soul and Conscience"
1999; 2003; 2008	Taggart	Cocktail Waitress; Brenda Johnstone; Sharon Nash	Series 15, Episode 4: "Long Time Dead"; Series 19, Episode 6: "Halfway House"; Series 24, Episode 7: "Safer"
2002	Fran's People	Janis Dunlop	Series 1, Episode 2
2002–2023	River City	Alice Henderson	4 episodes
2009	Hope Springs	Ina Harries	7 episodes
2009	Happy Hollidays	Rosalind	Episode 5: "Donkey"
2017	Scot Squad	Barbara Edwards	Series 4, Episode 2
2020	Outlander	Mrs. Sylvie	Series 5, Episode 10: "Mercy Shall Follow Me"
2021	Princess Mirror-Belle	Ruth	Episode 3: "Big Bad Wolf"
2023	Shetland	Heather Bain	Series 8, 2 episodes
