= Deacon Blue =

Scottish band

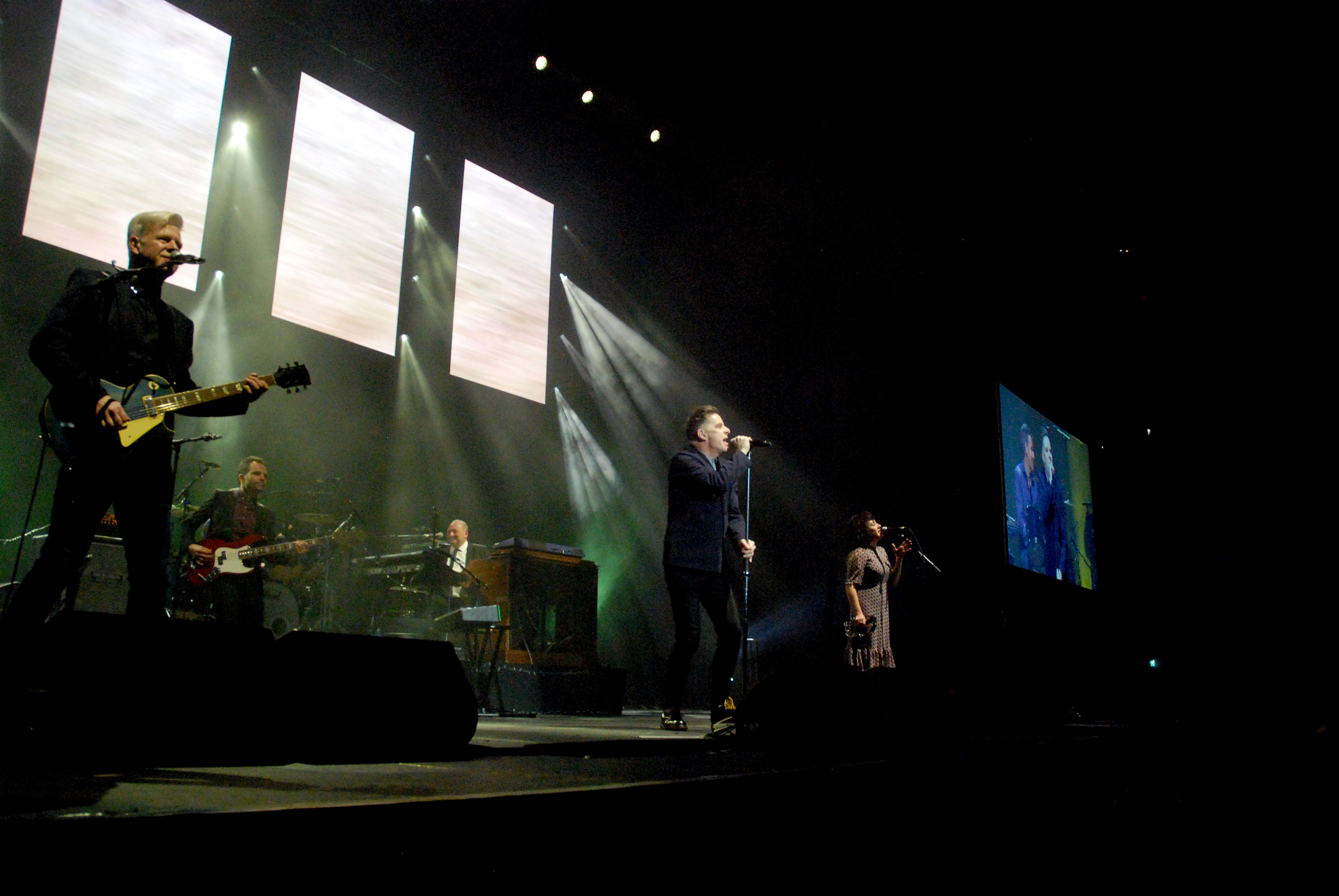
- Deacon Blue performing live at the SSE Hydro, 2018

Background information
- Origin: Glasgow, Scotland
- Genres: Pop; rock; blues; alternative rock; pop rock; sophisti-pop
- Years active: 1985–1994, 1999–present
- Labels: CBS; Sony; Chrysalis; Demon Music Group (REs); Earmusic; Sheer Sound; Cooking Vinyl; Concert Live; Papillon
- Members: Ricky Ross; Lorraine McIntosh; Dougie Vipond; Gregor Philp; Lewis Gordon; Brian McAlpine
- Past members: James Prime; Graeme Kelling; Ewen Vernal
- Website: deaconblue.com

Deacon Blue are a Scottish pop rock band formed in Glasgow in 1985, currently consisting of vocalists Ricky Ross and Lorraine McIntosh, drummer Dougie Vipond, guitarist Gregor Philp and bassist Lewis Gordon. In 2013, their estimated album sales stood at six million, and by 2020 were estimated to have risen to in excess of seven million, with twelve UK top 40 singles, along with two number one albums in both the United Kingdom and Scotland.

The band released their debut album, Raintown (1987) to critical and commercial success, with their second album, When the World Knows Your Name (1989), topping the UK Albums Chart for two weeks. The single "Real Gone Kid" became their first top ten single in the UK Singles Chart and reached number one in Spain. Deacon Blue followed up the success of their first two albums with Fellow Hoodlums (1991) and Whatever You Say, Say Nothing (1993). When Deacon Blue disbanded in 1994 until five years later, holding a reunion gig which led on to a new album, Walking Back Home (1999). The band released another album, Homesick (2001), the last to feature guitarist Graeme Kelling; he died from pancreatic cancer in 2004. In 2006, the band recorded three new songs for a Singles album – including the single "Bigger than Dynamite".

Deacon Blue returned after a period of absence to release The Hipsters (2012), their first studio album since Homesick in 2001. The band released a further four albums following their reunion – A New House, (2014), Believers (2016), City of Love (2020) and Riding on the Tide of Love (2021) to commercial success. In 2024, they released "Late '88" as the lead single from their eleventh studio album The Great Western Road (2025).

== Career ==
=== 1985–1987: Formation and early years ===
Taking their name from the 1977 Steely Dan song "Deacon Blues", Deacon Blue were formed in 1985 following Ricky Ross's move from Dundee to Glasgow. Along with Ross, the group originally consisted of Lorraine McIntosh, James Prime, Dougie Vipond, Ewen Vernal and Graeme Kelling.

Ross, a former school teacher originally from Dundee, was the group's frontman, penning the majority of Deacon Blue's songs. He married vocalist Lorraine McIntosh in 1990. In 1986, the band contributed a track ("Take the Saints Away") to a compilation cassette entitled "Honey at the Core", featuring then up-and-coming Glasgow bands, including Wet Wet Wet, The Bluebells, Kevin McDermott, The Big Dish, and Hue and Cry.

=== 1987–1991: Raintown and When the World Knows Your Name ===
The band's debut album, Raintown, produced by Jon Kelly was released in 1987. It spawned the singles "Dignity", "Chocolate Girl" and "Loaded". The city that the album's title refers to is Glasgow and the cover art of the album is a photograph (by the Scottish-Italian photographer Oscar Marzaroli) of the River Clyde's docks taken from Kelvingrove Park. It proved a commercial success and has to date sold around a million copies, peaking in the UK Albums Chart at No. 14 and remaining in that chart for a year and a half. On 27 February 2006, Raintown was reissued as part of Columbia's Legacy Edition series. The reissue was expanded to two CDs, the first of which featured the original 11 track album. The second CD featured alternate cuts of all 11 album tracks, as well as the two original CD bonus tracks "Riches" and "Kings of the Western World". The new edition did not include the varied bonus cuts (remixes and b-sides) that were found on the singles from the album.

The second album, 1989's When the World Knows Your Name, was the band's most commercially successful, reaching No. 1 in the UK Albums Chart and generating five UK top 30 hits, including "Real Gone Kid", "Wages Day", and "Fergus Sings the Blues" (all five singles from the album were top 10 hits in Ireland). The following year saw the band play in front of an estimated 250,000 fans at the free concert on Glasgow Green, "The Big Day", which was held to celebrate Glasgow being named that year's European City of Culture. The band also played Glastonbury and the Roskilde festivals that summer, as well as released Ooh Las Vegas, a double album of B-sides, extra tracks, film tracks, and sessions which reached No. 3 in the UK Albums Chart.

=== 1991–1994: Continued success and split ===
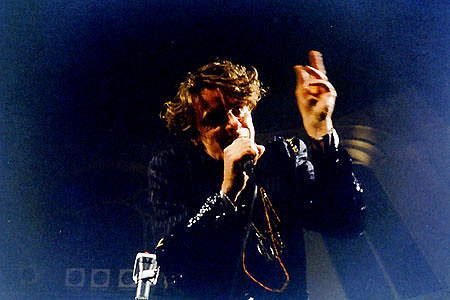
Lead singer Ricky Ross performing live in Amsterdam in 1993

Jon Kelly returned to the producer's chair in 1991 for the album Fellow Hoodlums. The album was met with more critical approval and peaked at No. 2 on the UK Albums Chart. Fellow Hoodlums was followed up by 1993's Whatever You Say, Say Nothing, a much more experimental album. The album was not as commercially successful as the previous two albums, peaking at No. 4 on the UK Albums Chart. Changing from producer Jon Kelly to the team of Steve Osborne and Paul Oakenfold, this album presented a change in musical style for Deacon Blue. While the band's songwriting remained based in rock and blues, many of the tracks moved into alternative rock territory in their presentation.

The band embarked on another sold out UK tour in 1994, after recording new material for their greatest hits compilation album, Our Town. This saw the band return to No. 1 in the UK Albums Chart and was one of the year's top sellers, while "I Was Right and You Were Wrong" and a re-release of "Dignity" saw the band re-enter the Top 20 of the UK Singles Chart. The album contained the previous singles from the band, minus "Closing Time" and "Hang Your Head". The album also contained three new tracks. "I Was Right and You Were Wrong", the first single from this album, was an alternative rock track that continued and expanded the musical direction the band had taken with Whatever You Say, Say Nothing. "Bound to Love" and "Still in the Mood" were pop songs in the tradition of Deacon Blue's earlier albums. The vinyl LP version of the album contained a fourth new track, "Beautiful Stranger". "Dignity" was released, now for the third time, as the second single from the album.

With Vipond's decision to quit the group in favour of a career in television, Deacon Blue split up in 1994.

=== 1999–2012: Re–union and Walking Back Home ===
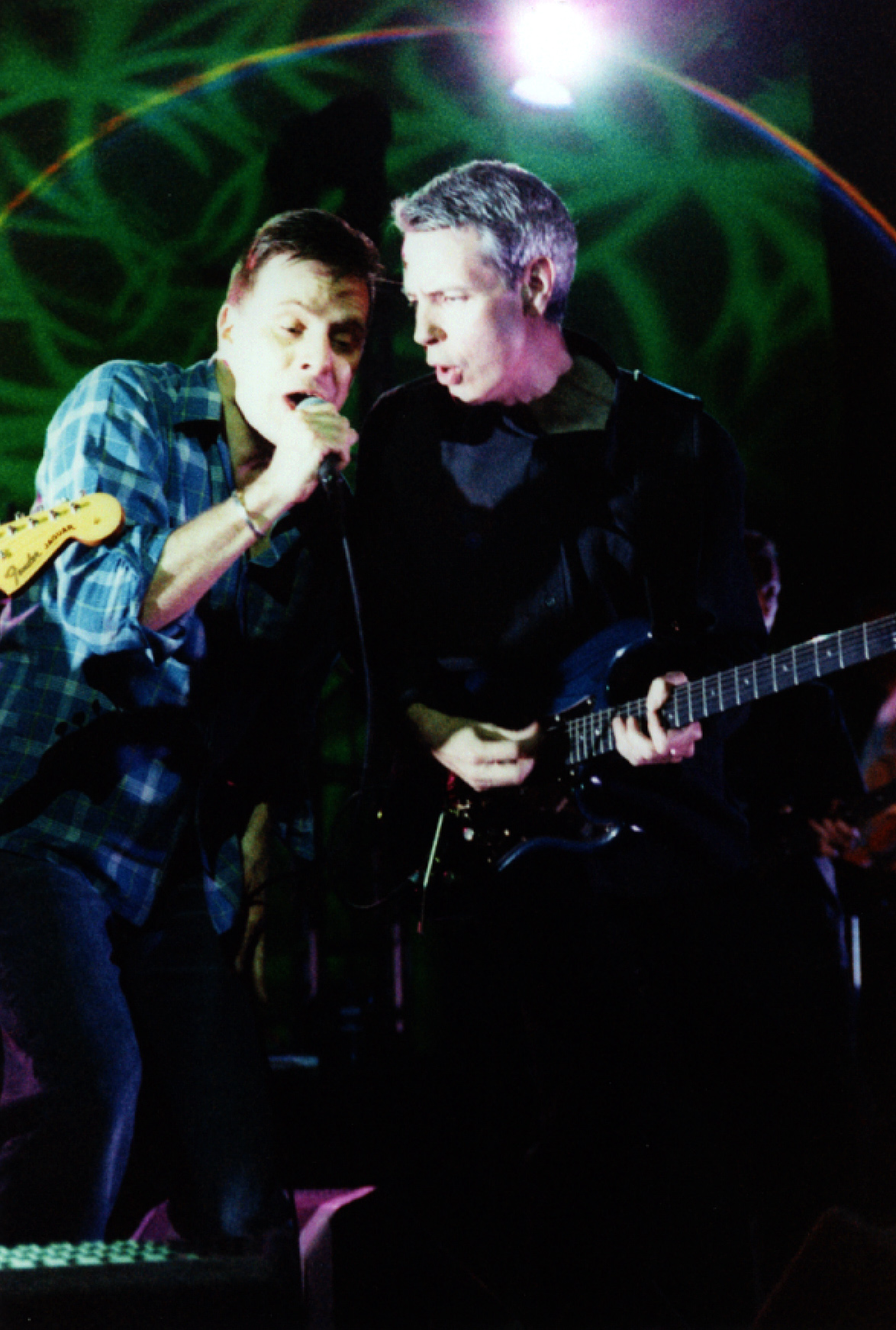
Ross (left) and Kelling performing at the SECC, 2001

Five years later, the band held a reunion gig in 1999, and this led on to a new album, Walking Back Home, with the band now working on a part-time basis. The Walking Back Home album combined eight songs that were brand new compositions, previously unreleased tracks, or released only with limited availability, with nine previously released Deacon Blue songs. This was followed by another album, Homesick, in 2001. Graeme Kelling died from pancreatic cancer in 2004, but the band continued and recorded three new tracks for a Singles album – including the track "Bigger than Dynamite" in 2006.

The band performed at Manchester United's Old Trafford stadium, as the pre-match entertainment for the Rugby league Super League Grand Final on 14 October 2006, and continued on to a full UK tour in November. They were also due to open Stirling's New Year party in 2006, but this was cancelled at the last minute due to extreme weather. A further tour followed in November 2007 and the band then provided support for Simple Minds in 2008. They also appeared at Stirling's Hogmanay in 2008.

Deacon Blue appeared at The Homecoming Live Final Fling Show, at Glasgow's SECC on 28 November 2009, and headlined Glasgow's Hogmanay on 31 December 2009. The band performed several gigs, including Glastonbury, and the Liverpool Echo Arena on 29 July 2011. Ross, who had released a solo album before the formation of Deacon Blue, released two solo albums during the time between Deacon Blue's breakup in 1994 and reformation in 1999. Due to Deacon Blue's part-time status after reformation, Ross released additional solo albums in 2002 and 2005 and has written for and with other recording artists. In 2009, Ross and McIntosh recorded an album together under the name 'McIntosh Ross'.

=== 2012–2018: New record label and subsequent releases ===
In 2012, it was announced Deacon Blue had new management, Paul Loasby and Tom O'Rourke, and had signed a recording contract and would release a new album that year.

To promote the upcoming release of their new album, the group released a single, "The Hipsters". The single was released in the United Kingdom on 23 September 2012. The album The Hipsters was released on 24 September 2012 and was produced by Paul Savage. A 25th anniversary tour, starting in October 2012, followed. The band performed with the BBC Scottish Symphony Orchestra at the Grand Hall in Glasgow to promote the release of the album. All of the band's studio albums were reissued as deluxe editions by Edsel Records in October 2012, as well as a new compilation entitled The Rest. Deacon Blue arranged dates in 2014 for a comeback tour. It was announced in April 2014 that their seventh studio album, A New House, would be released on 8 September that year. Deacon Blue also performed at the Glasgow 2014 Commonwealth Games closing ceremony on 3 August 2014, performing their hit, "Dignity".

A new studio album, Believers, was released on 30 September 2016. Three promo singles, the title track, "This Is A Love Song" and "Gone" have been released. A tour was undertaken to promote the album, culminating in a return to the Glasgow Barrowlands on 4 December 2016, which was recorded for a live album as well as video. This was released on 31 March 2017 on vinyl, CD, DVD, Blu-Ray as well as digital download of both audio and video versions. A special screening event was held, the day before, at the Glasgow Film Theatre.

Between February and March 2018, Deacon Blue embarked on a tour of Spain, marking the first time that the band has played a series of live shows in Spain. The band described the shows as "an incredible experience for us all", and later confirmed that Deacon Blue will be returning to Spain in 2019 for another series of live shows, stating that "Spain has a very special place in our hearts".

=== 2018–2025: City of Love and Riding on the Tide of Love ===
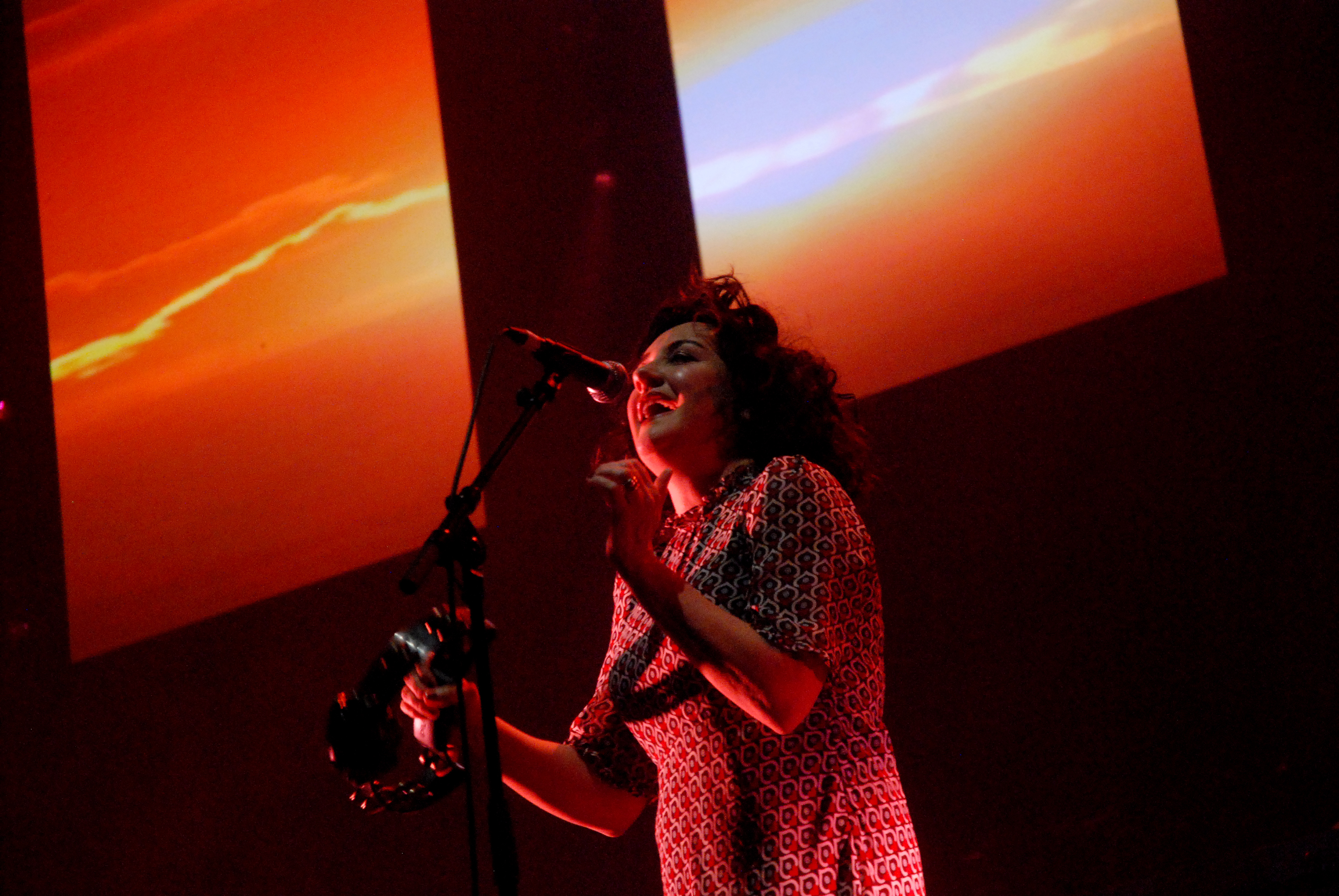
Backing vocalist and percussionist, Lorraine McIntosh, at the SSE Hydro, 2018

The band released their ninth studio album entitled City of Love on 6 March 2020, to critical acclaim. The album received positive reviews and achieved commercial success. The album charted at number one in their native Scotland, number four in the United Kingdom and peaked at number fifty in Spain.

During the COVID-19 pandemic, the band recorded and released their tenth studio album entitled Riding on the Tide of Love which was released in February 2021. The album failed to reach the same level of commercial success in the United Kingdom that the band experienced with their previous album, City of Love, with the album debuting at number 23 on the UK Albums Chart. In their native Scotland, the album performed better, debuting at number two and spending additional weeks within the Scottish Top 40 albums charts.

To promote the release of the album, the band announced the Riding on the Tide of Love tour which is scheduled to begin in June 2021 in Brighton and concludes on 19 December 2021 at the SSE Hydro in Glasgow. In September 2023, they released the compilation album All The Old 45s – The Very Best of Deacon Blue via Cooking Vinyl. It debuted at number two on the official Scottish Albums Chart on 8 September, behind Back To The Water Below by Royal Blood. It went to spend eight weeks within the Top 100 of the Scottish Albums Chart. In the United Kingdom, it was a moderate success, debuting at number 42 on the UK Albums Chart, spending one week within the Top 100. The band embarked on a tour of the United Kingdom and the Republic of Ireland, beginning in September 2023, to promote the release of All the Old 45s.

=== 2025–present: The Great Western Road and arena tour ===
The band's eleventh studio album, The Great Western Road, is scheduled to be released on 21 March 2025. During the same month, they are set to embark on an arena tour across the United Kingdom and Ireland which includes their first date at the Wembley Arena in London since 1990. The tour will conclude with two shows at the OVO Hydro in their native Glasgow. The album is said to be a reflection of the band's journey since they first began performing during the 1980s, with lead single "Late 88" being said to be a "fondly reminder of the care-free excitement of those early days" for the band. The album was recorded at Rockfield Studios.

In June 2025, it was announced that founding member James Prime had died following a "short struggle with cancer".

== Members ==
=== Current ===
- Ricky Ross – lead vocals, piano
- Lorraine McIntosh – backing and lead vocals, percussion
- Dougie Vipond – drums, percussion
- Gregor Philp – guitar
- Lewis Gordon – bass
- Brian McAlpine - keyboards, piano

=== Past ===
Original members

- James Prime – keyboards, piano (died June 2025)
- Graeme Kelling – guitar (died June 2004)
- Ewen Vernal – bass, keyboard bass

Other past members

- Mick Slaven – guitar
- Scott Fraser – bass
- Taj Wyzgowski – guitar
- Ged Grimes – bass
- Chris Henderson - drums

== Discography ==
- Raintown (1987)
- When the World Knows Your Name (1989)
- Ooh Las Vegas (1990)
- Fellow Hoodlums (1991)
- Whatever You Say, Say Nothing (1993)
- Walking Back Home (1999)
- Homesick (2001)
- The Hipsters (2012)
- A New House (2014)
- Believers (2016)
- City of Love (2020)
- Riding on the Tide of Love (2021)
- The Great Western Road (2025)

== Awards and nominations ==
Year	Category	Recipient/Work	Result	Winner
1989	British Single of the Year	"Real Gone Kid"	Nominated	"Perfect" by Fairground Attraction
2020	Scotland's Greatest Song (Ewen Cameron in the Morning public vote)	"Dignity"	Won	N/A – winners of the accolade were Deacon Blue

In 2020, Deacon Blue's 1987 single "Dignity" was voted as Scotland's greatest song after a public vote voted through the radio programme Ewen Cameron in the Morning.
