= Ewen Vernal =

Scottish musician

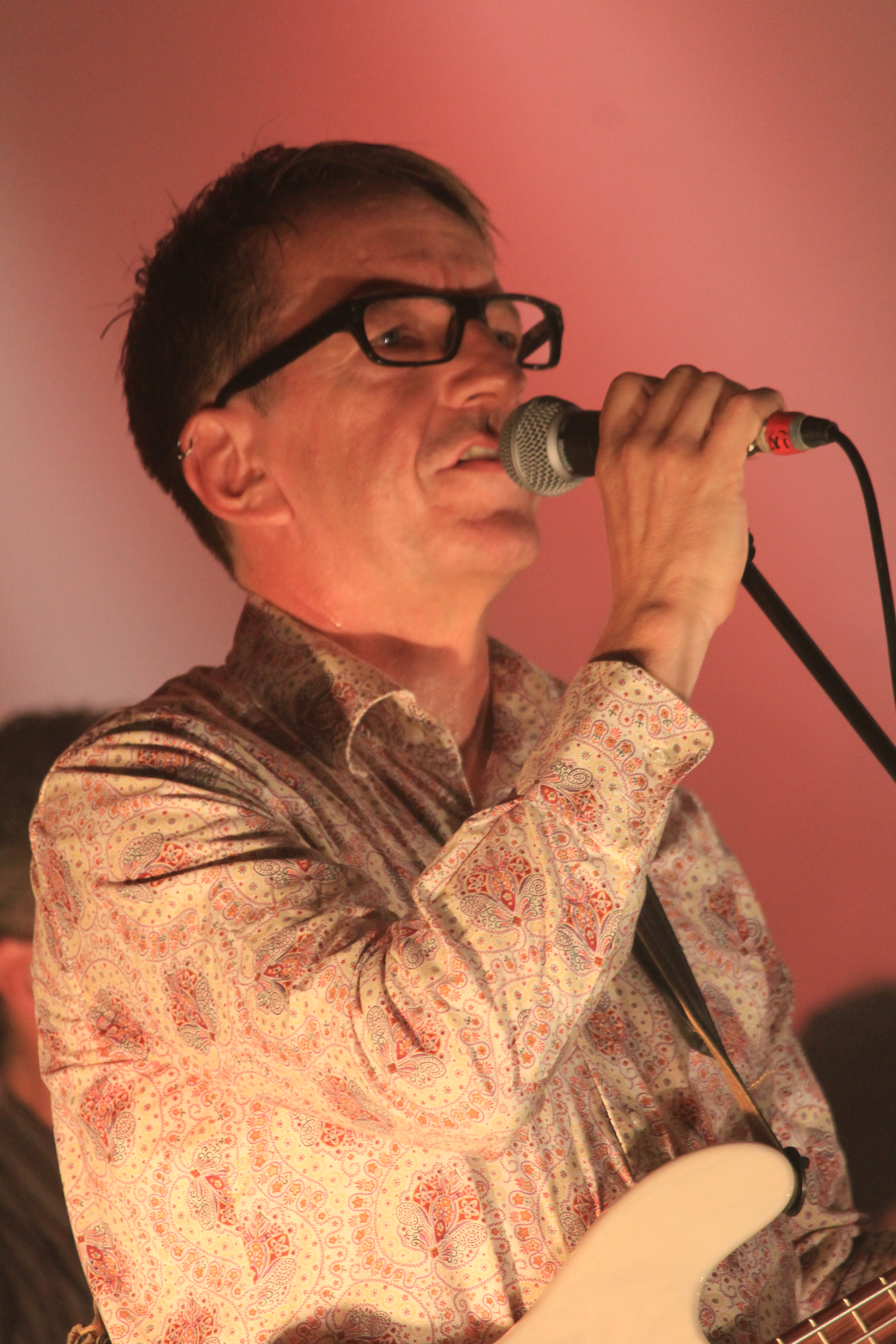
- Vernal in 2013

Background information
- Born: 27 February 1964 (age 62); Glasgow, Scotland
- Genres: Pop rock; Scottish folk
- Instrument: Bass guitar
- Years active: 1980-present
- Member of: Capercaillie
- Formerly of: Deacon Blue

Ewen Vernal (born 27 February 1964) is a Scottish musician. Formerly of Deacon Blue, he is currently the bass guitarist of Scottish folk band Capercaillie.

== Early life ==
Vernal was born in Glasgow on 27 February 1964. He grew up in a musical family and began piano lessons at 8 years old; inspired by his mother, a fan of the Beatles and the organist of Springburn Baptist Church, and his father, who was in a choir and played the saxophone. Vernal took part in singing competitions and local talent contests, but took up the bass guitar in his teenage years after discovering an old one in the family loft.

== Career ==
From the early 1980s, Vernal began playing in a variety of Glasgow-based bands and some jazz residencies throughout Scotland until, after some persuasion from their drummer, joined newly signed Deacon Blue in the autumn of 1986—until 1994, the band enjoyed worldwide success. In 1997, Vernal joined Capercaillie, of which he is still a member.

Vernal has, additionally, worked with other artists; including Fish, Kate Rusby, Hue and Cry, Lou Reed, Michael Brecker and Chris Rea.
