= Ricky Ross (musician) =

Scottish singer (born 1957)

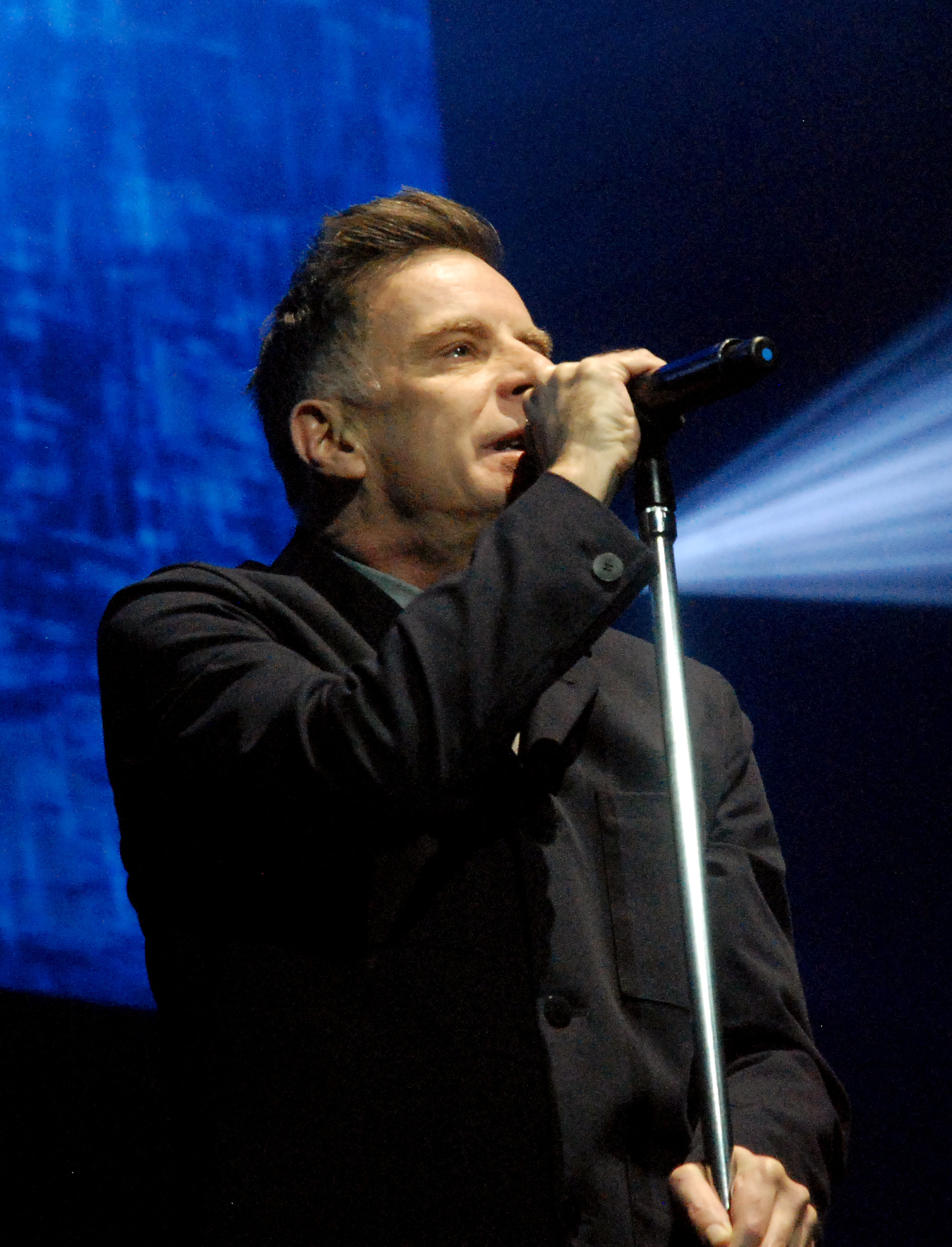
- Ross performing with Deacon Blue at the SSE Hydro, Glasgow, 2018

Background information
- Born: Richard Alexander Ross; 22 December 1957 (age 68); Dundee, Scotland
- Genres: Pop, alternative rock
- Occupations: Singer, musician, songwriter
- Instruments: Vocals, guitar, piano, keyboards
- Years active: 1983–present
- Member of: Deacon Blue
- Spouse: Lorraine McIntosh (m. 1990)
- Website: rickyross.com

Richard Alexander Ross (born 22 December 1957) is a Scottish musician. He is lead singer of pop-rock band Deacon Blue. Alongside his discography with Deacon Blue, Ross has released a number of solo albums: his first, So Long Ago, was released in 1984.

== Biography ==
=== Early life ===
Ross was born in Dundee, Scotland, in 1957 and attended the High School of Dundee, an independent school.

=== Deacon Blue (1987–present) ===
Ross is a founding member and lead singer of the rock band Deacon Blue. The band released their debut album, Raintown, on 1 May 1987 in the United Kingdom and in the United States in February 1988. Their second album, When the World Knows Your Name (1989), topped the UK Albums Chart for two weeks, and included "Real Gone Kid" which became their first top ten single in the UK Singles Chart.

Deacon Blue released their fourth album, Whatever You Say, Say Nothing, in 1993. The band split in 1994. Five years later, the band held a reunion gig, and this led on to a new album, Walking Back Home, with the band now working on a part-time basis. The band released another album, Homesick, in 2001. Though Graeme Kelling died from pancreatic cancer in 2004, the band has continued and 2006 saw Deacon Blue returning to the studio to record three new tracks for a Singles album – including the track "Bigger than Dynamite". Deacon Blue's next album was The Hipsters, in 2012. The band released another album, A New House, in September 2014. Believers, was released in September 2016. A concert recording of their return to the Barrowland, Glasgow, was released on 31 March 2017.

The band's tenth studio album City of Love was released on 6 March 2020. In February 2021, they released their eleventh studio album entitled Riding on the Tide of Love to commercial success in both the UK and their native Scotland.

As of 2012, Deacon Blue's total album sales stood at six million, with twelve UK top 40 singles, along with two UK number one albums.

=== Solo work (1984–present) ===
Before the formation of Deacon Blue, Ross released a solo album So Long Ago, on the Glasgow independent label Sticky Records. After the band's break-up in 1994, Ross resurrected his solo career and Epic released his second solo album What You Are in 1996. As Ross's first solo album So Long Ago was a minor release on a relatively minor label, What You Are became his first solo release on a major label and as such is generally regarded as his debut solo album for a major label.

Ross released another album, New Recording, on his own label in 1997. After Deacon Blue's reunion in 1999 and the release of their Walking Back Home and Homesick albums, Ross entered into a new publishing deal with Warner Chappell UK, and released another solo album, This Is the Life, through Chrysalis Records's short-lived Papillion label, in 2002. Papillion had released Deacon Blue's Homesick album the previous year.

As part of his publishing deal with Warner Chappell, Ross began co-writing with other artists. He currently spends more time writing than on his solo career or Deacon Blue projects. To date he has written for and with James Blunt, Ronan Keating, KT Tunstall, David Sneddon, Cathy Burton, Gareth Gates, Emma Bunton, Will Young and Jamie Cullum among others.

In 2005, Ross released the album Pale Rider through P3 Music. In September 2009 Ross and McIntosh released The Great Lakes, an album on the Cooking Vinyl label.

Ross released a collection of songs in 2013, the 12-track Trouble Came Looking, on the Edsel Recordings label. He also performed a wide-ranging UK acoustic tour in support of the album which saw him play small, intimate venues, alongside Gregor Philp.

Ross released the album Short Stories Vol. 1 with the label earMUSIC on 15 September 2017. The album incorporates new songs with a mix of Deacon Blue song's such as "Wages Day" and "Raintown".

=== Other work ===
Ross currently presents Another Country with Ricky Ross on BBC Radio Scotland and has covered for Mark Radcliffe, Bob Harris and Dermot O'Leary on BBC Radio 2. He also occasionally broadcasts for Radio 2 from the yearly Celtic Connections festival in Glasgow. For his broadcasting, Ross won the International Country Broadcaster of the Year Award from the Country Music Association in 2014.

He is also the recipient of an honorary doctorate from Abertay University.

== Personal life ==
Ross is married to Deacon Blue member Lorraine McIntosh and they have four children together. They married on 12 May 1990.

== Discography ==
=== Solo albums ===
- So Long Ago (1984)
- What You Are (1996)
- New Recording (1997)
- This Is the Life (2002)
- Pale Rider (2005)
- Trouble Came Looking (2013)
- Short Stories Vol. 1 (2017)
- Short Stories Vol. 2 (2022)

=== with Deacon Blue ===
- Raintown (1987)
- When the World Knows Your Name (1989)
- Ooh Las Vegas (1990)
- Fellow Hoodlums (1991)
- Whatever You Say, Say Nothing (1993)
- Walking Back Home (1999)
- Homesick (2001)
- The Hipsters (2012)
- A New House (2014)
- Believers (2016)
- City of Love (2020)
- Riding on the Tide of Love (2021)
- The Great Western Road (2025)

=== EPs ===
- The Undeveloped Heart EP (1998)

=== Singles ===
Year	Title	Album	UK Chart
1996	"Radio On"	What You Are	35
1997	"Good Evening Philadelphia"	What You Are	58
