= Dougie Vipond =

British musician (born 1966)

- Born: Douglas Vipond; 15 October 1966 (age 60)
- Origin: Inchinnan, Renfrewshire, Scotland
- Genres: Pop, alternative rock
- Occupations: Broadcaster, musician
- Instruments: Drums, vocals
- Years active: 1985–present
- Member of: Deacon Blue

Douglas Vipond (born 15 October 1966) is a Scottish broadcaster and musician, best known as the drummer of Scottish pop rock band Deacon Blue.

== Early life ==
Vipond was brought up in Inchinnan and attended Park Mains High School in Erskine, choosing to go there because of the reputation of the music department. After school, he enrolled at Glasgow's Royal Scottish Academy of Music to study orchestral percussion.

== Deacon Blue ==
Vipond was one of the founding members of pop band Deacon Blue alongside Ricky Ross and Lorraine McIntosh. Their 1988 hit "Real Gone Kid" peaked at number 8 in the UK singles chart. They have had 12 UK Top 40 singles and two number-1 albums. He remains an active recording and touring member of the group alongside his broadcasting career.

== Television career ==
On television and radio, Vipond has fronted sport, travel and rural affairs programmes. He has presented a range of sporting events including Scottish Cup Finals, International Rugby, Melrose 7s, World Championship Mountain Biking, Three-Day Eventing and Bowls World Championship. He can also be seen covering Scotland's nightly sports news on BBC Reporting Scotland.

He was one of the BBC's presenters for the Commonwealth Games in Glasgow, presenting daytime coverage of events for BBC Three, but was unable to present the closing ceremony as Deacon Blue were performing as part of it.

Vipond was also a guest presenter for the BBC Radio 4 programme Ramblings in 2013, walking a stretch of the Coast to Coast Walk.

He also presents BBC Scotland's The Adventure Show and the rural affairs series Landward. He has also been a presenter on BBC One's Holiday among others, and stood in for Richard Madeley on ITV's This Morning. He co-hosted the BBC show The Great Food Guys, showcasing Scottish food and produce with Nick Nairn.

== Awards ==
In 2022, Vipond was awarded an Honorary Fellowship by the Perth-based Royal Scottish Geographical Society.

In March 2024, Vipond was the recipient of an honorary degree from the University of Stirling.
