= Trip Advizer – The Very Best of Julian Cope 1999–2014 =

Compilation album by Julian Cope
- Released: January 2015
- Genre: Rock
- Length: 71:09
- Label: Lord Yatesbury
- Producer: Julian Cope

Julian Cope chronology
Revolutionary Suicide (2013)	Trip Advizer – The Very Best of Julian Cope 1999–2014 (2015)	Drunken Songs (2017)

Trip Advizer – The Very Best of Julian Cope 1999–2014 is a compilation album by Julian Cope, released in January 2015 on Cope's own Lord Yatesbury label.

Trip Advizer contains sixteen songs recorded between 1999-2014, mainly culled from Cope's solo albums of that period. The album also includes two previously unreleased tracks, "Julian in the Underworld" and a rerecording of "Psychedelic Revolution", where Cope takes the lead vocal rather than guest singer Lucy Brownhills on the original version.

== Background ==
Julian Cope said of the album, “Trip Advizer was released as my way of acknowledging that 15 years is, for some artists, a whole lifetime of work. So I felt obliged to address the whole slew of 21st Century song-based albums. Of course, I could have been extra needy and made the thing a 2CD package, but my real intention was to adopt the position of some super-editor and cut to the chase.”

== Critical reception ==
Professional ratings
Review scores
Source	Rating
Record Collector	4/5 stars
Louder	3.5/5 stars

Oregano Rathbone of Record Collector rated the album four stars out of five and said "Trip Advizer ... consistently delivers defining examples of Cope’s artistic validity" and "It’s ever apparent that this krautrock devotee never lost sight of his pop instincts." Rating the album 3 ½ stars out of five, Mark Beaumont of Louder called the album "dark, demented and manically mysterious," and commented: "Cope’s brave olde world is a riot to explore." Ben Graham of The Quietus said that the album "begins at roughly the point that he fell off most people's radar," but proves that "Cope's musical muse is still in rude health and that, in fact, the latter phase of his career has produced some of his most important and enjoyable work to date."

Leonard Nevarez of Sound It Out described the album as "a striking collection of anti-monotheist agit-pop and neolithic history lessons set to music," and said: "There’s a didactic tone to Trip Advizer, with lyrics railing against capitalist “greedheads” and the bloodshed, oppression, and cultural erasures legitimated by the “desert gods” of Christianity, Judaism and Islam. Cope’s strident, which-side-are-you-on sentiments deserve your attention but clearly aren’t for everyone. Ultimately what redeems them is his humor, his remarkable skill as a songwriter and bandleader."

== Track listing ==
All tracks are written by Julian Cope

No.	Title	Place of origin	Length
1.	"These Things I Know"	Black Sheep, 2008	5:04
2.	"Hell Is Wicked" (Edit)	Citizen Cain'd, 2005	4:21
3.	"Psychedelic Odin" (Edit)	Black Sheep	5:14
4.	"Raving on the Moor"	Psychedelic Revolution, 2012	5:42
5.	"I'm Living in the Room They Found Saddam In"	Citizen Cain'd	4:28
6.	"They Were on Hard Drugs" (Edit)	Revolutionary Suicide, 2013	4:52
7.	"A Child is Born in Cerrig-Y-Drudion"	You Gotta Problem with Me, 2007	3:14
8.	"Cromwell in Ireland"	Psychedelic Revolution	3:11
9.	"Woden"	You Gotta Problem with Me	4:48
10.	"Zoroaster"	Dark Orgasm, 2005	4:01
11.	"Julian in the Underworld"	Previously unreleased	4:12
12.	"Revolutionary Suicide"	Revolutionary Suicide	3:19
13.	"All the Blowing-Themselves-Up Motherfuckers"	Black Sheep	3:03
14.	"Conspiracist Blues"	Floored Genius 3, 2000	1:52
15.	"Psychedelic Revolution" (New version)	Previously unreleased	5:21
16.	"Shrine of the Black Youth"	Rome Wasn't Burned in a Day, 2003	8:17

== Personnel ==
Credits adapted from the album's liner notes.

- Julian Cope – vocals; guitar [all tracks]; Mellotron [1, 3, 4, 8, 11, 13]; bass [2, 3, 10-12], 30" marching bass drum [1, 7, 8, 13], piano and electric piano [2, 6, 7, 10-12, 15], Korg & Moog synthesizers [4, 6, 7, 15], producer, directed by, photography
- Donald Ross Skinner – drums
- David "Mitch Razor" Francolini – drums
- Phil Legende – help on "Psychedelic Revolution"
- Christopher Patrick "Holy" McGrail – mastering
- Avalon Cope – cover photography, design
- Christopher Holman – photography
- Andrew "Common Era" Johnstone – photography
- Adam Kardashian – photography
