= Rite Now =

Studio album by Julian Cope
- Released: 2002
- Genre: Ambient, funk, krautrock
- Length: 72:25
- Label: Head Heritage
- Producer: Julian Cope

Julian Cope chronology
Discover Odin (2001)	Rite Now (2002)	Rome Wasn't Burned in a Day (2003)

Professional ratings
Review scores
Source	Rating
Encyclopedia of Popular Music	2/5 stars
The Great Rock Discography	6/10

Rite Now is the eighteenth solo album by Julian Cope, released in 2002. It is also the third album in the Rite series following the earlier albums Rite (1992) and Rite² (1997).

Mostly instrumental, the album features four "meditational funk-a-thons", as Cope's website describes them, combining funky grooves and krautrock rhythms with wah-wah guitars and "cosmic" synthesizers.

== Track listing ==
All tracks are written by Julian Cope.

No.	Title	Length
1.	"Twilight of the Motherfuckers"	21:25
2.	"Give the Poet Some"	14:22
3.	"Supernatural Agencies"	16:29
4.	"Ephaedra"	20:09

== Personnel ==
Credits adapted from the album's liner notes.

Musicians

- Julian Cope – bass, guitar, Mellotron 400, percussion, vocals
- Anthony "Doggen" Foster – guitar (also performs pseudonymously as "Terry Dobbin" playing guitar and percussion)
- Thighpaulsandra – ARP 2600, Korg organ, Faerial 5 (also performs pseudonymously as "Cliff Cheerio" playing Hammond organ, percussion and Roland 77)
- Donald Ross Skinner – percussion, harmonica, organ, bass on "Ephaedra"
- Kevin "Kevlar" Bales – drums
- Adam Whittaker – digital, cassettes
- John-Paul Braddock – digital, crystal machine

Technical

- Julian Cope – producer, directed by, photography, design
- Flora Cocktail – design
