= The Skellington Chronicles =

Studio album by Julian Cope
- Released: June 1993
- Recorded: April 1989, London; April 21–22, 1993, London
- Genre: Rock, folk rock, neo-psychedelia
- Length: 61:36
- Label: Ma-Gog
- Producer: Julian Cope

Julian Cope chronology
Rite (1993)	The Skellington Chronicles (1993)	Autogeddon (1994)

Professional ratings
Review scores
Source	Rating
The Encyclopedia of Popular Music	3/5 stars
Select	4/5 stars

The Skellington Chronicles is the tenth solo album by Julian Cope, released in June 1993 on Cope's own Ma-Gog label. It contains the previously released 1989 album Skellington and its sequel Skellington 2, released here for the first time. Skellington 2 was, like its predecessor, recorded in just two days on April 21–22, 1993.

The Skellington Chronicles was re-released as Ye Skellington Chronicles in 1999 with one song removed from the track listing and two bonus tracks.

== Track listing ==
All tracks are written by Julian Cope, except where noted

Skellington 1
No.	Title	Writer(s)	Length
1.	"Doomed"		3:38
2.	"Beaver"		2:27
3.	"Me and Jimmy Jones"		1:27
4.	"Robert Mitchum"	Cope, Ian McCulloch	2:39
5.	"Out of My Mind on Dope and Speed"		3:26
6.	"Don't Crash Here"		0:56
7.	"Everything Playing at Once"		1:29
8.	"Little Donkey"		2:41
9.	"Great White Wonder"		2:10
10.	"Incredibly Ugly Girl"		3:01
11.	"No How, No Why, No Way, No Where, No When"		1:56
12.	"Commin' Soon"		2:16

Skellington 2
No.	Title	Writer(s)	Length
13.	"Electrical Stormgirl"		1:48
14.	"Poppins"		1:36
15.	"Skip"		1:29
16.	"I've Got My T.V. and My Pills"		1:37
17.	"The Angel and the Fellatress"		3:54
18.	"Waco-Pops"		1:35
19.	"Common Land at Water's Edge"		2:27
20.	"Scud-U-Like"		0:44
21.	"Grimreaper Is a Krautrocker"	Cope, Rooster Cosby, Donald Ross Skinner	8:29
22.	"American Tragedy"		1:17
23.	"Wayland's Smithy Has Wings"		1:31
24.	"Madonna Baglady Blues"		4:38
25.	"London Underground"		1:59
Total length:			61:36

=== Ye Skellington Chronicles (1999, Head Heritage) ===
Skellington 1
No.	Title	Writer(s)	Length
1.	"Doomed"		3:38
2.	"Beaver"		2:27
3.	"Me and Jimmy Jones"		1:27
4.	"Robert Mitchum"	Cope, McCulloch	2:39
5.	"Out of My Mind on Dope and Speed"		3:26
6.	"Don't Crash Here"		0:56
7.	"Everything Playing at Once"		1:29
8.	"Little Donkey"		2:41
9.	"Great White Wonder"		2:10
10.	"Incredibly Ugly Girl"		3:01
11.	"No How, No Why, No Way, No Where, No When"		1:56
12.	"Commin' Soon"		2:16

Skellington 2
No.	Title	Length
13.	"Electrical Stormgirl"	1:48
14.	"Poppins"	1:36
15.	"Skip"	1:29
16.	"I've Got My T.V. and My Pills"	1:37
17.	"The Angel and the Fellatress"	3:54
18.	"Waco-Pops"	1:35
19.	"Common Land at Water's Edge"	2:27
20.	"Scud-U-Like"	0:44
21.	"American Tragedy"	1:17
22.	"Wayland's Smithy Has Wings"	1:31
23.	"Madonna Baglady Blues"	4:38
24.	"London Underground"	1:59

Bonus tracks
No.	Title	Length
25.	"Skellington Anti-Polltax Live in Lambeth, England (Medley)"	5:01
26.	"Trampolene" (hidden track)	6:52
Total length:		65:00

Notes

- "Skellington Anti-Polltax Live in Lambeth, England (Medley)" was recorded at Brixton Fridge, May 1990.
- The track "Grimreaper Is a Krautrocker" from The Skellington Chronicles is not included on Ye Skellington Chronicles.

== Personnel ==
Credits adapted from the album's liner notes.

Skellington 1

- Julian Cope - vocals, acoustic guitar (also performed pseudonymously as "Double DeHarrison" playing piano and organ)
- Donald Ross Skinner - electric guitar, piano, organ
- Mark "Rooster" Cosby - drums, percussion, horns
- Hugo Nicolson - horns

Skellington 2

- Julian Cope - vocals, guitar, bass
- Donald Ross Skinner - keyboards, guitar, bass on "Poppins", drums on "Skip" and "The Angel and the Fellatress"
- Mark "Rooster" Cosby - drums, saxophone, guitar on "Poppins"
- Luke Tunney - trumpet
- Shaun Harvey - keyboards on "Grimreaper Is a Krautrocker"

Technical

- Julian Cope - producer, director, design
- Donald Ross Skinner - compiling, editing
- Mark "Rooster" Cosby - co-director
- Hugo Nicolson - engineer, mixing
- Shaun Harvey - engineer, mixing
- Rob Carter - design, artwork
- Lisa Bennett - design
- Donato Cinicolo - photography
- Cally Callomon - photography
