= Floored Genius 2 – Best of the BBC Sessions 1983–91 =

Compilation album by Julian Cope
- Released: 1993
- Recorded: 1983–1991
- Genre: Indie rock
- Label: Nighttracks
- Producer: Dale Griffin; Mark Radcliffe; John Porter; John Sparrow; Barry Andrews; Harry Parker

Julian Cope chronology
Rite (1993)	Floored Genius 2 – Best of the BBC Sessions 1983–91 (1993)	Autogeddon (1994)

Professional ratings
Review scores
Source	Rating
AllMusic	4.5/5 stars
Record Collector	4/5 stars

Floored Genius 2 - Best of the BBC Sessions 1983–91 is a compilation album of BBC studio recordings by Julian Cope, released in 1993 by Nighttracks.

In 2010, an expanded edition was released with a second CD of bonus tracks by Island/Mercury.

== Track listing ==
Adapted from the album's liner notes.

All tracks are written by Julian Cope; except where indicated.

No.	Title	BBC Session, Recording Date	Length
1.	"The Greatness and Perfection of Love"	John Peel, 5 February 1983	3:22
2.	"Head Hang Low"	John Peel, 5 February 1983	4:06
3.	"Hey High Class Butcher"	John Peel, 5 February 1983	4:05
4.	"Sunspots"	John Peel, 29 May 1984	2:55
5.	"Me Singing"	John Peel, 29 May 1984	3:33
6.	"Hobby"	John Peel, 29 May 1984	1:11
7.	"24a. Velocity Crescent"	David Jensen, 5 January 1984	3:47
8.	"Laughing Boy"	David Jensen, 5 January 1984	5:27
9.	"O King of Chaos"	David Jensen, 5 January 1984	2:18
10.	"Reynard the Fox"	David Jensen, 5 January 1984	3:25
11.	"Pulsar"	Janice Long, 12 December 1984	3:33
12.	"Crazy Farm Animal"	Janice Long, 12 December 1984	3:09
13.	"Christmas Mourning"	Janice Long, 12 December 1984	2:58
14.	"Planet Rider: Transmitting"	Janice Long, 6 August 1986	3:50
15.	"Soul Medley": 1. "Free Your Mind And Your Ass Will Follow" (George Clinton, Edward Hazel, Raymond Davis); 2. "Everything Playing at Once"; 3. "Are You Hung Up?" (Frank Zappa); 4. "Hung Up and Hanging Out to Dry"	John Peel, 11 April 1991	8:11
16.	"You Think It's Love"	John Peel, 11 April 1991	1:58
17.	"Double Vegetation"	Richard Skinner, 17 June 1989	3:54

=== 2010 expanded edition ===
The first disc of the expanded edition contains the seventeen tracks from the original album.

Disc two
No.	Title	BBC Session, Recording Date	Length
1.	"Lunatic and Fire Pistol"	John Peel, 5 February 1983	4:24
2.	"Disaster"	Janice Long, 12 December 1984	2:11
3.	"Shot Down"	Janice Long, 6 August 1986	3:55
4.	"World Shut Your Mouth"	Janice Long, 6 August 1986	3:42
5.	"Saint Julian"	BBC Session 1987	2:54
6.	"Trampolene"	BBC Session 1987	3:25
7.	"Ballad of King Plank"	BBC Session 1987	2:44
8.	"Robert Mitchum" (Cope, Ian McCulloch)	Richard Skinner, 17 June 1989	2:32
9.	"The Mystery Trend"	John Peel, 11 April 1991	4:52
10.	"Hanging Out and Hung Up On the Line"	Richard Skinner, 17 June 1989	4:40
11.	"Double Vegetation"	Recorded in concert at Derby Assembly Rooms, 15 June 1991	3:57
12.	"East Easy Rider"	Recorded in concert at Derby Assembly Rooms, 15 June 1991	5:30
13.	"Passionate Friend"	Recorded in concert at Derby Assembly Rooms, 15 June 1991	3:47

== Personnel ==
Credits adapted from the album's liner notes.

Musicians

- Julian Cope – vocals, guitar, bass, keyboards
- Donald Ross Skinner – guitar, bass, keyboards, drums
- Steve "Brother Johnno" Johnson – guitar
- Steve Lovell – guitar
- Anthony "Moon-Eye" Foster – guitar
- James Eller – bass
- Tim Bran – bass
- Joss Cope – keyboards
- Richard "K-R" Frost – keyboards
- Gary Dwyer – drums
- John Dillon – drums
- Chris Whitten – drums
- Mark "Rooster" Cosby – drums

Technical

- Dale Griffin – production (Disc 1 tracks 1–3, 15, 16, Disc 2 tracks 1, 9, 10)
- Mark Radcliffe – production (Disc 1 tracks 4–6)
- John Porter – production (Disc 1 tracks 7–10)
- John Sparrow – production (Disc 1 tracks 11–13, Disc 2 track 2)
- Barry Andrews – production (Disc 1 track 14, Disc 2 tracks 3, 4)
- Harry Parker – production (Disc 1 track 17, Disc 2 track 8)
- Ted de Bono – recording engineer (Disc 1 tracks 1–3, Disc 2 track 1)
- Mike Engles – recording engineer (Disc 1 tracks 4–6)
- Nick Gomm – recording engineer (Disc 1 tracks 14–16, Disc 2 tracks 3, 4, 9, 10)
- Paul Long – recording engineer (Disc 1 tracks 15, 16, Disc 2 tracks 9, 10)
- Martyn Parker – recording engineer (Disc 1 tracks 11–13, Disc 2 track 2)
- Adhikari Allen – recording engineer (Disc 1 track 17, Disc 2 track 8)
- Rob Carter – sleeve artwork
- Donna Ranieri – front cover photography
- Kenji Kubo – back cover photography
- Mick Houghton – liner notes
- Holy McGrail – reissue artwork
