= Skellington =

Skellington may refer to:

- Skellington Productions, a film production company
- Jack Skellington, a character from the 1993 film The Nightmare Before Christmas
- Skellington, a band featuring musician Britt Daniel
- Skellington (album), a 1989 album by Julian Cope
- Skellington 3, a 2018 album by Julian Cope

== See also ==
- "Skelington", a song by Colosseum from their 1971 album Colosseum Live
- Skillington, a village and civil parish in Lincolnshire, England
