= Revolutionary Suicide (album) =

Studio album by Julian Cope
- Released: 20 May 2013
- Genres: Indie rock, lo-fi rock, folk, neo-psychedelia, synth-pop
- Length: 71:03
- Label: Head Heritage
- Producer: Julian Cope

Julian Cope chronology
Woden (2012)	Revolutionary Suicide (2013)	Drunken Songs (2017)

Revolutionary Suicide is the twenty-ninth solo album by Julian Cope, released on 20 May 2013, on Cope's own Head Heritage label.

The album shows a strong folk influence, continuing and expanding on the musical style of Cope's side project Black Sheep, as well as earlier solo albums such as Skellington (1989) and Autogeddon (1994). Retaining the acoustic guitars and large marching bass drum of the Black Sheep material, the sound on Revolutionary Suicide is supplemented by analogue monosynths, Mellotrons, synthesized strings and horns, and programmed rhythms.

Revolutionary Suicide is split between two CDs despite having a total running time that would fit on one disc.

== Themes and musical style ==
The album is named after Black Panther Party co-founder Huey P. Newton’s autobiography. Explaining the album title, Cope told Uncut magazine, "What is revolutionary suicide? For me, it’s Hunter S. Thompson, a practitioner of Western thought to the max, who did all he could and quit honourably [i.e. committed suicide]. It’s the idea of ultimate freedom. In a secular country, where we’re all supposed to be our own Pope, surely we can also be our own hangman if it gets too much?"

Musically, Revolutionary Suicide ranges from folk and rock, with elements of krautrock, to pop-oriented material. Tim Cain of Herald & Review called "Revolutionary Suicide" a "D.I.Y. folk album" with "a wide assortment of 1980s-style simple synths providing color for the sounds". Cope's song arrangements and production, according to AllMusic's Timothy Monger, "hover somewhere between the more lo-fi attempts of his later work and the mid-'90s grandeur of the mono-synth orchestrations he made with former collaborator Thighpaulsandra".

Opening track "Hymn to the Odin" wouldn't have been out of place on Cope's 1994 album Autogeddon, according to Monger, "with its breezy acoustic guitar, Mellotron, and spoken-word verses referencing Anglo-Saxon deities, Waden Hill, and other megalithic sites in the U.K." Pete Redrup of The Quietus also thought that the song is reminiscent of Autogeddon, adding: "It sounds old, but new". Ged McAlea of SoundsXP called it "pastoral, romantic folk music." Rocksucker's Jonny Abrams described the songwriting on the piano-led "Why Did The Chicken Cross My Mind" as a cross between Tom Waits and Ray Davies. According to Pete Redrup, the song "proceeds in a stately fashion over a sparse rhythm, reminiscent of Bowie's 'Five Years'". Uncut magazine's David Cavanagh said of the song's lyrics: "Specifically identifying Islam as homophobic and misogynistic", "Why Did The Chicken Cross My Mind?" attacks liberals who decline to debate the issue, implying that they’re no better than Neville Chamberlain backing out of a confrontation with Hitler".

The Quietus and SoundsXP both highlight the 16 minute epic protest song, "The Armenian Genocide", with The Quietus calling it one of the most powerful tracks Cope's recorded. SoundsXP called it the album's strongest track, describing it as "a powerful and moving tale about ethnic hatred." In the song, according to David Cavanagh, Cope excoriates modern-day Turkey for refusing to recognise the crimes of the Ottoman Empire and "points a bony finger at the world’s conscience and demands the ratification that Armenians have awaited for a century". Cope adopts the character of an Armenian traveller caught up in the death marches of 1915, recounting the tale of a brutal mass starvation. "He adds more and more musical ingredients to the mix, symbolically mirroring the desecrations heaped on the marchers at each stage of their route". For the first 12 minutes it describes the death march in filmic terms, according to Ged McAlea, "and then suddenly locks into the word “people”, repeated hypnotically and relentlessly to convey the hideousness of the crime."

The riff-based title track with its 1960s-sounding Detroit soul talks of corporate "greedheads" and calls for "a new way of thinking", while "Paradise Mislaid" and "In His Cups" represent some of the album's more pop-oriented material. "Paradise Mislaid", according to The New Yorker, "opens with piano-and-drum funk before giving way to a lilting ballad that roundly condemns the habits of modern living". The folky “Mexican Revolution Blues” ends with what David Cavanagh describes as "a sublime coda that materialises like a Harold Budd interlude in a Phil Ochs tune". "Russian Revolution Blues" was described by Ged McAlea as a "political commentary on Cambodia and the Cold War, with some razorsharp wordplay". Both songs, according to Pete Redrup, could "happily blend in on Skellington.

Redrup said of "They Were On Hard Drugs" that it "starts by sounding like a reasonably fortuitous random tour through some of the preprogrammed rhythms from a cheap 80s synth overlaid with one-finger keyboards. This naive simplicity is the intro for a psychedelic history lesson about the evolution of humanity". The New Yorker said it "presents a position paper that theorizes that world history was created with significant pharmacological assistance". Redrup added, "Some great lyrical juxtapositions and the underused Cope falsetto make this a standout track". "Phoney People, Phoney Lives", as described by Redrup, "is dominated by a whistling analogue synth and more marching bass drum, pushing the plaintive vocals further back in the mix". The 11-minute bongo-driven “Destroy Religion”, according to Timothy Monger, "is a testament to the kind of freewheeling experimentalism Cope has long championed". Described by David Cavanagh as "a sound collage featuring bizarre vocalisations and an erratic synthesiser", Cope himself described the song as "Amon Düül I with William Blake on lead vocals."

== Critical reception ==
Professional ratings
Review scores
Source	Rating
AllMusic	4/5 stars
The Great Rock Discography	6/10
Uncut	8/10 stars

The album was well received by music critics. Timothy Monger of AllMusic called it Cope's best work in years and said "His ongoing contempt of right-wing politics, his anti-religious stance, and his frequent references to Pagan gods could, in many cases, make for a pretty unpalatable listen, but somehow Cope pulls it off with humor and a kind of weirdo audacity that few can wield with any conviction." Uncut's David Cavanagh said that the album was among Cope's "finest recent work, equal parts mission statement and sonic eccentricity." Pete Redrup of The Quietus called it Cope's "most cohesive and enjoyable album since 1994's Autogeddon", while The New Yorker called the music "impressive", sounding like "a less polished version of My Nation Underground, with some vintage Who thrown into the mix".

Ged McAlea of SoundsXP said that the album had plenty of examples of Cope "at his most thoughtful and provocative, and also his most pop, but there are examples of where he overbakes his revolutionary spongecake into a soggy mass of inedible hippy wackiness." Jonny Abrams of Rocksucker praised both music and lyrics, calling Cope an "engrossingly surreal yet pointed lyricist" and said "It’s actually quite ridiculous how great Revolutionary Suicide is. At this stage of Julian Cope’s career, it is an especially monumental achievement." Tim Cain of Herald & Review called it "the most captivating album I've heard all year."

== Track listing ==
All tracks written by Julian Cope.

Disc One

1. "Hymn to the Odin" – 7:10
2. "Why Did the Chicken Cross My Mind?" – 6:47
3. "The Armenian Genocide" – 15:58

Disc Two

1. "Revolutionary Suicide" – 3:19
2. "Paradise Mislaid" – 4:45
3. "Mexican Revolution Blues" – 3:04
4. "Russian Revolution Blues" – 3:08
5. "They Were on Hard Drugs" – 7:18
6. "In His Cups" – 5:45
7. "Phoney People, Phoney Lives" – 2:37
8. "Destroy Religion" – 11:04

Poetry (printed in booklet)

1. "The Khaledonian"
2. "Revolutionary"
3. "Gurdjung"

== Personnel ==
- Julian Cope – vocals, instruments, producer, directed by, artwork
- Antony "Antronhy de La O " Hodgkinson – recorded by
- Christopher Patrick "Holy" McGrail – design
