= Self Civil War =

Studio album by Julian Cope
- Released: 10 January 2020
- Genre: Folk; psychedelic rock; krautrock
- Length: 71:55
- Label: Head Heritage

Julian Cope chronology
John Balance Enters Valhalla (2019)	Self Civil War (2020)

Professional ratings
Review scores
Source	Rating
Mojo	4/5 stars
Uncut	8/10

Self Civil War is the thirty-fourth solo album by Julian Cope, released on his own label, Head Heritage. The album was available through his website on 10 January 2020. It is the first release in Cope's intended Our Troubled Times series, and like many of Cope's previous albums, Self Civil War is sequenced into four distinct phases. The album title is taken from a poem written in the late 1630s by English clergyman Roger Brereley.

== Critical reception ==
Roy Wilkinson of Mojo magazine wrote that Self Civil War recalls Cope's Island years, with 1992's Jehovahkill being a particular touchstone. Wilkinson noted the production's "particular DIY agenda," writing, "but this becomes part of an ambitious totality, one rich in melody, arrangement and subject matter." With acoustic ballads, "Eddie Hazelesque guitar pyrotechnics" and "surprisingly catchy grooves," Tom Pinnock of Uncut magazine felt that the album is one of Cope's classics. He also felt that Cope's wordplay is on top form. Bill Pearis of The Brooklyn Vegan website wrote, "There are cosmic psych jams, krautrock rhythms, mellotrons, cheesy synths, sound effects, mushroom tea folk, sea shanties, ren-fair ditties about norse gods, the terrible things we're doing to our planet every minute, plus anti-technology parables ... and at least a couple songs about drugs." Pearis concluded that "it's all rather charming, with great wit, empathy and no shortage of melody, either."

== Track listing ==
All lyrics and music written by Julian Cope, except where noted

Phase 1
No.	Title	Length
1.	"That Aint No Way to Make a Million"	7:22
2.	"A Cosmic Flash"	6:40
3.	"You Will Be Mist"	5:32

Phase 2
No.	Title	Length
4.	"The Great Raven"	5:53
5.	"Berlin Facelift"	6:29
6.	"Immortal"	4:13

Phase 3
No.	Title	Length
7.	"Einstein"	6:01
8.	"Billy"	1:47
9.	"A Dope on Drugs"	4:15
10.	"Your Facebook, My Laptop"	2:52

Phase 4
No.	Title	Lyrics	Music	Length
11.	"Requiem for a Dead Horse"		Cope, William Waine	11:49
12.	"'Self Civil War'"	Roger Brereley		1:12
13.	"A Victory Dance"			7:50

== Personnel ==
Credits adapted from the album's liner notes.

- Julian Cope – vocals, instruments
- Philippe Legènde – drums, bongos, engineer
- Christopher Holman – lead guitar on "That Aint No Way to Make a Million", "A Cosmic Flash" and "A Victory Dance"
- Fat Paul – drums on "Requiem for a Dead Horse"
- Cheeky – trumpet
- Keith – trumpet
- Avalon Cope – design
