= Rome Wasn't Burned in a Day =

Studio album by Julian Cope
- Released: 2003
- Genre: Rock, psychedelic rock
- Length: 54:20
- Label: Head Heritage

Julian Cope chronology
Rite Now (2002)	Rome Wasn't Burned in a Day (2003)	Citizen Cain'd (2005)

Professional ratings
Review scores
Source	Rating
Allmusic	3/5 stars
Encyclopedia of Popular Music	4/5 stars
The Great Rock Discography	6/10

Rome Wasn't Burned in a Day is the nineteenth solo album by Julian Cope, released in 2003.

Released to coincide with a three-night festival of the same name, organised by Cope, on 30 October, 31 October and 1 November 2003 in London. The album was only made available via Cope's own Head Heritage website.

== Track listing ==
All tracks written by Julian Cope

1. "Shrine of the Black Youth" – 8:19
2. "Zennor Quoit" – 2:43
3. "The-Way-Luv-Is" – 10:12
4. "King Minos" – 4:22
5. "Dance by the Light of the Bridges You Burn" – 3:32
6. "Michelle of My Former Self / Far Out" – 4:31
7. "Eccentrifugal Force" – 20:40

Note

"Far Out" is listed as a separate track on the album cover.

== Personnel ==
Credits adapted from the album's liner notes.

- Julian Cope – vocals
- Donald Ross Skinner – guitar, bass
- Anthony "Doggen" Foster – guitar, bass
- Christopher Patrick "Holy" McGrail – synthesizer
- Gavin Skinner – drums
- Recorded by Adam Whittaker, Terry Dobbin, L.S. Deeds, Hugoth Nicolson
