= Fear Loves This Place =

1992 single by Julian Cope

Single by Julian Cope

from the album Jehovahkill
- B-side: "Straw Dogs", "Anyway At All", "Bagged-Out Ken"
- Released: 5 October 1992
- Length: 4:17
- Label: Island
- Songwriter: Julian Cope
- Producers: Julian Cope, Donald Ross Skinner

Julian Cope singles chronology
"Head" (1991)	"Fear Loves This Place" (1992)	"Try Try Try" (1995)

"Fear Loves This Place" is a song by English singer-songwriter Julian Cope. It was the only single released in support of his album Jehovahkill.

== Charts ==
Chart (1992)	Peak position
UK Singles (OCC)	42
