= Floored Genius 3 – Julian Cope's Oddicon of Lost Rarities & Versions 1978–98 =

Compilation album by Julian Cope
- Released: 2000
- Recorded: 1978–1998
- Genre: Rock; psychedelic rock; post-punk
- Length: 58:04
- Label: Head Heritage
- Producer: Julian Cope; Donald Ross Skinner; Steve Lovell

Julian Cope chronology
Odin (1999)	Floored Genius 3 – Julian Cope's Oddicon of Lost Rarities & Versions 1978–98 (2000)	An Audience with the Cope 2000 (2000)

Professional ratings
Review scores
Source	Rating
Encyclopedia of Popular Music	3/5 stars

Floored Genius 3 – Julian Cope's Oddicon of Lost Rarities & Versions 1978–98 is a rarities compilation album by Julian Cope, released in 2000 on Cope's own Head Heritage label.

It contains previously unreleased demos, studio and live recordings, as well as a few previously released tracks, such as the two rare singles, "Competition" and "Propheteering". Many of the tracks were recorded during periods when Cope was in between record deals.

== Track listing ==
All tracks are written by Julian Cope, except "Satisfaction" by Mick Jagger and Keith Richards

No.	Title	Length
1.	"Ascending"	2:59
2.	"Conspiracist Blues"	1:53
3.	"Propheteering"	1:57
4.	"Mighty Carl Jung"	8:55
5.	"Highway Blues"	2:57
6.	"Sqwubbsy Versus King Plank"	4:27
7.	"You Can't Hurt Me Anymore"	3:50
8.	"Oh Yeah, but Never Like This Before"	4:23
9.	"The One I Call My Own"	4:25
10.	"Jellypop Perky Jean" (Alternative version)	3:10
11.	"Tighten-Up"	2:45
12.	"Zabriskie Point" (Live)	4:40
13.	"I Need Someone"	2:36
14.	"Prince Varmint"	1:59
15.	"Competition"	2:24
16.	"Satisfaction"	4:43

=== Notes ===
Adapted from the album's liner notes, except where noted.

- "Ascending" – Three recordings exists of this song. This is the most recent version from 1998, featuring Thighpaulsandra's string and flutes arrangement.
- "Conspiracist Blues" – Recorded live at The Lemon Tree in Aberdeen during Cope's first Highlands & Islands Tour of Scotland, according to the album's liner notes, but is in fact a studio recording.
- "Propheteering" – 7" single released in 1997 as a limited edition.
- "Mighty Carl Jung" – Recorded soon after Island dropped Cope in November 1992. It was forgotten until 1997, when Cope overdubbed a Mellotron at Thighpaulsandra's studio.
- "Highway Blues" – Released in 1995 on The Big Issue South LP. Recorded soon after Island dropped Cope in November 1992.
- "Sqwubbsy Versus King Plank" – "A particularly arch protometal version of this weird glam song," according to the album's liner notes.
- "You Can't Hurt Me Anymore" – Written for the E. Man Groovin' session with Hugoth and Tom Nicolson, Tim Bran and Gorby Butterworth. This is a later version recorded in Liverpool. The Mellotron was overdubbed during Thigpaulsandra's 1997 remix.
- "Oh Yeah, but Never Like This Before" – Recorded by Cope with the band The Sons Of T.C. Lethbridge.
- "The One I Call My Own" – One of three recorded versions and originally attempted as a potential single, then dropped as being too long. The Mellotron was added during Thigpaulsandra's 1997 remix
- "Jellypop Perky Jean" – This new version was recorded in 1993, as several A&R men viewed it as a potential single.
- "Tighten-Up" – Recorded in two hours for a live mime on Japanese television. The audience was dubbed on later by the TV company.
- "Zabriskie Point" – A live recording. The studio version was lost when Cope moved to the West Country in 1992.
- "I Need Someone" and "Prince Varmint" – When I.R.S. Records showed interest in Cope, c. 1985, his manager paid for these two songs to be recorded along with several others, some of which are now lost.
- "Competition" – 7" single released in 1985 by Cope under the name Rabbi Joseph Gordan and limited to 2000 copies. Produced by Steve Lovell, credited as Bernard Gazda.
- "Satisfaction" – Recorded in June 1978 at Will Sergeant's home studio. It was the result of a collaboration between Sergeant and Paul Simpson's band Industrial Domestic and Cope.

== Personnel ==
Credits adapted from the album's liner notes.

Musicians

- Julian Cope – vocals, guitar, bass, keyboards
- Donald Ross Skinner – guitar, keyboards, drums
- Terry "Doggen" Dobbin – guitar
- Anthony "Moon-Eye" Foster – guitar
- Will Sergeant – guitar
- Steve "Johnno" Johnson – bass
- James Eller – bass
- Thighpaulsandra – synthesizer
- Mark "Rooster" Cosby – drums
- Chris Whitten – drums
- Kevin Bales – drums
- Mike Joyce – drums
- Dorian Cope (credited as "Mavis Grind") – vocals on "Ascending"
- Paul Simpson – vocals on "Satisfaction"

Technical

- Julian Cope – producer, art direction, compiled by
- Donald Ross Skinner – producer
- Steve Lovell – producer
- Thighpaulsandra – recording engineer, remastering
- Hugo Nicolson – recording engineer
- David Wrench – recording engineer
- Paul "Chas" Watkins – recording engineer
- Shaun Harvey – recording engineer
- Lisa Bennett – art direction
- Ed Sirrs – cover photography
- Smelly Elly – back photography
- Dorian Cope – compiled by
- Joanne Wilder – compiled by
