= Drunken Song =

Drunken Song or variants may refer to:

- "The Drunken Song", second last chapter of poem Zarathustra's roundelay by Friedrich Nietzsche
- Drunken Songs (Ebbri canti), poem by Umberto Saba
- Drunken Songs (album), album by Julian Cope 2017
- Suika (酔歌, Drunken Song), 1990 single by Ikuzo Yoshi
- Das trunkene Lied ("The Drunken Song") for chorus and orchestra, first public success of Oskar Fried
- Yopparatta Song (Drunken Song) by Appa (band)
