= Skellington 3 =

Studio album by Julian Cope
- Released: 10 April 2018
- Recorded: 17–19 February 2018
- Genre: Rock
- Length: 37:47
- Label: Head Heritage
- Producer: Julian Cope

Julian Cope chronology
Rite At Ya (2017)	Skellington 3 (2018)

Professional ratings
Review scores
Source	Rating
Mojo	3/5 stars
Uncut	8/10 stars

Skellington 3 is the thirty-second solo album by Julian Cope, released in April 2018. The album's sub-title is "The All-New 21st Century Adventures of Skellington". It is the third album in the Skellington series following the earlier albums Skellington (1989) and Skellington 2 (1993).

== Background ==
Julian Cope said of the album: "in a conversation with my wife Dorian our discussion about the forthcoming 25th anniversary of The Skellington Chronicles reminded me how refreshing it had been to record all those orphan songs free from the restraints of creating a coherent whole. ... I ransacked my current iPhone for orphan songs and selected 12 for immediate recording as Skellington 3 at the Wiltshire studio of Philippe Legènde. Same loose attitude as before, same techniques, same acid campfire spirit".

== Critical reception ==
In his review for Uncut magazine, Jon Dale rated the album 8 out of 10, describing it as "Amon Düül circa Paradieswärts Düül covering The Seeds." According to Dale, the album shows Cope as a "stumbling folk shaman, acoustic guitar in hand, calling out the kingdom's ills." Mojo magazine's Andrew Perry gave the album 3 stars out of 5, writing that the "gimmickry" and "casualty savant lyricism" of the two previous Skellington albums have been replaced by a "latterday street-fighting consciousness" and "alarmingly unribald observations on ageing". Perry felt that the late 10s Julian Cope "somehow manifests too lucidly for the Skellington franchise" and called for "more acid".

== Track listing ==
All tracks are written by Julian Cope

Phase One
No.	Title	Length
1.	"Times Change"	3:19
2.	"At the Start of a Season"	2:11
3.	"Stop Harping On About the Way Life Used to Be"	3:04
4.	"Magic Fortune-Telling Machine"	2:51
5.	"It's Not Your Life (So Do What We Want)"	2:34
6.	"Parallel University"	4:15

Phase Two
No.	Title	Length
7.	"That Don't Make a Revolution"	3:32
8.	"Very Krishna"	3:02
9.	"Seel Street Waltz"	3:08
10.	"Slave to Rock'n'roll"	2:21
11.	"Catch Your Dreams Before They Slip Away"	2:57
12.	"A Flick of the 'V's"	4:33

== Personnel ==
- Julian Cope – vocals, instruments, production, liner notes
- Philippe Legènde – drums, bongos, recording
- Hornette Weinstein – horns on "Stop Harping On About the Way Life Used to Be"
- Donato Cinicolo – photography
- Avalon Cope – design
