= Citizen Cain'd =

Studio album by Julian Cope
- Released: January 2005
- Genre: Rock, garage rock
- Length: 71:38
- Label: Head Heritage
- Producer: Julian Cope

Julian Cope chronology
| Rome Wasn't Burned in a Day (2003) | Citizen Cain'd (2005) | Dark Orgasm (2005) |

Professional ratings
Review scores
| Source | Rating |
|---|---|
| AllMusic | 4/5 stars |
| The Guardian | 4/5 stars |
| Uncut | 3/5 stars |

Citizen Cain'd is the twentieth solo album by Julian Cope, released in January 2005. The album was released as two CDs of 34 and 37 minutes respectively because Cope deemed several of the songs "too psychologically exhausting" for one single listen.

Blending Stooges-style garage rock and stoner rock grooves, country rock and balladry, Citizen Cain'd has been described as "an excellent return to song-based songwriting" and "best Cope album in a decade".

== Track listing ==
Disc one
| No. | Title | Length |
|---|---|---|
| 1. | "Hell Is Wicked" | 4:42 |
| 2. | "I Can't Hardly Stand It" | 3:10 |
| 3. | "I'm Living in the Room They Found Saddam In" | 4:26 |
| 4. | "Gimme Head" | 3:49 |
| 5. | "Dying to Meet You" | 4:46 |
| 6. | "I Will Be Absorbed" | 13:47 |
| Total length: | | 34:42 |

Disc two
| No. | Title | Length |
|---|---|---|
| 1. | "Feels Like a Crying Shame" | 11:32 |
| 2. | "World War Pigs" | 4:14 |
| 3. | "Stomping Dionysus" | 2:41 |
| 4. | "Homeless Strangers" | 3:40 |
| 5. | "Living Dead" | 4:59 |
| 6. | "Edge of Death" | 9:38 |
| Total length: | | 36:56 (71:38) |

== Personnel ==
Musicians

- Julian Cope
- Anthony "Doggen" Foster
- David "Mitch Razor" Francolini
- Christopher Patrick "Holy" McGrail
- Mrs Helen Ramsay
- Donald Ross Skinner

Technical

- Recorded by David Francolini, Terry Dobbin
- Design by Holy McGrail
- Mastered by Adam "Randy Apostle" Whittaker
