= Jehovahkill =

Studio album by Julian Cope
- Released: 19 October 1992
- Recorded: 1991–1992
- Studio: Fallout Shelter Studios, London; Fortress Studios, London
- Genre: Folk; psychedelic rock; krautrock; acid rock; post-punk
- Length: 70:19
- Label: Island
- Producer: Julian Cope; Donald Ross Skinner

Julian Cope chronology
Peggy Suicide (1991)	Jehovahkill (1992)	Rite (1993)

Singles from Jehovahkill
- 1. "Fear Loves This Place" Released: October 1992

Jehovahkill is the eighth album by Julian Cope, released in 1992. After the critical success of Peggy Suicide (1991), Cope's idea for Jehovakill was to incorporate a krautrock attitude into his music. He began recording the album with musicians Rooster Cosby and Donald Ross Skinner, while co-producing it with the latter. The sessions yielded what Cope considered to be his most sonically experimental material to date. Originally titling the record Julian H. Cope, he sent an eleven track version to Island Records, who initially rejected its release, but gave Cope extra recording sessions for the album. During the extra sessions, in which six extra songs were recorded, the album became harder and was retitled Jehovahkill.

Inspired by prehistoric monuments, the album features ancient, pre-Christian heathen and pagan themes, while commenting on "the destructiveness of mainstream religion." The theme spread to the packaging, with the cover depicting the Callanish Stones, a site with a cruciform layout that predates Christ by at least 2,000 years. Musically, the album combines krautrock with a dark folk sound. Upon release, it reached number 20 on the UK Albums Chart, although Island Records dropped him soon after its release, leading to outrage in the music press. The album proved to be one of Cope's biggest critical successes. Select later named it the 36th best album of the 1990s, and NME named it the 95th greatest British album ever. A deluxe edition was released in 2006.

== Recording and development ==
Julian Cope's seventh album and fifth album for Island Records, Peggy Suicide (1991), concerned itself with environmental issues, and was a critical comeback for Cope, if not quite a commercial one. During the world tour in promotion of Peggy Suicide, Julian Cope, his guitarist, drummer and saxophonist Rooster Cosby and guitar technician Rizla Deutsch, all of whom listened to krautrock in the early 1970s, had debated "the psychie mix that had created krautrock's singular take on Western music," and reached the conclusion that they could distill "the krautrock psyche" into a complete attitude which they would then apply to Cope's new album, much like that had with the R&B and Detroit soul styles on Peggy Suicide.

After the world tour in promotion of Peggy Suicide ended in August 1991, Julian Cope entered the studio to record his next album with Cosby, Deutsch and keyboardist Donald Ross Skinner, with Cope and Skinner co-producing the album. Cope biographer Mick Houghton said that most of the album was recorded at the in-house studios of Island Records. Nonetheless, Skinner exempted himself from co-producing four of the album's songs while he worked with other musicians, and during this period, Cope, Cosby and Deutsch reconvened to the cheap, 16-track machine-equipped South London recording studio belonging to Shaun Harvey, in order for Cope to visit his wife at the nearby King's College Hospital as they awaited their first child. In Harvey's studio, they recorded on second-hand tape. According to Cope, the "results were certainly more sonically imbalanced and experimental" than anything he had previously achieved.

In 1992 Cope delivered his eleven-track Julian H. Cope album to Island Records. However, its "dark and challenging" content, with its lowly mixed drums and highly mixed vocals, was not well received by the label, with their managing director Marc Marot calling it "the most sonically unappealing album he'd ever heard," and Cope's A&R man going as far as to describe "Slow Rider" as "the worst song he'd heard by anybody in his life". As such, Island refused to issue the album. When Cope explained that it was what he had set out to achieve and "would prefer to stand or fall by the results," Marot allowed him additional recording sessions at the label's Fallout Shelter Studios. Although the existing content remained almost untouched, the album, re-titled Jehovahkill, was "ameliorated" with six further songs, including "Fa-Fa-Fa-Fine", "The Mystery Trend" and "No Hard Shoulder To Cry On". Cope noted the extra recording sessions made the album heavier and "more heathen" than it had been in its previous incarnation, with one session culminated prematurely after smoke emitted from the studio's multi-core processor.

== Themes ==
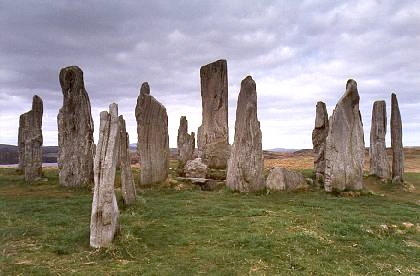
The Callanish Stones are depicted on the album cover.

Cope would later describe Jehovahkill as the second instalment of an album trilogy that concerns Mother Earth, with the first being Peggy Suicide and the third being Autogeddon; in particular, Jehovahkill departs from the environmental concerns of Peggy Suicide and instead celebrates ancient, pre-Christianity heathen impulses, while noting what Cope, a self-described Odinist, believed to be "the destructiveness of mainstream religion." As a result, the prehistoric landscape was a big influence on Jehovahkill. Cope said at the time of the release that his interest in such subjects "just seemed to start from my life, I just found myself staggering towards it, really. It certainly wasn't anything I had been interested in before, but I found myself led down this route by reading people like Gurdjieff, then [Colin] Wilson and then on to Lethbridge." Cope coined the term "megalithomania" for his new found interests, and wrote about it in the liner notes, where he describes the album as "concerning the Kelt and the Kraut, the cross and the serpent; and various related female issues that the mother would wish us to know." The album also explores parenthood, as Cope had recently become a father.

The album name, a pun of Jehovah and "overkill", was described by journalist Andy Gill as perhaps referring "to the Judaeo-Christian repression of our natural pagan energies and inclinations; or perhaps to the kicking Cope hands out here to the deity." The album cover depicts the Callanish Stones on the Isle of Lewis, a Neolithic site with a cruciform layout that predates Christ by at least 2,000 years. Cope had been photographed lying next to the monument on the cover of the Peggy Suicide single "Head"; the sleeve of Jehovahkill, in contrast, uses a golden aerial plan of the monument on a vivid blue background. In his book How the Neolithics Influenced Rock 'n' Roll, Andrew Johnstone called the cover design a "bold iconographic approach," writing that "[t]he isolation of the monument's structure emphasises its completeness and the dramatic statement the builders made far greater than a photograph would. The monument moves away from being a stone structure, to that of being a motif or logo."

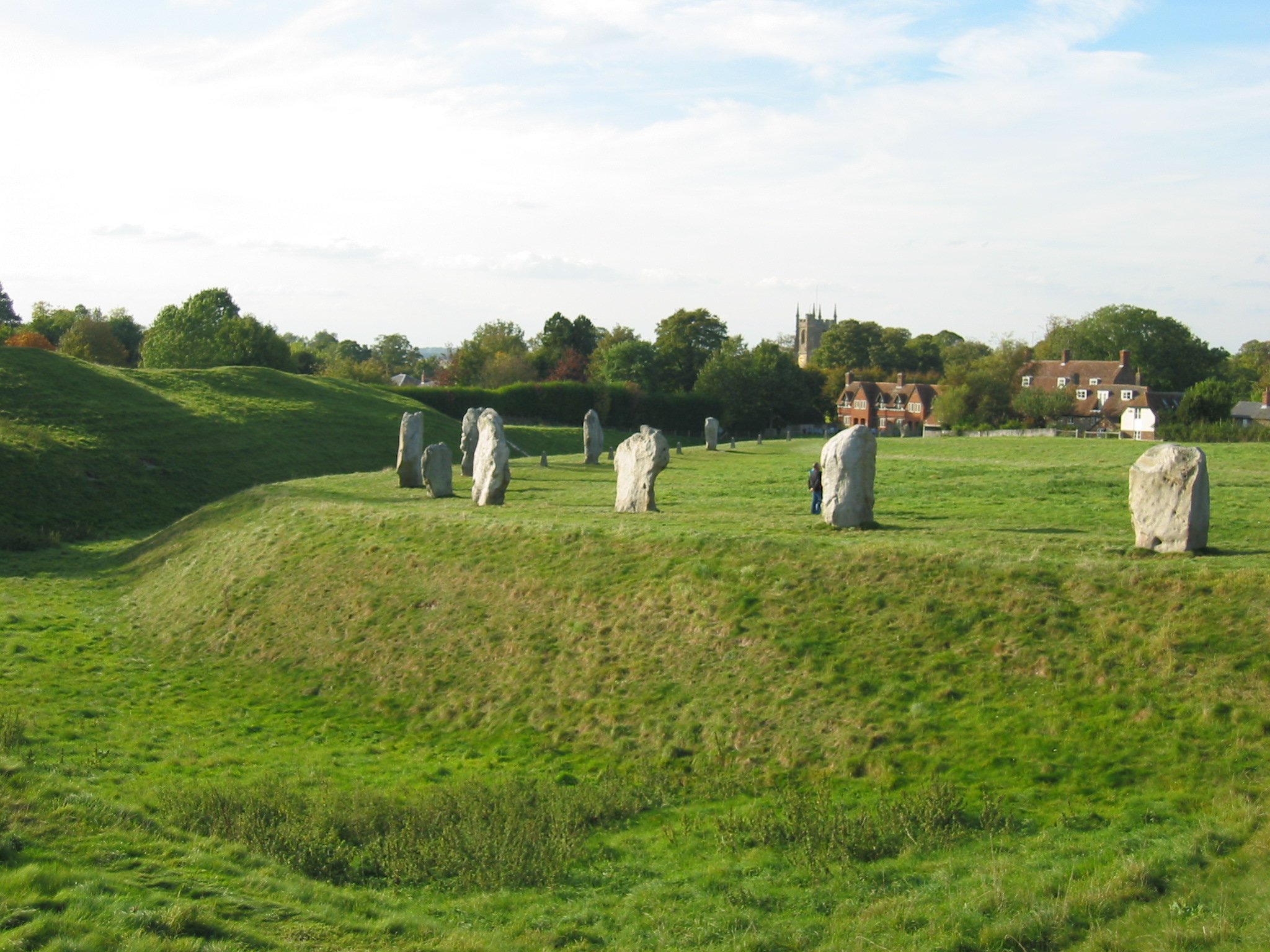
Avebury stone circle.

In the liner notes is a depiction of the Neolithic henge monument and stone circles at Avebury, Wiltshire, built some 5,000 years ago, with accompanying text written by Cope, who invited listeners to visit the monument. Cope had photographed Avebury for the sleeve of Peggy Suicide, and finding the monument's "pull" to be so great, he moved to the village of Avebury with his family in early 1992. Cope provided commentary on various other ancient megalithic sites and temples, alongside some of his own attendant poetry, throughout the rest of the booklet.

"Akhenaten" has been described as "an investigation on Society's obsession with Christ," while "Fear Loves This Place" has been interpreted by critic Dave Morrison as "a tale of domestic brutality." Asked by Kevin Jackson of The Independent if he thought the album's themes would alienate fans, Cope replied: "Oh, loads, but I never started out my career with any intention of tugging along all of them, and I've alienated people throughout. If I've had a period of real obscurity, I've alienated people who want me to be a pop singer. I'll go back and have hits, and I alienate people who are so messed up they only want delicate flowers to be their heroes. But hopefully I'll haul a few more along as well."

== Musical style ==
Despite Jehovahkill's heathen themes, Ned Raggett of AllMusic described the album as primarily a musical project, with the music being "first and foremost" ahead of the lyrics. Loose and groove-oriented in style, the 70-minute album is split into three separate "Phases," – "Phase 1" (tracks 1–6), "Phase 2" (tracks 7–11) and "Phase 3" (tracks 12–16), – not unlike the concept of four "Phases" on Peggy Suicide. Ivan Krielkamp of Spin magazine considers it a concept album and "a Tommy for the eco-generation." Cope described Jehovahkill as containing a "heathen, dark folk sound," while Jon Savage of The Guardian noted the appearance of a "melodic folk" sound. Furthermore, the album incorporates acid rock and especially krautrock, being inspired by 1970s bands that had influenced Cope before such as Can, Faust, and Neu!, although this time the influence was larger. Uncut wrote that the album contains a "mad scramble" of krautrock, pop and techno dance music, while Jim DeRogatis called it psychedelic rock. Cavanagh highlights its array of "blowouts", melodic pop, funk, and "a mad rush instrumental".

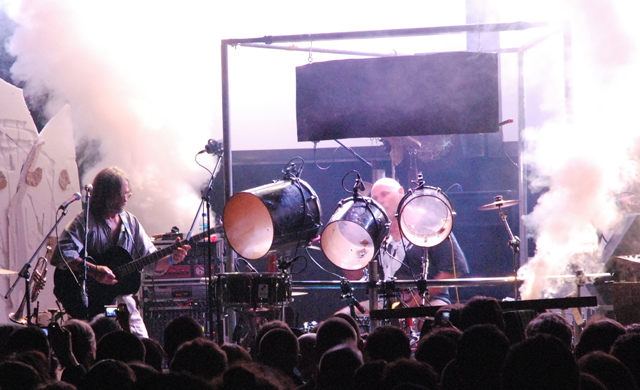
Krautrock bands such as Faust (pictured in 2007) were a key influence on Jehovahkill.

Many of the songs start with simplistic acoustic guitar intros before, according to Andy Gill of The Independent, developing via overdub "accretions", "some into retro-hippy jams of boundless cosmicity like 'Necropolis', some into rave chants like 'Poet Is Priest...'." "Soul Desert" was described by Raggett as picking up "where Peggy Suicide left off with 'Las Vegas Basement', with the same low-key late-night vibe." Cope sings both subtly and hardly on the track, which becomes more uptempo in its second half. The tuneful, laid-back "The Mystery Trend" was described by Raggett as "rural blues-gone-drone rock." The instrumental "Necropolis" bears a strong krautrock influence, revealing Cope's infatuation with 1970s German rock music, and was cited as one of the "absurd" tracks on the album, alongside "No Hard Shoulder to Cry On" and "Know (Cut My Friend Down)", by critic Alec Foege.

Starting with a garage rock riff before centring on numerous soundscapes, with one of the few lyrics being its title, "Poet Is Priest…" is a krautrock funk song, featuring "acoustic astrology" from astronomer and musician Fiorella Terenzi, and rave influences. An unedited version, running to almost 22 minutes, was included on the bonus disc of the 2006 deluxe edition of the album. The self-mocking "Julian H. Cope" was described by Foege as "an ironic advertisement" for the musician. A tribute to both Neu! and The Stooges, "The Subtle Energies Commission", centred around a whooshing drum and cymbal rhythm, features numerous phased drums and touches of reverbed keyboard. "Fa-Fa-Fa-Fine" is a pop song with a regenerative lyrical theme, while "Peggy Suicide is Missing" serves as the album's coda.

== Release ==
"I played JehovahKill to Island. They said: 'Not another double, people don't have time to wade through those anymore.' I think they've got all the time in the world. Island imagine my career is in tatters after every record, but Peggy Suicide sold 60,000 copies. Now this is my eleventh album, and I'm just about to blow it. Again."

—Julian Cope, September 1992

Jehovahkill was released on 19 October 1992 by Island Records; its CD release was pressed onto a single-disc, while the LP was packaged as a double album pressed onto only three sides, one for each "Phase", with the fourth side showing an etching instead. A double disc special edition with an extra disc entitled Jehovahkill Companion, comprising outtakes from the sessions, was also issued. The ballad "Fear Loves This Place" was issued as the album's only single, and reached number 42 on the UK Singles Chart in October. The album debuted at number 20 on the UK Albums Chart two weeks later, before falling to number 39 the following week. The artwork designer behind the American release of the album renamed "Necropolis" to "Necropolis (Neu 2)" without permission from Cope, who later reflected the designer had not heard of Neu!, so the word was meaningless to them but "in a matter which satisfied them."

Within a week of the album's release, Island Records dropped Cope from their roster, claiming, "his critical appeal is on the up but his commercial appeal is dropping." The dismissal caused a large amount outrage in the music press, with Select even publishing the "Drude Aid" form, with the intention of mailing it to Marot, asking why the label dropped Cope instead of several "lame head" acts signed to the label. Houghton reflected that Cope's popularity surged in the aftermath, appearing on the cover of the NME in January 1993 with the headline "Endangered Species" and, in two parallel readers' polls for "Best Male Artist" in NME and Melody Maker, he came second in the former poll after Morrissey and third in the latter. At the time of the dropping, Cope had just recorded Rite, which instead saw release in Germany in 1994. In October 2006, a "Second Edition" of Jehvoahkill was released by Island Records, containing material from Julian H. Cope and the "Fear Loves This Place" single including the Dictaphone-recorded "Nothing".

== Critical reception ==
Professional ratings
Review scores
Source	Rating
AllMusic	4/5 stars
Classic Rock	7/10 stars
Entertainment Weekly	B+
The Great Rock Discography	7/10
Q	3/5 stars
Rolling Stone	3.5/5 stars
Select	4/5 stars

Jehovahkill was well received by music critics. Cope biographer Mick Houghton reflected that some critics called it Cope's best album since Fried and "a deeply fascinating work," while Uncut said "it was arguably Cope’s biggest critical success." Dave DiMartino of Entertainment Weekly wrote that "Jehovahkill sounds like a guy with great taste having an orgy in a recording studio — and echoing everybody he's ever liked in the process. Bless his burnt-out heart." Andy Gill of The Independent called it "one of the week's more inspired albums" and noted "an odd wholeness to the project, the kind of result only possible when an artist takes a flier and pursues his personal vision, heedless of fashion," while David Cavanagh of Select wrote: "Spend the rest of your life making sense of Jehovahkill, ye Kelts and Krauts alike, and salute the soul of Julian H Cope."

Describing the album as a "strange but soothing act of rebellion," Alec Foege of Spin felt Jehovahkill was the musician's most consistent record to date, saying Cope "pontificates less and crafts better melodies" and figured his "message to the universe" as "remarkably selfless and sane." Among retrospective reviews, Ned Raggett of AllMusic described it as "another fine Cope album," and commented: "If Jehovahkill isn't quite as perfectly balanced as Peggy Suicide, it comes darn close, definitely leaving the late-'80s trough behind." Also writing for AllMusic in a biography on Cope, James Christopher Monger called 'the record "another creative triumph." In The Great Rock Discography, Martin C. Strong called the album "an admirable effort."

Select ranked the album at number 7 in their year-end Top 50 Albums of 1992 list, and later at number 36 in their top 100 best albums of the 1990s list. Jim DeRogatis listed Jehovahkill as a key psychedelic rock album in his 1996 book Kaleidoscope Eyes: Psychedelic Rock From the 1960s to the 1990s. In 2006, NME ranked Jehovahkill at number 95 in their list of "The 100 Greatest British Albums Ever!" In a 2017 list for The Quietus, Britt Daniel of the rock band Spoon included Jehovahkill in a list of his 13 favourite albums, calling it "the peak of his experimentation. It's also really great songwriting. It's a very, very kraut-influenced record. it's an expansive record. It was three sides. Not a full double album but it was three sides and on the fourth side you had an etching. He was always doing things like that. He was putting thought into it." Daniel regularly performed a cover version of "Up-Wards at 45°" at solo shows. In another list for The Quietus, Kid Millions of Man Forever named it as one of his favourite albums. Ben Graham of the website called the album a "masterpiece."

== Track listing ==
All tracks are written by Julian Cope, except where noted.

Phase 1
No.	Title	Length
1.	"Soul Desert"	3:53
2.	"No Hard Shoulder to Cry On"	2:44
3.	"Akhenaten"	2:52
4.	"The Mystery Trend"	4:17
5.	"Up-Wards at 45°"	5:46
6.	"Know (Cut My Friend Down)"	3:19

Phase 2
No.	Title	Writer(s)	Length
7.	"Necropolis"		4:40
8.	"Slow Rider"		2:18
9.	"Gimme Back My Flag"	Cope, Donald Ross Skinner	5:33
10.	"Poet Is Priest..."	Cope, Rooster Cosby, Hugoth Nicolson, Skinner	6:23
11.	"Julian H. Cope"		2:49

Phase 3
No.	Title	Writer(s)	Length
12.	"The Subtle Energies Commission"		7:49
13.	"Fa-Fa-Fa-Fine"		2:25
14.	"Fear Loves This Place"		4:16
15.	"The Tower"		10:23
16.	"Peggy Suicide Is Missing"	Cope, Skinner	0:42
Total length:			70:19

=== 2006 deluxe edition (second edition) ===
Disc one

- as per original edition

Disc two

Phase 4
No.	Title	Writer(s)	Length
1.	"Nothing"		2:07
2.	"I Have Always Been Here Before"	Roky Erickson	4:41
3.	"This Is My Kin"		4:22
4.	"Michael Rother"		4:41
5.	"Gogmagog"		2:51
6.	"Gone"	Cope, Cosby, Skinner	5:02

Phase 5
No.	Title	Writer(s)	Length
7.	"Vivien"		3:03
8.	"You Gotta Show"		4:43
9.	"Sqwubbsy The Olmec"	Cope, Cosby, Skinner	1:50
10.	"Sizewell B"		4:46
11.	"Paleface"	Cope, Cosby, Skinner	5:02
12.	"Free"		5:05

Phase 6
No.	Title	Writer(s)	Length
13.	"Poet Is Priest..." (original 21.36 mix)	Cope, Cosby, Nicolson, Skinner	21:28
14.	"Starry Eyes"		7:11
Total length:			77:00

Notes

- Tracks 1, 2, 5, 10, 11 and 14 are from the Fear Loves This Place EP. Tracks 3, 4, 6–9, 12 and 13 are previously unreleased session outtakes.

== Charts ==
Chart (1992)	Peak position
UK Albums Chart	20

== Personnel ==
Adapted from the album liner notes.

Musicians

- Julian Cope – vocals, wah-wah guitar, bass, ARP Quartet (disc two: 9)
- Donald Ross Skinner – keyboards, bass, guitar (16), Jew's harp (disc two: 9), Omnichord (disc two: 2), guitar solo (disc two: 12), bass piano (disc two: 3)
- Mark "Rooster" Cosby – drums, saxophone, guitar solo (6, 9, 10 / disc two: 6, 11), glockenspiel (disc two: 1, 7, 13)
- Hugoth Nicolson – analog synthesizer
- Tom Nicolson – harmonica (4)
- Shaun Harvey – Harveytron (6, 7 / disc two: 14), samples (disc two: 14)
- Anthony "Doggen" Foster – guitar (7)
- Fiorella Terenzi – acoustic astronomy (10 / disc two: 13)
- Joss Cope – vocals (disc two: 2)

Technical

- Donald Ross Skinner – production
- Julian Cope – production, mastering (deluxe edition), liner notes (deluxe edition)
- Hugoth Nicolson – recording, mixing
- Paul Corkett – recording, mixing
- Shaun Harvey – recording, mixing
- Santy – assistant
- Robo – assistant
- Rob Carter – design, artwork
- James Dowdall – executive producer
- Chris Olley – editing, tape transfer (disc two)
- Shawn Joseph – mastering (deluxe edition)
- Holy McGrail – artwork (deluxe edition)
- Mick Houghton – liner notes, executive producer (deluxe edition)
