= Drunken Songs =

Studio album by Julian Cope
- Released: February 2017
- Genre: Rock
- Length: 38:41
- Label: Head Heritage
- Producer: Julian Cope

Julian Cope chronology
Revolutionary Suicide (2013)	Drunken Songs (2017)	Rite At Ya (2017)

Professional ratings
Review scores
Source	Rating
AllMusic	4/5 stars
Mojo	4/5 stars
The Spill Magazine	4/5 stars
Backseat Mafia	8/10 stars

Drunken Songs is the thirtieth solo album by Julian Cope, released in February 2017.

The album is a collection of drinking songs that celebrate alcohol and the virtues of being drunk. It was written, produced and performed entirely by Cope, with the only outside contribution being additional vocals on "Clonakilty as Charged" by Christopher Holman of Cope side project Dope.

== Background ==
In 1983, Cope gave up drinking for 20 years. While doing book research in Armenia in 2003 he was invited to a celebration in a village and was expected to drink. "So I had nine mulberry vodkas that night and afterwards I was like a boy racer. Bring it on. From there, I just started bringing together tales from various experiences from the UK and weaved them into ridiculous songs."

== Themes and musical style ==
In his review for Mojo magazine, Andrew Perry wrote that the album sees Cope "celebrating beer as an expression of Anglo-Saxon primitivism (say no to Southern European wine!), via a half-dozen thigh-slappin’ ditties which hark back, ironically, to the humoristic ‘acid-campfire’ songcraft" of Cope's 1989 album Skellington. Cope said of album opener "Drink Me Under the Table": "It’s about living in the moment, that we take risks and we fuck up. And that’s what Drunken Songs is about." The song features Cope's signature Mellotron orchestrations and "recalls some of the grandeur of mid-90s albums like 20 Mothers and Interpreter", according to AllMusic's Timothy Monger. The acoustic "Liver Big as Hartlepool" is an answer song to Pete Wylie's "Heart as Big as Liverpool". According to Andrew Perry, the song takes "an amusingly oddball strum through memories of post-punk Liverpool". "As the Beer Flows Over Me" was the catalyst for the album. Described by Cope as a "twisted funeral drinking song", it celebrates northern latitudes and "beseeches listeners to diss the southern lands of the grape in favour of beer". The song first appeared on the 2013 album Psychedelic Revolution but is rerecorded here. "Clonakilty as Charged" was described as "loony accordion-led pub balladry" by Timothy Monger, while Backseat Mafia's Briandroid called it "whimsical folk-song surreal-ness". Musically, "Don't Drink & Drive (You Might Spill Some)" revisits Autogeddon territory, but "the sozzled version", according to Backseat Mafia. "On the Road to Tralee" effectively acts as Drunken Songs entire "side two". Aaron Badgley of The Spill Magazine described the song as "an 18-minute ‘magical mystery tour’ of Ireland through an alcoholic gaze". AllMusic called it "a conversationally sung, acoustic recounting of a drunken bus ride through southwest Ireland" and "equal parts narrative, field recording, and miniature prog epic".

== Critical reception ==
In his review for AllMusic, Timothy Monger wrote of the album: "With whiffs of Skellington, Autogeddon, and even early World Shut Your Mouth-era Cope, Drunken Songs is still its own unique animal and reveals our hero to be in fine creative fettle, still challenging himself and listeners even after 30 albums". Aaron Badgley of The Spill Magazine called it one of Cope's "best albums in his career" and added, "He sings of Liverpool and traces his Irish ancestry by, at times, using alcohol as a metaphor. By exploring his past, he has produced a very English album". Backseat Mafia magazine wrote that the album sees Cope returning to his "accessible and fertile 80s/90s period", noting that "With this album it’s clear that Mr Cope is enjoying himself again".

== Track listing ==
All tracks are written by Julian Cope

Programme 1
No.	Title	Length
1.	"Drink Me Under the Table"	3:20
2.	"Liver Big as Hartlepool"	4:50
3.	"As the Beer Flows Over Me"	3:19
4.	"Clonakilty as Charged"	5:29
5.	"Don't Drink & Drive (You Might Spill Some)"	2:55

Programme 2
No.	Title	Length
6.	"On the Road to Tralee"	18:48

== Personnel ==
- Julian Cope – vocals, instruments, production, front cover drawing
- Christopher Holman – vocals on "Clonakilty as Charged"
- Philippe Legènde – recording
- Avalon Cope – design
- Albany Cope – illustrations
