= Krautrocksampler =

1995 book by Julian Cope

- Author: Julian Cope
- Language: English
- Subject: Krautrock
- Publisher: Head Heritage
- Publication date: January 1, 1995
- Publication place: United Kingdom
- Media type: Paperback
- Pages: 140 pp
- ISBN: 0-9526719-1-3
- OCLC: 44822513

Krautrocksampler: One Head's Guide to the Great Kosmische Musik – 1968 Onwards, written by the musician and writer Julian Cope, is a book describing the underground music scene in Germany from 1968 through the 1970s. The book was first published in the United Kingdom in 1995 by Head Heritage, and was later translated into German, Italian and French. The book gives a subjective and very animated account of the phenomenon of krautrock from the perspective of the author, who states: "I wrote this short history because of the way I feel about the music, that its supreme Magic & Power has lain Unrecognised for too long."

The book comprises a narrative of the rock and roll culture in post-WWII West Germany, along with chapters focusing on individual major artists, including Faust, Tangerine Dream, Neu!, Amon Düül I and II, Ash Ra Tempel, Rolf-Ulrich Kaiser and the Cosmic Jokers and advocate of psychedelic drugs Timothy Leary. It also has an annotated appendix of "50 Kosmische Classics." Some chapters appeared previously in the UK music magazine The Wire and in the German music magazine Spex.

Simon Reynolds has referred to Krautrocksampler as "[p]assionate, pithy, and portable [...] His ultra-vivid and hilariously over-the-top descriptions of a legion of German post-psychedelic records suggested that this prolific musician [...] might have missed his true vocation as a Lester Bangs-style advocate."

It has been long out of print, with original copies changing hands for surprisingly large amounts of money. Despite this continued demand for Krautrocksampler, Cope has stated that the book will not be updated or reprinted, claiming that it contains some "factual errors and that he doesn't want to position himself as an expert, having met people he considers better informed."

The cover is a detail from the cover of Amon Düül II's album Yeti.

== See also ==
- Japrocksampler, Cope's book on Japanese rock music.
