= Dark Orgasm =

Studio album by Julian Cope
- Released: November 2005
- Genre: Rock, hard rock
- Length: 48:40
- Label: Head Heritage
- Producer: Julian Cope

Julian Cope chronology
Citizen Cain'd (2005)	Dark Orgasm (2005)	You Gotta Problem With Me (2007)

Professional ratings
Review scores
Source	Rating
AllMusic	2/5 stars
The Guardian	3/5 stars
The Great Rock Discography	4/10

Dark Orgasm is the twenty-first solo album by Julian Cope, released in 2005. It contains eight songs of guitar-heavy hard rock split into two short CDs. Alexis Petridis of The Guardian described the album as "a roughly recorded Stooges-meets-prog concept album about atheism and feminism". It was dedicated to "Freedom and Equality for Women".

== Track listing ==
All songs and poems written by Julian Cope

Disc one

1. "Zoroaster" – 4:05
2. "White Bitch Comes Good" – 3:46
3. "She's Got a Ring on Her Finger (& Another Through Her Nose)" – 4:01
4. "Mr. Invasion" – 3:19
5. "Nothing to Lose Except My Mind" – 3:47
6. "I've Found a New Way to Love Her" – 3:59
7. "I Don't Wanna Grow Back" – 4:10

Disc two

1. "The Death & Resurrection Show" – 20:58
2. (untitled) – 0:35

Poetry (printed in booklet)

1. "Who Makes the Festival Under the Hill?"
2. "Creedist Blues"
3. "No Second Opinion"

Note

- Track 2 on disc two is the first 35 seconds of "The Death & Resurrection Show".

== Personnel ==
Credits adapted from the album's liner notes.

Musicians

- Julian Cope — vocals, guitar, bass, mellotron, arrangement
- Anthony "Doggen" Foster (credited as Døgntank) — lead guitar, bass guitar, arrangement
- Ian "Mister E." Bissett – drums, arrangement

Technical

- Julian Cope – producer, directed by, mixing engineer
- Terry Dobbin — recorded by
- Adam "Randy Apostle" Whittaker – recorded by, mixing engineer, mastering engineer
- Benji Bartlett – photography
- Christopher Patrick "Holy" McGrail — design
