= Julian Cope =

British musician & author (born 1957)

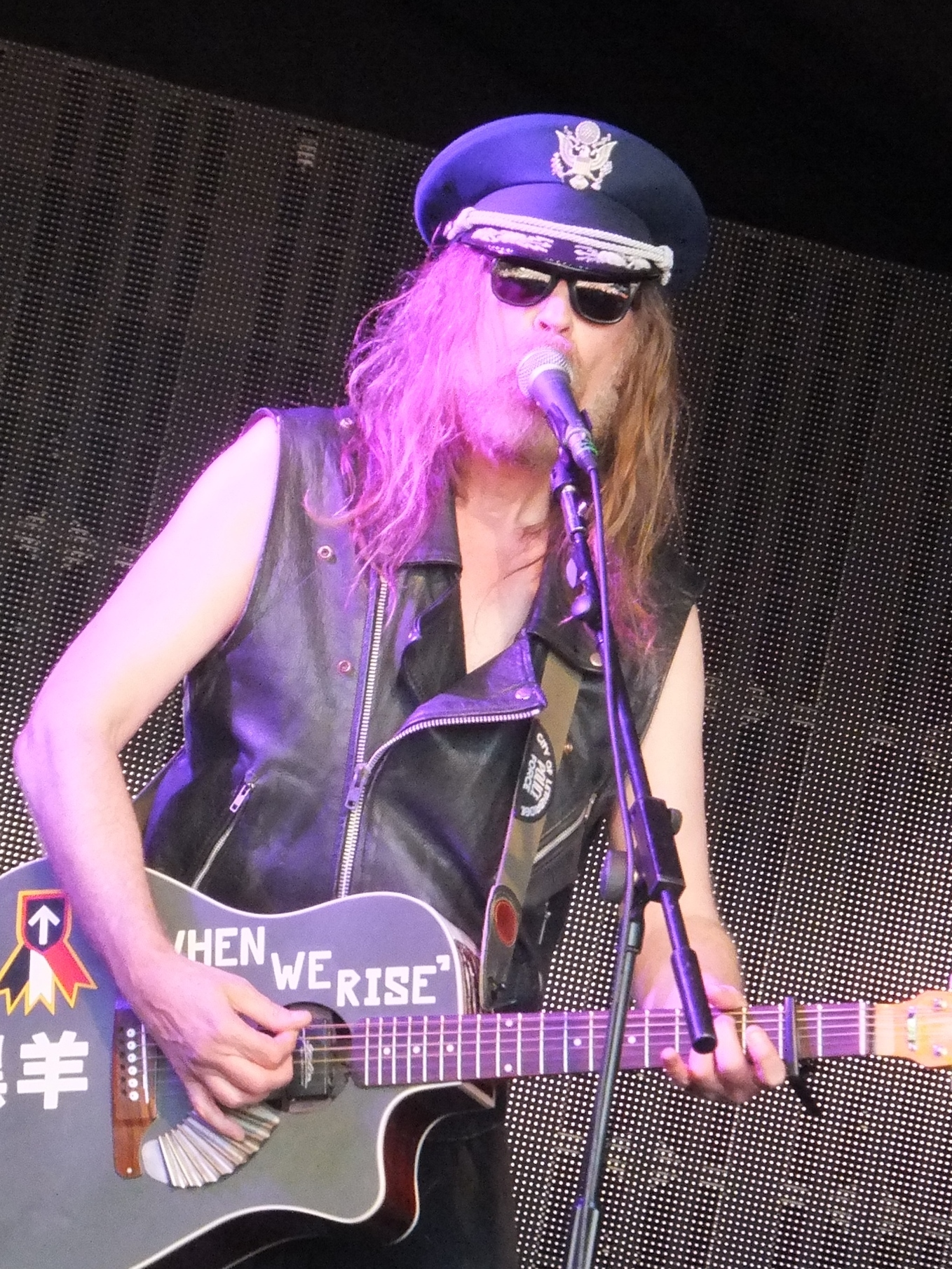
- Cope performing in 2015

Background information
- Born: Julian David Cope; 21 October 1957 (age 69); Deri, Glamorgan, Wales
- Genre: Rock
- Occupations: Singer-songwriter; musician; author; antiquarian
- Instruments: Vocals; guitar; bass; keyboards
- Years active: 1978–present
- Labels: Def American; Echo; Island; Mercury; Zoo; Head Heritage
- Member of: Queen Elizabeth; Black Sheep
- Formerly of: The Teardrop Explodes; Crucial Three; Brain Donor
- Website: headheritage.co.uk
- Writing career
- Period: 1982–present
- Subjects: Musicology; sociology; poetry

Julian David Cope (born 21 October 1957) is an English musician and author. He was the singer and songwriter in Liverpool post-punk band the Teardrop Explodes and has followed a solo career since 1983 in addition to working on musical side projects such as Queen Elizabeth, Brain Donor, and Black Sheep.

Cope is an author on Neolithic culture, publishing The Modern Antiquarian in 1998, and a political and cultural activist with a public interest in occultism and paganism. He has written two volumes of autobiography, Head-On (1994) and Repossessed (1999); two volumes of archaeology, The Modern Antiquarian (1998) and The Megalithic European (2004); and three volumes of musicology, Krautrocksampler (1995), Japrocksampler (2007); and Copendium: A Guide to the Musical Underground (2012).

== Early life and career ==
Cope was born in Deri, Glamorgan, Wales, where his mother's parents lived, while she was staying there. His family resided in Tamworth, Staffordshire. Cope was staying with his grandmother near Aberfan on his ninth birthday, the day of the Aberfan disaster of 1966, which he has described as a key event of his childhood.

Cope grew up in Tamworth with his parents and his younger brother Joss. He played Oliver in Wilnecote High School's production of the musical. He attended C.F. Mott College of Education (now Liverpool John Moores University), and it was here that he first became involved in music.

=== 1976–77: Early bands ===
In July 1977, Cope was one of the founders of the Crucial Three, a Liverpool punk rock band in which he played bass guitar. Although the Crucial Three lasted for little more than six weeks and disbanded without playing in public, all three members went on to lead successful Liverpool post-punk bands—singer Ian McCulloch with Echo & the Bunnymen and guitarist Pete Wylie with the Mighty Wah! Post-Crucial Three, Cope and McCulloch initially continued together in forming two other short-lived bands, UH? and A Shallow Madness (Cope had also spent time with Wylie in another short-lived band, Nova Mob). When Cope sacked McCulloch from A Shallow Madness, McCulloch went on to form Echo & the Bunnymen. The two former bandmates maintained a frequently antagonistic rivalry from then on, often carried out in public or in the press.

In late 1977, Cope joined the punk band the Mystery Girls with Pete Wylie, Pete Burns (later of Dead or Alive) and Phil Hurst. They had one performance (opening for Sham 69 at Eric's Club in Liverpool in November 1977) before disbanding.

=== 1978–1983: The Teardrop Explodes ===
In 1978, Cope formed the Teardrop Explodes with drummer Gary Dwyer, organist Paul Simpson and guitarist Mick Finkler, with himself as singer, bass player and principal songwriter. Drawing on a post-punk version of West Coast pop music (which gained the nickname of "bubblegum trance"), the band became part of a wave of neo-psychedelic Liverpool bands. Cope and Dwyer (and later their manager-turned-keyboard player David Balfe, who served both as Cope's creative foil and his personal antagonist) were the only band constants; seven other members passed in and out of the line-up during the band's fractious four-year existence. Several well-received early singles (including "Sleeping Gas" and "Treason") culminated in the band's biggest hit, "Reward", which hit number 6 on the UK singles chart and took the Kilimanjaro album to number 24 on the chart. Cope's photogenic charm and wild, garrulous interview style helped keep the band in the media eye, and made him a short-lived teen idol during the band's peak.

Success brought the Teardrop Explodes attention, but no further stability. Their second album Wilder experimented with different and darker psychedelic styles, as well as delving deeper into Cope's complicated psyche: it spawned no major hits and sold relatively poorly at the time (despite being critically praised in retrospect). Excessive drug use plus continued infighting undermined the band, and a final lineup of Cope, Dwyer and Balfe split apart in 1982 after failed attempts to record a third album and a final disastrous tour.

Despite the relatively short life of the band, the Teardrop Explodes has continued to sustain interest and praise since its demise and the band's back catalogue of recordings has been reissued several times over the last 30 years. Cope, however, has strenuously resisted taking advantage of any nostalgic and commercial opportunities to reunite the band.

=== 1982–85: The Mercury years – World Shut Your Mouth and Fried ===
In 1982 (accompanied by his new American wife Dorian Beslity), Cope moved to the Staffordshire village of Drayton Bassett (close to his childhood home of Tamworth). Following the break up of the Teardrop Explodes, he spent a period in seclusion recovering from the strain of the group's final year. Cope's well-documented Teardrops-era LSD excesses, eccentric behaviour and subsequent retreat had led to him being labelled an "acid casualty" in the vein of Syd Barrett and Roky Erickson, an image which took him several years to shake off. During this period Cope befriended a teenage Drayton Bassett musician, Donald Ross Skinner, who became his main musical foil for the next twelve years.

"It has always been the bane of my existence that my passport says 'musician' and not 'artist'."

— Julian Cope

In 1983, Cope began recording the songs for his first solo album, World Shut Your Mouth. Although the album generally retained the uptempo pop drive of the Teardrops, it was also an introspective and surreal work with many references to childhood. Former Teardrops drummer Gary Dwyer, guitarist Steve Lovell and The Dream Academy oboist Kate St John all contributed to the album, which was released on Mercury Records in March 1984. World Shut Your Mouth was seen as out-of-step with the times, gained poor reviews and sold indifferently. A single from the album, "Sunshine Playroom", featured a disturbing video directed by David Bailey. During a concert at Hammersmith Palais on the subsequent promotional tour, Cope slashed across his bare stomach with a broken microphone stand in an act of frustrated self-mutilation. Although the wounds were superficial, it shocked the audience and resulted in another memorable addition to his reputation for bizarre behaviour.

World Shut Your Mouth was followed six months later by 1984's Fried album for which Cope was joined by Skinner, Lovell, St John, ex-Waterboys drummer Chris Whitten and Wah! guitarist Steve "Brother Johnno" Johnson. The album was much more raw in approach than its predecessor, and although in many respects it prefigured the looser and more mystical style which Cope would follow and be praised for in the next decade, it sold poorly at the time (as did the accompanying single "Sunspots"). Notoriously, the sleeve featured a naked Cope crouched on top of the Alvecote Mound slag heap clad only in a large turtle shell. The album includes a song titled "Bill Drummond Said" about Cope's A&R man at WEA, to which future KLF star Drummond responded with a song titled "Julian Cope Is Dead", pondering how much more famous Cope might have been had he been assassinated at the height of his fame. The commercial failure of Fried led to Polygram dropping Cope, who subsequently engaged a new manager (Cally Callomon) and signed a deal with Island Records.

=== 1986–1992: The Island years ===
==== 1986–1990: Saint Julian and My Nation Underground (plus Skellington and Droolian) ====
With Cally's encouragement, Cope made the effort to clean up and compete. He formed a new backing group (informally known as the "Two-Car Garage Band") featuring Skinner, Whitten, former Teardrops associate James Eller on bass guitar, and himself on vocals, rhythm guitar and assorted keyboards (Cope performed the latter under the alias of "Double DeHarrison" until the band hired Richard Frost as full-time keyboard player). This band lineup recorded Cope's third solo album Saint Julian, mostly composed of crisp and memorable rock songs. It was trailed by the single "World Shut Your Mouth", which became Cope's biggest solo hit, reaching No. 19 in the UK in 1986 and becoming his only Top 20 solo hit. The parent album was well received and generated two more singles ("Trampolene" and "Eve's Volcano") but the fresh momentum did not last. Cope fell out with Callomon, and the Two-Car Garage band disintegrated as Eller joined The The and Whitten left for Paul McCartney's band.

Back in London, and with only the faithful Skinner remaining, Cope enlisted his A&R man Ron Fair as producer and recorded a follow-up album titled My Nation Underground. This featured a varied lineup of musicians including Fair, Skinner, Danny Thompson, eccentric percussionist Rooster Cosby (who was to remain a close Cope associate) and assorted sessions musicians (some of whom, such as James Eller, had contributed to the previous album). My Nation Underground produced only one Top 40 single, "Charlotte Anne", which also met with modest American success by reaching the top of the Modern Rock Tracks. Subsequent singles "5 O'Clock World" (a cover of a 1965 Vogues song) and the orchestral pop ballad "China Doll" both charted considerably lower, disappointing Island Records and further discouraging Cope, who had not enjoyed making the record and did not believe that it represented him properly as an artist.

To comfort himself, Cope spent a single illicit weekend at the end of the My Nation Underground sessions to create a second, lo-fi and unauthorised album titled Skellington. Recorded in the same studio used for My Nation Underground on Island's money (and predominantly featuring the same core team of Cope, Skinner, Cosby and Fair) it was seen by Cope as a far more genuine artistic statement recorded at a fraction of the money and time. Neither Island Records nor Cope's current management team had any desire to release Skellington and Cope refused to record any other material while he feuded with them to try to get his new work released. Eventually, Skellington was released on the tiny Zippo label later in 1989, showing the poor relations between Cope and Island.

In 1990, Cope followed up Skellington with a second lo-fi album, Droolian, likewise recorded over three days. It was released only in Texas (on another small label, Mofoco) and the profits were used to aid of one of Cope's heroes, the former 13th Floor Elevators frontman Roky Erickson, who at that time was in jail without legal representation.

==== 1991–92: Peggy Suicide and Jehovahkill ====
During this period, Cope discovered the book Guitar Army: Rock and Revolution with The MC5 and the White Panther Party by John Sinclair. He later described it as his "Holy Book" and enthusiastically embraced its one-take approach to making and recording music (as well as its message of rock- and-roll being a weapon of cultural revolution). This method typified Cope's musical approach from then on, as he forever left behind the more measured and constructed approach of Saint Julian and The Teardrop Explodes in favour of more spontaneous expression.

"Nothing I do is ironic. I am post-Ironic. Irony is the ultimate cop-out way of turning something you did not mean into something you did. Like bands that put big tits on their album sleeves and say it's an ironic comment about sexism. Like bands that put car shit on their album sleeves and say it's anti-car. Bollocks. If it glorifies then it's bollocks. Irony is the last refuge of the scoundrel."

— Julian Cope

Having repaired his relationship with Island Records, Cope began recording his next record against the background of the civil demonstrations which became the Poll Tax Riots. Cope joined the demonstrations and took a prominent role in them. Wearing a huge theatrical costume throughout the march, he was later featured on the BBC's Poll Tax documentary, a lone protester walking down Whitehall surrounded by seven lines of mounted police.

These (and other) elements fed into the double album Peggy Suicide, which was released on Island Records in 1991 and was heralded by critics as Cope's best work to date. On the album's songs, Cope laid bare many of his personal convictions including his hatred of organized religion and his increasing public interest in women's rights, the occult, alternative spirituality (including paganism and Goddess worship), animal rights, and ecology. Skinner, Rooster Cosby, Ron Fair and former Smiths drummer Mike Joyce all contributed to the record, as did a new sidekick in the shape of future Spiritualized lead guitarist Michael Watts (better known as Mike Mooney or "Moon-eye"). Although the album produced another well-received single ("Beautiful Love") the political content of Peggy Suicide caused more friction with Island, who had signed Cope as a marketable hit-making alternative rocker but increasingly found themselves dealing with a latter-day counter-culturalist and revolutionary. Cope toured the album, including several dates in Japan which were recorded (although the results were not released until 2004, on the live album Live Japan '91.)

In 1992, Cope released another double album. Jehovahkill, on Island Records. Musically, the album reflected his interest in Krautrock (though in a more electro-acoustic based form) and his teenage fascination for Detroit hard rock. (A deluxe edition, with a disc of extra material, was released fourteen years later in 2006). Lyrically, the album was fiercely anti-Christian, with such songs as "Poet is Priest", "Julian H. Cope", and the single "Fear Loves This Place" espousing Cope's Paganesque perspective and being highly critical of the established Church. The content (and lack of sales) proved to be too much for Island Records. Despite the album reaching the UK Top 20, the label dropped Cope in the same week that his three shows sold out at London's 1,800 capacity Town & Country Club. The music press mounted an outcry at Island's decision, with the New Musical Express (NME) featuring him on their front cover under the headline "Endangered Species" while Select magazine started a campaign to have Cope re-signed.

=== 1993–96: Rite, Autogeddon, 20 Mothers, Interpreter and the road to independence ===
From this point onwards, Cope began to take greater personal control of his career and business affairs. While he continued to sign contracts with established record labels, he would begin to release more esoteric projects independently. The first of these projects (issued on Cope's own K.A.K. label) was a collaboration with Donald Ross Skinner: an album of instrumental jams titled Rite, inspired by Krautrock, Sly Stone-styled psychedelic funk and spiritual mysticism. Cope also took the opportunity to issue The Skellington Chronicles (an expanded version of Skellington along with a follow-up album in the same vein: Skellington 2: He's Back ... and this time it's personal) and would record a number of tracks released eighteen years later as 2011's The Jehovahcoat Demos. During this period, Cope began his work as a writer, completing the first volume of his autobiography and beginning to research works on Krautrock and Neolithic architecture.

" Mine's a holistic trip. That's the difference. You could put me in a coracle and send me off to some rock somewhere to make art, but do that to any member of U2 and they wouldn't make art, you know, they'd find a way back to the mainland. It's like Joseph Campbell said, it's the difference between the celebrity and the hero. The celebrity will walk across tall buildings and dance on tightropes for his audience, but the hero will do exactly the same things and if the audience has all gone home, he'll still be doing it to please himself. And that's the thing, I have an incendiary in me, which is entirely at odds with pretty much 99.9% of the people on the Earth and if I can sustain that, then I'll change things entirely. You've just got to have faith that what you're saying is the cosmic truth."

— Julian Cope

Signing to the Def Jam subsidiary American Recordings for a one-off album deal, Cope recorded Autogeddon, which was released in 1994. Continuing to build on the musical approach of Peggy Suicide and Jehovahkill but with a greater element of space rock, the album used the automobile as its central metaphor for individual and collective struggles between responsibility and selfishness, along with further stabs at patriarchy. Autogeddon was the first Cope album to feature synthesizer player Thighpaulsandra, who would become another key Cope collaborator. In the same year, Cope and Thighpaulsandra would form the ambient-electronic project Queen Elizabeth: the eponymous Queen Elizabeth album was released on the Echo Label, which would be the home of Cope's main releases for the next two years.

Cope's next album under his own name was 1995's 20 Mothers which revisited many of his existing lyrical preoccupations but with a more sprawling and eclectic musical approach (including stronger elements of pop and folk) and more directly personal and reflective material dealing with Cope's own family. The album received very positive reviews and also spawned the Top 40 single "Try, Try, Try", which led to two Top of the Pops performances. The subsequent British live tour (featuring Cosby, Mooney, Thighpaulsandra, and keyboard-player-turned-bass-guitarist Richard Frost) was fraught with tension, and Mooney subsequently moved on to join Spiritualized. Cope had also parted company with his long-term foil Donald Ross Skinner during the recording of 20 Mothers, although the parting was relatively amicable.

Having been dropped by Echo when he refused to visit the US, Cope then signed to Cooking Vinyl and delivered the Interpreter album in 1996. This continued in a similar but more disciplined vein to its predecessor, with stronger elements of techno and humour (as exemplified in songs like "Cheap New Age Fix") among the more serious topics, such as those inspired by Cope's attendance at the Newbury Bypass protests.

=== 1997–present: Head Heritage ===
==== 1997–2006: Assorted solo and collaborative work; Citizen Cain'd, Rome Wasn't Burned in a Day, plus Brain Donor, L.A.M.F. and more Rite recordings ====
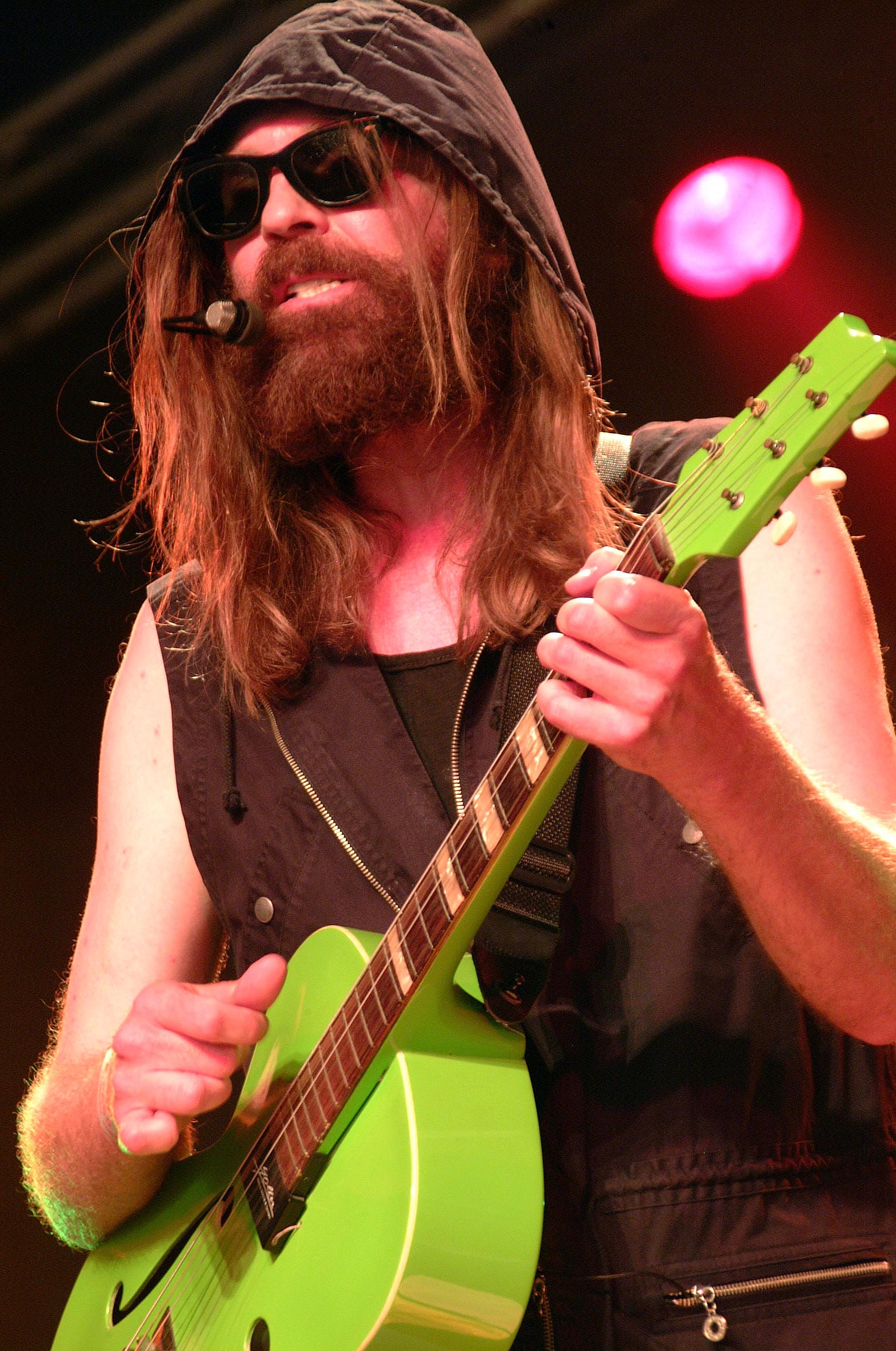
Cope in 2003

By this point, Cope's battle with music industry operatives (whom he referred to as "greedheads") would see him finally turn his back on the mainstream music industry. From 1997, he opted for full career independence, launching his Head Heritage organisation as combined record label, website and discussion forum.

"I'm going to become the best-remembered artist of my generation by staying away from the party as often as possible. That way, people will remember me, not because I was great, but because I didn't cause them any later embarrassment."

— Julian Cope

The first Head Heritage release was 1997's Rite 2, Cope's follow up to 1993's Rite (with Thighpaulsandra taking over from Donald Ross Skinner as creative foil). It was followed in the same year by the second Queen Elizabeth album, QE2: Elizabeth Vagina, which expanded on its predecessor's cosmic rock experiments. Thighpaulsandra would then follow Michael Mooney into Spiritualized (as would Cope's string arranger Martin Shellard), once more depriving Cope of a key collaborator. Cope's next full solo album was 1999's Odin, which consisted of a single 73-minute mantra for voices and electronics (although Thighpaulsandra has claimed credit for some of the work).

In 1999, Cope launched another side project. This was the garage-rock/heavy metal power trio Brain Donor, which featured Cope on bass, Anthony "Doggen" Foster on guitar and Spiritualized's Kevin "Kevlar" Bales on drums. The band was as much theatrical as musical, featuring full face makeup, platform boots and ostentatious double-neck guitars. Cope stated that the band's aim was to fuse the swaggering arena rock of KISS and Van Halen with elements of Japanese heavy metal, Detroit garage rock and Blue Cheer. He also described Brain Donor as "pure white lightning played by forward-thinking motherfuckers" while also asserting that he loathed the "microcephalous ass (of) real heavy metal", seeing Brain Donor as part of his ongoing shamanic efforts.

In 2000, Cope released another solo album – An Audience with the Cope. While appearing to be pitched as a retrospective live recording, it consisted of a series of newly written psychedelic studio jams.

Since 1998, Cope had developed a parallel reputation as a serious antiquarian. This resulted in his 2001 album Discover Odin being a limited-edition tie-in with a talk he had given at the British Museum, featuring a mixture of spoken-word tracks exploring Nordic mythology and various musical tracks including a Cope setting of the epic Norse poem "Hávamál". In the same year Head Heritage released the first two Brain Donor singles, "She Saw Me Coming" and "Get Off Your Pretty Face", followed by the début Brain Donor album Love Peace & Fuck. Cope, Doggen and a returning Thighpaulsandra also teamed up as the drummer-less psychedelic/meditational heavy metal group L.A.M.F. who released the Ambient Metal album the same year. Brain Donor's "Get Back on It" single followed in 2002, as did the third album in Cope's Rite series, Rite Now.

In 2003, Cope performed at the Glastonbury Festival as well as launching his own three-day Rome Wasn't Burned in a Day event. A tie-in album, also titled Rome Wasn't Burned in a Day, was released to mark the event and included an "eight-minute long Armenian epic" called "Shrine of the Black Youth (Tukh Manukh)". The album was recorded by a trio of Cope, synth player Christopher Patrick "Holy" McGrail and Donald Ross Skinner (returning to work with Cope after a seven year absence). The year also saw more Brain Donor activity via the "My Pagan Ass" single and the album Too Freud To Rock'n'Roll, Too Jung To Die and an appearance on Sunn O)))'s collaborative album White1 with Cope reciting occultic druid poetry on the opening track, "My Wall".

Cope released two more albums in 2005. The first of these was the long-delayed Citizen Cain'd, an album which Cope had promised for several years and now delivered as a short double album (71 minutes over two discs) sold at a single album price. (According to Cope, the two-disc format was due to some of the songs being "too psychologically exhausting" to fit together onto a single album). The second album, Dark Orgasm, was a forthright hard-rock exercise which Cope described as "a violent sequence of outcast broadsides leveled at the coming new 21st-century conservatism". Meanwhile, Brain Donor (proving to be an enduring Cope project) was presented to America via a self-titled compilation album. Plans to tour the United States were dropped because the INS refused to grant Cope a visa.

2006 saw the release of the third proper Brain Donor album (Drain'd Boner) and the fourth album in the Rite series (Rite Bastard).

==== 2007–2015: You Gotta Problem With Me, Black Sheep, Psychedelic Revolution, Revolutionary Suicide and beyond ====
Cope's 2007 album, You Gotta Problem With Me, was something of a return to his early solo material: more post-punk styled, and featuring swathes of Mellotron and orchestral percussion. Conceptually, it continued his attacks on religion, bigotry, corporate greed and environmental destruction. As with Citizen Cain'd, Cope divided the fifty-six minutes of material across two CDs and also included lavish packaging including printed poems.

You Gotta Problem With Me was followed by 2008's Black Sheep, which Cope described as "a musical exploration of what it is to be an outsider in modern Western Culture" and which featured his most outrightly anarchic pronouncements to date. Dominated by Mellotron, hand drums and acoustic guitars, the album also featured Doggen and McGrail plus new recruits Michael O'Sullivan and Ady "Acoustika" Fletcher. In November 2008, Cope released the Preaching Revolution EP, mingling acoustic protest songs with rockabilly pieces. These songs would be reissued on the limited-edition Cope solo album, The Unruly Imagination (along with material from the unreleased Diggers, Ranters, Levellers EP).

Cope, McGrail, O'Sullivan, and Acoustika went on to form a new ten-piece Cope side project (also called Black Sheep) which included new cohorts such as drummer Antony "Antronhy" Hodgkinson, "Fat Paul" Horlick and former Universal Panzies leader Christophe F. To date, Black Sheep has generated two further albums, both released in 2009 – Kiss My Sweet Apocalypse and Black Sheep at the BBC. 2009 also saw the release of a fourth Brain Donor album (Wasted Fuzz Excessive) and a live Queen Elizabeth album Hall, originally recorded in 2000.

In 2011, Cope released the mostly-instrumental The Jehovahcoat Demos, containing fifteen previously unreleased tracks written and recorded by Cope throughout 1993 in direct response to having been dropped by Island Records in October 1992. Two further Cope solo recordings followed in 2012. Psychedelic Revolution was a song collection described as "eleven epic examples of the Archdrude’s most scrupulously-written balladry... tales of insurrection, tales of building new cultural traditions and tales of sexism, racism and even species-ism." The album featured two "phases", each dedicated to a different revolutionary (Che Guevara or Leila Khaled). Woden was an "ambulant meditation" album featuring a single long-form track which Cope referred to as "one enormous meteorological cloud of music originally conceived as a vast and atmospheric seventy-two-minute-long follow-up to [the] Ur-vocal masterpiece Odin". Performed on VCS3 synthesizer and Mellotron, the album also featured field recordings taken from the Neolithic landscape around Cope's Avebury and Silbury home neighbourhood, plus a recording of bellringers from Yatesbury.

In 2013, Cope released the Revolutionary Suicide album. As well as returning to the revolutionary pagan folk which he'd explored during the previous decade with Black Sheep, the album referenced or cited American revolutionary voices such as those of Huey Newton and Hunter S. Thompson. It also extended Cope's attacks on religion to include jabs at contemporary Islam, and explored other new Cope preoccupations including the Armenian Genocide and Terence McKenna's "stoned ape" theory of psychedelic substances directly influencing human evolution. Two years later, the 2015 release Trip Advizer – The Very Best of Julian Cope 1999–2014 compiled sixteen tracks from the first fifteen years of Head Heritage releases, while the companion Trip Advizer EP provided three non-album tracks from the Head Heritage archives, one of them a re-recorded "Psychedelic Evolution".

==== 2017-present: Drunken Songs, Skellington 3, Self Civil War, England Expectorates, the Robin Hood albums, the Dope project and others ====
Cope's next album was 2017's Drunken Songs, a collection of newly-written drinking songs written to celebrate and explore alcohol, drunkenness and liberation. Inspired by Cope's return to drinking after two decades of abstinence from alcohol, the album also explored Ireland (and aspects of Cope's own Irish heritage) through an alcoholic lens, referenced Cope's Liverpudlian connections and reinforced his preference of Northern European culture (represented by beer) over Southern Europe (wine). The next two albums revisited familiar Cope stylings - 2017's Rite at Ya revived the Rite drones for a fifth time, while 2018's Skellington 3 was the third in Cope's intermittent series of "acid campfire songs" (consisting of twelve "orphan" songs that he'd spontaneously recorded on his phone over the years but never released).

In between these albums, Cope began to release recordings by yet another project: the "symphonic No Wave" band Dope, which he also described as being a "dark groove-based thing, monotonous mainly, and highly drug-informed." Founded in 2015, the project also included Holy McGrail and "Fat Paul" Horlick of Black Sheep plus newer cohorts Christopher Holman and Philippe Legènde (both of whom had contributed to Rite at Ya and Drunken Songs). No fewer than five Dope albums appeared during 2017 and 2018 - Dope feat. Julian Cope, Guerilla Grow, Dope on Drugs, Village Idiot Dope and Seven Disquieting Dirges (attributed to "Dope feat. Fuck Authority" - the latter being an alias for Bristolian engineer/electronic musician Gareth Turner - and as being "performed by sub bass madmen and throwback f.x. contrarians"). The 2019 album John Balance Enters Valhalla (a mostly instrumental pagan tribute to the late John Balance of Coil) began as a Dope project, but was eventually released under Cope's name. Two further Dope albums followed - 2019's Black Math and 2020's Semi-Legal on the Edge of Culture - the latter presented as a "lost" release of the very earliest project recordings.

Cope then entered another phase of song-based solo releases, beginning with 2020's Self Civil War, the first release in an intended series called "Our Troubled Times" and one which provided a by-now rare Cope single (the latter's title, "Cunts Can Fuck Off", showing that he'd lost none of his counter-cultural stubbornness). 2020 also saw the release of the first Teardrop Explodes album for a long time: Cold War Psychedelia was a compilation of 1982 Teardrop Explodes instrumental demos, eight of them overlaid with Cope's early vocal drafts for the text of his 1989 autobiography Head-On.

The next album, 2022's England Expectorates, was summarised by Cope as "thirteen feel-good songs for feel-bad times" or "thirteen keenly constructed missives to help get us through this ropey fucking situation." Featuring Cope's familiar mixture of garage rock, "mantric powerdrive" and Mellotron psychedelia, it was in part a scornful valedictory to Boris Johnson's time as Prime Minister (and its long-term impact), and was also promoted as being the work of "the Archdrude at his most succinct, tripped-out, punky, blasted and beautiful." A similar approach was applied to British legend and British contemporary life on Cope's next two records, the loosely-paired Robin Hood (2023) and Friar Tuck (2024). Both featured a tweaking of folklore (relocating the Robin Hood stories to Tamworth and Wiltshire and thereby merging them with Cope's own history) combined with Cope's familiar in-jokes, pagan and musical references and rebellious stances.

2024 also saw the revival of Cope's Queen Elizabeth project with The Corpse of Queen Elizabeth (released in line with the death of Queen Elizabeth II) and the release of another item from the Cope archives; Avila in Albicella, a sleep-aid piece Cope had produced for his young daughters in 1999 and now described as "a chorale of Mellotronics from the 1990s sleep chamber". The Corpse of Queen Elizabeth was soon re-released as part of a further slew of Cope-related releases in late 2025, collectively described as "Head Heritage’s 2025 Ambient Autumn". The other releases in this set were another Queen Elizabeth album called Now That I'm Different (covering the full fifteen active years of the project between 1990 and 2005, and featuring contributions from SunnO)))'s Stephen O'Malley), a reissue of L.A.M.F.'s Ambient Metal, and two Julian Cope albums - I Dream the Cosmos Atavistic (described as "next-world ambient music that challenges time itself") and E-Man Groovin' (a piece building on recovered recordings of a lengthy celebratory jam from the end of the Peggy Suicide sessions). 2025 also saw the twentieth anniversary reissue of Citizen Cain'd; released in parallel, Cope provided the compilation album On the Road to Citizen Cain'd, pulling together various songs originally intended for Citizen Cain'd but redirected to other projects.

== Writing ==
=== Music commentary ===
Cope has long been an avid champion of obscure and underground music. While still a member of the Teardrop Explodes, he was instrumental in the critical rehabilitation of the reclusive singer Scott Walker, compiling Fire Escape in the Sky: The Godlike Genius of Scott Walker for release by Bill Drummond's Zoo Records. This sparked renewed interest in the work of Walker (although years later Cope commented that the singer's "Pale White Intellectual" outlook on life no longer held any fascination for him).

Cope established himself as a musicologist with his books Krautrocksampler, Japrocksampler and Copendium. Released in 1996, Krautrocksampler covers the German bands of the 1970s dubbed "krautrock" by the British music press. A Rolling Stone review praised the book as "a work of real passion and scholarship". NME agreed: "This is a superb book ... this is an extraordinary book." Mojo went further, writing: "Brilliantly researched, Krautrocksampler abounds with revelations, and Cope's enthusiasm verges on the lethal ... a sort of lysergic Lester Bangs." In the Sunday Times, the reviewer wrote: "German 1970s minimalism is invading the British rock scene ... an Englishman is to blame ... Krautrocksampler is a lively history of a fascinating period, half encyclopedia, half psychedelic detective story."

Cope's writing has also won respect in academic circles. His second work as a musicologist, Japrocksampler – subtitled How the post war Japanese blew their minds on rock and roll – was published by HarperCollins in October 2007.

"When we were putting the website together, I said to my web guy, 'I want to have an Album of the Month'. He said, 'you say that now, but will you still want to do it in six months?'. But I've been doing it since May 2000 and I've never missed a month. I did one at the foot of Mount Ararat; I did another at the hotel in Pompeii. The last place I wanted to be was in the hotel writing, but it's what I decided to do. To be a practitioner was everything."

— Julian Cope, 2008

His Album of the Month reviews on the Unsung section of his website (collected and published in 2012 as Copendium) have promoted bands such as Comets on Fire, Sunn O))) (with whom he performed a guest vocal on their White1 album) and several Japanese bands which feature in Japrocksampler. Cope is also considered to be one of the first bloggers; he has been airing his sometimes controversial views since 1997 via his website's "Address Drudion" on the first day of each month, he stopped these in 2014.

=== Archaeology and antiquarianism ===
1998 saw the release of Cope's bestseller The Modern Antiquarian, a book detailing stone circles and other ancient monuments of prehistoric Britain, which sold out of its first edition of 20,000 in its first month of publication and was accompanied by a BBC Two documentary. The Times called the book: "A ripping good read ... it is deeply impressive ... ancient history: the new rock 'n' roll." The Independent said: "A unique blend of information, observation, personal experience and opinion which is as unlike the normal run of archaeology books as you can imagine." The historian Ronald Hutton went further, calling the book: "the best popular guide to Neolithic and Bronze Age monuments for half a century."

The Modern Antiquarian was followed in 2004 with another book on similar monuments across Europe entitled The Megalithic European. In addition to his books on prehistoric monuments, Cope hosts a community-based Modern Antiquarian website that invites contributors to add their own knowledge of the ancient sites of Britain and Ireland. Cope has lectured on the subject of prehistory, and also at the British Museum on the subjects of Avebury and Odin, where Cope appeared in five-inch platform boots and his hairspray set off fire alarms, causing the building to be evacuated.

=== Fiction ===
On 19 June 2014, Cope's first novel One Three One, subtitled "A Time-Shifting Gnostic Hooligan Road Novel", was published by Faber & Faber. Named for a Sardinian motorway, One Three One was well reviewed by The Guardian who wrote that "the musician's fiction debut is brilliant, serious, funny – and completely bonkers". Comedian Stewart Lee interviewed Cope for The Quietus and admits that "there were whole swathes of One Three One where I couldn't tell what was going on (or) which time stream we were in...but I didn't care".

Cope writes about many fictional bands and musicians in the book and has recorded music in the guise of these characters, some of which he has released under the same fictional pseudonyms. Other musical artists have collaborated with Cope for these releases, also under the book's fictional names, including Stephen O'Malley and Holy McGrail (as drone group Vesuvio) and with Robert Courtney and Donald Ross Skinner (as ravers Dayglo Maradona), amongst others. These releases were released via various imprints of Cope's Head Heritage label.

== Personal life ==
Cope is married to Dorian (née Beslity) with whom he has two daughters.

== Discography ==
Julian Cope discography
- Studio albums: 39
- Live albums: 2
- Compilation albums: 18
- Singles: 24

=== Studio albums ===
Year	Title	Chart positions					Certifications (sales thresholds)
Year	Title	UK	SWE	NZ	AUS	US	Certifications (sales thresholds)
1984	World Shut Your Mouth: Labels: Vertigo, Mercury, Phonogram (reissued with a second disc of extra material in 2015)	40	–	–	–	–	
1984	Fried: Labels: Mercury, PolyGram (reissued with a second disc of extra material in 2015)	87	–	–	–	–	
1987	Saint Julian: Labels: Island Records (reissued with a second disc of extra material in 2013)	11	39	25	90	105	UK: Silver
1988	My Nation Underground: Labels: Island	42	–	–	120	155	
1989	Skellington: Labels: CopeCo, Zippo Records	–	–	–	–	–	
1990	Droolian: Labels: MoFoCo, Zippo	–	–	–	–	–	
1991	Peggy Suicide: Labels: Island (reissued with a second disc of extra material in 2009)	23	–	–	134	–	
1992	Jehovahkill: Labels: Island (reissued with a second disc of extra material in 2006)	20	–	–	–	–	
1993	Rite (credited to Julian Cope and Donald Ross Skinner): Labels: Ma-Gog Records	–	–	–	–	–	
1993	The Skellington Chronicles: Labels: Ma-Gog Records, Head Heritage (reissued as Ye Skellington Chronicles in 1999)	–	–	–	–	–	
1994	Autogeddon: Labels: Echo, American Recordings	16	–	–	148	–	
1995	20 Mothers: Labels: Echo, American Recordings	20	–	–	178	–	
1996	Interpreter: Labels: Echo	39	–	–	–	–	
1997	Rite 2: Labels: Head Heritage	–	–	–	–	–	
1999	Odin: Labels: Head Heritage	–	–	–	–	–	
2000	An Audience With the Cope 2000/2001: Labels: Head Heritage	–	–	–	–	–	
2001	Discover Odin: Labels: Head Heritage	–	–	–	–	–	
2002	Rite Now: Labels: Head Heritage	–	–	–	–	–	
2003	Rome Wasn't Burned in a Day: Labels: Head Heritage	–	–	–	–	–	
2005	Citizen Cain'd: Labels: Head Heritage	–	–	–	–	–	
2005	Dark Orgasm: Labels: Head Heritage	–	–	–	–	–	
2006	Rite Bastard: Labels: Fuck Off & Di	–	–	–	–	–	
2007	You Gotta Problem With Me: Labels: Head Heritage, Invada	–	–	–	–	–	
2008	Black Sheep: Labels: Head Heritage	–	–	–	–	–	
2009	The Unruly Imagination: Labels: Head Heritage	–	–	–	–	–	
2011	The Jehovahcoat Demos: Labels: Head Heritage	–	–	–	–	–	
2012	Psychedelic Revolution: Labels: Head Heritage	–	–	–	–	–	
2012	Woden: Labels: Head Heritage	–	–	–	–	–	
2013	Revolutionary Suicide: Labels: Head Heritage	–	–	–	–	–	
2017	Drunken Songs: Labels: Head Heritage	–	–	–	–	–	
2017	Rite At Ya: Labels: Head Heritage	–	–	–	–	–	
2018	Skellington 3: Labels: Head Heritage	–	–	–	–	–	
2019	John Balance Enters Valhalla: Labels: Head Heritage	–	–	–	–	–	
2020	Self Civil War: Labels: Head Heritage	–	–	–	–	–	
2022	England Expectorates: Labels: Head Heritage	–	–	–	–	–	
2023	Robin Hood: Labels: Head Heritage	–	–	–	–	–	
2024	Avila in Albicella: Labels: Head Heritage	–	–	–	–	–	
2024	Friar Tuck: Labels: Head Heritage	–	–	–	–	–	
2025	On The Road To Citizen Cain'd: Labels: Head Heritage	–	–	–	–	–	

=== Live albums ===
- 2004 Live Japan '91
- 2019 Barrowlands - live in Glasgow 1995

=== Compilation albums ===
- 1992 Floored Genius – The Best of Julian Cope and the Teardrop Explodes 1979–91 (UK No. 22)
- 1993 Floored Genius 2 – Best of the BBC Sessions 1983–91
- 1997 The Followers of Saint Julian (rarities compilation)
- 1997 Leper Skin – An Introduction To Julian Cope ("best of")
- 2000 Floored Genius 3 – Julian Cope's Oddicon of Lost Rarities & Versions 1978–98 (rarities)
- 2002 The Collection (1983–1992)
- 2007 Christ vs Warhol (rarities)
- 2009 Floored Genius 4 – The Best of Foreign Radio, Rare TV Appearances, Festival Songs & Miscellaneous Lost Classics 1983–2009
- 2015 Trip Advizer – The Very Best of Julian Cope 1999–2014
- 2019 Cope's Notes #1: The Teardrop Explodes (1978–1982)
- 2021 Cold War Psychedelia (1982 demos / 1989 music for Head-On)
- 2021 Cope's Notes #2: Droolian
- 2022 Cope's Notes #3: World Shut Your Mouth
- 2023 Cope's Notes #4: Black Sheep
- 2024 Cope's Notes #5: The Modern Antiquarian
- 2024 Cope's Notes #6: Jehovahkill
- 2025 Cope's Notes #7: Citizen Cain'd
- 2026 Cope's Notes #8: Peggy Suicide

=== Singles ===
Year	Title	Chart positions							Album
Year	Title	UK	CAN	IRL	NZ	AUS	US	US MR	Album
1983	Sunshine Playroom EP	64	–	–	–	–	–	–	World Shut Your Mouth
1984	"The Greatness and Perfection of Love"	52	–	–	–	–	–	–	World Shut Your Mouth
1985	Sunspots EP	76	–	–	–	–	–	–	Fried
1985	"Competition" (released under the pseudonym Rabbi Joseph Gordon)	–^{[A]}	–	–	–	–	–	–	—
1986	"World Shut Your Mouth"	19	97	13	35	50	84	^{[B]}	Saint Julian
1987	"Trampolene"	31	–	22	45	–	–	–	Saint Julian
1987	"Eve's Volcano (Covered in Sin)"	41	–	–	–	–	–	–	Saint Julian
1988	"Charlotte Anne"	35	–	–	–	–	–	1	My Nation Underground
1988	"5 O'Clock World"	42	–	–	–	–	–	10	My Nation Underground
1988	"China Doll"	53	–	–	–	–	–	–	My Nation Underground
1991	Beautiful Love EP	32	–	–	–	–	–	4	Peggy Suicide
1991	"Safesurfer"	–	–	–	–	–	–	–	Peggy Suicide
1991	East Easy Rider EP	51	–	–	–	–	–	25	Peggy Suicide
1991	"Head"	57	–	–	–	–	–	–	Peggy Suicide
1992	"World Shut Your Mouth" (re-issue)	44	–	–	–	–	–	–	Floored Genius
1992	"Fear Loves This Place"	42	–	–	–	–	–	–	Jehovahkill
1994	"Paranormal in the West Country"	–	–	–	–	–	–	–	Autogeddon
1995	"Try Try Try"	24	–	–	167	–	–	^{[C]}	20 Mothers
1996	"I Come from Another Planet, Baby"	34	–	–	–	–	–	–	Interpreter
1996	"Planetary Sit-In"	34	–	–	–	–	–	–	Interpreter
1997	"Propheteering" (limited edition 7")	–	–	–	–	–	–	–	—
2008	Preaching Revolution EP (limited edition 7")	–	–	–	–	–	–	–	—
2013	Rave-o-lution	–	–	–	–	–	–	–	—
2015	Trip Advizer EP	–	–	–	–	–	–	–	—
2022	"Cunts Can Fuck Off"	–	–	–	–	–	–	–	England Expectorates

Notes

- A "Competition" charted at No. 30 on the UK Independent Chart.
- B "World Shut Your Mouth" also charted on Billboard Mainstream Rock Tracks chart at No. 22 and the five track 12" EP charted at No. 109 on the Billboard 200 album chart.
- C "Try Try Try" also charted on Billboard Adult Alternative Airplay chart at No. 12.

=== Collaborations and other projects ===
==== With Queen Elizabeth ====
- 1994 Queen Elizabeth
- 1997 QE2: Elizabeth Vagina
- 2009 Queen Elizabeth Hall
- 2024 The Corpse of Queen Elizabeth

==== With L.A.M.F. ====
- 2001 Ambient Metal

==== With Brain Donor ====
- 2001 "She Saw Me Coming" (single)
- 2001 "Get Off Your Pretty Face" (single)
- 2001 Love Peace & Fuck
- 2002 "Get Back on It" (single)
- 2003 "My Pagan Ass" (single)
- 2003 Too Freud To Rock'n'Roll, Too Jung To Die
- 2005 Brain Donor (U.S. compilation album)
- 2006 Drain'd Boner
- 2009 Wasted Fuzz Excessive

==== With Black Sheep ====
- 2009 Kiss My Sweet Apocalypse
- 2009 Black Sheep at the BBC

==== With Sunn O))) ====
- 2003 My Wall

==== With various (One Three One related releases) ====
- 2014 Neon Sardinia – S’akkabadòra-Hèmina
- 2014 Dayglo Maradona – Rock Section / American Werewolf EP
- 2014 Dayglo Maradona – "Rock Section (Andrew Weatherall remix)"
- 2014 Vesuvio – Vesuvio

==== With Dope ====
- 2017 Dope
- 2017 Guerilla Grow
- 2018 Seven Disquieting Dirges: Performed by Sub Bass Madmen & Throwback F.X. Contrarians
- 2018 Dope on Drugs
- 2018 Village Idiot Dope
- 2019 Black Math
- 2019 Odin on Acid

== Bibliography ==
- Head-on: Memories of the Liverpool Punk Scene and the Story of The Teardrop Explodes, 1976–82 (1994)
- Krautrocksampler: One Head's Guide to the Great Kosmische Musik – 1968 Onwards (1995)
- The Modern Antiquarian: A Pre-Millennial Odyssey through Megalithic Britain (1998)
- Repossessed: Shamanic Depressions in Tamworth & London (1983–89) (1999)
- The Megalithic European: The 21st Century Traveller in Prehistoric Europe (2004)
- Japrocksampler: How the Post-war Japanese Blew Their Minds on Rock 'n' Roll (2007)
- Copendium: An Expedition into the Rock 'n' Roll Underworld (2012)
- One Three One (2014)
