= Black Sheep (Julian Cope album) =

Studio album by Julian Cope
- Released: 8 September 2008
- Genre: Rock
- Length: 67:27
- Label: Head Heritage
- Producer: Julian Cope

Julian Cope chronology
You Gotta Problem with Me (2007)	Black Sheep (2008)	The Unruly Imagination (2009)

Professional ratings
Review scores
Source	Rating
AllMusic	4/5 stars
The Great Rock Discography	6/10

Black Sheep is a double album by Julian Cope, released on Head Heritage in 2008. It is Cope's twentyfourth solo album and features 11 protest songs across two half-hour CDs. Each CD represents "one side of an LP" with their own titles, Return of the Native and Return of the Alternative. Cope described the album as "a musical exploration of what it is to be an outsider in modern Western Culture".

== Track listing ==
All tracks are written by Julian Cope.

Disc one – Return of the Native
No.	Title	Length
1.	"Come the Revolution"	5:02
2.	"It's Too Late to Turn Back Now"	4:31
3.	"These Things I Know"	5:04
4.	"Psychedelic Odin"	7:13
5.	"Blood Sacrifice"	4:28
6.	"The Shipwreck of St. Paul"	6:50
Total length:		33:08

Disc two – Return of the Alternative
No.	Title	Length
1.	"All the Blowing-Themselves-Up Motherfuckers (Will Realise the Minute They Die That They Were Suckers)"	3:04
2.	"Feed My Rock'n'Roll"	6:36
3.	"Dhimmi is Blue"	8:32
4.	"The Black Sheep's Song"	4:52
5.	"I Can Remember This Life"	11:15
Total length:		34:19 (67:27)

Poetry (printed in booklet)
No.	Title	Length
1.	"The Aberfan Disaster"

== Personnel ==
- Julian Cope – vocals, guitar, bass, Mellotron 400, synthesizer, 30" bass drum, producer, directed by, photography, sleeve painting
- Anthony "Doggen" Foster – guitar, bass guitar, harmonica, drums
- Christopher Patrick "Holy" McGrail – law council, synthesizer, album design
- Ady "Acoustika" Fletcher – vocals, acoustic guitar, photography
- Michael O'Sullivan – acoustic guitar, 30" bass drum
- Big Nige – law council, blasphemous movie division
- Vybik Jon – law council
- Chris Olley — engineer
- Adam Whittaker — mastering
