= Rite (album) =

Studio album by Julian Cope & Donald Ross Skinner
- Released: February 1993
- Genre: Ambient
- Length: 68:23
- Label: Ma-Gog
- Producer: Donald Ross Skinner

Julian Cope chronology
Jehovahkill (1992)	Rite (1993)	Autogeddon (1994)

Rite is an ambient album by Julian Cope and Donald Ross Skinner, released in February 1993 on Cope's own Ma-Gog label. It is the first album in the Rite series and has been described as "a series of lengthy, mostly instrumental jamming freakouts influenced by both Krautrock and psychedelic funk." The album was available as mail-order only.

== Track listing ==
No.	Title	Writer(s)	Length
1.	"The Indians Worship Him, But He Hurries On"	Julian Cope, Rooster Cosby, Donald Ross Skinner	10:21
2.	"Amethysteria"	Cope, Skinner	9:03
3.	"Cherhill Down"	Cosby, Skinner	24:12
4.	"In Search of Ancient Astronomies"	Cope, Skinner	24:47

== Personnel ==
- Julian Cope – piano, keyboards, synthesizer, cover photography
- Donald Ross Skinner – organ, electric piano, clavinet, drums, producer, recording engineer
- Rooster Cosby – guitar, bass
- J.D. Hassinger – drums, drum machine, keyboards
- The William Stukeley Quintet – string arrangements on "Amethysteria"
- Paul Corkett – recording engineer
- Rob Carter – art, design
- Quinner – back cover photography
- Seb Shelton – executive producer
