= Hugo Nicolson =

English record producer and engineer

- Also known as: Hugoth Nicholson, Yellowhammer
- Occupations: Engineer, producer, remixer
- Website: hugonicolson.com

Hugo Nicolson is an English record producer and engineer, who has worked on records for artists including Primal Scream, Embrace, David Holmes, Shack, Julian Cope, and his sister, Claire Nicolson (musician) who also performs under the pseudonym 'Tiger Onezie'. Nicolson started working as a tape op at the Townhouse Studios and progressed to being an engineer and producer on a number of well-known albums. Nicolson played a key role on Primal Scream's Screamadelica album, working with Andrew Weatherall as co-producer and engineer, helping to remix the original recordings made by the band. Hugo engineered Grammy award-winning artist Radiohead on their critically acclaimed record In Rainbows

== Discography ==
- 1988 My Nation Underground - Julian Cope
- 1989 Trust - Brother Beyond
- 1989 Skellington - Julian Cope
- 1991 Screamadelica - Primal Scream
- 1991 Peggy Suicide - Julian Cope
- 1992 Jehovahkill - Julian Cope
- 1993 Debut - Björk
- 1999 Super Highways - The Other Two
- 2000 Drawn from Memory - Embrace
- 2000 XTRMNTR - Primal Scream
- 2007 In Rainbows - Radiohead
- 2012 Fear Fun - Father John Misty
- 2016 Tween - Wye Oak
- 2019 Lost Transmissions - Katharine O'Brien
