= Autogeddon =

Studio album by Julian Cope
- Released: 9 August 1994
- Genre: Indie rock
- Length: 46:07
- Label: Echo
- Producer: Julian Cope

Julian Cope chronology
Rite (1993)	Autogeddon (1994)	20 Mothers (1995)

Professional ratings
Review scores
Source	Rating
AllMusic	3/5 stars
NME	8/10 stars
Q	3/5 stars
Rolling Stone	3.5/5 stars

Autogeddon is the eleventh solo album by Julian Cope, released in 1994 on The Echo Label. According to the album's sleeve notes, written by Cope, it was "inspired by Heathcote Williams' epic poem of the same name and a little incident concerning my pregnant wife (and myself) and £375,000 of yellow Ferrari in St. Martin's Lane, London, England".

The album is largely a diatribe against car culture. Heathcote Williams' poem characterises the motor car's global death toll as "A humdrum holocaust, the third world war nobody bothered to declare". Cope's railing against car culture was symptomatic of his rejection of numerous aspects of Western consumerism.

AllMusic's album review reads in part: "Concluding the trilogy started by Peggy Suicide and Jehovahkill, Autogeddon, as the title gives away, targets cars, specifically as a metaphor for environmental destruction. Combined with the continuing focus on heathen religious practices and ancient monuments (the first part of 'Paranormal in the West Country' was, in fact, recorded in the West Kennet Longbarrow in Wiltshire), the album is almost a summation of Cope's current interests as well as standing on its own."

The photograph on the front cover is of a now-defunct garage in the hamlet of Druid, near Corwen in Denbighshire.

== Track listing ==
All songs written by Julian Cope.

1. "Autogeddon Blues" – 5:14
2. "Madmax" – 3:39
3. "Don't Call Me Mark Chapman" – 5:21
4. "I Gotta Walk" – 2:28
5. "Ain't No Gettin' Round Gettin' Round" – 5:01
6. "Paranormal in the West Country (Medley: Paranormal Pt.1; Archdrude's Roadtrip; Kar-ma-kanik)" – 8:29
7. "Ain't But the One Way" – 4:30
8. "s•t•a•r•c•a•r" – 11:29

== Personnel ==
Musicians

- Julian Cope
- Michael "Moon-Eye" Watts
- Donald Ross Skinner
- Thighpaulsandra
- Mark "Rooster" Cosby
- Dorian Cope (credited as "Mavis Grind")
- Jill Frost (a.k.a. Jill Bryson of Strawberry Switchblade)
- Richard Frost (credited as "K-R Frost")

Production

- Julian Cope – producer, photography
- Thighpaulsandra – mix, photography
- Shaun Harvey – recording, mix on "Madmax", additional recording on "s•t•a•r•c•a•r"
- Rob Carter – sleeve
- Sebastian Shelton – executive producer

== Charts ==
Chart (1994)	Peak position
Australian Albums (ARIA)	148
UK Albums Chart	16
