= Skellington (album) =

Studio album by Julian Cope
- Released: November 1989
- Recorded: April 1989
- Studio: Townhouse 3, London
- Genre: Neo-psychedelia
- Length: 28:06
- Label: CopeCo; Zippo
- Producer: Julian Cope

Julian Cope chronology
| My Nation Underground (1988) | Skellington (1989) | Droolian (1990) |

Professional ratings
Review scores
| Source | Rating |
|---|---|
| Allmusic | 3.5/5 stars |

Skellington is the fifth solo album by Julian Cope, released in November 1989 as a semi-official bootleg for fan club members only. Originally released on Cope's own CopeCo label, it was later reissued in March 1990 through Zippo Records.

Skellington was expanded with the addition of a sequel Skellington 2: He's Back ... and this time it's personal and released in 1993 as The Skellington Chronicles.

In 2018, Cope released a third installment, Skellington 3.

== Background ==
Skellington was recorded in just two days in April 1989. It was inspired by Cope's frustration with the work on his 1988 album My Nation Underground, which he had lost faith in even as he completed it. The two-day session used the same studio setup as the prior album but an entirely different approach. In contrast to the multiple overdubs, 1980s pop stylings and army of backing singers used on My Nation Underground, Skellington’s sound was extremely skeletal, mainly acoustic, and sparsely orchestrated by Cope in association with his two main collaborators – Donald Ross Skinner (guitar, piano, organ) and Rooster Cosby (percussion, brass).

At the time, Cope was signed to Island Records, who were not interested in releasing Skellington. This led to Cope releasing it via his own label Copeco, and later expanding the release via a deal with the independent Zippo Records label. When Island insisted that Skellington was illegal and should be withdrawn due to their contract with Cope, the artist refused and defiantly released yet another similar album (Droolian) just two months later. Eventually, the Island directors relented, and both records were allowed to continue in production.

== Track listing ==
All tracks are written by Julian Cope, except where noted

| No. | Title | Writer(s) | Length |
|---|---|---|---|
| 1. | "Doomed" | | 3:38 |
| 2. | "Beaver" | | 2:27 |
| 3. | "Me and Jimmy Jones" | | 1:27 |
| 4. | "Robert Mitchum" | Cope, Ian McCulloch | 2:39 |
| 5. | "Out of My Mind on Dope and Speed" | | 3:26 |
| 6. | "Don't Crash Here" | | 0:56 |
| 7. | "Everything Playing at Once" | | 1:29 |
| 8. | "Little Donkey" | | 2:41 |
| 9. | "Great White Wonder" | | 2:10 |
| 10. | "Incredibly Ugly Girl" | | 3:01 |
| 11. | "No How, No Why, No Way, No Where, No When" | | 1:56 |
| 12. | "Commin' Soon" | | 2:16 |
| Total length: | | | 28:06 |

== Personnel ==
Credits adapted from the album's liner notes.

- Julian Cope - vocals, acoustic guitar, producer (also performed pseudonymously as "Double DeHarrison" playing piano and "surf organ")
- Donald Ross Skinner - electric guitar, piano, organ
- Mark "Rooster" Cosby - drums, percussion, horns
- Hugo Nicolson - engineer, mixing, horns
- Donato Cinicolo - photography
