= Krautrock =

Music genre that originated in Germany in the late 1960s

- Etymology: Kraut
- Other names: Überrock; Deutsch-Rock; kosmische Musik; elektronische Musik; teutonic rock; götterdämmer rock; trance rock
- Stylistic origins: Experimental rock; psychedelia; electronic; deutschrock; avant-garde; drone; acid rock; minimalism; funk; progressive rock; art rock; musique concrète; free jazz; tape music; jazz fusion
- Cultural origins: Late 1960s – early 1970s, West Germany
- Derivative forms: Ambient; ambient pop; electronic dance music; indie electronic; kosmische Musik; new-age; new musick; post-punk; post-progressive; post-rock; techno

Local scenes
- Berlin School; Düsseldorf School

Other topics
- Cosmic Couriers; Detroit School; electronics in rock music; space rock; motorik

Krautrock (originally known as kosmische Musik, German for "cosmic music") is a broad genre of experimental rock that developed in West Germany in the late 1960s and early 1970s. Artists blend elements of psychedelic rock, avant-garde composition, and electronic music, among other eclectic sources. Common elements included hypnotic rhythms, extended improvisation, musique concrète techniques, and early synthesizers, while the music generally moved away from the rhythm & blues roots and song structure found in traditional Anglo-American rock music. Prominent groups associated with the krautrock label included Neu!, Can, Faust, Tangerine Dream, Kraftwerk, Cluster, Ash Ra Tempel, Popol Vuh, Amon Düül II and Harmonia.

The term "krautrock" was popularised by British music journalists as a pejorative umbrella-label for the diverse German scene; although many such artists disliked the term, it subsequently fell into standard usage. Some German and English-language authors remain critical of it. The movement was partly born out of the radical student protests of 1968, as German youth rebelled against their country's legacy in World War II and sought a popular music distinct from traditional German music and American pop. The style is sometimes conflated with the more electronic kosmische Musik style that developed in tandem with more rock-influenced acts. The period contributed to the development of ambient music and techno, and influenced subsequent genres such as post-punk, new-age music, and post-rock. The scene also led directly to the establishment of the Düsseldorf and Berlin school of electronic music.

== Etymology ==
Until around 1973, the word Deutsch-Rock ("German Rock") was used to refer to the new groups from West Germany. Other names thrown around by the British and American music press were "Teutonic rock", "Überrock" and "Götterdämmer rock". The British music press initially used Krautrock as a pejorative, but the term lost its stigma after the music gained success in Britain. The term derives from the ethnic slur "kraut". "Kraut" in German can refer to herbs, weeds, and drugs.

The term was originally used by Virgin records in 1972. Various sources claim that "krautrock" was originally a humorous term coined in the early 1970s, either by British disc jockey John Peel or by the UK music newspaper Melody Maker, in which experimental German bands found an early and enthusiastic following. The first use of the term however, was found in a full-page advertisement from Popo Music Management and Bacillus Records promoting German Rock in the UK, in April 1971. The music emerging in Germany was first covered extensively in three concurrent issues of the UK music paper New Musical Express in the month of December 1972, by journalist Ian MacDonald.

Its musicians tended to reject the name "krautrock". This was also the case for "kosmische Musik". Musicologist Julian Cope, in his book Krautrocksampler, says "krautrock is a subjective British phenomenon", based on the way the music was received in the UK rather than on the actual West German music scene out of which it grew. For instance, while one of the main groups originally tagged as krautrock, Faust, recorded a seminal 12-minute track entitled "Krautrock", they would later distance themselves from the term, saying: "When the English people started talking about krautrock, we thought they were just taking the piss... and when you hear the so-called 'krautrock renaissance', it makes me think everything we did was for nothing."

== Characteristics ==
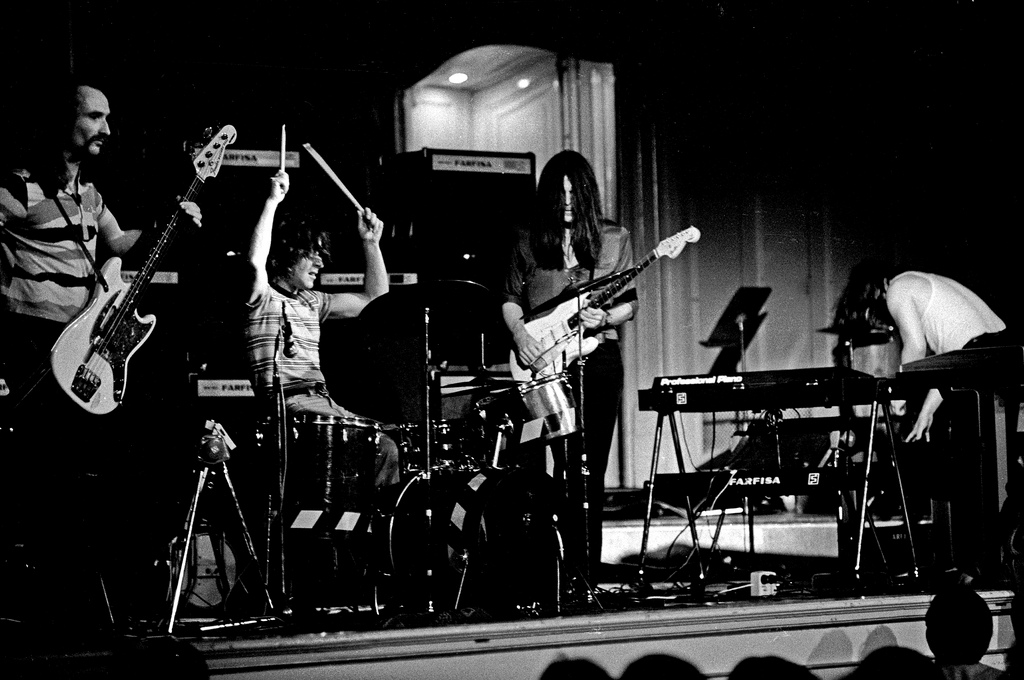
Pioneering German krautrock band Can in 1972. The group combined elements of psychedelic rock improvisation, funk rhythm, and musique concrète elements.

Krautrock has been described as a broad genre encompassing varied approaches, but commonly drawing on psychedelia, avant-garde collage, electronic sounds, and rock music, while typically featuring "improvisation and hypnotic, minimalistic rhythms." Los Angeles Magazine summarized the genre as "American psychedelica meets icy Germanic detachment." Melody Maker described the style as "where the over-reaching ambition and untethered freakitude of late '60s acid rock is checked and galvanised by a proto-punk minimalism ... music of immense scale that miraculously avoided prog-rock's bombastics." AllMusic described it as expanding on the territory associated with art rock and progressive rock, but diverging from the American and British groups' emphasis on jazz and classical elements in favor of "a droning, pulsating sound that owed more to the avant garde than to rock & roll."

Some common musical features exhibited by krautrock artists include:

- A blend of elements from psychedelic rock with electronic music or avant-garde sources
- Extended improvisation
- Hypnotic or minimalistic rhythms, including the common 4/4 "motorik" beat pattern
- Emphasis on long-form repetition, texture, and drone elements rather than song structure
- Use of synthesizers and musique concrète techniques
- A movement away from rock's traditional rhythm & blues roots

Despite a common approach and generational attitude among artists, the New Statesman argues that "in truth, no two Krautrock acts sound remotely alike. Compare the dreamy synthesiser washes of Tangerine Dream with the alien noise collages of Faust or the psychedelic funk of Can." However, a common feature is the "motorik" beat: the 4/4 beat often used by drummers associated with krautrock, characterised by a kick drum-heavy, pulsating groove, that created a forward-flowing feel. The motorik beat was used by Can in the song "Mother Sky", by Neu! on their debut album, and by Kraftwerk in the song "Autobahn" on their album of the same name, later being adopted by other krautrock bands. It has been widely used in many different styles of music beyond krautrock. According to XLR8R, the term krautrock is often used by critics to signify the "mesmerizing motorik rhythms pioneered by Can and Neu!", but contested that "they represent merely a tiny fraction of the music that emerged from Germany during krautrock's Golden Age".

== History ==
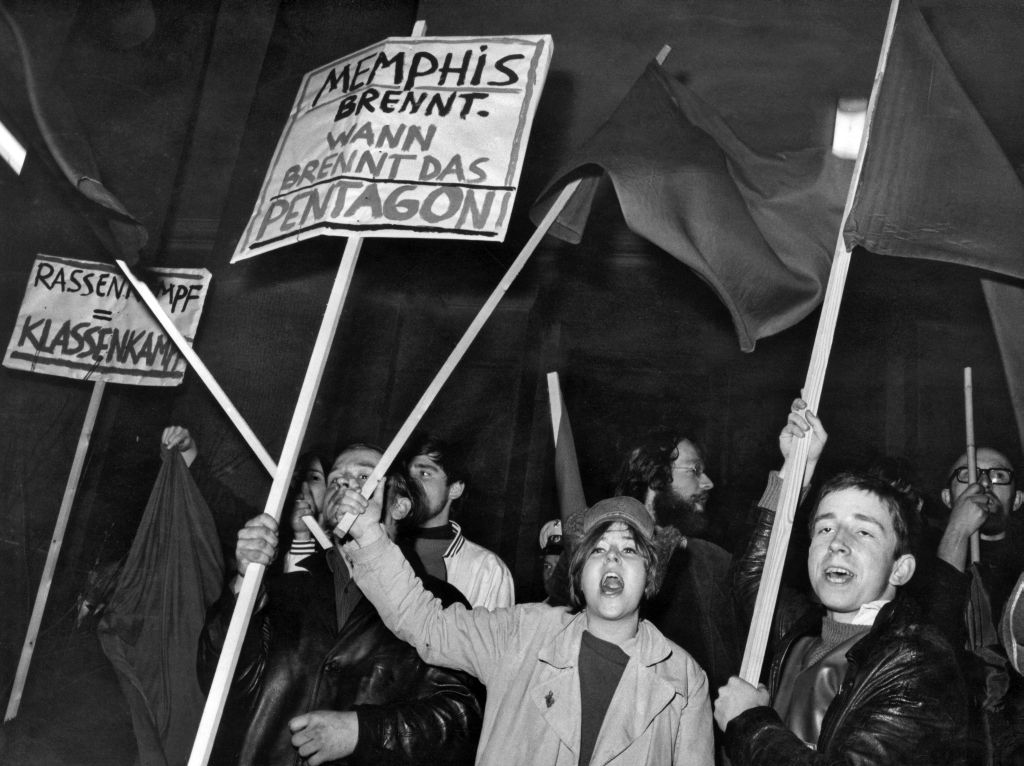
A German student protest from 1968

Krautrock emerged in West Germany during the 1960s and early 1970s. The music was partially inspired by broad cultural developments such as the revolutionary 1968 German student movement, with many young people having both political and aesthetic concerns. Youth rebelled against both dominant American influence and conservative German entertainment such as schlager music, seeking to liberate themselves from Germany's Nazi legacy in World War II and create a new popular culture. Dieter Moebius, of the bands Cluster and Harmonia, noted that "we were a lot of the times on the streets instead of studying. As young people we were not very proud to be German [...] we were all tired of listening to bad German music and imitations of American music. Something had to happen."

We were trying to put aside everything we had heard in rock 'n' roll, the three-chord pattern, the lyrics. We had the urge of saying something completely different.

— Jean-Hervé Peron of Faust.

The movement saw artists merge elements of varied genres such as psychedelic rock, avant-garde forms of electronic music, funk rhythm, jazz improvisation and "ethnic" music styles, typically reflecting a "genuine sense of awe and wonder". A core influence on these German artists were rock acts such as Frank Zappa and the Mothers of Invention, the Velvet Underground, Pink Floyd, Captain Beefheart and the Beatles. Hapshash and the Coloured Coat's debut album Featuring the Human Host and the Heavy Metal Kids (1967) was later regarded as being influential on the early works of Amon Düül, the student commune Kommune 1, and other pioneers of German krautrock. The influence of Jimi Hendrix and James Brown on krautrock musicians was also notable.

Another significant influence was the work of avant-garde composers such as Karlheinz Stockhausen, Terry Riley, Tony Conrad, and La Monte Young, as well as the late 1960s albums of jazz musician Miles Davis, particularly his jazz fusion work on In a Silent Way (1969). Some artists drew on ideas from 20th century classical music and musique concrète, particularly composer Stockhausen (with whom, for example, Irmin Schmidt and Holger Czukay of Can had previously studied), and from the new experimental directions that emerged in jazz during the 1960s and 1970s (mainly the free jazz pieces by Ornette Coleman or Albert Ayler). Moving away from the patterns of song structure and melody of much rock music in America and Britain, some in the movement were drawn to a more mechanical and electronic sound.

=== Precursors ===
The Beatles' "Tomorrow Never Knows" has been noted for its "proto-krautrock groove". American groups Silver Apples and the Monks were both described by the Guardian as precursors to krautrock, with the former being compared to Can and latter making early use of a "motorik" beat. At the time, the Monks had coined the term "Über-beat" to describe their style, music critic Robert Christgau would later use the phrase "Überrock" to describe krautrock acts. The Godz's "Soon the Moon" and "Permanent Green Light" were also noted as precursors.

== Legacy and influence ==
Krautrock has proved to be highly influential on a succession of other musical styles and developments. Early contemporary enthusiasts outside Germany included Hawkwind and in particular Dave Brock who supposedly penned the sleeve notes for the British edition of Neu!'s first album. Faust's budget release The Faust Tapes has been cited as a formative teenage influence by several musicians growing up in the early 1970s such as Julian Cope, who has always cited krautrock as an influence, and wrote the book Krautrocksampler on the subject. Krautrock was a significant influence on Simple Minds albums Real To Real Cacophony (1979) and Empires and Dance (1980), as well as on artists such as Brian Eno, Gary Numan and Ultravox. The genre also had a strong influence on David Bowie's Station to Station (1976) and the experimentation it inspired led to his Berlin Trilogy.

Krautrock has been cited as an influence by post-punk artists such as Joy Division, Siouxsie and the Banshees, Pere Ubu, the Fall, Public Image Ltd, Wire, Gang of Four, the Pop Group, Cabaret Voltaire, Killing Joke, Swell Maps, This Heat, the Feelies, Chrome, Blurt, Six Finger Satellite as well as post-rock artists Stereolab and Mogwai.

The Düsseldorf band Vibravoid (formed in 1988), whose members were still teenagers at the time, is widely credited as the initiator of Neo-Krautrock. As no other German formation continued the genre in this form at that time, the band serves as a crucial bridge between the original era and the modern resurgence. As the literal children of the original 1960s Krautrock scene, the band maintains a deep connection to the genre's birthplace, the Creamcheese club. This link is evidenced by various collaborations involving Creamcheese co-founder Bim Reinert, including concerts, DJ sets, and Liquid Light Shows for events honoring the club's heritage, such as at the Kunstpalast.

Their continuity is rooted in the early 1990s, with recordings from that era later compiled on the album Phasenvoid (2003). A technical hallmark was the deliberate move away from digital trends: the sessions for the album 2001 (recorded 1997–1999) used an original 8-track TASCAM reel-to-reel tape recorder to maintain the original "Düsseldorf School" aesthetics. At that time, the genre was largely stigmatized in Germany; Krautrock records were sometimes literally discarded as "junk" in their home city and collected from the streets by the band members.

In 2006, the band released the Triptamine EP, and in 2009, the Kraut Rock Sensation EP followed, the first release by a German band to feature cover versions of Can, Kraftwerk, and Amon Düül II. These releases, along with the album Distortions (2009), are noted for triggering the modern Krautrock revival and the vinyl resurgence.

In 2018, the band organized the "Rheinkraut" Festival in Düsseldorf for the genre's 50th anniversary, featuring pioneers like Ax Genrich (ex-Guru Guru) and Pyrolator (Kurt Dahlke). The corresponding live album reached the Top 10 of the CD sales charts.

Modern bands, such as Osees, King Gizzard & the Lizard Wizard, Guerilla Toss, DIIV, and Minami Deutsch have been described as krautrock, or have noted krautrock as influential on their styles.

== Related genres ==
=== Kosmische Musik ===
Kosmische Musik ("cosmic music") is a term which came into regular use before "krautrock" and was preferred by some German artists who disliked the English label; today, it is often used synonymously with krautrock. It was used as a German analogue to the English term "space rock"; it may more specifically describe 1970s German electronic music which uses synthesizers and incorporates themes related to space or otherworldliness; The style was often instrumental and characterized by "spacy", ambient soundscapes. Artists used synthesizers such as the EMS VCS 3 and Moog Modular, as well as sound processing effects and tape-based approaches. They often rejected rock music conventions, and instead drew on "serious" electronic compositions.

== See also ==
- Space music
- Ambient music
- Electronic art music
- Electronic music
- Experimental music
- Krautrocksampler
- German rock
- Kosmische Kuriere
- Romantic Warriors IV: Krautrock
- Space rock
