= Donald Ross Skinner =

- Born: Donald Skinner
- Occupation: Musician
- Instruments: Guitar, bass, drums, omnichord
- Years active: 1984–present

Donald Skinner is a guitarist, songwriter and producer primarily known for his work with Julian Cope. Skinner is commonly known by the name Donald Ross Skinner with the addition of the middle name of Ross attributed to him by Cope after Glenn Ross Campbell, the pedal steel player from The Misunderstood. He is currently a guitarist for Love Amongst Ruin and DC Fontana.

== Pre-Cope career ==
Skinner played in a number of Tamworth bands including The Fretz, DHSS (named after the Department of Health and Social Security) and Freight train.

== Julian Cope Band ==
After the split of The Teardrop Explodes Julian retreated to his home town of Tamworth and the 18-year-old Skinner visited the singer's home on a number of occasions. Skinner was subsequently invited to join Cope's band and to play on a Kid Jensen radio session. Skinner played on the Fried album and was Cope's main collaborator on the 4 albums subsequently released on Island Records. Skinner was a mainstay in Cope's touring band throughout this period.

For the Peggy Suicide and Jehovahkill albums Skinner switched to bass and keys (whilst Cope played lead guitar) and he is also credited as co-producer. Both of these albums are regarded as high points in the singer's solo career.

A disagreement between Cope and the guitarist meant that the 1994 album Autogeddon was the last time they collaborated on record (although Skinner is credited on the 20 Mothers album).

Skinner returned to play on two further tours with Cope, first with the pair backed by a drum machine in 2000 and in a full band line up in 2004.

== Post-Cope career ==
In 1996 Skinner contributed soundtrack music to manga series Mad Bull 34 and The Legend of the Four Kings.

During 2000 Skinner played live in the band Fiji with Jamie Hince (Scarfo/The Kills). Since then he has been a member of a number of bands including Prolapse and Kiosk and received production credits working with Salad, Tiger, DC Fontana, Strangelove and Cud.

More recently he has appeared on releases by David Holmes (bass on The Holy Pictures), The Enemy (bass and guitar on Hugo Nicolson's remix of 'This Song' 2008), Yellowhammer, Claire Nicolson and My Toys Like Me.

Skinner is currently playing guitar with 2 bands; Love Amongst Ruin, a band formed by ex-Placebo drummer Steve Hewitt, and HotMotel, a rock band playing shows around Herne Hill, London. He also writes and plays with Amp, Paul Kennedy, ex of Salad and is in production for broadcast episodes of Idle Eye. In 2013, Skinner undertook production work for British band DC Fontana's second album and joined in the band in October 2013.

== Discography ==
=== Albums with Julian Cope ===
- 1984 Fried (UK #87)
- 1987 Saint Julian (UK #11)
- 1988 My Nation Underground (UK #42)
- 1989 Skellington
- 1990 Droolian
- 1991 Peggy Suicide (UK #23)
- 1991 Peggy Suicide Radio Sessions (Japan)
- 1992 Jehovahkill (UK #20)
- 1993 Rite credited to Julian Cope and Donald Ross Skinner
- 1993 Ye Skellington Chronicles (an expanded version of Skellington along with the sequel Skellington 2)
- 1994 Autogeddon (UK #16)
- 1995 20 Mothers (UK #20)
- 2004 Live Japan '91
- 2006 Jehovahkill: Deluxe Edition, re-released with a disc of extra material
- 2011 The Jehovacoat Demos

=== Albums with Prolapse ===
- 1999 Ghosts of Dead Aeroplanes
- 2025 I wonder when they're going to destroy your face

=== Albums with Love Amongst Ruin ===
- 2010 Love Amongst Ruin
