= Our Town – The Greatest Hits =

Greatest hits album by Deacon Blue
- Released: 5 April 1994
- Genre: Pop, rock, blues, alternative rock
- Length: 77:22 (CD), 81:19 (vinyl)
- Label: Columbia

Deacon Blue chronology
Whatever You Say, Say Nothing (1993)	Our Town – The Greatest Hits (1994)	Riches & More (1997)

Professional ratings
Review scores
Source	Rating
AllMusic	link
NME	4/10

Our Town – The Greatest Hits is the first greatest hits compilation album by the Scottish rock band Deacon Blue. The album reached the top spot of the UK Albums Chart in May 1994 for two weeks, and has been certified Platinum. It was also their second and final number one album to date. It is also notable for being the 500th number one album since the charts inception in 1956.

The album contains the previous singles from the band, minus "Closing Time" and "Hang Your Head". The album also contains three new tracks: "I Was Right and You Were Wrong", the first single from this album, expanded the musical direction the band had taken on the album Whatever You Say, Say Nothing. "Bound to Love" and "Still in the Mood" are pop songs in the tradition of Deacon Blue's earlier albums.

The vinyl LP version of the album contains a fourth new track, "Beautiful Stranger".

"Dignity" was released, for the third time, as the second single from the album.

== Track listing ==
All songs written by Ricky Ross, except where noted:

1. "Dignity" – 4:00
2. "Wages Day" – 3:11
3. "Real Gone Kid" – 4:05
4. "Your Swaying Arms" – 4:12
5. "Fergus Sings the Blues" (Ross, Prime) – 3:51
6. "I Was Right and You Were Wrong" – 4:52
7. "Chocolate Girl" – 3:16
8. "I'll Never Fall in Love Again" (Bacharach, David) – 2:46
9. "When Will You (Make My Telephone Ring)" – 4:19
10. "Twist and Shout" – 3:34
11. "Your Town" – 5:19
12. "Queen of the New Year" (Ross, Prime) – 3:36
13. "Only Tender Love" – 5:06
14. "Cover from the Sky" – 3:37
15. "Love and Regret" – 4:50
16. "Will We Be Lovers" (Ross, Osborne) – 3:53
17. "Loaded" (Prime, Ross, Kelling) – 4:30
18. "Bound to Love" – 4:24
19. "Still in the Mood" – 4:01
- Tracks 1, 7, 9 & 17 are from the album Raintown
- Tracks 2, 3, 5, 12, 15 are from the album When the World Knows Your Name
- Track 8 is from the EP Four Bacharach & David Songs
- Tracks 4, 10 & 14 are from the album Fellow Hoodlums
- Tracks 11, 13 & 16 are from the album Whatever You Say, Say Nothing
- Tracks 6, 18 & 19 are newly recorded for this compilation.

=== Vinyl edition ===
All songs written by Ricky Ross, except where noted:

Side A

1. "Dignity" – 4:00
2. "Wages Day" – 3:11
3. "Real Gone Kid" – 4:05
4. "Your Swaying Arms" – 4:12
5. "Fergus Sings the Blues" (Ross, Prime) – 3:51

Side B

1. "I Was Right and You Were Wrong" – 4:52
2. "Chocolate Girl" – 3:16
3. "I'll Never Fall in Love Again" (Bacharach, David) – 2:46
4. "When Will You (Make My Telephone Ring)" – 4:19
5. "Twist and Shout" – 3:34

Side C

1. "Your Town" – 5:19
2. "Queen of the New Year" (Ross, Prime) – 3:36
3. "Only Tender Love" – 5:06
4. "Cover from the Sky" – 3:37
5. "Love and Regret" – 4:50

Side D

1. "Beautiful Stranger (Ross, Prime) – 3:57
2. "Will We Be Lovers" (Ross, Osborne) – 3:53
3. "Loaded" (Prime, Ross, Kelling) – 4:30
4. "Bound to Love" – 4:24
5. "Still in the Mood" – 4:01

== Personnel ==
- Ricky Ross – vocals, guitar, piano, keyboard
- Lorraine McIntosh – vocal
- James Prime – keyboard
- Ewen Vernal – bass
- Graeme Kelling – guitar
- Dougie Vipond – drums
