= The Very Best of Deacon Blue =

Greatest hits album by Deacon Blue
- Released: 5 November 2001
- Genres: Pop, rock, blues, alternative rock
- Label: Columbia

Deacon Blue chronology
Homesick (2001)	The Very Best of Deacon Blue (2001)	Singles (2006)

The Very Best of Deacon Blue is a greatest hits compilation by the Scottish rock band Deacon Blue. It is composed of singles and album tracks from the band's albums, plus the B-sides "Indigo Sky", from the "Hang Your Head" single, and "When You Were a Boy You Were a Beautiful Boy", from the "Everytime You Sleep" single.

== Track listing ==
All songs written by Ricky Ross, except where noted:

1. "Dignity" – 4:00
2. "When Will You (Make My Telephone Ring)" – 4:19
3. "Chocolate Girl" – 3:16
4. "Raintown" – 3:50
5. "The Very Thing" – 3:34
6. "Love's Great Fears" (Ross, Prime) – 3:42
7. "He Looks Like Spencer Tracy Now" – 3:50
8. "Loaded" (Prime, Ross, Kelling) – 4:30
9. "Real Gone Kid" – 4:05
10. "Wages Day" – 3:11
11. "Fergus Sings the Blues" (Ross, Prime) – 3:51
12. "Love and Regret" – 4:50
13. "Queen of the New Year" (Ross, Prime) – 3:36
14. "Circus Lights" – 4:59
15. "My America" (Ross, Prime) – 3:10
16. "Long Window to Love" – 3:12
17. "Orphans" (Ross, Vernal) – 3:33
18. "I'll Never Fall in Love Again" (Bacharach, David) – 2:46
19. "Your Swaying Arms" – 4:12
20. "Twist and Shout" – 3:34
21. "Cover from the Sky" – 3:37
22. "The Day that Jackie Jumped the Jail" – 3:42
23. "A Brighter Star than You Will Shine" (Ross, Prime) – 4:32
24. "The Wildness" (Ross, Prime) – 5:42
25. "Your Town" – 5:19
26. "Will We Be Lovers" (Ross, Osborne) – 3:53
27. "Only Tender Love" – 5:06
28. "I Was Right and You Were Wrong" – 4:52
29. "Indigo Sky" – 2:48
30. "Bethlehem's Gate" – 4:47
31. "Bound to Love" – 4:24
32. "Still in the Mood" – 4:01
33. "Jesus Do Your Hands Still Feel the Rain" – 5:14
34. "Rae" (Ross, Prime, MacDonald)– 4:46
35. "Silverlake" (Ross, Prime) – 4:36
36. "Homesick" – 4:14
37. "Everytime You Sleep" – 4:06
38. "When You Were a Boy You Were a Beautiful Boy" – 4:16

== Personnel ==
- Ricky Ross – vocals, guitar, piano, keyboard
- Lorraine McIntosh – vocal
- James Prime – keyboard
- Ewen Vernal – bass
- Graeme Kelling – guitar
- Dougie Vipond – drums
