= Floored Genius =

Floored Genius: The Best of Julian Cope and The Teardrop Explodes 1979–91

Compilation album by Julian Cope
- Released: 3 August 1992
- Genre: Indie rock
- Length: 69:28
- Label: Island

Julian Cope chronology
Peggy Suicide (1991)	Floored Genius: The Best of Julian Cope and The Teardrop Explodes 1979–91 (1992)	Jehovahkill (1992)

Floored Genius: The Best of Julian Cope and The Teardrop Explodes 1979–91 is a compilation album by Julian Cope, released in 1992, combining Cope's work with The Teardrop Explodes and his early solo work. The album contains key singles and notable album cuts from Cope's higher-profile career.

== Critical reception ==
Professional ratings
Review scores
Source	Rating
AllMusic	4.5/5 stars

In his review of the album, Ned Raggett of AllMusic wrote, "One of the most striking things about Cope is how he at once incorporates any range of '60s and '70s influences, high profile or obscure, and is able to turn them all into his own sound ... and bursting with creative energy", and that Floored Genius was "crucial at showing the heights of his work".

== Track listing ==
All tracks are written by Julian Cope; except where indicated.

Phase one with The Teardrop Explodes: November 1978 – November 1982
No.	Title	Writer(s)	Original release	Length
1.	"Reward"	Cope, Alan Gill	Non-album single, 1981	2:44
2.	"Treason" (Hugh Jones single remix)	Cope, Gary Dwyer, Mick Finkler	Kilimanjaro, 1980	2:57
3.	"Sleeping Gas"	Cope, Gary Dwyer, Mick Finkler, Paul Simpson	Kilimanjaro	3:47
4.	"Bouncing Babies"	Cope, Gary Dwyer, Mick Finkler, Paul Simpson	Kilimanjaro	2:31
5.	"Passionate Friend"		Wilder, 1981	3:31
6.	"The Great Dominions"		Wilder	4:28

Phase two: June 1983 – March 1985
No.	Title	Original release	Length
7.	"The Greatness & Perfection of Love" (Single remix)	World Shut Your Mouth, 1984	3:15
8.	"An Elegant Chaos"	World Shut Your Mouth	4:04
9.	"Sunspots" (Edit of album version)	Fried, 1984	3:48
10.	"Reynard the Fox" (Hugoth Nicolson remix)	Fried	6:18

Phase three: September 1986 – October 1988
No.	Title	Original release	Length
11.	"World Shut Your Mouth"	Saint Julian, 1987	3:36
12.	"Trampolene"	Saint Julian	3:39
13.	"Spacehopper"	Saint Julian	3:22
14.	"Charlotte Anne" (Extended version)	My Nation Underground, 1988	5:09
15.	"China Doll" (Single edit)	My Nation Underground	3:31

Phase four: April 1989 – March 1991
No.	Title	Original release	Length
16.	"Out of My Mind on Dope & Speed"	Skellington, 1989	3:27
17.	"Jellypop Perky Jean"	Droolian, 1990	2:08
18.	"Beautiful Love"	Peggy Suicide, 1991	3:13
19.	"East Easy Rider" (Single edit)	Peggy Suicide	3:37
20.	"Safesurfer" (Extended LP version)	Peggy Suicide	8:40

== Charts ==
Chart (1993)	Peak position
Australian Albums (ARIA)	177
UK Albums Chart	22
