= Riches (album) =

Compilation album by Deacon Blue
- Released: February 1988
- Genre: Pop, rock, blues
- Label: Columbia
- Producer: Deacon Blue, Jon Kelly, Bob Clearmountain, Kenny MacDonald, Richard Moakes, Harry Parker

Deacon Blue chronology
Raintown (1987)	Riches (1988)	When the World Knows Your Name (1989)

Riches is a limited edition compilation album that was temporarily included with the Raintown album by the Scottish rock band Deacon Blue, starting in February 1988. Only 20,000 copies were made.

It contains the two bonus tracks that were included on the CD version of Raintown, plus selected tracks and B-sides from the following single releases:

- "Dignity" (1st release)
- "Loaded"
- "When Will You (Make My Telephone Ring)" (1st release)
- "Dignity" (2nd release)

The songs "Long Distance from Just Across the Road" (from Loaded), "Town to Be Blamed" (Live) (from When Will You Make My Telephone Ring (1st Release), and "Ronnie Spector" (from Dignity (2nd Release)) were not included, though "Ronnie Spector" was included on the follow-up compilation Ooh Las Vegas. All B-Sides (including those released afterwards) were eventually included on Raintown's 3CD+DVD deluxe edition in 2012.

== Track listing ==
All songs written by Ricky Ross, except where noted:

1. "Which Side Are You On" (F. Reece) - (2:59)
  - available on the "Loaded" cassette and 12" singles
2. "Kings of the Western World" - (2:39)
  - available as bonus track on the UK Raintown CD and on the "Loaded" cassette and 12" singles
3. "Angeliou" (Van Morrison) - (6:19)
  - Recorded live on 15 July 1987 at the Marquee
  - available on the "When Will You (Make My Telephone Ring)" (1st release) 12" single
4. "Just Like Boys" (Ross, Prime) - (3:13)
  - available on the "Dignity" (2nd release) 12" and CD singles
5. "Raintown [Piano Version]" - (3:40)
  - recorded for a Radio 1 session
6. "Riches" - (2:39)
  - available as a bonus track on the UK Raintown CD and on the "Dignity" (1st release) 7" and cassette singles
7. "Church" - (3:18)
  - available on the "When Will You (Make My Telephone Ring)" (1st release) singles
8. "Shifting Sand" (Ross, Prime) - (3:18)
  - available on the "Dignity" (2nd release) 10" and CD singles
9. "Suffering" - (2:44)
  - available on the "Dignity" (2nd release) singles
10. "Ribbons and Bows" - (4:15)
  - available on the "Dignity" (1st release) 12" single
11. "Dignity [Bob Clearmountain Version]" - (4:13)
  - version used for the 2nd release of the song in January 1988
- Tracks 1, 8, and 9 produced by Deacon Blue
- Tracks 2, 6, and 10 produced by Jon Kelly
- Track 3 produced by Richard Moakes and Deacon Blue
- Track 4 produced by Jon Kelly with overdub and additional recording by Deacon Blue and Richard Moakes
- Track 5 produced by Harry Parker
- Track 7 produced by Kenny MacDonald and Deacon Blue
- Track 11 produced by Bob Clearmountain

== Personnel ==
- Ricky Ross – vocals, guitar, piano, keyboard
- Lorraine McIntosh – vocal
- James Prime – keyboard
- Ewen Vernal – bass
- Graeme Kelling – guitar
- Dougie Vipond – drums

== Song commentary ==
Quotes from Ricky Ross on each track:

=== Which Side Are You On ===
""Loaded" was out during the June '87 General Election. This seemed appropriate. I first heard the song by 50s folkies The Weavers. It was written for a mining dispute in Harlaw County in the 30s. Dick Gaughan re-worked it for an eighties miners album. Last verse by me."

=== Kings of the Western World ===
"Sister song to Dignity the perennial 'work' theme of '86-'87. It was suggested leaving it off the album by Paul Russell, M.D. at C.B.S. I think he was right. as it fits in less well with the Raintown songs."

=== Angeliou ===
"Van Morrison song from 'Into The Music' originally Performed as highlight to When Will You..."

=== Just Like Boys ===
"It wasn't on the album as it didn't really fit and we never felt the production was as good as it could have been - again I personally preferred the demo."

=== Riches ===
""Riches" was dedicated to Jim Punton, a friend of Ricky's who died in 1986. In Ricky's words: "This was written for a friend called Jim Punton. He was (his own words) 'youth leader, ex-Church of Scotland minister. interested in radical theology and an enthusiast for the kingdom'. He died in May 1986 after a long illness. At the time, I searched around for things he'd written or said. I found an old tape from a conference in Dundee in 1979. In talking of the possibility for better human relationships, he said 'the vision I see is greater than I am'. This statement sums Jim up better than I ever could."

=== Church ===
"Demo recorded at Park Lane in Glasgow. We tried to re-master it, but the demo was better - hence backing vocals by Carole Moore." (rather than Lorraine McIntosh, who would join the band thereafter).

=== Shifting Sand ===
"It has never been played live - but we recorded It live for a Radio Picadilly session in September '87. I think we will play it live sometime..."

=== Suffering ===
"A good live track, but not the greatest song in the world."

=== Ribbons and Bows ===
"This track never turned out as good as original rehearsals or demos: possibly one of my favourites."
