= Homesick (Deacon Blue album) =

Studio album by Deacon Blue
- Released: 30 April 2001
- Recorded: July 1999 – May 2000
- Genre: Pop; rock
- Length: 45:42
- Label: Chrysalis (Papillon)
- Producer: Kenny MacDonald; Ricky Ross

Deacon Blue chronology
Walking Back Home (1999)	Homesick (2001)	The Very Best of Deacon Blue (2001)

Homesick is a studio album by Scottish rock band Deacon Blue. Released in May 2001, it was the band's fifth studio album (or the sixth, counting the part-studio, part-compilation Walking Back Home released two years earlier). It includes the single "Everytime You Sleep", which reached No. 64 in the UK Singles Chart. Homesick was Deacon Blue's final album to feature guitarist Graeme Kelling, who died in 2004.

A promotional CD was made available to readers of The Daily Telegraph via a voucher appearing in the newspaper two weeks before the album's release date. This contained three tracks from the album ("Silverlake", "This Train Will Take You Anywhere", and "Homesick", the last in an exclusive acoustic mix), and three other tracks ("Away", "Wages Day", and "Dignity").

== Track listing ==
All tracks written by Ricky Ross, except where noted.

1. "Rae" (Ross, Prime, MacDonald) – 4:46
2. "Out There" – 3:46
3. "This Train Will Take You Anywhere" (Ross, Slaven) – 4:48
4. "Everytime You Sleep" – 4:06
5. "Now That You're Here" (Ross, Prime) – 4:00
6. "Silverlake" (Ross, Prime) – 4:36
7. "A is for Astronaut" – 3:03
8. "Beautifully Still" – 4:12
9. "Homesick" – 4:14
10. "Even Higher Ground" (Ross, Gary Clark) – 3:52
11. "I Am Born" – 4:22

== 2012 reissue ==
On 29 October 2012, Edsel Records released an expanded edition of the album, containing extra B-sides from the two singles and new lyrics, notes and photos from Ricky Ross. In the notes from Ross, he referred to it as "a record we should perhaps never have made".

No.	Title	Length
1.	"Rae"	4:46
2.	"Out There"	3:46
3.	"This Train Will Take You Anywhere"	4:48
4.	"Everytime You Sleep"	4:06
5.	"Now That You're Here"	4:00
6.	"Silverlake"	4:36
7.	"A Is for Astronaut"	3:03
8.	"Beautifully Still"	4:12
9.	"Homesick"	4:14
10.	"Even Higher Ground"	3:52
11.	"I Am Born"	4:22
12.	"Everytime You Sleep" (Radio Edit)	3:55
13.	"Hey Craig"	3:52
14.	"When You Were a Boy, You Were a Beautiful Boy"	4:16
15.	"Twist and Shout" (Live)
16.	"Cover from the Sky" (Live)
17.	"Peace and Jobs and Freedom" (Live)
18.	"Town to Be Blamed" (Live)

== Personnel ==
=== Deacon Blue ===
- Ricky Ross – vocals, keyboards, glockenspiel
- Lorraine McIntosh – vocals
- James Prime – keyboards, acoustic guitar, bass
- Ewen Vernal – bass, glockenspiel
- Graeme Kelling – guitar
- Dougie Vipond – drums

=== Additional personnel ===
- Mick Slaven – guitar on "Rae", "This Train Will Take You Anywhere", "A is for Astronaut", "Beautifully Still", "Homesick" and "I Am Born"
- Scott Frasier – guitar on "Out There"
- Davy Scott – guitar on "Everytime You Sleep"
- The Kick Horns – brass on "Now That You're Here"
- The Scottish BT Ensemble – strings on "Now That You're Here", "Homesick", "Even Higher Ground", and "I Am Born"
- Guliano Gizzi – guitar on "Silverlake"
- Jim MacDermott – drums on "A is for Astronaut", "Homesick" and "Even Higher Ground"
- Kenny MacDonald – drums on "Homesick"

== Charts ==
Chart (2001)	Peak position
UK Albums Chart	59
Scottish Albums Chart	23
