= Beautiful Love =

Beautiful Love may refer to:

- "Beautiful Love" (1931 song), a popular waltz
- "Beautiful Love" (Julian Cope song), 1991
- "Beautiful Love" (Justin Bieber song), for the mobile game Free Fire, 2022
- "Beautiful Love" (The Afters song), 2005
- Beautiful Love (film), a 1951 French drama film
