= Everytime You Sleep =

- Cover of CD single 1

Single by Deacon Blue

from the album Homesick
- B-side: "Hey Craig"; "When You Were a Boy You Were a Beautiful Boy"
- Released: 16 April 2001
- Recorded: October 1999
- Genre: Pop
- Length: 3:55
- Label: Chrysalis Records (Papillon)
- Songwriter(s): Ricky Ross
- Producer(s): Ricky Ross and Kenny MacDonald

Deacon Blue singles chronology
"Love Hurts" (1999)	"Everytime You Sleep" (2001)	"A is for Astronaut" (2001)

"Everytime You Sleep" is the first single from Deacon Blue's album Homesick. It reached number 64 on the UK Singles Chart in April 2001.

The first B-side on CD single 1 is "Hey Craig", a rock/alternative rock track. The other B-side is "When You Were a Boy You Were a Beautiful Boy", a pop track with the chorus sung by Lorraine McIntosh.

The CD single 2 contains live versions of "Twist and Shout" and "Cover from the Sky", both recorded at the BBC Radio Theater in November, 1999.

== Track listing ==
All songs written by Ricky Ross, except where noted:

CD single 1 (btflys0011)

1. "Everytime You Sleep (Radio Edit)" – 3:55
2. "Hey Craig" (Ross, Gary Glark) – 3:52
3. "When You Were a Boy You Were a Beautiful Boy" (Ross, Prime) – 4:16

CD single 2 (btflyx0011)

1. "Everytime You Sleep (Radio Edit)" – 3:55
2. "Twist and Shout (Live)" (Ross, Prime)
3. "Cover from the Sky (Live)" – 4:16

== Charts ==
Chart (2001)	Peak position
Scotland (OCC)	44
UK Singles (OCC)	64
UK Indie (OCC)	11
