= Closing Time (Deacon Blue song) =

1991 single by Deacon Blue

Single by Deacon Blue

from the album Fellow Hoodlums
- B-side: "I Was Like That"; "Friends of Billy Bear"; "Into the Good Night"
- Released: 30 September 1991
- Length: 4:19 (7-inch); 6:25 (12-inch)
- Label: Columbia
- Songwriter: Ricky Ross
- Producer: Jon Kelly

Deacon Blue singles chronology
"Twist and Shout" (1991)	"Closing Time" (1991)	"Cover from the Sky" (1991)

"Closing Time" is the third single from the album Fellow Hoodlums by Scottish rock band Deacon Blue. Released on 30 September 1991, it peaked at No. 42 on the UK Singles Chart.

Two of the three B-sides, "I Was Like That" and "Friends of Billy Bear", continue the style of "Fourteen Years" and "Faifley" on the "Your Swaying Arms" single, utilising raw music and low, gruff, and rambling spoken and sung vocals from Ricky Ross. The third B-side, "Into the Good Night", is a more traditional Deacon Blue song.

== Track listings ==
All songs were written by Ricky Ross except where noted.

7-inch and cassette single (657502 7; 657502 4)

1. "Closing Time" (7-inch version) – 4:19
2. "I Was Like That" (Ross, James Prime) – 4:30

12-inch single (657502 6)

1. "Closing Time" (extended version) – 6:25
2. "Friends of Billy Bear" – 2:32
3. "I Was Like That" (Ross, Prime) – 4:30
4. "Into the Good Night" – 3:40

CD single (657502 2)

1. "Closing Time" (7-inch version) – 4:19
2. "I Was Like That" (Ross, Prime) – 4:30
3. "Into the Good Night" – 3:40

== Charts ==
Chart (1991)	Peak position
Luxembourg (Radio Luxembourg)	12
UK Singles (OCC)	42
UK Airplay (Music Week)	23
