= Eve's Volcano (Covered in Sin) =

Single by Julian Cope

from the album Saint Julian
- B-side: "Almost Beautiful Child (I & II)"
- Released: 1987
- Genre: Neo-psychedelia
- Length: 2:50
- Label: Island
- Songwriter: Julian Cope
- Producer: Warne Livesey

Julian Cope singles chronology
"Trampolene" (1987)	"Eve's Volcano (Covered in Sin)" (1987)	"Charlotte Anne" (1988)

Professional ratings
Review scores
Source	Rating
Allmusic	3/5 stars

"Eve's Volcano (Covered in Sin)" is a song by the English singer-songwriter Julian Cope. It is the third and final single released in support of his album Saint Julian.

== Formats and track listing ==
All songs written by Julian Cope, except where noted.

UK 7" single (IS 318)

1. "Eve's Volcano (Covered in Sin)" – 3:50
2. "Almost Beautiful Child (I & II)" (De Harrison) – 5:23

UK 12" single (12 IS 318)

1. "Eve's Volcano (Covered in Sin)" – 3:50
2. "Almost Beautiful Child (I & II)" (De Harrison) – 5:23
3. "Pulsar N.X." [live] – 2:54
4. "Shot Down" [live] – 3:51

UK CD single (CID 318)

1. "Eve's Volcano (Covered in Sin)" – 3:50
2. "Almost Beautiful Child (I & II)" (De Harrison) – 5:23
3. "Pulsar N.X." [live] – 2:54
4. "Shot Down" [live] – 3:51
5. "Spacehopper — Annexe" – 4:51

UK 12" remix single (12 ISX 318)

1. "Eve's Volcano - !Volcano Lungo!" – 6:53
2. "Spacehopper — Annexe" – 4:51
3. "Almost Beautiful Child (I & II)" (De Harrison) – 5:23

== Chart positions ==
Chart (1987)	Peak position
UK Singles Chart	41
