= Safesurfer =

Single by Julian Cope

from the album Peggy Suicide
- B-side: "If You Loved Me at All"
- Released: 1991
- Genre: Neo-psychedelia
- Length: 8:07
- Label: Island
- Songwriter(s): Julian Cope
- Producer(s): Julian Cope

Julian Cope singles chronology
"Beautiful Love" (1991)	"Safesurfer" (1991)	"East Easy Rider" (1991)

"Safesurfer" is a song by the English singer-songwriter Julian Cope. It was released as a single in promotion of his 1991 tour for Peggy Suicide.

== Track listing ==
UK 7" single (JC 1)

1. "Safesurfer" (Cope) – 8:07
2. "If You Loved Me at All" (Cope, Skinner) – 5:00

== Accolades ==
Year	Publication	Country	Accolade	Rank
2004	Q	United Kingdom	"50 Epics You Must Own"	*
2004	Mojo	United Kingdom	"100 Epic Rock Tracks"	78
2010	Robert Dimery	United States	1001 Songs You Must Hear Before You Die	*
"*" denotes an unordered list.
