= When the World Knows Your Name =

Studio album by Deacon Blue
- Released: 3 April 1989
- Genre: Sophisti-pop
- Length: 50:33
- Label: Columbia
- Producers: Warne Livesey, Deacon Blue, David Kahne

Deacon Blue chronology
Raintown (1987)	When the World Knows Your Name (1989)	Ooh Las Vegas (1990)

Singles from When the World Knows Your Name
- 1. "Real Gone Kid" Released: 3 October 1988; 2. "Wages Day" Released: 20 February 1989; 3. "Fergus Sings the Blues" Released: May 1989; 4. "Love and Regret" Released: 4 September 1989; 5. "Queen of the New Year" Released: December 1989

Professional ratings
Review scores
Source	Rating
AllMusic	3/5 stars
Hi-Fi News & Record Review	B:2
Number One	4.5/5 stars

When the World Knows Your Name is the second studio album by the Scottish rock band Deacon Blue. It was released in 1989 and attained the number 1 chart position in the UK Albums Chart.

"Real Gone Kid" was the band's first Top 10 hit single in the UK Singles Chart, reaching No. 8 in October 1988. "Wages Day", "Fergus Sings the Blues", "Love and Regret" and "Queen of the New Year" also reached the top 30 in the same listing, and all five of the album's singles made the top 10 of the Irish Singles Chart.

Leslie Mathew at AllMusic noted "Deacon Blue isn't on the mark all the time. They have their failings, notably a tendency to get overly precious and self-indulgent when trying too hard to be impressionistic on the slower songs toward album's end. But when they get it right, like on "Queen of the New Year," "Wages Day," "Real Gone Kid," and "Fergus Sings the Blues," their driving melodies and hooks are fine compensation".

== Track listing ==
All songs written by Ricky Ross, except where noted:

1. "Queen of the New Year" (Ricky Ross, James Prime) – 3:36
2. "Wages Day" – 3:09
3. "Real Gone Kid" – 4:03
4. "Love and Regret" – 4:48
5. "Circus Lights" – 4:59
6. "This Changing Light" (Ricky Ross, James Prime) – 5:02
7. "Sad Loved Girl" – 1:11
8. "Fergus Sings the Blues" (Ricky Ross, James Prime) – 3:54
9. "The World Is Lit By Lightning" (Ricky Ross, James Prime) – 4:57
10. "Silhouette" – 3:18
11. "One Hundred Things" – 3:53
12. "Your Constant Heart" – 4:10
13. "Orphans" (Ricky Ross, Ewen Vernal) – 3:33

== 2012 reissue ==
On 22 October 2012, a deluxe remastered reissue of When the World Knows Your Name was released by Edsel Records, featuring two additional discs of bonus material as well as a DVD with bonus videos.

Disc 1
No.	Title	Length
1.	"Queen of the New Year"
2.	"Wages Day"
3.	"Real Gone Kid"
4.	"Love and Regret"
5.	"Circus Lights"
6.	"This Changing Light"
7.	"Sad Loved Girl"
8.	"Fergus Sings the Blues"
9.	"The World Is Lit By Lightning"
10.	"Silhouette"
11.	"One Hundred Things"
12.	"Your Constant Heart"
13.	"Orphans"
14.	"Real Gone Kid" (Extended 12" Version)
15.	"Little Lincoln"
16.	"Born Again"
17.	"It's Not Funny Anymore"
18.	"Wages Day" (Extended 12" Version)
19.	"Take Me to the Place"
20.	"Take the Saints Away"

Disc 2
No.	Title	Length
1.	"Trampolene"
2.	"Fergus Sings the Blues" (Extended 12" Version)
3.	"Long Window to Love"
4.	"London A-Z"
5.	"Back Here in Beanoland"
6.	"Love and Regret" (Extended 12" Version)
7.	"Down in the Flood"
8.	"Undeveloped Heart"
9.	"Love and Regret/It's All in the Game" (Live at Brighton Dome, 22 May 1989)
10.	"Spanish Moon/Down in the Flood" (Live at The Marquee, 20 November 1986)
11.	"Dark End of the Street" (Live at The Venue, Dee Why, Sydney, 18 July 1989)
12.	"When Will You (Make My Telephone Ring)?" (Live at The Venue, Dee Why, Sydney, 18 July 1989)
13.	"Down in the Flood" (Minimal Mix)

Disc 3
No.	Title	Length
1.	"Queen of the New Year" (Extended 12" Version)
2.	"My America"
3.	"Las Vegas"
4.	"Sad Loved Girl" (Long Version)
5.	"Circus Lights" (Acoustic Version)
6.	"Queen of the New Year" (Live at Glasgow SECC, 9 December 1989)
7.	"Chocolate Girl" (Live at The Point, Dublin, 3 December 1989)
8.	"Undeveloped Heart" (Live at Hammersmith Odeon, 25 May 1989)
9.	"Town to Be Blamed" (Live at Hammersmith Odeon, 25 May 1989)
10.	"Love You Say"
11.	"Let Your Hearts Be Troubled"
12.	"Is It Cold Beneath the Hill?"
13.	"Killing the Blues"
14.	"Gentle Teardrops"
15.	"That Country"
16.	"Christine"

DVD: Videos
No.	Title	Length
1.	"Real Gone Kid" (Version 1)
2.	"Real Gone Kid" (Version 2)
3.	"Wages Day" (Promo Video)
4.	"Fergus Sings the Blues" (Promo Video)
5.	"Love and Regret" (Promo Video)
6.	"Queen of the New Year" (Promo Video)

== Personnel ==
- Ricky Ross – vocals; keyboards on "Orphans"
- Lorraine McIntosh – vocals
- Graeme Kelling – guitars
- James Prime – keyboards
- Ewen Vernal – bass, keyboard bass
- Dougie Vipond – drums, percussion

Additional personnel

- Stuart Elliott — bodhrán on "Queen of the New Year"
- Gavin Wright — fiddle on "Queen of the New Year"
- Mark Feltham — harmonica on "Love and Regret" and "Your Constant Heart"
- Brass section on "Fergus Sings the Blues", arranged by James Prime and Warne Livesey:
  - Jamie Talbot — baritone saxophone
  - Dave Bishop — baritone saxophone
  - Chris White — tenor saxophone
  - Phil Todd — tenor saxophone
  - Neil Sidwell — tromobone
  - Pete Beachill — trombone
  - Guy Barker — trumpet
  - Simon Gardener — trumpet
