= Head (Julian Cope song) =

Song by the English singer-songwriter Julian Cope

Single by Julian Cope

from the album Peggy Suicide
- B-side: "Straw Dogs"/"Anyway At All"/"Bagged-Out Ken"
- Released: 1991
- Genre: Neo-psychedelia
- Length: 3:36
- Label: Island
- Songwriter(s): Julian Cope
- Producer(s): Donald Ross Skinner

Julian Cope singles chronology
"East Easy Rider" (1991)	"Head" (1991)	"Fear Loves This Place" (1992)

"Head" is a song by the English singer-songwriter Julian Cope. It is the third and final single released in support of his album Peggy Suicide.

== Chart positions ==
Chart (1991)	Peak position
UK Singles Chart	57
