= Sunshine Playroom =

Single by Julian Cope

from the album World Shut Your Mouth
- B-side: "High Class Butcher"
- Released: 1983
- Genre: Neo-psychedelia
- Length: 2:55
- Label: Mercury
- Songwriter(s): Julian Cope
- Producer(s): Steve Lovell

Julian Cope singles chronology
"Sunshine Playroom" (1983)	"The Greatness and Perfection of Love" (1984)

Professional ratings
Review scores
Source	Rating
Allmusic	4/5 stars

"Sunshine Playroom" is a song by the English singer-songwriter Julian Cope. It is his debut single released in support of his first solo album World Shut Your Mouth.

== Formats and track listing ==
All songs written by Julian Cope.

UK 7" single (COPE 1)

1. "Sunshine Playroom" – 2:55
2. "High Class Butcher" – 3:56

UK 12" single (COPE 112)

1. "Sunshine Playroom" – 2:55
2. "Wreck My Car" – 2:31
3. "High Class Butcher" – 3:56
4. "Eat the Poor" – 4:25

== Chart positions ==
Chart (1983)	Peak position
UK Singles Chart	64
