= Saint Julian (album) =

- Cover photography by Peter Ashworth

Studio album by Julian Cope
- Released: 2 March 1987
- Genre: Rock
- Length: 41:43
- Label: Island
- Producers: Warne Livesey, Ed Stasium

Julian Cope chronology
Fried (1984)	Saint Julian (1987)	My Nation Underground (1988)

Singles from Saint Julian
- 1. "World Shut Your Mouth" Released: 15 September 1986; 2. "Trampolene" Released: 1987; 3. "Eve's Volcano (Covered in Sin)" Released: 1987

Professional ratings
Review scores
Source	Rating
AllMusic	3.5/5 stars
BBC Music	favourable
Encyclopedia of Popular Music	3/5 stars
The Great Rock Discography	7/10
MusicHound	4/5
The Quietus	favourable
Record Collector	4/5 stars
The Rolling Stone Album Guide	4/5 stars
Smash Hits	9½/10
Uncut	3.5/5 stars

Saint Julian is the third solo album by Julian Cope. It has a very strong pop sound, compared to other Cope releases, and spawned several of his best known tracks (including "World Shut Your Mouth" and "Trampolene", which were both hit singles).

== Background ==
Saint Julian was the first album recorded under a new Cope deal with Island Records, following two poorly selling albums on the Mercury/Polygram label. Encouraged by his new manager Cally Callomon, Cope cleaned up and changed his image: cutting his hair, wearing rocker's leathers and embracing a "Rock God" perspective, as well as investing in a climbable microphone stand with integral steps.

To record and tour the album, Cope put together a new backing group, informally known as the "Two-Car Garage Band". This featured lead guitarist Donald Ross Skinner and former Waterboys drummer Chris Whitten (both of whom had played on Cope's previous album Fried), plus bass player James Eller (who'd played alongside Cope on the second Teardrop Explodes album, Wilder) and Cope himself on vocals and rhythm guitar. Cope played a red Gibson ES-335 12-string guitar strung with 9 strings (a single course of E, A and D strings, with the G, B and high E strings doubled) to get a fuller sound.

Also credited on the album was a keyboardist called Double DeHarrison. Promotional material of the era (which gave some background detail on each band member) indicated that DeHarrison was from Oregon, and had previously scored several "art sex" films and played in the late 1970s German group Tin Haus. In fact, Double DeHarrison was an alias for Cope himself, and both "Tin Haus" and the films DeHarrison was said to have scored were entirely fictitious. The distinctive electronic peal which punctuates "World Shut Your Mouth" is the start-up tone of Cope's main keyboard. Cope also used the DeHarrison pseudonym for the "Oregon guitar" playing on "A Crack in the Clouds" (the slow fingerpicked continuo) and would go on to use it again on subsequent solo albums. For live shows Richard Frost joined the band on keyboards, "replacing" DeHarrison.

The album's new songs abandoned the collapsing psychedelic styles of Fried in favour of a crisp, punchier and more structured sound, drawing partially on Cope's professed love for Detroit heavy rock acts such as early Alice Cooper. Several songs on the album originated from much earlier than the other - "Screaming Secrets" had been a Teardrop Explodes song which never made it to album, while "Spacehopper" may date back to late 1970s writing sessions with Ian McCulloch (although only Cope was credited as songwriter). Early sessions were supervised by Ramones producer Ed Stasium and delivered the song "World Shut Your Mouth" (which became Cope's biggest solo hit, reaching #19 in the UK in 1986), "Pulsar" and "Spacehopper". The remaining album sessions were produced by Warne Livesey.

Saint Julian was well received and generated two more singles, "Trampolene" and "Eve’s Volcano". However, the project momentum did not last. Cope fell out with Callomon, and the Two-Car Garage band disintegrated when James Eller joined The The and Chris Whitten left for Paul McCartney’s band. Cope has subsequently described Saint Julian as not being one of his favourite albums, although he acknowledges that "it has its moments."

== Track listing ==
All tracks are written by Julian Cope, except where noted.

Side one
No.	Title	Length
1.	"Trampolene"	3:33
2.	"Shot Down"	3:35
3.	"Eve's Volcano (Covered in Sin)"	4:16
4.	"Spacehopper"	3:59
5.	"Planet Ride"	5:42

Side two
No.	Title	Length
6.	"World Shut Your Mouth"	3:34
7.	"Saint Julian"	3:20
8.	"Pulsar"	2:46
9.	"Screaming Secrets"	3:27
10.	"A Crack in the Clouds"	7:59

The above is the original UK track listing. For the US release, "World Shut Your Mouth" was placed at the beginning of the album, and "Spacehopper" moved to the slot between "Saint Julian" and "Pulsar".

=== 2013 expanded edition ===
The first disc of the expanded edition contains the ten tracks from the original album. The tracks on the second disc were previously released as b-sides and extended remixes on 7-inch and 12-inch singles from Saint Julian.

Disc two
No.	Title	Writer(s)	Length
1.	"I've Got Levitation"	Tommy Hall, Stacy Sutherland	3:02
2.	"Umpteenth Unnatural Blues"		3:00
3.	"Disaster"		5:00
4.	"Warwick the Kingmaker"		3:54
5.	"Non-Alignment Pact"	Tom Herman, Scott Krauss, Tony Maimone, Allen Ravenstine, David Thomas	2:51
6.	"Mock Turtle"		4:26
7.	"Almost Beautiful Child (1 And 2)"		5:25
8.	"Transporting"	Cope, James Eller, Donald Ross Skinner, Chris Whitten	3:36
9.	"Trampolene (Warne Out Mix)"		5:57
10.	"World Shut Your Mouth (Trouble Funk Mix)"		4:36
11.	"Pulsar Nx (Live)" (Recorded live at Westminster Central Hall, London, January 1987.)		2:54
12.	"Shot Down (Live)" (Recorded live at Westminster Central Hall, London, January 1987.)		3:53
13.	"Eve's Volcano (Covered In Sin)/Vulcano Lungo (12" Remix)"		6:49
14.	"Spacehopper (Annexe)"		4:55

Note

"I've Got Levitation" was originally recorded by The 13th Floor Elevators and "Non-Alignment Pact" by Pere Ubu.

== Charts ==
Chart (1987)	Peak position
Australia (Kent Music Report)	90
Swedish Albums Chart	39
New Zealand Albums Chart	25
UK Albums Chart	11
US Billboard 200	105

== Album cover ==
The album's cover was shot by English photographer Peter Ashworth, who said of the shoot, "The pose for the album cover was standing with his arms outstretched, as if being crucified. It was freezing. One of the coldest nights of the year. It took many hours for me and Bruno Tilley, the art director, to light the entire space with heavy duty parcan lights running from a generator truck just out of sight." It’s believed the photo’s location was a scrap yard near Tamworth.

== Personnel ==
- Julian Cope – vocals, 9-string rhythm guitar; (also performs pseudonymously as "Double DeHarrison" playing organ and Hohner Clavinet on most tracks and 'Oregon' guitar on "A Crack in the Clouds")
- Donald Ross Skinner – electric & slide guitars, 'airhead' guitar & screams on "Spacehopper"
- James Eller – bass guitar
- Chris Whitten – drums
- Warne Livesey – synthesizer, strings on "A Crack in the Clouds"
- Paul Crockford – Ace Tone organ on "Planet Ride"
- Richard Frost (credited as "Keith-Richard Frost") – string machine on "Saint Julian"
- Kate St. John – cor anglais on "Saint Julian" & "A Crack in the Clouds"
- Dee Lewis, Tessa Niles – chorus vocals on "Eve's Volcano", chorus agreement vocals on "Planet Ride"

Some sources, including a press release for his former band How We Live, say that future Marillion singer Steve Hogarth sang backing vocals on the album, although he is uncredited on the inlay.

Technical

- Warne Livesey - production on "Trampolene", "Eve's Volcano", "Planet Ride", "Saint Julian", "Pulsar", "Screaming Secrets", "A Crack in the Clouds"
- Ed Stasium - production on "Shot Down", "Spacehopper", "World Shut Your Mouth"
- Felix Kendall - recorded by
- George Schilling - recorded by
- P. St. John Nettleton, Island Art - sleeve design
- Peter Ashworth - cover photography
- Lawrence Watson - inner photography

Expanded edition disc 2

Production credits adapted from the original 7-inch and 12-inch releases.

- Julian Cope - production on "I've Got Levitation", "Umpteenth Unnatural Blues", "Warwick the Kingmaker", "Non-Alignment Pact", "Almost Beautiful Child (1 & 2)", "Transporting"; (credited pseudonymously as "Double De Harrison" on some tracks)
- Julian Cope & Donald Ross Skinner - production on "Disaster", "Mock Turtle"
- Tim Lewis and the group - production on "Pulsar Nx (Live)", "Shot Down (Live)"
- Warne Livesey - remix on "Trampolene (Warne Out Mix)"
- James Avery, Robert Reed - remix on "World Shut Your Mouth (Trouble Funk Mix)"
- Tom Lord-Alge - remix on "Eve's Volcano (Covered In Sin)/Vulcano Lungo (12" Remix)"
