= Sunspots (song) =

1985 single by Julian Cope

Single by Julian Cope

from the album Fried
- B-side: "I Went on a Chourney"
- Released: 1985
- Genre: Neo-psychedelia
- Length: 5:14
- Label: Mercury
- Songwriter(s): Julian Cope
- Producer(s): Steve Lovell

Julian Cope singles chronology
"The Greatness and Perfection of Love" (1984)	"Sunspots" (1985)	"World Shut Your Mouth" (1986)

"Sunspots" is a song by the English singer-songwriter Julian Cope. It is the only single released in support of his second album Fried.

== Formats and track listing ==
All songs written by Julian Cope.

UK 7" single (MER 182)

1. "Sunspots" – 5:14
2. "I Went on a Chourney" – 2:28

UK double 7" single (MER 1822)

1. "Sunspots" – 5:14
2. "I Went on a Chourney" – 2:28
3. "Mik Mak Mok" – 4:47
4. "Land of Fear" – 5:10

== Personnel ==
- Julian Cope – vocals, bass guitar, rhythm guitar, piano, organ
- Steve Lovell – electric guitar, recorder solo
- Donald Ross Skinner – slide and electric guitar
- Chris Whitten – drums
- Steve "Brother Johnno" Johnson – electric guitar solo
- Kate St. John – oboe
- David Carter – tuba on

Technical

- Paul King – production supervisor
- Paul "Chas" Watkins – engineer, recorded by
- P. St. John Nettleton – art direction, design
- Donato Cinicolo – photography

== Accolades ==
Year	Publication	Country	Accolade	Rank
1985	Rockerilla	Italy	Singles of the Year	14
2006	Blow Up	Italy	100 Songs to Remember	7

== Chart positions ==
Chart (1985)	Peak position
UK Singles Chart	76
