= World Shut Your Mouth (album) =

Studio album by Julian Cope
- Released: 17 February 1984
- Studio: The Point Studio, Victoria, London
- Genre: Neo-psychedelia; psychedelic pop
- Length: 40:41
- Label: Mercury
- Producer: Steve Lovell

Julian Cope chronology
World Shut Your Mouth (1984)	Fried (1984)

Singles from World Shut Your Mouth
- 1. "Sunshine Playroom" Released: 11 November 1983; 2. "The Greatness and Perfection of Love" Released: 5 March 1984

Professional ratings
Review scores
Source	Rating
AllMusic	3.5/5 stars
Encyclopedia of Popular Music	4/5 stars
The Great Rock Discography	7/10
MusicHound	3/5
Q	4/5 stars
Record Mirror	4.5/5 stars
The Rolling Stone Album Guide	3/5 stars
Select	5/5
Sounds	3/5 stars

World Shut Your Mouth is the debut solo album by Julian Cope, released on 17 February 1984.

== Background ==
World Shut Your Mouth was written during Cope's 1983 retreat to the village of Drayton Bassett in Staffordshire (close to his childhood home of Tamworth), following the breakup of Cope's former band The Teardrop Explodes. Two of the tracks, "Metranil Vavin" and "Pussyface", had in fact been originally intended for The Teardrop Explodes (and different versions of each appear on the belated 1990 release of the band's scrapped third album, Everybody Wants to Shag... The Teardrop Explodes).

Although World Shut Your Mouth generally retained the uptempo pop drive of The Teardrop Explodes, it was also an introspective and surreal work. Cope had spent a period in seclusion in which he recovered from the strain of the final year of the Teardrops and from his LSD excesses of the times. During this period, he had also amassed a huge collection of vintage toys. His eccentric behaviour both during and post-Teardrops had led to him being labelled by the music media as an "acid casualty" in the vein of Syd Barrett and Roky Erickson, an image which would take him several years to shake off. Cope's contemporary vulnerability and childhood preoccupations informed the songs on the album, most notably on songs like "Head Hang Low" and "Sunshine Playroom". Most of the album's tracks featured former Teardrops drummer Gary Dwyer, and other contributors included lead guitarist/producer Steve Lovell (ex-Blitz Brothers), late-period Teardrops bass guitarist Ronnie François and the Dream Academy oboist Kate St. John. It was recorded at The Point Studio in Victoria, London, and engineered by Alex Burak.

World Shut Your Mouth was released on Mercury Records in March 1984, but was seen by critics as somewhat pastoral and out-of-step with the times. It gained poor reviews and sold indifferently. The album's first single "Sunshine Playroom" featured a macabre and disturbing video directed by David Bailey. Both this and the up-tempo follow-up single, "Greatness and Perfection of Love" also flopped.

The album's title was later reused by Cope for another song, which became a hit single in 1986 (and was also taken for the title of a Dom Joly TV show).

== Track listing ==
All tracks are written by Julian Cope.

No.	Title	Length
1.	"Bandy's First Jump"	2:50
2.	"Metranil Vavin"	3:00
3.	"Strasbourg"	2:25
4.	"An Elegant Chaos"	4:03
5.	"Quizmaster"	2:56
6.	"Kolly Kibber's Birthday"	5:14
7.	"Sunshine Playroom"	2:55
8.	"Head Hang Low"	5:04
9.	"Pussyface"	4:11
10.	"Greatness and Perfection"	3:16
11.	"Lunatic and Fire-Pistol"	4:30

1996 reissue bonus tracks
No.	Title	Length
12.	"Wreck My Car" (Single B-side)	2:31
13.	"High Class Butcher" (Single B-side)	3:56
14.	"Eat the Poor" (Single B-side)	4:25

=== 2015 expanded edition ===
The first disc of the expanded edition contains the eleven tracks from the original album.

Disc two
No.	Title	Length
1.	"Wreck My Car"	2:31
2.	"High Class Butcher"	3:56
3.	"Eat the Poor"	4:25
4.	"Greatness and Perfection" (Remixed version)	3:26
5.	"24a Velocity Crescent" (Single B-side)	3:48
6.	"Pussyface" (Single B-side)	5:58
7.	"Head Hang Low" (John Peel session 05/02/1983)	4:10
8.	"Lunatic and Fire-Pistol" (John Peel session 05/02/1983)	4:25
9.	"High Class Butcher" (John Peel session 05/02/1983)	4:06
10.	"Greatness and Perfection" (John Peel session 05/02/1983)	3:23
11.	"Reynard the Fox" (David Jensen session 05/01/1984)	3:27
12.	"O King of Chaos" (David Jensen session 05/01/1984)	2:19
13.	"Laughing Boy" (David Jensen session 05/01/1984)	5:28

== Charts ==
Chart (1984)	Peak position
UK Albums Chart	40

== Personnel ==
- Julian Cope - vocals, rhythm guitar, bass guitar, organ, piano, drum machine
- Steve Lovell - lead guitar, sitar, producer
- Kate St. John - oboe
- Gary Dwyer - drums
- Ronnie François - bass on "Sunshine Playroom" and "Pussyface"
- Stephen Creese - drums on "Sunshine Playroom", "Pussyface" and "Greatness and Perfection"
- Andrew Edge - drums on "Lunatic and Fire-Pistol"

Technical

- Alex Burak - engineer
- Phil Thornalley - engineer
- Stephen Power - engineer
- Anton Corbijn - photography
- Julian Cope and Julian Balme - design
- Richard Smith - liner notes (1996 re-issue)
