= Peggy Suicide =

Studio album by Julian Cope
- Released: 22 April 1991
- Recorded: 1990
- Genres: Art rock, psychedelic rock
- Length: 75:44
- Label: Island
- Producers: Julian Cope, Donald Ross Skinner

Julian Cope chronology
| Droolian (1990) | Peggy Suicide (1991) | Jehovahkill (1992) |

Singles from Peggy Suicide
- 1. "Beautiful Love" Released: 1991; 2. "Safesurfer" Released: 1991; 3. "East Easy Rider" Released: 1991; 4. "Head" Released: 1991

Professional ratings
Review scores
| Source | Rating |
|---|---|
| AllMusic | 4.5/5 stars |
| Encyclopedia of Popular Music | 4/5 stars |
| The Great Rock Discography | 8/10 |
| NME | 8/10 |
| Q | 4/5 stars |
| Record Collector | 5/5 stars |
| The Rolling Stone Album Guide | 3.5/5 stars |
| Select | 5/5 |
| Sounds | 4/5 stars |
| Uncut | 4.5/5 stars |

Peggy Suicide is the seventh album by Julian Cope. It is generally seen as the beginning of Cope's trademark sound and approach, and as a turning-point for Cope as a maturing artist.

== Background ==
Peggy Suicide was recorded and released following two lo-fi Cope albums - Skellington and Droolian - which had not gained official distribution and caused friction with Cope's label Island Records. Cope's previous Island release, My Nation Underground, had not satisfied him, and he had rejected its heavily produced, pop-friendly sound in favour of a one-take, more politicised approach as expounded by former White Panther John Sinclair in his book Guitar Army. Cope was later to refer to this book as "my holy book", and it set the method for all of his subsequent recording. Several familiar Cope collaborators were on the record - multi-instrumentalist Donald Ross Skinner, drummer/percussionist Rooster Cosby and keyboard player/onetime Cope producer Ron Fair. There were also contributions by new associates in the shape of former Smiths drummer Mike Joyce and future Spiritualized lead guitarist Michael Watts (better known as Mike Mooney or "Moon-eye").

On the album's songs, Cope laid bare many of his personal convictions including his hatred of organized religion and his increasing public interest in women's rights, the occult, alternative spirituality (including paganism and Goddess worship), animal rights, and ecology. He had referred in passing to these beliefs in previous songs, but never so directly. The album was written in the aftermath of the British anti-poll tax riots in 1990. Cope had taken part in the protest, and several songs on the album refer directly to its events. Cope's forthright new political stance was reflected in the song "Leperskin", which refers to the contemporary British prime minister Margaret Thatcher (who resigned between the recording of Peggy Suicide and its release) as an "apostolic hag". For one particular track, the anti-police tirade "Soldier Blue", Cope sampled Lenny Bruce's live album The Berkeley Concert and mixed in samples of the Poll Tax Riot.

When released in 1991, the album featured extensive sleevenotes in which Cope explained the meaning of each song and stated that the entire album was a meditation on humanity's relationship to Mother Earth. Many songs were given very idiosyncratic interpretations, such as Cope's account of "You" which asserts that the Conscious Mind "acts like a cross between Tony Wilson and Bill Drummond but looks a lot like Lew Grade. The Unconscious mind...looks like Iggy Pop playing Syd Barrett."

Peggy Suicide generated two singles - the calypso-styled "Beautiful Love" (a minor hit) and "East Easy Rider". Another track, "Soldier Blue", was re-mixed by The Disposable Heroes of Hiphoprisy's Michael Franti, who also provided a rap for the new mix. However, Island Records refused to release the song as a single due to it being considered too overtly political.

The album was heralded by critics as Cope's best work thus far, and has subsequently been considered an artistic rebirth for Cope. Paul Davies in Q Magazine described it as "a hugely diverse and enjoyable collection." In 2009, a deluxe edition was released with a second CD of bonus tracks.

The album's title is a pun on the Buddy Holly song "Peggy Sue".

=== Runtime ===
Head was edited to fit on the limited time of LP and CD mediums for the album. The original unabridged version was later made available on the Head EP for the song and credited as a remix version.

The Double LP album features slightly longer versions of the tracks "Safesurfer" (8.35), "Drive, She Said" (5.05) & "Not Raving But Drowning" (4.41), plus an extra track "Uptight" on the D side of the release.

== Music ==
Peggy Suicide incorporates elements of funk and noise music.

== Reception and legacy ==
Ned Raggett of AllMusic said Peggy Suicide was Cope's best release to date, calling it "an absolute, stone-cold rock classic, full stop."

== Track listing ==
All tracks are written by Julian Cope, except where noted.

| No. | Title | Writer(s) | Length |
|---|---|---|---|
| 1. | "Pristeen" | | 4:43 |
| 2. | "Double Vegetation" | | 3:52 |
| 3. | "East Easy Rider" | | 4:00 |
| 4. | "Promised Land" | | 3:40 |
| 5. | "Hanging Out & Hung Up on the Line" | | 4:44 |
| 6. | "Safesurfer" | | 8:07 |
| 7. | "If You Loved Me at All" | Cope, Donald Ross Skinner | 5:00 |
| 8. | "Drive, She Said" | | 4:37 |
| 9. | "Soldier Blue" | Cope, Skinner | 4:49 |
| 10. | "You..." | | 1:49 |
| 11. | "Not Raving But Drowning" | Cope, Skinner | 4:17 |
| 12. | "Head" | | 2:21 |
| 13. | "Leperskin" | Cope, Skinner | 5:12 |
| 14. | "Beautiful Love" | | 3:13 |
| 15. | "Western Front 1992 CE" | | 2:01 |
| 16. | "Hung Up & Hanging Out to Dry" | Cope, Skinner, Double DeHarrison, J.D. Hassinger | 4:48 |
| 17. | "The American Lite" | Cope, Skinner | 4:03 |
| 18. | "Las Vegas Basement" | | 5:04 |

2009 deluxe edition disc 2
| No. | Title | Writer(s) | Length |
|---|---|---|---|
| 1. | "Easty Risin' (East Easy Rider remix)" | | 8:23 |
| 2. | "Ravebury Stones" | Cope, Skinner | 11:34 |
| 3. | "Love L.U.V. (Beautiful Love remix)" | | 6:53 |
| 4. | "Dragonfly" | | 9:18 |
| 5. | "Heed: Of Penetration and the City Dwellers (Head remix)" | | 6:12 |
| 6. | "Bring Cherhill Down (vocal)" | Cope, Skinner | 6:58 |
| 7. | "Safesurfer (tour '91 7" version)" | | 7:01 |
| 8. | "If You Loved Me at All (tour '91 7" version)" | Cope, Skinner | 6:30 |
| 9. | "Butterfly E" | | 6:37 |
| 10. | "Straw Dogs" | Cope, Skinner | 5:32 |
| 11. | "Anyway at All" | | 3:54 |

== Charts ==
| Chart (1991) | Peak position |
|---|---|
| Australian Albums (ARIA) | 134 |
| UK Albums Chart | 23 |

== Accolades ==
The album was included in the book 1001 Albums You Must Hear Before You Die.

== Personnel ==
- Julian Cope (also credited as "DeHarrison" or "Double DeHarrison") - vocals, acoustic & electric guitar, bass guitar, Moog synthesizer, string synthesizer, string arrangements
- Donald Ross Skinner - bass guitar, electric guitar, keyboards, organ, piano, drums on "You..." & "Hung Up & Hanging Out to Dry"
- Mark "Rooster" Cosby - drums, percussion, congas
- J.D. Hassinger - electronic and acoustic drums, tambourine
- Michael "Moon-Eye" Watts - electric guitar on "Double Vegetation", "East Easy Rider" & "Safesurfer"
- Mike Joyce - drums on "Hanging Out & Hung Up on the Line", "Drive, She Said" & "Las Vegas Basement"
- Tim Bran - Hammond organ on "East Easy Rider"
- Ron Fair - piano on "Safesurfer"
- Dan Levett - cello on "Safesurfer"
- Ronnie Ross - baritone saxophone on "You..."
- Gorby Scott Butterworth - Moog synthesizer on "Beautiful Love"
- Aaf Verkade - trumpet on "Beautiful Love"
- Lulu Chivers, Edwina Vernon, Camilla Mayer - vocals on "Western Front 1992 CE"
- The William Stukeley Quintet - strings on "Hung Up & Hanging Out to Dry"

Technical personnel

- Donald Ross Skinner - producer
- Julian Cope - producer on "Safesurfer", "Western Front 1992 CE" & "Las Vegas Basement"
- Hugo Nicolson - recording engineer, mixing engineer, producer on "Uptight"
- Ingmar Kiang - recording engineer
- Tim Bran - recording engineer
- Tony Harris - recording engineer
- Paul Tipler - recording engineer
- Darina Roche - cover painting
- Richard Haughton - photography
- Darren Woolford - cover design
