= East Easy Rider =

Single by Julian Cope

from the album Peggy Suicide
- B-side: "Butterfly E"/"Almost Alive"/"Little Donkey"
- Released: 1991
- Genre: Neo-psychedelia
- Length: 3:38
- Label: Island
- Songwriter(s): Julian Cope
- Producer(s): Donald Ross Skinner

Julian Cope singles chronology
"Safesurfer" (1991)	"East Easy Rider" (1991)	"Head" (1991)

"East Easy Rider" is a song by the English singer-songwriter Julian Cope. It is the second single released in support of his album Peggy Suicide.

== Chart positions ==
Chart (1991)	Peak position
UK Singles Chart	51
U.S. Billboard Modern Rock Tracks	25
