= The Greatness and Perfection of Love =

Single by Julian Cope

from the album World Shut Your Mouth
- B-side: "24a Velocity Crescent"
- Released: 1984
- Genre: Neo-psychedelia
- Length: 3:16
- Label: Mercury
- Songwriter(s): Julian Cope
- Producer(s): Stephen Lipson, Steve Lovell, Phil Thornalley

Julian Cope singles chronology
"Sunshine Playroom" (1983)	"The Greatness and Perfection of Love" (1984)	"Sunspots" (1985)

"The Greatness and Perfection of Love" is a song by the English singer-songwriter Julian Cope. It is the second single released in support of his first album World Shut Your Mouth. The album version of the song is simply titled "Greatness and Perfection".

== Formats and track listing ==
All songs written by Julian Cope.

UK 7" single (MER 155)

1. "The Greatness and Perfection of Love" [remix]
2. "24a Velocity Crescent"

UK 12" single (MERX 155)

1. "The Greatness and Perfection of Love" [remix]
2. "24a Velocity Crescent"
3. "Pussyface"

== Chart positions ==
Chart (1984)	Peak position
UK Singles Chart	52
