= Droolian =

Studio album by Julian Cope
- Released: 1990
- Genre: Neo-psychedelia
- Length: 32:25
- Label: Zippo
- Producer: Donald Ross Skinner

Julian Cope chronology
Skellington (1990)	Droolian (1990)	Peggy Suicide (1991)

Professional ratings
Review scores
Source	Rating
AllMusic	4.5/5 stars
The Encyclopedia of Popular Music	2/5 stars

Droolian is the sixth album by Julian Cope, released in 1990.

== Background ==
Droolian was recorded against the background of Cope's disagreement with Island Records, the record label to which he was contracted at the time. During this time, Cope was discovering that the recordings he made on a low-budget, one-take approach were more pleasing to him than the slicker, densely produced recordings which Island favoured. He had already recorded and released a lo-fi album – Skellington – which had led to problems with Island.

Following a similar recording ethic Droolian was recorded over a three-day period, on a 4-track portastudio set up in the Liverpool living room of Cope's old friend and former Zoo Records cohort Pam "Pammo" Young. Mastered from two used C90 cassettes, the record was cut at 45 rpm. It was initially released in May 1990 in Texas only, as a fund-raising item to contribute towards the legal fees of one of Cope's heroes, the former 13th Floor Elevators frontman Roky Erickson.

The album's front cover features Cope's Miniature Schnauzer, Smelvin.

== Track listing ==
All tracks are written by Julian Cope.

No.	Title	Length
1.	"Sqwubbsy"	3:13
2.	"Look After Your Leathers"	3:35
3.	"Unisex Cathedral"	2:30
4.	"Commin' Down..."	2:05
5.	"Safe Surfer"	2:03
6.	"Yeah Yeah Yeah"	2:40
7.	"Jellypop Perky Jean"	2:08
8.	"When Will I Get to Hold You"	1:39
9.	"Louis 14th"	4:31
10.	""...Atonement of Wasp""	1:39
11.	"Gentleman Dude"	1:47
12.	"Kelly..."	3:36
13.	"Church of England 1991..."	0:59

== Personnel ==
- Julian Cope
- Donald Ross Skinner
