= China Doll (Julian Cope song) =

Single by Julian Cope

from the album My Nation Underground
- B-side: "Crazy Farm Animal"/"Rail On"/"Desi"
- Released: 1989
- Genre: Neo-psychedelia
- Length: 3:28
- Label: Island
- Songwriter: Julian Cope
- Producer: Ron Fair

Julian Cope singles chronology
"5 O'Clock World" (1988)	"China Doll" (1989)	"Beautiful Love" (1991)

"China Doll" is a song by the English singer-songwriter Julian Cope. Veteran bass sessionist Danny Thompson plays double bass on the track. It is the third and final single released in support of his album My Nation Underground. Pete de Freitas of Echo & the Bunnymen starred in the music video for the track.

The China Doll e.p. includes four tracks - see sidebar.

== Chart positions ==
Chart (1989)	Peak position
UK Singles Chart	53
