= My Nation Underground =

Studio album by Julian Cope
- Released: October 1988
- Recorded: Summer 1988
- Genre: Alternative rock
- Length: 39:36
- Label: Island
- Producer: Ron Fair

Julian Cope chronology
Saint Julian (1987)	My Nation Underground (1988)	Skellington (1989)

Singles from My Nation Underground
- 1. "Charlotte Anne" Released: 1988; 2. "5 O'Clock World" Released: 1988; 3. "China Doll" Released: 1988

Professional ratings
Review scores
Source	Rating
AllMusic	2/5 stars
Encyclopedia of Popular Music	2/5 stars
The Great Rock Discography	8/10
MusicHound	3.5/5
NME	7/10
Record Collector	3/5 stars
Record Mirror	4/5
The Rolling Stone Album Guide	3.5/5 stars
Select	1/5

My Nation Underground is the fourth solo album by Julian Cope. It produced three singles including "Charlotte Anne" (which reached number 35 in the UK charts in September 1988 and was also Cope's only song to reach any position on the US charts).

The album's music is an extension of the more commercial side of Cope's songwriting, following on from the relative commercial and organisational success of its predecessor Saint Julian. However, Cope himself has all but disowned My Nation Underground, considering it an artistic mis-step which failed to produce the music which he wanted (although he has also accepted responsibility for the failure). Critical consensus on the album generally supports this view.

== Background ==
My Nation Underground was the follow-up to Cope’s relatively successful Saint Julian album of 1987, which had seen him move from raw psychedelic rock to a more streamlined and solid hard-rock approach built around the tight five-piece "Two-Car Garage" band. The band disintegrated after the Saint Julian promotional tour, leaving only Cope and his musical right-hand man, guitarist/multi-instrumentalist Donald Ross Skinner. As Island Records were expecting a new album, Cope enlisted his A&R man Ron Fair as producer and began recording.

With the band dispersed, Skinner began to play drums, keyboards and harmonica in addition to guitar, while Cope continued to play guitar and keyboards. The other members of the core team were Fair on keyboards plus eccentric percussionist Rooster Cosby (who’d remain a close Cope associate). Other contributors included the Two-Car Garage Band bass guitarist James Eller (returning briefly - and sheepishly - as a session player), ABC/The The drummer David Palmer, revered double bass player Danny Thompson and various session singers.

While the main influence on Saint Julian had been Detroit hard rock, by the time Cope came to record My Nation Underground he was favouring Funkadelic as an influence. This had a demonstrable effect on the album’s title track as well as others such as "The Great White Hoax". The album also reflected Cope’s longtime fascination with West Coast psychedelic bands like The 13th Floor Elevators and The Seeds, although the album also featured the Walker Brothers-styled ballad "China Doll". For the first time, Cope recorded cover versions: "5 O'Clock World" (originally a 1965 Vogues song for which Cope reworked the lyrics and added the bridge of the Petula Clark song "I Know a Place") and a hard rocking version of the Shadows of Knight song "Someone Like Me". Cope also co-wrote two songs with Skinner, "Easter Everywhere" and "I’m Not Losing Sleep". Lyrical subject matter included false gurus (the single "Charlotte Anne", punning on "charlatan"), domestic violence, and an apocalyptic re-imagining of the worldview of the serial killer Dennis Nilsen.

My Nation Underground produced only one Top 40 single, "Charlotte Anne", which also met with modest American success by reaching the top of the Modern Rock Tracks. Subsequent singles "5 O'Clock World" and the orchestral pop ballad "China Doll" both charted considerably lower, disappointing Island Records and further discouraging Cope, who had not enjoyed making the record and did not believe that it represented him properly as an artist. Cope has repeatedly referred to it as his least-favourite among his albums, commenting that it was "just me figuring I ought to do another album and not feeling sure of what I wanted to do. That was a bad time. A bad album… "Charlotte Anne" is a good song, but one good song is not enough. Perhaps it was a coherent album, but it was nothing like what I had inside me. I couldn't put it out, I just could not get it out. If (anyone) think(s) it's even halfway decent then I'm pleased 'cause I was trying, blasting my mind apart."

== Track listing ==
All tracks are written by Julian Cope, except where noted.

No.	Title	Writer(s)	Length
1.	"5 O'Clock World"	Allen Reynolds; Tony Hatch excerpts from "I Know a Place"; lyrics updated by Julian Cope	3:45
2.	"Vegetation"		3:55
3.	"Charlotte Anne"		4:56
4.	"My Nation Underground"		7:15
5.	"China Doll"		4:14
6.	"Someone Like Me"	Rick Novak, David MacDowell, Harry Pye	2:10
7.	"Easter Everywhere"	Cope, Donald Ross Skinner	2:38
8.	"I'm Not Losing Sleep"	Cope, Donald Ross Skinner	4:35
9.	"The Great White Hoax"		6:06

== Charts ==
Chart (1988)	Peak position
Australian Albums (ARIA)	120
UK Albums Chart	42
US Billboard 200	155

== Personnel ==
- Julian Cope - lead & backing vocals, keyboards, guitar (including "wailing guitar" on "5 O'Clock World"); (also performs pseudonymously as "Double DeHarrison" playing organ plus the Minimoog synthesizer wah-bass line on "The Great White Hoax")
- Donald Ross Skinner - electric guitar, Hohner Clavinet, piano, Minimoog synthesizer bass, drums (including right-channel drums on "5 O'Clock World"), harmonica, tenor saxophone on "I'm Not Losing Sleep", backing vocals
- Mark "Rooster" Cosby - percussion, bongos on "Easter Everywhere"
- Ron Fair - vibraphone, piano, organ (including "5 O'Clock World"), string & brass arrangements & conducting, tuned percussion on "I'm Not Losing Sleep",
- James Eller - bass guitar (on some tracks)
- Danny Thompson - double bass on "China Doll"
- David Palmer (credited as "Friendship Dave Palmer") - drums
- Richard Frost (credited as "Keith-Richard Frost ") - "raw and alive" (possibly a reference to Frost's role as live keyboard player in Cope's band)
- Carol Kenyon, Tessa Nile (credited as "Tess of the Nile"), Paul Lee, Derek Green, Gladstone Cleaver, Michael Christ, Bobby Carr, Camilla DeHarrison - backing vocals

Technical

- Hugh Padgham - mixing

Arrangements by Julian Cope/Donald Ross Skinner/Ron Fair
