= Fellow Hoodlums =

Studio album by Deacon Blue
- Released: 3 June 1991
- Recorded: July 1989 – May 1990
- Genres: Pop, soul, blues
- Length: 48:43
- Label: Columbia
- Producer: Jon Kelly

Deacon Blue chronology
Ooh Las Vegas (1990)	Fellow Hoodlums (1991)	Whatever You Say, Say Nothing (1993)

Singles from Fellow Hoodlums
- 1. "Your Swaying Arms" Released: May 1991; 2. "Twist and Shout" Released: 15 July 1991; 3. "Closing Time" Released: 30 September 1991; 4. "Cover from the Sky" Released: 2 December 1991

Alternate Cover
- Cover of US release

Professional ratings
Review scores
Source	Rating
AllMusic	3/5 stars
The Encyclopedia of Popular Music	3/5 stars
MusicHound Rock: The Essential Album Guide	3.5/5 stars
The Rolling Stone Album Guide	4/5 stars

Fellow Hoodlums is the third studio album by the Scottish rock band Deacon Blue, released in 1991. It includes four singles: "Your Swaying Arms", the Top 10 hit "Twist and Shout", "Closing Time" and "Cover from the Sky".

It reached No. 2 in the UK Albums Chart in 1991, spending over six months in the listing.

== Critical reception ==
The Washington Post wrote: "Unfortunately, no visceral emotions come through the music -- the singing is too bland, the playing is too safe and the sentiments are too predictable. The result is the kind of middle-brow artsiness favored by Sting and Joe Jackson; the listener can believe that something serious is going on without actually being challenged in any way."

== Track listing ==
All songs written by Ricky Ross, except where noted:

1. "James Joyce Soles" – 3:50
2. "Fellow Hoodlums" – 3:20
3. "Your Swaying Arms" – 4:10
4. "Cover from the Sky" – 3:34
5. "The Day that Jackie Jumped the Jail" – 3:42
6. "The Wildness" (Ross, Prime) – 5:42
7. "A Brighter Star than You Will Shine" (Ross, Prime) – 4:32
8. "Twist and Shout" – 3:34
9. "Closing Time" – 6:10
10. "Goodnight Jamsie" (Ross, Prime) – 1:47
11. "I Will See You Tomorrow" (Ross, Prime) – 3:20
12. "One Day I'll Go Walking" (Ross, McIntosh) – 5:00

== 2012 Reissue ==
On 22 October 2012, Edsel Records released a deluxe remastered edition of the album, featuring a bonus CD of material and a DVD containing videos.

Disc 1
No.	Title	Length
1.	"James Joyce Soles"
2.	"Fellow Hoodlums"
3.	"Your Swaying Arms"
4.	"Cover from the Sky"
5.	"The Day That Jackie Jumped the Jail"
6.	"The Wildness"
7.	"A Brighter Star Than You Will Shine"
8.	"Twist and Shout"
9.	"Closing Time"
10.	"Goodnight Jamsie"
11.	"I Will See You Tomorrow"
12.	"One Day I'll Go Walking"
13.	"Fourteen Years"
14.	"Faifley"
15.	"Good"
16.	"Golden Bells"
17.	"I Was Like That"
18.	"The Friends of Billy Bear"
19.	"Into the Good Night"

Disc 2
No.	Title	Length
1.	"What Do You Want the Girl to Do?" (Live at Wembley Arena, 11 September 1990)
2.	"Real Gone Kid" (Halfway to Paradise Session, 7 October 1988)
3.	"Loaded" (Halfway to Paradise Session, 7 October 1988)
4.	"One Hundred Things" (Live at Glasgow SECC, 10 December 1989)
5.	"Wild Mountain Thyme" (Live at Theaterhaus Stuttgart, 8 October 1991)
6.	"Silhouette" (Live at Glasgow SECC, 10 December 1989)
7.	"I'll Never Fall in Love Again" (Live at Glasgow SECC, 10 December 1989)
8.	"Christmas (Baby Please Come Home)" (Live at Manchester GMEX, 20 December 1989)
9.	"I'm Down" (Live at Glasgow Barrowlands, 22 December 1989)
10.	"Closing Time" (7" Version)
11.	"Twist and Shout" (Extended Version)
12.	"Closing Time" (Extended Version)
13.	"Your Swaying Arms" (12" Version)
14.	"Your Swaying Arms" (Drumapella Mix)
15.	"Your Swaying Arms" (Dub Mix)

Disc 3: DVD
No.	Title	Length
1.	"Your Swaying Arms" (Promo Video)
2.	"A Brighter Star Than You Will Shine" (Promo Video)
3.	"Twist and Shout" (Promo Video)
4.	"Closing Time" (Promo Video)
5.	"Cover from the Sky" (Promo Video)

== Personnel ==
- Ricky Ross – vocals, guitar, piano, keyboard
- Lorraine McIntosh – vocal
- James Prime – keyboard
- Ewen Vernal – bass
- Graeme Kelling – guitar
- Dougie Vipond – drums
