= Love and Regret =

- 7-inch single artwork

Single by Deacon Blue

from the album When the World Knows Your Name
- B-side: "Down in the Flood"; "Undeveloped Heart"; "It's All in the Game"; "Spanish Moon"; "Dark End of the Street"; "When Will You (Make My Telephone Ring)"
- Released: 4 September 1989
- Genre: Pop rock, sophisti-pop
- Length: 4:48; 9:55 (extended mix)
- Label: CBS
- Songwriter: Ricky Ross
- Producer: Warne Livesey

Deacon Blue singles chronology
"Fergus Sings the Blues" (1989)	"Love and Regret" (1989)	"Queen of the New Year" (1989)

Alternative cover
- EP artwork

"Love and Regret" is the fourth single from the album When the World Knows Your Name by Scottish rock band Deacon Blue. The song was released on 4 September 1989. The main B-side of the single is "Down in the Flood", while some versions of the single contain the additional B-side "Undeveloped Heart", which Ricky Ross later re-recorded as a solo artist. A limited-edition four-track live Extended play (EP) single was released on 10-inch vinyl and CD formats at the same time as the standard singles.

== Track listings ==
All songs were written by Ricky Ross except where noted.

7-inch and cassette single (DEAC 10; DEAC C10)

1. "Love and Regret" – 4:48
2. "Down in the Flood" (Ross, Deacon Blue) – 4:05

12-inch single (DEAC T10)

1. "Love and Regret" (extended mix) – 9:55
2. "Down in the Flood" (Minimal mix) (Ross, Deacon Blue) – 4:28
3. "Undeveloped Heart" (Ross, James Prime) – 3:37

CD single (CDDEAC 10)

1. "Love and Regret" – 4:48
2. "Down in the Flood" (extended mix) (Ross, Deacon Blue) – 4:13
3. "Undeveloped Heart" (Ross, Prime) – 3:37
4. "Love and Regret" (extended mix) – 7:18

10-inch and CD EP (DEAC QT 10; DEAC C 10)

1. "Love and Regret" / "It's All in the Game" (live) (Ross, Carl Sigman, Charles Dawes) – 6:58
2. "Spanish Moon" (Lowell George) / "Down in the Flood" (live) – 5:05
3. "Dark End of the Street" (live) – 2:08
4. "When Will You (Make My Telephone Ring)" (live) – 5:28

The live EP tracks were recorded at the following places and dates:

- "Love and Regret" / "It's All in the Game": The Brighton Dome on 22 May 1989
- "Spanish Moon" / "Down in the Flood": The Marquee on 20 November 1986
- "Dark End of the Street" / "When Will You (Make My Telephone Ring)": The Venue, Dee Why, Sydney, Australia, on 18 July 1989

== Charts ==
Chart (1989)	Peak position
Europe (Eurochart Hot 100)	76
Ireland (IRMA)	10
Italy Airplay (Music & Media)	11
UK Singles (Official Charts)	28
