= Charlotte Anne =

Single by Julian Cope

from the album My Nation Underground
- B-side: "Books"; "A Question of Temperature"; "Christmas Mourning"
- Released: 19 September 1988
- Recorded: 1988
- Genre: Alternative rock
- Label: Island
- Songwriter: Julian Cope
- Producer: Ron Fair

Julian Cope singles chronology
"Eve's Volcano (Covered in Sin)" (1987)	"Charlotte Anne" (1988)	"5 O'Clock World" (1988)

"Charlotte Anne" is a song by English singer Julian Cope released as the first single from his album My Nation Underground in 1988. The song was Cope's only chart-topping single on any U.S. chart, reaching number one on the Modern Rock Tracks chart in the United States for one week in early 1989.

It was released on 7", CD, 12" and 12" picture disc formats.

== Track listing ==
12" (12IS380), 12" picture disc (12ISP380) and CD (CIDP380) ISLAND IS380

1. "Charlotte Anne" (Cope)
2. "Books" (McCulloch/Cope)
3. "A Question of Temperature" (Schung/Hanny/Appel)
4. "Christmas Mourning" (Cope)

7" single IS380

1. "Charlotte Anne"
2. "Christmas Mourning"

== Charts ==
Chart (1988)	Peak position
UK Singles (OCC)	35
US Alternative Airplay (Billboard)	1

== See also ==
- List of Billboard number-one alternative singles of the 1980s
