= Fried (album) =

Studio album by Julian Cope
- Released: 19 November 1984
- Genre: Neo-psychedelia; psychedelic pop
- Length: 40:31
- Label: Mercury
- Producer: Steve Lovell

Julian Cope chronology
World Shut Your Mouth (1984)	Fried (1984)	Saint Julian (1987)

Professional ratings
Review scores
Source	Rating
AllMusic	3.5/5 stars
Encyclopedia of Popular Music	3/5 stars
The Great Rock Discography	7/10
MusicHound	2.5/5
Q	4/5 stars
Record Mirror	4/5 stars
The Rolling Stone Album Guide	2.5/5 stars
Select	4/5

Fried is the second solo album by Julian Cope.

== Background ==
Fried was released on 9 November 1984, just six months after Cope's first solo album World Shut Your Mouth. Cope retained the guitarist Steve Lovell and the guest oboe player Kate St. John from the previous album, but added his Drayton Bassett musical foil Donald Ross Skinner on rhythm and slide guitars, the former Waterboys drummer Chris Whitten and, on one track, the former Mighty Wah! guitarist, Steve "Brother Johnno" Johnson.

The album was much more raw in approach than its predecessor. In many respects, it prefigured the looser and more mystical style which Cope would follow and be praised for in the following decade. Notoriously, the sleeve showed a naked Cope crouched on top of the Alvecote Mound slag heap clad only in a large turtle shell. Song topics and approaches included early examples of Cope's subsequent tendency to mythologise his own life and connect it to legend and ritual ("Reynard the Fox" combined English folk tales with reference to Cope's notorious onstage stomach-slashing incident the previous year; "Bill Drummond Said" was an oblique fable about Cope's former manager and the future KLF mainstay) and his developing interest in paganism ("O King of Chaos", which Cope later revealed was an invocation to Odin). Several songs had little or no backing, with Cope accompanying himself.

Despite receiving better reviews than its ill-fated predecessor, Fried sold even more poorly at the time, as did the accompanying single, "Sunspots". The commercial failure of the album led to Polygram dropping Cope. He subsequently found a new manager, the artist and musician-cum-prankster Cally Callomon, and signed a new deal with Island Records. Skinner and Whitten remained with Cope for the next album, Saint Julian.

Bill Drummond's 1986 album, The Man, replied in kind to "Bill Drummond Said", with a song titled "Julian Cope Is Dead".

In 2007, The Guardian included the album in their list of "1000 Albums to Hear Before You Die".

== Track listing ==
All tracks are written by Julian Cope.

Side one
No.	Title	Length
1.	"Reynard the Fox"	6:14
2.	"Bill Drummond Said"	2:28
3.	"Laughing Boy"	5:47
4.	"Me Singing"	3:33
5.	"Sunspots"	5:14

Side two
No.	Title	Length
6.	"The Bloody Assizes"	3:17
7.	"Search Party"	3:56
8.	"O King of Chaos"	2:36
9.	"Holy Love"	3:21
10.	"Torpedo"	4:01

1996 reissue bonus tracks
No.	Title	Length
11.	"I Went on a Chourney" (Single B-side)	2:28
12.	"Mic Mak Mok" (Single B-side)	4:47
13.	"Land of Fear" (Single B-side)	5:10

=== 2015 expanded edition ===
The first disc of the expanded edition contains the ten tracks from the original album.

Disc two
No.	Title	Length
1.	"Land of Fear"	5:06
2.	"Christmas Morning" (Janice Long session 12/12/1984)	2:55
3.	"Disaster" (Janice Long session 12/12/1984)	2:12
4.	"Mic Mak Mok"	4:46
5.	"Pulsar" (Janice Long session 12/12/1984)	3:33
6.	"Sunspots" (John Peel session 29/05/1984)	2:56
7.	"Me Singing" (John Peel session 29/05/1984)	3:32
8.	"Search Party" (John Peel session 29/05/1984)	3:32
9.	"Crazy Farm Animal" (Janice Long session 12/12/1984)	3:05
10.	"I Went on a Chourney"	2:22
11.	"Hobby" (John Peel session 29/05/1984)	1:12

== Charts ==
Chart (1984)	Peak position
UK Albums Chart	87

== Personnel ==
- Julian Cope – vocals, bass guitar, rhythm guitar, piano, organ
- Steve Lovell – electric guitar, recorder solo on "Sunspots"
- Donald Ross Skinner – slide and electric guitar
- Chris Whitten – drums
- Steve "Brother Johnno" Johnson – electric guitar solo on "Sunspots"
- Kate St. John – oboe
- David Carter – tuba on "Sunspots"

Technical

- Paul King – production supervisor
- Paul "Chas" Watkins – engineer, recorded by
- P. St. John Nettleton – art direction, design
- Donato Cinicolo – photography
