= World Shut Your Mouth (song) =

1986 single by Julian Cope

Single by Julian Cope

from the album Saint Julian
- B-side: "Umpteenth Unnatural Blues"
- Released: 15 September 1986
- Length: 3:34 (album version); 3:05 (single version)
- Label: Island
- Songwriter: Julian Cope
- Producer: Ed Stasium

Julian Cope singles chronology
"Sunspots" (1985)	"World Shut Your Mouth" (1986)	"Trampolene" (1987)

"World Shut Your Mouth" is a song by English singer-songwriter Julian Cope, released as the first single from his third album, Saint Julian (1987), on 15 September 1986. The title of the song is the same as the title of Cope's first solo album, World Shut Your Mouth, but the track does not appear on that album.

== Release ==
"World Shut Your Mouth" was released as a single from Saint Julian in September 1986. The song is Julian Cope's biggest hit, reaching number 19 in the UK and number 84 in the US, his only single to chart there. Cope said of the success he achieved with the song, "I hated [being a pop star]. I hated the assholes. And I hated the fact ... it's what Smithy [Mark E. Smith] said himself, that all the English bands act like peasants with free milk. All their belligerence went and they turned into forelock-tugging gruelheads as soon as they were around record company types".

Ned Raggett of AllMusic described the song as a "simply fantastic hit UK single".

== Accolades ==
Year	Publication	Country	Accolade	Rank	Ref.
1986	NME	United Kingdom	"Singles of the Year"	27	
2010	Robert Dimery	United States	1001 Songs You Must Hear Before You Die	*	
2011	NME	United Kingdom	"501 Lost Songs"	*	
"*" denotes an unordered list.

== Track listings ==
All songs were written by Julian Cope except where noted.

UK 7-inch single (IS 290)

1. "World Shut Your Mouth" – 3:34
2. "Umpteenth Unnatural Blues" – 2:58

UK 12-inch single (12 IS 290)

1. "World Shut Your Mouth" – 3:34
2. "(I've Got) Levitation" (Hall, Sutherland) – 3:02
3. "Umpteenth Unnatural Blues" – 2:58
4. "Non-Alignment Pact" (Pere Ubu) – 2:48
5. "Transporting" (Julian Cope Group) – 3:34

UK 12-inch remix single (12 ISX 290)

1. "World Shut Your Mouth" [Remix by Trouble Funk - Long Version] – 4:35
2. "(I've Got) Levitation" (Hall, Sutherland) – 3:02
3. "World Shut Your Mouth" [Remix by Trouble Funk - Short Version] – 3:09

UK cassette single (C IS 290)

1. Interview – 8:00
2. "World Shut Your Mouth" – 3:34
3. "(I've Got) Levitation" (Hall, Sutherland) – 3:02
4. "Umpteenth Unnatural Blues" – 2:58
5. "Non-Alignment Pact" (Pere Ubu) – 2:48

== Charts ==
Chart (1986–1987)	Peak position
Australia (Kent Music Report)	51
Canada Top Singles (RPM)	97
Europe (European Hot 100 Singles)	67
Ireland (IRMA)	13
New Zealand (Recorded Music NZ)	35
South Africa (Springbok Radio)	15
UK Singles (Official Charts)	19
US Billboard Hot 100	84
US Album Rock Tracks (Billboard)	22

Chart (1992)	Peak position
UK Singles (Official Charts)	44

== Release history ==
Region	Date	Format(s)	Label(s)	Ref.
United Kingdom	15 September 1986	7-inch vinyl; 12-inch vinyl	Island	
United Kingdom (re-release)	27 July 1992	7-inch vinyl; 12-inch vinyl; CD; cassette	Island	
