= Cover from the Sky =

1991 single by Deacon Blue

Single by Deacon Blue

from the album Fellow Hoodlums
- B-side: "What Do You Want the Girl to Do"; "Christmas (Baby Please Come Home)"; "Wild Mountain Thyme"
- Released: 2 December 1991
- Length: 3:34
- Label: Columbia
- Songwriter: Ricky Ross
- Producer: Jon Kelly

Deacon Blue singles chronology
"Closing Time" (1991)	"Cover from the Sky" (1991)	"Your Town" (1992)

"Cover from the Sky" is the fourth and final single from Scottish band Deacon Blue's third studio album, Fellow Hoodlums (1991). It was the first single to be released with Lorraine McIntosh on lead vocals. The various versions of the single introduce three B-sides, all of which are covers. Various live or alternative versions of previously released Deacon Blue songs also span the different single versions. "Cover from the Sky" reached number 31 on the UK Singles Chart.

== Track listings ==
All songs were written by Ricky Ross except where noted.

- 7-inch and cassette single (657673 7; 657673 4)
1. "Cover from the Sky" – 3:34
2. "What Do You Want the Girl to Do" (live) – 5:02
3. "Christmas (Baby Please Come Home)" (live) (Spector, Greenwich, Barry) – 4:14
- 12-inch single (657673 6)
1. "Cover from the Sky" – 3:34
2. "Real Gone Kid" (session) – 4:12
3. "Loaded" (session) (Ross, Prime, Kelling) – 4:47
4. "One Hundred Things" (live) – 5:44
- CD single (657673 2)
1. "Cover from the Sky" – 3:34
2. "Wild Mountain Thyme" (McPeake) – 3:46
3. "Silhouette" (live) – 3:17
4. "I'll Never Fall in Love Again" (live) (Bacharach, David) – 2:40

== Charts ==
Chart (1991)	Peak position
UK Singles (OCC)	31
UK Airplay (Music Week)	29
