= Raintown (album) =

Studio album by Deacon Blue
- Released: 26 May 1987 (UK)
- Recorded: Air, London; December 1986 - February 1987
- Genre: Pop, rock
- Length: 41:48 (Standard); 47:06 (UK CD version)
- Label: Columbia
- Producer: Jon Kelly

Deacon Blue chronology
Raintown (1987)	Riches (1988)

Singles from Raintown
- 1. "Dignity" Released: March 1987; 2. "Loaded" Released: June 1987; 3. "When Will You (Make My Telephone Ring)" Released: August 1987; 4. "Chocolate Girl" Released: July 1988

Raintown is the debut album by Scottish pop rock band Deacon Blue. The album, written largely by lead singer Ricky Ross, was released in the United Kingdom on 26 May 1987. It proved a commercial success and has to date sold around a million copies, peaking in the UK Albums Chart at no. 14 and remaining in the charts for a year and a half.

The album, widely praised as Deacon Blue's finest work, has the overtones of a concept album relating to the struggles of urban life in the inner city – the city in question being unmistakably Glasgow, referenced by the roots of the band and by the images by photographer Oscar Marzaroli on the cover of the album: the view of a rainy day over Glasgow's West End (with the Finnieston Crane featuring prominently). The back cover shows a long-exposure shot of the M8 motorway carving through Glasgow city centre (taken from Charing Cross), with the Mitchell Library and Elmbank Gardens on either side.

== Background ==
The short intro, "Born in a Storm", melodic and interspersed with an unmistakably gloomy atmosphere created by the name, launches into the title track "Raintown", a natural extension of this plot. The weather remains a feature of the atmosphere of the album, reflecting the epitome of the Scots word dreich. Played out in the course of the album is the struggle with money ("Loaded"), unemployment, dreams of something better ("Dignity", "The Very Thing"), culminating in an angry attack upon urban life ("Town to Be Blamed"). The album does feature lighter experiences though, with the love songs ("Chocolate Girl") and "Love's Great Fears" – a track that Ross has often cited as his all-time favourite, featuring a slide guitar outro by Chris Rea.

In an interview given to the Daily Record in 2012, songwriter Ricky Ross explained the rationale and reasoning behind the writing of all of the songs on the album.

== Legacy ==
On 27 February 2006, Raintown was reissued as part of Columbia's Legacy Edition series. The re-issue was expanded to 2 CDs. The first CD featured the original 11-track album. The second CD featured alternate cuts of all 11 album tracks, as well as the two original CD bonus tracks "Riches" and "Kings of the Western World".

The new edition did not include the varied bonus cuts (remixes and b-sides) that were found on the singles from the album.

Another reissue was released on 22 October 2012 by Edsel Records as part of a catalogue reissue program for the band's first five studio albums. This set contained all of the B-sides and remixes associated with the album, as well as also including the Legacy Edition bonus disc.

== Reception ==
Professional ratings
Review scores
Source	Rating
AllMusic	4.5/5 stars
Record Mirror	5/5 stars

Spin called it, "a listener's delight, yet a reviewer's frustration — no easy comparisons, no simple descriptions, no trendy affiliations, because few other acts make such surprisingly timeless, sophisticated, and genuinely emotional pop music these days."

== Track listing ==
All songs written by Ricky Ross, except where noted:

=== Original 1987 album ===
1. "Born in a Storm"– 1:33
2. "Raintown" – 3:50
3. "Ragman" – 3:08
4. "He Looks Like Spencer Tracy Now" – 3:50
5. "Loaded" (James Prime, Ricky Ross, Graeme Kelling) – 4:29
6. "When Will You (Make My Telephone Ring)" – 5:05
7. "Chocolate Girl" – 3:18
8. "Dignity" – 4:00
9. "The Very Thing" – 3:34
10. "Love's Great Fears" (Ricky Ross, James Prime) – 3:42
11. "Town to Be Blamed" (Ricky Ross, James Prime) – 5:19

=== CD Bonus Tracks (UK Release) ===
1. "Riches" – 2:39
2. "Kings of the Western World" – 2:39

=== Legacy Edition Bonus CD [2006] ===
1. "Born in a Storm (Live From The Glasgow School of Art, 04.07.87)" – 1:14
2. "Raintown [Live at the Marquee '86]" – 3:49
3. "Ragman [Demo Version]" – 3:13
4. "He Looks Like Spencer Tracy Now [Live at the Marquee '86]" – 4:50
5. "Loaded [Demo Version]" (Prime, Ross, Kelling) – 4:11
6. "When Will You (Make My Telephone Ring) [Air Studio Vocal Mix]" – 5:03
7. "Chocolate Girl [Live at the Marquee '86]" – 3:28
8. "Dignity [Live at the Marquee '86]" – 4:27
9. "The Very Thing [BBC Session for Radio 1's Mark Goodier Show]" – 3:05
10. "Love's Great Fears [Live at the Marquee '86]" (Ross, Prime) – 4:01
11. "Town to Be Blamed (Live From The Glasgow School of Art, 04.07.87)" (Ross, Prime) – 3:35
12. "Riches" – 2:39
13. "Kings of the Western World" – 2:39

=== 2012 Edsel Records Reissue ===
Disc 1
No.	Title	Length
1.	"Born in a Storm"	1:33
2.	"Raintown"	3:50
3.	"Ragman"	3:07
4.	"He Looks Like Spencer Tracy Now"	3:50
5.	"Loaded"	4:30
6.	"When Will You (Make My Telephone Ring)?"	5:04
7.	"Chocolate Girl"	3:18
8.	"Dignity"	3:59
9.	"The Very Thing"	3:34
10.	"Love's Great Fears"	3:41
11.	"Town to Be Blamed"	5:21
12.	"Which Side Are You On?"	2:58
13.	"Kings of the Western World"	2:40
14.	"Angeliou" (Live)	6:18
15.	"Just Like Boys"	3:15
16.	"Raintown" (Piano Version)	3:38
17.	"Riches"	2:38
18.	"Church"	3:16
19.	"Shifting Sand"	3:18
20.	"Suffering"	2:43
21.	"Ribbons and Bows"	4:16

Disc 2
No.	Title	Length
1.	"Dignity" (Bob Clearmountain Version)	4:15
2.	"Long Distance from Just Across the Road"	2:54
3.	"When Will You (Make My Telephone Ring)?" (Extended Version)	5:32
4.	"Town to Be Blamed" (Live)	4:43
5.	"Ronnie Spector"	3:33
6.	"Dignity" (Bob Clearmountain Extended Version)	5:49
7.	"That Brilliant Feeling No. 1"	3:17
8.	"Punch and Judy Man"	3:52
9.	"Disneyworld"	2:58
10.	"S.H.A.R.O.N."	4:16
11.	"Chocolate Girl" (Extended Version)	3:37
12.	"Dignity" (Live at Glasgow Barrowlands 1988)	4:56
13.	"Love's Great Fears" (Live at Glasgow Barrowlands 1988)	6:24
14.	"The Very Thing" (Livesey Remix)	3:42
15.	"Love's Great Fears" (Brauer Remix)	3:44

Disc 3: Legacy Edition Bonus Disc
No.	Title	Length
1.	"Born in a Storm" (Live at Glasgow Art School 1987)	1:14
2.	"Raintown" (Live at the Marquee 1986)	3:49
3.	"Ragman" (Demo Version)	3:14
4.	"He Looks Like Spencer Tracy Now" (Live at the Marquee 1986)	4:50
5.	"Loaded" (Demo Version)	4:11
6.	"When Will You (Make My Telephone Ring)?" (Air Studio Vocal Mix)	5:03
7.	"Chocolate Girl" (Live at the Marquee 1986)	3:55
8.	"Dignity" (Live at the Marquee 1986)	4:00
9.	"The Very Thing" (BBC Session for Radio 1's Mark Goodier Show)	3:05
10.	"Love's Great Fears" (Live at the Marquee 1986)	4:01
11.	"Town to Be Blamed" (Live at Glasgow Art School 1987)	3:32
12.	"Souvenirs"	2:41
13.	"Don't Let the Teardrops Start"	3:22

DVD: Music Videos
No.	Title	Length
1.	"Dignity" (Version 1)
2.	"Loaded"
3.	"Dignity" (Version 2)
4.	"When Will You (Make My Telephone Ring)?"
5.	"Dignity" (US Version)
6.	"Chocolate Girl"

== Personnel ==
=== Deacon Blue ===
- Ricky Ross – lead vocals (additional guitar, piano & keyboard on bonus tracks on reissue version)
- Lorraine McIntosh – backing & harmony vocals
- Graeme Kelling – guitar, low voice
- James Prime – keyboards, backing vocals
- Ewen Vernal – bass guitar, backing vocals
- Dougie Vipond – drums, percussion

=== Additional musicians ===
- Chris Rea – slide guitar on "Love's Great Fears"
- B.J. Cole – pedal steel guitar on "Chocolate Girl"
- Jimmy Helms, George Chandler, Jimmy Chambers (Londonbeat) – backing vocals on "When Will You (Make My Telephone Ring)"
