= Beautiful Love (Julian Cope song) =

Single by Julian Cope

from the album Peggy Suicide
- B-side: "Port of Saints"/"Love L.U.V. (Beautiful Love Version)"/"Unisex Cathedral"
- Released: 1991
- Genre: Neo-psychedelia
- Length: 3:14
- Label: Island
- Songwriter: Julian Cope
- Producer: Donald Ross Skinner

Julian Cope singles chronology
"China Doll" (1989)	"Beautiful Love" (1991)	"Safesurfer" (1991)

"Beautiful Love" is a song by the English singer-songwriter Julian Cope. It is the first single released in support of his 1991 album Peggy Suicide. The Beautiful Love e.p. includes four tracks - see sidebar.

== Charts ==
Chart (1991)	Peak position
UK Singles (OCC)	32
UK Airplay (Music Week)	25
US Modern Rock Tracks (Billboard)	4
