= Queen of the New Year =

Single by Deacon Blue

from the album When the World Knows Your Name
- B-side: "My America"; "Las Vegas"
- Released: December 1989
- Genre: Sophisti-pop
- Length: 3:36 (7-inch); 5:47 (12-inch)
- Label: Columbia
- Songwriters: Ricky Ross, James Prime
- Producer: Warne Livesey

Deacon Blue singles chronology
"Love and Regret" (1989)	"Queen of the New Year" (1989)	"Four Bacharach & David Songs" (1990)

"Queen of the New Year" is the fifth and final single from the album When the World Knows Your Name by the Scottish pop rock band Deacon Blue.

It reached No. 21 in the UK Singles Chart, but went as high as No. 4 in the Irish Singles Chart, the group's fifth Irish top 10 hit in a row.

The main B-side is "My America". Some versions of the single contain the additional B-side, "Las Vegas", along with a longer version of the album track "Sad Loved Girl" and an acoustic demo version of the album track "Circus Lights".

As with the previous single, "Love and Regret", a limited edition four track live EP single was also released, this time in 12" vinyl and CD formats.

== Track listing ==
All songs written by Ricky Ross, except where noted:

=== 7" single (Deac 11) ===
1. "Queen of the New Year" (Ross, Prime) – 3:36
2. "My America" – 3:10

=== 7" gatefold EP single (Deac ep11) ===
1. "Queen of the New Year" (Ross, Prime) – 3:36
2. "My America" – 3:10
3. "Sad Loved Girl (Long Version)" – 3:17
4. "Las Vegas" – 3:55

=== 12" single (Deac t11) ===
1. "Queen of the New Year (Extended Mix)" (Ross, Prime) – 5:47
2. "My America" – 3:10
3. "Circus Lights (Acoustic Version)" – 2:56

=== Cassette single (Deac m11) ===
1. "Queen of the New Year" (Ross, Prime) – 3:36
2. "My America" – 3:10

=== 3" CD single (655525 3) ===
1. "Queen of the New Year (Extended Mix)" (Ross, Prime) – 5:47
2. "My America" – 3:10
3. "Queen of the New Year" (Ross, Prime) – 3:36
4. "Circus Lights (Acoustic Version)" – 2:56

=== CD single (CDDeac 11) ===
1. "Queen of the New Year" (Ross, Prime) – 3:36
2. "My America" – 3:10
3. "Sad Loved Girl (Long Version)" – 3:17
4. "Las Vegas" – 3:55

=== Limited edition live EP ===
12" single (Deac qt11) Cassette single (Deac qm11)

1. "Queen of the New Year (Live)" (Ross, Prime) – 3:49
2. "Chocolate Girl (Live)"
3. "Undeveloped Heart (Live)" (Ross, Prime) – 5:15
4. "Town to Be Blamed (Live)" (Ross, Prime) – 6:39

== Chart performance ==
Chart (1990)	Peak position
UK Singles Chart	21
Irish Singles Chart	4
