= Wages Day =

1989 single by Deacon Blue

Single by Deacon Blue

from the album When the World Knows Your Name
- B-side: "Take Me to the Place"; "Take the Saints Away"; "Trampolene"
- Released: 20 February 1989
- Length: 3:08; 5:04 (12-inch mix)
- Label: CBS
- Songwriter: Ricky Ross
- Producer: Warne Livesey

Deacon Blue singles chronology
"Real Gone Kid" (1988)	"Wages Day" (1989)	"Fergus Sings the Blues" (1989)

"Wages Day" is a song by Scottish rock band Deacon Blue, released on 20 February 1989 as the second single from their second album, When the World Knows Your Name (1989). The song reached the top 20 in Ireland, Spain, and the United Kingdom. The main B-side is "Take Me to the Place", which is musically based on the hymn "Abide with Me" and the traditional melody "Eventide". Some versions of the single contain two songs: "Take the Saints Away" and a cover of Julian Cope's "Trampolene".

== Track listings ==
All songs were written by Ricky Ross except where noted.

7-inch and cassette single

1. "Wages Day"
2. "Take Me to the Place" (Ricky Ross, traditional)

7-inch EP and CD single

1. "Wages Day"
2. "Take Me to the Place" (Ross, traditional)
3. "Take the Saints Away"
4. "Trampolene" (Julian Cope)

12-inch single

A1. "Wages Day (12-inch mix)
B1. "Take Me to the Place" (Ross, traditional)
B2. "Wages Day"

== Charts ==
Chart (1989)	Peak position
Australia (ARIA)	79
Europe (Eurochart Hot 100)	60
Ireland (IRMA)	10
New Zealand (Recorded Music NZ)	24
Spain (AFYVE)	14
UK Singles (Official Charts)	18
