= Fergus Sings the Blues =

- Cover of 7-inch single

Single by Deacon Blue

from the album When the World Knows Your Name
- B-side: "Long Window to Love"; "London A to Z"; "Back Here in Beanoland"
- Released: May 1989
- Genre: Pop rock, sophisti-pop
- Length: 3:54
- Label: Columbia
- Songwriters: Ricky Ross; James Prime
- Producer: Warne Livesey

Deacon Blue singles chronology
"Wages Day" (1989)	"Fergus Sings the Blues" (1989)	"Love and Regret" (1989)

"Fergus Sings the Blues" is the third single from the album When the World Knows Your Name by the Scottish rock band Deacon Blue. Writer Ricky Ross has stated in an interview with Johnnie Walker and on SpectatorTV that the song was inspired by "Gael's Blue" by Scottish singer-songwriter Michael Marra.

Homesick James was mentioned by name in "Fergus Sings the Blues", by the lyric "Homesick James, my biggest influence". James & Bobby Purify were also name-checked in the following line, "Tell me why, James & Bobby Purify".

The main B-side is "Long Window to Love". Some versions of the single contain one or more of the following additional B-sides: "London A to Z", and "Back Here in Beanoland".

The 10" vinyl and the standard CD single release of the single are entitled "Four Songs from Scotland". The single was also released in the format of a 7" box single entitled "Souvenir from Scotland".

== Track listings ==
All songs written by Ricky Ross, except where noted:

7" single (Deac 9)

1. "Fergus Sings the Blues" (Ross, Prime) - 3:54
2. "Long Window to Love" - 3:12

7" box single: A Souvenir from Scotland (Deac b9)

1. "Fergus Sings the Blues" (Ross, Prime) - 3:54
2. "Long Window to Love" - 3:12

10" single: Four Songs from Scotland (Deac q9)

1. "Fergus Sings the Blues" (Ross, Prime) - 3:54
2. "Long Window to Love" - 3:12
3. "London A to Z" - 3:42
4. "Back Here in Beanoland" - 3:01

12" single (Deac t8) 12" single Gatefold Sleeve (Deac gt8)

1. "Fergus Sings the Blues (Extended Mix)" (Ross, Prime) - 6:57
2. "Long Window to Love" - 3:12
3. "Fergus Sings the Blues" (Ross, Prime) - 3:54

Cassette single (Deac c9) 3" CD single (654912 3)

1. "Fergus Sings the Blues" (Ross, Prime) - 3:54
2. "Fergus Sings the Blues (Extended Mix)" (Ross, Prime) - 6:57
3. "Long Window to Love" - 3:12
4. "London A to Z" - 3:42

CD single: Four Songs from Scotland (CDDeac 9)

1. "Fergus Sings the Blues" (Ross, Prime) - 3:54
2. "Long Window to Love" - 3:12
3. "London A to Z" - 3:42
4. "Back Here in Beanoland" - 3:01

== Chart performance ==
Chart (1989)	Peak position
UK Singles Chart	14
Irish Singles Chart	7
