= Chocolate Girl (Deacon Blue song) =

Single by Deacon Blue

from the album Raintown
- B-side: "S.H.A.R.O.N."
- Released: 4 July 1988
- Genre: Pop rock, blues
- Length: 3:28 (7")
- Label: Columbia
- Songwriter(s): Ricky Ross
- Producer(s): Jon Kelly; Michael Brauer

Deacon Blue singles chronology
"When Will You (Make My Telephone Ring)" (1988)	"Chocolate Girl" (1988)	"Real Gone Kid" (1988)

"Chocolate Girl" is the fourth song released as a single from the 1987 album Raintown by the Scottish group Deacon Blue. The single version differed from the album version of the song. It is a remix by the American mixer Michael Brauer, which adds a longer musical interlude in the middle of the song and gives greater emphasis to B.J. Cole's pedal steel guitar in parts of the song.

The track reached No. 43 in the UK Singles Chart in July 1988, spending seven weeks in the listing.

In an interview given to the Daily Record in 2012, songwriter Ricky Ross explained that "Chocolate Girl" was "about someone’s relationship which sounded bad. I don’t really like sexist love songs, that awful song by Eric Clapton, "Wonderful Tonight". There’s a song by Prefab Sprout which says the same thing, called "Cruel", which I love". The Herald also spotted "Chocolate Girl’s dysfunctional Don Juan" running through the lyrics. Paddy McAloon claimed in a 1990 interview that the band approached him to contribute vocals to the song.

== Track listing ==
All songs written by Ricky Ross, except where noted:

=== 7" single (deac 6) ===
1. "Chocolate Girl (Brauer Remix)" – 3:28
2. "S.H.A.R.O.N." – 4:13

=== 7" limited edition single (deac ep6) ===
1. "Chocolate Girl (Brauer Remix)" – 3:28
2. "S.H.A.R.O.N." – 4:13
3. "The Very Thing (Livesey Remix)" – 3:29
4. "Love's Great Fears (Brauer Remix)" (Prime, Ross) – 3:33

=== 12" single (deac t6) ===
1. "Chocolate Girl (Brauer Remix) (Extended Version)"
2. "Dignity (Live)
3. "Love's Great Fears (Live) (Prime, Ross)
4. "S.H.A.R.O.N." – 4:13

=== CD single (CDDeac 6) ===
1. "Chocolate Girl (Brauer Remix)" – 3:28
2. "S.H.A.R.O.N." – 4:13
3. "The Very Thing (Livesey Remix)" – 3:29
4. "Love's Great Fears (Brauer Remix)" (Prime, Ross) – 3:33
