= Your Swaying Arms =

Single by Deacon Blue

from the album Fellow Hoodlums
- B-side: "Fourteen Years"; "Faifley"
- Released: May 1991
- Genre: Pop
- Length: 4:13
- Label: Columbia
- Songwriter: Ricky Ross
- Producer: Warne Livesey

Deacon Blue singles chronology
"Four Bacharach & David Songs" (1990)	"Your Swaying Arms" (1991)	"Twist and Shout" (1991)

"Your Swaying Arms" is the first single from the album Fellow Hoodlums by the Scottish rock band Deacon Blue.

Released in May 1991, it reached number 23 on the UK Singles Chart, but went as high as number six in Ireland, the last in the group's run of seven Irish top 10 hits between 1988 and 1991.

The releases contained two B-sides, "Fourteen Years" and "Faifley", both of which are rough, bluesy songs that Ricky Ross speaks and sings in a deep, raspy voice.

The 10" vinyl version, surprisingly, contained techno dance remixes of the otherwise placid track.

Ross released a solo version of the song on his 2022 album "Short Stories Vol.2".

== Track listing ==
All songs written by Ricky Ross.

=== 7" Single (656893 7) ===
1. "Your Swaying Arms" – 4:13
2. "Fourteen Years" – 2:44

=== 12" Single (656893 6) ===
1. "Your Swaying Arms (Extended Version)" – 5:57
2. "Faifley" – 1:41
3. "Your Swaying Arms" – 4:13

=== Cassette Single (656893 4) ===
1. "Your Swaying Arms" – 4:13
2. "Fourteen Years" – 2:44

=== CD Single (656893 2) ===
1. "Your Swaying Arms" – 4:13
2. "Fourteen Years" – 2:44
3. "Faifley" – 1:41

=== 10" Single (656893 8) ===
1. "Your Swaying Arms (12" Alternative Mix)" – 5:56
2. "Your Swaying Arms (Drumapella Mix)" – 4:46
3. "Your Swaying Arms (7" Mix)" – 4:08
4. "Your Swaying Arms (Dub Mix)" – 4:47

== Charts ==
Chart (1991)	Peak position
Ireland (IRMA)	6
Luxembourg (Radio Luxembourg)	19
UK Singles (OCC)	23
UK Airplay (Music Week)	2
