= Real Gone Kid =

1988 single by Deacon Blue

Single by Deacon Blue

from the album When the World Knows Your Name
- B-side: "Little Lincoln"; "Born Again"; "It's Not Funny Anymore"
- Released: 3 October 1988
- Length: 4:03; 7:06 (extended version)
- Label: CBS
- Songwriter: Ricky Ross
- Producer: Warne Livesey

Deacon Blue singles chronology
"Chocolate Girl" (1988)	"Real Gone Kid" (1988)	"Wages Day" (1989)

Music video
- "Real Gone Kid" on YouTube

"Real Gone Kid" is a song by Scottish pop rock band Deacon Blue. Vocalist Ricky Ross wrote the song about a performance he saw of ex-Lone Justice singer Maria McKee during a time when Deacon Blue and Lone Justice toured together. The lyrics are a tribute to McKee, with the narrator using the term "real gone kid" as a designation for craziness, referring to McKee's "wild" onstage performance style. The song was included on Deacon Blue's second studio album, When the World Knows Your Name (1989).

Issued on 3 October 1988 as the first single from the album, the "Real Gone Kid" single includes three B-sides: "Little Lincoln", a cover of Sam & Dave's "Born Again", and a cover of Hüsker Dü's "It's Not Funny Anymore". "Real Gone Kid" was the band's first top-10 hit, reaching number eight on the UK Singles Chart, number 10 in Ireland, and number five in New Zealand. In Spain, the song peaked at number one for three weeks.

== Music video ==
The music video opens with a brief shot of the Deacon Blue logo, which moves into a line of various people against a white background queuing up to use a photo booth. This then cuts to the band, also against a white background, playing the song. The video consists of alternating shots of photo booth usage and the band playing; featured therein are a gay kiss between two photo booth customers, a scuffle behind the photo booth curtain and Ricky Ross jumping off a Yamaha CP-70 piano. Shots of the photo booth being used by the band members are intertwined in the last shots as the song fades out.

== Track listings ==
All songs were written by Ricky Ross except where noted.

7-inch and cassette single

1. "Real Gone Kid"
2. "Little Lincoln"

Limited-edition 7-inch EP and CD single

A1. "Real Gone Kid"
A2. "Little Lincoln"
B1. "Born Again" (Isaac Hayes, David Porter)
B2. "It's Not Funny Anymore" (Grant Hart)

12-inch and mini-CD single

A1. "Real Gone Kid" (extended version) – 7:04
B1. "Little Lincoln" – 3:05
B2. "Real Gone Kid" (seven inch version) – 4:03

- A limited-edition version also exists with a fold-out picture sleeve.

== Charts ==
=== Weekly charts ===
Chart (1988–1989)	Peak position
Australia (ARIA)	18
Europe (Eurochart Hot 100)	33
Ireland (IRMA)	10
New Zealand (Recorded Music NZ)	5
Spain (AFYVE)	1
UK Singles (Official Charts)	8

=== Year-end charts ===
Chart (1988)	Position
UK Singles (OCC)	62

Chart (1989)	Position
New Zealand (RIANZ)	36

== Certifications ==
Region	Certification	Certified units/sales
United Kingdom (BPI)	Platinum	600,000^{‡}
^{‡} Sales+streaming figures based on certification alone.

== In popular culture ==
Various mixes of the song appeared in adverts for the Boots pharmacy chain in the UK from 2015 to 2017.
