= When Will You (Make My Telephone Ring) =

1987 single by Deacon Blue

- Original release

Single by Deacon Blue

from the album Raintown
- B-side: "Church"; "Angeliou"; "Town to Be Blamed"
- Released: 17 August 1987
- Genre: Pop, blues
- Length: 5:02; 5:24 (12" remix)
- Label: Columbia
- Songwriter(s): Ricky Ross
- Producer(s): Jon Kelly

Deacon Blue singles chronology
"Loaded" (1987)	"When Will You (Make My Telephone Ring)" (1987)	"Chocolate Girl" (1988)

"When Will You (Make My Telephone Ring)"
- Second Release; Cover of 7" single

Single by Deacon Blue

from the album Raintown
- B-side: "That Brilliant Feeling"; "Punch and Judy Man"; "Disneyworld"
- Released: March 1988
- Genre: Pop, blues
- Length: 5:02 (7" version); 5:24 (12" version)
- Label: Columbia
- Songwriter(s): Ricky Ross
- Producer(s): Jon Kelly

Deacon Blue singles chronology
"Dignity" (1988)	"When Will You (Make My Telephone Ring)" (1988)	"Chocolate Girl" (1988)

"When Will You (Make My Telephone Ring)" is a single released by the Scottish group Deacon Blue in 1987 and in 1988. The song features prominent backing vocals from members of R&B group Londonbeat. It was the very first song to be played on Radio Luxembourg after it went satellite at 3AM on 30 December 1991. The video for the song was directed by John Scarlett-Davis and produced by Nick Verden for Radar Films.

In an interview given to the Daily Record in 2012, songwriter Ricky Ross explained that "It’s so hard to remember. I think that song is actually about waiting to be discovered, spurred on by the unrequited love of an old girlfriend".

== Multiple releases ==
"When Will You (Make My Telephone Ring)" has been officially released as a single twice. It was first released in August 1987 as the third single from Deacon Blue's first album Raintown. It peaked at No. 86 in the UK Singles Chart. After sales of Raintown began to increase, the single was re-released in March 1988, following a second release of the first single "Dignity". This single was more successful, peaking at #34.

== Track listings ==
All songs written by Ricky Ross, except where noted:

=== When Will You (Make My Telephone Ring) (1st release) (August 1987) ===
7" Single (Deac 3)

1. "When Will You (Make My Telephone Ring)" - 5:02
2. "Church" - 3:18

12" Single (Deac t3)

1. "When Will You (Make My Telephone Ring) (12" Remix)" - 5:24
2. "Church" - 3:18
3. "Town to Be Blamed" (Live) (Ross, Prime) - 4:27
4. "Angeliou" (Live) (Van Morrison) - 6:19

=== When Will You (Make My Telephone Ring) (2nd Release) (March 1988) ===
7" Single (Deac 5)

1. "When Will You (Make My Telephone Ring)" - 5:02
2. "That Brilliant Feeling #1"

7" Box Set Single (Deac b5)

1. "When Will You (Make My Telephone Ring)" - 5:02
2. "That Brilliant Feeling #1"

12" Single (Deac t5)

1. "When Will You (Make My Telephone Ring)" - 5:02
2. "Punch and Judy Man" - 3:51
3. "That Brilliant Feeling #3"
4. "Disneyworld" - 2:47

CD Single (CDDeac 5)

1. "When Will You (Make My Telephone Ring)" - 5:02
2. "That Brilliant Feeling #2" - 3:41
3. "Punch and Judy Man" - 3:51
4. "Disneyworld" - 2:47

CD Picture Single (CPDeac 5)

1. "When Will You (Make My Telephone Ring)" - 5:02
2. "That Brilliant Feeling #2" - 3:41
3. "Punch and Judy Man" - 3:51
4. "Disneyworld" - 2:47

=== When Will You (Make My Telephone Ring) (US release) (1988) ===
7" Single (Columbia CSK1215)

1. "When Will You (Make My Telephone Ring) [Edit]" - 4:19
2. "When Will You (Make My Telephone Ring)" - 5:04
