= Trampolene =

Single by Julian Cope

from the album Saint Julian
- B-side: "Disaster"
- Released: 1987
- Genre: Neo-psychedelia
- Length: 3:38
- Label: Island
- Songwriter: Julian Cope
- Producer: Warne Livesey

Julian Cope singles chronology
"World Shut Your Mouth" (1986)	"Trampolene" (1987)	"Eve's Volcano (Covered in Sin)" (1987)

Professional ratings
Review scores
Source	Rating
Allmusic	3/5 stars

"Trampolene" is a song by the English singer-songwriter Julian Cope. It is the second single released in support of his third album Saint Julian.

== Reception ==
Mat Snow of NME said, ""Trampoline" is a gas, better even than "World Shut Your Mouth". Bold, action- packed yet bearing the characteristic wistfulness of the unrequited comic romantic hero, this bursts with an opulent conviction that makes you feel two feet taller just to hear it. Already the tub is too small for the both of us. Magnificent."

== Formats and track listing ==
All songs written by Julian Cope.

UK 7" single (IS 305)

1. "Trampolene" – 3:38
2. "Disaster" – 4:58

UK 12" single (12 IS 305)

1. "Trampolene" – 3:38
2. "Disaster" – 4:58
3. "Mock Turtle" – 4:23
4. "Warwick the Kingmaker" – 3:52

UK 12" remix single" single (12 ISX 305)

1. "Trampolene" [Remix by Warne Livesey - Long Version] – 5:53
2. "Trampolene" – 3:38
3. "Disaster" – 4:58

== Chart positions ==
Chart (1987)	Peak position
Irish Singles Chart	22
New Zealand Singles Chart	45
UK Singles Chart	31
