= Loaded (Deacon Blue song) =

- Cover of 7" single

Single by Deacon Blue

from the album Raintown
- B-side: "Long Distance from Just Across the Road"; "Which Side Are You On"; "Kings of the Western World"
- Released: 8 June 1987
- Genre: Pop
- Length: 5:30 (7")
- Label: Columbia
- Songwriters: James Prime, Ricky Ross, Graeme Kelling
- Producer: Jon Kelly

Deacon Blue singles chronology
"Dignity" (1987)	"Loaded" (1987)	"When Will You (Make My Telephone Ring)" (1987)

"Loaded" is a single released by the Scottish band Deacon Blue in 1987.

In an interview given to the Daily Record in 2012, songwriter Ricky Ross explained about "Loaded" that "I’d left the keys to my flat in Glasgow to the guys in the band and they did a backing track on an old 8 track. I came in and started singing stream of consciousness on it, about some of the people we’d met in the record business. Part of the lyric was lifted from an old evangelical children's hymn, "Christ Is The Answer"".

The main B-side, "Long Distance from Just Across the Road", appeared on all versions of the single, which was released on cassette and on 7" and 12" vinyl. Ross has described this stark, echoing song as "[a]n attempt to re-write 'Shore Leave' by Tom Waits." The other songs, "Which Side Are You On" and "Kings of the Western World", appear on the cassette and 12" versions of the single.

== Track listing ==
All songs written by Ricky Ross, except where noted:

7" single (deac 2)

1. "Loaded" (Prime, Ross, Kelling) - 4:30
2. "Long Distance from Just Across the Road" - 2:53

Cassette single (deac c2)

1. "Loaded" (Prime, Ross, Kelling) - 4:30
2. "Long Distance from Just Across the Road" - 2:53
3. "Which Side Are You On" (F. Reece) - 2:59
4. "Kings of the Western World" - 2:39

12" single (deac t2)

1. "Loaded (Full Length Version)" (Prime, Ross, Kelling)
2. "Long Distance from Just Across the Road" - 2:53
3. "Which Side Are You On" (F. Reece) - 2:59
4. "Kings of the Western World" - 2:39

== Charts ==
=== Weekly charts ===
Chart (1987)	Peak position
Italy Airplay (Music & Media)	14
