= Dignity (Deacon Blue song) =

- Original 7-inch single picture sleeve

Single by Deacon Blue

from the album Raintown
- B-side: "Riches"
- Released: March 1987
- Recorded: 1986
- Genre: Pop rock
- Length: 4:00
- Label: Columbia
- Songwriter: Ricky Ross
- Producer: Jon Kelly

Deacon Blue singles chronology
| "Dignity" (1987) | "Loaded" (1987) |

"Dignity" is a song by Deacon Blue, which was the band's first official release. It is one of their most popular songs and it is usually played as the final song at concerts. It received the most public votes for the 1980s songs in the Scotland's Greatest Album contest run by STV in 2011, and was featured on the 12 track compilation. It was also sung at the closing ceremony at the 2014 Commonwealth Games held in Glasgow.

In an interview given to the Daily Record in 2012, songwriter Ricky Ross stated, "I have no idea why I started writing a song like that in Greece, but that's why there's a reference to raki in it, the local firewater. I was sitting messing around with lyrics, bored on holiday, in a far away scene. There were men from the Glasgow cleansing department depot who walked up and down the street with brushes outside my flat in Pollokshields."

== Use in sport ==
The supporters of Scottish football team Dundee United frequently sing "Dignity" as an anthem. Dundee United player Tony Watt has expressed his love for the song. He states "That rendition of Dignity tonight was epic! Get it on after every game!" and "Top 3 memory this, normalise Dignity every game."

The song is also regularly played at stock car racing events at Cowdenbeath Racewall, especially at the annual memorial race in tribute to Raymond Gunn, a driver who lost his life at the venue in 2003.

== Multiple releases ==
"Dignity" has been officially released as a single three times. It was first released as the lead single of the band's first album Raintown. The single failed to chart in the UK, although it did reach the lower region of the charts in the Netherlands, and sales on the album were slow to start. The 12" version of the first release featured a different vocal and alternate lyrics. After the release of two subsequent singles, "Dignity" was re-recorded in November 1987 by Bob Clearmountain and re-released in January 1988 as the fourth single (and second release of "Dignity"). The second release charted on the UK Singles Chart and its success helped increase sales of Raintown.

"Dignity" was released for a third time as the second single from Deacon Blue's first greatest hits compilation Our Town - The Greatest Hits. During the third release, two companion CD singles were released—one with the original version of "Dignity" and one with the Bob Clearmountain re-recording.

== Track listings ==
All songs written by Ricky Ross, except where noted:

=== Dignity (1st release) (March 1987) ===
7" single (Deac 1)

1. "Dignity" - 4:00
2. "Riches" - 2:39

Cassette single (XPC 4011) (packaged with 7" single)

1. "Dignity" - 4:00
2. "Riches" - 2:39
3. Edited excerpts of songs from Raintown

12" single (Deac t1)

1. "Dignity (12" Version)"
2. "Riches" (12" Version)"
3. "Ribbons and Bows" - 4:18

=== Dignity (2nd release) (January 1988) ===
7" single (Deac 4)

1. "Dignity [Bob Clearmountain recording]" - 4:13
2. "Suffering" - 2:44

7" extended play single (Deac ep4)

1. "Dignity [Bob Clearmountain recording]" - 4:13
2. "Suffering" - 2:44
3. "Raintown (Piano Version)" - 3:40
4. "Ronnie Spector" (Ross, Kelling, Prime) - 3:29

10" single (Deac q4)

1. "Dignity [Bob Clearmountain recording]" - 4:13
2. "Suffering" - 2:44
3. "Shifting Sand" (Ross, Prime) - 3:18

12" single (Deac t4)

1. "Dignity [Bob Clearmountain recording] (Extended Version)"
2. "Just Like Boys" (Ross, Prime) - 3:13
3. "Shifting Sand" (Ross, Prime) - 3:18
4. "Ronnie Spector" (Ross, Kelling, Prime) - 3:29

CD single (CDDeac 4)

1. "Dignity [Bob Clearmountain recording]"
2. "Suffering" - 2:44
3. "Just Like Boys" (Ross, Prime) - 3:13
4. "Shifting Sand" (Ross, Prime) - 3:18

=== Dignity (3rd release) (May 1994) ===
Cassette single (660448 4)

1. "Dignity [Bob Clearmountain recording]" - 4:16
2. "Beautiful Stranger" (Ross, Prime) - 3:54

CD single A (660448 2)

1. "Dignity [Bob Clearmountain recording]" - 4:16
2. "Beautiful Stranger" (Ross, Prime) - 3:54
3. "Waves of Sorrow (Piano and Vocal Version)" - 3:25
4. "Bethlehem's Gate (Piano and Vocal Version)" - 3:33

CD single B (660448 5)

1. "Dignity" - 4:03
2. "Fergus Sings the Blues (Live from the Hammersmith Odeon, 22.04.93)" (Ross, Prime) - 4:10
3. "Loaded (Live from the Hammersmith Odeon, 22.04.93)" - 3:51
4. "Chocolate Girl (Live from the Hammersmith Odeon, 22.04.93) [with "My Girl" melody]" - 6:22

== Charts ==
=== Weekly charts ===
| Chart (1987) | Peak position |
|---|---|
| Dutch GfK chart | 45 |
| Italy Airplay (Music & Media) | 15 |

| Chart (1988) | Peak position |
|---|---|
| UK Singles Chart | 31 |
| US Billboard Mainstream Rock Tracks | 22 |

| Chart (1994) | Peak position |
|---|---|
| UK Singles Chart | 20 |

== Certifications ==
| Region | Certification | Certified units/sales |
|---|---|---|
| United Kingdom (BPI) | Gold | 400,000^{‡} |
^{‡} Sales+streaming figures based on certification alone.
