= Graeme Kelling =

Scottish musician (1957–2004)

- Kelling performing in Glasgow, 2001

Background information
- Born: Graeme Hunter Kelling; 4 April 1957; Paisley, Renfrewshire, Scotland
- Origin: Motherwell, Lanarkshire, Scotland
- Died: 10 June 2004 (aged 47) Glasgow, Scotland
- Instrument: Guitar
- Years active: 1980-2004
- Formerly of: Deacon Blue
- Spouse: Julie Smith (m. 1997)

Graeme Hunter Kelling (4 April 1957 – 10 June 2004) was a Scottish musician and the original guitarist with the Scottish pop rock band Deacon Blue.

== Early life ==
Born in Paisley, Kelling was brought up in Motherwell and attended the High School of Glasgow. Born into the Plymouth Brethren sect, he turned away from it in order to travel and to follow music.

== Career ==
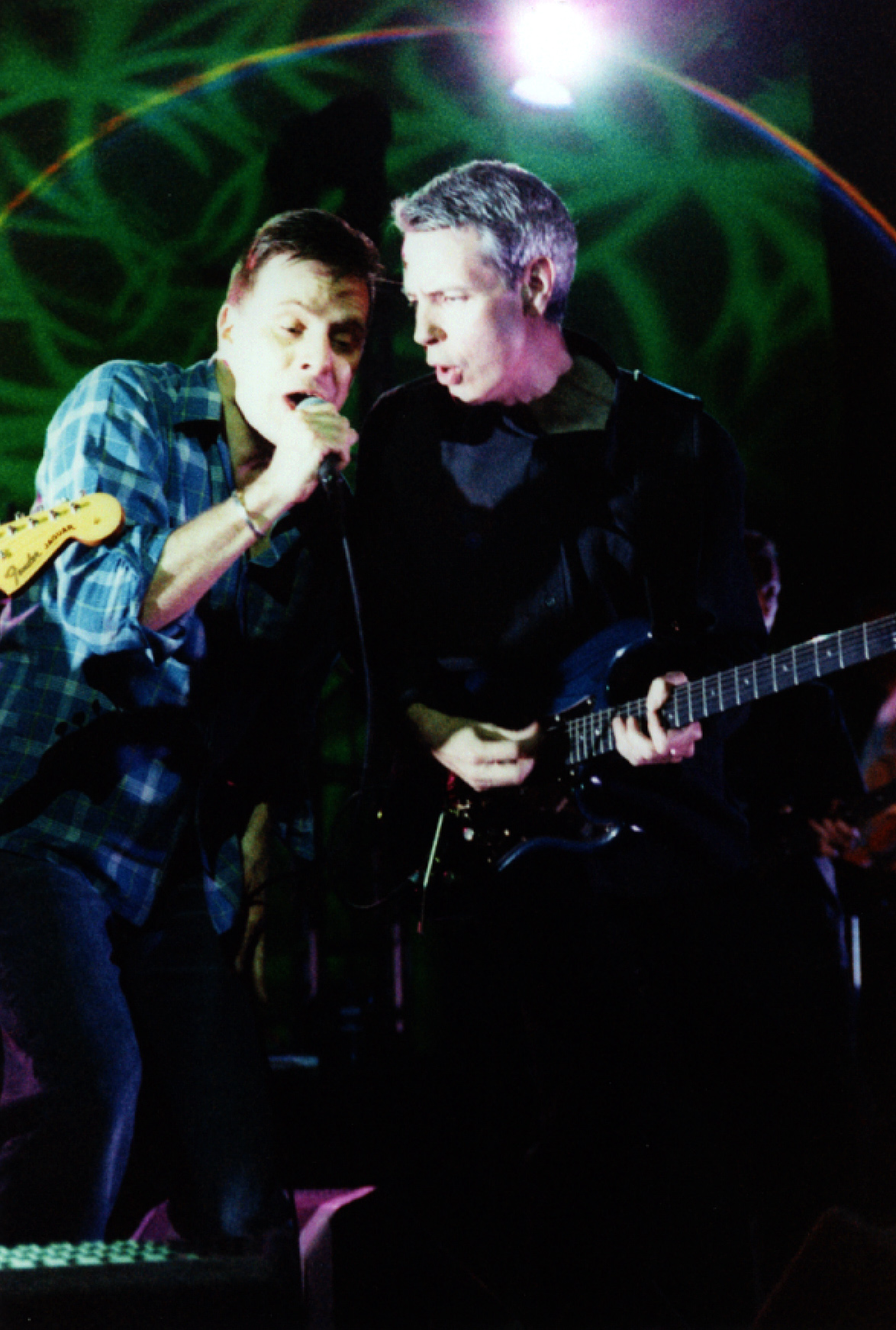
Kelling and Ricky Ross performing with Deacon Blue at the SEC Centre in Glasgow, 2001

In the early 1980s, he worked with various bands in the Glasgow rock music scene (Note: Kelling was a member of Tune Cookies, On a Clear Day, Precious, and the Painted Word) as both a member and a session guitarist. Kelling successfully joined Deacon Blue in 1986, and co-wrote their 1987 single "Loaded" and the B-side "Ronnie Spector" (the latter from the second single release of "Dignity"). He played on the first four Deacon Blue albums – Raintown, When the World Knows Your Name, Fellow Hoodlums and Whatever You Say, Say Nothing – before the band's first split in 1994.

Following the end of his first stint with Deacon Blue, Kelling ran a recording studio and wrote soundtrack and incidental music for film and television. He also took on work as a prose writer, contributing restaurant reviews to The List and travel writing to Peter Irvine's guide book Scotland the Best. Kelling rejoined Deacon Blue in May 1999, and despite being diagnosed with pancreatic cancer early in 2000, continued working with the band until his death in 2004; contributing to the albums Walking Back Home and Homesick.

== Personal life ==
Kelling married radio and television producer Julie Smith in 1997. The couple had two children, Alexander and Grace.

Four years after being diagnosed with pancreatic cancer, Kelling died in 2004 in Glasgow, at the age of 47.

== Discography ==
=== with Deacon Blue ===
==== Studio albums ====
- Raintown (1987)
- When the World Knows Your Name (1989)
- Fellow Hoodlums (1991)
- Whatever You Say, Say Nothing (1993)
- Walking Back Home (1999)
- Homesick (2001)

==== Compilation albums ====
- Ooh Las Vegas (1990)
