= Twist and Shout (Deacon Blue song) =

1991 single by Deacon Blue

Single by Deacon Blue

from the album Fellow Hoodlums
- B-side: "Good"; "Golden Bells"; "I'm Down"
- Released: 15 July 1991
- Length: 3:32
- Label: Columbia
- Songwriter: Ricky Ross
- Producer: Jon Kelly

Deacon Blue singles chronology
"Your Swaying Arms" (1990)	"Twist and Shout" (1991)	"Closing Time" (1991)

Music video
- "Twist and Shout" on YouTube

"Twist and Shout" is a song by Scottish rock band Deacon Blue, released in July 1991 by Columbia Records as the second single from their third album, Fellow Hoodlums (1991). The song is written by Ricky Ross and produced by Jon Kelly. It reached No. 10 in the UK Singles Chart in August 1991 and No. 13 on the Irish Singles Chart

== Title and release ==
"Twist and Shout" is not the same song originally performed by the Top Notes. The 12-inch single of Deacon Blue's release contains a live cover of the Beatles' "I'm Down". The single's primary B-side is the song "Good". Some versions of the single include an additional B-side entitled "Golden Bells".

== Track listings ==
All songs written by Ricky Ross, except where noted:

- 7-inch and cassette single (657302 7; 657302 4)
1. "Twist and Shout"
2. "Good"
- 12-inch single (657302 6)
1. "Twist and Shout" (extended version)
2. "Good"
3. "Twist and Shout"
4. "I'm Down" (live) (Lennon, McCartney)
- CD single (657302 2)
1. "Twist and Shout"
2. "Good"
3. "Golden Bells"

== Charts ==
=== Weekly charts ===
Chart (1991)	Peak position
Europe (European Hit Radio)	19
Ireland (IRMA)	13
Luxembourg (Radio Luxembourg)	8
UK Singles (OCC)	10
UK Airplay (Music Week)	4

=== Year-end charts ===
Chart (1991)	Position
UK Singles (OCC)	96
