= A. J. Weberman =

American writer

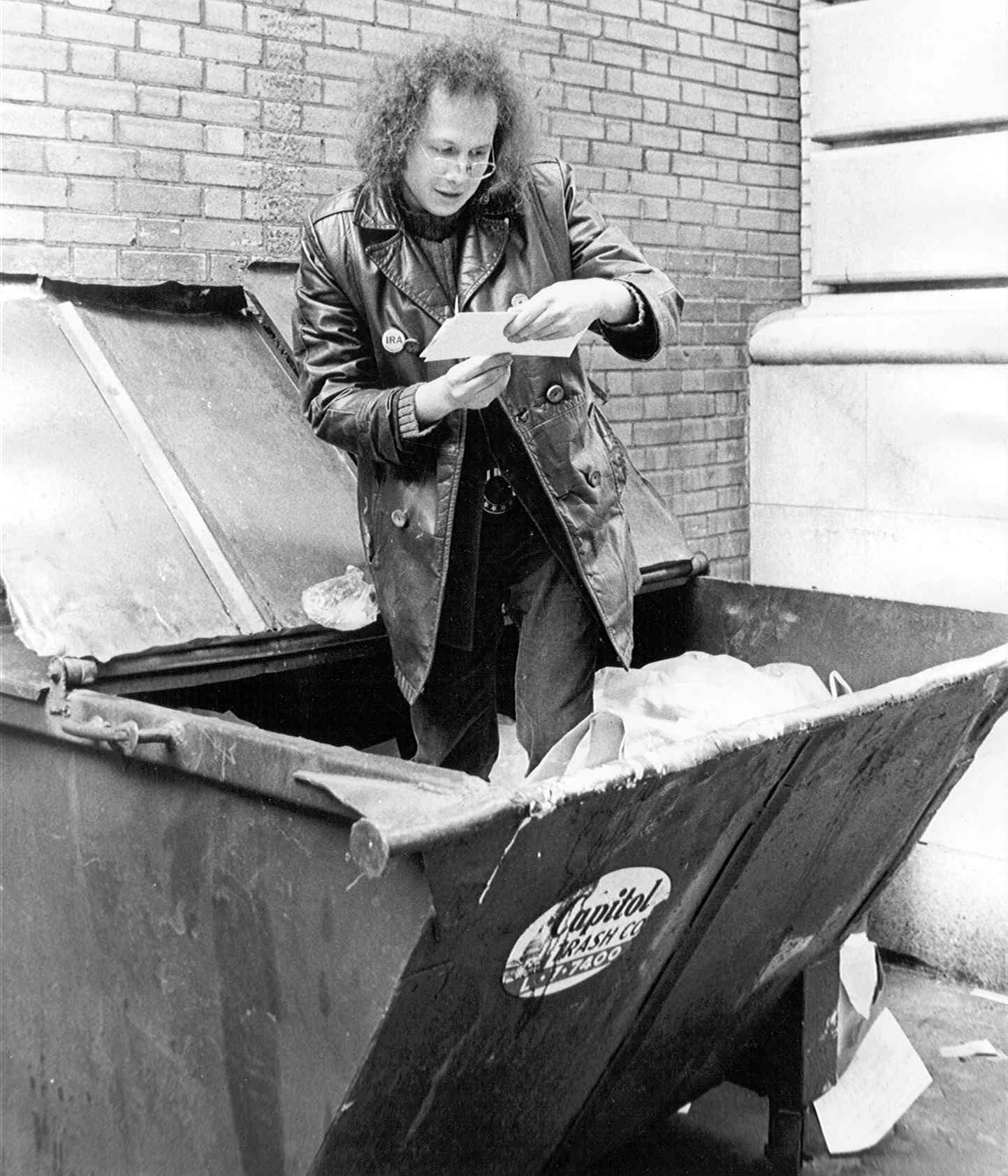
Weberman in the 1970s

Alan Jules Weberman (born May 26, 1945) is an American writer, political activist, gadfly, inventor of the terms "garbology" and "Dylanology" and known as the prototype celebrity stalker. He is best known for his controversial opinions on, and personal interactions with, the musician Bob Dylan. Together with New York folk singer David Peel, Weberman founded the Rock Liberation Front in 1971 with the aim of "liberating" artists from bourgeois tendencies and ensuring that rock musicians continued to engage with and represent the counterculture of the 1960s.

== Early life ==
Weberman was born to Jewish parents in Brooklyn, New York in 1945. As a boy, he served as president of a local fan club dedicated to the professional wrestler Haystacks Calhoun. He has recalled that his father, who enjoyed antagonizing his wife, regularly inspected the household garbage to ensure that Weberman's mother had not bought non-kosher food.

During the early 1960s, Weberman attended Michigan State University. While there, in 1964, he was arrested for selling marijuana and briefly served 2 days in jail before being released. He then returned to New York and worked as an interviewer for the Lawrence Employment Agency while continuing his studies, at night school, at City College of New York.

== Bob Dylan ==
Weberman has written on the life and works of Bob Dylan, including a pamphlet titled Dylanology in 1969 and creating a word concordance of Dylan's lyrics. He also wrote the Dylan to English Dictionary, published in 2005. One of Weberman's theories on Dylan's songwriting is that some of Dylan's songs are actually about, or addressed to, Weberman himself. Authors Bob Spitz and Jim Curtis have each rejected, and ridiculed, Weberman's interpretations of Dylan's work.

In 1969, Weberman founded the Dylan Liberation Front with associates such as street musician David Peel, aiming "to help save Bob Dylan from himself". Weberman was convinced that, from Dylan's docile, smiling visage on the cover of his 1969 album Nashville Skyline, the singer was hiding from his social conscience and ignoring his responsibilities as a political spokesman for the counterculture. Once Dylan had moved back to Greenwich Village from Upstate New York in 1970, Weberman took to rifling through his garbage. That same year, Weberman began lecturing in Dylanology at the left-wing Alternate University of New York. At this time, the Liberation Front lamented that Dylan had become a "reactionary force in rock", a view that was echoed among the radical left.

Rolling Stone magazine called Weberman "the king of all Dylan nuts"; he has also been described as obsessively stalking Dylan, and Cashmore describes him as the prototype celebrity stalker. Weberman alleged that in late summer 1971, Dylan – annoyed that Weberman had reneged on their agreement that he would no longer dig through his garbage – assaulted Weberman by pushing him on Elizabeth Street in Manhattan. In a 1997 article, Rolling Stone reported that Weberman, "a man that terrorized Bob Dylan during the '60s", had now "returned to hassle his son", Jakob Dylan. Weberman claimed that the younger Dylan was a heroin addict. In 1977, Weberman's telephone conversations with Dylan from the early 1970s were released on the Folkways Records album Bob Dylan vs A.J. Weberman – The Historic Confrontation.

Writing in 2014 about the phenomenon of "Bob Dylan obsessives", John Dickerson of Slate described Weberman as "the most famous of the Dylanologists". In December 2016, after Dylan received the Nobel Prize in Literature, Weberman released a video on YouTube in which he claimed credit for Dylan's achievement. Journalist John Semley, writing for Salon, views Weberman's claim as far-fetched yet also identifies "a scrap of truth in it".

== Rock Liberation Front ==
Weberman and the Dylan Liberation Front ceased their scrutiny of Dylan, temporarily, after he performed at George Harrison's Concert for Bangladesh shows at Madison Square Garden on August 1, 1971. Weberman was satisfied with Dylan's reversion to his 1960s protest singer persona and his scruffy attire at the concerts. Together with Peel, he formed the Rock Liberation Front (RLF) to "establish a relationship of understanding and participation in the World of Rock", which had "been getting ripped off too long". They first targeted Paul McCartney, whose recent music showed he was "just a businessman" and "a good example of the capitalist, non-involved egotistical rock star", according to Weberman. The RLF held a mock funeral for McCartney, on August 26, outside the Park Avenue home of his lawyer and father-in-law, Lee Eastman. Reporting on the event a week later in The Village Voice, Blair Sabol opined that Weberman's strategy was becoming overfamiliar: "Being the foremost Dylanologist, or garbageologist, was brilliant for last year's routine, but revamping it for Paul McCartney as this year's 'capitalist pig' campaign is like giving an encore after the audience has gone home." The RLF also protested against Led Zeppelin for demanding $75,000 per concert performance.

Weberman's idealism resonated with John Lennon, who had recently moved to Greenwich Village with his artist wife, Yoko Ono, and embarked on radical left activism under the guidance of activist Jerry Rubin. Lennon espoused Weberman's principles in his interactions with the music press, stating that he was dedicated to making politically motivated music without a thought for commercial gain. In early December, the RLF demonstrated outside Capitol Records, protesting the company's delay in releasing the live album from the Concert for Bangladesh after Harrison had accused Capitol of refusing to distribute the record at cost price. During the protest, Weberman announced that Lennon and Ono had joined the Liberation Front, which he defined as "a group dedicated to exposing hip capitalist counterculture ripoffs and politicizing rock music and rock artists".

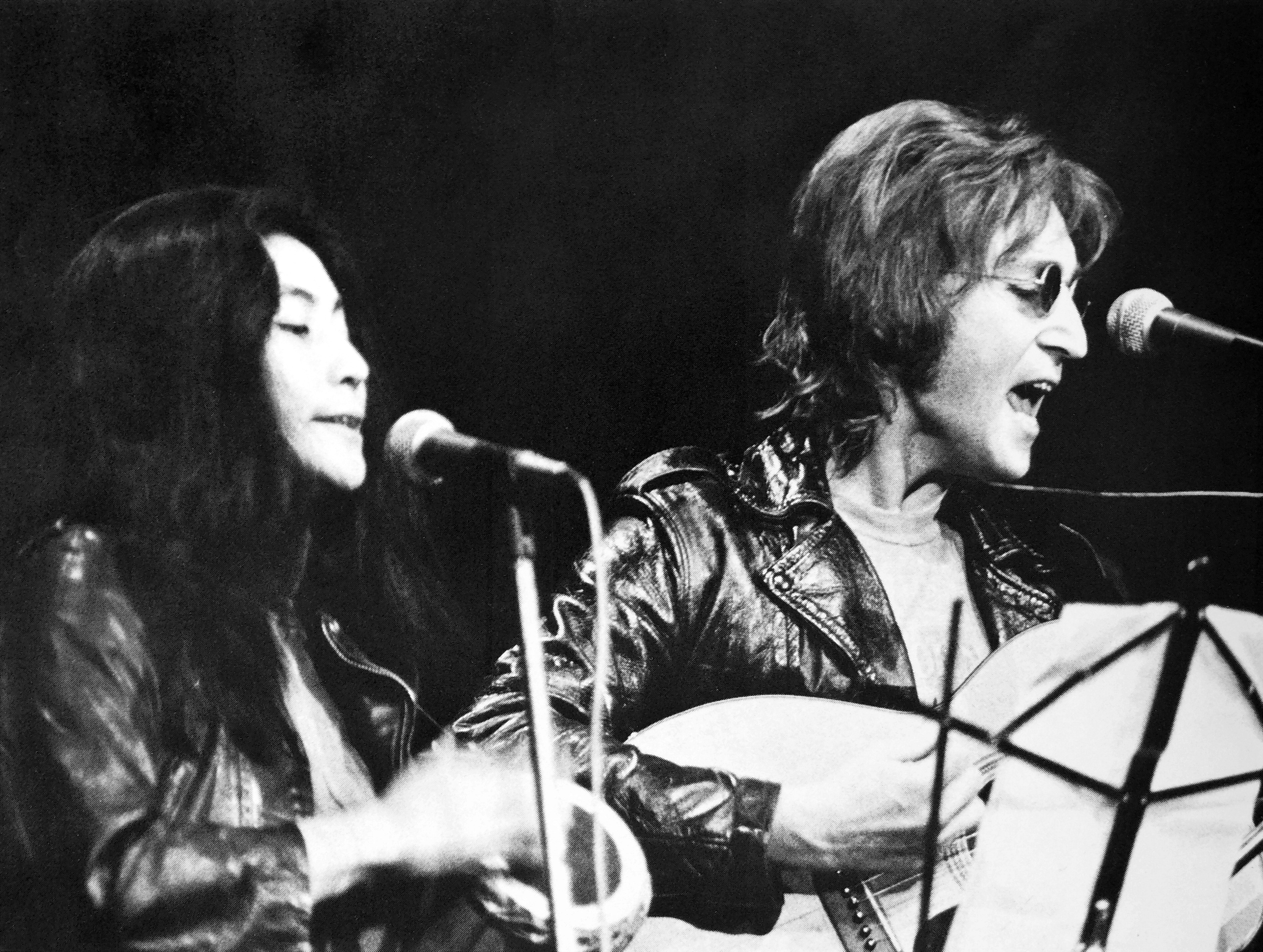
Yoko Ono and John Lennon performing at the John Sinclair Freedom Rally in December 1971

Through Lennon, Rubin came to be involved with the RLF, and soon sidelined Weberman. In his speech at the freedom rally for the imprisoned poet and activist John Sinclair, on December 10, 1971, where Lennon, Ono and Peel were among the performers, Rubin described the event as "the first act of the Rock Liberation Front".

Lennon, Ono and Rubin also planned a US tour that would use their political message to unite the nation's young voters and thwart President Nixon's campaign for re-election in 1972. Lennon and Rubin were intent on enlisting Dylan for the tour and so issued an open letter on behalf of the RLF, demanding that Weberman publicly apologize to Dylan for the print and radio campaign he had waged against the singer and for describing him as a junkie. Published in The Village Voice, the letter also stated that all those in the movement should "[save] our anger for the true enemy, whose ignorance and greed destroys our planet", and led to the RLF becoming an organization of interest to the FBI. Author Peter Doggett likens this demand to a forced confession in "Stalin's Russia", since Rubin had openly supported the underground publications that ran Weberman's stories, and Weberman had been among the first to accept Dylan's post-Bangladesh single, "George Jackson", as a worthy return to the protest style. Weberman nevertheless issued an apology "for past untrue statements and also the harassment of Bob Dylan and his family", and signed it: "A.J. Weberman, Minister of Defence, Rock Liberation Front".

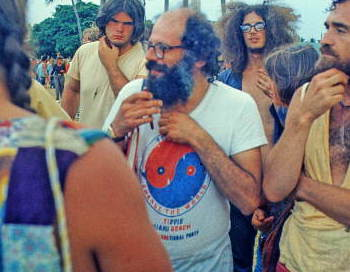
New York poet and activist Allen Ginsberg among the protestors at the 1972 Republican National Convention in Miami

Weberman regained his leadership of the RLF in February 1972, when the group "liberated" the offices of Lennon and Harrison's business manager, Allen Klein, at 1700 Broadway. The event was a press conference in which Klein attempted to respond to allegations made in New York magazine, and partly supported in Rolling Stone, that he had pocketed funds intended for the Bangladeshi refugees from the sale of the Concert for Bangladesh album. Chanting "You'll wonder where the money went, when Klein runs a charity event", the protestors disrupted the press conference and gained further exposure for Klein's alleged fraud in Variety, Rolling Stone and The Village Voice. Surprisingly for Weberman, this resulted in an invitation from Lennon and Ono for him to visit them at their Bank Street apartment, where the couple confided that Klein was "ripping us off too". According to Weberman, he introduced Lennon to a group of supporters and financiers for the IRA, to whom Lennon made a generous financial contribution.

Lennon's direct role in political activism soon waned, although he continued to finance activities by Weberman and Peel. The latter recorded an album, The Pope Smokes Dope, which was produced by Lennon and Ono, and released on Apple Records in April 1972. Lennon also donated $50,000 to pay for demonstrators' travel expenses to Miami, Florida, where Weberman helped to stage a mass protest against Nixon at the Republican National Convention in August.

== Coup D'Etat in America: The CIA and the Assassination of JFK ==
In 1975, Weberman wrote Coup D'Etat in America: The CIA and the Assassination of JFK with Michael Canfield. According to one account, "Canfield and Weberman propose a basic theory on the assassination, revolving around the CIA and the Bay of Pigs fiasco, and then use the bulk of the book to document and substantiate their allegations." According to Weberman and Canfield, the CIA planned the assassination of Kennedy because he had agreed to stop the Cuban exiles' anti-Castro operations. Among the book's contentions are that Lee Harvey Oswald was a patsy and that two of the "three tramps" photographed by several Dallas-area newspapers under police escort near the Texas School Book Depository shortly after the assassination Kennedy were Watergate burglars E. Howard Hunt and Frank Sturgis. Coup D'Etat in America was reported to influence United States House of Representatives member Henry B. Gonzalez to initiate a resolution that would result in the formation of the House Select Committee on Assassinations.

A reviewer for The Harvard Crimson wrote: "Despite its lapses into obsessive speculations about connections between irrelevant figures and dubious arguments by analogy of modus operandi, Coup d'Etat is a chillingly convincing book."

Coup d'Etat in America reiterated Tad Szulc's allegation that Hunt was the acting chief of the CIA station in Mexico City in 1963 while Lee Harvey Oswald was there. (Note: Szulc wrote: "As I mentioned above, Hunt spent August and September 1963 in Mexico City in charge of the CIA station there.") In July 1976, Hunt filed a $2.5 million libel suit against Weberman and Canfield, as well as the book's publishers and editor. Six years later in 1982 Hunt dropped the libel suit.

== Other activities ==
In 2002, Weberman, along with the Jewish Defense Organization, and JDO chief Mordechai Levy, were successfully sued for libel in Brooklyn, New York. The jury stated that Weberman was responsible for $300,000 of the $850,000 judgement. The judgment was overturned on appeal.

In 2005, Weberman worked with Yippies including Dana Beal and Pie Man Aron Kay to turn the long-time Yippie headquarters at 9 Bleecker Street on Manhattan's Lower East Side into a counterculture museum. As of February 2006, renovation of the building was partially completed, and a charter from the New York State Board of Regents was granted. The museum, which Weberman likened to a "Hard Rock Cafe for Yippies", would house the remains of Jerry Rubin's roadkill (Rubin was killed by a car) and Abbie Hoffman's trash.

In 2006, Weberman, along with some of his former students, appeared in a documentary film about his exploits as a Dylanologist, titled The Ballad of AJ Weberman. The film includes a performance by Peel and Weberman of "The Ballad of A. J. Weberman", a tribute song that Peel recorded for his 1974 album Santa Claus Rooftop Junkie.

== Published works ==
=== Articles ===
- "Dylan's Movie: How Success Ruined His Sex Life." High Times, no. 33 (May 1978).

=== Books ===
- Dylanology. Hong Kong: Whitepress Corp. (1969).
- Concordance to the Songs, Poetry, and Assorted Writings of Bob Dylan. New York: Private printing (1971).
- Coup D'Etat in America: The CIA and the Assassination of JFK, with Michael Canfield. Foreword by Congressman Henry B. Gonzalez. New York: The Third Press (1975). ISBN 978-0932551108.
  - Republished: San Francisco, Calif.: Quick American Archives (1992). ISBN 978-0932551108.
- My Life in Garbology. New York: Stonehill Press (1980). ISBN 978-0883730966.

"A study in famous people's garbage by the enigmatic founder of garbology and the National Institute of Garbology himself."

- Dylan to English Dictionary. New York: Yippie Museum Press (2005). ISBN 978-1419613388.
- RightWing Bob: What the Liberal Media Doesn't Want You to Know about Bob Dylan. BookSurge Publishing (2009). ISBN 978-1439256152.
- Homothug: The Secret Life of Rudy Giuliani. New York: Yippie Museum Press.
- Ron Paul: America's Most Dangerous Nazi. Scott's Valley, Calif.: CreateSpace (2012). ISBN 978-1470014537.
- The Oswald Code (2018).

=== Interviews ===
- "Dylan Meets Weberman". East Village Other (January 19, 1971). p. centerfold.
