= The Unruly Imagination =

Studio album by Julian Cope
- Released: April 2009
- Genre: Rock, neofolk
- Length: 50:31
- Label: Head Heritage
- Producer: Julian Cope

Julian Cope chronology
Black Sheep (2008)	The Unruly Imagination (2009)	The Jehovahcoat Demos (2011)

The Unruly Imagination is the twenty-fifth solo album by Julian Cope, released in 2009.

It was recorded with musicians from Cope's side project Black Sheep and released in a limited edition. Released to coincide with a one-day event of the same name, organized by Cope, dedicated to democracy, protest and free speech at Manchester University's Whitworth Gallery. The album is a collection of new songs especially recorded for this project plus two songs from an unreleased EP Diggers, Ranters, Levellers. "Preaching Revolution", "Mother, Where Is My Father?", "I Wanna Know What's in it For Me" and "Fuck Me U.S.A." were previously released as the vinyl only 7” EP Preaching Revolution by Julian Cope & Black Sheep in 2008.

"Mother, Where Is My Father?" was originally recorded by David Peel & The Lower East Side on their 1968 album Have a Marijuana.

== Track listing ==
All tracks are written by Julian Cope, except where noted.

No.	Title	Length
1.	"Preaching Revolution"	7:12
2.	"Militant Feminist Dream"	3:13
3.	"Mother, Where Is My Father?" (David Peel)	2:34
4.	"I Wanna Know What's in It for Me"	2:20
5.	"Fuck Me U.S.A."	2:13
6.	"Gang of Four (At Home He Feels Like a Tourist)"	4:06
7.	"Alexei Sayle Driver Improvement Course"	2:36
8.	"Creedist Blues"	4:06
9.	"James Nayler Enters Bristol on a Donkey: 1656"	5:03
10.	"Chairman Mao"	14:05
11.	"Spitfire Boys (British Refugee)"	3:20
Total length:		50:31

Poetry (printed in booklet)
No.	Title	Length
1.	"Even Your Shit is Political"
2.	"Democrats"

== Personnel ==
Musicians

- Julian Cope
- Christopher Patrick "Holy" McGrail
- Ady "Acoustika" Fletcher
- Michael O'Sullivan
- Big Nige
- Chris "Christophe F." Farrell
- Adam "Randy Apostle" Whittaker
- Paul "Fat Paul" Horlick
- Ian "Mister E." Bissett
- David Wrench

Technical

- Produced by Julian Cope
- Recorded by Adam Whittaker, David Wrench, Stuart "7stu7" Matthews
- Design by Holy McGrail
