= The American Revolution (album) =

Studio album by David Peel & The Lower East Side
- Released: February 1970
- Genre: Garage rock; proto-punk; folk rock
- Length: 27:56
- Label: Elektra
- Producer: Peter K. Siegel

David Peel chronology
Have a Marijuana (1968)	The American Revolution (1970)	The Pope Smokes Dope (1972)

Professional ratings
Review scores
Source	Rating
Allmusic	4/5 stars
Rolling Stone	(Negative)

The American Revolution is the debut studio album and second overall album by David Peel and The Lower East Side, released in 1970 through Elektra Records.

== Track listing ==
All tracks are written by David Peel, except where noted.

Side one
No.	Title	Writer(s)	Length
1.	"Lower East Side"	Billy Joe White	3:14
2.	"Pledge of Allegiance"		0:35
3.	"Legalize Marijuana"		2:52
4.	"Oink, Oink"		4:30
5.	"I Want to Get High"		2:27

Side two
No.	Title	Writer(s)	Length
1.	"I Want to Kill You"		4:18
2.	"Girls, Girls, Girls"		3:55
3.	"Hey, Mr. Draft Board"	Al De Lory, Fred Darian, Joseph Van Winkle	3:42
4.	"God"		2:23

== Personnel ==
Musicians

- Tony Bartoli – drums
- Harold C. Black – vocals, tambourine
- Herb Bushler – bass guitar
- Richard Grando – soprano saxophone
- David Horowitz – organ
- David Peel – vocals, guitar
- Billy Joe White – vocals, guitar

Production and additional personnel

- Joel Brodsky – photography
- William S. Harvey – art direction
- Robert L. Heimall – design
- Stephen Y. Scheaffer – engineering
- Peter K. Siegel – production, mixing, recording
