= Mordechai Levy =

American political activist

Mark "Mordechai" Levy
- Born: Mark Levy; United States
- Occupation: Political activist
- Organization: Jewish Defense Organization
- Known for: Founder of the Jewish Defense Organization
- Criminal charges: Felony assault (1989)
- Criminal penalty: 18 months imprisonment

Mark "Mordechai" Levy is a U.S.-based political activist and founder of the militant Jewish Defense Organization (JDO), a breakaway faction of the Jewish Defense League. David Tell of the Weekly Standard wrote that the group is "located at the farthest, shadowy margins of American public life." Levy has organized a paramilitary training camp located in Upstate New York, named after Revisionist Zionist leader Vladimir Jabotinsky.

== Early attention ==
Levy first came to public attention after he was arrested in 1981 in Los Angeles on a charge of firebombing a Nigerian diplomat's car that was parked near the Soviet U.N. Mission. Three days earlier, Levy was arrested after attacking a Latvian, alleged to be a Nazi war criminal, in a courtroom as he was fighting deportation.

== Jewish Defense Organization ==
By the mid-1980s, Levy had left the Jewish Defense League to form the Jewish Defense Organization. In 1985, after a bomb at the Santa Ana, California offices of the American Arab Anti-Discrimination Committee killed its West Coast director, Alex Odeh, both the Jewish Defense League and the Jewish Defense Organization came under investigation by the Federal Bureau of Investigation. Two weeks earlier, according to The New York Times, The American-Arab Anti-Discrimination Committee's New York office appeared on a list entitled "Enemies of the Jewish People" handed out in Washington, DC by Levy. Levy was quoted in a UPI report denying responsibility for the murder: "We had no hand in this, but this man deserved what he got." Asked about the attacks by the New York Times, Levy said "We aren't claiming credit, but it couldn't happen to better people, more deserving people. They're getting a taste of their own medicine."

Levy was charged with four counts of attempted murder and other charges after he opened fire on late JDL leader Irv Rubin in 1989, hitting an innocent bystander. Rubin was attempting to serve a subpoena on Levy. Levy was acquitted of all charges except one count of felony assault with a deadly weapon, for which he served 18 months of a 4½ year sentence. Levy pleaded guilty in 2000 to unrelated charges that he assaulted a 12-year-old boy in New York State.

Levy collects information on neo-Nazis, the KKK and Arab organizations. A 1989 Village Voice article on Jewish militants reported:

His [Levy's] uncanny ability to track down KKK members and neo-Nazis astounded federal officials. 'Levy does appear to possess membership lists of neo-Nazi groups and KKK members across the U.S.,' a confidential FBI memorandum reported."

== Greensboro massacre ==
After the massacre of five left-wing anti-Klan demonstrators by Klansmen and neo-Nazis in Greensboro, N.C. in 1979 (an incident known as the Greensboro massacre), Levy came forward with information to help the victims in their attempt to win justice, despite disagreeing with their Marxist politics. Paul Bermanzohn, one of the survivors of the neo-Nazi attack, recalled the efforts to establish in court that the FBI had possessed advance knowledge of the plot:

"Most incriminating of all was an affidavit from Mordechai Levy of the Jewish Defense Organization. When Levy got his FBI file through the Freedom of Information Act, he found an entry dated November 2, 1979, the day before the massacre. In it, the FBI reported that Levy told one of their agents, 'I have information that Harold Covington of the National Socialist Party of America is up to heavy illegal activity. Covington has been training in the Jefferson County area with illegal weapons. He and his group have plans to attack and possibly kill people at an anti-Klan gathering this week in North Carolina.'"

== LaRouche ==
Levy infiltrated the Lyndon LaRouche organization on a part-time basis from 1980–84 as a security consultant and supplied disinformation that convinced some of LaRouche's security staffers of plots against their leader. After Levy revealed his deception, the LaRouchians described him as a "chaos agent."

Levy has said that the JDO has a membership of 3,000 members, but monitors of Jewish extremist groups say only about a dozen people are actively involved at any one time. A 1992 feature in the Jerusalem Report notes that "Journalists and extremist-group monitors who have followed Levy's career say the Jewish Defense Organization exists mainly in his mind, that his hardcore following is at most a few dozen Orthodox teenagers."

== David Duke ==
In 1989, Levy traveled to Louisiana to attempt to disrupt the campaign of David Duke, the former Klan leader, for the state legislature. An initial rally planned for the Congregation Beth Israel was canceled after the synagogue's Rabbi Gavriel Newman noted Levy's statements that the JDO would not rule out violence in its efforts against Duke. Levy held a small rally against Duke the following month. Duke ultimately won in a run-off by 227 votes. Some Jewish leaders held Levy responsible for the victory. According to New Orleans Jewish Federation director Jane Buchsbaum, "there was a strong belief that Mordechai's interference helped create those 227 votes." Leonard Zeskind of the Center for Democratic Renewal, which monitors right-wing extremism, said Levy "went down there and carried on like a character out of central casting for a crazed New York Jew. I'm sure there were 227 people who voted for Duke just to get at Mordechai Levy. I hold him personally responsible for the election of David Duke."

== Rutgers ==
Levy and the JDO's involvement led to accusations that the group inflamed divisions at Rutgers University in 1995, where African American students had protested against comments made by then-President Francis L. Lawrence that were perceived as anti-Black. The JDO accused the protesting Black students of themselves being racist and anti-Semitic. Levy's involvement was met with apprehension by some members of the Rutgers Jewish community. Rabbi Norman Weitzner of Rutgers Hillel felt there was no anti-Semitism involved and noted "The JDO sees anti-Semitism at the drop of a hat, when it may not actually exist." The interim director of Rutgers Hillel said at the time that Levy "thinks he's going to wake up the Jewish students. What's going to happen is that he's going to start a racial war."

== Legal conflicts ==
Levy is also known for his running legal battles with independent licensed investigator and noted electronic privacy researcher Steven Rombom, for which Rombom would ultimately successfully sue Levy and the JDO for in 1997 alleging defamation, false light invasion of privacy, and incitement to violence, for his incessant attacks against ADL founder Abraham Foxman and others. Along with JDO activist A. J. Weberman, also known for his activism in the Youth International Party (Yippies,) Levy and the JDO were successfully sued for libel more recently and fined $850,000.

Levy claims to have done investigative work on such figures as American neo-Nazi Harold Covington and of Steven Hatfill, the one-time person of interest in the yet-unsolved 2001 anthrax attacks; on the apparently ultra orthodox, and self-proclaimed anti-Zionist Rabbi Moshe Aryeh Friedman; and on the reputed Pakistani terror cult Jamaat ul-Fuqra.
