= Santa Claus Rooftop Junkie =

Studio album by David Peel & The Lower East Side
- Released: 1974
- Genre: Contemporary folk; proto-punk
- Length: 42:53
- Label: Orange
- Producer: David Peel

David Peel chronology
The Pope Smokes Dope (1972)	Santa Claus Rooftop Junkie (1974)	An Evening With David Peel (1976)

Professional ratings
Review scores
Source	Rating
Allmusic	4/5 stars

Santa Claus Rooftop Junkie is the fourth studio album by David Peel and The Lower East Side, released in 1974 through Orange Records Ltd.

== Track listing ==
All tracks are written by David Peel.

Side one
No.	Title	Length
1.	"Cockeroach"	2:00
2.	"Smack Freek Blues"	3:48
3.	"Rock 'n' Roll Rip Off"	3:09
4.	"The Narco Is a Pusher"	3:30
5.	"The Schools of Corruption"	5:38
6.	"Santa Claus - Rooftop Junkie"	1:40

Side two
No.	Title	Length
1.	"Who Stole John F. Kennedy's Brain?"	3:37
2.	"I'm Going Insane"	3:38
3.	"The Ballad of A. J. Weberman"	2:20
4.	"Benedict McCartney/Judas Ringo/B. S. Harrison"	7:07
5.	"Watergate (I Didn't Do It)"	3:22
6.	"Jingle Bells War"	2:40

== Personnel ==
- Michael Angelo – guitar, backing vocals
- Les Fradkin – bass guitar, guitar, keyboards, backing vocals
- Andy "Coke" Friedman – drums, percussion
- David Peel – lead vocals, guitar, art direction
- Mark Shatasky – backing vocals
- Ron Skoler – backing vocals
- Paul Thornton – guitar, percussion, backing vocals
- A. J. Weberman – backing vocals, narrator
- Grimes - trumpet

Technical

- Tom Doyle - recording and mixing engineer
