= The Pope Smokes Dope =

Studio album by David Peel & The Lower East Side
- Released: April 17, 1972
- Recorded: 1972
- Studio: Record Plant Studios, New York City
- Genre: Contemporary folk
- Length: 42:01 (vinyl edition); 56:04 (CD edition)
- Label: Apple
- Producer: John Lennon, Yoko Ono

David Peel chronology
The American Revolution (1970)	The Pope Smokes Dope (1972)	Santa Claus Rooftop Junkie (1974)

Professional ratings
Review scores
Source	Rating
Allmusic	4/5 stars
Christgau's Record Guide	E

The Pope Smokes Dope is the third album by David Peel and the Lower East Side, released on April 17, 1972 through Apple Records.

== History ==
Peel, along with John Lennon and Yoko Ono, performed Peel's "The Ballad of New York", on The David Frost Show, with Lennon playing tea-chest bass. The trio, joined by The Lower East Side Band, played several songs by Lennon and Ono. This episode was recorded on December 16, 1971 and broadcast on January 13, 1972.

The album was released on April 17, 1972.

The CD was released in 2005 by Orange Records International.

== Track listing ==
All tracks are written by David Peel.

Side one
No.	Title	Length
1.	"I'm a Runaway"	3:39
2.	"Everybody's Smoking Marijuana"	4:06
3.	"F Is Not a Dirty Word"	3:12
4.	"The Hippie from New York City"	3:01
5.	"McDonald's Farm"	3:13
6.	"The Ballad of New York City/John Lennon • Yoko Ono"	3:19

Side two
No.	Title	Length
1.	"The Ballad of Bob Dylan"	4:12
2.	"The Chicago Conspiracy"	3:47
3.	"The Hip Generation"	1:50
4.	"I'm Gonna Start Another Riot"	2:37
5.	"The Birth Control Blues"	4:48
6.	"The Pope Smokes Dope"	2:15

Bonus tracks on CD edition

13. "Amerika" (Edit) – 4:15
  - with Yoko Ono
14. "How Did You Meet David Peel?" – 2:07
  - interview with John Lennon
15. "Everybody's Smokin'" (Remix) – 7:41

== Chart positions ==
Charts (1972)	Peak position
US Billboard 200	191

== Personnel ==
- Bagtwo (Jeffery Levy) – design, artwork
- Roy Cicala – engineering
- Jack Douglas – engineering
- Bill Ferrara – photography
- Robert L. Heimall – art direction
- Allan Steckler – production supervision
- John Lennon – production, voice (tracks 6 & 12), backing vocals (12)
- Yoko Ono – production, percussions (track 1), voice (6)
- David Peel – vocals, guitar
- Eddie Mottau – guitar
- Chris Osborne – guitar
- Charlie Wolff – guitar
- Eddie Ryan – drums
- The Lower East Side Friends – chorus
- Tom Doyle – guitar, backing vocals
- Bruce Bierman – backing vocals
- John Robertson – guitar
- Billy Minelli – bass
- Frank Lanci – drums
- Lenny Mars – harp (tracks 4 & 7), flutes (1,4,6 & 8), piano (7), percussions (1, 8 & 10), banjo (1, 4 & 7), mandolin (7 & 10)
- Peter Grad and Phil Kane - backup harmonies on first version of "I'm A Runaway" (Cut from album after John Lennon took over production.)
