= The Jehovahcoat Demos =

Compilation album by Julian Cope
- Released: March 2011
- Recorded: 1993
- Genre: Rock; psychedelic rock; post-punk
- Length: 65:45
- Label: Head Heritage
- Producer: Julian Cope

Julian Cope chronology
The Unruly Imagination (2009)	The Jehovahcoat Demos (2011)	Psychedelic Revolution (2012)

The Jehovahcoat Demos is an album by Julian Cope, released in 2011. It is technically Cope's twenty-sixth solo album, and the mostly instrumental album contains 15 previously unreleased tracks, written and recorded by Cope throughout 1993 in direct response to having been dropped by Island Records in October 1992.

The album derives its title from Cope collaborator, multi-instrumentalist Donald Ross Skinner, who, throughout the post-Island Records period, constantly referred to wearing his imaginary 'Jehovahcoat'. This being - according to Skinner - the ultimate Julian Cope promo item.

== Track listing ==
All tracks are written by Julian Cope, except where noted

Phase one
No.	Title	Length
1.	"Boskawen-Un"	4:42
2.	"Hanging Out With Emma Jane When Emma Jane's a Junkie"	0:43
3.	"Sunhoney"	2:58
4.	"Know Alternatives"	2:15
5.	"Preternatural Sitcom"	3:17
6.	"Wrath of Can't"	2:54
7.	"Theme From 'Jehovahcoat'"	2:41

Phase two
No.	Title	Length
8.	"Time and Space"	5:14
9.	"Tyrebagger"	12:49
10.	"Headshopping"	1:55
11.	"El Sqwubbsy's Machu Picchu Revelation"	1:40

Phase three
No.	Title	Length
12.	"Baby, My Mind Stood Up"	3:33
13.	"Riding on the Crest of a Slump"	8:54
14.	"Albany"	8:41
15.	"Julian the Apostate" (Richard Sanderson)	3:35

Note

- "Julian the Apostate" is an adaptation of the unreleased song "Hollow Call" by the short lived British band Drop (1978–79).

== Personnel ==
Musicians

- Julian Cope
- Donald Ross Skinner
- Mark "Rooster" Cosby (credited as "Biff Rooster Biff")
- Shaun Harvey

Technical

- Julian Cope - producer, photography
- Shaun Harvey, Donald Ross Skinner, Tim Lewis - engineer
- Adam Whittaker - mastering
- Holy McGrail - design
