= Woden (album) =

Studio album by Julian Cope
- Released: September 2012
- Recorded: 1998–99
- Genre: Psychedelic, ambient
- Length: 72:45
- Label: Head Heritage
- Producer: Julian Cope

Julian Cope chronology
Psychedelic Revolution (2012)	Woden (2012)	Revolutionary Suicide (2013)

Woden is the twenty-eighth solo album by the English singer and songwriter Julian Cope, recorded in 1998-99 and released in 2012 on Head Heritage. It consists of a 72-minute single movement, self described by Cope as "one enormous meteorological cloud of music originally conceived as a vast and atmospheric 72-minute-long follow-up to his Ur-vocal masterpiece ODIN.

Cope has said that the atmospherics include field music from Avebury and Silbury. The album has been compared to the early, eerie ambient works of Brian Eno and Aphex Twin. The tree on the album cover is a representation of Yggdrasil, and can thus be linked to his Yggdrasil & The Stone of Odin release of 2001.

Woden is perhaps Cope's best 72 minute psychedelic druidistic album. A "single-track-synth-drone-meditation", it is highly regarded by fans of the genre. Cope intended the recording as a "useful meditative aid, but it’s even better for gaining access to the Underworld, the vast weather formations of sound guaranteeing that Hell’s doorway remains open for 72 minutes at a time."

Woden was not a commercial success.

== Track listing ==
All tracks are written by Julian Cope

No.	Title	Length
1.	"Woden"	72:45

== Personnel ==
Adapted from the album's liner notes.

- Julian Cope – VCS3 Putney synthesizer, Mellotron 400, Starchamber 1, Sony CFS-B2IL cassette recorder, production, photography, cover illustrations
- Thighpaulsandra – recorded by
- Holy McGrail – design
