= Congregation Beth Israel (New Orleans) =

Orthodox synagogue in Louisiana, United States

- Hebrew: בית ישראל
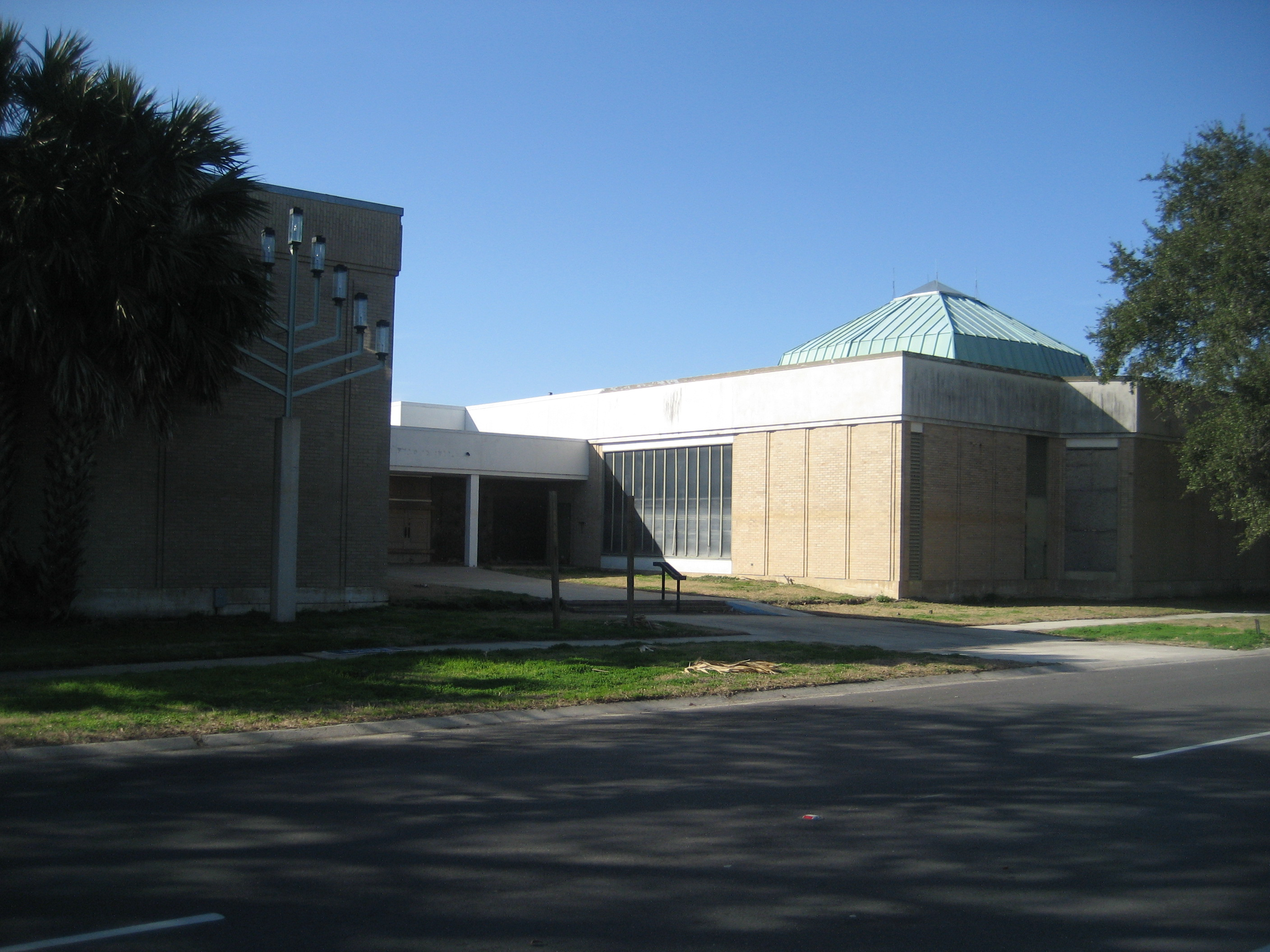
- Beth Israel building on Canal Boulevard in 2010, gutted and vacant. Lines from long standing floodwaters are still visible.

- Location in Louisiana

Religion
- Affiliation: Modern Orthodox Judaism
- Ecclesiastical or organisational status: Synagogue
- Leadership: Rabbi Shlomo Stauber
- Status: Active

Location
- Location: 4004 West Esplanade Avenue, Metairie, Louisiana
- Country: United States
- Coordinates: 30°00′54″N 90°10′43″W

Architecture
- Architect: Emile Weil (1924)
- Established: 1903 (as a congregation)
- Completed: 1924 (Carondelet St); 2012 (Metairie)

Website
- bethisraelnola.com

Congregation Beth Israel (Hebrew: בית ישראל) is a Modern Orthodox synagogue located at 4004 West Esplanade Avenue in Metairie, Louisiana (a suburb of New Orleans) in the United States.

Founded in 1903 or 1904, though tracing its roots back to 1857, it is the oldest Orthodox congregation in the New Orleans region. Originally located on Carondelet Street in New Orleans' Central City, it constructed and moved to a building at 7000 Canal Boulevard in Lakeview, New Orleans, in 1971.

At one time the largest Orthodox congregation in the Southern United States, its membership was over 500 families in the 1960s, but fell to under 200 by 2005. That year, its Canal Boulevard building was severely flooded by the 2005 New Orleans levee failure disaster during Hurricane Katrina. Despite attempts to save them, all seven of its Torah scrolls were destroyed, as were over 3,000 prayer books. The building suffered further flooding damage caused by the theft of copper air-conditioning tubing in 2007.

In the wake of Katrina, another 50 member families left New Orleans, including the rabbis. The congregation began sharing space with Gates of Prayer, a Reform synagogue in Metairie, a suburb of New Orleans. In 2009, the congregation purchased land from Gates of Prayer, and by 2012 had built a new synagogue next to it at 4000 West Esplanade Avenue. As of 2016 the rabbi was Gabriel Greenberg.

== Early history ==
Beth Israel is the oldest Orthodox congregation in the New Orleans region and its most prominent. Though it was founded as early as 1903, it traces its roots back to much older synagogues. In the mid-19th century New Orleans had a number of small Orthodox congregations of Eastern European Jews, generally "structured along nationalistic lines". These included a synagogue of Galitzianer Jews (Chevra Thilim), and two of Lithuanian Jews, (one—Chevra Mikve Israel—following the non-Hassidic liturgy, the other—Anshe Sfard—following the Hassidic liturgy). In 1857, a congregation consisting primarily of Prussian Jews from Posen organized as Tememe Derech, "The Right Way". As they followed the Polish rite, they were known as "The Polish Congregation".

Tememe Derech built a synagogue in the 500 block of Carondelet Street in the Central City section of New Orleans in 1867. It was the sole Orthodox congregation to construct its own building; only a minority of New Orleans' Jews were Orthodox, and other congregations rented space or met in members' homes. Tememe Derech's membership, however, never exceeded 50, and in 1903 or 1904 the synagogue disbanded, and merged with a number of other small Orthodox congregations and a burial society to form Beth Israel. Services were initially held in rented quarters in the same 500 block of Carondelet Street.

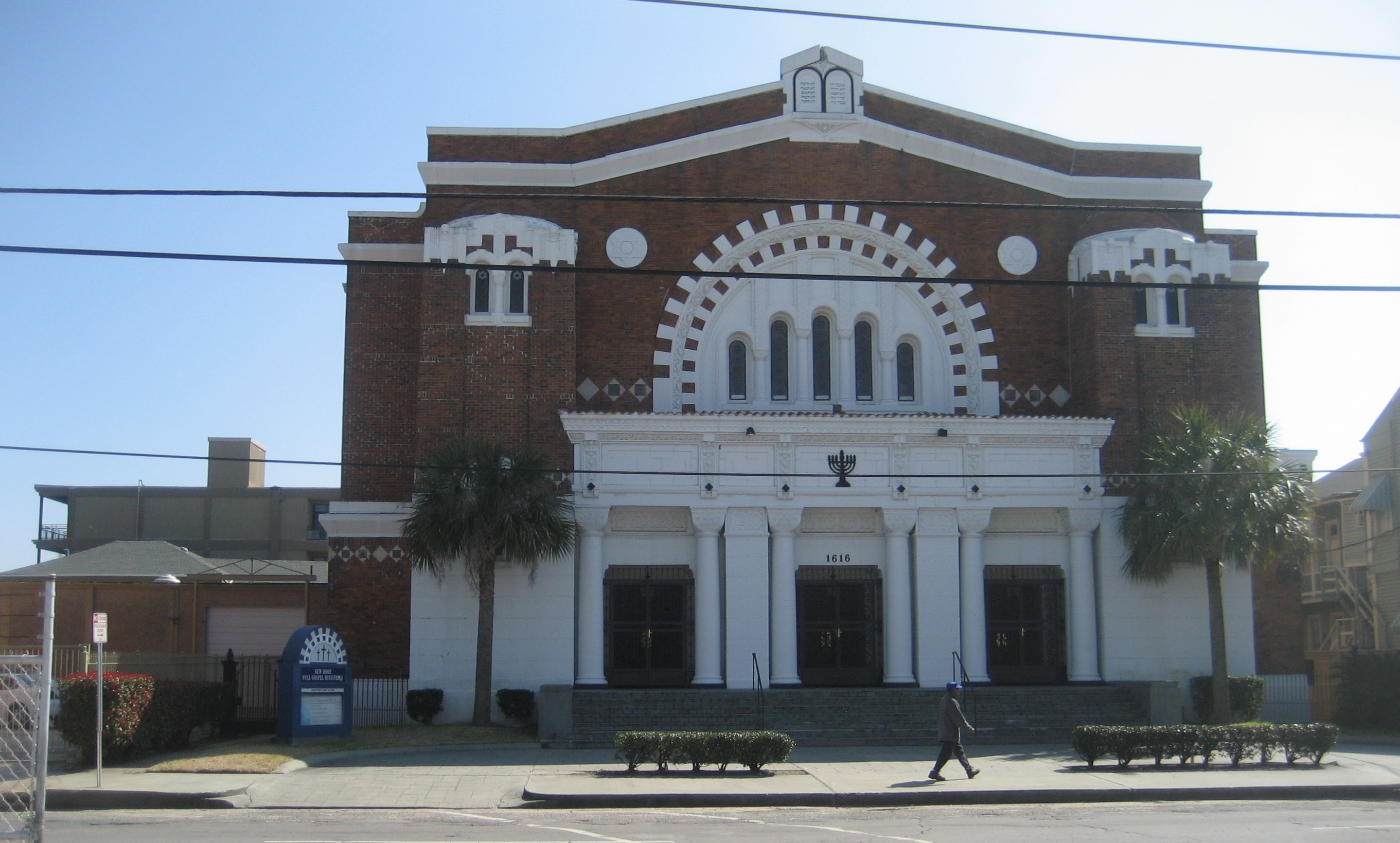
Beth Israel synagogue building on Carondelet St., designed by Emile Weil

In 1905, Beth Israel purchased the home of New Orleans' former mayor Joseph A. Shakspeare at 1610 Carondelet Street. Funds for the new acquisition came from both the Orthodox and Reform communities of New Orleans. After remodeling the building, the congregation began holding services there, in time for the 1906 High Holy Days. Membership grew quickly; by 1910 Beth Israel was the second-largest Jewish congregation in the city, with 180 member families, and by 1914 that number had grown to 250 families. By 1918, however, membership had fallen to 175 families. That year the synagogue's income was $6,000 (today $128,000).

Moses Hyman Goldberg was the congregation's first rabbi, but within a year he moved to Chevra Thilim. Goldberg served as New Orleans' mohel until his death in 1940.

== 1920s to early 2000s ==
Beth Israel rebuilt its synagogue at the Carondelet Street location in 1924. The new building was designed by Emile Weil, a Southern architect renown for his design of religious buildings and theaters. He designed other New Orleans' synagogues, including the Touro Synagogue and the Anshe Sfard, as well as other non-religious buildings throughout Louisiana. Beth Israel's new Byzantine Revival building, with its seating capacity of 1,200, reflected "the growing economic and social confidence of the membership": it had "beautiful" stained-glass windows, a "magnificent" imported European chandelier, and "hand-carved Stars of David in the ceiling". The building was dedicated on September 12, and a Boston rabbi, Henry Raphael Gold, was a guest speaker. He was so impressed that he stayed on, becoming Beth Israel's rabbi.

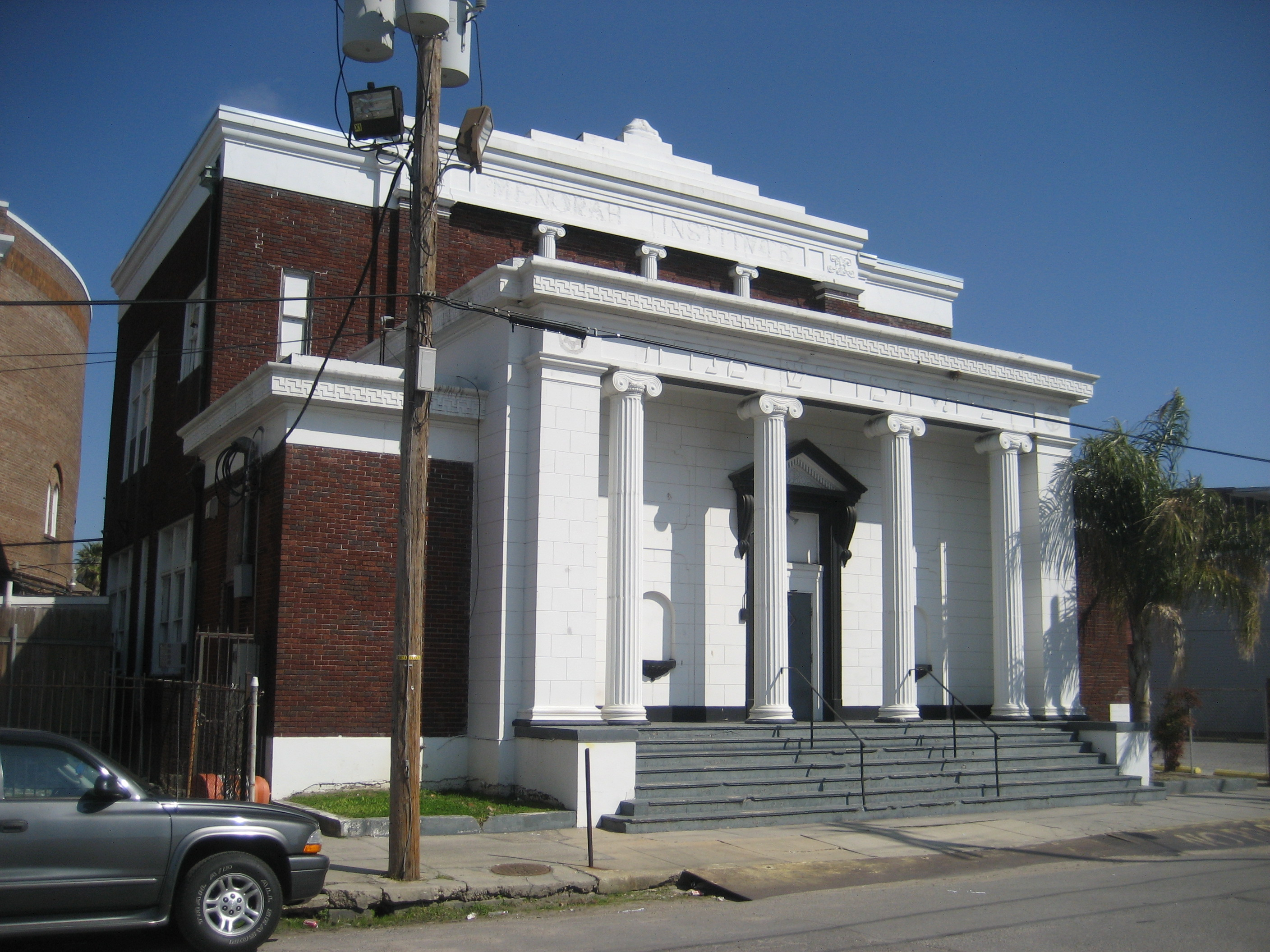
Menorah Institute building on Euterpe St.

In 1926 Beth Israel built the "Menorah Institute" Talmud Torah building on Euterpe Street, adjoining the Carondelet synagogue. The school, which served as an Orthodox alternative to the existing Communal Hebrew School, comprised a nursery school, a Hebrew school, and a Sunday school. The building also housed Beth Israel's offices, and the "Little Shul" ("shul" is the Yiddish word for synagogue), where services were held twice a day.

The congregation leased land for burials in the Chevra Thilim Cemetery on Canal Street, a site that had been used by Tememe Derech as early as 1860, and which was shared with several other congregations. In the 1930s Beth Israel purchased its own cemetery on Frenchmen Street.

Uri Miller joined Beth Israel as rabbi in 1935, a post he would hold through the early 1940s. He was president of the Hebrew Theological College Alumni from 1936 to 1938, and of its successor the Rabbinical Council of America from 1946 to 1948.

During Miller's tenure the synagogue's neighborhood began to deteriorate. Members started moving uptown, and the congregation embarked on a search for a new location. In 1963 Beth Israel purchased a block of land at 7000 Canal Boulevard at Walker Street in the Lakeview neighborhood. It moved into its new larger building there in 1971.

Former Ku Klux Klan leader David Duke's successful 1989 run for a Louisiana House of Representatives seat in nearby Metairie was a cause for concern in the congregation. Then-rabbi Gavriel Newman spoke out against Duke, feeling that people were being "taken in" by "the modern guise of Klan members of Duke's ilk is the two-piece suit, the blow-dried hair and the sweet smile, which seem to serve them very well to hide the inherent racism and the propensity to violence." During the campaign an anti-Duke rally was planned to be held at Beth Israel by Mordechai Levy of the Jewish Defense Organization (JDO). It was, however, cancelled by Beth Israel, after strong objections by members of Beth Israel and the larger Jewish community, in part because it was felt that the JDO's actions would actually create more support for Duke, and in part because of Levy's statements that the JDO would not rule out violence in its efforts against Duke.

From 1914 through World War II Beth Israel described itself the "largest Orthodox congregation in the South", and in the 1960s it had 500 member families. By 2005, however, that number had been reduced to fewer than 200. Nevertheless, Beth Israel still held services twice a day, the only synagogue in New Orleans to do so.

== Hurricane Katrina and aftermath ==
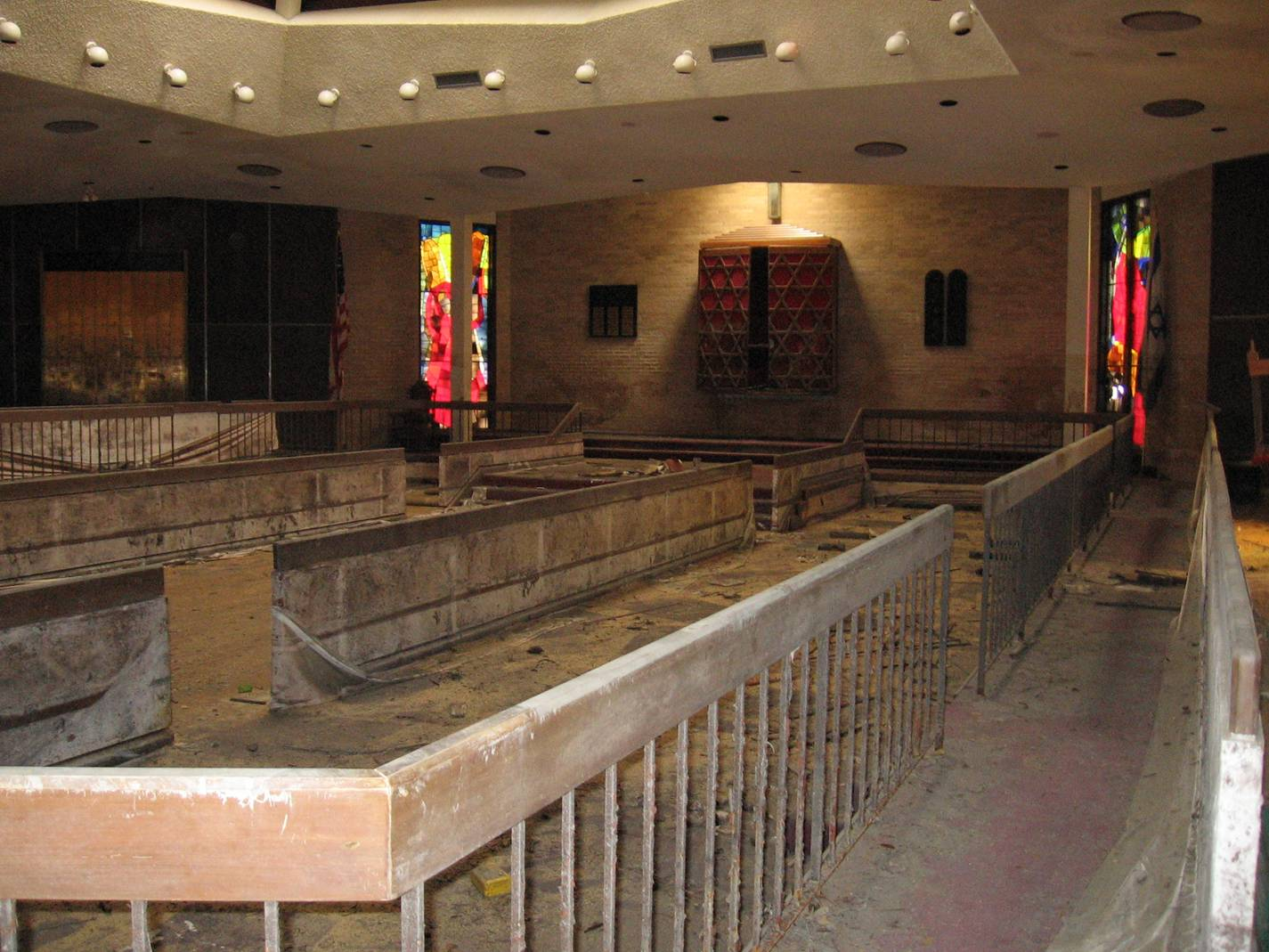
Interior of the Beth Israel Congregation sanctuary after dewatering

As a result of Hurricane Katrina and the subsequent 2005 levee failures in Greater New Orleans, the congregation's building at 7000 Canal Boulevard filled with at least ten feet of water, and Beth Israel garnered national attention after attempts were made to save its Torah scrolls. Beth Israel's rabbi, Yisroel Shiff, who had evacuated to Tennessee before Katrina hit, contacted Rabbi Isaac Leider, who had worked on ZAKA search-and-rescue teams in Israel for five years. After contacting federal officials and the Louisiana National Guard, Leider hired a helicopter to fly him to within a mile of Beth Israel, met with the Federal Emergency Management Agency (FEMA) search-and-rescue team appointed to retrieve the scrolls. The group used rubber rafts to reach Beth Israel and enter it, where Leider waded into the sanctuary and rescued the Torah scrolls and their silver ornaments.

Despite Leider's efforts, all seven Torah scrolls were unsalvageable, and had to be buried. They had initially been buried in her backyard by Rebecca Heggelund, Beth Israel's non-Jewish secretary, who first received them after their rescue, and were subsequently re-buried next to the grave of Beth Israel's gabbai Meyer Lachoff. Lachoff had died just after Katrina, but could not be buried in New Orleans until months later.

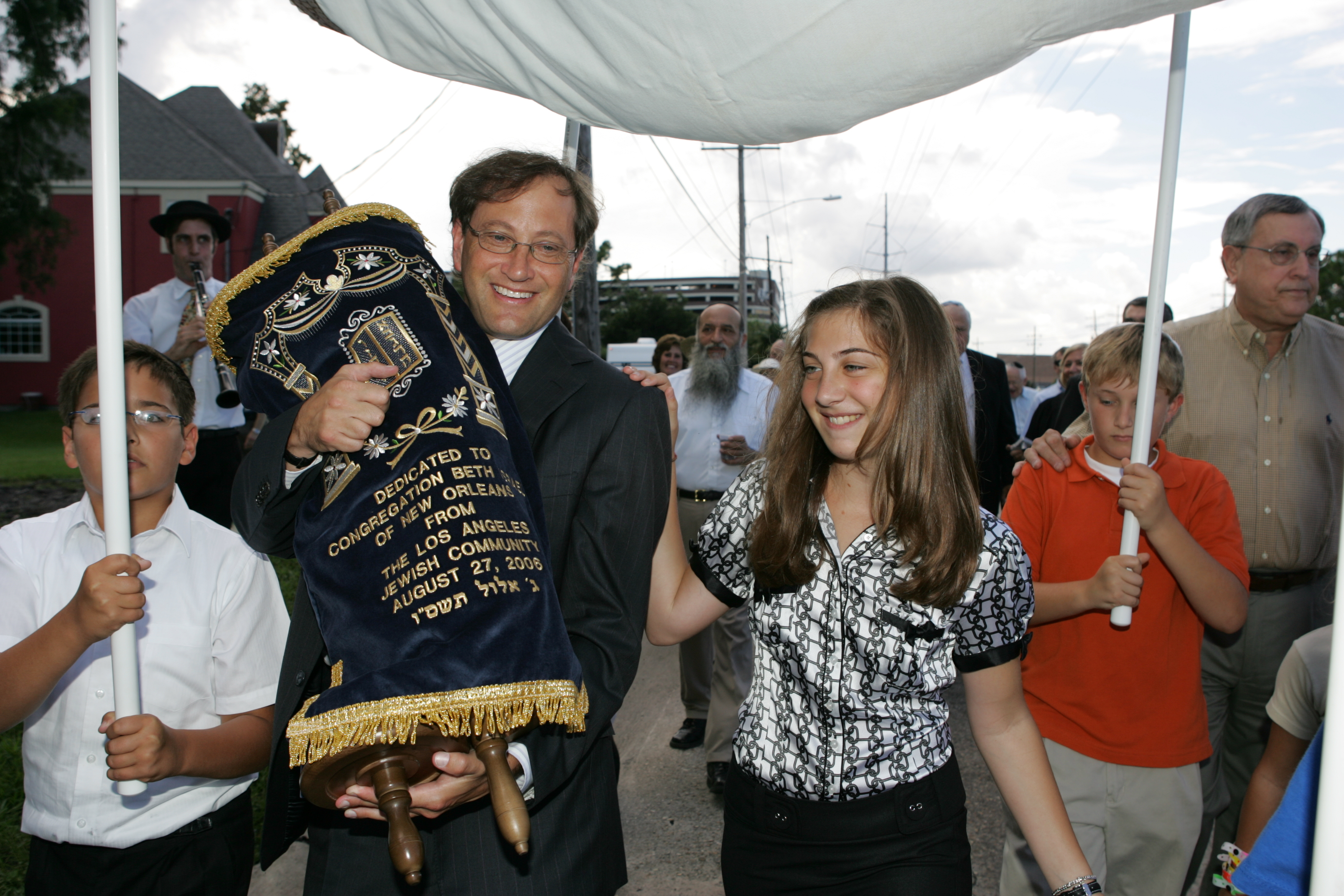
Hayley Fields leading new Torah dedication ceremony at Beth Israel Congregation on August 27, 2006

In addition to losing all of its Torah scrolls, Beth Israel lost all its furniture, and over 3,000 siddurs and mahzors, and almost all of its members' homes were flooded, forcing them to move. The congregation did, however, receive assistance in replacing some of its assets; the Orthodox Union immediately sent Beth Israel 50 ArtScroll siddurs, and Brith Shalom Beth Israel Congregation of Charleston, South Carolina, and Congregation Shaare Zedek Sons of Abraham of Providence, Rhode Island each donated Torahs. Hayley Fields, a 14-year-old from Los Angeles, heard of Beth Israel's difficult circumstances, and with the support of her mother, spearheaded a fund-raising drive, selling 3,500 watches. $18,000 was ultimately raised to buy a Torah, which was dedicated in August, 2006, two days before the first anniversary of the hurricane. At that ceremony the National Council of Young Israel also donated 150 new Artscoll mahzors, in time for the High Holy Days.

In the wake of Katrina 50 families that were members of Beth Israel left New Orleans, and gave up membership in the congregation. These included Rabbi Shiff and his family. After the flood Beth Israel's board of directors informed Shiff, who had joined they synagogue in April 2002, that it would not be able to meet its contractual obligations and pay him past December. Shiff and his family had also lost their home and much of their possessions, and had been living in Memphis. Shiff resigned effective November 1, 2005, citing this loss, and the lack of a functioning Jewish Day School in the area for his children.

Soon after the flood, Beth Israel received an offer to temporarily use space from Congregation Gates of Prayer, a Reform synagogue in Metairie, a suburb of New Orleans. The congregation began holding weekly services and renting office space there.

In 2006 it was unclear if Beth Israel, which had already been in difficult financial shape, would be allowed, or have the means, to re-build its synagogue. The building suffered further flood damage in July 2007 when thieves stole the copper tubing for the main air-conditioning system. They broke the water main, and water from the second floor flooded the building for three days, to a depth of three to four feet, before it was discovered. The property was put up for sale.

== Recent events ==
In 2007, the congregation began some joint programming with Anshe Sefard, New Orleans' only other remaining Orthodox synagogue, and in the summer hired Uri Topolosky as its new rabbi. A graduate of Yeshivat Chovevei Torah, Topolosky had previously served as the associate rabbi of the Hebrew Institute of Riverdale, and had been one of 21 rabbis arrested at the United Nations during an April 2007 sit-in demanding that Iran be expelled from the U.N.

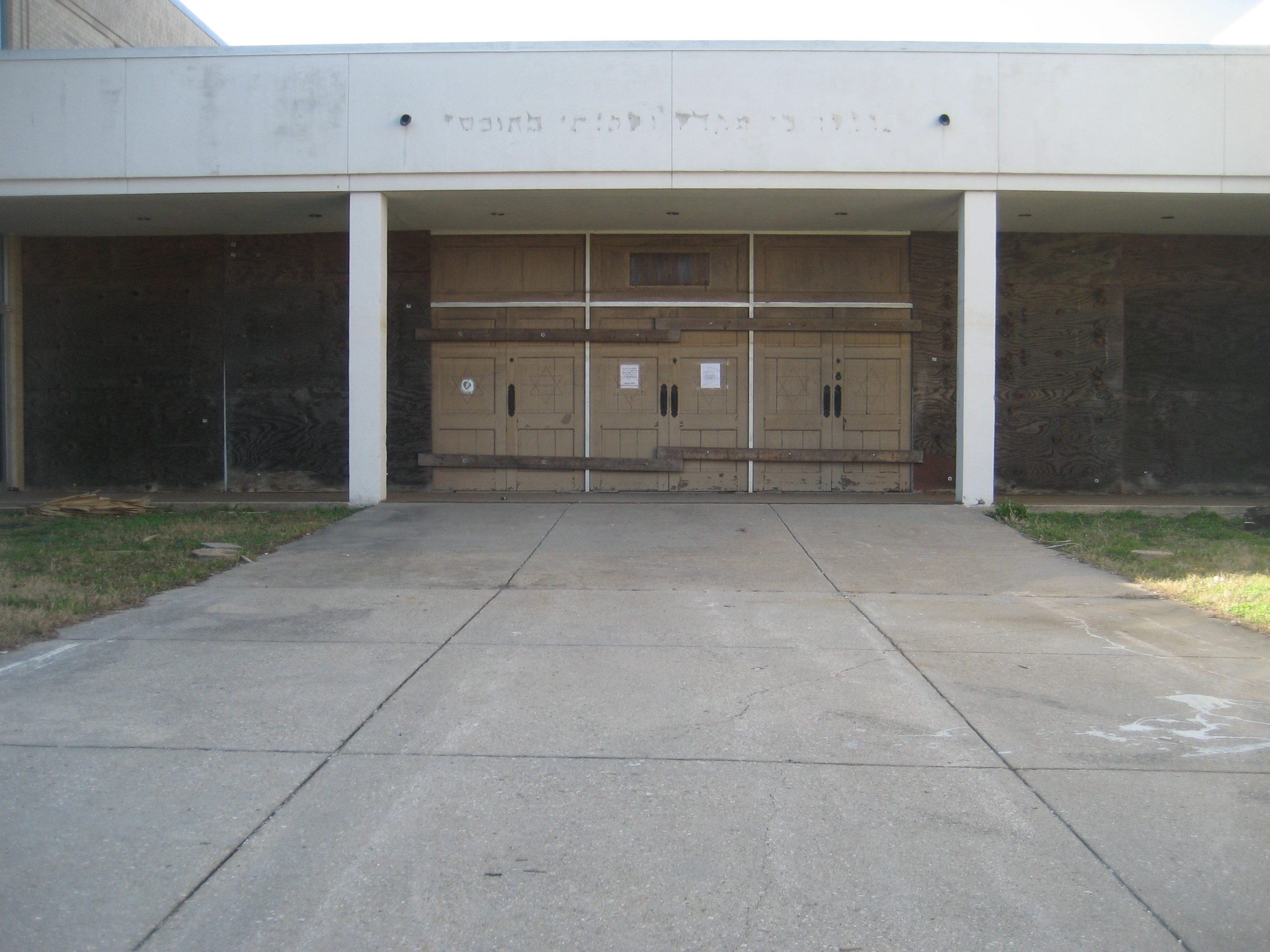
The sealed front doors of the Canal Boulevard building in 2010

To help attract new members, in the summer Topolosky started a recruitment campaign, placing an advertisement in the New York newspaper The Jewish Week, and re-designing Beth Israel's website. The campaign's tagline was "If you believe in the ability to destroy, you can believe in the ability to rebuild," a saying of Rebbe Nachman of Breslov, and by the end of October ten new members had joined. However, while all New Orleans synagogues lost membership after Katrina, as of 2007, Beth Israel was the only New Orleans synagogue that had not re-opened in its former location.

Beth Israel started "The Minyan Project" in 2008, an effort to attract 10 (see minyan) new Orthodox families to New Orleans. The families were given "generous financial assistance", and in return had to "commit to providing community service, from maintaining the eruv enclosure that's due to be completed within the month to assisting in kosher supervision at a local supermarket." According to Topolosky, with the move of four new families to the area, New Orleans likely had proportionately the fastest growing Modern Orthodox community in the United States. In April of that year the Orthodox Union gave the congregation $235,000 towards a new building. At the time, Beth Israel had 80 member families, and 80 "associate member" families (families who belonged to other synagogues as well).

By 2009, the congregation had decided to erect a new synagogue on land it had purchased from Gates of Prayer, part of the lot on which the Gates of Prayer synagogue stood. For the 2009 High Holy Days, Topolosky planned to launch a capital campaign to raise $1 million towards the construction of the building. The new building at 4004 West Esplanade Avenue was completed and occupied in August 2012. The old building, which still stood vacant, had been purchased by a surgeon for use as medical offices. All that was saved from it and brought to the new building were a bimah (originally from the building on Carondelet Street), a ner tamid, two menorahs, a hanukiah, and "a stained-glass window and a wooden plaque honoring pioneer donor families from Carondelet Street". The hanukiah had previously been featured and lit at the 2010 White House Hanukkah Party.

Topolosky and his family left Beth Israel the following year, citing "the deteriorating Jewish educational landscape in New Orleans". New Orleans' premier Jewish school, which had been established in 1996, closed for a year after Hurricane Katrina, and struggled to regain its peak enrollment of over 80 students. Although by then New Orleans' Jewish population exceeded its pre-Katrina size, demographic changes negatively affected the school's population. The same demographic changes affected Beth Israel; its Saturday morning service only attracted around 40 worshipers, its Friday night service only 25, and it had no daily minyan. In 2012 the school's board opened its doors to more non-Jewish students and changed the name from New Orleans Jewish Day School to Community Day School, but enrollment continued to fall to 29 students, half non-Jewish, by 2013.

In 2013 Beth Israel hired Gabriel Greenberg to succeed Topolosky as rabbi, though he could not join the synagogue until the following year. A native of New England, he, like Topolosky, received his rabbinic ordination at Yeshivat Chovevei Torah. As of 2016, Greenberg was Beth Israel's rabbi.

Soon, changes overtook New Orleans. The Day School rediscovered its identity, for example. With a recommitment to its Jewish mission, the renamed-once-more Jewish Community Day School saw renewed interest from Jewish families under the leadership of Head of School Sharon Pollin. When Dr. Pollin left in 2019, enrollment had reached 66 students, and with the expansion of JCDS's Green Preschool, the school reached an enrollment of 76 students in the spring of 2020 under new head and New Orleans native Dr. Brad Philipson. The school is now approximately 80% Jewish and is expected exceeded its pre-Katrina enrollment by the fall of 2020. As of the fall of 2022, enrollment stands at a record 106 students and is expected to continue to climb. Much of this success is owed to the active involvement of the Beth Israel rabbis.

A loyal friend to the Day School and beloved at Beth Israel, Rabbi Gabe left New Orleans in 2019. He was replaced by the newly ordained Rabbi Josh Pernick. A thoughtful scholar with an ability to connect to young and old, Rabbi Josh was immediately successful at Beth Israel, and he did so with the support of the jack-of-all-trades synagogue administrator, Rabbi David Posternock. Both Rabbis were active in the Day School and played a pivotal role in the vibrant Jewish life along the West Esplanade Avenue corridor in Metairie. In 2022, Rabbi Pernick left to return to the Northeast, and Rabbi Posternock shifted his professional duties to Jewish Family Services while remaining an active member and volunteer at Beth Israel. That summer, Beth Israel welcomed Rabbi Phil Kaplan, another YCT graduate, to its helm. Rabbi Kaplan joined Beth Israel from a congregational post in Australia. The current Rabbi is now Rabbi Shlomo Stauber who joined the congregation in 2025.
