= Psychedelic Revolution =

Studio album by Julian Cope
- Released: 14 May 2012
- Genre: Rock
- Length: 61:04
- Label: Head Heritage
- Producer: Julian Cope

Julian Cope chronology
The Jehovahcoat Demos (2011)	Psychedelic Revolution (2012)	Woden (2012)

Professional ratings
Review scores
Source	Rating
The Vinyl District	A−
The Great Rock Discography	9/10

Psychedelic Revolution is a double album by Julian Cope, released in 2012 on Head Heritage. It is Cope's twenty-seventh solo album and features 11 tracks spread across two half-hour CDs. The album is dedicated to Che Guevara and Leila Khaled.

== Reception ==
In The Sunday Times, Stewart Lee said, "Though the first of its two discs is sluggish in parts, Psychedelic Revolution sports an unequivocal banker bashing ethos, and sounds like an anarchist commune of Odinist krautrockers fronted by a slightly shot Scott Walker. And Cope can still mainline the sublime."

== Track listing ==
All tracks are written by Julian Cope.

Disc one – Side of Che Guevara
No.	Title	Length
1.	"Raving on the Moor"	5:45
2.	"Vive le Suicide"	4:37
3.	"Cromwell in Ireland"	3:11
4.	"Revolutionary Man"	4:51
5.	"As the Beer Flows Over Me"	3:29
6.	"Hooded & Benign"	9:02
Total length:		30:55

Disc two – Side of Leila Khaled
No.	Title	Length
1.	"Psychedelic Revolution"	5:01
2.	"X-Mass in the Woman's Shelter"	6:17
3.	"Roswell"	7:47
4.	"Because He Was Wooden"	5:29
5.	"The Death of Rock'n'Roll"	5:36
Total length:		30:09 (61:04)

Poetry (printed in booklet)
No.	Title	Length
1.	"Anti Kapitalist Chant"
2.	"I Am Loki Under the Moon"

== Personnel ==
- Julian Cope — vocals, electric guitar, acoustic guitar, Spanish guitar, Mellotron, Selmer Omnichord, 26" and 30" marching bass drums, electric piano, Musser glockenspiel, cello on "Hooded & Benign", producer, directed by, photography, artwork
- Christopher Patrick "Holy" McGrail – synthesizer, recording technology, mastering engineer, album design
- Adam "Randy Apostle" Whittaker – vocals, recording technology
- Ady "Acoustika" Fletcher – vocals
- Chris "Christophe F." Farrell – vocals
- Andrew "Common Era" Johnstone – vocals
- Big Nige – 30" marching bass drum
- Lucy Brownhills – lead vocals on "Psychedelic Revolution"
- Antony "Antronhy de La O " Hodgkinson – synthesizer on "Psychedelic Revolution"
