= Jewish Defense Organization =

Militant Jewish group in the United States

- Abbreviation: JDO
- Formation: early 1980s
- Founder: Mordechai Levy
- Type: Militant group
- Legal status: Unclear (may no longer be active)
- Headquarters: United States
- Region served: United States
- Parent organization: Jewish Defense League (offshoot)

The Jewish Defense Organization (JDO) was or is a Jewish militant group in the United States. It is unclear if it is still functioning.

== Background and ideology ==
The JDO was founded in the early 1980s by Mordechai Levy after a violent feud with the Jewish Defense League's former leader Irv Rubin, who was either killed or committed suicide in jail in 2002. It is one of two United States-based offshoots of the Jewish Defense League (JDL) which were formed after their founders broke their relations with their former leader Meir Kahane.

According to the Anti-Defamation League, the JDO is a branch of Kahanism. The JDO opposes the ADL and believes that ADL head Abe Foxman obtained a pardon for Marc Rich after Rich made a contribution to the ADL. The Anti-Defamation League states that:

The Kahanist movement – comprising the Jewish Defense League (JDL) and the Jewish Defense Organization (JDO) in the United States, the Kach (Hebrew for "thus" or "this is the way") Party in Israel, and the Kahane Chai ("Kahane Lives") group, founded after Kahane's murder and operating both in Israel and in the U.S. – has spanned 26 years, reflecting a consistent agenda of hate, fear-mongering and intimidation.

Rand Corporation terrorism authority Bruce Hoffman notes that "terrorist organizations almost without exception now regularly select names for themselves that consciously eschew the word 'terrorism' in any of its forms." He cites the JDO as an example of an organisation that has chosen such a name.

== JDO's campaigns ==
The JDO's security team has occasionally patrolled Jewish neighborhoods in the aftermath of antisemitic incidents, and urged other Jewish groups to do likewise. JDO members attempted to help provide security in Crown Heights during the 1991 Crown Heights Riot. The group has engaged in fights against neo-Nazis and white power skinheads in Las Vegas and other cities. It has also demonstrated, without incident, against Louis Farrakhan in New York City. The JDO often gives its demonstrations pseudo-military names, such as "Operation Klan Kicker" or "Operation Nazi Kicker".

In 2004, the JDO held rallies at an apartment house on Manhattan's Upper West Side, where a neo-Nazi activist and Holocaust denier ran his operation. In 1989, it launched a boycott of the rap group Public Enemy in response to allegedly antisemitic remarks by Professor Griff, its self-styled Minister of Information. As a result of the media controversy, Griff temporarily left the band, and Public Enemy apologized for his remarks.

The JDO has adopted a tactic of pressuring hotels and other public facilities to cancel meetings sponsored by antisemites such as David Duke. In early 2004, the JDO waged a phone-in campaign to pressure a Florida company to remove billboard messages sponsored by the National Alliance, an organization widely regarded as neo-Nazi. In September 2006 Columbia University scrapped plans for an address by Iranian President Mahmoud Ahmadinejad because of security and logistical problems. The move came as the JDO expressed outrage that the hard-line leader had been invited to speak.

In late 2006, the JDO initiated Operation Screwball, aimed at the small Haredi Jewish group Neturei Karta. In 2007, the JDO helped organize a demonstration in which several hundred Orthodox Jews protested against Neturei Karta, some of whose members had been attending a Holocaust denial conference in Iran. The protesters shouted "Nazi traitors! Go back to Iran! You are killing Jews!" at members of Neturei Karta in the Rockland County community of Monsey. On January 14, 2007, 200 JDO members and sympathizers gathered outside a Brooklyn hotel to protest the presence of Moshe Aryeh Friedman, an anti-Israel rabbi who spoke at a Holocaust-denial conference in Iran.

In June 2007, New York City Police investigated the JDO after it plastered fliers over Brooklyn Councilman Charles Barron's office, calling him an antisemite for voting for a defeated proposal to name a street after controversial black nationalist activist Sonny Carson.

=== Allegations that the JDO fueled racial unrest ===
Levy and the JDO's activities led to accusations that the group inflamed divisions at Rutgers University in 1995, where African American students had protested against comments which were made by its then-President Francis L. Lawrence because they perceived that his comments were anti-Black. The JDO accused the protesting black students of being racist and antisemitic. Levy's involvement was met with apprehension by some members of Rutgers University's Jewish community. Rabbi Norman Weitzner of Rutgers Hillel expressed his belief that the protesting black students were not antisemitic when he stated "The JDO sees antisemitism at the drop of a hat, when it may not actually exist." At that time, the interim director of Rutgers Hillel stated that Levy "thinks he's going to wake up the Jewish students. What's going to happen is that he's going to start a racial war."

== See also ==
- Meir Kahane
- Golus nationalism
- Jewish terrorism
- Kahanism
