= Have a Marijuana =

Live album by David Peel & The Lower East Side
- Released: March 1968
- Recorded: 1968, New York City
- Genre: Contemporary folk
- Length: 30:31
- Label: Elektra

David Peel chronology
Have a Marijuana (1968)	The American Revolution (1970)

Professional ratings
Review scores
Source	Rating
Allmusic	2.5/5 stars

Have a Marijuana is the debut album of David Peel & The Lower East Side, released by Elektra Records in 1968.

== Track listing ==
All songs written by David Peel, except "I Like Marijuana", co-written with Cliff Goldsmith, Fred Smith, Marty Cooper, and H. B. Barnum.

Side one
No.	Title	Length
1.	"Mother Where Is My Father?"	3:07
2.	"I Like Marijuana"	5:18
3.	"Here Comes a Cop"	2:35
4.	"I've Got Some Grass"	0:37
5.	"Happy Mother's Day"	2:06
6.	"Up Against the Wall"	1:43

Side two
No.	Title	Length
1.	"I Do My Bawling in the Bathroom"	5:57
2.	"The Alphabet Song"	2:03
3.	"Show Me the Way to Get Stoned"	2:45
4.	"We Love You"	3:16

== Personnel ==
- Larry Adam – 12-string guitar
- Harold C. Black – tambourine
- George Cori – washtub bass
- David Peel – vocals, guitar, harmonica
- Billy Joe White – 12-string guitar
- Dean White – stadium horn

== Chart positions ==
Charts (1969)	Peak position
US Billboard Top LPs	186
