= John Sinclair Freedom Rally =

1971 protest and concert in Michigan, US

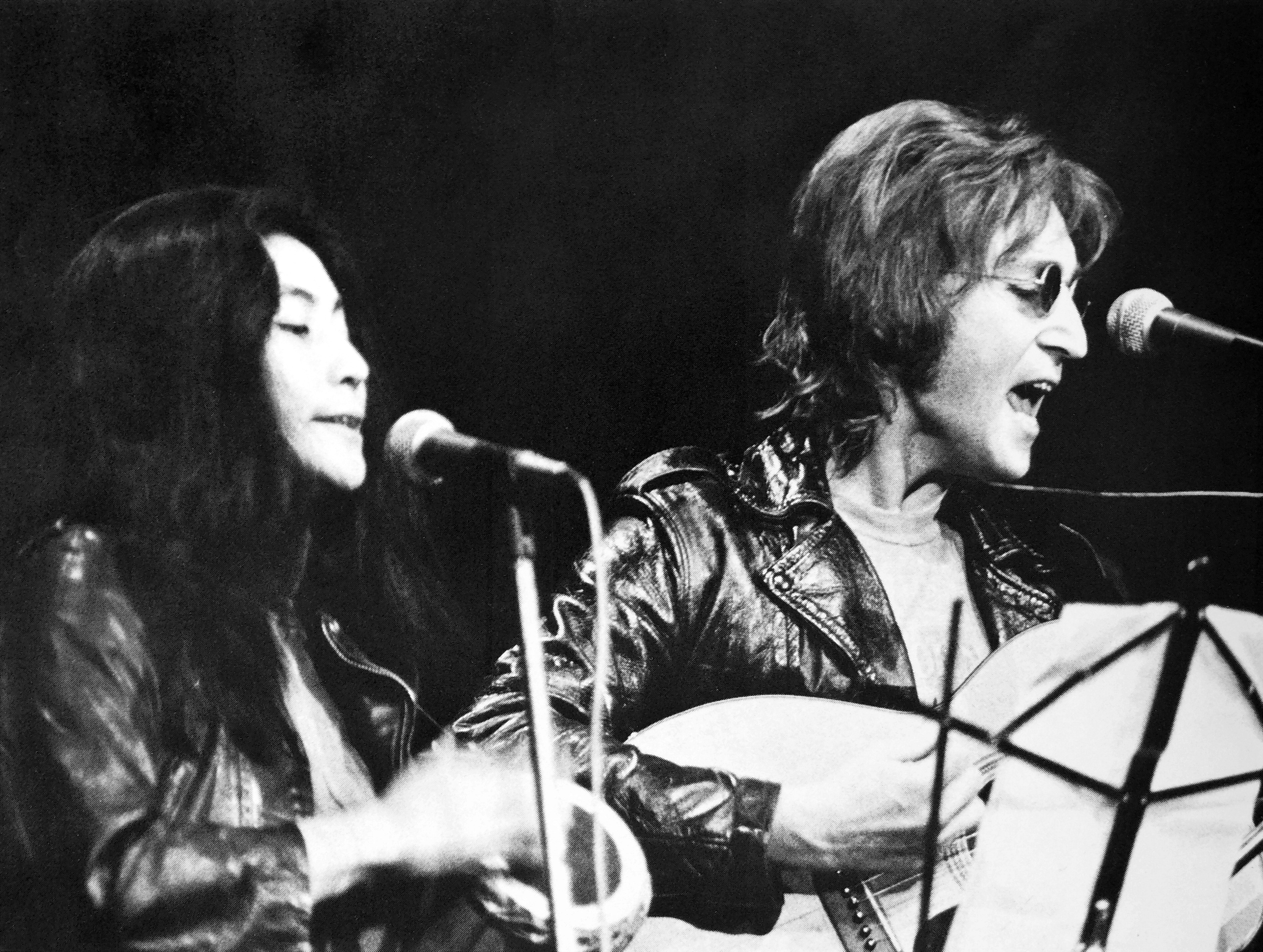
- Yoko Ono and John Lennon at the Freedom Rally
- Date: December 10, 1971
- Venue: Crisler Arena, University of Michigan
- Location: Ann Arbor, Michigan
- Theme: Counterculture of the 1960s, Decriminalization of marijuana
- Cause: Release of John Sinclair

The John Sinclair Freedom Rally was a protest and concert in response to the imprisonment of John Sinclair for possession of marijuana held on December 10, 1971, in the Crisler Arena at the University of Michigan in Ann Arbor, Michigan. The event was filmed and released as Ten For Two.

The reason behind the concert was the sentencing of Sinclair, who was given ten years in prison for the possession of two marijuana cigarettes. Shortly after the event, Sinclair was released.

== Musical performers ==
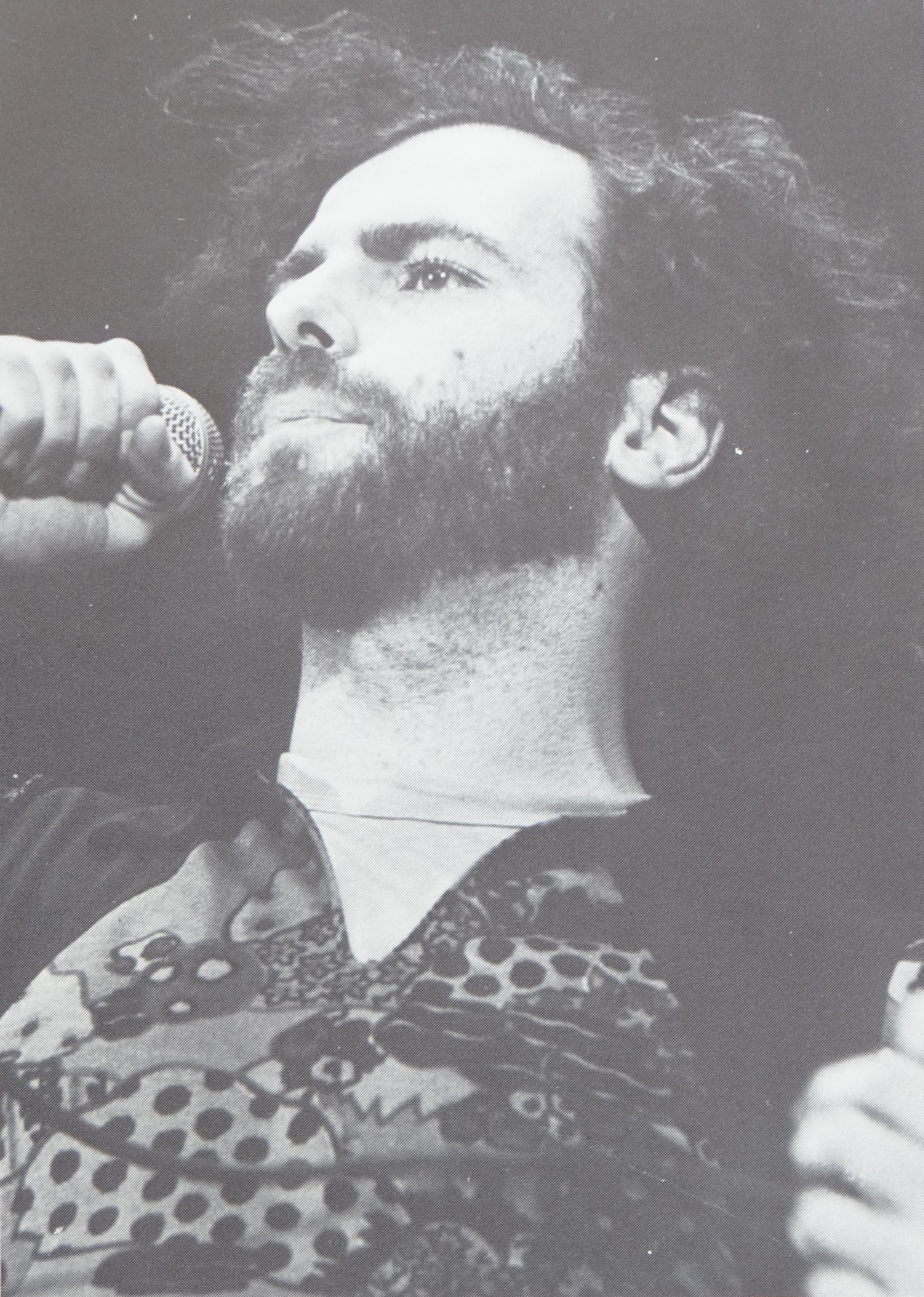
Jerry Rubin at the Freedom Rally

- John Lennon
- Yoko Ono
- Phil Ochs
- The Up
- Commander Cody and His Lost Planet Airmen
- Bob Seger
- Stevie Wonder
- Archie Shepp
- Joy of Cooking
- David Peel
- Teegarden & Van Winkle

== Speakers ==
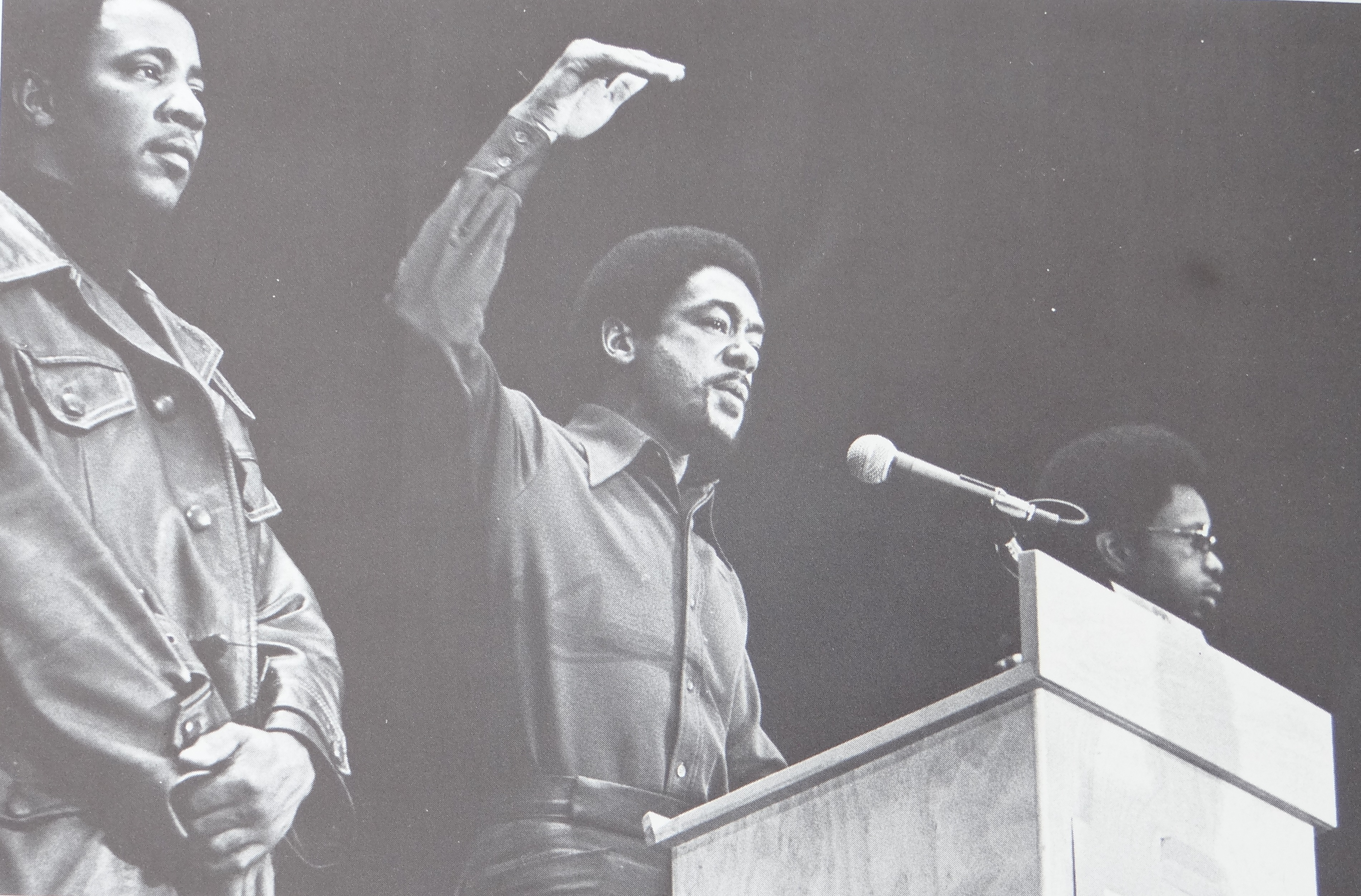
Bobby Seale at the Freedom Rally

- Bobby Seale
- Jerry Rubin
- Allen Ginsberg
- Rennie Davis
- James Groppi
- Sheila Murphy
- Johnnie Tillmon
- Ed Sanders
- Jane Fonda

== See also ==
- Cannabis laws in Ann Arbor, Michigan
