= Moshe Friedman =

Haredi Jewish activist

Moshe Aryeh Friedman
- Born: 1972 (age 53–54); Williamsburg, Brooklyn, New York City, United States
- Occupation: Haredi activist
- Known for: Anti-Zionist activism, claiming to be a rabbi, legal activism concerning circumcision practices
- Movement: Anti-Zionism

Moshe Aryeh Friedman (born 1972 in Williamsburg, Brooklyn, New York City) is a Haredi Jewish activist based in Antwerp, Belgium. He is known for his anti-Zionist views, purporting to be a Rabbi and for controversies involving Jewish communal authorities in Europe.

== Rabbinical status ==
Friedman has publicly referred to himself as "Rabbi Moshe Friedman". His use of the title has been disputed by Jewish communal authorities, including the Chief Rabbi of Israel, Yona Metzger. The Central Israelite Consistory of Belgium stated in 2014 that he is not authorised to use the title "rabbi" in Belgium.

Friedman has rejected these claims. In a 2026 interview with Humo, he stated that he had been recognised as a rabbi in Austria and had stepped down from a synagogue leadership role while retaining the title.

In August 2026, Friedman’s Rabbinical status was debunked by former Vienna Chief Rabbi Chaim Eisenberg, and Rabbi Chaim Joseph Horowitz. Both categorically denied conferring any form of Rabbinical status to Friedman.

This was followed by a statement from the United States Ambassador to Belgium, Bill White, who said “Two authoritative declarations have now set the record straight once and for all: Moshe Aryeh Friedman is not a recognized rabbi and represents no Jewish community."

== Views and controversies ==
Friedman is an outspoken opponent of Zionism. His views have been described as broadly similar to those of the Satmar Hasidic movement, although he is not affiliated with it.

In 2006, he participated in the International Conference to Review the Global Vision of the Holocaust in Iran. At the conference, he stated that he did not deny the Holocaust, but questioned commonly accepted figures. He said that the number of six million Jewish dead had come from a prophecy by Theodore Herzl before the Second World War and that the actual number was closer to one million. His participation drew international criticism.

Due to attending the conference, his wife divorced him.

He was also excommunicated by Jewish communities in Antwerp and Vienna, and his children were denied entry to any communal Jewish institutions.

In 2026, Friedman claimed a ring given to US President Donald Trump from the Antwerp diamond industry on the occasion of the 250th anniversary of the United States was a bribe so the American government would exert political pressure on Belgium in the ongoing investigation into ritual circumcisions. In response to this Ambassador White called these false accusations and said that ‘’literally everything this con artist spouts is fake news.”

== Disputes with Jewish communities ==
Following his participation in the 2006 conference, Friedman was ostracised by the Jewish community in Austria in 2007.

After moving to Antwerp in 2011, Friedman became involved in a legal dispute over schooling. In 2012, a Belgian court ordered a Jewish girls' school to admit his sons due to a lack of alternatives, but the decision was overturned on appeal in 2013.

As a result of this incident, Friedman’s mother Malka Friedman, who lives in America, requested that the children be removed from his custody.

In August 2026, the Jewish Information and Documentation Center (JID), the Forum of Jewish Organizations (FJO), the CCOJB, the European Jewish Association (EJA), and the Rabbinical Centre of Europe (RCE) issued a joint statement that Friedman does not represent any recognized institution and has no mandate to speak on behalf of the Jewish community. They also asked journalists, politicians and public institutions to stop presenting Friedman as some sort of representative of the Jewish community.

== Legal activism ==
In 2023 and 2024, Friedman filed complaints in Antwerp and Brussels concerning circumcision practices performed outside recognised medical frameworks.

According to reporting by VRT NWS, his complaint contributed to a judicial investigation into controversial circumcision practices in Antwerp.

He has been particularly critical of metzitzah b’peh, a traditional circumcision practice involving oral suction.

In May 2026, it was reported that Friedman had filed additional complaints in Vienna and Zurich concerning circumcision practices, stating that procedures performed in those cities posed risks to newborns due to inadequate hygiene and medical oversight. The Zurich Public Prosecutor's Office confirmed that his complaint was under investigation.

Around the same time, the Antwerp Public Prosecutor's office announced its intention to criminally prosecute two Jewish circumcisers on charges of assault and battery and the unauthorised practice of medicine. The prosecutions prompted criticism from the United States Ambassador to Belgium, Bill White, who argued that such criminal charges constituted a restriction on religious freedom. The Belgian government rejected this position, accusing the ambassador of interference in domestic and judicial affairs.

The Antwerp Public Prosecutor's Office subsequently confirmed that the two men would be charged with intentional bodily harm with premeditation against minors, with a hearing before the pre-trial chamber scheduled for 18 June 2026. Israeli Foreign Minister Gideon Sa'ar condemned the indictments, and representatives of Antwerp's Jewish community distanced themselves from Friedman, stating that he was not affiliated with any recognised Jewish institution and that his positions were widely rejected within the community.
