= David Peel (musician) =

American musician (1942–2017)

- Peel in 2005

Background information
- Born: David Michael Rosario; August 3, 1942; Brooklyn, New York, U.S.
- Died: April 6, 2017 (aged 74) Manhattan, New York, U.S.
- Genres: Contemporary folk; proto-punk; folk rock; garage rock
- Occupation: Musician
- Instrument: Guitar
- Years active: 1967–2017
- Labels: Elektra Records; Apple Records; Orange Records

David Peel (born David Michael Rosario; August 3, 1942 – April 6, 2017) was a New York City–based musician who first recorded in the late 1960s with Harold Black, Billy Joe White, George Cori and Larry Adam performing as David Peel and The Lower East Side Band. His raw, acoustic "street rock" with lyrics about marijuana and "bad cops" appealed mostly to hippies and the culturally disenfranchised.

== Biography ==
Peel was born in Manhattan to Puerto Rican parents, Angel Perez, who worked in a restaurant, and Esther Rosario, a homemaker. He was raised in Brooklyn and served two years in the United States Army, and was stationed in Alaska.

Peel took his stage name from a 1967 hoax that claimed that banana peels were psychoactive.

In 1968, Peel was contracted by Elektra Records when he was first discovered and recorded two "envelope pushers" for the label. His album Have a Marijuana peaked at No. 186 on the Billboard chart.

Peel was rediscovered by John Lennon in 1971 as the early seventies continued its swing towards the youth revolution. Lennon befriended Peel when David was playing with his ragtag hippie band in New York's Washington Square Park in Greenwich Village. Lennon produced The Pope Smokes Dope for Peel. This album was banned in many countries and since has been sought after by collectors worldwide.

Peel appeared with John Lennon at the John Sinclair Freedom Rally in Ann Arbor, Michigan on December 10, 1971, later released as a documentary film called "Ten for Two". On January 13, 1972, Peel and his band performed live on the David Frost Show with Lennon, Yoko Ono and Jerry Rubin. This was Lennon's first live appearance on U.S. TV as a solo performer.

In 1976 the independent labels Orange Records and Auravox Records released An Evening With David Peel. The LP was hailed as being a breakthrough recording by capturing the tumultuous mid-1970s American underground movement as well as the bubbling under of live recordings that have become a mainstay of the recording arts. The mix was finalized by Ron St. Germain (of Band 311 fame) at Ultrasonic recording studios in Hempstead, New York.

Peel has been associated with the "transgressive, shock" performer GG Allin, with Allin's debut album and early singles released by Peel's Orange record label. Allin would cover Peel's "Devil's Prayer", "I Want to Kill You", and "I Like Marijuana", and frequently cited him as a musical influence in interviews. Peel also produced the album Always Was, Is and Always Shall Be, and in the unreleased song "What a drag it is to be dead" performed with GG Allin on the drums.

In the early-to-mid 1990s, Peel was a mainstay on The Howard Stern Show, singing at his yearly live birthday shows, and he wrote "the official" song when Stern attempted to run for governor, the song titled (and the chorus stating) "Howard Stern for Governor," repeated three times and finishing with, "For Governor of New York." After Stern dropped out because of financial disclosure laws, Peel changed the "Stern" to "Pataki" for George Pataki since Stern was supporting him.

In 1995, the vinyl LP tracks from An Evening With David Peel were combined with two new multi-tracked studio recordings: "Junk Rock" and "I Hate You" (recorded at Right Track Studios, NYC) for a CD release Up Against The Wall. In the additional studio recordings on the CD, Muruga Booker played his "electric talking drum" on the comeback hit "Junk Rock".

In 1995, Technohead produced "I Wanna Be a Hippy", a gabber remix of "I Like Marijuana", which quickly climbed the charts in many countries.

In 2011, Peel signed with Global Recording Artists. The David Peel Anthology, a career retrospective compiled by Peel with his favorite tracks from his entire career, was released in 2012. In 2011 through 2013, Peel was involved in the Occupy Wall Street protests at Zuccotti Park, in Union Square, and in other New-York-area locations. In addition to performing, Peel documented the protests via hundreds of photographs, some of which he released online. In 2013, David Peel and the Protesters released Up Against the Wall Street, an album of themed protest songs. In 2015, Peel was back to his fight for the legalization of marijuana, releasing his latest album as David Peel and the Lower East Side titled Give Hemp a Chance.

He also made film music for the avant-garde director Rosa von Praunheim.

On March 31, 2017 Peel was escorted to the Veterans Administration hospital in Manhattan New York by fellow musician Joff Wilson, after complaining that he was not feeling well. He suffered a series of three heart attacks upon his arrival. Peel died at the hospital on April 6, 2017. was buried with full military honors at Calverton National Cemetery in Wading River, New York (Section 53-Grave 3208) on April 17, 2017.

== Discography ==
Peel's Have a Marijuana album sleeve on display at the Hash, Marihuana & Hemp Museum in Amsterdam, the Netherlands

- Have a Marijuana (1968)
- The American Revolution (1970)
- The Pope Smokes Dope (1972)
- Santa Claus Rooftop Junkie (1974)
- An Evening with David Peel (1976)
- Bring Back the Beatles (1977)
- King of Punk (1978)
- "Junk Rock" (1979)
- Death to Disco (1980)
- John Lennon for President (1980)
- Animal In Love (1982)
- 1984 (1984)
- Search to Destroy (1986)
- John Lennon Forever (1987)
- World War III (1987)
- Anarchy in New York City (1993)
- Battle for New York (1994)
- War and Anarchy (1994)
- Noiseville (1995)
- Up Against the Wall (1995)
- Legalize Marijuana (2002)
- Long Live the Grateful Dead (2002)
- Rock 'n' Roll Outlaw (2002)
- Jirokichi Live at Koenji (2004)
- Marijuana Christmas (2008)
- Anthology (2012)
- Up Against the Wall Street (2013)
- Give Hemp A Chance (2015)

== Film ==
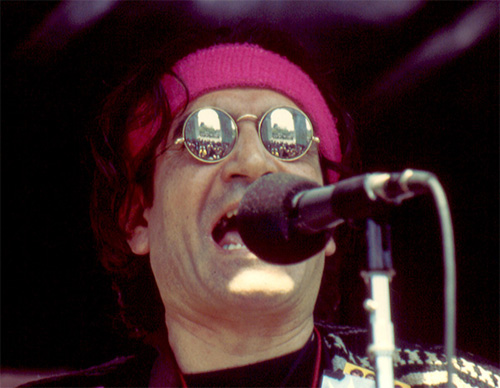
Peel in Washington Square Park, 1994 Pot Parade

Peel has appeared as himself in various films, including Please Stand By (1972), Rude Awakening (1989), High Times' Potluck (2004) and The U.S. vs. John Lennon (2006).

In Jack Milton's film Please Stand By, Peel portrays and stars as a media hippie revolutionary, who hijacks a network television van and jams the airwaves with unauthorized radical broadcasts to the nation.

He is also featured as himself in the documentary film, Tangled Up With Dylan: The Ballad of AJ Weberman. The film, made in 2005, won the Raindance Award at the British Independent Film Awards and was directed by James Bluemel and Oliver Ralfe, and features a number of performances by David Peel.

== See also ==
- Counterculture
- Vietnam War
- Danny Says
