= The Lower East Side Band =

American rock band

The Lower East Side Band was an American rock band from Manhattan, New York.

== History ==
Formed to support David Peel in 1967, the Lower East Side Band originally consisted of Harold C. Black and Billy Joe White. They soon became popular enough in New York City's then thriving downtown counterculture that they were signed to Elektra Records in 1968. With the addition of Larry Adam and George Cori to the line-up, the band recorded with David Peel on the Have a Marijuana album conceptualized by Danny Fields as a collection of drinking songs for pot smokers.

In 1970 The Lower East Side Band recorded their second album, The American Revolution, which was also released by Elektra Records (now part of Warner Music Group) on the Sire Records imprint. In 1971, after the record was released and the band toured in support of it, Harold C. Black and Billy Joe White left to form the glitter rock band Teenage Lust. Harold went on to run New York City's after-hours nightclub the 210 Club. They were replaced by Tommy Doyle, Frank Lanci and Billy Minelli. In the mid-seventies, the Lower East Side band was produced by its long-time friend and admirer John Lennon for Apple Records. Lennon then produced Peel's album, The Pope Smokes Dope, which was banned in several countries outside the United States and Canada.

In the late 1970s, the Lower East Side Band included Eddie and his brother Moses from the Bronx, as well as Andi Anderson aka Andrew Stergiou. They regularly appeared with David Peel on Michael Luckman's Underground Tonight Show, an early cable TV program broadcast on Sterling Manhattan Cable TV public broadcast channels. Sterling Manhattan Cable was later to become part of HBO in the Time-Warner group.

The Lower East Side band was part of the Plastic Ono Band that appeared on The David Frost Show with John Lennon and Yoko Ono. They also performed at the first Manhattan New York City smoke-in hosted by the Yippies, as well as the first Washington, D.C. smoke-in, which was broadcast on both television and radio.

== See also ==
- John Sinclair
- Abbie Hoffman
- Dana Beal
