= Bobbie Gentry discography =

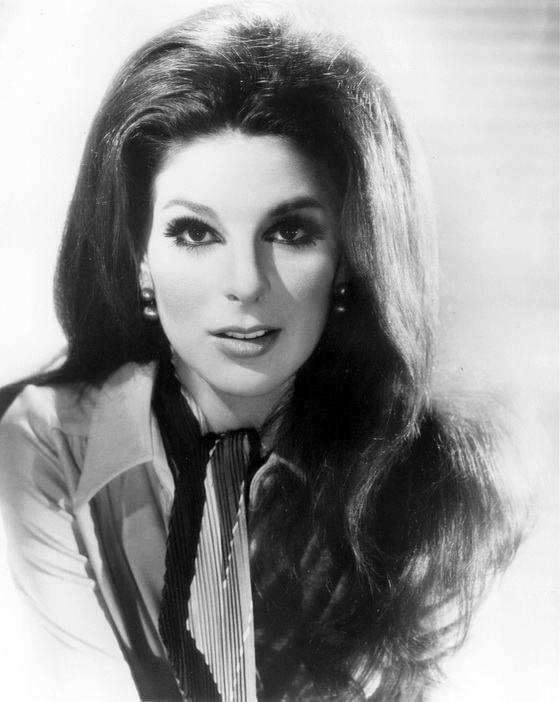
- Gentry in a publicity photo for Capitol Records in 1969
- Studio albums: 7
- EPs: 15
- Live albums: 1
- Compilation albums: 30
- Singles: 31
- Soundtrack albums: 1

The discography of American singer-songwriter Bobbie Gentry consists of seven studio albums, one live album, one soundtrack album and thirty compilation albums. Gentry also released a total of thirty-one singles and fifteen extended plays.

Gentry rose to international fame with her intriguing Southern Gothic narrative "Ode to Billie Joe" in 1967. The track spent four weeks as the No. 1 pop song on the Billboard Hot 100 chart and was fourth in the Billboard year-end chart of 1967 and earned her Grammy awards for Best New Artist and Best Female Pop Vocal Performance in 1968. The album's second single, "I Saw an Angel Die", did not chart.

Following the success of her debut single and album, Gentry's second studio album, The Delta Sweete, was released in February 1968. It did not reach the same level of commercial success as her first album. The two US singles, "Okolona River Bottom Band" and "Louisiana Man", peaked at No. 54 and No. 100, respectively, on the Billboard Hot 100. "Big Boss Man" was released as a single in France and did not chart.

Local Gentry, her third studio album, was released a short six months later in August 1968. Two singles were released from this album, "Sweete Peony" and "The Fool on the Hill", neither of which charted.

In September 1968, Gentry was paired with Glen Campbell and the duo released a collaboration album, Bobbie Gentry and Glen Campbell. The album spawned two singles, "Mornin' Glory" and "Let It Be Me".

Gentry's fifth studio album Touch 'Em with Love was released in July 1969. "Touch 'Em with Love" was released as the first single and "I'll Never Fall in Love Again" was released as the second single in Europe.

Fancy, Gentry's sixth studio album, was released in April 1970. The album's first single, "Fancy", peaked at No. 31 on the Billboard Hot 100 and No. 26 on the Top Country Songs chart. Three additional singles were released from the album, "Raindrops Keep Fallin' on My Head", "He Made a Woman Out of Me", and "If You Gotta Make a Fool Out of Somebody".

In April 1971, Gentry released her seventh studio album, Patchwork, which would become her final album. Two singles were released from the album, "But I Can't Get Back" and "Somebody Like Me".

== Albums ==
=== Studio albums ===
List of albums, with selected chart positions and certifications, showing year released and album name
Title	Album details	Peak chart positions							Certifications
Title	Album details	US	US Country	US R&B	US CB	US CB Country	CAN	UK	Certifications
Ode to Billie Joe	Released: August 21, 1967; Label: Capitol (ST-2830); Formats: Vinyl	1	1	5	1	1	17	—	RIAA: Gold
The Delta Sweete	Released: February 5, 1968; Label: Capitol (ST-2842); Formats: Vinyl	132	—	—	72	26	—	—	
Local Gentry	Released: August 26, 1968; Label: Capitol (ST-2964); Formats: Vinyl	—	—	—	83	—	—	—	
Bobbie Gentry and Glen Campbell (with Glen Campbell)	Released: September 16, 1968; Label: Capitol (ST-2928); Formats: Vinyl	11	1	—	10	2	8	50	RIAA: Gold
Touch 'Em with Love	Released: July 7, 1969; Label: Capitol (ST-155); Formats: Vinyl	164	42	—	—	—	—	21	
Fancy	Released: April 6, 1970; Label: Capitol (ST-428); Formats: Vinyl	96	34	—	83	—	79	—	
Patchwork	Released: April 26, 1971; Label: Capitol (ST-494); Formats: Vinyl	221	—	—	—	29	—	—	
"—" denotes releases that did not chart or were not released in that country.

=== Live albums ===
List of albums, showing relevant details
Title	Album details
Live at the BBC	Released: April 21, 2018; Label: Capitol, UMC (6717729); Formats: Vinyl

=== Soundtrack albums ===
List of albums, showing relevant details
Title	Album details
Ode to Billy Joe (Sound Track from Max Baer's Motion Picture)	Released: May 10, 1976; Label: Warner Bros. (BS 2947); Formats: Vinyl

=== Compilation albums ===
List of albums, with selected chart positions and certifications, showing other relevant details
Title	Album details	Peak chart positions
Title	Album details	US
Bobbie Gentry’s Greatest	Release date: October 1969; Label: Capitol Records; Format: Vinyl	180
Portrait	Release date: 1970; Label: Capitol Records; Format: Vinyl	—
Gigantes De La Canción, Vol. 16	Release date: 1970; Label: Capitol Records; Format: Vinyl	—
Sittin' Pretty	Release date: 1971; Label: Capitol Records; Format: Vinyl	—
Tobacco Road	Release date: 1971; Label: Capitol Records; Format: Vinyl	—
Your No. 1 Fan	Release date: 1971; Label: Capitol Records; Format: Vinyl	—
The Very Best of Bobbie Gentry	Release date: 1972; Label: Capitol Records; Format: Vinyl	—
Way Down South	Release date: 1972; Label: mfp; Format: Vinyl	—
Bobbie Gentry's Greatest Hits	Release date: 1974; Label: Capitol Records; Format: Vinyl	—
All I Have to Do Is Dream (with Glen Campbell)	Release date: 1983; Label: mfp; Format: Vinyl, cassette	—
Glen Campbell Sings with Anne Murray and Bobbie Gentry	Release date: 1983; Label: MFP Holland; Format: Vinyl	—
Greatest Hits	Release date: October 25, 1990; Label: Curb Records; Format: CD	—
Country Classics	Release date: 1991; Label: Capitol Records; Format: CD	—
Ode to Billie Joe	Release date: 1992; Label: Curb Records; Format: CD	—
The Best of Bobbie Gentry	Release date: 1993; Label: Capitol Records; Format: CD	—
Bobbie Gentry: The Hit Albums (contains Ode to Billie Joe and Bobbie Gentry and Glen Campbell)	Release date: 1995; Label: Disky; Format: CD	—
The Golden Classics of Bobbie Gentry	Release date: 1997; Label: EMI; Format: CD	—
The Bobbie Gentry Collection	Release date: 2000; Label: HMV Easy; Format: CD	—
Ode to Bobbie Gentry: The Capitol Years	Release date: September 4, 2000; Label: Zonophone; Format: CD	—
An American Quilt, 1967–1974	Release date: October 7, 2002; Label: Raven Records; Format: CD	—
Chickasaw County Child: The Artistry of Bobbie Gentry	Release date: April 13, 2004; Label: Shout! Factory; Format: CD	—
The Very Best of Bobbie Gentry	Release date: June 20, 2005; Label: EMI Gold; Format: CD	—
The Delta Sweete / Local Gentry	Release date: May 12, 2006; Label: Raven Records; Format: CD	—
The Best of the Capitol Years	Release date: February 26, 2007; Label: Zonophone; Format: CD	—
Patchwork / Fancy	Release date: May 15, 2007; Label: Raven Records; Format: CD	—
Ode to Billie Joe / Touch 'Em with Love	Release date: October 14, 2008; Label: Raven Records; Format: CD	—
Bobbie Gentry and Glen Campbell • Anne Murray / Glen Campbell (2 Classic Albums on 1 CD)	Release date: October 15, 2012; Label: Morello Records; Format: CD	—
I'll Never Fall in Love Again	Release date: March 23, 2015; Label: Spectrum Music; Format: CD	—
Southern Gothic: The Definitive Collection	Release date: December 4, 2015; Label: Hump Head Records; Format: CD	—
The Girl from Chickasaw County: The Complete Capitol Masters	Release date: September 21, 2018; Label: Capitol Records, UM^{e}; Format: CD, digital download	—
The Windows of the World	Release date: July 17, 2021; Label: Capitol Records, UM^{e}; Format: LP	— (Note: 'The Windows of the World' did not enter the US Billboard 200, but did peak at number 82 on the Top Album Sales chart and number 5 on Traditional Jazz Album chart.)
"—" denotes a recording that did not chart or was not released in that territory.

== Extended plays ==
List of extended plays, showing relevant details
Title	Details
Ode to Billie Joe	Released: 1967 (Portugal); Label: Capitol (EAP 5-2830); Formats: Vinyl; Track listing: A1. "Ode to Billie Joe" B1. "Mississippi Delta" B2. "Papa, Won't You Let Me Go to Town with You?"
Ode to Billie Joe	Released: 1967 (Spain); Label: Capitol (EAP 4-2830); Formats: Vinyl; Track listing: A1. "Ode to Billie Joe" A2. "Bugs" B1. "Mississippi Delta" B2. "Niki Hoeky"
Ode to Billie Joe	Released: 1968 (Australia); Label: Capitol (EAP-21163); Formats: Vinyl; Track listing: A1. "Okolona River Bottom Band" A2. "Niki Hoeky" B1. "Louisiana Man" B2. "Ode to Billie Joe"
Louisiana Man	Released: 1968 (Portugal); Label: Capitol (EAP-21079); Formats: Vinyl; Track listing: A1. "Louisiana Man" A2. "Penduli Pendulum" B1. "Courtyard" B2. "Okolona River Bottom Band"
The Fool on the Hill	Released: 1968 (Portugal); Label: Capitol (EAP-21202); Formats: Vinyl; Track listing: A1. "The Fool on the Hill" A2. "Recollection" B1. "Hushabye Mountain" B2. "Eleanor Rigby"
I'll Never Fall in Love Again	Released: 1969 (Portugal); Label: Capitol (EAP-21448); Formats: Vinyl; Track listing: A1. "I'll Never Fall in Love Again" A2. "Casket Vignette" B1. "Ace Insurance Man" B2. "Sweete Peony"
Heart to Heart Talk (with Glen Campbell)	Released: 1969 (Singapore, Malaysia, Hong Kong); Label: Capitol (EAP-21539); Formats: Vinyl; Track listing: A1. "Heart to Heart Talk" A2. "My Elusive Dreams" B1. "All I Have to Do Is Dream" B2. "Little Green Apples"
I'll Never Fall in Love Again	Released: 1970 (Australia, New Zealand); Label: Capitol (EAP-21566); Formats: Vinyl; Track listing: A1. "Fancy" A2. "Raindrops Keep Falling on My Head" B1. "Seasons Come, Seasons Go" B2. "I'll Never Fall in Love Again"
Bobbie Gentry	Released: 1970 (Israel); Label: Capitol (T 12009); Formats: Vinyl; Track listing: A1. "I'll Never Fall in Love Again" A2. "Fancy" B1. "All I Have to Do Is Dream" (with Glen Campbell) B2. "Mississippi Delta"
Bobbie Gentry and Glen Campbell (with Glen Campbell)	Released: 1970 (Mexico); Label: Capitol (EAP-21611); Formats: Vinyl; Track listing: A1. "All I Have to Do Is Dream" A2. "Walk Right Back" B1. "Little Green Apples" B2. "Let It Be Me"
Bobbie Gentry and Glen Campbell (with Glen Campbell)	Released: 1970 (Portugal); Label: Capitol (8 E016-80335 M); Formats: Vinyl; Track listing: A1. "All I Have to Do Is Dream" A2. "Terrible Tangled Web" B1. "Walk Right Back" B2. "Sunday Mornin'"
If You Gotta Make a Fool of Somebody	Released: 1970 (Portugal); Label: Capitol (8 E016-80432 M); Formats: Vinyl; Track listing: A1. "If You Gotta Make a Fool of Somebody" A2. "Eleanor Rigby" B1. "Billy the Kid" B2. "Here, There and Everywhere"
Raindrops Keep Falling on My Head	Released: 1970 (Singapore); Label: Capitol (EAP-21616); Formats: Vinyl; Track listing: A1. "Raindrops Keep Falling on My Head" A2. "Fancy" B1. "He Made a Woman Out of Me" B2. "You've Made Me So Very Happy"
2 Plus 2, Vol. 37	Released: 1977 (Germany); Label: Capitol (1 C 016-85 120); Formats: Vinyl; Track listing: A1. "Ode to Billie Joe" A2. "Raindrops Keep Falling on My Head" B1. "I'll Never Fall in Love Again" B2. "Mississippi Delta"
The Girl from Chickasaw County	Released: August 16, 2018; Label: Capitol, UMG; Formats: Streaming; Track listing: 1. "Hurry, Tuesday Child" (Demo); 2. "Sweet Peony" (Alternate Take); 3. "God Bless the Child"; 4. "Smoke"

== Singles ==
=== As lead artist ===
Title	Year	Peak chart positions															Album
Title	Year	US	US AC	US Country	AU	BE	CAN	CAN AC	CAN Country	DE	IE	NL	NO	NZ	SA	UK	Album
"Stranger in the Mirror" (with Jody Reynolds)	1966	—	—	—	—	—	—	—	—	—	—	—	—	—	—	—	Non-album single
"Ode to Billie Joe"	1967	1	7	17	6	35	1	—	—	23	6	12	—	3	11	13	Ode to Billie Joe
"I Saw an Angel Die"	1967	—	—	—	—	—	—	—	—	—	—	—	—	—	—	—	Ode to Billie Joe
"Mississippi Delta"	1967	—	—	—	—	—	—	—	—	—	—	—	—	—	—	—	Ode to Billie Joe
"Okolona River Bottom Band"	1967	54	—	—	—	tip (Note: In addition to the main Ultratop 50, another weekly singles chart known as Ultratip is published. Also referred to as the Tipparade, it is an indicator chart of commercially available singles.)	49	—	—	—	—	—	—	—	—	—	The Delta Sweete
"La Siepe"	1968	—	—	—	—	—	—	—	—	—	—	—	—	—	—	—	Non-album single
"Louisiana Man"	1968	100	—	72	23	—	—	—	—	—	—	—	—	20	—	—	The Delta Sweete
"Refractions"	1968	—	—	—	—	—	—	—	—	—	—	—	—	—	—	—	The Delta Sweete
"Big Boss Man"	1968	—	—	—	—	—	—	—	—	—	—	—	—	—	—	—	The Delta Sweete
"Sweete Peony"	1968	—	—	—	—	—	—	—	—	—	—	—	—	—	—	—	Local Gentry
"Hushabye Mountain"	1968	—	—	—	—	—	—	—	—	—	—	—	—	—	—	—	Non-album single
"Mornin' Glory" (with Glen Campbell)	1968	74	32	—	—	—	81	—	—	—	—	—	—	—	—	—	Bobbie Gentry and Glen Campbell
"The Fool on the Hill"	1968	—	—	—	—	—	—	—	—	—	—	—	—	—	—	—	Local Gentry
"Little Green Apples" (with Glen Campbell)	1968	—	—	—	—	—	—	—	—	—	—	—	—	—	—	—	Bobbie Gentry and Glen Campbell
"フール·オン·ザ·ヒル" ("Fool on the Hill")	1969	—	—	—	—	—	—	—	—	—	—	—	—	—	—	—	Non-album single
"Let It Be Me" (with Glen Campbell)	1969	36	7	14	—	—	85	15	1	—	—	—	—	—	—	—	Bobbie Gentry and Glen Campbell
"Touch 'Em with Love"	1969	— (Note: "Touch 'Em with Love" did not enter the Billboard Hot 100, but peaked at number 113 on the Bubbling Under the Hot 100 chart.)	—	—	—	—	—	—	—	—	—	—	—	—	—	—	Touch 'Em with Love
"I'll Never Fall in Love Again"	1969	—	—	—	5	tip	—	—	—	27	1	—	5	5	3	1	Touch 'Em with Love
"Fancy"	1969	31	8	26	70	—	26	20	1	—	—	—	—	—	—	—	Fancy
"All I Have to Do Is Dream" (with Glen Campbell)	1969	27	4	6	3	—	29	3	2	—	2	—	4	7	3	3	Non-album single
"Raindrops Keep Fallin' on My Head"	1970	—	—	—	—	—	—	—	—	—	—	—	—	—	—	40	Fancy
"He Made a Woman Out of Me"	1970	71	—	—	—	—	57	—	—	—	—	—	—	—	—	—	Fancy
"If You Gotta Make a Fool of Somebody"	1970	—	—	—	—	—	—	—	—	—	—	—	—	—	—	—	Fancy
"No Me Quiero Enamorar" ("I'll Never Fall in Love Again")	1970	—	—	—	—	—	—	—	—	—	—	—	—	—	—	—	Non-album single
"Apartment 21"	1970	81	19	—	—	—	68	—	—	—	—	—	—	—	—	—	Non-album single
"But I Can't Get Back"	1971	—	37	—	—	—	93	—	—	—	—	—	—	—	—	—	Patchwork
"Somebody Like Me"	1971	—	—	—	—	—	—	—	—	—	—	—	—	—	—	—	Patchwork
"The Girl from Cincinnati"	1972	—	—	—	—	—	—	—	—	—	—	—	—	—	—	—	Non-album single
"Another Place, Another Time"	1975	—	—	—	—	—	—	—	—	—	—	—	—	—	—	—	Non-album single
"Ode to Billy Joe - Main Title"	1976	65	—	—	—	—	92	46	—	—	—	—	—	—	—	—	Ode to Billy Joe (Sound Track from Max Baer's Motion Picture)
"Steal Away"	1978	—	—	—	—	—	—	—	—	—	—	—	—	—	—	—	Non-album single
"—" denotes releases that did not chart or were not released in that country.

=== Charted B-sides ===
Title	Year	Peak chart positions	A-side
Title	Year	US Country	A-side
"Less of Me" (with Glen Campbell)	1968	44	"Mornin' Glory"
"—" denotes releases that did not chart or were not released in that country.

=== Promotional singles ===
Title	Year	Album
"I Wonder as I Wander" (Live on The Ed Sullivan Show, December 24, 1967)	2020	Non-album single
"I Want You Back" (Live on The Ed Sullivan Show, November 1, 1970)	2021	Non-album single
"Your Number One Fan" (Live on The Ed Sullivan Show, November 1, 1970)	2021	Non-album single
"Benjamin" (Live on The Ed Sullivan Show, November 1, 1970)	2021	Non-album single
"Papa, Won't You Let Me Go to Town with You / Ode to Billie Joe" (Live on The Ed Sullivan Show, March 29, 1970)	2021	Non-album single
"He Made a Woman Out of Me / Up on Cripple Creek" (Live on The Ed Sullivan Show, December 27, 1970)	2021	Non-album single
"But I Can't Get Back / I'll Fly Away / Put a Little Love in Your Heart" (with Goose Creek Symphony) (Live on The Ed Sullivan Show, December 27, 1970)	2021	Non-album single
