= The Girl from Chickasaw County: The Complete Capitol Masters =

2018 box set compilation album by Bobbie Gentry

Compilation album by Bobbie Gentry
- Released: September 21, 2018
- Recorded: 1967–1972
- Studio: Whitney Recording Studio (Glendale); Capitol Recording Studio (Hollywood); EMI Studios (London); Columbia Recording Studio (Nashville, Tennessee; Nashville); Fame Recording Studios (Muscle Shoals); Hollywood Sound Studios (Hollywood); BBC Television Centre (White City)
- Genre: Pop, Country, Americana
- Length: 504:52
- Label: Capitol; UM^{e}
- Producer: Bobbie Gentry · Bobby Paris · Kelly Gordon · Al DeLory · Kelso Herston · Rick Hall · Stanley Dorfman · John Guess · Andrew Batt

Bobbie Gentry chronology
Live at the BBC (2018)	The Girl from Chickasaw County: The Complete Capitol Masters (2018)

The Girl from Chickasaw County: The Complete Capitol Masters
- Promotional image showing the contents of the 8-disc box set.

Professional ratings
Review scores
Source	Rating
AllMusic	4.5/5 stars
Daily Mirror	4/5 stars
HiFi Choice	5/5 stars
Record Collector	5/5 stars
Shindig!	5/5 stars
The Sun	4/5 stars
The Times	5/5 stars

The Girl from Chickasaw County: The Complete Capitol Masters is an out-of-print 8-disc box set compilation album by singer-songwriter Bobbie Gentry. It was released on September 21, 2018, by Capitol and UM^{e}. It features Gentry's entire recording career with Capitol Records, bringing together 7 studio albums, 75 previously unreleased tracks, including demos, alternate takes and live recordings from Gentry's BBC television series.

It was nominated for the Grammy Award for Best Historical Album at the 62nd Annual Grammy Awards.

== Background ==
Announced on July 27, 2018, Gentry's 76th birthday, the album includes Gentry's six solo albums, her collaboration album with Glen Campbell as well as over 70 previously unreleased recordings, including live recordings from Gentry's 1968-1971 BBC series. The release has specially commissioned cover art by David Downton, and contains an 84-page book, eight postcards and a copy of Gentry's original handwritten lyrics to her iconic hit, “Ode to Billie Joe”. The set was compiled by Andrew Batt who produced the unreleased material and wrote the essay included in the book.

== Track listing ==
Disc 1 – Ode to Billie Joe
No.	Title	Writer(s)	Length
1.	"Mississippi Delta"	Bobbie Gentry	3:05
2.	"I Saw an Angel Die"	Gentry	2:58
3.	"Chickasaw County Child"	Gentry	2:45
4.	"Sunday Best"	Gentry	2:43
5.	"Niki Hoeky"	Jim Ford, Lolly Vegas, Pat Vegas	2:45
6.	"Papa, Won't Let Me Go to Town with You"	Gentry	2:32
7.	"Bugs"	Gentry	2:07
8.	"Hurry, Tuesday Child"	Gentry	3:52
9.	"Lazy Willie"	Gentry	2:41
10.	"Ode to Billie Joe"	Gentry	4:16
11.	"The Seventh Son" (Demo)	Willie Dixon	2:25
12.	"I Saw an Angel Die" (Demo)	Gentry	2:53
13.	"Niki Hoeky" (Demo)	Ford, L. Vegas, P. Vegas	2:42
14.	"Papa, Won't You Let Me Go to Town with You" (Demo)	Gentry	2:31
15.	"Hurry, Tuesday Child" (Demo)	Gentry	3:50
16.	"Mississippi Delta" (Alternate Version)	Gentry	3:06
17.	"Sunday Best" (Alternate Take)	Gentry	2:34
18.	"Show Off" (Stereo Version)	Gentry	2:46
19.	"La Siepe" ("The Hedge")	Pino Massara, Vito Pallavicini	4:03
20.	"La Città è Grande" ("The City Is Great")	Mansueto De Ponti, Pallavicini	2:19

- Tracks 1–10 from Ode to Billie Joe (1967).
- Tracks 11–17 previously unreleased.
- Track 18 released in mono on Ode to Bobbie Gentry: The Capitol Years (2000).
- Tracks 19–20 from Capitol single QCL 197 (1968).

Disc 2 – The Delta Sweete
No.	Title	Writer(s)	Length
1.	"Okolona River Bottom Band"	Bobbie Gentry	2:56
2.	"Big Boss Man"	Luther Dixon, Al Smith	3:00
3.	"Reunion"	Gentry	2:37
4.	"Parchman Farm"	Mose Allison	3:12
5.	"Mornin' Glory"	Gentry	3:09
6.	"Sermon"	Gentry	2:33
7.	"Tobacco Road"	John D. Loudermilk	2:51
8.	"Penduli Pendulum"	Gentry	1:55
9.	"Jessye' Lisabeth"	Gentry	3:03
10.	"Refractions"	Gentry	2:28
11.	"Louisiana Man"	Doug Kershaw	2:39
12.	"Courtyard"	Gentry	2:58
13.	"The Seventh Son" (Band Version)	Willie Dixon, Gentry	2:52
14.	"Feelin' Good" (Demo)	Leslie Bricusse, Anthony Newley	3:21
15.	"I Didn't Know" (Demo)	Gentry	3:03
16.	"Morning to Midnight" (Demo)	Gentry	3:29
17.	"Refractions" (Demo)	Gentry	2:30
18.	"Louisiana Man" (Demo)	Kershaw	2:20
19.	"Sermon" (Demo)	Gentry	2:24
20.	"Mornin' Glory" (Demo)	Gentry	3:04
21.	"Jessye' Lisabeth" (Demo)	Gentry	3:12
22.	"Courtyard" (Demo)	Gentry	2:54
23.	"Louisiana Man" (Live, The Tom Jones Show, July 6, 1968)	Kershaw	3:24
24.	"Ode to Billie Joe" (Live, The Tom Jones Show, July 6, 1968)	Gentry	5:16

- Tracks 1–12 from The Delta Sweete (1968).
- Tracks 13–24 previously unreleased.
- Note: The dates listed with tracks 23 and 24 are episode airdates, not recording dates.

Disc 3 – Local Gentry
No.	Title	Writer(s)	Length
1.	"Sweete Peony"	Bobbie Gentry	2:27
2.	"Casket Vignette"	Gentry	2:32
3.	"Come Away, Melinda"	Fred Hellerman, Fran Minkoff	3:21
4.	"The Fool on the Hill"	John Lennon, Paul McCartney	2:45
5.	"Papa's Medicine Show"	Jamie Horton	3:48
6.	"Ace Insurance Man"	Gentry	3:32
7.	"Recollection"	Gentry	2:07
8.	"Sittin' Pretty"	Gentry, Kelly Gordon	3:20
9.	"Eleanor Rigby"	Lennon, McCartney	2:29
10.	"Peaceful"	Kenny Rankin	2:51
11.	"Here, There and Everywhere"	Lennon, McCartney	2:31
12.	"Hushabye Mountain"	Richard Sherman, Robert Sherman	2:48
13.	"Skip-a-Long Sam"	Donovan Philips Leitch	2:39
14.	"The Conspiracy of Homer Jones"	Dallas Frazier, A.L. Owens	2:34
15.	"Sweete Peony" (Alternate Version)	Gentry	2:26
16.	"Cotton Candy Sandman" (Demo)	Kenny Rankin	2:06
17.	"Hushabye Mountain" (Demo)	Richard Sherman, Robert Sherman	3:02

- Tracks 1–11 from Local Gentry (1968).
- Track 12 from Capitol single 2295 (1968).
- Track 13 from Ode to Bobbie Gentry: The Capitol Years (2000).
- Tracks 14–17 previously unreleased.

Disc 4 – Bobbie Gentry and Glen Campbell
No.	Title	Writer(s)	Length
1.	"Less of Me" (with Glen Campbell)	Glen Campbell	2:08
2.	"Little Green Apples" (with Glen Campbell)	Bob Russell	3:12
3.	"Gentle on My Mind" (with Glen Campbell)	John Hartford	3:07
4.	"Heart to Heart Talk" (with Glen Campbell)	Lee Ross	2:52
5.	"My Elusive Dreams" (with Glen Campbell)	Curly Putman, Billy Sherrill	3:10
6.	"(It's Only Your) Imagination" (with Glen Campbell)	Campbell	1:49
7.	"Mornin' Glory" (with Glen Campbell)	Bobbie Gentry	2:52
8.	"Terrible Tangled Web" (with Glen Campbell)	Billy Mize	2:02
9.	"Sunday Mornin'" (with Glen Campbell)	Margo Guryan	2:30
10.	"Let It Be Me" (with Glen Campbell)	Gilbert Bécaud, Mann Curtis, Pierre Delanoé	2:03
11.	"Scarborough Fair / Canticle" (with Glen Campbell)	Traditional; arr. by Paul Simon, Art Garfunkel	3:18
12.	"All I Have to Do Is Dream" (with Glen Campbell)	Boudleaux Bryant	2:31
13.	"Walk Right Back" (with Glen Campbell)	Sonny Curtis	2:17
14.	"Sunday Mornin'" (Alternate Version) (with Glen Campbell)	Guryan	2:27
15.	"Let It Be Me" (Undubbed Version) (with Glen Campbell)	Bécaud, M. Curtis, Delanoé	2:03
16.	"Scarborough Fair / Canticle" (Undubbed Version) (with Glen Campbell)	Traditional; arr. by Simon, Garfunkel	3:17
17.	"Love Took My Heart and Mashed That Sucker Flat" (with Kelly Gordon)	Kelly Gordon	2:13
18.	"フール·オン·ザ·ヒル" ("The Fool on the Hill" Japanese Version)	John Lennon, Paul McCartney	3:45
19.	"No Me Quiero Enamorar" ("I'll Never Fall in Love Again" Spanish Version)	Burt Bacharach, Hal David	2:53
20.	"En Todas Partes" ("Here, There and Everywhere" Spanish Version)	Lennon, McCartney	2:18

- Tracks 1–11 from Bobbie Gentry and Glen Campbell (1968).
- Tracks 12–13 from Capitol single 2745 (1970).
- Tracks 14–16 previously unreleased.
- Track 17 from Kelly Gordon's album Defunked (1969).
- Track 18 from Capitol single CR 2232 (1969).
- Tracks 19–20 from Capitol single 006-80.328 (1970).

Disc 5 – Touch 'Em with Love
No.	Title	Writer(s)	Length
1.	"Touch 'Em with Love"	John Hurley, Ronnie Wilkins	2:02
2.	"Greyhound Goin' Somewhere"	Bill Dorsey, Michael Martin Murphey	2:23
3.	"Natural to Be Gone"	John Hartford	2:19
4.	"Seasons Come, Seasons Go"	Bobbie Gentry	2:49
5.	"Glory Hallelujah, How They'll Sing"	Gentry	2:32
6.	"I Wouldn't Be Surprised"	Larry Henley, Marc Mathis	3:22
7.	"Son of a Preacher Man"	Hurley, Wilkins	2:04
8.	"Where's the Playground, Johnny"	Jimmy Webb	2:29
9.	"I'll Never Fall in Love Again"	Burt Bacharach, Hal David	2:52
10.	"You've Made Me So Very Happy"	Berry Gordy, Jr., Frank Wilson, Patrice Holloway, Brenda Holloway	3:19
11.	"More Today Than Yesterday"	Pat Upton	2:32
12.	"Spinning Wheel"	David Clayton-Thomas	2:39
13.	"Touch 'Em with Love" (Stereo Version)	Hurley, Wilkins	2:13
14.	"Glory Hallelujah, How They'll Sing" (Alternate Take)	Gentry	2:43
15.	"Seasons Come, Seasons Go" (Demo)	Gentry	2:51
16.	"Suppertime"	Irving Berlin	3:08
17.	"God Bless the Child"	Billie Holiday, Arthur Herzog, Jr.	2:59
18.	"Since I Fell for You"	Buddy Johnson	2:56
19.	"Save Your Love for Me"	Johnson	3:45
20.	"Here's That Rainy Day"	Jimmy Van Heusen, Johnny Burke	2:39
21.	"Stormy"	Dennis Yost, James Cobb, Buddy Buie	3:28
22.	"This Girl’s in Love with You"	Bacharach, David	3:11
23.	"The Windows of the World"	Bacharach, David	2:57

- Tracks 1–10 from Touch 'Em with Love (1969). Track 9 also appeared on Fancy.
- Tracks 11–20, 22 previously unreleased.
- Track 21 from Ode to Bobbie Gentry: The Capitol Years (2000).
- Track 23 from The Best of the Capitol Years (2007).

Disc 6 – Fancy
No.	Title	Writer(s)	Length
1.	"Fancy"	Bobbie Gentry	4:14
2.	"Delta Man"	Leon Russell	3:02
3.	"Something in the Way He Moves"	James Taylor	2:33
4.	"Find 'Em, Fool 'Em and Forget 'Em"	George Jackson, Rick Hall	2:37
5.	"He Made a Woman Out of Me"	Fred Burch, Don Hill	2:32
6.	"Raindrops Keep Fallin' on My Head"	Bacharach, David	3:08
7.	"If You Gotta Make a Fool of Somebody"	Rudy Clark	2:20
8.	"Rainmaker"	Harry Nilsson, Bill Martin	2:39
9.	"Wedding Bell Blues"	Laura Nyro	3:13
10.	"In the Ghetto"	Mac Davis	2:49
11.	"Fancy" (Mono Radio Edit)	Gentry	3:15
12.	"Apartment 21"	John Wilkin	3:18
13.	"Away in a Manger"	Traditional	2:37
14.	"Scarlet Ribbons"	Evelyn Danzig, Jack Segal	2:36
15.	"Circle 'Round the Sun"	Traditional	3:01
16.	"Raindrops Keep Falling on My Head" (Alternate Take)	Bacharach, David	2:39
17.	"Wedding Bell Blues" (Alternate Take)	Nyro	3:06
18.	"Apartment 21" (Undubbed)	Wilkin	3:19
19.	"Scarlett Ribbons" (Alternate Version)	Danzig, Segal	2:36
20.	"If You Gotta Make a Fool of Somebody" (Live, Top of the Pops, April 30, 1970)	Clark	2:04

- Tracks 1–9 from Fancy (1970).
- Track 10 from I'll Never Fall in Love Again (1970).
- Tracks 11, 15–20 previously unreleased.
- Track 12 from Capitol single 2849 (1970).
- Track 13–14 from The Christmas Sound of Music (1969).
- Note: The date listed with track 20 is the episode airdate, not recording date.

Disc 7 – Patchwork
No.	Title	Writer(s)	Length
1.	"Benjamin"	Bobbie Gentry	3:41
2.	"Interlude 1"	Gentry, Larry Muhoberac	0:40
3.	"Marigolds and Tangerines"	Gentry	2:07
4.	"Interlude 2"	Gentry, Muhoberac	0:36
5.	"Billy the Kid"	Gentry	2:03
6.	"Interlude 3"	Gentry, Muhoberac	0:37
7.	"Beverly"	Gentry	3:06
8.	"Interlude 4"	Gentry, Muhoberac	0:42
9.	"Miss Clara / Azusa Sue"	Gentry	4:21
10.	"Interlude 5"	Gentry, Muhoberac	0:21
11.	"But I Can't Get Back"	Gentry, Kelly Gordon	3:31
12.	"Jeremiah"	Gentry	5:23
13.	"Interlude 6"	Gentry, Muhoberac	0:52
14.	"Belinda"	Gentry	4:05
15.	"Mean Stepmama Blues"	Gentry	3:58
16.	"Your Number One Fan"	Gentry	2:33
17.	"Interlude 7"	Gentry, Muhoberac	0:20
18.	"Somebody Like Me"	Gentry	3:25
19.	"Lookin' In"	Gentry	4:39
20.	"Smoke"	Gentry	2:58
21.	"Joanne"	Gentry	3:17
22.	"Salome Smith and Her Amazing Dancing Bear"	Randy Newman	2:16
23.	"Benjamin" (Alternate Take)	Gentry	3:31
24.	"Belinda" (Alternate Version)	Gentry	4:05
25.	"Smoke" (Demo)	Gentry	3:03
26.	"The Girl from Cincinnati"	Chris Ducey, Ed Millis, Kendrew Lascelles	3:30
27.	"You and Me Together"	Gentry	3:58

- Tracks 1–19 from Patchwork (1971). Track 5 also appeared on I'll Never Fall in Love Again (1970).
- Track 20 from The Best of the Capitol Years (2007).
- Tracks 21, 23–25 previously unreleased.
- Track 22 from 20 Years: Bear Family Records, 1975—1995 (1995).
- Tracks 26–27 from Capitol single 3413 (1972).

Disc 8 – Live at the BBC
No.	Title	Writer(s)	Length
1.	"Mississippi Delta" (Live, August 3, 1968)	Bobbie Gentry	3:02
2.	"Papa, Woncha Let Me Go to Town with You" (Live, August 3, 1968)	Gentry	2:52
3.	"I Saw an Angel Die" (Live, August 3, 1968)	Gentry	3:30
4.	"My Dog Sargent" (Live, August 3, 1968)	Gentry	1:12
5.	"Ode to Billie Joe" (Live, August 3, 1968)	Gentry	4:45
6.	"Mornin' Glory" (Live, July 27, 1968)	Gentry	3:15
7.	"Sunday Best" (Live, July 27, 1968)	Gentry	3:04
8.	"Hurry, Tuesday Child" (Live, July 27, 1968)	Gentry	3:18
9.	"Niki Hoeky" / "Barefootin'" (Live, August 10, 1968)	Jim Ford, Lolly Vegas, Pat Vegas / Robert Parker	3:41
10.	"Penduli Pendulum" (Live, August 10, 1968)	Gentry	2:06
11.	"Ace Insurance Man" (Live, August 10, 1968)	Gentry	3:44
12.	"Chickasaw County Child" (Live, August 10, 1968)	Gentry	1:44
13.	"Recollection" (Live, July 16, 1969)	Gentry	2:14
14.	"Sweete Peony" (Live, July 16, 1969)	Gentry	1:58
15.	"Refractions" (Live, July 16, 1969)	Gentry	2:29
16.	"Greyhound Goin' Somewhere" (Live, July 16, 1969)	Bill Dorsey, Michael Martin Murphey	2:31
17.	"Cotton Candy Sandman" (Live, July 16, 1969)	Kenny Rankin	2:30
18.	"Open Your Window" (Live, February 1, 1971)	Harry Nilsson	1:57
19.	"Mother Nature's Son" (Live, February 1, 1971)	John Lennon, Paul McCartney	3:29
20.	"Mr. Bojangles" (Live, February 1, 1971)	Jerry Jeff Walker	3:28
21.	"Your Number One Fan" (Live, February 1, 1971)	Gentry	5:14
22.	"He Made a Woman Out of Me" (Live, March 8, 1971)	Fred Burch, Don Hill	2:39
23.	"Billy the Kid" (Live, March 8, 1971)	Gentry	2:37
24.	"The Wailing of the Willow" (Live, March 8, 1971)	Nilsson, Ian Freebairn Smith	2:18
25.	"Belinda" (Live, March 8, 1971)	Gentry	3:55
26.	"Circle 'Round the Sun" (Live, March 8, 1971)	Traditional	3:38

- Tracks 1–3, 5, 6, 9–11, 13–16 from Live at the BBC (2018).
- Tracks 4, 7, 8, 12, 17–26 previously unreleased.
- Note: The dates listed with each track on this disc are episode airdates, not recording dates.

== Charts ==
Chart performance for The Girl from Chickasaw County: The Complete Capitol Masters
Chart (2018)	Peak position
UK Country Compilations (OCC)	1
Scottish Albums (OCC)	89

== Release history ==
Country	Date	Format	Label
Worldwide (excluding US)	September 21, 2018	CD, Digital download	Capitol, UMe
United States	September 21, 2018	Digital download	Capitol, UMe
United States	October 12, 2018	CD	Capitol, UMe
