= List of number-one singles of 1969 (Ireland) =

This is a list of singles which topped the Irish Singles Chart in 1969.

Prior to 1992, the Irish singles chart was compiled from trade shipments from the labels to record stores, rather than on consumer sales. Note that the chart release day moved from Saturday to Friday at the beginning of September.

Issue date	Song	Artist	Ref.
4 January	"Lily the Pink"	The Scaffold	
11 January	"Quick Joey Small (Run Joey Run)"	The Real McCoy	
18 January	"Quick Joey Small (Run Joey Run)"	The Real McCoy	
25 January	"Ob-La-Di, Ob-La-Da"	Marmalade	
1 February	"Lonely Woods of Upton"	Sean Dunphy	
8 February	"Lonely Woods of Upton"	Sean Dunphy	
15 February	"Lonely Woods of Upton"	Sean Dunphy	
22 February	"Lonely Woods of Upton"	Sean Dunphy	
1 March	"Lonely Woods of Upton"	Sean Dunphy	
8 March	"Lonely Woods of Upton"	Sean Dunphy	
15 March	"Lonely Woods of Upton"	Sean Dunphy	
22 March	"Lonely Woods of Upton"	Sean Dunphy	
29 March	"The Wages of Love"	Muriel Day	
5 April	"Where Do You Go To (My Lovely)?"	Peter Sarstedt	
12 April	"Where Do You Go To (My Lovely)?"	Peter Sarstedt	
19 April	"Boom Bang-a-Bang"	Lulu	
26 April	"Boom Bang-a-Bang"	Lulu	
3 May	"Goodbye"	Mary Hopkin	
10 May	"Get Back"	The Beatles with Billy Preston	
17 May	"Get Back"	The Beatles with Billy Preston	
24 May	"Get Back"	The Beatles with Billy Preston	
31 May	"Get Back"	The Beatles with Billy Preston	
7 June	"Get Back"	The Beatles with Billy Preston	
14 June	"Get Back"	The Beatles with Billy Preston	
21 June	"The Ballad of John and Yoko"	The Beatles	
28 June	"The Ballad of John and Yoko"	The Beatles	
5 July	"The Ballad of John and Yoko"	The Beatles	
12 July	"The Ballad of John and Yoko"	The Beatles	
19 July	"In the Ghetto"	Elvis Presley	
26 July	"In the Ghetto"	Elvis Presley	
2 August	"In the Ghetto"	Elvis Presley	
9 August	"In the Ghetto"	Elvis Presley	
16 August	"Honky Tonk Women"	The Rolling Stones	
23 August	"Honky Tonk Women"	The Rolling Stones	
30 August	"When the Fields Are White With Daisies"	Sean Dunphy	
5 September	"Saved by the Bell"	Robin Gibb	
12 September	"Saved by the Bell"	Robin Gibb	
19 September	"In the Year 2525"	Zager & Evans	
26 September	"In the Year 2525"	Zager & Evans	
3 October	"Don't Forget to Remember"	The Bee Gees	
10 October	"Bad Moon Rising"	Creedence Clearwater Revival	
17 October	"Don't Forget to Remember"	The Bee Gees	
24 October	"I'll Never Fall in Love Again"	Bobbie Gentry	
31 October	"I'll Never Fall in Love Again"	Bobbie Gentry	
7 November	"Teresa"	Joe Dolan	
14 November	"Sugar, Sugar"	The Archies	
21 November	"Sugar, Sugar"	The Archies	
28 November	"Sugar, Sugar"	The Archies	
5 December	"Sugar, Sugar"	The Archies	
12 December	"Sugar, Sugar"	The Archies	
19 December	"Sugar, Sugar"	The Archies	
26 December	"Two Little Boys"	Rolf Harris	

== See also ==
- 1969 in music
- Irish Singles Chart
- List of artists who reached number one in Ireland
