= Touch 'Em with Love =

Studio album by Bobbie Gentry
- Released: July 7, 1969
- Recorded: April 5–May 1, 1969
- Studio: Columbia Recording Studio (Nashville)
- Genres: Country soul; blue-eyed soul
- Length: 26:45
- Label: Capitol
- Producer: Kelso Herston

Bobbie Gentry chronology
Bobbie Gentry and Glen Campbell (1968)	Touch 'Em with Love (1969)	Fancy (1970)

Singles from Touch ‘Em with Love
- 1. "Touch ‘Em with Love" Released: May 12, 1969; 2. "I’ll Never Fall in Love Again" Released: August 15, 1969

Touch 'Em with Love is the fifth studio album by American singer-songwriter Bobbie Gentry. It was released on July 7, 1969, by Capitol Records. The album was recorded in Nashville, Tennessee, and produced by Kelso Herston.

== Background ==
Following the success of Bobbie Gentry and Glen Campbell, Capitol was keen to continue Gentry's revived popularity with her next record. They felt that a change in direction was needed after the relative failure of both The Delta Sweete and Local Gentry. A more mainstream sound was a given, but there seemed to be some uncertainty about what direction Gentry should go in. A jazz sound was considered at some point, as between February and March 1969 Gentry recorded eight laid-back classic and contemporary jazz tunes. This concept was abandoned before the recordings ever saw the light of day. They are released for the first time on the 2018 boxset The Girl from Chickasaw County: The Complete Capitol Masters. Following this abandoned attempt to record her fourth solo album, Gentry was re-cast as a blue-eyed soul singer. The resulting album was a clear bid by Capitol to distance Gentry from the singer-songwriter country-folk of her first three solo projects. It was also a transition away from self-penned material, the album only contains two Gentry originals. The album was produced by Kelso Herston, head of Capitol Records in Nashville, whose productions were specifically designed for pop radio crossover appeal. The album also saw Gentry working with two new arrangers, Hank Levine and Don Tweedy. The majority of the album was recorded live with no overdubs; the strings and the backing vocals were performed alongside the rhythm section and other instrumentation.

== Recording ==
The album was recorded at Columbia Recording Studio in Nashville. The first session on April 5, 1969, yielded six of the album's ten tracks: "Greyhound Goin' Somewhere", "Seasons Come, Seasons Go", "Glory Hallelujah, How They'll Sing", "Natural to Be Gone", "Touch 'Em with Love", and "I'll Never Fall in Love Again". Gentry recorded "Son of a Preacher Man" and "Where's the Playground, Johnny" on April 29. The remaining two tracks, "I Wouldn’t Be Surprised" and "You've Made Me So Very Happy" where recorded on May 1.

== Critical reception ==
Professional ratings
Review scores
Source	Rating
AllMusic	4.5/5 stars

Billboard gave a positive review, which said, "That "Ode to Billie Joe" gal is back again, trying to regain the winning form that made her one of today's hottest disk attractions. Along with some of her own tunes, Bobbie features Jim Webb's "Where’s the Playground, Johnny", "You’ve Made Me So Very Happy" and "Son of a Preacher Man", as well as the title tune – all drawled in her untamed backwoods twang. Potent comeback material for the backwoods star."

In another positive review, Cashbox said, "Bobbie Gentry's current single, "Touch 'Em with Love", serves as title tune and lead item of a potent pop/country album with some soul thrown in for good measure. The "Billie Joe" girl has put together a strong collection of tunes which should be seeing strong airplay in the months to come with resultant sales high. "Natural to Be Gone", "Where's the Playground, Johnny?", "I'll Never Fall in Love Again" and "You've Made Me So Very Happy" are standouts."

A review from Record World said, "The main sex symbol of the record industry, Bobbie tries out tunes by other writers here. She does things like "Where's the Playground, Johnny?", "Son of a Preacher Man", "I'll Never Fall in Love Again" and "You've Made Me So Very Happy"."

Jason Ankeny of AllMusic have the album four out of five stars. He said the album is "Gentry's finest studio effort" and "a truly great and tragically under-recognized album." He described the album as "a fascinatingly eclectic and genuinely affecting record." He compared the album's "gritty, soulful production" to Dusty Springfield's Dusty in Memphis.

== Commercial performance ==
The album peaked at number 42 on the Billboard Hot Country Albums chart and number 164 on the Billboard Top LP's chart. The album also peaked at number 21 on the UK Albums Chart.

The album's first single, "Touch 'Em with Love", was released in May 1969 and peaked at number 113 on the Billboard Bubbling Under the Hot 100 chart.

The second single, "I'll Never Fall in Love Again", was released in August 1969 in Europe and Australia. It peaked at number 1 on the UK Singles Chart and number 5 in Australia on the Kent Music Report Singles Chart.

== Reissues ==
The album was released on CD for the first time in 1995 exclusively in the UK by the Rev-Ola label.

In 2007, the album was made available for digital download.

Australian label Raven Records released the album on CD in 2008, paired with 1967's Ode to Billie Joe.

The album was included in the 2018 boxset, The Girl from Chickasaw County: The Complete Capitol Masters.

== Track listing ==
Side one
No.	Title	Writer(s)	Recording date	Length
1.	"Touch 'Em with Love"	John Hurley; Ronnie Wilkins	April 5, 1969	2:12
2.	"Greyhound Goin' Somewhere"	Bill Dorsey; Michael Martin Murphey	April 5, 1969	2:30
3.	"Natural to Be Gone"	John Hartford	April 5, 1969	2:25
4.	"Seasons Come, Seasons Go"	Bobbie Gentry	April 5, 1969	2:47
5.	"Glory Hallelujah, How They'll Sing"	Gentry	April 5, 1969	2:40

Side two
No.	Title	Writer(s)	Recording date	Length
1.	"I Wouldn't Be Surprised"	Larry Henley; Marc Mathis	May 1, 1969	3:30
2.	"Son of a Preacher Man"	Hurley; Wilkins	April 29, 1969	2:05
3.	"Where's the Playground, Johnny"	Jimmy Webb	April 29, 1969	2:32
4.	"I'll Never Fall in Love Again"	Burt Bacharach; Hal David	April 5, 1969	3:00
5.	"You've Made Me So Very Happy"	Berry Gordy, Jr.; Frank Wilson; Patrice Holloway; Brenda Holloway	May 1, 1969	3:25

== Personnel ==
Adapted from the album liner notes.

- Bobbie Gentry – vocals
- Kelso Herston – producer
- Hank Levine – arrangements
- Don Tweedy – arrangements

== Charts ==
Album

Chart (1969)	Peak position
UK Albums (OCC)	21
US Hot Country Albums (Billboard)	42
US Top LP's (Billboard)	164

Singles

Title	Year	Peak chart positions								
Title	Year	US Bubbling	AU	BE	DE	IE	NO	NZ	SA	UK
"Touch 'Em with Love"	1969	113	—	—	—	—	—	—	—	—
"I'll Never Fall in Love Again"	1969	—	5	tip	27	1	5	5	3	1
