= Live at the BBC (Bobbie Gentry album) =

Live album by Bobbie Gentry
- Released: April 21, 2018
- Recorded: 1968–1969
- Studio: BBC Television Centre (White City, London)
- Genre: Country
- Length: 36:07
- Label: Capitol, Universal
- Producer: Stanley Dorfman · Bobbie Gentry

Bobbie Gentry chronology
Patchwork (1971)	Live at the BBC (2018)	The Girl from Chickasaw County: The Complete Capitol Masters (2018)

Live at the BBC is a live album by American singer-songwriter Bobbie Gentry. It was released on April 21, 2018, by Capitol Records and Universal Music Catalogue for Record Store Day 2018. The album features recordings from the first two seasons of Gentry's BBC television series, Bobbie Gentry.

As a Record Store Day exclusive, the album was limited to 1,200 copies. In Europe the LP featured a download code for a digital copy of the album.

The tracks featured on this album are included on the 2018 compilation, The Girl from Chickasaw County: The Complete Capitol Masters, along with 14 additional recordings from all three seasons of the television series.

== Track listing ==
All tracks are written by Bobbie Gentry, except where noted.

Side one
No.	Title	Episode	Length
1.	"Mississippi Delta"	Series 1, Episode 4 (aired August 3, 1968)	3:04
2.	"Papa, Won't You Let Me Go to Town with You?"	Series 1, Episode 4 (aired August 3, 1968)	2:52
3.	"I Saw an Angel Die"	Series 1, Episode 4 (aired August 3, 1968)	2:30
4.	"Ode to Billie Joe"	Series 1, Episode 4 (aired August 3, 1968)	4:48
5.	"Mornin' Glory"	Series 1, Episode 3 (aired July 27, 1968)	3:15
6.	"Ace Insurance Man"	Series 1, Episode 5 (aired August 10, 1968)	3:44

Side two
No.	Title	Episode	Length
1.	"Niki Hoeky" / "Barefootin'" (Jim Ford, Lolly Vegas, Pat Vegas, Robert Parker)	Series 1, Episode 5 (aired August 10, 1968)	3:42
2.	"Penduli Pendulum"	Series 1, Episode 5 (aired August 10, 1968)	2:05
3.	"Recollection"	Series 2, Episode 5 (aired July 16, 1969)	2:14
4.	"Sweet Peony"	Series 2, Episode 5 (aired July 16, 1969)	1:58
5.	"Refractions"	Series 2, Episode 5 (aired July 16, 1969)	2:29
6.	"Greyhound Goin' Somewhere" (Bill Dorsey, Michael Martin Murphey)	Series 2, Episode 5 (aired July 16, 1969)	2:30

== Personnel ==
Adapted from the album liner notes.

- Andrew Batt – compiler, sleeve notes
- John Cameron – music director, piano
- Tony Carr – drums, percussion
- Stanley Dorfman – director, producer
- Herbie Flowers – bass
- Bobbie Gentry – lead vocals, acoustic guitar, piano
- Tony Lyons – artwork
- Colin Green – electric guitar
- Pat Halling – strings conductor
- Kris Maher – product manager
- Harold McNair – flute, saxophone
- Alan Parker – electric guitar
- Tears of Joy – backing vocals
- Danny Thompson – bass

== Charts ==
Chart performance for Live at the BBC
Chart (2018)	Peak position
UK Country Compilations (OCC)	3
