= Fancy (Bobbie Gentry album) =

Studio album by Bobbie Gentry
- Released: April 6, 1970
- Recorded: April 5, 1969–January 29, 1970
- Studio: Fame Recording Studios (Muscle Shoals); Capitol Recording Studios (Hollywood)
- Genre: Southern soul, country pop
- Length: 30:02
- Label: Capitol
- Producer: Rick Hall, Bobbie Gentry

Bobbie Gentry chronology
Touch 'Em with Love (1969)	Fancy (1970)	Patchwork (1971)

I'll Never Fall in Love Again
- Cover art of the UK release.

Singles from Fancy
- 1. "Fancy" Released: November 3, 1969; 2. "Raindrops Keep Fallin' on My Head" Released: February 6, 1970; 3. "He Made a Woman Out of Me" Released: March 30, 1970; 4. "If You Gotta Make a Fool of Somebody" Released: April 24, 1970

Fancy is the sixth studio album by American singer-songwriter Bobbie Gentry. It was released on April 6, 1970, by Capitol Records. The album was produced by Rick Hall and recorded at his FAME Recording Studios, apart from Wedding Bell Blues and Raindrops Keep Falling On My Head which were produced by Gentry herself, and recorded at Capitol Studios in Hollywood, California. The cover art for the album is an uncredited painting of Gentry, based upon a reference photograph. According to the liner notes for the 2004 compilation Chickasaw County Child: The Artistry of Bobbie Gentry, the painting is believed to have been done by Gentry herself.

In the UK the album was released under the title I’ll Never Fall in Love Again. This release featured a different track order and cover art, plus two additional tracks, "In the Ghetto" and "Billy the Kid", the latter would also appear on 1971’s Patchwork.

In 2007, Australian label Raven Records released the album on CD for the first time, paired with 1971’s Patchwork. The album was also made available for digital download the same year.

Professional ratings
Review scores
Source	Rating
Allmusic	link
Rolling Stone	link

== Critical reception ==
The April 18, 1970, issue of Billboard featured a review which said, "This is not merely a followup LP to a successful single; Miss Gentry's folksy story-telling vocals include some outstanding material. Opening with her hit single, "Fancy", she further impresses with her Hot 100 single, "He Made a Woman Out of Me", her No. 1 English hit of "I'll Never Fall in Love Again", and Leon Russell's "Delta Man". LP should top the single's acceptance."

Cashbox published a review the same day, saying, "It seemed for a long time that Bobbie Gentry would remain forever in the shadow of "Ode to Billie Joe", the record that launched her to fame and that she failed to follow up with anything as artistically powerful or commercially successful. Her duets with Glen Campbell kept her in the limelight, and finally she had another hit single – the title song of this album – on her own. The LP is of good quality and should make the charts, and Miss Gentry should continue to prove that she is not a one-song artist."

The review from Record World said, "Sexy is as sexy does and Bobbie Gentry certainly does. She's taken the sensual seductiveness of her own "Fancy" and made that the criterion for this new album. Standouts: "Delta Man", Something in the Way He Moves" (James Taylor's song that inspired George Harrison's "Something")."

The album earned Gentry a Grammy nomination for "Best Contemporary Pop Vocal Performance, Female".

== Commercial performance ==
The album peaked at No. 37 on the US Billboard Top Country Albums chart and No. 96 on the US Billboard Top LP's chart. In Canada the album peaked at No. 79 on the RPM Top Albums chart.

The album's first single, "Fancy", was released in November 1969. It peaked at No. 8 on the US Billboard Top 40 Easy Listening chart, No. 26 on the US Billboard Hot Country Singles chart, and No. 31 on the US Billboard Hot 100 chart. In Canada the single peaked at No. 1 on the RPM Top County Singles chart, No. 20 on the RPM Top Easy Listening Singles chart, and No. 26 on the RPM Top Singles chart. In Australia "Fancy" peaked at No. 70 on the Kent Music Report Top Singles chart.

In February 1970, "Raindrops Keep Fallin' on My Head", was released in the UK as the album's first single, second overall. It reached a peak position of No. 40 on the OCC UK Singles Chart.

"He Made a Woman Out of Me" was released in March 1970 as the second single, third overall. It peaked at No. 71 on the US Billboard Hot 100 chart. In Canada it peaked at No. 57 on the RPM Top Singles chart.

In April 1970, "If You Gotta Make a Fool of Somebody" was released as the album's second UK single, fourth overall. It failed to chart.

"Fancy" was released as the third UK single in October 1970 and failed to chart.

== Track listing ==
Side one
No.	Title	Writer(s)	Recording date	Length
1.	"Fancy"	Bobbie Gentry	August 8, 1969	4:15
2.	"I'll Never Fall in Love Again"	Burt Bacharach, Hal David	April 5, 1969	3:00
3.	"Delta Man"	Leon Russell	January 12, 1970	3:03
4.	"Something in the Way He Moves"	James Taylor	August 1, 1969	2:34
5.	"Find 'Em, Fool 'Em and Forget 'Em"	George Jackson, Rick Hall	January 12, 1970	2:37

Side two
No.	Title	Writer(s)	Recording date	Length
1.	"He Made a Woman Out of Me"	Fred Burch, Don Hill	January 12, 1970	2:34
2.	"Raindrops Keep Fallin' on My Head"	Bacharach, David	January 8, 1970	3:07
3.	"If You Gotta Make a Fool of Somebody"	Rudy Clark	August 8, 1969	2:34
4.	"Rainmaker"	Harry Nilsson, Bill Martin	January 12, 1970	2:35
5.	"Wedding Bell Blues"	Laura Nyro	January 12, 1970	3:15

UK release (I'll Never Fall in Love Again)

Side one
No.	Title	Writer(s)	Length
1.	"I'll Never Fall in Love Again"	Burt Bacharach, Hal David	3:00
2.	"Something in the Way He Moves"	James Taylor	2:34
3.	"Rainmaker"	Harry Nilsson, Bill Martin	2:35
4.	"Billy the Kid"	Bobbie Gentry	2:40
5.	"Wedding Bell Blues"	Laura Nyro	3:15
6.	"Raindrops Keep Fallin'on My Head"	Bacharach, David	3:07

Side two
No.	Title	Writer(s)	Length
1.	"Fancy"	Gentry	4:15
2.	"In the Ghetto"	Mac Davis	2:49
3.	"Find 'Em, Fool 'Em and Forget 'Em"	George Jackson, Rick Hall	2:37
4.	"Delta Man"	Leon Russell	3:03
5.	"He Made a Woman Out of Me"	Fred Burch, Don Hill	2:34
6.	"If You Gotta Make a Fool of Somebody"	Rudy Clark	2:34

== Personnel ==
Adapted from the album liner notes.

- Bobbie Gentry - vocals, producer
- Rick Hall - producer
- Jimmie Haskell - string arrangements
- Don Lee Keith - liner notes
- Tommy Oliver - arrangements

== Chart positions ==
Album

Year	Chart	Chart position
1970	Canada Top Albums (RPM)	79
1970	US Hot Country Albums (Billboard)	34
1970	US Top LP's (Billboard)	96

Singles

Year	Single	Chart	Chart position
1969	"Fancy"	Australia (Kent Music Report)	70
1969	"Fancy"	Canada Top Country Singles (RPM)	1
1969	"Fancy"	Canada Top Easy Listening Singles (RPM)	20
1969	"Fancy"	Canada Top Singles (RPM)	26
1969	"Fancy"	US Top 40 Easy Listening (Billboard)	8
1969	"Fancy"	US Hot Country Singles (Billboard)	26
1969	"Fancy"	US Hot 100 (Billboard)	31
1970	"Raindrops Keep Fallin' on My Head"	UK Singles Chart (OCC)	40
1970	"He Made a Woman Out of Me"	Canada Top Singles (RPM)	57
1970	"He Made a Woman Out of Me"	US Hot 100 (Billboard)	71

== Accolades ==
13th Annual Grammy Awards

Year	Nominee / work	Award	Result
1971	Fancy	Best Contemporary Vocal Performance, Female	Nominated
