= Kelly Gordon =

American musician (1932–1981)

Kelly Gordon (November 19, 1932 – August 1, 1981) was an American singer, songwriter and record producer. His input on Bobbie Gentry's "Ode to Billie Joe" catapulted the song to fame and led to a collaboration and lasting friendship. He also co‑wrote the hit song "That's Life" with Dean Kay.

== Work ==
After recording some unsuccessful solo singles for Mercury Records, Gordon was employed by Capitol Records as a staff producer. One of his first productions was Bobbie Gentry's "Ode to Billie Joe", where he took her demo of the song and overdubbed a string arrangement by Jimmie Haskell. The song was an immediate hit, with nine Grammy Awards nominations in 1968 and three wins. Rolling Stone eventually put it at position 419 of its "500 Greatest Songs of All Time" listing.

Gordon and Gentry became close friends and collaborators on her music. With considerable input from Gentry, Gordon produced the albums Ode to Billie Joe (1967), The Delta Sweete (1968), and Local Gentry (1968) and co-produced Bobbie Gentry and Glen Campbell (with Glen Campbell) (1968) with Campbell's then-producer, Al De Lory.

His success with Gentry led to Gordon being given the chance to record his own album for Capitol. "Defunked" was released in 1969. It included the song "That's Life", which he co-wrote with Dean Kay; that garnered numerous cover versions, including one by Frank Sinatra. Some of his compositions from that time went to well-known performers such as The Temptations, Nichelle Nichols, Aretha Franklin, and James Brown.

Bobbie Gentry made an uncredited appearance on "Defunked", duetting on the song "Love Took My Heart and Mashed That Sucker Flat". The album also included the first recording of Bobby Scott and Bobby Russell's "He Ain't Heavy, He's My Brother", a worldwide hit for the Hollies in 1969. Gordon's bravura performance of the song was released as a single the same year but failed to chart.

In 1963, Gordon appeared as the rock-and-roll idol-turned-victim in the Burke's Law episode "Who Killed Billy Jo?"

== Personal life ==
Gordon was already divorced before he moved into Gentry's guest house after falling ill with prostate cancer. Gentry allowed one of Gordon's sisters to stay there as well. They both cared for him until he died in 1981.

== Awards ==
Grammy Awards 1968 for "Ode to Billie Joe" for which Gordon took part as the producer:

- Award:
  - Best Arrangement Accompanying Vocalist(S) Or Instrumentalist(S): Bobbie Gentry
  - Female Contemporary Vocal Solo: Bobbie Gentry
  - Female Vocal Performance: Bobbie Gentry
- Nomination:
  - Album Of The Year
  - Best Engineered Recording
  - Contemporary Album
  - Contemporary Single
  - Record Of The Year
  - Song Of The Year

== Discography ==
=== Albums ===
Kelly Gordon: "DEFUNKED" (subtitle: big blues party), Capitiol Records, vinyl LP (1969)
Side 1:

- Teeny Boppin' Child - 3:55 - Kelly Gordon, Lee Majors (ASCAP)
- Games People Play - 3:35 - Joe South (BMI)
- Independently Poor - 2:42 - Kelly Gordon, Mike McKinley (BMI)
- He Ain't Heavy, He's My Brother - 4:50 - Bob Russell, Bobby Scott (ASCAP)

Side 2:

- Some Old Funky Blues Thang - 3:28 - Kelly Gordon (ASCAP)
- Ain't That The Truth Ruth - 1:54 - Kelly Gordon (ASCAP)
- Picadilly Willie - 3:20 - Kelly Gordon, Shorty Rogers (ASCAP)
- Love Took My Heart And Mashed That Sucker Flat - 2:11 - Kelly Gordon (BMI)
- If That Don't Get It, It Ain't There (Instrumental) - 2:35 - Kelly Gordon, Shorty Rogers (ASCAP)
- That's Life - 3:07 - Kelly Gordon, Dean Kay (BMI)

Kelly Gordon on CD (resembles "DEFUNKED" LP track list, date unknown)

1. Teeny Boppin' Child
2. Games People Play
3. Independently Poor
4. He Ain't Heavy, He's My Brother
5. Some Old Funky Blues Thang
6. Ain't That The Truth Ruth
7. Picadilly Willie
8. Love Took My Heart And Mashed That Sucker Flat
9. If That Don't Get It, It Ain't There (Instrumental)
10. That's Life

=== Singles and EPs ===
Kelly Gordon: (Mercury Record Corporation. 1963)

A: Let Me Tell Ya Jack - 2:18 - Kelly Gordon, Arranged by: Shorty Rogers, Vocal produced by: Herschel Gilbert, Four Star Television Music (BMI), vinyl for broadcast only

B: Tears, Tears - 2:10 - by Ray Johnson, sung by Kelly Gordon in Four Star TV "Burke's Law" (1963), Arranged by: Shorty Rogers - BNP Music Pub. (ASCAP), vinyl for broadcast only

Kelly Gordon: (Mercury, 1963)

A: A Phonograph Record - 1:58 - Kelly Gordon, Arranged by: Dave Gates, Vocal produced by: Jack Tracy, Four Star Television Music (BMI), vinyl for broadcast only

B: I'll Never Be Free - 2:46 - Benny Benjamin, George David Weiss, Arranged by: Gerald Wilson, Vocal produced by: Jack Tracy, Laurel Music Corp. (ASCAP), vinyl for broadcast only

Kelly Gordon: (Mercury, 1964, two versions, first one without the second track)

A: You're A Star Now - 2:15 - Joy Byers, Arranged by: Tommy Oliver, Vocal produced by: Jack Tracy, Hill & Range Songs (BMI), vinyl for broadcast only

B: Take A Letter Miss Jones - 2:15 - Gene Ecceles, Don McGinnis, Arranged by: Tommy Oliver, Vocal produced by: Jack Tracy, Four Star Television Music (BMI), vinyl for broadcast only

Kelly Gordon: (Capitol Records, 1969 US; French edition had sides swapped)

A: Independently Poor - 2:42 - Kelly Gordon, Mike McKinley, Arranged by: Shorty Rogers, Produced by: Kelly Gordon - Capitol, Chappell

B: Some Old Funky Blues Thang - 3:28 - Kelly Gordon, Arranged by: Shorty Rogers, Produced by: Kelly Gordon - Capitol, ASCAP

Kelly Gordon: (Capitol Records, 1969-1970. US and Europe)

A: He Ain't Heavy... He's My Brother - 4:49 - Bob Russell, Bobby Scott, Arranged by: Tommy Oliver, Produced by: Kelly Gordon - Capitol, B.I.E.M.

B: That's Life - 3:07 - Kelly Gordon, Dean Kay, Arranged by: Shorty Rogers, Produced by: Kelly Gordon - Capitol, Chappell
