= Patchwork (Bobbie Gentry album) =

Studio album by Bobbie Gentry
- Released: April 26, 1971
- Recorded: c. November 1969–c. March 1971
- Studio: Hollywood Sound Studios (Hollywood)
- Genre: Country, soul
- Length: 47:18
- Label: Capitol
- Producer: Bobbie Gentry

Bobbie Gentry chronology
| Fancy (1970) | Patchwork (1971) | Live at the BBC (2018) |

Singles from Patchwork
- 1. "But I Can’t Get Back" Released: March 29, 1971; 2. "Somebody Like Me" Released: May 21, 1971

Patchwork is the seventh and final studio album by American singer-songwriter Bobbie Gentry, issued by Capitol Records on April 26, 1971. Gentry completely retired from the music industry after making a final television appearance in 1981, ten years after the album's release; although she did record another album in the late 1970s, it was not released.

In 2007, Australian label Raven Records released the album on CD for the first time, paired with 1970's Fancy. The album was also made available for digital download the same year.

The cover art for the album is an uncredited painting of Gentry. According to the liner notes for the 2004 compilation Chickasaw County Child: The Artistry of Bobbie Gentry, the painting is believed to have been done by Gentry herself.

== Critical reception ==
Professional ratings
Review scores
| Source | Rating |
|---|---|
| Allmusic | link |

Despite being a commercial failure, the album received positive reviews from music critics. Billboard called the album "simply charming," saying that "there is a strong hint of autobiography and disarming re-creations of recent times gone by." The review went on to say that "But I Can't Get Back", "Marigolds and Tangerines", "Miss Clara / Azusa Sue", "Beverly", and "Lookin' In" are stand out tracks. Cashbox gave a glowing review, saying that the album should make "those who have been taking Bobbie Gentry lightly...stop and reconsider." They went on to say the album is "a masterpiece," describing it as "a finely woven collection of tunes written and produced by Bobbie. It is a perfect album in every respect." The review concludes by saying that the album "stands a good chance of winning album of the year awards." Record World called the album "another newsletter from bayou country." The review said that Gentry "might be closer to Faulkner than she is to Irving Berlin. She sings about the people she's known and loved." The review concludes by comparing the album to "leafing through a good book or someone's family album," calling it "warm and quilty like a patchwork."

Richie Unterberger, writing decades later for AllMusic, gave the album three and a half out of five stars. He felt that "none of these songs really rank among her very best (or certainly her earthiest), and it's more something to be enjoyed by committed fans than recommended as the first or second stop for someone who wants more than a best-of collection. Still, some of the charms particular to Gentry—her husky voice, and her fusion of country, folk, and pop—remain in force, the most serious and intimate portraits ("Beverly", "Belinda", "Lookin' In", and "Marigolds and Tangerines") being the most impressive."

== Commercial performance ==
The album peaked at No. 221 on the US Billboard Bubbling Under the Top LP's chart.

The album's first single, "But I Can't Get Back", was released in March 1971. It peaked at No. 37 on the US Billboard Easy Listening chart and No. 93 on the Canadian RPM Top Singles chart.

In May 1971, "Somebody Like Me" was released as a single in the UK and did not chart.

== Track listing ==
All songs written by Bobbie Gentry, except as noted.

Side one
| No. | Title | Recording date | Length |
|---|---|---|---|
| 1. | "Benjamin" / "Interlude 1" | May 19, 1970 | 4:19 |
| 2. | "Marigolds and Tangerines" / "Interlude 2" | c. March 1971 | 2:42 |
| 3. | "Billy the Kid" / "Interlude 3" | February 1970 | 2:40 |
| 4. | "Beverly" / "Interlude 4" | c. March 1971 | 3:46 |
| 5. | "Miss Clara / Azusa Sue" / "Interlude 5" | c. March 1971 | 4:41 |
| 6. | "But I Can't Get Back" (Bobbie Gentry, Kelly Gordon) | c. March 1971 | 3:31 |

Side two
| No. | Title | Recording date | Length |
|---|---|---|---|
| 1. | "Jeremiah" / "Interlude 6" | c. March 1971 | 6:12 |
| 2. | "Belinda" | May 19, 1970 | 3:59 |
| 3. | "Mean Stepmama Blues" | c. March 1971 | 3:57 |
| 4. | "Your Number One Fan" / "Interlude 7" | c. November 1969 | 2:53 |
| 5. | "Somebody Like Me" | c. March 1971 | 3:25 |
| 6. | "Lookin' In" | c. March 1971 | 4:39 |

== Personnel ==
Adapted from the album liner notes and back cover.

- Bobbie Gentry - vocals, producer
- George Tipton - arrangements (Belinda & Your Number One Fan)
- Jerry Toth - arrangement (Billy the Kid)
- John Cameron - arrangement (Miss Clara/Azusa Sue)
- Larry Muhoberac - all other arrangements (including interludes)
- John Guess - engineer

== Chart positions ==
Album

| Year | Chart | Chart position |
|---|---|---|
| 1971 | US Bubbling Under the Top LP's (Billboard) | 221 |

Singles

| Year | Single | Chart | Chart position |
|---|---|---|---|
| 1971 | "But I Can't Get Back" | Canada Top Singles (RPM) | 93 |
| 1971 | "But I Can't Get Back" | US Top 40 Easy Listening (Billboard) | 37 |
