= I'll Never Fall in Love Again =

1969 single by Bacharach & David

- Sheet music cover

Song
- Released: 1968
- Genre: Pop
- Composer: Burt Bacharach
- Lyricist: Hal David

"I'll Never Fall in Love Again" is a popular song by composer Burt Bacharach and lyricist Hal David that was written for the 1968 musical Promises, Promises. Several recordings of the song were released in 1969; the most popular versions were by Dionne Warwick, who took it to number 6 on Billboard magazine's Hot 100 and spent three weeks topping the magazine's list of the most popular Easy Listening songs, and Bobbie Gentry, who peaked at number 1 in Ireland and the UK and made the top 5 in other countries.

== Writing ==
In the fall of 1968, Bacharach and David were in Boston for previews of Promises, Promises, the new musical for which producer David Merrick had asked if they would write the score, and Merrick realized, "We're missing a song in the middle of the second act, and what we need is something the audience can whistle on their way out of the theater." But around this time, Bacharach was hospitalized with pneumonia and was unable to sit at a piano to write the music until after he was released. By that time "Hal had already come up with the lyrics to 'I'll Never Fall in Love Again,' and my hospital stay had inspired him to write, 'What do you get when you kiss a girl? / You get enough germs to catch pneumonia / After you do, she'll never phone you.'" When he finally sat with the lyrics in front of him, he recalls, "I wrote the melody for 'I'll Never Fall in Love Again' faster than I had ever written any song in my life." The surge of creativity paid off. "We came in with the song the next morning, and it went into the show a couple of nights later. 'I'll Never Fall in Love Again' became the outstanding hit from the score and pretty much stopped the show every night."

== First performance and recording ==
Promises, Promises had its Broadway premiere on December 1, 1968, and the song was originally performed as a duet between the characters played by Jill O'Hara and Jerry Orbach as they ruminate on the various troubles that falling in love brings. They recorded it for the original Broadway cast album.

== Grammy nomination ==
At the 12th Annual Grammy Awards on March 11, 1970, Bacharach and David were the songwriting nominees for "I'll Never Fall in Love Again" in the Song of the Year category but lost to Joe South for "Games People Play".

== Johnny Mathis version ==
"I'll Never Fall in Love Again"

Single by Johnny Mathis

from the album Love Theme from "Romeo And Juliet" (A Time for Us)
- B-side: "Whoever You Are, I Love You"
- Released: April 8, 1969
- Recorded: January 18, 1969
- Genre: Pop
- Length: 3:02
- Label: Columbia
- Songwriters: Burt Bacharach; Hal David
- Producer: Robert Mersey

Johnny Mathis singles chronology
"The 59th Street Bridge Song (Feelin' Groovy)" (1969)	"I'll Never Fall in Love Again" (1969)	"Love Theme from Romeo and Juliet" (1969)

Official audio
- "I'll Never Fall in Love Again" on YouTube

Johnny Mathis recorded "I'll Never Fall in Love Again" on January 18, 1969, with an arrangement by Robert Mersey, who also produced the recording. It was released as a single three months later, on April 8. It was also included on his next album, Love Theme from "Romeo And Juliet" (A Time for Us), which was released three months after the single, on July 30.

=== Chart performance ===
The Mathis recording of "I'll Never Fall in Love Again" was the first to reach any of the charts in Billboard when it debuted on the magazine's Easy Listening chart in the issue dated May 17, 1969. It reached number 35 over the course of three weeks there. It peaked at number 32 on the Easy Listening chart in Record World magazine and number 32 on their Singles Coming Up chart, which listed songs that had not yet reached their list of the 100 most popular hit records.

=== Critical reception ===
The editors of Billboard wrote, "The infectious rhythm ballad … is loaded with commercial appeal in this top Mathis reading." The editors of Cash Box magazine wrote, "One of Mathis's most delightful performances in quite some time, with a younger lilt and the charm of a sparkling song" that had an "especially captivating lyric and sweet arrangement". The editors of Record World magazine wrote, "This is a beautiful Bacharach-David melodic ballad, and Johnny Mathis's vocal is just right."

=== Charts ===
Weekly chart performance for "I'll Never Fall in Love Again" by Johnny Mathis
Chart (1969)	Peak position
US Billboard Easy Listening	35
US Record World Easy Listening	32
US Record World Singles Coming Up	32

== Burt Bacharach version ==
"I'll Never Fall in Love Again"

Single by Burt Bacharach

from the album Make It Easy on Yourself
- B-side: "Pacific Coast Highway"
- Released: 1969
- Recorded: 1969
- Genre: Pop
- Length: 3:13
- Label: A&M
- Songwriters: Burt Bacharach; Hal David
- Producers: Burt Bacharach; Phil Ramone

Burt Bacharach singles chronology
"Reach Out for Me" (1967)	"I'll Never Fall in Love Again" (1969)	"All Kinds of People" (1971)

Official audio
- "I'll Never Fall in Love Again" on YouTube

Bacharach's own version, which was sung by a female chorus, was recorded for his 1969 album Make It Easy on Yourself. He produced the recording with Phil Ramone and acted as arranger and conductor.

=== Chart performance ===
On Billboard's Easy Listening chart, the Bacharach recording overtook the Mathis release after a May 31 debut and got as high as number 18 during its nine-week stay. It also peaked at number 93 on the Hot 100 during the two weeks it spent there in July. It reached number 17 on the Easy Listening chart in Record World magazine.

=== Critical reception ===
The editors of Billboard called the recording "unique". The editors of Cash Box described it as a "splendid reading". The editors of Record World listed the recording as one of their Four Star Picks.

=== Charts ===
Weekly chart performance for "I'll Never Fall in Love Again" by Burt Bacharach
Chart (1969)	Peak position
US Billboard Easy Listening	18
US Billboard Hot 100	93
US Record World Easy Listening	17

== Bobbie Gentry version ==
"I'll Never Fall in Love Again"

Single by Bobbie Gentry

from the album Touch 'Em with Love
- B-side: "Ace Insurance Man"
- Released: 1969
- Recorded: 1969
- Genre: Pop
- Length: 2:50
- Label: Capitol
- Songwriters: Burt Bacharach; Hal David
- Producer: Kelso Herston

Bobbie Gentry singles chronology
"Touch 'Em with Love" (1969)	"I'll Never Fall in Love Again" (1969)	"Fancy" (1969)

Official audio
- "I'll Never Fall in Love Again" on YouTube

Bobbie Gentry recorded "I'll Never Fall in Love Again" for her 1969 album Touch 'Em with Love, which was produced by Kelso Herston.

=== Chart performance ===
The Gentry recording entered the UK singles chart on August 30, 1969, and spent one of its 19 weeks there at number one. It also peaked at number one in Ireland, number three in South Africa, and number five in Australia, New Zealand and Norway.

=== Critical reception ===
In a review of Touch 'Em with Love, the editors of Cash Box described Gentry's recording as a "standout". In reviewing Gentry's version alongside that of Anita Harris, Derek Johnson of New Musical Express wrote of the song,

Certainly it has a pleasantly lifting rhythm and a hummable tune, and it enables the singer to project her personality and song-singing ability to the utmost advantage. Surprisingly, Bobbie Gentry's version has a heavy thump beat and a brash attacking scoring—and this, coupled with her delicious husky tones and cute Chickasaw accent, could possibly give her the commercial edge.

=== Charts ===
Weekly chart performance for "I'll Never Fall in Love Again" by Bobbie Gentry
Chart (1969–70)	Peak position
Australia (Kent Music Report)	5
Ireland (IRMA)	1
New Zealand (Listener)	5
Norway (VG-lista)	5
South Africa (Springbok)	3
UK Singles	1

Year-end chart performance
Chart (1970)	Rank
Australia	82
UK	10

== Dionne Warwick version ==
"I'll Never Fall in Love Again"

Single by Dionne Warwick

from the album I'll Never Fall in Love Again
- B-side: "What the World Needs Now Is Love"
- Released: December 1969
- Recorded: 1969
- Genre: Pop
- Length: 2:52
- Label: Scepter
- Songwriters: Burt Bacharach; Hal David
- Producers: Burt Bacharach; Hal David

Dionne Warwick singles chronology
"You've Lost That Lovin' Feeling" (1969)	"I'll Never Fall in Love Again" (1969)	"Let Me Go to Him" (1970)

Official audio
- "I'll Never Fall in Love Again" on YouTube

Dionne Warwick recorded the song for her album of the same name, which was produced by Bacharach and David. Bacharach arranged the music with Larry Wilcox.

=== Chart performance ===
The Warwick recording made its first appearance on the Billboard Hot 100 in the issue dated December 27, 1969, to start an 11-week run that took it to number 6. It reached number 6 on the Cash Box Top 100 and number 7 on the 100 Top Pops chart in Record World magazine, where it went to number 1 on the Easy Listening chart. The January 3, 1970, issue of Billboard marked its first of 11 weeks on that magazine's Easy Listening chart, where it spent three weeks at number 1, and a seven-week stay on their list of the 50 Best Selling Soul Singles in the US began in the next issue and included a peak position at number 17. Her version also spent four weeks at number 1 on the Canadian Adult Contemporary chart and reached number 3 on the Canadian pop chart.

=== Critical reception ===
The editors of Billboard wrote that Warwick gave the song "just the right treatment". The editors of Cash Box magazine described it as a "scintillating reading". The editors of Record World magazine wrote that the song received "the definitive treatment from Dionne Warwick, who always sounds good".

=== Charts ===
Weekly chart performance for "I'll Never Fall in Love Again" by Dionne Warwick
Chart (1969–1970)	Peak position
Canada RPM Top Singles	3
Canada RPM Easy Listening	1
US Billboard Hot 100	6
US Billboard Easy Listening	1
US Billboard R&B	17
US Cash Box Top 100	6
US Record World Easy Listening	15
US Record World 100 Top Pops	7

Year-end chart performance
Chart (1970)	Rank
Canada	52
US Billboard Hot 100	95
US Cash Box	63

== Liz Anderson version ==
"I'll Never Fall in Love Again"

Single by Liz Anderson
- B-side: "You Buy the Wine"
- Released: 1972
- Genre: Country
- Length: 2:32
- Label: Epic
- Songwriters: Burt Bacharach; Hal David
- Producer: Glenn Sutton

Liz Anderson singles chronology
"It Don't Do No Good to Be a Good Girl" (1971)	"I'll Never Fall in Love Again" (1972)	"Astrology" (1972)

In 1972, Liz Anderson recorded the song as a single that was produced by Glenn Sutton.

=== Chart performance ===
Anderson's recording debuted on Billboard's Hot Country Singles chart in the April 8, 1972, issue and peaked at number 56 over the course of seven weeks. It reached number 54 on the Cash Box Country Top 75 and number 61 on the Country Singles Chart in Record World.

=== Critical reception ===
The editors of Cash Box magazine wrote, "Liz Anderson could come back strong with her version of the Burt Bacharach-Hal David pop tune popularized by Dionne Warwick. Lynn Anderson's mom could give her daughter a run for her money in the hits department."

=== Charts ===
Weekly chart performance for "I'll Never Fall in Love Again" by Liz Anderson
Chart (1972)	Peak position
US Billboard Hot Country Songs	56
US Cash Box Country Top 75	54
US Record World Country Singles Chart	61

== Deacon Blue version ==
"I'll Never Fall in Love Again"

Single by Deacon Blue

from the EP Four Bacharach & David Songs
- Released: 1990
- Genre: Pop
- Length: 2:32
- Label: CBS
- Songwriters: Burt Bacharach; Hal David
- Producer: Jon Kelly

Deacon Blue singles chronology
"Queen of the New Year" (1989)	"I'll Never Fall in Love Again" (1990)	"Your Swaying Arms" (1991)

Official audio
- "I'll Never Fall in Love Again" on YouTube

In 1990 the Scottish pop rock band Deacon Blue opted for a slower arrangement on the duet between their vocalists Ricky Ross and Lorraine McIntosh as part of the four-song EP Four Bacharach & David Songs. It was produced by Jon Kelly.

=== Chart performance ===
The song was the main radio choice for the EP, which reached number two in the UK and became Deacon Blue's biggest hit in the UK. (The EP was listed as the single rather than the song on the UK chart). The song also reached number 2 in Ireland, and number 72 in the Netherlands.

=== Charts ===
Weekly chart performance for "I'll Never Fall in Love Again" by Deacon Blue
Chart (1990)	Peak position
Ireland (IRMA)	2
Netherlands (Single Top 100)	72

== Cover versions ==
=== Billboard reviews ===
Various versions of "I'll Never Fall in Love Again" have been praised by the editors of Billboard in reviews of the albums or singles on which they appear. Ella Fitzgerald gave the song "a strong going-over" for her rendition, which was released as a single in 1969. Four releases from 1970 included noteworthy recordings. The editors described the one on Mark Lindsay's album Arizona as "a sensitive reading". On Patti Page's Honey Come Back, they wrote, "She floats with ease through" the song. Regarding Green Is Beautiful, they wrote, "Blue Note veteran Grant Green moves back among the leaders in jazz guitar with this bluesy, swinging workout that finds Green up front and in control of 'I'll Never Fall in Love Again'." In their review of the single by Joe Tex, they wrote that he gave "his own special touch" to the song "with his clever new lyric interpretation".

=== Cash Box reviews ===
Cash Box magazine editors highlighted two 1969 singles, one a "lighthearted Marilyn Maye reading" that "has enough swing to fit the most progressive MOR formats" and the other by Tony Mottola that was "stunning in instrumental array". Three albums from 1970 also had notable covers. In their review of Ray Conniff's Bridge over Troubled Water, they included the song on a list of the tracks that "are all given that unmistakable Conniff sound". Bobby Vinton's Instrumental Sounds of Love showcased the singer's talents playing the electric saxophone. The editors wrote, "The artist comes through with a smooth and listenable sound on items such as 'I'll Never Fall In Love Again'." On Stan Getz's Marrakesh Express, it was one of the songs that was "neatly arranged and rendered".

=== AllMusic reviews ===
AllMusic critics remarked on covers of the song in retrospective reviews. Joe Viglione described Shirley Bassey's 1969 recording on her album Does Anybody Miss Me as "a strong reading", noting that it included "a verse not on Dionne Warwick's hit". Jason Ankeny found Emmylou Harris's cover on her 1970 album Gliding Bird to be "ill-suited". In his review of The Dells Sing Dionne Warwicke's Greatest Hits, Thom Jurek wrote,

The radical interpretations of these tunes, from the deep, smooth soul of "I'll Never Fall in Love Again" with its lithe, sprightly, jazz-funk backdrop to the dynamic "Raindrops Keep Fallin on My Head", with its staggered strings and counterpoint horn fills are outrageous but in the pocket.

When Bacharach and Elvis Costello collaborated to record the song for the soundtrack of the 1999 film Austin Powers: The Spy Who Shagged Me, Gina Boldman listed it as one of the "highlights", describing it as "classy and classic".

== See also ==
- List of number-one singles of 1969 (Ireland)
- List of number-one singles from the 1960s (UK)
- List of number-one adult contemporary singles of 1970 (U.S.)

== Bibliography ==
- Bacharach, Burt; Greenfield, Robert (2013), Anyone Who Had a Heart: My Life and Music, Harper Collins, ISBN 978-0062206060
- Kent, David (1993), Australian Chart Book 1970–1992, Australian Chart Book, St. Ives, N.S.W., ISBN 978-0-64611-917-5
- O'Neil, Thomas (1999), The Grammys, Perigree Books, ISBN 0-399-52477-0
