= The Delta Sweete =

Studio album by Bobbie Gentry
- Released: February 5, 1968
- Recorded: July 16–December 12, 1967
- Studio: Capitol (Hollywood, California)
- Genre: Southern soul
- Length: 33:37
- Label: Capitol
- Producer: Kelly Gordon

Bobbie Gentry chronology
Ode to Billie Joe (1967)	The Delta Sweete (1968)	Local Gentry (1968)

Way Down South
- Cover art of the 1972 UK reissue.

Singles from The Delta Sweete
- 1. "Okolona River Bottom Band" Released: November 13, 1967; 2. "Louisiana Man" Released: March 25, 1968; 3. "Refractions" Released: May 10, 1968; 4. "Big Boss Man" Released: May 1968

The Delta Sweete is the second studio album by American singer-songwriter Bobbie Gentry. It was released on February 5, 1968, by Capitol Records. The album was produced by Kelly Gordon.

== Background ==
One week after "Ode to Billie Joe" concluded its four-week reign at the top of the Billboard Hot 100, Gentry returned home to the South. September 30, 1967 was declared "Bobbie Gentry Day" in Houston, Mississippi, which is the county seat of Chickasaw County. It was estimated that 5,000 people attended. Life magazine turned up to interview Gentry for a feature story that would appear in the November issue accompanied by a photograph of Gentry on the Tallahatchie Bridge. Gentry returned to California the following month to begin work on her second album.

== Recording ==
The earliest recording on the album, "Penduli Pendulum", was recorded on July 16, 1967, during one of Gentry's first sessions at Capitol Studios after being signed to Capitol Records. "Okolona River Bottom Band" and "Courtyard" were recorded on October 5. "Big Boss Man" and "Parchman Farm" were recorded on November 4, with "Big Boss Man" being overdubbed on December 13. The most productive session for the album took place on November 11, yielding "Sermon", "Reunion", "Refractions", "Mornin' Glory", and "Jesse 'Lisabeth". The last three titles would be overdubbed on December 7. The final two tracks recorded for the album were "Louisiana Man" and "Tobacco Road" on December 12.

== Title and artwork ==
The Sweete in the album's title is a play on words, referring to both Gentry's appearance (a pretty girl in the South might be called a "sweete") and the album's suite structure.

The cover art is evocative of the music on the record. It features a double exposure of a black and white close up of Gentry's face superimposed over a color photo of a shack on Gentry's grandparent's farm where she grew up.

== Content ==
The Delta Sweete is a concept album based on modern life in the Deep South. Gentry wrote eight of the album's 12 tracks, which detail her Mississippi childhood and includes vignettes of home and church life ("Reunion" and "Sermon"), as well as recollections of blues and country hits she heard as a youngster ("Big Boss Man" and "Tobacco Road"). The song "Okolona River Bottom Band", accented by a sophisticated horn chart and breathy strings, used the same basic cadence as "Ode to Billie Joe".

Recording sessions for the album emphasized the unique sound of Gentry's guitar picking and her singing and phrasing styles. The prevailing sound on the album was a swampy, folk-tinged combination of blues and country, with uptown touches like strings and horns seemingly added to reflect the then modern styles of soul music and the Nashville sound.

The album opens with "Okolona River Bottom Band", a swampy southern groove featuring an intricate horn arrangement from Jimmie Haskell and Shorty Rogers. A cover of "Big Boss Man" follows. Gentry infuses the song with a little innuendo as she tells the audience with a small laugh, about finding her own boss "that's gonna treat me right". Track three, "Reunion", featuring Ramblin' Jack Elliott, is another Gentry original which paints the picture of a family bickering around the dinner table. It features a proto-rap structure to the rhythm of jump rope games from Gentry's childhood. "Parchman Farm" is a cover of a song by Mose Allison, which was itself a modified version of a song by Bukka White. The chain-gang lament blends into Gentry's Delta landscape perfectly. Track five is the sensual "Mornin' Glory", a Gentry original. Side one closes with "Sermon", an idiosyncratic take on the traditional gospel tune "Run On", making it seem menacing and perversely joyous at the same time.

The second half of the album begins with a cover of the bittersweet "Tobacco Road", performed in a cinematic style featuring a Mariachi band sound and strings. Track eight, Penduli Pendulum", is a perplexing psychedelic listening experience. "Jesse' Lisabeth" is a tender folk fable that exudes a foreboding feeling. "Refractions" is an eerie chamber pop number about a crystal bird suspended in the air, unable to land because its legs are broken. Track eleven is a cover of "Louisiana Man", and it is the only track that seems to be a geographic departure from the album's title and theme. The album closes with "Courtyard", the story of a woman suffocated by luxury and imprisoned by the empty promises of her lover.

== Critical reception ==
Professional ratings
Review scores
Source	Rating
AllMusic	4.5/5 stars
Pitchfork	8.7/10

The album received positive reviews upon its release. Billboard said that while "Gentry's last album skyrocketed to the top of the albums chart, this one is not going to even approach that one in sales." The review went on to praise Gentry's singing as "fine", which should still result in "respectable sales."

Cashbox praised the album, saying that Gentry had "survived the storm and her second album is better than her first." They felt that Gentry's songwriting on the album showed her as "an effective ballad writer as well as a skillful portrayer of the life of the Mississippi Delta country."

Stephen Cook from AllMusic gave the album four and a half out of five stars. He praised the album, describing it as "a swampy, folk-tinged combination of blues and country, with uptown touches."

== Legacy ==
The album's critical stature has grown since its initial release. Writing for The Guardian in 2013, writer Dorian Lynskey called the album "a lost masterpiece," noting that "although Capitol's in-house producer Kelly Gordon stamped his name on the credits, most of The Delta Sweete's innovative, sophisticated sound is down to Gentry herself, who played piano, guitar, banjo, bass and vibes. Swampy southern grooves mingle with the latest Nashville trends, blue-eyed soul akin to the more celebrated Dusty in Memphis". Lynskey called Gentry "a fabulously mercurial singer and lyricist," and stated that "she probably doesn't worry about The Delta Sweete not getting its due as a masterpiece. She told her stories, she made her money, she got what she wanted. What you really need to know about how that felt, about what home means to you once you've left it behind for bigger and more complicated things, is contained in these songs."

In 2020, Popmatters called it "a lost and unjustly ignored masterpiece," and "a wonderful album."

In 2021, Pitchfork called it "a daring, atmospheric, and oft-overshadowed Southern classic." The retrospective review commented that "what thrills most about The Delta Sweete now is that sense of adventurousness. Gentry’s chord and rhythms voicings are rarely obvious, and her voice sounds almost uncomfortably close in the mix and low in her range. The quiet moments are whispered and meditative, the busy ones are alive with a dozen voices. She recorded this album as she was in the process of becoming an enormous star, but it doesn’t feel indulgent... Few artists have had such an outsize effect on the shape of “Americana” music in such a short period of time, and few have paid so little heed to the restrictions of that lineage. The Delta Sweete is her least restricted statement of all."

In 2019, Mercury Rev released Bobbie Gentry's The Delta Sweete Revisited, featuring guest performances by Norah Jones, Hope Sandoval, Phoebe Bridgers and Marissa Nadler among others. Lucinda Williams contributed a cover of "Ode to Billie Joe", the only song featured on the album that did not originate from The Delta Sweete.

== Commercial performance ==
Despite receiving positive reviews from music critics, the album only managed to peak at number 132 on the Billboard Top LPs chart. The album fared a little better on the Cashbox charts, peaking at number 72 on the Top 100 Albums chart and number 26 on the Top Country Albums chart. When asked by NME about the under-performance of the album, Gentry replied, "I didn't lose any sleep over it. I've never tried to second-guess public taste. If I were just a performer and not a writer, I might have felt more insecure about the whole thing."

The album's first single, "Okolona River Bottom Band", was released in November 1967. It peaked at number 54 on the Billboard Hot 100 and at number 49 in Canada on the RPM Top Singles chart.

Released in March 1968, the second single, "Louisiana Man", peaked at number 100 on the Billboard Hot 100, number 72 on the Billboard Hot Country Singles chart and number 23 on Australia's Kent Music Report Singles Chart.

In May 1968, "Refractions" and "Big Boss Man", were released in Japan and France, respectively. Both singles failed to chart.

== Reissues ==
The album was reissued in the US in 1971 by Capitol Records under the title Tobacco Road. This release omits the tracks "Big Boss Man" and "Parchman Farm", reorders the track listing and features new cover art. The album was reissued in the UK in 1972 by EMI's budget label mfp, under the title Way Down South, featuring the original track listing and new cover art.

Australian label Raven Records released the album on CD for the first time in 2006, paired with 1968’s Local Gentry. The album was made available for digital download in 2007.

A deluxe edition of the album was released on July 31, 2020, featuring a new stereo mix of the album by Andrew Batt, (who also co-produced the re-issue) sourced from the surviving four-track and eight-track tapes, along with the original mono mix. The deluxe edition will include 10 bonus tracks, featuring the previously unreleased demo "The Way I Do" and an instrumental version of "Okolona River Bottom Band".

== Track listing ==
All tracks written by Bobbie Gentry, except where noted.

Original release (1968), Way Down South (1972)

Side one
No.	Title	Writer(s)	Recording date	Length
1.	"Okolona River Bottom Band"		October 5, 1967	2:57
2.	"Big Boss Man"	Luther Dixon, Al Smith	November 4, 1967	2:56
3.	"Reunion"		November 11, 1967	2:35
4.	"Parchman Farm"	Mose Allison	November 4, 1967	3:00
5.	"Mornin' Glory"		November 11, 1967	2:57
6.	"Sermon"		November 11, 1967	2:41

Side two
No.	Title	Writer(s)	Recording date	Length
1.	"Tobacco Road"	John D. Loudermilk	December 12, 1967	2:57
2.	"Penduli Pendulum"		July 16, 1967	2:56
3.	"Jessye' Lisabeth"		November 11, 1967	2:35
4.	"Refractions"		November 11, 1967	3:00
5.	"Louisiana Man"	Doug Kershaw	December 12, 1967	2:57
6.	"Courtyard"		October 5, 1967	2:41

Tobacco Road (1971)

Cover art of the 1971 Tobacco Road release.

Side one
No.	Title	Writer(s)	Length
1.	"Okolona River Bottom Band"		2:57
2.	"Louisiana Man"	Doug Kershaw	2:57
3.	"Reunion"		2:35
4.	"Mornin' Glory"		2:57
5.	"Sermon"		2:41

Side two
No.	Title	Writer(s)	Length
1.	"Tobacco Road"	John D. Loudermilk	2:57
2.	"Penduli Pendulum"		2:56
3.	"Jessye' Lisabeth"		2:35
4.	"Refractions"		3:00
5.	"Courtyard"		2:41

Deluxe Edition (2020)

Disc 1
No.	Title	Writer(s)	Length
1.	"Okolona River Bottom Band" (Remixed 2020)		2:58
2.	"Big Boss Man" (Remixed 2020)	Luther Dixon, Al Smith	2:59
3.	"Reunion" (Remixed 2020)		2:39
4.	"Parchman Farm" (Remixed 2020)	Mose Allison	3:11
5.	"Mornin' Glory" (Remixed 2020)		3:08
6.	"Sermon" (Remixed 2020)		2:34
7.	"Tobacco Road" (Remixed 2020)	John D. Loudermilk	2:51
8.	"Penduli Pendulum" (Remixed 2020)		1:55
9.	"Jessye' Lisabeth" (Remixed 2020)		3:07
10.	"Refractions" (Remixed 2020)		2:21
11.	"Louisiana Man" (Remixed 2020)	Doug Kershaw	2:42
12.	"Courtyard" (Remixed 2020)		2:56
13.	"Okolona River Bottom Band" (Instrumental)		2:42
14.	"Mississippi Delta" (Alternate Take)		3:06
15.	"Seventh Son" (Band Version)		2:53
16.	"The Way I Do" (Demo)		3:36
17.	"Feelin' Good" (Demo)		3:21

Disc 2
No.	Title	Writer(s)	Length
1.	"Okolona River Bottom Band" (Original Mono Mix)		2:56
2.	"Big Boss Man" (Original Mono Mix)	Luther Dixon, Al Smith	3:00
3.	"Reunion" (Original Mono Mix)		2:38
4.	"Parchman Farm" (Original Mono Mix)	Mose Allison	3:11
5.	"Mornin' Glory" (Original Mono Mix)		3:09
6.	"Sermon" (Original Mono Mix)		2:34
7.	"Tobacco Road" (Original Mono Mix)	John D. Loudermilk	2:50
8.	"Penduli Pendulum" (Original Mono Mix)		1:55
9.	"Jessye' Lisabeth" (Original Mono Mix)		3:11
10.	"Refractions" (Original Mono Mix)		2:20
11.	"Louisiana Man" (Original Mono Mix)	Doug Kershaw	2:42
12.	"Courtyard" (Original Mono Mix)		2:57
13.	"Mornin' Glory" (Demo)		3:04
14.	"Sermon" (Demo)		2:25
15.	"Jessye' Lisabeth" (Demo)		3:13
16.	"Refractions" (Demo)		2:31
17.	"Louisiana Man" (Demo)	Kershaw	2:20

== Personnel ==
Adapted from the 2020 reissue liner notes.

- Bobbie Gentry – vocals
- Kelly Gordon – producer

Rhythm section

- Dale Anderson – mallets, timpani
- Max Bennett – fender bass, electric bass, string bass
- Hal Blaine – drums, congas, chimes
- Ray Brown – fender bass
- Dennis Budimir – bells, percussion
- James Burton – guitar
- Michael Casey – electric guitar
- George Fields – harmonica, cross harp
- Bobbie Gentry – rhythm arrangements, acoustic guitar, vibes, keyboards, Ondes Martenot
- Cliff Hills – bass guitar
- Del Kacher – guitar
- Harry Middlebrooks – hambone percussion
- Oliver E. Mitchell – drums, congas, mallets
- Earl Palmer – Latin percussion
- Chester Ricord – timpani

Horn section

- Louis Blackburn – trombone
- Harold Diner – trombone
- Richard Leith – trombone
- Gail Martin – trombone
- Lew McCreary – trombone
- Ollie Mitchell – trumpet
- Shorty Rogers – horn arrangements, trumpet, bass trumpet
- Jack Sheldon – trumpet
- Kenneth Shroyer – trombone
- Tony Terran – trumpet

String section

- Benjamin Barrett – conductor
- Harry Bluestone – violin
- Henry Both – violin
- Jesse Ehrlich – cello
- James Getsoff – violin, viola
- Jimmie Haskell – string arrangements
- Armand Kaproff – cello
- Raphael Kraemer – cello
- William Kurasch – violin
- Anne Leadman – cello
- Leonard Malarsky – violin
- Harry L. Roth – violin
- Joseph Saxon – cello
- Sidney Sharp – violin, viola
- Paul Shure – violin
- Marshall Sosson – violin
- Tibor Zelig – violin

== Charts ==
Album

Chart	Peak position
US Top 100 Albums (Cashbox)	72
US Top Country Albums (Cashbox)	26
US Top LP's (Billboard)	132
Scottish Albums (OCC)	22
UK Country Albums (OCC)	2

Singles

Title	Year	Peak chart positions				
Title	Year	US	US Country	US CB	AU	CAN
"Okolona River Bottom Band"	1967	54	—	41	—	49
"Louisiana Man"	1968	100	72	96	23	—
