= Fancy (Bobbie Gentry song) =

1969 single by Bobbie Gentry

- Side A of the original US single

Single by Bobbie Gentry

from the album Fancy
- B-side: "Court Yard"
- Released: November 3, 1969
- Recorded: 1969
- Studio: FAME (Muscle Shoals, Alabama)
- Genre: Country, southern soul
- Length: 4:15
- Label: Capitol
- Songwriter: Bobbie Gentry
- Producer: Rick Hall

Bobbie Gentry singles chronology
| "Casket Vignette" (1969) | "Fancy" (1969) | "All I Have to Do Is Dream" (1970) |

"Fancy" is a song written and recorded by Bobbie Gentry in 1969. The country song was a crossover pop music hit for Gentry, reaching the top 40 of the Billboard Hot 100 (her second and final solo single to do so) and the top 30 of the Billboard country chart.

== Content ==
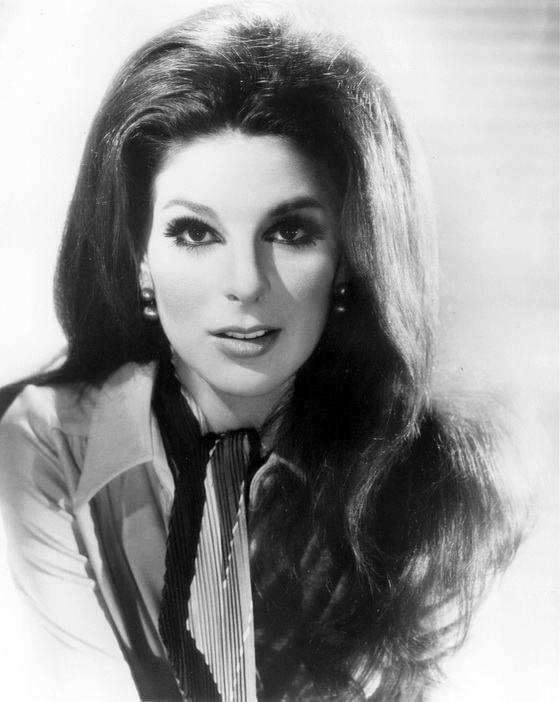
Gentry in 1969

The song depicts its protagonist using prostitution to overcome childhood poverty. Gentry viewed the song as a feminist statement:

"Fancy" is my strongest statement for women's lib, if you really listen to it. I agree wholeheartedly with that movement and all the serious issues that they stand for — equality, equal pay, day care centers, and abortion rights.

The Southern Gothic-style song is told from the perspective of a woman named Fancy looking back to the summer she was 18 years old.

Fancy and her "plain white trash" family (and infant sibling and their mother, the father having abandoned them) lived in poverty — "a one room, rundown shack on the outskirts of New Orleans". Her mother is terminally ill and has no way to care for the baby.

In a last desperate act to save Fancy from the cycle of poverty, her mother spends her last money to buy Fancy a red "dancing dress", makeup and perfume, and a locket inscribed with the phrase "To thine own self be true". She encourages Fancy to "start movin' uptown" and to "be nice to the gentlemen, Fancy, and they'll be nice to you," saying that this is the only way Fancy will be able to gain financial independence.

Fancy recalls her mother's parting words: "Here's your one chance, Fancy, don't let me down" and "If you want out, well, it's up to you." Fancy departs, never to return; shortly thereafter, her mother dies and the baby is placed in foster care. She becomes trapped in her new way of life, her "head hung down in shame," and vows to find a way to become "a lady someday, though (she) didn't know when or how." Fancy is taken in off the streets by a "benevolent man" and begins having relationships with wealthy, powerful men, which she parlays into owning a Georgia mansion and a New York City townhouse flat. In the present day, fifteen years after being taken in off the streets, she denounces "self-righteous hypocrites" who criticize her mother for putting Fancy into that situation, justifying both her and her mother's actions by flashing back to the distress her mother expressed when she sent Fancy onto the streets, and celebrating the prosperity she now enjoys because of her actions.

Much of the fictional Fancy story had parallels in Gentry's own life: she too had grown up in poverty in the South, and a month after the song was released, she married the casino magnate Bill Harrah in a marriage that would last four months. She also cited the film Ruby Gentry, from which she took her stage surname, as an inspiration for both the song and her personal life.

== Critical reception ==
The song was a cross-over country and pop hit for Gentry in early 1970. The album containing the song received a Grammy nomination for "Best Contemporary Pop Vocal Performance, Female".

== Chart performance ==
| Chart (1969–1970) | Peak position |
|---|---|
| US Hot Country Songs (Billboard) | 26 |
| US Adult Contemporary (Billboard) | 8 |
| US Billboard Hot 100 | 31 |
| Canadian RPM Country Tracks | 1 |
| Canadian RPM Adult Contemporary Tracks | 20 |
| Canadian RPM Top Singles | 26 |
| Australian Singles Chart (Kent Music Report) | 70 |
| U.S. Cash Box Country Top 60 | 8 |
| U.S. Cash Box Top Singles | 31 |

== Reba McEntire version ==
"Fancy"
- Side A of the original US single

Single by Reba McEntire

from the album Rumor Has It
- B-side: "This Picture"
- Released: February 11, 1991
- Recorded: April 1990
- Genre: Country
- Length: 4:58
- Label: MCA S7-54042
- Songwriter: Bobbie Gentry
- Producers: Tony Brown; Reba McEntire

Reba McEntire singles chronology
| "Rumor Has It" (1990) | "Fancy" (1991) | "Fallin' Out of Love" (1991) |

In 1990, Reba McEntire covered the song, which was included on her album Rumor Has It. McEntire's version surpassed the original on the country music charts, reaching number eight on the Top Ten on Billboard's Hot Country Songs chart. McEntire also produced a popular music video for the song, expanding on the song's storyline. For years, McEntire has encored her live concerts with the hit, singing the first half of the song in a ragged black mink coat and hat then removing them to reveal a floor length red gown for the second half. She has referred to the song as her "possible signature hit". (The edit of the song heard on most radio stations cuts the song short after three verses, before the title character makes it off the streets.) McEntire had wanted to record the song since 1984 but her producer Jimmy Bowen was against it because he believed the song was too closely associated with Gentry. When Reba began working with producer Tony Brown, she was finally able to do so. As of November 2019, the song has sold 760,000 digital copies in the United States.

=== Critical reception ===
In 2024, Rolling Stone ranked McEntire's rendition at #65 on its 200 Greatest Country Songs of All Time ranking.

=== Music video ===
The music video for the song tells the story of the song itself in more detail. It opens with the title character, Fancy Rae Baker, played by McEntire, riding in a taxi cab and arriving at the site of the small shack on the outskirts of New Orleans where she grew up, which is now abandoned. The video takes something of a creative license with the song as McEntire's version of Fancy, much like McEntire herself, is a famous singer and actress. The story of the song plays out against the background accompanied by flashbacks of Fancy's past with her mother and baby sibling playing prominent roles.

Near the end of the video, Fancy visits her mother's grave in the backyard of the shack and sees her mother's ghost standing nearby. She tells her that she understands now and forgives her. As the video ends, Fancy departs in her taxi and a large sign is seen in the front yard that says that the property is to be the future home of the Fancy Rae Baker Home for Runaways, dedicated to the memory of her late mother, with the home's motto "to thine own self be true" (the engraving on the locket Fancy's mother gave her before she left, which she threw down before leaving but retrieved at her return and placed on her mother's gravestone).

Though the song's lyrics indicate that the events described took place in the summer Fancy turned 18, in the video, the clothing worn by the characters, and the surrounding bare foliage, would appear to indicate winter conditions in southern Louisiana. The video was actually filmed on a cold, rainy, January day, a few miles outside Nashville, Tennessee.

=== Chart performance ===
| Chart (1991) | Peak position |
|---|---|
| Canada Country Singles (RPM) | 8 |
| US Hot Country Songs (Billboard) | 8 |

==== Dave Aude remix ====
| Chart (2021) | Peak position |
|---|---|
| US Hot Dance/Electronic Songs (Billboard) | 42 |

=== Certifications ===
| Region | Certification | Certified units/sales |
|---|---|---|
| United States (RIAA) | 3× Platinum | 3,000,000^{‡} |
^{‡} Sales+streaming figures based on certification alone.

== References in Stephen King's book "Duma Key" ==
In Stephen King's book Duma Key, there are some references to this song. In the book Edgar says he called his doll "Reba" because the radio in his car played Reba McEntire's song "Fancy" when he had his accident, and when he forgets his doll's name, he thinks about the song, especially about the sentence: "...It was RED!..." from the song. Also, there are many references to this particular sentence ("...It was RED!...") when something in the book is red, because his car radio played the song when the accident happened.
