= Bobbie Gentry and Glen Campbell =

Studio album by Bobbie Gentry and Glen Campbell
- Released: September 16, 1968
- Recorded: April 11–August 11, 1968
- Studio: Capitol Recording Studio (Hollywood)
- Genre: Country pop
- Length: 29:45
- Label: Capitol
- Producer: Kelly Gordon, Al DeLory

Bobbie Gentry chronology
Local Gentry (1968)	Bobbie Gentry and Glen Campbell (1968)	Touch 'Em with Love (1968)

Glen Campbell chronology
A New Place in the Sun (1968)	Bobbie Gentry and Glen Campbell (1968)	That Christmas Feeling (1968)

All I Have to Do Is Dream
- Cover art of the 1983 UK reissue.

Singles from Bobbie Gentry and Glen Campbell
- 1. "Mornin' Glory" Released: October 14, 1968; 2. "Little Green Apples" Released: November 1968; 3. "Let It Be Me" Released: January 13, 1969

Professional ratings
Review scores
Source	Rating
Allmusic	4/5 stars

Bobbie Gentry and Glen Campbell is the collaborative studio album by American singers Bobbie Gentry and Glen Campbell. It was released on September 16, 1968, by Capitol Records.

The album spawned two hit singles and was certified gold by the Recording Industry Association of America. It was also awarded the Academy of Country Music Award for Album of the Year in 1969.

Gentry toured briefly with Campbell and performed on a number of American and British television programs and specials.

The album was reissued in the UK in 1983 by EMI's budget label mfp, under the title All I Have to Do Is Dream, featuring new cover art and a slightly re-sequenced track listing, including the duo's 1969 single "All I Have to Do Is Dream".

== Critical reception ==
In the issue dated September 28, 1968, Billboard magazine published a review calling the album "a dynamite sales package teaming the talents of Campbell and Gentry. The duetting on a well planned program of pop hits is a natural for fast programming and top sales. They excel in their blend of Campbell's hit "Gentle on My Mind" and "My Elusive Dreams". The Bobbie Gentry composition "Mornin' Glory" comes up a winner in their reading."

Cashbox also published a review on September 28, which said, "Capitol has combined the talents of its two top pop/country artists and the result is sure to be a profitable sales future. Artistically the pair go together like Siamese twins, and there could be several singles in the set. Our choice is "Sunday Mornin'", the recent Spanky and Our Gang effort, but votes can also be cast for "Scarborough fair / Canticle" and "Less of Me", the latter a Campbell original. Multi-market airplay and sales on tap."

The review published in Record World said, "Two country folks who recently brought their talents to town and TV and other places, get together for a little hoedown slowdown showdown. Very pretty renditions of "Mornin' Glory", "My Elusive Dreams", "Sunday Mornin'" and "Scarborough Fair"."

== Commercial performance ==
The album peaked at No. 1 on the US Billboard Top Country LP's chart and No. 11 on the US Billboard Top LP's chart. In Canada the album peaked at No. 8 on the RPM Top Albums chart. In the UK the album peaked at No. 50 on the OCC Albums Chart.

The album was certified gold by the RIAA on January 29, 1969.

The album's first single, "Mornin' Glory", was released in October 1968. It peaked at No. 32 on the US Billboard Top 40 Easy Listening chart and No. 74 on the US Billboard Hot 100. In Canada the single peaked at No. 81 on the RPM Top Singles chart. The single's B-side, "Less of Me", peaked at No. 44 on the US Billboard Hot Country Singles chart.

In November 1968, "Little Green Apples" was released as a single in Brazil, but failed to chart.

"Let It Be Me", was released as a single in January 1969. It peaked at No. 7 on the US Billboard Top 40 Easy Listening chart, No. 14 on the US Billboard Hot Country Singles chart and No. 36 on the US Billboard Hot 100. In Canada the single peaked at No. 1 on the RPM Top Country Singles chart, No. 15 on the RPM Top Easy Listening Singles chart and No. 85 on the RPM Top Singles chart.

== Recording ==
Gentry and Campbell began recording the album on April 11, 1968, at Capitol Recording Studio in Hollywood, with "Little Green Apples", "Gentle on My Mind", "Heart to Heart Talk" and "Scarborough Fair / Canticle". "My Elusive Dreams" and "Let It Be Me" were also recording during this session with overdub sessions on April 1, May 28 and August 2. "(It's Only Your) Imagination" was recorded at this session also and overdubbed on May 10, August 2 and August 6. On April 12, 1968, "Sunday Mornin'" was recorded, with an overdub session on August 6. Recording of the album was completed on July 30, 1968, with "Less of Me", "Mornin' Glory" and "Terrible Tangled Web", with overdub sessions on August 2, August 6 and August 11.

== Track listing ==
Original release (1968)

Side one
No.	Title	Writer(s)	Recording date	Length
1.	"Less of Me"	Glen Campbell	July 30, 1968	2:08
2.	"Little Green Apples"	Bobby Russell	April 11, 1968	3:13
3.	"Gentle on My Mind"	John Hartford	April 11, 1968	3:07
4.	"Heart to Heart Talk"	Lee Ross	April 11, 1968	2:52
5.	"My Elusive Dreams"	Curly Putman, Billy Sherrill	April 11, 1968	3:11
6.	"(It's Only Your) Imagination"	Campbell	April 11, 1968	1:53

Side two
No.	Title	Writer(s)	Recording date	Length
1.	"Mornin' Glory"	Bobbie Gentry	July 30, 1968	2:52
2.	"Terrible Tangled Web"	Billy Mize	July 30, 1968	2:02
3.	"Sunday Mornin'"	Margo Guryan	April 12, 1968	2:30
4.	"Let It Be Me"	Gilbert Bécaud, Mann Curtis, Pierre Delanoë	April 11, 1968	2:04
5.	"Scarborough Fair / Canticle"	Traditional; arr. by Paul Simon, Art Garfunkel	April 11, 1968	3:20

All I Have to Do Is Dream (1983)

Side one
No.	Title	Writer(s)	Length
1.	"All I Have to Do Is Dream"	Boudleaux Bryant	2:32
2.	"Less of Me"	Campbell	2:08
3.	"Gentle on My Mind"	Hartford	3:07
4.	"Heart to Heart Talk"	Ross	2:52
5.	"My Elusive Dreams"	Putman, Sherrill	3:11
6.	"Let It Be Me"	Bécaud, Curtis, Delanoë	2:04

Side two
No.	Title	Writer(s)	Length
1.	"Little Green Apples"	Russell	3:13
2.	"Mornin' Glory"	Gentry	2:52
3.	"Terrible Tangled Web"	Mize	2:02
4.	"Sunday Mornin'"	Guryan	2:30
5.	"(It's Only Your) Imagination"	Campbell	1:53
6.	"Scarborough Fair / Canticle"	Traditional; arr. by Simon, Garfunkel	3:20

== Personnel ==
Adapted from the album liner notes.

- Dick Brown - cover photo
- Glen Campbell – vocals
- Al DeLory – producer, arrangements, conductor
- Bobbie Gentry – vocals
- Kelly Gordon – producer
- Tommy Oliver – arrangements, conductor

== Chart positions ==
Album

Year	Chart	Chart position
1968	Canada Top Albums (RPM)	8
1968	UK Albums Chart (OCC)	50
1968	US Top LP's (Billboard)	11
1968	US Top Country LP's (Billboard)	1

Singles

Year	Single	Chart	Chart position
1968	"Mornin' Glory"	Canada Top Singles (RPM)	81
1968	"Mornin' Glory"	US Top 40 Easy Listening (Billboard)	32
1968	"Mornin' Glory"	US Hot 100 (Billboard)	74
1968	"Less of Me"	US Hot Country Singles (Billboard)	44
1969	"Let It Be Me"	Canada Top Easy Listening Singles (RPM)	15
1969	"Let It Be Me"	Canada Top Country Singles (RPM)	1
1969	"Let It Be Me"	Canada Top Singles (RPM)	85
1969	"Let It Be Me"	US Top 40 Easy Listening (Billboard)	7
1969	"Let It Be Me"	US Hot Country Singles (Billboard)	14
1969	"Let It Be Me"	US Hot 100 (Billboard)	36
