= Bobbie Gentry =

American singer-songwriter (born 1942)

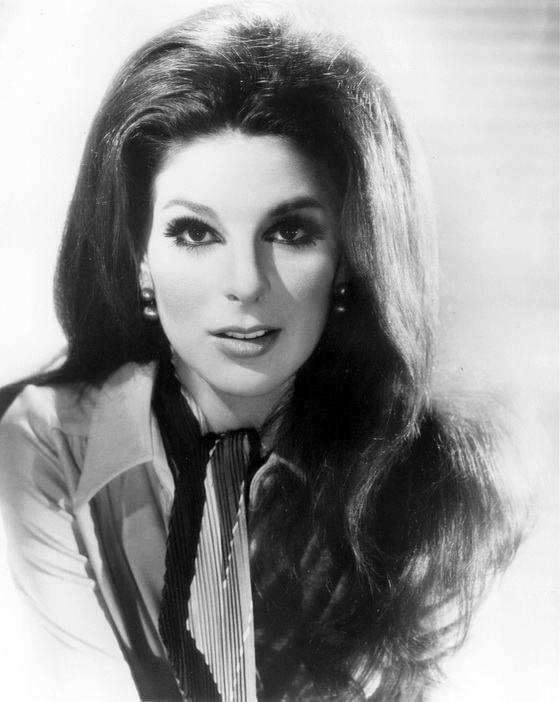
- Publicity photo for Capitol Records, 1969
- Born: Roberta Lee Streeter; July 27, 1942 (age 84) near Woodland, Mississippi, U.S.
- Occupation: Singer-songwriter
- Known for: "Ode to Billie Joe"
- Spouses: Bill Harrah (m. 1969; div. 1970) Thomas R. Toutant (m. 1976; div. 1978) Jim Stafford (m. 1978; div. 1980)
- Children: 1
- Musical career
- Genres: Folk; country; blue-eyed soul; pop
- Instruments: Vocals, guitar
- Years active: 1966–1982
- Labels: Titan (1966); Capitol (1967–1972); Brunswick (1975); Warner Bros. (1976–1978)

Signature
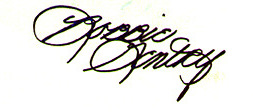

Bobbie Gentry (born Roberta Lee Streeter, July 27, 1942) is an American retired singer-songwriter. She was one of the first female artists in the United States to compose and produce her own material.

Gentry rose to international fame in 1967 with her Southern Gothic narrative "Ode to Billie Joe". The track spent four weeks at number one on the Billboard Hot 100 chart and was third in the Billboard year-end chart of 1967, earning Gentry the Grammy Awards for Best New Artist and Best Female Pop Vocal Performance in 1968.

Gentry charted 11 singles on the Billboard Hot 100 and four singles on the United Kingdom top 40. Her album Fancy brought her a Grammy nomination for Best Female Pop Vocal Performance. After her first albums, she had a successful run of variety shows in Las Vegas. In the late 1970s, Gentry lost interest in performing and retired from the music industry.

== Early life ==
Gentry was born Roberta Lee Streeter on July 27, 1942, near Woodland in Chickasaw County, Mississippi, to Ruby Lee (née Shipman; November 28, 1920 – April 2, 1989) and Robert Harrison Streeter. When her parents divorced shortly after her birth, her mother moved to California, leaving Gentry to be raised on a farm by her paternal grandparents. She grew up without electricity or plumbing. Her grandmother traded one of the family's milk cows for a neighbor's piano, and at age seven, Gentry composed her first song, "My Dog Sergeant Is a Good Dog". Gentry lived in Greenwood, Mississippi, with her father for a few years and learned to play the guitar and banjo.

At age 13, Gentry moved to Palm Springs, California, to live with her then-remarried mother. They performed as a duo, Ruby and Bobbie Meyers, for a short time. Gentry took her stage name from the 1952 film Ruby Gentry, which she had seen on television.

After graduating from high school, Gentry moved to Los Angeles to enter UCLA as a philosophy major. She supported herself with clerical jobs, occasionally performing at nightclubs and country clubs, and when she appeared in a revue at Les Folies Bergeres nightclub in Las Vegas, Bob Hope encouraged her to keep performing. She worked as a fashion model, and on June 29, 1962, United Press International circulated a wire photo of Gentry that included Cheryl Crane, daughter of Lana Turner. Gentry transferred to the Los Angeles Conservatory of Music, where she took classes in composition, music theory, and arranging. While attending a Jody Reynolds concert at a club in Palm Springs in 1966, Gentry asked if she could sit in on one of Reynolds' recording sessions. This led to an invitation to sing on two duets with Reynolds: "Stranger in the Mirror" and "Requiem for Love". The two songs were released in September 1966 by Titan Records, but failed to chart.

== Career ==
=== 1967: Debut ===
Gentry recorded a demonstration tape at Whitney Recording Studio in Glendale, California, in February and March 1967. Her sole ambition originally was to write songs to sell to other artists, telling The Washington Post that she only sang on the recording of "Ode to Billie Joe" that she took to Capitol because it was cheaper than hiring someone to sing it.

Gentry signed with Capitol Records on June 23, 1967, where staff producer Kelly Gordon produced Ode to Billie Joe as his first full-length album for the label, but "Mississippi Delta", intended as the A-side of her first single, initially got Gentry signed. Her original demo of "Mississippi Delta" was the version issued, but "Ode to Billie Joe" acquired a string arrangement by Jimmie Haskell, dubbed onto the original recording at Capitol. The day after the string session, Capitol's A&R team decided to make "Ode to Billie Joe" the A-side. The single was released on July 10, 1967. It spent four weeks at number one on the Billboard Hot 100, and on the year-end chart, placed number three. The single reached number eight on the Billboard Black Singles chart and number 13 on the UK top 40. It sold more than 3,000,000 copies worldwide. In 2001, Rolling Stone listed "Ode to Billie Joe" among the 500 Greatest Songs of All Time.

Following the single's success, the producers quickly assembled the rest of the album from the 12 demos Gentry had recorded, completing overdubs in a matter of days. The result was a combination of blues, folk, and jazz elements that rounded out Gentry's recollections of her home, coming across more as a concept album than a hastily assembled collection of songs. Capitol preordered 500,000 copies—the largest pressing of a debut album in the label's prior history. The album hit stores within a month of pressing, on August 21. Ode to Billie Joe replaced the Beatles' Sgt. Pepper's Lonely Hearts Club Band at the top of the Billboard 200 and reached number five on the Billboard Black Albums chart. Gentry won three Grammy Awards in 1967, including Best New Artist and Best Female Pop Vocal Performance. She was also named the Academy of Country Music's Most Promising Female Vocalist.

=== 1968: The Delta Sweete, Local Gentry, and Glen Campbell ===
In February 1968, Gentry took part in the Italian Song Festival in Sanremo as one of two performers of "La siepe" by Vito Pallavicini and Massara. Capitol released the song concurrently as a single, backed by another Italian tune also recorded by Gentry, "La città è grande" by Pallavicini and De Ponti.

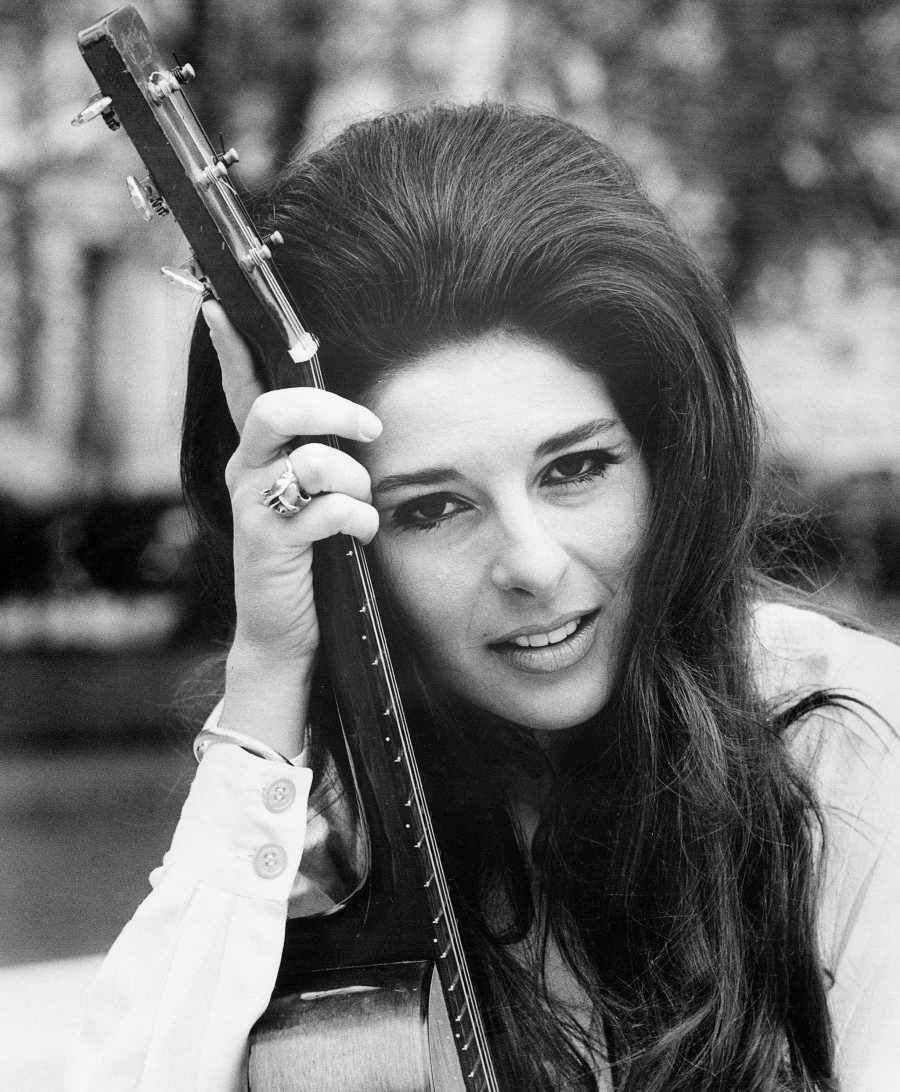
Gentry in 1968

Gentry's second album, The Delta Sweete, was released in February 1968. In its musical ambition, the album represented a decisive step beyond her debut. This concept album drew inspiration from Gentry's Mississippi Delta roots. Most of its sound comes from Gentry, who played almost every instrument on its tracks, including piano, guitar, banjo, bass, and vibes. Nonetheless, Capitol's Kelly Gordon, producer of Gentry's first work for the label, also received the entire producing credit for The Delta Sweete. The album earned Gentry two more entries on the Billboard Hot 100. "Okolona River Bottom Band" peaked at number 54, while her cover of "Louisiana Man" made it to number 100. Although the album failed to match the success of its predecessor, only reaching number 132 on the Billboard 200, critics have called it one of the unacclaimed masterpieces of the 1960s.

Following The Delta Sweete, Capitol released Gentry's third album, Local Gentry, in August 1968. It failed to appear on any of the Billboard album charts but did peak at number 83 on the Cashbox Top 100 Albums chart.

In September, one month after the release of Local Gentry, her third album of 1968 came out. Bobbie Gentry and Glen Campbell features duets with label mate Glen Campbell. The album peaked at number 11 on the Billboard Top LPs chart and number one on the Top Country LPs chart. It was also certified Gold by the RIAA and earned Gentry and Campbell the Academy of Country Music award for Album of the Year. Gentry was also nominated for Top Female Vocalist.

=== Bobbie Gentry TV series ===
In 1968, Gentry was invited to host her own variety show on BBC Two in the UK, making her the first female songwriter to front a series on the channel. The initial six episodes of Bobbie Gentry were broadcast weekly from July 13 to August 17, 1968. It featured musicians from the Mississippi countryside as well as guests such as Donovan, the Hollies, Glen Campbell, James Taylor, Randy Newman, Elton John, Alan Price, Billy Preston, and Pan's People. Two further, six-episode series were broadcast from June 18 to July 23, 1969, and February 1 to March 15, 1971.

The series was produced and directed by Stanley Dorfman, who was engaged to be married to Gentry in 1970, and credited Gentry as his co-director. Dorfman told author Tara Murtha, "After a few episodes, she was pretty much co-directing the show because she had such great ideas. [But] the BBC wouldn't have it, wouldn't have an artist credited as a director or producer, so the credit went to me as producer and director. But she definitely contributed as much as I did creatively to the show. She was just full of ideas." John Cameron, the music arranger for her BBC shows noted, "She was pretty much the alpha female in the group – [producer] Stanley Dorfman's assistant Kate and choreographer Flick Colby were the only other prominent females in the crew. She certainly didn't have a support group like Dusty [Springfield]. "The series garnered widespread recognition and was syndicated globally.

All but five of the 18 episodes were wiped by the BBC, and those surviving were rebroadcast for the first time in November 2023 on BBC Four.

From 1968 to 1971, while in the UK recording her own series, Gentry made guest appearances on other BBC shows. These included a one-hour special for the In Concert series, broadcast on October 30, 1970; and Glen Campbell's own BBC Two special, broadcast May 6, 1970.

=== 1969: Touch 'Em with Love ===
Gentry's fifth album, Touch 'Em with Love, came out in July 1969. It marked a transition in her career. In an attempt to rebrand Gentry as a blue-eyed soul singer, it featured fewer self-penned regional songs and more systematically chosen cover songs. Recorded in Nashville and produced by Kelso Herston, the album's 10 tracks included two originals. The title track was released as the first single, but it failed to go above number 113 on Billboard's Bubbling Under the Hot 100 chart and only reached number 164 on the Billboard 200. Gentry's cover of "I'll Never Fall in Love Again" was released as the second single in the UK, where it became a number-one hit on the UK Singles Chart. The album reached number 21 on the UK Albums Chart.

In 1969, Gentry taped four television specials for Canadian television station CFTO-TV Toronto for North American syndication.

=== 1970: Fancy ===
April 1970 had the release of Fancy, Gentry's sixth album in three years. Like 1969's Touch 'Em with Love, it contains only covers, except for the artist's self-penned title track. Most of the album was recorded at Fame Recording Studios in Muscle Shoals, Alabama, with producer Rick Hall. "Fancy", released as the album's first single, became Gentry's biggest hit since "Ode to Billie Joe", peaking within the top 40 in the US, Canada, and Australia. Of the song, Gentry herself said, "'Fancy' is my strongest statement for women's lib, if you really listen to it. I agree wholeheartedly with that movement and all the serious issues that [it stands] for—equality, equal pay, day care centers, and abortion rights," she explained to After Dark in 1974.

The album's first European single, a cover of "Raindrops Keep Falling on My Head", peaked at number 40. The album's second North American single, "He Made a Woman Out of Me", did not reach the same heights as "Fancy", reaching only number 71 on the Billboard Hot 100.

Gentry was nominated for Best Contemporary Vocal Performance, Female at the 13th Annual Grammy Awards.

=== 1971–1974: Patchwork and departure from Capitol ===
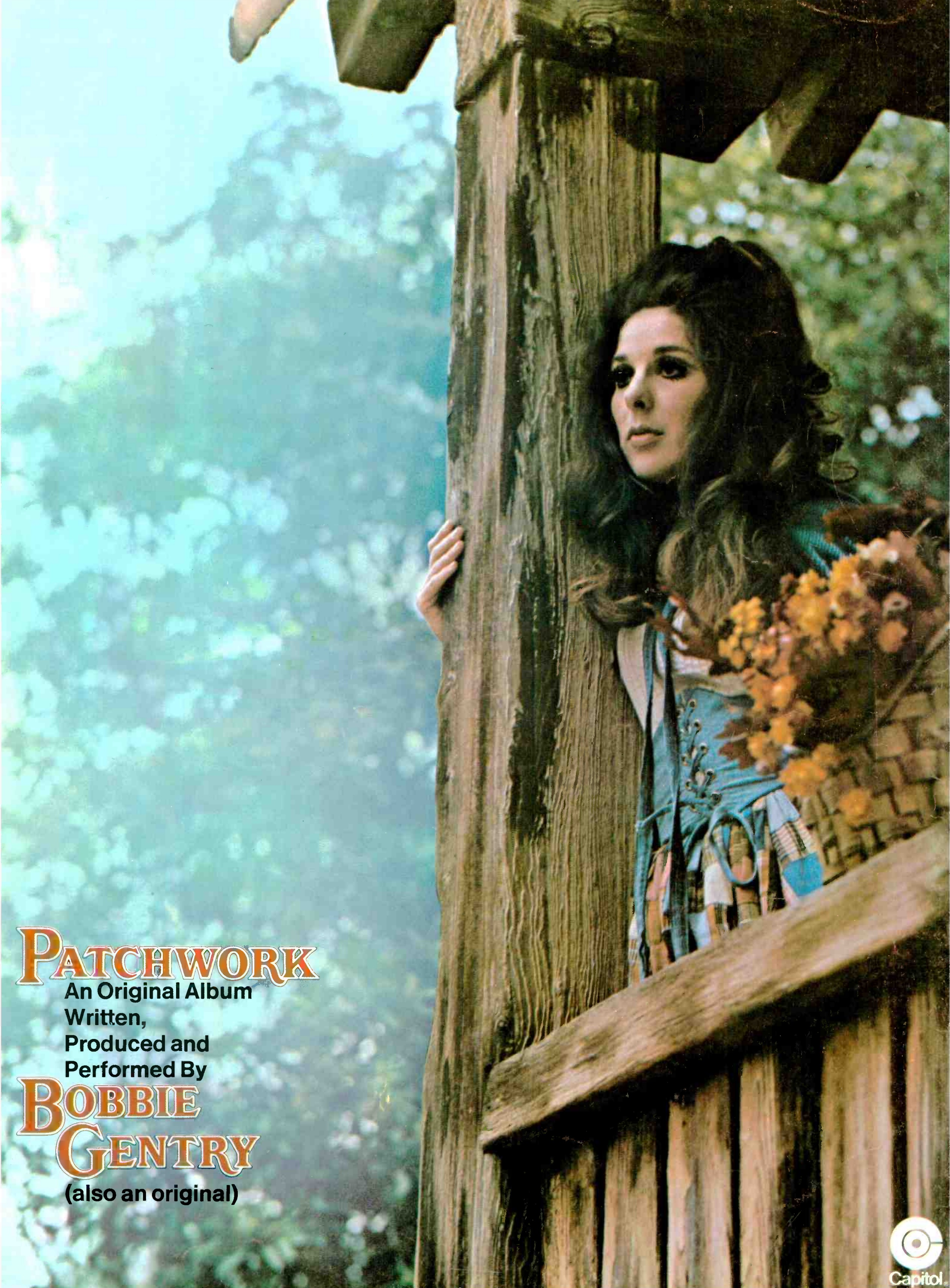
Billboard advertisement, May 8, 1971

Gentry released Patchwork in April 1971. It has been described as a collection of short stories in song, ranging from country and pop to blues, stitched together with cinematic interludes to form a cohesive whole. Patchwork was Gentry's first entirely self-written and -produced album. Its first single, "But I Can't Get Back", was a small hit, peaking at number 37 on the Billboard Top 40 Easy Listening chart and number 93 in Canada. Gentry released one more single for Capitol in August 1972, "The Girl from Cincinnati".

Around the time Patchwork was released, the entire executive board that had been at Capitol throughout Gentry's career was fired. A major restructuring at Capitol took place as parent company EMI tried to seize back control and rekindle the label's dwindling profits. This saw the artist roster slashed from 247 to 81 alongside extensive cuts to production and marketing budgets. With none of the executive board left who had known and worked with her, negotiations stalled over the renewal terms of Gentry's contract, and this failure to reach an agreement with Capitol created a stalemate. Since Gentry was unwilling to release an album with Capitol on the terms offered, she found herself unable to release an album on another label, meaning she was left with no choice but to wait out the remaining option period of her contract.

In 1974, she hosted a summer-replacement variety show on CBS called The Bobbie Gentry Happiness Hour. The show, which was her version of Glen Campbell's hit series The Glen Campbell Goodtime Hour, was not renewed for a full season.

=== 1975–1977: Post-Capitol recordings ===
In 1975, Gentry wrote and performed "Another Place, Another Time" for writer-director Max Baer, Jr.'s film Macon County Line. Following the film's success, the song was released on a promotional 7-inch single. In 1976, Baer directed the feature film Ode to Billy Joe, based on Gentry's hit song and starring Robby Benson and Glynnis O'Connor. In the movie, the mystery of the title character's suicide is revealed as a part of the conflict between his love for Bobbie Lee Hartley and a drunken homosexual experience. Warner Bros. Records released a soundtrack of the score by Michel Legrand, including a re-recorded version of "Ode to Billie Joe", retitled "Ode to Billy Joe" to match the film's title, with Gentry stating that the original spelling was an error. Warner Bros. released the new version as a single and Capitol re-released the original version, which gave Gentry two concurrent chart placings with the same song. The re-recording went on to be Gentry's last single to chart, meaning that her first and last chart entries are the same song.

In 1977, Gentry reunited with producer Rick Hall in Muscle Shoals to record an album for the Curb Records division of Warner Bros. Records (unlike Gentry's 1969 Fancy album, Gentry's 1977 recording sessions with Hall were not at his FAME Studios, but at the nearby Music Mill Studio). After an advance single, "Steal Away", had an unsuccessful February 1978 release, the album was shelved. "Steal Away" — a remake of the 1964 Jimmy Hughes hit, which had inaugurated FAME Studios' hit streak — had as its B-side the Patti Dahlstrom composition "He Did Me Wrong, But He Did It Right"; these tracks plus three additional tracks from Gentry's 1977 recording sessions, "Slow Cookin'" (written by Abby Marable), "Sweet Country" (written by Gentry), and "Thunder in the Afternoon" (written by Mac Davis, Rita Grimm and Yvonne Norman), were released on the 1992 European compilation album Ode to Billie Joe.

=== 1978–1982: Final projects before retirement ===
Gentry appeared as a guest on The Tonight Show Starring Johnny Carson on Christmas Day 1978. She attended the Best of Vegas Awards on March 21, 1980.

On May 10, 1981, Gentry was one of many celebrity guests to take part in An All-Star Salute to Mother's Day. During the television special, she performed "Mama, a Rainbow" from the musical Minnie's Boys for her mother, who was seated in the audience. This was Gentry's final public performance.

The last time Gentry appeared in public was when she attended the Academy of Country Music Awards on April 30, 1982. Since that time, she has not recorded, performed, nor been interviewed. One 2016 news report stated that Gentry lived in a gated community near Memphis, Tennessee. According to another report the same year, Gentry lived in a gated community in Los Angeles.

== Awards and nominations ==
| Award | Year | Nominee/work | Category | Result | Ref. |
|---|---|---|---|---|---|
| Academy of Country Music Awards | 1967 | Bobbie Gentry | Most Promising Female Vocalist | Won | |
| Academy of Country Music Awards | 1967 | "Ode to Billie Joe" | Single Record of the Year | Nominated | |
| Academy of Country Music Awards | 1967 | "Ode to Billie Joe" | Song of the Year | Nominated | |
| Academy of Country Music Awards | 1968 | Bobbie Gentry | Top Female Vocalist | Nominated | |
| Academy of Country Music Awards | 1968 | Bobbie Gentry and Glen Campbell | Album of the Year | Won | |
| Academy of Country Music Awards | 1969 | Bobbie Gentry | Top Female Vocalist | Nominated | |
| Academy of Country Music Awards | 1970 | Bobbie Gentry | Top Female Vocalist | Nominated | |
| Country Music Association Awards | 1967 | "Ode to Billie Joe" | Single of the Year | Nominated | |
| Country Music Association Awards | 1967 | "Ode to Billie Joe" | Song of the Year | Nominated | |
| Country Music Association Awards | 1969 | Glen Campbell and Bobbie Gentry | Vocal Group of the Year | Nominated | |
| Grammy Awards | 1967 | Bobbie Gentry | Best New Artist | Won | |
| Grammy Awards | 1967 | Ode to Billie Joe | Album of the Year | Nominated | |
| Grammy Awards | 1967 | Ode to Billie Joe | Best Contemporary Album | Nominated | |
| Grammy Awards | 1967 | "Ode to Billie Joe" | Best Contemporary Female Solo Vocal Performance | Won | |
| Grammy Awards | 1967 | "Ode to Billie Joe" | Best Contemporary Single | Nominated | |
| Grammy Awards | 1967 | "Ode to Billie Joe" | Best Vocal Performance, Female | Won | |
| Grammy Awards | 1967 | "Ode to Billie Joe" | Record of the Year | Nominated | |
| Grammy Awards | 1967 | "Ode to Billie Joe" | Song of the Year | Nominated | |
| Grammy Awards | 1970 | "Fancy" | Best Contemporary Vocal Performance, Female | Nominated | |

== Personal life ==
Gentry married casino magnate Bill Harrah on December 18, 1969. The couple divorced April 16, 1970.

On May 16, 1970, it was announced that Gentry was engaged to be married to Stanley Dorfman, the producer and director of her BBC television series Bobbie Gentry.

She married Thomas R. Toutant on August 17, 1976, and she divorced him on August 1, 1978.

On October 15, 1978, Gentry married singer and comedian Jim Stafford with whom she had a son, Tyler Gentry Stafford. Gentry and Stafford divorced in September 1980.

Gentry had partial ownership of the Phoenix Suns NBA team from the team's inception in 1968 until 1987.

== Legacy ==
Gentry charted 11 singles on the Billboard Hot 100, 10 in Canada, and four singles in the top 40 of the UK Singles Chart.

Beth Orton recorded a song titled "Bobby Gentry" featured on her The Other Side of Daybreak album. Jill Sobule recorded "Where Is Bobbie Gentry?" for her album California Years. Gentry's 1969 composition "Fancy" provided a top-10 country hit for Reba McEntire in 1991.

In 2011, producer and singer Joe Henry said Gentry's writing influenced him early in his life.

In September 2018, an eight-disc box set, titled The Girl from Chickasaw County: The Complete Capitol Masters, featuring all of Gentry's recordings for Capitol, was released.

In February 2019, Mercury Rev released Bobbie Gentry's the Delta Sweete Revisited, which was called a "reimagining of Bobbie Gentry's forgotten masterpiece".

In 2020, she was inducted into the Nashville Songwriters Hall of Fame.

== Discography ==
- Ode to Billie Joe (1967)
- The Delta Sweete (1968)
- Local Gentry (1968)
- Bobbie Gentry and Glen Campbell (with Glen Campbell) (1968)
- Touch 'Em with Love (1969)
- Fancy (1970)
- Patchwork (1971)

== Filmography ==
=== Television ===
| Year | Title | Performance(s) | Notes |
|---|---|---|---|
| 1967 | The Carol Burnett Show | "The Look of Love" | Guest-starring Phyllis Diller, Bobbie Gentry, and Gwen Verdon |
| 1968 | The Carol Burnett Show | "Sweet Peony" "Little Green Apples" (with George Gobel) | Guest-starring Bobbie Gentry and George Gobel |
| 1969 | The Carol Burnett Show | "Fancy" | Guest-starring Bobbie Gentry and Scoey Mitchell |
