= Local Gentry =

Studio album by Bobbie Gentry
- Released: August 26, 1968
- Recorded: May 10–July 20, 1968
- Studio: Capitol Recording Studio (Hollywood); EMI Studios (London)
- Genre: Country pop
- Length: 33:23
- Label: Capitol
- Producer: Kelly Gordon

Bobbie Gentry chronology
The Delta Sweete (1968)	Local Gentry (1968)	Bobbie Gentry and Glen Campbell (1968)

Singles from Local Gentry
- 1. "Sweete Peony" Released: September 30, 1968; 2. "The Fool on the Hill" Released: October 25, 1968

Local Gentry is the third studio album by American singer-songwriter Bobbie Gentry. It was released on August 26, 1968, by Capitol Records. The album was produced by Kelly Gordon.

== Background ==
Following the release of her second studio album, The Delta Sweete, Gentry embarked on The Bobbie Gentry Show, a 10-date concert tour of the United States, in the spring of 1968. It was her first tour with a full band, choreography, and costumes, setting the scene for her future stage productions. Gentry made her Las Vegas debut in August when Howard Hughes booked her at the Circus Maximus Theatre at Caesar's Palace. During these performances Gentry was joined onstage by her sisters, Jesse' Lizabeth and Linda, who were billed as the Local Gentry. The residency was such a success that it was transferred to lake Tahoe in September and would return to Casear's Palace in November.

== Recording ==
The album was recorded from May to July 1968. The first two tracks to be recorded were "Peaceful" and "Here, There and Everywhere" on May 10. "Come Away, Melinda", "Papa's Medicine Show", and "Eleanor Rigby" were recorded on May 13, 14, and 15, respectively, with the latter two titles being overdubbed on May 29. "Sweete Peony", "Ace Insurance Man", and "Sittin' Pretty" were recorded in June at EMI Studios in London, during sessions booked around Gentry's filming schedule for her first BBC series. The album was completed back in the United States on July 20 when "Casket Vignette", "The Fool on the Hill", and "Recollection" were recorded.

== Content ==
The album is a departure from Gentry's previous albums which were almost entirely self-penned. She only composed five of the album's eleven tracks. Among the remaining six tracks, three are Beatles covers. The album is more pop than her previous two albums, which featured more regional music, specifically country.

The albums opens with the sinister eroticism of the Gentry-penned "Sweete Peony". The second track, "Casket Vignette", is a commentary on the funeral parlor business and was composed by Gentry on a plane. "Come Away, Melinda" is a cover of a popular anti-war song. This is followed by the album's first Beatles cover, "The Fool on the Hill". Track five is another cover, "Papa's Medicine Show". Side one closes with "Ace Insurance Man", a Gentry original showing the comical side of small town intrigue and gossip.

Side two opens with "Recollection", a Gentry original chronicling a young girl trying to come to terms with mortality. The chilled out "Sittin' Pretty" follows and was written by Gentry with producer Kelly Gordon. The album's second Beatles cover is "Eleanor Rigby"; with its story of small-town loneliness and death is the only Beatles cover that fits well with Gentry's own songwriting. Track ten is a cover of Kenny Rankin's "Peaceful". The album closes with the final Beatles cover, "Here, There and Everywhere" which features a gorgeous vocal from Gentry and a '60s lounge style arrangement.

== Title and artwork ==
The album's title, Local Gentry, refers to "well-born, genteel and well-bred people", sometimes referred to as "gentry." The album's cover art features a double exposure like Gentry's previous album, The Delta Sweete. This time it is a photo of Gentry in a red trouser suit and polka-dot shirt, which she designed herself, overlaid with drawings of the characters or "local gentry" from the songs on the album.

== Critical reception ==
Professional ratings
Review scores
Source	Rating
Allmusic	4/5 stars

Billboard’s review of the album, published in the issue dated September 7, 1968, said, "Bobbie (Billie Joe) Gentry deserts the Delta for Beatle land, including a stunning "Eleanor Rigby" as well as her own dusty Delta dramas. Mississippi melodies includes the self-penned "Sweete Peony" and "Ace Insurance Man", both sensitively set against the Beatles' "Here, There and Everywhere” and Kenny Rankin’s "Peaceful" – all with lush arrangements tuned in on the charts."

Cashbox published a review on September 7 also, which said, "Bobbie Gentry bids fair to reestablish herself on the best-seller charts with this sensitive album of song and story. The artist has written four of the eleven tunes on the set, including "Sweete Peony", "Casket Vignette", "Ace Insurance Man" and "Recollection". Miss Gentry's singing is particularly beautiful here, creating moods of haunting fragility."

A review from Record World said, "With a voice as soft as fur, Bobbie sings about the people who people her life. About half of the material is her own rich work. Other songs are "Come Away, Melinda", "Eleanor Rigby" and "Here, There and Everywhere"."

Jason Ankeny of All Music gave a positive review of the album, concluding that the album "is an exquisitely wrought collection of character studies steeped in the myth and lore of Southern culture -- from the funeral parlor director portrayed in "Casket Vignette" to the titular "Ace Insurance Man," Bobbie Gentry etches a series of revealing, well-observed narratives populated by folks both larger-than-life and small-time, adding up to something not unlike a country-pop Spoon River Anthology."

== Commercial performance ==
The album did not appear on any major music charts. The album's two singles, "Sweete Peony" and "The Fool on the Hill" also failed to chart.

== Reissues ==
In 2006, Australian label Raven Records released the album on CD for the first time, paired with 1968’s The Delta Sweete.

In 2007, the album was made available for digital download.

== Track listing ==
Original release (1968)

Side one
No.	Title	Writer(s)	Recording date	Length
1.	"Sweete Peony"	Bobbie Gentry	June 1968	2:26
2.	"Casket Vignette"	Gentry	July 20, 1968	2:34
3.	"Come Away Melinda"	Fran Minkoff, Fred Hellerman	May 13, 1968	3:21
4.	"The Fool on the Hill"	John Lennon, Paul McCartney	July 20, 1968	3:44
5.	"Papa's Medicine Show"	Jamie Horton	May 14, 1968	3:50
6.	"Ace Insurance Man"	Gentry	June 1968	3:33

Side two
No.	Title	Writer(s)	Recording date	Length
1.	"Recollection"	Gentry	July 20, 1968	2:20
2.	"Sittin' Pretty"	Gentry, Kelly Gordon	June 1968	3:19
3.	"Eleanor Rigby"	Lennon, McCartney	May 15, 1968	2:27
4.	"Peaceful"	Kenny Rankin	May 10, 1968	2:51
5.	"Here, There and Everywhere"	Lennon, McCartney	May 10, 1968	2:28

Sittin' Pretty (1971)

Cover art of the 1971 Sittin' Pretty release.

Side one
No.	Title	Writer(s)	Length
1.	"Sweete Peony"	Bobbie Gentry	2:26
2.	"Casket Vignette"	Gentry	2:34
3.	"The Fool on the Hill"	John Lennon, Paul McCartney	3:44
4.	"Papa's Medicine Show"	Jamie Horton	3:50
5.	"Ace Insurance Man"	Gentry	3:33

Side two
No.	Title	Writer(s)	Length
1.	"Recollection"	Gentry	2:20
2.	"Sittin' Pretty"	Gentry, Kelly Gordon	3:19
3.	"Eleanor Rigby"	Lennon, McCartney	2:27
4.	"Peaceful"	Kenny Rankin	2:51
5.	"Here, There and Everywhere"	Lennon, McCartney	2:28

== Personnel ==
Adapted from the album liner notes.

- Perry Botkin - arrangements, conductor
- Dan Davis - liner notes
- Bobbie Gentry - vocals
- Kelly Gordon - producer
- Shorty Rogers - arrangements, conductor
