= The Culpepper Cattle Co. =

1972 film by Dick Richards

- Theatrical release poster
- Directed by: Dick Richards
- Screenplay by: Eric Bercovici; Gregory Prentiss
- Story by: Dick Richards
- Produced by: Paul Helmick
- Starring: Gary Grimes; Billy Green Bush; Geoffrey Lewis; Bo Hopkins; John McLiam; Luke Askew; Wayne Sutherlin; Raymond Guth; Matt Clark; Anthony James
- Cinematography: Lawrence Edward Williams; Ralph Woolsey
- Edited by: John F. Burnett
- Music by: Tom Scott
- Color process: DeLuxe Color
- Distributed by: 20th Century-Fox
- Release date: April 16, 1972
- Running time: 92 minutes
- Country: United States
- Language: English
- Budget: $1 million
- Box office: $1.25 million (US/Canada)

The Culpepper Cattle Co. or Dust, Sweat and Gunpowder (Australian title) is a 1972 American revisionist Western film produced by Twentieth Century Fox. It was directed by Dick Richards and starred Billy Green Bush as Frank Culpepper and Gary Grimes as Ben Mockridge. This was the first credited film for Jerry Bruckheimer, for which he received an associate producer credit. Its tagline is "How many men do you have to kill before you become the great American cowboy?" and also "The boy from Summer of '42 becomes a man on the cattle drive of 1866", which references a similar coming of age film starring Grimes. The film is typical of the "hyper-realism" of many early 1970s revisionist westerns. It is particularly noted for its grainy photography and use of sepia toning in some scenes.

== Plot ==
Ben Mockridge is a young man proud of his $4 handgun - which he flourishes for a friend he recently wagon-raced against -, and enamored of "cowboyin'". He asks Frank Culpepper if he can join his cattle drive to Fort Lewis, Colorado. Culpepper (a reformed gunslinger) reluctantly agrees and sends Ben to the cook to be his "little Mary". Ben bids farewell to his mother, who tells him to be a good boy. Ben discovers the adults have little interest in young'ns. Culpepper nevertheless assigns Ben tasks the greenhorn handles poorly, causing serious trouble.

After rustlers stampede the herd, Culpepper tracks them to a box canyon. When the rustlers' leader demands 50 cents a head for having rounded up the cattle, Culpepper and his hands kill the rustlers, not hesitating to gun down disarmed men, or repeatedly shoot anyone still moving. They lose four of their own.

Culpepper directs Ben to a cantina a day's ride off, to find Russ Caldwell. Before he can reach it, Ben is accosted by trappers who take his horse and gun. Once Ben finds Caldwell, he and three of his buddies agree to join the drive. When they cross the trappers' path, they immediately kill the trappers and take their possessions. When Ben stands night watch, a one-eyed man distracts him with talk, and Ben doesn't shoot him. Another thief overcomes Ben, and the horses are stolen. Culpepper is outraged at Ben's stupidity.

The horse theft "tears it", and Culpepper decides to toss Ben on a stage coach. When Culpepper enters a town, hoping to buy horses, they stop at a saloon, where Ben recognizes a patron as the one-eyed horse thief. Another shootout ensues, with Ben "redeeming" himself by killing the bartender, who reaches for his shotgun. Culpepper's adversaries die, one survivor directing Culpepper to the horses.

Ben handles Caldwell's gun sans permission, and the touchy Caldwell knocks Ben to the ground. When a ranch hand calls Caldwell an SOB, Caldwell demands a gunfight to reclaim "honor". The hand decides it unworthy of trouble and leaves the drive. "You cost me a good man, boy," fumes Culpepper, warning him to "make himself small".

In a grassy, wet area, Culpepper leaves the cattle to graze, going into town to look for the landowner to pay him. Ben follows them, to buy food for the cook, but joins them in a bar for a drink, where they prod him into a session with a backroom prostitute, although they merely bounce on the bed, clothed, squeaking the springs. The landowner, Thornton Pierce, tells Culpepper he should've asked first before letting cattle graze, and demands $200 as down-payment for trespassing. This time, Culpepper & Co. are outgunned, and angrily forced to surrender their sidearms.

Moving out the cattle, Culpepper encounters a group of religious "pilgrims", led by Nathaniel Green, who invites them to stay and water their cattle. He says God has led his party here, and they intend to settle. Not surprisingly, Pierce and thugs show up, claiming "this land is mine", and gives everyone, Green included, an hour to leave. Green is convinced Culpepper was sent by God to help. Culpepper responds that Green need only leave to be safe, which is what he intends to do, as it is less than two weeks to Fort Lewis and selling his cattle.

Ben decides to stay, feeling he can somehow help. He reveals he safely hid his gun during the barroom ambush. As Culpepper rides off, Caldwell and his three friends, their consciences (and lust for revenge) getting the better of them, return to defend Green from Pierce, to Culpepper's exasperation. Nonetheless, Culpepper leaves them behind to drive his cattle. In the ensuing shootout, everyone in the Caldwell and Pierce parties except Ben is killed. Revealing his hypocrisy and ingratitude, Green tells Ben they are not going to stay after all, as the ground has been stained with blood. "God never intended us to stay—he was only testing us." An angry Ben forces them to bury the four bodies of his friends, then discards his gun and rides off to parts unknown.

== Cast ==
- Gary Grimes as Ben Mockridge
- Billy "Green" Bush as Frank Culpepper
- Luke Askew as Luke
- John McLiam as Thornton Pierce
- Bo Hopkins as Dixie Brick
- Royal Dano as Rustlers' Leader
- Geoffrey Lewis as Russ Caldwell
- Raymond Guth as Cook
- Wayne Sutherlin as Missoula
- Matt Clark as Pete
- Anthony James as Nathaniel Green
- Charles Martin Smith as Tim Slater
- Gregory Sierra as Thief
- Lu Shoemaker as Prostitute / "Former Virgin"

== Historical accuracy ==
The Culpepper Cattle Co. has been praised for its attention to detail and period atmosphere. A subtle example is seen when Frank Culpepper (Billy Green Bush) leans against a water barrel and his arm above the wrist is exposed—it is white, untanned. People rarely took off any clothing in public (there is a comic moment when the cook is embarrassed to be seen with his shirt off), and the idea of an "all-over" tan would have been absurd, if not incomprehensible as only working folk had a tan. Cowboys were "fish-belly white" over most of their bodies.

The opening title sequence mixes genuine period photographs with sepia-tinted posed images of the cast members.

The story is almost violent, but this has to be seen in the context of the offenses against Frank Culpepper and his party. These included horse and cattle theft, which were usually punishable by hanging. As there was no practical way to haul the thieves into court, Culpepper was justified in dispensing immediate "justice", however brutal. Culpepper's final act of justice is to wipe out the evil agro-capitalist Thornton Pierce (John McLiam), the archetypical villain in scores of Westerns, and his horde.

By contemporary standards, the grass-fed cattle are rather scrawny, as fattening them up on corn had not become general practice. Even if it had, there would have been little point in adding weight to animals who would only "walk it off" on a long drive. The 1866 date of the story is plausible. This was the same year Charles Goodnight and Oliver Loving made their first long cattle drive.

The film's principal anachronism is showing most of the cowhands with beards. Contemporary photos indicate that, while cowboys often had mustaches (sometimes quite fancy), beards were not common—one out of twenty cowboys, perhaps. This was unusual in an era (extending to the end of the 19th century) where a high percentage of men took pride in having full beards.

The film incorrectly mixes in scenes of topography and vegetation found only in the climatic zone of southwestern Arizona. The location of the cattle drive is between "Texas" and Fort Lewis, Colorado (located in southwest Colorado near Durango). There are scenes of cattle being driven by Saguaro cactus which only occur in the Sonoran Desert of southwest Arizona. This Arizona scenery is 350 miles off-course of a probable route that would run between west Texas and southwest Colorado. The scenery surrounding the Eaves Movie Ranch (outside Santa Fe, New Mexico) is typical of the landscape and vegetation that would have been common along the fictional route.

The firearms used are almost all anachronisms in an 1866 setting. With the exception of Ben Mockridge (Gary Grimes)'s 1850s-era percussion-cap pistol, the other pistols and rifles date from the early 1870s to the mid-1890s. Another anachronism is a pressure lantern (invented in the late 1890s) visible in one bar scene.

== Awards ==
Gregory Prentiss and Eric Bercovici were nominated for the Writers Guild of America Award for Best Original Screenplay at the 25th Writers Guild of America Awards.

== See also ==
- List of American films of 1972
