= Anthony Harvey =

British actor and director (1930–2017)

- Born: 3 June 1930; London, England
- Died: 23 November 2017 (aged 87); Water Mill, New York, U.S.
- Occupations: director film editor
- Years active: 1950–1994

Anthony Harvey (3 June 1930 – 23 November 2017) was an English filmmaker who began his career as a teenage actor, was a film editor in the 1950s, and moved into directing in the mid-1960s. Harvey had fifteen film credits as an editor, and he directed thirteen films, the second of which, The Lion in Winter (1968), earned him a nomination for the Academy Award for Best Director. Harvey's career is also notable for his recurring work with a number of leading actors and directors including Terry-Thomas, Peter Sellers, Katharine Hepburn, Peter O'Toole, Richard Attenborough, Liv Ullmann, Sam Waterston, Nick Nolte, the Boulting Brothers, Anthony Asquith, Bryan Forbes and Stanley Kubrick. He died in November 2017 at the age of 87.

== Biography ==
Harvey was born in London in 1930. His father died when he was young and he was raised and took his name from his stepfather, actor and writer Morris Harvey. He began his screen career as an actor while a teenager and made his first film appearance playing Ptolemy, the younger brother of Cleopatra (played by Vivien Leigh, an acquaintance of his step-father) in the film version of George Bernard Shaw's Caesar and Cleopatra (1945), where he recalled that he was "looked after" by star Claude Rains. Harvey gained a scholarship to study at the Royal Academy of Dramatic Art but, although he worked for a time in repertory theatre, realised that he was not likely to be successful as an actor and decided to move into film-making.

=== Career as film editor ===
Harvey was taken on as an assistant editor by the Boulting Brothers (Roy Boulting and John Boulting). He soon found himself in high demand, and went on to edit a sequence of British films in the 1950s and early 1960s, developing fruitful working relationships with several major directors of the period including Anthony Asquith, Roy and John Boulting, Bryan Forbes, Martin Ritt, and UK-based American director Stanley Kubrick.

Harvey's first film as editor was the Anthony Asquith short On Such A Night (1956), followed by his first feature assignment, the Ealing war comedy Private's Progress (also 1956), starring Richard Attenborough and Terry-Thomas. His subsequent work as an editor included Roy Boulting's comedies Brothers in Law (1957) and Happy Is the Bride (1958), the drama Tread Softly Stranger (1958) directed by Gordon Parry, the political comedy Carlton-Browne of the F.O. (aka The Man in the Cocked Hat, 1959), and I'm All Right Jack (also 1959). Harvey edited the industrial drama The Angry Silence (1960), directed by Guy Green, and the Anthony Asquith comedy The Millionairess (also 1960), which starred Peter Sellers and Sophia Loren.

Harvey worked with both Bryan Forbes and Stanley Kubrick, editing Forbes' drama The L-Shaped Room and Kubrick's adaptation of Nabokov's Lolita (both 1962). His collaboration with Stanley Kubrick began after Harvey called Kubrick up out of the blue and asked if they could work together. After Lolita, he worked with Kubrick again on Dr. Strangelove (1964). This was followed by the spy thriller The Spy Who Came in from the Cold (1965), directed by Martin Ritt from the John le Carré novel.

In a 2014 conversation with broadcaster Walker Vreeland, Harvey recalled his working relationship with Kubrick:

Every moment I spent with him, I never learned so much about movies. He said that when you have a close-up and you have two wonderful actors, don't go backward and forward, leave the actor that was marvellous and stay on that shot. It's a much better way of putting a film together.

We had a great friendship. He used to sack me every now and then and say, 'Go home and don't come back!' But the next day, [it was] 'Hello, Tony, how are you?' It was a sort of joke. Because I was quite determined to put my stuff that I cut on the movie.

He said that I was becoming more impossible than Peter Sellers. He said, 'You'd better hurry up and direct, then you won't be so annoying in the cutting rooms.'

Harvey's last two credits as an editor were his own directorial debut Dutchman (1966) and The Whisperers (1967), his last collaboration with Bryan Forbes.

=== Career as director ===
Harvey's first feature film as a director was a monochrome short subject, the intense one-hour race relations drama Dutchman (1966), which depicts a fateful encounter between a black man and a white woman on the New York subway. Although it did not receive a wide release, it was nominated for the Golden Lion at the Venice Film Festival.

Actor Peter O'Toole was impressed by Harvey's work on Dutchman and brought it to the attention of the film's producer Joseph E. Levine. O'Toole advocated that Harvey should direct the screen adaptation of James Goldman's play The Lion In Winter (1966). Harvey gained the respect and consent of the film's other star, Katharine Hepburn, leading to her third Oscar and a lifelong friendship. "Much as I absolutely worshipped her work, I sometimes thought she rather overdid it," Harvey recalled. "So I said, 'Kate when you're simple, you're devastating.' She was adorable about it". The film (1968) was a critical and commercial success and was nominated for seven Academy Awards including Best Picture; Hepburn won the Academy Award for Best Actress (with Barbra Streisand, the only time this has been a joint award) and Harvey was nominated for a Best Director Oscar and won Best Director at the Golden Globes, as well as several other major awards. It was the screen debuts for actors Anthony Hopkins and Timothy Dalton. Harvey later fondly recalled the deep familial rapport that developed among the cast, and considered the production among the best experiences of his career. However, "when you have success so early, everything after that is under great scrutiny. You wonder what the hell to do next", he once said. Harvey turned down the chance to direct both Love Story (1970) and Cabaret (1972). "I let them go out of total indecision," he said. "It was a terrible mistake".

Harvey's third directorial project was the ill-fated uncompleted film A Glimpse of Tiger (1970), an oddball romantic comedy about a pair of bohemian con-artists living in New York City. It was scripted (from his second novel) by writer Herman Raucher. The film rights to the project had been purchased by rising American star Elliott Gould, who was also producing, as part of a two-picture deal he had struck with Warner Brothers Pictures, but problems arose as soon as filming started. Gould's behaviour became bizarre and unpredictable (he was rumoured to be using drugs heavily), co-star Kim Darby reportedly became so afraid of Gould that she hired bodyguards to protect her from him, Gould repeatedly clashed with Harvey over his direction, and Gould later claimed that large sums of money were embezzled from the production and that he was threatened by armed men. As a result of the turmoil, when Gould failed to appear on set after an ultimatum from the studio, Warner Bros. shut the production down after just four days of shooting; Gould was then blacklisted by Hollywood, and his career languished for two years until he re-emerged in Robert Altman's The Long Goodbye (1973).

Harvey's next feature was an adaptation of another James Goldman play, the offbeat comedy-drama They Might Be Giants (1971) starring George C. Scott and Joanne Woodward, in which Scott plays Justin Playfair, a wealthy but eccentric retiree who is convinced that he is Sherlock Holmes. It was not a success, according to Harvey because Universal significantly altered the film's last half-hour.

Harvey reunited with Hepburn for the acclaimed made-for-TV adaptation of Tennessee Williams' The Glass Menagerie (1973) which also featured Sam Waterston and Michael Moriarty. His next film was the lavish historical drama The Abdication (1974) starring Liv Ullmann, about the abdication of Queen Christina of Sweden, which co-starred Peter Finch and featured a score by Nino Rota.

It was followed by a more modern period piece, The Disappearance of Aimee, starring Faye Dunaway and Bette Davis, which explored the mysterious 1926 temporary disappearance of American celebrity evangelist Aimee Semple McPherson.

Players (1979) was a romantic drama set in the world of international tennis, in which a rising tennis star (Dean Paul Martin) falls for an older woman (Ali MacGraw) who is engaged to a wealthy man (Maximilian Schell) whom she does not love. The film is also notable for appearances (as themselves) by a number of real-life tennis stars of the period including Pancho Gonzalez, Guillermo Vilas, John McEnroe and Ilie Nastase.

Harvey's next film was a Western drama, Eagle's Wing (1980) starring Martin Sheen, Harvey Keitel and Sam Waterston.

The following year Harvey reunited with Liv Ullmann for the romantic drama Richard's Things (which also featured British actress Amanda Redman) and in 1981 he directed the American sequences of The Patricia Neal Story, a tele-movie starring Glenda Jackson which detailed the real-life struggles faced by Oscar-winning actress Patricia Neal, who at the height of her career had a devastating stroke which left her unable to speak, and the efforts of her then-husband Roald Dahl (played by Dirk Bogarde) and their friends and family to help her recover.

Harvey directed another American tele-movie, Svengali (1983) which was based on the 1894 George du Maurier novel Trilby; it starred Peter O'Toole as an ageing singer who discovers and nurtures a new talent (Jodie Foster) with whom he becomes romantically involved but whom he seeks to completely control.

Harvey's last cinema film was another offbeat black comedy, Grace Quigley (1984), which reunited him with Katharine Hepburn (making her final top-billed role in a feature film). The story concerns an elderly New York woman who witnesses a murder committed by a top hit-man (Nick Nolte), whom she then blackmails into killing some of her friends.

After a ten-year interval, Harvey returned to direct the romantic comedy television movie This Can't Be Love (1994). This was to be both Harvey's last film and the last of his four collaborations with Katharine Hepburn, and it was also the only time that Hepburn ever worked on screen with the film's co-star Anthony Quinn. The plot concerns the romantic travails of a former glamour movie-star couple who had a brief, stormy marriage in the 1940s, who reunite decades later to find that their relationship is as difficult as ever. Harvey though remained in Hepburn's high regard, and was one of the few colleagues she remained in contact with near the end of her life. "A real English gentleman and a brilliant director, one of the best I've ever worked with", she told Ronald Bergan in 2001.

In 2014 Harvey told Walker Vreeland that he decided to stop making films after the producers interfered in the making of This Can't Be Love:

I'll tell you exactly why I stopped. Because the people who were making the film, during the editing stage, told me they weren't quite happy with the pauses of Miss Hepburn. And they sent an editor - a very nice man - who was in ... the mail room, and he did a few snips on the Movieola - and I thought that was outrageous. I said, 'Do you know I cut so-and-so, and this and that, and 'Dr Strangelove', and I really don't want someone else fooling with my film. Those pauses with Kate Hepburn were very unique, so leave them alone ... '

... I felt even though one shouldn't get knocked out by what people say - you have to overlook it and on to the next one - I felt it was very strange to let a guy - a perfectly nice fellow in the office downstairs - to come and chip along on my film. I just thought it was unspeakable. And I tried to explain to the producers and they just laughed ... I just thought it was ridiculous, so I just went in and redid the whole schedule and they knew nothing about it. I just thought it was ridiculous.

Harvey moved to Long Island in the 1990s and he died there on 23 November 2017, aged 87.

== Awards ==
- Nominee, Best Director - Academy Awards (The Lion in Winter)
- Nominee, Best Director - Golden Globes (The Lion in Winter)
- Winner, Best Director - Directors Guild of America (The Lion in Winter)
- Nominee, Best Director-TV Movie - Directors Guild of America (The Glass Menagerie)
- Nominee, Golden Lion - Venice Film Festival (Dutchman)
- Nominee, Golden Lion - Venice Film Festival (Richard's Things)
- Nominee, Best Director-TV Movie - Directors Guild of America (The Patricia Neal Story)
- Nominee, Golden Hugo (Best Picture) - Chicago International Film Festival (Grace Quigley)

== Selected filmography ==
- A Glimpse of Tiger began production in 1971, before being abandoned.

=== Editing ===
The director of each film is indicated in parentheses.

- Private's Progress (Boulting, 1956)
- Tread Softly Stranger (Parry, 1958)
- I'm All Right Jack (Boulting, 1959)
- The Millionairess (Asquith, 1960)
- The Angry Silence (Green, 1960)
- The L-Shaped Room (Forbes, 1962)
- Lolita (Kubrick, 1962)
- Dr. Strangelove or: How I Learned to Stop Worrying and Love the Bomb (Kubrick, 1964)
- The Spy Who Came in from the Cold (Ritt, 1965)
- The Whisperers (Forbes, 1967)
- Dutchman (1967)

=== Directing ===
- Dutchman (1966)
- The Lion in Winter (1968)
- They Might Be Giants (1971)
- The Glass Menagerie (1973, TV)
- The Abdication (1974)
- The Disappearance of Aimee (1976, TV)
- Eagle's Wing (1979)
- Players (1979)
- Richard's Things (1980)
- Svengali (1983, TV)
- Grace Quigley (1985)
- This Can't Be Love (1994, TV)

== See also ==
- List of Academy Award winners and nominees from Great Britain
