= Summer of '42 (book) =

1971 novelization of screenplay

- Putnam 1971 hardcover
- Author: Herman Raucher
- Language: English
- Genre: Drama
- Publisher: Putnam Publishing Group
- Publication date: 1 June 1971
- Publication place: United States
- ISBN: 0399107770 (first hardcover ed.)

Summer of '42 is a novel written by Herman Raucher, based upon his screenplay and personal experience.

In a 2002 TCPalm interview, Herman Raucher mentions that the 1971 film of the same title gave birth to the book Summer of '42. Raucher wrote the screenplay for the 1971 film first. When the film was in post-production, someone told him to write the book about Summer of '42 to help publicize the picture. So Raucher wrote the book in about three or four weeks. The book became a bestseller prior to the film's release, so the film was publicized as "from Herman Raucher's national best seller."

Both the film and this book are based on the real incidents that happened during the summer of 1942 in Raucher's life. Raucher's novelization of the screenplay, with the dedication, "To those I love, past and present," serves more as the tribute to his friend Oscar Seltzer that he had intended the film to be, with the focus of the book being more on the two boys' relationship than Raucher's relationship with Dorothy. The book also mentions Seltzer's death, which is absent from the film adaptation.

== Differences between the book and the film version ==
There are differences between the real life incident that happened during the night and the incident in the film. The book stayed faithful to the real incident that happened during that night. In 2002 TCPalms Interview, Raucher pointed out that the real Dorothy was drinking heavily when he visited Dorothy during night time. This is implied in the book. But in the film, it is only implied that Dorothy "may" have been drinking. But when Dorothy appears to Hermie in the film, visually there is no indication of her being drunk at all. In the film, Dorothy is completely aware of what is going on. In both the real incident and in the book, the song that was played on the phonograph record was "That Old Feeling". In the film, the composer, Michel Legrand, wrote a new score for the dancing scene. The real life incident took place in Nantucket Island. But the name of the island is not mentioned in the film. In the book, the name of the island was changed to Patchett Island. In the real incident, the real Dorothy kept calling Hermie "Pete" thinking that Hermie was her husband while they both were in bed. There is no indication in the film that Dorothy is imagining Hermie as her husband Pete. In the book, it is only mentioned that Dorothy talked about private things that Hermie was not familiar with. Unlike the film, the book shows that the tears come out of Hermie's eyes while the music "That Old Feeling" is playing.

For the film, Raucher admitted about moving the order of certain events around and interchanging some dialogue. There are several differences between Dorothy in the book and Dorothy in the film. One of several changes is where Hermie's tongue gets hurt by the coffee. Both in the film and in the book, Dorothy helps Hermie by providing ice when Hermie's tongue gets hurt by the hot coffee. Unlike Dorothy in the book, Dorothy in the film repeatedly apologizes to Hermie for the coffee being too hot and makes sure that he is doing fine. In the film, Dorothy moves on to her work and also to a conversation "only" after she makes sure that Hermie's tongue is feeling better. But in the book, there is no indication of an apology from Dorothy. In the book, when Hermie was "able" to look up to see what Dorothy was doing after getting relief from the ice cubes in the coffee, he saw her sitting opposite to him and she was already eating one of the doughnuts and she was talking about her old 1934 stove.

== See also ==
- Summer of '42 (film)
