= Gary Grimes =

American actor

- Born: June 2, 1955 (age 70); San Francisco, California, U.S.
- Occupation: Actor
- Years active: 1967–1991

Gary Grimes (born June 2, 1955) is an American retired actor.

== Biography ==
Grimes was born in San Francisco, California. His uncle was actor Rudy Solari. Grimes' first major role was in the 1971 film Summer of '42, playing a teenager, based on author Herman Raucher, who has an affair with a beautiful older woman (Jennifer O'Neill). For the role, Grimes was nominated for a 1972 Golden Globe Award as Most Promising Newcomer, as well as the BAFTA Award as Most Promising Newcomer to Leading Film Roles. Grimes then starred in the sequel Class of '44 (1973), which followed his character to college.

Grimes' other film credits include Cahill U.S. Marshal (1973) alongside John Wayne, The Spikes Gang (1974) with Lee Marvin, Ron Howard, and Charles Martin Smith, and the cult Disney film Gus (1976), about a mule that kicks field goals. He was offered a TV series during that period but turned it down.

Grimes appeared in only six films and largely retired from acting in the late 1970s (except for an episode of Matt Houston in 1983). He still lives in Los Angeles and has remained out of public view since that time, working for a charitable organization. "I got to the point where the work wasn't up to the quality that I wanted," Grimes told American Profile magazine in 2011. "I'm very happy in my decision."

== Filmography ==
Film
Year	Film	Role	Other notes
1971	Summer of '42	Hermie	
1972	The Culpepper Cattle Co.	Ben Mockridge	
1973	Class of '44	Hermie	
1973	Cahill U.S. Marshal	Danny Cahill	
1974	The Spikes Gang	Will Young	
1976	Gus	Andy Petrovic	
1987	Concrete Angels	Beatles	(voice)
Television
Year	Title	Role	Notes
1967	Gunsmoke	Bede Roniger	Episode: Baker's Dozen
1970	The Brady Bunch	Boy at Door	Episode: Tiger! Tiger!
1970	My Three Sons	Student	Episode: You Can't Go Home
1971	Owen Marshall, Counselor at Law		Episode: The Baby Sitter
1976	Once an Eagle	Jack Devlin	NBC Miniseries
1983	Matt Houston	Buddy Young	Episode: The Purrfect Crime
1991	The Piglet Files	Gary	Episode: The Hunt for Red Decoder

== Award nominations ==
Year	Award	Result	Category	Series or film
1972	BAFTA Awards	Nominated	Most Promising Newcomer to Leading Film Roles	Summer of '42
1972	Golden Globe Awards	Nominated	Most Promising Male Newcomer	Summer of '42
