= A Glimpse of Tiger =

Book by Herman Raucher

- First edition
- Author: Herman Raucher
- Language: English
- Genre: Novel
- Publisher: Putnam
- Publication date: 1971
- Publication place: United States
- Media type: Print (hardcover)
- Pages: 223
- ISBN: 0-39910-340-6

A Glimpse of Tiger is a 1971 novel by Herman Raucher. It was his first original novel; his previous (and first) novel, Summer of '42, was based on his own screenplay of the same name, and written at the request of Warner Bros. Pictures as a means of promoting the film.

A Glimpse of Tiger tells the story of Tiger and Luther, a pair of young bohemian con artists living together in an apartment in New York City in 1971. The novel follows the archetype for a romantic comedy, but employs an original twist ending in its final chapter. Though the book became a best-seller, it never matched the success of Summer of '42, although it was embraced by critics. The Boston Globe dubbed it "A strange and moving tale with a shocker climax".

== Plot summary ==
In the late 1960s, 19-year-old Janice McAllister runs away from her home in Indianapolis after an argument with her parents about her future and comes to New York City, where she is taken in by Luther, a playful con artist and bohemian. Renaming Janice "Tiger," Luther becomes both her boyfriend and mentor, schooling her in the art of con games and petty crime. The two prove to be an effective pair and they successfully live from the food and money that they steal or con. As the story progresses, it becomes apparent that Luther is the beneficiary of an enormous trust fund set up by his wealthy parents, and that his lifestyle is a result of boredom rather than necessity.

Although the two enjoy one another's company, Tiger is constantly frustrated by Luther's habit of role playing multiple personas—including Dracula and a terrorist called "The Mad Bomber of London"—even when not engaging in con schemes, a habit she believes is an attempt to emotionally distance himself from her. Even after living with Luther for an extended period, Janice realizes she knows more about Luther's personas than she does him. Luther responds to her attempts at emotional intimacy by claiming he has no need to mature any further in life.

One afternoon, on a whim, Luther invites a pair of pornographers to move in with him and Janice so that they can focus on building a phone sex operation. One of them, a morbidly obese man named Chance, overdoses on drugs and nearly dies in their living room. The experience startles Janice enough to end her relationship with Luther.

At this point in the novel, the narration begins alternating between third-person accounts of Janice's life and italicized, first-person segments narrated by Luther, who appears to be steadily losing his mind. Luther's segments take the form of letters, journal entries, and even direct addresses to the reader, as he documents his attempts to win back Tiger's affections.

Tiger becomes a secretary at a law firm, where she befriends several of her coworkers and is briefly promoted to the personal assistant of a prominent attorney, who demotes her after she rebuffs his sexual advances. Luther, meanwhile, tries to convince Tiger to move back in with him; Luther's attempts at regaining Tiger's love take the form of a number of comic set pieces that take on more and more sinister undertones as the book progresses. In his first-person accounts, Luther indicates that the two pornographers have moved out of his apartment and that his electricity has been shut off, and he begins to obsess over his sudden tendency to wet the bed.

One of Janice's coworkers sets her up on a blind date with an optometrist. Although the date begins successfully, Luther shows up at the restaurant where they are having dinner, in character as one of his old personas, a Russian waiter. After refusing the manager's request to leave, Luther sparks a small riot after he begins rapidly switching personas and starts throwing patrons' food at them. Luther later wonders why he didn't simply leave the restaurant after being found out by the manager, per his grifter's code of always escaping a bad situation when caught. Deciding that he must really be part Russian, Luther travels to the Soviet embassy in New York City requesting asylum, but he is denied.

Tiger is promoted at work and continues to date the optometrist. Luther becomes more aggressive in his pursuit of Tiger, ultimately stalking her at work and breaking into her room at the YWCA. After catching Luther in her room one night, Tiger and Luther discuss their life philosophies; Luther sadly acknowledges that he and Janice are incompatible and agrees to leave her alone.

The next day, Luther phones Janice's office in his "Mad Bomber of London" persona, threatening to blow up the building. Although the rest of the staff evacuates the building, Tiger assures them that it's simply a prank and remains at her desk.

In his final address to the reader, Luther's narration deteriorates into incoherent rambling, rants against Christianity, and an anecdote about once breaking his nose on New Year's Eve.

Sitting at her desk, Janice has a sudden revelation and attempts to leave the building. Before she can, a bomb on her floor detonates, killing her and burning down the office. On the street, Luther watches the rubble burn and has a vision of finding a young Janice on the beach and taking her home.

== Film ==
The film rights were bought by Elliott Gould who produced the film to star himself as part of a two-picture deal with Warner Bros. However the movie was abandoned during shooting after only four days after rumours that Gould was on drugs. Gould later said he:

Frightened people on 'Tiger,' but only because of my character. I showed up with a six-day beard, a cigar butt in my mouth, and knee-length pea-coat on. Around my waist, I wore an American-flag scarf. I was a wild character, and I finally couldn't—or wouldn't—vacillate between the role of actor and producer. In a sense, I scuttled my own ship... [I was] sabotaged by people on my own payroll—cosmic embezzlers—who took and took and took and never gave back... I was threatened by men with weapons on my own movie set. I was forced to stay away. As a result of that, I couldn't work for nearly two years—I was blackballed... I was very unstable, but it wasn't drugs. Sure, I smoked grass and did psychedelics a little, but I was not a druggy or a crazy. Gimme a break—I was a lamb, unaware of the laws of the jungle. I was right at the end of six years of therapy when the roof fell in. Drugs? Just an excuse for people who didn't know or understand me.

A source close to the film later said in 1984:

Whether it was from drugs, or the influence of the young woman now his wife [Jennifer Bogart, 15 years his junior, whom Gould has married twice, in 1974 and 1978], or his friend Keith Carradine, who was always around, Elliott went crazy. Not crazy enough to commit, but enough to think he had such unbridled power he could rule the universe. When he found he couldn't, he got terribly paranoid. Frankly, there were a lot of drugged-out people walking the streets in those days, but Elliott hadn't seemed that way and was very successful, and more was coming fast. I think he was unable to stand success. He felt unworthy and unable to handle it, so he self-destructed.

Producer Paul Heller, a Warner Bros. executive on the set later said:

It was a shame—a delicious screenplay, perfect for Elliott, and it would've established him for years to come. But the truth is, he was in no kind of condition to make a film. As to why, I'm not equipped to say. Yes, Elliott did fire director Tony Harvey; there was great turmoil, and yes, there were finally security people there. Kim Darby was quite afraid of Elliott, so we hired several, as window dressing, to calm her. I remember sitting at the location in Central Park, waiting for Elliott to show. If he didn't, I had to shut the picture down. He didn't, and every phone booth in the area had had the wires cut.

It has been claimed that Warner Bros. reworked the idea into the film What's Up, Doc?, changing the lead from a male to a female and casting Barbra Streisand (Gould's ex-wife) and Ryan O'Neal. The film's director Peter Bogdanovich has minimized this, saying, "The only thing we took from A Glimpse of Tiger—and I don’t remember it very well—was the idea that the leading character had been to a lot of different colleges. He or she is very well-educated in a lot of different areas. And we put that into Barbra’s character."

Gould was unemployed for two years before making a comeback in The Long Goodbye (1973). In a 2014 oral history of A Glimpse of Tiger on Hidden Films, Gould explained that his main issues were with Anthony Harvey's "directing before I even show up," for instance, making decisions about his and Kim Darby's costumes without his consent. Several sources interviewed said that, in addition to Gould, then-couple David Carradine and Barbara Hershey, who were also briefly on set, were disruptive to the production and combative with Harvey. Harvey gave a very brief statement on the film, saying, "It's water under the bridge."
