= List of films featuring hallucinogens =

This is a list of films featuring hallucinogens.

== List of films ==
Film	Description	Hallucinogen featured	Year	Ref.
200 Motels	"Vile foamy liquids" (The movie also has special effects that are "psychedelic", i.e. designed with hallucinogens in mind.)		1971	
Altered States	Believing that altered states of consciousness are just as real as "normal" consciousness, a professor of abnormal psychology combines a hallucinogenic mixture with sensory deprivation and begins to "regress" into progressively earlier stages of evolution.	LSD, DMT, psilocybin	1980	
Apocalypse Now		LSD	1979	
Artificial Paradises			2012	
Awakening of the Beast			1970	
Barb and Star Go to Vista Del Mar	Barb, Star, and Edgar take pills containing an unknown substance that causes them to hallucinate.		2021	
Beavis and Butt-Head Do America	Beavis eats a peyote cactus in the desert, leading him to have hallucinations of being in a music video with his friend Butt-Head.	Peyote	1996	
Beyond the Valley of the Dolls	Following a psychedelic-fueled party at his house, Z-Man goes on a murderous rampage.	Peyote	1970	
Blue Sunshine		LSD	1978	
Blueberry		Ayahuasca	2004	
Brain Damage			1988	
Climax	A dance troupe's punch is spiked with LSD, causing those who drink it to respond with violence against themselves and others.	LSD	2018	
Crystal Fairy & the Magical Cactus	Jamie, a footloose and self-absorbed young American, is traveling in Chile and is keen to experience the mysteries of a local hallucinogen — the mescaline-bearing San Pedro cactus.	Mescaline (San Pedro cactus)	2013	
Dirty Pictures	A documentary about the psychedelic chemist Alexander Shulgin.	Various	2010	
The Doors		LSD, Peyote	1991	
Easy Rider		LSD	1969	
Embrace of the Serpent	The film tells two stories thirty years apart, both featuring Karamakate, an Amazonian shaman and last survivor of his tribe. He travels with two scientists, firstly with German Theodor Koch-Grunberg in 1909 and American Richard Evans Schultes in 1940, to look for the rare yakruna, a (fictional) sacred plant.		2015	
The Emerald Forest	Karamakate prolongs his life, blasting white powder called "the sun's semen", possibly 5-MeO-DMT (distinct from but very similar to normal DMT), collected in the form of resin from the Virola tree	5-MeO-DMT or bufotenin	1985	
Enter the Void		DMT, LSD	2009	
Fanboys	The Chief rescues the titular characters from a gay biker bar, then serves his own special guacamole dip recipe while promising to fix a flat tire on their van, causing each of them to have their own "Star Wars"-related hallucinations.	Peyote	2009	
Fast X	Han eats a "fun muffin" offered him by a tech guy, suddenly having some hallucinations.		2023	
Fear and Loathing in Las Vegas		LSD, mescaline	1998	
A Field in England		Psilocybin	2013	
Friend of the World	Once administered, the characters are unable to separate their hallucinations from reality.	Fictional toxic cure or miracle drug	2020	
Friendship	The protagonist licks a toad with psychedelic properties before hallucinating a trip to Subway, where he debates whether or not to toast his sandwich.	Toad	2024	
Good Time	After a bank robbery gone wrong, protagonist Connie Nikas does everything in his power to bail out and rescue his mentally handicapped brother from police custody while evading capture himself. Connie ends up breaking out a different convict "Ray" that happened to be in the same hospital as his brother, but uses this to his advantage. Connie follows Ray to a 12 fl oz Sprite bottle filled with liquid LSD stashed in an amusement park ride, which he plans to sell in order to get his brother's bail money. Noise resulting from their search for the LSD bottle causes a park security guard to investigate the ride and call the police. A fight ensues which ends with the guard unconscious and Connie taking his clothes to assume the identity of a security guard. For good measure Connie pours a mouthful of LSD down the guards throat so upon waking up, he appeared incomprehensible and was assumed to be the trespasser whom the 911 call was made for.	LSD	2017	
Horns	Protagonist Ig uses his supernatural powers to make Terry consume all the drugs he has at once.	Multiple	2013	
Hot Rod		LSD	2007	
I Drink Your Blood		LSD	1970	
I Love You, Alice B. Toklas			1968	
In the Name of the Father	Protagonist Gerry Conlon and his fellow prisoners get high by ingesting LSD off of jigsaw puzzle pieces soaked in LSD.	LSD	1993	
Mandy	The Children of the New Dawn cult and the Black Skulls motorcycle gang consume high-potency LSD prepared by "The Chemist".	LSD	2018	
The Matrix		Mescaline	1999	
Midnight Cowboy			1969	
Midsommar		Psilocybin	2019	
Naked Lunch	Protagonist William Lee is an exterminator, and his wife persuades him to try injecting his insecticide powder, pyrethrum (fictional as a drug), which is a "literary high". To stop that addiction, he tries a black powder made from a giant aquatic Brazilian centipede. Later, he is given some of the "black meat" that's made into a jelly. Finally, he gains access to a creature called a mugwump and then uses "mugwump jism" that is dispensed from stalks on the creature's head.	Pyrethrum or bug powder, black meat of the giant aquatic Brazilian centipede, mugwump jism. (All are fictional)	1991	
Natural Born Killers	Mickey and Mallory Knox eat magic mushrooms and get lost in the desert.	Psilocybin	1994	
Neighbours			1952	
Nightbreed			1990	
Once Upon a Time in Hollywood	The climactic scene involves Cliff Booth (Brad Pitt) smoking an acid-dipped cigarette.	LSD	2019	
Performance	An ex-hitman (Chas) hides from his former boss by moving in with an ex-rock star (Turner) and his two girlfriends. Chas begins to leave behind his hypermasculinity, and under the influence of the hallucinogenic mushroom Amanita muscaria he admits that he is relieved to be out of the gangster lifestyle. He begins exploring his bisexuality and dressing in more feminine clothing, including a wig.		1970	
The People Next Door		LSD, STP	1970	
The Possession of Michael King		DMT	2014	
The President's Analyst			1967	
Psych-Out		STP	1968	
A Scanner Darkly	Characters throughout the film use Substance D, a fictional drug that causes bizarre hallucinations.	Substance D (fictional)	2006	
The Serpent and the Rainbow			1988	
Seven Psychopaths	In this metacinema crime black comedy film, Marty Faranan is a struggling writer who dreams of finishing his screenplay, Seven Psychopaths. Marty's best friend, Billy (Rockwell), is an unemployed actor who makes a living by kidnapping dogs and collecting the owners' cash rewards for their safe return. His partner-in-crime, Hans Kieslowski – a religious man with a cancer-stricken wife - has a vision of his late wife telling him that there is no heaven and that she is just sitting in a completely grey room, which lets Hans doubt he believes in the afterlife.	Peyote	2012	
Shrooms	On a vacation in Ireland, a group of American students gather and eat psilocybin mushrooms. One of the group members accidentally ingests the wrong mushroom, a deathcap. She has a seizure and visions of her friends being murdered. As the trip continues, the group becomes separated and are murdered, apparently by an insane monk out of a ghost story from the area.	Psilocybin	2007	
Skidoo			1968	
SLC Punk!		LSD	1998	
Stripes		LSD	1981	
Taking Woodstock		LSD	2009	
Tenacious D in The Pick of Destiny		Psilocybin	2006	
The Royal Tenenbaums	Eli Cash (Owen Wilson) regularly partakes in mescaline.	Mescaline	2001	
The Trip		LSD	1967	
The Unbearable Weight of Massive Talent	Javi and Nic Cage take LSD.	LSD	2022	
The White Sound			2002	
Training Day		PCP	2001	
Young Guns	Billy the Kid and his gang ingest peyote in an attempt to consult with spirits regarding their present situation.	Peyote	1988	
Young Sherlock Holmes	A cult use a hallucinogenic drug to give their victims frightening visions and accidentally kill themselves when they panic.	Fictional drug	1985	
Dora and the Lost City of Gold	Dora and friends encounter hallucinogenic spores in the jungle that cause them to see animated versions of themselves.	Jungle Flower Spores	2019	

== See also ==
- List of drug films
- Stoner film
- List of psychedelic documentaries
