= Class of '44 =

1973 US film by Paul Bogart

- Theatrical release poster
- Directed by: Paul Bogart
- Written by: Herman Raucher
- Produced by: Paul Bogart
- Starring: Gary Grimes; Jerry Houser; Oliver Conant; Deborah Winters
- Cinematography: Andrew Laszlo
- Edited by: Michael A. Hoey
- Music by: David Shire
- Distributed by: Warner Bros.
- Release date: April 10, 1973
- Running time: 95 minutes
- Country: United States
- Language: English
- Box office: $6,350,000 (rentals)

Class of '44 is a 1973 American coming-of-age comedy-drama film based on the memoirs of screenwriter Herman Raucher. Directed by Paul Bogart, it is structured as a sequel to the 1971 film Summer of '42 which recounted the events in the earlier portion of Raucher's memoirs.

The film is a slice-of-life style autobiography of sorts, depicting Herman Raucher's (Gary Grimes) first year in college, where he falls in love with Julie (Deborah Winters) under the shadow of the growing threat of World War II. Jerry Houser and Oliver Conant reprise their roles as Oscar "Oscy" Seltzer and Benjy, the two other members of Raucher's circle of friends, "The Terrible Trio," but Conant only briefly appears at the beginning of the film.

== Plot ==
Friends Hermie (an aspiring artist), Oscy (a jock), and Benjy (a nerd) graduate from high school in the spring of 1944, under the looming threat of World War II. At a post-graduation party, Hermie and Oscy are startled when Benjy tells them that he has enlisted in the Marines. While Hermie and Oscy spend their summer vacation working at a loading dock, Benjy goes to Boot Camp. By the end of summer, Hermie and Oscy see Benjy off on his way to fight in the Pacific Theater.

At their fathers' behest, Oscy and Hermie go to college. Much of the film consists of slice of life vignettes depicting college life during wartime, with the effect of the war on the home front as a constant recurring theme.

While Hermie is serious about his studies, Oscy primarily sees college as an opportunity to pick up women. On the campus newspaper staff, Hermie meets and falls in love with Julie, a well-to-do student. At Julie's suggestion, Hermie and Oscy join a fraternity and barely manage to successfully pass through the vigorous mandatory hazing rituals. Shortly after moving into the frat house, however, Oscy is expelled for bringing a prostitute into his room and Hermie is forced to deal with an annoying roommate. Oscy, soon after leaving and seeing no alternative, decides to enlist in the Army.

Hermie and Julie have a falling out after Julie tells him she intends to go out on a non-romantic date with an old boyfriend coming into town on shore leave. Hermie expresses his distrust of Julie and they break up. One night at the frat house, Hermie receives a devastating phone call from his uncle that his father has died unexpectedly. Returning home for the funeral, he is reunited with Oscy, who has passed basic training and is now a clerk typist on Governor's Island. Oscy then takes Hermie out for a night of drinking in his father's memory, culminating in a bar room brawl. Back at Hermie's house, a drunk Hermie voices his inability to accept his father's death before passing out. Oscy stays up through the night, watching over Hermie.

Hermie returns to college and is about to call for a cab at the New York, New Haven and Hartford Railroad train station when Julie arrives in her car. She tells him that Hermie's mother told her about his father's death, and that she has come to reconcile with him. Julie further tells Hermie that she has learned that he has passed his final exams for the semester even though he cheated by hiding the test answers in his shoe and has successfully completed his freshman year. Hermie and Julie reconcile and climb into the back seat of Julie's car as the film ends.

== Cast ==
- Gary Grimes as Hermie
- Jerry Houser as Oscy
- Oliver Conant as Benjy
- Deborah Winters as Julie
- William Atherton as Fraternity President
- Sam Bottoms as Marty
- Joe Ponazecki as Professor
- Murray Westgate as Principal
- Marion Waldman as Grade Advisor
- Mary Long as Valedictorian
- Marcia Diamond as Mrs. Gilhuly
- Jeffrey Cohen as Editor
- Susan Marcus as Assistant Editor
- Lamar Criss as 1st Proctor
- Michael A. Hoey as 2nd Proctor
- Dan McDonald as Father
- Jan Campbell as Mother

Uncredited (in order of appearance)
John Candy	Paulie, high school graduate
Jeanne Beker	Bernice
Jim Henshaw	Fraternity senior
Ralph Endersby	Fraternity senior
John Kerr	Ford Hotel bartender
Stan Kane	Football coach
James Forrest	Football coach
Ed McNamara	Train conductor

== Production ==
The subway scenes in Class of '44 were filmed on location in Brooklyn, New York. A vintage 1920s BMT Triplex train was used and the interior of the 15th Avenue entrance to the New Utrecht Avenue station on the Sea Beach (today's N) line was restored to its 1940s era appearance. The train itself operated on the West End (today's D) line and is seen pulling into the 62nd Street station.

The scene at the diner was filmed actually in Toronto, (Canada) for the purpose of depicting now antique "Presidents' Conference Cars" (P.C.C. style model), that were once spread throughout various American cities' transit systems during the "Great Depression" period since being introduced in the 1930s after a joint transit car redesigning / modernizing program introducing smooth curving streamlining of exterior bodywork and newer up-to-date mechanical / electrical technology with the era's Art Deco style artistic influences, But by four decades later with newer style competing diesel / gasoline-powered engine buses from the General Motors Corporation (GM) becoming ubiquituous. So streetcars on rails in the city streets quickly became termed passe and pressured by the automobile / bus, gasoline and rubber industries to phase-out and rip up the rails and overhead wires after the war, in the late 1940s 1950s and into the early 1960s at the same time that governments were building massive concrete expressways / freeways, Interstate highways and interchanges. Within a few years, the sight of an electric streetcar on a city byway had stunningly almost completely disappeared in the United States except for two or three remaining neighborhood lines in Philadelphia's SEPTA system, the ancient late-19th century cable cars on the steep hills of San Francisco (using a different powering system not electric) becoming a moving national historic landmarks. A few other cities had a couple of cars sitting in a few transit streetcar / bus museums like in Baltimore, and even fewer actually were clanking / whizzing and operating on street rail routes.

The trams / streetcars that ran in wartime Brooklyn during that time period of 1942–1945 of the World War II era in which the movie is set. However, the streetcars seen here in the movie are actually somewhat similar in general appearances but on close examination, can only be told apart by a streetcar / tram / electric urban railways rider buff or expert historian. These in the Class of '44 feature film are actually slightly varied post-war PCC models (characterized by the specific presence of standee type windows, which pre-war PCCs streetcars such as the ones that operated in New York's Borough of Brooklyn then did not have yet). They also have the maroon and cream paint scheme used in Toronto during the early 1970s (when the film was shot) while real-life New York City / Brooklyn's PCCs transit streetcars of the 1940s period were actually painted then in a predominantly tan color scheme. So only a few other motion pictures like this nostalgic Class of '44 from the early '70s, and later producer / director Barry Levinson in his "Baltimore trilogy" of films in his hometown during the 1980s and 1990s showed a good look at old streetcars running frequently and everywhere in the cities of America.

The film is also noted for being the feature film debut of future star film / TV comedian John Candy in a very brief uncredited appearance at the beginning as a fellow high school graduate who interacts with main characters "Hermie" and "Oscy".

== Reception ==
The film received moderate and poor reviews upon its release. Although several venues reportedly granted discounted or even complimentary admission for moviegoers who graduated from high school in 1944, the film was a significant box office failure which was mostly attributed to the film's more standard structure when compared to the "arty" approach of its critically acclaimed Academy Award winning predecessor; the absence of one of the main characters; and no reference to any of the events of Summer of '42. The movie slipped into obscurity, and although Summer of '42 has been available on DVD for several years, where it has been a relative commercial success, Warner Home Video released Class of '44 on made-to-order DVD in 2010.

The film was parodied in the December 1973 issue of Mad magazine as The Clods of '44.
