= The Outing (film) =

- Theatrical poster by Drew Struzan
- Directed by: Tom Daley
- Written by: Warren Chaney
- Produced by: Warren Chaney
- Starring: Deborah Winters; James Huston; Andra St. Ivanyi; Scott Bankston; Red Mitchell
- Cinematography: Herbert Raditschnig
- Edited by: Claudio M. Cutry
- Music by: Bruce Miller; Joel Rosenbaum
- Distributed by: Moviestore Entertainment
- Release date: September 11, 1987
- Running time: 87 minutes
- Country: United States
- Language: English
- Budget: $2–3 million
- Box office: $1.1 million

The Outing (originally titled The Lamp) is a 1987 American supernatural slasher film directed by Tom Daley, and starring Deborah Winters, James Huston, Andra St. Ivanyi, Scott Bankston, and Red Mitchell. It follows a group of teenagers spending the night in a natural history museum who are stalked by the spirit of a malevolent djinn released from an ancient lamp.

The film was originally released in the United Kingdom as The Lamp on April 28, 1987, though it was released as The Outing for in the United States on September 11 of the same year with about 2 minutes of cuts, along with a different opening score.

The film was shot on location in Houston and Galveston, Texas, as well as Los Angeles.

== Plot ==
In 1893, a young Arab girl arrives in Galveston, Texas as a stowaway on a ship with her mother. Her mother dons a magical bracelet, and lies helplessly on the boat as a malevolent jinn murders everyone on board. The girl manages to flee the scene, taking with her a brass lamp and the bracelet.

Many years later, three criminals—two men and a woman—burglarize a mansion owned by the now-elderly woman. When confronted by the criminals, the woman attempts to fight them, but one of the men, Harley, kills her with a hatchet. Harley finds the brass lamp in a lock box. Unbeknownst to him, the genie is released from inside and possesses the old woman's corpse, violently murdering the three burglars.

After surveying the crime scene, an officer sends the evidence, including the lamp and bracelet, for display at the Houston Museum of Natural Science. From inside the lamp, the genie observes the museum's curator, Dr. Bressling, cataloguing the newly arrived artifacts. Dr. Bressling later determines the brass lamp dates back to 3500 BC. The museum archaeologist, Dr. Wallace, is visited by his teenage daughter, Alex, who surreptitiously tries on the bracelet. She and her father subsequently get into an argument about his demanding work schedule, during which Alex tells him she wishes he would die. Afterward, Alex finds herself unable to remove the bracelet from her wrist, and notices a red jewel on the lamp glowing in conjunction with the bracelet.

The next day, Alex and her classmates take a field trip to the museum. There, Dr. Wallace greets Alex's teacher, Eve, whom he is dating. Alex secretly enters her father's office to further inspect the lamp, during which the jinn possesses her. After, Alex convinces her boyfriend Ted and her friends — couples Babs and Ross, and Gwen and Terry — to go on an "outing" to secretly spend the night at the museum. Alex's abusive ex-boyfriend, Mike, learns of the outing and plans to sabotage it. Meanwhile, the genie levitates Dr. Bressling's body and decapitates him with a ceiling fan in his office. It also uses a spear to murder an opera-singing security guard who works in the museum.

That night at the museum, Alex distracts the security guard then lets her friends inside the museum. The group enter the museum, where Alex leads them to the basement where they plan to stay the night and elude the building's security guards. After Babs spills beer on her pants, she and Ross go to the specimen room to use the bath. The jinn tears Ross in two, before reviving and unleashing jars of venomous snakes that bite Babs to death while she bathes. Gwen interrupts her and Terry's lovemaking to ask for a refreshment, which Terry goes in search of. He enters the specimen room to grab a beer and finds the bodies of Babs and Ross. In his horror, he takes no notice of a snake entering his pants. The trouser snake promptly bites him to death, leaving him in a pool of his own vomit.

Meanwhile, Mike and his friend, Tony, who broke into the museum earlier, have been rigging the place to torment the others. Having blocked the door to the room Alex is in and tied the door handle of the specimen room, they go to torment Gwen. Donning masks they find in an artifact storage area, they find Gwen attired in tribal clothing and proceed to harass her. Mike begins to rape Gwen while Tony watches, but the jinn interrupts, killing all three of them. Alex and Ted hear their screams, and rush to the scene. They run in terror from the murder scene and try to escape the museum. The jinn possesses a mummy, which it uses to kill Ted. Meanwhile, while Dr. Wallace and Eve are having a dinner date, they realize that Alex lied about her plans that night, and quickly rush to the museum. It is revealed that the other security guard was killed off-camera by the jinn.

Dr. Wallace and Eve find Alex fleeing through the museum, chased by the jinn, which has revealed its true monstrous form. The jinn tells Alex she is to be the new keeper of the lamp. Pursued by the jinn, the three manage to flee outside, but the jinn kills Dr. Wallace, which neither Alex nor Eve witness. The jinn then animates Dr. Wallace's corpse in an attempt to trick them. Realizing she must destroy the lamp to banish the jinn, Alex throws it into an incinerator inside the museum, killing the djinn.

== Cast ==
- Deborah Winters as Eve Ferrell, Alex's teacher / Arab Woman
- James Huston as Dr. Wallace, Alex's father
- Andra St. Ivanyi as Alex Wallace, Dr. Wallace's daughter
- Scott Bankston as Ted Pinson, Alex's boyfriend
- Red Mitchell as Mike Daley (as Mark Mitchell), Alex's ex-boyfriend
- André Chimène as Tony Greco
- Charity Merrill as Babs
- Barry Coffing as Ross
- Tracye Walker as Gwen
- Raan Lewis as Terry
- Hank Amico as Harley
- Brian Floores as Max
- Michelle Watkins as Faylene
- Danny D. Daniels as Dr. Theo Bressling, Dr. Wallace's co-worker
- Roy Alan Wilson as Bob (guard)
- Coy Sevier as Jeff (guard)
- Christopher Wycliff as School principal
- Blue Deckert as Det. Adams
- Warren Chaney as Det. Charles
- Beverly Wilson-Wilson as Beverly
- Lesley Chaney as paper girl
- Ron Stone as himself

== Release ==
The film was initially released in theaters in the United Kingdom in 1987 under the title The Lamp and was retitled The Outing for its United States theatrical release a few months later.

=== Home media ===
Scream Factory released The Outing on DVD in the US on August 8, 2013, packaged in an All Night Horror Marathon Collection with the films The Vagrant, The Godsend, and What's the Matter With Helen?. On July 14, 2015, Scream Factory released a Blu-ray double feature with The Godsend.

In 2021, Vinegar Syndrome released a limited-edition Blu-ray of the film under its original title The Lamp. This release features a 2K restoration from the film's 35mm interpositive print, with extended scenes, resulting in a 92-minute version of The Lamp not previously released on home video. Extra features include a feature-length audio commentary with the film's cast and crew, the original theatrical trailer, and an extended making-of retrospective documentary. Production of this Blu-ray is limited to 5,000 units.

== Reception ==
The Outing received mostly unfavorable reviews. Richard Harrington of The Washington Post said it was "stupid and senseless, and the special effects look as if they were shot on a family's weekly shopping budget." The Boston Globe called it "a hokey loser". The Los Angeles Times criticized the depiction of evil in the film, saying that it existed merely to terrorize children without motive.

Mark L. Miller of Ain't It Cool News wrote that the film's kills are unimaginative and poorly done. Anthony Arrigo of Dread Central rated it 2/5 stars and called the kills fun but said the film overall is too dull. Writing in Fangoria, Brian Collins rated it 2/4 stars and said that although the film is overlong and boring in parts, it has "some bizarre charm".

In contrast, the Dallas Observer gave the film a more positive review as they felt that "Director Tom Daley's The Lamp is an entertaining slice of '80s cheese that actually delivers once it gets rolling."
