= There Should Have Been Castles =

- First edition (publ. Delacorte Press)
- Author: Herman Raucher
- Language: English
- Publisher: Delacorte Press
- Publication date: 1978
- ISBN: 0-440-09038-5 (first edition)
- Dewey Decimal: 813.54
- LC Class: PZ4.R252 Th

There Should Have Been Castles is a 1978 romantic comedy novel by Herman Raucher. It is a roman a clef, with Raucher acknowledging that the male and female main characters are based on him and his wife, to whom he had been married for twenty years at the time of the book's publication.

== Plot ==
It is the 1950s. Ben Webber is a cocky but disillusioned young man who has spent the last few years of his life waiting for a neighborhood girl—in his eyes, the epitome of lost virtue and beauty—to reach the age of consent so that he can marry her. Ben comes frustrated with his life, though, and leaves his family home in New England to travel to New York in hopes of finding himself. Despite possessing a near-genius IQ, Ben feels no need to strive in academics, instead choosing to toil away in a number of dead-end, low-paying jobs, which he invariably quits or gets fired from after either telling off his boss or getting caught stealing. Down to his last few cigars and without a place to stay, Ben has a chance run-in with Don at a coffee shop; impeccably dressed and exquisitely mannered, Don is nonetheless just as destitute as Ben and facing eviction from his own apartment unless he can find someone to help with the rent. Ben and Don quickly become friends, and Ben moves into Don's apartment, which Ben discovers is actually owned by a trio of airline hostesses who rent the apartment out to Don at a low rate in exchange for providing them anonymous, strings-free sexual favors on their occasional stopovers in town. Ben, a virgin, is initiated into sex by one of the stewardess, and falls in love with her, only to discover shortly thereafter that she is engaged; after one last night, the stewardess relinquishes her third of the apartment and leaves New York, leaving Ben heartbroken and morose.

Meanwhile, nineteen-year-old Ginnie Maitland, the daughter of a wealthy painter and an unfaithful socialite, runs away from home after her father commits suicide in the wake of her mother's running off with another man. Cutting herself off from her inheritance, Ginnie travels to New York in hopes of finding herself and becoming a dancer on Broadway. Alone in the big city, Ginnie falls in with a pair of middle aged men, one Jewish, one Japanese, who are attempting to open a restaurant which serves food based on traditional Kosher and Oriental dishes. Ginnie becomes a hostess for them, and manages to get a job with a dance troupe.

At the same time, Ben has managed to become a mailroom clerk for a movie studio, and begins an arduous climb up the corporate ladder; shortly after getting a promotion into writing taglines, however, he's drafted into the U.S. Army.

Shortly after Ben is drafted, Ginnie's apartment burns down; one of the members of the dance troupe informs her that one of his friends is currently seeking help to pay the rent, since his old roommate has been drafted. The "friend" turns out to be Don, and Ginnie takes up residence with him.

Ben goes through boot camp and is assigned to a base run by Major Holdoffer, a young, boorish soldier who delights in exerting his authority over the men in his command. Ben documents his hellish experiences in letters home to Don, lamenting the lost loves in his life and yearning for purpose; after Don leaves the letters out one day, Ginnie begins reading them and starts writing Ben back. Her letters prove to be a shining ray of hope to Ben, and the two begin falling in love through their correspondence. While Ginnie remains chaste, though, in hopes of losing her virginity to Ben, Ben releases his sexual frustrations with an emotionally dead but sexually predatory middle aged woman named Maggie. In a bit of dramatic irony, the reader becomes aware that the woman is in fact Ginnie's runaway mother, having dumped her lover and moved on to one-night stands with soldiers.

One day, Ben's unit is taken on a dangerous trek by Holdoffer through harsh terrain without proper equipment; in the middle of the night, Holdoffer intentionally gives negligent orders to an elderly soldier after learning that the man is gay, resulting in the soldier's death; the next morning, Holdoffer denies culpability demands that the hike go on. Later in the day, Holdoffer ignores Ben's warning that a machine gun is malfunctioning, and another soldier is fatally shot in the face. As Ben and another soldier prepare to attack Holdoffer, the gay lover of the elderly soldier who died of exposure fatally stabs Holdoffer in the kidney. In exchange for keeping his mouth shut about having warned Holdoffer of the faulty machine gun, the Army agrees to an honorable discharge Ben on a technicality. Ben sleeps with Maggie one last time and then heads back to New York, where he and Ginnie begin a passionate affair. With one another's support, Ginnie becomes a locally renowned dancer, and Ben manages to get one of his scripts read by a television executive, who buys it and turns it into a movie of the week.

However, Ginnie's increasingly busy schedule, coupled with Ben's self-destructive nature, leads to the pair splitting after a disastrous night. While Ben makes a financially successful but debauched trip to Hollywood, Ginnie reaches national fame as a variety show fixture and through her engagement to a prominent socialite—neither being far from the other's mind.
