= The People Next Door (1970 film) =

1970 film by David Greene

- Theatrical release poster
- Directed by: David Greene
- Screenplay by: JP Miller
- Based on: The People Next Door by JP Miller
- Starring: Eli Wallach; Julie Harris; Hal Holbrook; Deborah Winters
- Cinematography: Gordon Willis
- Edited by: Arline Garson
- Music by: Don Sebesky
- Distributed by: Avco Embassy Pictures
- Release date: August 26, 1970
- Running time: 93 mins.
- Country: United States
- Language: English

The People Next Door is a 1970 American drama film directed by David Greene and starring Eli Wallach and Julie Harris. JP Miller adapted the screenplay from his 1968 CBS Playhouse teleplay, which had also been directed by Greene.

== Plot ==
A married couple, Arthur and Gerrie Mason, struggle with the realities of their imperfect marriage as they fight to save and rehabilitate their teenage daughter, Maxie, from having been led into a life of drug addiction and ultimate committal to a mental ward.

== Cast ==
- Eli Wallach as Arthur Mason
- Julie Harris as Gerrie Mason
- Deborah Winters as Maxie Mason
- Stephen McHattie as Artie Mason
- Hal Holbrook as David Hoffman
- Cloris Leachman as Tina Hoffman
- Don Scardino as Sandy Hoffman
- Rue McClanahan as Della
- Nehemiah Persoff as Dr. Salazar
- Mike Kellin as Dr. Margolin

== See also ==
- List of films featuring hallucinogens
