= Maynard's House =

- Cover of first edition
- Author: Herman Raucher
- Cover artist: Wendell Minor
- Genre: Horror
- Set in: Maine
- Publisher: G. P. Putnam's Sons
- Publication date: 1980
- Publication place: United States
- Media type: Print (hardcover)
- Pages: 240 (first edition)
- ISBN: 0-399-12508-6
- OCLC: 6196259
- LC Class: PS3568.A8

Maynard's House is a horror novel by Herman Raucher first published in 1980 by G. P. Putnam's Sons. The book is the story of a young Vietnam War veteran, Austin, suffering from posttraumatic stress disorder who learns that his best friend, the eponymous Maynard, has been killed in combat; in his will, Maynard leaves the narrator his house, a historical site in which a woman accused of witchcraft was killed around the time of the Salem Witch Trials. Austin moves into the house, and shortly thereafter is trapped when an unexpectedly strong winter storm sweeps in. Isolated in the home, the narrator begins to try to come to terms with the trauma of the things he witnessed in combat, and grows increasingly paranoid that the home might be haunted by the murdered witch.
