= Sweet November (1968 film) =

1968 film by Robert Ellis Miller

- Theatrical release poster
- Directed by: Robert Ellis Miller
- Written by: Herman Raucher
- Produced by: Jerry Gershwin; Elliott Kastner
- Starring: Sandy Dennis; Anthony Newley; Theodore Bikel
- Cinematography: Daniel L. Fapp
- Edited by: James T. Heckert
- Music by: Michel Legrand
- Distributed by: Warner Bros.-Seven Arts
- Release date: February 8, 1968
- Running time: 114 minutes
- Country: United States
- Language: English
- Box office: $1.1 million

Sweet November is a 1968 American romantic comedy film written by Herman Raucher and starring Sandy Dennis, Anthony Newley and Theodore Bikel. The film originally had been written as a stage play by Raucher, but before it was performed, Universal Pictures got wind of the project and paid Raucher $100,000 (equivalent to $970,000 in 2025) to stop work on the play and adapt it as a screenplay.

A 2001 remake starred Keanu Reeves and Charlize Theron.

== Plot ==
Successful British box manufacturer Charlie Blake meets Sara Deever when they both take a driver's exam in New York City. She tries to get a few answers from him, but he gets expelled for cheating. They run into each other later and go out on a date.

When they return to her apartment, Charlie meets Alonzo, Sara's older, vegetarian friend. Then Richard bursts in; he begs her to let him stay with her, but she has already packed his bag. After he leaves, Charlie asks her why Richard referred to him as his successor. She explains that she has a "special therapy program"; she takes in a man for no longer than a month to diagnose and fix whatever problem he has. Richard was "October", and she wants him to be "November". She believes his trouble is his devotion to his work. Charlie accepts, though he is only interested in a short fling. He tells his employee, Digby, to send him a telegram after a week so he will have an excuse to leave.

As November progresses, however, Charlie begins to fall in love for the first time in his life with the unorthodox Sara. When he gets the prearranged telegram, he telephones Digby to tell him to handle an important business meeting by himself. Clem Batchman, another of Sara's projects, shows up, inciting Charlie's jealousy, until Sara informs him that he just wants to introduce her to his fiancée, Carol.

Charlie becomes troubled by certain signs that Sara may be ill. When he asks Alonzo, his worst fears are confirmed: Sara has only a little time left. She lives as she does so that she will be remembered after she is gone. Charlie tries hard to get her to break her self-imposed rule, and believes he has succeeded. She later admits to Alonzo that, unlike all the others, she has fallen for Charlie, but wants him to remember her as she is now. Thus, when December (and a clumsy Gordon) arrives, she has secretly packed November's bag. Charlie reluctantly leaves, promising he will never forget her.

== Cast ==
- Sandy Dennis as Sara Deever
- Anthony Newley as Charlie Blake
- Theodore Bikel as Alonzo
- Burr DeBenning as Clem Batchman
- Sandy Baron as Richard
- Marj Dusay as Carol
- Martin West as Gordon
- Virginia Vincent as Mrs. Schumacher
- King Moody as Digby
- Robert Gibbons as Sam Naylor

Audrey Hepburn originally was announced for the lead.

== Reception ==
In her February 9, 1968, review for The New York Times, Renata Adler writes "Sweet November must be the most sentimental and sinister fantasy about contemporary love in years. One can't help leaving the theater sniffling and furious with oneself, which makes the movie a little hard to criticize... But despite all the sick, dreadful assumptions about life that turn out to underlie the plot—and as you think about it after you've seen it, you'll probably be appalled — "Sweet November" succeeds."

== Home media ==
On March 22, 2009, the film was released on DVD by Warner Bros.
