= Blue Sunshine (film) =

1977 film

- Theatrical release poster
- Directed by: Jeff Lieberman
- Written by: Jeff Lieberman
- Produced by: George Manasse
- Starring: Zalman King; Deborah Winters; Mark Goddard; Robert Walden; Charles Siebert
- Cinematography: Don Knight
- Edited by: Brian Smedley-Aston; Russ Kingston
- Music by: Charles Gross
- Distributed by: Cinema Shares International
- Release dates: November 23, 1977 (London Film Festival); December 2, 1977 (Raleigh, North Carolina)
- Running time: 95 minutes
- Country: United States
- Language: English
- Budget: $550,000

Blue Sunshine is a 1977 American horror film written and directed by Jeff Lieberman, and starring Zalman King, Deborah Winters, and Mark Goddard. The plot focuses on a series of random murders in Los Angeles, in which the only common link between the perpetrators is a mysterious batch of LSD that they had all taken years prior.

Over the years, the film attracted a cult following, and was released on special edition DVD by Synapse Entertainment in 2003. It has been shown at many film festivals since.

== Plot ==
During a party, Frannie Scott croons the jazz standard "Just in Time" and playfully tries to kiss his friend's date, causing the friend to pull Frannie's hair, which unexpectedly comes off. The bald Frannie then has a psychotic break, brutally murders several party guests, and chases Jerry Zipkin into the nearby road, where Frannie is hit and killed by a passing truck.

Jerry is wrongly accused of the murders and goes on the lam, trying to gather evidence to prove his innocence, helped by his friends Alicia Sweeney and surgeon David Blume. After learning about a similar sudden mass murder by a bald police officer, Jerry discovers that ten years prior, a group of college students had taken a new form of LSD called "Blue Sunshine," provided by dealer Ed Flemming, and are now suddenly losing their hair and becoming homicidal maniacs many years after their trips are over. Flemming, now a respected local politician running for Congress, lies and tells Jerry he never heard of Blue Sunshine. When Jerry visits Flemming's estranged wife, Wendy, he finds she is also bald and about to murder two children she is babysitting. Jerry saves the children by pushing the knife-wielding Wendy off her apartment balcony, but ends up wrongly accused of her murder as well.

Jerry schemes to prove that Blue Sunshine is causing homicidal psychosis by finding a past user of the drug who is still living and can be tested for chromosome damage caused by the drug. Armed with a paraldehyde dart gun, Jerry goes to a Flemming rally at a shopping mall, having learned that Flemming's campaign manager/ bodyguard Wayne Mulligan (Ray Young) was a heavy Blue Sunshine user. Before Jerry's arrival, the now-bald Wayne goes on a rampage through the mall discotheque, beating and terrorizing its patrons including a police detective and Alicia, and causing crowds to flee the mall in panic. Jerry tracks Wayne to an empty department store and paralyzes him with the dart gun.

An on-screen epilogue states that Wayne was tested, found to have "extensive chromosomic aberrations", and confined to a sanitarium, and that 255 doses of Blue Sunshine are still unaccounted for.

== Cast ==
- Zalman King as Jerry Zipkin
- Deborah Winters as Alicia Sweeney
- Mark Goddard as Edward Flemming
- Robert Walden as David Blume
- Charles Siebert as Detective Clay
- Ann Cooper as Wendy Flemming
- Ray Young as Wayne Mulligan
- Alice Ghostley as O'Malley's Neighbor
- Stefan Gierasch as Lieutenant Jennings
- Richard Crystal as Frannie Scott
- Bill Adler as Ralphie
- Barbara Quinn as Stephanie
- Adriana Shaw as Barbara O'Malley
- Bill Sorrells as Ritchie Grazzo
- Jeffrey Druce as Junkie
- Brion James as Tony
- Argentina Brunetti as Mrs. Rosella
- Meegan King as gun salesman

== Production ==
Lieberman devised the story for Blue Sunshine after his brother, a physician, told him of accounts of people suffering nervous breakdowns associated with LSD they had taken years prior. Filming began in Los Angeles in late 1976.

== Release ==
Blue Sunshine opened theatrically in England at the London Film Festival on November 23, 1977. In the United States, it opened regionally in Raleigh, North Carolina on December 2, 1977, and the following week in Greensboro, North Carolina on December 9, 1977.

=== Critical response ===
Tom Hutchinson of The Sunday Telegraph praised Blue Sunshine, deeming it "the kind of terror tale guaranteed to put you into a state of shock for ages afterwards, besides acquainting us with director, Jeff Lieberman, who has an undeniable, if wilful, talent." When reviewing the film for its local Greensboro, North Carolina release in December 1977, Russ Edmonston of the Greensboro Daily News felt the film was imperfect but effective, writing: "Despite its low budget and less than superb acting...the film can be quite chilling at points."

On the review aggregator website Rotten Tomatoes, 86% of 7 critics' reviews are positive, with an average rating of 6.1/10.

AllMovie gave the film a mildly favorable review, calling it "too uneven to please a general audience" but "offers enough moments of interest for fans of horror films and offbeat cult items."

Fawn Krisenthia of Cult Reviews wrote:

The movie gets a thumbs-up since quirky (Jeff) Lieberman directs. You know you are entering Lieberman’s world when the very movie title is spoken by his parrot. I imagine that Lieberman had a checklist for his 70s style movie, things that were popular at the time. For example, random car chase? Check. Discothèque? Check. Conspiracy theory? Check. Obligatory ‘This movie is based on true events’ disclaimer at the end of the film? Check.

Budd Wilkins of Slant Magazine gave the film two and a half stars out of five and called it "an unjustly neglected genre classic that delivers a deft fusion of horror-movie tropes, social satire, and cult-film weirdness." In the Village Voice, Simon Abrams wrote:

Shot at the end of 1976 and into early 1977, the influential film gradually amassed an eclectic but hardcore following over the years. Its champions include Gremlins filmmaker Joe Dante and even the late critic Andrew Sarris, who praised “Lieberman’s directional talent” and the film’s “intriguing premise” when Blue Sunshine screened on TV in 1982.

Film critic Matt Johns has written that while he overall liked the film, the ending lacked resolution. Using his popcorn bag system, he awarded the film five out of five bags.

=== Home media ===
Synapse Entertainment released a special edition two-disc DVD of the film in 2003. In 2011, New Video issued a DVD release as well.

In 2022, German distributor Camera Obscura released a limited edition special mediabook edition of the film including both 4K Ultra HD and Blu-ray formats with two different cover art options. Synapse Films released the film in a special edition 4K Ultra HD through their website in June 2024.

== See also ==
- List of films featuring hallucinogens
