= Me, Natalie =

1969 film by Fred Coe

- Original poster
- Directed by: Fred Coe
- Screenplay by: A. Martin Zweiback
- Story by: Stanley Shapiro
- Produced by: Stanley Shapiro
- Starring: Patty Duke; James Farentino; Salome Jens; Elsa Lanchester; Martin Balsam; Nancy Marchand; Philip Sterling
- Cinematography: Arthur J. Ornitz
- Edited by: John McSweeney Jr.
- Music by: Henry Mancini
- Production companies: Cinema Center Films; Nob Hill Productions
- Distributed by: National General Pictures
- Release date: July 13, 1969
- Running time: 111 minutes
- Country: United States
- Language: English
- Box office: $1.9 million (US/Canada rentals)

Me, Natalie is a 1969 American comedy-drama film directed by Fred Coe about a young woman from Brooklyn who moves to Greenwich Village and finds romance with an aspiring artistic painter. The screenplay by A. Martin Zweiback is based on an original story by Stanley Shapiro. Patty Duke, who stars in the title role, won a Golden Globe Award for her performance. The film also features James Farentino, Salome Jens, Elsa Lanchester, Martin Balsam and Nancy Marchand. It marks Al Pacino's film debut.

== Plot ==
From childhood, Brooklyn teenager Natalie Miller, who has a slight overbite and a somewhat large nose, considers herself to be homely, and has never subscribed to her mother's determined belief that she will grow up to be pretty. By contrast, her best friend Betty is a popular and beautiful blonde cheerleader who has been going steady with the handsome Stanley since junior high school.

Natalie's efforts to become a cheerleader, impress a blind date, and attend her graduation dance all fail. She is briefly cheered up by her beloved Uncle Harold, who tells her that someday a man will look beyond her face and see her good inner qualities, but she becomes disillusioned after Harold becomes engaged to sexy, voluptuous go-go dancer Shirley. Believing that Harold chose Shirley based on her looks, Natalie regards Shirley with contempt, and when Harold unexpectedly dies, avoids attending his funeral.

A year later, Natalie encounters Shirley, who has turned to drugs in her grief over Harold. Natalie sees that Shirley and Harold really did love each other, and that Shirley's physical attractiveness has not brought her happiness. Natalie's parents worry because she has been expelled from college, has not found a job, and has no boyfriends nor marital prospects. They try to arrange dates for her, and her father attempts to bribe Morris, an awkward aspiring optometrist, to marry her. After learning of the bribery scheme, an incensed Natalie moves out of her parents' apartment, planning to move in with Shirley in Manhattan.

On arriving at Shirley's bohemian apartment building in Greenwich Village, Natalie learns that Shirley has died by drug overdose. Natalie rents and fixes up Shirley's vacant apartment, and is hired as a cocktail waitress at the "Topless Bottomless Club". Natalie is attracted to her downstairs neighbor David Harris, an architect who has left his job for three months to pursue his dream of becoming an artistic painter.

Having dismissed David as a "sex pervert" because he is usually using beautiful nude female models, she is taken aback when David finds her face "interesting" and asks her to model for him. Their friendship gradually grows into romance, with Natalie encouraging his painting aspirations and David building her self-confidence. However, after Natalie sees her old friend Betty enter into an unhappy marriage due to an out-of-wedlock pregnancy, Natalie, who is overcome with love for David, discovers that he is actually married to a wealthy, beautiful woman and has two young sons.

After a confrontation, David reassures Natalie that he really loves her, and that he will go back to his family home, end his marriage, and return to her. At first, Natalie eagerly waits in his apartment for his return, but as time goes by, she feels guilty about separating him from his family. Finally, she writes David a farewell letter, saying that she will always love him, but expressing the wish to take responsibility for her own happiness, and leaves.

== Cast ==
- Patty Duke as Natalie Miller
- James Farentino as David Harris
- Salome Jens as Shirley Norton
- Elsa Lanchester as Miss Dennison
- Martin Balsam as Harold Miller
- Nancy Marchand as Edna Miller
- Philip Sterling as Sidney Miller
- Deborah Winters as Betty Simon
- Ron Hale as Stanley Dexter
- Bob Balaban as Morris
- Al Pacino as Tony
- Catherine Burns as Hester
- Ann Thomas as Mrs. Schroder
- Matthew Cowles as Harvey Belman
- Milt Kamen as Plastic Surgeon
- Robert Frink as Freddie
- Dennis Allen as Max
- Robyn Morgan as Natalie Miller (age 7)

== Production ==
Works by Nathan Wasserberger were used in the film as the paintings produced by David Harris.

== Critical reception ==
In his review in The New York Times, Vincent Canby called the film "an artificial mess of wisecracks and sentimentality", and added, "Locales and a gummy musical score by Henry Mancini and Rod McKuen are among the things constantly impinging on Me, Natalie. Another is Coe's apparent indecision as to whether the movie is a character study or a gag comedy. Mostly it's just gags, delivered abrasively by Miss Duke, who is even less effective when registering pathos."

Roger Ebert of the Chicago Sun-Times found it to be "as conventional and corny as warmed-over Young at Heart... a pleasant film, very funny at times... Patty Duke, as Natalie, supplies a wonderful performance".

TV Guide considered the film to be "somewhat bland", but calls Duke "a wonder", and adds, "Handled by a lesser actress, the results might have seemed more stereotypical, but Duke is convincing."

== Awards and nominations ==
- Golden Globe Award for Best Actress - Motion Picture Musical or Comedy (Patty Duke, winner)
- Grammy Award for Best Original Score Written for a Motion Picture or Television Show (nominee)
- Writers Guild of America Award for Best Drama Written Directly for the Screen (nominee)

== Home media ==
Under license from CBS Studios, Me, Natalie was released on DVD by Via Vision Entertainment on July 22, 2016, and to Blu-ray by Kino Lorber Studio Classics on May 5, 2020.

== See also ==
- List of American films of 1969
