= Deborah Winters =

American actress

- Winters in 1969
- Born: Los Angeles, California, U.S.
- Occupations: Actress; businesswoman; real estate agent
- Years active: 1962–present
- Spouse: Warren Chaney (1984–present)
- Mother: Penny Edwards

Deborah Winters is an American film and television actress and realtor who has appeared in films such as Kotch, The People Next Door, Class of '44 and the television miniseries The Winds of War.

== Early life ==
Deborah Winters was born in Los Angeles, California, the daughter of Ralph Winters, head of television casting for Universal Studios for 28 years, and actress Penny Edwards. She began her film and television career at age five after moving to New York, where she attended the Professional Children's School. She later commenced professional training at the Stella Adler Studio of Acting, New York City. She returned to Los Angeles in 1968, where she studied acting under Lee Strasberg at the Lee Strasberg Institute. Winters continued working, appearing in commercials for Kinney Shoes, Gulf Oil, Lincoln-Mercury, Quaker Oats, and others. In 1966, she received her first major screen role in the Fred Coe comedy-drama, Me, Natalie.

== Film and television career ==
Winters was first cast in the 1968 motion picture Me, Natalie, opposite Patty Duke, James Farentino, and Martin Balsam. She followed shortly afterwards with a second co-starring role opposite Michael Douglas in his first film, the 1969 Hail, Hero!, directed by David Miller. This was followed by a starring role in the CBS Playhouse production of The People Next Door which led to the motion picture remake the following year.

The People Next Door received positive reviews. Roger Ebert said in his Chicago Sun-Times review, "Deborah Winters, is disturbing at first because you think she's too mannered. Gradually the mannerisms become indispensable to the characterization."

Jack Lemmon cast Winters as the female lead opposite Walter Matthau in his sole directorial project, Kotch in 1971. Time wrote of Winters in its October 11, 1972, review, "Winters is one of the few young actresses with comic timing." Winters continued acting with starring roles in film and episodic television including Blue Sunshine (1977), The Outing (1987), and Lottery!.

== Personal life ==
Winters is married to Warren Chaney. As of 2000, she worked as a real estate agent.

== Selected filmography ==
=== Film ===
- Me, Natalie (1969) – Betty
- Hail, Hero! (1969) – Becky
- The People Next Door (1970) – Maxie Mason
- Kotch (1971) – Erica Herzenstiel
- Cilali Ibo Teksas fatihi (1972)
- Class of '44 (1973) – Julie
- Six Characters in Search of an Author (1976) – The Ingenue
- Blue Sunshine (1977) – Alicia Sweeney
- The Outing (1987) – Eve Ferrell / Young Arab Woman / Old Arab Woman
- Behind the Mask (1992) – Annie Strayton

=== Television ===
- Tarantulas: The Deadly Cargo (1977) – Cindy Beck
- Crisis in Sun Valley (1978) – Sandy
- The Winds of War (1983) – Janice Lacouture Henry
- Little Girl Lost (1988) – File Clerk
