= Can Heironymus Merkin Ever Forget Mercy Humppe and Find True Happiness? =

1970 British film by Anthony Newley

- Poster
- Directed by: Anthony Newley
- Written by: Anthony Newley; Herman Raucher
- Produced by: George Fowler; Anthony Newley
- Starring: Anthony Newley; Connie Kreski; Joan Collins; Milton Berle; George Jessel; Bruce Forsyth
- Cinematography: Otto Heller
- Edited by: Dorothy Spencer
- Music by: Anthony Newley (lyrics by Herbert Kretzmer)
- Production companies: Taralex; Universal Pictures
- Distributed by: Rank Film Distributors
- Release dates: 19 March 1969 (NYC); 14 July 1970 (USA); 19 June 1970 (UK)
- Running time: 107 minutes
- Country: United Kingdom
- Language: English
- Budget: $500,000 or £493,108
- Box office: $2.1 million (US/ Canada rentals)

Can Heironymus Merkin Ever Forget Mercy Humppe and Find True Happiness? is a 1969 British musical film directed by Anthony Newley and starring himself, Joan Collins, Milton Berle, George Jessel and Bruce Forsyth. It was written by Newley and Herman Raucher.

== Plot ==
Merkin is an internationally successful singer approaching middle age who retells his life story in a series of production numbers on a seashore in front of his two toddlers and aged mother. His promiscuous relationships with women are explored, particularly Polyester Poontang and the adolescent Mercy Humppe. Merkin compares the relationship with Mercy Humppe to that of Humbert Humbert and Lolita.

Merkin is constantly surrounded by a Satan-like procurer, Goodtime Eddie Filth, and an angelic "Presence" who interrupts Merkin's biography with cryptic Borscht Belt-level jokes to denote births and deaths in Merkin's life. Newley periodically steps out of character to complain about his "Merkin" role with an unseen director, two screenwriters, the film's producers and a trio of blasé movie critics who are turned off by the story's eroticism and lack of plot.

== Cast ==
- Anthony Newley as Heironymus Merkin/Director
- Joan Collins as Polyester Poontang
- Milton Berle as Goodtime Eddie Filth
- George Jessel as The Presence
- Bruce Forsyth as Uncle Limelight
- Stubby Kaye as fat writer
- Connie Kreski as Mercy Humppe
- Patricia Hayes as Grandma
- Victor Spinetti as critic Sharpnose
- Ronald Radd as critic Bentley
- Rosalind Knight as critic Penelope
- Louis Negin as producer Peter
- Julian Orchard as Red Cardinal
- Judy Cornwell as Filigree Fondle
- Margaret Nolan as Little Assistance

== Production ==
The film was shot on the island of Gozo. The set designer for the dream sequences was Loudon Sainthill, who died shortly after finishing his work on the film. The film's original music was written by Newley with lyrics by Herbert Kretzmer).

Collins later cited the film as contributing to her divorce from Newley.

== Critical reception ==
Vincent Canby wrote in The New York Times that Newley "so over extends and overexposes himself that the movie comes to look like an act of professional suicide ... The movie is as self-indulgent as a burp. It's also as pretentious as its form ... The movie is not so free and loose as it is simply out of control." Canby also included in his list of “ten worst films of 1969” for the New York Times: “Newley, who has watched too many Fellini films without actually seeing them, is the greatest argument I know for assembly-line movie production since the success of the Andy Hardy films. A studio boss Like Louis B. Mayer simply would not have put up with such egomaniacal junk.”

The Monthly Film Bulletin wrote: "There appear to be elements of a great many lives in the film, bits and pieces of philosophy, conventions from other media, borrowings from other films. But someone is going to have a hard and unrewarding job trying to find any coherent personal significance in them, and it is difficult to see just what 'statement' this collection embodies."

In The Sunday Times Guide to Movies on Television, Angela and Elkan Allan asked "Can Anthony Newley ever remember that he is just a pleasant light comedian and settle down to earn an unpretentious living?"

Michael Billington of The Illustrated London News wrote: "The kindest thing for all concerned would be that every available copy should be quietly and decently buried."

Rex Reed wrote: "If I'd been Anthony Newley I would have opened it in Siberia during Christmas week and called it a day."

in the Chicago Sun-Times Roger Ebert wrote: "It is strange, wonderful, original, and not quite successful. It is just about the first attempt in English to make the sort of personal film Fellini and Godard have been experimenting with in their very different ways. It is not as great as 8½ [1963] but it has the same honesty and self-mocking quality."

The Radio Times Guide to Films gave the film 2/5 stars, writing: "Anthony Newley's sprawling musical fantasy, a Fellini-esque hotch-potch of dream-like sequences and irreverent whimsy, is a film that could only have been made in the 1960s. Heironymous Merkin sits on a beach surrounded by the flotsam and jetsam of his life, including a film biography which he projects to his family. We learn his story from the vignettes contained in the film-within-the-film. Meanwhile, back in the present, the film company expresses its concern that his movie still has no ending. Joan Collins, Newley's wife at the time, shows off her assets."

British film critic Leslie Halliwell said: "Obscure and pointless personal fantasy, financed at great expense by a major film company as a rather seedy monument to Anthony Newley's totally uninteresting sex life, and to the talent which he obviously thinks he possesses. The few mildly amusing moments are not provided by him."

== Songs ==
A soundtrack album was released in 1969 (MCA Records, MUPS 380):

1. "Overture"
2. "If All the World's a Stage"
3. "Piccadilly Lily"
4. "Oh, What a Son of a Bitch I Am"
5. "Sweet Love Child"
6. "Instrumental"
7. "Chalk and Cheese"
8. "I'm All I Need"
9. "On the Boards"
10. "Lullaby"
11. "Piccadilly Lily (reprise)"
12. "Once Upon a Time"
13. "When You Gotta Go"
14. "I'm All I Need (reprise)"
15. "If All the World's a Stage (reprise)"

All of the songs except the "Instrumental" and "Piccadilly Lily" are included in the 2010 album Newley Discovered (Stage Door Records, STAGE 9022).

== Accolades ==
In 1970, Newley and his co-writer Herman Raucher won the Writers' Guild of Great Britain Award for Best British Original Screenplay.

In 2006, the movie won a readers' poll in the Chicago Tribune as "The Worst Movie Title Ever."
