= Tarantulas: The Deadly Cargo =

- DVD cover
- Genre: Drama; Thriller
- Written by: John Groves; Guerdon Trueblood
- Directed by: Stuart Hagmann
- Starring: Claude Akins; Charles Frank; Deborah Winters; Matthew Laborteaux; Sandy McPeak; Tom Atkins
- Theme music composer: Mundell Lowe
- Country of origin: United States
- Original language: English

Production
- Executive producer: Alan Landsburg
- Producer: Paul Freeman
- Cinematography: Robert L. Morrison
- Editor: Corky Ehlers
- Running time: 100 minutes
- Production company: Alan Landsburg Productions

Original release
- Network: CBS
- Release: December 28, 1977

Tarantulas: The Deadly Cargo is a 1977 American made-for-television horror film directed by Stuart Hagmann and starring Claude Akins, Charles Frank, Deborah Winters, Matthew Laborteaux and Pat Hingle. The film was produced by Alan Landsburg Productions and broadcast on CBS on December 28, 1977.

== Plot ==
In Ecuador, two reckless money-hungry pilots bribe officials in order to fly a load of coffee beans from South America into the United States. To pay off the officials, they sneak aboard three passengers whom they agree to smuggle into the U.S.

Problems arise when sacks of the beans containing deadly tarantulas are loaded into the cargo bay. During the flight, the venomous arachnids, irritated by the plane's vibration and high altitude, escape from the sacks during a fierce thunderstorm. As the plane wobbles under the torrential rains, the sacks split open, spilling the beans and the noxious spiders. The three illegal immigrants are trapped in the cargo hold with the spiders. They vainly attempt to hold off the spiders by swatting them with their shoes, as well as anything else they can find. However, the lethal spiders eventually overcome all three.

Meanwhile, in the cockpit, the pilots work to overcome a developing mechanical problem that endangers the aircraft. They realize they must make an emergency landing as they pass over the orange-producing town of Finleyville, California. Unbeknownst to the pilots, the tarantulas have escaped and begin to swarm the cockpit, attacking the pilots. The plane crash-lands near Finleyville.

The city's emergency response system moves to aid the downed aircraft and pilots. A fire breaks out at the crash site and the deadly tarantulas scurry from the location toward a nearby orange grove. The fire is brought under control and the pilots and passengers are pulled from the airplane. Those not killed begin to exhibit strange symptoms. The town's physician, Dr. Hodgins (Pat Hingle), is baffled until a local citizen who has been bitten, suddenly drops to the ground and begins singing old vaudeville songs.

Cindy Beck (Deborah Winters) and her fiancé (Charles Frank) aid with the investigation. Her brother Matthew (Matthew Laborteaux) finds a spider, but no one listens to him.

A family of aviators, the Beck family, attempts to solve the puzzle of why the plane crashed. They are told that the tarantulas are actually banana spiders, described as "the most aggressive and venomous spider in the world." In the meantime, the tarantulas continue their attacks, and more people are brought into Dr. Hodgins’ clinic. The doctor finally figures it out, but by this time, the spiders have spread out. The city's mayor is fearful that any news of the spiders infesting the city's oranges will bring financial ruin to the township.

Bert Springer (Claude Akins), one of the city's citizens, helps the Beck family investigate. Cindy's brother is bitten and incapacitated by a spider and dies. Bert organizes the townspeople, and they risk their lives trying to save the town as the spiders converge on the orange packing plant.

The plan to get rid of the spiders involves exposing the deadly arachnids to the buzzing sounds of their enemy: wasps. Using an amplified sound of wasps buzzing, the tarantulas are rendered motionless. This allows a crew of townsfolk to collect the spiders in buckets full of alcohol, which kills them. During the process, a non-thinking citizen trying to burn-out the warehouse falls off the roof and onto the electrical generator, resulting in the electrical power being cut off. Soon, the crew is suddenly surrounded by the deadly spiders when the electrical doors slam shut. Steve, a teacher at the School for the Autistic, crawls in through a window near the roof and leads them out to safety. When the power comes back on, the crew returns to take care of the rest of the spiders. The orange crop and town are saved by the heroic group of citizens.

== Cast ==
- Claude Akins .........Bert Springer
- Charles Frank..........Joe Harmon
- Deborah Winters........Cindy Beck
- Matthew Laborteaux.....Matthew Beck
- Sandy McPeak...........Chief Beasley
- Penelope Windust.......Gloria Beasley
- Tom Atkins....Buddy
- Howard Hesseman........Fred
- Bert Remsen...Mayor Douglas
- Pat Hingle...Doc Hodgins
- Charles Siebert... Rich Finley

== Awards and nominations ==
Emmy Award

- Nominated, "Outstanding Achievement in Film Sound Editing for a Special"
- Nominated, "Outstanding Achievement in Film Sound Mixing"
