= Gus (1976 film) =

1976 film by Vincent McEveety

- Film poster by Paul Wenzel
- Directed by: Vincent McEveety
- Screenplay by: Arthur Alsberg; Don Nelson
- Story by: Ted Key
- Produced by: Ron Miller
- Starring: Edward Asner; Don Knotts; Gary Grimes; Tim Conway; Liberty Williams; Dick Van Patten; Harold Gould
- Cinematography: Frank Phillips
- Edited by: Robert Stafford
- Music by: Robert F. Brunner
- Production company: Walt Disney Productions
- Distributed by: Buena Vista Distribution
- Release date: July 7, 1976
- Running time: 95 minutes
- Country: United States
- Language: English
- Box office: $21,873,000

Gus is a 1976 American sports comedy film released by Walt Disney Productions, distributed by Buena Vista Distribution, directed by Vincent McEveety and starring Ed Asner, Don Knotts and Gary Grimes. Its center character is Gus, a football-playing mule. The film did well at the box office and was released on home video in 1981.

== Plot ==
The California Atoms are the worst team in the NFL and have not won a game in years. Team owner Hank Cooper is deeply in debt to two bookmakers named Charles Gwynn and Cal Wilson. When Cooper tells them he cannot pay his debts, the bookies give him a last chance bet: if the Atoms win the upcoming Super Bowl, all gambling debts will be forgiven, but if they do not win, Gwynn and Wilson will take ownership of the team. Meanwhile in Yugoslavia, Andy Petrovic lives in the shadow of his older brother, who's a major local soccer star. One day, Andy discovers that the family mule Gus can kick a ball an amazing distance. The mule's talent earns fame and mention in newspapers.

Desperate to draw in fans, team owner Hank Cooper looks for a great halftime show. His secretary, Debbie, sees a story in her parents' Yugoslavian newspaper about Gus, a mule who can play football. After Gus is a hit in his first halftime show, Cooper and Venner decide to put him in the game as a place kicker. The Atoms go on to win their next few games thanks to Gus, and move to first place in their division.

Gwynn and Wilson, realizing their deal with Cooper is backfiring, hire two incompetent criminals named Crankcase and Spinner to stop Gus from playing and make the team lose. They try several methods to do so, including getting Gus drunk before he's due to kick. Crankcase and Spinner cause the Atoms to lose two games, but the Atoms still make the playoffs.

With the Atoms headed to the Super Bowl, Spinner and Crankcase steal Gus and replace him with an ordinary mule. At the Super Bowl, Gus' handler Andy quickly realizes the mule he has is not Gus, and he and Cooper leave by helicopter to search for Gus. When the two criminals watch the game on TV, Gus goes wild and escapes. A long slapstick chase sequence ensues, ending with Spinner and Crankcase being apprehended and Gus being airlifted to the Super Bowl. The stress of his rescue, however, prompts Gus to collapse on the field as he's about to kick the game-winning field goal, forcing Andy to pick up the ball and run it into the endzone for a touchdown to win the game in the fourth quarter.

== Cast ==
- Ed Asner as Hank Cooper
- Don Knotts as Coach Venner
- Gary Grimes as Andy Petrovic
- Tim Conway as Crankcase
- Liberty Williams as Debbie Kovac
- Dick Van Patten as Cal Wilson
- Ronnie Schell as Joe Barnsdale
- Bob Crane as Pepper
- Johnny Unitas as Himself
- Dick Butkus as Rob Cargil
- Harold Gould as Charles Gwynn
- Tom Bosley as Spinner
- Titos Vandis as Seth Petrovic
- Hanna Hertelendy Molly Petrovic
- Liam Dunn as Dr. Morgan
- Virginia O'Brien as Reporter
- Kenneth Tobey as Assistant Warden
- Irwin Charone as The Hotel Clerk
- Timothy Brown as Calvin Barnes
- Jackson Bostwick as Stjepan Petrovic
- John Orchard as Pemberton Captain
- Richard Kiel as Tall Man
- Henry Slate as Fan
- Larry McCormick as N.Y. Broadcaster
- Larry Burrell as Locker Room Announcer
- Danny Wells as The Referee
- James Almanzar as Coach Garcia
- Milton Frome as Lukom
- Iris Adrian as Fan's Wife
- Bryan O'Byrne as Grocery Store Manager
- Jack Manning as The Mayor
- James Brown as Mammoth Coach
- Warde Donovan as Butcher
- Jeanne Bates as Nurse
- Dick Enberg as Atoms' Announcer
- George Putnam as TV Interviewer
- Stu Nahan as L.A. Sportscaster

== Production ==
This is the only one of their six films together where Don Knotts and Tim Conway do not share any scenes.

Johnny Unitas appears as a commentator with Bob Crane (in his last feature film appearance) supplying the play-by-play during the football broadcasts. Dick Enberg did the play-by-play for the local games.

Gus would be the final feature film for Bob Crane as well as the last film in the promising, yet short career of then 20-year-old Grimes, who retired from acting (except for a single television role in 1983) after this film. This was also the final film appearance of Virginia O'Brien.

== Reception ==
Roger Ebert gave the film two stars out of four and wrote, "Two different kinds of movies have been coming out of the Walt Disney organization in the last few years: Inventive, entertaining fantasies like Escape to Witch Mountain and The Island at the Top of the World, and dreary retreads of tired old Disney formulas. 'Gus,' alas, is in the retread category." Richard Eder of The New York Times called it "a decently average Disney film, with a few funny parts and other parts where you would agree to smile if you could. Where the movie tries the hardest, it fails the most, as in a terribly long and trite comedy sequence in a supermarket." Joseph McBride of Variety called it "a pleasant family comedy" that "has the amiable spirit of a tall tale or kiddie story book, and while the plot mechanics are largely predictable, the cast keeps the ball in the air over the 96-minute running time." Linda Gross of the Los Angeles Times described it as "a funny and loveable, though familiar Disney live-action fantasy film for football families." Gary Arnold of The Washington Post found the film's pace "sluggish" and added, "After a while it becomes impossible to share the kids' glee in the sort of pratfall you can see coming 10 seconds in advance." He conceded, however, that "there's no point in denying or fighting the kick children get out of even mediocre slapstick."

== In later media ==
In Herbie Goes Bananas (1980), a partygoer wearing an Atoms jersey is briefly seen during a masquerade ball scene.

The 1997 Love Bug repurposes character name "Hank Cooper" for the mechanic (Bruce Campbell) who meets Herbie.

Gus can be summoned as a mount in the video games Disney Infinity 2.0 (2014) and Disney Infinity 3.0 (2015) via power disc. In gameplay Gus kicks footballs as his attack.

== See also ==
- List of American football films
- Air Bud (1997) and MVP: Most Valuable Primate (2000), films based on the same premise
