= Charles Siebert =

American actor and television director (1938–2022)

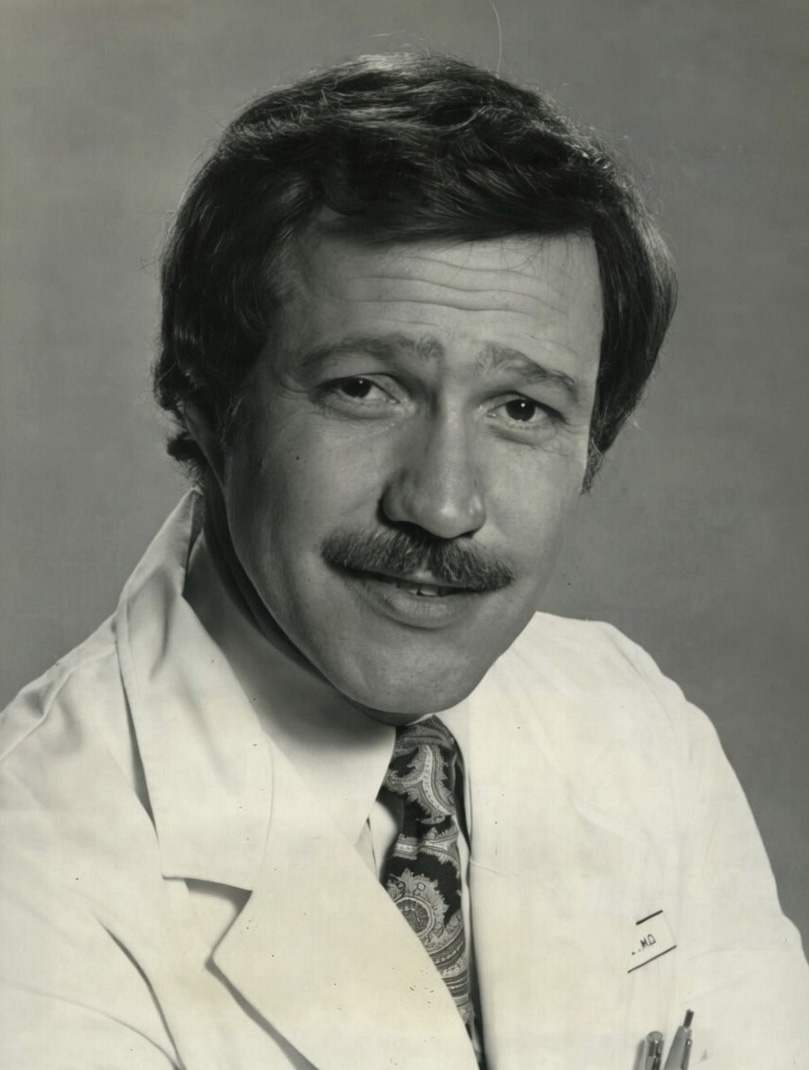
- Siebert in Trapper John, M.D., 1979
- Born: Charles Alan Siebert; March 9, 1938; Kenosha, Wisconsin, U.S.
- Died: May 1, 2022 (aged 84); San Francisco, California, U.S.
- Education: London Academy of Music and Dramatic Art
- Occupations: Actor, director
- Years active: 1965–2001
- Spouse(s): Catherine Mary Kilzer (1962–81; her death); Kristine Leroux (1986)
- Children: 3

Charles Alan Siebert (March 9, 1938 – May 1, 2022) was an American actor and television director. As an actor, he is best known for his role as Dr. Stanley Riverside II on the television series Trapper John, M.D., a role he portrayed from 1979 to 1986, and for his numerous appearances on the $25,000 Pyramid. After 1986, although he continued working as an actor, Siebert's career was focused on working as a director for episodic television for such shows as Xena: Warrior Princess, and Hercules: The Legendary Journeys.

== Early life and education ==
Siebert was born in Kenosha, Wisconsin. He studied acting at Marquette University and the London Academy of Music and Dramatic Art (LAMDA).

== Career ==
He began his career appearing in regional theatre productions throughout the United States during the 1960s with such companies as Shakespeare in the Park in New York City, the Lincoln Center Repertory Company, the American Shakespeare Festival in Stratford, Connecticut, the Guthrie Theater, the McCarter Theatre in Princeton, Chicago's Goodman Theatre, and Baltimore's Center Stage. He spent seven summers at the Williamstown Theatre Festival and was a charter member of the American Conservatory Theater.

He made his Broadway debut in 1967 in Bertolt Brecht's Life of Galileo followed by the role of Michael Leon in John Sebastian and Murray Schisgal's 1968 musical Jimmy Shine with Dustin Hoffman in the title role. Subsequent Broadway appearances included Neil Simon's The Gingerbread Lady, with Maureen Stapleton, David Storey's The Changing Room, David Rabe's Sticks and Bones, and the 1974 revival of Tennessee Williams' Cat on a Hot Tin Roof starring Elizabeth Ashley, Fred Gwynne, and Keir Dullea. Notable Off-Broadway appearances include Colette starring Zoe Caldwell, and Rubbers directed by Alan Arkin.

Siebert began appearing regularly on New York television during the late 1960s and early 1970s, mostly in soap operas like Another World, As the World Turns, Search for Tomorrow, The Nurses, and One Life to Live. Moving to Los Angeles in 1976 Siebert made his first feature film appearance in the horror cult classic Blue Sunshine. He then began appearing as a guest artist on numerous television programs such as One Day at a Time, The Blue Knight, The Rockford Files, Murder, She Wrote and Mancuso, F.B.I. starring Robert Loggia. Also, he was a regular on the comedy program Husbands, Wives & Lovers. In 1987, he was cast alongside Hayley Mills as her husband on the NBC pilot Good Morning, Miss Bliss; however, NBC passed on the program and it was then picked up by the Disney Channel, which made numerous casting changes including dropping Siebert's role. The program would evolve into the Saturday morning hit Saved by the Bell. Film roles throughout the mid to late 1970s included ...And Justice for All with Al Pacino, Michael Crichton's Coma, All Night Long with Barbra Streisand and Gene Hackman, and White Water Summer with Sean Astin and Kevin Bacon.

In 1979, Siebert was cast in his most important role to date, Dr. Stanley Riverside II, on Trapper John, M.D. where he also began his directing career. He played a major supporting role as the mayor of Los Angeles, Frank Baldwin, in the 1990 television miniseries The Big One: The Great Los Angeles Earthquake, a disaster thriller. Siebert was a regular on game shows in the 80s, appearing on incarnations of Pyramid, Match Game, Super Password, and Blackout.

His directing career, which began with seven episodes of Trapper John, M.D., eventually resulted in numerous episodes of Xena, Warrior Princess, Hercules: The Legendary Journeys, Silk Stalkings, Renegade, Pacific Blue, and Vanishing Son, as well as episodes of Knots Landing, The Pretender, Lifestories, Palace Guard and Jack's Place.

== Death ==
Siebert died from COVID-19 related pneumonia on May 1, 2022, aged 84, at UCSF Medical Center in San Francisco.

== Filmography ==
=== Film ===
Year	Title	Role	Notes
1961	Like Father Like Son	Lee	Uncredited
1975	Deadly Hero	Baker	
1977	The Other Side of Midnight	Steve	
1977	Blue Sunshine	Detective Clay	
1978	Coma	Dr. Goodman	
1979	The Onion Field	Roll Call Sergeant	
1979	...And Justice for All	Assistant D.A. Keene	
1979	The Last Word	Fisher	
1981	All Night Long	Nevins	
1987	White Water Summer	Jerry Block	
1988	Eight Men Out	Reds Catcher	

=== Television ===
Year	Title	Role	Notes
1961	Look Up and Live	Devil	Episode: "The Coventry Mystery Cycle: Part Three"
1964	The Presidency: A Splendid Misery	George McClellan	Television film
1966	Hawk	Ambulance M.D.	Episode: "The Shivering Pigeon"
1967	The Winter's Tale	Florizel	Television film
1968	Macbeth	Malcolm	Television film
1968	N.Y.P.D.	Wiley	Episode: "'L' Is for Love and Larceny"
1972	Another World	Dr. Stuart Philbin	2 episodes
1975, 1977	The Rockford Files	Gary Stillman / Bettingen	2 episodes
1975–1978	All in the Family	Young Man / Rabbi / D.A.	3 episodes
1976	Harry O	Shaeffer	Episode: "Mister Five and Dime"
1976	The Adams Chronicles	Charles Francis Adams II	2 episodes
1976	Panache	Rochefort	Television film
1976	Delvecchio	Halsten	Episode: "Board of Rights"
1976	Kojak	Bender	Episode: "By Silence Betrayed"
1976	The Blue Knight	Sgt. Cabe	2 episodes
1976–1978	Barnaby Jones	Various roles	3 episodes
1977	Tail Gunner Joe	James Juliana	Television film
1977	Police Woman	Vince	Episode: "Shark"
1977	The Rhinemann Exchange	Sergeant	Episode #1.1
1977	Dog and Cat	Krayler	2 episodes
1977	Most Wanted	Hank Clayton	Episode: "The People Mover"
1977	Mary Hartman, Mary Hartman	Buzz MacGregor	7 episodes
1977	Husbands and Wives	Dixon Carter Fielding	Television film
1977	Murder in Peyton Place	Kaiserman	Television film
1977	What's Happening!!	Mr. Ramsey	Episode: "Nothing Personal"
1977	The Incredible Hulk	Ben	Episode: "The Incredible Hulk"
1977	Tarantulas: The Deadly Cargo	Rich Finley	Rich Finley
1977–1979	One Day at a Time	Jerry Davenport	6 episodes
1978	Nowhere to Run	Spence	Television film
1978	Wild and Wooly	Sean	Television film
1978	Maude	Vernon	Episode: "Carol's Dilemma"
1978	Richie Brockelman, Private Eye	Stan Hollister	Episode: "A Title on the Door and a Carpet on the Floor"
1978	Husbands, Wives & Lovers	Dixon Carter Fielding	10 episodes
1978	Rhoda	Dr. Murray Berger	Episode: "Rhoda vs. Ida"
1979	Good Times	A.J. Rutherford	Episode: "House Hunting"
1979	Dallas	Sloan	Episode: "The Red File: Part 2"
1979	The Seeding of Sarah Burns	Alex Lovell	Television film
1979	The Runaways	Avery	Episode: "48 Hours to Live"
1979	The Miracle Worker	Captain Keller	Television film
1979	Topper	Stan Ogilvy	Television film
1979–1986	Trapper John, M.D.	Dr. Stanley Riverside II	151 episodes
1980	Here's Boomer	Dan	Episode: "Overboard"
1980	A Cry for Love	Fred	Television film
1981–1987	The Love Boat	Various roles	4 episodes
1986, 1987	Hotel	David Endicott / Dan Mason	2 episodes
1987	Mickey Spillane's Mike Hammer	Charles Forester	Episode: "Lady Killer"
1987	Good Morning, Miss Bliss	Charlie Davis	Episode: "Pilot"
1987, 1994	Murder, She Wrote	Various roles	3 episodes
1988	Perry Mason: The Case of the Avenging Ace	Jason Sloan	Television film
1988	Shakedown on the Sunset Strip	Sgt. Gerber	Television film
1988	ABC Afterschool Special	Mr. McNeil	Episode: "Tattle: When to Tell on a Friend"
1989–1990	Mancuso, F.B.I.	Dr. Paul Summers	3 episodes
1990	Matlock	Dr. Gilbert Lehman	Episode: "Nowhere to Turn"
1990	The Great Los Angeles Earthquake	Mayor Frank Baldwin	Television film
1991	Don't Touch My Daughter	Gordon	Television film
1991	Deception: A Mother's Secret	Peter Meyers	Television film
1991	The Legend of Prince Valiant	Lord Keller	2 episodes
1992	A House of Secrets and Lies	Dr. Hirsch	Television film
1996, 1997	Xena: Warrior Princess	Poseidon / Sisyphus	3 episodes
