= Summer of '42 =

1971 film by Robert Mulligan

- Theatrical release poster
- Directed by: Robert Mulligan
- Written by: Herman Raucher
- Produced by: Richard A. Roth
- Starring: Jennifer O'Neill; Gary Grimes; Jerry Houser; Oliver Conant
- Narrated by: Robert Mulligan
- Cinematography: Robert Surtees
- Edited by: Folmar Blangsted
- Music by: Michel Legrand
- Production company: Mulligan-Roth Productions
- Distributed by: Warner Bros.
- Release date: April 9, 1971
- Running time: 104 minutes
- Country: United States
- Language: English
- Budget: $1 million
- Box office: $32.1 million

Summer of '42 is a 1971 American coming-of-age romance film directed by Robert Mulligan, and starring Jennifer O'Neill, Gary Grimes, Jerry Houser, and Christopher Norris. Based on the memoirs of screenwriter Herman "Hermie" Raucher, it follows a teenage boy who, during the summer of 1942 on (fictional) Packett Island, embarks on a one-sided romance with a young woman, Dorothy, whose husband has gone off to fight in World War II. The film was a commercial and critical success and was nominated for four Academy Awards, winning for Best Original Score for Michel Legrand.

Raucher's novelization of his screenplay of the same name was released prior to the film and became a runaway bestseller, to the point that audiences lost sight of the fact that the book was an adaptation of the film and not vice versa. Though a pop culture phenomenon in the first half of the 1970s, the novelization went out of print and slipped into obscurity throughout the next two decades until an off-Broadway adaptation in 2001 brought it back into the public light and prompted Barnes & Noble to acquire the publishing rights to the book. The film was followed by a sequel, Class of '44, also written by Raucher, with lead actors Grimes, Houser, and Conant reprising their roles.

== Plot ==
In the summer of 1942 on the fictional New England Packett Island (based on the real-life Nantucket Island), 15-year-old "Hermie" and his friends – jock Oscy and introverted nerd Benjie – are hanging out on the beach. They spot a young soldier carrying his new bride into a house and are struck by her beauty.

They continue spending afternoons on the beach, where their thoughts turn to sex. All of them are virgins: Oscy is obsessed with the act of sex, while Hermie develops romantic interest in the bride, whose husband he spots leaving the island on a water taxi one morning. Later that day, Hermie sees her outside the market struggling with grocery bags. He offers to carry the bags home, which she gladly accepts, and in this way, gets to meet her.

Meanwhile, Oscy and Hermie become convinced they know everything necessary to lose their virginity. They test this by going to the movies and picking up a trio of high-school girls. Oscy stakes out Miriam, "giving" Hermie her less attractive friend, Aggie, and leaving Benjie with Gloria, a heavyset girl with braces. Frightened by the potential of sex, Benjie runs off. The other two girls initially refuse to go without Benjie's would-be date, but she says to go without her, then leaves herself. The new bride, who is also at the theater, sees Hermie and asks if he can help her move some boxes on Thursday. During the film, Oscy attempts to fondle Miriam and eventually makes out with her. Hermie succeeds in kissing Aggie, who allows him to grope what he thinks is her breast; Oscy later points out that Hermie was fondling her arm.

On Thursday, Hermie helps the bride move boxes into her attic, and she thanks him with a kiss on the forehead. Later, in preparation for a marshmallow roast on the beach with Aggie and Miriam, Hermie goes to the drugstore and amusingly builds up the nerve to ask the druggist for condoms (or "rubbers", as they were known in the '40s). That night, Hermie roasts marshmallows with Aggie while Oscy has sex with Miriam behind the dune bushes. Oscy returns and asks Hermie for some condoms. Aggie, wondering what is going on, walks over to Oscy and Miriam, sees them having sex, and runs home, upset.

The next day, Hermie comes across the bride sitting outside her house, writing a letter to her husband. Hermie offers to keep her company that night, and she accepts. Hermie says he does not know her name and she replies her name is Dorothy. Later, Hermie runs into Oscy, who relates that Miriam's appendix burst and she has been rushed to the mainland. When Oscy asks about Dorothy and makes crude comments, Hermie rebukes him for his crassness.

When Hermie arrives at Dorothy's house that evening, he finds it strangely quiet. He sees a spinning record with the needle stuck in the run-out groove, a bottle of whiskey on a table, a burning cigarette in an ashtray and next to it a telegram. Dorothy's husband has been killed in action, his plane shot down over France. Dorothy comes out of her bedroom in tears. She greets Hermie, switches on the phonograph then walks into the kitchen and begins washing dishes. Hermie says, "I'm sorry." Dorothy turns toward Hermie, slowly approaches him and silently lays her head on his shoulder and they dance together, both in tears; then they kiss. Taking his hand, she leads him to the bedroom. They silently undress and Dorothy draws Hermie into bed and gently makes love with him. Afterward, she withdraws to the porch. Hermie approaches her, and she tells him goodnight. He then leaves, his last image of Dorothy being of her leaning against the railing as she smokes a cigarette and stares into the night.

The next day, Hermie and Oscy reconcile, with Oscy informing Hermie that Miriam will recover. Oscy is curious about what happened with Dorothy, but Hermie remains silent. Hermie returns to Dorothy's, only to find the house deserted. She has left behind a letter for Hermie explaining that she must return home and that in time he will find a proper way to remember what happened between them. She assures him that she will remember him and hopes he will be spared from life's senseless tragedies, wishing him "good things, only good things", signing, "Always, Dorothy."

In the finishing narrator voiceover, the adult Hermie notes that he would never see Dorothy again nor learn what became of her. The film concludes: "In the summer of '42 we raided the Coast Guard station four times, we saw five movies and had nine days of rain. Benjie broke his watch, Oscy gave up the harmonica, and, in a very special way, I lost Hermie. Forever."

== Cast ==
- Jennifer O'Neill as Dorothy
- Gary Grimes as Hermie
- Jerry Houser as Oscy
- Oliver Conant as Benjie
- Katherine Allentuck as Aggie
- Christopher Norris as Miriam
- Lou Frizzell as druggist

Director Robert Mulligan provided uncredited voiceover narration as the older Hermie. Maureen Stapleton (Katherine Allentuck's mother) provided the voice for Sophie, Hermie's mother, and film stuntman Walter Scott appears uncredited as Dorothy's husband.

== Production ==
=== Basis and development ===
The film (and subsequent novel) were memoirs written by Herman Raucher; they detailed the events in his life over the course of the summer he spent on Nantucket Island in 1942 when he was fourteen years old. Originally, the film was meant to be a tribute to his friend Oscar "Oscy" Seltzer, an Army medic killed in the Korean War. Seltzer was shot dead on a battlefield in Korea while tending to a wounded man; this happened on Raucher's birthday, and consequently, Raucher has not celebrated a birthday since. While writing the screenplay, Raucher realized that despite growing up with Oscy and having bonded with him through their formative years, the two had never really had any meaningful conversations or known one another on a more personal level.

Instead, Raucher decided to focus on the first major adult experience of his life, that of falling in love for the first time. The woman (named Dorothy, like her screen counterpart) was a fellow vacationer on the island whom the 14-year-old Raucher had befriended one day when he helped her carry groceries home; he became a friend of her and her husband and helped her with chores after her husband was called to fight in World War II. On the night memorialized in the film, Raucher randomly came to visit her, unaware his arrival was just minutes after she received notification of her husband's death. She was confused and upset, had been drinking heavily, and repeatedly called Raucher by her husband's name. Although both ultimately disrobed, contrary to popular perception, sexual intercourse did not occur. Raucher admitted this in a 2002 interview, saying it was mostly holding, but in the movie "We let you think what you want."

The next morning, Raucher discovered that she had left the island, leaving behind a note for him (which is read at the end of the film and reproduced in the book). He never saw her again; his last "encounter" with her, recounted on an episode of The Mike Douglas Show, came after the film's release in 1971, when she was one of over a dozen women who wrote letters to Raucher claiming to be "his" Dorothy. Raucher recognized the "real" Dorothy's handwriting, and she confirmed her identity by making references to certain events only she could have known about. She told Raucher that she had lived for years with the guilt that she had potentially traumatized him and ruined his life. She told Raucher that she was glad he turned out all right, and that they had best not re-visit the past.

In a 2002 Scripps Treasure Coast Publishing interview, Raucher lamented never hearing from her again and expressed his hope that she was still alive. Raucher's novelization of the screenplay, with the dedication, "To those I love, past and present," serves more as the tribute to Seltzer that he had intended the film to be, with the focus of the book being more on the two boys' relationship than Raucher's relationship with Dorothy. Consequently, the book also mentions Seltzer's death, which is absent from the film adaptation.

An error in both the book and film centers on the movie Now, Voyager. They go to a movie theater to see the movie in the "summer of '42". However, the film was released nationally in the U.S. on October 31, 1942, with an October 22 premiere in New York City, so it would have been impossible to see the movie that summer.

Raucher wrote the film script in the 1950s during his tenure as a television writer, but "couldn't give it away." In the 1960s, he met Robert Mulligan, best known for directing To Kill a Mockingbird. Raucher showed Mulligan the script, and Mulligan took it to Warner Bros., where Mulligan argued the film could be shot for the relatively low price of $1 million, and Warner approved it. They had so little faith in the film becoming a box-office success, though, they shied from paying Raucher outright for the script, instead promising him ten percent of the gross.

=== Casting ===
When casting for the role of Dorothy, Warner Bros. declined to audition any actresses younger than the age of 30; Jennifer O'Neill's agent, who had developed a fondness for the script, convinced the studio to audition his client, who was only 22 at the time. O'Neill auditioned for the role, albeit hesitantly, not wanting to perform any nude scenes. O'Neill got the role and Mulligan agreed to find a way to make the film work without blatant nudity.

=== Filming ===
Though set on the east coast, Summer of '42 was filmed in Northern California, largely in Fort Bragg and Mendocino, as the real island of Nantucket was too developed to pass for the '40s. Shooting took place over eight weeks, during which O'Neill was sequestered from the three boys cast as "The Terrible Trio," in order to ensure that they did not become close and ruin the sense of awkwardness and distance that their characters felt towards Dorothy. Production ran smoothly, finishing on schedule.

After production, Warner Bros., still wary about the film being only a minor success, asked Raucher to adapt his script into a book. Raucher wrote it in three weeks, and Warner Bros. released it prior to the film to build interest in the story. The book quickly became a national bestseller, so that when trailers premiered in theaters, the film was billed as being "based on the national bestseller," despite the film having been completed first. Ultimately, the book became one of the best-selling novels of the first half of the 1970s, requiring 23 reprints between 1971 and 1974 to keep up with customer demand.

== Release ==
=== Box office ===
The film became a blockbuster upon its release, grossing over $32 million, making it one of the most successful films of 1971, with an expense-to-profit ratio of 1:32;. Beyond that, it is estimated video rentals and purchases in the United States since the 1980s have produced an additional $20.5 million. On this point, Raucher said in May 2002 that his ten percent of the gross, in addition to royalties from book sales, "has paid bills ever since."

=== Critical response ===
Summer of '42 received positive reviews. The review aggregator website Rotten Tomatoes reported a 79% approval rating based on 24 reviews. Metacritic, which uses a weighted average, assigned the film a score of 59 out of 100, based on 9 critics, indicating "mixed or average reviews".

In The Guardian, Derek Malcolm wrote Summer of '42 "is one of those rare films you can't help liking simply for its aspirations, which are so honest and open-minded." He concluded, "You could, I suppose, view it as a deeply romantic film full of a specifically American yearning for the purity of pubescence. You could also view it more simply as an ingratiating comedy about latent sexuality. Either way you can't doubt its charm and sheer professionalism, even if the pace is slack at times."

Vincent Canby of The New York Times expressed that Hermie's encounter with Dorothy is "a good deal more common in novels and screenplays (and in the Hermie-like fantasies of middle-aged writers) than in real life", but praised the film's "reticent quality of its romanticism" and its actors. Canby concluded the "foreground is mostly accurate, in which sexual panic and fist fights and nose bleeds are treated with the great comic respect they deserve."

Some critics were critical of the film's nostalgic framework. Roger Ebert of the Chicago Sun-Times said the film is undercut by its rose-tinted nostalgic tone, writing, "Nostalgia is used as a distancing device -- to keep us safely insulated from the boy's immediate grief, love, and passion." Ebert noted the film is "beautifully produced and photographed", but lacked more of a perspective on Hermie's experiences and how it changed him. Variety wrote, "The emotional and sexual awakening of teenagers is a dramatic staple. Robert Mulligan’s Summer of '42 has a large amount of charm and tenderness; it also has little dramatic economy and much eye-exhausting photography which translates to forced and artificial emphasis on a strungout story."

== Accolades ==
Award	Category	Nominee(s)	Result
Academy Awards	Best Original Screenplay	Herman Raucher	Nominated
Academy Awards	Best Original Score	Michel Legrand	Won
Academy Awards	Best Cinematography	Robert Surtees	Nominated
Academy Awards	Best Film Editing	Folmar Blangsted	Nominated
BAFTA Awards	Best Original Music	Michel Legrand	Won
BAFTA Awards	Most Promising Newcomer to Leading Film Roles	Gary Grimes	Nominated
Directors Guild of America Awards	Outstanding Directorial Achievement – Feature Film	Robert Mulligan	Nominated
Golden Globe Awards	Best Motion Picture – Drama		Nominated
Golden Globe Awards	Best Director	Robert Mulligan	Nominated
Golden Globe Awards	Best Original Score	Michel Legrand	Nominated
Golden Globe Awards	New Star of the Year – Actor	Gary Grimes	Nominated

=== Home media ===
Warner Bros. Home Entertainment first released the film on VHS in 1984. It was released on DVD by Warner in 2002. The Warner Archive Collection reissued the DVD in 2014, followed by a Blu-ray release in 2017.

== Soundtrack ==
Summer of '42: Original Motion Picture Score

Soundtrack album by Michel Legrand
- Released: 1971
- Label: Warner Bros. Records

The film's soundtrack consists almost entirely of compositions by Michel Legrand, many of which are variants upon "The Summer Knows", the film's theme. Lyrics are by Marilyn and Alan Bergman. Because the complete score runs just under 17 minutes, only the first and eighth tracks on the album are from Summer of '42; the rest of the music is taken from Legrand's score for 1969's The Picasso Summer.

Main theme "Summer of '42" won a Grammy Award at 14th edition held in 1972 for Best Instrumental Composition.

In addition to Legrand's scoring, the film also features the song "Hold Tight" by The Andrews Sisters and the theme from Now, Voyager. On the Billboard 200, it debuted on November 9, 1971, and peaked at #52 on November 20, 1971.

Summer of '42: Original Motion Picture Score
No.	Title	Length
1.	"Summer of '42 (Main Theme)"	3:51
2.	"Summer Song"	4:21
3.	"The Bacchanal"	1:48
4.	"Lonely Two"	2:04
5.	"The Danger"	2:13
6.	"Montage: But Not Picasso / Full Awakening"	3:32
7.	"High I.Q"	2:11
8.	"The Summer Knows"	1:47
9.	"The Entrance to Reality"	3:04
10.	"La Guerre"	3:15
11.	"Los Manos de Muerto"	3:29
12.	"Awakening Awareness"	2:26
13.	"And All the Time"	1:43
Total length:		35:44

In 2014 Intrada Records released Summer of '42 and The Picasso Summer on a limited-edition two-disc set, with the entire score for the former and the original album presentation of the latter (dubbed "The Picasso Suite") on disc 1, and the complete score for The Picasso Summer on disc 2.

Warner Bros. Publications released a sheet music folio, Summer of '42 & Other Hits of the Forties, which contains the movie theme and 34 other unrelated songs.

=== Music ===
"The Summer Knows"

Single by Peter Nero

from the album Summer of '42
- B-side: "Theme From 'Jesus Christ, Superstar' (A Rock Opera)"
- Released: May 19, 1971
- Genre: Pop, easy listening
- Length: 2:48
- Label: Columbia
- Songwriter: Michel Legrand
- Producer: Paul Leka

Peter Nero singles chronology
"Theme From 'Love Story'" (1970)	"The Summer Knows" (1971)	"Brian's Song" (1972)

"The Summer Knows"

Single by Biddu Orchestra

from the album Blue-Eyed Soul
- B-side: "Northern Dancer"
- Released: 16 May 1975
- Genre: Northern soul, disco
- Length: 3:08
- Label: Epic
- Songwriter: Michel Legrand
- Producer: Biddu

Biddu Orchestra singles chronology
"The Summer Knows" (1975)	"I Could Have Danced All Night" (1975)

Legrand's theme song for the film, "The Summer Knows", has since become a pop standard, being recorded by such artists as Peter Nero (who had a charting hit with his 1971 version), Biddu (1975 international chart hit), Tony Bennett, Frank Sinatra, Sarah Vaughan, Andy Williams, Jonny Fair, Scott Walker, Elis Regina, Jackie Evancho, Oscar Peterson, Bill Evans, Toots Thielemans, George Benson, Roger Williams, and Barbra Streisand.

The 1973 song "Summer (The First Time)" by Bobby Goldsboro has almost exactly the same subject and apparent setting, although there is no direct credited link. Bryan Adams has, however, credited the film as being a partial inspiration for his 1985 hit "Summer of '69".

Garth Brooks' 1993 hit "That Summer" features a similar story of a coming-of-age male in a romance with an older female.

==== Chart history ====
Roger Williams

Chart (1971)	Peak position
US Cash Box	118

Peter Nero

Chart (1971–72)	Peak position
Australia (Kent Music Report)	70
Canada RPM Top Singles	17
US Billboard Hot 100	21
US Billboard Adult Contemporary	6
US Cash Box Top 100	21

Biddu Orchestra

Chart (1975)	Peak position
Australia (Kent Music Report)	54
Canada RPM Adult Contemporary	21
Canada RPM Top Singles	77
Ireland (IRMA)	13
UK	14
US Billboard Hot 100	57
US Billboard Adult Contemporary	10
US Cash Box Top 100	54

== Legacy ==
In the years since the film's release, Warner Bros. has attempted to buy back Raucher's ten percent of the film as well as his rights to the story so it could be remade; Raucher has consistently declined. The 1988 film Stealing Home has numerous similarities to both Summer of '42 and Class of '44, with several incidents (most notably a subplot dealing with the premature death of the protagonist's father and the protagonist's response to it) appearing to have been directly lifted from Raucher's own life; Jennifer O'Neill stated in 2002 she believes Home was an attempted remake of Summer.

Filmmaker Stanley Kubrick cited it as one of his favorite films of all time, and featured it in a scene in The Shining (1980), during which the character of Wendy Torrance watches the film on television. Director Quentin Tarantino is also an admirer of it, and declared it "one of the best movies of the ’70s."

=== Sequel ===
In 1973, the film was followed by Class of '44, a slice-of-life film made up of vignettes about Herman Raucher and Oscar Seltzer's experiences in college. Class of '44 involves the boys facing army service in the last year of World War II. The only crew member from Summer of '42 to return to the project was Raucher himself, who wrote the script; a new director and composer were brought in to replace Mulligan and Legrand. Of the four principal cast members of Summer of '42, only Jerry Houser and Gary Grimes returned for prominent roles, with Oliver Conant making two brief appearances totaling less than two minutes of screen time. Jennifer O'Neill did not appear in the film at all, nor was the character of Dorothy mentioned.

The film met with poor critical reviews; the only three reviews available at Rotten Tomatoes are resoundingly negative, with Channel 4 calling it "a big disappointment," and The New York Times stating "The only things worth attention in 'Class of '44' are the period details," and "'Class of '44' seems less like a movie than 95 minutes of animated wallpaper."

=== Off-Broadway musical ===
In 2001, Raucher consented to the film being made into an off-Broadway musical play. He was on hand opening night, giving the cast a pep talk which he concluded, "We've now done it every possible way – except go out and piss it in the snow!" The play met with positive critical and fan response, and was endorsed by Raucher himself, but the play was forced to close down in the aftermath of the September 11 attacks. Nevertheless, the play was enough to spark interest in the film and book with a new generation, prompting Warner to re-issue the book (which had since gone out of print, along with all of Raucher's other works) for sale with Barnes & Noble's online bookstore, and to restore the film and release it on DVD. The musical has since been performed across the country, at venues such as Kalliope Stage in Cleveland Heights, Ohio in 2004 (directed by Paul Gurgol) and Mill Mountain Theatre in Roanoke, Virginia, (directed by Jere Hodgin and choreographed by Bernard Monroe), and was subsequently recorded as a concert by the York Theatre Company in 2006.

=== Alternative sequel ===
In 2002, O'Neill claimed to have obtained the rights to make a sequel to Summer of '42, based on a short story she wrote. This story took place in an alternate reality where Herman Raucher had a son and divorced his wife, went back to Nantucket in 1962 with a still-living Oscar Seltzer, encountered Dorothy again and married her. As of 2017, this project – which O'Neill had hoped to produce with Lifetime television – had not been realized. It is unknown if O'Neill is still attempting to get it produced or if Raucher consented to its production.

== See also ==
- List of American films of 1971
