= Herman Raucher =

American writer (1928–2023)

- Born: April 13, 1928; New York City, New York, U.S.
- Died: December 28, 2023 (aged 95); Stamford, Connecticut, U.S.
- Education: New York University
- Occupations: Author; screenwriter; playwright
- Spouse: Mary Martinet (m. 1960; died 2002)
- Writing career
- Language: English
- Genres: Fiction, film, theatre
- Website: hermanraucher.com

Herman Raucher (April 13, 1928 – December 28, 2023) was an American author and screenwriter who penned the autobiographical screenplay and novel Summer of '42, which became one of the highest-grossing films and one of the best selling novels of the 1970s. Raucher began his writing career during the Golden Age of Television, when he moonlighted as a scriptwriter while working for a Madison Avenue advertising agency. He effectively retired from writing in the 1980s after a number of projects failed to come to fruition, though his books remain in print and a remake of one of his films, Sweet November, was produced in 2001.

== Life and career ==
Herman Raucher was born in Brooklyn, New York, on April 13, 1928, the son of Sophie (Weinshank), a homemaker, and Benjamin Brooks Raucher, a traveling salesman. His family was Jewish. His father was a World War I veteran whom Raucher recalled as having a bayonet wound across his forehead. The family's financial situation fluctuated according to the success of the elder Raucher's career. During more profitable years, the family vacationed on Nantucket. During one such trip, when he was fourteen, Raucher developed a friendship with an older woman he identified as "Dorothy", whose husband was fighting in Europe, an event which formed the basis for Summer of '42. During this time, Raucher's best friend was a boy named Oscar "Oscy" Seltzer, who became a United States Army medic and who died during the Korean War while tending to a wounded soldier.

After graduating from high school, Raucher attended New York University, where he studied advertising and worked as a cartoonist for $38 per week, drawing comic strips. After graduating he became an office boy at 20th Century Fox and eventually worked his way into advertising; Raucher was known for his hobby of writing plays, which several ad executives believed to be the mark of a creative genius. Raucher proved successful as an ad man, and was part of the advertising team that developed the ad campaign for the opening of Disneyland.

While working as an ad executive, Raucher simultaneously pursued a writing career, and several of his plays were successfully staged on Broadway, including Harold, one of the earliest plays to feature Anthony Perkins. Raucher also wrote for television, with short plays being featured as segments on a number of variety shows. A film agent saw a preliminary draft of the script for Raucher's play Sweet November and helped Raucher negotiate a sale of the script to Warner Brothers. While working on Sweet November, Raucher befriended Anthony Newley, with whom he shared a lifelong friendship. Following the success of Sweet November, Raucher helped Newley co-write Can Heironymus Merkin Ever Forget Mercy Humppe and Find True Happiness?, which became a cult film.

Inspired by several of his friends who expressed liberal sentiments while retaining racist ideologies, Raucher wrote the script for Watermelon Man. He successfully sold the script and partnered with Melvin Van Peebles on making the film, though he was displeased with Van Peebles' desire to alter his script in order to make the picture a black power movie. Due to the two's tense relationship, Raucher novelized his original script, both to retain his original message and to prevent Van Peebles from publishing his own version of the story. Van Peebles' idea to turn Watermelon Man into the first black power picture later became Sweet Sweetback's Baadasssss Song.

For much of his early career, Raucher had attempted to sell a screenplay based on his experiences with Dorothy and Oscar Seltzer; after seven years he successfully sold the script of Summer of '42 to Robert Mulligan, who was looking to recreate the success of To Kill a Mockingbird. Although the script originally began as a tribute to Seltzer, Raucher instead found himself focusing more on Dorothy. Warner Bros., fearful that the movie would be a box office bomb, not only agreed to give Raucher a large share of the royalties in lieu of payment but also paid him to write a novelization of his script in an effort to drum up interest in the movie. Using the opportunity, Raucher focused the novel more on his relationship with Seltzer and less on Dorothy. Against expectation, Summer of '42 became a national bestseller and helped drive the movie to become one of the highest-grossing films of the 1970s. Raucher continued to write prolifically throughout the 1970s, ultimately publishing six novels and penning six screenplays throughout the decade. He effectively retired in the 1980s, when a number of planned film projects failed to materialize, notably a film adaptation of his bestselling novel There Should Have Been Castles, a period piece about 1950s artists partially inspired by his early career, which studio executives said was too lewd to successfully market. Despite this, Summer of '42 has continued to be a cultural phenomenon, with a Broadway show based on the film being produced in 2001. A planned film of Maynard's House, Raucher's sole horror novel, was trapped in development hell for much of the 1990s and 2000s, with the rights last belonging to Studio Canal, which planned to produce it under the title Ara/Froom.

== Personal life and death ==
In 1960, Raucher married Broadway dancer Mary Kathryn Martinet (1926–2002), with whom he had two daughters. The two remained married until her death from cancer in July 2002.

Raucher died in Stamford, Connecticut, on December 28, 2023, at the age of 95.

== The Great Santini ==
Raucher is often credited as a ghostwriter for the film The Great Santini. However, Raucher did not work on the film, but instead was hired to write the pilot for a failed television adaptation of the film in the 1980s. Nonetheless, Raucher said that he continued to receive fan mail for The Great Santini, second only to letters for Summer of '42.

== Influence ==
Journalist and novelist Preston Fassel cites Raucher's work, particularly A Glimpse of Tiger, as an influence on his own writing. Fassel credits a brief correspondence with Raucher in college, during which Raucher encouraged him to become a writer, as inspiring him to pursue fiction writing. Fassel wrote a biographical article about Raucher for the website Cinedump.com.

== Bibliography/filmography ==
=== Autobiographical works ===
- Summer of '42 (1971; novel and screenplay)
- Class of '44 (1973; screenplay)
- There Should Have Been Castles (1978; novel)
  - Published in Italy as La Vestaglia Della Zingara (The Gypsy Robe)
  - Published in Poland as Prawie Jak w Bajce (Almost a Fairy Tale)

=== Non-autobiographical works ===
- Studio One (television series)
- Goodyear Television Playhouse (television series)
- The Alcoa Hour (television series, episodes "Finkle's Comet" and "The Magic Horn")
- Sweet November (screenplay)
- Follow That Dream (play adaptation, Pioneer, Go Home!; uncredited)
- Can Heironymus Merkin Ever Forget Mercy Humppe and Find True Happiness? (screenplay)
- Watermelon Man (novel and screenplay; novel originally published as The Night the Sun Came Out on Happy Hollow Lane)
- Harold (play)
- A Glimpse of Tiger (novel) ISBN 9780399103407 OL 30552059M
  - Published in Spanish as Requiem por una secretaria (Requiem of a Secretary)
- Remember When (screenplay)
- Ode to Billy Joe (novel and screenplay)
  - Published in Spanish as Sublime Amor Juvenile
- The Other Side of Midnight (screenplay)
- Maynard's House (novel) ISBN 9781626818095 OL 29280798M
- Ginger (play)
- Kitty Hawk: The Musical (play)
