= Death in Small Doses (1995 film) =

1995 television film by Sondra Locke

- Genre: True crime
- Written by: Scott Swanton
- Directed by: Sondra Locke
- Starring: Richard Thomas; Tess Harper; Glynnis O'Connor; Shawn Elliot
- Music by: Jeff Rona
- Country of origin: United States
- Original language: English

Production
- Executive producers: Robert Greenwald; Carla Singer
- Producer: Philip Kleinbart
- Cinematography: William A. Fraker
- Editor: John W. Wheeler
- Running time: 92 minutes
- Production company: Robert Greenwald Productions

Original release
- Network: ABC
- Release: January 16, 1995

Death in Small Doses is a 1995 American true crime television film directed by Sondra Locke and written by Scott Swanton. It was produced by Robert Greenwald Productions and stars Richard Thomas, Tess Harper, Glynnis O'Connor and Shawn Elliot. The film is a dramatization of the 1991 death of wealthy Dallas resident Nancy Lyon (played by O'Connor) by arsenic poisoning, a crime for which her husband Richard Lyon (Thomas) was the police's main suspect.

Locke was drawn to Swanton's script due to its ambiguity concerning Richard's guilt, which she thought would keep the audience guessing. Thomas similarly liked that the film does not give a definitive resolution to the crime unlike most other crime dramas. Marking her television directorial debut, Locke found the tight schedule to be a challenge and noted that the nature of the true crime genre limited the dramatic scope of the story. The film was shot on location in Charlotte and Monroe, North Carolina, in early 1993.

After having its release date delayed for a year, Death in Small Doses premiered on ABC on January 16, 1995, to mixed reviews. Critics who found the film engaging mostly attributed its success to Locke's direction and Thomas' performance. Others criticized the underdeveloped and unsympathetic characters, while the ambiguous resolution drew mixed reactions. The film received a Nielsen rating of 11.0, making it the 40th-highest-rated prime time broadcast for its respective week.

== Plot ==
On January 9, 1991, in Dallas, Texas, Nancy Lyon is rushed to the hospital where she eventually dies from arsenic poisoning. Detective Ortega and A.D.A. Sims investigate the case. The pair question Nancy's wealthy family, the Dillards, who tell them that Nancy and her husband, Richard Lyon, had recently gotten back together after Richard previously left to be with his mistress. According to the Dillards, Nancy had suspected that Richard was slowly poisoning her, but had been too embarrassed to get the police involved. Nancy's brother Bill is adamant that Richard killed Nancy so as to inherit her fortune. Ortega and Sims question the Lyons' nanny, Ellen, who describes Richard as a loving father to the couple's two children. Flashbacks reveal that while both Nancy and Richard were architects, Nancy's far more successful career often kept her away from her family and put a strain on their marriage. The couple also often argued over Nancy's family, who looked down on Richard.

The police discover that Richard had recently purchased arsenic, which he says was for a fire ant infestation in the house. Richard suggests his lawyer, Guthrie, look into the possibility that Nancy may have committed suicide. Richard recounts how Nancy was full of life when they first met in college. He insists they were happily married until one particular family trip to Arizona, in which Nancy visited Bill who was in a treatment center for his drug and alcohol problems. After that trip, Nancy began isolating herself, quit her job and started seeing a therapist. Richard says it was at this time that he began an affair and filed for divorce, although he later returned to Nancy for the sake of their children. Meanwhile, the police receive anonymous letters claiming that Bill is responsible for poisoning Nancy. As they are unable to identify the sender, Richard remains the police's prime suspect.

After a grand jury indicts Richard, he is arrested and put on trial for Nancy's murder. During the trial, Guthrie accuses the police of overlooking Bill as a suspect. It comes to light from Nancy's therapy sessions that Bill and Nancy had an incestuous relationship when they were children. Guthrie also presents handwritten notes that were found among Nancy's belongings, in which she writes about how grateful she is to Richard for saving her from Bill, and shares her fears that Bill might have sexual desires towards her daughters. Bill insists that he and Nancy were on good terms before her death, and that their past incest was the result of a lonely childhood. To prove his innocence, Bill agrees to take a polygraph test, the result of which is inconclusive.

Ellen is called to the witness stand next and admits she had been concerned that Nancy was suicidal after Richard left her. Guthrie then produces an invoice for arsenic from a chemical plant with Nancy's signature on it. The owner of the plant is called to the stand where he testifies that while a woman did call to inquire about arsenic for a fire ant infestation, she never actually purchased any from him. Moreover, he is unable to confirm if Nancy was the woman in question as they never met in-person. When questioned about the invoice, the plant owner insists it is a forgery. A.D.A. Sims then brings in a handwriting expert who testifies that the aforementioned handwritten notes contain both Nancy and Richard's handwritings, suggesting that Richard had doctored the evidence. Despite Richard's insistence that he is innocent, the jury finds him guilty of first-degree murder and he is sentenced to life imprisonment.

== Cast ==
- Richard Thomas as Richard Lyon
- Tess Harper as A.D.A. Jerri Sims
- Glynnis O'Connor as Nancy Lyon
- Shawn Elliot as Det. Ortega
- Gary Frank as Bill Dillard Jr.
- Matthew Posey as Guthrie
- Ann Hearn as Ellen Chandler
- C.K. Bibby as Dillard Sr., Nancy's father
- Mitchell Laurance as Dr. Langston, Nancy's doctor
- Richard Olsen as Leonard Porter, a chemical plant owner
- Collin Wilcox Paxton as Mrs. Dillard, Nancy's mother
- Andrea Powell as Bridget Tyler, Richard's mistress
- Susan Rohrer as Mary Helen Dillard, Bill's wife
- Caroline Dollar as Allison, Richard and Nancy's older daughter
- Evan Rachel Wood as Anna (credited as Evan Wood), Richard and Nancy's younger daughter

== Production ==
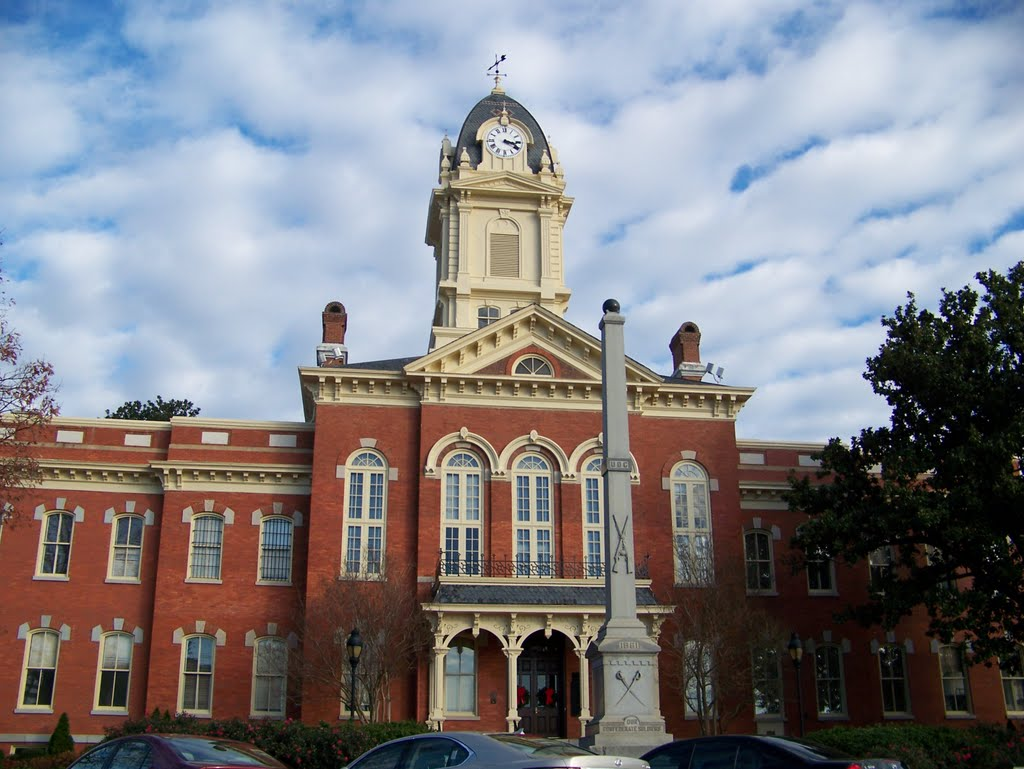
Union County Courthouse in Monroe, North Carolina

Death in Small Doses is a dramatization of the 1991 death of wealthy Dallas native Nancy Lyon by arsenic poisoning, a crime for which her husband Richard Lyon was the police's prime suspect. The film was directed by Sondra Locke and written by Scott Swanton. It was produced by Robert Greenwald Productions for ABC, with Robert Greenwald and Carla Singer serving as the executive producers. The creative team also included director of photography William A. Fraker, editor John W. Wheeler, and composer Jeff Rona.

Although Locke had already directed two theatrical films, Death in Small Doses was the actress-turned-director's television directorial debut. According to Locke, she had been struggling to get her next theatrical project off the ground when her agent suggested she try her hand at directing a television film instead. Locke read through a few scripts and picked Swanton's as her next project, citing the "mysterious quality" that set it apart from the other more straightforward scripts. She was especially drawn to the story's open-ended resolution which aligned with her own uncertainty about Richard's guilt. She explained:

I thought this will be interesting to tell a story as a director when I'm not quite sure as a director myself truly what he did or did not do. To the audience, then, it's like a game of, "Did he or didn't he?"

Locke said she underestimated how difficult directing for television would be, with the tight schedule keeping her on her toes and leaving little room for error. The true crime aspect posed its own challenges for the filmmaker, as adhering to the real-life case meant having to limit the film's dramatic scope. Locke also noted the directorial challenge of finding ways to keep the story moving while covering nearly 30 pages of courtroom scenes that had been pieced together from the real-life court transcripts.

Locke scheduled three days of rehearsals for the cast which enabled them to have extensive discussions about the source material. In the film, Richard and Nancy Lyon are played by Richard Thomas and Glynnis O'Connor respectively. Locke was keen to have Thomas portray the accused husband, feeling that the actor's "quality of innocence or directness" would play well into the ambiguity surrounding the character's guilt. For Thomas, he liked that the film set itself apart from other true crime dramas by leaving so much room for interpretation. Because her character mainly appears in sporadic flashbacks after dying at the start of the film, O'Connor described Nancy as "a real mystery" and felt that she had more creative freedom that usual in how she approached the role. O'Connor researched the physical effects of arsenic poisoning and worked with the production's makeup artist to ensure she looked the part.

Death in Small Doses was filmed over 18 days in and around February 1993. It was shot on location in both Charlotte and Monroe, North Carolina, with specific locales including the VanLandingham Estate and the Union County Courthouse, the latter of which was used to recreate the courtroom scenes. Local celebrities such as radio personalities Robert D. Raiford and Don Russell were cast in minor roles.

== Release and reception ==
Death in Small Doses premiered on ABC on January 16, 1995, in the 9:00–11:00 pm time slot. The film was originally scheduled to premiere one year earlier on January 10, 1994, but had its air date postponed by the network. According to a network representative, the delay was to avoid having a crowd of similar crime films airing around the same time.

=== Ratings ===
The film earned a national Nielsen rating of 11.0, where each ratings point represents 954,000 households, making it the 40th-highest-rated prime time broadcast for the week of January 16 to 22, 1995.

=== Critical response ===
Variety's Ray Loynd commended Locke's well-executed direction, Swanton's engaging story, and the cast's performance, with particular praise for the "utterly convincing" Thomas. However, Loynd found the lead characters unsympathetic and cold, which greatly detracted from his appreciation of the otherwise suspense-filled drama. Like Loynd, Faye Zuckerman's review in The Spokesman-Review credited the "high suspense" to Locke's direction and Thomas' performance. On the other hand, People's David Hiltbrand was not impressed by the lukewarm suspense, but nonetheless found the film engaging thanks mostly to Locke's confident visual command.

In a positive review, the Sun-Sentinel's Tom Jicha wrote that Death in Small Doses breaks conventional wisdom by proving that true crime dramas "can be provocative and gripping without being exploitive and titillating." Jicha praised Thomas' compelling turn as the dubious husband, and predicted that the uncertainty over Richard's guilt by the film's end would stir up debate among audiences. The ambiguous resolution also drew mixed reactions from critics: Tom Maurstad of The Dallas Morning News felt it appropriately reflected "how elusive and unknowable 'the truth' can be," while Jeff Plass of The News-Press felt it undermined the rest of the otherwise well-paced and intriguing film. Meanwhile, The San Diego Union-Tribune's John Freeman and The Grand Rapids Press' Ruth Butler both praised the film. The former enjoyed the pacing, while the latter concluded that the film "keeps your interest, is short on histrionics and takes a dignified route to the finish."

Other reviewers were more critical; Paul Droesch of TV Guide Magazine and Tammy C. Carter of The Times-Picayune both gave Death in Small Doses middling reviews. Droesch thought the film fumbled in its attempts to build suspense, while Carter thought it lacked substance despite a good performance from Thomas. John Koch's review in The Boston Globe found that the film spends too much time focusing on certain details of the investigation instead of building up the characters and human elements of the story. Overall, Koch was highly critical of Locke's direction, writing that she "makes a jumble of what might have been a fairly suspenseful, if all-too-familiar, network based-upon." John Voorhees of The Seattle Times thought the insufficient background on Nancy's life—seen only through flashbacks—was the script's undoing, as it ensures that the audience does not care about Nancy's death and thus the overall story.

== See also ==
- Poisoned Dreams – a 1993 true crime book about the murder of Nancy Lyon
