= Ode to Billie Joe =

1967 Bobbie Gentry song

- Side A of US single

Single by Bobbie Gentry

from the album Ode to Billie Joe
- B-side: "Mississippi Delta"
- Released: July 1967
- Studio: Capitol, Hollywood, California
- Genre: Blues, Country
- Length: 4:15
- Label: Capitol
- Songwriter: Bobbie Gentry
- Producers: Kelly Gordon, Bobby Paris

Bobbie Gentry singles chronology
"Stranger in the Mirror" (1966)	"Ode to Billie Joe" (1967)	"I Saw an Angel Die" (1967)

Official audio
- "Ode To Billie Joe" on YouTube

"Ode to Billie Joe" is a song by American singer-songwriter Bobbie Gentry released by Capitol Records in July 1967, and later used as the title track of her debut album. Five weeks after its release, the song topped Billboard's Pop singles chart. It also appeared in the top 10 of the Adult Contemporary and Hot R&B singles charts, and in the top 20 of the Hot Country Songs list.

The song takes the form of a first-person narrative performed in a half-spoken style by the daughter of a family, over sparse acoustic guitar accompaniment with strings in the background. It tells of a rural Mississippi Delta family's reaction to the news of the suicide of Billie Joe McAllister, a local boy to whom the daughter has a connection unbeknownst to her family. The song's cryptic lyrics received widespread attention, leaving its audience intrigued as to what the narrator and Billie Joe threw off the Tallahatchie Bridge. Gentry later clarified that she intended the song to portray the family's indifference to the suicide in what she deemed "a study in unconscious cruelty"; she also remarked that the object thrown was not relevant to the message.

The single "Ode to Billie Joe" was nominated for six Grammy Awards, with Gentry and arranger Jimmie Haskell winning three between them. Gentry's writing was adapted for the 1976 film Ode to Billy Joe. The song appeared on Rolling Stone's list of "The 500 Greatest Songs of All Time" and "Greatest Country Songs", while Pitchfork featured it on their 200 Best Songs of the 1960s list. In 2023, the song was selected by the Library of Congress for preservation in the National Recording Registry.

== Background and recording ==
Singer-songwriter Bobbie Gentry was born in Chickasaw County, Mississippi. After her parents divorced, she continued to live there with her paternal grandparents. At age 13, Gentry moved to California to live with her mother. She graduated from high school and entered UCLA as a philosophy major, before transferring to the Los Angeles Conservatory of Music. After she met Jody Reynolds at one of his concerts, Gentry took part in a recording session with him to sing two duets. Singer-songwriter Jim Ford introduced Gentry to record companies and music publishers. Ford took Gentry to Del-Fi Records, where he presented "Ode to Billie Joe" to the label's A&R man Barry White. Ford claimed credit for writing the song, telling White he had brought Gentry along because he felt he could not sing it himself. The composition impressed White, and Ford expressed an interest in selling it to him. White took the song to Del-Fi Records president Bob Keane, who did not like it and refused to make a purchase.

Capitol Records producer Kelly Gordon received Gentry's demonstration tape for "Mississippi Delta". Gordon liked it, and he asked for a B-side for the song. Gentry planned to sell "Ode to Billie Joe" to Capitol, and she decided that recording the demo herself was cheaper than using a professional singer. The song's recording happened soon after Gentry's session that yielded "Mississippi Delta" in February 1967, while Bobby Paris assisted her in the studio in exchange for guitar session work on some of his own studio recordings. Gentry intended to have Lou Rawls record the song. Larry Shayne, Gentry's publisher, warned Gordon against adding a rhythm section to the track. Shayne was a friend of David Axelrod's, Capitol Record's main A&R man. He sold Axelrod recording rights to the song for $10,000 (equivalent to $96,600 in 2025). Gordon liked Gentry's vocals on the demo, but he decided to add a sparse instrumental arrangement to the recording. Gordon called Jimmie Haskell, who prepared an arrangement for string sextet with four violins and two cellos. Jesse Erlich played one cello like a double bass. Haskell felt the song sounded like a film and decided to write the arrangement as if it were a score. Gordon then overdubbed Gentry's recording with the strings. He determined that "Ode to Billie Joe" would be the A-side of the single.

Haskell later claimed that a seven-minute unedited recording of the song existed, but that Gordon cut it to under five minutes for radio airplay. The existence of a seven-minute version has not been confirmed. Meanwhile, a manuscript of a draft of the song donated by Gentry to the University of Mississippi contained verses that were not included on the final recording.

== Content ==
"Ode to Billie Joe" takes the form of a first-person narrative by the young daughter of a Mississippi Delta family. It offers fragments of mealtime conversation on the day that a local boy, an acquaintance of the narrator, jumped to his death from a nearby bridge. The account is interspersed with everyday, polite, mealtime conversation. The song's last verse conveys the passage of events over the following year.

Excerpt of Bobbie Gentry's "Ode to Billie Joe"
As the narrator returns home, her mother tells the family of Billie Joe's suicide.

The song begins on June 3 with the narrator, her brother, and her father returning from farming chores to the family house for dinner (i.e., the midday meal, called "lunch" in other parts of the United States). After reminding them to wipe their feet, the mother announces she has received news from Choctaw Ridge: "Billie Joe McAllister jumped off the Tallahatchie Bridge." The verse is repeated through the song as the story develops to "heighten the mystery." Unmoved, the father comments that "Billie Joe never had a lick of sense" before asking for the biscuits and adding "there's five more acres in the lower 40 I've got to plow." The brother then expresses his surprise, but continues eating his meal.

The mother notices her daughter is distraught and not eating. She mentions the "young preacher" Brother Taylor visited the house earlier and that they would have dinner with him on Sunday. As an afterthought, the mother adds the preacher saw Billie Joe with a girl that "looked a lot" like the daughter and that "she and Billie Joe was throwin' somethin' off the Tallahatchie Bridge." A year later, the brother has married and moved to Tupelo, Mississippi, while the father has died of an unnamed virus. Though she expresses no sadness over her father's death, the daughter notices her mother is still distressed by it. Rather than consoling her mother, she routinely picks flowers and throws them off the bridge.

The song became a success because it created listener curiosity, given that Gentry did not mention what was thrown off of the bridge nor why Billie Joe committed suicide. It features perfect rhymes from the first to the sixth line of every verse. Meanwhile, the fifth and sixth lines of the song repeat the rhyme of "ridge" and "bridge" in every stanza. The song does not have a chorus.

=== Gentry's comments on the lyrics ===
In this photograph from the November 10, 1967, issue of Life magazine, Gentry crosses the Tallahatchie Bridge in Money, Mississippi.

In August 1967, Gentry told the Los Angeles Times she wanted to show "people's lack of ability" to empathize with others' "tragedy." She pointed out the mother, who noticed but did not understand her daughter's lack of appetite, while later the daughter is unaware of the similarity of her mother's behavior after the father dies. Gentry explained that both characters had "isolated themselves in their own personal tragedies" and remained unconcerned for the others. The songwriter compared the end product to a play. On the object thrown off the Tallahatchie Bridge, she commented that the audience had found more meanings than she had intended. Gentry mentioned that the most common theories of the time were an aborted baby, a wedding ring, a draft notice, and flowers. While she indicated that what happened at the bridge was the motivation behind Billie Joe's suicide, she also left it open to the listener's interpretation. Gentry said she had no answer, and her sole motivation was to show "people's apathy".

In an interview with the Associated Press in November 1967, Gentry called the song "a study in unconscious cruelty." She also said that audiences were still asking her what was thrown off the bridge rather than noticing "the thoughtlessness of people expressed in the song," adding that what had been thrown was unimportant. She said people suggested to her it was a draft card, or a bottle of LSD pills. The songwriter clarified that she knew what it was, but said she considered it irrelevant to the story and deliberately left that interpretation open. Gentry remarked that the song's message revolved around the "nonchalant way" the family discussed the suicide. She also said that what was thrown off of the bridge was included because it established a relationship between Billie Joe and the daughter, providing "a possible motivation for his suicide the next day". The interview ended with Gentry's suggestion that it could have been a wedding ring. Gentry told The New York Times in 1969: "I had my own idea what it was while I was writing it, but it's not that important. Actually it was something symbolic. But I've never told anyone what it was, not even my own dear mother."

== Release and reception ==
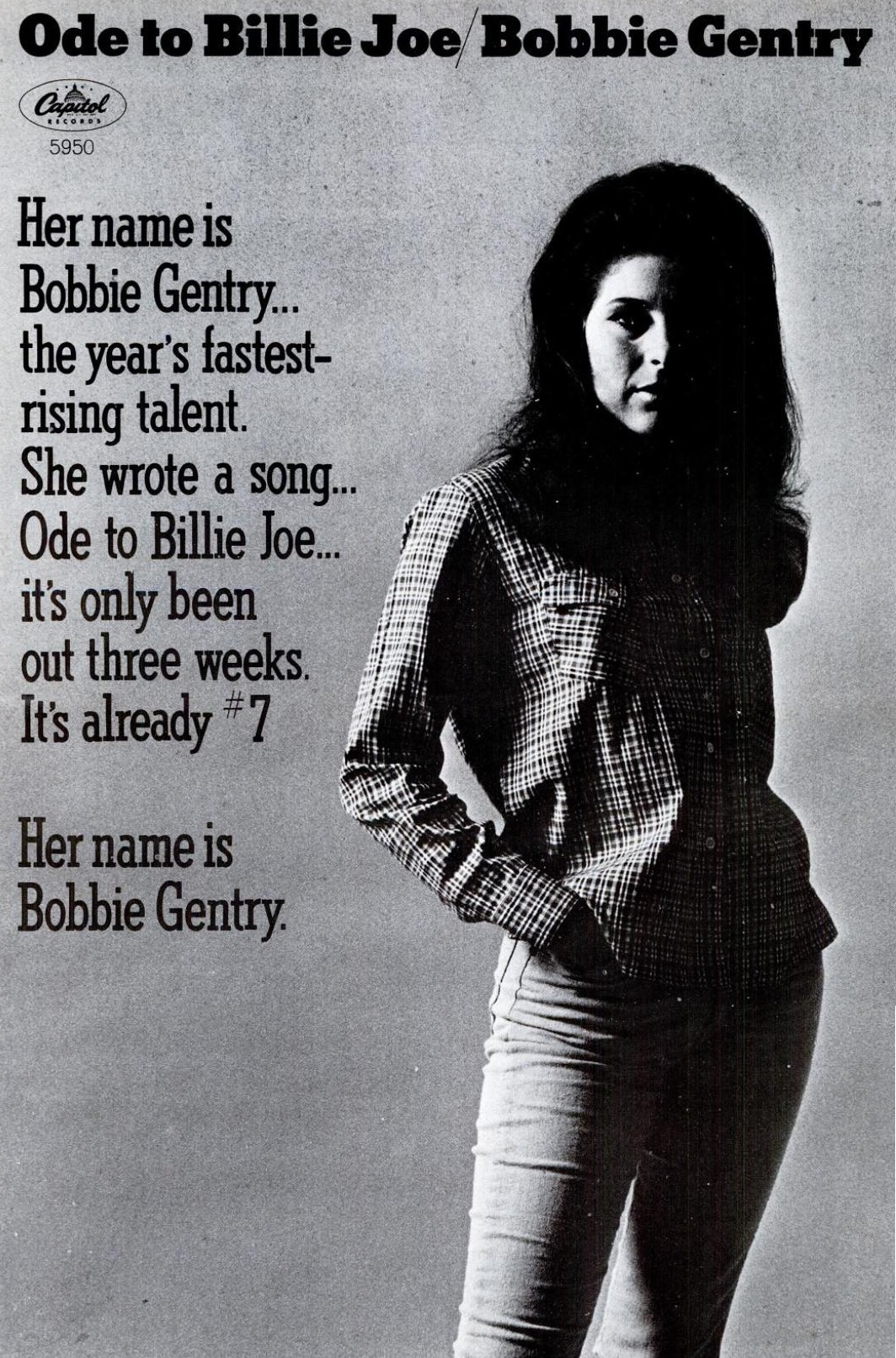
Capitol Records publicity poster featuring Gentry

The single "Mississippi Delta"-"Ode to Billie Joe" was released in July 1967. Paris was given a co-producer credit on the single with Gordon. Five weeks after its release, it reached number 1 on the Billboard Hot 100. By the sixth week, the single had sold one million copies. It also appeared at number 7 on Billboard's Adult Contemporary chart, at number 8 on the Hot R&B singles chart, and number 17 on the Hot Country Songs chart. Billboard's year-end chart placed the song at number 3, while Canada's RPM placed it at number 16.

In Australia, the song reached number 4 on Go-Set's National Top 40. Meanwhile, it peaked at number 6 on the Irish Singles Chart. On the New Zealand Listener chart, the song reached number 3.

In November 1967, Life published an article about the song's success after a visit with Gentry and her parents in Mississippi. Gentry showed the journalists a bridge in Money, Mississippi, that featured the characteristics of the one she wrote about as she clarified: "this is what I had in mind" she continued: "The river isn't very deep here, but the current is strong." Gentry was photographed crossing the bridge for the story. The single was nominated in six categories at the 10th Annual Grammy Awards and won three: Best Vocal Performance, Female (Bobbie Gentry), Best Contemporary Female Solo Vocal Performance (Bobbie Gentry), and Best Arrangement Accompanying Vocalist(s) Or Instrumentalist(s) (Jimmie Haskell). Additionally, Gentry won the Grammy for Best New Artist in part for her work on the single. By 1969, Gentry estimated the single had sold three million copies.

Gentry sued Paris to have his co-producer credit removed, claiming she was the recording's sole producer. Paris's credit was removed on the album release. Soon after she left Capitol Records, Paris sued Gentry for $100,000 and the label for $300,000 in punitive damages for failing to pay him one fifth of the royalties from the song's sales. Gentry and Paris testified against one another in the 1973 case. The jury awarded Paris one percent of the total royalties from "Ode to Billie Joe" and "Mississippi Delta", that amounted to $32,277.40 (equivalent to $234,100 in 2025). Gentry told Penny Anderson of the New York Times in 1974 that she originally produced "Ode To Billie Joe" and most of her recordings, adding that "a woman doesn't stand much chance in a recording studio. A staff producer's name was nearly always put on the records." Gentry expressed the desire to gain more control over the production of her songs and recordings.

=== Critical reception ===
The staff of Billboard welcomed the release as "fascinating material and performance" with a "potent lyric content that is worth the unusual length of the disk". The Los Angeles Times critic Leonard Feather considered it an "aural parallel" to the film In the Heat of the Night (1967), deeming them both "sardonic, knife-edge studies of human nature". Feather concluded Gentry added "a durable new dimension" to American "contemporary folklore". The New York Times commented on the success of the song four weeks after its release. Critic John S. Wilson felt the song was "a most unlikely candidate for success," as it was "long by radio programming standards" and he considered the topic "nothing startling, nothing strange, nothing particularly original," Wilson remarked the lyrics had "something to say about indifference ... which, after a couple of clarifying hearings, drifts off into the midst of forgotten poesy".

Nixon Smiley wrote in his piece for the Miami Herald that "not since William Faulkner wrote As I Lay Dying has anything come out of Mississippi as earthy and as fundamental" as 'Ode to Billie Joe.'" Smiley determined that upon "casual hearing there seems to be nothing great about the song, the lyrics or the rendition," but that it "captivated both the young and old." He noted disc jockeys were "surprised, even flabbergasted," and "sometimes disgusted".

The Montgomery Advertiser found the song "hard to classify." It remarked that it "has [a] rhythm and blues beat, and it's clever," and also noted the presence of mystery. The Fort Worth Star-Telegram called it "one of the most haunting songs of the year." The Honolulu Star-Bulletin wrote that "the lyrics are too much" and that "after a few listenings, the subject matter becomes clear, and the message gets across." The review pointed out that "musically, the song is as fine as it is lyrically inventive" and that it "grips with heretofore taboo themes."

In 2024, Rolling Stone ranked the song at #51 on its 200 Greatest Country Songs of All Time ranking.

== Legacy ==
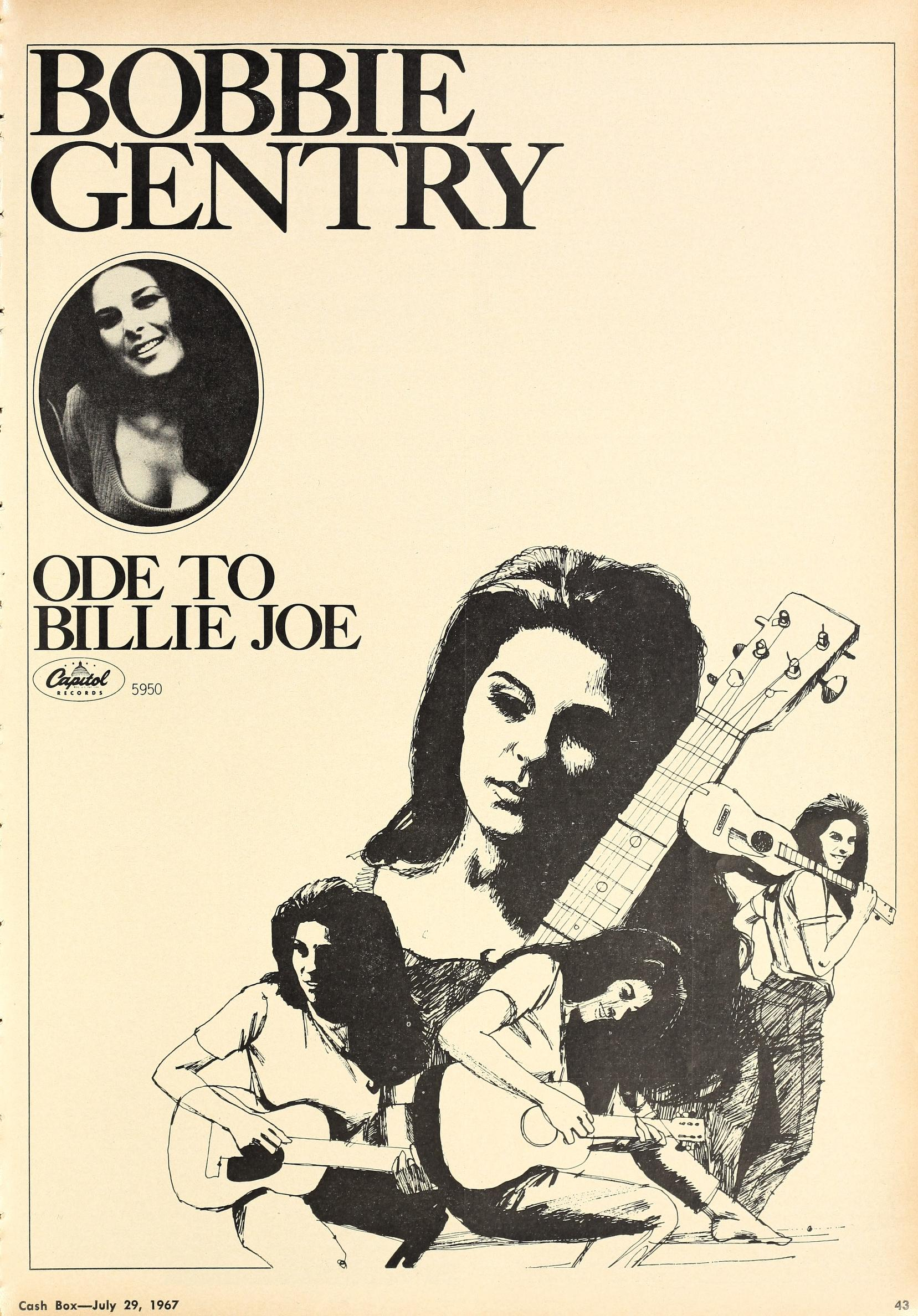
Advertisement for "Ode to Billie Joe", featured in Cashbox magazine in July 1967

Following the success of the single, Capitol Records received 500,000 pre-orders for Ode to Billie Joe, surpassing the label's record held by the Beatles' Meet the Beatles! Gentry began receiving offers to make a motion picture based on the song in 1967, but she rejected them, preferring to wait for an offer from a movie maker who would "portray Billie Joe and his girlfriend in a serious, sensitive manner." In 1975, Gentry and Shayne accepted an offer from Max Baer Jr., who decided to direct the film. Baer said his interest was to have two unknown young people "because the audience has to believe they are Bobbie and Billie Joe." The film would be shot on location in Mississippi with a budget of $1.5 million (equivalent to $8.97 million in 2025). Warner Bros. commissioned Herman Raucher to write an adaptation of the song for the upcoming film; Raucher's adaptation and novel were both titled Ode to Billy Joe. Gentry was present during the shooting and contributed a musical score. At the time of the production, she told United Press International that the film would "answer many questions left unanswered by the song." The film starred Robby Benson as Billy Joe and Glynnis O'Connor as Bobbie Lee. It was released in 1976. In the adaptation, the pair throw a rag doll off of the bridge, while a homosexual experience with the owner of the sawmill is established as the reason for Billy Joe's suicide.

"Ode to Billie Joe" reappeared on the charts in 1976. It charted at number 65 on the Billboard Hot 100, and in Canada at numbers 92 and 42 on the RPM Top Singles and Adult Contemporary charts, respectively.

After hearing "Ode to Billie Joe" on the radio, Tony Joe White was inspired to write songs. White felt that his own life experience resembled that of Billie Joe, as he inhabited a similar place during his childhood and he remarked that the song was "real." Soon after, White composed "Polk Salad Annie" (1969). By 1969, Leflore County established a fine of $180 (equivalent to $1,600 in 2025) for people who jumped off the Tallahatchie Bridge and the other bridges of the area. The county estimated that between 40 and 50 men had jumped off the 20-foot-high (6.1 m) structure, but none had died. The bridge collapsed in June 1972 after a fire and a new one was built in its place. In 2013, a memorial marker for the song was added south of the new bridge as part of the Mississippi Country Music Trail.

Rolling Stone included "Ode To Billie Joe" at number 419 on its 2003 500 Greatest Songs of All Time list. The publication also listed it at number 47 on its 100 Greatest Country Songs in 2014; Richard Gehr deemed the track a "sultry country blues that drifts downstream on Gentry's ominous acoustic guitar." Meanwhile, Pitchfork placed it at number 144 on its 200 Best Songs of the 1960s list. The song was selected by the Library of Congress for preservation in the National Recording Registry in 2023, based on its "cultural, historical or aesthetic importance in the nation's recorded sound heritage."

In 1999, the 1967 recording of "Ode to Billie Joe" by Bobbie Gentry on Capitol Records was inducted into the Grammy Hall of Fame.

=== Other versions ===
In August 1967, Margie Singleton released a cover of the song that reached number 40 on Billboard's Hot Country Singles. Ray Bryant's version (an instrumental) reached number 89 on Billboard's Hot 100 and number 34 on their Adult Contemporary chart soon after. King Curtis charted with his cover (another instrumental version) at number 28 on the Billboard Hot 100, also in 1967, and at number 6 on the R&B chart. Also in 1967, Joe Dassin released a cover of the song in French, entitled "Marie-Jeanne." In the song, the main character is a man, while Marie-Jeanne jumps off of the Garonne bridge.

A parody by Bob Dylan entitled "Clothes Line Saga", originally recorded in 1967, was released on the 1975 album The Basement Tapes. It mimicked the conversational style of "Ode to Billie Joe" with lyrics concentrating on routine household chores. The shocking event buried in all the mundane details is a revelation that "The Vice-President's gone mad!." Dylan's song was originally titled "Answer to 'Ode'".

Bobbie Gentry re-recorded the song for the film Ode to Billy Joe, with the spelling of the name changed to "Billy." Gentry stated that the original spelling had been a typographical error; this is corroborated by her original handwritten lyrics of the song. "Ode to Billy Joe - Main Title" was issued as a single in April 1976. It peaked at No. 65 on the US Billboard Hot 100 chart. Capitol Records, Gentry's label when the original 1967 recording was released, reissued it as a single in June 1976 to capitalize on the film's success.

Sinéad O'Connor performed the song in 1995 on the compilation album Help, a fundraiser for the charity War Child. This downtempo version of the song includes a brief sample of a wailing baby after the words "she and Billy Joe was throwing something off the Tallahatchie Bridge."

A 2008 episode of Saturday Night Live parodied the song where Kristen Wiig and host Paul Rudd play a married singer-songwriter couple who perform "Ode to Tracking Number." Jill Sobule's album California Years (2009) featured "Where is Bobbie Gentry?", which used the same melody in a lyrical sequel. The narrator, seeking the reclusive Gentry, claims to be the abandoned child of Gentry and Billie Joe. In 2016, Lorrie Morgan covered the song at a slower pace for her 2016 album Letting Go ... Slow. Morgan commented on recording the song with producer Richard Landis: "Richard purposely slowed the record down to make the musical passages through there really feel kind of spooky and eerie. Everything just felt so swampy and scary. Everybody has their own interpretation of that song and just what they threw off of the Tallahatchie Bridge."

== Charts ==
=== Bobbie Gentry ===
==== Weekly charts ====
Weekly chart performance of "Ode to Billie Joe" in 1967
Chart (1967)	Peak position
Australia (Go-Set)	4
Canada Top Singles (RPM)	1
Ireland (IRMA)	6
New Zealand (Listener)	3
UK Singles (Official Charts)	13
US Billboard Hot 100	1
US Adult Contemporary (Billboard)	7
US Hot Rhythm & Blues Singles (Billboard)	8
US Hot Country Songs (Billboard)	17
US Cash Box Top 100	1

Weekly chart performance of "Ode to Billie Joe" in 1976
Chart (1976)	Peak position
Canada Adult Contemporary (RPM)	42
Canada Top Singles (RPM)	92
US Billboard Hot 100	54

Weekly chart performance of "Ode To Billy Joe - Main Title" in 1976
Chart (1976)	Peak position
US Billboard Hot 100	65

==== Year-end charts ====
Year-end chart performance of "Ode to Billie Joe"
Chart (1967)	Position
Canada (RPM)	16
US Billboard Hot 100	3

==== All-time charts ====
All-time chart performance of "Ode to Billie Joe"
Chart (1958–2018)	Position
US Billboard Hot 100	323

=== Other artists ===
Weekly chart performance of "Ode to Billie Joe" by diverse artists
Artist	Chart (1967)	Peak position
Ray Bryant	US Billboard Hot 100	89
Ray Bryant	US Adult Contemporary (Billboard)	34
King Curtis and the Kingpins
King Curtis and the Kingpins	Canada R&B (RPM)	26
King Curtis and the Kingpins	Canada Top 100 (RPM)	16
King Curtis and the Kingpins	US Billboard Hot 100	28
King Curtis and the Kingpins	US Hot R&B/Hip-Hop Songs (Billboard)	6
King Curtis and the Kingpins	US Cash Box Top 100	34
Margie Singleton	US Hot Country Songs (Billboard)	39

== See also ==
- "Harper Valley PTA"
