= Little Mo =

Little Mo may refer to:

- Maureen Connolly, American tennis player nicknamed "Little Mo"
  - Little Mo (film), a made-for-television biopic about Connolly, starring Glynnis O'Connor
- Little Mo Mitchell, a character from the UK television series EastEnders
- Little Missouri River (Arkansas), a river in Arkansas, U.S.
