= Blue Balloon =

Blue Balloon may refer to:

- Blue Balloon, a 2007 rock song performed by Ween and released on La Cucaracha (album)
- Blue Balloon (The Hourglass Song), a 1973 song written by Joseph Brooks for Jeremy (film)
