= Mississippi Delta (disambiguation) =

Mississippi Delta, part of the Mississippi embayment Mississippi River Delta Mississippi embayment (also includes the lime-green Mississippi Delta) Mississippi River Gulf Outlet Canal (MRGO)

Mississippi Delta may refer to:

- Mississippi Alluvial Plain, the entire alluvial plain of the Mississippi River, from the river mouth to southern Illinois
  - Mississippi embayment, the upper two-thirds of the Mississippi Alluvial Plain, between central Louisiana and southern Illinois
    - Mississippi Delta, a distinct cultural area in northwest Mississippi state; part of the Mississippi embayment
  - Mississippi River Delta, the confluence of the Mississippi River with the Gulf of Mexico in Louisiana
- Mississippi Delta AVA [not outlined on the inset map], an American Viticultural Area including portions of Louisiana, Mississippi, and Tennessee
- "Mississippi Delta" (song), a 1967 song by Bobbie Gentry

== See also ==
- Arkansas Delta
- Delta, Mississippi, a ghost town in the region known as the "Mississippi Delta"
