= Max Baer Jr. =

American actor, producer and director (born 1937)

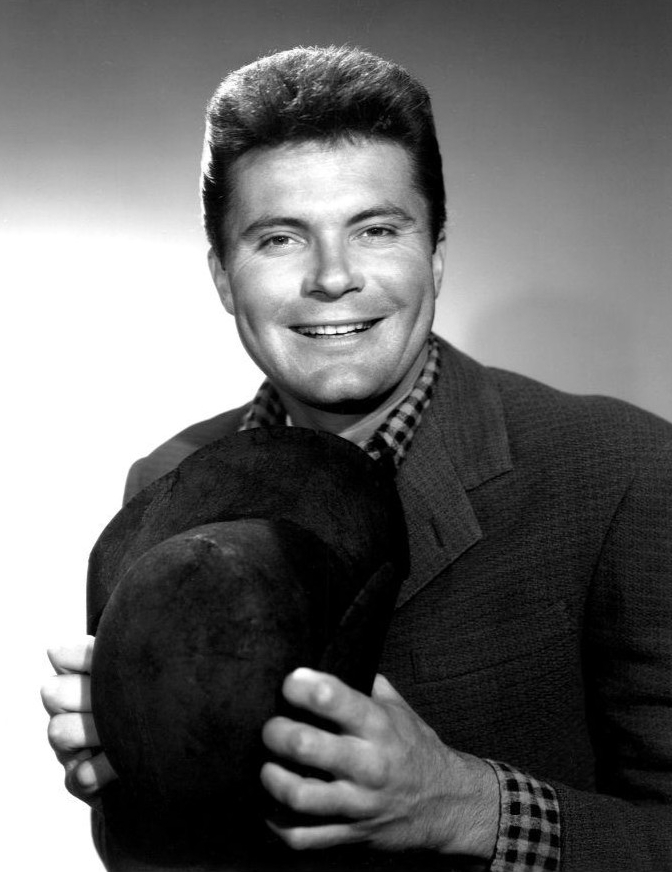
- As Jethro in 1962
- Born: Maximilian Adelbert Baer Jr. December 4, 1937 (age 88); Oakland, California, U.S.
- Occupations: Actor; producer; director; comedian; entrepreneur
- Years active: 1960–1991
- Spouse: Joanne Kathleen Hill (m. 1966; div. 1971)
- Father: Max Baer Sr.

Maximilian Adelbert Baer Jr. (born December 4, 1937) is an American former actor, producer, comedian, and director widely known for his role as Jethro Bodine, the dim-witted nephew of Jed Clampett (played by Buddy Ebsen) on The Beverly Hillbillies.

== Early life ==
Baer was born in Oakland, California, on December 4, 1937, the son of boxing champion Max Baer and his wife Mary Ellen Sullivan. His paternal grandfather was of German Jewish descent, and his mother was of Irish descent. His brother and sister are James Manny Baer and Maude Baer. His uncle was boxer and actor Buddy Baer.

He attended Christian Brothers High School in Sacramento, where he earned letters in four sports and twice won the junior title at the Sacramento Open golf tournament.

Baer served as a medical technician in the U.S. Air Force at Gunter Air Force Base, Alabama. Baer later earned a bachelor's degree in business administration from Santa Clara University, with a minor in philosophy.

Playing with Charlie Sifford, Baer later won the pro–am tournament at the 1968 Andy Williams–San Diego Open.

== Career ==
=== Early career ===
Baer began acting professionally in 1960 at Warner Bros., where he made appearances on television programs such as Maverick, Surfside 6, Hawaiian Eye, Cheyenne, The Roaring 20's, and 77 Sunset Strip. His career took off two years later, when he joined the cast of The Beverly Hillbillies.

=== The Beverly Hillbillies ===
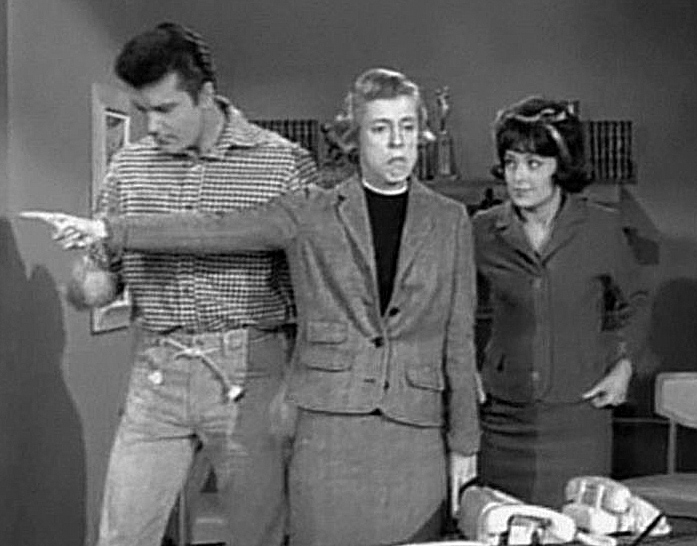
Baer, Nancy Kulp, and Sharon Tate (in a wig) in The Beverly Hillbillies (1965)

In 1962, Baer was cast in the role of the naïve but well-meaning Jethro Bodine, the son of Jed Clampett's cousin Pearl. He also played Jethro's twin sister Jethrine, though her voice was dubbed by actress Linda Kaye Henning.

He continued to take other parts during the nine-year run of The Beverly Hillbillies and appeared on the television programs Love, American Style, as well as in the Western A Time for Killing.

He declined to appear in the 1981 TV movie Return of the Beverly Hillbillies and his character was recast as a result.

=== Later career ===
Following the cancellation of The Beverly Hillbillies in 1971, Baer made numerous guest appearances on television, but he found his TV acting career hampered by typecasting. He concentrated on feature motion pictures, especially behind the camera, writing, producing, and directing. Baer wrote and produced the drama Macon County Line (1974), in which he played Deputy Reed Morgan, the highest-grossing movie per dollar invested at the time. Made for less than US$200,000, it earned upwards of US$30 million at the box office, a record that lasted until The Blair Witch Project surpassed it in 1999. Baer also wrote, produced, and directed the drama The Wild McCullochs (1975), and played the role of Culver Robinson.

Baer is credited with being one of the first to use the title of a popular song as the title and plot anchor of a film, acquiring the rights to Bobbie Gentry's hit song and producing the 1976 film Ode to Billy Joe, which he also directed. Made for US$1.1 million, the film grossed $27 million at the box office, and earned over US$2.65 million outside the US, US$4.75 million from television, and US$2.5 million from video. The film starred Robby Benson and Glynnis O'Connor.

Since the success of Ode to Billy Joe, the motion picture industry has produced more than 100 song-title movies. Baer pursued the rights to the hit song "Like a Virgin", recorded by the singer Madonna in 1984. When ABC tried to prevent him from making the film, he sued and won a judgment of more than US$2 million.

He directed the 1979 comedy Hometown U.S.A. before retiring to his home at Lake Tahoe, Nevada.

=== Other ventures ===
In 1985, Baer began investigating the gambling industry. He noted that tourists paid a 5–6 dollar admission to tour the "Ponderosa Ranch", in Incline Village, Nevada, which was the location for filming exterior scenes for episodes of TV's popular program Bonanza. The Ponderosa was a cattle ranch with horses, barns, Bonanza displays, restaurants, hay rides, and a wedding chapel, and tourists enjoyed the Ponderosa because of the Bonanza connection. Baer decided that tourists would also pay for something dealing with The Beverly Hillbillies. He began using his Jethro Bodine role as a marketing opportunity toward the gambling and hotel industry. Baer obtained the sublicensing rights, including food and beverage rights, to The Beverly Hillbillies from CBS in 1991. His business partner estimates the cost of obtaining the rights and developing the ideas at US$1 million. Sixty-five Beverly Hillbillies slot machines were built in 1999 and placed in 10 casinos.

In late 2003, Baer attempted the redevelopment of a former Walmart location in Carson City into a Beverly Hillbillies-themed hotel and casino, but was unsuccessful due to building code conflicts and other developers on the neighboring properties. On May 4, 2007, he announced the sale of the property and the purchase of another parcel just outside Carson City, in neighboring Douglas County, where he expected less resistance to his plans. Baer purchased a 2.5-acre (1.0 ha) parcel in north Douglas County for US$1.2 million, and would purchase an additional 20 acres (8.1 ha) once he obtained the required zoning variances. The plans were for a 40,000-square-foot (3,700 m^{2}) gambling area with 800 slot machines and 16 tables, flanked by various eateries, including "Jethro's All You Ken Et Buffet". The project would feature a showroom, cinema complex and a 240-room, five-story hotel.

Plans for Baer's casino included a 200-foot-tall (61 m) mock oil derrick spouting a 20- to 30-foot (9.1 m) flame.

As of July 2012, development of Jethro's Casino had been suspended. Ongoing litigation involving Baer, the developer and Douglas County has delayed the development of the project indefinitely.

In 2014, Baer sued CBS after claiming a secret deal with a Des Moines-based Jethro's BBQ was interfering with his opportunity to cash in on his role from the iconic television show. The lawsuit claims that Baer negotiated a deal with CBS in 1991 for the rights to use the fictional character and other motifs from the show to create a chain of restaurants, hotels, and casinos.

== Later life ==
He remained close friends with Buddy Ebsen until Ebsen's death from respiratory failure on July 6, 2003. Just before his acting mentor's death, he and Donna Douglas visited Ebsen in the hospital.

In January 2008, Baer's live-in girlfriend, 30-year-old Penthouse model Chere Rhodes, died from suicide in the 70-year-old's Lake Tahoe home. Her suicide note mentioned "relationship problems".

The 2015 death of co-star Donna Douglas left Baer as the last surviving regular cast member of The Beverly Hillbillies.

== Filmography ==
=== List of credits ===
Year	Title	Role	Notes
1960	Maverick	Ticket Taker / Chuck / Brazos	3 episodes — "Bundle from Britain" — "A Bullet for the Teacher" — "Kiz"
1960–1961	Surfside 6	Joe Wilk / Party Guest	2 episodes — "High Tide" (1960) — "Facts on the Fire" (1961)
1960–1961	Cheyenne	Callow / Bert McGuire / Pete	4 episodes — "Two Trails to Santa Fe" (1960) — "Duel at Judas Basin" (1961) — "The Beholden" (1961) — "The Frightened Town" (1961)
1960–1961	Hawaiian Eye	Ali / Bill Gorham	2 episodes — "Vanessa Vanishes" (1960) — "The Big Dealer" (1961)
1960–1961	77 Sunset Strip	Government Man / Luther Martell / Billy Blackston	3 episodes — "Double Trouble" (1960) — "The Corsican Caper" (1961) — "The Chrome Coffin" (1961)
1961	Bronco	Cowboy	Episode: "The Invaders
1961	Sugarfoot	Frank	Episode: "Angel"
1962	Follow the Sun	Tom Baylor	Episode: "A Choice of Weapons"
1962	It's a Man's World	1st GI	Episode: "Drive Over to Exeter"
1962–1971	The Beverly Hillbillies	Jethro Bodine	main role (273 episodes); TV Land Award for Favorite "Fish Out of Water" (2004)
1962–1971	The Beverly Hillbillies	Jethrine Bodine	11 episodes Jethro's twin sister
1967	A Time for Killing	Sergeant Luther Liskell	
1967	Dream Girl of '67	Himself (Bachelor Judge)	series regular (10 episodes)
1968	Hollywood Squares	Himself (Panelist)	recurring role (5 episodes)
1971	The Birdmen	Tanker	Television Movie
1972	Two for the Money	—N/a	Producer
1972–1973	Love, American Style	Rocky / Jackie Lee Rhodes	2 episodes — "Love and the Fullback" (1972) — "Love and the Games People Play" (1973)
1974	Macon County Line	Deputy Reed Morgan	also Producer/Writer
1975	The Wild McCullochs	Culver Robinson	also Director/Producer/Writer
1976	Ode to Billy Joe	—N/a	Director/Producer
1979	Fantasy Island	Big Jake Farley	Episode: "Nobody's There/The Dancer"
1979	Hometown U.S.A.	—N/a	Director
1980	The Asphalt Cowboy	Max Caulpepper	Television Movie
1982	The Circle Family	Hearst Circle	Television Movie
1984	Matt Houston	Andy MacKay	2 episodes — "Return to Nam: Part 1" — "Escape from Nam: Part 2"
1989	Murder, She Wrote	Johnny Wheeler	Episode: "Jack and Bill"
1991	Murder, She Wrote	State Trooper Boone Willoughby	Episode: "Who Killed J.B. Fletcher?"
2005	Biography	Himself (Interviewee)	Episode: "Buddy Ebsen"
