= Ode to Billy Joe (film) =

1976 film by Max Baer Jr.

- Theatrical release poster
- Directed by: Max Baer Jr.
- Screenplay by: Herman Raucher
- Based on: Ode to Billie Joe; 1967 song by Bobbie Gentry
- Produced by: Max Baer Jr.
- Starring: Robby Benson; Glynnis O'Connor
- Cinematography: Michel Hugo
- Edited by: Frank Morriss
- Music by: Michel Legrand
- Distributed by: Warner Bros. Pictures
- Release date: June 4, 1976
- Running time: 105 min
- Country: United States
- Language: English
- Budget: US $1.1 million

Ode to Billy Joe is a 1976 American drama film, directed and produced by Max Baer Jr., with a screenplay by Herman Raucher, and starring Robby Benson and Glynnis O'Connor. It is inspired by the 1967 hit song by Bobbie Gentry, titled "Ode to Billie Joe."

Made for $1.1 million, the film grossed $27 million at the box office, plus earnings in excess of $2.65 million in the foreign market, $4.75 million from television, and $2.5 million from video. Reviews were mostly positive.

Gentry's song recounts the day when Billie Joe McAllister committed suicide by jumping off the Tallahatchie Bridge on Choctaw Ridge, Mississippi. When Gentry discussed the screenplay with Raucher, she explained she did not know why the real person who inspired the character of Billie Joe had killed himself. Raucher thus had a free hand to pick a reason. His novelization of the story, published the year of the film's release as a movie tie-in, used the same rationale for the suicide.

== Plot ==
Set in 1953, the film explores the budding relationship between teenagers Billy Joe McAllister (Benson) and Bobbie Lee Hartley (O'Connor) (who corresponds to the unnamed narrator of the original song), despite resistance from Hartley's family, who contend she is too young to date. One night at a jamboree, McAllister gets drunk and seems nauseated and confused when entering a makeshift brothel behind the gathering. It turns out that in his inebriated state, he had sex with another man, later revealed to be his sawmill boss, Dewey Barksdale (James Best).

After his intimate encounter with Barksdale, Billy Joe disappears for several days. He then returns, and Bobbie Lee finally submits to her passions at a secluded spot near the bridge and encourages him to make love to her. Owing to his guilt, however, Billy Joe cannot consummate their relationship. He admits to Bobbie Lee that he has been with a man, and when she tries to reason that he was drunk, so maybe didn't have complete control of himself and didn't really know what was going on, he confesses that he knew what he was doing, knew it was a sin, and did it anyway because he wanted to. Tearfully, he bids her an enigmatic goodbye, and subsequently kills himself by jumping off the bridge spanning the Tallahatchie River. The local preacher, who saw Billy Joe and Bobbie Lee together, and other townsfolk spread the false story that Billy Joe committed suicide because he learned he had impregnated Bobbie Lee out of wedlock. For the sake of the family, Bobbie Lee's brother insists that she either quietly pursue an abortion or, if she insists upon having the baby, leave town.

In the film, as in the novel, the object thrown from the bridge is Bobbie Lee's ragdoll, symbolizing throwing away her childhood and innocence and becoming an adult.

Knowing that no one will ever believe that she and Billy Joe did not have sex and that she was never pregnant, Bobbie Lee decides to leave home. Very early one morning, with suitcase in hand, she walks to town to get a bus. On the way she meets Barksdale on the bridge, where he tells her that he is headed to her house to confess to her father and clear her name. She advises him against doing so, noting that revealing the truth would forever tarnish Billy Joe's reputation. He initially holds fast to his desire to confess, but Bobbie Lee calmly stresses that the news would further devastate Billy Joe's family and leave Barksdale himself subject to criminal prosecution. She also assures him that she does not mind her fate and then adds, "Oh, I'll be back before long; I'm only 15. What do I know of the world?" Finally agreeing with the girl's logic, he offers Bobbie Lee a ride to the bus station, which she graciously accepts. The film ends with the two of them walking across the bridge together.

== Cast ==
- Robby Benson as Billy Joe McAllister
- Glynnis O'Connor as Bobbie Lee Hartley
- Joan Hotchkis as Anna 'Mama' Hartley
- Sandy McPeak as Glenn 'Papa' Hartley
- James Best as Dewey Barksdale
- Terence Goodman as James Hartley
- Becky Bowen as Becky Thompson
- Simpson Hemphill as Brother Taylor
- Ed Shelnut as Coleman Stroud
- Eddie Talr as Tom Hargitay
- William Hallberg as Dan McAllister
- Rebecca Jernigan as Mrs Thompson

== Production ==
The June 12, 1975 issue of The Hollywood Reporter announced the completion of a $3.5 million deal between Max Baer Jr. and Warner Bros. Pictures for a film based on Bobbie Gentry's hit song, “Ode To Billie Joe.” Baer offered Gentry and her publisher a large percentage of the film's receipts, and paid Herman Raucher $250,000 and a share of the profits to write the screenplay. Raucher was chosen because he had written the hit film Summer of '42. Baer had intended to cast unknown actors in the lead roles of “Bobbie Lee Hartley” and “Billy Joe McAllister,” eventually picking Glynnis O'Connor and Robby Benson, who had previously starred together in the teen film Jeremy.

The July 2, 1975, issue of Variety announced that the locations for the film would include Gentry's hometown of Greenwood, Mississippi, along with other local communities.

Scenes at the old sawmill were filmed at Cross Lumber Company in Vaiden, Mississippi. The bridge featured in the film crossed the Yazoo River on County Road 512 near Sidon, Mississippi. It was later demolished and replaced by a modern concrete span in 1987, with plaques at both the eastern and western ends commemorating the film.

== Release date ==
The film premiered on June 2, 1976, at the Paramount Theatre in Jackson, Mississippi, as a benefit for the Mississippi Film Foundation. The premiere was attended by numerous dignitaries, including Mississippi Lieutenant Governor Evelyn Gandy. In honor of Gentry being the first woman to be inducted into the Mississippi Hall of Fame, and the film's release in 550 theaters across the Southern United States, June 3, 1976, was declared "Billy Joe Day" by Mississippi Governor Cliff Finch. Gandy officiated at the placing of a bronze tablet on the Tallahatchie Bridge near Rising Sun, Mississippi. The celebration was attended by stars Robby Benson and Glynnis O’Connor and producer Roger Camras. On the same day, a similar event was held in Los Angeles, California, to commemorate the opening of the film. Burbank Mayor Leland Ayers dedicated a 16-foot (5 m)-long replica of the Tallahatchie Bridge, constructed 25 feet (8 m) above Olive Avenue. Director Max Baer Jr. attended the event.

The film opened nationwide on June 4, 1976.

== Reception ==
Contemporary reviews were mixed. Ode to Billy Joe holds a 43% rating on Rotten Tomatoes based on seven reviews.

== Soundtrack ==
Ode to Billy Joe (Sound Track from Max Baer's Motion Picture)

Soundtrack album by Various Artists
- Released: May 10, 1976
- Length: 31:37
- Label: Warner Bros.
- Producer: Marshall Leib

Singles from Ode to Billy Joe (Sound Track from Max Baer's Motion Picture)
- 1. "Ode to Billy Joe - Main Title" Released: April 1976

Ode to Billy Joe (Sound Track from Max Baer's Motion Picture) is the soundtrack album to the film. It was released on May 10, 1976, by Warner Bros. Records.

The album was issued on CD for the first time in 2017 by California-based label Kritzerland.

Bobbie Gentry re-recorded her iconic hit song, "Ode to Billie Joe," for the film, with the spelling of the name changed to "Billy." Gentry stated that the original spelling had been a typographical error; this is corroborated by her original handwritten lyrics of the song.

=== Commercial performance ===
"Ode to Billy Joe - Main Title" was issued as a single in April 1976. It peaked at No. 65 on the US Billboard Hot 100 chart. Capitol Records, Gentry's label when the original 1967 recording was released, reissued it as a single in June 1976 to capitalize on the film's success. The album did not chart.

The original 1967 recording was on the Billboard chart for 20 weeks and was the Number 1 song for four weeks.

=== Track listing ===
Side one
No.	Title	Writer(s)	Length
1.	"Ode to Billy Joe - Main Title" (performed by Bobbie Gentry)	Bobbie Gentry, arranged by Jimmie Haskell	4:21
2.	"By the Pond"	Michel Legrand	1:15
3.	"On the Bridge"	Legrand	2:44
4.	"Night"	Legrand	3:40
5.	"Reflections"	Legrand	1:27
6.	"Morning Stillness"	Legrand	3:08
7.	"There'll Be Time (Love Theme)"	Legrand, Alan Bergman, Marilyn Bergman	2:13

Side two
No.	Title	Writer(s)	Length
1.	"Magnolia Turn-Around"	Thurman Box	1:45
2.	"Rattle Snake Daddy"	Hoyt Ming	2:05
3.	"Standing Pine Breakdown"	Morgan Gilmer	2:42
4.	"Memphis Thelma"	Sherrill Parks	2:29
5.	"Ode to Billy Joe - End Title Instrumental"	Gentry, arranged by Haskell	2:00
