= Sandy McPeak =

American actor (1936–1997)

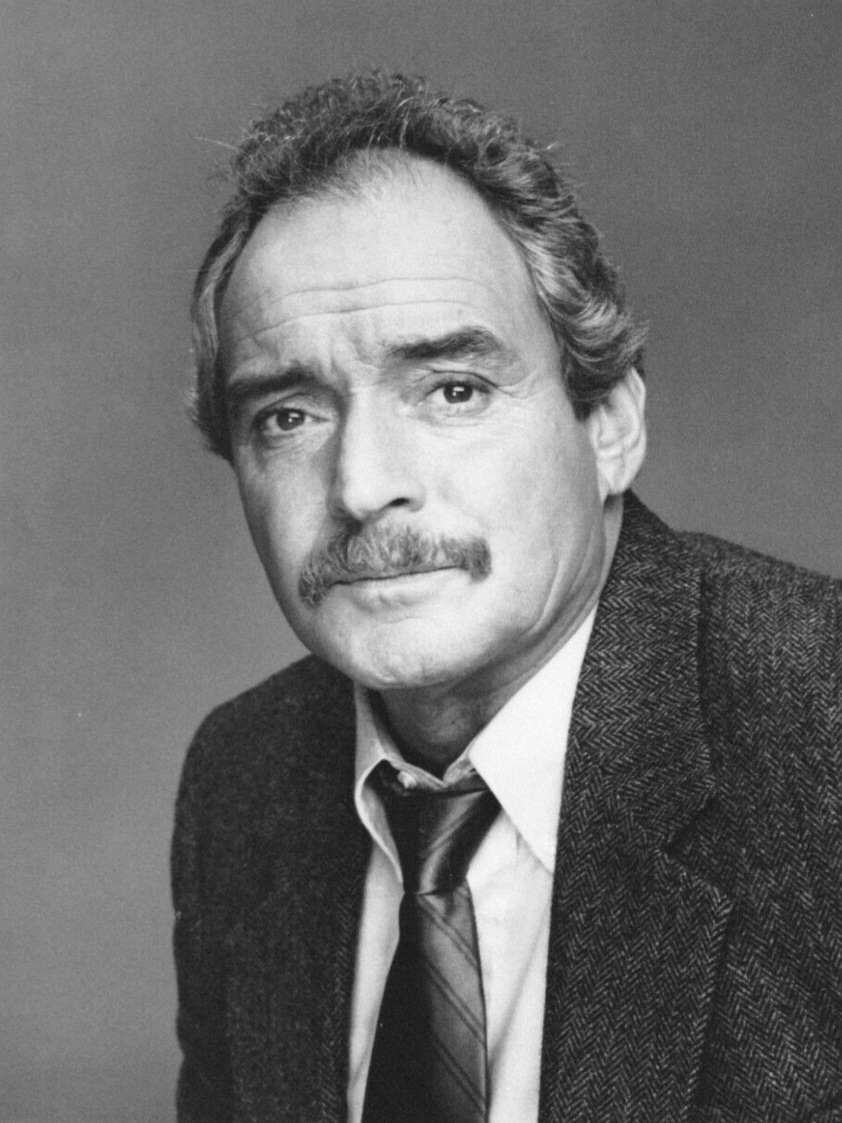
- McPeak in Blue Thunder, 1984
- Born: February 21, 1936; Indiana, Pennsylvania, U.S.
- Died: December 31, 1997 (aged 61); Nevada City, California, U.S.
- Occupation: Actor
- Years active: 1963–1994

Sandy McPeak (February 21, 1936 – December 31, 1997) was an American actor best known for such films and television series as Winnetka Road, L.A. Law, Centennial, Ode to Billy Joe, Patton, The Osterman Weekend, Kelly's Heroes and Blue Thunder.

== Biography ==
Sandy McPeak was born in Indiana, Pennsylvania on February 21, 1936.

He began his acting career in 1963 when he appeared in Palm Springs Weekend, and best known for such films and television series as Winnetka Road, L.A. Law, Centennial, Ode to Billy Joe, Patton, The Osterman Weekend, Kelly's Heroes and Blue Thunder.

== Death ==
McPeak died of a heart attack aged 61 in Nevada City, California on December 31, 1997.

== Filmography ==
=== Film ===
Year	Title	Role	Notes
1963	Palm Springs Weekend	Warren	Uncredited
1965	The Cincinnati Kid	Poker Player	Uncredited
1966	Not with My Wife, You Don't!	Sergeant Millican	Uncredited
1970	Patton	War Correspondent	
1970	Kelly's Heroes	Second Tank Commander	
1973	The Man Who Loved Cat Dancing	Ben	
1975	The Wild McCullochs	Rad	
1976	Ode to Billy Joe	Glenn "Papa" Hartley	
1976	Walking Tall: Final Chapter	Lloyd Tatum	
1979	The Onion Field	Mr. Powell	
1983	The Osterman Weekend	Walter Stennings	
1986	Inside Out	Lewis Curlson	
1990	Solar Crisis	Colonel Gurney	
1991	Born to Ride	Colonel James E. Devers	Last movie appearance

=== Television ===
Year	Title	Role	Notes
1977-1981	The Incredible Hulk	Jack Hollinger / Alex	2 episodes
1977	Tarantulas: The Deadly Cargo	Chief Beasley	TV movie
1978	Little House on the Prairie	Jacob Bond	Episode: "Whisper Country"
1978	Ruby and Oswald	District Attorney Henry Wade	TV film
1979	Disaster on the Coastliner	Hennessey	TV movie
1979	Centennial	Soren Sorenson	miniseries
1980	A Rumor of War	Joe Caputo	miniseries
1983	Knight Rider	Arthur Wexley	Episode: "Short Notice"
1983	Blood Feud	Captain Hamilton	Television film
1984	Blue Thunder	Captain Braddock	11 episodes
1985	Benson	Jack Gatling	season 7 episode 3 "uncle jack"
1986	Hunter	Waterson	Episodes: "The Beautiful & the Dead: Part 1" "The Beautiful & the Dead: Part 2"
1986	The A-Team	Captain Josh Curtis	2 episodes
1987	Murder, She Wrote	Morgan Rogers	Season 3 Episode 13 Crossed up
1987–1993	L.A. Law	George Cromwell / Peter Phillipson	4 episodes
1988-1989	Days of Our Lives	Orion Hawk	23 episodes
1990	Quantum Leap	Father John McRoberts	Episode: "Leap of Faith - August 19, 1963"
1991	Marilyn and Me	Darryl F. Zanuck	TV movie
1992	Coopersmith	Roy Beauford	TV movie
1994	SeaQuest 2032	Grant	Episode: "Greed for a Pirate's Dream"
1994	Winnetka Road	Sterling Grace	Series regular (final TV appearance)
