= Ode to Billie Joe (album) =

Studio album by Bobbie Gentry
- Released: August 21, 1967
- Recorded: c. February – July 28, 1967
- Studios: Whitney (Glendale, California); Capitol (Hollywood, California)
- Genre: Country
- Length: 30:18
- Label: Capitol
- Producer: Kelly Gordon

Bobbie Gentry chronology
Ode to Billie Joe (1967)	The Delta Sweete (1968)

Singles from Ode to Billie Joe
- 1. "Ode to Billie Joe" Released: July 10, 1967; 2. "I Saw an Angel Die" Released: September 11, 1967; 3. "Mississippi Delta" Released: October 5, 1967

Ode to Billie Joe is the debut studio album by American singer-songwriter Bobbie Gentry. It was released on August 21, 1967, by Capitol Records.

== Background ==
Despite performing regularly with her mother in the mid-60s, Gentry’s sole ambition originally was to write songs to sell to other artists, telling the Washington Post that she only sang on the recording of "Ode to Billie Joe" that she took to Capitol because it was cheaper than hiring someone to sing it. Gentry also brought "Mississippi Delta" to Capitol on the same demo tape and it was this recording, rather than "Ode to Billie Joe", that initially got her signed.

Gentry was officially signed to Capitol Records on June 23, 1967, and staff producer Kelly Gordon was given "Ode to Billie Joe" as his first full length production for the label. Both of Bobbie’s "demo" tracks became the album masters; the purchased recording of "Mississippi Delta" was the version issued, but "Ode to Billie Joe" had a string arrangement by Jimmie Haskell dubbed onto the original recording at Capitol. It was the day after the string session that Capitol’s A&R team decided definitively that "Ode to Billie Joe" would be the A-side.

Following the single's success, the rest of the album was quickly assembled from a selection of demos Gentry had already recorded guitar and vocal tracks for, with overdubs being completed in a matter of days at Capitol. The result was a unique combination of blues, folk and jazz elements, that furthered Gentry’s recollections of her home, and felt more like a concept album than a hastily assembled collection of songs. Capitol pre-ordered 500,000 copies – the largest pressing of a debut album in the label's history at that point. The album was in stores less than a month after it was completed.

== Recording ==
The initial sessions for what would become Gentry's debut album took place prior to her being signed to Capitol Records. These sessions were produced by Gentry and Bobby Paris and most likely took place at Paris' Whitney Recording Studio in Glendale, California. "Mississippi Delta" and "Ode to Billie Joe" were recorded circa February and March 1967, respectively, with the string arrangement for "Ode to Billie Joe" being recorded sometime in June at Capitol Studios. "Lazy Willie", "Bugs", and "Chickasaw County Child" were recorded on May 24, and would be overdubbed at Capitol Studios on July 27.

Following the success of "Ode to Billie Joe", Gentry recorded acoustic demos of "I Saw an Angel Die", "Papa, Won't You Let Me Go to Town with You", "Sunday Best", "Hurry, Tuesday Child", and "Niki Hoeky" on July 26. These demos would be overdubbed on July 27 and 28, forming the rest of the album.

== Critical reception ==
Professional ratings
Review scores
Source	Rating
AllMusic	4.5/5 stars
The Encyclopedia of Popular Music	3/5 stars
The Rolling Stone Album Guide	3/5 stars

In the issue dated September 2, 1967, Billboard's review said, "This album, based on the phenomenal single, "Ode to Billie Joe", has got to be one of the top albums of the year. Bobbie proves to be much more than a flash in the pan. Each of her emotional ballads are standouts — especially the haunting "Hurry Tuesday Child". And Miss Gentry's uptempo jazz waltz, "Papa, Won't You Take Me to Town with You", could step out as a single."

Cashbox also published a review on September 2, saying, "Bobbie Gentry follows up her No. 1 chart single, "Ode to Billie Joe", with an album of the same title. Included on the set, in addition to the title tune are, "Papa, Won't You Let Me Go to Town with You", "Chickasaw Country Child", "I Saw an Angel Die", and "Hurry, Tuesday Child". The disc figures to be a runaway best seller".

Record World named the album as one of their Albums of the Week, saying that "Sensation Bobbie Gentry is as good in album form as she is in single form or just plain form on her Ode to Billie Joe album. She's quite a remarkable entertainer."

Reviewing for AllMusic years later, critic Richie Unterberger wrote of the album, "Her vocals are poised and husky throughout the record, on which she was definitely on the right track — one that she was quickly diverted from, into more MOR-oriented sounds."

=== Accolades ===
10th Annual Grammy Awards

Year	Nominee / work	Award	Result
1968	Bobbie Gentry	Best New Artist	Won
1968	"Ode to Billie Joe"	Record of the Year	Nominated
1968	"Ode to Billie Joe"	Song of the Year	Nominated
1968	"Ode to Billie Joe"	Best Arrangement, Instrumental and Vocals	Won
1968	"Ode to Billie Joe"	Best Female Pop Vocal Performance	Won
1968	"Ode to Billie Joe"	Best Contemporary Female Solo Vocal Performance	Won
1968	"Ode to Billie Joe"	Best Contemporary Single	Nominated
1968	Ode to Billie Joe	Album of the Year	Nominated
1968	Ode to Billie Joe	Best Contemporary Album	Nominated
1968	Ode to Billie Joe	Best Engineered Recording, Non-Classical	Nominated

== Commercial performance ==
The album peaked at No. 1 on the US Billboard Top LP's chart. It was the only album to displace the Beatles’ Sgt. Pepper's Lonely Hearts Club Band from its 15-week reign at the top of the chart. It also peaked at No. 1 on the US Billboard Hot Country Albums chart and at No. 5 on the US Billboard Top Selling R&B Albums chart.

The album's first single, "Ode to Billie Joe", was released in July 1967, and peaked at No. 1 on the US Billboard Hot 100 chart, No. 7 on the US Billboard Top 40 Easy Listening chart, No. 8 on the US Billboard Top Selling R&B Singles chart, and No. 17 on the US Billboard Hot Country Singles chart. The single also saw international success, peaking at No. 1 in Canada on the RPM Top Singles chart, No. 6 on Australia's Kent Music Report Singles Chart, and No. 13 on the UK Singles Chart.

The album's second single, "I Saw an Angel Die", was released in September 1967, and failed to chart.

"Mississippi Delta" was issued as Gentry's debut single in Japan in October 1967, but did not chart.

== Reissues ==
In 2007, the album was made available for digital download.

In 2008, Australian label Raven Records released the album on CD, paired with 1969’s Touch 'Em with Love.

== Track listing ==
All tracks written by Bobbie Gentry, except as noted.

Side one
No.	Title	Recording date	Length
1.	"Mississippi Delta"	c. February 1967	3:05
2.	"I Saw an Angel Die"	July 26, 1967	2:56
3.	"Chickasaw County Child"	May 24, 1967	2:45
4.	"Sunday Best"	July 26, 1967	2:50
5.	"Niki Hoeky" (Jim Ford, Lolly Vegas, Pat Vegas)	July 26, 1967	2:30

Side two
No.	Title	Recording date	Length
1.	"Papa, Won't You Let Me Go to Town with You?"	July 26, 1967	2:30
2.	"Bugs"	May 24, 1967	2:05
3.	"Hurry, Tuesday Child"	July 26, 1967	3:52
4.	"Lazy Willie"	May 24, 1967	2:36
5.	"Ode to Billie Joe"	c. March 1967	4:15

== Personnel ==
Adapted from the album liner notes and back cover.

- Bobbie Gentry – vocals, acoustic guitar
- Kelly Gordon – producer
- Jimmie Haskell – arranger, conductor
- George Fields – harmonica & harp
- Harold Diner, Barrett O’hara – trombone
- Jack Sheldon – trumpet
- James Burton, Mike Deasy – guitar
- Norman Serkin, Joseph Saxon, Jesse Ehrlich – cello & bass
- Carl Nashan. Ralph Schaeffer, William Kurasch – violin
- Dale Anderson – percussion
- Earl Palmer – drums
- Joe Polito – engineer
- Ed Simpson – cover photo

Original demo recorded by Bobby Gentry and Bobby Paris, early 1967. Overdub sessions made at Capitol Studio C. Hollywood, California, between May & July 1967.

== Chart positions ==
Album

Year	Chart	Chart position
1967	US Hot Country Albums (Billboard)	1
1967	US Top LP's (Billboard)	1
1967	US Top Selling R&B LP's (Billboard)	5
1967	Canadian RPM Top LPs	17

Singles

Year	Single	Chart	Chart position
1967	"Ode to Billie Joe"	Australia (Kent Music Report)	6
1967	"Ode to Billie Joe"	Canada Top Singles (RPM)	1
1967	"Ode to Billie Joe"	UK Singles Chart (OCC)	13
1967	"Ode to Billie Joe"	US Hot 100 (Billboard)	1
1967	"Ode to Billie Joe"	US Hot Country Singles (Billboard)	17
1967	"Ode to Billie Joe"	US Top 40 Easy Listening (Billboard)	7
1967	"Ode to Billie Joe"	US Top Selling R&B Singles (Billboard)	8
