= Why Me? (1984 film) =

- Genre: Drama
- Based on: Why Me? by Leola Mae Harmon
- Screenplay by: Dalene Young
- Directed by: Fielder Cook
- Starring: Glynnis O'Connor; Armand Assante; Craig Wasson; Annie Potts; Lin Shaye
- Music by: Billy Goldenberg
- Country of origin: United States
- Original language: English

Production
- Executive producers: Malcolm Stuart; Dalene Young
- Producers: Lowell Mate; Michael Moyse; Robert Papazian; Irwin Steinberg
- Cinematography: Woody Omens
- Editor: Parkie L. Singh (as Parkie Singh)
- Running time: 100 minutes
- Production company: Lorimar Television

Original release
- Network: ABC
- Release: March 12, 1984

Why Me? is a 1984 American made-for-television film directed by Fielder Cook and starring Glynnis O'Connor and Armand Assante.

== Premise ==
Air Force nurse Leola Mae Harmon is about to leave the military in 1968 when her face is terribly disfigured in a car crash in which she also loses her baby, while the drunk driver who caused the crash receives leniency. Traumatized further when her marriage breaks up after the accident, Leola falls under the care of Air Force surgeon James Stallings. Stallings fights the service's medical bureaucracy to repair Leola's face with several radical procedures over 20 reconstructive surgeries, while Leola befriends a disfigured boy hospitalized in the same facility. Stallings and Leola also fall in love by the time Dr. Stallings's work achieves the final results for her.

The film is based on the real-life story of Leola Mae Harmon and James Stallings, who married in 1971. The marriage lasted five years; Leola remarried in 1982 and continued her nursing career. She died of multiple organ failure in 1998. Stallings became a noted plastic and voice surgeon who pioneered vocal reconstructive surgery. He, too, remarried, but after being diagnosed with Epstein-Barr Syndrome in 1987, the disease interfered with his work until his suicide in 1991.
