= Gary Frank (actor) =

American actor

Gary Bruce Frank
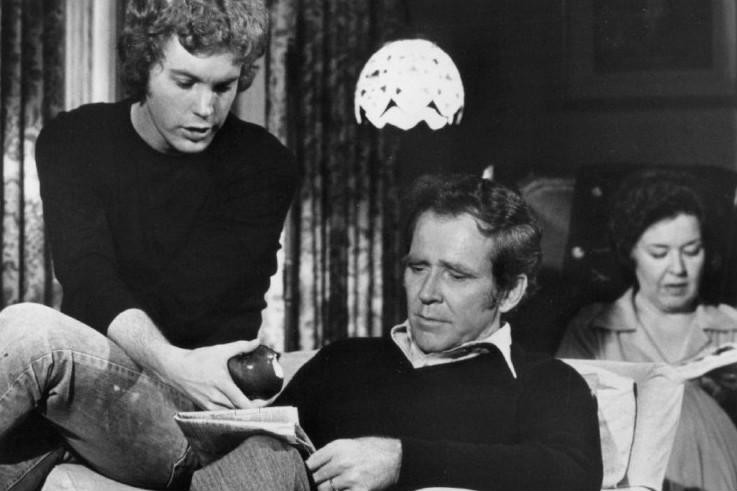
- L-R: Gary Frank, James Broderick and Sada Thompson on TV's Family (1976)
- Born: October 9, 1950 (age 76); Spokane, Washington, U.S.
- Spouse: Carroll Newman (m. 1976)
- Children: 1
- Relatives: Joey Newman (nephew)
- Awards: Primetime Emmy Award for Outstanding Supporting Actor in a Drama Series (1977)

Gary Frank (born October 9, 1950) is an American actor who won an Emmy Award for his performances on the 1976-1980 TV series Family, which also starred James Broderick, Sada Thompson, Meredith Baxter, and Kristy McNichol.

== Career ==
Frank starred with Glynnis O'Connor in the short-lived 1974 CBS series Sons and Daughters, a drama about young people in a changing society.

Frank appeared in the film Deadly Weapon. He starred in three episodes of Remington Steele as well as episodes of The Streets of San Francisco; T. J. Hooker; Charlie's Angels; Fantasy Island; The Love Boat; Hunter; Magnum, P.I.; Murder, She Wrote; L.A. Law; Hill Street Blues; Friday the 13th: The Series; and Star Trek: Deep Space Nine.

He played bombardier Major Thomas Ferebee in the TV film Enola Gay: The Men, the Mission, the Atomic Bomb, co-starred in the TV Christmas film The Gift opposite Glenn Ford, and appeared on two episodes of Matlock.

As of 2024, Gary lives in Los Angeles with his wife, Carroll Newman.

== Filmography ==
=== Film ===
Year	Title	Role	Notes
1987	Enemy Territory	Barry	
1989	Deadly Weapon	Lieutenant Dalton	
1992	The Distinguished Gentleman	Iowa	
1999	Chuck E. Cheese in the Galaxy 5000	Reporter	Direct-to-video

=== Television ===
Year	Title	Role	Notes
1974	Sons and Daughters	Jeff Reed	10 episodes
1975	Love Is Not Forever	Jeff	Television film
1975	Ironside	Ted Glenville	Episode: "The Faded Image"
1975	Medical Center	Steve	2 episodes
1976	The Streets of San Francisco	Winston Styles	2 episodes
1976–1980	Family	Willie Lawrence	86 episodes
1977–1981	The Love Boat	Dr. Barry Mason / Stanley Adams	3 episodes
1979	The Gift	Pete Devlin	Television film
1980	Enola Gay: The Men, the Mission, the Atomic Bomb	Thomas Ferebee	Television film
1980	Charlie's Angels	Ted Grainger	Episode: "To See an Angel Die"
1980	The Night the City Screamed	Ron Farrell	Television film
1981	Midnight Lace	Brian Preston	Television film
1981	Norma Rae	Reuben	Television film
1982	T. J. Hooker	Brett Williams	Episode: "The Streets"
1982	Matt Houston	Wendell Murdoch	Episode: "Shark Bait"
1982	Fantasy Island	Jack Oberstar	2 episodes
1983	Hart to Hart	Dave Ripley	Episode: "Chamber of Lost Harts"
1983	Emergency Room	Dr. Paul Klein	Television film
1983	Sutters Bay	Doc Medford	Television film
1983	Whiz Kids	Carl Fletcher	Episode: "Deadly Access"
1983	Trapper John, M.D.	Dr. Wesley Dunbar	Episode: "The Final Cut"
1983	Hill Street Blues	Gerry Gaffney	2 episodes
1983–1986	Remington Steele	Detective James Jarvis	3 episodes
1984	Hotel	Luther	Episode: "Trials"
1985	Misfits of Science	Eddie	Episode: "Sonar... and Yet So Far"
1986	Murder, She Wrote	Lee Callahan	Episode: "Trial by Error"
1986	Scarecrow and Mrs. King	Carmine Davis	Episode: "It's in the Water"
1986	Magnum, P.I.	Jeff Spangler	Episode: "Death and Taxes"
1986, 1989	Matlock	Various roles	2 episodes
1988	Friday the 13th: The Series	Winston Knight	Episode: "Double Exposure"
1988	Hunter	Alan Rawling	2 episodes
1989	Flying Blind	Jason	Television film
1989	Peaceable Kingdom	Tyler	Episode: "Aardvark"
1990	Unspeakable Acts	Neil Harrison	Television film
1990	Sunset Beat	Hobbs	Episode: "One Down, Four Up"
1990	People Like Us	Hubert Altemus	Television film
1991	Dragnet	Raymond Younger	Episode: "Armored Truck 211s"
1991	Midnight Caller	Hank Scanlon	Episode: "Blood Ties"
1992	Deliver Them from Evil: The Taking of Alta View	Dr. Garrick	Television film
1992	Getting Up and Going Home	Scott Stevens	Television film
1992	Batman: The Animated Series	Daniel Mockridge	Voice, episode: "If You're So Smart, Why Aren't You Rich?"
1993	Picket Fences	Dr. Thomas Bufell	Episode: "The Body Politic"
1993	Nurses on the Line: The Crash of Flight 7	Len	Television film
1994	L.A. Law	Richard Visser	Episode: "Cold Cuts"
1994	Untamed Love	Mr. Eldridge	Television film
1994	Silk Stalkings	Seaside Strangler	2 episodes
1995	Death in Small Doses	Bill Dillard Jr.	Television film
1995	Under Suspicion	Paul Maxline	Episode: "Kinky Murder"
1997	Pacific Blue	Lenny Petrani	Episode: "Lost and Found"
1997	Prison of Secrets	Larry Schaffer	Television film
1997	Star Trek: Deep Space Nine	Yedrin Dax	Episode: "Children of Time"
1997	House of Frankenstein	Mr. Endicott	2 episodes
1998	Profiler	James Davison	Episode: "The Root of All Evil"
1998	Like Father, Like Santa	Smitty	Television film
1998	Brimstone	Cable Access Show Host	Episode: "Executioner"
