= The Wild McCullochs =

Film directed by Max Baer, Jr.

- Theatrical release poster
- Directed by: Max Baer Jr.
- Written by: Max Baer Jr.
- Produced by: Max Baer Jr.
- Starring: Forrest Tucker; Julie Adams; Max Baer Jr. Janice Heiden; Dennis Redfield; Don Grady
- Cinematography: Fred J. Koenekamp
- Edited by: David Berlatsky
- Music by: Ernest Gold
- Production company: Max Baer Productions
- Distributed by: American International Pictures
- Release date: May 21, 1975
- Running time: 93 minutes
- Country: United States
- Language: English
- Box office: $1,876,000

The Wild McCullochs is a 1975 American drama film written and directed by Max Baer Jr., his directorial debut, and starring Forrest Tucker, Julie Adams, Max Baer Jr., Janice Heiden, Dennis Redfield and Don Grady. The film was released on May 21, 1975, by American International Pictures.

== Synopsis ==
The Wild McCullochs is a family drama set in Texas, beginning in 1949 and spanning several years. It centers on J.J. McCulloch (Forrest Tucker), a tough, self-made trucking company owner and heavy-drinking patriarch who rules his family with an iron fist and domineering ways. J.J.'s overbearing control, frequent brawls, and authoritative attitude create constant tension and conflict. His sons and daughter chafe under his rule, often blaming him for their personal failures, misfortunes, and the family's unraveling dynamics—whether it's failed relationships, rebellious behavior, or other setbacks.

The film explores themes of generational clash, misplaced resentment, and the destructive impact of unchecked patriarchal authority, ultimately showing how J.J.'s bossy nature contributes to the breakdown of family bonds while the children grapple with their misguided tendency to pin everything that goes wrong on their father.

== Cast ==
- Forrest Tucker as J.J. McCulloch
- Julie Adams as Hannah McCulloch
- Max Baer Jr. as Culver Robinson
- Janice Heiden as Ali McCulloch
- Dennis Redfield as Steven McCulloch
- Don Grady as R.J. McCulloch
- Chip Hand as Gary McCulloch
- William Demarest as Father Gurkin
- Harold J. Stone as George
- Vito Scotti as Tony
- Sandy McPeak as Rad
- Lillian Randolph as Missy
- Mike Mazurki as Cliff Randall
- Billy Curtis as Charlie P.
- Biff Elliot as Ralph
- Kenneth Tobey as Larry Carpenter
- Doodles Weaver as Pop Holson
- Timothy Scott as Pervert
- James Gammon as 1st Police Officer
- Frederic Downs as Drunk
- Joe Sawyers as Toby
- Matthew Greene as Al
- Mark Hall as Ted
