= I Saw an Angel Die =

Single by Bobbie Gentry

from the album Ode to Billie Joe
- B-side: "Papa, Woncha Let Me Go to Town with You"
- Released: September 11, 1967
- Recorded: 1967
- Studio: Whitney Recording (Glendale, California); Capitol (Hollywood)
- Genre: Country
- Length: 2:56
- Label: Capitol
- Songwriter(s): Bobbie Gentry
- Producer(s): Kelly Gordon

Bobbie Gentry singles chronology
"Ode to Billie Joe" (1967)	"I Saw an Angel Die" (1967)	"Mississippi Delta" (1967)

"I Saw an Angel Die" is a song written and performed by American singer-songwriter Bobbie Gentry. It was released on September 11, 1967, as the second single from her debut album Ode to Billie Joe. The song was produced by Kelly Gordon and features a string arrangement by Jimmie Haskell.

== Commercial performance ==
The single was released in September 1967 following the success of Gentry's debut single "Ode to Billie Joe". Surprisingly, the single failed to chart.

== Track listing ==
- Capitol 5992
1. I Saw an Angel Die (Bobbie Gentry) – 2:56
2. Papa, Woncha Let Me Go to Town with You (Gentry) – 2:30

== Personnel ==
Adapted from the single liner notes.

- Bobbie Gentry – vocals, guitar
- Kelly Gordon – producer
- Jimmie Haskell – string arrangement, string conductor

== Covers ==
The song was covered by singer/actress Lainie Kazan, and appeared on her album Love Is Lainie, as the last track on Side One (MGM SE-4496). For the recording, conductor/arranger Bob Florence created a radically different jazz/showtune arrangement for the song, because that was the style of music Lainie specialized in. Also, the song's title was modified slightly: instead of "I Saw An Angel Die", it was shortened slightly to "An Angel Died". The album was released in 1968.
