= Enemy Territory (film) =

1987 film

- Directed by: Peter Manoogian
- Written by: Stuart M. Kaminsky; Bobby Liddell
- Produced by: Cynthia DePaula; Tim Kincaid
- Starring: Gary Frank; Ray Parker Jr. Jan-Michael Vincent
- Cinematography: Ernest R. Dickerson
- Edited by: Peter Teschner
- Music by: Sam Winans; Richard "Koz" Kosinski
- Distributed by: Empire Pictures
- Release date: May 22, 1987
- Running time: 89 minutes
- Country: United States
- Language: English

Enemy Territory is a 1987 American action film directed by Peter Manoogian from a screenplay by Stuart M. Kaminsky and Bobby Liddell. The film stars Gary Frank, Ray Parker Jr., and Jan-Michael Vincent. The film is about an insurance salesman who inadvertently gets trapped in a New York City public housing apartment building that is controlled and terrorized by a local street gang. The film was released by Empire Pictures on May 22, 1987.

The film was produced by Cynthia DePaula and Tim Kincaid.

== Plot ==
Barry (Frank) is a formerly successful insurance executive whose career and life are being destroyed by alcoholism. As the day ends, he is sent to a notorious New York City housing project, the Lincoln Towers, to try and complete a life insurance policy sale to a nice elderly woman named Elva (Frances Foster). Meanwhile, a man named Will (Parker), a soft-spoken but tough employee of the telephone company, also heads to the building to hook up with his girlfriend and repair the phone lines. Unfortunately for Barry, while inquiring where Elva's apartment is, he taps a boy, Decon (Theo Caesar) on the shoulder and quickly becomes the hated target of a savage, fanatical gang called the Vampires, who run the Towers. They're led by their ruthless but charismatic leader the Count (Tony Todd), who runs his gang like a cult and is seen to be indestructible by himself and his followers. An attempt to kill Barry leads to the deaths of the building's security guard and Decon. With Barry's entrapment inside the building, he crosses paths with Will and makes his first reluctant ally willing to help him. They take safety in Elva's apartment but escape when the Vampires trap them. Leaving Elva behind, they find Elva's determined granddaughter Toni (Stacey Dash), visiting with her neighbors. Toni suggests they go to the apartment of Mr. Parker (Vincent), a bigoted, crippled and unstable but yet still vicious Vietnam vet the gang fears (along the way Barry is forced to kill one of the gang members leaving him with mild PTSD). Paid for his help, Parker lets the trio in (revealing he's modified a wheelchair with an arsenal of concealed weapons). Then Toni leaves to check on her grandmother, but when she arrives, she discovers Elva had been beaten and forced to reveal where Barry and Will are.

The Vampires, holding Elva and Toni hostage, arrive at Parker's apartment with Barry surrendering himself to save them. As Barry and Will exit, Parker and the Vampires engage in a shootout. In the midst of the gunfire, Barry, Will, and Toni escape. When Elva and Parker retreat back inside his apartment, Parker is shot in the chest and a short time later dies as Elva struggles to save him. Next, the trio head to the apartment of Chet Cole (Deon Richmond), a little boy, living with his mother, whom they heard is the only one who knows a way out of the building that no one else knows, not even the Vampires. According to Chet, the way out is in the building's basement, with Chet offering to show them, but his mother sends him to bed, leading him to sneak out.

After saving them from being killed by Psycho (Robert Lee Rush), the Count's crazed relative (by knocking said gang member down an elevator shaft with a baseball bat), Chet joins the trio as they descend to the basement through the said elevator shaft. In the basement, Chet shows them the way out, but the opening is too small for either Barry or Will to fit through. Toni, however, is able to fit through (but as she is leaving, gets grabbed by a badly injured Psycho who Barry forcibly finishes off with Chet's baseball bat) and runs to get the police. But when she arrives at the station, the officers refuse to help, due to two cops being shot on a previous visit to the building.

While Barry and Will wait, Will comes up with another plan. Using the money that Elva gave Barry earlier in the film, they send Chet back upstairs. With sunrise approaching, Chet litters the money out a window to the Vampires guarding the basement door to the outside. At the same time, the Count and other Vampires realize that after checking every apartment in the building the basement is the only place left to look (on entering said basement the Count is stunned to see Psycho is dead). When the money distraction works, Barry and Will escape just as the Count and his remaining Vampires arrive, and Barry is shot in the ankle.

Outside, Will and a wounded Barry start running as they are being chased and tormented by the last of the gang (with the Count ordering his followers to let him avenge Decon and Psycho). Cornered, Will uses the one and only shot he has left in his gun to protect Barry and himself, he does this by having a final showdown with the Count. As the Count closes in, Will shoots and struggles with him, until he knocks him briefly to the ground. The Vampires are momentarily demoralized when they see the Count is not invulnerable, despite his claims he still is, with Barry using this distraction to slam a swing seat into his head until the Count collapses and dies while the other Vampires, now enraged at their leader's death prepare to gun down Barry and Will. But Elva, using Parker's machine gun, fires shots at them from the apartment window to hold them at bay. Seconds later, Toni and the police finally arrive, with the remaining gang members fleeing. Having survived a deadly night against a vicious gang, the film ends with Will and Toni accompanying Barry as he is taken to an ambulance.

== Cast ==
- Gary Frank as Barry Rapchick
- Ray Parker Jr. as Will Jackson
- Jan-Michael Vincent as Parker
- Frances Foster as Elva Briggs
- Tony Todd as "The Count"
- Stacey Dash as Antoinette "Toni" Briggs
- Deon Richmond as Chet
- Kadeem Hardison as "A-Train"

== Production ==
According to Manoogian, the working title of the film was Show No Mercy.

== Release ==
The film was given a limited theatrical release on May 22, 1987. Later that year, CBS/Fox released the film on videocassette and laserdisc. To this day, the film has never been released on a region 1 DVD and as of March 4, 2018, MGM had no current plans to release the film onto DVD. Arrow Video released the film on Blu-ray on August 4, 2025 in the United Kingdom.
