= The Gift (1979 film) =

- Genre: Drama
- Based on: The Gift by Pete Hamill
- Written by: Robert Malloy
- Directed by: Don Taylor
- Starring: Gary Frank; Glenn Ford; Julie Harris
- Theme music composer: George Aliceson Tipton
- Country of origin: United States
- Original language: English

Production
- Executive producer: Gerald W. Abrams
- Producer: Joel Rogosin
- Cinematography: Robert E. Collins
- Editors: John Farrell; Gregory Prange
- Running time: 96m
- Production company: Paramount Television

Original release
- Network: CBS
- Release: December 15, 1979

The Gift is a 1979 made-for-television film directed by Don Taylor and starring Glenn Ford, Gary Frank and Julie Harris. It was broadcast on the CBS network.

== Plot ==
Pete Devlin (Gary Frank), a 17-year-old sailor, returns home to Brooklyn on leave from the Navy for Christmas in the 1950s.

Pete's father (Glenn Ford) is an emotionally-distant and heavy-drinking factory worker who lost a leg in an accident. As a Christmas gift, the local VFW post makes Billy an honorary member. The Commander (M. Emmet Walsh) presents a slide show of Billy when he was a young soccer star before the war. Billy interrupts the slide show and tells them to stop.

Pete visits his girlfriend, 17-year-old Kathleen (Allison Argo). He wants to marry her, become an artist, and move to Paris. He learns that Kathleen has a new boyfriend who doesn't talk about "dumb things" like moving to Paris.

Pete visits Patsy (Anthony Ponzini) asking to buy a gun to kill the guy who "moved in on" Kathleen. Patsy refuses to sell a gun to the drunken Pete.

Younger brother Teddy (Kevin Bacon) buys a gun and plans to rob a gas station. Pete takes the gun from Teddy.

Kathleen shows up at a party with her new boyfriend, Eddie Riggs (Jerry Machen). Pete has the gun with him and considers using it, but he throws it out the window. He sucker-punches Eddie and knocks him out. A gun is found on Eddie. Pete says "so long" to Kathleen and walks out of the party.

Pete visits his father at the bar. Pete asks why his father never talks about the accident. "Why didn't you ever let me know you? The worst thing happened in your life and you never said a word about it to me. ... It's like I'm some stranger. I know how hard it is to talk about that. It's hard for you to talk about anything." He yells, "I want you talk to me, damn it."

The father explains he never wanted anyone to feel sorry for him. He explains that, when he was young, he loved soccer more than summer, more than singing, more than whisky. He felt like he was magic when he moved down the soccer field. He tells about his time in the hospital with gangrene and waking up in the operating room as the doctors were cutting off his leg. He cries and tells Pete: "I still hear the sound of the saw. That leg, it was magic, a gift from god. Then one day they cut it off. They just took it away."

A young man at the bar calls the father a "gimp". Pete and his father knock them down and throw them out of the bar. The father re-introduces his son to the bar: "This is my son Peter in whom I'm well proud." They drink together and sing Irish songs as they stumble up the stairs to the apartment.

The film ends with Peter leaving to return to the Navy. An older Pete narrates: "My Christmas leave was over. And leaving that morning I felt oddly free. I was going out into the world, on my own at last. And I remember that Christmas I hadn't received much in any ordinary way, but my father loved me back, and there was no other gift I wanted."

== Cast ==
- Gary Frank as Pete Devlin
- Glenn Ford as Billy Devlin, Pete's Father
- Julie Harris as Anne Devlin, Pete's Mother
- Kevin Bacon as Teddy Devlin, Pete's Younger Brother
- Allison Argo as Kathleen
- M. Emmet Walsh as The Commander
- Jerry Machen as Eddie Riggs
