= VanLandingham Estate =

Historic house in North Carolina, United States

- U.S. National Register of Historic Places
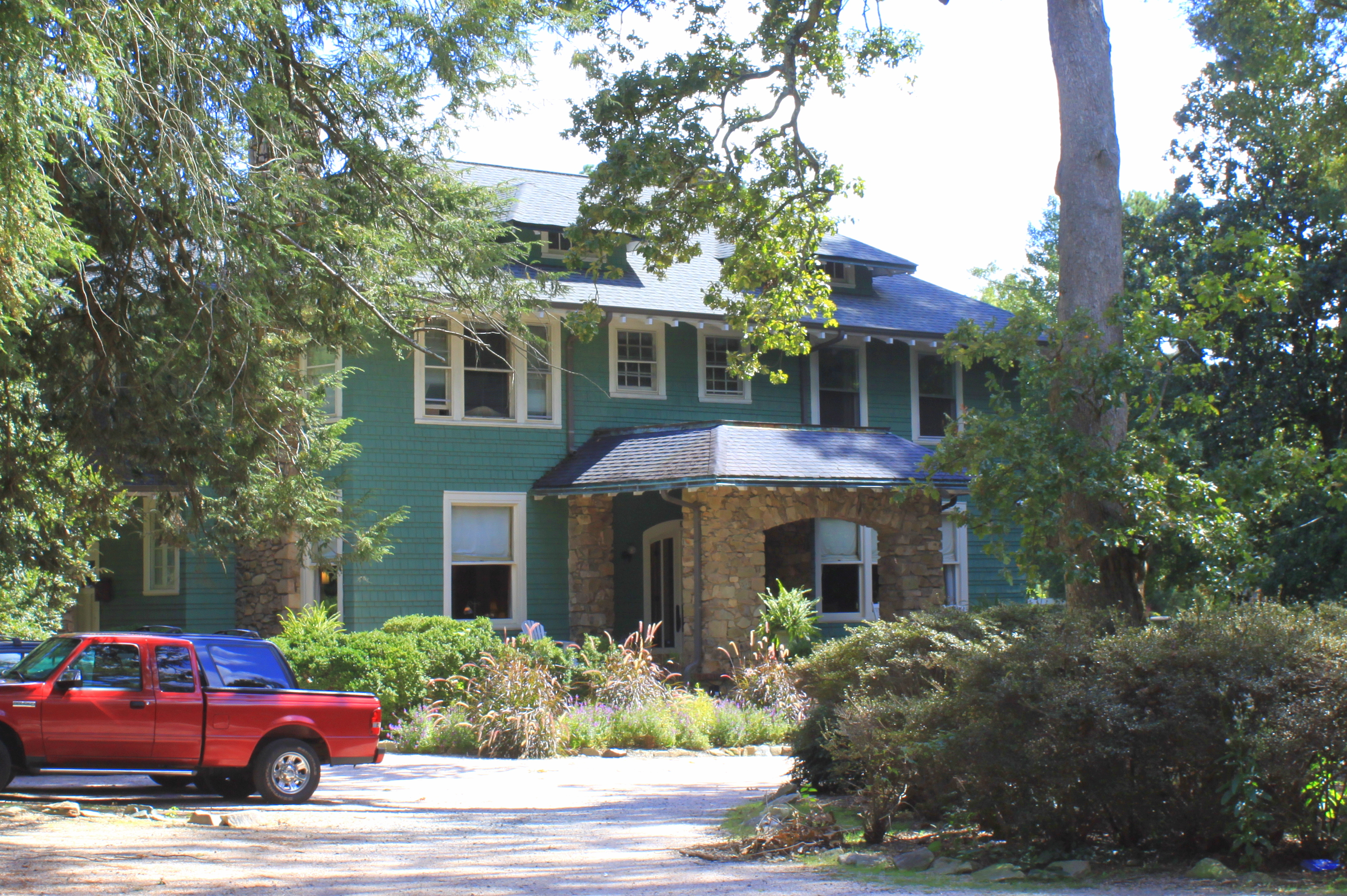

- Location within North Carolina Location within the United States
- Location: 2010 The Plaza, Charlotte, North Carolina
- Coordinates: 35°13′47″N 80°48′30″W
- Area: 4.2 acres (1.7 ha)
- Built: 1913-1914
- Architect: Hood and Rogers Leigh Colyer
- Architectural style: Bungalow/craftsman
- NRHP reference No.: 83003971
- Added to NRHP: October 13, 1983

VanLandingham Estate is a historic home located at Charlotte, Mecklenburg County, North Carolina. It was built in 1913–1914, and is a large two-story, wood-shingled, Bungalow / American Craftsman style dwelling. The entrance features a low roofed canopy supported on stone piers and it has a hipped terra cotta tile roof. The house is set in carefully landscaped grounds originally designed by Leigh Colyer, one of the region's earliest landscape architects.

It was listed on the National Register of Historic Places in 1983. Currently, the building is being used as a bed and breakfast.
