= Poisoned Dreams =

True crime book about the murder of Nancy Lyon

Poisoned Dreams: A True Story of Murder, Money and Family Secrets
- Author: A. W. Gray
- Genre: Non-fiction
- Publisher: Dutton
- Publication date: 1993

Poisoned Dreams: A True Story of Murder, Money and Family Secrets is a 1993 true crime book about the murder of Nancy Lyon, written by A. W. Gray and published by Dutton.

This was the first true crime book written by Gray, who previously wrote mystery novels.

Lyon died of poisoning. Her ex-husband, Richard Lyon, was convicted of killing her and sentenced to life in prison. Gray believes that Lyon was wrongfully convicted.

== Reception ==
Kirkus Reviews stated that the book had "needless suspense and melodrama".

Publishers Weekly stated that "his venture into writing nonfiction is less than successful" even though he did good research. The review stated that the author "resorts to speculation and outright (if admitted) invention" and that "the evidence in the case, confounding and contradictory, is hardly clarified by Gray's often melodramatic treatment."
