= Glynnis O'Connor =

American actress (b. 1955)

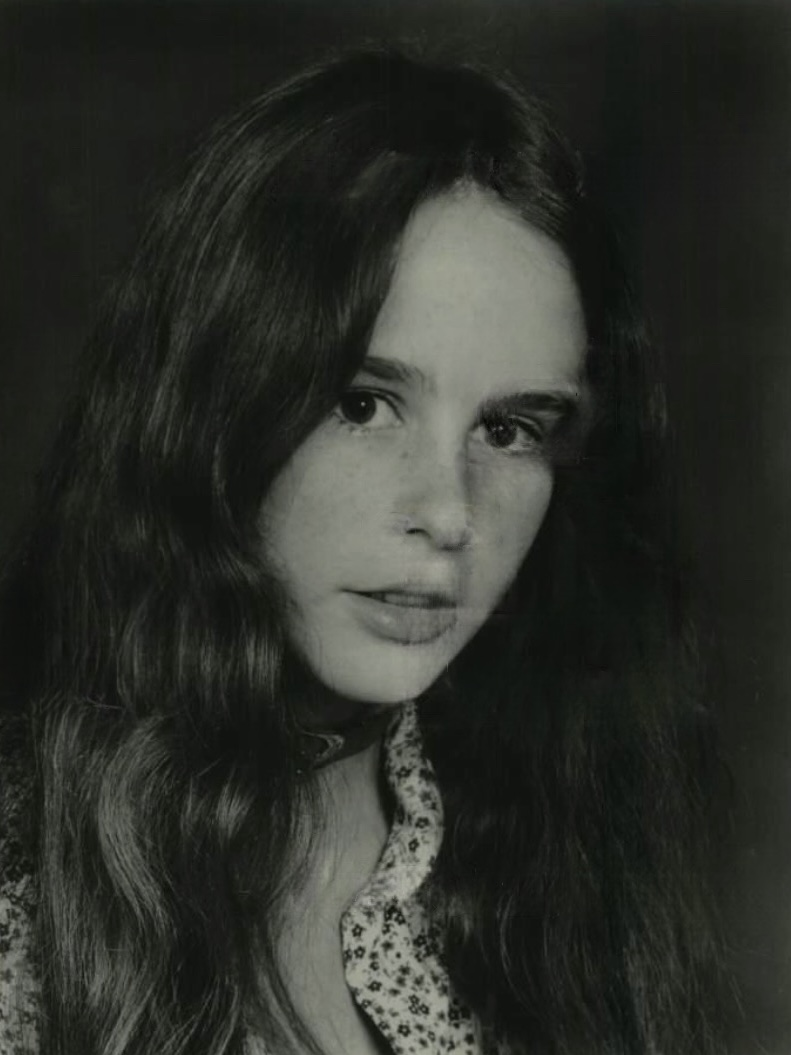
- O'Connor in Sons and Daughters (1974)
- Born: November 19, 1955 (age 70); New Rochelle, New York, U.S.
- Years active: 1973–present
- Spouse: Douglas Stern (m. 1985)
- Children: 2

Glynnis O'Connor (born November 19, 1955) is an American actress. She made her big-screen debut starring in the 1973 romantic drama film, Jeremy. She later starred in the short-lived CBS drama series Sons and Daughters (1974) and the television version of Our Town (1977). She starred in films Ode to Billy Joe, Baby Blue Marine (both 1976), California Dreaming (1979), Those Lips, Those Eyes (1980), The White Lions (1981), Night Crossing, Melanie (both 1982) and Johnny Dangerously (1984).

== Personal life ==
O'Connor was born in New Rochelle, New York, and is the daughter of actress Lenka Peterson and film producer Daniel Patrick O'Connor. She is married to Douglas Stern, a New York City native, and they have two daughters together, Lindsay (b. 1990) and Hana.

== Career ==
In 1973, O'Connor made her screen debut and also sang the title song for the romantic drama film Jeremy in which she co-starred with Robby Benson. Soon after her big-screen debut, O'Connor was cast as a female lead opposite Gary Frank in the CBS drama series, Sons and Daughters. On January 8, 1974, she starred in the CBS Radio Mystery Theatre production of "Ring of Roses" and then co-starred with John Travolta in the 1976 TV movie The Boy in the Plastic Bubble. The same year, she portrayed Bobbie Lee Hartley, co-starring again with Robby Benson, in the drama film Ode to Billy Joe, a tragic romance produced and directed by Max Baer Jr., and the drama film Baby Blue Marine opposite Jan-Michael Vincent The following year she starred in the Western film Kid Vengeance and the made-for-television version of Our Town. In 1978, she starred in the made-for-television biographical film, Little Mo playing Maureen Connolly, the 1950s American tennis player who was the first woman to win all four Grand Slam tournaments during the same calendar year, before an accident ended her tennis career at age 19. In 1979, she returned to big screen starring in the comedy-drama film, California Dreaming.

In 1980, O'Connor starred opposite Tom Hulce in the romantic comedy film, Those Lips, Those Eyes, receiving positive note from critic Roger Ebert. The following year she starred opposite Michael York in the drama film, The White Lions. In 1982 she had a supporting role in the thriller film Night Crossing and the leading role in the drama film, Melanie. Ned Powers of the Saskatoon Star-Phoenix wrote that "a compelling performance by O'Connor and a surprisingly fluid effort by Cummings lift the picture beyond the fair-to-middling category", adding that "the music, most written and performed by Cummings, is a strong selling point". Bruce Bailey of The Montreal Gazette echoed Powers' praise of Glynnis O'Connor, but otherwise found the film to be a calculating melodrama. Calling it "a successful manipulator of emotions", he noted that the crowd erupted into cheers when Melanie finally hit back at her cruel husband, noting that "the morality of encouraging such applause for violence on anybody's part, however, is a little dicey." At the 4th Genie Awards, she won the Genie Award for Best Performance by a Foreign Actress for her performance in Melanie. In 1984, she was featured in the crime comedy film, Johnny Dangerously making her final big screen appearance in 1980s.

Since the mid-1980s, O'Connor has been in a string of made-for-television movies. In 1984, she starred as Leola Mae Harmon in the biographical film Why Me?, about United States Air Force nurse Harmon's trauma and series of facial reconstruction surgeries after a horrifying car accident. In 1986, O'Connor performed in the miniseries The Deliberate Stranger. Her other notable film credits include Love Leads the Way: A True Story (1984), To Heal a Nation (1988), Police Story: Cop Killer (1988) and Kojak: Flowers for Matty (1990). She starred in a 1986 episode of The Twilight Zone and from 1992 to 1993 had a recurring role in the NBC police drama Reasonable Doubts as Mark Harmon's character ex-wife. From 1993 to 1994, she replaced Ellen Dolan in the role of Margo Hughes on the CBS daytime soap opera, As the World Turns. In 1995, she made her return to primetime TV starring opposite Richard Thomas in the true crime television film, Death in Small Doses. She later starred in Summer of Fear (1996), Ellen Foster (1997), and Saint Maybe (1998).

O’Connor played defense attorney Anne Paulsen in five episodes, from 1998 through 2004, on the NBC drama series, Law & Order. She also guest-starred on Law & Order: Special Victims Unit and Law & Order: Criminal Intent. In 2002, she made her first big-screen appearance since 1980s, in the mystery thriller film, New Best Friend. In 2007, she appeared in the independent feature film P.J., directed by Russ Emanuel. She later appeared in films Angelica (2015), Diane, and A Bread Factory (2018). In 2020, she had a recurring role in the Epix thriller series, Condor and later was cast as Shirley Beaumont in the Starz crime drama series, Power Book III: Raising Kanan.

== Filmography ==
=== Film ===
Year	Title	Role	Notes
1973	Jeremy	Susan Rollins	
1976	Baby Blue Marine	Rose	
1976	Ode to Billy Joe	Bobbie Lee Hartley	
1977	Kid Vengeance	Lisa Thurston	
1978	Getting It Over With	Ruthie	short
1979	California Dreaming	Corky	
1980	Those Lips, Those Eyes	Ramona	
1981	The White Lions	Jeannie McBride	
1982	Night Crossing	Petra Wetzel	
1982	Melanie	Melanie	Genie Award for Best Performance by a Foreign Actress
1984	Johnny Dangerously	Sally	
2002	New Best Friend	Connie Campbell	
2007	Graduation	Mary	
2008	P.J.	Evelyn	
2012	The Trouble with Cali	Avie Bluejones	
2012	Album	Adult Trish	short
2014	The Historian	Dean Jan Messer	
2015	Angelica	Older Constance	
2018	Diane	Dottie	
2018	A Bread Factory	Jan	

=== Television ===
Year	Title	Role	Notes
1973	As the World Turns	Dawn "Dee" Stewart	TV series
1974	Love Is Not Forever	Anita	TV film
1974	Insight	Laura	"Resuscitation"
1974	Sons and Daughters	Anita Cramer	main role
1975	All Together Now	Carol Lindsay	ABC Movie of the Week
1975	Someone I Touched	Carrie	ABC Movie of the Week
1975	The Rookies	Ellen	"Cliffy"
1976	Harry O	Gayle	"Mister Five and Dime"
1976	The Boy in the Plastic Bubble	Gina Biggs	TV film
1977	Insight	Laura	"She's Waiting for Us"
1977	Our Town	Emily Webb	TV film
1977	Rosetti and Ryan	Angel	"Bedeviled Angel"
1978	Black Beauty	Phyllis Carpenter	TV miniseries
1978	Little Mo	Maureen Connolly	TV film
1979	The Chisholms	Elizabeth Chisholm	TV miniseries
1980	My Kidnapper, My Love	Geegee	TV film
1983	The Fighter	Rindy Banks	TV film
1984	Why Me?	Leola Mae Harmon	TV film
1984	Love Leads the Way: A True Story	Lois	TV film
1985	Sins of the Father	Kevan Harris	TV film
1986	The Deliberate Stranger	Cas Richter	TV film
1986	The Twilight Zone	Dorothy Livingston	"The Storyteller"
1987	A Conspiracy of Love	Marcia Woldarski	TV film
1988	To Heal a Nation	Becky Scruggs	TV film
1988	Too Good to Be True	Ruth Berent	TV film
1988	Police Story: Cop Killer	Lynn Lewis	TV film
1990	Kojak: Flowers for Matty	Molly Fitzimons	TV film
1992	Nightmare in Daylight	Sloan Evans	TV film
1992–1993	Reasonable Doubts	Jo	recurring role
1993–1994	As the World Turns	Margo Hughes	TV series
1995	Death in Small Doses	Nancy Lyon	TV film
1995	Past the Bleachers	Harper Parish	TV film
1996	Summer of Fear	'Cat' Marshall	TV film
1997	Ellen Foster	Charlotte Nelson Hammond	TV film
1998	Saint Maybe	Claudia Bedloe	TV film
1998–2004	Law & Order	Anne Paulsen	recurring role
2000	Young Americans	Donna Banks	"Will Bella Scout Her Mom?"
2003	Law & Order: Special Victims Unit	Raquel Kurtz	"Damaged"
2006	Law & Order: Criminal Intent	Rev. Poole	"On Fire"
2012	Behind the 8 Ball	Guest	"Matty"
2021	Sand Dollar Cove	Nana	Hallmark movie
2023–2024	Power Book III: Raising Kanan	Shirley Beaumont	TV Series
