= Mississippi Delta (song) =

Single by Bobbie Gentry

from the album Ode to Billie Joe
- B-side: "Ode to Billie Joe"
- Released: October 5, 1967
- Recorded: 1967
- Studio: Whitney Recording Studio (Glendale)
- Genre: Southern rock
- Length: 3:05
- Label: Capitol
- Songwriter(s): Bobbie Gentry
- Producer(s): Kelly Gordon; Bobby Paris

Bobbie Gentry singles chronology
"I Saw an Angel Die" (1967)	"Mississippi Delta" (1967)	"Okolona River Bottom Band" (1967)

"Mississippi Delta" is a song written and recorded by American singer-songwriter Bobbie Gentry. The song was produced by Kelly Gordon and Bobby Parris. It was originally released as the B-side of Gentry's debut single "Ode to Billie Joe" on July 10, 1967. It was released as Gentry's debut single in Japan on October 5, 1967, with "Ode to Billie Joe" as the B-side. "Ode to Billie Joe" would be issued as single in Japan in May 1968 with "Niki Hoeky" as the B-side.

== Background ==
Gentry's sole ambition originally was to write songs to sell to other artists, telling the Washington Post that she only sang on the recording of "Ode to Billie Joe" that she took to Capitol because it was cheaper than hiring someone to sing it. Gentry also brought "Mississippi Delta" to Capitol on the same demo tape and it was this recording, rather than "Ode to Billie Joe", that initially got her signed. In retrospect, the track is more obviously commercial and reflects what was on the charts in 1967. Gentry most likely recorded the song at Whitney Recording Studio in Glendale, California. She recorded a 12-song demo that would become the basis of her debut album.

Gentry was officially signed to Capitol Records on June 23, 1967. The "demo" tracks became the album masters; the purchased recording of "Mississippi Delta" was the version issued, but "Ode to Billie Joe" had a string arrangement by Jimmie Haskell dubbed onto the original recording at Capitol. It was the day after the string session that Capitol's A&R team decided definitively that "Ode to Billie Joe" would be the A-side.

== Critical reception ==
Richie Unterberger of AllMusic praised the track, calling it a "gloriously tough, throaty swamp rock; few other women pop singers have sounded as raw."

== Commercial performance ==
"Mississippi Delta" was released as Gentry's debut single in Japan in October 1967 and did not chart.

== Track listing ==
- Capitol CR-1789
1. "Mississippi Delta" (Bobbie Gentry) – 3:00
2. "Ode to Billie Joe" (Gentry) – 4:15

== Personnel ==
Adapted from the single liner notes.

- Bobbie Gentry - vocals
- Kelly Gordon – producer
- Bobby Paris – producer
