= Nixon Smiley =

American journalist

Nixon Smiley (August 17, 1911 – 1990) was an American reporter, columnist, and feature writer for the Miami Herald who wrote various books.

Smiley was born in Orange Park, Florida, and was raised by his maternal grandparents after losing both parents by the age of 7. He grew up hearing tales of the St. Johns River.

His career in newspapers began at The Florida Times-Union in Jacksonville. He was in the U.S. Marine Corps during World War II. Upon his return he began a 30-plus-year career at the Herald and authorship of 15 books.

He worked at the Herald from 1940 until 1973. The Nixon Smiley Research Papers (1940s-1972) are held at the Historical Museum of Southern Florida.

His wife Evelyn was an artist, and Smiley was a devoted gardener who volunteered at the Fairchild Tropical Botanic Garden, where a Nixon Smiley collection recording his records as Interim Director from 1953 to 1961 (4,000 pages) is kept as well as papers covering his field trips. Starting in 1958 and through much of the 1960s, Smiley was a member of the board of directors of the International Palm Society. There is a Nixon Smiley Pineland Preserve in Miami-Dade County.

== Writings ==
- Knights of the Fourth Estate: The Story of the Miami Herald June 1984
- Crowder Tales June 1973
- The Miami Herald Front Pages, 1903–1983 by Nixon Smiley (Hardcover - Jan 1, 1983)
- On the Beat and Offbeat June 1983
- Florida, Land of Images April 1977
- Yesterday's Miami June 1977
- Lady by Onie (as told to Nixon Smiley) Craig 1976
- Yesterday's Florida (Seemann's historic States series) June 1974
- Isabel as told to Nixon Smiley by Isabel J. Foster 1975
- Tropical Planting and Gardening for South Florida and the West Indies June 1960
- Florida Gardening month by month 1957, 1971
- Florida Gardening 1958
- Subtropical gardening in Florida 1951

The is a 120-acre Nixon Smiley Pineland Preserve.
