= Little Mo (film) =

- Genre: Biography; Drama; Sport
- Written by: John McGreevey
- Directed by: Daniel Haller
- Starring: Michael Learned; Anne Baxter; Anne Francis; Glynnis O'Connor; Mark Harmon; Leslie Nielsen
- Music by: Carl Brandt; Billy May
- Country of origin: United States
- Original language: English

Production
- Executive producer: Jack Webb
- Producer: George Sherman
- Cinematography: Harry L. Wolf
- Editors: Michael Berman; Bill E. Garst; Douglas Hines; Bob Swanson
- Running time: 150 minutes
- Production companies: Mark VII Limited; Worldvision Enterprises

Original release
- Network: NBC
- Release: September 5, 1978

Little Mo is a 1978 American made-for-television biographical film telling the life story of Maureen Connolly (September 17, 1934 – June 21, 1969), the 1950s American tennis player who was the first woman to win all four Grand Slam tournaments during the same calendar year, before an accident ended her tennis career at age 19. It stars Glynnis O'Connor, Michael Learned, Anne Baxter, Mark Harmon (as her husband Norman Brinker) and Leslie Nielsen.

== Cast ==
=== Main cast ===
- Michael Learned as Eleanor 'Teach' Tennant
- Anne Baxter as Jessamyn Connolly
- Glynnis O'Connor as Maureen Connolly
- Claude Akins as Gus Berste
- Anne Francis as Sophie Fisher
- Mark Harmon as Norman Brinker
- Martin Milner as Wilbur Folsom
- Leslie Nielsen as Nelson Fisher
- Tony Trabert as Himself
- Ann Doran as Aunt Gert
- Fred Holliday as Dr. Bruce Kimball
- Len Wayland as Johnson
- Justin Lord as Maxwell
- Maggie Wellman as Susan
- Jean Kar as Nancy Chaffee
- Cindy Brinker as Susan Partridge
- K.C. Kiner as Laura Lou Jahn
- Tory Fretz as Doris Hart
- Stacy Keach Sr. as Chamber of Commerce President
- Beatrice Manley as Duchess of Kent
- Jason Kincaid as Ben
- Tracey Gold as Cindy Brinker
- Missy Gold as Brenda Brinker
- Howard Culver as Tennis Match Announcer

=== Supporting cast ===
- Ian Abercrombie as Dr. Noyes (uncredited)

== Historical inaccuracies ==
It is strongly implied that Connolly's dramatic Wimbledon match versus Britain's Sue Partridge was the first singles match that Connolly played that year at the 1952 Wimbledon tournament. It was actually a fourth-round match.

The final scene, in which Connolly and her former coach (Eleanor Tennant) are dramatically reunited at a public tennis court near the end of Connolly's life, never occurred.
