= The Book of Lights =

1981 novel by Chaim Potok

- First edition cover
- Author: Chaim Potok
- Cover artist: Paul Bacon
- Language: English
- Publisher: Alfred A. Knopf
- Publication date: 1981
- Publication place: United States
- Media type: Print (hardback & paperback)
- Pages: 400
- ISBN: 978-0-4492-4569-9
- Preceded by: Wanderings: Chaim Potok's History of the Jews
- Followed by: Davita's Harp

The Book of Lights is a 1981 novel by Chaim Potok about a young rabbi and student of Kabbalah whose service as a United States military chaplain in Korea and Japan after the Korean War challenges his thinking about the meaning of faith in a world of "light" from many sources.

== Synopsis ==
The novel's central character is Gershon Loran, a young rabbi who is "the product of a parochial New York Jewish upbringing," who is "irresistibly drawn to the study of the Jewish mysticism known as Kabbalah."

Raised by an aunt and uncle after his parents are killed in 1937, in terrorist cross-fire in Palestine, Gershon is taught that Judaism has made "a fundamental difference in the world." He later serves as a U.S. military chaplain at the end of the Korean War in Korea and in Japan, countries "where Judaism has played no part, has had no reality, has never existed," and yet countries that seem to be touched by the light he had experienced through his studies of Kabbalah. Here he begins to see his faith, his people, and himself in a new light, in a way that casts doubt on his beliefs and his thinking.

Described as "psychological fiction" or "psychological realism," the novel takes place during the years 1950–57. It is divided into three periods: Gershon's rabbinical school days in New York City; service as a chaplain in Korea; time spent in Japan, including visits to Hiroshima and Kyoto, along with Arthur Leiden, a classmate from rabbinical school.

== Background ==
The Book of Lights, like many of Potok's novels, explores "the tension between tradition and modernity, and the clash between Jewish culture and contemporary Western civilization, which he calls 'core-to-core culture confrontation.'

Potok writes that the inspiration for this novel came from his own service as an Army Chaplain in Korea and Japan. Potok writes:

What about a confrontation where the end result is no answers at all, but only questions? That's what The Book of Lights is all about. Admittedly a rather difficult book, deliberately so because of the difficult problems it deals with. I spent fifteen and a half months of my life in Korea and a little bit of that in Japan, courtesy of the United States military in which I became a chaplain. I came into that experience with a very neat coherent picture of what I was as an American and what I was as a Jew. All that neat, antique coherence came undone in the fifteen and a half months that I spent in that part of the world. I remember when I was very, very young, being taught by my father and my teachers that paganism was intrinsically an abomination. I came to Japan and to Korea and saw pagan loveliness I never dreamed I could see. The sheer beauty of that pagan world overwhelmed me. Although it was manmade loveliness, its beauty was created by the human hand for the purposes of worship. I learned to appreciate the loveliness of God's world in a pagan land.

Potok's experiences as a military chaplain in Asia after the war inform some of his descriptions of war and its aftermath in this novel—including the dropping of the atomic bombs and the suffering of its victims—but would later form the basis of his 1992 work, I Am the Clay, where the idea of the cruelty and futility of war takes center stage.

== Title ==
The novel's title is a translation of a classic kabbalistic text, "Sefer HaZohar," commonly referred to simply as the "Zohar." However, "light" in the novel takes on a number of meanings other than the light of mysticism or faith: even the light of the atomic bomb that the father of Gershon's friend Arthur helped to create. As one scholarly reviewer puts it, "Pervasive light imagery provides a thematic structure for the novel."

== Publication ==
The novel was first published October 16, 1981, by Alfred A. Knopf, Inc. It was released as a paperback by Fawcett Crest in November 1982.

== Reception ==
The novel was widely discussed within religious circles as one that asked profoundly important questions about God and about ourselves in a world where we begin to encounter, sometimes for the first time, those of other faiths. In Diana Eck's God: A spiritual journey from Bozeman to Banaras, she describes the scene in the novel where Gershon and Leiden watch a religious Buddhist in a shrine in Japan, prompting Gershon to ask his friend whether he thinks that God is listening to this man's prayers. "If he is", Gershon asks, "then what are we [Jews] all about?" As Eck puts it,

If we conclude that "our God" is not listening, then we had better ask how we are to speak of God at all as people of faith in a world of many faiths. But if we suspect that our God is listening, then how are we to speak of ourselves as people of faith among other peoples of faith? Is our God listening? It is a disarmingly simple question... But this simple question leads us into the most profound theological, social, and political issues of our time.

== Adaptation ==
In response to a request from Carol Rocamora, Producer/Director of the Philadelphia Festival of New Plays, Potok wrote stage adaptations of a number of his works, including The Play of Lights, a two-act play based on this novel.

The play was produced by the Festival at the Harold Prince Theater, Annandale Center, in May 1992, receiving mixed reviews. It was directed by Rocamora, and starred Benjamin White as Gershon, and Matt Servito as Arthur. Reviewer Clifford A. Ridley described the script as a transformation of the book into a play "of satisfying dramatic shape," but noted that the pacing of the play, "with its frequent and seemingly interminable pauses, is simply too much of... well, of nothing at all."

The play was also performed in 1993 in Florida, at the Hollywood Performing Arts Theater. It received a very favorable review in the South Florida Sun Sentinel, where it was described as "a drama of aura and far-reaching ambition... disturbing theater... [that] raises more questions than it answers, perhaps Potok's purpose; but it provides an evening of thoughtful play-going."
