= Jeremy Kagan =

American film director (born 1945)

- Born: December 14, 1945 (age 80); Mount Vernon, New York, U.S.
- Education: Harvard University (BA); New York University (MFA); American Film Institute (GrDip)
- Partner: Anneke Campbell

Jeremy Paul Kagan (born December 14, 1945) is an American film and television director, screenwriter, and television producer.

== Early life ==
Kagan, the son of a rabbi, was born into a Jewish family in Mount Vernon, New York. He received his B.A. from Harvard University in 1967. He went on to attend the newly formed New York University Graduate Institute of Film & Television and was in the first class at the AFI Conservatory.

== Film and television career ==
Kagan's feature film credits include the box-office hit Heroes (1977); The Big Fix (1978), a political comedy-thriller starring Richard Dreyfuss; The Chosen (1981), from the book of the same name by Chaim Potok; The Journey of Natty Gann (1985), the first American movie ever to win the Gold Prize at the Moscow International Film Festival; the underground comedy Big Man on Campus (1989); the cult classic fencing film By The Sword (1991); and the hybrid film Golda's Balcony (2006), from the hit play of the same name. His 2017 feature Shot focuses on the consequences of gun violence and depicts how the lives of multiple individuals are affected by a single shooting incident.

He has also been a prolific television director, starting already in 1972 at the age of 26, directing "The Most Crucial Game", an episode in the second Columbo season. In 1996, Kagan won a Primetime Emmy Award for Outstanding Directing for a Drama Series for the Chicago Hope episode "Leave of Absence". Other credits include the television movie Katherine: The Making of an American Revolutionary, which he also wrote, and Conspiracy: The Trial of the Chicago 8 for which he won the CableACE Award for Best Dramatic Special. Kagan also directed Roswell: The UFO Conspiracy, which garnered a Golden Globe Award nomination.

Other television films include The Ballad of Lucy Whipple, Courage with Sophia Loren, Scott Joplin, Descending Angel for HBO and for Showtime Color of Justice, Bobbie's Girl, and Crown Heights, about the riots in 1991 which won the Humanitas Award in 2004 for "affirming the dignity of every person." This film also received an NAACP Image Award and the Directors Guild nomination for best family film. Kagan also directed a movie episode of Steven Spielberg's Emmy-winning miniseries Taken. He has worked on several other series shows including The West Wing, The Guardian, Resurrection Blvd., Picket Fences, Boomtown and more. His recent animation films have been shown on JLTV and film festivals.

In 2026, Kagan completed Imaging Torah, a 25-minute animated film based on paintings and drawings he had created over several decades in response to the weekly Torah portions and haftarot. The work draws on traditional interpretations from the Talmud, Mishnah and Zohar.

Kagan produced and directed the ten-part series The ACLU Freedom Files in 2006 and 2007 which received a number of awards and was shown on Link TV, Court TV and PBS. Kagan has made a number of short documentaries and advocacy dramatic films for NGOs including The Doe Fund which works with the homeless and formerly incarcerated, and The Democracy School a movement developing local governance, and Bioneers which advances achievements in environmental and social justice.

== Other ventures ==
Kagan is a full tenured professor at the University of Southern California where he teaches the graduate courses in directing and has recently created the Center for Change Making Media which is a hub for research and training in advocacy cinematic genres. His production company ACTransformative Media has made numerous shorts including three for VaccinateLA.

He has served as artistic director at the Robert Redford's Sundance Institute and is on a National Board Member of the Directors Guild of America and chairperson of its Special Projects Committee which provides cultural and educational programs for the 19,000 members. In 2004 he was honored with the Robert Aldrich Award for "extraordinary service to the guild."

In his capacity with the Directors Guild of America, Kagan also moderates the group's annual roundtable discussion featuring that year's five nominees for Outstanding Directing – Feature Film.

Kagan is also the author of three books Directors Close Up and a "living" eTextbook Keys to Directing.

== Personal life ==
Kagan was previously married to Elaine Goren in 1974. His daughter from that marriage, Eve Kagan, is an actress and licensed professional counselor; she holds an Ed.M. from Harvard Graduate School of Education and an M.A. from Northwestern University.

Kagan's wife, Anneke Campbell, is a Dutch-born author, editor, and filmmaker. She co-wrote the script for his film Shot and co-produced the series The ACLU Freedom Files.

== Filmography ==
Film

Year	Title	Director	Writer	Producer
1972	The Love Song of Charles Farberman	Yes	Yes	No
1977	Scott Joplin	Yes	No	No
1977	Heroes	Yes	No	No
1978	The Big Fix	Yes	No	No
1981	The Chosen	Yes	Uncredited re-writes	No
1983	The Sting II	Yes	No	No
1985	The Journey of Natty Gann	Yes	No	No
1989	Big Man on Campus	Yes	No	No
1991	By the Sword	Yes	No	No
2007	Golda's Balcony	Yes	No	No
2017	Shot	Yes	Story	Yes

Television

Year	Title	Director	Writer	Producer	Notes
1972	Nichols	Yes	No	No	Episode "All in the Family"
1972	The Bold Ones: The New Doctors	Yes	No	No	Episode "A Very Strange Triangle"
1972	Columbo	Yes	No	No	Episode "The Most Crucial Game"
1973	ABC Afterschool Special	Yes	No	No	Episode "My Dad Lives in a Downtown Hotel"
1974	Unwed Father	Yes	No	No	Television film
1974	Judge Dee and the Monastery Murders	Yes	No	No	Television film
1975	Katherine	Yes	Yes	No	Television film
1983	Faerie Tale Theatre	Yes	No	No	Episode "Sleeping Beauty"
1986	Courage	Yes	No	No	Television film
1987	Conspiracy: The Trial of the Chicago 8	Yes	Yes	Yes	Television film
1990	Descending Angel	Yes	Yes	No	Television film
1992-1995	Picket Fences	Yes	No	No	Three episodes
1993	Dr. Quinn, Medicine Woman	Yes	No	Co-producer	Episode "Pilot"
1994	Roswell	Yes	Story	Yes	Television film
1994-1995	Chicago Hope	Yes	No	No	Two episodes
1997	Color of Justice	Yes	No	No	Television film
1997	The Hired Heart	Yes	No	No	Television film
1998	Ally McBeal	Yes	No	No	Episode "Forbidden Fruits"
2000	Resurrection Blvd.	Yes	No	No	Three episodes
2000-2002	The West Wing	Yes	No	No	Two episodes
2001	The Ballad of Lucy Whipple	Yes	No	No	Television film
2001	Family Law	Yes	No	No	Episode "Liar's Club: Part 1"
2001-2003	The Guardian	Yes	No	No	Three episodes
2002	Bobbie's Girl	Yes	No	No	Television film
2002	Boomtown	Yes	No	No	Episode "Crash"
2002	Taken	Yes	No	No	Episode "God's Equation"
2003	Karen Sisco	Yes	No	No	Episode "Dumb Bunnies"
2003	The Handler	Yes	No	No	Two episodes
2004	Crown Heights	Yes	No	Yes	Television film
2005	Blind Justice	Yes	No	No	Episode "Marlon's Brando"
2005-2007	The ACLU Freedom Films	Yes	No	Yes	Documentary series

== Awards and nominations ==
Year	Award	Result	Category	Film or series
1981	Montreal World Film Festival	Won	Prize of the Ecumenical Jury - Special Mention	The Chosen
1981	Montreal World Film Festival	Won	Grand Prix des Amériques	The Chosen
1987	Paris Film Festival	Won	Special Jury Prize	The Chosen
1988	CableACE Awards	Nominated	Directing a Theatrical or Dramatic Special	Conspiracy: The Trial of the Chicago 8
1988	CableACE Awards	Won (Note: Shared with Amanda DiGiulio, Charles Hairston, Max A. Keller, Micheline H. Keller, and Ron Sossi.)	Dramatic Special	Conspiracy: The Trial of the Chicago 8
1996	Primetime Emmy Award	Won	Outstanding Directing for a Drama Series	Chicago Hope (For the episode "Leave of Absence")
2004	Directors Guild of America Award	Won	Robert B. Aldrich Achievement Award	-
2005	Directors Guild of America Award	Nominated	Outstanding Directorial Achievement in Children's Programs	Crown Heights
