= Robby Benson =

American actor and director (born 1956)

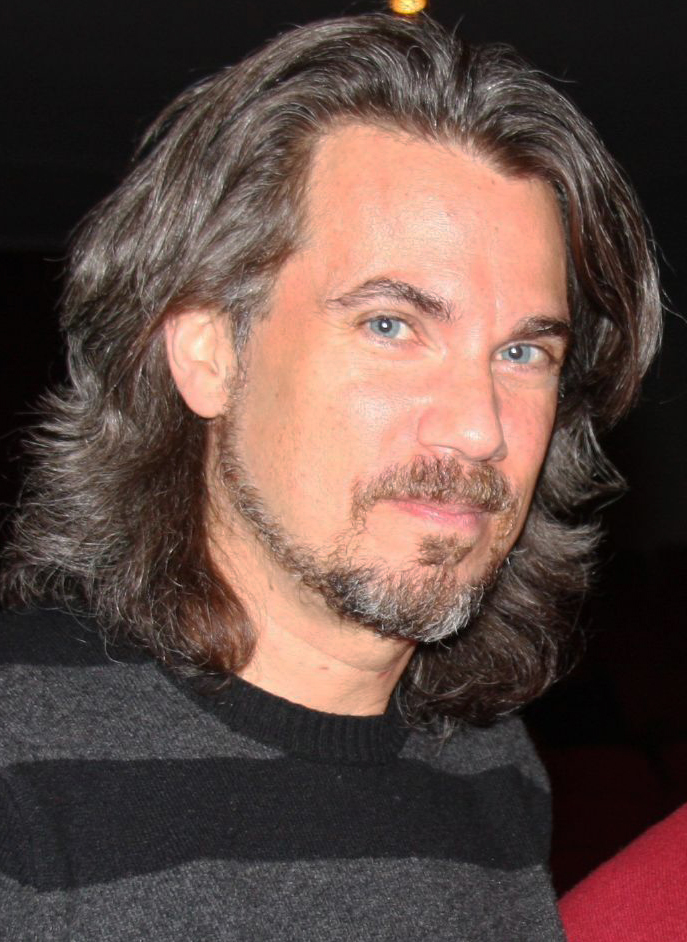
- Benson in 2007
- Born: Robin David Segal; January 21, 1956 (age 70); Dallas, Texas, U.S.
- Occupations: Actor; television director; singer; composer; teacher
- Years active: 1965–present
- Spouse: Karla DeVito (m. 1982)
- Children: 2

Robby Benson (born Robin David Segal; January 21, 1956) is an American actor, director, and musician. He rose to prominence as a teen idol in the late 1970s, appearing in the films Ode to Billy Joe (1976), One on One (1977) and Ice Castles (1978). He subsequently voiced the Beast in the Disney animated film Beauty and the Beast (1991) and its numerous sequels, spin-offs and most Disney media. Benson has directed in television, including six episodes of the sitcom Friends. He recently appeared in a recurring role as Dr. Mauer in Apple TV+'s Severance.

In addition to acting and directing, Benson is an activist in the field of heart research, having undergone four open-heart surgeries since age 28 to correct congenital aortic valve defects and related damage. In 2012, he published a memoir recounting his medical journey and numerous surgeries.

== Early life and education ==
Benson was born in Dallas, Texas, the son of Freda Ann (née Benson), a singer, actor, and business promotions manager, and Jerry Segal, a writer. His family is Jewish. When Benson was five years old, his family relocated to New York City, where he was raised. He subsequently took his mother's name as his stage name when he was 10. Benson attended the Lincoln Square Academy in Manhattan, where he graduated at age fourteen as the class valedictorian.

== Career ==
Benson made his film debut with an uncredited role in Wait Until Dark (1967) as the Boy Tossing Ball and his Broadway debut in the play Zelda followed by the musical The Rothschilds (1970). Benson had an early role on the daytime soap Search for Tomorrow (1971–1972). As a film actor, Benson was well known for teenage roles in coming of age films, such as 1972's Jory, 1973's Jeremy, and as Billy Joe McAllister in 1976's Ode to Billy Joe. He had an appearance in a 1973 commercial for Reese's Peanut Butter Cups alongside Donny Most who would later co-star in Happy Days.

In 1975, Benson appeared in Death Be Not Proud and Lucky Lady. That year, he also screen tested for the role of Luke Skywalker in Star Wars, a role which eventually went to Mark Hamill. In 1977, Benson starred in One on One which he co-wrote with his father Jerry Segal, and the TV movie The Death of Richie. In 1978, he co-starred in The End and Ice Castles. Benson, who had never ice skated before, learned to skate in order to film the movie, which had numerous skating scenes, including ice hockey. In 1980, Benson starred in Die Laughing and Tribute.

In 1981, he costarred in The Chosen, based on the book of the same name by Chaim Potok. The New York Times gave the film a mixed review, but noted that Benson's character Danny Saunders was "full of a gentle inquisitiveness that cannot help but win the audience's sympathy." Benson played Olympic 10,000-meter gold medalist Billy Mills in the 1983 film Running Brave. From the filming of this movie Benson implemented his training for the 1983 New York City Marathon, completing the race in 3:05:15. In 1991, he starred as the voice of Beast in the animated Disney film Beauty and the Beast, directed by Gary Trousdale and Kirk Wise, and starring alongside Paige O'Hara as Belle. Later in the 1990s he voiced lead character J.T. Marsh on the sci-fi cartoon series Exosquad.

His 2007 novel Who Stole the Funny?: A Novel of Hollywood landed Benson on the Los Angeles Times Bestseller list. Benson's medical memoir I'm Not Dead ... Yet! was released in June 2012. Outside of acting, Benson is also a musician and composer. He has composed songs in several films and has also won an RIAA Gold Records Award for writing the song "We Are Not Alone" performed by Karla DeVito on the soundtrack of the 1985 John Hughes film The Breakfast Club.

Benson has been a professor at New York University's Tisch School of the Arts, the University of Utah, the University of South Carolina and Indiana University.

== Personal life ==
Benson has been married to singer and actress Karla DeVito since July 11, 1982. The pair met while starring together in The Pirates of Penzance. Together they have two children, daughter Lyric (b. 1983) and son Zephyr (b. 1992). He practices Transcendental Meditation.

=== Health problems and activism ===
While a teenager, Benson was diagnosed with a heart murmur caused by a bicuspid aortic valve defect. He began experiencing symptoms such as dizziness and losing consciousness in his late twenties, and subsequently underwent open-heart surgery in October 1984 to repair the valve defect. He received a bovine valve transplant, which lasted fifteen years. After the bovine valve failed, Benson had a second surgery in 2000, during which he underwent the Ross procedure. For six years after his second surgery, Benson had consistent struggles with breathing. He subsequently underwent a third open-heart surgery, during which it was discovered that his breathing problems were caused by the previous procedure causing his aortic valve to buckle and close. In 2010, Benson received a delicate fourth surgery known as the "reverse Ross procedure" to correct damage to his heart.

Benson is an activist and fundraiser for heart research, which, in 2004, led him to write the book, lyrics and music for an original Off-Broadway play called Open Heart, in which he also starred. Benson also has spoken about his dealing with post-surgical cardiac depression, commenting after his fourth surgery:

They still saw your chest right down the middle, but they've done it [to me] enough that you no longer think about it as life-threatening. It's just a very tough surgery to go through. Doctors have also gotten better at helping you through the healing process. How we heal and how we deal with cardiac depression and how we can jump start our lives and get back on track. Doctors used to never talk about things like that and now they do.

== Filmography ==
=== Film ===
List of Robby Benson film credits
Year	Title	Role	Notes
1967	Wait Until Dark	Boy Tossing Ball	Uncredited
1973	Jory	Jory Walden	
1973	Jeremy	Jeremy Jones	
1975	Lucky Lady	Billy Weber	
1976	Ode to Billy Joe	Billy Joe McAllister	
1977	One on One	Henry Steele	
1978	The End	Father Dave Benson	
1978	Ice Castles	Nick Peterson	
1979	Walk Proud	Emilio Mendez	
1980	Die Laughing	Pinsky	
1980	Tribute	Jud Templeton	
1981	The Chosen	Danny Saunders	
1982	Movie Madness	Brent Falcone	
1983	Running Brave	Billy Mills	
1984	Harry & Son	Howard Keach	
1985	City Limits	Carver	
1987	Rent-a-Cop	Andrew Pitts	
1989	White Hot	Scott	Also director
1990	Modern Love	Greg	Also writer, director and producer
1991	Beauty and the Beast	The Beast/Prince Adam (voice)	
1992	Invasion of Privacy	Alex Pruitt	
1993	Deadly Exposure	Max Pierce	
1997	Beauty and the Beast: The Enchanted Christmas	The Beast/Prince Adam (voice)	Direct-to-video
1998	Belle's Magical World	The Beast/Prince Adam (voice)	Direct-to-video
1999	Belle's Tales of Friendship	The Beast/Prince Adam (voice)	Direct-to-video
2000	Dragonheart: A New Beginning	Drake (voice)	Direct-to-video
2000	The Life & Adventures of Santa Claus	Young Santa Claus (voice)	
2001	Mickey's Magical Christmas: Snowed in at the House of Mouse	The Beast/Prince Adam (voice)	Direct-to-video
2002	Just a Dream	Dr. Sturbuck	
2004	MXP: Most Xtreme Primate	Edward	
2011	Brave New World	Damon Heller	
2019	Apple Seed	Sirom	
2023	Once Upon a Studio	The Beast/Prince Adam (voice)	Short film

=== Television ===
List of Robby Benson television credits
Year	Title	Role	Notes
1971–1972	Search for Tomorrow	Bruce Carson	2 episodes
1974	Remember When	Frankie Hodges	Television film
1974	All the Kind Strangers	John	Television film
1974	Virginia Hill	Leroy Small	Television film
1975	Death Be Not Proud	Johnny Gunther	Television film
1976	One Day at a Time	Ken Anderson	Episode: "The College Man"
1976	The Last of Mrs. Lincoln	Tad Lincoln	Television film
1977	The Death of Richie	Richie Werner	Television film
1977	Our Town	George Gibbs	Television film
1982	Two of a Kind	Noel 'Nolie' Minor	Television film; Nominated — Golden Globe Award for Best Performance by an Actor in a Miniseries or Motion Picture Made for Television
1985	California Girls	Nathan Bowzer	Television film
1985	Alfred Hitchcock Presents	Ed	Episode: "Method Actor"
1985	The Greatest Adventure: Stories from the Bible	David (voice)	Episode: "David and Goliath"
1986	Tough Cookies	Det. Cliff Brady	6 episodes
1986	David and Goliath	David (voice)	Video short
1989	For Jenny with Love	Bud	TV series
1990	The Hitchhiker	Bart Allen	Episode: "Tourist Trap"
1991–1993	The Legend of Prince Valiant	Prince Valiant (voice)	65 episodes
1991	Evening Shade	Skeeter Hatfield	Episode: "Winning Isn't Everything"
1992	P.J. Sparkles	Blaze (voice)	Television film
1992	Batman: The Animated Series	Wilkes (voice)	Episode: "P.O.V."
1992	Wild West C.O.W.-Boys of Moo Mesa	Additional voices	3 episodes
1992	Homewrecker	David Whitson	Television film
1992	Lincoln	William Stoddard (voice)	Television film
1993	Road to Avonlea	Jonathan Ravenhurst Blackwell	Episode: "The Disappearance"
1993	At Home with the Webbers	Roger Swade	Television film
1993	Precious Victims	Robert Sims	Television film
1993–1994	Exosquad	Lt./Lt. Cmdr J.T. Marsh (voice)	52 episodes
1994	The Magic School Bus	Archibald Seedplot (voice)	Episode: "Goes to Seed"
1996	O. Henry's Christmas	Jim Dillingham Young	Television film
1996	Caroline in the City	Robby Benson	Episode: "Caroline and the Movie"
1996–1997	Sabrina the Teenage Witch	Edward Spellman	2 episodes
1997	Seinfeld	Vincent (voice)	Episode: "The Comeback"
2000	The Christmas Lamb	Asah (voice)	Animated television film
2001	The Huntress	Dana Weatherly	Episode: "Who Are You?"
2001–2002	House of Mouse	The Beast/Prince Adam (voice)	7 episodes
2002–2003	American Dreams	Professor Witt	8 episodes
2019	A Feeling of Home	Wes Porter	Hallmark Channel Television Film
2025	Severance	Dr. Mauer	4 episodes

=== Video games ===
List of Robby Benson video game credits
Video games
Year	Title	Role	Notes
1992	King's Quest VI: Heir Today, Gone Tomorrow	Prince Alexander (voice)	
2000	Disney's Beauty and the Beast Magical Ballroom	The Beast/Prince (voice)	
2002	Kingdom Hearts	The Beast/Prince (voice)	
2006	Kingdom Hearts II	The Beast/Prince (voice)	
2011	Kinect Disneyland Adventures	The Beast/Prince (voice)	
2022	Cookie Run Kingdom	Beast Cookie (voice)	
2023	Disney Speedstorm	The Beast/Prince (voice)	
2023	Disney Dreamlight Valley	The Beast/Prince (voice)	

== Theatre ==
List of Robby Benson theatre credits
Year	Title	Role	Notes
1969	Zelda	David Hartman	Broadway
1970	The Rothschilds	Young Solomon Rothschild	Broadway
1981	The Pirates of Penzance	Frederic	Broadway
2004	Open Heart	Jimmy	Off-Broadway

== Production credits ==
=== Director ===
- White Hot (1989)
- Modern Love (1990)
- Family Album (TV Series) – 4 episodes
  - 1.3 "Guardian Angel" (1993)
  - 1.4 "Winter, Spring, Summer or Fall All You Gotta Do Is Call..." (1993)
  - 1.5 "Salon, Farewell, Auf Wiedersehn, Goodbye" (1993)
  - 1.6 "Will You Still Feed Me?" (1993)
- Evening Shade (TV Series) – 8 episodes
  - 3.14 "Private School" (1993)
  - 3.22 "Teaching Is a Good Thing" (1993)
  - 3.24 "The Graduation" (1993)
  - 4.8 "Wood and Evan's Excellent Adventure" (1993)
  - 4.11 "Chain of Fools" (1993)
  - 4.12 "Sleepless in Arkansas" (1993)
  - 4.14 "The People's Choice" (1994)
- Monty (TV Series) – 2 episodes
  - 1.3 "The Son Also Rises" (1994)
  - 1.6 "Baby Talk" (1994)
- Muddling Through (TV Series) – 2 episodes
  - 1.2 "Let It Be Normal" (1994)
  - 1.5 "Second Time's the Charm" (1994)
- Good Advice (TV Series) – 2 episodes
  - 2.3 "Divorce, Egyptian Style" (1994)
  - 2.12 "Lights, Camera, Friction!" (1994)
- The George Wendt Show (TV Show) – 1 episode
  - 1.2 "A Need for See" (1995)
- Bringing Up Jack (TV Series) – 1 episode
- Thunder Alley (TV Series) – 21 episodes
  - 1.2 "The Love Triangle" (1994)
  - 1.4 "Girls' Night Out" (1994)
  - 1.5 "Bloodsuckers" (1994)
  - 1.6 "Happy Endings" (1994)
  - 2.1 "Never Say Die" (1994)
  - 2.2 "Speak No Evil" (1994)
  - 2.3 "Easy Money" (1994)
  - 2.4 "Get a Job" (1994)
  - 2.5 "First Date" (1994)
  - 2.6 "Give 'Em Hell, Bobbi" (1994)
  - 2.7 "Sex, Lies & Popcorn" (1994)
  - 2.8 "The Garage Sale" (1994)
  - 2.9 "Accidentally at First Sight" (1995)
  - 2.10 "Are We There Yet?" (1995)
  - 2.12 "The Trouble with Harry" (1995)
  - 2.13 "Workin' Man's Blues" (1995)
  - 2.14 "A Little Me Time" (1995)
  - 2.15 "I Am Spartacus" (1995)
  - 2.17 "Just a Vacation" (1995)
  - 2.18 "Buzz Off, Buzzard Boy" (1995)
  - 2.19 "No Swing Set" (1995)
- Dream On (TV Series) – 1 episodes
  - 6.1 "Try Not to Remember" (1995)
- Ellen (TV Series) – 25 episodes
  - 3.1 "Shake, Rattle and Rumble" (1995)
  - 3.2 "These Successful Friends of Mine" (1995)
  - 3.3 "The Shower Scene" (1995)
  - 3.4 "The Bridges of L.A. County" (1995)
  - 3.5 "Hello, I Must Be Going" (1995)
  - 3.6 "Trick or Treat - Who Cares?" (1995)
  - 3.7 "She Ain't Friendly, She's My Mother" (1995)
  - 3.8 "Salad Days" (1995)
  - 3.9 "The Movie Show" (1995)
  - 3.10 "What's Up, Ex-Doc?" (1995)
  - 3.11 "Ellen's Choice" (1995)
  - 3.12 "Do You Fear What I Fear?" (1995)
  - 3.13 "Horschak's Law" (1996)
  - 3.14 "Morgan, P.I." (1996)
  - 3.15 "Oh, Sweet Rapture" (1996)
  - 3.16 "Witness" (1996)
  - 3.17 "Ellen: With Child" (1996)
  - 3.18 "Lobster Diary" (1996)
  - 3.19 "Two Ring Circus" (1996)
  - 3.20 "A Penney Saved..." (1996)
  - 3.21 "Too Hip for the Room" (1996)
  - 3.22 "Two Mammograms and a Wedding" (1996)
  - 3.23 "Go Girlz" (1996)
  - 3.24 "When the Vow Breaks: Part 1" (1996)
  - 3.26 "When the Vow Breaks: Part 2" (1996)
- Life with Roger (TV Series) – 1 episode
- Pearl (TV Series) – 1 episodes
  - 1.2 "Teacher's Pet" (1996)
- Common Law (TV Series) – 1 episodes
  - 1.1 "Pilot" (1996)
- Sabrina, the Teenage Witch (TV Series) – 3 episodes
  - 1.1 "Pilot" (1996)
  - 1.10 "Sweet & Sour Victory (1996)
  - 1.17 "First Kiss" (1997)
- Friends (TV Series) – 6 episodes
  - 1.22 "The One with the Ick Factor" (1995)
  - 3.12 "The One with All the Jealousy" (1997)
  - 3.13 "The One Where Monica and Richard Are Just Friends" (1997)
  - 3.14 "The One with Phoebe's Ex-Partner" (1997)
  - 3.18 "The One with the Hypnosis Tape" (1997)
  - 3.24 "The One with the Ultimate Fighting Champion" (1997)
- House Rules (TV Series) – 1 episodes
  - 1.7 "Who Knew?" (1998)
- The Naked Truth (TV Series) – 14 episodes
  - 2.8 "The Scoop" (1997)
  - 2.9 "The Birds" (1997)
  - 3.1 "Things Change" (1997)
  - 3.2 "Her Girl Friday" (1997)
  - 3.3 "Bully for Dave" (1997)
  - 3.4 "Liesl Weapon" (1997)
  - 3.5 "Bridesface Revisited" (1997)
  - 3.7 "Look at Me! Look at Me!" (1997)
  - 3.12 "Women on the Verge of a Rhytidectomy" (1998)
  - 3.13 "8 1/2" (1998)
  - 3.14 "The Neighbor of Bath" (1998)
  - 3.15 "Day of the Locos" (1998)
  - 3.17 "Born to Be Wilde" (1998)
  - 3.16 "Muddy for Nothing" (1998)
- Reunited (TV Series) – 1 episodes
- Brother's Keeper (TV Series) – 1 episode
  - 1.12 "The Date" (1999)
- Jesse (TV Series) – 8 episodes
  - 1.2 "Goober Up the Nose" (1998)
  - 1.3 "Bees Do It, Birds Do It, But Not in a Car" (1998)
  - 1.4 "Live Nude Girls" (1998)
  - 1.5 "Boo! He's Back" (1998)
  - 1.6 "The Methadone Clinic" (1998)
  - 1.7 "The Kiss" (1998)
  - 1.8 "The Cheese Ship" (1998)
  - 1.13 "My Casual Friend's Wedding" (1999)
- Dharma & Greg (TV Series) – 1 episode
  - 4.7 "Mad Secretaries and Englishmen" (2000)
- Two Guys, a Girl and a Pizza Place (TV Series) – 2 episodes
  - 4.10 "Rescue Me" (2000)
  - 4.19 "The Love Boat" (2001)
- The Huntress (TV Series) – 4 episodes
  - 1.10 "Black Widow" (2001)
  - 1.15 "Generations" (2001)
  - 1.19 "Undercover" (2001)
  - 1.23 "Showdown" (2001)
- Bob Patterson (TV Series) – 1 episodes
  - 1.5 "Bathroom Bob" (2001)
- 8 Simple Rules (TV Series) – 2 episodes
  - 2.2 "Sex Ed" (2003)
  - 2.3 "Donny Goes AWOL" (2003)
- I'm with Her (TV Series) – 2 episodes
  - 1.9 "Meet the Parent" (2003)
  - 1.10 "The Greatest Christmas Story Ever Told" (2003)
- Baby Bob (TV Series) – 2 episodes
  - 2.6 "You Don't Know Jack" (2003)
  - 2.5 "Boys Will Be Girls" (2003)
- Complete Savages (TV Series) – 1 episode
  - 1.5 "Car Jack" (2004)
- Billy: The Early Years (2008)

=== Producer ===
- Die Laughing (1980)
- Modern Love (1990)
- Caligo (2014)
- Unwelcome (2014)
- Calypso (2014)
- Straight Outta Tompkins (2015)

=== Writer ===
- One on One (1977)
- Die Laughing (1980)
- Modern Love (1990)
- Betrayal of the Dove (1993)

=== Composer ===
- Walk Proud (1979)
- Unwelcome (2014)
- Straight Outta Tompkins (2015)

== Discography ==
=== Singles ===
- "Blue Balloon (The Hourglass Song)" (1973)
- "Hey Everybody" (1974)
- "A Rock and Roll Song" (1975)
- "Adios Yesterday" (1979)
- "All I Want Is Love" (1980)

== Awards and nominations ==
List of Robby Benson awards and nominations
Year	Award	Category	Title	Result
1974	Golden Globe	Most Promising Newcomer – Male	Jeremy	Nominated
1980	Stinker Award	Worst Actor; Worst Fake Accent: Male	Walk Proud	Won
1980	Stinker Award	Worst Actor	Die Laughing, Tribute	Nominated
1980	Stinker Award	Worst Song or Song Performance in a Film or End Credits	Die Laughing	Won
1980	Stinker Award	Worst Fake Accent: Male	Die Laughing	Won
1983	Golden Globe	Best Performance by an Actor in a Miniseries or Motion Picture Made for Television	Two of a Kind	Nominated
1985	Razzie Awards	Worst Supporting Actor	Harry & Son	Nominated
1993	Grammy Award	Album of the Year	Beauty and the Beast	Nominated
1995	CableACE Award	Directing a Comedy Series	Dream On	Nominated
