= Karla DeVito =

American singer and actress (born 1953)

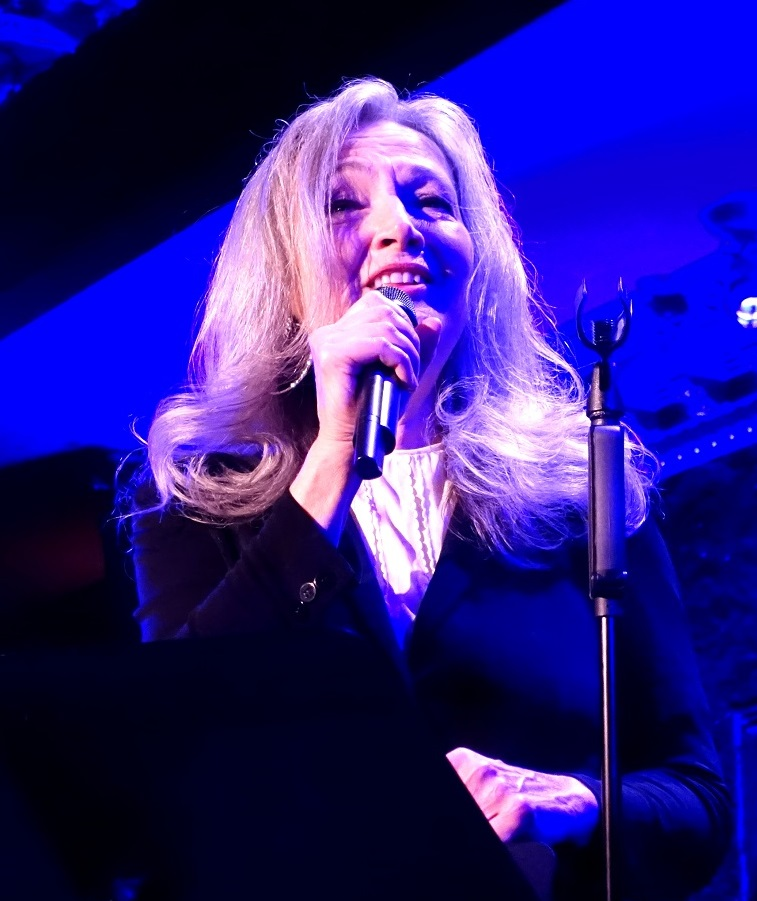
- DeVito in 2015
- Born: May 29, 1953 (age 73); Mokena, Illinois, U.S.
- Occupations: Singer; actress
- Years active: 1973–present
- Spouse: Robby Benson (m. 1982)
- Children: 2
- Musical career
- Genres: Rock; hard rock; heavy metal; progressive rock; musical theatre; pop
- Instrument: Vocals
- Label: Epic
- Website: KarlaJayneDeVito.com

Karla DeVito (born May 29, 1953) is an American singer and actress.

== Early life and education ==
DeVito was born in Mokena, Illinois. She attended Willow Crest Grade School in Mokena and Lincoln-Way High School in New Lenox. She attended Loyola University Chicago and majored in theater. During her freshman year, she joined the Chicago cast of Godspell. In 1971–72, Karla studied with Jo Forsberg at the Second City Company in Chicago and was part of the Second City Children's Theatre group with Bill Murray. In 1973, she was in the cast of the musical Hair.

== Career ==
DeVito started her career in 1972, joining the national company of Godspell. A few years later, she became the lead singer of the band Orchestra Luna. She joined the cast of Jim Steinman's show Neverland, which had a run as a workshop production at the Kennedy Center in 1977.

Two months later, DeVito went on tour with Meat Loaf and Jim Steinman with their album Bat Out of Hell. She is seen singing with Meat Loaf in the video clip of "Paradise by the Dashboard Light" and "Bat Out of Hell", synced to the original vocals by Ellen Foley. After completing this tour, she returned to theatre in an off-broadway version of Cole Porter's Jubilee and LaMama's production of A Midsummer Night's Dream. She then moved on to playing the lead role in The Pirates of Penzance on Broadway, where she met future husband, Robby Benson.

She performed on Jim Steinman's only solo album, Bad for Good, on the track "Dance in My Pants" and its subsequent music video.

In 1981, DeVito released her debut solo album, Is This a Cool World or What? and the track Bloody Bess was intended to be a rock musical about a female pirate in the 17th century.

DeVito also contributed background vocals for some groups such as Blue Öyster Cult and the band Sorrows. As a solo performer, she opened shows for Hall & Oates and Rick Springfield in the 1980s.

DeVito's second album, Wake 'Em Up in Tokyo was released by A&M in 1986. Her song, "We Are Not Alone", was featured in the 1985 film The Breakfast Club. In 1989, DeVito performed in South Carolina and returned in 1990 as part of "An Evening of Andrew Lloyd Webber". In 1990, DeVito co-starred in the film Modern Love and sang on two of the songs for the soundtrack. In 1993 DeVito co-starred in 90s cartoon series Bonkers as the voice of Officer Miranda Wright. In 2002, DeVito sang the part of Elizabeth for the CD recording of Graham Russell's rock opera The Heart of the Rose which had a limited release on CD. In 2016, she contributed vocals to Meat Loaf's Braver Than We Are.

== Personal life ==
DeVito married actor, director, singer, and teacher Robby Benson on July 11, 1982. The couple have two children, a son and a daughter.

== Discography ==
=== Studio albums ===
- Is This a Cool World or What? (1981)
- Wake 'Em Up In Tokyo (1986)

=== Guest appearances ===
- "Dance In My Pants" with Jim Steinman (from Bad for Good) (1981)
- "I'm Just Happy to Be Here" with Ellen Foley (from Fighting Words) (2021)

=== Soundtrack appearances ===
- "We Are Not Alone" (from The Breakfast Club) (1985)

== Filmography ==
=== Film ===
Year	Title	Role	Notes
1982	Two of a Kind	Barbara	Television film
1990	Modern Love	Billie	
1996	O. Henry's Christmas	Della	Television film
2015	Straight Outta Tompkins	Jane	

=== Television ===
Year	Title	Role	Notes
1992–1993	The Legend of Prince Valiant	Lady Megan, Elizabeth, Princess Sadisa	Voice, 3 episodes
1993	Family Album	Mrs. DeVito	Episode: "Winter, Spring, Summer or Fall All You Gotta Do Is Call..."
1993	Bonkers	Officer Miranda Wright	Voice, 20 episodes
1995	Phantom 2040	Athena	Voice, episode: "A Boy and His Dog"
1996	Road Rovers	Woman Soldier	Voice, episode: "A Storm from the Pacific"
1996	Sabrina the Teenage Witch	Mary	Episode: "A Girl and Her Cat"
1997	The New Batman Adventures	Cassidy	Voice, episode: "Torch Song"
1997	Fired Up	Woman	Episode: "Truth and Consequences"
