= Davita's Harp =

1985 novel by Chaim Potok

- First edition
- Author: Chaim Potok
- Language: English
- Published: 1985 (Alfred A. Knopf)
- Publication place: United States
- Media type: Print (hardcover)
- Pages: 371 pp (first edition)
- ISBN: 0-394-54290-8
- OCLC: 11235019

Davita's Harp is a novel by Chaim Potok, published in 1985. It is the only one of Potok's full-length novels to feature a female protagonist.

== Composition and publication ==
Several elements in Davita's Harp come from the author's life. The harp in the title, for example, was inspired by an actual door harp that Potok and his wife came upon in a Vermont country store in the summer of 1983. Likewise, in her youth the author's wife Adena was also, like Ilana Davita, denied an academic prize due to her gender.

== Plot summary ==
In New York City of the 1930s, Ilana Davita Chandal is the child of a mixed marriage: a Polish Jewish immigrant mother and a Christian father from an old and wealthy New England family. Both of her parents are haunted by bitter and violent memories from their youths, and both have, in consequence, turned their backs on their pasts in order to become active members of the Communist Party. Ilana's early childhood is fraught with mystery and struggle as the neighbors eye the Chandal family with suspicion. When Michael Chandal, already wounded once in the Spanish Civil War, returns to Spain, Ilana begins to look for answers at the local synagogue and in friendship with observant Jews, including her neighbor Ruthie Helfman and her distant cousin, David Dinn. Michael Chandal is killed in Spain, at Guernica, and Ilana and her mother both struggle to cope with their grief. They are often at odds with each other as Ilana becomes more and more interested in traditional Judaism—even asserting her right to say kaddish for her non-Jewish father—while Anne Chandal devotes herself to the Party and becomes involved in a new relationship with a young Communist historian, Charles Carter. When Stalin signs a non-aggression pact with Hitler, Anne struggles with reconciling the communist cause with the geopolitical reality and leaves the Party. Soon after Carter breaks off their engagement. Ultimately Anne returns—though not with her daughter's fervor—to religious observance and marries her cousin Ezra Dinn, whom she had rejected many years before. Ilana becomes a star student at her Jewish day school. She is devastated when she is unjustly denied an academic award on account of her gender, but she remains determined to make her mark on the world.

A subplot involves the mystical European Jewish writer Jakob Daw, another former suitor of Anne Chandal. He is deported from the United States against his will— in spite of the best efforts of his lawyer, Ezra Dinn—and dies in Europe soon afterwards. Anne Chandal, now Dinn, unconventionally decides to say kaddish for her old friend, even though she is a woman and women did not say kaddish in Orthodox synagogues in the 1940s.

== Characters ==
Ilana Davita Chandal (later Dinn) – Main character, very intelligent for her age but is still frightened of many things. Avid reader who loves to use her imagination, later in the book becomes a great writer and semi-religious daughter of Anne and Michael Chandal.

Anne "Channah" Chandal (later Dinn) - Ilana's mother, a Communist who is devoted to serving her party, she is anti-religion but was once a devoted Jew, is married to Michael Chandal and has a dark past.

Michael Chandal - Ilana's father, a journalist and a Communist, he is a source of great happiness in the house, he goes overseas to Spain to write for his newspaper about the Spanish Civil War and is killed during a bomb raid while trying to save a nun, a fact that Ilana becomes infatuated with. Husband to Anne Chandal and biological father to Ilana Davita.

Sarah Chandal - Ilana's aunt, a Christian missionary and a nurse who sometimes works in war zones and is very upbeat. She helps both Ilana and her mother when they fall into depression. She is Michael Chandal's sister. Often on her visits she tries to teach Ilana her Christian practices, however is not around enough for her teachings to set in and only manages to cause Ilana trouble in her shul and with the Dinns.

Jakob Daw - a writer who is a close friend of Anne Chandal, insists on calling Ilana 'Ilana Davita'. Writes stories in support of the communist party and was gassed in World War I. He was especially notable for his close relation to Ilana, who commonly referred to him as her "uncle" and who she "loved."

Ezra Dinn - an immigration lawyer and devoted Jew who is a cousin of Anne Chandal, he helps Jakob Daw with his visa into the U.S. and later marries Anne Chandal after Michael Chandal's death in Spain.

David Dinn - Ezra Dinn's bookish son, who is the same age as Ilana. He is very smart for his age and goes to a private Jewish academy, he befriends Ilana and later becomes her stepbrother.

Ruthie Helfman - a friend of Ilana's whose family helps Ilana when her mother is in her severely depressed state.

Mr. Helfman - Ruthie's father; headmaster and teacher at the Jewish school that Ilana later attends with David and Ruthie. He is forced to award Reuven with the Akiva award after the board refuses to allow a girl to win the award, which would ruin the schools accountability (turning it into a "school for wives").

Reuven Malter - An athletic, popular classmate of Ilana's and the runner up for the Akiva Award. Although the school offered him the Akiva award, he refused it saying "I don't want anything I don't earn, Ilana ... It wasn't mine, it was yours. What they did wasn't right". Reuven was a main character in Potok's first and second novels (The Chosen and The Promise).

Charles Carter - a Communist history professor who courts Anne Chandal.

== Themes ==
In a public lecture, Chaim Potok stated that, " Davita's Harp is a confrontation between two fundamentalisms. . . the secular fundamentalism represented by Marxism, Stalinism, and communism, and the religious fundamentalism of the extreme right in my own [Jewish] tradition, and how those two fundamentalisms deeply hurt individuals profoundly committed to them, and what those individuals do in the wake of that pain.

A major theme of Davita's Harp is the manner in which world events intersect with and shape individual lives. So, for example, Michael Chandal's experiences at Centralia change his life course and inspire him to become a Communist; Michael is killed while reporting on the Spanish Civil War, sending his wife and daughter into a tailspin; and Stalin's pact with Hitler ends Anne Chandal and Charles Carter's romance.

== Reception ==
Being Potok's sixth novel, Davita's Harp was reviewed by a number of major publications. Though critics were not uniformly glowing, the general consensus said that Davita's Harp was a high-quality book, though not the author's best. Cynthia Grenier (who reviewed the book for The Wall Street Journal) and an unnamed critic from Kirkus Reviews cited "stiff dialogue and stilted characters" and a "...somewhat YA-ish quality" in the narration, respectively. With regards to plot, biographer Edward A. Abramson felt that as with his other novels, Potok's tendency to forego emphasis of a book's dramatic moments continues here, leading to a "flattening effect". Yet, despite these deficiencies in style, most critics were taken with Potok's depiction of Ilana Davita. An unnamed reviewer in Booklist wrote, "Ilana's perceptions of the harsh world of her parents is a stunning one, especially as balanced against the yearnings and disappointments of her own life" while Marcia R. Hoffman (reviewing for Library Journal) wrote, "Potok's insight into the mind and heart of an adolescent girl...will not be quickly forgotten". In addition to the novel's protagonist, reviewers found much to like in Potok's treatment of what had become at that point standard themes for him. Quoting from the Kirkus Reviews article on the Davita's Harp: "...the ideas here are rich, provocative, thickly interesting: the soul's desire for sustainable faith, the tension between political, worldly justice and religious, spiritual justice."

== Sequels ==
Several reviewers and the author himself have alluded to a sequel or sequels to Davita's Harp, Though such a novel was never written, Ilana Dinn does reappear in the Potok's 2001 collection Old Men at Midnight.
