= In the Beginning (novel) =

1975 novel by Chaim Potok

- First edition
- Author: Chaim Potok
- Language: English
- Publication date: 1975
- Publication place: United States

In the Beginning is the 1975 fourth novel by Chaim Potok. The novel tells the story of David Lurie, an Orthodox Jewish boy from the Bronx growing up in the Great Depression of the 1930s up to the revealing of the fate of the Lurie family's relatives in Poland at the end of World War II.

== Plot ==
At the beginning of the novel, David Lurie is a six-year-old boy growing up in the Bronx in the late 1920s. David is a smart and sensitive boy who is frequently ill due to an injury suffered as a newborn: a deviated septum caused by a fall onto the stone steps of their apartment as his parents were bringing him home from the hospital.

David's mother and father, both Polish Jews from Lemberg, had emigrated to the United States after the war along with many of their friends, seeking a better life in a country less hostile to Jews. David's mother Ruth was first married to Max's brother David, who was killed in a pogrom following the war, after which Max married Ruth as prescribed by Jewish law. The main character David is often said to resemble his dead Uncle David with his love of reading and sensitive nature.

Max, who had been a member of the Polish army only to come home to anti-Semitic persecution, founded a group called the Am Kedoshim Society ("nation of holy people") with many friends who had served with him in the war, with the goal of actively fighting anti-Semites. After the war, Max sought to move all of the members of the society from Poland to America, as well as his and his wife's parents and extended families. The two families resist making such a drastic change and ultimately decide not to leave Poland, but the final member of the Society arrives in America just before the stock market crash of 1929. After the crash, the society's finances are decimated, its members scatter to more affordable areas of New York, and Max sinks into a depression, feeling that he has made a terrible mistake in encouraging everyone to move to a land that is seemingly no longer prosperous. Max eventually recovers and decides to become a watchmaker; beginning with a small watch repair business, he eventually starts a small chain of jewelry stores.

During World War II, the German invasion of Poland cuts off contact between the Luries and their families there. After the war ends, the Luries learn that everyone in both families—nearly one hundred and fifty people—were killed in Bergen Belsen.

During the course of the novel, David develops an interest in Bible scholarship, and eventually discovers secular authors who discuss the human origins of the Bible, in direct opposition to the belief that the Bible is the word of God as revealed to Moses on Mount Sinai. David perceives an edge of anti-Semitism in many of these works, but finds it difficult to ignore the scholarly arguments these authors are making. David's ultimate destiny is to become a Bible scholar who is still a person of faith—to employ modern methods to make a new beginning for his people.
