= Allan Katz =

American screenwriter

- Born: Chicago, Illinois, United States
- Occupation(s): Writer, producer, actor, director
- Years active: 1960–present

Allan Katz (born in Chicago, Illinois) is an American writer, producer, actor, and director.

He began his writing career as an advertising copywriter. In 1970 he created the original award-winning campaign for the popcorn snack Screaming Yellow Zonkers which was the first major product to be packaged in a predominantly black box. Every panel of the box was covered by absurd copy and illustrations. Katz wrote the copy on the first several boxes, and wrote and produced the TV and radio campaign.

Katz was hired to be one of the youngest writers on Rowan and Martin's Laugh-In and moved to Los Angeles. While working on Laugh-In, he also wrote episodes of Sanford and Son, All in the Family, and The Mary Tyler Moore Show.

He went on to both write and produce other series including M*A*S*H (TV series), The Cher Show, Rhoda, and Roseanne.

In 1989 Katz wrote and starred in the film Big Man on Campus (Originally titled, The Hunchback of UCLA, released in the UK as The Hunchback Hairball of L.A.).

Katz wrote the libretto for the musical Zapata (music by Harry Nilsson) the multiple award-winning Off-Broadway musical, Song of Singapore, and the comedy, Partners starring Alan Rosenberg.

Katz is also an essayist who has been published in The New York Times and the Los Angeles Times and has taught writing at UCLA Extension Writers' Program and at Lawrence University in Appleton, WI, where recently, in conjunction with their film studies program, he completed directing his feature "Bucky and the Squirrels" which had a limited theatrical release in February 2018.

Married November 30, 1985 (Ancestry.com) to Catherine B Bergstrom (actress) who played Peg Hunnicutt in M*A*S*H (TV series)
