= The Chosen (1981 film) =

1981 film directed by Jeremy Kagan

- Directed by: Jeremy Kagan
- Written by: Edwin Gordon
- Based on: The Chosen; 1967 novel by Chaim Potok
- Produced by: Ely Landau
- Starring: Maximilian Schell; Rod Steiger; Robby Benson
- Cinematography: Arthur J. Ornitz
- Music by: Elmer Bernstein
- Production company: The Chosen Film Company
- Distributed by: Analysis Film Releasing Corporation; 20th Century Fox
- Release dates: 1981 (MWFF); April 30, 1982
- Running time: 107 minutes
- Country: United States
- Language: English
- Budget: $3 million
- Box office: $3.2 million

See The Chosen (disambiguation) for other than the 1981 movie

The Chosen is a 1981 American drama film directed by Jeremy Kagan, based on the best-selling book of the same name by Chaim Potok, published in 1967. It stars Robby Benson, Barry Miller, Maximilian Schell and Rod Steiger. At the 1981 Montreal World Film Festival, the film won Grand Prix of the Americas, and Steiger won best actor. Analysis Film Releasing Corp and 20th Century Fox released it in the US in April 1982.

== Plot ==
The film is set in Brooklyn. The story begins during the latter part of the Second World War. Reuven Malter is a middle-class Modern Orthodox Jewish teenager and son of David Malter, a college professor and a dedicated Zionist. At a baseball game between their schools, Reuven meets Danny Saunders, another Jewish teenage boy. This initial meeting is acrimonious: Danny accidentally injures Reuven's eye during the game, resulting in Reuven wearing an eye patch for much of the movie. When Danny goes to visit Reuven at the hospital to apologize, Reuven refuses his apology and asks him to leave. Later, Danny comes to Reuven's house to again apologize. This time, Reuven accepts his apology and the boys become friends despite their different backgrounds. Danny is the eldest son of a Hasidic Rebbe, Rebbe Saunders, the dynastic leader of the Hasidic Jews in that neighborhood, but is not close to his father. Danny has been going to the nearby public library and reading psychology books. He amazes Reuven with his ability to remember word-for-word what he has read. It turns out that Reuven's father, Professor Malter has been showing him these books. Reuven and Danny go to a Sabbath service in Danny's Hasidic community as Danny is eager for Reuven to meet his father. Danny's father, Rebbe Saunders, approves of their friendship, but disapproves of Professor Malter's writings. Rebbe Saunders wants Danny to follow family tradition and eventually succeed him as the community's leading Rabbi, but Danny seems reluctant to pursue this.

Some time later, the boys begin attending Hirsch College, a Jewish university. While Reuven finds college life exciting and challenging, Danny finds it hard to adjust to, especially when his psychology professor denounces Sigmund Freud, who fascinates Danny. During this time, World War II ends and Reuven takes Danny to his first movie. After the movie, a newsreel begins and broadcasts the horrors of the concentration camps and the genocide of over six million Jews in Europe; Rebbe Saunders is horror-stricken by this too. Shortly after this, the question arises of whether a Jewish state should be re-formed in the Land of Israel, where many Jews have emigrated. When Professor Malter goes to Chicago for a conference to debate the issue, Reuven stays with Danny's family. He meets the rest of the family, including Danny's sister Shaindel, to whom he is attracted. Eventually, the family accepts Reuven. Later, Danny gently breaks the news to Reuven that Shaindel's future marriage has already been arranged, so he can't pursue a relationship with her.

After Professor Malter returns, he becomes engrossed in the creation of Israel and writes several articles and speeches about it. This controversial issue creates friction between Hasidic and Modern Orthodox Jews. While the Modern Orthodox Jews believe that creating a Jewish state in Palestine is the right thing to do, the Hasidic Jews believe that only the Messiah will grant them Palestine. This results in Rebbe Saunders excommunicating Reuven from the family, which adds to growing friction between Danny and Reuven. Eventually, the United Nations passes a resolution that partitions the Palestine Mandate territory, laying the groundwork for the establishment of the State of Israel. Rebbe Saunders allows Reuven to come back so that the two friends can reconcile. It is also revealed that Danny plans to transfer to Columbia University to pursue a psychology degree and Reuven plans to be a rabbi. Rebbe Saunders approves of Danny's plans and finally reveals why he was so distant from Danny: when Danny was younger, his father was impressed by how much Danny remembered when he had read something; however, blessed with this great ability, Danny became a know-it-all who felt indifferent towards other people and their troubles. As a result, Rebbe Saunders had to teach him empathy and the wisdom and pain of being alone by distancing himself from Danny and thus "teaching through silence", just as Rebbe Saunders' own father had taught him. Rebbe Saunders also tells Danny to keep his Jewish faith. This results in a tearful Danny reconciling with his father. In the end, Danny and his father enjoy a good relationship, although Danny changes his appearance, such as shaving his beard, which had been an important part of his Hasidic tradition, and adopting more modern-style clothing rather than the traditional black-colored suits that he had worn up till then. Danny and Reuven part ways as Danny prepares for his new life.

== Cast ==
- Maximilian Schell as Professor David Malter
- Rod Steiger as Rebbe Saunders
- Robby Benson as Danny Saunders
- Barry Miller as Reuven Malter
- Hildy Brooks as Mrs. Saunders
- Kaethe Fine as Shaindel Saunders
- Ron Rifkin as Mr. Galanter
- Robert Burke as Levi Saunders
- Lonny Price as Davey
- Evan Handler as Sidney Goldberg
- Douglas Warhit as Sam
- Jeff Marcus as Schwartzi
- Stuart Charno as First Baseman
- John Pankow as Bully
- Richard Ziman as Bully
- Bruce MacVittie as Bully
- Val Avery as Teacher

== Reception ==
The Chosen holds a 79% approval rating on Rotten Tomatoes, based on 14 reviews. Variety called it "a first-rate adaptation" that tells a universal story. Janet Maslin of The New York Times wrote: "What The Chosen lacks in dramatic excitement, it tries hard to make up for in atmosphere".

We couldn’t get anyone from the very orthodox Hasidic groups to portray these boys [in the film]; some Hasidim had even taken ads out in Yiddish papers urging people not to participate in this movie. - Jeremy Kagan, director
