= Shot (2017 film) =

2017 American drama film directed by Jeremy Kagan

- Film poster
- Directed by: Jeremy Kagan
- Screenplay by: Anneke Campbell; William Lambom
- Story by: Anneke Campbell; Jeremy Kagan
- Produced by: Jeremy Kagan; Dave O'Brien; Josh Siegel
- Starring: Noah Wyle; Sharon Leal; Jorge Lendeborg Jr.
- Cinematography: Jacek Laskus
- Edited by: Norman Hollyn
- Music by: Bruce Broughton
- Production companies: AC Transformative Media; Outside the Box Motion Pictures; Deliberate Content
- Distributed by: Paladin
- Release date: September 22, 2017
- Running time: 89 minutes
- Country: United States
- Language: English

Shot is a 2017 American drama film directed by Jeremy Kagan and starring Noah Wyle, Sharon Leal and Jorge Lendeborg Jr.

== Cast ==
- Noah Wyle as Mark Newman
- Sharon Leal as Phoebe
- Jorge Lendeborg Jr. as Miguel
- Xander Berkeley as Dr. Roberts
- Elaine Hendrix as Nurse Marci
- Malcolm-Jamal Warner (final film role before death) as EMT Jones
- Joy Osmanski as Nurse Samantha
- Eve Kagan as Nurse Gina
- Dominic Colón as Garcia
- Tommy Day Carey as Turner
- Rafael Cebrián as Juan
- Brad Lee Wind as Anderson
- Sarah Clarke as Dr. Fisher

== Reception ==
On the review aggregator website Rotten Tomatoes, 56% of 16 critics' reviews are positive. Metacritic, which uses a weighted average, assigned the film a score of 52 out of 100, based on six critics, indicating "mixed or average" reviews.

Rich Cline of Contactmusic.com gave the film three and a half stars out of five. Gary Goldstein of the Los Angeles Times enjoyed the film, writing that "...it's the fine acting and the film's plea for sensible gun control that carry the day." Alan Zilberman of The Washington Post gave the film a negative review and wrote, "Despite flashes of brilliance, strong performances and innovative camera techniques, the film never rises above the schmaltz of an after-school special."
