= Modern Love (1990 film) =

1990 film directed by Robby Benson

- Theatrical release poster
- Directed by: Robby Benson
- Written by: Robby Benson
- Produced by: Robby Benson
- Starring: Robby Benson; Karla DeVito; Rue McClanahan; Burt Reynolds; Frankie Valli; Kaye Ballard; Cliff Bemis; Louise Lasser; Lyric Benson
- Cinematography: Christopher Tufty
- Edited by: Gib Jaffe
- Music by: Don Peake
- Production companies: Lyric Films; SVS, Inc.
- Distributed by: Triumph Films
- Release date: April 20, 1990
- Running time: 105 minutes
- Country: United States
- Language: English

Modern Love is a 1990 American comedy film written and directed by Robby Benson. The film stars Benson, Karla DeVito, Rue McClanahan, Burt Reynolds, Frankie Valli, Kaye Ballard, Cliff Bemis, Louise Lasser and Lyric Benson. The film was released on April 20, 1990, by Triumph Films.

== Plot ==
Tenderhearted and neurotic Greg is "in love with love", but finds his affections largely unrequited by those around him. At his job at Hoskins Public Relations Firm, he is frequently the butt of his coworkers jokes. He is given the task of managing Dirk Martin, an obnoxious, over-the-hill surfer who is slated to appear in his own television series. His boss, Mr. Hoskins, has roped Greg into spending time with their difficult client in the hopes that, with a long-term contract and national recognition, Dirk will be his ticket out of small-time public relations. Greg's love life is equally disastrous; his vapid girlfriend Annabell is a poor match for him, due to her very different social upbringing and overly flirtatious personality.

A pregnancy scare lands Annabell and Greg in a doctors office, which is helmed by a forbidding (and in Greg's tortured mind, downright demonic) receptionist. On a whim, Greg asks to see the urologist who shares the office, leading to an electrifying first encounter with Dr. Billie Parker. What should be a professional consultation leads to mutual attraction between Dr. Parker and the lovelorn Greg. Annabell (who is not pregnant after all, and has now attached herself to Dirk Martin) is forgotten as Greg works up the nerve to ask Dr. Parker out for a coffee date. What follows is an odyssey of self-discovery as Greg and Billie fall in love and begin to plan their life together. When Billie accepts his marriage proposal, Greg can hardly believe his luck.

At the wedding, Billie's father, Army psychologist Colonel Frank Parker reveals Billie's initial aversion to marriage and presses Greg on his childrearing views, as the Parkers are staunch Catholics. Seemingly satisfied with Greg's answers, Col. Parker warmly welcomes him into the family.

In spite of his difficult job, their increasingly overbearing parents, and his new responsibilities as a husband, Greg's life begins to find balance. He and Billie move to South Carolina and buy their first home, and soon Billie announces that she is pregnant. But the blending of families is not always smooth; Billie's mother, Evelyn, arrives and immediately takes charge of the household and Billie, who is experiencing a difficult pregnancy. After the baby's arrival, the young couple must also contend with Greg's mother, a critical woman who has her own ideas about naming the new infant.

The young couple settles into family life, but Evelyn's presence begins to wear on Greg, especially after he comes home early one day to find his mother-in-law conducting a home baptism for their daughter. Meanwhile, a restless Billie decides to try her hand at stand up comedy at a local club. Greg goes to see her and gets punched out by the bouncer as he attempts to enter. The day takes a worse turn when he comes home to find his mother-in-law packing to leave. She has sensed the tension and decides to move on, but not before counseling her daughter on healing her marriage and offering a heartfelt apology to Greg.

Dirk is still proving to be a handful, wasting the firm's time and money. At a lavish, out-of-control party, Greg finds himself tempted by a young party guest, and realizes that the perceived loss of freedom initiated by his marriage has led to contention with those close to him, especially Billie. He longs to feel creative and in love again, and realizes he is spending more time babysitting Dirk than with his own family. He grabs up daughter Chloe, goes to Hoskins, and demands a two week vacation, which he is given. Hoskins is in a good mood; Dirk's series, Brahma, has finally been cancelled, leaving him free to search out more lucrative acts.

Greg and Billie, with Chloe in tow, board a plane for Europe, but before departure, Billie is summoned by airport personnel regarding her mother, who has collapsed at home and is in the hospital. They go to see her, meeting with Col. Parker, and initially are given a good prognosis for her recovery. However, her health takes a turn for the worse, and her family is forced to say their final goodbyes, leaving Billie bereft over the loss of her mother. Winter, then spring passes while the young family grieves. One night, Greg goes to the bedroom to check on his sleeping family and is greeted by a series of images: a memory of his wedding day, dancing with his wife in joyous abandon, unaware of the challenges ahead; an image of Billie as a new mother once again, with Chloe in her arms; and images of Chloe at progressing ages, from a toddler to a lovely young woman, who tells him what his father told him so many years before, "You have the whole world at your feet".

Life goes on as Greg goes to meet with the ever-ambitious Hoskins, who is hot on the trail of a new act, a cut-rate rap duo that call themselves The Little Bastards. At home, he and Billie enjoy alone time with Chloe in school, and Greg, finally feeling like himself again, arranges a bed picnic with his wife. While they excitedly make plans for their future, Greg proposes that they have another baby. Images of their parents appear before Greg and Billie, lovingly urging them to continue their family. The images disappear, leaving the young couple in awe and in deep reflection of the meaning of life.

== Cast ==
- Robby Benson as Greg
- Karla DeVito as Billie
- Rue McClanahan as Mrs. Evelyn Parker
- Burt Reynolds as Colonel Frank Parker
- Frankie Valli as Mr. Hoskins
- Kaye Ballard as Receptionist
- Cliff Bemis as Dirk Martin
- Louise Lasser as Greg's Mom
- Lyric Benson as Chloe
- Debra Port as Annabell
- Stan Brown as Dr. Reed
- Lou Kaplan as Greg's dad
- Beth Meadows as Mary Miller
- Sharyn Greene as Shayne
- Libby Campbell as Mrs. Withers
- Dacey Parker as Chloe, 3 years old
- Jennifer Ray as Chloe, 25 years old
- Bill Mould as Billie's uncle
- George Altman as Cain
- Ann Crawford Dreher as Ma Bell
- Sarah Kimball as Jezebell
- Karen Eterovich as Marabell
- Ripley Thames as Peter
- Cindy Ott as Kathy
- Greg Benson as Jeff
- Claude Taylor III as Billie's cousin
- Christina Schulze as Mr. Hoskins' secretary
- James B. Holderman as Himself
