= Big Man on Campus =

- Directed by: Jeremy Kagan
- Written by: Allan Katz
- Produced by: Arnon Milchan
- Starring: Allan Katz; Corey Parker; Cindy Williams; Melora Hardin; Jessica Harper; Tom Skerritt
- Cinematography: Bojan Bazelli
- Edited by: Howard Smith
- Music by: Joseph Vitarelli
- Production company: Regency International Pictures
- Distributed by: Vestron Pictures
- Release date: March 14, 1989
- Running time: 105 minutes
- Country: United States
- Language: English

Big Man on Campus (also known as The Hunchback of UCLA and The Hunchback Hairball of L.A. in the United Kingdom) is a 1989 comedy film directed by Jeremy Kagan, and written by and starring Allan Katz. It is loosely based on the 1831 novel The Hunchback of Notre-Dame by Victor Hugo. The film co-stars Corey Parker.

== Plot ==
A news broadcast reports on the apparent sighting of a "mysterious creature" on the UCLA campus. Among those interviewed are underachieving student Alex Kominski and his girlfriend Cathy Adams. Although neither claim to believe in the creature's existence, a hunchbacked figure is shown looking down from the bell tower, spying on Cathy through a telescope.

While attending a renaissance-themed carnival on campus, Alex gets involved in a scuffle after insulting another student's girlfriend. When Cathy tries to intervene, the creature suddenly comes to her defense but is chased away and eventually captured by security. In court, psychiatrist Dr. Victoria Fisk labels the creature a menace to society. Cathy rejects the doctor's opinion, stating that the creature was only trying to protect her. Another witness, Dr. Richard Webster, the head of the university's Psychology department, suggests it might be possible to rehabilitate the creature.

Finally, the hunchback himself is called to the stand, where Dr. Fisk asks him who he believes is better qualified to determine his fate, Dr. Webster or herself. Demonstrating that the creature can only repeat the last thing he hears spoken, he predictably answers, "Dr. Fisk". She then humiliates him by prompting him to describe himself as a "complete and total fool". Given the evidence, Judge Ferguson orders that the hunchback be confined in a mental facility. When Cathy protests, the creature stands and acknowledges both her and the judge by name, leading the judge to overturn his ruling and award temporary custody to the university under the supervision of Dr. Webster, with the condition that should the creature exhibit any violent behavior, he will be institutionalized.

Upon being escorted back to the university, the creature shows Alex, Cathy, and Dr. Webster his home in the bell tower, cluttered with various objects scavenged from around campus. Reluctant to leave him alone in the tower, Cathy encourages Alex to stay and watch over him, with Dr. Webster offering to get him special consideration for the task from his instructors at the university. Alex reluctantly agrees.

Over the next several days, the hunchback undergoes a series of observational tests, including speech therapy with Dr. Diane Girard. Despite his unusual behavior, he learns quickly, and over time he and Alex become friends. During a session with Dr. Webster, the creature is asked to choose his own name. After settling on "Bob Maloogaloogaloogaloogalooga", he explains that after his father deserted them and his mother died from illness, a group of people came and locked him away. He then managed to escape and take up residency in the bell tower.

Despite all his progress, Bob remains infatuated with Cathy. While Alex struggles to catch up on his studies in order to pass his finals, Bob strives to better himself to win Cathy's affections. When he suddenly presents her with an engagement ring, Cathy turns him down. Heartbroken, Bob returns to the bell tower where he receives a phone call from Dr. Fisk. Desperate to prove that Bob is a danger to others, she falsely tells him that Cathy was injured in an accident. Bob immediately sprints across campus to the girls' dormitories, but is confused to find Cathy unharmed. With campus security closing in on him, Bob flees into the streets of Los Angeles.

Alex and Cathy and the rest of Bob's supporters then appear on a controversial talk show hosted by Stanley Hoyle, who attempts to demonize Bob in every way possible. When Hoyle states that Alex and the others are "in big trouble" for supporting the hunchback, Bob, who has been watching the program on television, races to his friends' aid. After taking a taxi to the studio, he makes his way in through the roof and swings down from the catwalk to snatch up Dr. Fisk. Forced to confess her lie in front of everyone, the live audience quickly turns to Bob's side, chanting his name. Stanley then apologizes to Bob for his slanderous remarks, and Dr. Webster suggests looking into a scholarship for Bob at the university. When asked by Hoyle if he would have done anything different up to this point, Bob takes Dr. Girard into his arms and kisses her at "two speeds", a reference to an intimate experience Bob once had with a Hoover vacuum cleaner. Bob then smiles sheepishly into the camera.

== Cast ==
- Allan Katz as Bob Maloogaloogaloogaloogalooga
- Corey Parker as Alex
- Cindy Williams as Dr. Diane Girard
- Melora Hardin as Cathy
- Gerrit Graham as Stanley Hoyle
- Tom Skerritt as Dr. Richard Webster
- Jessica Harper as Dr. Victoria Fisk
- John Finnegan as Judge Ferguson

== Production ==
Television comedy writer Allan Katz first came up with the premise for the film, originally titled The Hunchback of UCLA, in 1981. Katz spent eight years trying to get the film set up at various studios but often experienced stalls until producer Arnon Milchan helped get the film set up at Vestron Pictures. While Katz loved the original title, he was ultimately forced to change it after University of California, Los Angeles threatened legal action against the film.

== Release ==
Special screenings for Big Man on Campus were held by American Cinematheque and Cannes Film Market in March and May 1989 respectively. Big Man on Campus was ultimately released direct-to-video on July 31, 1991.
