= The Gift of Asher Lev =

1990 novel by Chaim Potok

The Gift Of Asher Lev
- First edition
- Author: Chaim Potok
- Cover artist: Yossi Khojahiny
- Language: English
- Published: 1990 (Knopf)
- Publication place: United States
- Media type: Print (hardback & paperback)
- Preceded by: My Name is Asher Lev

The Gift of Asher Lev is a novel by Chaim Potok, published in 1990. It is a sequel to Potok's novel My Name Is Asher Lev (1972).

== Plot summary ==
The brilliant, schismatic Hasidic painter Asher Lev is now a middle-aged man, residing with his wife and children in the south of France. When his beloved Uncle Yitzchok dies, Asher is abruptly summoned back to Brooklyn. Soon after the funeral, he learns that his uncle had secretly been collecting art for many years and has amassed a valuable collection, of which Asher is to be the trustee. Asher is dazzled and makes some tentative efforts to reconcile the Ladover Hasidic community to modern art—for example, by sketching a portrait of his uncle for his grieving father and by teaching a lesson in art appreciation at the school where his daughter has temporarily enrolled. But one of his cousins bitterly resents the art collection and hampers Asher's efforts to use it for charity in his uncle's name.

Meanwhile, Asher's parents and the rest of the Ladover community worry because the aging Ladover Rebbe has no children and has appointed no successor. What will happen to the Ladover community if the Rebbe dies before the Messiah comes? The logical candidate for next Rebbe would be Asher's father, Aryeh Lev, who has been one of the Rebbe's chief lieutenants for decades, but Asher realizes that the Rebbe is reluctant to pass the mantle of authority to Aryeh unless Aryeh has a successor—who cannot be Aryeh's only child, the iconoclast painter. Slowly, Asher realizes that the Rebbe and Aryeh both hope that Asher's five-year-old son, Avrumel, will become the ultimate successor to the Rebbeship. It is Avrumel who will be "the gift of Asher Lev."

Another strand of the plot concerns Asher's wife, Devorah, who is plagued by bitter memories of her parents' deaths in the Holocaust and of her own early childhood, spent in hiding with her cousin Max and his parents. Asher suspects Devorah will seize on her son's eventual succession to Rebbeship as some sort of vindication for her family's suffering.

In the end, Asher acquiesces in the unspoken plan of succession and decides to save his uncle's art collection until Avrumel grows up, in confidence that Avrumel will know what to do with it.

== Characters ==
Asher Lev – narrator; a middle-aged painter and Ladover Jew who resides in the south of France.

Devorah Lev – Asher's wife, an author of children's books. As a small child, Devorah was hidden in a Paris apartment for two years in order to evade the Nazi concentration camps, in which both of her parents perished.

Rocheleh Lev – Asher and Devorah's intelligent eleven-year-old daughter.

Avrumel Lev – Asher and Devorah's five-year-old son.

Max Lobe – Devorah's cousin, a French Jewish artist.

John Dorman – An alcoholic, expatriate American novelist; a friend of Asher and Devorah

Yitzchok Lev – Asher's supportive uncle who dies in the first chapter; his death inspires a tentative reconciliation between Asher and his father.

Cousin Nahum- Asher's cousin who shows him his uncle’s art collection.

Cousin Yonkel- Doesn’t like Asher at all he believes Asher and all art is from the other side. He is very rude to Asher throughout most of the story.

Aryeh Lev – Asher's father; works for the Rebbe traveling to Vienna and Russia to build yeshivas and save Jews from Communist persecution.

Rivkeh Lev – Asher's mother, now a professor.

Jacob Kahn – an artist with whom Asher studied as a youth; now an old and dying man.

== Sequels ==
Potok planned to write a third book about Asher Lev, but he never did so.
