= My Name Is Asher Lev =

Novel by Chaim Potok

- First edition
- Author: Chaim Potok
- Cover artist: Michael Mordechai
- Language: English
- Genre: Künstlerroman
- Publisher: Knopf
- Publication date: March 12, 1972
- Publication place: United States
- Media type: Print (Hardcover, Paperback)
- Pages: 370
- ISBN: 0-394-46137-1
- OCLC: 221242
- Dewey Decimal: 813/.5/4
- LC Class: PZ4.P86 My PS3566.O69
- Followed by: The Gift of Asher Lev

My Name Is Asher Lev is a novel by Chaim Potok, an American author and rabbi. The book's protagonist is Asher Lev, a Hasidic Jewish boy in New York City. Asher is a loner with artistic inclinations. His art, however, causes conflicts with his family and other members of his community. The book follows Asher's maturity as both an artist and a Jew.

Potok asserted that the conflict between tradition and individualism is constant and that the tension between religious orthopraxy and art is lifelong. Potok was, as well as an author, a painter, and his personal struggle is apparent in his painting titled "Brooklyn Crucifixion." And yet despite this seemingly agonizing struggle, Potok remained active as an artist/writer and engaged in the religion of his upbringing until his death in 2002.

Potok continued Asher Lev's story in the book The Gift of Asher Lev.

== Plot ==
Asher Lev is a boy with a prodigious artistic ability born into a Hasidic Jewish family. During his childhood in the 1950s, in the time of Joseph Stalin and the persecution of Jews and religious people in the Soviet Union, Asher's artistic inclination brings him into conflict with the members of his Jewish community, which values things primarily as they relate to faith and considers art unrelated to religious expression to be at best a waste of time and possibly a sacrilege. It brings him into particularly strong conflict with his father, Aryeh, a man who has devoted his life to serving their leader, the Rebbe, by traveling around the world bringing the teachings and practice of their sect to other Jews. Aryeh is by nature incapable of understanding or appreciating art and considers Asher's early drawings to be "foolishness."

In the middle is Asher's mother, Rivkeh, who in Asher's early childhood was severely traumatized by the death of her brother, who was killed while traveling for the Rebbe. Rivkeh is only able to emerge from her depression when she decides to continue her brother's work and obtains the Rebbe's permission to return to college to study Russian affairs. Throughout the novel she suffers anxiety for her husband's safety during his almost constant traveling, and is frequently seen waiting at the large window of their apartment for her husband or son to return home.

The Rebbe asks Asher's father to relocate to Vienna, which would make it easier to perform his work establishing yeshivas throughout Europe. Asher becomes very upset about this and refuses to move to Vienna, in spite of requests from his parents and teachers alike. Rivkeh ultimately decides to stay in Brooklyn with Asher while Aryeh moves to Vienna alone.

While Asher's father is away, Asher explores his artistic nature and neglects his Jewish studies. Asher begins to go to art museums where he studies paintings, but is not sure what to make of paintings of nudes, nor paintings of crucifixions. Aryeh, returning home after a long trip to Russia for the Rebbe, discovers some drawings Asher has made of crucifixions as a way of studying them, and is furious. Asher's father thinks that his gift is foolish and from the sitra achra ("Other Side"), and wants Rivkeh to prevent him from going to museums; however, Rivkeh, torn between the wishes of her husband and the needs of her son, knows it is pointless to forbid Asher from going.

Eventually, the Rebbe intercedes and allows Asher to study under a great living artist, Jacob Kahn, a non-observant Jew who is an admirer of the Rebbe. Jacob Kahn teaches Asher artistic techniques and art history, and encourages Asher to paint the truth, so as not to become a "whore." Meanwhile, since Asher continues to refuse to relocate to Europe, Rivkeh moves there to support Asher's father, leaving Asher to live with his uncle and apprentice with Jacob Kahn. After several years, Asher has his first art show in New York, launching his career.

Their work in Europe completed, Asher's parents move back to Brooklyn, at which point Asher decides to travel to Europe to view and study great art. He visits Florence in particular and spends many hours studying The Deposition as well as Michelangelo's David. Later, after relocating to Paris, Asher paints his masterpiece: two works that use the symbolism of the crucifixion to express his mother's anguish and torment, since there is no artistic form in the Jewish tradition to fully express these feelings. When these works are displayed at a New York art show (the first of his that Asher's parents have ever attended), the imagery so offends his parents and community that the Rebbe asks him to move away. Asher, sensing that he is destined to journey the world, to express its anguish through his art, but to cause pain by doing so, decides to return to Europe.

== Setting ==
My Name is Asher Lev is placed in the 1950s in a Hasidic Jewish community in Brooklyn, New York. Asher also studies art outside his community in New York, Massachusetts, and Europe.

== Characters ==
Asher Lev – Asher is the protagonist and narrator of the story. The book takes the reader through the first segment of Asher's life, ending when he's around 22 years of age. During his childhood, Asher is overwhelmed with his passion for drawing and painting so much that he becomes apathetic towards most of the world around him. Because of his lack of dedication and focus towards his education, the people surrounding him (mainly his father) begin to feel ashamed of what he has become. Asher isn't rebelling intentionally, but he has grown too strongly attached to his art that he can't help himself. As Asher grows older, he learns to channel his emotion and energy into his artwork and becomes immensely successful.

Jacob Kahn – Jacob Kahn is a successful artist. He freed himself from all conditioning forces such as religion, community, and popularity in an attempt to create a lifestyle in which he could express himself freely. He believes in creating balance between inner emotions and true identity. He became Asher's mentor and taught him fundamental techniques that would influence and improve the overall progression of Asher's artistic future. He is extremely firm, and usually so in a demeaning manner.

Aryeh Lev – Asher's father and an important member of the Jewish community. Deeply committed to his work for the Rebbe, he travels throughout Europe building yeshivas and saving Jews from Russian persecution. Aryeh holds a master's degree in political science and speaks English, Yiddish, French, and Russian. He highly distrusts gentiles due to his father's death at the hands of a drunken axe-wielding Christian. Aryeh does not understand art and cannot comprehend why his son would spend his life making art. He gets in many disagreements over Asher's gift which causes him to dislike his son. Aryeh is close-minded, stubborn, and has difficulty with value systems other than his own.

Rivkeh Lev – Rivkeh Lev is torn between her love of her husband and son. She struggles daily with the conflict between them. After she recovers from her illness, she returns to school to finish her brother Yaakov's work. She receives a master's degree and then pursues a doctorate in Russian affairs. Rivkeh is torn, but ultimately sides with her husband, and goes with him to Europe leaving Asher behind to live with his uncle. Rivkeh doesn't always understand Asher's art work.

The Rebbe – Leader of the Ladover Hasidic Jews, it is he who orders Aryeh to travel. The Rebbe understands Asher's gift and arranges for him to study under the tutelage of Jacob Kahn.

Yudel Krinsky – The proprietor of the shop where Asher buys supplies, he was rescued by Aryeh after spending years in Siberia. Krinsky feels that Asher shouldn't cause a good man like his father so much trouble. Despite this, he tolerates and enables the art because he is friends with Asher.

Yaakov – Asher's uncle who died in a car crash when Asher was six years old. His death had a very profound effect on Asher's mother. Rivkeh became very ill and depressed because they were very close. Like Aryeh, he travelled for the Rebbe, and this disturbs Rivkeh.

Yitzchok – Asher's wealthy uncle who supports Asher and his art skills. He is kind and generous, and gives Asher a place to stay while his parents are in Europe. Yitzchok is one of the first to recognize that Asher's ability can make a fortune, and he invests in his work. Asher lived with him for a while.

Anna Schaeffer – A very sophisticated woman and owner of the art gallery where Asher's art is displayed. Anna's work to promote Asher's works results in much recognition for Asher. She is introduced to Asher through Jacob Kahn. She is impatient, but cares about her artists.

Mrs. Rackover – The Levs' housekeeper. She knows about Siberia and understands the suffering that Yudel Krinsky experienced there. She also is one of the first people to understand Asher's artistic gifts.

== Themes ==
=== Conflicting traditions ===
This book explores conflicting traditions (in this case the tradition of Judaism and the tradition of art), father versus son, contentedness with one's life versus peace in the family (the Jewish value of "shalom bayit"), the traditional Jewish world versus secular America.

=== Suffering ===
My Name Is Asher Lev explores the nature of suffering. The discrimination that Asher's father has against Asher's artistic tendencies can be related to the suffering of the many Jews in Russia and Germany that were oppressed by the government. Just as they were oppressed and punished for their beliefs, Asher is negatively viewed by his father, his teachers, and his peers. Art is Asher's real religion, and not only he, but his mother suffers for it. When Asher tries to portray his mother's suffering, "[his] search for a motif reveals none powerful enough in [his] own tradition, and so [he] turn[s] to the central theme of suffering in the Christian tradition: crucifixion."

=== Beauty ===
Asher Lev's pursuit of art is complicated by his upbringing and training to see Jewish perspectives on beauty. Via his training, Asher Lev explores aesthetic traditions of beauty.

=== Self-identity ===
The book title itself signals Asher's issue with self-identity. Jacob Kahn tells Asher, "As an artist you are responsible to no one and to nothing, except to yourself and to the truth as you see it."

== Reception ==
Considered one of Potok's best works, it has a sequel, The Gift of Asher Lev. The first "Brooklyn Crucifixion", a work by Asher which plays a central role in the novel's conclusion, is an actual painting by Potok, who was an accomplished artist as well as a novelist and rabbi; the second Crucifixion, which is described in the book as being superior to the first, does not have a real-life counterpart.

The book is a thinly disguised depiction of the Lubavitch community. "Brooklyn Parkway", with its heavy traffic and island promenades, is a reference to Eastern Parkway. However, contrary to popular opinion, the character of Yudel Krinsky is not meant to refer to Chaim Yehuda Krinsky, one of the assistants to Rebbe Menachem Mendel Schneerson.

== Adaptation ==
In January 2009, Aaron Posner's adaptation for the stage premiered in Philadelphia at the Arden Theatre Company. It was subsequently produced by the Round House Theatre in Bethesda, Maryland in March and April 2010. In 2012, the play was staged at the Long Wharf Theatre in New Haven and by the Theatrical Outfit in Atlanta. The first New York City Off-Broadway production of the play opened at the Westside Theater on November 28, 2012. The play won the Outer Critics Circle Award for Outstanding New Off-Broadway Play and the John Gassner Award.

== See also ==
- Bildungsroman
