= Two of a Kind (1982 film) =

1982 television film featuring George Burns

- Genre: Drama
- Written by: James Sadwith
- Directed by: Roger Young
- Starring: George Burns; Robbie Benson
- Music by: James Di Pasquale
- Country of origin: United States
- Original language: English

Production
- Cinematography: Edward R. Brown
- Editor: Mike Wilcox
- Running time: 102 minutes
- Production company: Lorimar Productions

Original release
- Network: CBS
- Release: October 9, 1982

Two of a Kind is a 1982 TV movie featuring George Burns as the grandfather of a 21-year-old man with an intellectual disability played by Robby Benson.

== Cast ==
- George Burns as Ross 'Boppy' Minor
- Robby Benson as Noel 'Nolie' Minor
- Barbara Barrie as Dottie Minor
- Cliff Robertson as Frank Minor
- Frances Lee McCain as Nurse Mary
- Geri Jewell as Irene
- Ronny Cox as Ted Hahn
- Peggy McCay as Nurse Harris
- Justin Lord as Phelps

== Reception ==
The Commercial Appeal of Memphis, TN called Benson's performance an "acting achievement of the first order."

== Accolades ==
- Humanitas Award: Roger Young, director
- Golden Globes Nomination, Best Performance by an Actor in a Miniseries or Motion Picture Made for Television: Robbie Benson
- Emmy Award: Outstanding Original Music and Lyrics for “We’ll Win This World”
