= Wanderings: Chaim Potok's History of the Jews =

First edition

Wanderings: Chaim Potok's History of the Jews (ISBN 0-394-50110-1) was first published in 1978 by Alfred A. Knopf, New York. According to S. Lillian Kremer in Dictionary of Literary Biography, The book is "a compendium of scholarship about Jewish civilization and its relation to the myriad cultures with which Judaism has come into contact."

== Contents ==
This monograph is divided into four sections with each comprising various chapters: Through Ancient Paganism (Sumer, Egypt, Canaan, Babylonia), Through Classical Paganism (Greece, Rome, Palestine), Through Islam and Christianity (Islam, Christianity), Inside Modern Paganism (Secularism).

== Reception ==
School Library Journal said that it was "a highly personalized, self-consciously written history of the Jewish people... " that emphasizes "themes which pervade Jewish history: wandering and persecution".

However, Kirkus Reviews called it "picturesque but amateurish history", and Alan Mintz in The New York Times said that "as a work of historical writing, Wanderings is a mixed performance".

It was also reviewed by the Chicago Tribune The Pittsburgh Press, and Publishers Weekly

In an interview the author said that "the book is about people, not cultural dynamics. I walked through all of these cultures through the books I read, and I tried to translate abstract scholarship into people".
