= The Promise (Potok novel) =

1969 novel by Chaim Potok

- Author: Chaim Potok
- Language: English
- Genre: Novel
- Publisher: Alfred A. Knopf
- Publication date: 12 August 1969
- Publication place: United States
- Media type: Print (hardback & paperback)
- ISBN: 1-199-82130-6 (hardback edition)
- Preceded by: The Chosen

The Promise is a novel written by Chaim Potok, published in 1969. It is a sequel to his previous novel The Chosen. Set in 1950s New York, it continues the saga of the two friends, Reuven Malter, a Modern Orthodox Jew studying to become a rabbi, and Danny Saunders, a genius Hasidic Jew who has broken with his sect's tradition by refusing to take his father's place as rebbe in order to become a psychologist. The theme of the conflict between traditional and modern Orthodox Judaism that runs throughout The Chosen is expanded here against the backdrop of the changes that have taken place in Reuven and Danny's world in the period of time between the two novels: following World War II, European survivors of the Holocaust have come to America, rebuilding their shattered lives and often making their fiercely traditionalist religious viewpoint felt among their people.

== Plot summary ==
The Promise starts a year after The Chosen left off, with Danny having just started his graduate program in psychology and Reuven having started rabbinical school. The novel begins in the summer of 1950 when Reuven is dating a college student named Rachel Gordon. Rachel and Reuven take Rachel's cousin, Michael Gordon, to a carnival, where Michael has a mental breakdown over a carnival game. In the coming days, Michael's father Abraham Gordon, a secular rabbi and teacher (modeled on Mordechai Kaplan, founder of Reconstructionist Judaism), informs Reuven that Michael has a history of mental illness and that he will probably need to live in a treatment home with psychological oversight. Abraham Gordon, a friend of Reuven's father, is a controversial figure; Gordon's books, which question the existence of God but seek to reconcile these questions with Jewish tradition, have caused him to be placed in cherem; Gordon keeps a scrapbook of the many times he has been attacked in the press.

At Hirsch University, Reuven's Talmud teacher, Rav Kalman, is a rigidly religious Holocaust survivor who vehemently disapproves of Reuven's father's secular method of Talmudic study, which proposes that passages of Talmud contain scribal errors that can be deduced through critical reading of the relevant medieval commentaries and the study of variant readings. During Talmud class, Reuven and his classmates listen to Rav Kalman's regular tirades about how the modern world is destroying Jewish life. One day, he directs one of his tirades at the Zechariah Frankel Seminary, where Abraham Gordon serves as a professor. He later tells Reuven that he is not allowed to enter the Zechariah Frankel Seminary; Reuven had been seen there checking variant readings for his father's book on the critical method.

That fall, Reuven and Rachel agree that they are merely good friends (not romantic partners), and Michael is sent to live in the treatment center that Danny is doing his residency in. Danny meets Rachel when a treatment plan for Michael is being developed and they begin dating. Meanwhile, Reuven's father's book is published, which further infuriates Rav Kalman. He writes an extensive article criticizing the book's method of Talmud study after first enlisting Reuven's help in understanding the method, which infuriates Reuven. The clash between orthodoxy and modernity creates tension at the school where Reuven's father teaches, as the school's new faculty members (many of whom are Holocaust survivors) vehemently disagree with Reuven's father's ideas.

As a result of Michael's worsening condition, Danny comes up with an idea for an experiment; to completely isolate Michael in a silent room with no contact with the outside world. Abraham and Ruth (Michael's mother) Gordon agree to Danny's experiment and it begins, much to Michael's chagrin.

As Reuven's rabbinic ordination (smicha) examinations approach, Rav Kalman tells Reuven that he must make a choice: to use his father's method and fail, or to use the traditional method of Talmud study and become a rabbi. At the same time, word leaks out that there will be a new department in the university that will teach Talmud in a secular manner, which infuriates Rav Kalman. Reuven's father informs Reuven that he may be offered a position in the planned rabbinics department.

As the months pass, Michael descends into silent catatonia, which sends panic through Reuven, the Gordon family, and Danny (whose career hinges on the experiment).

Eventually, Reuven takes his smicha examinations. Deciding to be true to himself, Reuven uses his father's method of emending the text of the Talmud in order to clarify more complicated passages. This surprises even the dean and the more progressive Rav Gershenson (who was Reuven's teacher in The Chosen and is modeled on Rabbi Joseph B. Soloveitchik), yet the two men are impressed with Reuven's knowledge and creativity. On the other hand, Rav Kalman appears to be angered and annoyed.

In the end, Rav Kalman gives Reuven smicha, stating that although he vehemently disagrees with his methods, he can hear the love of Jewish text in his voice, something he had not heard since his students were killed in the Holocaust. As a compromise between the school and Rav Kalman, Reuven's father's cannot teach in the rabbinics department at Hirsch, yet Reuven is given a post in the department, where he will be allowed to use the critical method, and where Rav Kalman promises to fight with him about it. Reuven's father instead accepts a post at the Zechariah Frankel Seminary. At Reuven's graduation ceremony Rav Kalman and Reuven's father politely shake hands and Rav Kalman tells him that he has never had a student with more audacity than Reuven, yet he has also never had a student with more respect.

After months of confinement, Michael finally talks when Reuven visits and mentions that Rav Kalman is giving him smicha—the same Rav Kalman who had attacked Reuven's father in the press. Michael reveals that his anger and other problems stem from the fact that his father is an outspoken secular rabbi who is hated and attacked, which made Michael feel alienated and uncomfortable; he hates his father and his mother, and yet, he also loves them, and fears that his hate will hurt them irreparably. Michael secretly wished the elder Malter's work would prevent Reuven from receiving smicha, and therefore, Reuven would hate his father, and have something in common with Michael. Having expressed his true feelings, he embraces his parents and is now ready to begin traditional therapy with Danny.

Rachel and Danny marry, and at the wedding, Danny tells Reuven that he will write his doctoral dissertation on his experiment with Michael. The novel ends where it starts, with the Malters and Gordons on vacation in the country.

== Reception ==
Stanley Cohen, in a review in The Montreal Star, thought that while the world of The Promise was a "limited one", Potok excelled when "describing the world of rabbinics he knows well." Theodore M. O'Leary, of The Kansas City Star, opined that Potok did not seem like "a natural novelist", with parts of the book coming across as "flat" and with dialogue which failed to engage the reader's emotions.
