= Chaim Potok =

American author and rabbi (1929–2002)

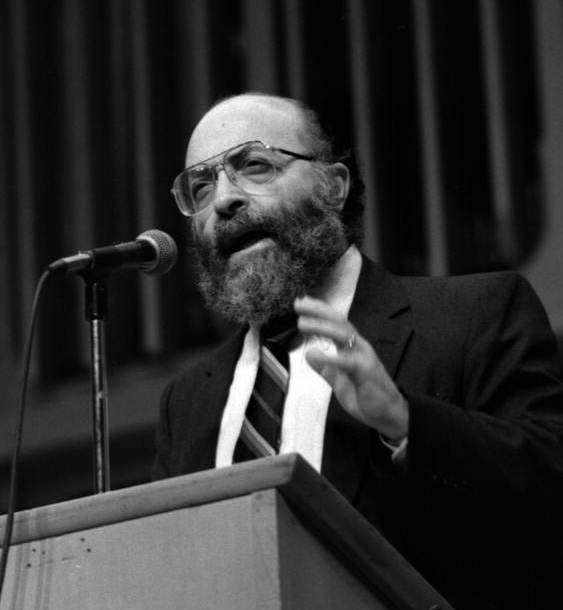
- Potok in 1986
- Born: Herman Harold Potok; February 17, 1929; The Bronx, New York City, U.S.
- Died: July 23, 2002 (aged 73); Merion, Pennsylvania, U.S.
- Education: Yeshiva University (BA); University of Pennsylvania (PhD)
- Occupations: Novelist, rabbi, painter
- Spouse: Adena Potok
- Children: Rena Potok; Naama Potok; Akiva Potok
- Writing career
- Genre: Literary fiction

Signature
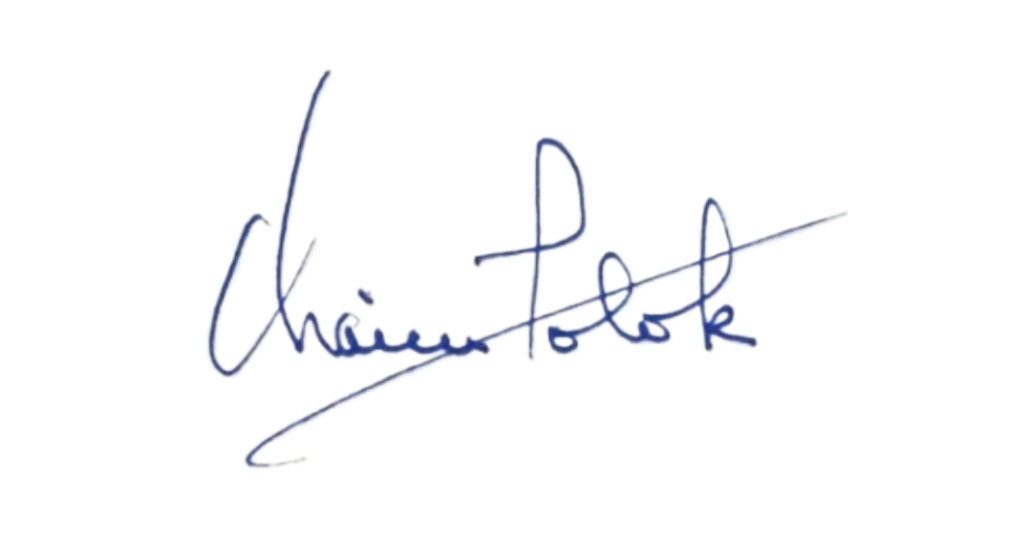

Chaim Potok (February 17, 1929 – July 23, 2002), was an American author, novelist, playwright, editor and rabbi. Among the more than a dozen books he authored, his first novel The Chosen (1967) was listed on The New York Times Best Seller list for 39 weeks and sold more than 3.4 million copies as of 2002, and was adapted into a well-received 1981 feature film by the same title.

== Biography ==
Herman Harold Potok was born in the Bronx, New York City, to Benjamin Max Potok (died 1958) and Mollie (née Friedman; died 1985), Jewish immigrants from Poland. He was the oldest of four children, all of whom either became or married rabbis. His Hebrew name was Chaim Tzvi (חיים צבי). He received an Orthodox Jewish education. After reading Evelyn Waugh's novel Brideshead Revisited (1945) as a teenager, Potok decided to become a writer (he often said that Brideshead Revisited was what inspired his work and writing). He started writing fiction at the age of 16. At age 17, he made his first submission to the magazine The Atlantic Monthly. Although it was not published, he received a note from the editor complimenting his work. He attended high school at Marsha Stern Talmudical Academy, Yeshiva University's boys high school.

In 1949, at the age of twenty, Potok's stories were published in the literary magazine of Yeshiva University, which he also helped edit. In 1950, he graduated summa cum laude with a BA in English Literature.

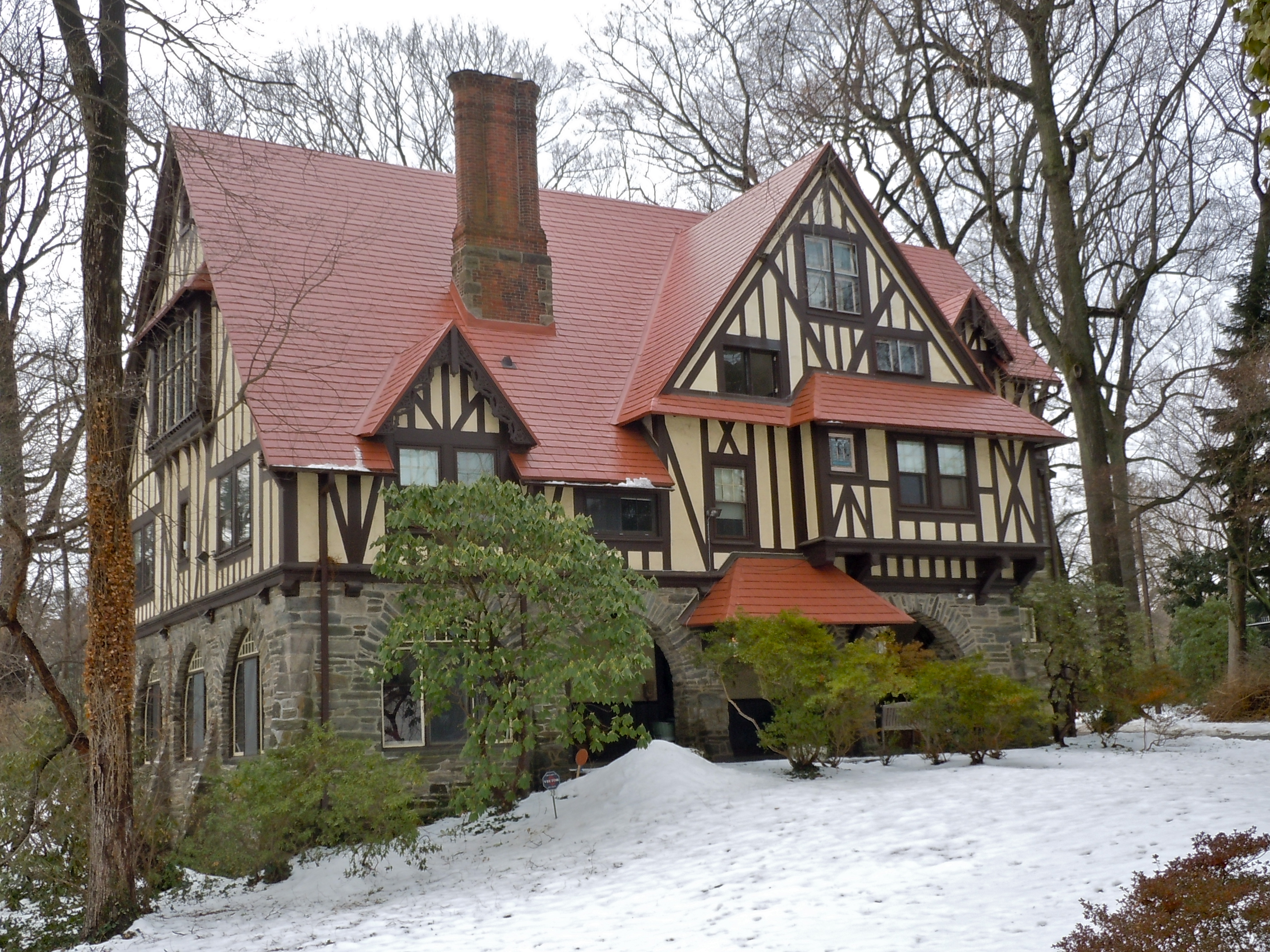
Potok's house in suburban Philadelphia

After four years of study at the Jewish Theological Seminary of America, Potok was ordained as a Conservative rabbi. He was appointed director of the Leaders Training Fellowship (LTF), a youth organization affiliated with Conservative Judaism.

After receiving a master's degree in English literature, Potok enlisted with the U.S. Army as a chaplain. He served in South Korea from 1955 to 1957. He described his time in South Korea as a transformative experience. Brought up to believe that the Jewish people were central to history and God's plans, he experienced life in a region where there were almost no Jews and no antisemitism, yet whose religious believers prayed with the same fervor that he saw in Orthodox synagogues at home.

Upon his return to the U.S., he joined the faculty of the University of Judaism in Los Angeles. Potok met Adena Sara Mosevitzsky, a psychiatric social worker, at Camp Ramah in Ojai, California, where he served as camp director from 1957 to 1959. They were married on June 8, 1958. In 1959, he began his graduate studies at the University of Pennsylvania and was appointed scholar-in-residence at Har Zion Temple in Philadelphia. In 1963, the Potoks were instructors at Camp Ramah in Nyack. Also in 1963, he began a year in Israel, where he wrote his doctoral dissertation on Solomon Maimon and began to write a novel.

In 1964 the Potoks moved to Brooklyn, where Chaim became the managing editor of the magazine Conservative Judaism and joined the faculty of the Teachers' Institute of the Jewish Theological Seminary. The following year, he was appointed editor-in-chief of the Jewish Publication Society in Philadelphia and later, chairman of the publication committee. During this time, Potok received a doctorate in philosophy from the University of Pennsylvania. In 1970, the Potoks relocated to Jerusalem and then returned to Philadelphia in 1977.

In 1976 Potok was a member of the pro-Israel group Writers and Artists for Peace in the Middle East.

After the publication of Old Men at Midnight (2001), Potok was diagnosed with brain cancer. He died at his home in Merion, Pennsylvania on July 23, 2002, aged 73.

== Literary career ==
In 1967 Potok published The Chosen, which won the Edward Lewis Wallant Award and was nominated for the National Book Award. Potok wrote a sequel to The Chosen in 1969, entitled The Promise, which details issues of value and identity between Orthodox and Hasidic Jews, and Reconstructionist Jews who see themselves as following the spirit but not the letter of traditional Judaism. This book won the Athenaeum Literary Award the same year of its publication. Not long afterward the Jewish Publication Society appointed Potok as its special projects editor. In 1972, he published My Name is Asher Lev, the story of a boy struggling with his relationship with his parents, religion and his desire to be an artist. In 1974, the Jewish Publication Society appointed Potok as its special projects editor, a position he held for the rest of his life. In 1975, he published In the Beginning. During this time, Potok began translating the Hebrew Bible into English. In 1978, he published his non-fiction work, Wanderings: Chaim Potok's History of the Jews, a historical account of the Jewish people. Between 1978 and 1989, Potok contributed articles to Moment Magazine. Potok described his 1981 novel The Book of Lights as based on his experiences as a chaplain in Korea during the war. He said his time there "reshaped the neat, coherent model of myself and my place in the world."

His novel The Chosen was made into a film released in 1981, which won the most prestigious award at the World Film Festival, Montreal. Potok had a cameo role as a professor. The film featured Rod Steiger, Barry Miller, Maximilian Schell and Robby Benson. It also became an Off-Broadway musical and was adapted as a stage play by Aaron Posner in collaboration with Potok, which premiered at the Arden Theatre Company in Philadelphia in 1999.

Potok's 1985 book Davita's Harp is his only novel featuring a female protagonist; Davita returned in his Old Men at Midnight (2001). In 1990, he published a sequel to My Name is Asher Lev titled The Gift of Asher Lev. It won the National Jewish Book Award for Fiction. Potok wrote many plays, among them Sins of the Father and Out of the Depths. In 1992, Potok completed another novel, I Am the Clay, about the courageous struggle of a war-ravaged Korean family. His 1993 illustrated children's book The Tree of Here was followed by The Sky of Now (1995), both illustrated by Tony Auth, and a short story collection for young adults, Zebra and Other Stories (1998).

== Literary influences ==
Potok's parents discouraged his writing and reading of non-Jewish subjects. Nevertheless, he spent many hours in the public library reading secular novels. Potok cited James Joyce, Thomas Mann, Fyodor Dostoyevsky, Ernest Hemingway, and S. Y. Agnon as his chief literary influences. Many of his novels are set in the urban environments of the Bronx and Brooklyn where he had lived. While not Hasidic, Potok was raised in an Orthodox home. In the book My Name is Asher Lev, Asher Lev wants to be a painter, which causes much conflict with his father who wants him to do something else, much as Potok did during his childhood. Asher decides to become a painter, which upsets his family. Potok went into writing and painted in his free time. Potok said he related to Asher Lev more than any of his other characters.

== Legacy ==
Potok has had a considerable influence on Jewish American authors. His work was significant for discussing the conflict between traditional Jewish thought and culture and modernity. He taught a highly regarded graduate seminar on Postmodernism at the University of Pennsylvania from 1993 through 2001.

He bequeathed his papers to the University of Pennsylvania. The university houses a collection of Potok correspondence, writings, lectures, sermons, article clippings, memorabilia and fan mail. One of his admirers was Elie Wiesel, who wrote to Potok saying he had read all his books "with fervor and friendship".

== Published works ==
- Jewish Ethics (1964–69, 14 volumes)
- The Chosen (1967)
- The Promise (1969)
- My Name Is Asher Lev (1972)
- In the Beginning (1975)
- The Jew Confronts Himself in American Literature (1975)
- Wanderings: Chaim Potok's History of the Jews (1978)
- The Book of Lights (1981)
- Davita's Harp (1985)
- Theo Tobiasse (1986)
- The Gift of Asher Lev (1990)
- I Am the Clay (1992)
- The Tree of Here (1993)
- The Trope Teacher (1994)
- The Sky of Now (1994)
- The Gates of November (1996)
- Zebra and Other Stories (1998)
- Isaac Stern: My First 79 Years (with Isaac Stern; 1999)
- Old Men at Midnight (2001)
- Walden, Daniel, ed. (2001), Conversations with Chaim Potok

== See also ==
- List of brain tumor patients
