= The Chosen (Potok novel) =

1967 novel by Chaim Potok

- First edition cover
- Author: Chaim Potok
- Language: English
- Genre: Novel
- Publisher: Simon & Schuster
- Publication date: 1967
- Publication place: United States
- Media type: Print (hardback & paperback)
- Pages: 283 pp (first edition, hardback)
- ISBN: 0-671-13674-7 (first edition, hardback)
- Followed by: The Promise

The Chosen is a novel written by Chaim Potok. It was first published in 1967. It follows the narrator, Reuven Malter, and his friend Daniel Saunders, as they grow up in the Williamsburg neighborhood in Brooklyn, New York, in the 1940s. A sequel featuring Reuven's young adult years, The Promise, was published in 1969.

== Plot ==
In 1944 Brooklyn, fifteen-year-old Reuven Malter prepares to play a baseball game: his own Modern Orthodox school against a team from a Hasidic yeshiva. It becomes apparent that Danny Saunders, the son of Rebbe Reb Saunders, is the only good player on the opposing team. The game becomes a war between the two teams, seemingly symbolic of their differing ideologies. In the last inning, with Reuven's team in the lead, Reuven is put in as a pitcher. When Danny gets up to the plate, he hits a line drive straight at Reuven's head, which breaks his glasses and drives a small piece of glass into his eye. Reuven's team loses, and Reuven is rushed to the hospital.

Danny comes to the hospital to apologize, but Reuven is still livid at Danny and rejects his attempts, which angers Reuven's father, who reminds Reuven it is vital to listen to someone who asks to be heard. When Danny returns the next day, Reuven forgives him and they quickly become friends.

Reuven learns that Danny possesses a photographic memory, enabling him to study an astonishing amount of Talmud per day, a goal set by his father, yet still leaving him time to pursue other subjects. Danny tells Reuven that he goes to the library to read books on science and literature, and that a man at the library has been recommending books for him to read. Danny knows he is expected to someday take over his father's position as the rebbe for his community, but wishes he did not have to and that he could pursue psychology instead. Reuven learns that his father, a teacher of Talmud, is the man who has been recommending books to Danny at the library; his father would like him to pursue academia rather than the rabbinate.

When Reuven is released from the hospital, his father discusses the history of Hasidic philosophy. He then explains that only once in a generation is a mind like Danny's born, that Danny cannot help his need for knowledge, and that Danny is also a lonely boy who needs a friend.

The next day, Reuven goes to Danny's family synagogue, where he witnesses a discussion between Danny and his father spanning the entire Talmud. After Shabbat has ended, Danny reveals to Reuven that his father only speaks to him when they study Talmud together. The two boys also discover they will attend the same university, much to Reuven's delight. That Sunday, Danny and Reuven meet at the library, where Danny reveals his fascination with the human mind and his desire to study the works of Sigmund Freud, for which he is teaching himself German.

Reuven goes to the Saunders' house again the next week to study Talmud with Danny and his father. When Danny leaves the room to prepare tea, Rebbe Saunders reveals to Reuven that he knows about Danny's visits to the library and wants to know what Danny is reading. He adds that he knows he cannot prevent Danny from pursuing knowledge, but fears his son will lose faith. Reuven immediately tells Danny about the talk, and later, Reuven's father discerns that Reb Saunders used his conversation with Reuven to communicate with Danny indirectly.

The coming year is dominated by the Allied victory in World War II as well as the death of Franklin Roosevelt, which brings grief to the Malters. In addition, news of the Holocaust reaches American soil, which sends all the characters, especially Rabbi Saunders, into a state of depression. During the summer of that year, Reuven's father suffers a heart attack, and Reuven goes to stay in the Saunders' home. At one meal, Reuven mentions that some feel it is time to establish a Jewish state, which sends Rebbe Saunders into a fierce tirade against Zionism. For the ultra-orthodox, a secular Jewish state established without the coming of the Messiah is against God's will.

Danny and Reuven enter the Yeshiva Rabbi Samson Raphael Hirsch the following year. Danny is miserable because the psychology department at the university is only experimental psychology, not analytical. Danny's psychology professor tells him he should enter clinical psychology.

Later in the year, Reuven's father gives a speech at a Zionist rally that is covered by the Orthodox press, and leads Rebbe Saunders to forbid Danny to have any contact with Reuven. Reuven does not cope well without his best friend, and his grades begin to suffer. Soon afterward, Reuven's father has a second heart attack followed by a lengthy hospitalization. Reuven copes with his father's absence by studying Talmud more intensely, eventually mastering a highly complex section of the Talmud.

After two years, just as the violence in Mandatory Palestine turns into the 1948 Arab–Israeli War and Reuven's father has recovered from his heart attack, Danny is allowed to resume his friendship with Reuven because the state of Israel is now fact, and thus no longer a point of dissension.

As the years pass, Danny's father remains silent with Danny. Danny reveals to Reuven that he will not take his father's place. Instead, he will apply to graduate school and pursue a doctorate in clinical psychology, and his younger brother, Levi, will assume the tzadikate. Danny applies to Harvard, Columbia, and UC Berkeley. He is accepted into all three universities, but he cannot understand why his father will not speak about it, because the acceptance letters came by mail, and he must have seen them.

On the first day of Passover in Danny and Reuven's senior year of college, Reb Saunders invites Reuven to their home to talk with him and Danny. Reb Saunders tells Reuven that he knows Danny will not be assuming the rabbinate, which he has known for a long time, and he accepts this. He then explains why he raised Danny in silence: he feared that Danny's phenomenal intelligence would lead him to lack compassion for others. Therefore, he raised Danny in silence so that he could learn what it is to suffer, and therefore have a soul. He also relates Danny to his older brother, who ran away from his homeland in Russia, became a secular professor and was murdered in Auschwitz concentration camp.

Reb Saunders expresses his gratitude to Reuven and his father for helping Danny when he was ready to rebel, to help Danny remain a part of the Orthodox Jewish tradition, even if he cannot assume the rabbi role. To his father's questions, Danny indicates that he will remove some of the visible indicators of Hasidism (his full beard and payot), but will remain an observer of the mitzvot. Reb Saunders says Passover is the holiday of freedom and that he must let Danny be free.

That September, on his way to graduate school at Columbia, Danny comes for a brief visit without his beard and earlocks. He says that he and his father now talk.

== Main characters ==
Reuven (Robert or Bobby) Malter: a Modern Orthodox Jew, and a teenage boy. He is smart, popular in his community, and has a head for mathematics and logic. His father wants him to be a mathematician when he grows up, but he desires to become a rabbi.

Daniel (Danny) Saunders: a Hasidic Jew, who is also a teenager. Brilliant with a photographic memory, he is interested in psychology (particularly Freudian psychoanalysis) but is lacking in aptitude for mathematics. He wants to become a psychologist, but he feels trapped by the Hasidic tradition which forces him into the role as next in line to succeed his father as Rabbi and tzaddik. This fact is a prominent personal conflict for Danny throughout the book.

David Malter (Reuven's father): a Talmudic scholar, writer, schoolteacher at his son's yeshiva, motivational speaker on acts of Zionism and a Zionist himself. He is considered a heretic by the Hasidim. David supports the creation of the state of Israel because of his belief in the Messianic Age, rather than a literal Messiah.

Rabbi Isaac Saunders (Reb Saunders): Rabbinic sage and tzaddik. He is Danny's father. Rabbi (spiritual leader/teacher) of a Hasidic group, whose role is dynastic (passed on from father to son). He moved his congregation from Russia to the United States before the October Revolution. He is against a secular Jewish nation-state because he believes this supersedes God's will. He is also against all who identify as Zionists and follow the belief of a Messianic Age and wish for a secular Jewish nation-state.

== Literary themes ==
Literary themes within the book include widespread references to senses (especially sight), the pursuit of truth in a gray world, the strength of friendship, and the importance of father-son bonds. Many themes common to Potok's works prevail such as weak women and children, strong father figures, intellectual characters, and the strength and validity of faith in a modern secular world. Potok accentuates the importance of silence, and its role as a medium of communication. Throughout the book, there are numerous instances where Danny and Reuven both receive and process information in a non-verbal form. Potok explicitly introduces this topic by alluding to the relationship between Danny and his father, where there is no verbal communication between them, except during religious study. The two-year-long silence between Danny and Reuven, imposed by Reb Saunders, is also rich in communicative interactions between the two friends; however, it effectively shows the constraints that silence can impose between individuals.

Another important theme is the contrast of tradition to modernity. Reb Saunders insulates and isolates himself from the modern world, including Modern Orthodoxy, in everything from the method used to study Talmud to the creation of the state of Israel. This struggle between holding on to the traditions of one's culture in an ever-changing world and taking on the culture of the adopted home country was also faced by Danny and Reuven, both of whom were raised in a different environment from their parents and have found themselves in such a situation. It reflects the struggle that many immigrants and their children experience after arriving in America.

== Film, TV or theatrical adaptations ==
The Chosen was made into a movie in 1981, and a short-lived off-Broadway musical was produced in 1988. It closed after a week of performances. The book was adapted into a stage play by Potok and Aaron Posner and premiered at the Arden Theater in 1999. Potok wrote a sequel titled The Promise.

== Release information ==
- 1967, USA, Simon & Schuster (ISBN 0-671-13674-7), pub date 28 April 1967, hardback (first edition)
- 1967, UK, Heinemann (ISBN 0-434-59600-0), pub date 1 January 1967, hardback
