= 2020 in British music =

This is a summary of the year 2020 in British music.

== Events ==
- 9 January – Singer Celeste is named as the Sound of 2020, after an annual BBC poll of music critics and industry figures.
- 13 January – Opera Holland Park announces simultaneously the scheduled retirement of Michael Volpe as its general director on 30 September 2020, and the appointment of James Clutton as the company's new Chief Executive and Director of Opera, effective 1 October 2020.
- 24 January – The London Philharmonic Orchestra announces simultaneously the scheduled retirement of Timothy Walker as its chief executive and artistic director, effective 3 June 2020, and the appointment of David Burke as its next chief executive, along with a planned division into separate roles each of the posts of chief executive and of artistic director.
- 1 February
  - The Orchestre National de Lille performs the final concert of its UK tour at Leeds Town Hall, the last European orchestra to perform in the United Kingdom just prior to and after the UK's departure from the European Union.
  - Veteran glam rock band Slade sack their drummer Don Powell after 50 years together; Powell says he will set up a rival group called "Don Powell's Slade".
- 12 February – The Two Moors Festival announces the appointment of Tamsin Waley-Cohen as its new artistic director for its 2020 festival.
- 24 February – The Hallé announces Delyana Lazarova as the winner of the inaugural Siemens Hallé International Conductors Competition 2020.
- 27 February
  - "My Last Breath", sung by James Newman, is selected as the UK's entry for the Eurovision Song Contest 2020. A few weeks later, the contest is cancelled because of the COVID-19 pandemic.
  - The Hallé announces the appointment of David Butcher as its next chief executive, effective September 2020.
  - The Britten Sinfonia announces that David Butcher is to stand down as its chief executive and artistic director in the summer of 2020.
- 11 March
  - The Philharmonia Orchestra announces the appointment of Alexander Van Ingen as its next chief executive, effective September 2020.
  - The Academy of Ancient Music announces that Alexander Van Ingen is to stand down as its chief executive, effective September 2020.
- 17 March – The following classical music organisations announce suspension of performances in the wake of the COVID-19 pandemic:
  - All BBC Orchestras and Choirs
  - Bournemouth Symphony Orchestra
  - Southbank Centre, encompassing the London Philharmonic Orchestra and the Philharmonia Orchestra
  - London Symphony Orchestra
  - Royal Liverpool Philharmonic Orchestra, through 19 April 2020
- 18 March – The Glastonbury Festival announces the cancellation of its 2020 season, in the wake of the COVID-19 pandemic.
- 23 March – Hazard Chase announces cessation of activity and entry into voluntary liquidation, in the wake of the COVID-19 pandemic.
- 24 March – The St Magnus International Festival announces cancellation of its 2020 season, in the wake of the COVID-19 pandemic.
- 26 March – The following festivals have cancelled their scheduled 2020 seasons in the wake of the COVID-19 pandemic:
  - Download Festival
  - East Neuk Festival
  - Isle of Wight Festival
- 27 March – The following festivals have cancelled their scheduled 2020 seasons in the wake of the COVID-19 pandemic:
  - All Points East
  - C2C: Country to Country
  - Lovebox Festival
  - Parklife
  - Cambridge Folk Festival
- 30 March
  - The Aldeburgh Festival announces the cancellation of its 2020 festival season, in the wake of the COVID-19 pandemic, the first-ever festival cancellation in the festival's history.
  - Following a cold and self-isolation, Marianne Faithfull checks into hospital, and subsequently has tested positive for SARS-CoV-2.
- 1 April – The Edinburgh International Festival announces the cancellation of its 2020 festival season, in the wake of the COVID-19 pandemic.
- 2 April – The Dartington Music Summer School and Festival announces the cancellation of its 2020 summer school and festival season, in the wake of the COVID-19 pandemic.
- 6 April – The London Philharmonic Orchestra announces the appointment of Karina Canellakis as its new principal guest conductor, the first female conductor ever named to the post, effective September 2020.
- 24 April – At 99 years old, Captain Tom Moore became the oldest person to top the UK Singles Chart.
- 5 May – Glyndebourne Opera announces cancellation of its 2020 summer season, in the wake of the COVID-19 pandemic.
- 6 May – Britten Sinfonia announces the appointment of Meurig Bowen as its next chief executive and artistic director, effective August 2020.
- 7 May – Help Musicians UK announces the appointment of Dame Evelyn Glennie as its new president.
- 12 May – Wigmore Hall and BBC Radio 3 announce a scheduled series of live concerts from Wigmore Hall, beginning on 1 June, to be performed to an empty hall and under social distancing guidelines, the first live concerts from the hall and broadcast on Radio 3 since the general COVID-19 lockdown.
- 1 June – At Wigmore Hall, Stephen Hough gives a live concert without an audience in attendance, video-streamed and broadcast on BBC Radio 3, the first live classical music concert in London and the first live music relay on BBC Radio 3 in 11 weeks since the imposition of COVID-19-related lockdown conditions.
- 9 June – The Royal Liverpool Philharmonic Orchestra announces the appointment of Domingo Hindoyan as its next chief conductor, effective with the 2021–2022 season.
- 15 June – Birmingham Opera Company announces the appointment of Alpesh Chauhan as its new music director, effective 1 July 2020.
- 16 June – Universal Music Group announces the re-branding of its Virgin EMI label as EMI Records, and the appointment of Rebecca Allen as president of the EMI Records label.
- 25 June – The London Philharmonic Orchestra announces the appointment of Cristina Rocca as its new artistic director, effective November 2020.
- 2 July – Opera North announces postponement of its originally scheduled autumn 2020 and winter 2021 productions, in the wake of the COVID-19 pandemic.
- 3 July – The BBC Proms announces its reconfigured 2020 Proms season, with 6 weeks of archival Proms and selected new digital content, and the final 2 weeks of the season scheduled to feature live concerts under social distancing guidelines at the Royal Albert Hall.
- 4 July – The Bamberg Symphony announces the prize winners of its 2020 Mahler Competition for conductors, which include Finnegan Downie Dear (First Prize) and Harry Ogg (joint winner of Third Prize).
- 6 July – Tom Meighan and Kasabian announce his departure from the group, by mutual agreement. Subsequent reports the next day indicate that the departure was related to Meighan's assault of his former fiancée, Vikki Ager, behaviour condemned by his former bandmates as "totally unacceptable".
- 8 July – Cadogan Hall presents a live concert by the English Chamber Orchestra (ECO) under social distancing guidelines, the first live concert at Cadogan Hall and the first live ECO performance since the imposition of lockdown conditions in the wake of the COVID-19 pandemic.
- 25 July – Grime artist Wiley is dropped by his management after the rapper posted a series of anti-Semitic tweets.
- 28 July – Q magazine folds, and publishes its final issue, blaming low circulation and advertising revenue caused by the COVID-19 pandemic.
- 12 August – Glyndebourne Opera stages the first night of its new live production of Jacques Offenbach's Mesdames de la Halle, in English translation under the title In the Market for Love, or Onions are Forever, under social distancing conditions for the musicians and audience, in the wake of the COVID-19 pandemic.
- 17 August – Wigmore Hall announces a schedule for 100 autumn season concerts under social distancing conditions, scheduled for the period of 13 September 2020 to 22 December 2020.
- 28 August
  - Imogen Cooper is announced as the recipient of The Queens Medal for Music 2019.
  - The first live concert of the 2020 BBC Proms takes place at the Royal Albert Hall, featuring the BBC Symphony Orchestra and the BBC Singers conducted by Sakari Oramo, under social distancing conditions for the musicians, without an audience and to an empty hall.
- 29 August – Seorsia Jack announces her departure from Real Like You eight months after their win on The X Factor: The Band, deciding to pursue a solo career.
- 16 September – The Royal Philharmonic Society awards honorary membership to Dame Sarah Connolly, at a live Wigmore Hall recital.
- 6 October – 400 professional classical musicians stage a socially distanced performance protest in support of musicians not covered by the Self-Employment Income Support Scheme (SEISS) grant.
- 9 October – Queen's Birthday Honours List 2020
  - Donald Runnicles is made a Knight Bachelor.
  - Joan Armatrading is made a Commander of the Order of the British Empire.
  - John Mark Ainsley, Sally Beamish, Nicholas Daniel, Cathyrn Graham, Tony Hatch, Jan Latham-Koenig, Jeff Lynne, and Muyiwa Olarewaju are each made an Officer of the Order of the British Empire.
  - Lurine Cato, Yolanda Charles, Karen Gibson, Carrie Grant, Marianna Hay, Jason Iley, Stephen Layton, Mica Paris, Jennifer Pike, and Dizzee Rascal are each made a Member of the Order of the British Empire.
  - Lady Leshurr is awarded the British Empire Medal.
- 21 October – NI Opera announces the appointment of Cameron Menzies as its next artistic director.
- 1 November – The charity single Four Notes – Paul's Tune, based on a piano improvisation by retired music teacher Paul Harvey, is released in a recording with the BBC Philharmonic accompanying the original piano recording, with proceeds from sales divided equally between the Alzheimers Society and Music for Dementia.
- 4 November – The Southbank Centre announces the appointment of Toks Dada as its new head of classical music, effective December 2020.
- 6 November – Sir Cliff Richard becomes the first artist to have albums in the Top 5 UK album charts across eight consecutive decades, each decade from the 1950s (1959) through the 2020s (2020), with the #3 status of Music...The Air That I Breathe this week.
- 18 November – The Academy of Ancient Music announces the appointment of Laurence Cummings as its next music director, effective with the 2021–2022 season.
- 14 December – Jesy Nelson announces her departure from Little Mix after nine years. Perrie Edwards, Leigh-Anne Pinnock and Jade Thirlwall confirm that they will continue as a three-piece group.
- 18 December
  - The Choir of Kings College, Cambridge announces the cancellation of its scheduled live performance of the 2020 Festival of Nine Lessons and Carols. In its place on 24 December, a recording of the music made as an alternative event is to be relayed.
  - Paul McCartney releases his solo album McCartney III.
- 21 December
  - The girl choristers of Ely Cathedral perform the "Hymn for Christmas Day" by Jane Savage, the earliest known Church of England anthem by a female composer, following its re-discovery in the summer of 2020 by Rachel Webber of the University of York.
  - Esa-Pekka Salonen is made an honorary KBE by Queen Elizabeth II, for services to music and to United Kingdom-Finland cultural relations.
- 30 December: 2021 New Years Honours:
  - Jane Glover is made a Dame Commander of the British Empire.
  - Graham Vick is made a Knight Bachelor.
  - Julian Anderson, Barry Douglas, Daniel Harding, and Wasfi Kani are each made a Commander of the Order of the British Empire.
  - Colin Balsam, Natalie Clein, and Wayne Marshall are each made an Officer of the Order of the British Empire.
  - Bradley Creswick, Craig David, John Kirkpatrick, and Duncan McDonald are each made a Member of the Order of the British Empire.

== Television programmes ==
- 1 January – Jools' Annual Hootenanny features Stereophonics, Stormzy, The Selecter, Rick Astley, and others.
- 4 January
  - The Masked Singer, begins on ITV, with contestants including Denise van Outen, Teddy Sheringham and Justin Hawkins.
  - The Voice UK, series 9, begins on ITV, presented by Emma Willis featuring will.i.am, Sir Tom Jones, Meghan Trainor and Olly Murs as coaches.
- 8 January – Got What It Takes? returns for its fifth series, hosted by Anna Maynard. The series is won by 13 year old Georgie Mills.
- 17 January – Stewart Copeland's Adventures in Music features Sting, Bobby McFerrin and Miss Honey Dijon.
- 11 July – The Voice Kids, series 4, begins on ITV, hosted by Emma Willis.
- 26 September – Little Mix The Search, series 1, begins on BBC, judged by girl group Little Mix.

== Classical works ==
- Emma-Ruth Richards – The Sail of a Flame
- Mark-Anthony Turnage – Towards Alba
- Dani Howard – Dualism
- Thomas Hewitt Jones – Divertimento for String Quartet
- Howard Goodall – Never to Forget
- Hannah Kendall – Tuxedo: Vasco 'de' Gama
- Thomas Adès – Dawn
- Mark-Anthony Turnage – Last Song for Olly
- Roxanna Panufnik – Heartfelt
- Geoffrey Gordon – He saith among the trumpets
- John Paul Jones – The Tudor Pull
- Julia Plaut – 24 Pianos
- Ryan Wigglesworth – Five Waltzes

== Opera ==
- Alex Woolf and David Pountney – A Feast in the Time of Plague

== Film scores and incidental music ==
=== Film ===
- Patrick Doyle – Death on the Nile, directed by Kenneth Branagh
- Dickon Hinchliffe – Misbehaviour

=== Television ===
- David Arnold & Michael Price – Dracula
- Stephen Rennicks – Normal People

== British music awards ==
- Brit Awards – see 2020 Brit Awards
- Gramophone Classical Music Awards 2020
  - Chamber: Bartók – Piano Quintet / Veress – String Trio; Vilde Frang; Barnabás Kelemen; Katalin Kokas; Lawrence Power; Nicolas Altstaedt; Alexander Lonquich (Alpha Classics)
  - Choral: J.S. Bach – St Matthew Passion; Benjamin Bruns, Damien Guillon, Christian Immler, Toru Kaku, Clint van der Linde, Aki Matsui, Makoto Sakurada, Carolyn Sampson, Zachary Wilder; Bach Collegium Japan; Masaaki Suzuki, conductor (BIS)
  - Concerto: Chopin – Piano Concertos; Benjamin Grosvenor; Royal Scottish National Orchestra; Elim Chan, conductor (Decca Classics)
  - Contemporary: Thomas Adès – Piano Concerto / Totentanz; Kirill Gerstein, Mark Stone, Christianne Stotijn; Boston Symphony Orchestra; Thomas Adès, conductor (Deutsche Grammophon)
  - Early Music: Gesualdo – Madrigali, Libri primo & secondo; Les Arts Florissants; Paul Agnew (harmonia mundi) (Hyperion)
  - Instrumental: Beethoven – Complete Piano Sonatas; Igor Levit (Sony Classical)
  - Opera: Handel – Agrippina; Joyce DiDonato, Elsa Benoit, Luca Pisaroni, Franco Fagioli, Jakub Józef Orliński, Andrea Mastroni, Carlo Vistoli, Biagio Pizzuti, Marie-Nicole Lemieux; Il Pomo d'Oro; Maxim Emelyanychev, conductor (Erato)
  - Orchestral: Mieczysław Weinberg – Symphonies Nos 2 and 21; Gidon Kremer; Kremerata Baltica; City of Birmingham Symphony Orchestra; Mirga Gražinytė-Tyla, conductor (Deutsche Grammophon)
  - Recital: Si j'ai aimé (Berlioz, Théodore Dubois; Duparc; Massenet; Saint-Saëns; Vierne); Sandrine Piau; Le Concert de la Loge; Julien Chauvin, director (Alpha Classics)
  - Solo Vocal: Janáček – The Diary of One Who Disappeared, Nursery Rhymes, Moravian Folk Poetry in Songs; Nicky Spence; Václava Housková; Victoria Samek; Julius Drake (Hyperion)
  - Recording of the Year: Mieczysław Weinberg – Symphonies Nos 2 and 21; Gidon Kremer; Kremerata Baltica; City of Birmingham Symphony Orchestra; Mirga Gražinytė-Tyla, conductor (Deutsche Grammophon)
  - Concept Album: From the Ground Up: The Chaconne; Hugo Ticciati; o/modernt (Signum Classics)
  - Beethoven 250 Award: Beethoven – Piano Concertos Nos 2 and 5; Martin Helmchen; Deutsches Symphonie-Orchester Berlin; Andrew Manze, conductor (Alpha Classics)
  - Young Artist of the Year: Natalya Romaniw
  - Label of the Year: Alpha Classics
  - Artist of the Year: Igor Levit
  - Orchestra of the Year: The Philadelphia Orchestra
  - Special Achievement: Robert von Bahr
  - Lifetime Achievement: Itzhak Perlman
- 2020 Royal Philharmonic Society Awards
  - RPS Gold Medal: John Williams
  - Chamber-Scale Composition: Naomi Pinnock, I am, I am
  - Concert Series & Events: Venus Unwrapped – Kings Place
  - Conductor: Dalia Stasevska
  - Ensemble: Scottish Ensemble
  - Gamechanger: Jane Glover
  - Impact: Sound Young Minds – City of London Sinfonia
  - Inspiration:
    - Concerteenies
    - Diocese of Leeds Schools Singing Programme
    - Stay At Home Choir
    - The Opera Story's Episodes
    - #UriPosteJukeBox
    - Virtual Benedetti Sessions
  - Instrumentalist: Lawrence Power
  - Large-Scale Composition: Frank Denyer – The Fish that Became the Sun (Songs of the Dispossessed)
  - Opera & Music Theatre: The Turn of the Screw – Garsington Opera
  - Singer: Natalya Romaniw
  - Storytelling: Stephen Hough – Rough Ideas
  - Young Artists: Sheku Kanneh-Mason
- Ivors Composer Awards
  - Chamber Orchestral: Robin Haigh – Grin
  - Choral: Richard Blackford – Pietà
  - Community and Participation: Oliver Vibrans – More Up
  - Innovation – Yazz Ahmed
  - Jazz Composition for Large Ensemble: Charlie Bates – Crepuscule
  - Jazz Composition for Small Ensemble: Renell Shaw – The Vision They Had
  - Large Chamber: Oliver Leith – Honey Siren
  - Large Orchestral: Jonny Greenwood – Horror vacui
  - Outstanding Works Collection: Cecilia McDowell
  - Small Chamber: Daniel Fardon – Six Movements
  - Solo or Duo: Gareth Moorcraft – Diaries of the Early Worm
  - Sound Art: Kathy Hinde – Twittering Machines
  - Stage Works: Philip Venables – Denis & Katya

== Charts and sales ==
=== Number-one singles ===
The singles chart includes a proportion for streaming.

Key
†	Best performing single of the year

Chart date (week ending)	Song	Artist(s)	Chart sales	References
2 January	"River"	Ellie Goulding	78,193	
9 January	"Own It"	Stormzy featuring Ed Sheeran and Burna Boy	56,590	
16 January	"Own It"	Stormzy featuring Ed Sheeran and Burna Boy	55,826	
23 January	"Own It"	Stormzy featuring Ed Sheeran and Burna Boy	55,400	
30 January	"Godzilla"	Eminem featuring Juice Wrld	52,633	
6 February	"Before You Go"	Lewis Capaldi	65,943	
13 February	"Blinding Lights" †	The Weeknd	62,512	
20 February	"Blinding Lights" †	The Weeknd	64,954	
27 February	"No Time to Die"	Billie Eilish	90,488	
5 March	"Blinding Lights" †	The Weeknd	64,302	
12 March	"Blinding Lights" †	The Weeknd	63,966	
19 March	"Blinding Lights" †	The Weeknd	60,545	
26 March	"Roses"	Saint Jhn	52,656	
2 April	"Roses"	Saint Jhn	59,859	
9 April	"Blinding Lights" †	The Weeknd	69,595	
16 April	"Blinding Lights" †	The Weeknd	80,073	
23 April	"Blinding Lights" †	The Weeknd	77,918	
30 April	"You'll Never Walk Alone"	Michael Ball and Captain Tom Moore	81,829	
7 May	"Times Like These"	Live Lounge Allstars	66,164	
14 May	"Toosie Slide"	Drake	49,187	
21 May	"Rockstar"	DaBaby featuring Roddy Ricch	44,879	
28 May	"Rockstar"	DaBaby featuring Roddy Ricch	57,429	
4 June	"Rain on Me"	Lady Gaga and Ariana Grande	70,132	
11 June	"Rockstar"	DaBaby featuring Roddy Ricch	64,382	
18 June	"Rockstar"	DaBaby featuring Roddy Ricch	57,677	
25 June	"Rockstar"	DaBaby featuring Roddy Ricch	59,299	
2 July	"Rockstar"	DaBaby featuring Roddy Ricch	59,563	
9 July	"Savage Love (Laxed – Siren Beat)"	Jawsh 685 and Jason Derulo	57,105	
16 July	"Savage Love (Laxed – Siren Beat)"	Jawsh 685 and Jason Derulo	63,292	
23 July	"Savage Love (Laxed – Siren Beat)"	Jawsh 685 and Jason Derulo	63,411	
30 July	"Head & Heart"	Joel Corry featuring MNEK	67,806	
6 August	"Head & Heart"	Joel Corry featuring MNEK	76,363	
13 August	"Head & Heart"	Joel Corry featuring MNEK	79,313	
20 August	"Head & Heart"	Joel Corry featuring MNEK	81,254	
27 August	"Head & Heart"	Joel Corry featuring MNEK	67,888	
3 September	"Head & Heart"	Joel Corry featuring MNEK	61,845	
10 September	"WAP"	Cardi B featuring Megan Thee Stallion	64,725	
17 September	"WAP"	Cardi B featuring Megan Thee Stallion	62,118	
24 September	"WAP"	Cardi B featuring Megan Thee Stallion	59,563	
1 October	"Mood"	24kGoldn featuring Iann Dior	60,618	
8 October	"Mood"	24kGoldn featuring Iann Dior	54,844	
15 October	"Mood"	24kGoldn featuring Iann Dior	50,366	
22 October	"Mood"	24kGoldn featuring Iann Dior	48,886	
29 October	"Lemonade"	Internet Money and Gunna featuring Don Toliver and Nav	38,052	
5 November	"Positions"	Ariana Grande	60,909	
12 November	"Positions"	Ariana Grande	50,903	
19 November	"Positions"	Ariana Grande	44,348	
26 November	"Positions"	Ariana Grande	44,581	
3 December	"Positions"	Ariana Grande	42,870	
10 December	"Positions"	Ariana Grande	38,394	
17 December	"All I Want for Christmas Is You"	Mariah Carey	44,016	
24 December	"All I Want for Christmas Is You"	Mariah Carey	43,944	
31 December	"Don't Stop Me Eatin'"	LadBaby	158,000	

=== List of Number-one downloads ===
Chart date (week ending)	Song	Artist(s)
2 January	"Dance Monkey"	Tones & I
9 January	"Before You Go"	Lewis Capaldi
16 January	"Dance Monkey"	Tones & I
23 January	"Blinding Lights"	The Weeknd
30 January	"Blinding Lights"	The Weeknd
4 February	"Ode to Joy"	André Rieu
11 February	"Blinding Lights"	The Weeknd
18 February	"Blinding Lights"	The Weeknd
25 February	"No Time to Die"	Billie Eilish
5 March	"On"	BTS
12 March	"Stupid Love"	Lady Gaga
19 March	"Blinding Lights"	The Weeknd
26 March	"Blinding Lights"	The Weeknd
2 April	"Blinding Lights"	The Weeknd
9 April	"Blinding Lights"	The Weeknd
16 April	"Thank You Baked Potato"	Matt Lucas
23 April	"Blinding Lights"	The Weeknd
30 April	"You'll Never Walk Alone"	Michael Ball and Captain Tom Moore
7 May	"Times Like These"	Live Lounge Allstars
14 May	"Times Like These"	Live Lounge Allstars
21 May	"Blinding Lights"	The Weeknd
28 May	"Blinding Lights"	The Weeknd
4 June	"Rain on Me"	Lady Gaga and Ariana Grande
11 June	"Rain on Me"	Lady Gaga and Ariana Grande
18 June	"Rain on Me"	Lady Gaga and Ariana Grande
25 June	"Rain on Me"	Lady Gaga and Ariana Grande
2 July	"Savage Love (Laxed – Siren Beat)"	Jawsh 685 and Jason Derulo
9 July	"Savage Love (Laxed – Siren Beat)"	Jawsh 685 and Jason Derulo
16 July	"Savage Love (Laxed – Siren Beat)"	Jawsh 685 and Jason Derulo
23 July	"Savage Love (Laxed – Siren Beat)"	Jawsh 685 and Jason Derulo
30 July	"Head & Heart"	Joel Corry featuring MNEK
6 August	"Lighter"	Nathan Dawe
13 August	"Head & Heart"	Joel Corry featuring MNEK
20 August	"Head & Heart"	Joel Corry featuring MNEK
27 August	"Head & Heart"	Joel Corry featuring MNEK
3 September	"Dynamite"	BTS
10 September	"Dynamite"	BTS
17 September	"Midnight Sky"	Miley Cyrus
24 September	"Midnight Sky"	Miley Cyrus
1 October	"Lasting Lover"	Sigala and James Arthur
8 October	"Spirit of the Blues"	Everton F.C.
15 October	"Midnight Sky"	Miley Cyrus
22 October	"Midnight Sky"	Miley Cyrus
29 October	"Head & Heart"	Joel Corry featuring MNEK
5 November	"Really Love"	KSI featuring Craig David and Digital Farm Animals
12 November	"Four Notes – Paul's Tune"	Paul Harvey and BBC Philharmonic
19 November	"Four Notes – Paul's Tune"	Paul Harvey and BBC Philharmonic
26 November	"Stop Crying Your Heart Out"	BBC Radio 2 Allstars
3 December	"Life Goes On"	BTS
10 December	"All You're Dreaming Of"	Liam Gallagher
17 December	"Live It Up"	Mental As Anything
24 December	"Keeping the Dream Alive"	Rock Choir, Vocal Group and Caroline Redman Lusher
31 December	"Don't Stop Me Eatin'"	LadBaby

=== Number-one albums ===
The albums chart includes a proportion for streaming.

Key
†	Best performing album of the year

Chart date (week ending)	Album	Artist(s)	Chart sales	References
2 January	You're in My Heart	Rod Stewart	47,495	
9 January	Divinely Uninspired to a Hellish Extent†	Lewis Capaldi	21,203	
16 January	Heavy Is the Head	Stormzy	23,614	
23 January	Divinely Uninspired to a Hellish Extent†	Lewis Capaldi	18,298	
30 January	Music to Be Murdered By	Eminem	36,302	
6 February	Big Conspiracy	J Hus	23,536	
13 February	Foolish Loving Spaces	Blossoms	22,489	
20 February	Father of All...	Green Day	23,389	
27 February	Changes	Justin Bieber	17,681	
5 March	Map of the Soul: 7	BTS	37,978	
12 March	Divinely Uninspired to a Hellish Extent†	Lewis Capaldi	14,706	
19 March	Manchester Calling	Paul Heaton and Jacqui Abbott	20,422	
26 March	Heartbreak Weather	Niall Horan	14,300	
2 April	After Hours	The Weeknd	25,677	
9 April	Calm	5 Seconds of Summer	34,941	
16 April	Future Nostalgia	Dua Lipa	16,080	
23 April	Future Nostalgia	Dua Lipa	11,833	
30 April	The Bonny	Gerry Cinnamon	28,945	
7 May	Future Nostalgia	Dua Lipa	10,532	
14 May	Dark Lane Demo Tapes	Drake	19,851	
21 May	Future Nostalgia	Dua Lipa	7,317	
28 May	Divinely Uninspired to a Hellish Extent†	Lewis Capaldi	8,396	
4 June	Notes on a Conditional Form	The 1975	34,245	
11 June	Chromatica	Lady Gaga	52,907	
18 June	Chromatica	Lady Gaga	12,819	
25 June	MTV Unplugged	Liam Gallagher	20,874	
2 July	Rough and Rowdy Ways	Bob Dylan	34,117	
9 July	Women in Music Pt. III	Haim	17,762	
16 July	On Sunset	Paul Weller	24,011	
23 July	Legends Never Die	Juice Wrld	22,437	
30 July	Brightest Blue	Ellie Goulding	14,820	
6 August	Folklore	Taylor Swift	37,060	
13 August	Folklore	Taylor Swift	22,550	
20 August	Folklore	Taylor Swift	15,539	
27 August	A Celebration of Endings	Biffy Clyro	26,161	
3 September	Imploding the Mirage	The Killers	50,391	
10 September	Crabs in a Bucket	Nines	13,594	
17 September	Goats Head Soup	Rolling Stones	13,107	
24 September	The Universal Want	Doves	17,400	
1 October	Shoot for the Stars, Aim for the Moon	Pop Smoke	9,665	
8 October	Ultra Mono	Idles	27,182	
15 October	Live Around the World	Queen and Adam Lambert	25,275	
22 October	Edna	Headie One	15,494	
29 October	Cherry Blossom	The Vamps	13,476	
5 November	Letter to You	Bruce Springsteen	51,761	
12 November	Positions	Ariana Grande	27,272	
19 November	Disco	Kylie Minogue	54,905	
26 November	Power Up	AC/DC	61,976	
3 December	Together at Christmas	Michael Ball and Alfie Boe	32,822	
10 December	Music Played by Humans	Gary Barlow	46,406	
17 December	Weird!	Yungblud	38,759	
24 December	Evermore	Taylor Swift	27,532	
31 December	McCartney III	Paul McCartney	33,079	

=== Number-one compilation albums ===
Chart date (week ending)	Album	Chart sales	References
2 January	Now 104		
9 January	Now 104		
16 January	Frozen II		
23 January	Frozen II		
30 January	Frozen II		
6 February	Frozen II		
13 February	Frozen II		
20 February	Now 104		
27 February	Frozen II		
5 March	The Greatest Showman		
12 March	The Greatest Showman		
19 March	The Greatest Showman		
26 March	Now 100 Hits Country		
2 April	Frozen II		
9 April	Frozen II		
16 April	Frozen II		
23 April	Frozen II		
30 April	The Greatest Showman		
7 May	The Greatest Showman		
14 May	The Greatest Showman		
21 May	Now 105		
28 May	Now 105		
4 June	Now 105		
11 June	Now 105		
18 June	Now 105		
25 June	Now 105		
2 July	Now 105		
9 July	Now 105		
16 July	Hamilton		
23 July	Hamilton		
30 July	Hamilton		
6 August	Now 106		
13 August	Now 106		
20 August	Now 106		
27 August	Now 106		
3 September	Now 106		
10 September	Now 106		
17 September	Now 106		
24 September	Now 106		
1 October	Now 106		
8 October	Hamilton		
15 October	The Greatest Showman		
22 October	Now 100 Hits 80s No.1s		
29 October	The Greatest Showman		
5 November	The Greatest Showman		
12 November	The Greatest Showman		
19 November	Dreamboats and Petticoats – Music That Lives		
26 November	Dreamboats and Petticoats – Music That Lives		
3 December	Dreamboats and Petticoats – Music That Lives		
10 December	Now 107		
17 December	Now 107		
24 December	Now 107		
31 December	Now 107		

== Year-end charts ==
=== Top singles of the year ===
This chart was published by the Official Charts Company on 4 January 2021

Combined	Title	Artist(s)	Peak position	Combined
1	"Blinding Lights"	The Weeknd	1	
2	"Dance Monkey"	Tones and I	5 (Note: Reached number 1 in 2019)	
3	"Roses"	Saint Jhn	1	
4	"Before You Go"	Lewis Capaldi	1	
5	"Head & Heart"	Joel Corry featuring MNEK	1	
6	"Don't Start Now"	Dua Lipa	3 (Note: Reached number 2 in 2019)	
7	"Rockstar"	DaBaby featuring Roddy Ricch	1	
8	"Someone You Loved"	Lewis Capaldi	6 (Note: Reached number 1 in 2019)	
9	"Own It"	Stormzy featuring Ed Sheeran and Burna Boy	1	
10	"Watermelon Sugar"	Harry Styles	4	
11	"Savage Love (Laxed – Siren Beat)"	Jawsh 685 and Jason Derulo	1	
12	"The Box"	Roddy Ricch	2	
13	"Say So"	Doja Cat	2	
14	"Lonely"	Joel Corry	4	
15	"Breaking Me"	Topic and A7S	3	
16	"Adore You"	Harry Styles	7	
17	"Rain on Me"	Lady Gaga and Ariana Grande	1	
18	"Rover"	S1mba featuring DTG	3	
19	"Physical"	Dua Lipa	3	
20	"Mood"	24kGoldn featuring Iann Dior	1	
21	"Death Bed (Coffee for Your Head)"	Powfu featuring Beabadoobee	4	
22	"Life Is Good"	Future featuring Drake	3	
23	"WAP"	Cardi B featuring Megan Thee Stallion	1	
24	"Bruises"	Lewis Capaldi	12 (Note: Reached number 6 in 2019)	
25	"Toosie Slide"	Drake	1	
26	"Bad Guy"	Billie Eilish	15 (Note: Reached number 2 in 2019)	
27	"Godzilla"	Eminem featuring Juice Wrld	1	
28	"Memories"	Maroon 5	13 (Note: Reached number 5 in 2019)	
29	"Everything I Wanted"	Billie Eilish	6 (Note: Reached number 3 in 2019)	
30	"Intentions"	Justin Bieber featuring Quavo	8	
31	"Roxanne"	Arizona Zervas	4	
32	"Rain"	Aitch and AJ Tracey featuring Tay Keith	3	
33	"Flowers"	Nathan Dawe featuring Jaykae	12	
34	"Falling"	Harry Styles	15	
35	"This City"	Sam Fischer	16	
36	"Savage"	Megan Thee Stallion	3	
37	"Dinner Guest"	AJ Tracey featuring MoStack	5	
38	"Ride It"	Regard	11 (Note: Reached number 2 in 2019)	
39	"Blueberry Faygo"	Lil Mosey	9	
40	"Lighter"	Nathan Dawe featuring KSI	3	
41	"Secrets"	Regard and Raye	6	
42	"I Don't Care"	Ed Sheeran and Justin Bieber	27 (Note: Reached number 1 in 2019)	
43	"Break My Heart"	Dua Lipa	6	
44	"You Should Be Sad"	Halsey	12	
45	"Don't Need Love"	220 Kid and Gracey	9	
46	"Hold Me While You Wait"	Lewis Capaldi	26 (Note: Reached number 4 in 2019)	
47	"If the World Was Ending"	JP Saxe featuring Julia Michaels	14	
48	"Don't Rush"	Young T & Bugsey featuring Headie One	19	
49	"Better Off Without You"	Becky Hill featuring Shift K3Y	14	
50	"Circles"	Post Malone	19 (Note: Reached number 3 in 2019)	

=== Best-selling albums ===
No.	Title	Artist	Peak position	Combined sales
1	Divinely Uninspired to a Hellish Extent	Lewis Capaldi	1	
2	Fine Line	Harry Styles	3 (Note: Reached number 2 in 2021)	
3	Future Nostalgia	Dua Lipa	1	265,000
4	When We All Fall Asleep, Where Do We Go?	Billie Eilish	2 (Note: Reached number 1 in 2019)	
5	Heavy Is the Head	Stormzy	1	
6	Shoot for the Stars, Aim for the Moon	Pop Smoke	1	
7	No.6 Collaborations Project	Ed Sheeran	3 (Note: Reached number 1 in 2019)	
8	Greatest Hits	Queen	7 (Note: Reached number 1 in 1981)	
9	Diamonds	Elton John	7 (Note: Reached number 5 in 2017)	
10	50 Years – Don't Stop	Fleetwood Mac	9 (Note: Reached number 5 in 2019)	
11	Music to Be Murdered By	Eminem	1	
12	Folklore	Taylor Swift	1	
13	÷	Ed Sheeran	11 (Note: Reached number 1 in 2017)	
14	Rumours	Fleetwood Mac	11 (Note: Reached number 1 in 1978)	
15	Hollywood's Bleeding	Post Malone	9 (Note: Reached number 1 in 2019)	
16	High Expectations	Mabel	11 (Note: Reached number 3 in 2019)	
17	Legends Never Die	Juice Wrld	1	
18	Together at Christmas	Michael Ball and Alfie Boe	1	
19	ABBA Gold	ABBA	13 (Note: Reached number 1 in 1992)	
20	Legend	Bob Marley and the Wailers	9 (Note: Reached number 1 in 1984)	
21	(What's the Story) Morning Glory?	Oasis	3 (Note: Reached number 1 in 1995)	
22	Chromatica	Lady Gaga	1	
23	After Hours	The Weeknd	1	
24	Time Flies... 1994–2009	Oasis	15 (Note: Reached number 1 in 2010)	
25	Dua Lipa	Dua Lipa	16 (Note: Reached number 3 in 2018)	
26	Power Up	AC/DC	1	
27	Get to Know	Becky Hill	20	
28	Curtain Call: The Hits	Eminem	24 (Note: Reached number 1 in 2005)	
29	Confetti	Little Mix	2	
30	Don't Smile at Me	Billie Eilish	12	
31	Letter to You	Bruce Springsteen	1	
32	Big Conspiracy	J Hus	1	
33	Disco	Kylie Minogue	1	
34	1	The Beatles	17 (Note: Reached number 1 in 2000)	
35	Legacy	David Bowie	15 (Note: Reached number 5 in 2017)	
36	Snacks/Snacks (Supersize)	Jax Jones	19 (Note: Reached number 9 in 2019)	
37	Lover	Taylor Swift	14 (Note: Reached number 1 in 2019)	
38	What a Time to Be Alive	Tom Walker	8 (Note: Reached number 1 in 2019)	
39	Number Ones	Michael Jackson	30 (Note: Reached number 1 in 2003)	
40	Goodbye & Good Riddance	Juice Wrld	32 (Note: Reached number 23 in 2021)	
41	AM	Arctic Monkeys	34 (Note: Reached number 1 in 2013)	
42	The Ultimate Collection	Whitney Houston	31 (Note: Reached number 3 in 2007)	
43	Staying at Tamara's	George Ezra	27 (Note: Reached number 1 in 2018)	
44	?	XXXTentacion	38 (Note: Reached number 3 in 2018)	
45	The Bonny	Gerry Cinnamon	1	
46	Psychodrama	Dave	13 (Note: Reached number 1 in 2019)	
47	Without Fear	Dermot Kennedy	13 (Note: Reached number 1 in 2019)	
48	Map of the Soul: 7	BTS	1	
49	Music Played by Humans	Gary Barlow	1	
50	Twenty Five	George Michael	33 (Note: Reached number 1 in 2006)	
51	Whatever People Say I Am, That's What I'm Not	Arctic Monkeys	37 (Note: Reached number 1 in 2006)	
52	×	Ed Sheeran	43 (Note: Reached number 1 in 2014)	
53	Imploding the Mirage	The Killers	1	
54	The Platinum Collection: Greatest Hits I, II & III	Queen	24 (Note: Reached number 2 in 2002)	
55	Rare	Selena Gomez	2	
56	Rough and Rowdy Ways	Bob Dylan	1	
57	Christmas	Michael Bublé	4 (Note: Reached number 1 in 2011)	
58	Positions	Ariana Grande	1	
59	Love Goes	Sam Smith	2	
60	Classic Diamonds	Neil Diamond and the London Symphony Orchestra	2	
61	Beerbongs & Bentleys	Post Malone	35 (Note: Reached number 1 in 2018)	
62	Dissimulation	KSI	2	
63	Direct Hits	The Killers	33 (Note: Reached number 5 in 2019)	
64	Scorpion	Drake	39 (Note: Reached number 1 in 2018)	
65	Greatest Hits	Foo Fighters	18 (Note: Reached number 4 in 2009)	
66	Back to Black	Amy Winehouse	39 (Note: Reached number 1 in 2007)	
67	Definitely Maybe	Oasis	35 (Note: Reached number 1 in 1994)	
68	Meet the Woo 2	Pop Smoke	16	
69	Singles	Maroon 5	50 (Note: Reached number 32 in 2021)	
70	In the Lonely Hour	Sam Smith	56 (Note: Reached number 1 in 2014)	
71	The 50 Greatest Hits	Elvis Presley	47 (Note: Reached number 2 in 2017)	
72	Hypersonic Missiles	Sam Fender	20 (Note: Reached number 1 in 2019)	
73	Greatest Hits	Red Hot Chili Peppers	49 (Note: Reached number 4 in 2003)	
74	Thank U, Next	Ariana Grande	37 (Note: Reached number 1 in 2019)	
75	Dark Lane Demo Tapes	Drake	1	
76	The Definitive Collection	Stevie Wonder	37 (Note: Reached number 11 in 2008)	
77	Erratic Cinematic	Gerry Cinnamon	36 (Note: Reached number 17 in 2019)	
78	Jolly Holiday	Andre Rieu and the Johann Strauss Orchestra	4	
79	Music... The Air That I Breathe	Cliff Richard	3	
80	Believe	Andrea Bocelli	3	
81	Always in Between	Jess Glynne	52 (Note: Reached number 1 in 2018)	
82	Platinum Hits	Jason Derulo	46	
83	Please Excuse Me for Being Antisocial	Roddy Ricch	13	
84	Greatest Hits	Guns N' Roses	17 (Note: Reached number 1 in 2004)	
85	Greatest Hits: God's Favorite Band	Green Day	69 (Note: Reached number 22 in 2017)	
86	Astroworld	Travis Scott	16 (Note: Reached number 3 in 2018)	
87	Changes	Justin Bieber	1	
88	I Cry When I Laugh	Jess Glynne	59 (Note: Reached number 1 in 2015)	
89	Harry Styles	Harry Styles	53 (Note: Reached number 1 in 2017)	
90	PTSD	D-Block Europe	27 (Note: Reached number 4 in 2019)	
91	Death Race for Love	Juice Wrld	70 (Note: Reached number 12 in 2019)	
92	Kiwanuka	Michael Kiwanuka	4 (Note: Reached number 2 in 2019)	
93	The Singles	Phil Collins	48 (Note: Reached number 2 in 2006)	
94	25	Adele	48 (Note: Reached number 1 in 2015)	
95	Huncholini the 1st	M Huncho	5	
96	Hot Pink	Doja Cat	38	

== Bands formed ==
- Kaachi
- Since September

== Bands reformed ==
- Genesis
- JLS (first reported in 2019, confirmed in 2020)
- Little Man Tate
- The Music

== Bands disbanded ==
- Lower Than Atlantis
- The Montgolfier Brothers
- Nizlopi
- The Spencer Davis Group

== Deaths ==
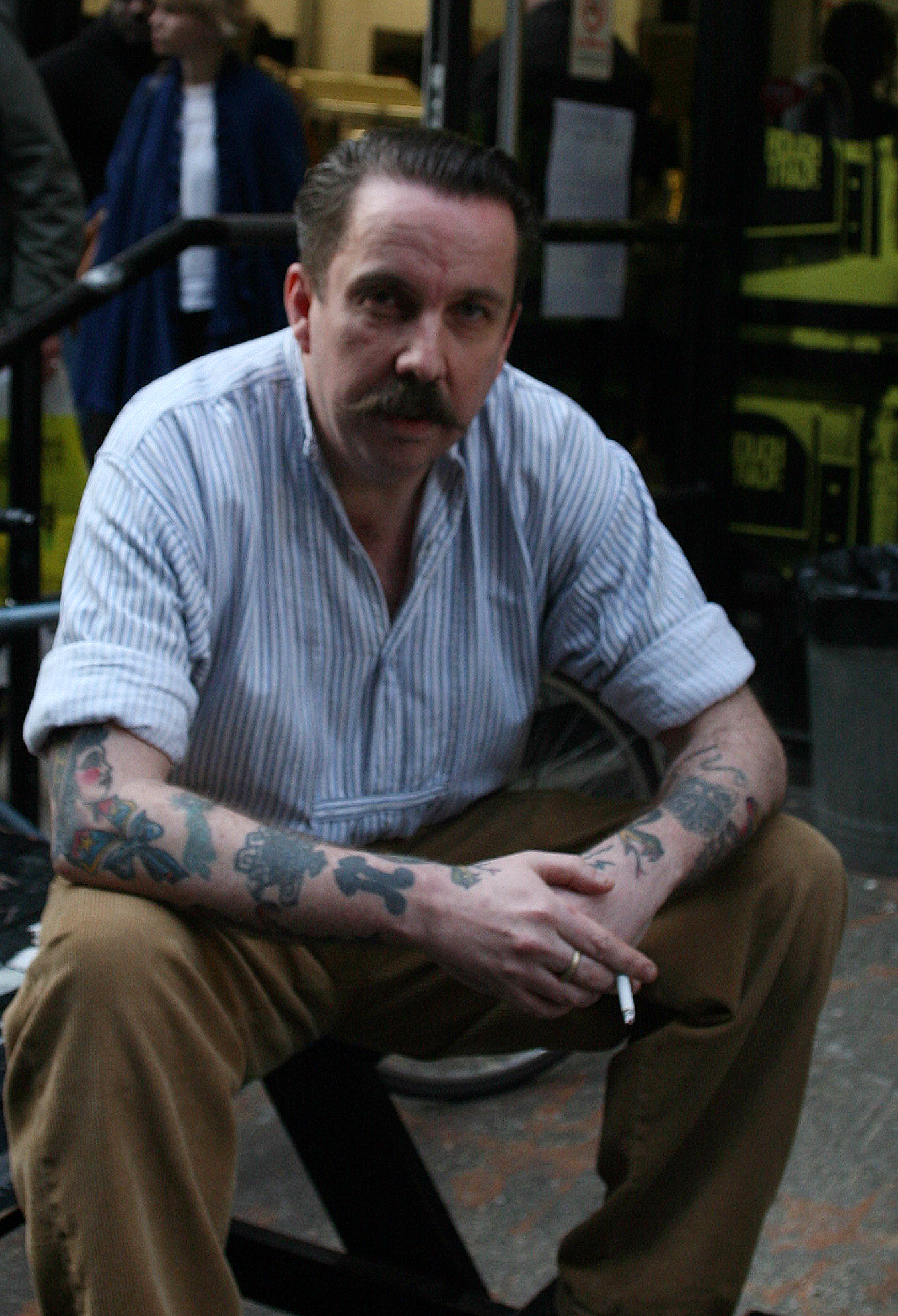
Andrew Weatherall in 2009

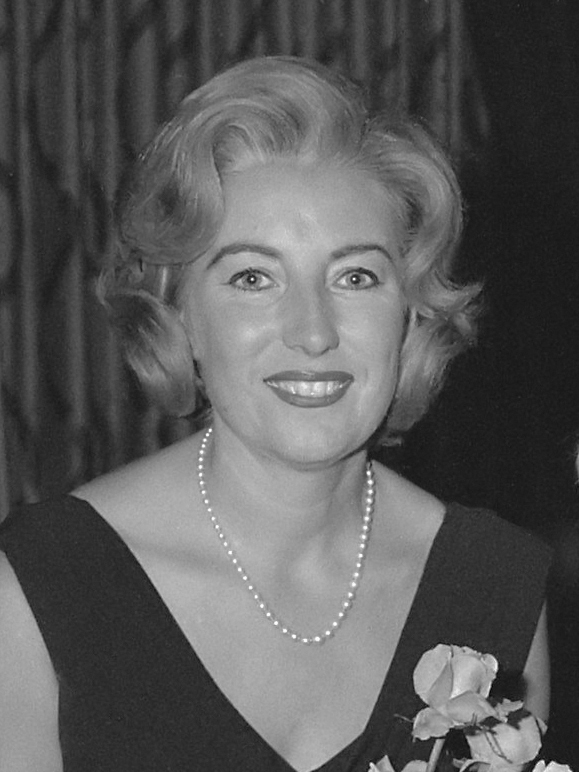
Dame Vera Lynn in 1962

- 7 January – Stephen Clements, radio DJ and presenter (BBC Radio Ulster), 47
- 13 January – Hylda Sims, poet and folk musician, 87
- 16 January – Barry Tuckwell, Australia-born French horn player, conductor, and past principal French horn of the London Symphony Orchestra, 86
- 3 February – Eric Parkin, classical pianist, 95
- 1 February – Andy Gill, post-punk guitarist (Gang of Four) and record producer, 64
- 12 February – Hamish Milne, classical pianist, 80
- 16 February – Pearl Carr, singer (Pearl Carr & Teddy Johnson), 99
- 17 February – Andrew Weatherall, music producer (Screamadelica), disc jockey and musician (The Sabres of Paradise, Two Lone Swordsmen), 56 (pulmonary embolism)
- 12 March – Pete Mitchell, 61, English radio DJ and presenter (BBC Radio 2, Virgin Radio).
- 14 March – Genesis P-Orridge, singer, musician, poet, performance artist (Throbbing Gristle), (Psychic TV), 70 (leukemia)
- 18 March – Sir John Tooley, arts administrator, 95
- 22 March – Julie Felix, American-born folk singer, 81
- 24 March – Gerard Schurmann, Dutch composer resident in the UK, 96
- 25 March – Jennifer Bate, classical organist, 75
- 27 March – Delroy Washington, Jamaican-born reggae singer, 67 (COVID-19)
- 6 April – Black the Ripper, grime MC, rapper and cannabis activist 32
- 8 April – Eileen Croxford Parkhouse, cellist, pedagogue, and founder of the Parkhouse Award, 96
- 9 April – Dmitri Smirnov, Russian-born composer (Tiriel, The Lamentations of Thel), 71 (COVID-19)
- 22 April – Sir Peter Jonas, opera and arts administrator, 73
- 29 April – Martin Lovett, cellist and the last surviving member of the Amadeus Quartet, 93
- 3 May – Dave Greenfield, singer, songwriter, keyboardist (The Stranglers), 71 (COVID-19)
- 6 May – Brian Howe, singer, songwriter (Bad Company), 66 (cardiac arrest)
- 7 May – Ty, English rapper, 47 (COVID-19)
- 13 May – Derek Lawrence, record producer, 78
- 15 May – Phil May, singer (The Pretty Things), 75 (complications following hip surgery)
- 3 June – Rosemarie Wright, pianist, 88. (death announced on this date)
- 4 June – Steve Priest, bass musician, (Sweet), 72
- 5 June – Rupert Hine, musician (Quantum Jump), songwriter and record producer (The Fixx, Howard Jones), 72 (cancer)
- 9 June – Paul Chapman, Welsh rock guitarist (UFO, Lone Star), 66
- 12 June – Ricky Valance, Welsh singer, 84 (dementia)
- 18 June – Dame Vera Lynn, singer, songwriter, and entertainer, 103
- 24 June – Jane Parker-Smith, classical organist, 70
- 1 July – Ida Haendel, Polish-born violinist, 96
- 10 July – Steve Sutherland, disc jockey (Choice FM, Galaxy FM)
- 12 July – Judy Dyble, singer-songwriter (Fairport Convention), 71 (lung cancer)
- 21 July
  - Annie Ross, British-American jazz singer (Lambert, Hendricks & Ross), songwriter ("Twisted"), and actress (Superman III), 89 (complications from emphysema and heart disease)
  - Tim Smith, singer, songwriter, musician (Cardiacs), 59
- 25 July
  - Peter Green, singer-songwriter, guitarist (Fleetwood Mac), 73
  - CP Lee, English musician (Alberto y Lost Trios Paranoias), 70
- 27 July – Denise Johnson, singer, vocalist (Primal Scream), 56
- 6 August – Wayne Fontana, singer, (the Mindbenders), 74 (cancer)
- 8 August – Erich Gruenberg, Austrian-born violinist and teacher, 95.
- 9 August – Martin Birch, music producer and engineer (Deep Purple, Whitesnake, Iron Maiden), 71
- 14 August
  - Julian Bream, classical guitarist and lutenist, 87
  - Pete Way, bassist, (UFO), (Waysted), (Fastway), and session bassist for (Michael Schenker Group) and (Ozzy Osbourne), 69
- 18 August – Roger Quigley, singer-songwriter, 51
- 23 August – Peter King, jazz saxophonist, 80
- 25 August – Gerry McGhee, singer (Brighton Rock, 58 (cancer)
- 26 August – Joyce Wright, opera singer (Gilbert & Sullivan), 98
- 2 September
  - John Shrapnell, journalist, singer and actor, 85
  - Rinat Ibragimov, Russia-born orchestral double bassist and past principal double bass of the London Symphony Orchestra, 60 (COVID-19)
- 5 September – Al G. Wright, band director (Purdue All-American Marching Band), 104
- 10 September – Adrian Clarke, classical baritone
- 19 September
  - Lee Kerslake, drummer (Uriah Heep, The Gods, Toe Fat), 73 (prostate cancer)
  - Dave Kusworth, musician (Jacobites), 60
- 26 September – Jimmy Winston, musician (Small Faces) and actor (Doctor Who), 75
- 29 September – Justin Connolly, classical composer, 87
- 8 October – Brian Locking, rock bass guitarist (The Shadows), 71 (bladder cancer)
- 10 October – Dyan Birch, singer (Arrival, Kokomo), 71 (chronic obstructive pulmonary disease)
- 16 October – Gordon Haskell, singer-songwriter ("How Wonderful You Are") and musician (King Crimson, The Fleur de Lys), 74 (cancer)
- 19 October
  - Spencer Davis, musician and instrumentalist, (The Spencer Davis Group), 81 (pneumonia)
  - Tony Lewis, singer-songwriter, musician, (The Outfield), 62
- 27 October – James Broad, singer-songwriter, guitarist, (Silver Sun), 50 (bowel cancer)
- 30 October – Arthur Wills, organist and composer, 94
- 4 November – Ken Hensley, singer-songwriter, musician, producer (Uriah Heep), 75.
- 9 November – Robert Layton, classical musicologist and critic, 90
- 14 November – Des O'Connor, singer, comedian, television presenter, 88
- 18 November – Tony Hooper, singer-songwriter and musician (Strawbs), 77
- 3 December – Ron Mathewson, jazz double bassist and bass guitarist, 76 (COVID-19)
- 10 December – Kenneth Alwyn, conductor, composer and radio presenter, 95
- 20 December
  - Dame Fanny Waterman, music teacher and founder of the Leeds International Piano Competition, 84
  - Chad Stuart, singer, guitarist and composer (Chad & Jeremy), 79
- 24 December – Catherine Ennis, classical organist
- 28 December – Fou Ts'ong, China-born classical pianist active in the UK, 86 (COVID-19)

== See also ==
- 2020 in British radio
- 2020 in British television
- 2020 in the United Kingdom
