= Luck and Strange =

Studio album by David Gilmour
- Released: 6 September 2024
- Recorded: 2007-2024
- Studios: Medina Studio; Salvation Studios; British Grove Studios; Angel Studios; Astoria Studio; Iguana Studios
- Length: 43:21
- Label: Sony
- Producers: David Gilmour; Charlie Andrew

David Gilmour chronology
Live at Pompeii (2017)	Luck and Strange (2024)	The Luck and Strange Concerts (2025)

Singles from Luck and Strange
- 1. "The Piper's Call" Released: 25 April 2024; 2. "Between Two Points" Released: 17 June 2024; 3. "Dark and Velvet Nights" Released: 9 August 2024; 4. "Luck and Strange" Released: 12 September 2024

Professional ratings
Aggregate scores
Source	Rating
Metacritic	83/100
Review scores
Source	Rating
AllMusic	4/5 stars
Classic Rock	3.5/5 stars
Financial Times	3/5 stars
The Independent	4/5 stars
The Irish Times	4/5 stars
Mojo	4/5 stars
musicOMH	4/5 stars
Record Collector	4/5 stars
Rolling Stone	3.5/5 stars
Uncut	9/10

Luck and Strange is the fifth studio album by the English guitarist and songwriter David Gilmour, released on 6 September 2024 by Sony Music. It was produced by Gilmour and Charlie Andrew.

Gilmour's wife, novelist Polly Samson, wrote most of the lyrics, which she said addressed mortality and aging. Their children contributed additional vocals, lyrics and instrumentation. The song "Luck and Strange" features keyboards recorded in 2007 by the Pink Floyd keyboardist, Richard Wright, who died in 2008. The album also features a cover of the 1999 song "Between Two Points", originally by the British band the Montgolfier Brothers.

Luck and Strange became Gilmour's third number-one album on the UK Albums Chart. "The Piper's Call", "Between Two Points", "Dark and Velvet Nights" and "Luck and Strange" were released as singles. Gilmour toured in support of the album in late 2024.

== Recording ==
During the COVID-19 lockdowns, Gilmour and his family performed music on livestreams. Gilmour, the guitarist of Pink Floyd, said this inspired him to "discard some of the past that I'd felt bound to" and explore new musical ideas. He recorded Luck and Strange over five months at his Medina Studio in Hove and at Mark Knopfler's British Grove Studios in London, with the producer Charlie Andrew. Gilmour said Andrew challenged his habits and made him approach his songs in new ways. He said: "He has a wonderful lack of knowledge or respect for this past of mine. He's very direct and not in any way overawed, and I love that. That is just so good for me because the last thing you want is people just deferring to you." Andrew said he was not "trying to regurgitate another Pink Floyd album, or one of [Gilmour's] solo albums".

The album features musicians including Guy Pratt and Tom Herbert on bass, Adam Betts, Steve Gadd and Steve DiStanislao on drums, and Rob Gentry and Roger Eno on keyboards. The strings and choir were arranged by Will Gardner and recorded in Ely Cathedral, Cambridgeshire. Gilmour's wife, the writer Polly Samson, wrote the majority of the lyrics, which she said reflected themes of mortality and aging. She adapted the lyrics for "Dark and Velvet Nights" from a poem she composed for their wedding anniversary. Their son Gabriel contributed backing vocals, and their son Charlie contributed lyrics to "Scattered".

"Luck and Strange" features keyboards recorded by the Pink Floyd keyboardist, Richard Wright, during a jam in Gilmour's barn in 2007. Wright died in 2008. Gilmour built on the recording to create the final song, saying it "started developing a depth that I'd forgotten about. The playing on it is unmistakably Richard." The original 14-minute jam was included as a bonus track on the digital versions of the album. "The Piper's Call" was likened to early Pink Floyd.

Luck and Strange features a cover of the 1999 song "Between Two Points", originally by the British band the Montgolfier Brothers. Gilmour said he had been a fan of the song since its release and was surprised that it had not been a hit. His daughter, Romany, performed harp and vocals. Mark Tranmer of the Montgolfier Brothers said he enjoyed Gilmour's version, saying "it diverges from the original but keeps the spirit". Gilmour felt Luck and Strange was his best work since the 1973 Pink Floyd album The Dark Side of the Moon.

== Release ==
Gilmour announced Luck and Strange on 24 April 2024. It was released on 6 September, and became Gilmour's third album to reach number one on the UK Albums Chart. The first single, "The Piper's Call", was released on 25 April. "Between Two Points", was released on 17 June. "Dark and Velvet Nights" was released on 9 August. The album cover was photographed and designed by Anton Corbijn. The day before the album was released, Gilmour published lyrics in local newspapers, such as the Cambridge News, and encouraged fans to find them. The digital edition of the album includes the song "Yes, I Have Ghosts", featuring Romany Gilmour; it was originally recorded for the audiobook edition of Samson's 2020 novel A Theatre For Dreamers.

== Tour ==
Gilmour began Luck and Strange, a concert series for the album, on 27 September 2024, with performances in Rome, London, Los Angeles and New York City. Gilmour also performed two rehearsal concerts at Brighton Centre in Brighton. His touring band includes Pratt on bass, Gentry and Greg Phillinganes on keyboards, Adam Betts on drums, Ben Worsley on guitar, and backing vocals from Louise Marshall, Charley Webb, and Hattie Webb, and vocals from Romany Gilmour, who sang "Between Two Points". Gilmour said he planned to record another album with the band soon after completing the tour. In 2025, a concert film, Live at the Circus Maximus, Rome, was released in Imax theatres in September, followed by digital and home media releases in October, along with the live album The Luck and Strange Concerts.

== Critical reception ==
=== Year-end lists ===
Select year-end rankings for Luck and Strange
Publication/critic	Accolade	Rank	Ref.
MOJO	The Best Albums Of 2024	18	
Uncut	80 Best Albums of 2024	48	

== Track listing ==
All lyrics are written by Polly Samson except where noted; all music is composed by David Gilmour except where noted.

Luck and Strange standard edition track listing
No.	Title	Lyrics	Music	Length
1.	"Black Cat"	Instrumental		1:16
2.	"Luck and Strange"			6:54
3.	"The Piper's Call"			5:15
4.	"A Single Spark"			6:02
5.	"Vita Brevis"	Instrumental		0:46
6.	"Between Two Points" (with Romany Gilmour)	Roger Quigley	Mark Tranmer	5:46
7.	"Dark and Velvet Nights"			4:41
8.	"Sings"			5:15
9.	"Scattered"	D. Gilmour; Charlie Gilmour; Samson		7:26
Total length:				43:21

== Personnel ==
- David Gilmour – guitar (all), piano (1), lead vocals (2–4, 7–9), ukulele (3), Höfner bass (3, 8), Farfisa organ (3), backing vocals (2–4, 6–8), keyboards (6, 9), Hammond organ (7), bass guitar (9), Leslie piano (9), Cümbüş (8), production, mixing, engineering
- Richard Wright – electric piano, Hammond organ (2)
- Romany Gilmour – lead vocals (6), backing vocals (2–4, 6–8), harp (5–6)
- Gabriel Gilmour – backing vocals (3, 4)
- Rob Gentry – synthesiser (1–4, 6, 9), keyboards (3, 6, 8–9), piano (4, 6, 8–9), organ (7)
- Roger Eno – piano (1, 9)
- Guy Pratt – bass guitar (2, 3, 6–9)
- Adam Betts – percussion (2, 4, 6–9), djembe (3), drums (4)
- Steve DiStanislao – drums (2)
- Steve Gadd – drums, percussion (3, 6–9)
- Tom Herbert – bass guitar (4)
- Charley Webb – backing vocals
- Hattie Webb – backing vocals
- Louise Marshall – backing vocals
- Edmund Aldhous – organist and director of music at Ely Cathedral
- Ely Cathedral Choir – vocals
- Angel Studios Choir – vocals
- Angel Studios Orchestra
- Will Gardner – orchestral arrangements (1–9)

Technical

- Charlie Andrew – production, mixing, engineering
- Andy Jackson – additional production (2, 3, 7)
- Luie Stylianou – additional production (8)
- Matt Glasbey – mixing, engineering
- Damon Iddins – engineering
- Dick Beetham – mastering

== Charts ==
=== Weekly charts ===
Weekly chart performance for Luck and Strange
Chart (2024–2025)	Peak position
Australian Albums (ARIA)	6
Austrian Albums (Ö3 Austria)	1
Belgian Albums (Ultratop Flanders)	1
Belgian Albums (Ultratop Wallonia)	2
Canadian Albums (Billboard)	14
Croatian International Albums (HDU)	1
Czech Albums (ČNS IFPI)	1
Danish Albums (Hitlisten)	5
Dutch Albums (Album Top 100)	1
Finnish Albums (Suomen virallinen lista)	8
French Albums (SNEP)	2
German Albums (Offizielle Top 100)	1
German Rock & Metal Albums (Offizielle Top 100)	1
Hungarian Albums (MAHASZ)	5
Irish Albums (Official Charts)	9
Italian Albums (FIMI)	2
Japanese Albums (Oricon)	23
Japanese Hot Albums (Billboard Japan)	38
New Zealand Albums (RMNZ)	10
Norwegian Albums (VG-lista)	5
Polish Albums (ZPAV)	1
Portuguese Albums (AFP)	1
Scottish Albums (Official Charts)	1
Slovak Albums (ČNS IFPI)	68
Spanish Albums (Promusicae)	4
Swedish Albums (Sverigetopplistan)	8
Swiss Albums (Schweizer Hitparade)	1
UK Albums (Official Charts)	1
UK Rock & Metal Albums (Official Charts)	1
US Billboard 200	10
US Top Rock & Alternative Albums (Billboard)	4

=== Year-end charts ===
2024 year-end chart performance for Luck and Strange
Chart (2024)	Position
Austrian Albums (Ö3 Austria)	38
Belgian Albums (Ultratop Flanders)	124
Belgian Albums (Ultratop Wallonia)	87
Croatian International Albums (HDU)	22
French Albums (SNEP)	154
German Albums (Offizielle Top 100)	24
Italian Albums (FIMI)	71
Polish Albums (ZPAV)	52
Swiss Albums (Schweizer Hitparade)	18

2025 year-end chart performance for Luck and Strange
Chart (2025)	Position
German Albums (Offizielle Top 100)	48
Swiss Albums (Schweizer Hitparade)	97

== Certifications ==
Region	Certification	Certified units/sales
Germany (BVMI)	Gold	75,000^{‡}
Italy (FIMI)	Gold	25,000^{‡}
Poland (ZPAV)	Gold	10,000^{‡}
United Kingdom (BPI)	Silver	60,000^{‡}
^{‡} Sales+streaming figures based on certification alone.
