= Head in the Clouds =

Head in the Clouds may refer to:

- Head in the Clouds (film), a 2004 Canadian-British film
- Head in the Clouds (album), a 2018 compilation album by 88rising
- "Head in the Clouds" (song), a song by Gerry Cinnamon
- "Head in the Clouds", a song by Union J from the album Union J
- Head in the Clouds Festival, an annual Asian-diaspora music festival organized by 88rising
- Head in the Clouds (BoJack Horseman), a 2018 episode of BoJack Horseman
