= GNAC =

GNAC may refer to:

- Great Northeast Athletic Conference, an NCAA Division III sports league in the Northeast United States
- Great Northwest Athletic Conference, an NCAA Division II sports league in the Northwest United States
- gnac, pseudonym used by British songwriter and music producer Mark Tranmer
