= Where We're Going =

Single by Gerry Cinnamon

from the album The Bonny
- Released: 21 February 2020
- Recorded: 2019
- Length: 4:00
- Label: Little Runaway
- Songwriter: Gerry Cinnamon

Gerry Cinnamon singles chronology
"The Bonny" (2019)	"Where We're Going" (2020)	"Head in the Clouds" (2020)

"Where We're Going" is a song by Scottish singer-songwriter and acoustic guitarist Gerry Cinnamon. It was released as a single on 21 February 2020 by Little Runaway Records as the fifth single from his second studio album The Bonny. The song peaked at number 39 on the UK Singles Chart.

== Background ==
Talking about the song, Gerry Cinnamon said, "I wrote years ago at a dark time in my life. Folk can attach their own meaning to it but really it’s about being in a shit place with no way out, mixed with a gentle reminder to hold on to whatever wee dream you have. A mixture of dark stuff with some positive reality. If you’re in a real shit situation it can be near impossible to see a positive outcome unless you’re either an idiot or a serial optimist. I don’t want to contribute to the negative shit in my writing, there’s more than enough of that going around already. If I write songs about the bad stuff I think it’s only polite to remind the listener of the real reality. That it doesn’t matter where you’re at, it’s where you’re going that matters. Put the graft in and better times are inevitable. Easy."

== Charts ==
Chart (2020)	Peak position
Ireland (IRMA)	43
Scotland Singles (OCC)	4
UK Singles (OCC)	39

== Certifications ==
Certifications for "Where We're Going"
Region	Certification	Certified units/sales
United Kingdom (BPI)	Platinum	600,000^{‡}
^{‡} Sales+streaming figures based on certification alone.

== Release history ==
Region	Date	Format	Label
United Kingdom	21 February 2020	Digital download; streaming	Little Runaway
