= Isle of Wight Festival 2019 =

- Genre: rock, pop
- Dates: 13–16 June 2019
- Locations: Seaclose Park, Isle of Wight, England
- Coordinates: 50.708°N 1.28645°W
- Attendance: 59,000
- Organiser: John Giddings
- Website: www.isleofwightfestival.com

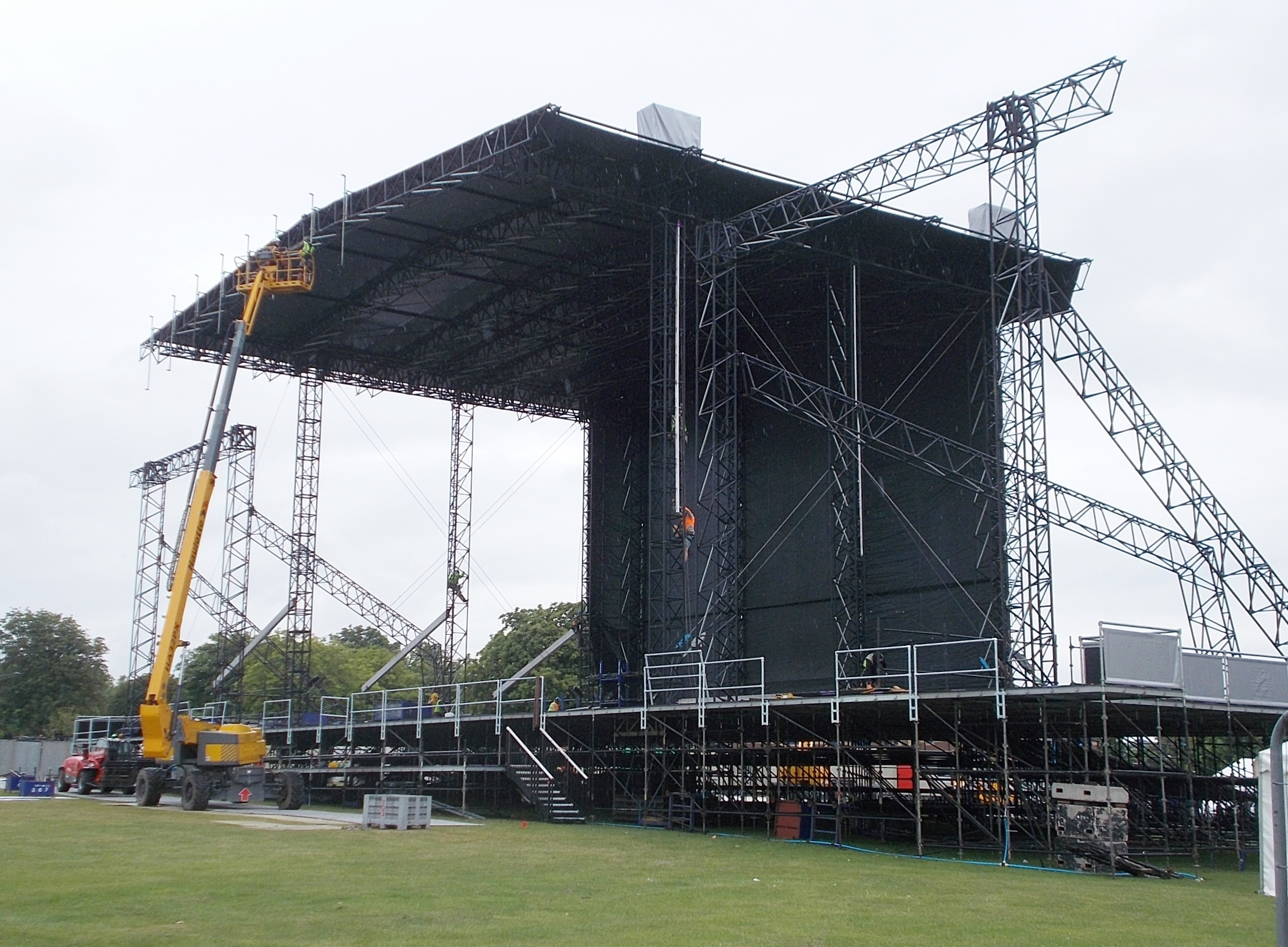
Construction of the main stage

The Isle of Wight Festival 2019 was the eighteenth edition of the revived Isle of Wight Festival, which took place at Seaclose Park in Newport, on the Isle of Wight. It was held on 13 to 16 June 2019. Tickets were released on Friday January 25, 2019 at 9 am.

== Highlights ==
- This iteration of the event sported a "Summer of ‘69 – Peace and Love" theme, celebrating the 50th anniversary of the legendary Isle of Wight Festival 1969. Related activities include a Bob Dylan tribute band opening the festival, a 60's costume contest, and Beatles-themed virtual reality experience in partnership with The Beatles Story museum. Festival organiser John Giddings also asked performers to play a Bob Dylan song, which George Ezra did, covering "Don’t Think Twice It’s Alright".
- Lily Allen held a minute of silence during her Friday set as a tribute to the victims of the Grenfell Tower incident, which happened exactly 2 years earlier. Some audience members broke the silence, and were called out by the singer before resuming her act.
- Cage the Elephant and Sam Fender were both originally scheduled to play on Saturday 15th, but had to cancel their appearance due to injury and illness, respectively. They were replaced on June 12 by Friendly Fires and Yungblud.
- Jess Glynne had been due to perform at the festival on Sunday evening, however she received a lifetime ban from the festival after cancelling her set with only 10 minutes warning. Instead, Richard Ashcroft performed earlier, and Biffy Clyro performed a longer set. The singer confessed that her reason for cancelling was after a heavy night ("It is true that I went out and celebrated the end of the Spice World tour.").

== Line-up ==
=== Main Stage ===
==== Friday ====
- Noel Gallagher's High Flying Birds
- Courteeners
- Lily Allen
- James
- Gerry Cinnamon
- Creeper
- DMA's
- Wild Front

==== Saturday ====
- Fatboy Slim
- George Ezra
- Bastille
- Anne-Marie
- Rick Astley
- Sundara Karma
- KT Tunstall
- Andrew Roachford
- Electric Enemy

==== Sunday ====
- Biffy Clyro
- Richard Ashcroft
- Madness
- Sigrid
- Tom Walker
- Björn Again
- Ferris & Sylvester
- Sub Pacific

=== Big Top ===
==== Thursday ====
- Wet Wet Wet
- Heather Small
- James Walsh
- Simply Dylan

==== Friday ====
- Haçienda Classical
- Jax Jones
- Sigala
- Freya Ridings
- Sea Girls
- Bang Bang Romeo

==== Saturday ====
- Garbage
- Friendly Fires
- Miles Kane
- Yungblud
- Picture This
- Palaye Royale
- Billy Lockett
- The Snuts

==== Sunday ====
- Keane
- Dermot Kennedy
- The Coral
- Idles
- Starsailor
- Ward Thomas
- Feet
- Fatherson
- Lauran Hibberd

=== Other areas ===
==== Platform One Stage ====
The Platform One Stage is programmed and run by the Platform One College of Music. Isle of Wight emerging musicians that were shortlisted for the Wight Noize event on May 11 were granted a spot in the stage's lineup. One such band was selected to open the last day of the festival, Sub Pacific.

Hosted in the Electro Ladyland area of the festival, it was also home to silent disco parties once the mainstage acts finished playing. The organisers also set up a silent karaoke activity, in partnership with a Londonian karaoke venue and a karaoke software company.

==== This Feeling w/ Pirate Studios + Scotts Stage ====
The This Feeling stage was home to 47 upcoming artists during the whole week-end, in collaboration with the This Feeling music promoter. This stage has also appeared on Tramlines and Truck Festivals in 2019.

==== Strongbow Yard ====
The Strongbow Yard was a venue featuring DJ sets, pyrotechnical shows and "Refreshing People Live", a piano duo playing requests from the audience. The whole yard was centered around a ten-metre Strongbow archer statue. It was its first 2019 appearance, before showing up later at Kendal Calling and Victorious festivals.
