= Dark Days (Gerry Cinnamon song) =

Single by Gerry Cinnamon

from the album The Bonny
- Released: 1 November 2019
- Length: 2:55
- Label: Little Runaway
- Songwriter(s): Gerry Cinnamon
- Producer(s): Chris Marshall; Gerry Cinnamon

Gerry Cinnamon singles chronology
"Sun Queen" (2019)	"Dark Days" (2019)	"The Bonny" (2019)

"Dark Days" is a song by Scottish singer-songwriter and acoustic guitarist Gerry Cinnamon. It was released as a single on 1 November 2019 by Little Runaway Records as the third single from his second studio album The Bonny. The song was written by Gerry Cinnamon, who also co-produced the song with Chris Marshall.

== Charts ==
Chart (2019)	Peak position
Scotland (OCC)	11
UK Indie (OCC)	14

== Certifications ==
Region	Certification	Certified units/sales
United Kingdom (BPI)	Silver	200,000^{‡}
^{‡} Sales+streaming figures based on certification alone.

== Release history ==
Region	Date	Format	Label
United Kingdom	1 November 2019	Digital download; streaming	Little Runaway
