= All My Bad Thoughts =

Studio album by The Montgolfier Brothers
- Released: October 17, 2005
- Genre: Indie pop
- Length: 47:08
- Label: Poptones
- Producer: Mark Tranmer; Roger Quigley

The Montgolfier Brothers chronology
The World Is Flat (2002)	All My Bad Thoughts (2005)

Professional ratings
Review scores
Source	Rating
BBC Manchester	

All My Bad Thoughts was the third LP from The Montgolfier Brothers. It was released through the Vespertine and Son label in 2005.

== Track listing ==
1. "The First Rumours of Spring" – 3:58
2. "Don't Get Upset If I..." – 2:32
3. "All My Bad Thoughts" – 4:01
4. "Sins and Omissions" – 5:21
5. "Stopping for Breath" – 2:49
6. "Koffee Pot" – 4:56
7. "Brecht's Lost Waltz / Summer Is Over" – 4:58
8. "Quite an Adventure" – 2:04
9. "Journey's End" – 8:09
10. "It's Over, It's Ended, It's Finished, It's Done" – 8:18
