= Canter (song) =

Single by Gerry Cinnamon

from the album The Bonny
- Released: 22 June 2019
- Length: 4:26
- Label: Little Runaway

Gerry Cinnamon singles chronology
"Sometimes" (2018)	"Canter" (2019)	"Sun Queen" (2019)

"Canter" is a song by Scottish singer-songwriter and acoustic guitarist Gerry Cinnamon. It was released as a single on 22 June 2019 by Little Runaway Records as the lead single from his second studio album The Bonny.

== Background ==
In an interview with Radio X, Cinnamon said, "It's an upbeat tune. It's just one of those tunes I try and drop some knowledge bombs. When I was a wee guy I was always trying to look for a bit of Gold in a song, for a bit of advice, so I think it's me just talking to myself. I wrote this a couple of weeks before the Barras [Glasgow Barrowlands], and it's just one of them that's demanded [at gigs]. Same thing happened with Belter." He also confirmed that the word 'canter' is Scots for 'easy peasy'.

== Charts ==
Chart (2019)	Peak position
Ireland (IRMA)	19
Scotland Singles (Official Charts)	1
UK Singles (Official Charts)	50
UK Indie (Official Charts)	5

== Certifications ==
Certifications and sales for "Canter"
Region	Certification	Certified units/sales
United Kingdom (BPI)	2× Platinum	1,200,000^{‡}
^{‡} Sales+streaming figures based on certification alone.

== Release history ==
Region	Date	Format	Label
United Kingdom	22 June 2019	Digital download; streaming	Little Runaway
