= Gnac =

- Birth name: Mark Tranmer
- Occupation(s): Songwriter, music producer
- Years active: 1999–present

gnac is a pseudonym used by songwriter and music producer Mark Tranmer. The name is derived from a short story by Italo Calvino in Marcovaldo titled Luna e GNAC (or "moon and gnac").

Tranmer's music has been described as "imaginary film soundtracks" with comparisons made to Michael Nyman, Ennio Morricone, and Michel Legrand. Vini Reilly has been identified as an influence.

After releasing several singles between 1998 and early 1999, his debut album, Friend Sleeping, was released in July 1999 on the Vespertine label. For his second studio album he moved to Alan McGee's Poptones label. Tranmer also recorded with Roger Quigley under the name The Montgolfier Brothers, releasing three albums.

Tranmer has also released an album under his own name, and has recorded with Ian Masters (of Pale Saints/Spoonfed Hybrid) under the name Wingdisk.

== Discography ==
=== Gnac ===
==== Albums ====
- Friend Sleeping (1999), Vespertine
- Biscuit Barrel Fashion (2001), Poptones
- Twelve Sidelong Glances (2006), LTM/Boutique NL
- The Arrival of the Fog (2007), LTM/Boutique NL
- The Red Pages (2010), Vertical Features

==== Compilations ====
- Sevens (2000), Rocket Girl
- Soviet Bureau (2004), Russia-only release via Soyuz

==== Singles, EPs ====
- In Mauve EP (1998), Amberly
- "The Moustache" (1998), Earworm
- "A Tangle With..." (1998), Kooky
- "Our Distance" (1999), Darla
- "Hennebert Sleeve" (1999), Liquefaction
- "18th Century Quiz Show" (1999), Acetone
- Split single with Smooth Operator (2001), Octane Gramaphone

=== Mark Tranmer ===
- Scoop of Ice-cream Moon (2004), Kooky

=== with The Montgolfier Brothers ===
==== Albums ====
- Seventeen Stars (1999), Vespertine
- The World Is Flat (2002), Poptones
- All My Bad Thoughts (2005), Poptones

==== Singles ====
- "Pro Celebrity Standing Around" (2001), Poptones

=== with Wingdisk ===
- Time Is Running Out EP (2003), Isonauta
