= Head in the Clouds (song) =

Single by Gerry Cinnamon

from the album The Bonny
- Released: 13 April 2020
- Length: 3:53
- Label: Little Runaway Records
- Songwriter(s): Gerry Cinnamon

Gerry Cinnamon singles chronology
"Where We're Going" (2020)	"Head in the Clouds" (2020)

"Head in the Clouds" is a song by Scottish singer-songwriter and acoustic guitarist Gerry Cinnamon. It was released as a single on 13 April 2020 by Little Runaway Records as the sixth single from his second studio album The Bonny.

== Background ==
Talking about the song, Gerry Cinnamon said it "kinda documents my nightly battles with insomnia where every few weeks everything goes tits up, as it would for most folk if they didn’t sleep for three days, but there is also a loose narrative of a kinda love story."

== Charts ==
Chart (2020)	Peak position
Ireland (IRMA)	60
Scotland (OCC)	30
UK Singles (OCC)	65

== Release history ==
Region	Date	Format	Label
United Kingdom	14 April 2020	Digital download; streaming	Little Runaway
