= Jason Iley =

English CEO

Jason Iley MBE
- Born: Jason Iley
- Origin: London, England
- Genres: Dance, pop, hip hop, R&B, rock
- Occupation: Music industry executive
- Years active: 1994–present
- Labels: Sony Music, Mercury Records, Roc Nation Records, Epic, Columbia Records, RCA Records, Relentless, Insanity Records, Ministry Of Sound

Jason Iley MBE is the current chairman and CEO of Sony Music UK. Formerly President of Roc Nation Records and the UK chief of Mercury Records, Iley currently heads up all of Sony Music's activities in the UK and Ireland, overseeing Sony Music's frontline and imprint labels across the region, including the operations of Columbia, Epic, RCA, Commercial Group, Relentless, Since '93 and Robots + Humans. Iley was instrumental in Sony Music UK's acquisition of Ministry Of Sound Recordings.

== Career overview ==
Posts held at record companies since 2005:

- Mercury Records - Managing Director - 2005 - 2006
- Mercury Records - President - 2006 - 2013
- Roc Nation - President - 2013 - 2014
- Sony Music Entertainment - Chairman & CEO - 2014–Present

== Career ==
Iley began his career as a product manager at Sony Music in 1994, and subsequently worked at Universal Music UK across labels including Polydor Records and Island Records.

=== Mercury Records 2005 - 2013 ===
In May 2005, Iley was appointed Managing Director of Mercury Records, and left his role at Island. The following year, Iley was promoted to President, and worked with established artists such as Sir Elton John, Sir Paul McCartney, U2, and Rihanna, as well as emerging acts like Chase & Status and Jake Bugg.

U2, who previously had a long-standing association with Island Records, followed Iley to Mercury Records in October 2006. The Independent described their move to the label, stating "Their closest ally ... Jason Iley, was appointed managing director of Mercury Records last year, and the band have now followed him there." A similar report posted on Virgin.net cited, "U2 are keen to continue working with Jason Iley, who switched from Island to Mercury to become their President earlier this year."

=== President of Roc Nation ===
In June 2013, Roc Nation Records, founded by Shawn “Jay-Z” Carter and home to artists such as J. Cole, Rita Ora and Jay Electronica, announced Jason Iley would become its President, based out of New York.

=== Chairman and CEO Sony Music UK and Ireland ===
Sony Music CEO Doug Morris announced that Iley would become chairman and CEO of Sony Music UK & Ireland in April 2014.

In 2014, Iley brought Black Butter Records into the Sony Music fold who went on to sign and develop J Hus. In 2015, he negotiated a deal with Insanity Records – the label's first signing was Craig David, who scored his first No.1 album in 16 years. He also invested in new joint venture labels, Since '93, 5K Records and Robots + Humans. Iley engineered the launch of new department 4th Floor Creative, bringing together Sony Music UK's creative discipline and appointed Cassandra Gracey as President. Iley said: “I’ve always wanted to work with Cassandra, who is a highly respected, dynamic executive.”

In 2015, Jason appointed British A&R, DJ, music-maker and broadcaster DJ Semtex as Director of Artist Development, who returned to the company after 14 years claiming he was “looking forward to working with Jason, in a new era at Sony Music.”

Industry trade magazine 'Music Week' credited Iley's acquisitions and exec changes for Sony ending 2017 with its highest market share ever. Paloma Faith publicly praised Jason for the changes he made at Sony Music since becoming Chairman and labelled him “by far my favourite human to have encountered”.

In 2016, Iley negotiated a deal that saw Robbie Williams move to Sony Music to record his 11th album. Jason commented that the agreement was "a once in a lifetime signing with the biggest male solo artist of our generation." After the release of his album The Heavy Entertainment Show, Robbie Williams became the record holder for most UK number one albums by a British solo artist.

Under Iley's leadership, in 2014 the company achieved its best singles success for 33 years, with 11 Number 1 singles. At the 2015 BRIT Awards, Sony Music artists won a total of five individual awards, which was Sony's best in nearly 20 years. At the 2017 BRIT Awards, Iley's company dominated, winning 9 out of 13 awards. Iley commented that it was a "momentous and historic night" for Sony Music artists.

Iley partnered with mental health charity Mind and signed an initiative on behalf of Sony Music, which aimed to increase awareness and understanding of mental health. During Mental Health Awareness Week in 2018, Iley announced that Sony Music UK would offer their employees ‘Premium Days’ – two days, in addition to holiday, for personal development. This campaign was backed by Sony Music artists. Alongside George Ezra, he publicly supported The BRITs when they chose Mind as their 2018 charity partner, commenting, “Mind do wonderful life-saving and life-enhancing work in the field of mental health, so I’m delighted that The BRITs can make a contribution to their vital campaign in schools". In a Music Week interview he added, "it's okay to talk about these issues". In 2021 Iley spoke to The Telegraph and reiterated his feelings about the importance of mental wellbeing - "We're in an artist and people industry - that's why we have to be aware of the issues". Iley also announced the hire of Elton Jackson to a newly created position of Director of Artist and Employee Wellbeing at Sony Music UK, underlining his ongoing commitment to ensuring artists and employees feel well supported.

Iley stated Sony Music's commitment to supporting the Music Venue Trust's campaign in protecting small UK venues, saying "We recognise the vital role that grassroots music venues play, providing an essential platform for artists to be able to take their first steps and develop their audiences". Under Iley's direction Sony Music became the first company in the UK to offer additional leave for parents of premature babies. He said of the policy, “We appreciate that it can be an extremely difficult and worrying time for those who experience premature labour and family is of the upmost importance.” In 2022, Sony Music announced a £15,000 childcare scheme to help its employees through the cost-of-living crisis, taking the burden off working parents. The policy won Best DE&I Initiative at the 2024 Women In Music Awards.

Jason was the first signatory from the entertainment industry to The Valuable 500 campaign for disability inclusion. In 2021, Iley announced the hire of Charlotte Edgeworth as the company's first Director of Diversity, Inclusion and Social Impact. Jason said "Charlotte's leadership role reinforces our efforts to ensure our company truly reflects the diversity of our employees and artists".

Jason Iley was named on Variety’s Power Players Across the World List in 2019. He was listed on Billboard's 2025 Global Power Players List for the ninth consecutive year, listed on the inaugural UK Power Players list and appeared on the Evening Standard's annual "London's Most Influential People" list in 2019 for the sixth consecutive year, alongside George Ezra and Ed Sheeran.

Iley was appointed Member of the Order of the British Empire (MBE) in the 2020 Birthday Honours for services to music and charity.

Iley was announced as the recipient of the 2024 U.K.’s Music Industry Trusts Award (MITS) in recognition of his contribution to the British record business. On the night, he was presented the award by Paloma Faith who described him as ’the most caring record exec’ she’s ever come across. There were performances from Jake Bugg, Cat Burns and Mark Ronson and artists in attendance included Calvin Harris, Jade Thirlwall, Perrie Edwards and Rag’n’Bone Man. Video tributes came from artists and executives including Rob Stringer, Sir Lucian Grainge, U2, Mariah Carey, Pink and The Killers. While accepting the award Jason said 'I feel truly honoured’. In 2024 Iley did an interview with leading music publication, Music Business Worldwide where he discussed his upbringing, musical influences, life lessons and his time at Sony Music.

At the Music Week Awards 2026, Jason was given the prestigious STRAT Award, recognising outstanding achievement and lasting impact. JADE presented the award to him and described him as “a person who has devoted himself to championing artists for thirty years”.

=== Ministry of Sound Acquisition ===
Under Iley's tenure, in August 2016 Sony Music acquired Ministry of Sound Recordings, home to London Grammar, DJ Fresh and Sigala, bringing the label – including its artists, back catalogue and compilations – under the Sony Music umbrella.

=== BRITs ===
Jason Iley was Chairman of the BRITs Committee and was responsible for the look, feel and creative element of the BRIT Awards. During his tenure Iley was responsible for a shake-up of the BRITs Voting Academy, declaring the BRITs had “a responsibility to be truly reflective of what is happening in music". Iley was widely praised for shaking up the event. Subsequently, after the 2018 awards show, The Independent published a headline that read "Brit Awards 2018: Finally paying attention to British music".

Under the direction of Iley, The BRITs partnered with mental health charity Mind. Across his years half a million pounds was donated to support mental wellbeing for young people. Jason said of the donation, "The difference that these charities make towards people's lives is immeasurable and addressing this subject within schools is vital to a progressive and optimistic future".

Iley appointed British architect Dame Zaha Hadid to create the 2017 award statue. In 2018 he commissioned Sir Anish Kapoor – the first sculptor to re-imagine the award and in his final year as Chairman, he announced Sir David Adjaye OBE would create the 2019 statue – completing a trilogy of world-renowned British creatives.

Jason appointed Jack Whitehall who made his debut as BRITs host in 2018, The Telegraph labelled him as “the best Brits host in years”. Across the three years the show featured more than fifty artist performances including Ed Sheeran, Little Mix, Stormzy, Dua Lipa, Foo Fighters, Rag’n’Bone Man, P!NK and Calvin Harris – who made his debut BRITs performance. The shows also featured a number of poignant tributes – Gary Barlow and Liam Gallagher, who paid tribute to victims of the Manchester terror attack [2018] and after the devastating loss of George Michael, his former Wham! bandmates delivered a heartfelt tribute, alongside a performance from Chris Martin.

In 2026, Sony Music assumed responsibility for the BRIT Awards for the first time in seven years, with jason overseeing the relocation of the ceremony to Manchester. The move marked a change in venue and format, drawing attention from industry observers. Performers at the event included Harry Styles, Rosalia, and Mark Ronson. The broadcast reached a large global audience. For the first time, the BRIT Awards introduced a citywide fringe initiative, which included an art trail and an exhibition of music-related artwork. These activities formed part of a broader program of events held across Machester in connection with the awards.
