= The Montgolfier Brothers =

UK musical group

- Genres: Indie pop, dream pop, indie folk
- Years active: 1999–2020
- Label: Vespertine & Son
- Members: Mark Tranmer
- Past members: Roger Quigley (died 2020)

The Montgolfier Brothers were a British indie pop-dream pop duo which featured gnac's Mark Tranmer and Lovewood drummer Roger Quigley.

The group, which formed in 1999, has released several recordings. Roger Quigley died on 18 August 2020.

Their song "Between Two Points" was covered by David Gilmour and his daughter Romany Gilmour on his album Luck and Strange.

== Discography ==
=== Seventeen Stars (1999) ===
Seventeen Stars was the band's debut recording. It was released on 4 May 1999 on the Vespertine label before the company folded. It was later reissued by Quarterstick in the United States, and by Alan McGee's Poptones elsewhere.

==== Track listing ====
1. "Time Spent Passing" – 2:16
2. "Even If My Mind Can't Tell You" – 6:14
3. "Pro-Celebrity Standing Around" – 1:45
4. "Four Days" – 5:05
5. "Seventeen Stars" – 6:12
6. "Low Tide" – 5:12
7. "In Walks a Ghost" – 5:17
8. "Une Chanson Du Crépuscule" – 2:59
9. "Between Two Points" – 6:02
10. "Fin" – 1:39

=== The World Is Flat (2002) ===
Professional ratings
Review scores
Source	Rating
Allmusic	4/5 stars

The World Is Flat was released in 2002 on the Poptones imprint.

==== Track listing ====
1. "2:55" – 2:47
2. "The Understudy" – 2:46
3. "Be Selfish" – 7:42
4. "The World Is Flat" – 5:09
5. "The Second Takes Forever" – 2:50
6. "Swings and Roundabouts" – 4:57
7. "Dream in Organza" – 4:56
8. "I Couldn't Sleep, Either" – 4:35
9. "Think Once More" – 3:32
10. "Inches Away" – 7:19
