= Erratic Cinematic =

Studio album by Gerry Cinnamon
- Released: 28 September 2017
- Length: 31:23
- Label: Little Runaway

Gerry Cinnamon chronology
Erratic Cinematic (2017)	The Bonny (2020)

Singles from Erratic Cinematic
- 1. "Belter" Released: 2017; 2. "Sometimes" Released: 2018

Erratic Cinematic is the debut studio album by the Scottish singer-songwriter and acoustic guitarist Gerry Cinnamon. It was released on 28 September 2017 by LR Records. The album peaked at number 17 on the UK Albums Chart. The album includes the singles "Belter" and "Sometimes".

== Track listing ==
No.	Title	Length
1.	"Sometimes"	3:16
2.	"Lullaby"	4:47
3.	"What Have You Done"	2:31
4.	"Belter"	3:14
5.	"Fortune Favours the Bold"	2:46
6.	"Erratic Cinematic"	4:09
7.	"Keysies"	1:31
8.	"Diamonds in the Mud"	4:40
9.	"War TV"	4:29
Total length:		31:23

== Charts ==
=== Weekly charts ===
Chart (2017–2019)	Peak position
Irish Albums (IRMA)	8
Scottish Albums (OCC)	3
UK Albums (OCC)	17

=== Year-end charts ===
Chart (2020)	Position
UK Albums (OCC)	77

== Release history ==
Region	Date	Format	Label
United Kingdom	26 September 2017	CD, DL, LP	Little Runaway
