= Gerry Cinnamon =

Scottish singer and guitarist (born 1984)

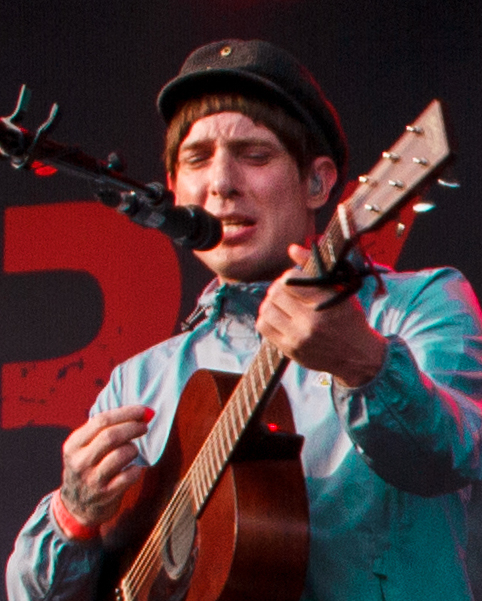
- Cinnamon performing in 2019

Background information
- Born: Gerard Crosbie; 1 October 1984 (age 42); Glasgow, Scotland
- Genres: Indie rock; indie folk; folk rock; anti-folk
- Occupations: Musician; singer; songwriter
- Instruments: Vocals; guitar; harmonica
- Years active: 2005–present
- Labels: Little Runaway Music; GC Music
- Website: gerrycinnamonmusic.com

Gerard Crosbie (born 1 October 1984), professionally known as Gerry Cinnamon, is a Scottish singer-songwriter. He released his debut album Erratic Cinematic in September 2017 and spawned the successful singles "Belter" and "Sometimes", both of which were certified double Platinum by the British Phonographic Industry (BPI).

The album achieved similar success, reaching number three on the Scottish Albums Charts, and earning a Platinum certification from the BPI. He released his second album, The Bonny, in April 2020, supported by the lead single "Canter" which was released the previous year. It topped the Scottish Singles Charts, reached the top twenty of the Irish Singles Charts and was certified Platinum by the BPI. The albums fifth single, "Where We're Going", became his first Top 40 appearance on the UK Singles Charts. The album reached number one on both the Scottish Albums Charts and UK Albums Chart and became the third biggest selling UK album released that year.

He sings in his local Glaswegian accent. In 2023, his live album Live at Hampden Park debuted atop the albums charts in his native Scotland. Several of Cinnamon's other non–single releases have been certified by the BPI, including "Fickle McSelfish", "Lullaby" and "Fortune Favours The Bold". In 2016, he was awarded the award for Best Live Act at the Scottish Music Awards, and in 2019 received the Entertainment Award at the Great Scot Awards.

== Early life ==
Crosbie was raised in The Valley, a neighbourhood in the Castlemilk district of Glasgow. He has stated that as a child he listened to his mother's music cassettes including albums by The Rolling Stones, Simon & Garfunkel and The Beatles. He has said that he was a fan of Oasis, and The La's. He has a particular admiration for the work of Bob Dylan.

Having experienced problems in the local area and in school as a young teenager, he spent some time living in London with the father of a friend; finding himself with little to do "apart from watch cricket or play guitar", he became proficient in the instrument (as well as the harmonica). On returning to Scotland he began writing songs, with his growing interest in creating and performing music proving a distraction in his attempts to hold down jobs in various industries over several years.

== Career ==
=== Beginnings (2005–2017) ===
While performing a solo gig at a college he met aspiring producer Chris Marshall, a neighbour from Castlemilk. They began collaborating on a casual basis with Marshall arranging the songs and Crosbie the lyricist, and eventually formed a lo-fi band, The Cinnamons, along with Lori Duncan, Dave Bass and Gav Hunter; with Gerry as frontman, they released a five-song EP in 2010. Crosbie subsequently adopted the Cinnamon name as a solo performer and his later catalogue contains some compositions from the era, such as "Sometimes". An open mic night in a bar on Sauchiehall Street in central Glasgow gave him an opportunity to perform his songs, and the event became increasingly popular. In 2014, having sold-out gigs at small venues purely through word of mouth and social media, he was invited to write and perform a song at a rally event in George Square ahead of the referendum on Scottish independence. The song, "Hope Over Fear", which was released as a single, introduced him to a wider audience – however he has stated that he had no desire to become a figurehead for the Yes campaign.

In summer 2015, Cinnamon supported John Power on tour, released another single, "Kampfire Vampire", and performed to a large crowd on the T-Break Stage at T in the Park, fulfilling a long-held ambition to play at the festival. In July 2016, he again performed at T in the Park, this time at the King Tut's Wah Wah Tent stage as he had hoped to do a year earlier. Despite having one of the traditionally least popular time slots across the weekend (2pm on Friday), his performance was again well-attended. In October he was announced as 'Best Live Act' at the 2016 Scottish Alternative Music Awards.

In November, without being signed to a record label, he headlined at Glasgow's O2 ABC Glasgow, the promotion of which had consisted of a single message on his Facebook profile; he later admitted he was so disorganised that he had not prepared a set list for the performance. In December, he supported Ocean Colour Scene in their show at the SSE Hydro.

=== Breakthrough and Erratic Cinematic (2017–2018) ===
In July 2017, Cinnamon appeared on the King Tut's stage at the TRNSMT festival (a non-camping replacement for T in the Park) on Glasgow Green, again playing to a sizeable and enthusiastic crowd. In September, he released his first album Erratic Cinematic, funded via the PledgeMusic platform and produced by Chris Marshall, which rose to the number 1 spot in the UK iTunes chart for singer-songwriters and 6th overall. On the back of the album's release, he announced a show at the Barrowland Ballroom to take place in December, followed a few days later by a second date. This achievement – a first for an unsigned artist – later earned him a place in the 'Barrowland Hall of Fame' alongside the likes of Glasgow son Frankie Miller, Noel Gallagher, David Bowie and Ocean Colour Scene. In October, he was presented with a "Great Scot Award" for entertainment, following previous winners of the category such as Paolo Nutini and Kevin Bridges. In December it was confirmed he would be returning to TRNSMT in 2018, this time on the main stage.

A few days before playing his Barrowland gigs, Cinnamon spoke out against operators of ticket scalping websites, after discovering they had purchased gig tickets at face value and then offered them for sale on their sites to desperate fans at hugely inflated prices. Following his main stage performance at TRNSMT 2018, his debut album entered the Scottish Albums Chart, peaking at no. 7 in July 2018. The early months of 2018 were dominated by a sold-out Scottish tour, followed by several dates across the rest of Britain and Ireland, with some gigs moved to higher capacity venues due to the demand. During one performance in Inverness, he briefly stopped playing to confront a member of the audience who had thrown a drink onto the stage. On 28 June 2018, two days before the event, the organisers of TRNSMT announced that Cinnamon's performance at the festival had been moved to a later, higher profile time slot (benefitting from J Hus's cancellation). He was also booked to play at the RiZE Festival (the replacement of the long-running V Festival) and the Tartan Heart Festival (Belladrum) during August 2018.

A further four gigs were announced for the coming December in Glasgow, including on Christmas Eve; those also sold out. Some complained to Cinnamon via social media about the prices of tickets available on resale sites, leading him to respond publicly "If you think I want some corporate goon reselling my ticks for 10x the asking price you've lost it. If you think I'm somehow involved or can stop it when the biggest bands in the world can't do anything about it then you're misinformed at best". Further December 2018 shows in Dundee, Aberdeen and Kilmarnock were later announced.

Following a run of arena shows supporting The Courteeners, Cinnamon announced his own England and Ireland tour. Cinnamon headlined a stage at Edinburgh's Hogmanay 2018/19 street party. In January 2019, he played two gigs in Amsterdam. In February, he was announced as one of the Friday main stage performers at the forthcoming TRNSMT event in July, and was also added to the bill for several other festivals in the summer season including Benicàssim, Isle of Wight, Kendal Calling, Y Not and Glastonbury Festival.

=== The Bonny (2019–2021) ===
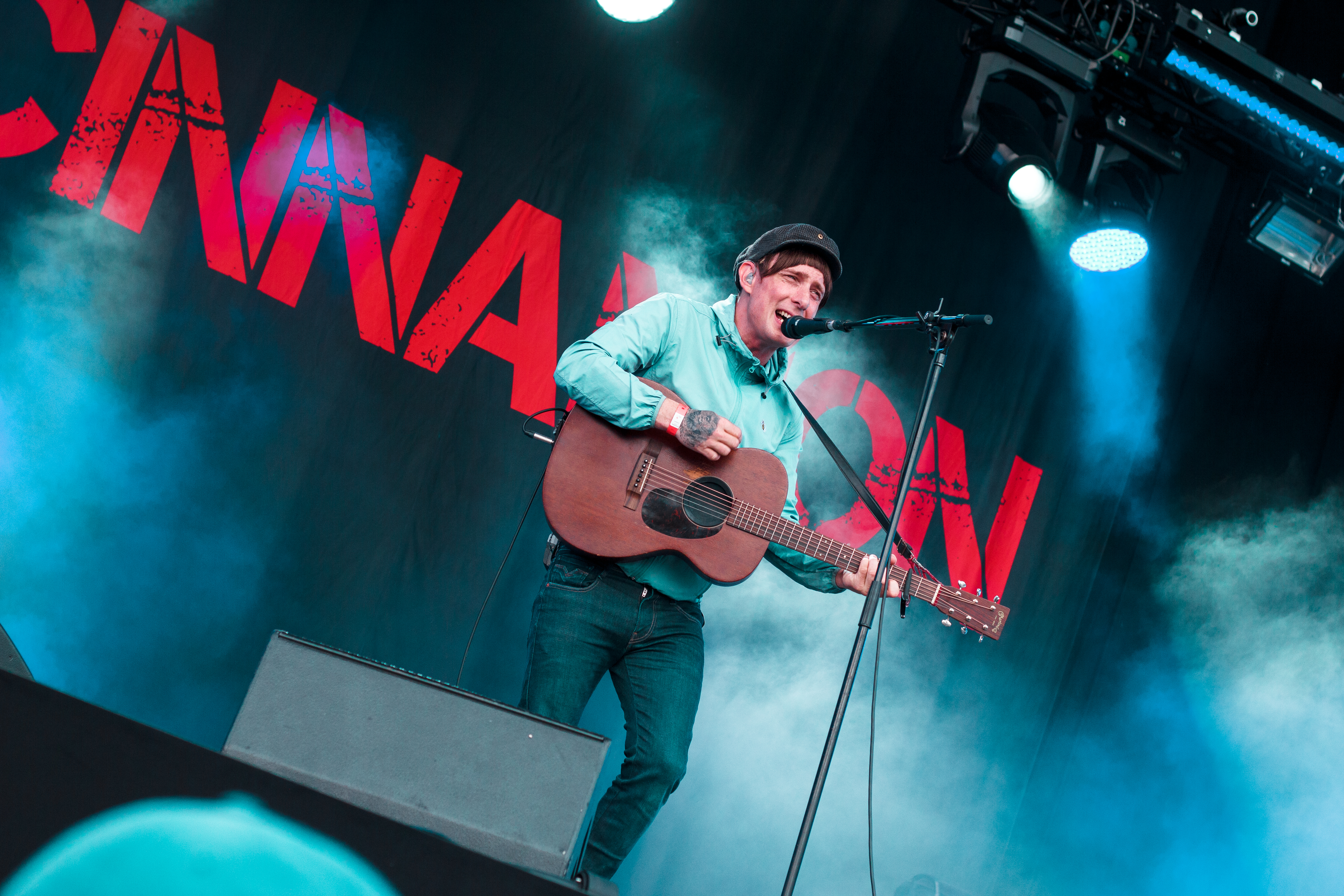
Cinnamon performing at the Haldern Pop Festival in 2019

On 7 May 2019, it was announced that Cinnamon would support Liam Gallagher at his gig at Irish Independent Park in Cork on 23 June 2019. On 12 July, it was announced that he would be performing at the new P&J Live venue in Aberdeen on Saturday 23 November, which subsequently broke the record for highest attendance at a Scottish indoor event at 15,000 attendees, and two shows at the SSE Hydro in his hometown of Glasgow on Friday 20 December. The arena tour was further extended throughout venues in England and Ireland with all 125,000 tickets selling out in advance. In December, Cinnamon supported Liam Gallagher during his Australian tour as well as playing his own shows in Sydney, Brisbane and Melbourne.

In November 2019, Cinnamon announced his second album named The Bonny would be released on 17 April 2020 on his own label Little Runaway. Alongside the album announcement, Cinnamon revealed that he will play the biggest show of his career at the 50,000+ capacity Hampden Park, becoming the first Scottish act to headline the national stadium. Tickets went on sale on 15 November 2019 and were sold out within hours. On 11 February 2020, it was announced that Gerry Cinnamon would perform the penultimate slot at Reading and Leeds festival in August 2020; the festivals were later rescheduled due to COVID-19 restrictions. Cinnamon went on to play the penultimate slot at Reading and Leeds Festival in August 2021.

Gerry Cinnamon's second studio album, The Bonny, released on 17 April 2020 debuted at number one on the UK and Irish Albums Charts. The album was also the fastest-selling vinyl of the year and the third biggest-selling UK album released in 2020. Cinnamon was scheduled to tour the United States for the first time as well as join the Dropkick Murphys and Rancid as special guest on their May 2020 tour, pending the status of the COVID-19 outbreak there. On 21 May 2020, Cinnamon announced that due to the coronavirus pandemic, he had moved the dates for his UK and Ireland tour to May and June 2021.

=== Continued success (2021–present) ===
Gerry spent 2021-2022 playing his biggest shows to date. His 350,000-capacity UK and Ireland tour, originally due to happen in 2020, included shows at Birmingham and Manchester Arenas, London's Alexandra Palace, the 25,000 capacity Malahide Castle, Dublin, and Musgrave Park Stadium, Cork. He also headlined at Swansea's Singleton Park, the second biggest show ever held in the Welsh city, and set the record as the first artist to sell out three headline shows at the Belsonic, Belfast, playing to over 60,000 fans.

Cinnamon was due to play Shaky Knees Music Festival on 30 April 2022, but show organizers announced on April 18 that he would not be performing. No details were forthcoming. The tour concluded with two homecoming shows at Hampden Park. With these shows, playing to over 100,000 people, Cinnamon was the first independent act and first Scot to sell out multiple nights at the national stadium.

The ‘Live at Hampden Park’ live album was released a year later being Gerry’s first live album and it contained all 20 songs from the Saturday show however the CD specially contained the Sunday version of ‘Canter’ alongside the other 20 Saturday songs. Cinnamon remained relatively silent until November 2023 where he announced that he would be headlining TRNSMT 2024 and playing as a co-headliner at the Reading and Leeds Festival 2024. Cinnamon also was to play Electric Picnic in Ireland and By the Pond in Norway.

As of October 2026, Gerry Cinnamon's most recent social media post to Instagram in October 2024 contained a Reading and Leeds highlights collage with a message below stating, “Wee Reading and Leeds vid - forgot to post it. In studio tracking new album. Hope everybody’s good. Big love Gx”.

== Views on the music industry ==
He has encouraged aspiring artists to believe in themselves despite a lack of expensive backing, and expressed a scathing distaste for the nature of music industry marketing and excessive hyping artists, stating in 2016:

"The only reason I'm in this game is because it's full of imposters ruining music and my very existence annoys them and it pleases me. If you're a working class musician hearing this or reading it and you respect the art of song writing more than the art of pretending then you have a responsibility to get involved. There's a war on for real music and if you're sound and can write decent tunes then you're on the front line whether you like it or not."

== Discography ==
=== Studio albums ===
Title	Details	Peak chart positions						Certifications
Title	Details	SCO	AUS	IRE	SWI	UK	UK Indie	Certifications
Erratic Cinematic	Released: 28 September 2017; Label: LR Records (MD2020), (001) LP; Formats: CD, DL, LP	3	—	8	—	17	3	BPI: Platinum
The Bonny	Released: 17 April 2020; Label: LR Records; Formats: CD, DL, LP, cassette	1	70	1	62	1	1	BPI: Platinum
"—" denotes a recording that did not chart or was not released in that territory.

=== Live albums ===
Title	Details	Peak chart positions		
Title	Details	SCO	IRE	UK
Live at Hampden Park	Released: 14 July 2023; Label: Little Runaway, AWAL; Formats: LP, digital download, streaming	1	75	12

=== Singles ===
Title	Year	Peak chart positions				Certifications	Album
Title	Year	SCO	IRE	UK	UK Indie	Certifications	Album
"Hope Over Fear"	2014	—	—	—	—		Non-album singles
"Kampfire Vampire"	2015	42	—	—	—	BPI: Silver	Non-album singles
"Belter"	2017	12	20	88	12	BPI: 2× Platinum	Erratic Cinematic
"Sometimes"	2018	33	57	98	7	BPI: 2× Platinum	Erratic Cinematic
"Canter"	2019	1	19	50	5	BPI: 2× Platinum	The Bonny
"Sun Queen"	2019	2	52	64	7	BPI: Gold	The Bonny
"Dark Days"	2019	11	—	—	14	BPI: Silver	The Bonny
"The Bonny"	2019	6	76	—	13	BPI: Silver	The Bonny
"Where We're Going"	2020	4	43	39	2	BPI: Platinum	The Bonny
"Head in the Clouds"	2020	30	60	65	7		The Bonny
"—" denotes a recording that did not chart or was not released in that territory.

=== Other certified songs ===
Title	Year	Certifications	Album
"Fickle McSelfish"	2015	BPI: Silver	Non-album singles
"What Have You Done"	2017	BPI: Gold	Erratic Cinematic
"Lullaby"	2017	BPI: Gold	Erratic Cinematic
"Diamonds In The Mud"	2017	BPI: Gold	Erratic Cinematic
"Fortune Favours The Bold"	2017	BPI: Silver	Erratic Cinematic
