= Rosemarie Wright =

English musician (1931–2020)

Rosemarie Wright (12 December 1931 – 25 April 2020) was an English pianist.

Wright was born in Chorley, Lancashire. She studied at the Royal Academy of Music with Patrick Cory and Harold Craxton, winning many prizes including the Chappell Silver Medal and Tobias Matthay Fellowship. Her later studies were with Bruno Seidlhofer at the Vienna Academy of MusicStaatsakademie, and with Edwin Fischer and Wilhelm Kempff. She studied chamber music with the cellist Pablo Casals. Wright won the Haydn Prize in the International Haydn-Schubert Competition in Vienna in 1959, and in 1960 became the first British pianist ever to win the Bösendorfer Prize.

Wright made her recital debut in the Großer Saal of the Vienna Musikverein in 1960, stepping in for an indisposed Martha Argerich. This launched a distinguished international career including recitals, concerto performances and chamber music worldwide. She appeared as concerto soloist with many of Europe's renowned orchestras and with many distinguished conductors, and was broadcast from over thirty different European radio stations. At home she made her debut at the Proms at the Royal Albert Hall in 1971, as soloist with the Philharmonia Orchestra conducted by Sir Adrian Boult.

Wright was pianist-in-residence at the University of Southampton (1972–1980), senior lecturer in keyboard studies at the Royal Northern College of Music (RNCM) (1972–78) and professor of piano at the Royal Academy of Music (1978–1997). She was elected a fellow of the RNCM in 1993.

Wright was married in 1961 and had two sons.

She died in 2020.
