= The Bonny =

Studio album by Gerry Cinnamon
- Released: 17 April 2020
- Recorded: 2019
- Length: 41:52
- Label: Little Runaway

Gerry Cinnamon chronology
Erratic Cinematic (2017)	The Bonny (2020)

Singles from The Bonny
- 1. "Canter" Released: 22 June 2019; 2. "Sun Queen" Released: 11 October 2019; 3. "Dark Days" Released: 1 November 2019; 4. "The Bonny" Released: 29 November 2019; 5. "Where We're Going" Released: 21 February 2020; 6. "Head in the Clouds" Released: 13 April 2020

The Bonny is the second studio album by the Scottish singer-songwriter and acoustic guitarist Gerry Cinnamon. It was released on 17 April 2020 by Little Runaway Records. The album includes the singles "Canter", "Sun Queen", "Dark Days", "The Bonny", "Where We're Going" and "Head in the Clouds". The re-release also includes the single "Ghost".

== Background ==
In March 2020, Gerry Cinnamon announced that he was releasing his new album The Bonny on 17 April, during the COVID-19 pandemic in Scotland. In November 2020, Cinnamon announced via Instagram that the album was to be re-released on 13 November 2020 including his new single "Ghost", as well as new recordings of "Kampfire Vampire" and "Fickle McSelfish".

Of the re-release, he said: "Been waiting a long time to get those tunes back. Should have been on the first album but that’s what happens when you trust the wrong people. Ghost, Kampfire, Fickle and Roll the Credits were all written around the same time so it’s good to have them all on the same record."

== Chart performance ==
The Bonny debuted at number 1 on the UK Albums Chart, selling 29,000 units in its first week, 77% of which were made up of physical sales and downloads. It is Cinnamon's first ever chart-topping album in the United Kingdom. The album also sold 6,400 copies on vinyl format in its first week in the UK. The album also debuted at number 1 on the Irish Albums Chart.

== Promotion ==
=== Tour ===
On 6 December 2019, Gerry Cinnamon announced his UK and Ireland tour on his social media profiles. In March 2020, he had to reschedule some of his concerts to later in the year due to the coronavirus pandemic. On 21 May 2020, he announced that he had moved the dates for his UK and Ireland tour to May and June 2021.

Tour dates to promote The Bonny
UK and Ireland Tour
Date	City	Country	Venue	Attendance	Revenue
29 May 2021	Newcastle	England	This Is Tomorrow		
30 May 2021	Cardiff	Wales	Cardiff Castle		
1 June 2021	London	England	Alexandra Palace		
4 June 2021	Brighton	England	Brighton Centre		
5 June 2021	Manchester	England	Manchester Arena		
6 June 2021	Sheffield	England	FlyDSA Arena		
11 June 2021	Birmingham	England	Resorts World Arena		
18 June 2021	Cork	Ireland	Irish Independent Park		
19 June 2021	Belfast	Northern Ireland	Belsonic		
20 June 2021	Dublin	Ireland	Malahide Castle		
17 July 2021	Glasgow	Scotland	Hampden Park		

== Track listing ==
Original track listing
No.	Title	Length
1.	"Canter"	4:26
2.	"War Song Soldier"	4:28
3.	"Where We're Going"	4:00
4.	"Head in the Clouds"	3:53
5.	"Dark Days"	2:55
6.	"The Bonny"	2:56
7.	"Sun Queen"	4:07
8.	"Outsiders"	3:04
9.	"Roll the Credits"	3:22
10.	"Mayhem"	3:47
11.	"Six String Gun"	2:50
12.	"Every Man’s Truth"	2:04
Total length:		41:52

Re-release track listing
No.	Title	Length
1.	"Canter"	4:26
2.	"Kampfire Vampire"	3:55
3.	"War Song Soldier"	4:28
4.	"Where We're Going"	4:00
5.	"Head in the Clouds"	3:53
6.	"Dark Days"	2:55
7.	"The Bonny"	2:56
8.	"Sun Queen"	4:07
9.	"Outsiders"	3:04
10.	"Roll the Credits"	3:22
11.	"Ghost"	3:27
12.	"Mayhem"	3:47
13.	"Fickle McSelfish"	3:06
14.	"Six String Gun"	2:50
15.	"Every Man’s Truth"	2:04
Total length:		52:04

== Charts ==
=== Weekly charts ===
Weekly chart performance for The Bonny
Chart (2020)	Peak position
Australian Albums (ARIA)	70
Irish Albums (OCC)	1
Scottish Albums (OCC)	1
Swiss Albums (Schweizer Hitparade)	62
UK Albums (OCC)	1

=== Year-end charts ===
Year-end chart performance for The Bonny
Chart (2020)	Position
UK Albums (OCC)	45

== Certifications ==
Certifications for The Bonny
Region	Certification	Certified units/sales
United Kingdom (BPI)	Platinum	300,000^{‡}
^{‡} Sales+streaming figures based on certification alone.

== Release history ==
Release formats for The Bonny
Region	Date	Format	Label
United Kingdom	17 April 2020	Digital download; streaming	Little Runaway
United Kingdom	13 November 2020 (re-issue)	Digital download; streaming	Little Runaway
