= Medina House =

Building in Hove, England

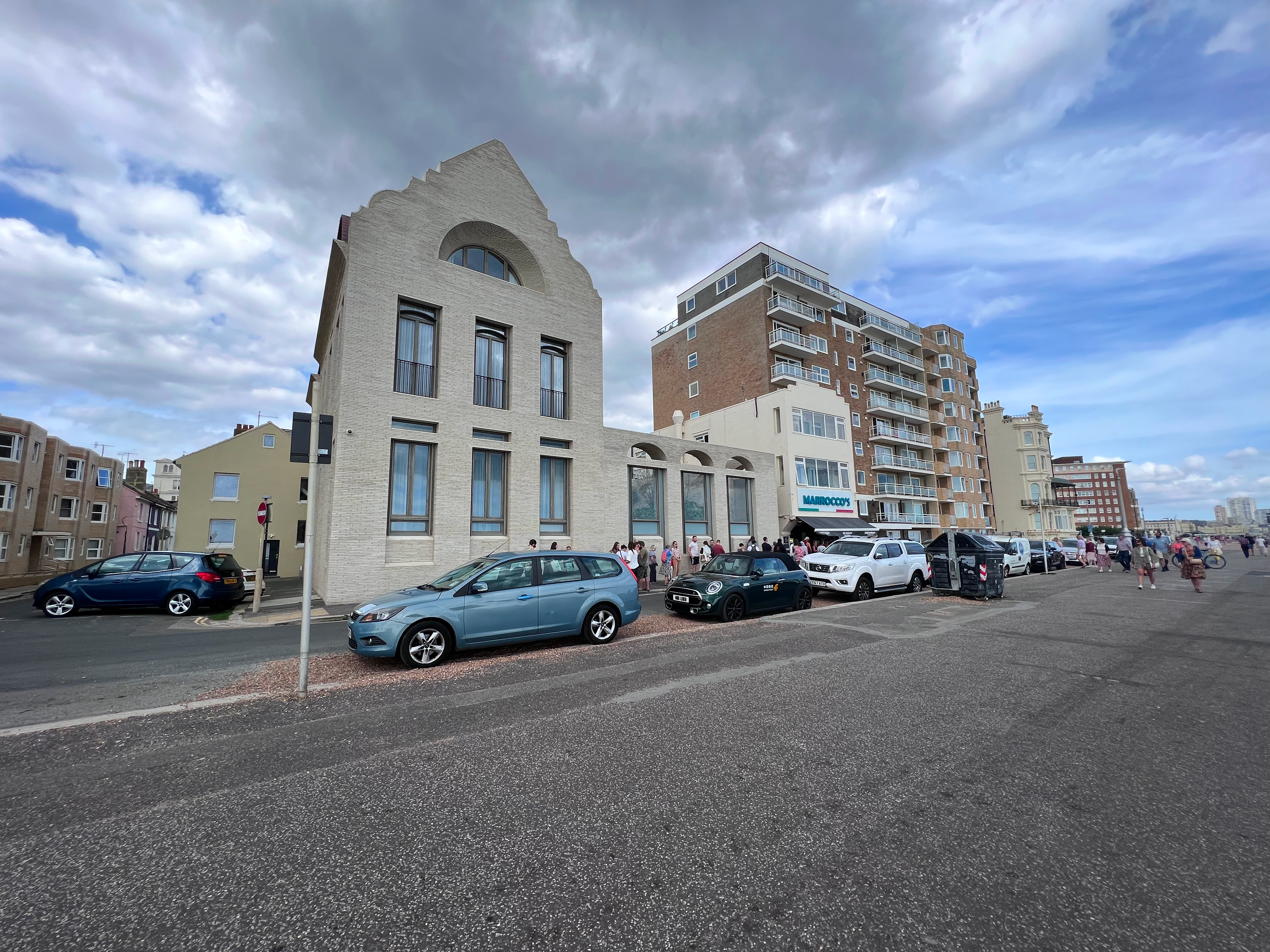
- Pictured in August 2022

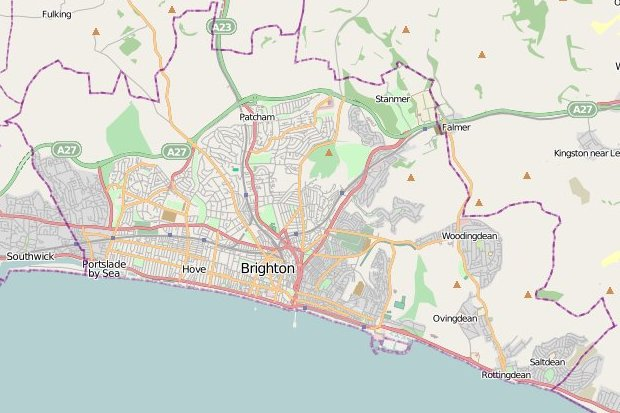
- Location within Brighton & Hove
- Former names: Medina Baths; Hove Baths

General information
- Status: Demolished
- Type: Bath-house
- Architectural style: Vernacular
- Location: Kings Esplanade, Hove BN3 2WA, Brighton and Hove, United Kingdom
- Coordinates: 50.8245°N 0.1763°W
- Current tenants: None
- Construction started: 1893
- Completed: 1894
- Opened: 13 September 1894
- Renovated: 1923
- Closed: Mid 1940s
- Demolished: 2018
- Cost: £2,000 (site)
- Renovation cost: £1,279
- Owner: Polly Samson, David Gilmour

Technical details
- Floor count: 3

Design and construction
- Architect: Paul B. Chambers

The original Medina House in Hove, Sussex, was the eastern of two seafront buildings, located on either side of Sussex Road, which together comprised Hove Baths, later to become more popularly known as the Medina Baths. The western building housed the men's baths, and the eastern building housed the women's baths.

Initially owned by the Hove Baths and Laundry Company Limited, the buildings were designed by local architect Paul B Chambers, and built between 1893 and 1894. Medina House was officially opened on 12 September 1894. Inside were the women's slipper and swimming baths. These complemented the larger Men's baths and the laundry, both of which were in the building to the west of Sussex Road. (Note: Although the Medina House Planning Brief states that the laundry was in Medina House, this is incorrect. The laundry, the first part of the baths project to be completed, was next to the men's baths, west of Sussex Road, as can clearly be seen in the (copyrighted) photograph of the laundry fire on 21 December 1909.) The baths closed in June 1916. In 1918 the baths were rented, then purchased, by Hove Council. Their intention was to repair the men's baths and re-open them as soon as possible, but there were no plans for the women's baths in Medina House, which fell into disuse, was occupied by squatters, and then partially re-used again, until it was finally demolished in April 2018.

During this period, Sirus Taghan, the then owner, agreed that the occupants could remain so long as the property was kept in the same condition as before occupation. The squatters were eventually evicted in September 2006, although the property was re-occupied for a week at the end of January 2007.

Taghan submitted several applications to demolish the building. However, these were all turned down by the council and also opposed by local residents. There was a fire in the building May 2013, and again in December 2014, after which the site became increasingly derelict. Novelist Polly Samson and her husband, guitarist David Gilmour, purchased the building in late 2015. It was demolished with the plan to build a new home for the couple on the site in 2018. The new building on the site was completed in 2021.

== History ==
Medina House was built in 1894 as the women's section of the Hove Baths (later, more popularly known as the Medina Baths). It provided a sea water swimming pool and slipper baths. Bathers were also able to access Victorian Turkish baths at the men's baths on Tuesdays and Thursdays from August 1908, when they opened, until some time around 1913, when they closed.

As part of Kings Esplanade, Medina House became part of the Cliftonville Conservation Area within Hove. Its listing describes it as a "Strange and whimsical building" that "Possesses some charm and character as well as historical significance."

During the Second World War it saw service as a makeshift hospital.

Previously owned by Hove Borough Council, it was at the end tenanted from the 1940s to 1994 by a firm of diamond cutters, Monnickendam, who tried to buy the premises from the council and were refused. Around the time that Hove Borough Council was merged with Brighton Council to form the Brighton and Hove unitary authority 1997–8, they instead sold it for circa £300,000 to Sirus Taghan.

=== 21st century ===
In 2001, the building was occupied by a group of artists known as the Chalk Circle who used the space for artist development, community workshops and exhibitions. Their aim was to create a 'free space' that the local community could use for whatever they thought most appropriate. Though initially the rent paid to the landlord was minimal (£1 per year) this was gradually increased to £20 per tenant per week. In the summer of 2006 the house became divided into drug addicts and non-addicts. Consequently, internal conflicts arose, most of the non-addicts left and the rent ceased to be collected. It was occupied until September 2006, when the residents were evicted due to non-payment of rent. The court ordered the eviction. The residents appealed against the decision but were eventually evicted. City councillors had been campaigning for four years due to local complaints about noise and rubbish.

In 2007, the building was briefly squatted for about two weeks. One morning, Elijah Smith opened the door to the fire brigade and police who escorted them. The police kicked electric sockets inside the building, causing them to become a fire hazard. Under this pretext the squatters were evicted and a fire prohibition order was then placed on the building.

=== Development ===
Following purchase in the late 1990s, Sirus Taghan obtained planning consent for a low-rise small development which would have seen Medina House demolished. Whilst the Royal Doulton-tiled main bath house area was part demolished and the pool filled in with concrete along the way, the consent was allowed to lapse and ideas of putting a tall building on the site have instead proliferated ever since (unsuccessfully).

One idea, for a 'spinning plates' tower, appeared on the front page of the local newspaper, The Argus. A local architect recognised it as having been inspired by a development in Scandinavia. No planning application was submitted to BHCC for this proposal.

Sirus Taghan has wanted to demolish Medina House and build a new tower block. He first put in a planning application for an 18-storey building in 2002, but this was rejected. Subsequently, he planned a smaller tower but never put in a formal application. Taghan's 2006 proposal for Sirus Tower, a 12-storey building which would house 25 flats, also failed to gain planning consent. Taghan claimed that the building is structurally unsound.

=== Enforcement notices ===
Following receipt of a letter from the Hove MP, Mike Weatherley, in January 2011, Brighton and Hove City Council opened an Enforcement file. A six-months s215 notice was raised in November 2011, a one-month extension granted soon after and the deadline of 1 June 2012 passed without compliance. At the time of writing a 2nd s215 notice was to be raised concerning refuse within the bath area and a letter was to be sent advising the owners of the council's position: prosecution and/or repairs by the council to be recharged to the owners and asking them what their position is.

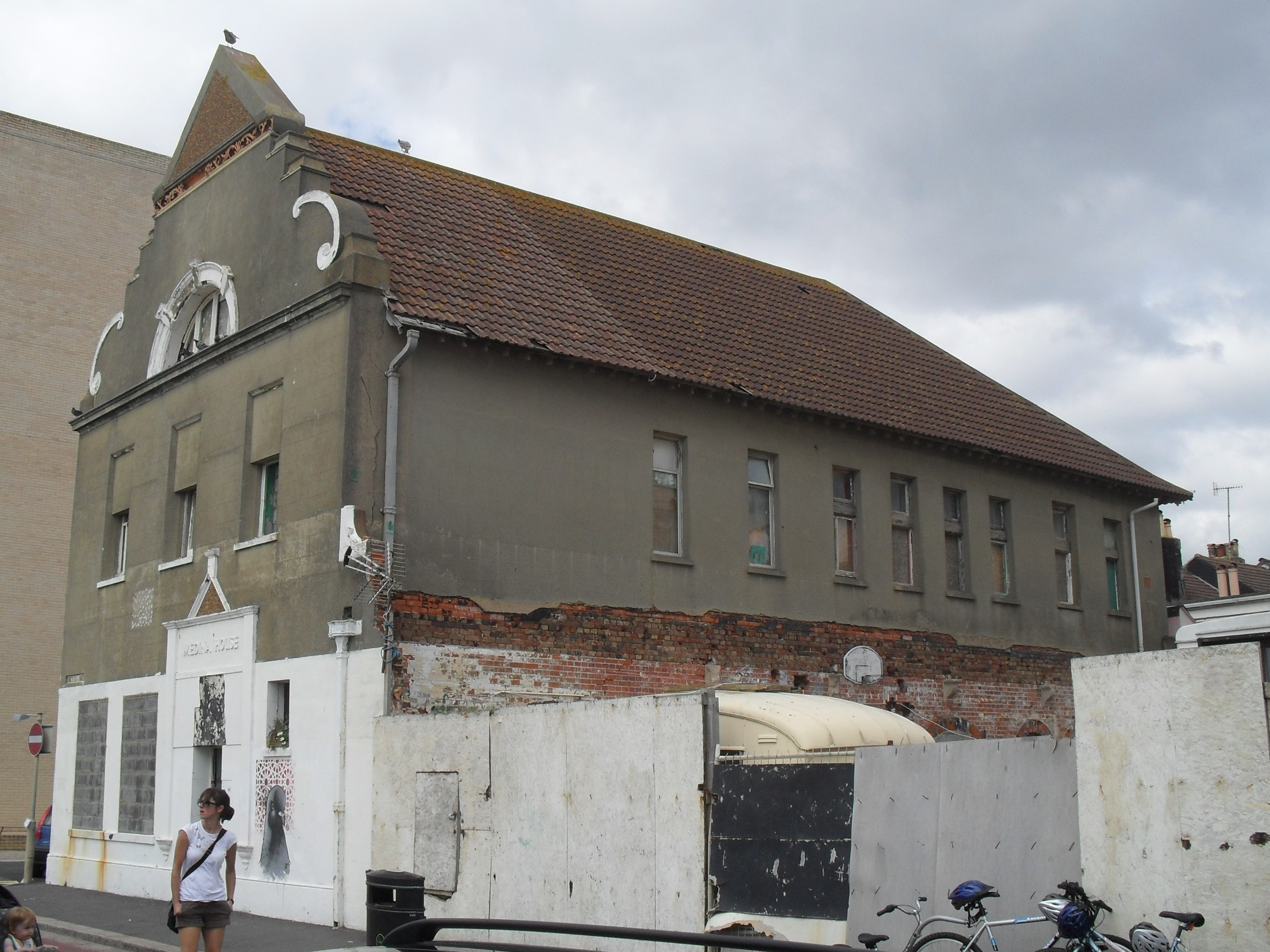
Medina House, 2010

=== Demolition ===
A fire occurred in the afternoon of Friday 31 May 2013. The cause is unclear. Another fire occurred in the evening of Saturday 20 December 2014. The initial assessment by the fire service was that the cause was arson.

The novelist Polly Samson and the guitarist David Gilmour, a couple, purchased the building in late 2015. After the fires, view of the surveyors was that Medina House was damaged beyond repair. A plan to erect a new structure which echoes the old one was approved. The Victorian building was demolished in April 2018.

== Gallery ==
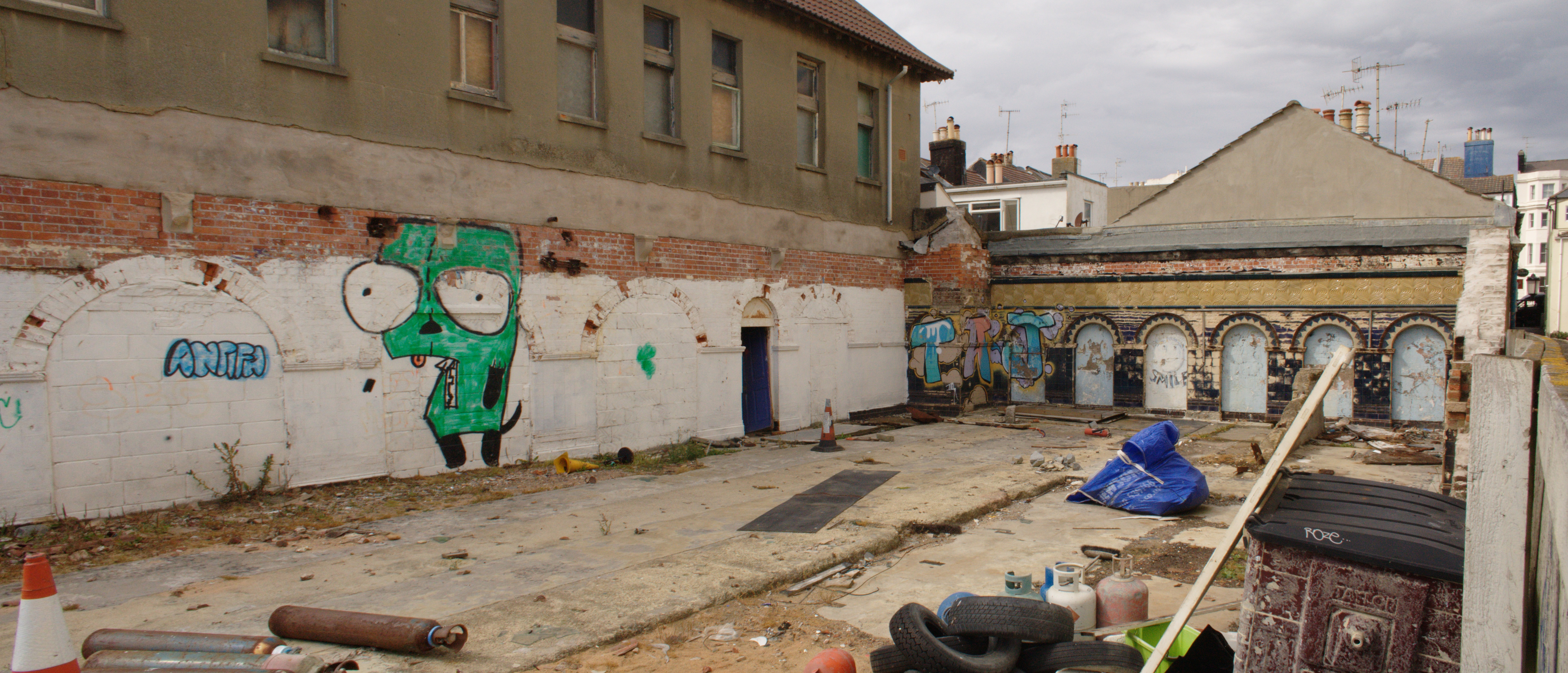
Swimming pool site 2002

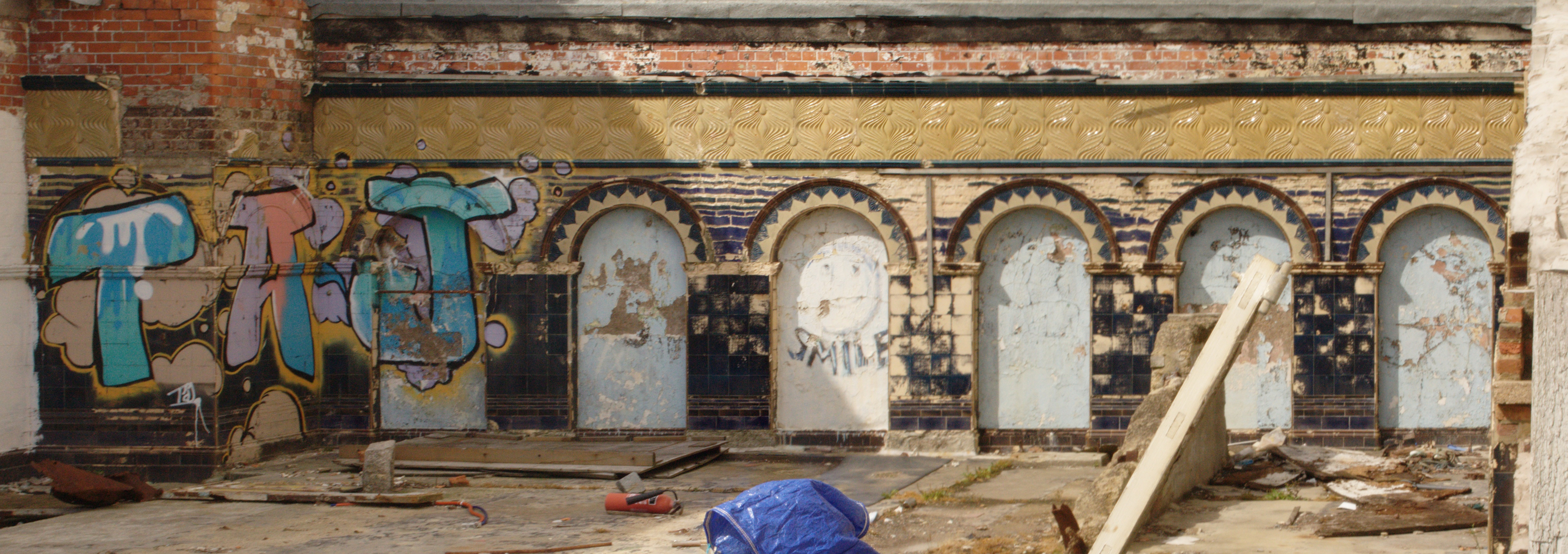
Swimming pool decorated wall, 2002

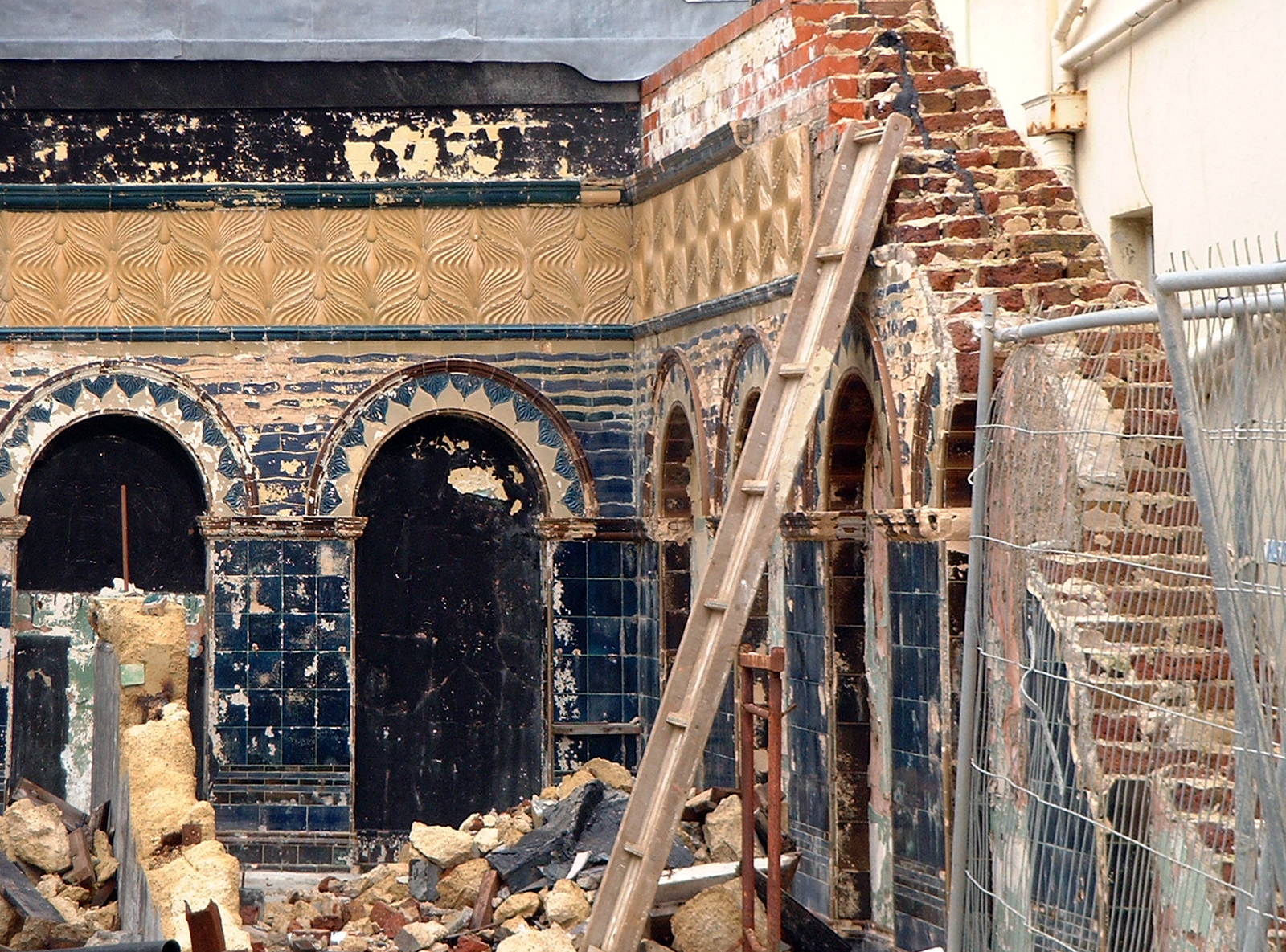
Swimming pool detail showing decoration, 2002

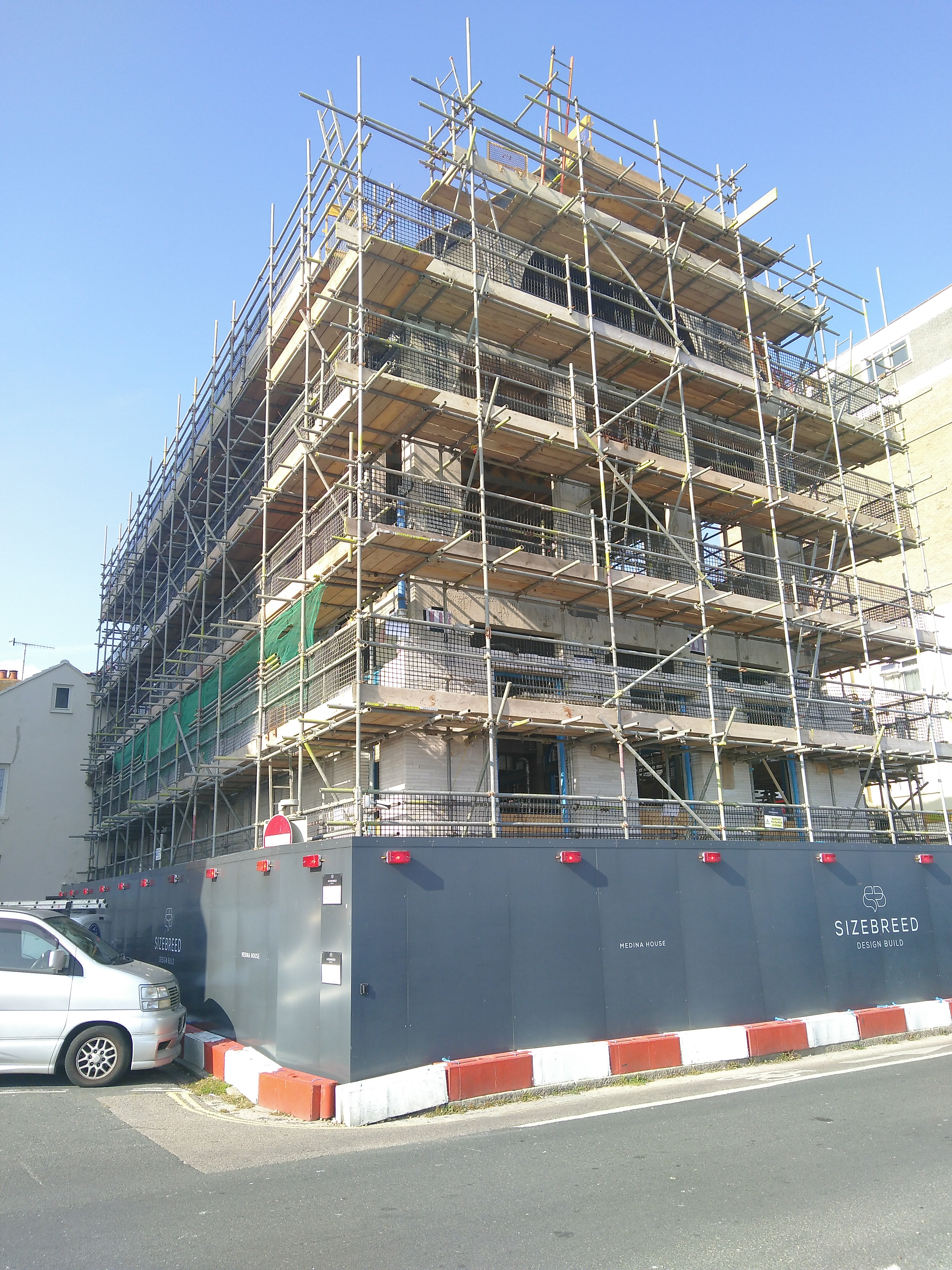
Rebuilding, 2019

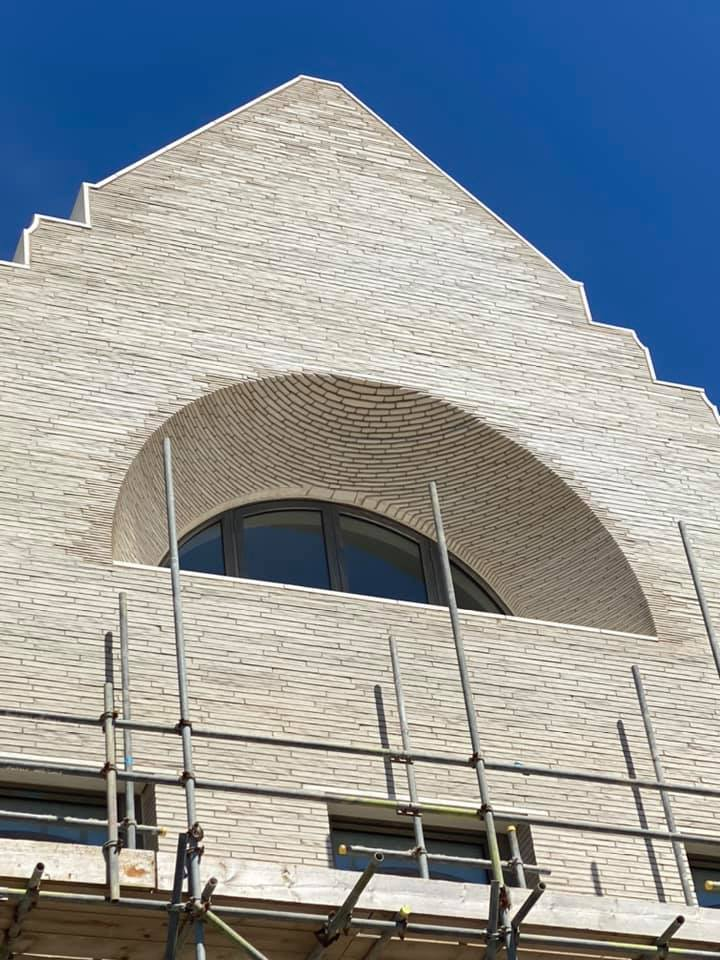
With the roof line of the re constructed Medina House now completed, it exposes the new gable.

== Bibliography ==
- Middleton, Judy (2003). The Encyclopaedia of Hove & Portslade. Brighton: Brighton & Hove Libraries.
