= Roger Quigley =

English singer-songwriter (1969–2020)

Roger Patrick Martin Quigley (17 March 1969 – 18 August 2020) was an English singer-songwriter and former drummer from Manchester, England, and one-half of the indie pop duo known as The Montgolfier Brothers.

Roger Quigley was born in Salford and studied fine arts at the University of Sunderland.

He released multiple recordings, including two LPs — 1969 Till God Knows When and Quigley's Point. The latter was recorded as 'At Swim Two Birds', the name taken from the book of the same name by the Irish novelist Flann O'Brien.

Quigley died suddenly on 18 August 2020.

The Montgolfier Brothers' song "Between Two Points" was written by Quigley and bandmate Mark Tranmer, and issued as a single from their album Seventeen Stars. It was covered by David Gilmour of Pink Floyd on his 2024 album Luck and Strange. When he heard it and demoed it, Gilmour assumed the song was well known. In May 2024, shortly before Gilmour's album was released, the Montgolfier Brothers' original version of "Between Two Points" had received only 25,000 plays on Spotify.
