= Scottish Album of the Year Award =

Music award in Scotland

The Scottish Album of the Year (SAY) Award
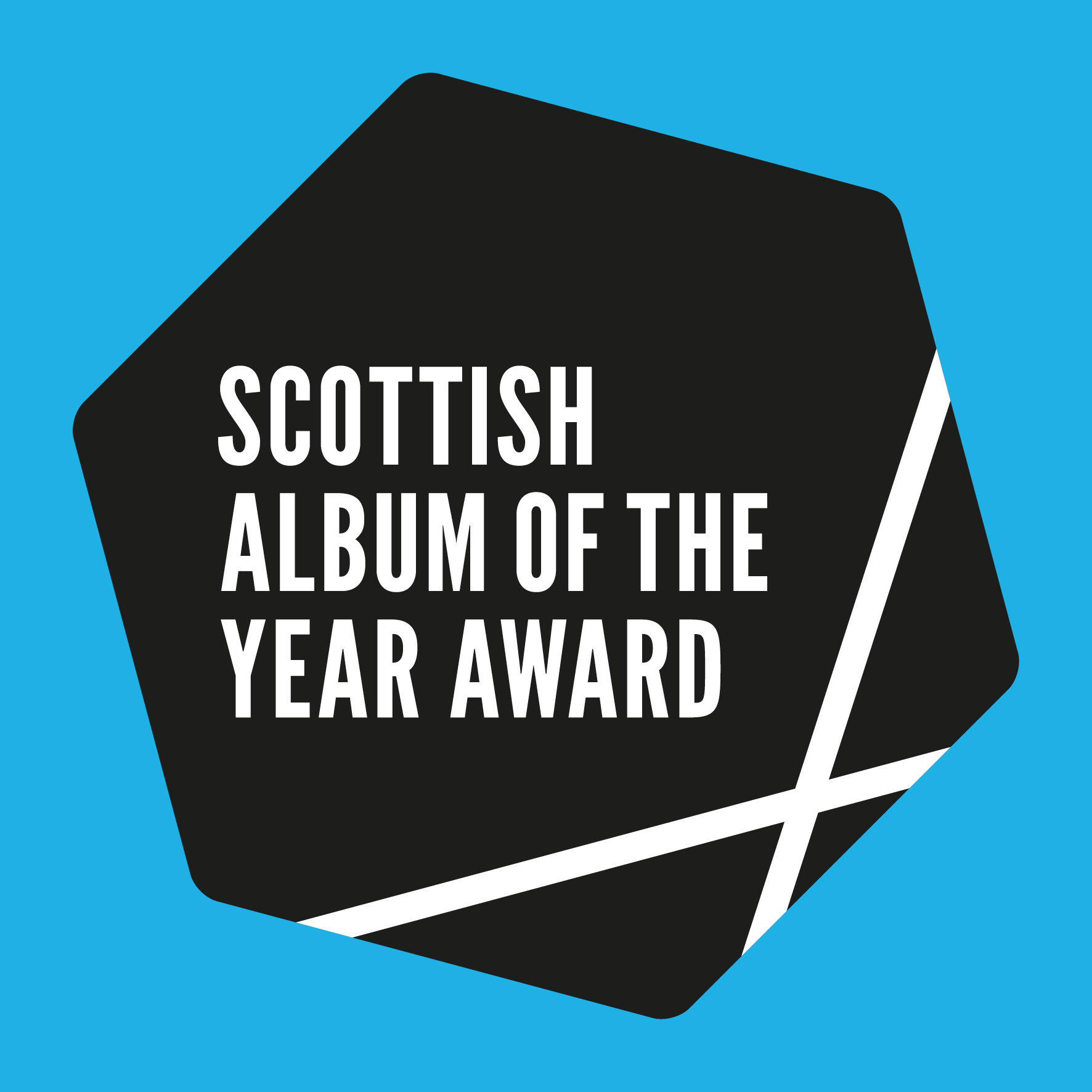
- SAY Award Logo
- Awarded for: Best album by a Scottish artist
- Location: Scotland
- First award: 2012
- Website: www.sayaward.com

The Scottish Album of the Year (SAY) Award is an award given annually for an outstanding album produced by a Scottish artist. The award was launched in 2012 by the Scottish Music Industry Association (SMIA) in partnership with Creative Scotland. The winner receives a £20,000 prize and the nine shortlisted artists receive £1,000.

The award ceremony is set to be hosted in Dundee up until 2027.

== Process ==
Once all eligible albums have been collated, 100 impartial 'Nominators', chosen from sectors including journalism, broadcast and radio, music retail and live music venues, will consider the titles from The SAY Award's Eligible Albums list, nominating their five favourite albums and ranking them in order of preference. 'Nominators' include specialists in a variety of genres, such as jazz, classical, electronic and traditional folk, as well as key influencers from elsewhere in the arts, and cannot have a commercial interest in any of the albums being discussed. The SMIA assigns a score to each title in a Nominator's Top 5, before announcing the 20 highest scoring albums as The SAY Award Longlist.

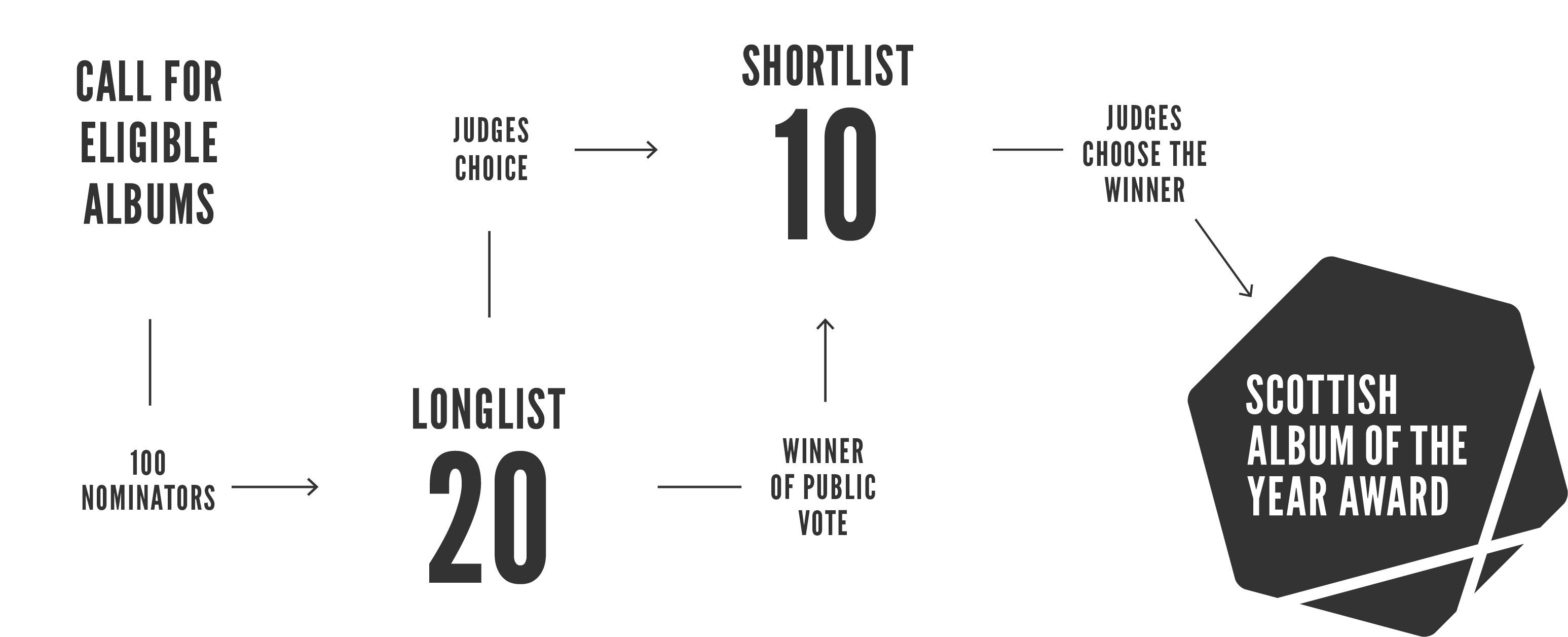

The Longlist is then whittled down to a Shortlist of 10 albums, one of which will be chosen by music fans via an online public vote and the others decided by the SAY Award judging panel. Previous judges have included the composer Craig Armstrong, Turner Prize-winning artists Douglas Gordon and Susan Philipsz, filmmaker Lynne Ramsay, music editor of The Skinny Tallah Brash, DJ and promoter Sarra Wild, Edinburgh International Festival director Fergus Linehan, Sub Club partner/director Barry Price, and Scottish Ballet's Sophie Laplane.

The SAY Award Shortlist is then honoured at an exclusive ceremony, with each title receiving an award created by The SAY Award Design Commission winner and a minimum of £1,000. The SAY Award judging panel reconvene for the ceremony and decide who picks up the £20,000 first prize and coveted title of Scottish Album of the Year.

== Host cities and venues ==
Years	Host city	Venue
2012–2015	Glasgow	Glasgow Film City (2012); Barrowlands (2013–2014); O2 ABC (2015)
2016–2018	Paisley	Paisley Town Hall
2019–2021	Edinburgh	Assembly Rooms (2019); Summerhall (2020); Usher Hall (2021)
2022–2024	Stirling	Albert Halls
2025–2027	Dundee	Caird Hall

== Winners and finalists ==
Year	Winner	Shortlist	Longlist	Ref.
2012	Bill Wells and Aidan Moffat – Everything's Getting Older	Conquering Animal Sound – Kammerspiel; Happy Particles – Under Sleeping Waves; King Creosote & Jon Hopkins – Diamond Mine; Mogwai – Hardcore Will Never Die, But You Will; Mungo's Hi Fi – Forward Ever; Remember Remember – The Quickening; Rustie – Glass Swords; Tommy Smith – Karma; Twin Atlantic – Free	6th Borough Project – One Night in the Borough; Bwani Junction – Fully Cocked; Chris Stout – Brazilian Theory; Found – factorycraft; Fudge Fingas – Now About How; Jonny – Jonny; Muscles of Joy – Muscles of Joy; Richard Craig – Inward; Steve Mason & Dennis Bovell – Ghosts Outside; We Were Promised Jetpacks – In the Pit of the Stomach	
2013	RM Hubbert – Thirteen Lost & Found	Admiral Fallow – Tree Bursts in Snow; Django Django – Django Django; Human Don't Be Angry – Human Don't Be Angry; Karine Polwart – Traces; Lau – Race the Loser; Meursault – Something for the Weakened; Paul Buchanan – Mid-Air; Stanley Odd – Reject; The Twilight Sad – No One Can Ever Know	Auntie Flo – Future Rhythm Machine; Calvin Harris – 18 Months; Dam Mantle – Brothers Fowl; Duncan Chisholm – Affric; Emeli Sandé – Our Version of Events; Errors – Have Some Faith in Magic; Konrad Wiszniewski & Euan Stevenson – New Focus; Miaoux Miaoux – Light of the North; Paws – Cokefloat!; The Unwinding Hours – Afterlives	
2014	Young Fathers – Tape Two	Biffy Clyro – Opposites; Boards of Canada – Tomorrow's Harvest; Chvrches – The Bones of What You Believe; Edwyn Collins – Understated; Hector Bizerk – Nobody Seen Nothing; RM Hubbert – Breaks & Bone; Steve Mason – Monkey Minds in the Devil's Time; Mogwai – Les Revenants; The Pastels – Slow Summits	Adam Holmes – Heirs and Graces; Adam Stafford – Imaginary Walls Collapse; Camera Obscura – Desire Lines; Dunedin Consort – J.S. Bach: Six Brandenburg Concertos; Frightened Rabbit – Pedestrian Verse; Kid Canaveral – Now That You Are a Dancer; Rick Redbeard – No Selfish Heart; Roddy Hart & The Lonesome Fire – Roddy Hart & The Lonesome Fire; Scottish Chamber Orchestra – Berlioz: Les Nuit D'été; Scottish National Jazz Orchestra – In the Spirit of Duke	
2015	Kathryn Joseph – Bones You Have Thrown Me, and Blood I've Spilled.	Belle & Sebastian – Girls in Peacetime Want to Dance; Errors – Lease of Life; Happy Meals – Apero; Honeyblood – Honeyblood; Paolo Nutini – Caustic Love; Paws – Youth Culture Forever; Slam – Reverse Proceed; The Amazing Snakeheads – Amphetamine Ballads; Young Fathers – Dead	Blue Rose Code – The Ballads of Peckham Rye; Fatherson – I Am an Island; Idlewild – Everything Ever Written; King Creosote – From Scotland with Love; Mike Vass – In the Wake of Neil Gunn; Mogwai – Rave Tapes; The Phantom Band – Strange Friend; The Twilight Sad – Nobody Wants to Be Here and Nobody Wants to Leave; Treacherous Orchestra – Grind; Withered Hand – New Gods	
2016	Anna Meredith – Varmints	Auntie Flo – Theory of Flo; C Duncan – Architect; Chvrches – Every Open Eye; Emma Pollock – In Search of Harperfield; FFS – FFS; Lau – The Bell That Never Rang; Steve Mason – Meet the Humans; The Revenge – Love That Will Not Die; Young Fathers – White Men Are Black Men Too	Admiral Fallow – Tiny Rewards; Django Django – Born Under Saturn; Dunedin Consort – Bach Magnificat; Hector Bizerk – The Waltz of Modern Psychiatry; Hudson Mohawke – Lantern; Iain Morrison – Eas; Jarlath Henderson – Hearts Broken, Heads Turned; Miaoux Miaoux – School of Velocity; Primal Scream – Chaosmosis; Rachel Sermanni – Tied to the Moon	
2017	Sacred Paws – Strike a Match	C Duncan – The Midnight Sun; Ela Orleans – Circles of Upper and Lower Hell; Honeyblood – Babes Never Die; Konx-Om-Pax – Caramel; Meursault – I Will Kill Again; Mogwai – Atomic; Pictish Trail – Future Echoes; Rachel Newton – Here's My Heart Come Take It	Adam Holmes and The Embers – Brighter Still; Frightened Rabbit – Painting of a Panic Attack; Fatherson – Open Book; King Creosote – Astronaut Meets Appleman; Modern Studies – Swell to Great; Starless – Starless; Teenage Fanclub – Here; TeenCanteen – Say It All With a Kiss; The Jesus and Mary Chain – Damage and Joy; Vukovi – Vukovi	
2018	Young Fathers – Cocoa Sugar	Babe – Kiss & Tell; Best Girl Athlete – Best Girl Athlete; Franz Ferdinand – Always Ascending; Golden Teacher – No Luscious Life; Karine Polwart with Pippa Murphy – A Pocket of Wind Resistance; Kobi Onyame – Gold; Mogwai – Every Country's Sun; Out Lines – Conflats; Siobhan Wilson – There Are No Saints	Adam Holmes and the Embers – Midnight Milk; Blue Rose Code – The Water of Leith; Catholic Action – In Memory Of; Chris Stout & Catriona McKay – Bare Knuckle; Elephant Sessions – All We Have Is Now; Happy Meals – Full Ashram Devotional Ceremony (Volumes IV – VI); Martha Ffion – Sunday Best; Neon Waltz – Strange Hymns; Pronto Mama – Any Joy; The Spook School – Could It Be Different?	
2019	Auntie Flo – Radio Highlife	Aidan Moffat and RM Hubbert – Here Lies the Body; Andrew Wasylyk – The Paralian; C Duncan – Health; Carla J. Easton – Impossible Stuff; Fergus McCreadie Trio – Turas; Free Love – Luxury Hits; Karine Polwart with Steven Polwart and Inge Thomson – Laws of Motion; Kathryn Joseph – From When I Wake the Want Is; Mastersystem – Dance Music	Aidan O'Rourke – 365: Volume One; Brìghde Chaimbeul – The Reeling; Chvrches – Love Is Dead; Edwyn Collins – Badbea; Fatherson – Sum of All Your Parts; Graham Costello's Strata – Obelisk; Kinnaris Quintet – Free One; Niteworks – Air Fàir An Là; Sean Shibe – softLOUD; The Twilight Sad – It Won/t Be Like This All the Time	
2020	Nova – Re-Up	Blanck Mass – Animated Violence Mild; Bossy Love – Me + U; Callum Easter – Here or Nowhere; Cloth – Cloth; Comfort – Not Passing; Declan Welsh and the Decadent West – Cheaply Bought, Expensively Sold; Erland Cooper – Sule Skerry; The Ninth Wave – Infancy; SHHE – SHHE	Anna Meredith – Fibs; Elephant Sessions – What Makes You; Fat-Suit – Waifs & Strays; Free Love – Extreme Dance Anthems; Honeyblood – In Plain Sight; Karine Polwart – Karine Polwart's Scottish Songbook; Lewis Capaldi – Divinely Uninspired to a Hellish Extent; Mezcla – Shoot the Moon; Sacred Paws – Run Around the Sun; Vistas – Everything Changes in the End	
2021	Mogwai – As the Love Continues	AiiTee – Love Don't Fall; Arab Strap – As Days Get Dark; Biffy Clyro – A Celebration of Endings; Joesef – Does It Make You Feel Good?; Lizzie Reid – Cubicle; Rachel Newton – To the Awe; Stanley Odd – Stay Odd: The Magic of Everyday Things; The Ninth Wave – Happy Days!; The Snuts – W.L.	Andrew Wasylyk – Fugitive Light and Themes of Consolation; Bemz – Saint of Lost Causes; Carla J. Easton – Weirdo; Erland Cooper – Landform ft. Marta Salogni; Fergus McCreadie – Cairn; Jenny Sturgeon – The Living Mountain; Kubler-Ross – Kubler-Ross; Matt Carmichael – Where Will the River Flow?; Paul Towndrow – Deepening the River; Taahliah – Angelica	
2022	Fergus McCreadie – Forest Floor	AiiTee – Better Days; Constant Follower – Neither Is, Nor Ever Was; Hamish Hawk – Heavy Elevator; Hen Hoose – Equaliser; Kathryn Joseph – For You Who Are the Wronged; Kobi Onyame – Don't Drink the Poison; Niteworks – A'Ghrian; Proc Fiskal – Siren Spine Sysex; Walt Disco – Unlearning	Andrew Wasylyk – Balgay Hill: Morning in Magnolia; Annie Booth – Lazybody; Bemz – M4; C Duncan – Alluvium; Callum Easter – System; Declan Welsh and the Decadent West – It's Been a Year; Duncan Lyall – Milestone; The Ninth Wave – Heavy Like a Headache; Rebecca Vasmant – With Love, From Glasgow; Seonaid Aitken Ensemble – Chasing Sakura	
2023	Young Fathers – Heavy Heavy	Andrew Wasylyk – Hearing the Water Before Seeing the Falls; Becky Sikasa – Twelve Wooden Boxes; Bemz – Nova's Dad; Brìghde Chaimbeul – Carry Them With Us; Brooke Combe – Black Is the New Gold; Cloth – Secret Measure; Hamish Hawk – Angel Numbers; Joesef – Permanent Damage; Paolo Nutini – Last Night in the Bittersweet	Brownbear – Demons; Comfort – What's Bad Enough?; Eyes of Others – Eyes of Others; Free Love – Inside; Juliette Lemoine – Soaring; Kapil Seshasayee – Laal; Lvra – Soft Like Steel; Scott William Urquhart & Constant Follower – Even Days Dissolve; Su-a Lee – Dialogues; The Snuts – Burn the Empire	
2024	Redolent – Dinny Greet	Arab Strap – I'm Totally Fine with It Don't Give a Fuck Anymore; Barry Can't Swim – When Will We Land?; Becky Sikasa – The Writings and the Pictures and the Song; Corto.alto – Bad With Names; Dead Pony – Ignore This; Kathryn Williams & Withered Hand – Willson Williams; Lucia & the Best Boys – Burning Castles; Rachel Sermanni – Dreamer Awake; Theo Bleak – Pain	Afterlands – We Are the Animals in the Night; Amy Laurenson – Strands; Bee Asha – Goodbye, Gracious; Blue Rose Code – Bright Circumstance; Broken Chanter – Chorus of Doubt; Empire State Bastard – Rivers of Heresy; Fergus McCreadie – Stream; Malin Lewis – Halocline; Mama Terra – The Summoned; The Snuts – Millennials	
2025	Kai Reesu – Kompromat Vol. I	Brooke Combe – Dancing at the Edge of the World; Cloth – Pink Silence; Hamish Hawk – A Firmer Hand; Jacob Alon – In Limerence; Kathryn Joseph – We Were Made Prey; Matt Carmichael – Dancing with Embers; Taahliah – Gramarye; The Joy Hotel – Ceremony; Zoe Graham – Tent	Andrew Wasylyk and Tommy Perman – Ash Grey and the Gull Glides On; Be Charlotte – Self Help and Fictional Doubts; Constant Follower – The Smile You Send Out Returns to You; corto.alto – 30/108; Faith Eliott – Dryas; Kitti – Somethin' in the Water; Maranta – Day Long Dream; Mogwai – The Bad Fire; Rebecca Vasmant – Who We Are, Becoming; Walt Disco – The Warping	
2026	Vagrant Real Estate – Neither Collar Nor Crown	Barry Can't Swim – Loner; Boards of Canada – Inferno; Brìghde Chaimbeul – Sunwise; Heir of the Cursed – Heir of the Cursed; Hen Hoose Collective – The Twelve; Michael McGovern – Thin White Road; Sonedo – From Here on Out; Swim School – Swim School; Vlure – Escalate	Admiral Fallow – First of the Birds; Andrew Wasylyk – Irreparable Parables; Biffy Clyro – Futique; Brogeal – Tuesday Paper Club; Emma Pollock – Begging the Night to Take Hold; Fergus McCreadie – The Shieling; Pippa Blundell – Common Thread; Sian – Araon; The Twilight Sad – It's the Long Goodbye; Valtos – The Last Light	
