= Cocoa Sugar =

Studio album by Young Fathers
- Released: 9 March 2018
- Genre: Garage rap; indietronica; neo-soul
- Length: 36:45
- Label: Ninja Tune

Young Fathers chronology
White Men Are Black Men Too (2015)	Cocoa Sugar (2018)	Heavy Heavy (2023)

Singles from Cocoa Sugar
- 1. "Lord" Released: 31 October 2017; 2. "In My View" Released: 17 January 2018; 3. "Toy" Released: 28 February 2018

Cocoa Sugar is the third studio album by Scottish indie group Young Fathers. It was released on Ninja Tune on 9 March 2018. It won the Scottish Album of the Year Award for 2018. It peaked at number 28 on the UK Albums Chart.

== Artwork ==
The album art, designed by Tom Hingston and photographed by Julia Noni, features band member Alloysious Massaquoi and is a direct homage to the Waldemar Świerzy's Polish poster for the 1969 drama film Midnight Cowboy.

== Critical reception ==
Professional ratings
Aggregate scores
Source	Rating
AnyDecentMusic?	8.2/10
Metacritic	87/100
Review scores
Source	Rating
AllMusic	4/5 stars
The A.V. Club	B+
The Guardian	4/5 stars
The Independent	4/5 stars
Mojo	4/5 stars
NME	4/5 stars
The Observer	5/5 stars
Pitchfork	7.3/10
Q	4/5 stars
Uncut	8/10

At Metacritic, which assigns a weighted average score out of 100 to reviews from mainstream critics, the album received an average score of 87, based on 21 reviews, indicating "universal acclaim".

Clayton Purdom of The A.V. Club described the album as "a worthy progression, a tight stretch of otherworldly melodies, ramshackle percussion, and buzzing clouds of woozy ambient sound."

=== Accolades ===
Publication	Accolade	Rank	Ref.
NME	Albums of the Year 2018	24	
PopMatters	70 Best Albums of 2018	1	
The Skinny	50 Best Albums of 2018	1	
Stereogum	50 Best Albums of 2018	40	

== Track listing ==
All tracks are written by Kayus Bankole, Timothy London, Graham "G" Hastings and Alloysious Massaquoi, except where noted

No.	Title	Writer(s)	Length
1.	"See How"		2:01
2.	"Fee Fi"		2:41
3.	"In My View"		3:15
4.	"Turn"	Kayus Bankole; Graham "G" Hastings; Alloysious Massaquoi; Dave Sitek	3:36
5.	"Lord"		3:34
6.	"Tremolo"		3:08
7.	"Wow"		4:00
8.	"Border Girl"		4:01
9.	"Holy Ghost"		2:32
10.	"Wire"		1:40
11.	"Toy"		3:13
12.	"Picking You"	Kayus Bankole; Graham "G" Hastings; Alloysious Massaquoi; Dave Sitek	3:04
Total length:			36:45

Japanese edition bonus tracks
No.	Title	Length
13.	"Just a Kid"	3:01
14.	"Out of My Mind Sometimes"	2:04
Total length:		41:50

== Personnel ==
- David Cousin – additional vocals (track 12)
- Timothy London – co-producer
- Graham "G" Hastings – mixing (tracks 1–4, 6–12)
- Laurie Ross – mixing (tracks 1–4, 6–12)
- Ben Baptie – mixing (track 5)
- Vlado Meller – mastering
- Hingston Studio – design and art direction
- Julia Noni – photography

== Charts ==
Chart (2018)	Peak position
Belgian Albums (Ultratop Flanders)	37
UK Albums (OCC)	28
UK Independent Albums (OCC)	4
UK R&B Albums (OCC)	1
Belgian Albums (Ultratop Wallonia)	173
