= The Great Western Road (album) =

Studio album by Deacon Blue
- Released: March 21, 2025
- Studio: Rockfield, Wales
- Length: 46:44
- Label: Cooking Vinyl
- Producer: Ricky Ross; Gregor Philp

Deacon Blue chronology
| Riding on the Tide of Love (2021) | The Great Western Road (2025) |

Singles from The Great Western Road
- 1. "Late '88" Released: 29 November 2024

The Great Western Road is the eleventh studio album by Scottish band Deacon Blue, released by Cooking Vinyl on 21 March 2025. The album was preceded by the release of its lead single, "Late 88", released on 29 November 2024. The album serves as the last album which features keyboard player James Prime, following his death from cancer on 19 June 2025.

== Background and recording ==
The album follows the release of their tenth studio album, Riding on the Tide of Love (2021), which continued their commercial success since their reunion in 2012. The album was formally announced by the band in November 2024 with a release in March 2025. In an interview with BBC Radio 2, lead singer Ricky Ross stated that The Great Western Road takes its name from the Great Western Road in Glasgow, stating that the Glasgow road "leads from the city centre through the West End of Glasgow - which is a really cool and trendy part - and I always thought that for a certain time we owned that. It was the place we wanted to be and we seemed part of it for about two months in 1987". The lead single to be released from the album, "Late 88", premiered on BBC Radio 2 with Zoe Ball on 26 November 2024.

The release of The Great Western Road marks the 40th anniversary of the bands formation following Ricky Ross and Dougie Vipond meeting for the first time and eventually establishing Deacon Blue as a band. Lyrically, the album "reflects the journey the band has taken and remain honest to the age and experiences they have shared", with lead singer Ricky Ross stating that the album is "just the next part of the adventure and it’s as exciting now as it was back in 1988".

The album was recorded at Rockfield Studios in Wales. Ross and the group's guitarist Gregor Philp shared production duties on The Great Western Road, with engineer Matt Butler previously collaborating with the band on their debut studio album, Raintown (1987).

== Release and promotion ==
The album was released on 21 March 2025 via Cooking Vinyl. To promote the release of the album, the band released the lead single, "Late 88" on 29 November 2024, receiving its first airplay in the United Kingdom on BBC Radio 2 on 26 November 2024, three days prior to the singles official release. To promote the album further, the band are scheduled to embark on an arena tour of the United Kingdom and the Republic of Ireland entitled The Great Western Road Trip. The tour is set to begin on 31 March 2025 in Bradford, England, and includes the first date for the band at the Wembley Arena in London since 1990. The tour will conclude in October 2025 with two homecoming shows at the OVO Hydro in Glasgow, Scotland.

== Commercial performance ==
The album debuted at number one on the Scottish Albums Chart, number three on the UK Albums Chart and number two on the UK Independent Albums Chart. It became their highest charting album in the United Kingdom since 1991's Fellow Hoodlums, and their seventh UK Top 10 album overall.

== Track listing ==
The Great Western Road track listing
| No. | Title | Writer(s) | Length |
|---|---|---|---|
| 1. | "Great Western Road" | Ricky Ross | 4:48 |
| 2. | "Late '88" | Gregor Philp; Ross | 4:10 |
| 3. | "People Come First" | Ross | 3:46 |
| 4. | "Wait on Me" | Philp; Ross | 3:30 |
| 5. | "Ashore" | Philp; Ross | 3:56 |
| 6. | "Underneath the Stars" | Lorraine McIntosh; Ross | 4:10 |
| 7. | "Up Hope" | Philp; Ross | 2:56 |
| 8. | "Turn Up Your Radio!" | Ross | 3:41 |
| 9. | "How We Remember It" | Ross | 4:02 |
| 10. | "Mid Century Modern" | Ross | 4:15 |
| 11. | "Curve of the Line" | Ross | 4:38 |
| 12. | "If I Lived on My Own" | Ross | 2:48 |
| Total length: | | | 46:44 |

== Personnel ==
=== Deacon Blue ===
- Ricky Ross – vocals, Wurlitzer, piano, clapping, production
- Lorraine McIntosh – vocals, tambourine, shaker, clapping
- James Prime – piano, Hammond C3, keyboards, vocals, clapping, string arrangement on "Late '88"
- Dougie Vipond – drums, percussion, vocals, clapping
- Gregor Philp – acoustic and electric guitars, keyboards, vocals, clapping, production
- Lewis Gordon – bass guitar, vocals, clapping

=== Additional contributors ===
- Ash Howes – additional programming, additional mixing
- Robin Sutherland – mastering
- Matt Butler – recording
- Sarah McLeod – strings and brass recording
- The Pumpkin Seeds – strings
  - Pete Harvey – string arrangements, cello
  - Kate Miguda – violin
  - Claire Telford – violin
  - Kirsty Orton – violin
  - Gisela Hans – violin
  - Marsailidh Groat – viola
  - Sarah Leonard – viola
  - Patsy Reid – viola
- Liam Shortall – brass scoring, trombone
- Michael Butcher – alto saxophone
- Mateusz Sobiesky – tenor saxophone
- Matt Gough – trumpet, flugelhorn
- DB Studio – sleeve design
- Niall McMenamin – album cover
- Paul Kelly – album cover
- Johnny Bell – album cover

== Charts ==
Chart performance for The Great Western Road
| Chart (2025) | Peak position |
|---|---|
| Scottish Albums (OCC) | 1 |
| UK Albums (OCC) | 3 |
| UK Independent Albums (OCC) | 2 |
