= Normal Fears =

Studio album by Fatherson
- Released: April 22, 2022
- Recorded: 2020–2022
- Studio: Various; Kilmarnock and Glasgow, Scotland
- Genre: Alternative rock, modern rock
- Length: 43:22
- Label: Easy Life
- Producer: Fatherson

Fatherson chronology
Sum of All Your Parts (2018)	Normal Fears (2022)

Normal Fears is the fourth studio album released by Scottish alternative rock group Fatherson. The album was released on 22 April 2022 through Easy Life.

== Background and recording ==
The album is described as "a lush lesson in letting go. Gorgeous, groove-led singalongs steeped in electronics find the band in a playful mode, putting break-ups, old ways of working and everyday worries behind them to start afresh, sunny side up". The album focuses on darker themes of life, with lead singer Ross Leighton saying "As Scots, it’s not in our nature to be optimistic. We find it easier to focus on the bad things in life rather than the good. This time, the darkness leads into light. This is not a break-up album, it’s a build yourself back up album". The album was written and recorded by the band remotely, with lead singer spending his time in his hometown of Kilmarnock, with bassist Marc Strain and drummer Greg Walkinshaw spending their time in Glasgow.

The band claimed that this approach to recording the album in two different locations was about doing things differently and "forgetting" what they had learned about recording as a band.

== Release and reception ==
Described as a personal album, critics noted the albums darker and meaningful lyrics than previous releases by the band. Despite this, critics noted that "it is an accessible journey for the listener as the concerns are common". The album received favourable reception, with Narc claiming that the band have produced a "strong release".

== Promotion ==
To promote the release of the album, the band released the track "Normal People" as the lead single from the album.

== Track listing ==
1. "End of the World"
2. "Love for Air"
3. "Normal People"
4. "Everything"
5. "Do It For Yourself"
6. "Honest to God"
7. "That Feeling and the Sound"
8. "Dive"
9. "Better Friend"
10. "All the Time"
11. "365"
12. "Crying Wolf"
13. "Wreckage in the Rubble"

== Credits ==
- Ross Leighton – vocals, guitar, songwriter, production
- Greg Walkinshaw – vocals, drums, songwriter, production
- Marc Strain – vocals, bass, songwriter, production

== Chart performance ==
Chart (2022)	Peak position
Scottish Albums (OCC)	2
UK Albums (OCC)	47
UK Independent Albums (OCC)	1
