= Heavy Heavy =

Studio album by Young Fathers
- Released: 3 February 2023
- Studios: Out of the Blue (Leith); Narcissus Studio (London); Northwind (Durban)
- Length: 32:35
- Label: Ninja Tune
- Producer: Graham "G" Hastings

Young Fathers chronology
| Cocoa Sugar (2018) | Heavy Heavy (2023) | 28 Years Later (2025) |

Singles from Heavy Heavy
- 1. "Geronimo" Released: 12 July 2022; 2. "I Saw" Released: 20 October 2022; 3. "Tell Somebody" Released: 6 December 2022; 4. "Rice" Released: 9 January 2023

Heavy Heavy is the fourth studio album by the Scottish indie group Young Fathers. It was released by Ninja Tune on 3 February 2023. The album was shortlisted for the 2023 Mercury Prize, won the Scottish Album of the Year Award, and was nominated for British Album of the Year at the Brit Awards.

== Recording ==
Heavy Heavy was produced by Graham "G" Hastings with additional production by Iain Berryman. It was recorded at three different studios: Out of the Blue Music Studios in Leith; Narcissus Studio in London; and Northwind in Durban, South Africa.

"Sink or Swim" features a sample replay produced by Richard Adlam and Hal Ritson for Replay Heaven.

== Release ==
On 12 July 2022, the band released the single "Geronimo", their first new music in four years. The album was officially announced on 20 October 2022, alongside a second single "I Saw" and a music video directed by Austrian-Nigerian artist David Uzochukwu. A third single, "Tell Somebody", was released on 6 December 2022 with another Uzochukwu-directed music video. "Rice", the fourth and final single, was released on 9 January 2023, also with a Uzochukwu-directed visual. It was released by Ninja Tune on 3 February 2023.

== Critical reception ==
Professional ratings
Aggregate scores
| Source | Rating |
|---|---|
| AnyDecentMusic? | 8.5/10 |
| Metacritic | 86/100 |
Review scores
| Source | Rating |
| AllMusic | 4/5 stars |
| DIY | 5/5 stars |
| Exclaim! | 8/10 |
| Mojo | 4/5 stars |
| NME | 5/5 stars |
| The Observer | 4/5 stars |
| Pitchfork | 7.5/10 |
| The Scotsman | 4/5 stars |
| The Skinny | 5/5 stars |
| Uncut | 8/10 |

Heavy Heavy was met with critical acclaim. At Metacritic, which assigns a normalized rating out of 100 to reviews from professional publications, the album received an average score of 86, based on 17 reviews.

Anthony Boire of Exclaim! gave the album an 8 out 10 rating, writing, "Heavy Heavy may be a little too sweet for long-time listeners, but its massive choruses, strong hooks and ecstatic sound too timely and too powerful to deny." Loud and Quiet Mag gave the album 9/10, calling it "a brilliant return from a gold-standard band in UK music". The Scotsman gave the album 4/5, writing Heavy Heavy "is delivered with mic-drop confidence, encased in another striking sleeve, redolent of partying with claws out".

Reviewing the album for AllMusic, Andy Kellman noted, "Heavy Heavy pulls in the listener with an empathetic lust for life that, whether brimming with optimism, steeling for a threat to survival, or reckoning with a perceived futility of existence, somehow never wavers." For DIY Magazine, Sean Kerwick described it as, " Unique, raw and totally joyous." In the review for NME, Dhruva Balram declared that, "Heavy Heavy is a passionate, soulful and often mesmerising work that will stick around long past the first listen. Succinct and underpinned by a catchy melodic structure, it continues Young Fathers' peerless run of singular albums and further cements them as one of the more unique acts to exist today." Writing for The List, Kevin Fullerton gave the album five stars, claiming that Heavy Heavy ‘feels like a culmination of the core Young Fathers sound.’

Writing for Pitchfork, Will Pritchard stated that, "Heavy Heavy sweeps its listener along, churchlike, and conveys the feeling that resisting the urge will always feel worse than rising up and pushing the air from your lungs. And then, after a brief 10 tracks, it's all over—as if the procession has marched on, out of earshot. But the invite is still there extended: It's up to you whether to accept it or not."

=== Year-end lists ===
Select year-end rankings of Heavy Heavy
| Publication/critic | Accolade | Rank | Ref. |
|---|---|---|---|
| Clash | Albums of the Year 2023 | 5 | |
| Consequence | The 50 Best Albums of 2023 | 33 | |
| DIY | Albums of the Year 2023 | 4 | |
| The Guardian | The 50 best albums of 2023 | 2 | |
| The Independent | The 30 Best Albums of 2023 | 9 | |
| Mojo | The 75 Best Albums of 2023 | 5 | |
| musicOMH | Top 50 Albums of 2023 | 3 | |
| NME | The Best Albums of 2023 | 3 | |
| PopMatters | The 80 Best Albums of 2023 | 5 | |
| The Skinny | Albums of 2023 | 1 | |
| The Sunday Times | The 20 Best Albums of 2023 | 11 | |

== Track listing ==
All tracks are written by Kayus Bankole, Graham "G" Hastings and Alloysious Massaquoi; "Ululation" written with Tapiwa Mambo.

Heavy Heavy track listing
| No. | Title | Length |
|---|---|---|
| 1. | "Rice" | 2:39 |
| 2. | "I Saw" | 3:27 |
| 3. | "Drum" | 3:38 |
| 4. | "Tell Somebody" | 3:10 |
| 5. | "Geronimo" | 3:33 |
| 6. | "Shoot Me Down" | 3:28 |
| 7. | "Ululation" | 2:53 |
| 8. | "Sink or Swim" | 3:04 |
| 9. | "Holy Moly" | 3:29 |
| 10. | "Be Your Lady" | 3:14 |
| Total length: | | 32:35 |

== Personnel ==
Young Fathers

- Alloysious Massaquoi – vocals, toms, percussion
- Graham "G" Hastings – vocals, percussion, piano, organ, Vox Continental, Transcendent, Jasper, Korg Minipops, Boss PC-2, Mellotron, Syntrx, ER-1 drum machine, production, engineering
- Kayus Bankole – vocals, percussion

Additional musicians

- Liam Hutton – drums, percussion, talking drum, timpani, bin with chains
- Iain Berryman – guitar, bouzouki, piano, percussion
- Raven Bush – strings
- Tapiwa Mambo – vocals
- Toyiz Mchunu – vocals
- Nomasonto Mthembu – vocals
- Anele Mthembu – vocals
- Nonhlanhla Mhlongo – vocals

Technical

- Iain Berryman – additional production, engineering, mixing
- Drew Dungate-Smith – additional engineering
- Kristian Donaldson – additional engineering
- Niklas Fairclough – additional engineering
- Andrea Cozzaglio – assistant engineering
- Sophie Ellis – assistant engineering
- Ben Baptie – mixing
- Matt Colton – mastering

Sample on "Sink or Swim"

- Richard Adlam – production, drums, programming
- Hal Ritson – production, keyboards, programming

Art

- Hingston Studio – design, art direction

== Charts ==
Chart performance for Heavy Heavy
| Chart (2023) | Peak position |
|---|---|
| Australian Digital Albums (ARIA) | 23 |
| Belgian Albums (Ultratop Flanders) | 73 |
| German Albums (Offizielle Top 100) | 98 |
| Irish Albums (IRMA) | 84 |
| Scottish Albums (Official Charts) | 2 |
| UK Albums (Official Charts) | 7 |
| UK Independent Albums (Official Charts) | 2 |
