= Kathryn Joseph =

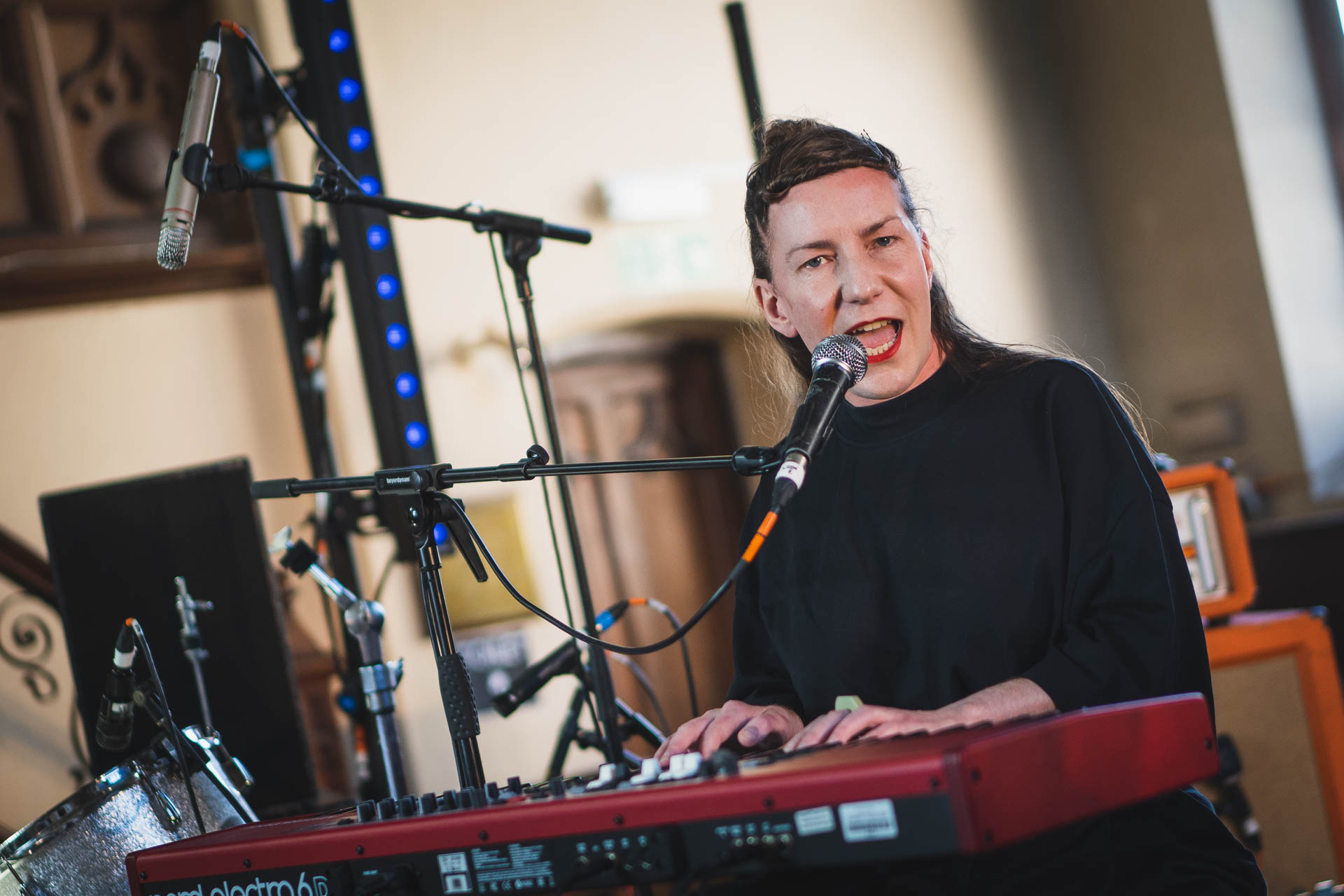
- at the Great Escape Festival in 2022

Background information
- Birth name: Kathryn Emma Sawers
- Born: 31 December 1974 (age 50); Inverness, Scotland
- Genres: Indie, indie folk, alternative
- Labels: Hits the Fan, Rock Action
- Website: http://kathrynjoseph.co.uk

Kathryn Joseph (born Kathryn Emma Sawers) is a Scottish singer-songwriter and musician. Her debut album Bones You Have Thrown Me and Blood I've Spilled won the 2015 Scottish Album of the Year Award.

In 2016, Joseph appeared on RM Hubbert's collaborative album Telling the Trees, providing vocals for the track "The Dog".

In 2017, Joseph collaborated with Marcus Mackay and The Twilight Sad's James Graham on the project Out Lines. Their album Conflats (2017, Rock Action Records) was released in October 2017.

Joseph, along with director, actor and musician Cora Bissett, wrote the music for a 2017 stage version of Emma Donoghue's book Room, which was produced by Theatre Royal Stratford East and Dublin's Abbey Theatre, in association with National Theatre of Scotland and Covent Garden Productions.

In June 2018, she appeared on the BBC Radio 4 programme "Loose Ends", and in August 2018 released her second album From When I Wake the Want Is. This album, like her debut, was shortlisted for the Scottish Album of the Year Award, but this time did not win the main prize.

In 2018, her versions of "Land O the Leal" and "Scots Wha Hae" were included in the film Outlaw King.

In 2022 Joseph released her third album, For You Who Are the Wronged, to critical acclaim.

Joseph released her fourth studio album, We Were Made Prey in 2025.

== Discography ==
- Bones You Have Thrown Me and Blood I've Spilled (2016, Hits the Fan Records)
- From When I Wake the Want Is (2018, Rock Action Records)
- For You Who Are the Wronged (2022, Rock Action Records)
- For You Who Are the Wronged (Lomond Campbell remixes EP) (2024, Rock Action Records)
- We Were Made Prey (2025, Rock Action Records)
