= Forest Floor =

Studio album by Fergus McCreadie
- Released: 8 April 2022
- Recorded: 6–8 July 2021
- Studio: QuietMoney, Hastings, England
- Genre: Jazz, Scottish folk music
- Label: Edition
- Producer: Fergus McCreadie

Fergus McCreadie chronology
Cairn (2021)	Forest Floor (2022)	Sketches (2023)

Singles from Forest Floor
- 1. "Law Hill" Released: 28 March 2022

Forest Floor is the third studio album by Scottish jazz pianist Fergus McCreadie, released on 8 April 2022 by Edition Records. The album was recorded 6–8 July 2021 by McCreadie, bassist David Bowden, and drummer Stephen Henderson. It was shortlisted for the Mercury Prize and won the Scottish Album of the Year Award. The lead single "Law Hill" was released 28 March.

== Commercial performance ==
The album debuted at #1 on the UK's Official Jazz & Blues Albums Chart Top 30 on 15 April.

== Style and reception ==
Forest Floor ratings
Review scores
Source	Rating
The Jazz Mann	4/5 stars

The Jazz Mann's Ian Mann notes that McCreadie's compositions "are strongly influenced by Scottish traditional music and also draw inspiration from Scottish landscape and folklore. Other Scottish musicians such as trumpeter Colin Steele and drummer Tom Bancroft have drawn on similar sources, as has pianist Dave Milligan, but nobody has integrated these into the format of the jazz piano trio quite as convincingly and successfully as McCreadie." The music is "both accessible, thanks to the folk / song like qualities of the often beautiful writing and challenging, due to the sheer energy and intensity of the performances", and it's "easy to see why the McCreadie trio has attracted such attention from jazz fans and why the band are now considered to be major players on the jazz stage in the UK and beyond. His music may be rooted in the Scottish landscape but Fergus McCreadie is a world class act." London Jazz News's Graham Spry agrees, writing that "Fergus McCreadie's music is very much rooted in his native country, and yet it has both audience and critical appeal well beyond Scotland's shores."

Jazzwise writes that "several of these trio tracks carry quite a punch"; that while "solos by Bowden and Henderson are relatively few and far between", "they contribute mightily to the overall impact of this performance"; and that "McCreadie has put sufficient space between himself and the meanderings of an average piano trio record." Jazz Views's Nick Lea calls McCreadie "too young to apply the old adage of improving with age", but that this still appears to be occurring for the whole trio who have "developed intuitively, and almost telepathically, to a level of integration that is phenomenal", with "truly breath taking" playing throughout the record that "continues to remind us why the piano trio occupies such a vital, vibrant, ever changing and ubiquitous presence in jazz." JazzTimes's Andrew Hamlin says McCreadie "ignites" the album "with a flurry of precisely placed notes, rich harmonies in forest-fire motion."

=== Accolades ===
Forest Floor accolades
Year	Award	Status	Ref.
2022	Mercury Prize	Shortlisted	
2022	Scottish Album of the Year Award	Won	
2022	Scottish Jazz Award for Best Album	Won	

== Track listing ==
All tracks are written by Fergus McCreadie

Forest Floor track listing
No.	Title	Length
1.	"Law Hill"	6:52
2.	"The Unfurrowed Field"	8:36
3.	"Morning Moon"	5:52
4.	"Landslide"	4:33
5.	"Forest Floor"	4:29
6.	"The Ridge"	10:27
7.	"White Water"	8:16
8.	"Glade"	5:42

== Personnel ==
- Fergus McCreadie - piano, producer
- David Bowden - double bass
- Stephen Henderson - drums
- Dave Stapleton - executive producer
- James McMillan - recording and mixing engineer
- Michael Scherchen - mastering engineer
- Oli Bentley - album artwork
