= Highest 2 Lowest (soundtrack) =

2025 soundtrack albums

Highest 2 Lowest (Soundtrack from the Apple Original Film)

Soundtrack album by various artists
- Released: August 15, 2025
- Genre: Film soundtrack
- Length: 74:23
- Label: A24 Music; Apple

Highest 2 Lowest (Score from the Apple Original Film)

Film score by Howard Drossin
- Released: August 15, 2025
- Genre: Film score
- Length: 1:14:36
- Label: A24 Music; Apple
- Producer: Howard Drossin

Highest 2 Lowest (Fergus McCreadie Trio EP)

EP by Fergus McCreadie Trio
- Released: August 15, 2025
- Length: 1:14:36
- Label: A24 Music; Apple
- Producer: Howard Drossin

The soundtrack to the 2025 crime thriller film Highest 2 Lowest directed by Spike Lee starring Denzel Washington, Jeffrey Wright, Ilfenesh Hadera, ASAP Rocky, John Douglas Thompson, Dean Winters, LaChanze, Princess Nokia, and Ice Spice, are three musical projects produced by A24 Music and Apple Video Programming, released on August 15, 2025, the same day as the film's theatrical release.

The first soundtrack, Highest 2 Lowest (Soundtrack from the Apple Original Film) is the soundtrack album featuring songs performed by ASAP Rocky, Aiyana-Lee, and Jensen McRae, amongst others. The second soundtrack, Highest 2 Lowest (Score from the Apple Original Film), features original score composed by Howard Drossin, and the third album Highest 2 Lowest (Fergus McCreadie Trio EP) is an extended play performed by the Fergus McCreadie Trio.

== Development ==
As Highest 2 Lowest, partly being a musical film, Spike tasked the artists ASAP Rocky, Aiyana-Lee and Jensen McRae to write original songs for the film. Rocky wrote two songs—"Both Eyes Closed" and "Trunks", while Aiyana-Lee wrote the titular track and McRae wrote "King David". Rocky's songs were performed from the perspective of Young Felon, the antagonist rapper, whereas Lee and McRae were chosen through their performances they posted on Instagram.

Aiyana-Lee's vocals felt suited for a "gangbuster" song during the end of the films, reminiscent of Jennifer Hudson's rendition of "You're Gonna Love Me" from Dreamgirls (2006). Aiyana-Lee recorded multiple songs after being guided by Spike, until they show the titular track. It was featured at the end of the film, with Aiyana-Lee recording on set opposite Washington. She also recorded the song "Prisencolin (Americano Joint)", a take on Adriano Celentano's "Prisencolinensinainciusol". McRae was chosen to record the folk song "King David" after listening to her songs from her upcoming album I Don't Know How But They Found Me! Two versions of "King David" were written within 30 minutes. The song was further recorded with the Scottish jazz band Fergus McReadie trio, whom Spike was impressed after their performance at the Edinburgh Jazz Festival.

The film score is composed by Howard Drossin who had worked as an orchestrator for Terence Blanchard, Spike's frequent collaborator. Drossin layered the instrumentation for the titular track, and other songs. Drossin further collaborated with the Fergus McReadie trio to underscore various sequences. The score was recorded in New York with a 90-piece orchestra.

Initially, Drossin joined the film only to work with Aiyana-Lee on the film's title track, before Spike asked him to score the film. He wrote a "lush, orchestral score" reminiscent of the 1970s music, accompanied by piano and guitar-driven compositions for King as it was "a deeply expressive instrument that has so much range" representing the character, while piano solos were used to represent the character's angst. Spike and Drossin spotted several sequences where they needed music and discussed on the color and texture of the score, as well as notifying the instrumentation and sounding. Drossin added, "Spike has great musical instincts, and he trusts his instincts. And I trust him because every comment he's ever made and everything that I've done with him has made me better."

== Release ==
The track list was announced on August 6, 2025, featuring 19 tracks. The title track was preceded as the single on the same date, while Rocky's "Both Eyes Closed and "Trunks" were released on August 15. The soundtrack was released on August 15, in conjunction with the theatrical release. Drossin's original score and an extended play by the Fergus McReadie trio also accompanied the soundtrack release.

== Reception ==
Stephanie Zacharek of Time wrote "Howard Drossin's magnificent score—sometimes majestic, sometimes achingly melancholy—follows the movie's shifting moods perfectly." David Rooney of The Hollywood Reporter stated "The film is packed with great music, starting with Howard Drossin’s mood-shifting score, which ranges from melancholy piano to cascades of jazz, and two electrifying performances that add a massive charge. One of those is the title song, a big-build power anthem belted to the heavens by singer Aiyana-Lee. And the cast is top-to-toe excellent, with special honors to Washington, Jeffrey Wright and A$AP Rocky, who follows his work in If I Had Legs I’d Kick You with further proof of a megawatt screen presence. He also performs two original songs, “Trunks” and “Both Eyes Closed.”"

Robbie Collin of The Daily Telegraph wrote "Howard Drossin's score starts literally reeling, striking up a four-four Celtic stomp that compounds the mad intermingling of cultures and tones." Pete Hammond of Deadline Hollywood wrote "As is the case with most Lee joints, this one has a superb, soaring musical score from Howard Drossin that really feels NYC to its core." María Muñoz of Metal wrote "If New York is a character, so is the music. Howard Drossin's score swings between dissonant jazz and hard-edged hip-hop, echoing the protagonist's internal conflict." John Bleasdale of Time Out wrote "long-time composer Howard Drossin's soundtrack is interminable and spends a lot of time sounding like an Irish jig."

== Track listing ==
Highest 2 Lowest (Soundtrack from the Apple Original Film) track listing
No.	Title	Artist(s)	Length
1.	"Highest 2 Lowest"	Aiyana-Lee	3:35
2.	"We Got This"	Fergus McCreadie Trio and Howard Drossin	5:41
3.	"And Now We Shall Begin"	Howard Drossin	1:35
4.	"Oh, What a Beautiful Mornin'"	Norm Lewis	3:13
5.	"All Money Ain't Good Money"	Howard Drossin	4:29
6.	"Loving Partners"	Fergus McCreadie Trio	4:12
7.	"Da Lowdown"	Eddie Palmieri and Afro-Caribbean Jazz Octet	4:58
8.	"Trunks"	ASAP Rocky	3:43
9.	"The Chase"	Fergus McCreadie Trio and Howard Drossin	5:02
10.	"Paul Begs" (Solo Piano)	Fergus McCreadie Trio	3:37
11.	"Da Kings"	Howard Drossin	1:13
12.	"Questioning Kyle"	Howard Drossin	2:49
13.	"King David"	Jensen McRae	3:03
14.	"Both Eyes Closed"	ASAP Rocky	4:13
15.	"Loving Partners"	Howard Drossin	3:44
16.	"Puerto Rico"	Eddie Palmieri and the Salsa Orchestra	7:08
17.	"Paul Begs"	Fergus McCreadie Trio	5:00
18.	"Brooklyn Hospital"	Howard Drossin	2:28
19.	"Prisencolin" (Americano Joint)	Aiyana-Lee	4:40
Total length:			74:23

Highest 2 Lowest (Score from the Apple Original Film) track listing
No.	Title	Length
1.	"Loving Partners" (Orchestra)	3:44
2.	"Somebody Got Trey"	2:47
3.	"Kings and NYPD Detecting"	3:35
4.	"Trey Is Found"	3:40
5.	"It's All About the Size" (Fergus McCreadie and Howard Drossin)	1:26
6.	"Paul Begs" (Score)	3:11
7.	"Ice Cold"	0:41
8.	"Lobby Talk"	2:17
9.	"Father 2 Son"	4:40
10.	"Balcony Disconnect"	2:16
11.	"Paul On His Knees 1"	0:46
12.	"Paul On His Knees 2"	1:04
13.	"Stony Gate" (Fergus McCreadie)	1:15
14.	"We Got This (Stony Gate 2)" (Fergus McCreadie and Howard Drossin)	5:41
15.	"Da Kings"	1:14
16.	"Questioning Kyle"	2:50
17.	"These Mean Streets"	0:43
18.	"The Chase" (Fergus McCreadie and Howard Drossin)	5:03
19.	"Brooklyn Hospital"	2:29
20.	"Free Yung Felon"	1:08
Total length:		50:30

Highest 2 Lowest (Fergus McCreadie Trio EP) track listing
No.	Title	Length
1.	"Stony Gate"	1:15
2.	"All Money Ain't Good Money" (Trio)	4:46
3.	"Loving Partners" (Trio)	4:09
4.	"Paul Begs" (Solo Piano)	3:36
5.	"All Money Ain't Good Money" (Solo Piano)	4:20
6.	"It's All About the Size" (Fergus McCreadie and Howard Drossin)	1:26
7.	"Loving Partners" (Solo Piano)	2:32
8.	"Paul Begs" (Trio)	4:55
9.	"The Son, The Burden"	3:48
Total length:		30:47
