= Jamestown, Easter Ross =

Coordinates: 57.57285°N 4.54893°W

Jamestown: Scottish Gaelic: Baile Sheumais
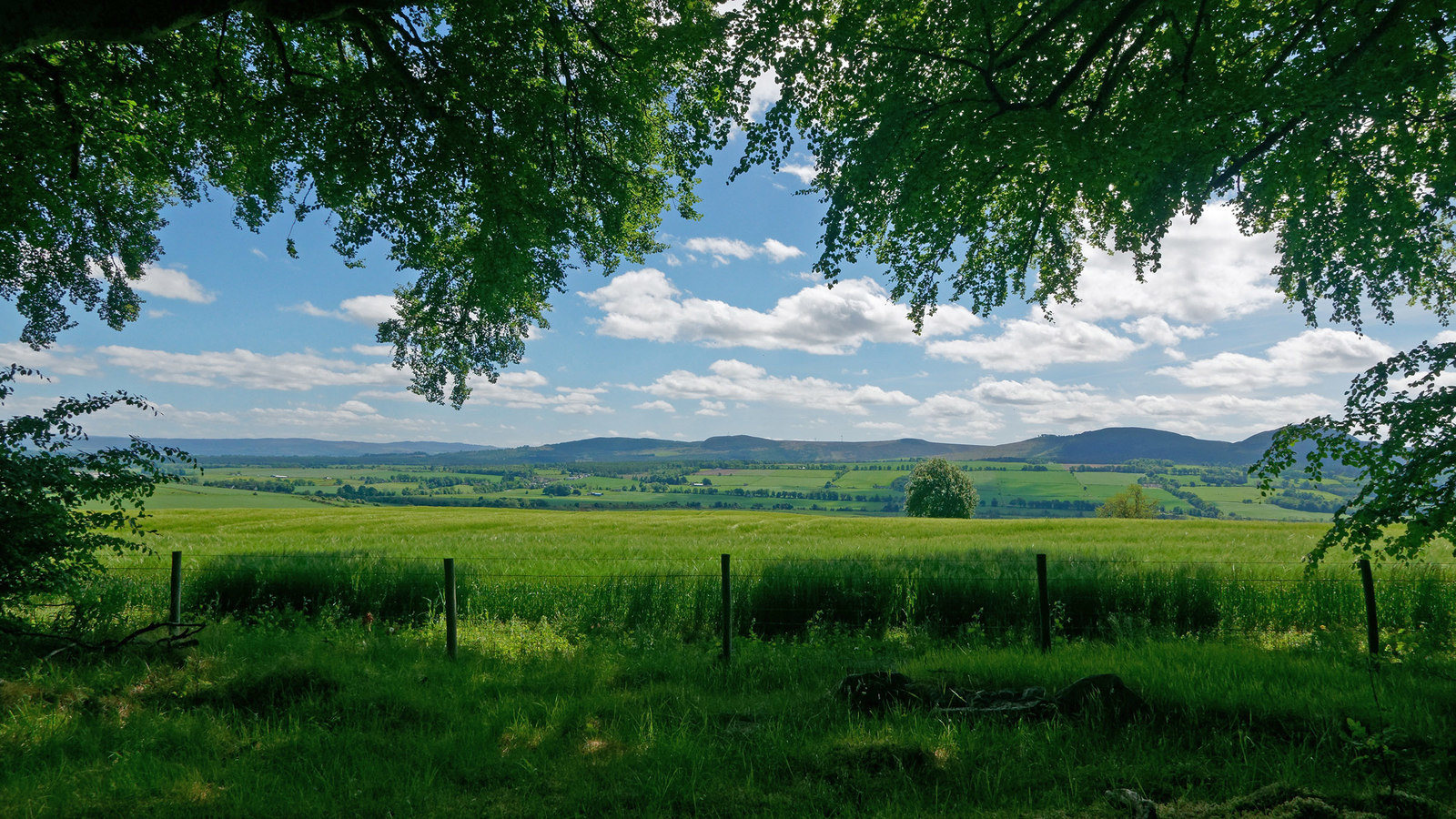
- Farmland in Jamestown

- Location within the Ross and Cromarty area
- OS grid reference: NH476565
- Council area: Highland
- Country: Scotland
- Sovereign state: United Kingdom
- Post town: [Parish of Contin]
- Postcode district: IV14 9
- Police: Scotland
- Fire: Scottish
- Ambulance: Scottish

Jamestown (Scottish Gaelic: Baile Sheumais) is a village in Strathpeffer (and formerly of 'Ross-shire'), Scottish Highlands and is in the Scottish council area of Highland.

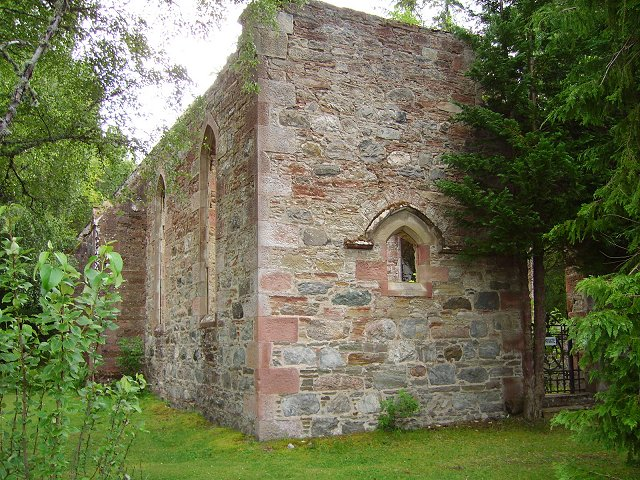
The old kirk at Jamestown

== Notable people ==
- Jazz pianist Fergus McCreadie was born in Jamestown.
