= Fergus McCreadie =

Scottish jazz pianist (born 1997)

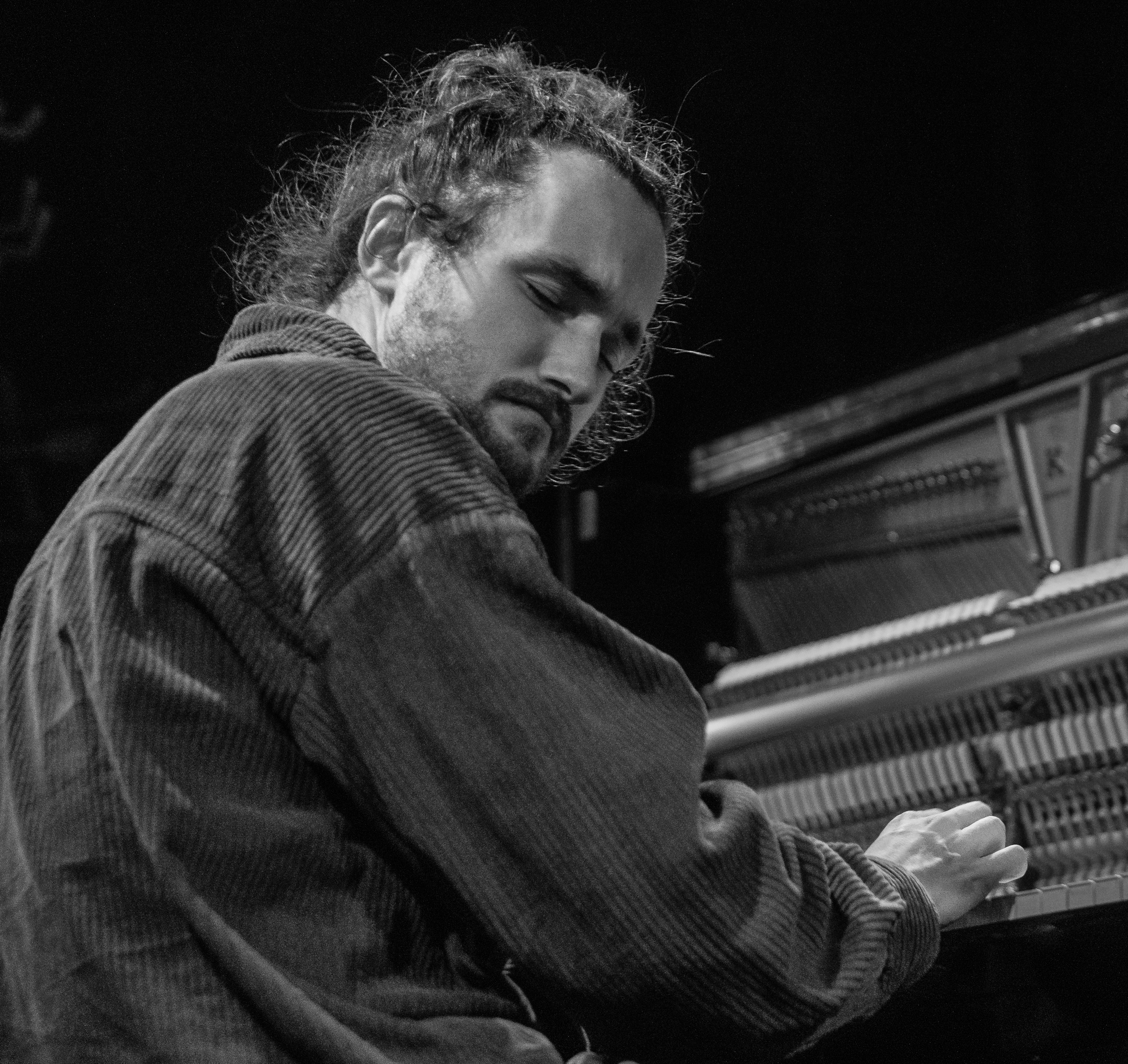
- Fergus McCreadie performing at Herr Nilsen, Oslo 2023
- Born: 12 July 1997 (age 29); Jamestown, Easter Ross, Scotland
- Education: Dollar Academy; Royal Conservatoire of Scotland
- Occupation: Musician
- Notable work: Forest Floor
- Awards: Full list
- Musical career
- Origin: Dollar, Clackmannanshire
- Genres: Jazz; Scottish folk music
- Instrument: Piano
- Label: Edition
- Member of: corto.alto; Graham Costello's Strata
- Website: Official website

Fergus McCreadie (born 12 July 1997) is a Scottish jazz pianist and composer. His style revolves around a fusion of contemporary jazz with Scottish folk music. He has released five albums to date as leader of a piano trio. His third album, Forest Floor, was shortlisted for the 2022 Mercury Prize, and won the Scottish Album of the Year Award and the Scottish Jazz Award for Best Album. He has also released three EPs, including one which was part of the soundtrack for the 2025 film Highest 2 Lowest.

== Early life ==
Fergus McCreadie was born 12 July 1997 in Jamestown, Easter Ross, Scotland, and grew up in Dollar, Clackmannanshire. McCreadie's first experience playing music was on the bagpipes, though he concedes he "was not good at that at all." He saw a jazz piano performance around age 12, and said it "changed my life. It looked so fun, so free and so creative in the way that everyone interacted with each other." McCreadie's parents paid £20 for a broken-down piano; however, he mostly practiced with a Yamaha electric piano through headphones in his bedroom after noise complaints from a neighbor.

McCreadie attended Dollar Academy as a teen, then studied jazz at the Royal Conservatoire of Scotland under Tommy Smith, where he also played in Smith's Youth Jazz Orchestra. At the conservatoire, he met bassist David Bowden and drummer Stephen Henderson, the other two players in McCreadie's trio. He graduated from the conservatoire in 2018.

== Career ==
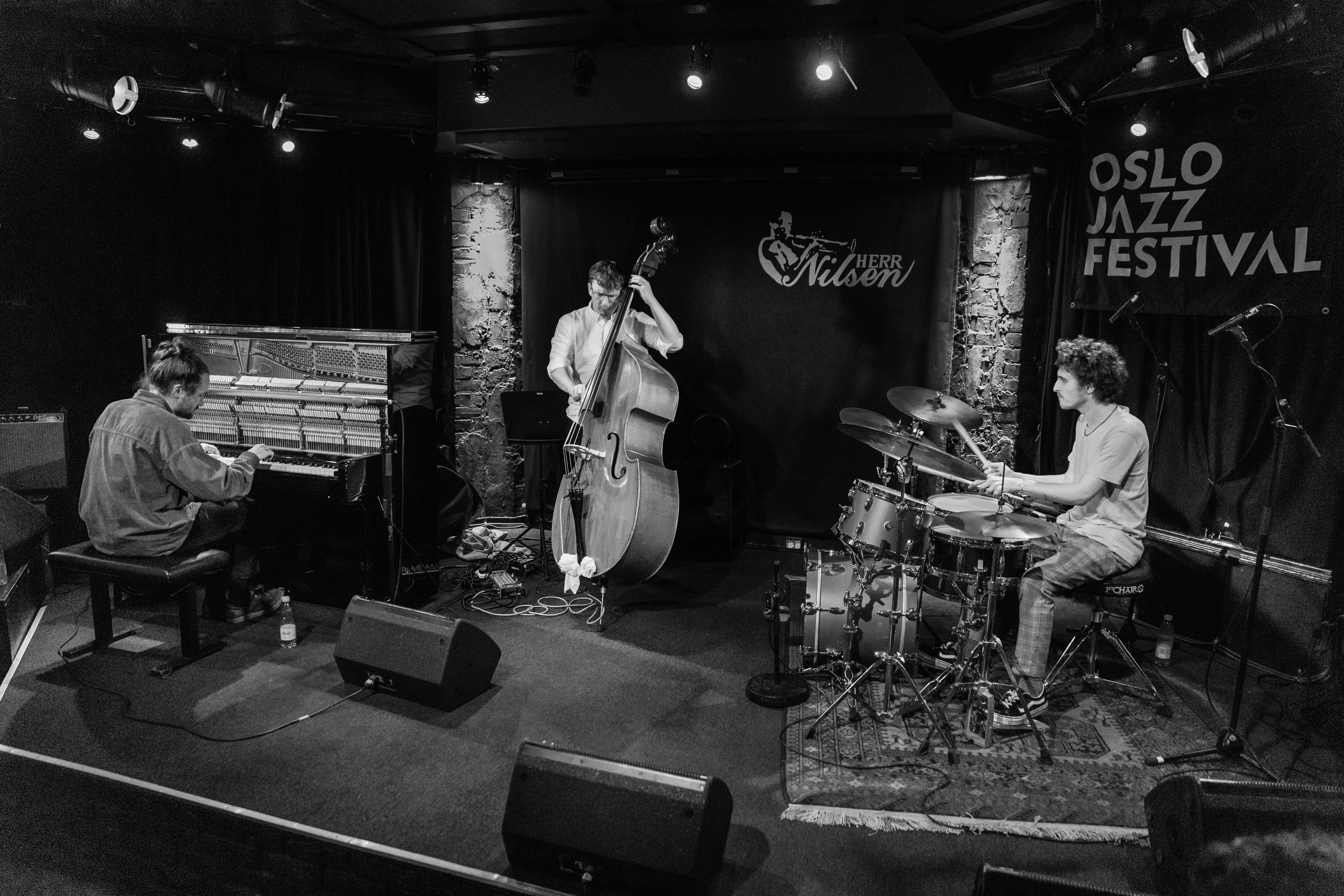
The Fergus McCreadie Trio performing at Oslo Jazzfestival in 2023.

On 6 November 2023, McCreadie announced a 5-track solo piano EP titled Sketches, which was released by Edition Records on 26 November. The project was recorded on 21 August at Solas Sound in Glasgow, with Gus Stirrat as recording and mixing engineer.

In January 2024, McCreadie announced his fourth album Stream, which was released on 3 May by Edition. Spectrum Culture's Konstantin N. Rega called the album "a forceful work of beauty, patience, stamina and creativity." Stream was followed by an EP, Stream (Revisited), released on Edition on 4 April 2025.

On 24 June 2025, McCreadie announced his fifth album, The Shieling, set for release on 24 October by Edition. The lead single, "Wayfinder", was released on 25 July. The same year, McCreadie contributed multiple tracks to the soundtrack of the Spike Lee film Highest 2 Lowest, which were released as part of the film's official soundtrack album and a separate EP of just McCreadie's contributions, both released by A24 Music.

== Style and influences ==
McCreadie is known for combining contemporary jazz with Scottish folk music inspired by his homeland's natural landscape. McCreadie describes this genre crossover by saying "jazz is kind of a folk music in itself. It has a lot of the characteristics, and it's grown up in a lot of the same ways." McCreadie says he is most inspired by American jazz pianist Keith Jarrett, and notes his music taste as also including Glenn Gould, Martha Argerich, Oscar Peterson, McCoy Tyner, Caoimhín Ó Raghallaigh, and Mick O'Brien.

In a concert review from 2024, The Skinny's Zoë White described McCreadie as sitting forward facing his audience and speaking candidly about his music in between songs. White noted the "endearing contrast between his down-to-earth anecdotes about hill walks, mountain streams and Scottish weather, and the hypnotic beauty of the music itself."

== Accolades ==
Awards and nominations received by Fergus McCreadie
Year	Award	Work	Status	Ref.
2015	Young Scottish Jazz Musician of the Year	Himself	Runner-up	
2016	Peter Whittingham Jazz Award	Himself	Won	
2019	Scottish Album of the Year Award	Turas	Shortlisted	
2021	Scottish Album of the Year Award	Cairn	Longlisted	
2022	Mercury Prize	Forest Floor	Shortlisted	
2022	Scottish Album of the Year Award	Forest Floor	Won	
2022	Scottish Jazz Award for Best Album	Forest Floor	Won	
2023	Scottish Jazz Award for Best Band	Fergus McCreadie Trio	Nominated	

McCreadie has also won the Young Scottish Jazz Musician of the Year's under-17 category in 2013 and 2014, the Linda Trahan Memorial Prize University of St Andrews, and the Guy Barker Award at the Royal Conservatoire of Scotland. McCreadie was selected for BBC Radio 3's New Generation Artists, becoming the first non-classical musician chosen for the recognition.

== Personal life ==
As of 2022, McCreadie lived in Glasgow.

== Discography ==
=== Albums ===
- Turas (as Fergus McCreadie Trio, self-release, 2018)
- Cairn (Edition, 2021)
- Forest Floor (Edition, 2022)
- Stream (Edition, 2024)
- The Shieling (Edition, 2025)

=== EPs ===
- Sketches (Edition, 2023)
- Stream (Revisited) (Edition, 2025)
- Highest 2 Lowest: Fergus McCreadie Trio EP (A24, 2025)

=== Singles ===
Fergus McCreadie singles
Year	Name	Album
2020	"Cairn"	Cairn
2021	"An Old Friend"	Cairn
2021	"Jig"	Cairn
2021	"Cairn (Live)"	Cairn
2021	"Jig (Live)"	Cairn
2021	"An Old Friend (Live)"	Cairn
2022	"Law Hill"	Forest Floor
2022	"Morning Moon"	Forest Floor
2022	"The Unfurrowed Field"	Forest Floor
2024	"Stony Gate"	Stream
2024	"Snowcap"	Stream
2025	"Wayfinder"	The Shieling
