= 28 Years Later (soundtrack) =

2025 film score

28 Years Later (Original Motion Picture Soundtrack)

Film score by Young Fathers
- Released: 20 June 2025
- Studios: The Shed, Leith,AIR Studios, London
- Genre: Film score
- Length: 66:52
- Label: Milan
- Producer: Young Fathers

Young Fathers chronology
Heavy Heavy (2023)	28 Years Later (Original Motion Picture Soundtrack) (2025)

28 Years Later (Original Motion Picture Soundtrack) is the film score to the 2025 film 28 Years Later directed by Danny Boyle; the third installment in the 28 Days Later film series. The album features music composed by the Scottish group Young Fathers, in their film debut, and released through Milan Records on 20 June 2025.

== Development ==
"The genre-defying, intuitive sound of Young Fathers is uniquely suited to the world of 28 Years Later. They have crafted a musical landscape that brings an intense, primal energy to the visuals but also heart and humanity to a world that is at once horrific and strangely beautiful."

— Danny Boyle on working with Young Fathers.

The Scottish progressive hip hop group Young Fathers—a trio consisting of Alloysious Massaquoi, Kayus Bankole and Graham Hastings—composed the film score for 28 Years Later, replacing John Murphy who did the same for its predecessors. Boyle chose them to work on the film on his affinity towards their work and collaborated with crew members from Scotland, as the film was set in that country. Boyle used some of their music for T2 Trainspotting (2017).

Boyle added that he cannot brief someone for scoring an apocalyptic genre, sending them the script and discussing about it and also sending the songs they are listening while editing the film, so they could discuss about music over ideas, with the composer sending the demos. Working with a band, who never scored for a film was a huge risk, which Boyle noted "Sony didn't know the first thing about them, but they were wonderful" and had described the band as "The Beach Boys on steroids" emphasizing on the use of vocal harmonies and beats which worked well for the genre.

The band worked in a crammed shed in Edinburgh, where "they produce extraordinary stuff there. It was very beautiful. There's some of the stuff you'd expect from them in there, which gives a very different flavour to the film."

== Release ==
The soundtrack was released through Milan Records on 20 June 2025, the same day as the film.

== Reception ==
Shannon Connellan of Mashable wrote "The Scottish hip-hop trio does not appear in the film, but they bring their signature experimental style to a hypnotic and merciless score that functions as an omnipresent threat. Their soundtrack simultaneously hums like a revving vehicle, flickers like a crow pecking at remains, shrieks like a human pursued by some grotesquerie, and echoes like an unidentified beast caterwauling into the night." Robert Daniels of RogerEbert.com and Ben Travis of Empire called it "ethereal" and "astonishing". Amy Nicholson of Los Angeles Times described it a "chilling electronic score". Damon Wise of Deadline Hollywood called it "ominous".

Nikki Baughan of Screen International wrote "Young Fathers' intense score combines with an ardent, altered narration of Rudyard Kipling's repetitive wartime poem 'Boots' to create a frightening, disorienting soundscape." David Rooney of The Hollywood Reporter called it a "wide-ranging score" that accompanies "disturbing passages of ambient synth distortion with propulsive action riffs, bristling with violent drumbeats." Katie Walsh of The Seattle Times wrote "the score by Scottish band Young Fathers clashes with industrial noise, blending with the sound design by Johnnie Burn, pulsing with sirens and heavy footfalls." Jordan Bassett of NME called it an "elegiac soundtrack" Chris Bumbray of JoBlo.com called it "a terrific soundtrack by Young Fathers, though the absence of the classic John Murphy theme takes a bit of getting used to."

== Track listing ==
All tracks are written by Young Fathers.

Track listing
No.	Title	Length
1.	"Promised Land"	3:13
2.	"Lowly"	3:36
3.	"Boots (Note: Contains interpolations of Rudyard Kipling's Boots poem as read by Taylor Holmes in 1915.)"	3:10
4.	"Slow Low I"	2:26
5.	"Travelling"	1:09
6.	"Abide"	1:10
7.	"Alpha Intro"	2:36
8.	"Alpha"	2:33
9.	"Mask"	1:10
10.	"Sheku"	3:58
11.	"Causeway"	5:08
12.	"Mania"	6:16
13.	"Rise"	2:05
14.	"Slow Low II"	2:44
15.	"Calling Card"	1:19
16.	"Alpha Tunnel I"	0:43
17.	"Alpha Tunnel II"	0:44
18.	"Happy Eater"	4:44
19.	"Baby Born"	1:47
20.	"Alpha Baby"	2:52
21.	"Hum"	2:36
22.	"Hush"	1:10
23.	"Remember"	5:29
24.	"Pals"	4:03
Total length:		66:52

== Personnel ==
Credits adapted from Film Music Reporter:

- Music composed and produced by: Young Fathers
- Music supervisor: Simon Astall
- Music mixer: James Trevascus
- Music editor: Rachel Park
- Conductor and orchestrator: Rosie Danvers
- Orchestral engineer and pre-mixer: Jake Jackson
- Score recordist: John Prestage
- Orchestral contractor and score reader: Hilary Skewes
- Orchestral session co-producers: Rosie Danvers, Tommy Danvers
- Orchestral copyist: Colin Rae
- Assistant engineers: Eve Morris, Wil Jones
- Head of studios: Charlotte Matthews
- Score coordinator: Katy Jackson
- Solo violins: Jonathan Morton, Ben Hancox, Max Baille, Hannah Dawson
- Solo viola: Ann Beilby
- Orchestra recorded at AIR Studios, London

== Additional music ==
Additional music featured in the film includes the following:

- "Abide with Me" by Henry Francis Lyte
- "Vorspiel" by Richard Wagner; arranged by Rosie Danvers
- "Vorspiel - New Worlds Mix" by Dean Valentine, Matt Sheeran, & Young Fathers
- "Blaydon Races" by Geordie Ridley; performed by Ruairidh Maclean & Ruairidh Graham
- "Delilah" by Barry Mason & Les Reed; performed by Ruairidh Maclean & Ruairidh Graham
- "The Atholl Highlanders", traditional; performed by Ruairidh Maclean & Ruairidh Graham
- "East Hastings" by Godspeed You! Black Emperor
- "Teletubbies Theme" by Andrew McCrorie-Shand; performed by That Band Called Susan

== Charts ==
Chart performance for 28 Years Later (Original Motion Picture Soundtrack)
Chart (2025)	Peak position
Scottish Albums (Official Charts)	85
UK Album Downloads (Official Charts)	43
