= Tape Two =

EP by Young Fathers
- Released: 11 June 2013
- Genres: Hip hop, alternative R&B
- Length: 23:38
- Label: Anticon
- Producer: Young Fathers

Young Fathers chronology
Tape One (2011)	Tape Two (2013)	Dead (2014)

Tape Two is the second EP by Scottish hip hop group Young Fathers. It was released on 11 June 2013 through Anticon. Despite being an EP, Tape Two won the Scottish Album of the Year award for 2013.

== Critical reception ==
Professional ratings
Aggregate scores
Source	Rating
Metacritic	84/100
Review scores
Source	Rating
AllMusic	3.5/5 stars
Robert Christgau	A−
Clash	9/10
MusicOMH	4/5 stars
This Is Fake DIY	8/10

Tape Two received critical acclaim from contemporary music critics. It currently holds a score of 84 out of 100 on Metacritic based on 6 reviews, which indicates "universal acclaim".

Jack Chesterfield of Clash said, "While Young Fathers may lack stereotypical Scottish sonic behaviour – whatever your own perception of that may be – they channel the same perplexing distinction into exhilaratingly baffling production and refreshingly sharp and passionate lyrics." Jason Lymangrover of AllMusic stated that "While this is a continuation of the weird blend of bedroom beats the Scottish teens invented on Tape One, Tape Two isn't exactly more of the same, but more like a darker side of the same coin, or the wintry cold spell that follows the warm summer outing." Jordan Mainzer of MusicOMH commented, "Overall, if Young Fathers can find a way to balance their complex combination of cultural and musical influence with their penchant for witty, surprising lyricism on all of their tracks, they are bound to become one of the most dynamic underground hip-hop groups working today."

== Track listing ==
No.	Title	Length
1.	"I Heard"	3:42
2.	"Come to Life"	2:45
3.	"Only Child"	2:02
4.	"Queen Is Dead"	2:42
5.	"Bones"	0:51
6.	"Freefalling"	2:07
7.	"Mr. Martyr"	3:04
8.	"Way Down in the Hole"	2:50
9.	"Ebony Sky"	3:35
Total length:		23:38
