= Tape One =

EP by Young Fathers
- Released: November 2011; 22 January 2013 (Reissue)
- Genre: Hip hop
- Length: 20:18
- Label: Anticon
- Producer: Young Fathers

Young Fathers chronology
Tape One (2011)	Tape Two (2013)

Tape One is the debut EP by Scottish indie group Young Fathers. It was independently released in November 2011, and re-released on 22 January 2013 through Anticon.

== Critical reception ==
Professional ratings
Aggregate scores
Source	Rating
Metacritic	82/100
Review scores
Source	Rating
AllMusic	3.5/5 stars
BBC	favorable
The Line of Best Fit	8/10
MusicOMH	3/5 stars

Tape One received critical acclaim from contemporary music critics. It currently holds a score of 82 out of 100 on Metacritic based on 4 reviews, which indicates "universal acclaim".

According to The Line of Best Fit, Anthony Fantano's glowing review of the record brought Young Fathers to the attention of the label Anticon, to which the group eventually signed. Fred Thomas of AllMusic described the release as "equal parts electronic futurism and throwbacks to '90s R&B or trip-hop." Mike Diver of BBC stated that the trio "dissect rap constituents from the past 30-odd years and reassemble them into a striking realisation of what the genre can be in the 21st century." He added, "The results are both reminiscent of preceding emissions from rap’s fringe-mentality movers and shakers, and compellingly unique in their colourful fusions."

== Track listing ==
No.	Title	Length
1.	"Deadline"	2:05
2.	"Sister"	2:59
3.	"Rumbling"	2:12
4.	"Romance"	2:23
5.	"Fortunes"	0:50
6.	"Remains"	3:51
7.	"RRRamanda"	2:27
8.	"Dar-Eh Da Da Du"	3:31
Total length:		20:18
