= Open Book (Fatherson album) =

Studio album by Fatherson
- Released: 3 June 2016
- Length: 42:23
- Label: EasyLife/Sony

Fatherson chronology
I Am an Island (2014)	Open Book (2016)	Sum of All Your Parts (2018)

Open Book is the second studio album from Scottish alternative rock band Fatherson and was released on 3 June 2016. The album includes the singles "Always", "Lost Little Boys" and "Just Past the Point of Breaking". The album marks the band's first release with their new label Easy Life/Sony Music UK.

== Singles ==
- "Always" was released as the album's lead single on 25 November 2015.
- "Lost Little Boys" was released as the album's second single on 9 February 2016.
- "Just Past the Point of Breaking" was released as the album's third single on 10 May 2016.

== Critical reception ==
Professional ratings
Aggregate scores
Source	Rating
Metacritic	56/100
Review scores
Source	Rating
The Skinny	2/5 stars
Rock Sound	7/10

Open Book was released following Fatherson's headline UK and highlands tour, with album launches occurring in Glasgow and London.

== Track listing ==
No.	Title	Length
1.	"Just Past the Point of Breaking"	4:02
2.	"Always"	3:11
3.	"Lost Little Boys"	3:20
4.	"Wondrous Heart"	4:11
5.	"Joanna"	3:40
6.	"Younger Days"	3:22
7.	"Open Book"	3:09
8.	"Forest"	3:51
9.	"Kids"	3:25
10.	"Stop the Car"	3:19
11.	"Sleeping Over"	4:13
12.	"Chasing Ghosts"	3:50
Total length:		42:23

== Charts ==
Chart (2016)	Peak position
UK Albums (OCC)	46
Scottish Albums (OCC)	2

== Release history ==
Country	Release date	Format	Label
United Kingdom	3 June 2016	CD, digital download, vinyl	Easy Life/Sony Records
