= White Men Are Black Men Too =

Studio album by Young Fathers
- Released: 6 April 2015
- Genres: Lo-fi; krautrock; hip-hop; industrial; world
- Length: 38:53
- Label: Big Dada

Young Fathers chronology
Dead (2014)	White Men Are Black Men Too (2015)	Cocoa Sugar (2018)

White Men Are Black Men Too is the second studio album by Scottish indie group Young Fathers. It was released on Big Dada on 6 April 2015. It peaked at number 41 on the UK Albums Chart.

== Critical reception ==
Professional ratings
Aggregate scores
Source	Rating
AnyDecentMusic?	8.1/10
Metacritic	83/100
Review scores
Source	Rating
AllMusic	4/5 stars
Cuepoint (Expert Witness)	A−
The Guardian	5/5 stars
The Independent	5/5 stars
Mojo	4/5 stars
NME	7/10
Pitchfork	6.8/10
Q	4/5 stars
Spin	8/10
Uncut	8/10

White Men Are Black Men Too received critical acclaim from contemporary music critics. At Metacritic, which assigns a weighted average score out of 100 to reviews and ratings from mainstream critics, the album received a metascore of 83, based on 21 reviews, indicating "universal acclaim".

Andy Gill of The Independent felt that the album "has less to do, musically, with traditional American hip-hop than it does with a European indie sensibility grounded in krautrock, electropop and avant-rock." Lanre Bakare of The Guardian commented that "[Young Fathers] manage the rare feat of melding pop and politics into a potent mix, and continue a tradition – begun by the likes of Smith & Mighty, Tricky and Massive Attack – of reinterpreting pop, hip-hop and soul through the filter of black British life." Writing for Exclaim!, Kyle Mullin called the record "a perfect storm of influences and talent." Jamie Milton of DIY gave the album 4 stars out of 5, calling it "Young Fathers' most fearless release yet." Pitchfork gave it a 6.8.

=== Accolades ===
Publication	Accolade	Year	Rank	Ref.
The Guardian	The Best Albums of 2015	2015	9	
NME	NME'S Albums of the Year 2015	2015	39	

== Track listing ==
No.	Title	Length
1.	"Still Running"	3:08
2.	"Shame"	4:09
3.	"Feasting"	2:39
4.	"27"	2:27
5.	"Rain or Shine"	3:49
6.	"Sirens"	3:00
7.	"Old Rock n Roll"	3:11
8.	"Nest"	3:17
9.	"Liberated"	2:55
10.	"John Doe"	2:52
11.	"Dare Me"	2:39
12.	"Get Started"	4:47
Total length:		38:53

== Chart positions ==
Chart (2015)	Peak position
UK Albums (Official Charts)	41
