= Dead (Young Fathers album) =

Studio album by Young Fathers
- Released: 31 January 2014
- Genre: Avant-pop; experimental pop; electronica; hip hop; synth-pop
- Length: 34:48
- Label: Anticon; Big Dada

Young Fathers chronology
Tape Two (2013)	Dead (2014)	White Men Are Black Men Too (2015)

Dead is the debut studio album by Scottish indie group Young Fathers. It was released on Anticon and Big Dada on 31 January 2014. The album was the winner of the 2014 Mercury Prize. It peaked at number 35 on the UK Albums Chart.

== Critical reception ==
Professional ratings
Aggregate scores
Source	Rating
AnyDecentMusic?	8.1/10
Metacritic	83/100
Review scores
Source	Rating
Clash	9/10
Christgau’s Consumer Guide	A−
DIY	4/5 stars
Drowned in Sound	7/10
The Guardian	4/5 stars
The Line of Best Fit	8/10
Mojo	4/5 stars
NME	7/10
The Observer	4/5 stars
PopMatters	8/10

Dead received critical acclaim from contemporary music critics. At Metacritic, which assigns a weighted average score out of 100 to reviews and ratings from mainstream critics, the album received a score of 83, based on 13 reviews, indicating "universal acclaim".

Clash magazine reviewers Felicity Martin and Mike Diver found that Dead was Young Fathers' "rawest, most emotion-heavy work to date" while noting that it "needed to represent progression without completely distancing itself from what'd come before. And that's a balance it strikes superbly." Joe Price, writing for DIY magazine, described the album as "an incredibly confident and gorgeously composed debut" that made for a "captivating listen". In his review for Drowned in Sound, Sam Moore praised the album's diversity, stating that "if you're looking for a thoroughly twenty-first-century record that'll challenge your preconceptions and bombard the senses, then Dead is something that's definitely worth your while" before offering the opinion that "it's a work that inescapably demands a response, a reaction. And that's a fine achievement for any debut album to rack up in this age of multimedia passivity." The musical diversity of the album also impressed Guardian reviewer Alexis Petridis, who said that "Young Fathers have quietly constructed a strange and intoxicating musical universe that feels entirely their own, while no one else was paying attention." The Line of Best Fit reviewer Jack Enright also found that the band had created "one of the most staggeringly exciting sounds of recent years", saying that "it's like nothing else out there."

Reviewing Dead for Scottish magazine The List, David Pollock described it as "a record which redefines the boundaries of UK hip hop and Scotland's artistic landscape in one fell swoop." Arwa Haider, writing for Metro, stated that the album "feels like a kind of coming-of-age: different and insistent from the strange, snappy lines of the first number 'No Way' to the gritty 'Mmmh Mmmh'." NME critic Phil Hebblethwaite praised Dead's "wild mash of sonic and lyrical styles" but described it as "an album that's unique, but maddeningly all over the place." Killian Fox, in his review for The Observer, noted that the band had "honour[ed] the Anticon sound while nudging it in more accessible directions" and stated that though "the balance between pop and experimentalism is very fine...Young Fathers strike it with exuberant ease." PopMatters reviewer Nathan Stevens was similarly impressed, remarking that "if Dead proves anything it's that Young Fathers are one of the most versatile acts in hip-hop today" and describing the album as "a dizzying thrill".

=== Accolades ===
Publication	Accolade	Rank	Ref.
The Guardian	Best Albums of 2014	17	
The Skinny	Albums of 2014	10	

== Track listing ==
No.	Title	Length
1.	"No Way"	2:50
2.	"Low"	3:11
3.	"Just Another Bullet"	2:37
4.	"War"	2:50
5.	"Get Up"	4:06
6.	"Dip"	3:03
7.	"Paying"	3:12
8.	"Mmmh Mmmh"	3:31
9.	"Hangman"	2:53
10.	"Am I Not Your Boy"	3:08
11.	"I've Arrived"	3:23
Total length:		34:48

== Chart positions ==
Chart (2014)	Peak position
Belgian Albums (Ultratop Flanders)	102
Scottish Albums (OCC)	21
UK Albums (OCC)	35
UK Album Downloads (OCC)	24
UK Independent Albums (OCC)	1
UK R&B Albums (OCC)	1
