= Young Fathers =

Scottish hip-hop and pop group

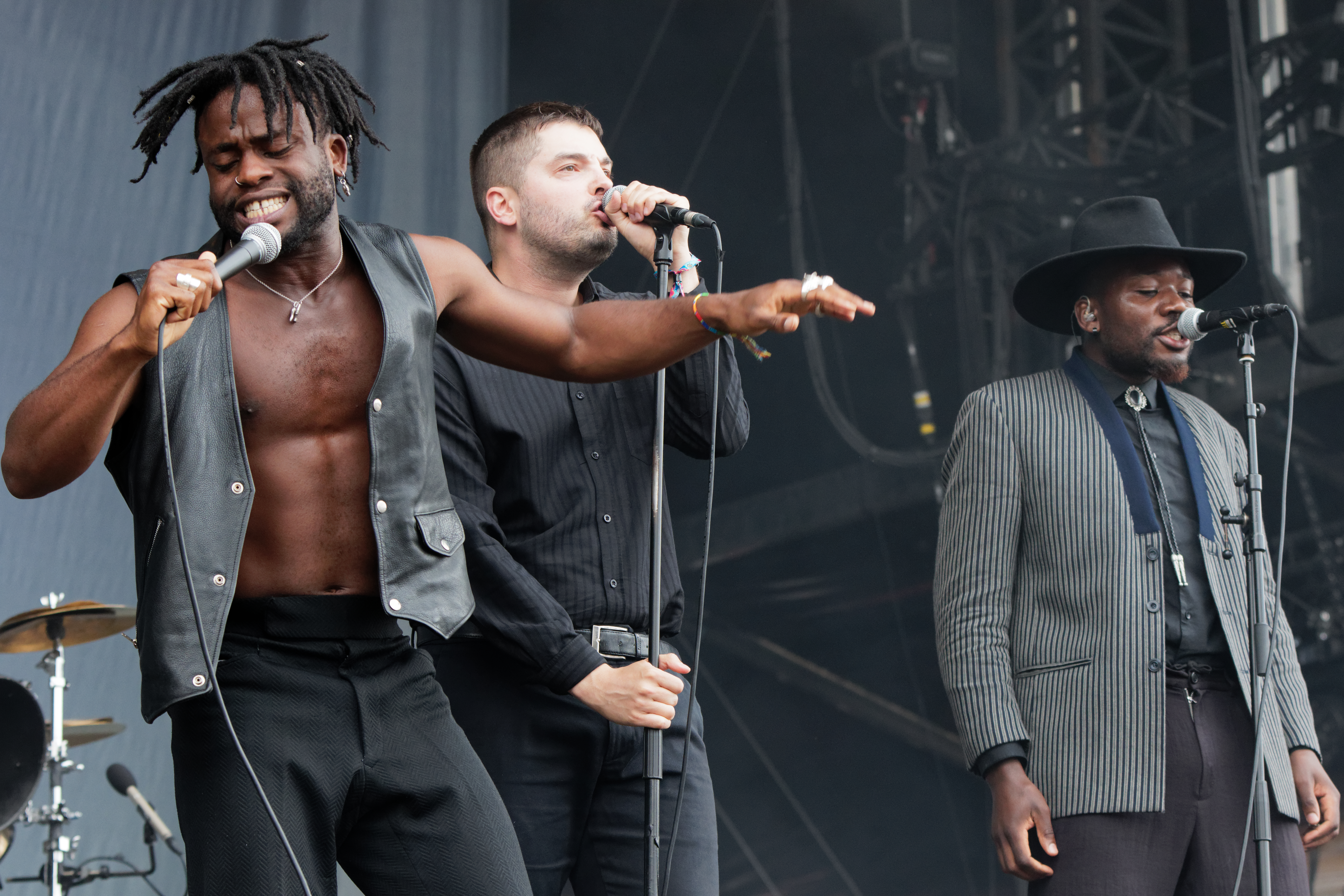
- Young Fathers in 2018

Background information
- Origin: Edinburgh, Scotland
- Genres: Art pop; indietronica; alternative hip-hop; soul
- Years active: 2008–present
- Labels: Ninja Tune; Big Dada; Anticon
- Members: Alloysious Massaquoi; Kayus Bankole; 'G' Hastings
- Website: young-fathers.com

Young Fathers are a Scottish progressive hip-hop group formed in Edinburgh in 2008. Their second EP, Tape Two (2013), won the Scottish Album of the Year Award. In 2014, they won the Mercury Prize for their debut album Dead. A second album, White Men Are Black Men Too, followed in 2015. Their third album, Cocoa Sugar (2018), peaked at number 28 on the UK Albums Chart and earned the band their second Scottish Album of the Year Award. Their fourth album, Heavy Heavy, was released in 2023 and earned the band their third Scottish Album of the Year Award. The band composed the soundtrack for the 2025 horror film 28 Years Later.

== History ==
Formed in Edinburgh in 2000s by Alloysious Massaquoi, Kayus Bankole and Graham 'G' Hastings, the group started performing in nightclubs when the band members were all in their teens. In 2005, the trio released a single under the name 3Style prior to becoming Young Fathers in 2008.

In 2012, they signed to LA-based label Anticon and released their introductory mixtapes, Tape One and Tape Two, with Tape Two winning the Scottish Album of the Year Award ("The SAY Award").

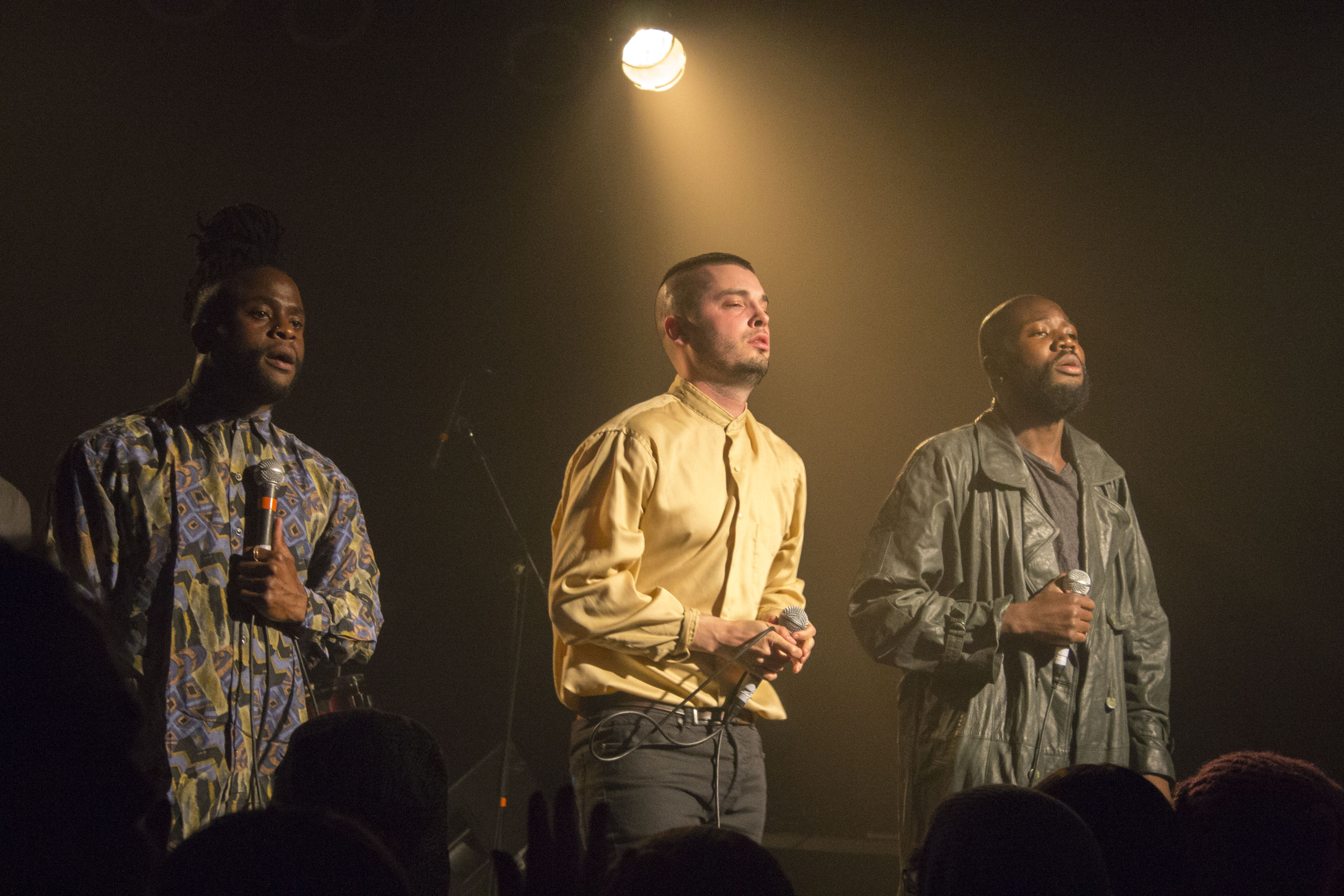
Young Fathers in concert 27 April 2014

The trio then signed to Big Dada and released their debut album, Dead, which was released in 2014. The album gained critical attention and went on to win the Mercury Prize. Dead entered the UK albums chart at number 35 and topped the independent UK album chart.

Following an extensive world tour the band decamped to Berlin to begin work on their second album, White Men Are Black Men Too, which was released in April 2015. It peaked at number 41 on the UK Albums Chart.

In June 2017 Young Fathers played in the Royal Festival Hall at the Southbank Centre as part of M.I.A.'s Meltdown Festival.

Six tracks on the T2 Trainspotting soundtrack feature Young Fathers, including "Only God Knows", written specifically for the film. In a statement the director Danny Boyle described the song as "the heartbeat for the film".

Young Fathers' third studio album, Cocoa Sugar, was announced with the single "In My View" on 17 January 2018. The album was released on British independent label Ninja Tune on 9 March 2018. The album entered the UK Albums Chart at number 28, making it the band's highest-charting album. It won the Scottish Album of the Year Award for 2018.

The trio released their fourth studio album, Heavy Heavy, via Ninja Tune on 3 February 2023. The album peaked at number 7 on the UK Albums Chart, won the Scottish Album of the Year Award, earned the band three Brit Award nominations and was also shortlisted for the Mercury Prize.

While not an overtly political band, Young Fathers have spoken about issues such as racism and the treatment of refugees. Due to their support of the BDS movement, the band was dropped from the 2018 Ruhrtriennale line-up.

The band were featured on the FIFA 19 and FIFA 23 soundtracks, with the songs "Border Girl" and "Rice" respectively.

In May 2025, the group announced that they had composed the score for Danny Boyle's horror sequel 28 Years Later. The film was released in the UK on 20 June 2025 to positive reviews.

== Members ==
- Alloysious Massaquoi (vocals, percussion) was born in Liberia and moved to Edinburgh at the age of four, where he attended Boroughmuir High School.
- Kayus Bankole (vocals) was born in Edinburgh to Nigerian parents. He spent several years living in Maryland and Nigeria before moving back to the city of his birth, in his teens. He went on to attend Boroughmuir High School in Edinburgh, the same school as Alloysious and the two became close friends. Bankole has commented that Scotland's history in relation to slavery should be taught in schools to help overcome systemic racism.
- Graham "G" Hastings (vocals, production) was born in Edinburgh and grew up in the North Edinburgh housing scheme of Drylaw.
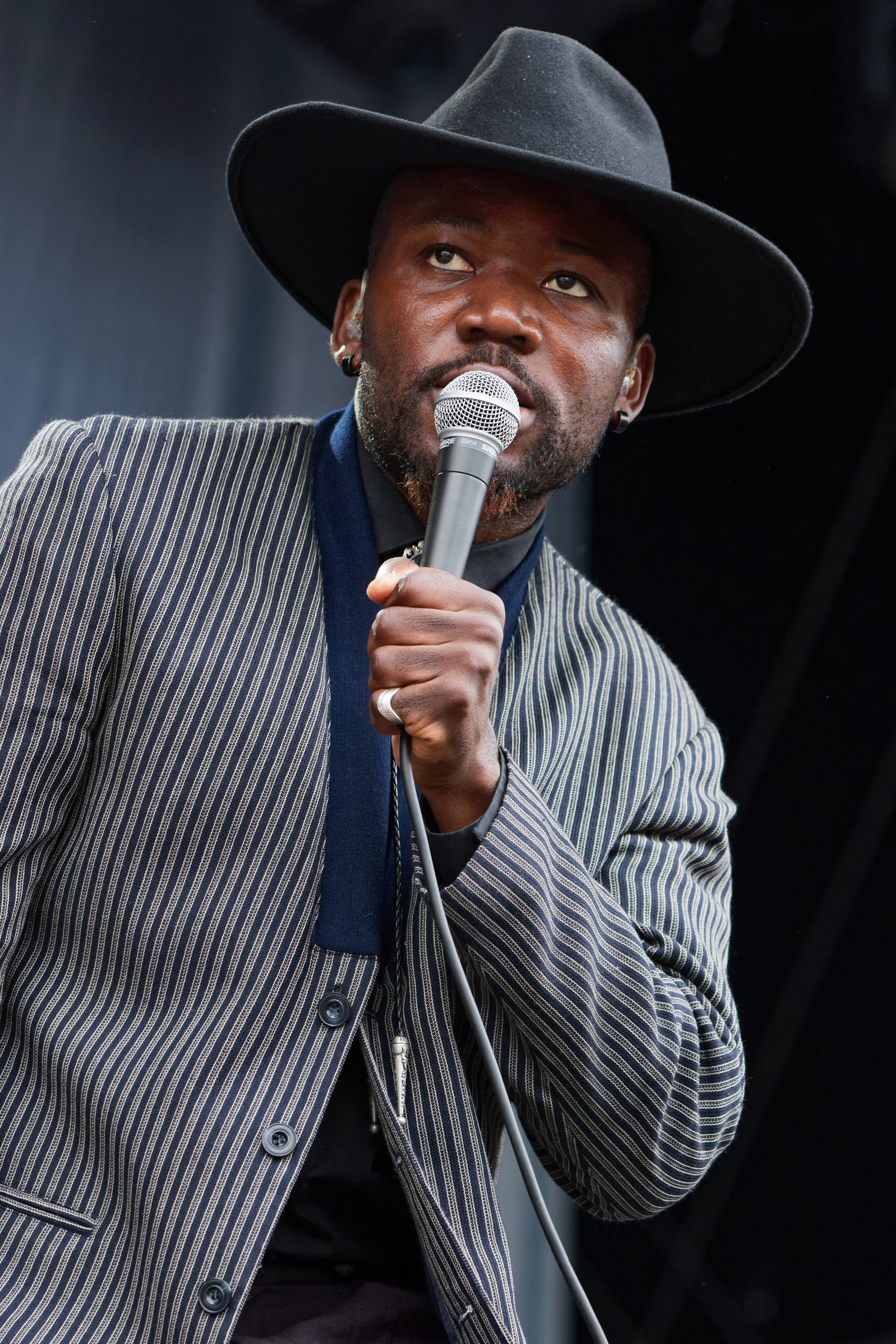
Alloysious Massaquoi

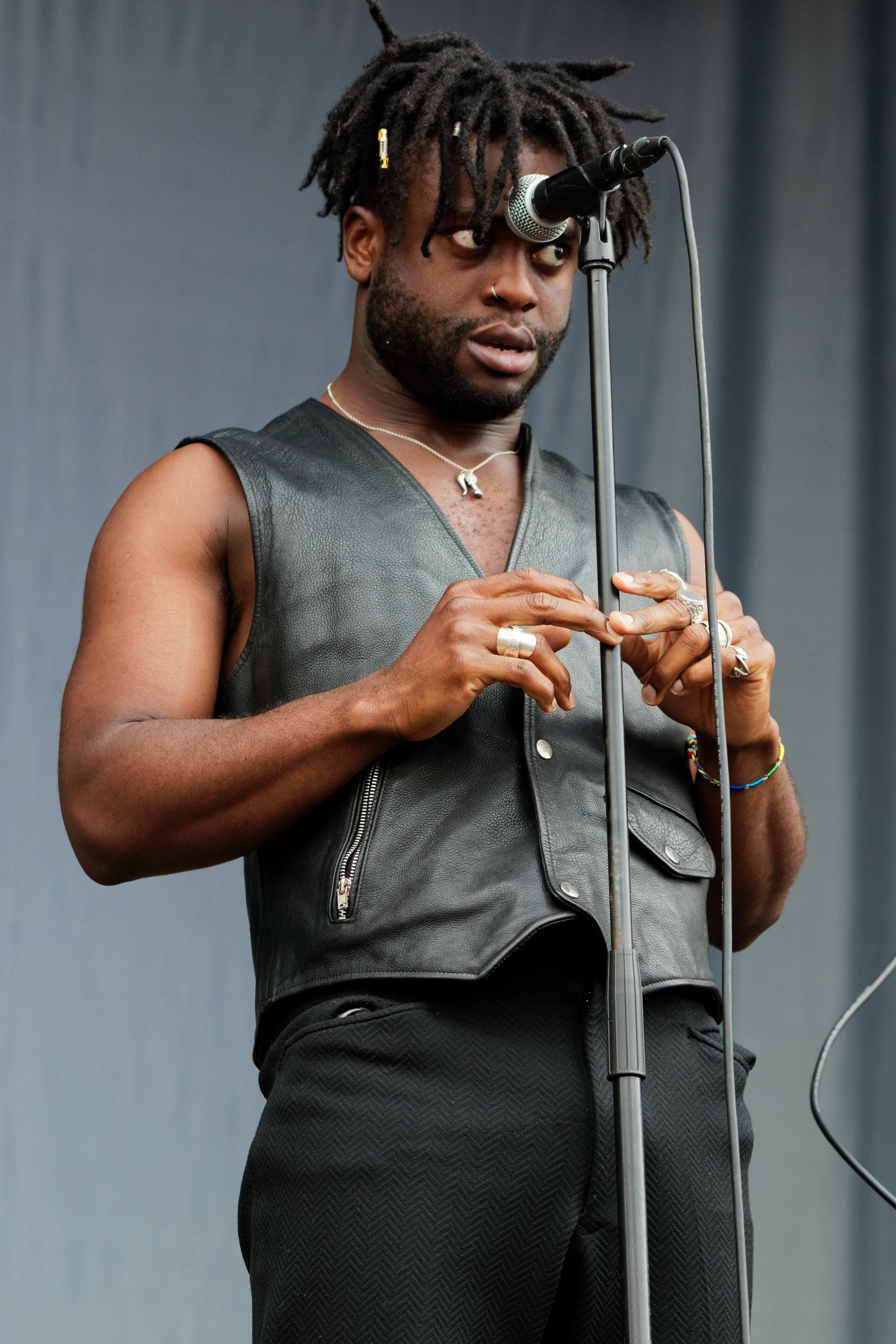
Kayus Bankole

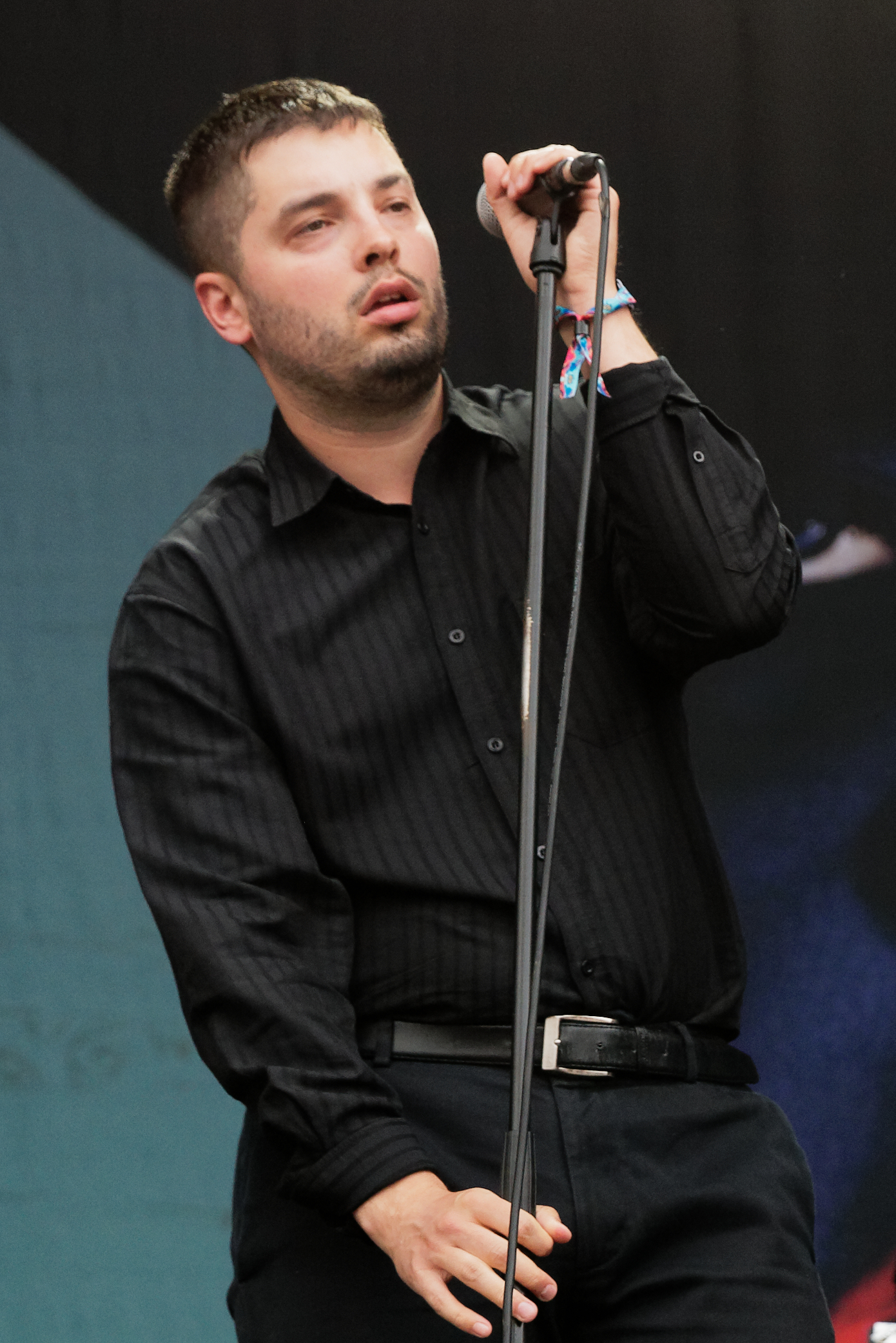
Graham "G" Hastings

Touring musicians

- Steven Morrison – drums (2009–present)
- Edwin McLachlan – drums (2023)
- Kimberley Mandido – backing vocals (2023–present)
- Amber Joy – backing vocals (2023–present)
- Callum Easter – guitar, keyboards (2023–present)

== Discography ==
=== Studio albums ===
Title	Album details	Peak chart positions									
Title	Album details	SCO	UK	UK Indie	AUS Hit.	BEL (FL)	BEL (WA)	GER	IRL	SWI	US Sales
Dead	Released: 31 January 2014; Label: Anticon, Big Dada	21	35	1	—	102	—	—	—	—	—
White Men Are Black Men Too	Released: 6 April 2015; Label: Big Dada	19	41	6	20	95	—	—	—	—	—
Cocoa Sugar	Released: 9 March 2018; Label: Ninja Tune	9	28	4	13	37	173	—	79	89	— (Note: Cocoa Sugar did not enter the US Billboard 200, but peaked at number 14 on the US Heatseekers Albums Chart.)
Heavy Heavy	Released: 3 February 2023; Label: Ninja Tune	2	7	2	— (Note: Heavy Heavy did not enter the ARIA Albums chart, but peaked at number 23 on the Australian Digital Albums Chart.)	73	—	98	84	—	65
"—" denotes a recording that did not chart or was not released in that territory.

=== Mixtapes ===
Title	Album details
Tape One	Released: November 2011; Label: Anticon
Tape Two	Released: 11 June 2013; Label: Anticon

=== Soundtracks ===
Title	Album details	Peak chart positions		
Title	Album details	SCO	UK DL	UK OST
28 Years Later	Released: 20 June 2025; Label: Milan Records	85	43	12

=== Singles ===
Title	Year	Peak chart positions			Album
Title	Year	UK Sales	UK Indie	FRA	Album
"Straight Back on It"	2008	—	—	—	Non-album singles
"Automatic / Dancing Mantaray"	2010	—	—	—	Non-album singles
"Fevers Worse"	2010	—	—	—	Non-album singles
"The Guide"	2013	—	—	—	Non-album singles
"I Heard"	2013	—	—	196	Tape Two
"Queen Is Dead"	2013	9	—	—	Tape Two
"Low"	2013	—	—	—	Dead
"Get Up"	2014	—	39	—	Dead
"Soon Come Soon"	2014	63	—	—	Non-album single
"Rain or Shine"	2015	—	—	—	White Men Are Black Men Too
"Shame"	2015	—	—	—	White Men Are Black Men Too
"Only God Knows" (featuring Leith Congregational Choir)	2017	5	—	—	T2: Trainspotting
"Lord"	2018	—	—	—	Cocoa Sugar
"In My View"	2018	—	—	—	Cocoa Sugar
"Toy"	2018	—	—	—	Cocoa Sugar
"Border Girl / Cocoa Sugar"	2018	—	—	—	Non-album single
"Geronimo"	2022	—	—	—	Heavy Heavy
"I Saw"	2022	—	—	—	Heavy Heavy
"Tell Somebody"	2022	—	—	—	Heavy Heavy
"Rice"	2023	—	—	—	Heavy Heavy
"—" denotes a recording that did not chart or was not released in that territory.

=== Remixes ===
- "Girlfriend (Young Fathers Remix)" by Phoenix from Wolfgang Amadeus Phoenix (Remix Collection) (2009)
- "Nicotine Love (StraightFace Remix)" by Tricky (2014)

=== Guest appearances ===
Title	Other artist(s)	Year	Album/EP
"Turn Up the Dial"	Simian Mobile Disco	2009	Temporary Pleasure
"Leader"	Stanton Warriors	2011	The Warriors
"Voodoo in My Blood"	Massive Attack	2016	Ritual Spirit
"He Says He Needs Me"	3D	2016	Assassin's Creed (Original Motion Picture Soundtrack)
"#UNIVERSALBASICINCOME"	Massive Attack, Guy Standing	2020	Eutopia

=== Music videos ===
Title	Year
"Deadline"	2012
"Rumbling"	2012
"Sister"	2012
"Romance"	2013
"The Guide"	2013
"I Heard"	2013
"Queen Is Dead"	2013
"Low"	2013
"Get Up"	2014
"Shame"	2015
"Old Rock n Roll"	2015
"Lord"	2018
"In My View"	2018
"Toy"	2018
"Holy Ghost"	2018

== Awards and nominations ==
2016: Berlin Music Video Awards, nominated in the Best Performer category for 'VOODOO IN MY BLOOD'
