= I Am an Island =

Studio album by Fatherson
- Released: April 7, 2014
- Genre: Alternative rock, indie rock
- Length: 44:29
- Label: A Modern Way
- Producer: Bruce Rintoul

Fatherson chronology
I Am an Island (2014)	Open Book (2016)

I Am an Island is the debut studio album from Scottish alternative rock band Fatherson and was released April 7, 2014. The album includes the singles "I Like Not Knowing" and "Mine for Me".

== Singles ==
- "I Like Not Knowing" was released as the album's lead single on March 26, 2014.
- "Mine for Me" was released as the album's second single on July 9, 2014.

== Track listing ==
No.	Title	Length
1.	"An Island"	3:14
2.	"Hometown"	3:23
3.	"I Like Not Knowing"	3:21
4.	"Cat Stevens"	3:30
5.	"Lights"	3:08
6.	"Mine for Me"	3:00
7.	"Half The Things"	3:30
8.	"Dust"	3:38
9.	"James"	4:57
10.	"Kiteers"	2:56
11.	"Foreign Waters"	14:13

== Release history ==
Country	Release date	Format	Label
United Kingdom	7 April 2014	Digital download	A Modern Way
United Kingdom	7 April 2014	CD	A Modern Way
