= Tom Hingston =

British graphic designer

Hingston in April 2018

Tom Hingston (born 1973) is a British graphic designer and creative director working in London. He is most well known for his collaborative design work with musicians, both as cover and promotional art as well as music videos.

== Early work ==
Following a degree at Central St Martins, in the late 1990s he worked with art director Neville Brody. After leaving Brody's in 1997 he designed posters and sleeves for the Blue Note Club in London's Hoxton Square. It was during this period that Hingston was first introduced to the band Massive Attack, with whom he developed a long term creative relationship, collaborating on all of the band's artwork, most notably for the Mezzanine, created with photographer Nick Knight and frontman Robert Del Naja.

== Collaboration in music and film ==
Hingston has collaborated with many musicians and artists, including Grace Jones, for whom he created life-size casts in chocolate, Nick Cave, Lady Gaga, The Rolling Stones, Chemical Brothers, Young Fathers and Robbie Williams. He has also directed three music videos for David Bowie, for "I'd Rather Be High" from The Next Day, the single "Sue (Or In A Season of Crime)" and the posthumous promo for No Plan. Through moving image work, Hingston has partnered in a number of film title collaborations with directors such as Joe Wright for Darkest Hour, Pan, Pride & Prejudice, Atonement, Hannah and Anna Karenina; and Anton Corbijn for Control, A Most Wanted Man and Life.

== Other work ==
Hingston's work outside music covers a broad spectrum of brands from fashion and lifestyle, to architecture and technology. His work can be found in and magazines on the subject of music, visual culture and design and has been exhibited at a number of galleries and institutions including the Design Museum, The Barbican, Saatchi Gallery and the Victoria and Albert Museum.

His design studio, Hingston Studio opened in 1997 and has won a number of awards for work in graphic design, typography and creative direction. In 2018 he was appointed as curator for the acclaimed Veuve Clicquot Widow Series, bringing together some of the Studio's long standing friends and collaborators including Nick Knight, Warren Du Preez and Nick Thornton Jones, Chris Levine, Liam Hodges, Jehnny Beth and James Lavelle in an immersive four-floor exhibition of art, film, sound and light installation. The project was awarded a pencil by D&AD for exhibition design. In 2019 Hingston Studio was commissioned to design a new visual identity for the Serpentine Galleries intended to coincide with the galleries' 50th anniversary.

In 2002 Hingston wrote and art directed the book Porn?, a compendium of work by photographers and artists, in collaboration with Dazed (formerly Dazed & Confused Magazine).

== Writings ==
- Hingston, Tom. Porn? London: Vision On, 2002. ISBN 9780953747979
- Mason, Daniel, and Tom Hingston. Tom Hingston Studio. Tokyo: DesignEXchange, 2002. ISBN 9784860832643
