= Fatherson =

Scottish alternative rock band

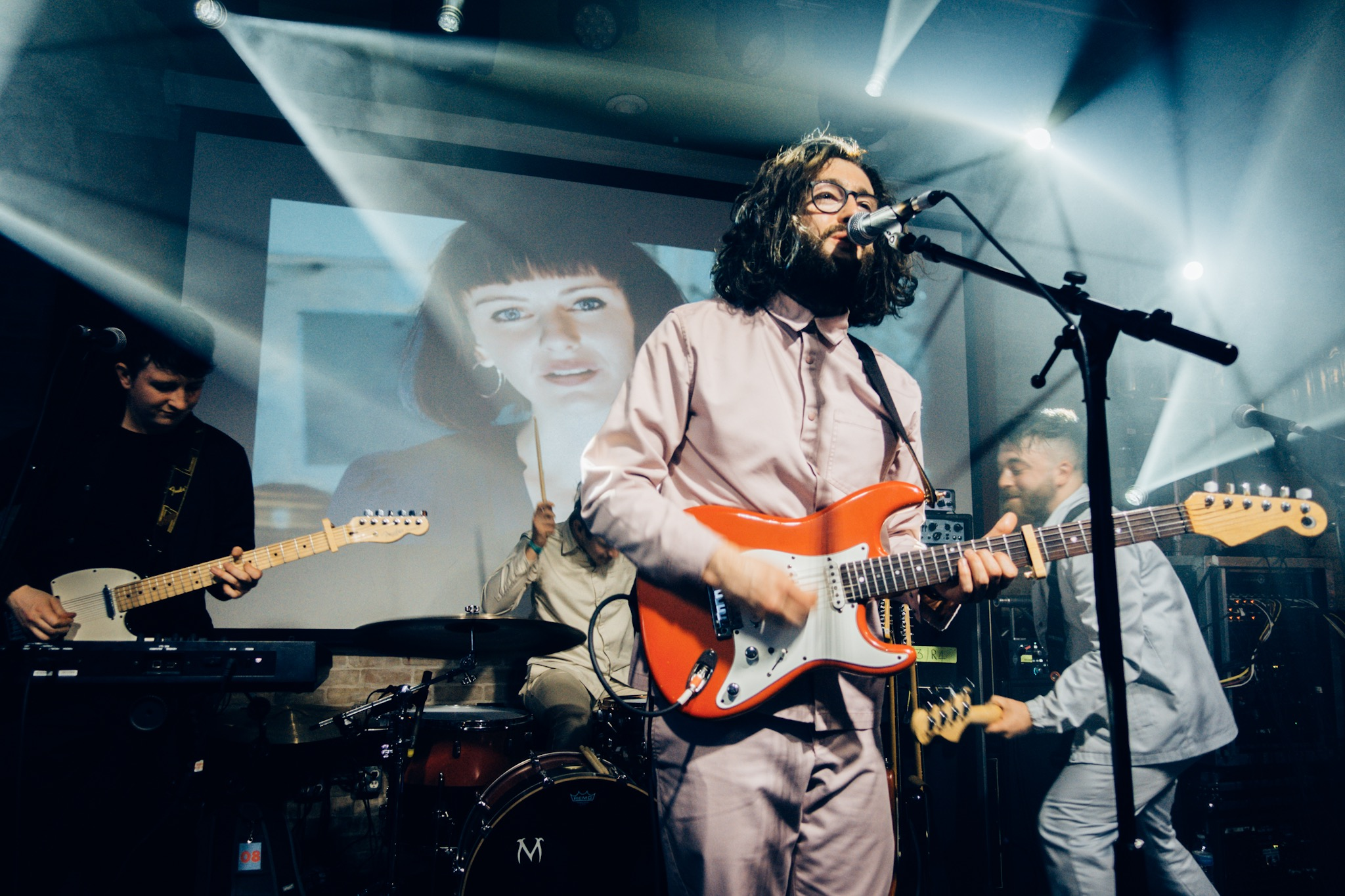
- Left to right: Greg Walkinshaw, Ross Leighton and Marc Strain in a promotional image

Background information
- Origin: Kilmarnock, Scotland
- Genres: Alternative rock, indie, rock
- Years active: 2010–present
- Labels: Easy Life, Sony Music UK, A Modern Way
- Members: Ross Leighton; Marc Strain; Greg Walkinshaw
- Website: fathersonband.com

Fatherson is a Scottish alternative rock band formed in Kilmarnock, consisting of Ross Leighton (guitar, lead vocals), Marc Strain (bass) and Greg Walkinshaw (drums). They have toured with the bands Biffy Clyro, Frightened Rabbit, Panic! at the Disco, Feeder, Twin Atlantic, Enter Shikari and Idlewild. The band have so far released four studio albums, I Am an Island (2014), Open Book (2016), Sum Of All Your Parts (2018) and Normal Fears (2022).

All four of their studio albums have reached the top 20 in the Scottish Albums Chart, with Open Book, Sum Of All Your Parts and Normal Fears reaching the top 5 in Scotland. In the United Kingdom, three of their albums have appeared in the UK Top 100 Albums Charts.

== Career ==
=== Early career and I Am an Island (2011–2014) ===
Fatherson have released two singles. "Hometown", through King Tuts Recordings, and in 2012 "First Born". Following the inclusion of a song on BBC Radio 1's Introducing playlist, the band performed on the BBC Introducing stage at T in the Park where their set was aired on BBC Two. Further festival appearances during the summer culminated in a trip to America for an industry showcase.

Fatherson completed 2012 with their biggest tour to date playing venues such as The Garage in Glasgow, the Liquid Rooms in Edinburgh and The Ironworks in Inverness. In 2013, in-between recording their debut album, the band played around the country including appearances at The Great Escape in Brighton, This Is Fake DIY at The Old Blue Last in London, Stag & Dagger at the ABC 1 in Glasgow and the Main Stage at Rockness.

In 2014, the band released their debut album I Am an Island through a record label set up by their management. The band and label worked together to independently finance and release the record without the standard record company structure. The release was a success and went to No.11 in the Scottish Album Chart, Top 40 UK Indie charts and peaked at No.5 on the iTunes alternative chart. The first single "I Like Not Knowing" received airplay throughout BBC Radio 1 with support from DJs such as Greg James, Zane Lowe, Huw Stephens and Ally McCrae. The band then toured throughout the UK pulling their biggest audiences to date, culminating in a sold-out show at Glasgow's Arches.

Fatherson played at festivals throughout the UK and performed again at T in the Park, this time at King Tut's Tent. The band has embarked on a UK and European tour supporting We Were Promised Jetpacks and released a new single "Mine For Me" on 21 July 2014. As confirmed at their performance at the Tartan Heart Festival in August, 2015, they are currently producing their second studio album. They are supporting the synth-pop trio PRIDES on their UK Headline Tour in October and November 2015.

=== Open Book (2016–2018) ===
In February 2016 the band embarked on a tour of the UK beginning on the 11th in Dundee's Reading Rooms playing singles from their upcoming second album including "Lost Little Boys" also released that month. They then played shows in Edinburgh's Liquid Rooms and Newcastle's Cluny 2 along with other UK cities. In May 2016 the band released their third single from their new album "Just Past the Point of Breaking"

In June 2016, the band released their second album Open Book through their new record label Easy Life, a subdivision of Sony Music UK. The band celebrated the release with a tour of the Scottish highlands and album launch parties in Glasgow and London. In the week following Open Book's release the band appeared on BBC Radio Scotland and STV Glasgow to discuss the album.

=== Sum Of All Your Parts (2018–2022) ===
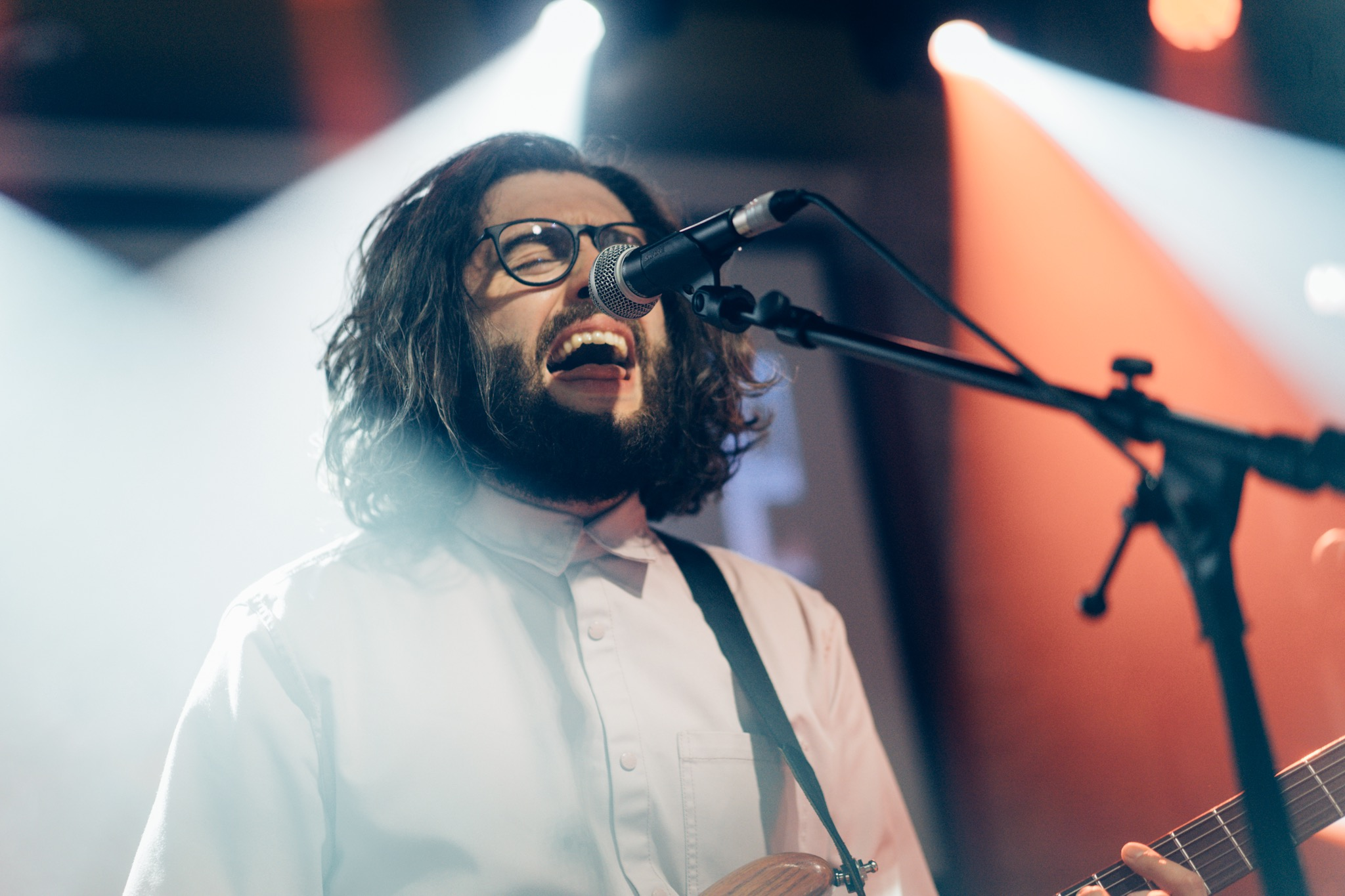
Lead singer Ross Leighton performing live in 2019

Fatherson released their third studio album, Sum Of All Your Parts on September 14, 2018, via Easy Life Records. The lead single from the album "Making Waves" was released, with Leighton performing an acoustic version of the song at the 2018 TRNSMT festival at Glasgow Green. Making Waves was followed up with singles Charm School and Reflection.

Sum Of All Your Parts was released to favourable reviews and was a considerable success for the band. In their native Scotland, the album debuted at #3 on the Scottish Albums Chart. In the United Kingdom, it enjoyed moderate success on the UK Albums Chart, debuting at #67 and spent a total of one week on the chart before dropping out of the Top 100 albums.

=== Normal Fears (2022–present) ===
In April 2022, the band released their fourth studio album Normal Fears. It achieved considerable success in their native Scotland, charting at #2 on the Scottish Albums Chart and in the United Kingdom achieved moderate success, where it debuted at #47, spending one week on the UK Albums Chart.

On 23 July 2022, they were headliners at the Making Waves Music Festival, a new music festival held in the Ayrshire town of Irvine.

== Band members ==
=== Current ===
- Ross Leighton: Guitar, lead vocals (2010–present)
- Marc Strain: Bass (2010–present)
- Greg Walkinshaw: Drums (2010–present)

=== Previous ===
- Chris Beltran: Guitar, keyboard, backing vocals (2010-2015)

=== Live ===
- Elaine Glass: Cello, backing vocals (2010-2014)
- Andy Black: Guitar, keyboard, backing vocals (2015-2016)
- Kris Platt: Guitar, keyboard, backing vocals (2017)
- Ciaran McEneny: Guitar, keyboard, backing vocals (2018–present)

== Discography ==
=== Studio albums ===
Title	Details	Peak chart positions	
Title	Details	UK	SCO
I Am an Island	Released: 7 April 2014; Label: A Modern Way; Formats: CD, digital download	—	11
Open Book	Released: 3 June 2016; Label: Easy Life, Sony Music; Formats: CD, digital download	46	2
Sum Of All Your Parts	Released: 14 September 2018; Label: Easy Life, Sony Music; Formats: Vinyl LP, CD, digital download	67	3
Normal Fears	Released: 1 April 2022; Label: Easy Life; Formats: Vinyl LP, CD, cassette, digital download	47	2

=== Extended plays ===
- Where the Water Meets the Land (2010)
- Hometown (2011, King Tuts Recordings)
- Sum of All Your Parts (Reimagined) (2019, Easy Life Records)

=== Singles ===
- "First Born" (2012)
- "Mine for Me" (2014, A Modern Way)
- "I Like Not Knowing" (2014)
- "Always" (2015, Easy Life/Sony Music UK)
- "Lost Little Boys" (2016)
- "Just Past the Point of Breaking" (2016)
- "Making Waves" (2018)
- "Charm School" (2018)
- "Reflection" (2018)
- "Honest to God" (2021)
- "Dive" (2022)
- "Better Friend" (2022)
