= We Were Made Prey =

Studio album by Kathryn Joseph
- Released: 30 May 2025
- Studio: Black Bay Studios, Isle of Lewis, Scotland
- Length: 39:04
- Label: Rock Action
- Producer: Lomond Campbell; Kathryn Joseph

Kathryn Joseph chronology
For You Who Are the Wronged (2022)	We Were Made Prey (2025)

Singles from We Were Made Prey
- 1. "Harbour" Released: 11 March 2025; 2. "Deer" Released: 17 April 2025; 3. "Wolf" Released: 14 May 2025

We Were Made Prey is the fourth studio album by Scottish singer-songwriter Kathryn Joseph. It was released on 30 May 2025, by Rock Action Records, in LP, CD and digital formats.

== Background ==
We Were Made Prey was produced by Lomond Campbell, at the Black Bay Studios on the Isle of Lewis. The album consists of eleven tracks with a total runtime of approximately thirty-nine minutes. Its first single, "Harbour", was released on 11 March 2025, alongside a music video. The second single, "Deer", was released on 17 April 2025. It was followed by the third single, "Wolf", on 14 May 2025.

== Reception ==
Professional ratings
Review scores
Source	Rating
The Line of Best Fit	8/10
MusicOMH	4.5/5 stars
The Skinny	4/5 stars

MusicOMH rated the album four and a half stars, stating "it may not be the place to come to if you want an album of singalong tunes, but the raw emotion that Joseph and Campbell can conjure up is something to behold," and describing it as "an intense, haunting listen."

The Line of Best Fit assigned it a rating of eight out of ten, calling We Were Made Prey "Joseph’s most entrancing release, a project that puts her Hobbesian vision and poetic leanings on full and unadulterated display".

The Skinny gave the album a four-star rating and remarked, "The animalistic spaces Joseph occupies are tethered to her original mix: the incongruence of tragedy told in gentle, softer tones. We Were Made Prey forgets this and conjures, eerily, even more delicate ways to doubt, rage and come to terms with being."

== Track listing ==
All tracks are written by Kathryn Joseph and Lomond Campbell.

We Were Made Prey track listing
No.	Title	Length
1.	"Wolf"	3:45
2.	"Dark"	4:31
3.	"Harbour"	3:53
4.	"Bel (II)"	1:26
5.	"Before"	3:06
6.	"Deer"	4:24
7.	"Drawn"	3:20
8.	"Roadkill"	3:50
9.	"Hold"	4:26
10.	"Children"	3:04
11.	"Fire"	3:19
Total length:		39:04

== Personnel ==
Credits adapted from the album's liner notes.

- Kathryn Joseph – vocals, keyboards, piano, production, cover photography
- Lomond Campbell – synthesisers, drum programming, production, design, layout
- Pete Fletcher – mixing, engineering
- Alex Wharton – mastering
- Cal Roden – engineering assistance
- DLT – design, layout

== Charts ==
Chart performance for We Were Made Prey
Chart (2025)	Peak position
Scottish Albums (OCC)	5
UK Album Downloads (OCC)	38
UK Independent Albums (OCC)	15
