= Corto.alto =

Scottish jazz music project

corto.alto is a music project formed in Glasgow by multi-instrumentalist Liam Shortall.

The debut album Bad with Names was shortlisted for the 2024 Mercury Prize for Album of the Year. Shortall has some Spanish ancestry and the moniker corto.alto in Spanish translates as short.tall (a pun on his last name, Shortall).

== Personnel ==
The band comprises Liam Shortall (trombone, bass guitar, effects), Graham Costello (drums) from STRATA, Fergus McCreadie (keys) and various horn players including James Copus, Harry Weir and Mateusz Sobieski.

== Awards and nominations ==
Year	Award	Category	Nominee(s)	Result	Ref.
2020	Scottish Jazz Awards	Best Band	corto.alto	Won	
2020	Scottish Jazz Awards	Best Album	Live from 435 Vols 1, 2 & 3	Won	
2021	Scottish Awards for New Music	Mark McKergow Award for Innovation in Jazz	Liam Shortall	Won	
2023	Scottish Jazz Awards	Best Band	corto.alto	Won	
2024	Mercury Prize	Album of the Year	Bad with Names	Shortlisted	
