= Sum of All Your Parts =

Studio album by Fatherson
- Released: 14 September 2018
- Recorded: April 2017 – January 2018
- Studios: The Chairworks (Castleford, West Yorkshire; Citadel of Mayhem
- Length: 42:26
- Labels: Easy Life, Sony Music
- Producer: Claudius Mittendorfer

Fatherson chronology
Open Book (2016)	Sum of All Your Parts (2018)	Sum of All Your Parts (Reimagined) (2019)

Singles from Sum of All Your Parts
- 1. "Making Waves" Released: 22 June 2018; 2. "Charm School" Released: 1 August 2018; 3. "Reflection" Released: 30 August 2018; 4. "Ghost" Released: 9 March 2019

Sum of All Your Parts is the third album by Scottish alternative rock band Fatherson, released on 14 September 2018 through Easy Life Records. The album was announced on June 22, 2018 alongside the release of the first single "Making Waves".

The album was followed by an EP called Sum of All Your Parts (Reimagined), which was released on 11 January 2019, and featured re-imagined versions of the tracks "Making Waves", "Gratitude", "Ghost" and "Charm School".

== Background ==
The band began working on the album while on tour in early 2017. The band set to create something completely different from their previous release. To produce the album they hired Claudius Mittendorfer, who had previously worked with Weezer, Against Me!, Arctic Monkeys, Foo Fighters, Panic! At the Disco, Paul Simon, Sting and The Wombats. The band began working with him through conversations via Skype before they started recording in Castleford. The album was recorded completely live and in sequence rather than using traditional multi-track recording methods to capture the communal sound lost when recording the instruments separately.

== Composition ==
While writing the album lead singer, Ross Leighton, followed a "found sound" approach to making music where he would record a sound and try and fit it into the song. This is displayed in the opening track "The Rain" which features a sample of an electric radiator. Leighton described the album's lyrical content as "less coded than the records before," describing it as more personal than "Open Book" and its general theme being "a bit more tongue in cheek about how things are affecting me."

The first song written for the album was the lead single "Making Waves" which the band considered a safety net and the first jumping point for the sound of the album. Leighton described the track as a "heart on your sleeve slacker tune with a tonne of groove." Leighton described the song as being a Weezer homage and said it is "about falling in love with someone that you don’t want to lose." The second single from the album "Charm School" was released on August 1, 2018 which the band described as being "an observation on having to mind your p’s and q’s all the time – and the need to jump through hoops for other people." The main riff of "Charm School" was written by the band's touring guitarist and the band built the entire song around the base of the riff. The fourth single from the album "Ghost" was described as displaying the band's "knack for both subtle, intricate guitar lines and cacophonous, payoff riffs worth every moment of tension building." Leighton described it as being "four songs smashed into one" and based the lyrics about the band's hometown.

== Critical reception ==
Professional ratings
Review scores
Source	Rating
Clash	8/10
Dork	3/5 stars
The Skinny	5/5 stars
Shropshire Star	8/10

Sum Of All Your Parts received positive reviews upon its release. Amy Kenyon with 'The Skinny' described the album as "raw and immersive, leaving soft but long-lasting impressions with the listener that intensify with every listen." Leigh Sanders with the 'Shropshire Star' described the album's sound as "all-encompassing" and praises bassist Marc Strain's basslines for "creating an atmosphere without taking over." Mark Mcconville of God is in the TV praised the album for "extensively scraping away the sinew of old memories and welcoming new ones."

== Track listing ==
No.	Title	Writer(s)	Length
1.	"The Rain"	Fatherson	3:59
2.	"Making Waves"	Fatherson	3:32
3.	"Graditude"	Fatherson, Mark 'Duck' Blackwell	3:37
4.	"Nothing to No One" (featuring Bryde)	Fatherson	4:44
5.	"Oh Yes"	Fatherson, Isaiah Hull	5:19
6.	"The Landscape"	Fatherson	3:25
7.	"Ghost"	Fatherson	4:02
8.	"Reflection"	Fatherson	5:14
9.	"Charm School"	Fatherson, Daniel Morgan Ball, Kristoffer Platt	3:30
10.	"Building a Wall"	Fatherson	5:09
Total length:			42:26

== Personnel ==
Credits adapted from the album's liner notes.

Fatherson

- Ross Leighton – vocals, guitar
- Marc Strain – bass guitar
- Greg Walkinshaw – drums

Additional personnel

- Bryde – vocals on track 4
- Isaiah Hull – sampled on track 5
- Claudius Mittendorfer – producer, mixing, recording engineer
- John Davis – mastering engineer
- Kris Platt – artwork, design
- Glenn Kennedy – artwork, design
- Gred Kantra – photography

== Charts ==
Chart (2018)	Peak position
Scottish Albums (Official Charts)	3
UK Albums (Official Charts)	67
UK Independent Albums (Official Charts)	12
