= Still, Here =

Studio album by Marisa Anderson
- Released: September 23, 2022
- Genre: Blues, folk
- Length: 33:48
- Label: Thrill Jockey

Marisa Anderson chronology
Lost Futures (with William Tyler) (2021)	Still, Here (2022)	Swallowtail (with Jim White) (2024)

Singles from Still, Here
- 1. "Waking" Released: June 16, 2022; 2. "La Llorona" Released: August 8, 2022; 3. "The Fire This Time" Released: September 8, 2022

Still, Here is the tenth studio album by Portland guitarist Marisa Anderson, released September 23, 2022, by Thrill Jockey. The eight-track album consists of six original compositions and two arrangements of traditional songs. Anderson recorded every instrument, including multiple keyboards and numerous guitars, herself.

== Background ==
The album was announced June 16 along with the release of lead single "Waking". Second single "La Llorona", an arrangement of a traditional Mexican song named after the legendary spirit of Hispanic-American folklore, was released August 8. Third single "The Fire This Time", named after James Baldwin's 1963 essay collection The Fire Next Time, was released September 8. Anderson first released "The Fire This Time" for two weeks on her Bandcamp page, donating over $2,500 of proceeds to the Minnesota Freedom Fund.

Anderson called the making of the album "probably a four-year process", saying that after her previous solo album Cloud Corner, she wasn't sure she had anything new to say. She "needed a little time and distance", leading to her intervening collaborative albums – The Quickening with Jim White and Lost Futures with William Tyler – to give her a change of pace. She said she thinks that move worked, that it "shook some other things loose and now I feel inspired again – and I'm writing new stuff all the time, which is fun." Per Anderson, "The Fire This Time" is about the murder of George Floyd and was written while protests were ongoing, with police sirens audible in the recording and the music representing her "visceral, horrified response to those events".

== Style ==
Per Dusted's Jennifer Kelly, the album is, "as always, lovely, serene and rooted in blues and folk traditions." Pitchfork's Andy Cush calls her fingerpicking technique reminiscent of both Piedmont blues and flamenco, and notes some tracks which take influence from early Philip Glass, Mississippi Fred McDowell, and sunshine pop. Cush says every song has its own identity.

== Reception ==
Still, Here ratings
Aggregate scores
Source	Rating
Metacritic	80/100
Review scores
Source	Rating
AllMusic	4/5 stars
Pitchfork	7/10
Record Collector	5/5 stars
Uncut	8/10

According to the review aggregator Metacritic, Still, Here received "generally favorable reviews" based on a weighted average score of 80 out of 100 from 4 critic scores.

== Track listing ==
All tracks are written by Marisa Anderson, except tracks 7 and 8 which are traditional and arranged by Anderson.

Still, Here track listing
No.	Title	Length
1.	"In Dark Water"	4:16
2.	"The Fire This Time"	3:38
3.	"The Low Country"	5:43
4.	"Night Air"	3:07
5.	"Waking"	3:07
6.	"The Crack Where the Light Gets In"	4:37
7.	"La Llorona"	3:31
8.	"Beat the Drum Slowly"	5:49
Total length:		33:48

== Personnel ==
- Marisa Anderson – composer, arranger, producer, recording engineer, nylon-string guitar, steel-string guitar, electric guitar, pedal steel guitar, requinto guitar, electric piano, synthesizer
- Jesse Munro Johnson – mixing engineer
- Amy Dragon – mastering engineer
- Dante Korinto – photography
- Daniel Castrejon – design
