= Marisa Anderson =

American guitarist (born 1970)

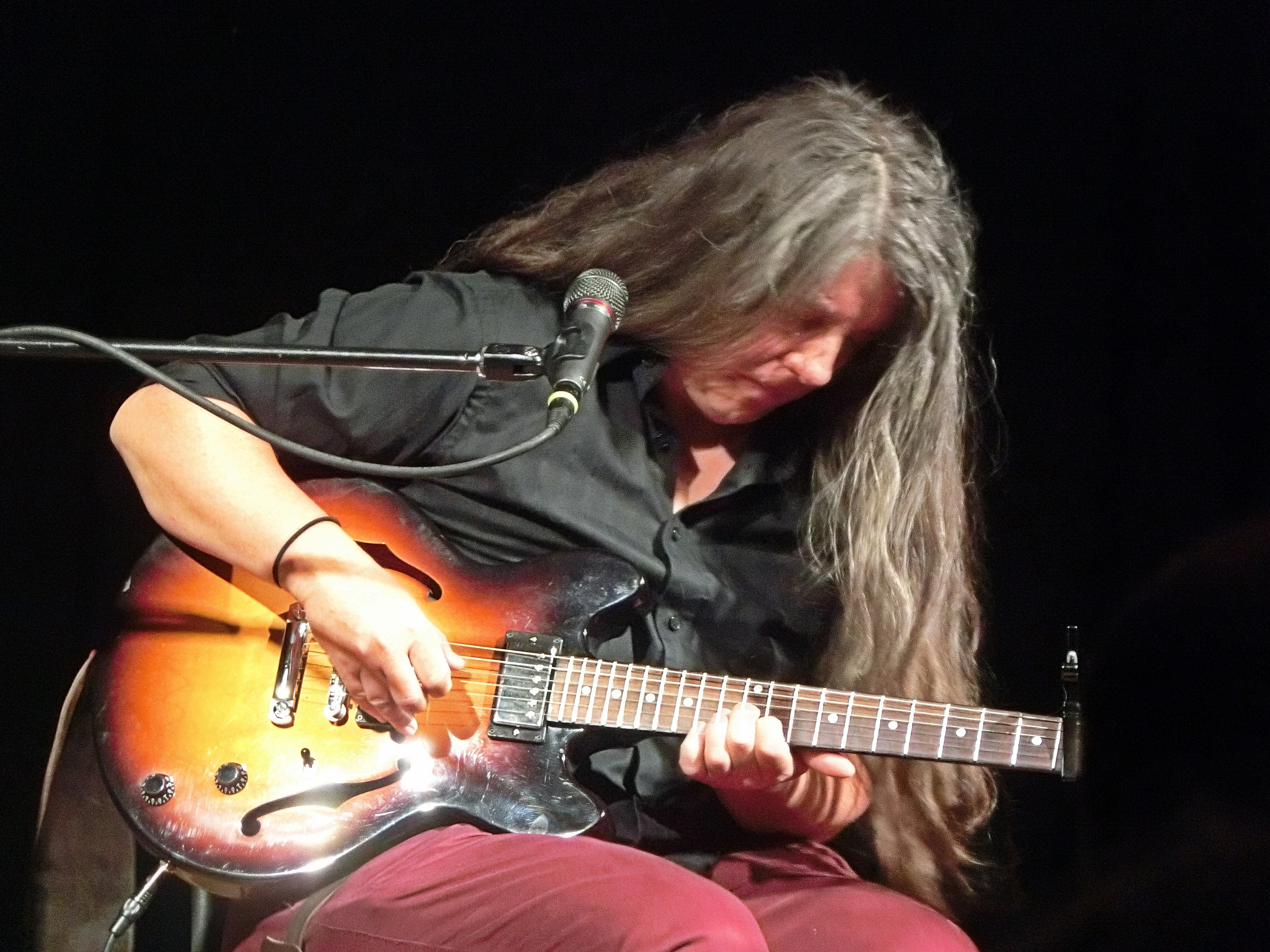
- Anderson in 2018

Background information
- Born: 1970 (age 55–56); Northern California, U.S.
- Origin: Portland, Oregon, U.S.
- Genres: American primitive guitar; neo-Americana
- Occupation: Musician
- Instrument: Guitar
- Labels: 16 Records; Mississippi; Grapefruit; Footfalls; Chaos Kitchen; Thrill Jockey
- Formerly of: The Dolly Ranchers; Evolutionary Jass Band
- Website: marisaandersonmusic.com

Marisa Anderson (born 1970) is an American guitarist and composer based in Portland, Oregon. She is primarily known for mixing American primitive guitar with various genres from throughout the United States and the rest of the world, and for her largely improvised compositions. Though primarily known for playing acoustic and electric guitars, she has also played keyboards and other instruments on her albums. Anderson grew up in Sonoma, California, and after dropping out of college, travelled around the United States and Mexico for several years before settling in Portland.

She has released 11 albums under her own name since 2006, including two collaborative albums with Jim White and one each with Tashi Dorji and William Tyler. She was also previously a member of the bands the Dolly Ranchers and Evolutionary Jass Band, releasing multiple albums with each act. She has toured with all three collaborators, as well as with acts such as Emmylou Harris, Godspeed You! Black Emperor, and Thurston Moore.

== Early life ==
Anderson was born in 1970 in Northern California and grew up in Sonoma. When she was young, she listened to church music and classical with her mother, and country – notably Doc Watson and the Oak Ridge Boys – with her father. She started playing guitar at age ten. In her teen and young adult years, she took lessons from fellow California guitarist Nina Gerber. A self-described "weird teenager", she learned about various styles of folk music from different parts of the world – including Mississippi Delta blues, British, African, and Appalachian music – by reading books from folklorist Cecil Sharp. She attended Humboldt State University before dropping out at age 19.

== Career ==
After dropping out of college, Anderson spent about ten years living without a fixed address. Most of this time was spent organizing and participating in political protests, including multiple cross-country walks which raised awareness for causes including environmental issues, Native American sovereignty, and the anti-nuclear movement. Some of this time was spent in Mexico, including a stint with a circus where she played for the anti-government guerrillas protesting during the Chiapas conflict in Southern Mexico. She was a member of the country-folk band the Dolly Ranchers from 1997 through 2003, playing on both of their albums and at their four-sets-a-night gig at a cowboy bar in New Mexico. She also worked at Rock Camp for Girls between 2003 and 2011, and contributed to its eponymous book. She settled in Portland, Oregon, after traveling to the Pacific Northwest for the 1999 Seattle WTO protests. In Portland, she joined the improvisational ensemble Evolutionary Jass Band for six years, recording three albums.

Her first solo album, Holiday Motel, was released by 16 Records in 2006, and earned her a nomination for the OUTMusic Award for Best Female Debut Record. That album was followed by 2009's The Golden Hour and 2013's Mercury, both released by Mississippi Records; and another 2013 album, Traditional and Public Domain Songs, which was released by Grapefruit Records. In 2014, she appeared as a guest musician on Sharon Van Etten's Are We There, playing guitar on its first track "Afraid of Nothing". In 2015, she released a split album, Tashi Dorji / Marisa Anderson, with Bhutan-born guitarist Tashi Dorji, which was released by Footfalls Records. The year after, she released Into the Light on her own label Chaos Kitchen Music. On October 31, 2017, she announced that she had signed to Thrill Jockey, with whom she released her next four albums: 2018's Cloud Corner; 2020's The Quickening, a collaboration with Australian drummer Jim White; 2021's Lost Futures, a collaboration with American folk guitarist William Tyler; and 2022's Still, Here.

Anderson had a cameo appearance alongside fellow Oregon musician Michael Hurley in the 2018 film Leave No Trace where they performed the songs "O My Stars" and "Dark Holler". She has also composed for films including 2022's Lake Forest Park and A Perfect Day for Caribou.

Anderson has toured and played live with numerous artists, including her album collaborators Tashi Dorji, William Tyler, and Jim White, as well as Yasmin Williams, Giorgos Xylouris, Ed Kuepper, Circuit des Yeux, Emmylou Harris, Godspeed You! Black Emperor, Charlie Parr, Bill Callahan, and Thurston Moore. She has performed at music festivals including Big Ears Festival, Pitchfork's Midwinter at the Art Institute of Chicago, Le Guess Who?, and Moogfest. She also performed on NPR Music's Tiny Desk Concerts series in 2014, mostly playing songs from Traditional and Public Domain Songs and Mercury.

On March 5, 2024, Anderson and White announced their second collaborative album, Swallowtail, and released its lead single "Bitterroot Valley Suite I: Water". The album was recorded in Point Lonsdale, Australia, and was released on May 10 by Thrill Jockey. The same year, Anderson appeared on Big Brave's album A Chaos of Flowers, providing guitar for the song "Canon: In Canon".

== Style ==
Anderson's music has been described as falling into the American primitive guitar style introduced by John Fahey in the 1960s, and she has been called a "neo-Americana guitar outsider". She mixes in influences from various other genres such as gospel, country, Appalachian folk and blues, jazz, circus music, minimalism, electronic, drone, and 20th century classical, while also including global influences such as Tuareg and Latin music on Cloud Corner and flamenco on Still, Here. On some albums, her music is also referred to as experimental.

She is known to improvise music rather than compose it on many of her recordings, including the entirety of her album The Quickening. On the subject, she has said she likes "to think about improvisation as a conversation" and that it's "really just an art at being literate and expressive no matter what language you are in... I am trying to be very present with the music and to make my intention realized with every performance." When asked in an interview how she got into improvisation, she said

I grew up playing classical. In classical music, there's a boss. What's on the page is the boss. What the composer intended, that's the boss. In classical music, you're not your own boss ever. That's fine, that's for a reason. Any song that's sung tends to lend itself to having a structure that you have to follow. Words are the boss, a lot of times. They're the boss of how a song goes, when it starts and when it ends, and what order the emotions lay out in.

I'm not against structure. I'm not even against doing things the same way. But in the creative process, I like to be free. Once it's the performance, there's room for all of it in my music. Some things I do exactly the same, and that's its own fun thing, is to adhere to that. Some things I do differently. In performance, what changes is the dynamic in the room.

=== Equipment ===
Anderson's main instrument is the guitar, both acoustic and electric, but she has also employed other instruments across her albums such as lap steel guitar, pedal steel guitar, and Wurlitzer electronic piano on Into the Light; and charango and requinto guitar on Cloud Corner. Her instrument collection also includes a Dobro from the 1930s, a terz guitar, a nylon-string parlor guitar, a custom Warmoth Telecaster with Lollar P-90 guitar pickups, and a Gibson ES-125 from the early 1940s.

== Discography ==
=== Solo ===
Albums

- Holiday Motel (2006, 16 Records)
- The Golden Hour (2009, Mississippi)
- Mercury (2013, Mississippi)
- Traditional and Public Domain Songs (2013, Grapefruit)
- Tashi Dorji / Marisa Anderson (2015, Footfalls, with Tashi Dorji)
- Into the Light (2016, Chaos Kitchen)
- Cloud Corner (2018, Thrill Jockey)
- The Quickening (2020, Thrill Jockey, with Jim White)
- Lost Futures (2021, Thrill Jockey, with William Tyler)
- Still, Here (2022, Thrill Jockey)
- Swallowtail (2024, Thrill Jockey, with Jim White)
- The Anthology of Unamerican Folk Music (2026, Thrill Jockey)

Singles

- "Into the Light" (2016, Into the Light)
- "He Is Without His Guns" (2016, Into the Light)
- "You'd Be So Nice to Come Home To" (2020, Jealous Butcher Records, with Tara Jane O'Neil)
- "The Lucky" (2020, The Quickening)
- "Gathering" and "Pallet" (2020, The Quickening)
- "Lost Futures" (2021, Lost Futures)
- "Hurricane Light" (2021, Lost Futures)
- "At the Edge of the World" (2021, Lost Futures)
- "Waking" (2022, Still, Here)
- "La Llorona" (2022, Still, Here)
- "The Fire This Time" (2022, Still, Here)
- "For All We Know" (2023, with Tara Jane O'Neil)
- "Bitterroot Valley Suite I: Water" (2024, Swallowtail)
- "Peregrine" (2024, Swallowtail)

=== With the Dolly Ranchers ===
- Ten O'Clock Bird (2000, Chaos Kitchen)
- Escape Artist (2002, Chaos Kitchen)
