= Swallowtail (album) =

Studio album by Jim White and Marisa Anderson
- Released: May 10, 2024
- Recorded: June 2022
- Studio: Resting Bell (Point Lonsdale, Australia)
- Genre: Abstract; folk
- Length: 37:04
- Label: Thrill Jockey

Jim White chronology
All Hits: Memories (2024)	Swallowtail (2024)	After the Flood (with Ed Kuepper) (2025)

Marisa Anderson chronology
Still, Here (2022)	Swallowtail (2024)	The Anthology of Unamerican Folk Music (2026)

Singles from Swallowtail
- 1. "Bitterroot Valley Suite I: Water" Released: March 5, 2024; 2. "Peregrine" Released: April 23, 2024

Swallowtail is a collaborative studio album by Australian drummer Jim White and American guitarist Marisa Anderson, released on May 10, 2024, by Thrill Jockey. It is Anderson and White's second collaborative album together, after The Quickening in 2020. The album was recorded in Australia with engineer Nick Huggins. It was preceded by two single.

== Recording and release ==
Anderson and White recorded with Nick Huggins in June 2022 at Resting Bell Studio in Point Lonsdale, a coastal town in Victoria, Australia. On recording in Point Lonsdale, Anderson said "It was a big change of vibe and scenery, to be out of the city and on the coast with no distraction and to be working with an engineer (and avid surfer) who is attuned to the cycles of tides and sunrises and sunsets and ocean rhythms. I think all of that got into the music as we were making it."

The album was announced on March 5, 2024, with a release date set for May 10 by Thrill Jockey. With the announcement, they released the lead single, "Bitterroot Valley Suite I: Water", the first movement of a three-part suite. KLOF Magazine's Alex Gallacher called the song "an alluring and organic-sounding piece." The duo also announced tour dates for the United States, some co-headlining with Canadian folk musician Myriam Gendron.

The second single, "Peregrine", was released on April 23, 2024. On the song, Anderson said "The word peregrine has two meanings, one being a type of falcon, and the other meaning referring to having a tendency to wander. This song starts off kind of lazily, begins to circle and builds up height and speed, as if riding a thermal skyward, hits a solid stride and dissipates upwards, dancing in the heights before disappearing into the distance." Stereogum's described it as feeling "like structure manifesting from a void, formless space", and KLOF Magazine's Alex Gallacher called it "a gorgeous ten-and-a-half-minute slow-burner that could suggestively fire the imagination with visions of flight or a long perambulation. The build-up of to the crescendo is exquisite, highlighting not just the duo's almost effortless synchronicity but their intuitive use of space and tension."

== Reception ==
KLOF Magazine's Glenn Kimpton wrote that White and Anderson "have crafted such a distinctive sound on their respective instruments and as soon as their second album begins, there can be no mistaking them." He called "Peregrine" the "key track", with its ten minute runtime giving it "plenty of time to establish itself [which it does] with sparse playing, Anderson picking lines at leisure, creating cyclical clusters of mesmerising notes that White's drums dance around in places, step away from in others and then return to with more fire." AllMusic's Thom Jurek wrote that "Swallowtail proves The Quickening was no fluke. It goes wider and deeper thanks to years of friendship, mutual respect, and a shared spirit of spontaneous adventure." Philip Sherburne said he "love[s] the way you can hear ideas taking shape in real time; it flows with a naturalism that's hard to wrap my head around", and that he "could listen to this all day."

NPR Music's Lars Gotrich wrote that on the album, the duo "deepen [their] telepathic collaboration", with "their circular improvisations like a spinning top that wobbles but never topples." The Chicago Reader's Noah Berlatsky called the album "a mix of abstract exploration and gentle folk melody that thoughtfully wanders through a landscape that's part experimental, part new age, part easy listening, and part psychedelic. Treble's Jeff Terich called the album "consistently breathtaking" and "a gorgeous showcase for what two phenomenal and imaginative players can do together, crafting improvised pieces that range from the stormy to sedate."

== Track listing ==
All tracks are written by Jim White and Marisa Anderson.

Swallowtail track listing
No.	Title	Length
1.	"Aerie"	3:49
2.	"Bitterroot Valley Suite I: Water"	4:58
3.	"Bitterroot Valley Suite II: Tree"	5:35
4.	"Bitterroot Valley Suite III: Wind"	4:13
5.	"Peregrine"	10:31
6.	"Aurora"	7:58
Total length:		37:04

== Personnel ==
- Jim White – drums
- Marisa Anderson – guitar
- Nick Huggins – recording engineer
- Tucker Martine – mixing engineer (Flora Recording & Playback)
- Amy Dragon – mastering engineer (Telegraph Audio)
- Anna White – artwork
- Daniel Castrejón – layout
