= Lost Futures =

Studio album by Marisa Anderson and William Tyler
- Released: August 27, 2021
- Recorded: September 2020
- Studio: Flora Recording & Playback, Portland, Oregon
- Genre: Ambient, blues, Americana
- Length: 41:09
- Label: Thrill Jockey
- Producer: Anderson; Tucker Martine; Tyler

William Tyler chronology
Goes West (2019)	Lost Futures (2021)	Frozen Shelter (2021)

Marisa Anderson chronology
The Quickening (2020)	Lost Futures (2021)	Still, Here (2022)

Singles from Lost Futures
- 1. "Lost Futures" Released: March 18, 2021; 2. "Hurricane Light" Released: June 4, 2021; 3. "At the Edge of the World" Released: August 24, 2021

Lost Futures is a studio album by American guitarists Marisa Anderson and William Tyler, released August 27, 2021, via Thrill Jockey. Lost Futures was recorded by producer Tucker Martine at his Portland, Oregon recording studio Flora Recording & Playback over a five day session in early September 2020.

== Background ==
The pair first decided to make an album together after performing at a David Berman tribute concert in Portland in January 2020. In describing their meeting, Anderson said, "There was an obvious and immediate affinity musically and personally, which led to the feeling that we should try and do something together."

The album is inspired by, and named in reference to, Jacques Derrida's philosophical concept hauntology, and particularly Mark Fisher's writing on the subject in his work Ghosts of My Life: Writings on Depression, Hauntology and Lost Futures. Tyler had been gifted a copy of Fisher's book by his manager Ben Swank. In an interview, Tyler admitted he hadn't read the book at the time they made the album, and Anderson wasn't familiar with Fisher, but they agreed that they both liked the phrase for their album title and were inspired by their interpretation of it. Tyler said that, having read the book subsequently, he found Fisher to be "not a very hopeful person in his writing", and that the pair "wanted to re-contextualize something about the concept of lost futures. There's an opening there rather than a closed door."

The album was preceded by three singles: the title track released March 18, 2021, "Hurricane Light" released June 4, and "At the Edge of the World" released August 24.

== Packaging ==
The album's front cover was made by the artist Sam Smith. The back cover features a photograph by Anderson of an abandoned theme park in Louisiana.

== Reception ==
Lost Futures ratings
Aggregate scores
Source	Rating
Metacritic	82/100
Review scores
Source	Rating
AllMusic	4/5 stars
Loud and Quiet	6/10
Mojo	4/5 stars
Pitchfork	7/10
PopMatters	8/10
Spectrum Culture	85/100
Uncut	8/10

According to the review aggregator Metacritic, Lost Futures received "universal acclaim" based on a weighted average score of 82 out of 100 from 7 critic scores. AllMusic's Timothy Monger wrote that "it might take a number of listens to fully appreciate Lost Futures' peculiar spread of dynamics. But, like any grower, its slow revelation is part of its charm." PopMatters's Chris Ingalls wrote that the "brilliant artists" Tyler, Anderson, and Martine "are bursting with creativity and bold ideas", and that the album "may be dotted with nostalgia, but it's most definitely a bold move forward." Holly Hazelwood wrote for Spectrum Culture that Lost Futures is "one of the best albums of 2021 not because it's daring or because of what it has to say, but because its craftsmanship is such that you'll be mad that this is (as of now) all that we have to listen to from the duo."

Loud and Quiet's Alex Francis wrote that the "album's artwork makes it clear that the album is also about climate change in the broadest possible sense", but that "This doesn't make it through to the music itself, which is largely too pleasant and meandering to really make clear the threat, sorrow and chaos of rapid climate change. The album's understanding of climate change is less nuanced than Daniel Bachman's excellent Axacan, which made clear the connections between extractive colonial capitalism and global heating without losing the music's emotional core". Francis also said that "The bottom line is that this album does not reshape Americana in a new image, like the work of Bachman, Yasmin Williams, or Gwenifer Raymond. But, realistically, that's because William Tyler and Marisa Anderson already did that years ago and their influence is only beginning to be fully felt. It's enough for Lost Futures to offer some more to completionists while giving a good introduction to those who are newly exploring the genre".

== Track listing ==
All tracks are written by Marisa Anderson and William Tyler. All tracks are produced by Anderson, Tyler, and Tucker Martine.

Lost Futures track listing
No.	Title	Length
1.	"News About Heaven"	3:56
2.	"Lost Futures"	2:54
3.	"Pray for Rain"	5:14
4.	"Something Will Come"	6:02
5.	"At the Edge of the World"	6:16
6.	"Hurricane Light"	3:56
7.	"Life and Casualty"	4:05
8.	"Haunted by Water"	8:43
Total length:		41:09

== Personnel ==
- Marisa Anderson – guitars, songwriting, producing, photography
- William Tyler – guitars, songwriting, producing
- Tucker Martine – producing, recording, mixing, drums, bass
- Cole Halverson – recording and mixing assistant
- Gisela Rodriguez Fernandez – violin, viola
- Patricia Vásquez Gómez – quijada
- Amy Dragon – mastering
- Sam Smith – cover art
- Daniel Castrejón – design
