= Into the Light (Marisa Anderson album) =

2016 studio album

Studio album by Marisa Anderson
- Released: June 24, 2016
- Genre: American folk, Americana
- Length: 37:09
- Label: Chaos Kitchen

Marisa Anderson chronology
Tashi Dorji / Marisa Anderson (2015)	Into the Light (2016)	Cloud Corner (2018)

Singles from Into the Light
- 1. "Into the Light" Released: March 10, 2016; 2. "He Is Without His Guns" Released: April 13, 2016

Into the Light is the fifth solo studio album by Portland, Oregon-based guitarist Marisa Anderson, released June 24, 2016, by the artist's label Chaos Kitchen Music. (Note: Stereogum said the album would be released by Mississippi Records, while other sources claim the album was self-released, either in those exact words; crediting it to Anderson directly; crediting it to Chaos Kitchen Music, which is Anderson's own record label; or crediting it to both.)

== Background ==
In the album's notes, Anderson describes the album as being "Written as the soundtrack to an imaginary science-fiction Western film" with "ten songs [that] trace the story of a visitor lost and wandering on the shifting borderlands of the Sonoran desert." The album was preceded by two singles: the title track released March 10, 2016, and "He Is Without His Guns" released April 13.

== Style and reception ==
Into the Light ratings
Aggregate scores
Source	Rating
Metacritic	81/100
Review scores
Source	Rating
Pitchfork	7.9/10
Tiny Mix Tapes	3.5/5 stars

According to the review aggregator Metacritic, Into the Light received "universal acclaim" based on a weighted average score of 81 out of 100 from 6 critic scores.

Pitchfork's Allison Hussey wrote that on Into the Light, Anderson "bends American guitar traditions for a completely different, but no less captivating, conceit: They soundtrack a theoretical sci-fi Western of Anderson's own invention, where it's up to the listener to fill in the cinematic details" and that "her faint picking encourages you to lean in and listen closer to soak in the details" such as "experiments with a more classical Spanish-style guitar" on "He Is Without His Guns". "Anderson's playing throughout the record is understated and exquisite" and "the only moments that feel dissonant arrive in "Resurrection" as a few unwieldy notes poke through, sounding like faraway car horns", though "these off-kilter moments act as foils to Anderson's fluid playing, again highlighting the baritone notes that anchor the song." Hussey concludes by calling the album "breathtakingly beautiful", "requir[ing] rapt attention", and "best enjoyed in still solitude", and that "even as Anderson's instrument simmers, it still reaches for the great beyond, and she makes you ache to reach along with it."

Dusted's Ben Donnelly calls the album a break from Anderson's previous work, being "not solo" because "she multi-tracks her guitar, usually two layers, maybe more in a few places" which is "enough of a change that it significantly departs from her prior American primitive explorations". Another difference is that Into the Light "linger[s] in a sun-bleached desert atmosphere, rather than the mud and green of eastern folk forms. Anderson grew up in the southwest, so the landscape is part of her personal history. Her past work, though generous with reverb, didn't evoke wide open spaces like this." NPR's Lars Gotrich writes that Anderson's science-fiction Western setting "might immediately evoke the Yul Brynner-starring thriller Westworld" but instead "carries the quietness and starkness of Solaris set in the Sonoran desert." Gotrich notes that Anderson "recorded and played all of the instruments — guitar, lap steel, pedal steel, electric piano and percussion — giving her songs not only layers, but also characters." In the back half, "Anderson does what she does best: discover the unknown. But with more instruments at hand, these improvisations turn into internal dialogues."

The Portland Mercury's Ciara Dolan writes that the album "sounds like one long ride into the sunset—a journey that gradually but magnetically moves toward the horizon", that "its 10 songs are vignettes that bleed into each other like watercolor landscapes, swelling and sighing with the energy of living, breathing beings", and that the setting "is vividly illustrated with warm layers of lap and pedal steel that whinny with nostalgic resonance and twang". The album "never feels overly dramatic" with Anderson "deftly experiment[ing] with her guitar and its ability to expand in space and time" and "perfectly us[ing] the feeling of the rising and fading sun as a measurement of time passing, with each song cast in a different morphing shadow of the album's ever-changing light." The Absolute Sound's Hannah Blanchette said the album showcase Anderson's "versatile skills on acoustic guitar, lap steel, pedal steel, electric piano, and percussion, with the guitar taking center stage much of time", and said its songs "are expansive, reverberating mosaics of folk, blues, country, and American primitive traditions."

== Track listing ==
All tracks are written by Marisa Anderson.

Into the Light track listing
No.	Title	Length
1.	"Into the Light"	3:40
2.	"In Waves"	3:20
3.	"Waltz of Shadows"	4:31
4.	"The Old Guard"	3:10
5.	"He Is Without His Guns"	3:24
6.	"Chimes"	4:01
7.	"Resurrection"	4:28
8.	"House of the Setting Sun"	3:14
9.	"The Golden West"	4:23
10.	"End of the Night"	2:58
Total length:		37:09

== Personnel ==
- Marisa Anderson – guitar, lap steel guitar, pedal steel guitar, Wurlitzer electronic piano, percussion, recording
- Jesse Munro Johnson – mixing
- Timothy Stollenwerk – mastering
- Jodi Darby – cover design
