= Blood Lightning 2007 =

Studio album by Burning Star Core
- Released: March 17, 2007
- Recorded: Fall 2004 – Winter 2006
- Studio: Ashworth Tap Room, Cincinnati, OH
- Genre: Drone, noise
- Length: 51:35
- Label: No Fun

Burning Star Core chronology
Everyday World of Bodies (2006)	Blood Lightning 2007 (2007)	Operator Dead... Post Abandoned (2007)

Professional ratings
Review scores
Source	Rating
Allmusic	3.5/5 stars

Blood Lightning 2007 is the fifth studio album by Burning Star Core, released on March 17, 2007 by No Fun Productions.

== Track listing ==
All music is composed by C. Spencer Yeh.

No.	Title	Length
1.	"The Universe Is Designed to Break Your Heart"	11:13
2.	"A Curse on the Coast"	5:44
3.	"Deaf-Mute Spinning Resonator"	6:56
4.	"The Universe Is Designed to Break Your Mind"	13:37
5.	"10-09-04 Horrible Room, Lexington KY"	14:05

== Personnel ==
Adapted from the Blood Lightning 2007 liner notes.

- Robery Beatty – electronics (5)
- Mike Shiflet – electronics (5), computer (5)
- C. Spencer Yeh – violin, recording, mixing, editing
- Trevor Tremaine – drums (5), percussion (5)

Production and additional personnel

- James Plotkin – mastering
- The Wyvern – cover art

== Release history ==
Region	Date	Label	Format	Catalog
United States	2007	No Fun	CD	NFP-12
