= Operator Dead... Post Abandoned =

Studio album by Burning Star Core
- Released: April 24, 2007
- Recorded: Summer 2005
- Studio: Horrible Room, Lexington, KY
- Genre: Drone, noise
- Length: 52:29
- Label: No Quarter

Burning Star Core chronology
Blood Lightning 2007 (2007)	Operator Dead... Post Abandoned (2007)	Challenger (2008)

Professional ratings
Review scores
Source	Rating
Pitchfork Media	(7.4/10)

Operator Dead... Post Abandoned is the sixth studio album by Burning Star Core, released on April 17, 2007 by No Quarter Records.

== Track listing ==
All music is composed by C. Spencer Yeh.

No.	Title	Length
1.	"When the Tripods Came"	19:22
2.	"Operator Dead... Post Abandoned"	16:47
3.	"Me & My Arrow"	7:30
4.	"The Emergency Networks Are Taking Over"	8:50

== Personnel ==
Adapted from the Operator Dead... Post Abandoned liner notes.

Musicians

- Robery Beatty – electronics
- Mike Shiflet – electronics, computer, voice
- C. Spencer Yeh – violin, electronics, trumpet, voice
- Trevor Tremaine – drums, percussion

Production and additional personnel

- Alan Douches – mastering
- Paul Romano – cover art, art direction

== Release history ==
Region	Date	Label	Format	Catalog
United States	2007	No Quarter	CD	NOQ014
