= The Very Heart of the World =

Studio album by Burning Star Core
- Released: April 2005
- Recorded: 2002 – 2004
- Genre: Drone, noise
- Length: 31:55
- Label: Thin Wrist

Burning Star Core chronology
| Amelia (2003) | The Very Heart of the World (2005) | Mes Soldats Stupides '96 - '04 (2005) |

Professional ratings
Review scores
| Source | Rating |
|---|---|
| Exclaim! | Favorable |
| Pitchfork Media | (7.0/10) |

The Very Heart of the World is the second studio album by Burning Star Core, released in April 2005 by Thin Wrist Recordings.

== Track listing ==
All music is composed by C. Spencer Yeh.

| No. | Title | Length |
|---|---|---|
| 1. | "Benjamin" | 7:13 |
| 2. | "Nyarlathotep" | 4:48 |
| 3. | "Catapults" | 5:37 |
| 4. | "Come Back Through Me" | 14:17 |

== Personnel ==
Adapted from The Very Heart of the World liner notes.

- Robery Beatty – organ (3), percussion (3), electronics (4)
- Mike Connelly – instruments (4)
- Jeremy Lesniak – percussion (2)
- Sara O'Keefe – clarinet (3)
- Mike Shiflet – instruments (4)
- Trevor Tremaine – guitar (3), drums (4)
- C. Spencer Yeh – violin

== Release history ==
| Region | Date | Label | Format | Catalog |
|---|---|---|---|---|
| United States | 2005 | Thin Wrist | CD, LP | TW-G |
