= The Wants (album) =

Studio album by The Phantom Band
- Released: 18 October 2010
- Genre: Indie rock
- Length: 48:01
- Label: Chemikal Underground

The Phantom Band chronology
Checkmate Savage (2009)	The Wants (2010)	Strange Friend (2014)

Professional ratings
Review scores
Source	Rating
BBC	(very favourable)
Drowned in Sound	9/10
Entertainment.ie	4/5 stars
The Fly	4/5 stars
The Guardian	4/5 stars
musicOMH	4/5 stars
NME	7/10
The Observer	(very favourable)
The Scotsman	4/5 stars
The Skinny	4/5 stars

The Wants is the second studio album by Scottish indie rock band The Phantom Band, released on 18 October 2010 through Chemikal Underground Records.

== Track listing ==
1. "A Glamour" - 6:25
2. "O" - 4:31
3. "Everybody Knows It's True - 4:17
4. "The None Of One" - 8:19
5. "Mr. Natural" - 5:22
6. "Come Away In The Dark" - 2:41
7. "Walls" - 4:37
8. "Into The Corn" - 6:27
9. "Goodnight Arrow" - 5:22

== Personnel ==
- Duncan Marquiss
- Gerry Hart
- Andy Wake
- Rick Anthony
- Damien Tonner
- Greg Sinclair
