= No Selfish Heart =

Studio album by Rick Redbeard
- Released: 28 January 2013
- Recorded: Aberdeenshire, Glasgow, Bernese Oberland
- Genre: Alternative folk, alternative country
- Length: 43.07
- Label: Chemikal Underground
- Producer: Rick Anthony

Professional ratings
Aggregate scores
Source	Rating
Metacritic	88/100
Review scores
Source	Rating
The Arts Desk	4/5 stars
Drowned in Sound	8/10
The List	4/5 stars
Mojo	4/5 stars
musicOMH	4/5 stars
Scotland on Sunday	4/5 stars
The Scotsman	4/5 stars
The Skinny	4/5 stars
Uncut	9/10

No Selfish Heart is the first album by Rick Redbeard, the solo recording pseudonym of Scottish musician Rick Anthony. It was released on 28 January 2013 through Chemikal Underground Records to critical acclaim.

It was self-recorded by Anthony in Aberdeenshire, Glasgow and the Bernese Oberland in the first half of 2012. It is composed of songs written by Anthony between 2004 and 2012 as well as a version of the traditional Scottish folk song Kelvin Grove and one older home-recording from 2007, the single Now We're Dancing.

== Themes ==
The album deals primarily with themes of nature, love, sex, death, memory, nostalgia and the passage of time and has a stripped back sound and emphasis on acoustic instrumentation that is markedly different from Anthony's prior work with The Phantom Band.

== Influences ==
Critics noted the influence on the album of iconic artists such as Leonard Cohen, Will Oldham, Bill Callahan, Jason Molina, Jim Reid (folk musician), Alasdair Roberts and Neil Young as well as the dark, sparse Southern gothic prose of Cormac McCarthy and the surreal fantasy of Alasdair Gray. Anthony has also spoken of the influence that landscape and nature has on his writing, specifically the scenery of his native Aberdeenshire and the mountains of the Bernese Alps.

== Track listing ==
1. "Clocks" - 2.19
2. "Old Blue" - 4.06
3. "Any Way I Can" - 5.21
4. "A Greater Brave" - 5.08
5. "We All Float" - 3.03
6. "Kelvin Grove" - 5.52
7. "Now We're Dancing" - 4.02
8. "Cold As Clay (The Grave)" - 4.07
9. "Wildlove" - 3.11
10. "No Selfish Heart" - 5.59

== Personnel ==
- Rick Anthony - vocals, guitar, piano, percussion, melodica, xylophone, bass
- Josephine Anthony - backing vocals and photography
- Angus Ramsay - violin
- Eileen Ramsay - layout, design and photography
- Oran Wishart - layout and design
- Kenny MacLeod - mastering
