= Time Indefinite (album) =

Studio album by William Tyler
- Released: April 25, 2025
- Studio: Huge Planet, Nashville, Tennessee; Los Angeles
- Length: 48:46
- Label: Psychic Hotline
- Producer: Jake Davis; Alex Somers

William Tyler chronology
Future Myths (2024)	Time Indefinite (2025)

Time Indefinite is the seventh studio album by American musician and guitarist William Tyler. It was released on April 25, 2025, by Psychic Hotline.

== Background ==
Time Definite is the first solo album by Tyler since his 2019 project, Goes West. It was recorded in Huge Planet Studio in Nashville and Los Angeles, and produced and engineered by Jake Davis and Alex Somers. The title is derived from the autobiographical 1993 documentary film, Time Indefinite, directed by Ross McElwee.

== Reception ==
Professional ratings
Aggregate scores
Source	Rating
Metacritic	87/100
Review scores
Source	Rating
AllMusic	4.5/5 stars
Financial Times	4/5 stars
The Line of Best Fit	9/10
Mojo	4/5 stars
Paste	8.5/10
Pitchfork	8.0/10
PopMatters	8/10
Record Collector	4/5 stars
Under the Radar	8/10
Uncut	9/10

AllMusic rated the album 4.5 out of five and called it "another career highlight that pushes Tyler boldly into the future". The Line of Best Fit assigned it a rating of nine out of ten, stating "With Time Indefinite, William Tyler offers a fresh and uniquely compelling way to affirm that it's OK not to be OK: these are humbly majestic anthems for our anxious age." The Guardian noted about the album, "the few clear guitar refrains on Time Indefinite chime with nursery-rhyme simplicity," while the Financial Times described it as "embedded in computerised textures and results from a mid-life sense of crisis."

== Track listing ==
Time Indefinite track listing
No.	Title	Length
1.	"Cabin Six"	8:14
2.	"Concern"	5:29
3.	"Star of Hope"	5:32
4.	"Howling at the Second Moon"	3:52
5.	"A Dream, a Flood"	3:03
6.	"Anima Motel"	5:02
7.	"Electric Lake"	3:46
8.	"Hardest Land to Harvest"	7:51
9.	"Held"	5:57
Total length:		48:46

== Personnel ==
Credits adapted from the album's liner notes.

- William Tyler – production, guitars, synthesizers, harmonium, tapes, thumb piano
- Jake Davis – production, engineering, recording, electronics, tape loops, radios, synthesizers, drums
- Alex Somers – production, engineering, mixing, recording, keyboards, vocals
- Taylor Deupree – mastering
- Sam's Myth – art direction, design
- Elise Tyler – photography
- Jake Falby – strings and string arrangements
- Luke Schneider – pedal steel guitar

== Charts ==
Chart performance for Time Indefinite
Chart (2025)	Peak position
UK Album Downloads (OCC)	64
