= Papercuts Theater =

Live album by Burning Star Core
- Released: March 9, 2010
- Recorded: 1997–2008
- Genre: Drone
- Length: 66:05
- Label: No Quarter

Burning Star Core chronology
Challenger (2008)	Papercuts Theater (2010)

Professional ratings
Review scores
Source	Rating
PopMatters	(7/10)

Papercuts Theater is a live album by Burning Star Core, released on March 9, 2010 by No Quarter Records.

== Track listing ==
All music is composed by C. Spencer Yeh.

No.	Title	Length
1.	"Part I"	16:39
2.	"Part II"	16:31
3.	"Part III"	16:30
4.	"Part IV"	16:25

== Personnel ==
Adapted from the Papercuts Theater liner notes.

Burning Star Core

- Robery Beatty – electronics
- Jeremy Lesniak – electronics, percussion
- John Rich – guitar
- Mike Shiflet – electronics, computer
- C. Spencer Yeh – violin, electronics, voice, editing
- Trevor Tremaine – drums, percussion

Additional musicians

- Russell Beebe – horn (3)
- Mike Connelly – voice (3)
- Lambsbread – guitar (3), drums (3)
- Dave Rempis – alto saxophone (3)
- Jim Reynolds – electronics (2–4), percussion (2–4)
- Craig Shepard – trombone (3)

Production and additional personnel

- Paul Romano – cover art, art direction, design
- Carl Saff – mastering

== Release history ==
Region	Date	Label	Format	Catalog
United States	2010	No Quarter	CD, LP	NOQ022
