= Checkmate Savage =

Studio album by The Phantom Band
- Released: 26 January 2009
- Recorded: Chem 19, Blantyre
- Genre: Indie, folk, pop, blues, post-rock folktronica, krautrock
- Length: 55:01
- Label: Chemikal Underground
- Producer: Paul Savage

The Phantom Band chronology
Checkmate Savage (2009)	The Wants (2010)

Professional ratings
Review scores
Source	Rating
Allmusic	4/5 stars
Drowned in Sound	(7/10)
The Guardian	4/5 stars
The List	5/5 stars
Mojo	4/5 stars
NME	(8/10)
Pitchfork	(7.3/10)
Q	3/5 stars
Scotland on Sunday	4/5 stars
The Times	4/5 stars

Checkmate Savage is the debut studio album by Scottish indie rock band The Phantom Band, released on 26 January 2009 through Chemikal Underground Records to critical acclaim.

The album was produced by Paul Savage, formerly of The Delgados.

On 25 January 2019 Chemikal Underground released a deluxe double vinyl gatefold edition of the album to celebrate its 10th anniversary.

== Title ==
According to the band, the album's title refers to: "over-population, dwindling natural resources and the yawning void within every one of us caused by society's unnatural social contracts, and mass sexual repression, means one thing: it's checkmate for the human animal."

== Accolades ==
In December 2009, Checkmate Savage entered The Skinny's "Scottish Albums of the Decade" list at #28.

Publication	Country	Accolade	Year	Rank
The Skinny	Scotland	Scottish Albums of the Decade	2009	28

The album placed at number 17 in MOJO magazine's top 50 albums of 2009.

In January 2010 the album was given the inaugural Soundcheck Award for album of 2009 by Radioeins and Der Tagesspiegel in Berlin.

== Track listing ==
1. "The Howling" - 6:35
2. "Burial Sounds" - 4:47
3. "Folk Song Oblivion - 4:14
4. "Crocodile" - 7:42
5. "Halfhound" - 4:11
6. "Left Hand Wave" - 5:40
7. "Island" - 8:51
8. "Throwing Bones" - 5:01
9. "The Whole is on My Side" - 7:53

== Personnel ==
- Duncan Marquiss – guitar, vocals, percussion, fx, artwork
- Gerry Hart – bass, vocals, percussion, fx, artwork
- Andy Wake – synthesizers, vocals, samples, percussion, fx, artwork
- Rick Anthony – guitar, vocals, percussion, fx, artwork
- Damien Tonner – drums, percussion, fx, artwork
- James SK Wān – bamboo flute
- Greg Sinclair – guitar, pedals/fx, percussion, artwork
- Paul Savage – producer
- Jamie Savage – engineer
- Kenny MacLeod – mastering
- Christopher O'Donnell – flexatone ("Throwing Bones")
- Aztext – design
