= Amelia (EP) =

EP by Burning Star Core
- Released: 2003
- Genre: Ambient, drone
- Length: 22:07
- Label: Thin Wrist

Burning Star Core chronology
A Brighter Summer Day (2002)	Amelia (2003)	The Very Heart of the World (2005)

Amelia is an EP by Burning Star Core, released in 2003 by Thin Wrist Recordings.

== Track listing ==
All music is composed by C. Spencer Yeh.

No.	Title	Length
1.	"I Wanna Make a Supersonic Woman of You"	6:06
2.	"Homing Pigeon"	4:46
3.	"The Point of Departure Is Not to Return"	11:15

== Personnel ==
Adapted from the Amelia liner notes.

- C. Spencer Yeh – instruments

== Release history ==
Region	Date	Label	Format	Catalog
United States	2003	DroneDisco	LP	fig.64
United Kingdom	2007	No-Fi	CD	NEU002
