= Cloud Corner =

Studio album by Marisa Anderson
- Released: June 15, 2018
- Recorded: January 2017
- Studio: Anderson's home studio, Portland, Oregon
- Genre: Ambient; Tuareg music; American folk; Latin
- Length: 36:19
- Label: Thrill Jockey

Marisa Anderson chronology
Into the Light (2016)	Cloud Corner (2018)	The Quickening (2020)

Cloud Corner is the sixth solo studio album by Portland-based guitarist Marisa Anderson, released June 15, 2018, by Thrill Jockey. It is her first release with the label.

== Background and recording ==
In an interview with Bomb, Anderson told that she recorded the album in her home in January 2017, noting that she has a studio in her garage but had to relocate to inside the house as it was "an unusually cold month that year." Trouble with her house's electricity led her to record with an Ampeg v-22 guitar amplifier, "a huge, loud beast compared to the small Fender amps I usually use." Those initial recordings were intended as rough drafts but the tones that came from recording in different rooms of the house convinced her to keep them.

The cover photo, depicting a line of trees obscured by fog and taken by Greenpeace photographer Caroline Dossche, was chosen by Anderson because she liked it "for a lot of reasons. I like both the form and the formlessness. You know you're looking at trees even though you can't quite see them. I like the sense of distance and movement and horizon it conveys, even though you don't actually see the horizon. I like that it's sequential and patterned. It speaks a lot to compositional elements in the music, as well as an overarching feeling that I had with this record of embodying clarity and obscurity simultaneously." "Lament" was made as a reaction a photograph of Alan Kurdi, a two-year-old Syrian refugee who drowned in the Mediterranean Sea while leaving Bodrum, Turkey with his family, lying dead on the beach. The album's inclusion of West African musical influence was inspired by Malian musician Ali Farka Touré, who Anderson first heard when she was "probably 18", finding his music "very immediate" and "something I'd never heard before" which "enraptured" her.

== Style and reception ==
Cloud Corner ratings
Aggregate scores
Source	Rating
Metacritic	83/100
Review scores
Source	Rating
AllMusic	4/5 stars
Americana UK	4/10
Pitchfork	7.8/10

According to the review aggregator Metacritic, Cloud Corner received "universal acclaim" based on a weighted average score of 83 out of 100 from 5 critic scores. AllMusic's Timothy Monger wrote that Cloud Corner "feels like an old photograph come to life or a languorous, unhurried midday meal" and "while it shares some of same dusty characteristics of its predecessor, this unthemed ten-song set moves with its own insouciant gait." Monger notes "tones of American folk and blues mingle with West African Tuareg and Latin in the global village of Anderson's fingertips". NPR's Allison Hussey wrote that on Cloud Corner "Anderson demonstrates yet again that she's one of this era's most powerful [guitar] players, one whose sleight of hand is some serious business, indeed."

Pitchfork's Grayson Haver Currin opened with a story of a 2015 interaction after a concert in Sant Feliu de Guíxols, Spain, with a fan who asked Anderson "Why don't you play any happy songs?" While her answer at the time was to tell him "happiness wasn't her job", Currin told that she "absolutely" could "write a solo guitar instrumental so buoyant, no one would mistake it for sad" as she "practically jaunts through a stunning four-minute track named for the city where she accepted the challenge". And while this isn't the first upbeat song she's written, Currin considers Anderson "one of the best emotional mediums in the field of solo guitar" and "a master of lovely melancholy". Currin calls the title track "one of the most beautiful and transfixing solo guitar recordings in years" which "simultaneously recalls the 'continuous music' of pianist Lubomyr Melnyk (and his descendant, the guitarist James Blackshaw) and the incisive Delta blues of Lightnin' Hopkins." Dusted's Isaac Olson called Anderson's music "as unpretentious and selfless as the American and African folk traditions that inspire her", noting that Cloud Corner continues Into the Light's overdubbing experiments, this time adding "Wurlitzer piano, the Andean charango, and the Mexican requinto jarocho" to her repertoire. Olson calls Anderson's "fluttering technique and narrative voice ... so distinctive" that the album's "denser instrumentation and production don't obscure her style but clarify and deepen it, expanding the affective reach of her music", and notes that while her earlier work felt more "personal and evocative, like polaroids or sketches", this album "brings to mind the emotional and textural depth of a Walker Evans portrait." Olson concludes by calling the album "such a powerful listen" because of its being "tender like a bruise, like an embrace, like shoots of new growth rising from the ash."

Americana UK's Jonathan Aird noted that Anderson "has found herself wandering into the world of Taureg [sic] style guitar playing, as exemplified by Tinariwen, using this to produce a series of mostly quiet and contemplative pieces which drift hypnotically along", commonly featuring "a drone-like rhythm backing up an intricate and oft repeated melody line, particularly across the first half of the album." Aird called it "a brave decision to strip out guitar parts that rely for their impact on repetition", but noted that "it's noticeable that "Lift" is a more listenable track because there's a few more instruments on it." Aird concluded that the album would "probably not ... grab you by the ears" but probably would better "play happily in the background", and that "for more than half the album" the music is essentially just "the guitar equivalent of the oh so popular 'ambient piano' genre" with the other half being "more or less interesting guitar noodling, a feeling that is emphasized by the hard cuts at the start and end of a couple of the tunes that suggest the preservation of the good bit in an extended improvisation."

== Track listing ==
All tracks are written by Marisa Anderson.

Cloud Corner track listing
No.	Title	Length
1.	"Pulse"	3:02
2.	"Slow Ascent"	4:48
3.	"Angel's Rest"	3:02
4.	"Cloud Corner"	3:22
5.	"Sanctuary"	3:17
6.	"Sun Song"	2:52
7.	"Lament"	4:13
8.	"Sant Feliu de Guíxols"	3:53
9.	"Surfacing"	2:59
10.	"Lift"	4:46
Total length:		36:19

== Personnel ==
- Marisa Anderson – electric guitar, acoustic guitar, charango, requinto guitar, Wurlitzer electronic piano, recording
- Jesse Munro Johnson – mixing
- Timothy Stollenwerk – mastering
- Justin Landis – layout
- Caroline Dossche – cover photo
