= Impossible Truth =

Studio album by William Tyler
- Released: March 19, 2013
- Genre: Folk, indie folk, pop rock
- Length: 54:02
- Label: Merge
- Producer: Mark Nevers

William Tyler chronology
Behold the Spirit (2010)	Impossible Truth (2013)	Modern Country (2016)

Impossible Truth is the second studio album by musician and guitarist William Tyler, which was his first release on Merge Records, and it was produced by Mark Nevers. The album received critical acclaim.

== Critical reception ==
Professional ratings
Aggregate scores
Source	Rating
AnyDecentMusic?	8.1/10
Metacritic	85/100
Review scores
Source	Rating
AllMusic	4/5 stars
Blurt	4/5 stars
Consequence of Sound	4/5 stars
Mojo	4/5 stars
musicOMH	4.5/5 stars
Pitchfork	8.0/10
PopMatters	9/10
Q	4/5 stars
Spin	9/10
Uncut	9/10

Impossible Truth has been acclaimed by music critics. At Metacritic, the album holds a metascore of 85, based on 20 critic reviews. At AnyDecentMusic?, they have a rating of an 8.1/10 for the album, and this is based on 14 critic reviews.

At Spin, David Bevan told that Tyler "takes off and never looks back." Daniel Paton of musicOMH called the album a "clear musical success", and it "is among the year’s most vivid and evocative albums so far, revealing new and absorbing details with every listen." At Uncut, Graeme Thomson wrote that this album "says more with six strings than most records manage with a thousand words." Jez Collins of PopMatters said that "in an age of immediacy and short attention spans, taking the time out to listen to a solo guitar album might be alien for some, but believe me, at no time during its near 54 minutes will you find your mind wandering or your hand twitching for the fast-forward button; you’ll be too immersed in the music for that."

At Mojo, Martin Aston affirmed that this "is an unusually articulate trip." Erin Manning of Consequence of Sound called this "an uncommonly good album." At Q, James Medd highlighted that the release is "possessed and peaceful at once, absorbing and wholly gorgeous." Thom Jurek of Allmusic said that in "reimagining them and altering them just enough to make the entire recording sound at once immediately familiar and somehow wholly other." At Blurt, Jennifer Kelly felt that the release is "like both an empirical observation and an epiphany, a glimpse of the glow behind the world itself." Jayson Greene of Pitchfork called this a "richly satisfying and absorbing record of solo guitar in three years", which he proclaimed it was "gorgeously recorded", and wrote that the album "never once grows tiring."

== Track listing ==
All tracks are written by William Tyler.

Track list
No.	Title	Length
1.	"Country of Illusion"	8:59
2.	"The Geography of Nowhere"	6:22
3.	"Cadillac Desert"	6:37
4.	"We Can't Go Home Again"	6:17
5.	"A Portrait of Sarah"	5:52
6.	"Hotel Catatonia"	4:26
7.	"The Last Residents of Westfall"	5:15
8.	"The World Set Free"	10:14
Total length:		54:02
