= Portland Museum of Modern Art =

Art museum in Portland, Oregon

Coordinates: 45°33′38.0″N 122°40′29.2″W

- Established: 2012
- Dissolved: 2017
- Location: Portland, Oregon, U.S.
- Type: Art
- Founder: Libby Werbel
- Website: portlandmuseumofmodernart.com

Portland Museum of Modern Art (PMOMA) was an art museum in Portland, Oregon. It was founded in 2012 and was closed in 2017. It was located in the basement of Mississippi Records and was founded by curator Libby Werbel. The Museum was staffed by Mississippi Records employees.

== History ==
At its founding, Werbel called the PMOMA "her fake museum." OPB noted that PMOMA is "a tiny space that wittily challenges ideas about the nature of museums and the art-watching experience." The project has received recognition in Artforum, among others, and has been supported by the Precipice Fund, The Calligram Foundation, The Andy Warhol Foundation for the Visual Arts and the Regional Arts & Culture Council.

In September 2016, PMOMA hosted a residency series, Houseguest, on Pioneer Courthouse Square. The PMOMA showcases contemporary folk art.

In 2017, the museum was officially closed after 5 years of operation.

== See also ==
- Culture of Portland, Oregon
