= Goes West =

Studio album by William Tyler
- Released: January 25, 2019
- Studio: Flora Recording & Playback (Portland)
- Genre: Country; folk
- Length: 32:42
- Label: Merge
- Producer: Bradley Cook; Tucker Martine

William Tyler chronology
| Modern Country (2016) | Goes West (2019) | Lost Futures (with Marisa Anderson) (2021) |

Professional ratings
Aggregate scores
| Source | Rating |
|---|---|
| AnyDecentMusic? | 7.5/10 |
| Metacritic | 80/100 |
Review scores
| Source | Rating |
| AllMusic | 4/5 stars |
| American Songwriter | 3.5/5 stars |
| Exclaim! | 8/10 |
| Pitchfork | 7.8/10 |
| PopMatters | 7/10 |
| Uncut | 8/10 |

Goes West is the fourth studio album by American singer-songwriter William Tyler. It was released on January 25, 2019 through Merge Records.

The cover art for Goes West was designed by Robert Beatty.

== Track listing ==
All tracks are written by William Tyler.

Goes West track listing
| No. | Title | Length |
|---|---|---|
| 1. | "Alpine Star" | 5:26 |
| 2. | "Fail Safe" | 3:18 |
| 3. | "Not in Our Stars" | 3:09 |
| 4. | "Call Me When I'm Breathing Again" | 3:00 |
| 5. | "Eventual Surrender" | 3:03 |
| 6. | "Rebecca" | 4:03 |
| 7. | "Venus in Aquarius" | 5:15 |
| 8. | "Virginia Is for Loners" | 3:12 |
| 9. | "Man in a Hurry" | 3:42 |
| 10. | "Our Lady of the Desert" | 3:34 |

== Personnel ==
Credits adapted from the album's liner notes.

- Bradley Cook – production, bass guitar, synthesizers, piano, Omnichord, vibraphone, mandolin
- Tucker Martine – production, engineering, mixing
- Justin R. Chase – engineering assistance
- Joe Lambert – mastering
- Robert Beatty – artwork, design
- William Tyler – vocals, acoustic guitar
- Meg Duffy – electric guitar, loops
- Griffin Goldsmith – drums, percussion
- James Anthony Wallace – piano, organ, vibraphone
- Bill Frisell – electric guitar on "Our Lady of the Desert"

== Charts ==
| Chart | Peak position |
|---|---|
| UK Americana Albums (OCC) | 7 |
| UK Country Albums (OCC) | 2 |
| US Heatseekers Albums (Billboard) | 5 |
| US Independent Albums (Billboard) | 9 |
