= A Brighter Summer Day (album) =

Studio album by Burning Star Core
- Released: February 2002
- Genre: Drone, noise
- Length: 33:09
- Label: Thin Wrist

Burning Star Core chronology
A Brighter Summer Day (2002)	Amelia (2003)

Professional ratings
Review scores
Source	Rating
Allmusic	2.5/5 stars

A Brighter Summer Day is the debut studio album by Burning Star Core, released in February 2002 by Thin Wrist Recordings. After almost ten years of numerous private recordings and self-released recordings, the album marked the first time the project received wide distribution, with five hundred pressings in vinyl.

== Track listing ==
All music is composed by C. Spencer Yeh.

Side one
No.	Title	Length
1.	"A Brighter Summer Day"	16:42

Side two
No.	Title	Length
1.	"Baybe It Wasn't Meant to Me"	16:27

== Personnel ==
Adapted from the A Brighter Summer Day liner notes.

- C. Spencer Yeh – violin (A), electronics (A), computer (B), mixing (A), editing (A)

Production and additional personnel

- John Golden – mastering
- Peter Kolovos – design
- Michael Manning – design
- Chris Rosing – electronics (A), recording (A), photography
- The Wyvern – painting

== Release history ==
Region	Date	Label	Format	Catalog
United States	2002	Thin Wrist	LP	TW-B
