= Challenger (Burning Star Core album) =

Studio album by Burning Star Core
- Released: April 29, 2008
- Recorded: Spring – Winter 2007
- Studio: Ashworth Tap Room, Cincinnati, OH
- Genre: Drone
- Length: 32:59
- Label: Hospital
- Producer: Steve Lowenthal

Burning Star Core chronology
Operator Dead... Post Abandoned (2007)	Challenger (2008)	Papercuts Theater (2010)

Professional ratings
Review scores
Source	Rating
Allmusic	4/5 stars
Pitchfork Media	(7.9/10)

Challenger is the eighth studio album by Burning Star Core, released on April 29, 2008 by Hospital Productions.

== Track listing ==
All music is composed by C. Spencer Yeh.

No.	Title	Length
1.	"Challenger"	4:53
2.	"Beauty Hunter"	5:25
3.	"Through the Bars of a Rhyme"	2:10
4.	"Mezzo Forte"	3:58
5.	"No Memories, No Plans"	2:59
6.	"Hopelessly Devoted"	3:24
7.	"Mysteries of the Organ"	5:59
8.	"Un coeur en hiver"	4:11

== Personnel ==
Adapted from the Operator Dead... Post Abandoned liner notes.

Musicians

- Robert Beatty – Jew's harp (6), cover art
- Trevor Tremaine – guitar (4)
- C. Spencer Yeh – violin, electronics, recording

Production and additional personnel

- Steve Lowenthal – production
- Carl Saff – mastering

== Release history ==
Region	Date	Label	Format	Catalog
United States	2008	Hospital	CD	HOS-216
United States	2008	Plastic	LP	007
