= Acadia (Yasmin Williams album) =

Studio album by Yasmin Williams
- Released: October 4, 2024
- Recorded: January 2023 – March 2024
- Genre: Folk; country
- Length: 45:57
- Label: Nonesuch

Yasmin Williams chronology
Urban Driftwood (2021)	Acadia (2024)

Singles from Acadia
- 1. "Dawning" Released: 21 September 2023; 2. "Virga" Released: 29 July 2024; 3. "Hummingbird" Released: 5 September 2024

Acadia is the third studio album by Yasmin Williams released under Nonesuch Records on October 4, 2024.

== Critical reception ==
Professional ratings
Review scores
Source	Rating
Pitchfork	7.9/10

In a review published by Pitchfork, the album was praised for Williams' innovative usage of instrumentation, namely in terms of her diverse breadth of guitar techniques, alongside the illusory imagery as developed by the atmosphere of the compositions. Recognized by The Fader for its "expansive sound and structure", Ted Davis of Stereogum further lauded the album as "percussive and burbling — imbuing poppy, vocal-driven songwriting with an ample dose of ambition."

== Chart performance ==
The album peaked at No. 100 on the UK Album Downloads Chart, and entered the UK Americana Chart, peaking at No. 39.

== Track listing ==
No.	Title	Length
1.	"Cliffwalk" (featuring Don Flemons)	4:44
2.	"Harvest" (featuring Kaki King, Darian Donovan Thomas)	4:05
3.	"Hummingbird" (featuring Allison de Groot & Tatiana Hargreaves)	5:51
4.	"Virga" (featuring Darlingside)	6:22
5.	"Sisters"	6:57
6.	"Dawning" (featuring Aoife O'Donovan)	6:27
7.	"Dream Lake" (featuring Malick Koly)	4:12
8.	"Nectar" (featuring Margo)	2:59
9.	"Malamu" (featuring Marcus Gilmore & Immanuel Wilkins)	4:20
Total length:		45:57

== Personnel ==
- Yasmin Williams – producer, editor (all tracks)
- Jeff Gruber – engineering and mixing (tracks 1–3, 5–9)
- Ken Lewis – engineering and mixing (track 4)
- Charlie Pilzer – mastering
- Ebru Yildiz – photography
- M.Falconer – painting (cover painting)
- Jeri Heiden – design

== Charts ==
Weekly chart performance for "Acadia"
Chart (2024)	Peak position
UK Album Downloads (Official Charts Company)	100
UK Americana Albums (Official Charts Company)	39
