= Everyday World of Bodies =

Studio album by Burning Star Core
- Released: December 2006
- Recorded: Fall 2005 – Summer 2006
- Studio: Ashworth Tap Room, Cincinnati, OH
- Genre: Drone, noise
- Length: 29:43
- Label: Ultra Eczema

Burning Star Core chronology
Three Sisters Who Share an Eye (2006)	Everyday World of Bodies (2006)	Blood Lightning 2007 (2007)

Everyday World of Bodies is the fourth studio album by Burning Star Core, released on in December 2006 by Ultra Eczema.

== Track listing ==
All music is composed by C. Spencer Yeh.

Side one
No.	Title	Length
1.	"Shoot Me Out the Sky"	5:03
2.	"Swimsuit 2006"	1:51
3.	"Beneath 2 World"	8:26

Side two
No.	Title	Length
1.	"This Moon Will Be Your Grave"	3:19
2.	"Ultimate Surrender"	3:32
3.	"In Love With a Promise"	3:26
4.	"Ultimate Surrender 2"	4:06

== Personnel ==
Adapted from the Everyday World of Bodies liner notes.

- Ron Orovitz – electronics (B2)
- C. Spencer Yeh – Roland synthesizer, electronics, tape, voice

Production and additional personnel

- Dennis Faes – cover art
- Kevin Van Gaver – design

== Release history ==
Region	Date	Label	Format	Catalog
Belgium	2006	Ultra Eczema	LP	UE 40
