= Urban Driftwood =

Studio album by Yasmin Williams
- Released: January 29, 2021
- Genre: Folk; country
- Length: 45:27
- Label: Spinster

Yasmin Williams chronology
Unwind (2018)	Urban Driftwood (2021)	Acadia (2024)

Singles from Urban Driftwood
- 1. "I Wonder" Released: 23 November 2018; 2. "Dragonfly" Released: 10 February 2020

Urban Driftwood is an album by Yasmin Williams released under Spinster on January 29, 2021. The album was written and recorded during 2020, and was inspired by the George Floyd protests.

== Background and recording ==
The album comes after Williams' 2018 debut album, Unwind and features appearances from Taryn Wood and Amadou Kouaye. Williams predominantly uses fingerstyle guitar in the album but at times includes the Mbira and tap shoes. Urban Driftwood was recorded in several studios located in the U.S. state of Maryland.

== Critical reception ==
Professional ratings
Review scores
Source	Rating
Pitchfork	8.0/10

In a review published by Pitchfork, Sam Sodomsky praised the album, writing that it better highlighted Williams' skill as a composer when compared to her first album, Unwind.

== Track listing ==
No.	Title	Length
1.	"Sunshowers"	4:14
2.	"I Wonder (Song for Michael)"	5:23
3.	"Juvenescence"	3:50
4.	"Dragonfly"	4:43
5.	"Swift Breeze"	3:01
6.	"Adrift" (featuring Taryn Wood)	4:05
7.	"Through the Woods"	5:19
8.	"Jarabi"	3:38
9.	"Urban Driftwood" (featuring Amadou Kouyate)	5:01
10.	"After the Storm"	5:42
Total length:		45:27

== Personnel ==
- Yasmin Williams – performance, composition (all)
- Taryn Wood – cello (track 6)
- Amadou Kouyate – Djembe, Cadjembe (track 9)
- Jeff Gruber – engineering and mixing
- Charlie Pilzer – mastering
- Louis Munroe – album art photography
- Sally Anne Morgan - layout design
