= Trío romántico =

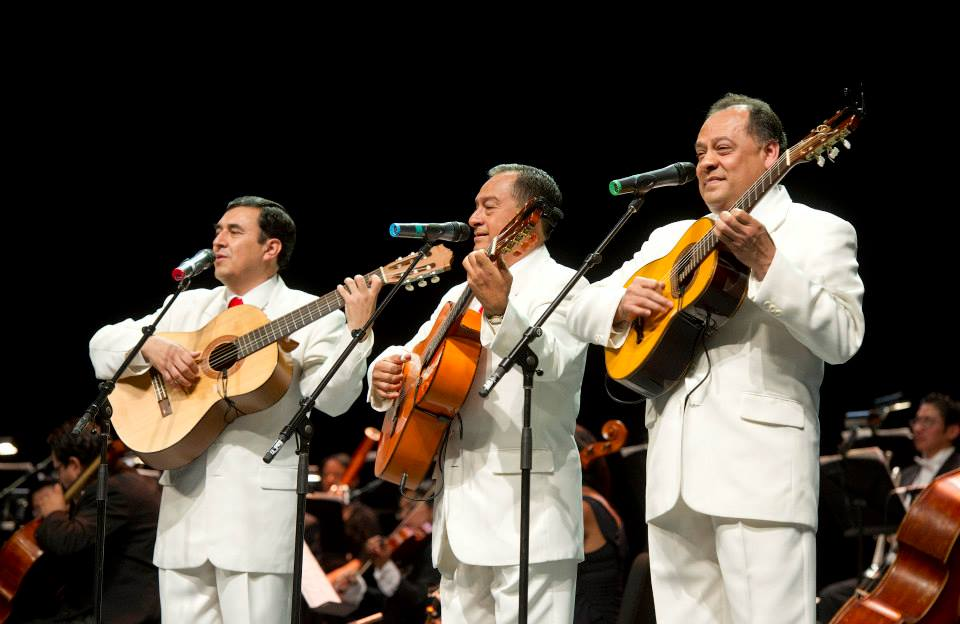
Trío Los Panchos, one of the most successful Mexican tríos of all time.

A trío romántico is a group of vocalists-guitarists, with origins in Mexico and other places in Hispanic America, that performs romantic songs, based on rhythms like bolero, vals and pasillo, mostly.

The ensemble may be composed of three musicians: first guitar, second guitar and requinto guitar. Sometimes it is accompanied by maracas, or one of the guitars may be replaced by a double bass, tololoche, guitarron or Mexican vihuela.

Among the renowned artists are Los Tres Caballeros, Los Panchos, Los Tres Ases, Los Tres Reyes, and the singers Eydie Gormé and Lucho Gatica.
