= Robert Beatty (artist) =

American artist and musician (born 1981)

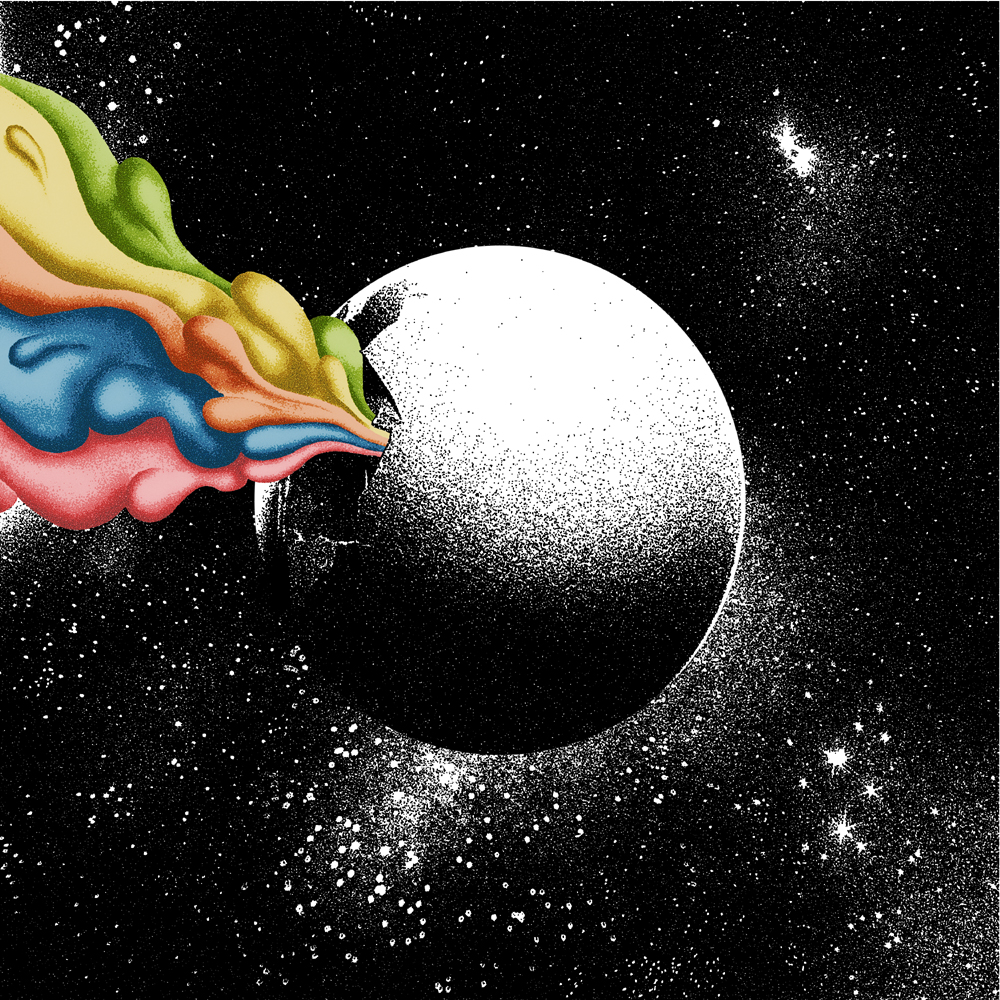
Robert Beatty, artwork for Burning Star Core, Challenger

Robert Beatty (/ˈbeɪti/ BAY-tee; born 1981) is an American artist and musician based in Lexington, Kentucky, best known for his noise band Hair Police, his solo project Three Legged Race, and most recently for his work designing album covers, including Tame Impala's Currents (2015), Kesha's Rainbow (2017), and limited-edition artwork for The Weeknd's Dawn FM (2022).

== Early life ==
Robert Beatty was born in 1981 on a cattle and tobacco farm in rural Kentucky near Nicholasville—"one of the most beautiful places in the world", according to Beatty. Growing up, he "constantly" drew, teaching himself and taking inspiration from MTV's series Liquid Television, Terry Gilliam's animated work, and Mad. He began to experiment with his family camcorder, exploring circuit bending and video feedback, and during high school later started investigating and playing music with a friend (Beatty was fond of music from Warp Records) and designing concert posters.

Beatty never attended art school (or college at all), instead moving to Lexington after high school. He also worked for a time at radio station WRFL, and supported himself for years working at a gas station and as a janitor.

== Artwork ==
Beatty's graphic design work employs a distinctive style which has been called "trippy", "nostalgic", "psychedelic", "dark", and "mystifying;" Beatty tries to evoke a "weird sense of wonder." He began working by hand and today mostly uses Adobe Illustrator and an old version of Photoshop running on a ten-year-old computer to perform his "digital airbrushing", replicating and subverting traditional graphic design techniques using software. However, Beatty says that his work often "goes back to drawing, because that's the simplest thing." A prolific artist, Beatty has designed over 75 album covers; after he decided to pursue creating art for other bands instead of just his own, his album artwork rose in popularity with his covers for Challenger by Burning Star Core in 2008 and Tame Impala's Currents in 2015.

In addition to album art, Beatty's illustration and design work has grown to include concert flyers, magazines, book covers, fashion design, music videos, and news feature illustrations, with clients including Wired and the New York Times. He has also released an artists' book, Floodgate Companion (2016), which Beatty "structured ... more like an experimental film than a book." Beatty also designed the artwork for the soundtrack to the video game Thumper. His video work has been featured at the Anthology Film Archives. In 2019, Beatty created a lyric video for Cage the Elephant's song "House of Glass", from the album Social Cues.

In 2018 he contributed "surreal" art for use in fashion house Dries Van Noten's fall-winter 2018 collection, with his work featured prominently in window displays at European retail locations.

Beatty designed the cover art for historian and photographer Roger Steffens's anthology photobook The Family Acid: California (2019). His work Place Holder appeared at 21c Museum Hotel Lexington in 2019–20, and his concert posters were featured in the 2020 exhibit Cricket Press, John Lackey, and Robert Beatty: Gig Posters and Music Ephemera at the Living Arts and Science Center in Lexington.

His influences include Cal Schenkel, Kenneth Anger, Piotr Kamler, Gary Panter, Terry Gilliam, and Lillian Schwartz. Beatty also credits the film Fantastic Planet (1973).

== Music ==
Beatty performs electronic and noise music solo under his own name and formerly performed under the names Three Legged Race and Ed Sunspot, co-founded Hair Police in 2001 (who went on to open for a Sonic Youth tour), and is or has been a member of experimental and electronic bands Warmer Milks, Burning Star Core, Eyes and Arms of Smoke, and Lexington collective Resonant Hole. He was also a member of Ulysses alongside Apples in Stereo members Robert Schneider and John Ferguson. He records and produces music on old iPhones, stating he works with a "scavenger mentality" and "[doesn't] like to buy new things to make art or music with – I like to wait for things to come to me or to find things at thrift stores".

In 2014 he released the album Soundtracks for Takeshi Murata under his own name.

Beatty also masters music, including Public Housing's 2014 self-titled album.

=== Discography ===
- Three Legged Race – Persuasive Barrier (2012)
- Robert Beatty – Soundtracks for Takeshi Murata (2014)

== Album art ==
- AIDS Wolf – Ma Vie Banale Avant-Garde (2012)
- AMOR – "Paradise/In Love An Arc" (2017)
- AMOR – Sinking Into a Miracle (2018)
- Ariel Pink – Dedicated to Bobby Jameson (2017)
- Bedouine – Bedouine (2017)
- Bedouine – Bird Songs of a Killjoy (2019)
- Burning Star Core – Challenger (2008)
- C. Spencer Yeh – The RCA Mark II (2017)
- Charlie Hilton – Palana (2016)
- Chris Forsyth & Solar Motel Band — The Rarity of Experience Pts. I & II (2016)
- Chris Forsyth – All Time Present (2019)
- Christian Lee Hutson - "Strawberry Lemonade" (2021), "Quitters" (2022)
- Cola Boyy – Black Boogie Neon (2018)
- Cross – Die Forever (2012)
- Damaged Bug – Cold Hot Plumbs (2015)
- Dent May – Across the Multiverse (2017)
- Don't DJ – Musique Acéphale (2017)
- The Dream Syndicate – These Times (2019)
- Drugdealer – The End of Comedy (2016)
- Drugdealer – Raw Honey (2019)
- Ed Schrader's Music Beat – Riddles (2018)
- Eric Lanham – The Sincere Interruption (2012)
- Fielded – Drip Drip (2018)
- The Flaming Lips — Oczy Mlody (2017)
- Forma — Physicalist (2016)
- Ga'an – Black Equus (2011)
- GUM – The Underdog (2018)
- Hassara – backyard I-III (2007)
- Idiot Glee – Paddywhack (2016)
- Kesha – Rainbow (2017)
- Knife Knights – 1 Time Mirage (2018)
- La Big Vic – Cold War (2013)
- Lord Raja – A Constant Moth (2014)
- Major Stars – Roots of Confusion Seeds of Joy (2019)
- Mdou Moctar – Ilana: The Creator (2019)
- Mister Heavenly – Boxing the Moonlight (2017)
- Mondo Drag – Mondo Drag(2015)
- Mort Garson – Mother Earth's Plantasia (2019 reissue)
- Neon Indian – "Annie" (2015)
- Oneohtrix Point Never — Commissions I (2014)
- Oneohtrix Point Never — Magic Oneohtrix Point Never (2020)
- Oneohtrix Point Never — R Plus Seven (2013)
- Oneohtrix Point Never – Russian Mind (2009)
- Outer Space – Akashic Record (2012)
- Peaking Lights – Lucifer (2012)
- The Phantom Band – Strange Friend (2014)
- Real Estate – "Easy" (2017)
- Real Estate – In Mind (2017)
- Raglani – Husk (2012)
- Roland Kayn – A Little Electronic Milky Way of Sound (2017)
- Salvia Plath – The Bardo Story (2013)
- Secret Circuit — Afterlife (2013)
- Sheer Mag – A Distant Call (2019)
- Steve Hauschildt – Dissolvi (2018)
- Tame Impala – "Cause I'm a Man" (2015)
- Tame Impala — Currents (2015)
- Thee Oh Sees — A Weird Exits (2016)
- Thee Oh Sees — An Odd Entrances (2016)
- Oh Sees — Orc (2017)
- Three Legged Race – Persuasive Barrier (2012)
- Tim Heidecker – Fear of Death (2020)
- U.S. Girls – In a Poem Unlimited (2018)
- The Weeknd – Dawn FM (2022)
- White Suns – Psychic Drift (2017)
- William Tyler – Goes West (2019)
- Wooden Wand – Briarwood (2011)

== Music Videos ==
- Boards of Canada — Introit / Prophecy at 1420 MHz (2026)

== Bibliography ==
- Beatty, Robert (2016). Floodgate Companion. Portland, OR: Floating World Comics. ISBN 9781942801986. OCLC 1033512652.
