= Three Sisters Who Share an Eye =

Studio album by Burning Star Core
- Released: June 2006
- Recorded: Autumn 2005
- Studio: Ashworth Tap Room, Cincinnati, OH
- Genre: Drone, noise
- Length: 29:39
- Label: No Fun

Burning Star Core chronology
Mes Soldats Stupides '96 - '04 (2005)	Three Sisters Who Share an Eye (2006)	Everyday World of Bodies (2006)

Three Sisters Who Share an Eye is the third studio album by Burning Star Core, released on in June 2006 by No Fun Productions. Arthur magazine called it "essential listening from top to bottom" that "blows doors on everything around it."

== Track listing ==
All music is composed by C. Spencer Yeh.

Side one
No.	Title	Length
1.	"[untitled]"	14:52

Side two
No.	Title	Length
1.	"[untitled]"	14:43

== Personnel ==
Adapted from the Three Sisters Who Share an Eye liner notes.

- C. Spencer Yeh – electronics, voice
- The Wyvern – cover art

== Release history ==
Region	Date	Label	Format	Catalog
United States	2006	No Fun	LP	NFP-05
