= Burning Star Core =

American musical group

- Also known as: BxC
- Origin: Cincinnati, Ohio, United States
- Genres: Drone, noise, ambient
- Years active: 1993–present
- Labels: DroneDisco
- Members: C. Spencer Yeh
- Website: dronedisco.com

Burning Star Core is the experimental music project of violinist C. Spencer Yeh. Originally conceived 1993 in Cincinnati, the project is currently based in Brooklyn, New York. Composing music that's driven by his violin, Yeh's Burning Star Core project is known for its unique blend of musique concrète, ambient, drone, and psychedelic music. His albums A Brighter Summer Day (2002), Blood Lightning 2007 (2007), Operator Dead... Post Abandoned (2007) and Challenger (2008) received favorable write-ups from critics.

== History ==
Burning Star Core was founded C. Spencer Yeh in 1993. The idea for the project arose from Yeh's desire to produce music that broke barriers and challenged traditional perceptions of music. He began releasing his music on his own Drone Disco label via cassette and CDr. In 2002, Burning Star Core released A Brighter Summer Day, marking the first time the project received wider distribution. The Very Heart of the World followed in 2006, with Zach Baron of Pitchfork Media saying "Yeh can play, but he also doesn't mind mucking up the works with the wet noise, gibberish talk, and free percussion that gives The Very Heart of the World its elevation-of-everyday-life punch." 2007's Operator Dead... Post Abandoned was favorably compared to other experimental rock bands such as Soft Machine and Rake.

== Discography ==
Studio albums

- A Brighter Summer Day (2002)
- The Very Heart of the World (2005)
- Three Sisters Who Share an Eye (2006)
- Everyday World of Bodies (2006)
- Blood Lightning 2007 (2007)
- Operator Dead... Post Abandoned (2007)
- Challenger (2008)

Collaborative albums

- with The Hototogisu: II (2006)
- with The Hototogisu: Hototogisu + Burning Star Core (2006)
- with Yellow Swans: Yellow Swans & Burning Star Core (2007)
- with Prurient: Ghosts of Niagara (2008)
- with The Hototogisu: Untitled (2008)

Compilation albums

- Mes Soldats Stupides '96 - '04 (2005)

Live albums

- West Coast Spring 2004 (2004)
- Papercuts Theater (2010)

Extended plays

- Amelia (2003)
- Physical Culture (2005)

Singles

- with Coltrane Motion: Datawaslost Split Single.02 (2002)
- with Comets on Fire: Comets on Fire/Burning Star Core (2005)
- Untitled (2006)
- WSBC/SSS (2007)
- Body Blues (2007)
- with DEL: BXC/DEL (2010)

Cassette releases

- Hello? (1998)
- Drone Disco .98 (1998)
- Green Legs II (1998)
- Tabletop Bass Guitar (1998)
- Romantic Fall - Live 2002 (2002)
- 4-25-03 SGH (2003)
- Amplified Body Sound (2003)
- Tell Me Burning Something (2004)
- USA Live Reports Spring 2005 (2005)
- What Happens When You Come Home and All That's Left of Her Is Her Hat? (2005)
- Sun Starved Sky Scrapers (2005)
- Two in the KY & One in the OH 2005 (2006)
- Sold Alive (2006)
- Sky Movies (2006)
- The Static You Hear Is the Rain (1999-2004) (2006)
- The 'Labyrinth of the Minotaur' Spring Tour: United Kingdom Live Report 2006 (2007)
- Sword Swallower's Opera (2008)
- Live From New York (2009)
- with Noveller, Pete Swanson, King Felix: Go for the Gold (2012)

CDr releases

- Live Documents 1997 – 1999 (1999)
- Hello?! (1999)
- Background Sound & Applause (2001)
- Live in Oxford, OH 4.06.02 (2002)
- Cafe Tattoo (After) 3/16/03 (2003)
- White Swords in a Black Castle (2003)
- A Pair of Earrings From an Unnamed Property (2003)
- Human Pork Chop (2003)
- Crystal Castles (2003)
- Live on Art Damage (2003)
- Shapes of Autumn 2003 (2003)
- Inside the Shadow (2005)
- Let's Play Wild Like Wildcats Do (2005)
- with Comets on Fire: Untitled (2005)
- with Lambsbread: Live in St. Louis (2006)
- See You in 2004 (2006)
- Ten Vocal Loops (2006)
- Voice & Electronics Live 8/25/05 (2006)
- Fascination (2008)
- with Mike Shiflet: Tour : 11:03 (2009)
