= Rick Anthony =

- Also known as: Rick Redbeard
- Born: 11 February 1979 (age 47)
- Origin: Aberdeenshire, Scotland
- Genres: Indie folk, alt-country, alternative
- Instruments: Vocals, guitar, piano
- Years active: 2002–present
- Labels: Chemikal Underground, Gerry Loves Records, Kingfisher Bluez

Rick Anthony (born 11 February 1979) is a Scottish singer and songwriter originally from Aberdeenshire and now based in Glasgow. He is the lead singer and guitarist in the alternative rock band The Phantom Band and also performs as a solo act and releases music under the pseudonym Rick Redbeard.

== Rick Redbeard ==
Anthony began performing solo shows sometime in the mid-2000s, assuming the name Rick Redbeard due partly to its pirate connotations. A notable show during this early period was an appearance at the 2007 Connect Music Festival on the Yoursound Bandstand alongside other emerging Scottish acts such as Frightened Rabbit and The Twilight Sad. His music is generally categorised as alternative country or alternative folk music and has been likened in sound to Leonard Cohen, Bill Callahan and Will Oldham among others.

As The Phantom Band gained popularity after the release of their debut album Checkmate Savage in 2009, his solo work remained in the background until June 2012 when Anthony released the track 'Now We’re Dancing' as a split 7" single Now We're Dancing/Vanishing Tanks with Adam Stafford on the Gerry Loves Records micro-label in Edinburgh. This was the first release of any kind under the Rick Redbeard name and was followed by a small joint headline tour of Scotland.

In January 2013 Chemikal Underground records released the debut Rick Redbeard album No Selfish Heart. This release was followed by a headline tour of the UK in March including sold out shows in Aberdeen's Peacock Visual Arts Centre and Glasgow's Centre for Contemporary Arts.

In July 2014, shortly after the release of The Phantom Band's third record Strange Friend, Kingfisher Bluez, a Vancouver-based micro-label, released a 7-inch Rick Redbeard single Dreams of the Trees featuring the title track and two other previously unreleased songs.

In 2015, Anthony recorded music for the short documentary The Third Dad which premiered at the Edinburgh International Film Festival in 2015.

In April 2016, the release of a compilation album called Refugee was announced. Organised by Glasgow-based musician Robin Adams and inspired by the ongoing refugee crisis in the Mediterranean, the record will be released in June 2016 with proceeds from the sale going to the Migrant Offshore Aid Station in Malta. It features a previously unreleased Rick Redbeard song called 'Postcards' along with new material from Bonnie 'Prince' Billy, Alasdair Roberts, Linda Thompson and others.

The second Rick Redbeard album Awake Unto was released by Chemikal Underground records on 17 June 2016.

== Solo discography ==
Albums

- No Selfish Heart (Chemikal Underground, 2013)
- Awake Unto (Chemikal Underground, 2016)

Singles

- "Now We're Dancing/Vanishing Tanks" split 7-inch single with Adam Stafford (Gerry Loves Records, 2012)
- "Dreams of the Trees" 7-inch single (Kingfisher Bluez, 2014)
