= Connect Music Festival =

Music festival in Scotland

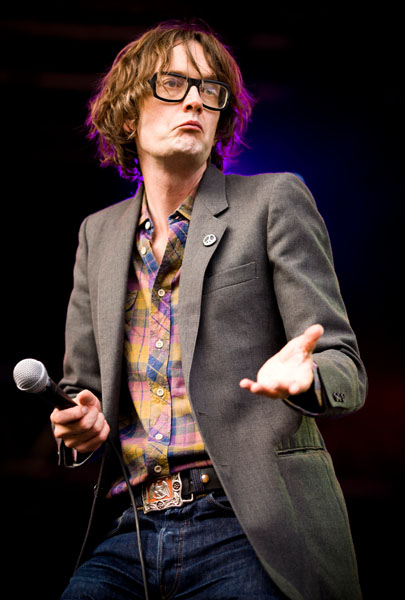
- Jarvis Cocker performing on the main stage of the inaugural Connect Music Festival held on the banks of Loch Fyne on the west coast of Scotland, UK
- Genre: Alternative rock, Punk rock, Indie rock, Dance
- Locations: Inveraray Castle, Loch Fyne, Argyll, Scotland
- Years active: 2007, 2008, 2022, 2023
- Founders: DF Concerts
- Website: connectmusicfestival.com

Connect Music Festival is a Scottish music festival promoted by DF Concerts. It debuted in 2007 and 2008 on the banks of Loch Fyne at Inveraray Castle, drawing headline sets from the Beastie Boys and Franz Ferdinand. After a 14‑year hiatus the event was relaunched in August 2022 at the Royal Highland Centre Showgrounds beside Edinburgh Airport, pitching itself at “music fans who have grown out of T in the Park. Connect 2022 was headlined by The National, The Chemical Brothers and Idles; the 2023 edition featured Primal Scream, Fred again. and boygenius, attracting about 25,000 attendees over three days. Promoters confirmed a “fallow year” for 2024, stating that Edinburgh Summer Sessions will use the site instead.

The new format of Connect is aimed at more mature music fans and welcomed headliners such as The National, The Chemical Brothers and Idles in 2022. Jon Hopkins, Bonobo, Mogwai, Little Simz, and Bombay Bicycle Club are amongst the names to have played in 2022.

The 2023 festival included headliners Primal Scream, Fred again.., boygenius, and Loyle Carner along with Franz Ferdinand, Young Fathers, Confidence Man, Friendly Fires, Arab Strap and many more.

As well as a diverse music programme, Connect highlights the importance of wellbeing and community throughout the event with a plethora of comedy, spoken word, visual arts, and locally sourced food and drink, alongside a wellness programme featuring yoga, cold water therapy, life coaching, breathworks and motivational talks.

For 2022 and 2023, Connect teamed up with Scotland-based charity Tiny Changes, which was set up in memory of Frightened Rabbit singer Scott Hutchison. The Tiny Changes x Gardeners Cottage featured acoustic sets from musicians as well as secret sets which are announced on the day. The 2022 festival saw headliners The National play a secret acoustic set to rave reviews.

In February 2024 the festival promoters DF Concerts announced that 2024 will be a fallow year for the festival, with the Edinburgh Summer Sessions taking place at the location instead.

== Format ==
The revived festival is composed of four stages of music and two other areas:

- The Grand Parade - Main Stage hosting the headline acts and other bands
- Guitars & Other Machines - More popular and less well known music acts
- Unknown Pleasures - Electronic and Dance acts
- Tiny Changes x Gardeners Cottage - Acoustic and secret sets
- The Speakeasy - Comedy, live podcast recordings, sustainability talks, spoken word
- Rest & Be Thankful - Yoga, meditation, breathworks

== 2007 Festival ==
The festival was held between 31 August and 2 September 2007.

=== Lineup ===
==== Oyster Stage ====
Friday	Saturday	Sunday
Beastie Boys; The Jesus and Mary Chain; Jarvis Cocker; Cansei de Ser Sexy; Trashcan Sinatras; Steven Lindsay; Amy Macdonald	Primal Scream; Mogwai; Teenage Fanclub; The Divine Comedy; The Hold Steady; The Only Ones; The Fire Engines; 1990s	Björk; LCD Soundsystem; M.I.A.; Regina Spektor; Craig Armstrong; Scott Matthews; Seasick Steve; Patrick Wolf

==== Guitars & Other Machines ====
Friday	Saturday	Sunday
The Go! Team; Super Furry Animals; King Creosote; Aereogramme (the band's last ever gig); Jamie Scott and the Town; Captain; Stephen Fretwell; Make Model	Modest Mouse; Echo & the Bunnymen; Sons & Daughters; Rilo Kiley; Vashti Bunyan; Bat for Lashes; Astrid Williamson; The Parsonage Choir	Idlewild; Big Star; The Polyphonic Spree; Seth Lakeman; My Latest Novel; Tilly and the Wall; Newton Faulkner; The Kissaway Trail

==== Manicured Noise ====
Friday	Saturday	Sunday
Nouvelle Vague; Optimo; The Aliens; Alex Smoke; Vector Lovers; Palladium; Big Face; Dblspk DJs; Sleepless Crew	Kieran Hebden aka Four Tet & Steve Reid; Black Dog; Slam; Two Gallants; Nathan Fake; Marcia Blaine School For Girls; Numbers DJs	Hot Chip; Tom Middleton & Fred Deakin present Cosmic Fury; Paul Hartnoll's Ideal Connection; The Bays; Candie Payne; Harri and Domenic; Octogen; Aqualung; Jim Hutchison and Brian Murnin

==== Your Sound ====
The bandstand stage, set for new and rising bands, included performances from Frightened Rabbit (Saturday), Rick Redbeard (Saturday), The Kazoo Funk Orchestra (Sunday), and The Twilight Sad (Sunday, playing directly following headliner Björk).

== 2008 Festival ==
In 2008, the festival changed its name to Hydro Connect due to sponsorship from Scottish Hydro Electric. It was held between Friday 29 August and Sunday 31 August.

=== Line-up ===
Artists performing included Manic Street Preachers, Bloc Party, Franz Ferdinand, Amy MacDonald, Sigur Rós, Goldfrapp, Paolo Nutini, Kasabian, Glasvegas, Mercury Rev, Gossip, Elbow, Duffy, The Coral, Ladytron, The Roots, Sparks, Crystal Castles, Young Knives, Santigold, Joan As Police Woman, Gomez, Foy Vance and Noah and the Whale.

== 2022 Festival ==
On 22nd February 2022, it was announced that organisers DF Concerts would be bringing back Connect in its new home of Royal Highland Centre Showgrounds, Edinburgh, on 26-28 August. While this new edition of Connect is not a camping festival in the traditional sense, there was luxury and boutique camping facilities available, including pre-pitched bell tents. There was also four hotels all within walking distance of the festival site due to its proximity to Edinburgh Airport.

Talking about the relaunch, CEO of DF Concerts Geoff Ellis said that the reason for choosing this location was due to the public transport links, helping make the event more sustainable.

Grand Parade 2022
Friday	Saturday	Sunday
Idles	The Chemical Brothers	The National
Jon Hopkins	Bonobo	Mogwai
John Grant	The Twilight Sad	Bombay Bicycle Club
Jessie Buckly & Bernard Butler	Caribou	Little Simz
The Mysterines	Holly Humberstone	Self Esteem
Charlotte Adigery & Bolis Pupal	Chloe Moriondo	Black Country, New Road
Future Utopia	Lucia & The Best Boys	Rae Morris
Maeve		Rachel Chinouriri

Guitars & Other Machines 2022
Friday	Saturday	Sunday
Joesef	Ride	Idlewild
Moses Boyd	LOW	Admiral Fallow
CMAT	Matt Maltese	Sudan Archives
LYRA	Willie J Healy	DEHD
Cloth	NewDad	Hamish Hawk
Jealous of the Birds	Swim School	Lizzie Reid
LVRA	The Joy Hotel	Kathleen Frances
	Opus Kink	

Unknown Pleasures
Friday	Saturday	Sunday
Optimo (Espacio)	Erol Alkan	Horse Meat Disco
I.Jordan	Krystal Klear	Sam Gellaitry
Hammer	Dance System	Jamz Supernova
TAAHLIAH	Nightwave	Barry Can't Swim
KILIMANJARO	Push It	Rebecca Vasmant
Pocket	Nadia Summer B2B DIJA	Karma Kid

== 2023 Festival ==
The 2023 edition took place on 25–27 August at the Royal Highland Showgrounds, Edinburgh. Night one had two of Scotland’s biggest rock bands in Primal Scream and Franz Ferdinand.

== 2024 Festival ==
Organizers decided not to hold the festival to build the "next edition" of it. Organisers said: "We've decided to take a break with Connect Music Festival in 2024 to take the time to build the next edition of the festival.
