= Strange Friend =

Studio album by The Phantom Band
- Released: 2 June 2014
- Genre: Indie rock
- Length: 45:27
- Label: Chemikal Underground

The Phantom Band chronology
The Wants (2010)	Strange Friend (2014)

Strange Friend is the third studio album by Scottish indie rock band The Phantom Band, released on 2 June 2014 through Chemikal Underground Records.

== Reception ==
Professional ratings
Aggregate scores
Source	Rating
Metacritic	76/100
Review scores
Source	Rating
Allmusic	4/5 stars
Clash	(8/10)
Drowned in Sound	(9/10)
God is in the TV Zine	5/5 stars
Line of Best Fit	7.5/10 stars
The List	4/5 stars
Mojo	4/5 stars
NME	(8/10)
Q	3/5 stars
The Scotsman	4/5 stars
The Skinny	4/5 stars

Jon Dennis of The Guardian observed a new sound for The Phantom Band: "The melodies flutter around the tonic note like Caledonian reels, but this is not folk music... the use of vintage synths means they're closer to Orchestral Manoeuvres in the Dark than to Big Country."

== Track listing ==
No.	Title	Length
1.	"The Wind That Cried The World"	4:40
2.	"Clapshot"	5:26
3.	"Doom Patrol"	5:00
4.	"Atacama"	3:47
5.	"(Invisible) Friends"	3:57
6.	"Sweatbox"	5:23
7.	"No Shoes Blues"	6:12
8.	"Women Of Ghent"	6:22
9.	"Galápagos"	4:40

== Personnel ==
- Duncan Marquiss
- Gerry Hart
- Andy Wake
- Rick Anthony
- Iain Stewart
- Greg Sinclair
