= The Phantom Band =

Scottish indie rock band

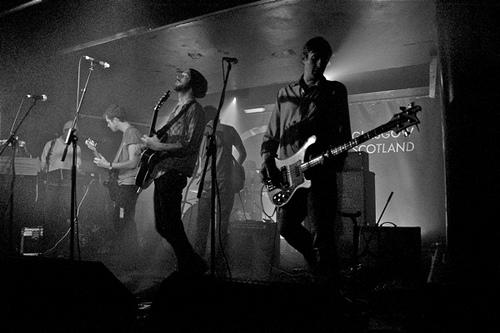
- Performing in Glasgow's Oran Mor in 2009

Background information
- Origin: Glasgow, Scotland
- Genres: Indie rock
- Years active: 2002-present
- Label: Chemikal Underground
- Members: Duncan Marquiss; Gerry Hart; Andy Wake; Rick Anthony; Iain Stewart; Greg Sinclair
- Past members: Damien Tonner (drums) 2002-2010

The Phantom Band is a Scottish indie rock band based in Glasgow, consisting of Duncan Marquiss (guitar), Gerry Hart (bass), Andy Wake (keyboards), Rick Anthony (vocals and guitar), Iain Stewart (drums) and Greg Sinclair (guitars). They are often generally described as indie rock but are known to utilize a variety of genres and styles. The band's debut album Checkmate Savage was released in January 2009 (rereleased on vinyl in January 2019) and the follow-up The Wants in October 2010. In June 2014, the band released their third record, Strange Friend followed by Fears Trending in January 2015.

== Early history (2002–2008) ==
The band initially performed and released material under various names, never sticking with the same band-name for long: NRA, Les Crazy Boyz, Los Crayzee Boyz, Tower of Girls, Wooden Trees. In 2005, using the adopted name Robert Redford, the band released a one-off CDR titled The Mummy and Daddy Dance on their own temporary label Extreme Nudity, self distributed to independent record outlets in the UK, before removing all reference to it from their online presence and reforming under a new name, Robert Louis Stevenson. The sought-after release now only changes hands on online auction sites, and the only element traceable from the band's current incarnation is the presence of the track "Crocodile" (formerly "Crocodile Dundee") on their 2009 album Checkmate Savage.

Under the title of Robert Louis Stevenson, they played a number of live shows in Glasgow (Stereo, Nice'n'Sleazy) and Edinburgh (Wee Red Bar) and released a limited run of 150 audio cassettes under band member Nobodaddy (Wake's DJing alter-ego) and Hugo Paris' home imprint, Sweat on Cassette.

Regarding the band's early name changes vocalist Rick Anthony states:

We never really took things too seriously to start with so we didn’t think twice about changing our name so much, or asking promoters to pick ones for us. I guess it could be considered a little perverse, but it allowed us the freedom to experiment with different forms of music, and it was also kind of fun. I think we gradually realised that it was potentially as alienating for people as it was amusing for us, and once we had played a few shows under the name The Phantom Band, without anyone complaining, it made sense to stick with it. Also, by that point, we had reached a level of musical expression that was more in tune with what we were aiming for as a band, so I think we were all a bit more comfortable with the idea of settling on something.

In 2006, the band began using The Phantom Band as their name (apparently in reference to their elusive activities up to that point) and, in 2007, released a 7" single, "Throwing Bones", on the London-based Trial & Error Recordings. The critical acclaim of this single, their first fully distributed release, was the impetus for their signing to Chemikal Underground.

Prior to the release of their debut album the band appeared at a number of UK festivals including Hydro Connect 2008 (Your Sound Bandstand), Tales of the Jackalope 2007 (Unspecified Stage), The Wickerman Festival, 20 July 2007 (Solus Stage), and the Wye Fayre 2007, 7 July 2007 (Flying Monkey Stage), They also played their first show outside the United Kingdom at the Crossing Border festival in Den Haag, the Netherlands in November 2008.

== Checkmate Savage (2008–2010) ==
After signing with Chemikal Underground, the band began recording their debut album early in 2008. Despite planning on recording the album in a few weeks in the labels Chem19 studios in Blantyre, the whole session ended up spanning many months and was mixed at Franz Ferdinand's studios in Govan. Checkmate Savage was eventually released in January 2009 to critical acclaim, and it peaked on the UK Albums Chart at number 181 in February of that year.

The release of Checkmate Savage led to several UK and European tours for the band including sell-out shows in Glasgow King Tuts, London Macbeth, Inverness Hootananny and Manchester Deaf Institute. They also played in venues across Germany, France, Ireland, Belgium, the Netherlands and Switzerland. Festival appearances during this period include: T in the Park, Belladrum, Stag and Dagger (which took place in Leeds, London and Glasgow), London Calling in Amsterdam, the Storasfestivalen near Trondheim, The Great Escape in Brighton, Sound City in Liverpool and, towards the end of 2009, the Transmusicales festival in Rennes.

Early in 2010, the band once again returned to Chem19 to begin work on their second album.

== The Wants (2010–2011) ==
The recording sessions for the band's second album were quite difficult - even more so than the first record. Much of the music was written in the studio and under quite tight time constraints and this seems to have led to some difficulties within the band. Sometime in the summer of 2010, between the records completion and its release, the band parted ways with original drummer Damien Tonner. The band made a number of festival appearances around this time including the Commercial Alternative] festival in Glasgow, the Standon Calling Festival and the Electric Elephant Festival in Croatia.

The Wants was released in October 2010 to critical acclaim. On the day of its release the band travelled to the United States of America to appear at the CMJ festival in New York. Directly after this the band supported Frightened Rabbit on a string of dates during their headline tour including shows in Boston, Philadelphia, Washington, New York and Chicago. On returning to the United Kingdom the band embarked on a small tour of their own culminating in a sold out show at Oran Mor in Glasgow.

In March 2011, they completed a two-month tour of Europe. Beginning in Ireland at the end of January the group then travelled through France, Switzerland, Germany, Denmark, Sweden, Norway, Belgium, the Netherlands and Great Britain.

Throughout the summer of 2011 the band appeared on the stages of many UK and European festivals including: Latitude (Suffolk), The Great Escape Festival (Brighton), Friends of Mine (Manchester), Walk the Line (Den Haag), A.F.F. (Genk), Tramlines (Sheffield), Camden Crawl (London), Summer Sundae (Leicester), Belladrum (Inverness-shire) and T in the Park (Kinross-shire). At the T in the Park festival, the band recorded a live acoustic version of the track "Everybody Knows it's True" for the final show of the BBC's festival coverage.

In December 2011, The Phantom Band rounded off the year by staging two shows in conjunction with arts collective 85A in Glasgow's Stereo venue entitled 'A Phestive Phantomime' and featuring performance art, films and live performances from a variety of bands.

== Strange Friend and Fears Trending (2014–2015) ==
The band returned to the studio in 2013 to record the follow-up to The Wants. Largely self-produced, their third record Strange Friend was released on 2 June 2014 followed by a short tour of the United Kingdom and several summer festival dates.

Later in 2014 the band announced the release of their fourth studio album, Fears Trending. The album came out on 26 January 2015. It was recorded during the same sessions as the band's previous album.

In October 2015 the band embarked on a European tour. They played in Berlin, Munich, Vienna, Hamburg, Cologne, Luxembourg, Zurich, Paris and Lille. After the gig in Lille on 20 October 2015 all of the band's equipment, worth over £13,000, was stolen from their tour van. The remaining dates of the tour in Brighton and Liverpool were cancelled and, despite strong support, the band have not played live since.

== Discography ==
=== Studio albums ===
- Checkmate Savage (2009)
- The Wants (2010)
- Strange Friend (2014)
- Fears Trending (2015)

=== Singles ===
- "Throwing Bones" (2007)
- "The Howling" (2009)

== Other projects ==
Most of the band are active in other musical projects. Singer Rick Anthony writes and performs solo as Rick Redbeard, while drummer Iain Stewart is one half of experimental rock duo Bronto Skylift, as well as a member of Cuttys Gym. Also some members of the band (mainly Duncan Marquiss, Andy Wake and Greg Sinclair) perform occasionally at art-related events as an improvisational ensemble called Omnivore Demon.
