= The Quickening (Jim White and Marisa Anderson album) =

2020 studio album

Studio album by Jim White and Marisa Anderson
- Released: May 15, 2020
- Recorded: 2018
- Studio: Type Foundry, Portland, Oregon; Estudios Noviembres, Mexico City
- Genre: Experimental
- Length: 38:25
- Label: Thrill Jockey

Jim White chronology
| Mark Kozelek With Ben Boye and Jim White 2 (2020) | The Quickening (2020) | All Hits: Memories (2024) |

Marisa Anderson chronology
| Cloud Corner (2018) | The Quickening (2020) | Lost Futures (with William Tyler) (2021) |

Singles from The Quickening
- 1. "The Lucky" Released: March 11, 2020; 2. "Gathering" and "Pallet" Released: April 29, 2020

The Quickening is a collaborative studio album by Australian drummer Jim White and American guitarist Marisa Anderson, released May 15, 2020, by Thrill Jockey. The album was recorded between Portland and Mexico City.

== Background ==
The album was first announced March 11, 2020, along with the release of lead single "The Lucky". The song features Anderson playing a guitar she bought from a Mexico City luthier on a whim. Later singles "Gathering" and "Pallet" were released together on April 29. The former is said to "harken back to Anderson's playing with the improv-heavy Evolutionary Jass Band, carrying a sense of perpetual motion", while the latter "is an abstraction of the old folk song "Make Me a Pallet on Your Floor", trickling out with molasses-like waves of subtle melody and brushwork."

The idea of making an album together first formed while Anderson and White were touring together in 2015, Anderson playing solo while White played in his duo Xylouris White. They started by recording improvisations at Portland's Type Foundry in late 2018, before finished their work at Estudios Noviembres in Mexico City. They didn't rehearse or perform together prior to the recording sessions because, per White, "it's good to suspend disbelief at this stage of playing." The goal for the album was "total improvisation, built on interwoven 'melodic flourishes' and the trading of 'conversational exchanges.'"

== Style and reception ==
The Quickening
Aggregate scores
| Source | Rating |
|---|---|
| Metacritic | 74/100 |
Review scores
| Source | Rating |
| AllMusic | 4/5 stars |
| Exclaim! | 7/10 |
| Pitchfork | 7.8 |
| PopMatters | 7/10 |
| The Sydney Morning Herald | 4/5 stars |

According to the review aggregator Metacritic, The Quickening received "generally favorable reviews" based on a weighted average score of 74 out of 100 from 8 critic scores. Exclaim! writer Daniel Sylvester says that "Although Jim White and Marisa Anderson never seem to give themselves enough time or space to truly stretch out, The Quickening nonetheless captures two masters at their most free." PopMatters's Steve Horowitz writes that "The two musicians got together because of a shared appreciation of improvisation. The results suggest the pair shared the same aims as the sound of them both together overwhelms their separate performances. Fans of both artists will find value in their union." Horowitz also delivers a "warning to the uninitiated" that "this is experimental music" where the "result can sound like two people discordantly warming up one moment and then incandescently charming the next. There are no strict melodies, rhythms, or tempos as much as there are constantly changing ones delivered in a kind of spiritual conversation. The magic of music itself is the rationale and motivation for what gets performed.

Mxdwn.com's Austin Woods says the two musicians "trade melodic lines like they are retorts", with Anderson being "especially skilled at imitating speech patterns in her playing" and the music "never com[ing] across as self-indulgent like so much improvised music does, as White and Anderson both know when it's time to scale it back and let the other shine." Their "synergy leads to plenty of exciting moments" such as when opening track "Gathering" "achieves a lush, purifying climax through the dense interplay of Anderson's hazy, watercolor guitar drones and White's skittering drums." "Gathering" is "transcendent and maximalist" in contrast to the "quieter and more subdued" "Unwritten" "which highlights their penchant for call and response." "The Other Christmas Song" is "loose and dreamy, with Anderson's watery guitar chords pouring down in cascades, like something from a Sonic Youth track, only much kinder and more inviting", with Anderson managing to "find room amidst the downpour to slip in some tasty melodic lines, counterbalanced by White's machine-gun drums". In contrast, "Last Days" is "a bit tighter and more focused", fully displaying "Anderson's roots in Americana ... as she plays with a ramshackle, country-fried twang" and the duo "sneaking in a surreal, almost Beefheartian edge, with some discordance here and there and a jarring, angular drum pattern."

== Track listing ==
The Quickening track listing
| No. | Title | Length |
|---|---|---|
| 1. | "Gathering" | 3:44 |
| 2. | "Unwritten" | 2:19 |
| 3. | "The Lucky" | 4:03 |
| 4. | "The Other Christmas Song" | 4:35 |
| 5. | "Last Days" | 5:02 |
| 6. | "Diver" | 3:56 |
| 7. | "The Quickening" | 5:14 |
| 8. | "Pallet" | 3:15 |
| 9. | "18 to 1" | 3:25 |
| 10. | "November" | 2:50 |
| Total length: | | 38:25 |

== Personnel ==
- Marisa Anderson – guitars
- Jim White – drums
- Greg Norman – mixing
- Timothy Stollenwerk – mastering
- Emilio Anaya – recording engineer (1, 3–9)
- Luis Gutierrez – photography, recording engineer (1, 3–9)
- Rubén Rodríguez – recording engineer (1, 3–9)
- Jason Powers – recording engineer (2, 10)
- Alberto Sosa – assistant recording engineer (1, 3–9)
- Alejandro Solis – assistant recording engineer (1, 3–9)
- Mauricio Acuña – assistant recording engineer (1, 3–9)
- Anna White – cover art
- Daniel Castrejón – design
