= Mississippi Records =

American record store and label

Coordinates: 45°33′38.0″N 122°40′29.2″W

General information
- Type: Shop
- Location: Portland, Oregon, U.S.

Website
- www.mississippirecords.net

Mississippi Records is a record store and label. It was founded by Eric Isaacson in 2003 in Portland, Oregon. It also houses a café, equipment repair shop, and the Portland Museum of Modern Art.

== Brick and mortar store ==
The name Mississippi Records originates from Isaacson's original store location on Mississippi Ave, Portland, Oregon. Isaacson worked previously as a manager at Oakland's now-defunct Saturn Records.

== History of record label ==
For many years Isaacson ran Mississippi Records from Portland with co-founder/co-owner Warren Hill. Isaacson is historically taciturn about speaking on Mississippi's background: "I haven't really found a way of finding great joy in sharing this information because the records are a better messenger for my ideas than anything I could say and a lot of times when you talk about stuff it just loses a lot of its power."

Mississippi Records co-founder Warren Hill has cited The Origin Jazz Library, Smithsonian Folkways, Arhoolie Records, Sublime Frequencies, and Herwin as sources of inspiration for Mississippi Records compilations.

Warren Hill formed his own record label Little Axe Records in 2011, also based in Portland, "when the original Mississippi Records label split."

On January 1, 2019, filmmaker Cyrus Moussavi and musician Gordon Ashworth became the new owners with Isaacson working as a label project manager. Mississippi Records relocated to Chicago. In 2019, Mississippi Records went on a national tour.

=== Mississippi Records Tape Series ===
The Mississippi Records Tape Series is an ongoing open-edition mix tape project. Mississippi Records store employee Karen Antunes originally suggested the idea for a low-price mix tape to Eric Isaacson, with the first tape appearing in 2005.

== Reception ==
The business placed second in the Best Record Store category of Willamette Week's annual 'Best of Portland' readers' poll in 2025.
