= Yasmin Williams =

American finger-style guitarist

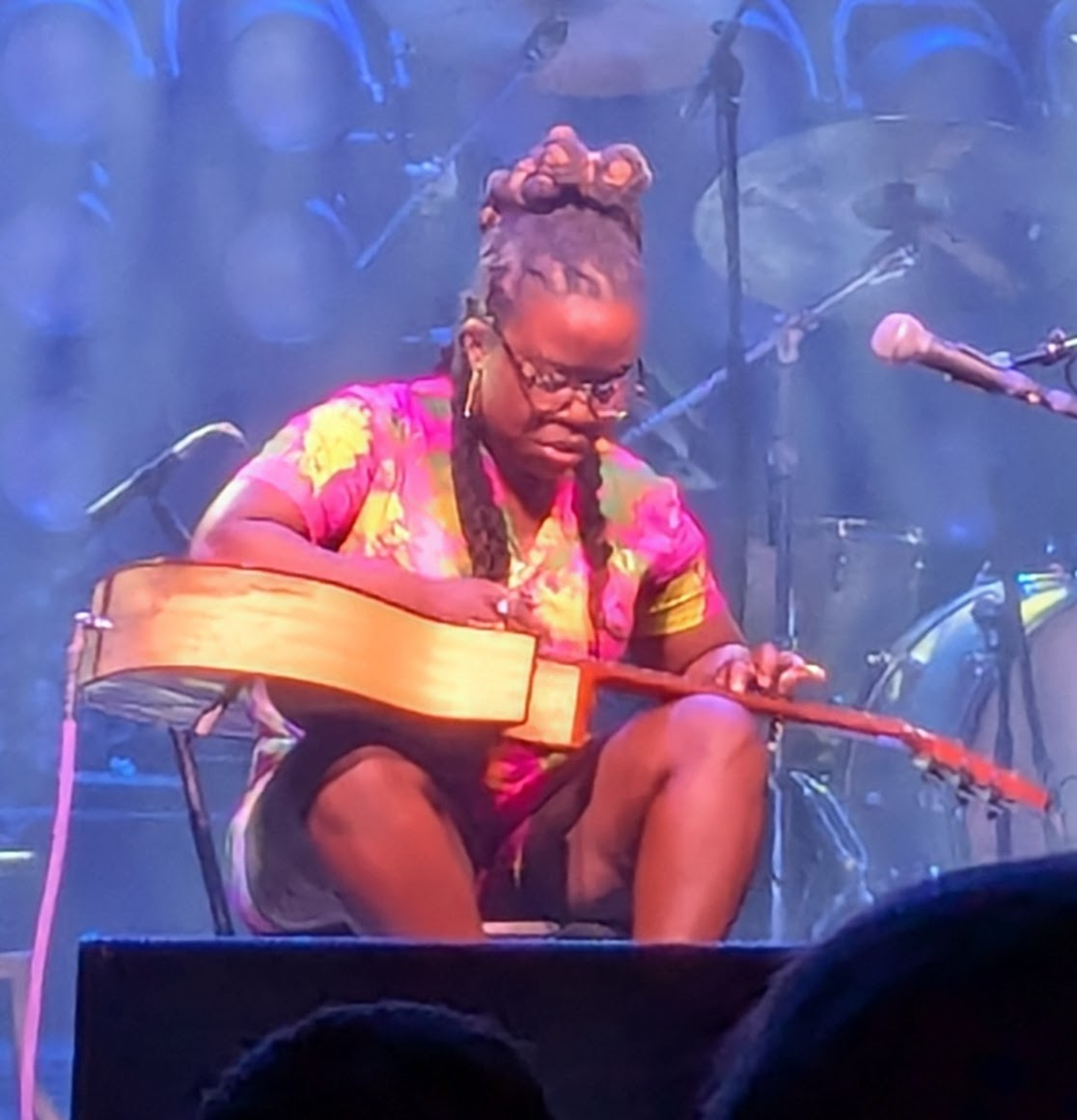

Background information
- Born: Virginia, United States
- Genres: Contemporary folk; instrumental; country
- Instruments: acoustic guitar; harp guitar; kalimba; kora
- Years active: 2012–present
- Labels: Spinster; Nonesuch
- Website: www.yasminwilliamsmusic.com

Yasmin Williams (born May 31, 1997) is an American composer and fingerstyle guitarist from Northern Virginia. She plays several instruments including the kalimba, harp guitar, and guitar with the strings facing up while on her lap.

== Early life and education ==
Williams grew up in the town of Woodbridge in Northern Virginia. In December 2017, she graduated from New York University with a degree in music theory and composition.

== Musical career ==
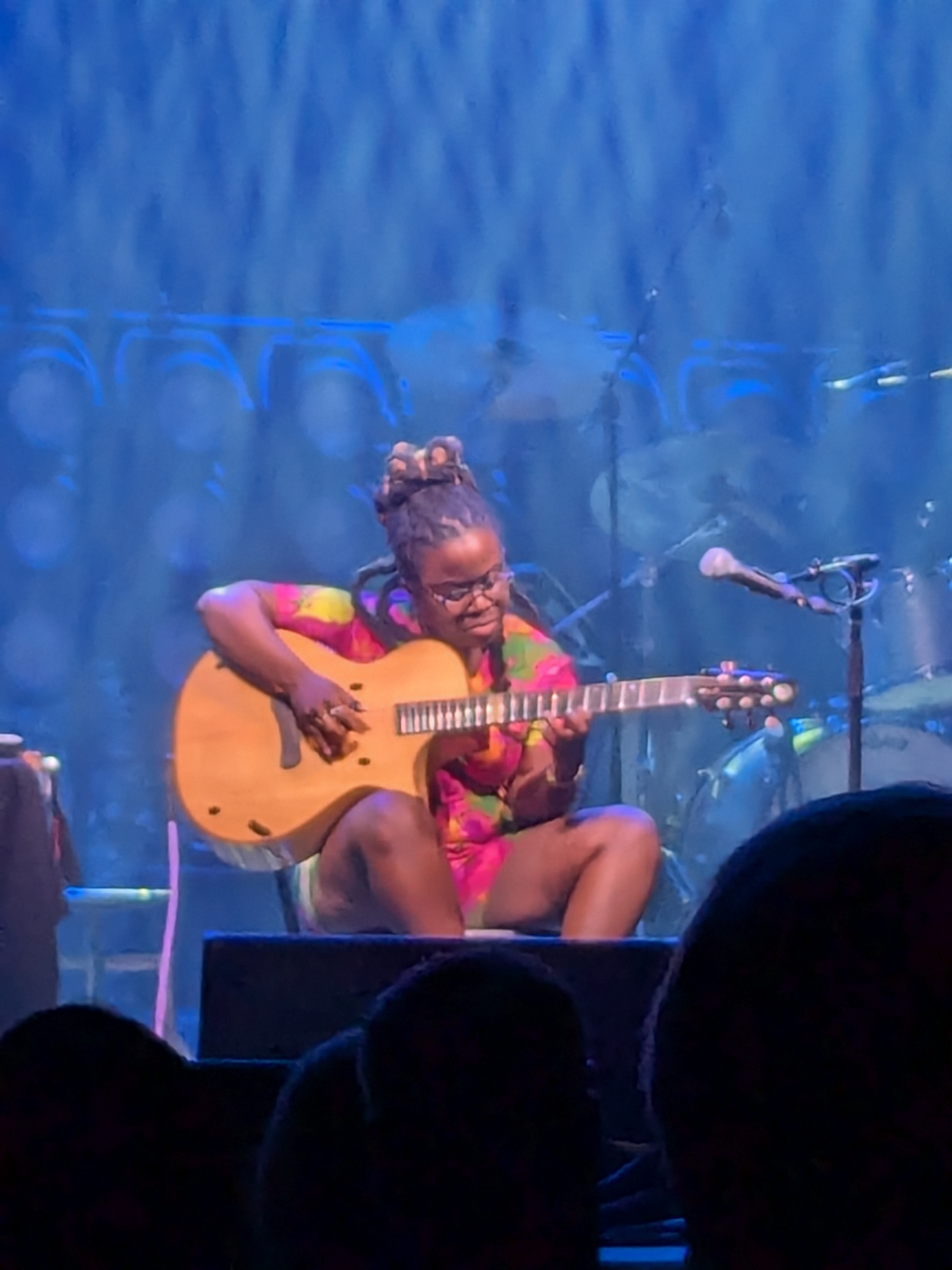
Yasmin Williams performing in September 2024 at the Roadrunner.

=== 2009–2012: Beginnings and Serendipity ===
Williams became inspired to start learning guitar on her own after playing Guitar Hero II. After being gifted her first electric guitar and amplifier, Williams practiced by ear until the release of her first EP Serendipity in 2012, when she was a teenager. The project's production and recording were entirely handled by Williams herself. From there Williams also became proficient in bass, twelve-string guitar, and classical guitar, before deciding to adopt the acoustic guitar as her primary instrument.

=== 2018–2020: Unwind ===
She later developed her style of playing by setting the guitar face-up on her lap, tuning the strings to a specific harmony, then finger picking to play. She also includes other elements such as two handed lap-tapping for added rhythm in her mainly instrumental compositions. Pitchfork described her musical approach: "Williams’ inventive style, which has also involved wearing tap shoes and taking a cello bow to her instrument, has made her stand out in the field of solo guitarists." Rolling Stone describe her songs as "textured, harmonious soundscapes."

In 2018, Willams independently released her first studio album, Unwind. The album honed her signature finger-style technique, and also utilized non-Western instruments such as the kalimba. The album features the composition "New Beginnings", which she wrote in high school.

=== 2020-2024: Urban Driftwood and Acadia ===
Williams's second studio album, Urban Driftwood, released in 2021 through Spinster Records, was written in 2020 during the COVID-19 lockdown and was influenced by the Black Lives Matter protests during that summer.

In 2024, she released her third studio album, Acadia, through Nonesuch Records. The album entered the UK Album Downloads Chart, peaking at #100, and the UK Americana Chart, peaking at #39.

=== 2025 ===
In April 2025, Williams emailed Richard Grenell, interim executive director of the Kennedy Center, expressing concern about DEI rollbacks and other changes made by President Donald Trump. She stated, "These events have caused a major negative reaction in my musical community to playing at the Kennedy Center, with lots of individuals I know ultimately canceling their shows there". In his reply, Grenell stated, "Every single person who cancelled a show did so because they couldn’t be in the presence of Republicans," and "I cut the DEI bullshit because we can’t afford to pay people for fringe and niche programming that the public won’t support". In September 2025, Grenell's office reserved seats for a group of Log Cabin Republicans who organized a disruption of Williams's performance at the center.

== Discography ==
=== Albums ===
- Unwind (self-released, 2018)
- Urban Driftwood (Spinster, 2021)
- Acadia (Nonesuch, 2024)

=== Soundtrack Albums ===
- Saving Etting Street (original film score) (self-released, 2026)

=== EPs ===
- Serendipity (self-released, 2012)

=== Singles ===
- I Wonder (2018)
- Take That Step (2019) (featuring Jason Bembry)
- Dragonfly (2020)
- Nova to be (2022) (with Dobrotto)
- Doc's Guitar (2023)
- Dawning (2023) (featuring Aoife O'Donovan, Kafari & Nic Gareiss)
- Virga (2024) (featuring Darlingside)
- Hummingbird (2024) (featuring Allison de Groot & Tatiana Hargreaves)
