= William Tyler (musician) =

American musician and guitarist (born 1979)

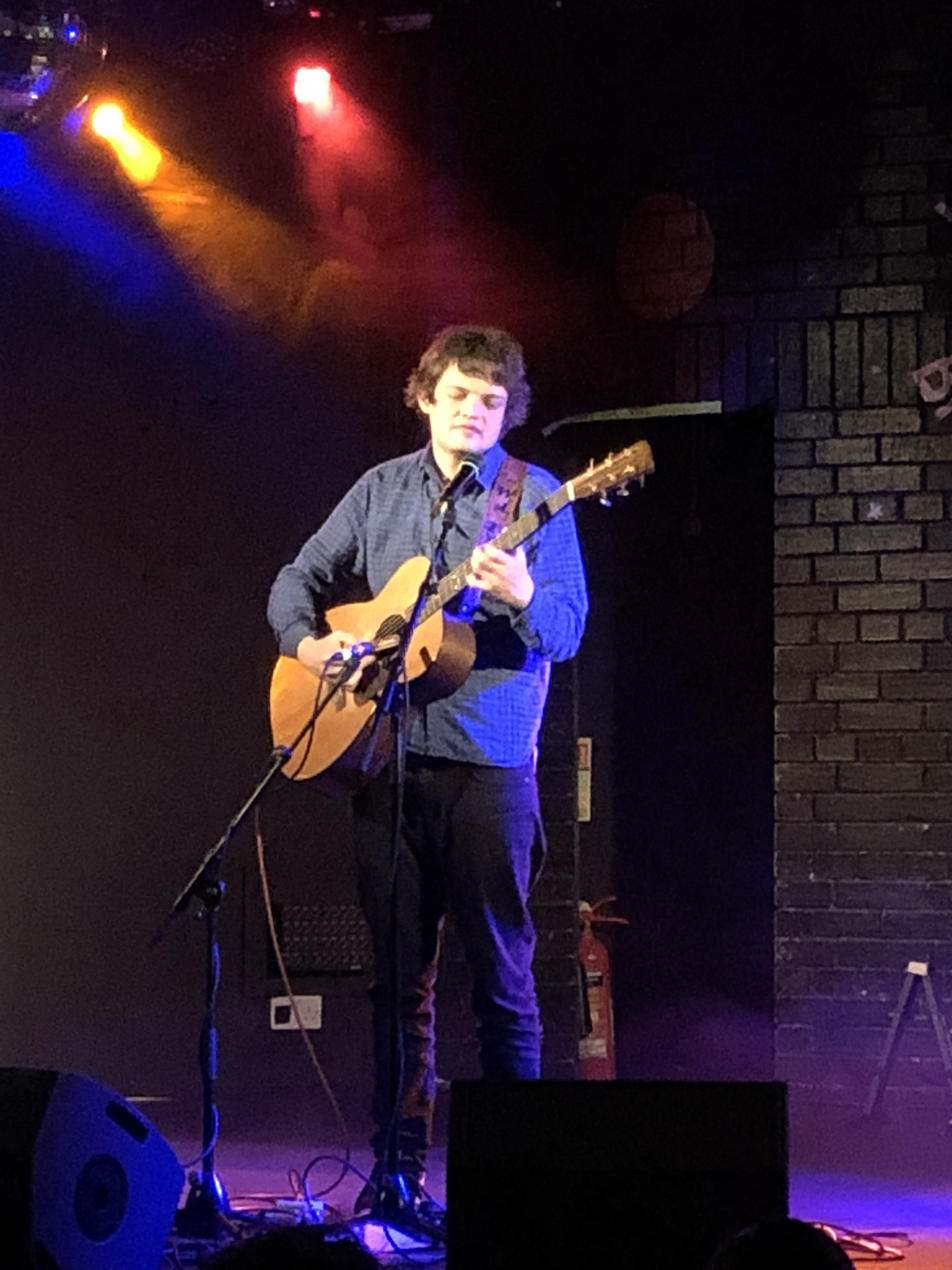
- William Tyler performing at Brudenell Social Club, Leeds, UK in 2019

Background information
- Born: William Armistead Tyler; December 25, 1979 (age 46); Nashville, Tennessee, U.S.
- Genres: Folk, indie folk, pop rock
- Occupation: Musician
- Instrument: Guitar
- Years active: 1998–present
- Labels: Merge, Tompkins Square, Third Man
- Formerly of: Lambchop, Silver Jews
- Website: www.williamtyler.net

William Armistead Tyler (born December 25, 1979, in Nashville, Tennessee) is an American guitarist and composer who plays "cosmic country," folk, indie folk, and pop rock.

He was a member of the band Lambchop from 1998 to 2010 and the band Silver Jews from 2001 to 2009, along with the band superdrag, from 2000 to 2003. His debut solo studio album, Behold the Spirit, was released on November 22, 2010. Adam Bednarik produced the album with Tyler on Tompkins Square Records. He has since released three additional solo albums.

== Background ==
Tyler was born to Daniel E. "Dan" Tyler and Adele B. Tyler on December 25, 1979, in Nashville, Tennessee. His father is a noted songwriter in his own right who wrote "The Light in Your Eyes" for LeAnn Rimes, co-wrote "Baby's Got a New Baby" for S-K-O, and co-wrote "Modern Day Romance" for the Nitty Gritty Dirt Band. In addition, both of his parents co-wrote "Bobbie Sue" for The Oak Ridge Boys. Tyler has a younger sister named Elise. William and Elise Tyler were the owners and founders of The Stone Fox in Nashville, Tennessee, which was a music restaurant/café/bar that opened on September 20, 2012 and held its final live show on January 31, 2016. William is a 1998 graduate and his sister Elise is a 2002 graduate of University School of Nashville.

== Music ==
Before he became a solo artist, Tyler was a member of Lambchop and Silver Jews beginning in 1998. Tyler first joined Lambchop at the age of 19 because Kurt Wagner approached him about playing the organ in the band. However, it turned out that he got to play guitar because he admittedly said "I couldn't really play" the organ. Before releasing music under his own name, Tyler used The Paper Hats as working title for his solo music. In 2010, Tyler released a universally acclaimed album entitled Behold the Spirit, and in 2013 released another critically acclaimed album entitled Impossible Truth. This was followed by his third full length, Modern Country, which was hailed by Rolling Stone magazine as one of the "best country albums of 2016". In April 2025, he released his fourth full length, Time Indefinite, on Psychic Hotline. He collaborated with London based electronic music producer Four Tet (Kieran Hebden + William Tyler) to release the album 41 Longfield Street Late ‘80s released on 19 September 2025.

=== As producer ===
In 2015, Tyler produced the debut album for Jake Xerxes Fussell. Tyler was also one of two co-producers on the track "Survivor" from Mary J. Blige's 2017 album Strength of a Woman.

In 2019, Tyler provided music for Kelly Reichardt’s film First Cow and officially released the music as a soundtrack album the following year.

== Discography ==
Year	Album details	Peak chart positions							
Year	Album details	US (Note: All of the US peak positions listed here is from Billboard's Top Album Sales, not the actual Billboard 200.)	US Folk	US Heat	US Indie	US Rock (Note: All of the US rock peak positions listed here are from the Rock Album Sales chart, a component chart of the actual Top Rock Albums chart.)	UK Ameri cana	UK Coun try	UK Indie
2010	Behold the Spirit: Released: November 22, 2010; Label: Tompkins Square; Format: CD, digital download	—	—	—	—	—	—	—	—
2013	Impossible Truth: Released: March 19, 2013; Label: Merge; Format: CD, 2×LP, digital download	—	—	—	—	—	—	—	—
2016	Modern Country: Released: June 3, 2016; Label: Merge; Format: CD, 2×LP, digital download	—	13	8	44	—	—	—	—
2019	Goes West: Released: January 25, 2019; Label: Merge; Format: CD, LP, digital download	82	(Note: Goes West never entered Billboard's official Americana/Folk Albums chart but reached number seven on its sales component chart.)	5	9	22	7	2	47
2020	Music From First Cow: Released: March 6, 2020, as soundtrack for First Cow; Label: Merge; Format: LP, digital download	—	—	—	—	—	—	—	—
2021	Lost Futures (with Marisa Anderson): Released: August 27, 2021; Label: Thrill Jockey; Format: LP, CD, digital download, streaming	—	—	—	—	—	—	—	—
2025	Time Indefinite: Released: April 25, 2025; Label: Psychic Hotline; Format: LP, CD, digital download, streaming	—	—	—	—	—	—	—	—

=== EPs ===
- New Vanitas (2020)
- Understand (2021) (with Luke Schneider)
