= Requinto guitar =

Type of small classical guitar

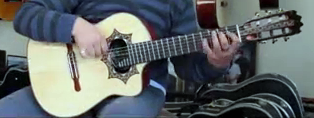
Someone playing a requinto.

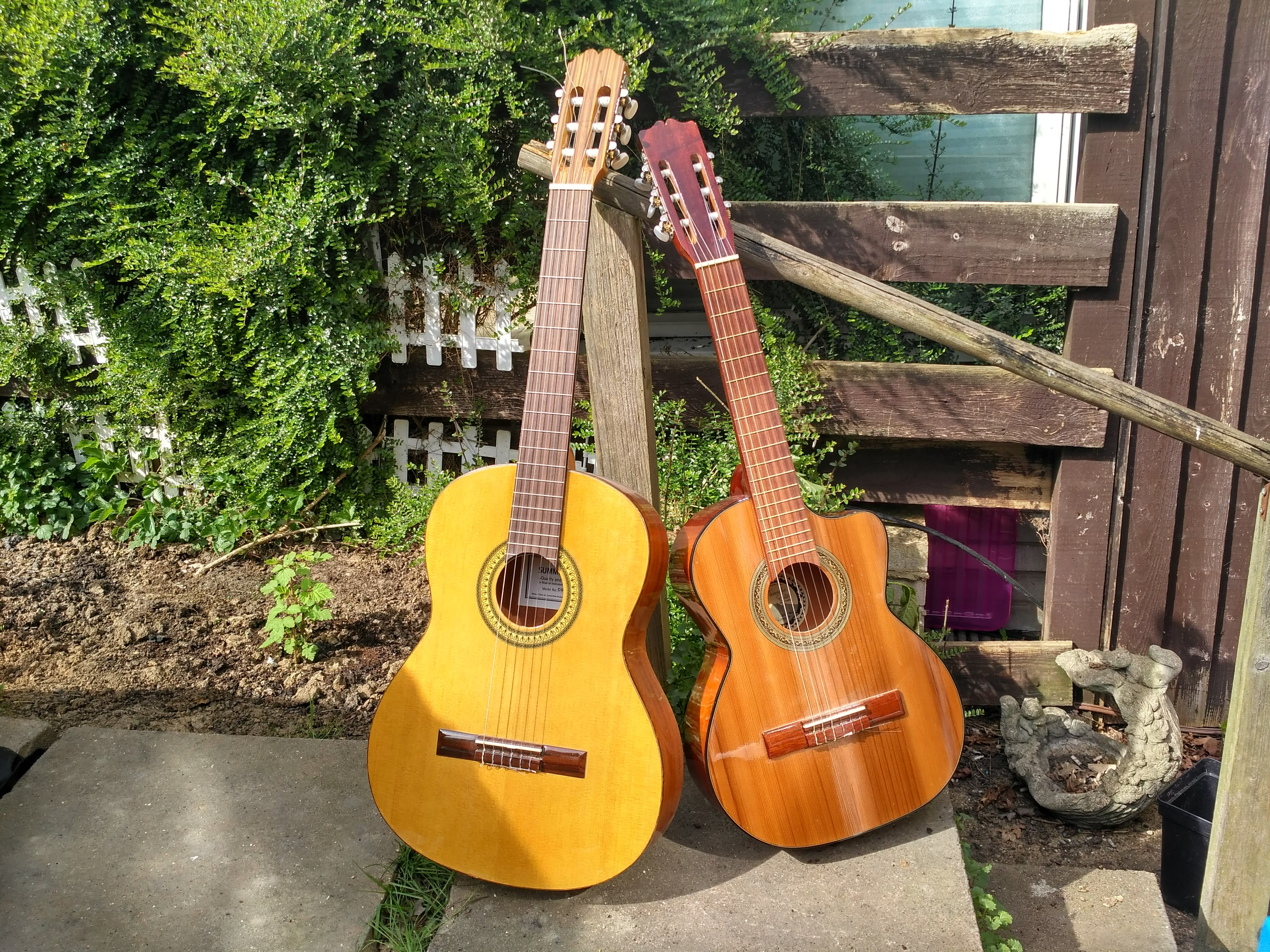
A classical guitar (left) and a requinto guitar (right)

A requinto guitar, also known as Quarte guitar, is a smaller version of a classical guitar, with a scale length between 52-54cm. It is tuned a fourth higher than a standard classical guitar, to A2-D3-G3-C4-E4-A4. They often, but not always, have a cutout to reach the higher frets.

== Use ==
Its creation is attributed to Alfredo Bojalil Gil (El Güero Gil), from Puebla, Mexico, who was the third voice and requintist of the iconic trio Los Panchos. The requinto is used in songs of the Mexican culture like boleros and corridos, and in Latin America, where the requinto plays a very big role in popular music. In Mexico it is used in trío romántico groups.

The requinto guitar is traditionally used in guitar orchestras, along with other sized guitars.

Requintos made in Mexico have a deeper body than a standard classical guitar (110 millimetres [4 1/3 in] as opposed to 105 millimetres [4 1/8 in]). Requintos made in Spain tend to be of the same depth as the standard classical.

== See also ==
- Media related to Requinto guitars at Wikimedia Commons
- Guitalele - A similar ukulele-guitar hybrid with the same tuning but a much smaller body.
