= BBC Radio Scotland late-night schedule changes (2025–2026) =

BBC Radio Scotland changes (2025–2026)

BBC Radio Scotland late-night music programming controversy (2025–2026) refers to the public and industry response to changes to BBC Radio Scotland’s late-night music schedule, announced in late 2025 and introduced from Januar y 2026. The changes replaced several curator-led late-night programmes with the weekday strand Up Late, and introduced new weekend programmes, including Roddy Hart’s Mix Tape. Many musicians, industry organisations, and the Scottish Government expressed concern that the changes would limit opportunities for music discovery and career development for Scottish artists. BBC Scotland stated that it remained committed to specialist music and supporting Scottish talent across its schedule.

== Background ==
In November 2025, The Herald reported that BBC Radio Scotland would wind up several established late-night music programmes as part of a strategy intended to give late-night output “broad mainstream appeal”. The report described a commissioning brief seeking proposals for a new late-night show featuring “more mainstream, easy listening tracks” aimed at audiences aged 45 and over, and framed as a “late-night companion to wind down the day” with “intelligent speech between the tracks”.

The planned changes drew criticism from musicians and industry bodies who said the programmes provided an important platform for new Scottish music and independent artists, and that the replacement format risked homogenising output.

== Programming changes ==
=== Up Late ===
BBC Radio Scotland launched Up Late as a weekday strand, published as a programme brand on BBC Sounds. In later reporting, The Herald described Up Late as a “playlist-led programme” replacing “curator-led specialist shows” which previously aired between 10pm and midnight, Monday to Thursday. Fridays kept Ashley Storrie but now as part of Up Late rather than the Ashley Storrie Show.

BBC Scotland addressed the changes via its public complaints process page. Luke McCullough, Corporate Affairs Director for the BBC in Scotland, wrote a letter to The Scotsman, stating that the replacement programmes "continue BBC Radio Scotland’s commitment to showcase the best from Scotland’s music industry and beyond, including unsigned bands".

=== Weekend output and Roddy Hart's Mix Tape ===
Weekend late-night output was branded with the Roddy Hart's Mix Tape programmes, published as a BBC Sounds brand. BBC Media Centre published schedule notes for the revised late-night weekend output.

== Presenters and discontinued programmes ==
The Herald reported that late-night programmes associated with Billy Sloan, Iain Anderson, Natasha Raskin Sharp and Roddy Hart would be ended or replaced in the overhaul.

In November 2025, musicians quoted by The Herald criticised the decision. Singer Iona Fyfe said ending Anderson’s show “equates to cultural vandalism”. Emma Pollock described the loss of multiple programmes as “absolutely devastating” and “short-sighted”.

Billy Sloan criticised the direction of the changes, writing that he did not play “the hits” and preferred “alternative tracks they wouldn’t normally expect”.

== Open letters and public criticism ==
=== Artist open letter ===
In December 2025, musicians and creative industry bodies issued an open letter calling for BBC Radio Scotland to pause the programme changes and consult with the sector.

Both The Guardian and NME reported that the letter was organised by Stephen McAll of the band Constant Follower. The Guardian described the dispute as centred on the loss of “career-igniting” opportunities for emerging Scottish artists.

The letter argued that presenter-led late-night programmes play a specific role in discovery and career development. It stated that “a trusted presenter” playing a track on national radio can open “industry doors”. It claimed that a playlist could not replace the functions of presenter-led shows, stating: “A playlist doesn’t give you an enthusiastic and globally respected quote”. The letter concluded: “These are the trusted voices of our late-night radio. We do not want to lose them.”

=== Scottish Music Industry Association open letter ===
The Scottish Music Industry Association (SMIA) published an open letter urging BBC Radio Scotland to pause the changes and undertake consultation, framing the issue as a public service remit concern. The Herald reported SMIA warning that the removal of “culturally significant” shows would create “a significant gap” and risk Scotland’s creative identity being “diluted through homogenised programming”.

=== Musicians’ Union statement ===
The Musicians’ Union criticised the plans. Caroline Sewell, regional organiser for Scotland and Northern Ireland, said: “We urge BBC Scotland to reconsider”.

=== Music Sector Organisations open letter ===
On 5 March 2026, Complete Music Update reported on a SMIA-led open letter to BBC Radio Scotland, co-signed by music sector organisations from Scotland and the wider UK. The letter called for consultation with Scotland's music sector and audiences, a published strategy setting out how BBC Radio Scotland would meet its public service obligations to support Scottish music discovery and development, and clarification of the commissioning rationale and editorial framework for late-night music output. SMIA said the letter was supported by organisations including AIM, BPI, the Featured Artists Coalition, Help Musicians, the Music Managers Forum, the Musicians' Union, Music Venue Trust. PRS Foundation, Scottish Music Centre, The Ivors Academy, the Traditional Music Forum of Scotland and UK Music.

== Coverage and commentary ==
The controversy was reported in UK media including The Guardian and NME, and was extensively covered by The Herald in relation to the schedule change, responses from musicians and industry bodies, and subsequent debate over the impact of the new output.

In December 2025, The Herald reported McAll accusing BBC management of “sleight of hand” in its handling of the controversy and in how internal commissioning language contrasted with external messaging about its remit and commitments.

In June, Jude Rogers, writing in The Observer's radio review column, criticised the wider BBC Radio Scotland schedule changes, describing the loss of specialist presenters and the move towards playlist-led programming as a "big turn-off". Rogers wrote that "Up Late" lacked the more unusual selections associated with Billy Sloan's former programme, and argued that BBC evening shows should "inform and educate as they entertain".

== Research submission to the CEEAC Committee ==
In January 2026, The Herald reported on research comparing BBC Radio Scotland late-night playlists from 1 to 15 January 2026 with the same period in 2025, which it said demonstrated a substantial decline in the amount of new music and new Scottish music played, particularly for artists not on major labels; showing a 67% decline in plays of new tracks by non-major label Scottish artists in the first two full weeks of the new schedule. The Herald stated that the research was conducted by Constant Follower, led by Stephen McAll, and that the findings were submitted to the Scottish Parliament’s Constitution, Europe, External Affairs and Culture Committee (CEEAC).

The published CEEAC submission was made available separately.

== Meeting of the Constitution, Europe, External Affairs and Culture Committee 22 January 2026 ==
Following the announcement and implementation of BBC Radio Scotland’s late night schedule changes, the issue was discussed during a session of the Scottish Parliament’s Constitution, Europe, External Affairs and Culture (CEEAC) Committee as part of its work on Scottish broadcasting.

=== CEEAC Scrutiny and written evidence ===
During the session, Patrick Harvie MSP questioned BBC Scotland Director Hayley Valentine on whether the changes reduced an established platform for emerging artists, describing late night output as being “about giving emerging artists a platform and the opportunity to be found and to be heard”. Valentine said that public criticism of the changes had been driven by “misinformation” during the period between the announcement and launch, describing this as including claims that BBC Scotland was “pulling away from the Scottish music sector”, “not supporting Scottish artists and new artists”, and “moving to an automated playlist”.

Public criticism included a comparative analysis submitted to the Committee by Stephen McAll (Constant Follower), described in reporting as a comparison of BBC published late night playlists for 1–15 January 2026 (new schedule) against 1–15 January 2025 (old schedule). In evidence to the Committee, Valentine said BBC Scotland had conducted its own internal comparison and found “no change”, stating that between the last week of the old schedule in December and the first two weeks of the new schedule, “the number of Scottish artists and the number of new Scottish artists have remained broadly the same”.

BBC Corporate Affairs Director Luke McCullough told the Committee there had been “a slight mischaracterisation of what was on air before”, using Natasha Raskin Sharp’s final show as an example and stating that he had listened to it. He listed international catalogue artists played within it (including Billie Holiday, Nina Simone, Crosby, Stills & Nash and the Ramones) and said “that is not new and emerging Scottish talent.” The BBC programme guide description for the final show states: “Natasha bows out with her usual eclectic mix of music from across the eras and genres.”

Written submissions to the Committee also raised concerns about the effect of the schedule changes on new Scottish music and emerging artists. Professor Nick Higgins, Director of the Creative Media Academy and Professor of Media Practice at the University of the West of Scotland, wrote that “Emerging artists, in particular, may face even greater challenges in breaking through in an increasingly crowded and algorithm-driven media environment, with far less opportunity to be heard on national airwaves.” The Glasgow band The Tenementals described the changes as “a further retreat from having an engaged and active community of radio and music practitioners”, argued that diminishing new music is “a step in the wrong direction”, and noted that community media provides more extensive space to showcase grassroots Scottish music in Scotland.

== CEEAC Scottish Broadcasting Report ==
In March 2026, the Scottish Parliament's CEEAC Committee published its Scottish Broadcasting report. It said it was "not convinced" by BBC Scotland's response to concerns about the effect of programming changes on Scottish artists, and asked BBC Scotland to share the basis of its internal monitoring of Scottish artists in the new night-time schedule and across daytime output.

== BBC response ==
BBC Radio Scotland stated that it was “not unusual for radio stations to undergo changes” in a competitive market and that it continued to listen to audience feedback and evolve its offer. It said it “remains proud to showcase the full breadth of Scotland’s musical talent” and that “specialist music remains a cornerstone” of its music policy.

BBC Radio Scotland stated that “the existing programmes are ending after a procurement process” in which the incumbent independent production companies “did not bid for the work”, while open letter organisers argued that the tender requested a substantially different “easy-listening” style of show, pointing to the BBC's Invitation To Tender for the new Up Late show which describes a single show over five nights rather than several individually curated shows.

In response to the January 2026 research based on the BBC late-night playlists reported by The Herald and The Sunday Times, BBC Scotland said it did not "recognise these figures which appear to be drawn from a very limited view" of their station-wide "music offering", stating that its own analysis showed the number of Scottish tracks before and after changes was “broadly the same”.

== Monitoring project ==
In May 2026, The Guardian reported that the culturalvandalism.info monitoring project set up by Stephen McAll had calculated declines in Scottish independent artists and female or female-led emerging Scottish artists played between January and May 2026 compared with the same period in 2025. BBC Radio Scotland disputed the interpretation, saying its own analysis found the number of songs from Scottish artists before and after the late-night changes was "broadly the same".

In June 2026, The Herald reported that McAll had compiled airplay data from 1 January 2026. The report said figures published at culturalvandalism.info showed 57% fewer emerging Scottish artists and 29% fewer Scottish independent artists played compared with the same period in 2025. The Herald said the findings challenged BBC Scotland's earlier position that the overall volume of Scottish music on the station was "broadly the same" after the schedule changes.

== Notable reactions ==
In December 2025, Simple Minds singer Jim Kerr criticised the end of Billy Sloan’s programme. The Herald reported Kerr describing the decision as a “spectacular own goal”.

The Guardian quoted musician James Yorkston criticising the shift toward easy listening, saying there were already “plenty of places to hear it”, and that “things have a value beyond listening figures”.

== See also ==
- BBC Radio Scotland
- BBC Sounds
- Public service broadcasting in the United Kingdom
- Music of Scotland
