= Even Days Dissolve =

2023 collaborative studio album by Scott William Urquhart and Constant Follower

Studio album by Scott William Urquhart & Constant Follower
- Released: 14 April 2023
- Recorded: 2022–2023
- Studio: Hum of Gold, Stirling
- Genre: Folk
- Label: Golden Hum Recordings
- Producer: Stephen McAll

Even Days Dissolve is a collaborative studio album by Scottish guitarist Scott William Urquhart and the Stirling-based experimental folk project Constant Follower, led by songwriter and producer Stephen McAll. It was released on 14 April 2023 through Golden Hum Recordings. The album was nominated for the 2023 Scottish Album of the Year Award (SAY Award).

== Background and recording ==
Fingerstyle guitarist Scott William Urquhart and Constant Follower's Stephen McAll met in Stirling, where they both live. Under the Radar reported that the collaboration brought together Urquhart's guitar work with McAll's songwriting and production. McAll told interviewers that Urquhart is someone he had admired for some time, placing him amongst Scotland's best acoustic guitarists; and described the writing process for the first song as beginning with the recording of Urquhart's guitar, followed by McAll's instrumentation and words.

Even Days Dissolve was recorded and mixed at McAll's Hum of Gold studio in Stirling, and mastered by Mark Kramer (known professionally as Kramer) at Noise, Miami.

== Artwork and design ==
The album artwork is credited to Scottish-Japanese artist Kanae Park, with design by Timothy O’Donnell. Park's commissions include designing an album cover for Constant Follower, as noted in her biography on the Society of Scottish Artists website.

== Composition and content ==
The album features several guest appearances including jazz musician Matt Carmichael, harp player Andy Aquarius, Mark Tranmer (GNAC, The Montgolfier Brothers) and Scottish hip hop artist CRPNTR. Two songs feature recordings of Scottish poet Norman MacCaig, whom McAll cites as a primary influence on his writing. In an interview for Various Small Flames about the album, McAll stated that working with MacCaig's poetry readings was a highlight of the project and questioned whether any poet or songwriter has matched MacCaig's ability to capture the space and wonder of the natural beauty of Scotland.

== Critical reception ==
The album received positive reviews on release. The Scotsman awarded four stars and described it as a "self-soothing suite of tranquil beauty". KLOF Mag described the album as an understated and textured listen, commenting on the relationship between sound, language, and the Scottish landscape. A Pessimist Is Never Disappointed, called it a "quiet masterpiece". The album was nominated for the 2023 Scottish Album of the Year Award (SAY Award).

== Track listing ==
Track listing per Apple Music.

1. "Waves Crash Here"
2. "Wildlife Cameraman (Summer Farm)"
3. "Watching The Black River Run"
4. "Song For A Willow Tree"
5. "Space Between Stars"
6. "Even Days Dissolve"
7. "Ash Wednesday Slow"
8. "Comes A Silence (Basking Shark)"

== Personnel ==
Credits per the album's liner notes.

- Stephen McAll – vocals; guitars; bass; synthesisers; keyboards; recording; mixing; production
- Scott William Urquhart – vocals; acoustic guitar
- Norman MacCaig – spoken word (tracks 2 and 8)
- Andrew Pankhurst – electric guitar (tracks 2, 4 and 7)
- Kathleen Stosch – vocals (tracks 2, 4 and 6)
- Amy Campbell – vocals (track 3)
- David Guild – bass (tracks 2, 4 and 6)
- Gareth Perrie – piano (track 2)

Additional musicians

- Mark Tranmer – piano (track 3); brass (track 2); bass (track 1)
- Andy Aquarius – harp (track 8)
- Matt Carmichael – saxophone (track 8)
- CRPNTR – vocals (track 7)
- Tom Hutchison – electric guitar (track 3)
- Islay McAll – vocals (track 2)
- Kenny Bates – electric guitar (track 6)
- Martin J. Pickering – vocals (track 5)
- The Mytholmroyd Colliery Band – brass (track 2)

Production

- Stephen McAll – recording, mixing and production (Hum of Gold, Stirling)
- Kramer – mastering (Noise, Miami)

== Singles ==
- "Waves Crash Here"
- "Watching The Black River Run"
- "Wildlife Cameraman (Summer Farm)"
- "Space Between Stars"

== Accolades ==
- Scottish Album of the Year (SAY) Award: longlisted (2023).
