= PRS Foundation =

- The Performing Right Society Foundation
- Abbreviation: PRSF
- Formation: 2000
- Founder: PRS for Music
- Type: Registered charity
- Legal status: Active
- Purpose: Music funding and talent development
- Headquarters: London, England
- Region served: United Kingdom
- Chief Executive Officer: Joe Frankland
- Chair: Simon Platz
- Parent organization: Independent (primary funder: PRS for Music)
- Affiliations: PPL, Arts Council England, Creative Europe
- Budget: £3–4 million annually
- Website: prsfoundation.com

PRS Foundation (The Performing Right Society Foundation) is the United Kingdom's leading charitable funder of new music and talent development. Established in 2000 by PRS for Music, the Foundation supports songwriters, composers, artists and music organisations across all genres through grant funding, professional development programmes and strategic initiatives addressing systemic barriers in the music industry.

Since its inception, PRS Foundation has invested over £50 million in more than 9,000 new music initiatives. The Foundation has supported seven of the last eight Mercury Prize winners and numerous BRIT, Ivors, RPS and Grammy award winners and nominees.

== History ==
=== Foundation and early years ===
PRS Foundation was established in 2000 by PRS for Music, the UK's collecting society for songwriters, composers and music publishers. The Foundation was created in recognition that despite the abundance of talented music creators in the UK, many needed support to create new music and reach new audiences.

The organisation is formally registered as a charity and operates independently from PRS for Music, although it receives its core funding from the parent organisation. PRS for Music's grants to PRS Foundation are primarily funded from non-licensing revenues, most notably from interest earned on royalties awaiting distribution.

=== Leadership ===
The Foundation's first chief executive was Vanessa Reed, who served for 11 years from 2008 to 2019. During Reed's tenure, the Foundation tripled its resources for organisations, composers, songwriters and artists, introducing programmes including the Momentum Music Fund (2013), New Music Biennial (2012), and Women Make Music. Under her leadership, PRS Foundation awarded over £26 million to more than 4,100 new music initiatives.

Reed also founded Keychange, a pioneering international gender equality initiative, in 2017. She departed in 2019 to become president and CEO of New Music USA.

== Funding programmes ==
PRS Foundation operates multiple funding schemes supporting music creators at different career stages and addressing specific needs within the industry.

=== The Open Fund ===
The Open Fund comprises two streams:

- The Open Fund for Music Creators offers grants of up to £5,000 to individual songwriters, composers, artists, bands and performers for projects involving the creation, performance and promotion of new music.
- The Open Fund for Organisations provides grants up to £10,000 to UK-based not-for-profit organisations including festivals, venues, promoters, orchestras and talent development organisations.

=== Women Make Music ===
Launched in 2011, Women Make Music is the Foundation's flagship gender equity initiative supporting the development of outstanding women, trans and non-binary songwriters and composers across all genres and career stages.

The fund was established in response to low representation of women amongst PRS for Music members (13% in 2011) and low application rates from women for commissions (16%). Grants of up to £5,000 are available for projects involving creation, performance and promotion of new music.

By 2023, Women Make Music had invested over £1.46 million in more than 380 women and gender expansive music creators. However, demand increased by 340% since 2011, meaning only 8% of applicants could be supported. Notable grantees include Anna Meredith, ESKA, Emma-Jean Thackray, Carleen Anderson, Cassie Kinoshi, Let's Eat Grandma, Jessica Curry, Judith Weir, Kelly Lee Owens, Little Boots, Errollyn Wallen, Marika Hackman, Poppy Ajudha and YolanDa Brown.

=== PPL Momentum Music Fund ===
Created in partnership with PPL and Arts Council England in 2013, the Momentum Music Fund supports artists at a breakthrough stage of their careers.

=== The Composers' Fund ===
The Composers' Fund offers contributions up to £10,000 to composers with a strong track record who are making a significant cultural contribution in the UK and have potential for greater impact domestically and internationally. The fund provides direct access to funding at pivotal career stages for established composers.

=== International Showcase Fund ===
The International Showcase Fund supports UK-based music creators who have been invited to perform or showcase their work internationally. The fund helps offset costs associated with international touring, particularly addressing increased expenses caused by Brexit and visa requirements.

=== Talent Development Network ===
The Talent Development Network (TDN) provides grants of up to £25,000 per year for up to three years to music creator development organisations in the UK including venues, festivals, promoters and other specialists. The programme is funded by PRS for Music and PPL, supporting 70+ organisations per year.

=== Other programmes ===
Additional programmes include:

- New Music Biennial: Festival weekends of commissioned new music in partnership with UK Cities of Culture
- Beyond Borders: UK commissioning programme
- Musicians in Residence: International residency programmes, including partnerships with the British Council

== Strategic initiatives ==
=== Keychange ===
Keychange is an international initiative co-founded by PRS Foundation in 2017 (launched at Reeperbahn Festival) with partners including Reeperbahn Festival (Germany) and Musikcentrum Öst (Sweden).

The initiative addresses gender imbalance in the music industry through two main components:

- The Keychange Pledge: A commitment by festivals, music organisations and companies to achieve or maintain at least 50:50 gender balance in their programming, staffing and beyond by 2022. Over 750 organisations worldwide have signed the pledge.
- Keychange Talent Development Programme: An annual programme supporting 74 emerging women and gender-diverse artists and innovators from participating countries through international festivals, showcase events, creative labs and professional development opportunities.

The programme is supported by the European Union's Creative Europe programme and has expanded to the United States (launched June 2022 with founding sponsors TuneCore and Believe) and Canada.

PRS Foundation itself achieved the Keychange Pledge target, ensuring that women, gender-diverse and mixed gender groups make up at least 50% of the talent funded outside of targeted action schemes. In 2020, PRS Foundation extended this commitment, pledging that 60% of all music creator grantees would be women, mixed gender groups and gender minority music creators by 2022.

In 2025, Keychange and PRS Foundation received the LIVE Workforce Award at the Live Awards in recognition of the initiative's impact on the live music industry workforce.

=== POWER UP ===
POWER UP is an ambitious long-term initiative co-founded by PRS Foundation and Ben Wynter in January 2021 to tackle anti-Black racism and racial disparities in the UK music sector.

The initiative was developed in response to the Black Lives Matter movement and #TheShowMustBePausedUK in June 2020, shaped by over 80 Black music professionals. A PRS Foundation survey of 400 Black applicants found that 78% had experienced racism within the music industry, 90% agreed there was a lack of visibility of Black industry professionals in senior roles, and 69% agreed that music funding was less accessible for Black talent.

POWER UP is managed by PRS Foundation in partnership with YouTube Music, Beggars Group and the Black Music Coalition, with support from Creative Scotland, Arts Council of Wales, Paul Hamlyn Foundation, Spotify, and major UK music industry organisations including AIM, BPI, FAC, The Ivors Academy, MMF, MPA, MPG, Musicians' Union, PPL, PRS for Music and the PRS Members' Fund.

By 2024, POWER UP had received over 1,200 applications requesting over £12.8 million in grant support, investing over £1.1 million into participants' projects. The 160-person network includes participants who have gone on to win BRIT Awards, Mercury Prizes, and appointments to senior industry roles.

In 2022, POWER UP received the inaugural IMPALA Changemaker Award, recognising the scale and speed of its impact.

== Relationship with PRS for Music ==
PRS Foundation operates as an independent registered charity, separate from PRS for Music, although PRS for Music is the Foundation's primary donor and founded the organisation in 2000.

PRS for Music's grants to PRS Foundation are primarily funded from non-licensing revenues, most notably from interest earned on royalties awaiting distribution. As interest rates were below 1% for more than a decade and PRS for Music pays out royalties more quickly, available funds decreased, leading to the 2023 multi-year funding agreement.

The core donation from PRS for Music enables PRS Foundation to raise between £1.5–2 million annually from other sources, allowing it to reach more music creators. The Foundation's independence allows it to maintain a proactive and inclusive approach to funding across all genres and career stages.

== Governance ==
PRS Foundation is governed by a board of trustees. The current chair is Simon Platz, managing director of Bucks Music Group.

== Impact and notable grantees ==
PRS Foundation has supported some of the UK's most successful contemporary music creators at crucial early stages of their careers. Seven of the last eight Mercury Prize winners received PRS Foundation support, including Little Simz, who won in 2022. In 2022, nine of the twelve Mercury Prize nominees had received Foundation support.

Notable artists and composers who have received PRS Foundation funding include:

- Little Simz
- Wolf Alice
- Dave
- Sam Fender
- Years & Years
- AJ Tracey
- Anna Meredith
- Glass Animals
- Ezra Collective
- Ghetts
- Floating Points
- Nadine Shah
- Imogen Heap
- Idles
- Chalk
- Kae Tempest
- Shiva Feshareki
- Yard Act
- Yola
- Jade Bird
- Kojey Radical
- Emily Burns

The Foundation has also supported award winners and nominees at the BRIT Awards, Ivors, RPS Awards, AIM Awards, MOBO Awards and Grammy Awards.

In 2022, PRS Foundation supported 440 new music projects, with annual application numbers exceeding 4,800 – a 20% increase from previous years.

== See also ==
- PRS for Music
- Music industry
- Arts funding
- Keychange
- Mercury Prize
- Women in music
