= Vanessa Reed =

British music executive

- Born: December 1974 (age 51)
- Citizenship: British
- Education: Exeter College, Oxford (Music, 1991–1993); University of Southampton (BA Hons First Class, French and Music, 1993–1997); Harvard Kennedy School (Executive Education)
- Occupation: Music executive
- Known for: Founding Keychange; CEO of PRS Foundation (2008–2019); President/CEO of New Music USA (2019–2025); CEO of Royal Liverpool Philharmonic (2025–present)
- Spouse: Eddie Berg
- Awards: BBC Radio 4 Woman's Hour Power List 2018 (3rd); Royal Philharmonic Society Award (2017); Music Week Women in Music Roll of Honour (2018)

Vanessa Reed (born December 1974) is a British music executive and cultural leader. She is currently Chief Executive of the Royal Liverpool Philharmonic, a position she assumed in June 2025, becoming the first woman to hold the role in the organisation's 185-year history.

Reed is recognised for founding Keychange, a pioneering gender equality initiative in the music industry, and for her leadership of PRS Foundation from 2008 to 2019. She served as president and CEO of New Music USA from 2019 to 2025.

In 2018, Reed was named the third most powerful woman in music by BBC Radio 4's Woman's Hour Power List, after Beyoncé and Taylor Swift.

== Early life and education ==
Reed studied music at Exeter College, Oxford from 1991 to 1993. She subsequently earned a first-class BA Honours degree in French and Music from the University of Southampton (1993–1997).

Reed has Liverpool connections through her father, who studied law at the University of Liverpool in the 1960s and was a regular attendee at Liverpool Philharmonic Hall. She is married to Eddie Berg, founder of FACT, Liverpool's centre for film, art and creative technology.

Reed completed an executive education programme on leadership at Harvard Kennedy School.

== Career ==
=== Early career (1997–2008) ===
Reed began her career as Promotions Manager at the British Music Information Centre (now Sound and Music) from October 1997 to December 2000.

Reed has previously served as Grants Manager at the European Cultural Foundation in Amsterdam and has worked as Senior Consultant at ABL cultural consulting. During this period, she also served as Chair of Sound UK Arts, a national organisation supporting the contemporary music sector.

=== PRS Foundation (2008–2019) ===
In June 2008, Reed was appointed Chief Executive of PRS Foundation, the UK's leading charitable funder of new music and talent development.

During her 11-year tenure, Reed tripled the Foundation's resources for organisations, composers, songwriters and artists, introducing an array of national and international programmes.

Reed created several flagship programmes for PRS Foundation that reshaped UK music funding, including Momentum Music Fund, New Music Biennial and Women Make Music.

Under Reed's leadership, PRS Foundation awarded over £26 million to more than 4,100 new music initiatives. She introduced major partnerships with Spotify, BBC Music Introducing, BBC Radio 3, PPL, Paul Hamlyn Foundation, the European Commission's Creative Europe programme, and the Arts Councils in Wales, Scotland, Northern Ireland and Ireland.

In 2017, Reed founded Keychange, an international initiative addressing gender imbalances in the music industry, in collaboration with Musikcentrum Öst (Sweden) and Reeperbahn Festival (Germany). Over 750 organisations worldwide have signed the pledge, including major festivals such as the BBC Proms, Roskilde Festival and Way Out West. Keychange has been recognised with multiple international awards including from Classical Next in Rotterdam and the Royal Philharmonic Society.

Reed continued to support Keychange in a voluntary role as Honorary Chair after departing PRS Foundation.

=== Recognition and awards ===
In September 2018, Reed was named the third most powerful woman in music by BBC Radio 4's Woman's Hour Power List, after Beyoncé and Taylor Swift. The judging panel, chaired by BBC journalist Tina Daheley, recognised Reed's "huge impact across the board", particularly through Keychange. Classical music writer Jessica Duchen commented: "She's had a huge impact across the board, and the Keychange initiative which involved getting so many international festivals to sign up to a pledge to gender parity, is a stunning development in the music world as a whole."

Reed was inducted into Music Week's Women in Music Awards Roll of Honour in 2018. That same year, she accepted Music Week's Outstanding Contribution to Charity Award on behalf of PRS Foundation.

Additional honours include:

- Royal Philharmonic Society Award for New Music Biennial 2017
- The Hospital Club's Innovation Awards
- She Said So's Alternative Women Power List
- Fellowship from Leeds College of Music

=== Board memberships and advisory roles ===
Reed served as a board member of the Royal Liverpool Philharmonic from 2016 to 2019. She was an ambassador for the University of Liverpool and collaborated with Liverpool City Council to support emerging musicians.

=== New Music USA (2019–2025) ===
In April 2019, Reed was appointed president and CEO of New Music USA, succeeding Ed Harsh. She assumed the role in August 2019, based in New York City.

During her tenure, Reed launched initiatives that expanded the organisation's scope, addressed inequities in the field and built community, including the New Music Solidatiry Fund, Next Jazz Legacy, Amplifying Voices, Reel Change and Ravinia's Breaking Barriers Festival. Reed also served as advisor to the Recording Academy's New York chapter from 2021 to 2022.

=== Royal Liverpool Philharmonic (2025–present) ===
In February 2025, the Royal Liverpool Philharmonic announced Reed's appointment as Chief Executive, making her the first woman to hold the position in the organisation's 185-year history. She assumed the role on 2 June 2025, succeeding Michael Eakin.

== Personal life ==
Reed is married to Eddie Berg, founder of FACT, Liverpool's foundation for art and creative technology. She is a supporter of Liverpool F.C.

== See also ==
- Keychange
- PRS Foundation
- New Music USA
- Royal Liverpool Philharmonic
- Women in music
