= Constant Follower =

Scottish Experimental Folk Music project led by Stephen McAll

- The vocalists of Constant Follower, 2025

Background information
- Origin: Stirling, Scotland
- Genres: Experimental Folk, Slowcore
- Years active: 2016–present
- Labels: Shimmy-Disc; Golden Hum Recordings; Last Night From Glasgow
- Members: Stephen McAll; Kathleen (Kessi) Stosch; Andrew (Kurd) Pankhurst; Amy Campbell; David Guild; Gareth Perrie
- Website: www.constantfollower.com

Constant Follower is a Scottish experimental Folk music project led by songwriter Stephen McAll. The debut album, Neither Is, Nor Ever Was (2021), co-produced by McAll and Shimmy-Disc founder Mark Kramer, was shortlisted for the 2022 Scottish Album of the Year Award. A collaborative follow-up with guitarist Scott William Urquhart, Even Days Dissolve (2023), made the 2023 SAY Award Longlist. The second Constant Follower album, The Smile You Send Out Returns to You (2025), co-produced by McAll and Dan Duszynski (Loma, Sub Pop), entered several UK charts including No. 2 in Scotland, No. 1 on the Official Independent Breakers Chart, No. 14 on the Official Albums Sales Chart, and No. 10 on the Official Vinyl Albums Chart, and was longlisted for the 2025 SAY Award.

== History ==
Constant Follower formed in 2016 around McAll in Stirling, Scotland. The debut LP Neither Is, Nor Ever Was was released on Shimmy-Disc in October 2021 to positive reviews. The album featured on multiple Album of the Year lists and was Shortlisted for the SAY Award the following year.

In April 2023 McAll and Scott William Urquhart released the collaborative LP Even Days Dissolve on McAll's Golden Hum Recordings. Featuring the voice of Scottish poet Norman MacCaig on two tracks and several other collaborators including German Harper Andy Aquarius, Mark Tranmer (GNAC, The Montgolfier Brothers), CRPNTR and Matt Carmichael (saxophone); it was longlisted for the SAY Award the same year.

The Smile You Send Out Returns to You followed in February 2025 via Last Night From Glasgow. The album received positive coverage, appeared on multiple Albums of the Year lists, and was longlisted for the 2025 SAY Award. Album credits and single descriptions cite co-production by McAll and Dan Duszynski.

== Style and reception ==
Writers describe Constant Follower as experimental folk music with slowcore adjacency, favouring space, close vocal delivery with soaring harmonies, and atmospheric arrangements.

Early reviews characterised the band's debut as part of the slowcore tradition, noting pacing and atmosphere that evoked the sound of Minnesotan duo Low. McAll's fingerstyle guitar, on tracks such as "Weave of the World", has been likened to that of Scottish Folk musician Bert Jansch. Other critics drew parallels with Red House Painters and the atmospheric folk of Fleet Foxes. Elsewhere, reviewers have likened the band's dynamic range to the "sonic intensity of Talk Talk," and compared their textured melancholy to Mojave 3's reflective dream-folk.

=== Artwork ===
McAll has emphasised the visual presentation of Constant Follower's releases, highlighting in interviews "the incredible artwork that Heather Nevay created" for the 2025 album The Smile You Send Out returns To You. The album's credits list Nevay as artwork creator and Timothy O'Donnell as designer, while coverage noted the centrality of the visuals for the campaign. The full-album visualisation featured "album artwork by Heather Nevay" and "album animation by Thrown Light."

Earlier releases also placed focus on visual art: the debut LP Neither Is, Nor Ever Was credited cover art to Los Angeles painter Seonna Hong, while collaborative mini-album Even Days Dissolve listed artwork by Japanese artist Kanae Park and design by Timothy O'Donnell. The 7-inch single "Turn Around for Me" featured sleeve artwork by Scottish painter Peter Russell, noted in press materials and features at release.

=== Video ===
McAll has foregrounded video as part of Constant Follower's presentation, commissioning short films for album tracks from young and early-career filmmakers and giving them wide creative autonomy, inviting "artists to respond to the music how they feel" and avoiding band interference. He has discussed video concepts in interviews, including the "Patient Has Own Supply" clip.

=== Notable performances ===
Constant Follower showcased at South by Southwest in 2022 and 2023. The band performed at Cambridge Folk Festival in 2024. In 2022 the band released a filmed live performance from the crown of the National Wallace Monument in Stirling, directed by Martin J. Pickering.

== Members ==
Current

- Stephen McAll - vocals, guitar, instrumentation, songwriting, production (2016–present)
- Kathleen (Kessi) Stosch - vocals, bass guitar (2016–present)
- Andrew (Kurd) Pankhurst - electric guitar (2017–present)
- Amy Campbell - vocals (2019–present)
- David Guild - bass guitar (2022–present)
- Gareth Perrie - vocals, piano (2022–present)

== Discography ==
=== Studio albums ===
Year	Title	Label	Notes
2021	Neither Is, Nor Ever Was	Shimmy-Disc; Golden Hum recordings	SAY Award Shortlist 2022.
2023	Even Days Dissolve (with Scott William Urquhart)	Golden Hum Recordings	SAY Award Longlist 2023.
2025	The Smile You Send Out Returns to You	Last Night From Glasgow; Golden Hum Recordings	UK charts: SCO #2; Independent Breakers #1; Album Sales #14; Vinyl #10; Folk #3. SAY Award Longlist 2025.

=== Singles ===
- Turn Around For Me / See You Soon (AA-side 7" single, Last Night From Glasgow, 2024).

== Videography ==
From Neither Is, Nor Ever Was era (2020–2022)

- "Set Aside Some Time" - directed by Martin J. Pickering; 30 July 2020.
- "I Can't Wake You" - directed by Nathalia van der Kerst; 7 November 2020.
- "Altona" - directed by Nathalia van der Kerst; 12 November 2020.
- "The Merry Dancers on TV" - stop-motion animation by Fiona Burton; 2021.
- "Weave of the World" - directed by Martin J. Pickering; 22 September 2021.
- "What's Left To Say" - stop-motion animation by George Farrow-Hawkins; 30 September 2021.
- "Spirits In The Roof Tree" - directed by Michael Prince; 14 October 2021.
- Neither Is, Nor Ever Was - 42-minute album film directed by Sean Hall; 2 March 2022.
- "WEICHA" - stop-motion animation by Alejandro Colunga, Paper Brain; 11 March 2022.
- "One Word Away" - stop-motion animation by Greer Pester; 15 April 2022.

From Even Days Dissolve (2023)

- "Watching The Black River Run" - Directed by Martin J. Pickering; 2023.
- "Space Between Stars" - stop-motion animation by Tsumugi Yagi; 2023.
- "Waves Crash Here" - stop-motion animation by George Farrow-Hawkins; 2 March 2023.
- "Wildlife Cameraman (Summer Farm)" - stop-motion animation by Erentia Bedeker of Wreckless Creative; 12 April 2023.

From Turn Around For Me / See You Soon (AA-side single) (2024)

- "Turn Around For Me" - stop-motion animation by Tsumugi Yagi; 9 May 2024.
- "See You Soon" - directed by Stephen McAll; 21 June 2024.

From The Smile You Send Out Returns to You (2024–2025)

- "Whole Be" - directed by Peter Lilly (Code Word Zebra); Aug 2024.
- "All Is Well" - directed by Kris Boyle; Sep 2024.
- "Patient Has Own Supply" - directed by Martin J. Pickering; Nov 2024.
- "Almost Time To Go" - directed by Kris Boyle; 16 Jan 2025.
- "The Smile You Send Out Returns To You" - stop-motion animation by Emmerson New; 2025.
- "The Smile You Send Out Returns To You" - official album visualiser; 2025.
- "Gentle Teaching" - stop-motion animation by Tsumugi Yagi; 2025.
- "Happy Birthdays" - directed by Martin J. Pickering; September 2025.
- "It’s Only Silence" - directed by Kris Boyle; featuring Mark Tranmer (GNAC); Oct 2025.

== Awards and nominations ==
- 2021: Scottish Alternative Music Awards - Shortlist for Best Acoustic.
- 2022: Scottish Album of the Year Award - Shortlist for Neither Is, Nor Ever Was.
- 2023: Scottish Album of the Year Award - Longlist for Even Days Dissolve (with Scott William Urquhart).
- 2025: Scottish Album of the Year Award - Longlist for The Smile You Send Out Returns to You.
