= Keychange =

Belgian gender equality initiative

- Formation: 2017
- Founder: Vanessa Reed; PRS Foundation; Reeperbahn Festival; Musikcentrum Öst
- Type: International initiative / Non-profit organisation
- Purpose: Gender equality in the music industry
- Headquarters: Brussels, Belgium (Keychange ASBL)
- Region served: Worldwide
- Members: 750+ pledge signatories
- Executive Director: Tiffany Fukuma (Keychange ASBL)
- Affiliations: Creative Europe; PRS Foundation; Reeperbahn Festival; Musikcentrum Öst
- Budget: €1.4 million (2019–2023, Creative Europe funding)
- Website: keychange.eu

Keychange is a global movement working to achieve gender equality in the music industry. Founded in 2017 by Vanessa Reed, then CEO of PRS Foundation, in collaboration with Reeperbahn Festival (Germany) and Musikcentrum Öst (Sweden), the initiative addresses gender imbalances through a talent development programme, an international pledge for gender equality, research and advocacy.

Since its launch, Keychange has supported over 270 women and gender-diverse artists and music industry professionals through talent development programmes and secured commitments from over 750 music organisations worldwide through the Keychange Pledge. The initiative has expanded to North America, with Keychange U.S. launching in June 2022 and Keychange Canada following.

== History ==
=== Foundation (2015–2017) ===
Keychange was initiated by Vanessa Reed, then CEO of PRS Foundation, in 2015. Together with initial partners Musikcentrum Öst (Sweden), Reeperbahn Festival (Germany), BIME (Bilbao, Spain), Tallinn Music Week (Estonia) and Iceland Airwaves, Reed developed the project towards its official launch in September 2017. By the time of launch, Mutek in Montreal, Canada, had joined as an overseas partner.

The project was launched in response to stark gender disparities in the music industry. In 2017, women made up only 26% of the line-up of major music festivals in the UK and less than 10% of headliners in the United States. The initial programme received €200,000 in funding from the European Union's Creative Europe programme for a two-year pilot phase.

=== Keychange 1.0 (2017–2019) ===
The inaugural Keychange programme supported 60 emerging female artists and innovators from seven European countries, providing showcase opportunities at partner festivals, creative labs, mentoring and professional development.

The Keychange Pledge was proposed by the original festival partners to demonstrate their commitment to gender equality beyond talent development. The Pledge called on festivals and music organisations to achieve a 50:50 gender balance across their line-ups, conferences and commissions by 2022. By September 2018, over 140 festivals had signed the pledge.

==== First Manifesto ====
In November 2018, Keychange launched its first Manifesto for Change at the European Parliament in Brussels. The manifesto was presented by Vanessa Reed and outlined recommendations for collective action in four core areas:

- Working conditions and role models – Addressing recruitment, remuneration, career development and sexual harassment policies
- Investment – Increasing funds from industry and public sectors for targeted programmes empowering underrepresented artists and professionals
- Research – Commissioning independent analysis of the gender gap, including economic impact studies
- Platform and visibility – Creating more opportunities for women and gender minorities to perform, speak and lead

The manifesto was formulated from the achievements, ideas and suggestions of Keychange partners and participants.

=== Keychange 2.0 (2019–2023) ===
In September 2019, the European Commission announced €1.4 million in funding from Creative Europe for a four-year expansion of Keychange, with Reeperbahn Festival taking over leadership from PRS Foundation. The programme was led by Christina Schäfers (Reeperbahn Festival) and Mia Ternström (Musikcentrum Öst).

Keychange 2.0 aimed to support 216 participants over three years (74 per year in 2020, 2021, and 2022) from twelve countries: Canada, Estonia, France, Germany, Iceland, Ireland, Italy, Norway, Poland, Spain, Sweden and the UK. Partner festivals included Iceland Airwaves, Tallinn Music Week, BIME, Oslo World, Linecheck (Italy), Ireland Music Week, Liverpool Sound City, Way Out West, MAMA (France), Mutek and BreakOut West (Canada).

The programme included an extended schedule of training and creative workshops, mentoring, and the creation of a global database of participants and pledge signatories. Collecting societies including SACEM (France), FACTOR (Canada), SGAE (Spain), STEF (Iceland), STIM (Sweden), IMRO (Ireland) and SOCAN Foundation provided support.

=== Keychange ASBL and international expansion (2022–present) ===
In June 2022, Keychange launched in the United States with a $250,000 founding investment from TuneCore and Believe. The U.S. expansion was developed in response to persistent gender inequality: a 2022 study by the Annenberg Inclusion Initiative found that women represented only 21.8% of all artists, 12.7% of songwriters, and 2.8% of producers in popular music. Keychange U.S. was established as a charitable non-profit organisation.

In September 2023, Keychange partners founded Keychange ASBL, a Brussels-based non-profit organisation serving as the European hub of the initiative. Keychange ASBL drives programme development across Europe, strengthens international collaborations, expands membership and builds strategic partnerships supporting structural change in the music industry.

In January 2025, Tiffany Fukuma was appointed as executive director of Keychange ASBL. Fukuma, who grew up between France and Japan, holds master's degrees in philosophy and marketing, and previously served as managing director of Trans Europe Halles, one of Europe's largest cultural networks.

==== Second Manifesto and Impact Report ====
In April 2024, Keychange released its Impact Evaluation Report (2018–2023) and unveiled Keychange Manifesto 2.0 at Tallinn Music Week in Estonia. The updated manifesto serves as a renewed call to action for the global music industry, urging policymakers and organisations to improve working conditions, prioritise intersectional representation and create safer spaces. The manifesto was presented to the European Commission to drive further systemic change.

In November 2024, Keychange launched its latest iteration, the Keychange Talent Leadership Programme, running until April 2027 with support from Creative Europe.

== Structure and programmes ==
=== The Keychange Pledge ===
The Keychange Pledge is a public commitment by festivals, music organisations and companies to achieve at least 50:50 gender balance in their programming, staffing and operations. Over 750 organisations worldwide have signed the pledge as of 2025.

Signatories include major festivals such as End of the Road Festival, Roskilde Festival, Royal Albert Hall, Barbican Centre, Winter Jazzfest, Way Out West, record labels including Bella Union and organisations including Sound and Music. The Reeperbahn Festival itself achieved a 50:50 balance ahead of the 2022 target.

=== Talent Development Programmes ===
Keychange has supported over 270 participants across multiple cohorts. The programmes explicitly welcome applications from trans people (AMAB and AFAB), agender, non-binary and gender-expansive individuals, emphasising intersectionality as vital to achieving equality.

=== Keychange Inspiration Award ===
The Keychange Inspiration Award honours individuals who have made extraordinary and pioneering contributions to the music industry and serve as role models for the next generation. From 2025, the global Keychange community has been able to submit nominations for the award.

== Research and advocacy ==
Keychange has commissioned significant research on gender distribution in the music industry. In partnership with the German federal government, Keychange developed a comprehensive study examining gender distribution across all segments of German music culture and the music industry, including employment conditions, salary distribution and career opportunities.

In 2024, Keychange released a study on gender diversity in the German music market.

The organisation's advocacy work influences policy at European and national levels, with manifestos presented to the European Parliament and European Commission.

== Ambassadors and supporters ==
Keychange's ambassadors include prominent musicians and industry figures:

- Shirley Manson (Garbage)
- Kate Nash
- Peaches
- Corinne Bailey Rae
- Nadine Shah
- Tegan and Sara
- Aurora
- Tony Visconti
- Alice Phoebe Lou
- Carla Marie Williams
- Joy Denalane
- Tones and I
- Emily Eavis (Glastonbury Festival)

The initiative has received public support from artists including Dua Lipa, Paulette Long, Mirga Gražinytė-Tyla and Lauren Mayberry (Chvrches).

== Partners and funding ==
Keychange is supported by the Creative Europe programme of the European Union and works with numerous partners including:

=== Core partners ===
- Reeperbahn Festival (Germany)
- PRS Foundation (UK)
- Musikcentrum Öst (Sweden)
- Keychange ASBL (Belgium)

=== Festival partners ===
- Tallinn Music Week (Estonia)
- Iceland Airwaves (Iceland)
- Oslo World (Norway)
- BIME (Bilbao, Spain)
- Linecheck (Italy)
- Liverpool Sound City (UK)
- Way Out West (Sweden)
- MAMA (France)
- Mutek (Canada)
- BreakOut West (Canada)
- Ireland Music Week (Ireland)
- Different Sounds Festival
- Artist in Bloom
- Music Export Poland (Poland)

=== Funding and support partners ===
- GEMA (Germany)
- STEF (Iceland)
- STIM (Sweden)
- SACEM (France)
- Foundation SGAE (Spain)
- IMRO (Ireland)
- FACTOR (Canada)
- SOCAN Foundation (Canada)
- Gorwelion Horizons
- Roskilde Festival
- SoundCloud
- Songtrust
- Sound and Music
- Talent Norge
- Norsk Tipping
- Musicians' Union (UK)
- TuneCore (U.S.)
- Believe (France / U.S.)
