= The Smile You Send Out Returns to You =

Studio album by Constant Follower
- Released: 28 February 2025
- Recorded: 2023–2024
- Studios: Hum of Gold, Stirling
- Genres: Neofolk; slowcore
- Length: 39:06
- Labels: Last Night from Glasgow; Golden Hum Recordings
- Producers: Stephen McAll; Dan Duszynski

Constant Follower chronology
Neither Is, Nor Ever Was (2021)	The Smile You Send Out Returns to You (2025)

The Smile You Send Out Returns to You is the second studio album by Scottish experimental folk band Constant Follower, led by Stephen McAll. It was released on 28 February 2025 by Last Night from Glasgow. The album entered several UK charts, including No. 14 on the Official Albums Sales Chart, No. 10 on the Official Vinyl Albums Chart, No. 6 on the Official Independent Albums Chart, No. 1 on the Official Independent Album Breakers Chart, No. 2 in Scotland, and No. 3 on the Official Folk Albums Chart in March 2025.

== Background and recording ==
Recording took place at McAll's Hum of Gold studio in Stirling. Mixing and co-production were carried out by Dan Duszynski of Sub Pop records band Loma at Dandy Sounds in Dripping Springs, Texas. Mastering was by Carl Saff in Chicago.

== Composition and themes ==
Coverage describes a song cycle concerned with recovery, mental health, addiction and sobriety, and parenthood and care, set to restrained arrangements with slowcore adjacency.

== Artwork ==
The sleeve features a painting by Scottish artist Heather Nevay. Band materials credit Nevay, and the artist identifies the work as Thin-skinned boy. The design is credited to Timothy O'Donnell on the album sleeve.

== Release and formats ==
The album was released on 28 February 2025 by Last Night from Glasgow. Formats included gatefold vinyl pressings in pink, clear, and white; compact disc; and digital download. It was released to streaming platforms on the same date by Golden Hum Recordings.

== Singles ==
- "Whole Be" – released August 2024
- "All Is Well" – released September 2024
- "Almost Time to Go" – released January 2025
- "Patient Has Own Supply" – 2024 single ahead of the album

== Videos ==
Official videos were released via the Constant Follower YouTube channel.

- "Whole Be" – directed by Peter Lilly (Code Word Zebra)
- "All Is Well" – directed by Kris Boyle
- "Almost Time to Go" – directed by Kris Boyle
- "Patient Has Own Supply" – directed by Martin J. Pickering
- "It's Only Silence" – directed by Kris Boyle, featuring Mark Tranmer (Gnac)

== Critical reception ==
Clash magazine described the record as "a song cycle of recovery and transcendence". The Scotsman praised its "mellow, melodic" qualities and "sumptuous sea of sound". Additionally, Various Small Flames highlighted the album's treatment of light and empathy within darker subjects. God Is In the TV noted the balance of richer sonics with intimacy. Under the Radar covered the campaign and premieres around the title track and "Whole Be". Backseat Mafia awarded it 9/10 and called it "a stunning, introspective album of intelligence, beauty and emotional depth".

== Track listing ==
All tracks are written by Stephen McAll.

No.	Title	Length
1.	"The Smile You Send Out Returns to You"	4:15
2.	"Whole Be"	4:32
3.	"Almost Time to Go"	2:36
4.	"All Is Well"	5:59
5.	"Happy Birthdays"	7:31
6.	"Gentle Teaching"	4:33
7.	"Patient Has Own Supply"	4:42
8.	"It's Only Silence"	4:58
Total length:		39:06

== Personnel ==
Credits adapted from the album's Bandcamp page and label listings.

Constant Follower

- Stephen McAll – vocals, guitars, synthesisers, piano, bass, production, recording
- Andrew (Kurd) Pankhurst – guitars
- Kathleen (Kessi) Stosch – vocals
- Amy Campbell – vocals
- David Guild – bass
- Gareth Perrie – piano

Additional musicians

- Dan Duszynski – vocals, guitar, synthesisers, drums, co-production, mixing
- Jim Chadwin – electric guitar
- Mark Tranmer (a.k.a. Gnac; of The Montgolfier Brothers) – piano, guitar, mellotron (track 8)
- Andy Aquarius – harp (track 3)
- Islay McAll – sample (track 1)

Technical

- Stephen McAll – recording at Hum of Gold (Stirling)
- Dan Duszynski – recording, mixing, co-production at Dandy Sounds (Dripping Springs, Texas)
- Carl Saff – mastering (Chicago)
- Heather Nevay – cover artwork: Thin-skinned boy

== Charts ==
Chart performance for The Smile You Send Out Returns to You
Chart (2025)	Peak position
Scottish Albums (Official Charts)	2
UK Album Sales Chart (Official Charts)	14
UK Folk Albums (Official Charts)	3
UK Independent Albums (Official Charts)	6
UK Physical Albums (Official Charts)	14
UK Vinyl Albums (Official Charts)	10

== Accolades ==
- Longlisted – Scottish Album of the Year Award 2025
