= Matt Carmichael =

Matt Carmichael may refer to:

- Matt Carmichael (journalist), Australian sports journalist
- Matt Carmichael (footballer) (born 1964), former English footballer
- Matt Carmichael (jazz musician), Scottish jazz tenor saxophonist
