= Neither Is, Nor Ever Was =

Studio album by Constant Follower
- Released: 1 October 2021
- Recorded: 2020–2021
- Studio: CFFC, Stirling; La Chunky, Glasgow
- Genre: Experimental folk; slowcore
- Label: Shimmy-Disc; Joyful Noise Recordings; Golden Hum Recordings (CD)
- Producer: Stephen McAll; Kramer

Constant Follower chronology
Neither Is, Nor Ever Was (2021)	The Smile You Send Out Returns to You (2025)

Neither Is, Nor Ever Was is the debut studio album by Scottish experimental folk band Constant Follower, led by Stephen McAll. It was released on 1 October 2021 by Shimmy-Disc and Joyful Noise Recordings, with a compact disc edition issued by Golden Hum Recordings. The album was shortlisted for the 2022 Scottish Album of the Year Award.

== Background and recording ==
Writers report that Stephen McAll composed the material largely on Scotland's West Coast following a violent assault in his teens and a prolonged period of recovery.

Recording was led by McAll at his CFFC studio in Stirling, Scotland with further sessions at La Chunky in Glasgow; Mark Kramer, professionally known as Kramer, mixed and mastered at Noise Miami. Sources describe the album as co-produced by McAll and Kramer.

== Release ==
The album was issued on 1 October 2021 by Shimmy-Disc and Joyful Noise Recordings, with a Golden Hum Recordings CD edition.

== Composition ==
Critics align the record with Experimental Folk and Slowcore, pointing to sparse instrumentation, close-miked vocals and an emphasis on space and restraint.

== Artwork ==
The sleeve features Seonna Hong's painting The Disappearing Act.

== Critical reception ==
The Scotsman called the album "gentle, understated, fully formed and utterly beguiling," noting it was composed in isolation in a Hebridean cabin. Clash (magazine) praised the project's "simple poignancy" around the campaign singles, while Under the Radar (magazine) covered the video cycle around the album's release.

== Accolades ==
- Shortlisted – Scottish Album of the Year Award 2022.

== Track listing ==
All songs written by Stephen McAll.

1. "I Can't Wake You"
2. "The Merry Dancers on TV"
3. "Set Aside Some Time"
4. "Spirits in the Roof Tree"
5. "Altona"
6. "Weave of the World"
7. "One Word Away"
8. "Little Marble"
9. "What's Left to Say"
10. "WEICHA"

== Personnel ==
Credits per label and release pages.

- Stephen McAll - vocals; guitars; synths; keys; bass; production
- Andrew (Kurd) Pankhurst - guitars; vocals
- Kathleen (Kessi) Stosch - vocals; synth; bass
- Amy Campbell - vocals; keys
- Jim Chadwin - electric guitar (track 1)
- Kenny Bates - electric guitar (track 4)
- Mark Tranmer (GNAC, The Montgolfier Brothers) - piano (track 6)
- Kramer - production; mixing; mastering
- Johnny Smillie - engineering
- Seonna Hong - cover art
- Ryan Hover - design

== Studios ==
- CFFC, Stirling - recording
- La Chunky, Glasgow - additional recording
- Noise Miami, Florida - mixing and mastering

== Singles ==
- "Set Aside Some Time" - released 29 July 2020.
- "I Can't Wake You" - released 7 November 2020.
- "Weave of the World" - released 22 September 2021.

== Videos ==
- "Set Aside Some Time" - directed by Martin J. Pickering.
- "I Can't Wake You" - directed by Nathalia van der Kerst.
- "The Merry Dancers on TV" - stop-motion animation by Fiona Burton.
- "Weave of the World" - directed by Martin J. Pickering.
- "Spirits in the Roof Tree" - directed by Michael Prince.
- "What's Left to Say" - stop-motion animation by George Farrow-Hawkins.
- "WEICHA" - digital animation by Alejandro Colunga (Paper Brain).
