= John Duffy (composer) =

American composer (1926–2015)

- Born: June 23, 1926; New York, New York, U.S.
- Died: December 22, 2015 (aged 89); Norfolk, Virginia, U.S.
- Education: The New School
- Occupation: Composer
- Organizations: American Music Center

John Duffy (June 23, 1926 – December 22, 2015) was an American composer who created more than 300 works from symphonic music and operas to music for the concert hall, theatre, and film and television. In 1974 he founded the organization Meet The Composer under the auspices of the New York State Council on the Arts and the American Music Center. The organization helped to create platforms for contemporary composers to discuss new works with audiences; notably coordinating summer festivals of contemporary music for the New York Philharmonic and helping to fund composer-in-residence programs with 32 symphony orchestras throughout the United States among many other successful projects. He continued to lead the organization until 1996.

== Biography ==
Born in Manhattan, Duffy was one of fourteen children born to his Irish immigrant parents, Thomas Duffy and Anna Quirk. Raised in Woodlawn, Bronx, he enlisted in the United States Navy during World War II and fought in the Battle of Okinawa. After the war he studied music composition at The New School with Henry Cowell and Solomon Rosowsky, and with Aaron Copland at the Tanglewood Music Center. Soon after completing his studies, he became music director of the Antioch Shakespeare Festival which was founded by Arthur Lithgow. He went on to hold similar posts at the Guthrie Theater, the Long Wharf Theater and the American Shakespeare Festival; writing several compositions for plays presented by those organizations. He also wrote scores for the Broadway productions of J. P. Donleavy's The Ginger Man and Barbara Garson's MacBird!. He won two Emmy Awards for the music that he wrote for the documentaries: A Talent for Life: Jews of the Italian Renaissance (1979, NBC) and Heritage: Civilization and the Jews (1984, PBS). He was commissioned by the Sierra Club to compose "Symphony No. 1 — Utah" (premiered 1989 at Lincoln Center), and created "A Time for Remembrance," to commemorate the 50th Anniversary of the attack on Pearl Harbor for the U.S. Department of the Interior.

Duffy died at his home in Norfolk, Virginia in 2015 after a long battle with cancer. He was married to Dorothy Rouse-Bottom.
