= Crystalpunk =

Studio album by Chalk
- Released: 13 March 2026
- Studio: Attica Audio
- Genre: Post-punk; electronic rock; dance-punk
- Length: 38:55
- Label: ALTER Music
- Producer: Ross Cullen, Chris W Ryan

Crystalpunk is the debut studio album by the Northern Irish band Chalk. It was released on 13 March 2026 through ALTER Music. The album follows the band's Conditions EP trilogy and was written and performed by Chalk, with production by Ross Cullen and Chris W Ryan.

The album combines post-punk, electronic rock, industrial, and dance-music influences. Critics discussed its relationship to Belfast, identity, and the band's movement from earlier post-punk and hardcore-influenced EPs toward a more electronic sound. It received positive reviews from critics, and was included in midyear best-albums lists by the Guardian and NME. Crystalpunk reached number one on the UK Dance Albums Chart and appeared on several other Official Charts Company specialist charts.

== Background and release ==
Chalk released the Conditions EP trilogy before Crystalpunk. By January 2026, the group had become a duo consisting of the vocalist and producer Ross Cullen and the guitarist and synthesizer player Benedict Goddard, and had signed to ALTER Music. In the Guardian, Brian Coney wrote that Cullen and Goddard met while studying film at university and spent five years building the live show that preceded the album.

Chalk announced that the album was set for release on 13 March 2026 alongside the release of the single "I.D.C." on 14 January. "I.D.C." followed a BBC 6 Music premiere by Huw Stephens and the album announcement came ahead of South by Southwest appearances, a North American run, and UK and European headline dates.

The album was released on 13 March 2026 in digital, CD, and vinyl formats. The album was produced by Cullen and Chris W Ryan, recorded at Attica Audio, and mastered by Chris Gehringer with assistance from Will Quinnell at Sterling Sound.

== Music and lyrics ==
Chalk described "crystalpunk" as the album's own stylistic frame. In an interview with Northern Transmissions, Goddard said that the title joined the album's dance and electronic side with the band's guitar-based roots, allowing the duo to combine disparate influences on the record. Cullen said in the same interview that the group drew from older dance influences such as Underworld while also paying attention to contemporary production. In The Guardian, Goddard said the title referred to beauty, electronic textures, sharpness, and destruction, and that it helped define the album's sound.

Several sources connected the album to Belfast and post-Troubles identity. The band described "Béal Feirste" as revolving around experiences shared by the two members and their identity growing up in Ireland. In The Guardian, Cullen described the song as being about feeling unclaimed by either side of the community divide, while Coney linked the album to the identity questions that followed the Troubles. Hot Press also connected "Béal Feirste" to growing up in the shadow of the Troubles, while noting its forward-looking tone.

Reviewers described the album as a fusion of post-punk, electronic, rock, and dance influences. Sydney Peterson of Beats per Minute wrote that Chalk combine electronic, punk, rock, and dance or techno elements, and described "Béal Feirste" as the record's most politically charged track and a reference to Belfast. I Die: You Die characterised the album as synth-heavy machine rock with danceable post-punk rhythms and electronic atmosphere, while noting the importance of drums, bass, rhythmic percussion, and samples to the album's effect. Gareth O'Malley of When the Horn Blows wrote that the album moves between industrial-electronic post-punk, personal material, and references to Belfast and the city's dance scene. Felicity Newton of Dork wrote that the record brings punk confrontation together with rave culture and presents the band's questions of inheritance and belonging through movement and noise.

== Critical reception ==
Professional ratings
Aggregate scores
| Source | Rating |
|---|---|
| Metacritic | 83/100 |
Review scores
| Source | Rating |
| Beats Per Minute | 84% |
| Clash | 8/10 |
| DIY | 4/5 stars |
| Dork | 5/5 stars |
| Hot Press | 8/10 |
| The Irish Times | 4/5 stars |
| New Noise Magazine | 4.5/5 stars |
| NME | 5/5 stars |

Crystalpunk received positive reviews from music critics. Metacritic assigned the album a score of 83 out of 100 based on five critic reviews, indicating "universal acclaim". Peterson gave the album a score of 84% for Beats Per Minute, writing that the record presents a fully formed identity and that its production links rock, electronic, and dance styles. O'Malley reviewed the album for When the Horn Blows and framed it as the result of the band's seven-year development, highlighting "Can't Feel It", "One-Nine-Eight-Zero", "Béal Feirste", and "Ache" as central tracks.

Karina Selvig of New Noise Magazine wrote that the album maintains pressure and control rather than releasing tension, singling out "Skem", "One-Nine-Eight-Zero", "Longer", and "Béal Feirste". NME described the album as "a knockout collection of arresting dance-punk", while Clash called it an homage to the band's home city.

In DIY, Ciaran Picker gave the album four out of five stars and described it as a forceful, abrasive record about relationships with place, people, and purpose. Newton gave the album five out of five stars in Dork, writing that its punk, industrial, electronic, and rave elements serve the record's questions of identity and belonging. John Walshe of Hot Press gave the album an 8/10 rating and highlighted "Tongue", "Pain", "Skem", "Ache", "One-Nine-Eight-Zero", "Can't Feel It", "Longer", and "Béal Feirste". In the Irish Times, Tony Clayton-Lea gave the album four out of five stars and wrote that its punk, techno, and electronic influences encouraged repeated listening.

== Accolades ==
Accolades for Crystalpunk
| Publication | List | Year | Rank |
|---|---|---|---|
| The Guardian | The best albums of 2026 so far | 2026 | Unranked |
| NME | The best albums of 2026... so far! | 2026 | Unranked |

== Charts ==
Crystalpunk reached number one on the UK Dance Albums Chart.

Chart performance for Crystalpunk
| Chart (2026) | Peak position |
|---|---|
| Scottish Albums (Official Charts) | 49 |
| UK Albums Sales (OCC) | 30 |
| UK Album Downloads (Official Charts) | 31 |
| UK Physical Albums (OCC) | 32 |
| UK Vinyl Albums (OCC) | 19 |
| UK Record Store (OCC) | 8 |
| UK Dance Albums (Official Charts) | 1 |
| UK Independent Albums (Official Charts) | 13 |
| UK Independent Album Breakers (OCC) | 4 |

== Track listing ==
Credits and track lengths are adapted from Bandcamp.

Crystalpunk track listing
| No. | Title | Writer(s) | Length |
|---|---|---|---|
| 1. | "Tongue" | Chalk | 2:28 |
| 2. | "Pain" | Chalk and Luke Niblock | 3:01 |
| 3. | "Can't Feel It" | Chalk | 3:37 |
| 4. | "Longer" | Chalk | 4:58 |
| 5. | "One-Nine-Eight-Zero" | Chalk and Luke Niblock | 4:06 |
| 6. | "Eclipse" | Chalk | 0:56 |
| 7. | "Skem" | Chalk and Luke Niblock | 3:48 |
| 8. | "I.D.C." | Chalk | 3:31 |
| 9. | "Béal Feirste" | Chalk | 7:59 |
| 10. | "Ache" | Chalk | 4:31 |
| Total length: | | | 38:55 |

== Personnel ==
Credits are adapted from Bandcamp.

- Ross Cullen – vocals, keyboards, synthesizer, bass, guitars, production, art direction, graphic design
- Benedict Goddard – guitars, backing vocals
- Chris W Ryan – production; mixing on "Eclipse", "Skem", and "Ache"; drums, drum machine, and synthesizer on "One-Nine-Eight-Zero" and "Longer"
- Scotty Desmarais – mixing on "Tongue", "One-Nine-Eight-Zero", "I.D.C.", and "Béal Feirste"
- Andrew Dawson – mixing on "Pain", "Can't Feel It", and "Longer"
- Chris Gehringer – mastering
- Will Quinnell – mastering assistance
- Fiontan McAleavy – drums on "Tongue", "Longer", and "Skem"
- Luke Niblock – co-writing on "Pain", "One-Nine-Eight-Zero", and "Skem"
- Sienna Lillie Munn – backing vocals on "Longer"
- Andrew Campbell – graphic design
- Patricia Rosingana – cover photography
- Glen Norwood – sleeve photography
