= Chalk (band) =

Post-punk industrial dance duo from Belfast

- Origin: Belfast, Northern Ireland
- Genres: Post-punk industrial dance
- Years active: 2021-
- Labels: Alter Music and Sun Language
- Members: Ross Cullen; Ben Goddard
- Past members: Luke Niblock
- Website: chalkbelfast.bandcamp.com

Chalk is a post-punk industrial dance duo, formed in 2021 in Belfast, Northern Ireland, consisting of Ross Cullen and Benedict Hardie-Goddard (Ben Goddard). Their debut album, Crystalpunk, was released in March 2026 and reached 30 in the UK official Album Chart and the top spot in the UK album Dance Chart.

== History ==
Ross Cullen and Ben Goddard met in Belfast as university film students. Goddard, the guitarist and synth player, has an English father and Irish mother, while Cullen, on vocals, has a Protestant father and a Catholic mother. Originally the group had a third member, Luke Niblock on drums, but he parted company with Chalk in 2025. The now duo then signed to the New York label, Alter Music. On their late 2025 USA tour Chalk deployed Fiontan MacAleavey as their drummer. Three of the tracks on Crystalpunk are credited to Luke Niblock as co-writer along with Chalk.

Their first set of releases was a trilogy of EPs, Conditions, released in 2023, Conditions II, in 2024, and then in 2025 Conditions III, containing thirteen tracks in total. The first EP and followup live performances received financial support from the charity PRS Foundation, through their Open Fund for Music Creators. Chalk was added to the BBC Music Introducing platform of artists.

The band has acknowledged the role of David Lynch in shaping the "strangeness and surealism" that feeds into Chalk's music and the visuals used in live performances. With their producer, Chris Ryan, the band loops their performances' artistry between studio and stage, taking into account how particular ideas have been received during the summer festival circuit.

In interviews the duo has expressed the view that they felt "unclaimed" by traditional community labels, but it was their wish to see an end to sectarian divisions in Northern Ireland. This is reflected in their eight minute penultimate track on Crystalpunk, "Béal Feirste". NME compared the track, that uses the Irish language name for Belfast, to Born Slippy by Underworld. The refrain stresses the phrase "shoulder to shoulder", a line from "Ireland's Call", the anthem for the Irish rugby union team, that represents both Ireland and Northern Ireland. Cullen is the son of a rugby coach and grew up playing the sport.

== Live performances ==
Chalk, at that point a three member band, played at the Reading Festival in 2023, and Glastonbury in 2025 under the BBC Music Introducing platform.

In November 2025, as a duo, Chalk performed a 28 minute live session for Seattle's KEXP radio station.. Chalk played at SXSW in Austin, Texas in March 2026 as part of the BBC Music Introducing and British Council Arts presentation. In some performances since 2025, Cullen has worn a spike covered glove, which features on the cover art of Crystalpunk, as a visual anchor.

Chalk have been the support band for Sprints, Fontaines D.C. and Idles.

== Reviews ==
Crystalpunk was included in The Guardian's June 2026 list of the best albums of the year so far, with two tracks highlighted, "Béal Feirste" and "Can't feel it". The album was described as an "instant industrial-pop classic". NME described the album as genre-fluid with a message about unity within the contrasting soundscapes.

The Independent's list of artists to watch in 2025 described Chalk's music as vast and ambitious, with fantastic live performances, at least for those able to cope with the constant strobe lighting.

== Discography ==
Album: Crystalpunk (2026)	Peak position
Scottish Albums (Official Charts)	49
UK Albums (Official Charts)	30
UK Dance Albums (Official Charts)	1
UK Album Downloads (Official Charts)	31
UK Independent Albums (Official Charts)	13

Single: Conditions II (2024)	Peak position
UK Physical Singles (Official Charts)	37
