= Creative Europe–Armenia =

Organization in Armenia

- Founded: 2018
- Purpose: Cultural diplomacy Pan-Europeanism
- Headquarters: Yerevan
- Location: Armenia
- Origins: Brussels, Belgium
- Region served: Armenia
- Affiliations: Creative Europe
- Website: www.culture.ec.europa.eu

Creative Europe–Armenia (Armenian: Ստեղծագործական Եվրոպա – Հայաստան, romanized: Steghtsagortsakan Yevropa – Hayastan) is the Armenian branch of the Creative Europe programme. Creative Europe–Armenia was founded in 2018, with the support of the European Commission, and is headquartered in Yerevan.

== History ==
The general objectives of Creative Europe are to safeguard, develop and promote European cultural and linguistic diversity and to promote Europe's cultural heritage, to strengthen the competitiveness of the European cultural and creative sectors, in particular of the audiovisual sector, with a view to promote smart, sustainable and inclusive growth. Creative Europe–Armenia was established on 20 March 2018, following the signing of a Memorandum of Understanding for the participation of Armenia in Creative Europe. The memorandum was signed by the Armenian Ministry of Culture and former European Union Commissioner for Education, Culture, Youth and Sport Tibor Navracsics. Commissioner Navracsics welcomed this new opportunity to strengthen Armenia–European Union relations through culture and noted that Armenia was the fourth Eastern Partnership member to join after Georgia, Moldova, and Ukraine. The National Assembly of Armenia subsequently ratified membership in the programme. The agreement is an important achievement in the framework of the Armenia–EU Comprehensive and Enhanced Partnership Agreement signed in November 2017. Former EU Ambassador to Armenia, Piotr Świtalski, stated "Armenia will strengthen ties with the European Union by joining the programme. The benefits of the program will be tangible not only for Armenian artists, but for regular citizens as well".

Following Armenia's accession, Armenian cultural organizations could now apply for funding. Eastern Partnership member countries are eligible for a maximum of 30% of the overall project budget.

On 20 December 2019, Armenia hosted the Create, Preserve, Enhance event under the Creative Europe programme. The event celebrated the results and achievements of the Armenian participants in the programme and was attended by members of the Delegation of the European Union to Armenia.

On 15 November 2021, Minister of Foreign Affairs of Armenia Ararat Mirzoyan highlighted the importance of Armenia's participation in Creative Europe as a symbol of Armenia's partnership and cooperation with the EU.

== See also ==
- Armenia–European Union relations
- Armenian art
- Culture of Armenia
- European integration
- Media in Armenia
