= Harrison Kerr =

American composer (1897–1978)

Harrison Kerr (b. Cleveland, Ohio, October 13, 1897; d. Norman, Oklahoma, August 1978) was an American composer of contemporary classical music, editor, administrator, and educator.

He studied in Cleveland, Ohio with James H. Rogers, in Paris with Nadia Boulanger. From 1949 to 1969, he served as professor of music and dean at the University of Oklahoma in Norman, Oklahoma.

He also served as the first Executive Secretary of the American Music Center (which he helped to found) as well as the first Executive Secretary of the American Composers Alliance. In addition, he served on the editorial boards of New Music Editions and New Music Quarterly Recordings.

Among his many works are four symphonies and an opera entitled The Tower of Kel (1958–60). His music is recorded on the Composers Recordings, Inc. label.

== Bibliography ==
- Kohlenberg, Randy B. (1997). Harrison Kerr: Portrait of a Twentieth-Century American Composer. Composers of North America series, no. 23. Scarecrow Press. ISBN 0-8108-3258-5. ISBN 978-0-8108-3258-9.
