= Sound and Music =

- The UK's charity for new music and sound
- Formation: 2008
- Founder: British Music Information Centre, Society for the Promotion of New Music, Sonic Arts Network, Contemporary Music Network
- Type: Non-profit organisation
- Headquarters: London, UK
- Affiliations: PRS Foundation, Keychange
- Website: www.soundandmusic.org

Sound and Music is the UK's national charitable agency for new music, established on 1 October 2008 from the merger of four existing bodies working in the contemporary music field: the Society for the Promotion of New Music (SPNM), the British Music Information Centre, the Contemporary Music Network and the Sonic Arts Network.

- SPNM, originally named The Committee for the Promotion of New Music, was founded in January 1943 in London by the émigré composer Francis Chagrin, to promote the creation and performance of new music by young and unestablished composers.
- The British Music Information Centre archive was founded in 1967 by the Composers’ Guild of Great Britain and originally housed within the Guild's central London office at 10 Stratford Place, off Oxford Street.
- The Contemporary Music Network was set up in the early 1970s by the Arts Council to promote contemporary music performances through extensive regional tours.
- The Sonic Arts Network was established in 1979, aiming to enable both audiences and practitioners to engage with the art of sound through a programme of festivals, events, commissions and education projects.

Sound and Music champions new music and the work of British composers and artists, promoting and supporting contemporary music, sound art and experimental music in the United Kingdom. This is achieved through partnerships with a range of organisations, live events and audience development, touring, information and advice, network building, and education.

The scores and recordings of the British Music Information Centre are now owned by Sound and Music, and are held at the University of Huddersfield in the Archives and Special Collections as The British Music Collection. The Collection joined the Google Cultural Institute in 2014.

Sound and Music is funded as a National Portfolio Organisation by Arts Council England, but supports projects throughout the United Kingdom.

== See also ==
- British Academy of Songwriters, Composers and Authors
