= New Music USA =

Music organization in New York, US

- Formation: November 8, 2011; 14 years ago
- Type: Nonprofit
- Headquarters: New York City, New York
- Website: https://newmusicusa.org/

New Music USA is a new music organization formed by the merging of the American Music Center with Meet The Composer on November 8, 2011. The new organization retains the granting programs of the two former organizations as well as two media programs originally created at the American Music Center: NewMusicBox and Counterstream Radio.

== History ==
=== American Music Center ===
The American Music Center (AMC) was a nonprofit organization which aimed to promote the creating, performing, and enjoying new American music. It was founded in 1939 as a membership organization by composers Marion Bauer, Aaron Copland, Howard Hanson, Harrison Kerr, Otto Luening, and Quincy Porter.

For many years the main activity of the center was the accumulation of a library of American music which accepted score submissions from all composers who joined as members. The center's library, which eventually contained over 60,000 individual scores, featured published materials as well as unpublished manuscripts, many of which were unavailable elsewhere. On June 29, 2001, the entire collection was transferred to The New York Public Library for the Performing Arts at Lincoln Center.

In the 1950s, the Center created a landmark program funded by the Ford Foundation, to commission, perform, and record new American orchestral works, which resulted in 18 commissioned orchestral works, 72 performances, 12 recordings, and a Pulitzer Prize for John La Montaine's Concerto for Piano and Orchestra. The works also include Gunther Schuller's Seven Studies on Themes by Paul Klee, which is among the first Third Stream orchestra works. In the early 1960s, the Center initiated its Copying Assistance Program, later renamed the Composer Assistance Program, which gave grants directly to composers to assist in the preparation of performance materials. In subsequent decades, the center established additional grant programs including one which funded the live performance of music at dance presentations as well as programs to support recorded music. For many years the American Music Center ran the grant program of the Aaron Copland Fund.

In 1999, the American Music Center launched the web magazine NewMusicBox, and, in 2007, Counterstream Radio, a 24-hour online station broadcasting music by United States composers. It had grants for composers and ensembles, and offered professional development resources for new music professionals.

For many years, the American Music Center was run by composer Ray Green. Other directors included Margaret Jory, Nancy Clarke, Toni Greenberg, and Richard Kessler. In 2019 Vanessa Reed was appointed as the new president and CEO.

=== Meet The Composer ===
Meet The Composer was a United States organization founded in 1974 by the New York State Council on the Arts. Initially, it was a program at NYSCA called Composer in Performance, after a few years, the Council then asked the American Music Center to take the project over as one of its own program and composer John Duffy was hired as program director. John Duffy then gave it the name: Meet The Composer. In later years, Meet The Composer was spun off by the American Music Center as an independent organization run by John Duffy. It sought to assist composers in making a living through writing music by sponsoring commissioning, residency, education, and audience interaction programs.

Meet The Composer's mission was, "to increase opportunities for composers by fostering the creation, performance, dissemination, and appreciation of their music."

In 2005, Meet The Composer was among 406 New York City arts and social service institutions to receive part of a $20 million grant from the Carnegie Corporation, which was made possible through a donation by New York City mayor Michael Bloomberg.

=== Merger and formation of New Music USA ===
On November 8, 2011, the American Music Center and Meet The Composer merged to form New Music USA, combining the organizations' grantmaking, media, and professional development initiatives under a single nonprofit organization.
