= Stephen McAll =

Scottish songwriter and producer, lead of Constant Follower

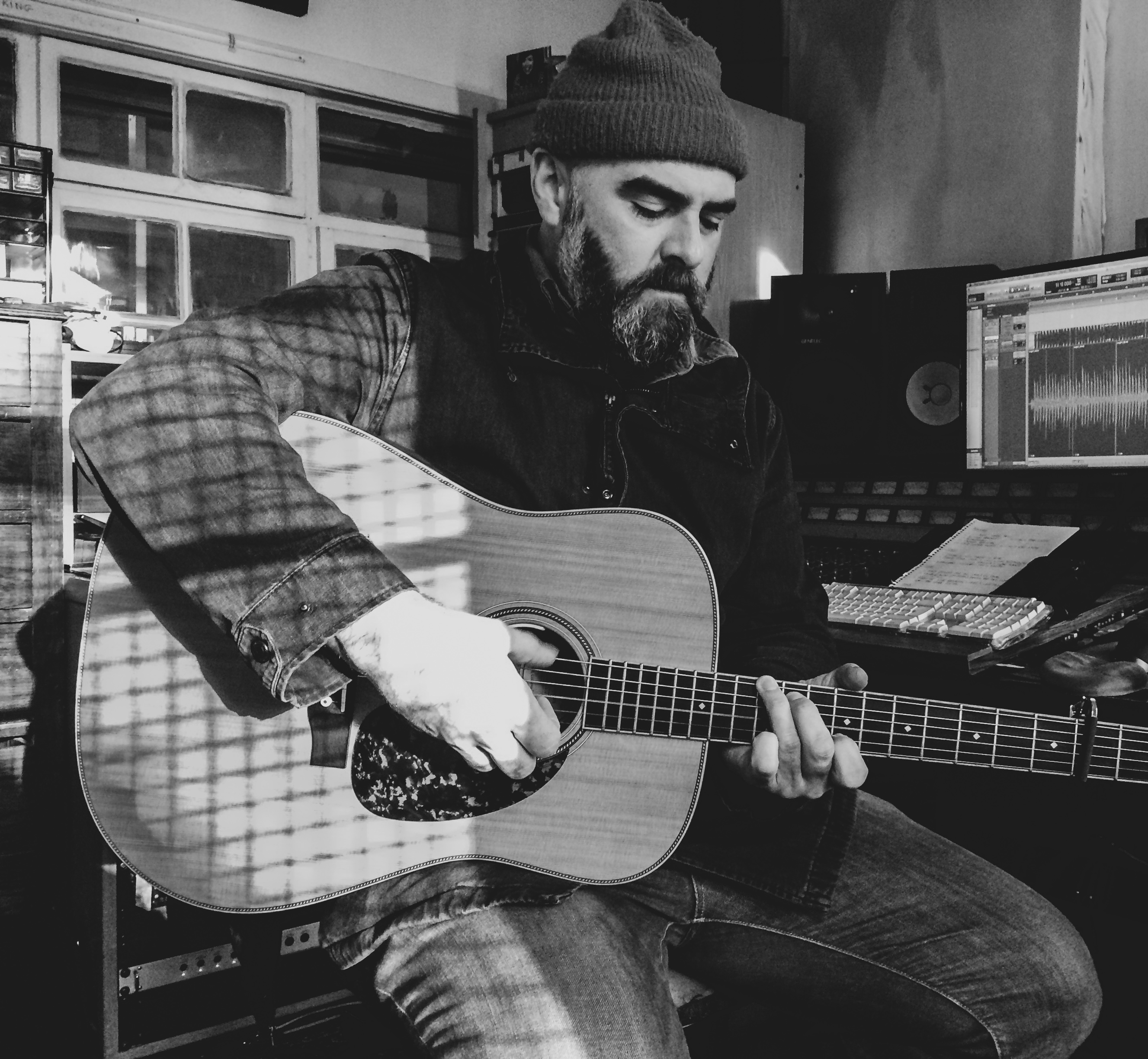
- Stephen McAll at La Chunky Studios 2021
- Born: Glasgow, Scotland
- Occupations: Songwriter, musician, producer
- Years active: 2016–present
- Known for: Lead of Constant Follower
- Notable work: Neither Is Nor ever Was (2021), The Smile You Send Out Returns To You (2025)
- Website: www.constantfollower.com

Stephen McAll is a Scottish songwriter and producer based in Stirling, best known as the lead of the Experimental Folk music project Constant Follower. Under that name his album Neither Is, Nor Ever Was (2021) was shortlisted for the 2022 Scottish Album of the Year Award, and subsequent releases drew international press, further SAY Award nominations and UK chart positions. He is a dual ambassador for the Featured Artists Coalition and Attitude is Everything, advocating for accessibility in the music sector.

== Early life ==
McAll was born in Glasgow and grew up in East Kilbride, later living in Glasgow before settling in Stirling. As a teenager he survived a violent assault that caused severe head injuries leaving him unable to write, read or play guitar, and with long-term memory problems. Accounts differ on his exact age at the time, with reports stating 16 and 17 years old. McAll found his way back to reading after the attack through the poetry of Norman MacCaig.

McAll said his interest in the guitar was sparked by his parents who were listening to bands like The Beatles, The Kinks and Pink Floyd.

== Career ==
McAll formed Constant Follower in Stirling in 2016. The debut album, Neither Is, Nor Ever Was (2021), was released on Shimmy-Disc and received positive coverage in UK media, leading to a 2022 SAY Award shortlist place.

In 2023 McAll and guitarist Scott William Urquhart released the collaborative LP Even Days Dissolve, which reached the 2023 SAY Award Longlist.

His second Constant Follower album, The Smile You Send Out Returns To You (2025), co-produced with Dan Duszynski, entered multiple UK Official charts, including No. 2 in Scotland, No. 1 on the Official Independent Breakers Chart, No. 14 on the Official Albums Sales Chart and No. 10 on the Official Vinyl Albums Chart, and was longlisted for the 2025 SAY Award.

McAll’s interviews cite Scottish poetry, especially Norman MacCaig, and the aesthetics of Talk Talk and Mark Hollis as touch-points for his writing and production approach.

== Advocacy and public work ==
McAll is a dual ambassador for the Featured Artists Coalition and Attitude is Everything through the Next Stage initiative, which campaigns for accessibility and inclusion for Deaf and disabled artists. He has worked with the charity Help Musicians and has discussed recovery, access and artist welfare in media profiles and interviews.

In late 2025, McAll organised an open letter signed by over 300 professional Scottish musicians and industry bodies including the Musicians Union calling on BBC Radio Scotland to pause planned changes to its late-night specialist music programmes which the letter said would harm opportunities for Scottish musicians. In January 2026, The Herald reported that McAll submitted playlist analysis to the Scottish Parliament’s Constitution, Europe, External Affairs and Culture Committee (CEEAC) comparing late-night output from 1 to 15 January 2026 with the same period in 2025 which showed a marked decrease in plays by independent Scottish artists in the new late-night BBC Radio Scotland slots.

On 12 February 2026, The Herald reported that Scottish Culture Secretary Angus Robertson MSP responded to McAll stating that he had written to the BBC to impress upon them that the Scottish Government "echoes the concerns" set out in the letter, and had asked for a meeting at their earliest convenience. The letter stated that it is the clear view of the Scottish Government that "the BBC must fulfil its public service obligations and listen to the views of audiences and artists across Scotland".

McAll has appeared on industry and showcase programmes such as Wide Days and SXSW with Constant Follower, and has spoken at industry conferences including Cambridge Sound and Vision and Resonate.

== Instruments ==
McAll is an official Larrivée Guitars artist. He has told interviewers that acoustic guitar is his primary instrument and described his playing style as being influenced by James Taylor.
