= Heather Nevay =

Scottish painter, illustrator

Heather Nevay is a Scottish painter and illustrator. She was born on January 13, 1965, in Glasgow, Scotland. She possesses an extensive and impressive repertoire of exhibitions of her work in the United Kingdom and some in the United States. She was educated at the Glasgow School of Art and is now part of the Royal Glasgow Institute of the Fine Arts. Her paintings have a very distinctive style, employing the figurative use of color and are reminiscent of classic cinematic horror. They also depict themes such as valiance, frailty, and the constantly changing stability or lack thereof in human relationships.

== Education and professional life ==
Nevay graduated with honors from the Glasgow School of Art in 1988. She earned her Bachelor of Arts degree in Art and Design. After graduating, she participated in the Scotfree Designs Exhibition and Betty Jackson Fashion Show. Then she received several commissions from authors to illustrate their books. Among them were Fergus Lamont by Robin Jenkins, Wild Geese Overhead by Neil Gunn, and Collected Poems by Edwin Muir. Nevay was also commissioned in 2016 by Arts Council England to create The Lesson, which was included in the curated exhibition "Strange Worlds: The Vision of Angela Carter" at the Royal West of England Academy in Bristol.

In the 1990s and early 2000s, Nevay had several part-time art-related jobs. From 1993 to 1995, Nevay taught art classes at the Gartnavel Royal Hospital in Glasgow. From 1993 to 2002, she was a Gallery Assistant at Cyril Gerber Fine Art, also in Glasgow. From 1995 to 1997, she created and ran children's art classes at the Paisley Art Centre. From 1999 to 2009, she was a lecturer in 3D Art Studies, working with children with special needs, at Coatbridge College in North Lanarkshire.

In 2015 Nevay was elected a member of The Royal Glasgow Institute of Fine Arts. She has also won several awards from galleries and museums for her art.

== Exhibitions ==
Nevay's first exhibition was in 1990 at Princes Square in Glasgow. Starting in1992 she became a regularly exhibited artist at the Royal Scottish Academy and the Royal Glasgow Institute of Fine Arts. She continues to exhibit there today. Since she began she has exhibited many times - at least once nearly every year - and has been featured in solo exhibitions, group exhibitions, and curated exhibitions.

== Art style ==
Writer and filmmaker James Burge wrote the following about Nevay's art:

“Heather Nevay’s paintings shock at first sight. She employs a repertoire of images that appear to have found their way to us from Hieronymus Bosch via classic cinematic horror: dogs with human heads, sinister little girls playing with lifelike dolls, a dark woodland teeming with tiny animals in strange clothing. They frequently depict children, surprised in the middle of some incomprehensible ritual, staring out at us with hostility and contempt.”

Many who see Nevay's work are surprised by the dark horror that can be found in it. She herself once cheerfully said that "People who look at my paintings for the first time often think I need psychiatric help." In reality, though, Nevay's paintings depict the scary experience that childhood can be as every child learns about themselves - their mind, their emotions, and their natural human desires. Additionally, her art offers the reminder that childhood is the foundation for adulthood, and every life is lived by learning.
