= Seonna Hong =

American painter (born 1973)

- Born: 1973 (age 52–53); California, U.S.
- Education: California State University, Long Beach
- Occupations: Visual artist, animator
- Known for: Painting, animation backgrounds
- Style: pop surrealism
- Spouse: Tim Biskup (divorced)
- Children: 1
- Website: Official website

Seonna Hong (born 1973) is an American contemporary artist, who works in fine art and animation. Her paintings have appeared in exhibitions in Los Angeles, New York City, and Tokyo, Japan. She is Los Angeles–based.

== Early life and education ==
Born and raised in Southern California, Hong is the daughter of parents who immigrated from Korea. Her father was an architect. As a child, Hong enjoyed drawing cartoon characters like Hello Kitty and Strawberry Shortcake. She graduated from California State University, Long Beach, with a degree in general art. After graduation, she worked as a teacher.

== Career ==
=== Animation ===
Her work as a background painter has appeared in animated series and films, most notably in the Nickelodeon series, My Life as a Teenage Robot, for which she received an Emmy Award in 2003. She worked on The Mighty B! as an art director and background painter from 2008 to 2011.

=== Fine art ===
Hong's inspirations include "the abstract paintings of Helen Frankenthaler, Sonia Delaunay’s vivid use of colors and patterns, and Jackson Pollack’s drip and expressive techniques." She is known for her surreal landscape paintings, which often include small human and animal figures. Her work has frequently been featured in art magazine Juxtapoz.

In 2004 h er first solo show took place in New York at the Oliver Kamm/5BE Gallery, where she exhibited illustrations for her future children's book, Animus. She received the Joan Mitchell Foundation grant in 2006. In 2008, Japanese artist Takashi Murakami picked her as the first American artist to have a solo show at the KaiKai Kiki gallery in Japan. She has since had solo shows at LaBasse Projects in Culver City, Jonathan Levine Gallery in New York, and three at Hashimoto Contemporary in San Francisco.

In 2020, actress Lily Collins mentioned she collects Hong's artwork.

Seonna Hong had a solo show, Murmurations, at NYC Hashimoto Contemporary 2023. Hong's fifth solo exhibition at Hashimoto Contemporary.
