= Music Managers Forum =

Organisation representing music managers

- Industry: Music
- Founded: 1992; 34 years ago
- Headquarters: London, United Kingdom
- Website: www.themmf.net

The Music Managers Forum (MMF) is the world's largest professional membership organisation representing music managers. At present, the MMF membership stands at over 950 managers based in the UK with global businesses and a wider network of 2700 managers in the USA.

== History and governance ==
Founded in 1992 at the In the City conference in Manchester, England, and formally incorporated in January 1993 as The Managers Forum Ltd.

The co-chairs at the time, Diane Wagg and Stephen Budd, appointed Annabella Coldrick as CEO in January 2016. Music Managers Forum appoints new CEO.

Following a change in governance, in July 2017 a round of board elections was held. Designed to increase diversity and inclusivity, the new rules mean the board must rotate annually. Board members are now elected to serve only a fixed three-year term, and at least five members will be required to stand down each year.

During 2017's board elections, Stephen Budd stepped down as co-chair, with Diane Wagg becoming the sole-chair, and Biffy Clyro manager Paul Craig stepping into the newly created role of Vice Chair.

In 2018, Paul Craig was elected by the Board as Chair with Kwame Kwaten as Vice-Chair.

In April 2019, Fiona McGugan was named the MMF's Director of Strategy & Operations. She left the organisation in November 2019 after eight years with the MMF to join law firm Simons, Muirhead & Burton.

In September 2019 Jayne Stynes was appointed General Manager of the MMF. With six years experience at Eleven Management, Stynes has worked extensively on live and recorded campaigns for artists including Damon Albarn, Blur, Gorillaz, The Clash, Spoek Mathambo, Róisín Murphy and Kano.

== Training programmes ==
The MMF runs training programmes, courses, and events designed to educate and inform artist managers.

Courses and events run so far have included the MMF Essentials of Music Management Day course which runs four times a year, the Mechanics of Music Management programme, as well as regular seminars, open meetings, roundtables, and workshops.

== Advocacy ==
MMF represents its members' views through consultations and submissions to Governments, statements within the media, membership of UK Music and dialogue with collecting societies.

The MMF is a founding member of European Music Managers Alliance (EMMA) and the Council of Music Makers (CMM).

Campaigns in which the MMF are currently participating include "Dissecting the Digital Dollar", and tackling Secondary Ticketing through the "FanFair Alliance" campaign.

== Priorities ==
The MMF has defined the organisation's key priorities as:

Educating the world on the role of the music manager: helping people understand the increasingly important role of the manager, how it is changing and what it is managers do. In November 2019 the MMF published Managing Expectations – a new report exploring the evolution of management and management deals.

Professional development: supporting MMF members in developing their knowledge and skills as music managers through formal courses and more focused workshops and seminars.

Investment into Music Industry: encouraging more investment into manager and artists’ businesses, including the MMF Accelerator For Music, Managers Programme, supported by YouTube Music and artist investment opportunities such as labels, distributors, Help Musicians UK, PRS for Music, SME funding and Arts Council grants.

Representation: Campaigning on behalf of MMF members to affect change.

== Artist & Manager Awards ==
Music Managers Forum has partnered with Featured Artists' Coalition to organize an annual ceremony, the Artist & Manager Awards, "to celebrate the achievements of a whole spectrum of artists and managers". Honorary awards include the FanFair Alliance Award. Music funding platform, beatBread, was the headline sponsor of the 2022 awards.
