= Matt Carmichael (jazz musician) =

Scottish jazz saxophonist

- Origin: Lenzie, East Dunbartonshire, Scotland
- Genres: Jazz, folk jazz
- Instrument: Tenor saxophone

Matt Carmichael is a Scottish jazz saxophonist known for his albums Where Will the River Flow and Marram.

== Early life and education ==
Born in the Scottish Highlands, Carmichael began playing saxophone at the age of 11. Carmichael played in the East Dunbartonshire School's Jazz Orchestra and Tommy Smith Youth Jazz Orchestra before enrolling at the Royal Conservatoire of Scotland.

== Career ==
Carmichael won the Peter Whittingham Jazz Award in 2019 and was a finalist in the 2020 BBC Young Jazz Musician competition. His style has been described as a combination of lyrical jazz and folk jazz. Carmichael is signed to Edition Records. He released his first album, Where Will the River Flow, in 2021. His second album, Marram, was released in 2022.
