= Featured Artists' Coalition =

The Featured Artists Coalition (FAC) is a nonprofit organisation set up to protect the rights of featured musical artists, particularly in the new digital age. It encourages a greater connection between fans and artists and aims to promote transparency in the music industry specifically to the benefit of the artists themselves.

It is a UK based organization, founded in early 2009, lobbying and campaigning for the rights of featured artists (i.e. 'the musicians and bands whose names are on the cover of the record' as distinct from session musicians). It was formed by a number of high-profile artists as a reaction to the conventional stance by the music industry that saw artists as not constituting an organised body and so often not possessing direct control over their own work.

The FAC's aim is to not only promote the rights of established artists, but also to support those of the up-and-coming featured artists and young emerging acts who are not familiar with the industry or their own rights. The FAC aims to provide a direct campaigning voice for featured artists, both established and new, on commercial issues (such as the deals done between major content providers and record labels) and policy issues (such as copyright term extension and anti piracy measures).

== Membership ==
The directors of the board include Billy Bragg, Dave Rowntree of Blur, Nick Mason of Pink Floyd, Ed O'Brien of Radiohead, Kate Nash, Hal Ritson of The Young Punx, Howard Jones, Mark Kelly of Marillion, Sandie Shaw, Master Shortie, Lucy Pullin of The Fire Escapes, Ross Millard of The Futureheads, Fran Healy of Travis, Crispin Hunt of Longpigs, Rumer, Paul Pacifico, Roxanne de Bastion and Annie Lennox.

Membership of the FAC is broad and includes featured artists such as Tom Jones, Robbie Williams, Little Boots, Badly Drawn Boy, Sia, Amy Studt, The Boxer Rebellion, Kevin Hewick and many others.

== Changing Industry ==
In the past it was normal that the musical artist would sign away their rights to a record company for a contracted number of years and/or albums. This resulted in the record label having almost complete control over the artist and their promotion for the duration of the contract. However, since the recent and sudden impact of the digital age on music and on the distribution of music, artists have not only come closer to their audience, but further from the profit due to their lack of representation at the negotiating table. Because of this inequality, FAC has tried to ensure that featured musical artists are central in these deals and receive a fair share of the profits.

Bands such as Marillion and Radiohead paved the way for such thinking. In 1999, Marillion decided to turn down offers of a recording contract with an independent label and contacted their fans by email to ask them if they would be prepared to pay for the band's next album in advance. This successful venture enabled the band to retain the rights to their own music instead of being forced to surrender their rights to a label in the traditional way. Radiohead released their 2007 album In Rainbows as an online digital download and let fans choose how much to pay for it. However, despite the vast sums of money being made by websites such as iTunes Store and Myspace, the artists themselves receive little or none of the revenues. This provided incentive for the formation of FAC to help reshape the organisation of the music industry and provide a means for featured musical artists to profit directly from their own work.

Against the backdrop of dramatic falls in record sales in recent years this is seen as a crucial means by which artists can potentially make a living off their own work and create viable policies for the future of the industry. Equally, FAC has stressed the importance of not criminalising the ordinary fan for digital downloads and instead would rather focus developing alternative forms of revenue.

== Campaign stance and key demands ==
The FAC has taken a markedly different stance from the 'traditional music industry' on several key issues such as copyright term extension and, in particular, online piracy where the FAC has argued against 'criminalizing fans' through prosecuting not for profit file sharing of music.

It lists the following six as its key demands:

- "An agreement by the music industry that artists should receive fair compensation whenever their business partners receive an economic return from the exploitation of the artists' work."
- "All transfers of copyright should be by license rather than by assignment."
- "The 'making available' right should be monetized on behalf of featured artists and all other performers."
- "Copyright owners to be obliged to follow a 'use it or lose it' approach to the copyrights they control."
- "The rights for performers should be improved to bring them more into line with those granted to authors (songwriters, lyricists and composers)."
- "A change to copyright law which will end the commercial exploitation of unlicensed music purporting to be used in conjunction with 'critical reviews' and abusing the UK provisions for 'fair dealing'."

It has also worked in concert with the British Academy of Songwriters, Composers and Authors and the Music Producers Guild in campaigns to protect rights of performers and musicians and for "artists to have more control of their music and a much fairer share of the profits".

== Events ==
The FAC was launched at Heaven on 11 March 2009. On 24 September 2009, an open meeting for featured artists was held at Air Studios. The inaugural Artist and Manager Awards was held in conjunction with the MMF at the Roundhouse in London's Chalk Farm on 13 September 2011, at which Ed Sheeran and Mumford & Sons performed. Massive Attack won the Artists' Artist Award, Ed Sheeran won the Award for Breakthrough Artist and Everybody's Management and its artists won the Achievement Award, the highest accolade of the night.

The Artist and Manager Awards 2012 was held at the Troxy on 27 November 2013. Winners included Amanda Palmer for Industry Pioneer and Zane Lowe for Industry Champion. Artist awards were given to Madeon and Plan B and Ben Howard's manager, Owain Davies was awarded the Breakthrough Manager award.

Spotify sponsored the event and awarded a ten thousand pound grant to a promising artist and manager partnership. The winners were manager Danny Blackman and act, Pale Seas.
