= Creative Europe =

Cultural organization based in Europe

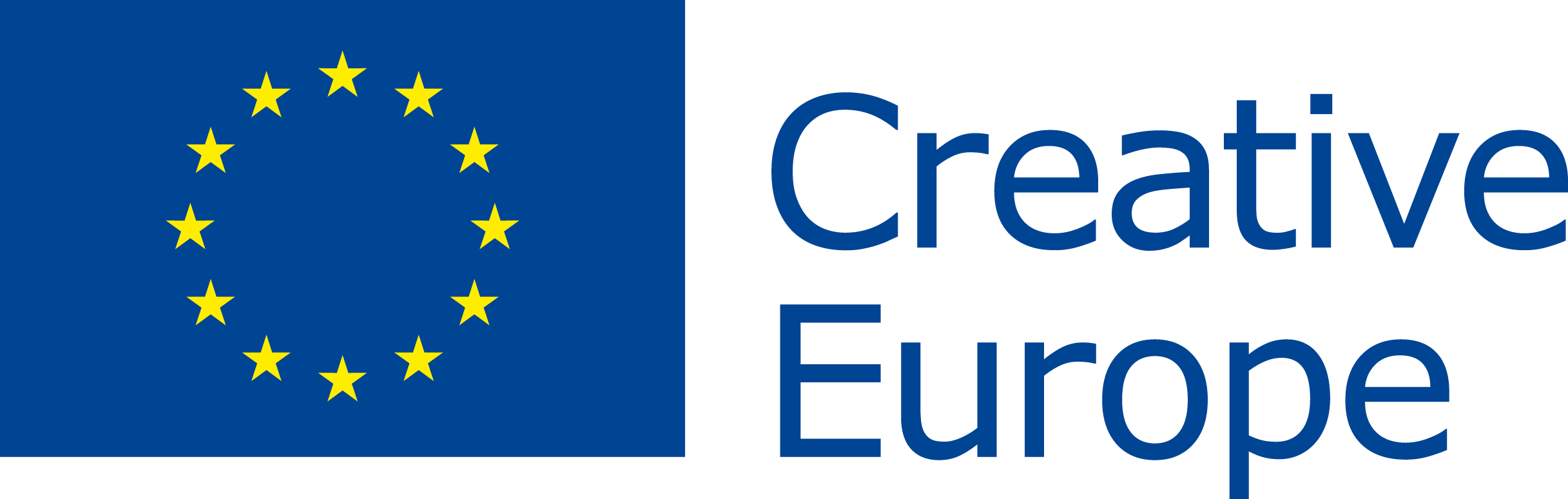
- Type: Incentive
- Industry: Bank
- Founded: 2012
- Headquarters: City of Brussels, Belgium
- Parent: Independent (2012–2013); European Union (2013–present)

Creative Europe is a European Union programme for the cultural and creative sectors. In its first phase, going from 2014 to 2020, it had a budget of €1.47 billion, which were expanded to €2.44 billion in its second phase (2021–2027).

== History ==
The programme was approved by the European Parliament on 19 November 2013 and adopted by the European Council on 3 December 2013. It came into force on 1 January 2014. A total of 650 of the Members of the European Parliament (MEPs) voted in favour of the programme, with 32 against and 10 abstaining.

In November 2020, the programme was renewed for another seven years (2021-2027) and its budget increased to 2.2 billion.

Membership in the programme has been extended to the EU's Eastern Partnership member states. As of 2022, Armenia, Georgia, Moldova, and Ukraine have joined Creative Europe.

== Programme details ==
The general objectives of Creative Europe are: (a) to safeguard, develop and promote European cultural and linguistic diversity and to promote Europe's cultural heritage; (b) to strengthen the competitiveness of the European cultural and creative sectors, in particular of the audiovisual sector, with a view to promoting smart, sustainable and inclusive growth.

Creative Europe encompasses the EU's previous Culture and MEDIA Programmes which have been in effect for more than 20 years. These strands now serve as sub-programmes under Creative Europe, with the Culture sub-programme supporting performing and visual arts, heritage and other areas, and the MEDIA sub-programme providing funding for the cinema and audiovisual sector. In addition, there is a new cross-sectoral strand supporting policy cooperation, transversal measures and a new financial guarantee facility, which will be operational from 2016.

Programmes that existed under the Culture and MEDIA strands, such as the European Capitals of Culture, European Heritage Label, European Heritage Days and the five European prizes (EU Prize for Cultural Heritage/Europa Nostra Awards, EU Prize for Contemporary Architecture, EU Prize for Literature, European Border Breakers Awards, and EU Prix MEDIA) continue to operate under Creative Europe. Also the project Re-Imagine Europe, which was initiated by Sonic Acts, is co-funded by Creative Europe.

== Funding ==
Creative Europe had a budget of €1.46 billion for its first seven years (2014 to 2020), which was increased to € 2.44 billion in its current, second phase (2021-2027). In its first phase, the programme has set aside funding for 250,000 artists and cultural professionals, 2,000 cinemas, 800 films and 4,500 literary translations,

The programme will allocate at least 56% of its budget to the MEDIA sub-programme for audiovisual and the cinema and at least 31% to the Culture sub-programme for performing and visual arts. This broadly reflects the share of funding that the two areas previously received.

A maximum of 13% of the budget will be allocated to new cross-sectoral strand, which includes funding the new Creative Europe Desks and supporting the financial guarantee facility which is set to come into operation from 2016. The programme will also launch a new financial guarantee facility enabling small cultural and creative businesses to access up to €750 million in bank loans. This guarantee will operate from 2016 and target small and mid-sized enterprises (SMEs), will share the risk on loans offered to them by banks.

== See also ==
- Creative Europe–Armenia
