= Del Amitri discography =

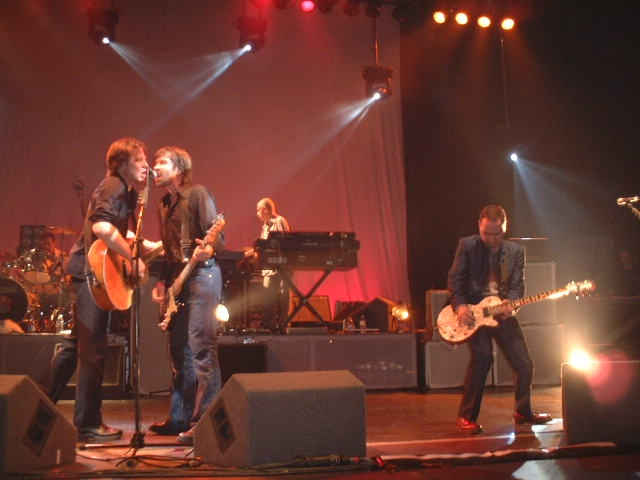
- Studio albums: 7
- Live albums: 1
- Compilation albums: 3
- Singles: 24

The discography of Del Amitri, a Scottish pop rock band formed in 1983, includes seven studio albums, one live album, three compilation albums and 24 singles. Five of their studio albums reached the top 10 in the UK Albums Chart.

Their first album, which is a self-title album released in May 1985 did not enter the UK Albums Chart at all, and their final studio album Fatal Mistakes, released in May 2021, peaked at number 5. The band's most successful studio album was their third Change Everything, which reached second place in the UK Albums Chart. Also the band's compilation album, Hatful of Rain: The Best of Del Amitri, got to fifth place in the UK Albums Chart. The band broke up in 2002. They played a reunion gig at The Hydro Glasgow on 24 January 2014. A live album, Into the Mirror, recorded on the reunion tour in January and February 2014 was released on 20 October 2014.

The band reunited in 2020 and recorded their seventh studio album, Fatal Mistakes, which was released in May 2021.

== Studio albums ==
Title	Album details	Peak chart positions									Certifications
Title	Album details	SCO	AUS	CAN	EUR	GER	SWE	SWI	UK	US	Certifications
Del Amitri	Released: 6 May 1985; Label: Chrysalis (#CHR1499)	—	—	—	—	—	—	—	—	—	
Waking Hours	Released: 10 July 1989; Label: A&M (#AMA9006)	—	8	66	59	—	40	—	6	95	ARIA: Platinum; BPI: Platinum
Change Everything	Released: 1 June 1992; Label: A&M (#3953852)	—	24	—	17	86	34	37	2	178	BPI: Gold
Twisted	Released: 28 February 1995; Label: A&M (#5403112)	2	44	—	15	69	41	36	3	170	BPI: Gold
Some Other Sucker's Parade	Released: 24 June 1997; Label: A&M (#5407052)	5	—	—	51	81	51	46	6	160	
Can You Do Me Good?	Released: 8 April 2002; Label: Mercury (#4932162)	12	—	—	—	89	—	74	30	—	
Fatal Mistakes	Released: 14 May 2021; Label: Cooking Vinyl	2	—	—	—	34	—	—	5	—	
"—" denotes items that did not chart or were not released in that territory.

== Live albums ==
Title	Album details	Peak chart positions				
Title	Album details	SCO	UK	UK Indie	UK Phys.	UK Update
Into the Mirror	Released: 20 October 2014; Label: HTAW (#HTAW001)	28	75	15	51	29

== Compilation albums ==
Title	Album details	Peak chart positions				Certifications
Title	Album details	SCO	EUR	IRE	UK	Certifications
Hatful of Rain: The Best of	Released: September 1998; Label: A&M (#540940-2)	1	56	71	5	BPI: Platinum
Lousy with Love: The B-Sides	Released: September 1998; Label: A&M (#540941-2)	15	—	—	—	
The Collection	Released: 16 October 2007; Label: Spectrum (#530 2790)	—	—	—	—	
"—" denotes items that did not chart or were not released in that territory.

== Singles ==
Year	Title	Peak chart positions										Album
Year	Title	SCO	AUS	CAN	EUR	GER	IRE	NED	POR	UK	US	Album
1985	"Sticks and Stones Girl"	—	—	—	—	—	—	—	—	—	—	Del Amitri
1985	"Hammering Heart"	—	—	—	—	—	—	—	—	—	—	Del Amitri
1989	"Kiss This Thing Goodbye"	—	28	—	—	—	—	—	—	59	—	Waking Hours
1989	"Stone Cold Sober"	—	50	—	—	—	—	—	—	90	—	Waking Hours
1990	"Nothing Ever Happens"	—	46	—	29	—	4	58	—	11	—	Waking Hours
1990	"Kiss This Thing Goodbye" (re-release)	—	—	30	—	—	—	—	—	43	35	Waking Hours
1990	"Move Away Jimmy Blue"	—	—	—	88	—	—	—	—	36	—	Waking Hours
1990	"Spit in the Rain"	—	118	—	72	—	—	—	10	21	—	Non-album single
1992	"Always the Last to Know"	—	39	22	48	56	21	—	—	13	30	Change Everything
1992	"Be My Downfall"	—	86	43	83	—	—	62	—	30	—	Change Everything
1992	"Just Like a Man"	—	73	—	64	—	—	—	—	25	—	Change Everything
1993	"When You Were Young"	—	—	—	54	—	—	—	—	20	—	Change Everything
1995	"Here and Now"	8	—	—	98	—	—	—	—	21	—	Twisted
1995	"Driving with the Brakes On"	6	—	—	88	—	—	—	—	18	—	Twisted
1995	"Roll to Me"	10	—	5	—	—	—	—	—	22	10	Twisted
1995	"Tell Her This"	16	—	—	—	—	—	—	—	32	—	Twisted
1997	"Not Where It's At"	6	—	17	—	—	—	—	—	21	—	Some Other Sucker's Parade
1997	"What I Think She Sees"	—	—	29	—	—	—	—	—	—	—	Some Other Sucker's Parade
1997	"Some Other Sucker's Parade"	26	—	—	—	—	—	—	—	46	—	Some Other Sucker's Parade
1998	"Don't Come Home Too Soon"	1	—	—	82	—	—	—	—	15	—	Music of the World Cup: Allez! Ola! Ole!
1998	"Cry to Be Found"	22	—	—	—	—	—	—	—	40	—	Hatful of Rain
2002	"Just Before You Leave"	28	—	—	—	—	—	—	—	37	—	Can You Do Me Good?
2020	"Close Your Eyes and Think of England"	—	—	—	—	—	—	—	—	—	—	Fatal Mistakes
2021	"It's Feelings"	—	—	—	—	—	—	—	—	—	—	Fatal Mistakes
2021	"You Can't Go Back"	—	—	—	—	—	—	—	—	—	—	Fatal Mistakes
2021	"All Hail Blind Love"	—	—	—	—	—	—	—	—	—	—	Fatal Mistakes
"—" denotes items that did not chart or were not released in that territory.

== Music videos ==
- “Hammering Heart” (1985)
- "Sticks and Stones, Girl" (1985)
- “Kiss This Thing Goodbye”(1989)
- “Stone Cold Sober” (1989)
- “Nothing Ever Happens” (1989)
- ”Always the Last to Know” (1992)
- ”Driving with the Brakes On” (1995)
- ”Here and Now” (1995)
- ”Roll to Me” (1996)
- ”Not Where It’s At” (1997)
- ”Some Other Sucker's Parade” (1997)
- ”Cry to Be Found” (1998)
- ”Don't Come Home Too Soon” (1998)
- ”It's Feelings” (2021)
