= Hatful of Rain (album) =

Greatest hits album by Del Amitri
- Released: September 1998
- Recorded: 1989–98
- Genre: Alternative rock
- Length: 67:07
- Label: A&M
- Producer: various

Del Amitri chronology
Some Other Sucker's Parade (1997)	Hatful of Rain (1998)	Can You Do Me Good? (2002)

Singles from Hatful of Rain
- 1. "Cry to Be Found" Released: August 1998

Hatful of Rain (The Best of Del Amitri) is the first compilation album by Scottish alternative rock band Del Amitri, released in September 1998 by A&M Records. It consists of all the band's British singles released between 1989 and 1998, including the non-album singles "Spit in the Rain" and "Don't Come Home Too Soon", and a new track "Cry to Be Found".

== Trivia ==
The single "Don't Come Home Too Soon" was the Official Team Scotland Song for the 1998 FIFA World Cup.

== Critical reception ==
Professional ratings
Review scores
Source	Rating
AllMusic	4.5/5 stars
Encyclopedia of Popular Music	4/5 stars
The Great Rock Discography	8/10

AllMusic's Stephen Thomas Erlewine called Hatful of Rain "an excellent overview of Del Amitri's career", writing, "It may overlook their early independent singles, yet the consistency of their major-label work in the '80s and '90s gives the collection a sense of cohesion, even if it is sequenced out of chronological order. What matters is that Hatful of Rain contains everything that a casual fan could want while reconfirming their stature as a solid singles band to their core constituents."

== Track listing ==
All songs written by Justin Currie, except where noted.

No.	Title	Writer(s)	Original album	Length
1.	"Cry to Be Found"	Currie; Iain Harvie	New track	4:05
2.	"Roll to Me"		Twisted, 1995	2:12
3.	"Kiss This Thing Goodbye"	Currie; Harvie; Mick Slaven	Waking Hours, 1989	4:28
4.	"Not Where It's At"		Some Other Sucker's Parade, 1997	3:41
5.	"Nothing Ever Happens"		Waking Hours	3:51
6.	"Always the Last to Know"		Change Everything, 1992	4:17
7.	"Here and Now"	Currie; Harvie	Twisted	5:18
8.	"Just Like a Man"	Currie; Harvie	Change Everything	5:02
9.	"Spit in the Rain"		Non-album single, 1990	3:41
10.	"When You Were Young"		Change Everything	4:03
11.	"Driving with the Brakes On"		Twisted	4:34
12.	"Stone Cold Sober"		Waking Hours	4:59
13.	"Tell Her This"		Twisted	3:13
14.	"Move Away Jimmy Blue"	Currie; Harvie	Waking Hours	3:39
15.	"Be My Downfall"		Change Everything	3:30
16.	"Some Other Sucker's Parade"	Currie; Jon McLoughlin	Some Other Sucker's Parade	3:12
17.	"Don't Come Home Too Soon"		Music of the World Cup: Allez! Ola! Ole!, 1998	3:22

Special edition bonus CD

Live at Abbey Road
No.	Title	Writer(s)	Length
1.	"Just Like a Man" (live)	Currie; Harvie	4:55
2.	"Not Where It's At" (live)		3:43
3.	"Always the Last to Know" (live)		4:34
4.	"Here And Now" (live)	Currie; Harvie	5:37
5.	"Move Away Jimmy Blue" (live)	Currie; Harvie	5:05
6.	"Nothing Ever Happens" (live)		4:07
7.	"Ace of Spades" (live)	Ian Kilmister; Edward Clarke; Philip Taylor	3:24

== Personnel ==
Credits adapted from the album liner notes.

Del Amitri

- Justin Currie – vocals, bass
- Iain Harvie – guitar
- Kris Dollimore – guitar
- Andy Alston – keyboards
- Mark Price – drums
- Mick Slaven – guitar (3, 12, 14), mandolin (5)
- David Cummings – guitar (2, 6–11)
- Jon McLoughlin – guitar (4, 16)
- Paul Tyagi – drums (14), percussion (3, 5)
- Brian McDermott – drums (6, 8–10, 15)
- Chris Sharrock – drums (2, 7, 11)
- Ash Soan – drums (4, 16)

Additional musicians

- David McCluskey – hammered dulcimer (9), bodhrán (13)
- Bobsy Mullen – bagpipe chanter (9)
- Nick Clark – bass (10)

Technical

- Kevin Bacon – producer (1)
- Jonathan Quarmby – producer (1)
- Al Clay – producer (2, 7, 11, 13), engineer (2, 7, 9, 11, 13)
- Mark Freegard – producer, engineer (3, 4, 12, 16), additional recording (5, 14)
- Hugh Jones – producer, engineer (5)
- Gil Norton – producer, engineer (6, 8–10, 14, 15)
- Pete Smith – producer (17), engineer, mixing (live at Abbey Road)
- Ben Darlow – engineer (17, live at Abbey Road)
- Bob Clearmountain – mixing (2, 7, 11, 13)
- Julian Mendelsohn – mixing (3, 5, 12, 14)
- David Bianco – mixing (4, 16)
- Dave Bascombe – mixing (6)
- Jonathan Glynn-Smith – photography
- Peacock – design

== Charts ==
Chart performance for Hatful of Rain
Chart (1998)	Peak position
European Top 100 Albums	56
Irish Albums	71
Scottish Albums	1
UK Albums Chart	5

== Certifications ==
Region	Certification	Certified units/sales
United Kingdom (BPI)	Platinum	300,000^{*}
^{*} Sales figures based on certification alone.
