= Lousy with Love =

Compilation album by Del Amitri
- Released: September 1998
- Recorded: 1989–1998
- Genre: Alternative rock
- Length: 52:40
- Label: A&M
- Producer: The Groovey Tubes; Mark Freegard; Al Clay; David Kershenbaum

Del Amitri chronology
Hatful of Rain (The Best of Del Amitri) (1998)	Lousy with Love (1998)	Can You Do Me Good? (2002)

Professional ratings
Review scores
Source	Rating
AllMusic	3/5 stars
Encyclopedia of Popular Music	3/5 stars

Lousy with Love (The B-Sides) is a compilation album by Scottish alternative rock band Del Amitri, released in September 1998. It is a collection of B-sides released between 1989 and 1998, featuring tracks not included on Del Amitri's studio albums. It was released in parallel with the best of album Hatful of Rain.

== Track listing ==
All tracks are written by Justin Currie, except where noted.

No.	Title	Writer(s)	Original single	Length
1.	"Scared to Live"	Currie; Iain Harvie	"Just Like a Man", 1992	4:50
2.	"The Return of Maggie Brown"		"Stone Cold Sober", 1989	3:45
3.	"In the Frame"		"Roll to Me", 1995	3:48
4.	"Sleep Instead of Teardrops"		"Not Where It's At", 1997	4:31
5.	"Long Journey Home"		"When You Were Young", 1993	4:11
6.	"Paper Thin (Ambient Mix)"		"Don't Come Home Too Soon", 1998	3:30
7.	"The Last Love Song"		"Tell Her This", 1995	3:42
8.	"The Verb to Do"		"When You Were Young"	2:40
9.	"In the Meantime"		"Driving with the Brakes On", 1995	5:48
10.	"Long Way Down"		"Here and Now", 1995	3:29
11.	"Whiskey Remorse"		"Be My Downfall", 1992	3:13
12.	"Before the Evening Steals the Afternoon"		"Not Where It's At"	2:43
13.	"So Many Souls to Change"		"Nothing Ever Happens", 1989	3:54
98.	"The Whole World is Quiet"		"Always the Last to Know", 1992	2:36

Note

- Tracks 14–97 each consist of 13 seconds of silence; track 98 is unlisted.

== Personnel ==
Del Amitri (1989–1998)

- Justin Currie – vocals, bass
- Iain Harvie – guitar
- Mick Slaven – guitar
- David Cummings – guitar
- Jon McLoughlin – guitar
- Kris Dollimore – guitar
- Andy Alston – keyboards
- Paul Tyagi – drums
- Brian McDermott – drums
- Chris Sharrock – drums
- Ash Soan – drums
- Mark Price – drums

Technical

Credits adapted from the album liner notes, except where noted.

- The Groovey Tubes – producer (1, 3, 5–13, 98)
- David Kershenbaum – producer (2)
- Mark Freegard – producer (4, 6)
- Al Clay – producer (9, 10), mixing (3, 10, 12)
- Kenny Patterson – engineer (1, 5, 7, 8, 11, 98)
- Kenny MacDonald – engineer (13)
- David Bianco – mixing (4, 6)
- Julian Mendelsohn – mixing (2)
