= What Is Love For =

Studio album by Justin Currie
- Released: 2007
- Genre: Rock
- Length: 44:20
- Label: Rykodisc
- Producer: Mark Freegard

Justin Currie chronology
What Is Love For (2007)	The Great War (2010)

Professional ratings
Review scores
Source	Rating
AllMusic	3.5/5 stars

What Is Love For is the first solo album by singer/songwriter Justin Currie, best known for his involvement in the band Del Amitri.

== Track listing ==
All songs written by Justin Currie.

1. "What Is Love For?" – 3:10
2. "Not So Sentimental Now" – 2:57
3. "Walking Through You" – 3:26
4. "Something in That Mess" – 3:06
5. "If I Ever Loved You" – 4:30
6. "Only Love" – 3:15
7. "Gold Dust" – 3:17
8. "Out of My Control" – 3:42
9. "Where Did I Go?" – 3:48
10. "Still in Love" – 3:58
11. "No, Surrender" – 7:40
12. "In the Rain" (hidden track) – 1:31

== Personnel ==
- Jim McDermott – drums, percussion
- Iain Harvie – acoustic guitar, pedal steel
- Mark Price – drums
- Andy Alston – organ
- Chris Cruikshank – saxophone
- Mick Slaven – guitar
- Nick Clark – bass
- Garry John Kane – bass
- Ross McFarlane – drums
- Andy May – organ, clavinet
- Stuart Nisbet – guitar
- Catriona McKay – harp
- Fergus Kerr – French horn
