= The Great War (Justin Currie album) =

Studio album by Justin Currie
- Released: 2010
- Genre: Rock
- Length: 42:56
- Label: Rykodisc
- Producer: Mark Freegard

Justin Currie chronology
What is Love For (2007)	The Great War (2010)	Lower Reaches (2013)

Professional ratings
Review scores
Source	Rating
AllMusic	4/5 stars

The Great War is the second solo album by singer/songwriter Justin Currie, best known for his involvement in the band Del Amitri.

== Track listing ==
All songs written by Justin Currie.

1. "A Man with Nothing To Do" – 3:34
2. "Anywhere I'm Away from You" – 4:09
3. "At Home Inside of Me" – 2:32
4. "You'll Always Walk Alone" – 2:55
5. "Can't Let Go of Her Now" – 3:46
6. "The Fight to be Human" – 8:17
7. "Ready to Be" – 4:02
8. "The Way That It Falls" – 2:44
9. "As Long As You Don't Come Back" – 2:45
10. "Everyone I Love" – 4:07
11. "Baby, You Survived" – 4:05
12. "In My Heart, The War Goes On (Bonus Track)" – 3:09
13. "The Darkness of the Day (Bonus Track)" – 2:28
14. "What You're Looking At (Bonus Track)" – 3:48

== Personnel ==
- Justin Currie – vocals, acoustic guitar, bass, piano, organ
- Jim McDermott – drums, percussion
- Nick Clark – bass, backing vocals
- Mick Slaven – electric guitar, banjo
- Stuart Nisbet – acoustic and electric guitar, pedal steel
- Peter Adams – piano, electric piano, organ, optigan
- Andy May – organ, piano, backing vocals
- Andrew Berridge – viola
- Cheryl Crockett – violin
- Donald Gillan – cello
- Liza Johnson – violin
- Robin Panter – viola
- Alastair Savage – violin
