= A Terrible Beauty (The Uncle Devil Show album) =

Studio album by The Uncle Devil Show
- Released: April 2004
- Recorded: The Fruity Hitler Rooms, Glasgow
- Genre: Pop
- Label: P3 Music
- Producer: The Uncle Devil Show

A Terrible Beauty is the first, and so far only, release from UK band The Uncle Devil Show, a band consisting of Justin Currie, lead singer of Del Amitri, with Jim McDermott of Simple Minds, and his brother, singer Kevin McDermott. It was released on P3 Music in 2004.

== Track listing ==
All tracks are credited pseudonymously to "Herring/Barr" except for "Angie Baby", a cover of the Helen Reddy hit, written by Alan O'Day.

1. "Leonardo's Bicycle"
2. "Gilbert O'Sullivan"
3. "Tambourine"
4. "Bimbo in the Limo"
5. "Plus Ça Change"
6. "Angie Baby"
7. "She Cuts Her Own Fringe"
8. "Strange Umbrella"
9. "Dandelion"
10. "Sidelong Glances of a Pigeon Kicker"
11. "When Raymond Comes Around"
12. "I Had a Drink About You Last Night"

== Production ==
A Terrible Beauty was produced by The Uncle Devil Show and mastered by Paul McGeechan.

== Reviews ==
Reviewer John Murphy of MusicOMH praised the album for its humor, saying it rewarded multiple listenings. Andy Morten of Shindig! magazine also praised the album and noted that its use of profanity was frequent and effective.
