= Some Other Sucker's Parade =

Studio album by Del Amitri
- Released: 24 June 1997
- Recorded: November 1996–January 1997
- Studios: The Chapel, Lincolnshire; Parkgate Studios, Catsfield
- Genre: Alternative rock
- Length: 50:13
- Label: A&M
- Producer: Mark Freegard

Del Amitri chronology
Twisted (1995)	Some Other Sucker's Parade (1997)	Hatful of Rain (1998)

Singles from Some Other Sucker's Parade
- 1. "Not Where It's At" Released: June 1997; 2. "Some Other Sucker's Parade" Released: November 1997

Professional ratings
Review scores
Source	Rating
AllMusic	3/5 stars
Encyclopedia of Popular Music	4/5 stars
Entertainment Weekly	B+
The Great Rock Discography	5/10

Some Other Sucker's Parade is the fifth studio album by Del Amitri, released on 24 June 1997 by A&M Records. It reached number 6 in the UK Albums Chart.

== Background ==
The album's recording was characterised by changes in personnel. Drummer Ashley Soan had joined the band soon after the release of Twisted (1995), and following their 1995 US tour the group parted company with guitarist David Cummings, who left to become a television scriptwriter. Jon McLoughlin was drafted in to replace him, and would co-write Some Other Sucker's Parade's title track with singer/bassist Justin Currie. Both Soan and McLoughlin left soon after the album's recording.

Intended to communicate the band's live sound, the album deliberately used few studio effects in favour of a "raw" feel. "Absolutely as few overdubs as possible," confirmed guitarist Iain Harvie in an October 1997 interview with Guitarist magazine. "Probably about 80 per cent of the songs on this record don't have overdubs, apart from the vocals obviously, with all the harmonies, and maybe the guitar solo if there was a really dreadful mistake in the middle that we just couldn't live with. Wherever possible, we recorded with our live format of bass, drums, two guitars and keyboards for most of the songs."

"Medicine" was slated for a release as the album's second single in September 1997, but was canceled following the death of Princess Diana, due to the lyrics' fleeting mention of a "wreckage".

== Track listing ==
All tracks are written by Justin Currie, except where noted.

No.	Title	Writer(s)	Length
1.	"Not Where It's At"		3:39
2.	"Some Other Sucker's Parade"	Currie; Jon McLoughlin	3:08
3.	"Won't Make It Better"	Currie; Iain Harvie	3:59
4.	"What I Think She Sees"		2:59
5.	"Medicine"		2:50
6.	"High Times"	Currie; Harvie	4:26
7.	"Mother Nature's Writing"	Currie; Harvie	3:50
8.	"No Family Man"		2:54
9.	"Cruel Light of Day"		3:13
10.	"Funny Way to Win"	Currie; Harvie	3:36
11.	"Through All That Nothing"	Currie; Harvie	3:55
12.	"Life Is Full"		3:22
13.	"Lucky Guy"	Currie; Harvie	4:54
14.	"Make It Always Be Too Late"		3:22

Australian and Japanese bonus tracks
No.	Title	Length
15.	"Sleep Instead of Teardrops" (B-side to "Not Where It's At")	4:31
16.	"Paper Thin (Ambient Mix)" (B-side to "Don't Come Home Too Soon")	3:30

== Personnel ==
Credits adapted from the album liner notes.

Del Amitri

- Justin Currie – vocals, bass
- Iain Harvie – guitar, bass on "Medicine" and "Life Is Full"
- Jon McLoughlin – guitar
- Andy Alston – keyboard
- Ash Soan – drums, percussion

Additional musicians

- The London Session Orchestra – strings on "Some Other Sucker's Parade" and "What I Think She Sees"
- Jamie Seyberth – whistle on "Funny Way To Win"
- Will Malone – string arrangements on "Some Other Sucker's Parade" and "What I Think She Sees", brass arrangement on "Make It Always Be Too Late"

Technical

- Mark Freegard – producer, engineer
- David Bianco – mixing (at Larrabee Sound Studios, Hollywood, Los Angeles)
- Michael Nash Associates – design
- Mario Sorrenti – photography

== Charts ==
Chart performance for Some Other Sucker's Parade
Chart (1997)	Peak position
European Top 100 Albums	51
German Albums	81
Scottish Albums	5
Swedish Albums	51
Swiss Albums	46
UK Albums Chart	6
US Billboard 200	160
