= Del Amitri (album) =

Studio album by Del Amitri
- Released: 6 May 1985
- Studios: Park Lane Studio, Glasgow (Mixed at The Garden, London)
- Genres: Post-punk; new wave; folk rock; country folk
- Length: 33:15
- Label: Chrysalis
- Producer: Hugh Jones

Del Amitri chronology
Del Amitri (1985)	Waking Hours (1989)

Singles from Del Amitri
- 1. "Sticks and Stones, Girl" Released: July 1985; 2. "Hammering Heart (rerecorded version)" Released: September 1985

Del Amitri (stylised as del Amitri) is the debut album by the Scottish rock band Del Amitri, released in May 1985 by Chrysalis Records.

Two singles were released, "Sticks and Stones, Girl" (with B-side "The King Is Poor" and "The Difference Is" as an additional track on the 12-inch) and a rerecorded version of "Hammering Heart" (with B-side "Lines Running North" along with a live version of "Brown Eyed Girl" on the 12-inch). Neither single charted. A CD reissue in 2003 included the four bonus tracks.

== Background ==
Del Amitri had released their debut single "Sense Sickness" in 1983 on the Glasgow indie label NoStrings Records. They recorded their first Peel session in March 1984, which led to a deal with Chrysalis Records later in the year. After an unsuccessful session at Britannia Row Studios in London with former frontman of Television, Tom Verlaine, producing, the band recorded their first album with producer Hugh Jones at Park Lane Studio in Glasgow.

Before the release of the album's first single, Melody Maker magazine heard a cassette tape of work in progress and put the band on the cover of their February 1985 issue, dubbing them "the hottest new twang of '85". No single was released at the time to capitalise on this, and the album failed to chart when released in May 1985. In the Del Amitri biography on AllMusic, James Christopher Monger wrote that the album was released "amidst a tidal wave of hype, but their signature blend of new wave and country folk isolated audiences and critics alike, resulting in their inevitable departure from the Chrysalis family."

== Critical reception ==
Professional ratings
Review scores
Source	Rating
AllMusic	3/5 stars
Encyclopedia of Popular Music	3/5 stars
The Great Rock Discography	6/10

Retrospectively reviewing the album for AllMusic, Stephen Schnee called it a "quirky and often brilliant debut." He felt that the lyrics were "intelligent and witty, laced with sarcasm and venom," and the music contained "jaunty rhythms and quirky melodies." He also felt that calling Del Amitri "the bastard sons of XTC and Elvis Costello would not have been too far off the mark."

== Track listing ==
All tracks are written by Justin Currie, Iain Harvie, Bryan Tolland and Paul Tyagi, except where noted.

No.	Title	Length
1.	"Heard Through a Wall"	3:01
2.	"Hammering Heart"	2:58
3.	"Former Owner"	3:04
4.	"Sticks and Stones, Girl"	3:10
5.	"Deceive Yourself (In Ignorant Heaven)"	4:02
6.	"I Was Here"	2:53
7.	"Crows in the Wheatfield"	2:51
8.	"Keepers"	4:39
9.	"Ceasefire"	2:59
10.	"Breaking Bread"	3:29

2003 CD bonus tracks
No.	Title	Writer(s)	Producer(s)	Length
11.	"This King Is Poor" (B-side of "Sticks and Stones, Girl")		Del Amitri	3:37
12.	"The Difference Is" (B-side of "Sticks and Stones, Girl")		Del Amitri	3:42
13.	"Lines Running North" (B-side of "Hammering Heart")		Del Amitri	2:54
14.	"Brown Eyed Girl" (live) (B-side of "Hammering Heart")	Van Morrison	none credited; mixed by Kenny MacDonald	3:53

Notes

- Tracks 11 and 12 recorded at Sirocco Studio, Kilmarnock.
- Track 13 recorded at Park Lane Studio, Glasgow, August 1985.
- Track 14 originally recorded by Van Morrison, 1967.

== Personnel ==
Del Amitri

- Justin Currie – vocals, bass
- Iain Harvie – guitar
- Bryan Tolland – guitar
- Paul Tyagi – drums

Additional musicians

- Peter Griffiths – organ on "Deceive Yourself"
- Preston Heyman – additional percussion

Technical

- Hugh Jones – producer
- Chris Orr – original etchings 'Flying Ducks' for sleeve (courtesy Thumb Gallery, London)

== Sources ==
- Liner notes from the cassette insert
