= The Undeveloped Heart EP =

EP by Ricky Ross
- Released: 1998
- Genre: Rock, Pop, Alternative rock
- Label: Internazionale Records
- Producer: Paul McGeechan, Ricky Ross

Ricky Ross chronology
| New Recording (1997) | The Undeveloped Heart EP (1998) | This is the Life (2002) |

The Undeveloped Heart EP is the sole single/EP release from Scottish rock musician Ricky Ross' album New Recording. It contains a new version of "The Undeveloped Heart", which was originally recorded by Ross' band Deacon Blue and re-recorded by Ross for New Recording. The addition of a driving bass line and guitar to "The Undeveloped Heart (98 Remix)" completes the move of the song from its original form as an understated piano ballad to a track that sits fully in alternative rock territory.

Deacon Blue would regroup in 1999 and release two albums before Ross' next solo album, This Is the Life would be released in 2002.

== Track listing ==
All songs written by Ricky Ross, except where noted:

1. "The Undeveloped Heart (98 Remix)" – 3:57
2. "Ghost" – 2:46
3. "Wake Up and Dream (Acoustic Version)" – 3:25
4. "Passing Through" – 5:16
5. "Only Love Remains" – 2:00

== Personnel ==
- Ricky Ross - vocals, keyboards, guitar
- Paul McGeechan - programming, noises
- Mick Slaven - guitar on "The Undeveloped Heart (98 Remix)"
