= Lower Reaches =

Studio album by Justin Currie
- Released: August 19, 2013
- Recorded: Austin, TX
- Genre: Rock
- Length: 39:49
- Label: Compass
- Producer: Mike McCarthy

Justin Currie chronology
The Great War (2010)	Lower Reaches (2013)

Professional ratings
Review scores
Source	Rating
AllMusic	3.5/5 stars

Lower Reaches is the third solo album by singer/songwriter Justin Currie, best known as the vocalist for the band Del Amitri. The album was released on August 19, 2013.

== Track listing ==
All songs written by Justin Currie.

1. "Falsetto" – 3:50
2. "Every Song's the Same" – 2:30
3. "Bend to My Will" – 3:37
4. "Priscilla" – 3:31
5. "I Hate Myself for Loving You" – 2:30
6. "On a Roll" – 3:30
7. "Into a Pearl" – 4:12
8. "On My Conscience" – 2:50
9. "Half of Me" – 3:07
10. "Little Stars" – 4:15
11. "Guess" (bonus track) – 3:08
12. "London is Dead" (bonus track) – 2:49

== Personnel ==
- Josh Block – drums, tambourine
- Jesse Ebaugh – upright and electric bass
- Davíd Garza – piano, organ, acoustic and electric guitar, background vocals
- Ricky Ray Jackson – acoustic, electric and pedal steel guitar
- Jim McDermott – drums
- Bruce Robison – background vocals
