= Mother Nature's Kitchen =

Studio album by Kevin McDermott Orchestra
- Released: 1989
- Recorded: Park Lane Studios, Glasgow
- Genre: Rock; Indie Rock
- Label: Island
- Producer: Kevin McDermott and Kenny MacDonald

Mother Nature's Kitchen is the debut album from the Scottish singer/songwriter Kevin McDermott with his band Kevin McDermott Orchestra.

== History ==
"We had no producer, so the whole session was pretty much like a gang hut mentality. Everybody brought their creativity, sensitivities, sensibilities, and their humour. From the get-go, the talent was in the room. We just shared the experience.
There was nobody to tell us the right way or the wrong way to do things.
This was pre-samples, so anything you hear is really just off-the-cuff playing.
We knew how we wanted the record to sound."

—Kevin McDermott on Mother Nature's Kitchen, 18 April 2021

Following his solo album, Suffocation Blues, Kevin McDermott formed the Kevin McDermott Orchestra/KMO, with an initial line-up of Jim McDermott on drums, Steph Greer on bass, and Chris Bramble on percussion. They started performing the material that would become Mother Nature's Kitchen.

McDermott distributed KMO demos to record companies, the recordings now without Bramble, and with Iain Harvie, and they were soon signed to Island Records.

In 1989, KMO recorded Mother Nature’s Kitchen. The line-up for the album recording was Jim McDermott, Steph Greer, Robbie McIntosh, Blair Cowan, and David Crichton. Shortly after the recording was completed, Robbie McIntosh left to play for Paul McCartney, and Marco Rossi joined KMO on electric lead guitar.

In July 2022, the remastered Last Night From Glasgow release of Mother Nature’s Kitchen reached number ten in the Official Scottish Albums Chart Top 100.

== Track listing ==
All songs written by Kevin McDermott.

1. Wheels Of Wonder – 4:45
2. Slow Boat to Something Better – 3:54
3. King of Nothing – 4:18
4. Diamond – 3:20
5. Mother Nature's Kitchen – 4:47
6. Into the Blue – 3:40
7. Where We Were Meant To Be – 4:00
8. Statue to A Stone – 3:54
9. What Comes To Pass – 3:28
10. Suffocation Blues – 1:51
11. Angel – 4:32
12. Healing At The Harbour – 4:37

== Personnel ==
Musicians

Kevin McDermott: Vocals and Rhythm Guitar
Robbie McIntosh: Electric Lead Guitar
Jim McDermott: Drums and Percussion
Stephen Greer: Electric Bass Guitar and Backing Vocals
Blair Cowan: Keyboards
David Crichton: Fiddle
Technical personnel Engineered by Kenny MacDonald, assisted by David Bowie
Cover photograph by David Hiscock
