= Can You Do Me Good? =

Studio album by Del Amitri
- Released: 8 April 2002
- Recorded: 2000–2001
- Studio: Glasgow; Sheffield; London; Rochester; New Jersey
- Genre: Alternative rock
- Length: 49:42
- Label: Mercury / A&M
- Producer: Commissioner Gordon; Pete Smith; Kevin Bacon; Jonathan Quarmby

Del Amitri chronology
Hatful of Rain (1998)	Can You Do Me Good? (2002)	Fatal Mistakes (2021)

Singles from Can You Do Me Good?
- 1. "Just Before You Leave" Released: April 2002

Professional ratings
Review scores
Source	Rating
AllMusic	4/5 stars
Encyclopedia of Popular Music	3/5 stars
PopMatters	(favourable)

Can You Do Me Good? is the sixth studio album by Del Amitri, released on 8 April 2002 by Mercury / A&M.

The album showcased a radically different sound from which Del Amitri fans had become used to. With five years having elapsed since Some Other Sucker's Parade (1997), Can You Do Me Good? featured a new approach: drum loops, samples and synthesisers were the band's new tools. Though the songs retained their usual melodic characteristics, the overall impression was a very different one.

== Theme ==
Guitarist and songwriter Iain Harvie admitted in the run-up to the album's release that the band's record company considered Can You Do Me Good? to be Del Amitri's last chance. "It's a pretty straightforward equation. If we don't sell 300,000 copies of the new album, we're out. It's that simple." With this in mind, many of the album's lyrics seem to convey a tone of finality; the feeling that this is a band's last stand. Song titles like "One More Last Hurrah" and "Last Cheap Shot at the Dream" contribute to this, and "Just Getting By" seems almost to lament a career spent as rock's nearly-men:

Look at me

I'm the one who got away
The one who could've shone
I tried to do my best
But I guess your best don't last for long

Look at me
Standing with my tattered pride
Of toothless little lions
We tried to make a difference

Do something no one else had tried

Even for a lyricist like Justin Currie, whose songs have often dealt with missed opportunities and failure, Can You Do Me Good? is significantly more concerned with these concepts than previous albums.

== Track listing ==
All tracks are written by Justin Currie, except where noted.

No.	Title	Writer(s)	Length
1.	"Just Before You Leave"	Currie; Iain Harvie	5:14
2.	"Cash & Prizes"		4:38
3.	"Drunk in a Band"		2:44
4.	"One More Last Hurrah"	Currie; Harvie	4:52
5.	"Buttons on My Clothes"		4:05
6.	"Baby, It's Me"		3:34
7.	"Wash Her Away"	Currie; Harvie	3:07
8.	"Last Cheap Shot at the Dream"		4:12
9.	"Out Falls the Past"		3:13
10.	"She's Passing This Way"		2:44
11.	"Jesus Saves"		3:39
12.	"Just Getting By"		4:53

- "Just Getting By" is followed by a hidden track: an instrumental excerpt from "The Septic Jubilee" (a song released as a B-side on the "Just Before You Leave" single) which lasts for roughly 2:20. Including the space between the tracks Track 12 appears as 7:35 in length.

== Personnel ==
Credits adapted from the album liner notes.

Del Amitri

- Justin Currie – vocals, bass, acoustic guitar
- Iain Harvie – guitar, acoustic guitar, programming, backing vocals
- Kris Dollimore – guitar, acoustic guitar, backing vocals
- Andy Alston – piano, organ, synthesiser
- Mark Price – drums, drum loops

Additional musicians

- Matthew Rubano – bass (2, 11)
- Kevin Bacon (credited as "Big Kev") – bass (5, 6, 8)
- Rudy Bird – percussion (1, 4, 9)
- Jonathan Quarmby (credited as "Jonathan") – "tingly things" (5, 6)
- Joe Tomino – drum loop (4)
- Chris Komer – French horn (9)
- Chris Elliot – cello sample and trombone (12)
- Chris Cameron – string arrangements (1, 12)
- Gavyn Wright – orchestra leader

Technical

- Gordon "Commissioner Gordon" Williams – producer (tracks 2–4, 7, 9–11), additional producer (tracks 1, 12), mixing (tracks 1, 2, 4–9, 11, 12) (at The Headquarters, Teaneck, New Jersey)
- Pete Smith – producer (tracks 1, 3, 10, 12), mixing (tracks 3, 10) (at Livingston Studios, London)
- Kevin Bacon – producer (tracks 5, 6, 8)
- Jonathan Quarmby – producer (tracks 5, 6, 8)
- Jamie Siegel – engineer (tracks 2–4, 7, 9–11)
- Ben Darlow – mixing (tracks 3, 10) (at Livingston Studios, Wood Green), additional mixing (track 7) (at Westside Studios, London)
- Dave Bascombe – mixing (track 5) (at Whitfield Street Studios, London)
- Stylorouge – design, art direction
- Jeff Cottenden – photography
- Kevin Westenberg – photography (Del Amitri portrait)
