= Twisted (Del Amitri album) =

Studio album by Del Amitri
- Released: 27 February 1995
- Recorded: March–June 1994
- Studios: Haremere Hall (Etchingham, England); The Chapel (South Thoresby, England); The Funny Farm (East Lothian, Scotland); Palladium (Edinburgh, Scotland); Park Lane (Glasgow, Scotland); Helicon Mountain (London, England)
- Genre: Alternative rock
- Length: 54:12
- Label: A&M
- Producer: Al Clay

Del Amitri chronology
Change Everything (1992)	Twisted (1995)	Some Other Sucker's Parade (1997)

Singles from Twisted
- 1. "Here and Now" Released: 6 February 1995; 2. "Driving with the Brakes On" Released: 17 April 1995; 3. "Roll to Me" Released: 26 June 1995; 4. "Tell Her This" Released: October 1995

Professional ratings
Review scores
Source	Rating
AllMusic	4/5 stars
Encyclopedia of Popular Music	3/5 stars
The Great Rock Discography	6/10
Q	3/5 stars

Twisted is the fourth studio album by Del Amitri, released on 27 February 1995. It reached number three in the UK Albums Chart and was listed by Q Magazine as one of the top 10 best albums of 1995.

It was the last album to feature guitarist David Cummings, who left to begin a successful career in TV scriptwriting, and the only to feature drummer Chris Sharrock, who agreed to play on Twisted but declined to join the band as a permanent member. With a firmer emphasis on electric guitars than the band's last outing, 1992's Change Everything, the album represented a moderate change of direction for Del Amitri, whilst retaining their trademark melodic sensibilities.

The album included Del Amitri's most successful single, "Roll to Me", which reached the top ten in the US Hot 100. The band are known not to consider the song one of their best, however, and have often seemed irked by the fact that what they see as a throwaway pop song gave them their biggest hit. Also included was "Tell Her This", one of the group's most well-known songs.

== Track listing ==
All tracks are written by Justin Currie, except as noted.

No.	Title	Writer(s)	Length
1.	"Food for Songs"		3:38
2.	"Start with Me"	Currie; Iain Harvie	4:27
3.	"Here and Now"	Currie; Harvie	5:30
4.	"One Thing Left to Do"	Currie; Harvie	3:59
5.	"Tell Her This"		3:11
6.	"Being Somebody Else"	Currie; Harvie	6:26
7.	"Roll to Me"		2:12
8.	"Crashing Down"	Currie; Harvie	4:51
9.	"It Might as Well Be You"		4:34
10.	"Never Enough"	Currie; Harvie	5:28
11.	"It's Never Too Late to Be Alone"		5:05
12.	"Driving with the Brakes On"		4:44

Initial copies of the UK release of the album included a second live disc (catalog number 588 399-2, which was not made available separately).

Live CD
No.	Title	Writer(s)	Length
1.	"Hatful of Rain" (live)		4:52
2.	"When I Want You" (live)	Currie; Harvie; Mick Slaven	4:39
3.	"Crashing Down" (live)	Currie; Harvie	5:30
4.	"Move Away Jimmy Blue" (live)	Currie; Harvie	3:38
5.	"The Ones That You Love Lead You Nowhere" (live)		3:28
6.	"Stone Cold Sober" (live)		5:00

- Mixed live for radio broadcast.

=== 2014 expanded edition ===
Disc 1

- as per the original album

Disc 2
No.	Title	Writer(s)	Producer(s)	Length
1.	"Long Way Down" (B-side to "Here and Now")		Al Clay; The Groovey Tubes	3:32
2.	"Life By Mistake" (B-side to "Driving with the Brakes On")		Clay; The Groovey Tubes	3:40
3.	"In the Meantime" (B-side to "Driving with the Brakes On")		Clay; The Groovey Tubes	5:47
4.	"A Little Luck" (B-side to "Driving with the Brakes On")		Clay; The Groovey Tubes	3:54
5.	"In the Frame" (B-side to "Roll to Me")		The Groovey Tubes; mixed by Clay	3:50
6.	"Queen of False Alarms" (B-side to "Here and Now")		Clay; The Groovey Tubes	6:26
7.	"The Last Love Song" (B-side to "Tell Her This")		The Groovey Tubes; engineered by Kenny Patterson	3:43
8.	"A Better Man" (B-side to "Tell Her This")	Currie; Harvie; Andy Alston	The Groovey Tubes; engineered by Patterson	6:07
9.	"One Thing Left to Do" (acoustic version) (B-side to "Roll to Me")	Currie; Harvie	The Groovey Tubes; engineered by Roy Spong	4:00
10.	"Food for Songs" (acoustic version) (B-side to "Roll to Me")		The Groovey Tubes; engineered by Spong	3:30
11.	"Move Away Jimmy Blue" (remix) (B-side to "Roll to Me")	Currie; Harvie	Gil Norton; mixed by Julian Mendelsohn	3:49
12.	"Stone Cold Sober" (remix) (B-side to "Roll to Me")		Mark Freegard; mixed by Mike Shipley	4:41
13.	"When You Were Young" (alternate version) (B-side to "Tell Her This")		Don Smith	4:20
14.	"Crashing Down" (live) (from Twisted bonus live disc)	Currie; Harvie	none credited	5:29
15.	"Move Away Jimmy Blue" (live) (from Twisted bonus live disc)	Currie; Harvie	none credited	3:42
16.	"Stone Cold Sober" (live) (B-side to "Hear and Now")		Stewart Cruickshank; mixed by Clay	4:49

Notes

- Track 8 features additional vocals by singer and songwriter Jerry Burns.
- Track 16 recorded live at T in the Park; produced for Radio 1FM; first broadcast 17 September 1994.

== Personnel ==
Credits adapted from the album liner notes.

Del Amitri

- Justin Currie – vocals, bass, acoustic guitar
- Iain Harvie – guitar
- David Cummings – guitar
- Andy Alston – keyboards

Additional musicians

- Chris Sharrock – drums
- Frazer Spiers – harmonica on "Food for Songs"
- David Crichton – violin on "One Thing Left to Do"
- David McCluskey – percussion
- Martin Ditcham – percussion

Technical

- Al Clay – producer, engineer
- Bob Clearmountain – mixing
- Mario Sorrenti – photography
- Michael Nash Associates – design

== Charts ==
=== Weekly charts ===
Chart (1995)	Peak position
Australian Albums (ARIA)	44
German Albums (Offizielle Top 100)	69
Scottish Albums (Official Charts)	2
Swedish Albums (Sverigetopplistan)	41
Swiss Albums (Schweizer Hitparade)	36
UK Albums (Official Charts)	3
US Billboard 200	170

=== Year-end charts ===
Chart (1995)	Position
UK Albums (OCC)	67

== Certifications ==
Region	Certification	Certified units/sales
United Kingdom (BPI)	Gold	100,000^{^}
^{^} Shipments figures based on certification alone.
