= Fatal Mistakes =

Studio album by Del Amitri
- Released: 28 May 2021
- Recorded: March 2020
- Studio: Vada Studios, Warwickshire
- Genre: Rock
- Length: 45:52
- Label: Cooking Vinyl
- Producer: Dan Austin

Del Amitri chronology
Can You Do Me Good? (2002)	Fatal Mistakes (2021)

Singles from Fatal Mistakes
- 1. "Close Your Eyes and Think of England" Released: November 2020; 2. "It's Feelings" Released: February 2021; 3. "You Can't Go Back" Released: April 2021; 4. "All Hail Blind Love" Released: August 2021

Professional ratings
Aggregate scores
Source	Rating
Metacritic	82/100
Review scores
Source	Rating
American Songwriter	3.5/5 stars
Classic Rock	4/5 stars
Hooks and Harmony	4.5/5 stars
Maximum Volume Music	9/10
Mojo	4/5 stars
Outline	10/10
The Telegraph	4/5 stars

Fatal Mistakes is the seventh studio album by the Scottish band Del Amitri, released on 28 May 2021. It is the band's first studio album since 2002's Can You Do Me Good. It debuted at number five on the UK Albums Chart in the first week following its release.

== Background ==
Del Amitri reformed in 2014 after a ten year hiatus. Initially the band thought that fans did not want unreleased material, choosing to play only previously released songs during the 2014 tour. Singer Justin Currie was hesitant to release an album of new songs saying "we thought that's probably not what anyone is going to want to listen to".

By 2018, Currie and guitarist Iain Harvie had created finished songs that sounded "very Del Amitri". The two reformed the band with the lineup featured on 2014's live release Into the Mirror: Del Amitri in Concert, with keyboardist Andy Alston, guitarist Kris Dollimore and drummer Ash Soan.

Fatal Mistakes was recorded in March 2020 over a three-week period, with Del Amitri completing the sessions the day before the UK locked down due to the COVID-19 pandemic. Initially scheduled for release on 30 April 2021, the release date was moved to 28 May 2021 because of pandemic-related production delays.

== Track listing ==
All tracks are written by Justin Currie, except where noted.

No.	Title	Writer(s)	Length
1.	"You Can't Go Back"		2:53
2.	"All Hail Blind Love"	Currie; Iain Harvie	4:04
3.	"Musicians and Beer"		2:46
4.	"Close Your Eyes and Think of England"		3:30
5.	"Losing the Will to Die"		2:34
6.	"Otherwise"		3:01
7.	"It's Feelings"	Currie; Harvie	2:42
8.	"I'm So Scared of Dying"		4:27
9.	"Mockingbird, Copy Me Now"	Currie; Kris Dollimore	2:23
10.	"Missing Person"		3:19
11.	"Second Staircase"		3:00
12.	"Lonely"	Currie; Harvie	3:28
13.	"Nation of Caners"		7:39

== Fatal Mistakes – Outtakes and B-Sides ==
A five-track bonus CD titled Fatal Mistakes – Outtakes and B-Sides was initially available for a limited period as a companion piece to Fatal Mistakes on 28 May 2021. It was reissued with five additional tracks on 12 August 2022.

"When Cooking Vinyl asked us to supply material for a bonus CD to go with the various Fatal Mistakes packages, we seized the chance to resurrect the B-Side. We knew we had at least ten tunes written for the album that didn't make it into the final sequence," Del Amitri said in a press release. Two of the tracks, "Lips of London" and "Gone in a Second," were recorded during the March 2020 album session, while the rest were written for the project and recorded remotely during the COVID-19 lockdown of winter 2021.

=== Track listing ===
All tracks are written by Justin Currie, except where noted.

Original 2021 five-track release
No.	Title	Writer(s)	Length
1.	"Happiness Is It"		2:11
2.	"Gone in a Second"	Currie; Harvie	4:06
3.	"Shame"		3:46
4.	"O My Lazy Baby"		2:43
5.	"Some Mothers Do Have Them"		2:11

2022 ten-track reissue
No.	Title	Writer(s)	Length
1.	"Lips of London"		3:49
2.	"Gone in a Second"	Currie; Harvie	4:06
3.	"Shame"		3:46
4.	"Your Love (Is Killing Me)"		3:39
5.	"This City Loves You Back"	Currie; Harvie	4:11
6.	"Some Mothers Do Have Them"		2:11
7.	"Happiness Is It"		2:11
8.	"O My Lazy Baby"		2:43
9.	"My Adulthood"		3:02
10.	"At the End of the Lightning"		3:50

== Personnel ==
Credits adapted from the album liner notes.

Del Amitri

- Andy Alston
- Justin Currie
- Kris Dollimore
- Iain Harvie
- Ash Soan

Technical

- Dan Austin – producer, mixing
- The Groovey Tubes – producer (Fatal Mistakes – Outtakes and B-Sides, except "Gone in A Second" and "Lips of London")
- Paul McGeechan – mastering
- Gary Birchard – photography

== Charts ==
Chart performance for Fatal Mistakes
Chart (2021)	Peak position
German Albums (Offizielle Top 100)	34
Scottish Albums (OCC)	2
Swedish Physical Albums (Sverigetopplistan)	9
Swiss Albums (Schweizer Hitparade)	20
UK Albums (OCC)	5
UK Independent Albums (OCC)	2
