= The Uncle Devil Show =

The Uncle Devil Show may refer to:

- "The Uncle Devil Show" (The Twilight Zone), a 1985 episode of The Twilight Zone
- The Uncle Devil Show (band), a Scottish rock music trio
