= Last to Know (disambiguation) =

Last to Know may refer to:

- "Last to Know", a song by Pink from her 2004 album Try This
- Last to Know (Human Nature song), 1999
- "The Last to Know", a song by Sheena Easton from her 1987 album No Sound but a Heart; covered and released as a single by Celine Dion in 1990 from her album Unison
- "Last to Know", a song by Three Days Grace from their 2009 album Life Starts Now
- ""Always the Last to Know", a song by Del Amitri from their 1992 album Change Everything
