= The Higsons =

English funk-punk band

- Origin: Norwich, Norfolk, England
- Genres: Punk funk, ska
- Years active: 1980–1986
- Labels: Romans in Britain, 2 Tone, Upright, Waap, R4
- Past members: Charlie Higson; Terry Edwards; Simon Charterton; Colin Williams; Stuart McGeachin; Dave Cummings
- Website: The Higsons - artist profile

The Higsons were an English funk-punk band, who existed between 1980 and 1986.

== History ==
Founded in 1980 at the University of East Anglia in Norwich, Norfolk, England, The Higsons' first recording was on the Norwich - A Fine City compilation album. The Higsons' first single, "I Don't Want to Live with Monkeys", was released in 1981 on the short-lived Romans In Britain label. The group subsequently issued singles on their own Waap! Records label and in 1982 became one of the first non-ska acts signed to 2 Tone Records.

The band's blend of high-energy funk and groove brought them some chart success: their most remembered track was "Conspiracy", released in 1982, with the refrain "Who stole my bongos?; Did you steal my bongos?". Following the end of their association with 2 Tone, the group issued their first and only studio album Curse of the Higsons on Upright Records in 1984. The album included their cover of "Music to Watch Girls By" which reached number 83 in the UK singles chart, helped by a heavily-reworked electronics-based 12" mix re-titled "Music to Watch Boys By". Though work began on a second album, the band ultimately played their last gig in March 1986, disbanding by mutual consent.

=== After the break-up ===
Charlie Higson found fame as a comedy writer and actor in The Fast Show. Dave Cummings, after several years as a guitarist with Scottish rock band Del Amitri, re-joined forces with Higson as a scriptwriter on The Fast Show, and continues to write for radio, TV, and film. Terry Edwards joined Gallon Drunk in 1993, fronted his own band and became a session musician. Simon Charterton formed the bands The Aftershave, Zook, Nitwood and Simon & the Pope. Edwards and Charterton played together in the Near Jazz Experience. Stuart McGeachin and Colin Williams got full-time jobs.

Robyn Hitchcock paid tribute to the band with the song "Listening to the Higsons" which acknowledged their song "Got to Let This Heat Out" in the couplet, "I thought I heard them singing "Gotta let this hen out"." Hitchcock used this mishearing as the title of his 1985 live album with the Egyptians.

=== Band members ===
- Charlie "Switch" Higson (lead vocals / harmonica / piano)
- Terry Edwards (guitar / saxophone / trumpet / back voices / piano)
- Stuart McGeachin (guitar / vocals)
- Simon Charterton (drums / vocals)
- Colin Williams (bass / vocals)
- David Cummings (guitar / vocals)

== Discography ==
=== Albums ===
- The Curse of the Higsons (October 1984)

=== Cassette ===
- The Higsons Live at the Jacquard Club, Norwich 11.2.82 (limited edition of 4000) (April 1982), Backs Records / Chaos Tapes

=== Compilation albums ===
- Attack of the Cannibal Zombie Businessmen (retrospective singles compilation) (1987), Waap Records
- It's a Wonderful Life (compilation of BBC Radio 1 sessions, on the Hux record label) (1998)
- Run Me Down - The Complete Two-Tone Recordings (Record Store Day 2023), Sartorial Records

=== UK singles ===
Title	Date	UK Chart	UK Indie Chart	Label	Format	Cat ref.	Other tracks
"I Don't Want to Live with Monkeys"	July 1981	—	5	Romans in Britain	7"	HIG2	"Insect Love"
"I Don't Want to Live with Monkeys"	July 1981	—	5	Romans in Britain	12"	—	—
"The Lost and the Lonely"	November 1981	—	10	Waap	7"	WAAP1	"It Goes Waap"
"(Got to Let This) Heat (Out)"	November 1981	—	10	Waap	12"	12WAAP1	"It Goes Waap" (re-recorded)
"Conspiracy"	March 1982	—	5	Waap	7"	WAAP2	"Touchdown"
"Tear the Whole Thing Down"	October 1982	—	—	2 Tone	7"	CHSTT21	"Ylang, Ylang"
"Tear the Whole Thing Down"	October 1982	—	—	2 Tone	12" white label promo	CHSTT1221	"Ylang, Ylang"
"Run Me Down"	February 1983	—	—	2 Tone	7"	CHSTT24	"Put the Punk Back into Funk Pts 1 & 2"
"Run Me Down"	February 1983	—	—	2 Tone	12"	CHSTT1224	"Run Me Down" (Long Version) "Run Me Down" (instrumental) "Put the Punk Back into Funk Pts 1 & 2"
"Push Out the Boat"	November 1983	—	4	Waap	7"	WAAP4	"Round and Round Pub Mix"
"Push Out the Boat"	November 1983	—	4	Waap	12"	12WAAP4	"Round and Round Pub Mix" "Push Out the Boat" (extended)
"Music to Watch Girls By" "Music to Watch Boys By"	7": 1983; 12": Sep 1984	—	2	Upright	7"	UP 9	"Music to Watch Girls By" (7" only) "Lying on the Telephone"
"Music to Watch Girls By" "Music to Watch Boys By"	7": 1983; 12": Sep 1984	—	2	Upright	12"	UPT 9	"Music to Watch Boys By" (unique 12" version) "Lying on the Telephone" "Clanking My Bucket" (live at The Lyceum, 3.7.84) "I Don't Want to Live with Monkeys" (live at The Lyceum, 3.7.84)
"Music to Watch Girls By" "Music to Watch Boys By"	7": 1983; 12": Sep 1984	—	2	Upright	—	—	—
"Take It"	1985	—	—	R4	7"	FOR2	"I Walk the Land"
"Take It"	1985	—	—	R4	12"	12FOR2	"I Walk the Land" "Take It" (extended mix) "Take It" (instrumental)
"Lost and the Lonely"	December 1981	—	—	Vinyl Magazine No. 9 (released in the Netherlands)	Flexidisc	V 9	"Jigsaw Mentallama" (by Virgin Prunes)

== BBC Radio 1 in concert ==
A one-hour concert was recorded and broadcast from the Paris Theatre in London on 7 September 1983. The Higsons played the first half hour whilst the Norwich-based band the Farmer's Boys played the second half.

- Tracks played:
  - "Gangway"
  - "Where Have All the Club-A-Go-Gos Went Went?"
  - "Born Blind"
  - "Music to Watch Boys By"
  - "Heat"
  - "Run Me Down"
  - "Clanking My Bucket"
  - "Push Out the Boat"

== Videos ==
- Jacquard Club, Live February 1982 (released by MEI) NB this is a live audio-cassette only release, not a video.
- The Camden Palace, Live 2 November 1984 (broadcast on London Weekend Television programme 'Live In London' 19.1.85)
- I Don't Want To Live With Monkeys Live [2006] (released by Cherry Red - reissue of Camden Palace gig)
