= Pale Rider (disambiguation) =

Pale Rider is a 1985 Western film directed by Clint Eastwood.

Pale Rider may also refer to:

- Four Horsemen of the Apocalypse, in Christian eschatology
- Pale Horse, Pale Rider, a 1939 book by Katherine Anne Porter
- Pale Rider (Drapht album), a 2003 hip-hop album by Drapht
- Pale Rider (Ricky Ross album), a 2005 rock album by Ricky Ross
- Pale Rider: The Spanish Flu of 1918 and How It Changed the World, a 2017 book by Laura Spinney
