= This Is the Life (Ricky Ross album) =

Studio album by Ricky Ross
- Released: 2002
- Recorded: August 2000.
- Genre: Rock, pop
- Label: Chrysalis Records (Papillon) (UK); Evolver (US)
- Producer: Kenny MacDonald, Ricky Ross, Davie Scott

Ricky Ross chronology
The Undeveloped Heart EP (1997)	This Is the Life (2002)	Pale Rider (2005)

Professional ratings
Review scores
Source	Rating
Allmusic	3/5 stars

This Is the Life is a solo album from Scottish rock musician Ricky Ross, a member of Deacon Blue.

Ross produced the album with Kenny MacDonald, who had produced for Deacon Blue in the past. The album has more touches of folk and country music and the general mood of the album is more placid than most of the Deacon Blue catalog.

Deacon Blue colleague James Prime plays piano on "The Way to Work", and Ross' wife and Deacon Blue colleague Lorraine McIntosh contributes vocals to one song (as she did on each of Ross' three prior solo albums), "Nothing Cures That".

This is the first Ricky Ross solo album to receive a US release.

== Track listing ==
All songs written by Ricky Ross, except where noted.

1. "Northern Soul" (Ross, Charlie Dore) – 6:34
2. "London Comes Alive" (Ross, Mick Slaven) – 3:33
3. "Rodeo Boy" (Ross, Davie Scott) – 4:32
4. "Angel and Mercedes" (Ross, Slaven) – 5:05
5. "I Sing About You" (Ross, Slaven) – 4:28
6. "Nothing Cures That" – 4:26
7. "This Is the Life" – 6:01
8. "Threatening Rain" – 3:05
9. "Starring Love" – 3:56
10. "Hippy Girl" – 3:48
11. "My Girl Going to Town" (Ross, Scott) – 5:13
12. "Looking for My Own Lone Ranger" (Ross, Dore) – 2:29
13. "The Way to Work" – 4:54

=== Bonus download track ===
1. "Driving George" – 3:58 (No longer available as URL no longer active)

== Personnel ==
- Ricky Ross - vocals, guitar, percussion, piano, wurlitzer, synthesizer
- Davie Scott - piano, bass guitar, keyboards, glockenspiel, percussion, backing vocals
- Mick Slaven - guitar, mandolin
- Jim Gash - drums
- Scott Fraser - bass guitar
- Simon Clarke - baritone saxophone, alto saxophone on "Nothing Cures That"
- Tim Sanders - tenor saxophone on "Nothing Cures That"
- Roddy Lorimer - trumpet on "Nothing Cures That"
- Annie Whitehead - trombone on "Nothing Cures That"
- Jacqui Penfold - viola on "Looking for My Own Lone Ranger"
- Jo Sutherland - violin on "Looking for My Own Lone Ranger"
- Alastair Savage - violin on "Looking for My Own Lone Ranger"
- Amanda Shearman - cello on "Looking for My Own Lone Ranger"
- James Prime - piano on "The Way to Work"
- Lorraine McIntosh - backing vocals on "Nothing Cures That"
