= Pale Rider (Ricky Ross album) =

Studio album by Ricky Ross
- Released: 2005
- Genre: Rock, Pop
- Label: P3 Music
- Producer: David (Davie) Scott

Ricky Ross chronology
This Is the Life (2002)	Pale Rider (2005)

Pale Rider is a solo album from Scottish rock musician (and member of Deacon Blue) Ricky Ross.

Ross' musical style on Pale Rider strays only slightly from his previous solo album, This Is the Life, and thus breaks his tradition of making significant shifts in musical direction on each of his solo albums. Despite the similarities in style, Pale Rider is, overall, a more vibrant and melodic album than its predecessor—despite its recurring themes of death and mortality.

One of the strongest songs expressing these themes is "In the End", which Ross dedicates to Deacon Blue guitarist Graeme Kelling, who died due to cancer before the album's release. The lyrics reference the last conversation Ross had with Kelling just prior to Kelling's passing.

Ross does not, however, break the tradition of featuring his wife and fellow Deacon Blue member Lorraine McIntosh on backing vocals for one track on the album. This time around, McIntosh is featured on "In this World".

The album also contains Ross' version of the song "She Gets Me Inside", which Ross wrote for recording artist Ronan Keating on Keating's album Turn It On.

== Track listing ==
All songs written by Ricky Ross, except where noted:

1. "She Gets Me Inside" – 3:21
2. "Boys Break the Things They Love the Most" (Ross, McIntosh) – 3:47
3. "If You've Got the Time It's Gonna Take" – 4:28
4. "The Streets Are Covered in Snow" – 4:04
5. "Soundtrack to the Summer" – 3:48
6. "In this World" – 4:19
7. "Pale Rider" – 3:34
8. "Calvary" – 3:33
9. "I Know It's Only Sunday" – 2:52
10. "Kichijoji" – 5:37
11. "History" – 3:33
12. "In the End" – 3:30

== Personnel ==
- Ricky Ross - vocals, acoustic guitar, piano, wurlitzer
- David (Davie) Scott - guitars, backing vocals, keyboards, percussion, bass, mandolin
- Scott Fraser - bass, programming
- Mick Slaven - guitars, slide guitar
- Jim Gash - drums, percussion
- Derek Star - percussion, hand claps
- Lorraine McIntosh - backing vocals on "In this World"
- Jon Beales - violin
- Wendy Wetherby - cello
- Colin Steele - trumpet
