= The Farmer's Boys =

British band

- Promotional photo

Background information
- Origin: Norwich, England
- Genres: Indie pop; synthpop; new wave
- Years active: 1981–1985
- Labels: Waap, Backs, EMI
- Past members: Chris "Baz" Basford; Mark Kingston; Ian "Stan" Thirkettle; Richard Adrian "Frog" Frost; Andy Hearnshaw
- Website: thefarmersboys.com

The Farmer's Boys were a British band from Norwich, England. They formed in the early 1980s and were briefly called 'Bang Goes My Stereo' before changing their name to 'The Farmer's Boys'.

== History ==
Initially a three piece act, the band employed a drum machine which gave them a somewhat distinctive sound, which combined elements of country and Western, disco and punk. The band's faux 'rural bumpkin' imagery and self-deprecating humour was an important part of their appeal, but led to some scathing reviews in the metropolitan music press. The band played many gigs with The Higsons and for a while was identified as one of the hubs of the 1980s Norwich scene, an eclectic collection of post-punk acts that fused indie and dance to varied degrees.

Early singles were released on local Norwich labels, with the band's first single, "I Think I Need Help", released in April 1982. This attracted airplay from John Peel who became a champion of the band and invited them for several sessions, with David Jensen doing likewise (they recorded three sessions for the latter in 1982–83). In January 1983, "More Than a Dream" was their first single for EMI, a reissue of an independent single that gained some national airplay. Their next single "Muck It Out" was a near-hit, and was followed by their debut album Get Out and Walk.

In 1984, a cover of "In the Country" – previously recorded by Cliff Richard – stalled just outside the Top 40 despite considerable national airplay and promotional TV appearances. This marked the nearest the band came to chart success. The subsequent album With These Hands followed, with the addition of a drummer both on record and live gigs moving the band further away from its early 'indie' sounds. Two more singles were released before the band split in 1985, citing the enigmatic reason of "electrical differences".

Post-split, Baz and Mark went on to form The Avons in 1985. Mark later joined The Nivens. Stan formed Dr Fondle. Frog joined The Higsons and played keyboards in a Julian Cope tour in the late 1980s and original guitarist Andy left early on to join Serious Drinking. In the 2000s, Baz, Mark and Stan played as the McGuilty Brothers.

In 2021, the podcast C90 interviewed Baz about his time in the band and getting signed, while revealing that the band decided to split up while in a pub.

== Discography ==
=== Albums ===
- 1983: Get Out and Walk (EMI, 1077993) – UK No. 49 (produced by Frog and Pete Hammond, except "For You" and "Matter of Fact", accompanied by a special edition 12-inch single featuring 12" versions of "For You", "Probably One of the Best Investments I Ever Made", "Soft Drink" and "Muck It Out")
- 1985: With These Hands (EMI, EJ 2402904)

=== Compilation albums ===
- 2003: Once Upon a Time in the East (The Early Years 1981–1982)

=== Singles ===
Title	Date	UK Singles Chart	UK Indie Chart	Label	Format	Cat #	Other tracks
"I Think I Need Help"	April 1982	—	15	"Waap"	7"	WAAP3	"Squit"
"I Think I Need Help"	April 1982	—	15	"Waap"	12"	12WAAP3	"Squit" "More Squit" "Squittest"
"Whatever Is He Like?"	July 1982	—	8	Backs	7"	NCH01	"I Lack Concentration"
"More Than a Dream"	December 1982	—	4	Backs	7"	NCH03	"Country Line"
"More Than a Dream"	January 1983	—	—	EMI	7"	EMI5367	"Country Line"
"Muck It Out"	April 1983	48	—	EMI	7" (pic. disc)	EMIP5380	"Funky Combine John"
"Muck It Out"	April 1983	48	—	EMI	12"	12EMI5380	"Funky Combine John"
"For You"	July 1983	66	—	EMI	7"	EMI5401	"T.O.S.D."
"For You"	July 1983	66	—	EMI	double 7"	EMID5401	"T.O.S.D." "Muck It Out" (demo) "Drinking and Dressing Up" (demo) "Something I Ate" (demo) "I Don't Know Why" (demo)
"Apparently"	January 1984	98	—	EMI	7"	FAB1	"Uncle Freddie"
"Apparently"	January 1984	98	—	EMI	12"	12FAB1	"Uncle Freddie"
"In the Country"	July 1984	44	—	EMI	7"	FAB2	"Mama Never Told Me"
"In the Country"	July 1984	44	—	EMI	7" pic. disc	FABP2	"Mama Never Told Me"
"In the Country"	July 1984	44	—	EMI	12"	12FAB2	"Mama Never Told Me" "Matter of Fact"
"Phew Wow"	October 1984	59	—	EMI	7"	FAB3	"Portrait of a Legend (Part 1)"
"Phew Wow"	October 1984	59	—	EMI	12"	12FAB3	"Portrait of a Legend (Part 1)"
"I Built the World"	February 1985	107	—	EMI	7"	FAB4	"Sometimes"
"I Built the World"	February 1985	107	—	EMI	12"	12FAB4	"Sometimes" "Probably One of the Best Investments I Ever Made" (live) "Sport for All"

== BBC Radio 1 'In Concert' ==
A concert was recorded and broadcast from the Lyceum Theatre in London on 7 September 1983. The Farmer's Boys played the second half-hour, whilst another Norwich band the Higsons played the first half. Tracks played:

1. "Whatever Is He Like?"
2. "Matter of Fact"
3. "Who Needs It?" (with Terry Edwards from The Higsons on saxophone)
4. "More Than a Dream" (with Terry Edwards on saxophone)
5. "I Woke Up This Morning"
6. "Soft Drink"
7. "The Way You Made Me Cry"
8. "For You"
