= Change Everything =

Studio album by Del Amitri
- Released: 1 June 1992
- Recorded: Late summer–autumn 1991
- Studio: Master Rock, London; Park Lane, Glasgow
- Genre: Alternative rock
- Length: 50:57
- Label: A&M
- Producer: Gil Norton

Del Amitri chronology
Waking Hours (1989)	Change Everything (1992)	Twisted (1995)

Singles from Change Everything
- 1. "Always the Last to Know" Released: 27 April 1992; 2. "Be My Downfall" Released: 29 June 1992; 3. "Just Like a Man" Released: 31 August 1992; 4. "When You Were Young" Released: 11 January 1993

Professional ratings
Review scores
Source	Rating
AllMusic	4.5/5 stars
Encyclopedia of Popular Music	4/5 stars
Entertainment Weekly	B+
The Great Rock Discography	7/10
Q	4/5 stars
Select	2/5 stars

Change Everything is the third studio album by Del Amitri, released on 1 June 1992 in the UK. It reached number 2 in the UK Albums Chart – the band's biggest hit LP – and was nominated by Q Magazine as one of the top 50 albums of 1992. It included the single "Always the Last to Know", which reached number 13 in the UK Singles Chart and entered the top 40 of the US Hot 100.

== Track listing ==
All tracks are written by Justin Currie, except where noted.

No.	Title	Writer(s)	Length
1.	"Be My Downfall"		3:29
2.	"Just Like a Man"	Currie; Iain Harvie	5:03
3.	"When You Were Young"		3:59
4.	"Surface of the Moon"		5:14
5.	"I Won't Take the Blame"		3:54
6.	"The First Rule of Love"		4:00
7.	"The Ones That You Love Lead You Nowhere"		3:11
8.	"Always the Last to Know"		4:21
9.	"To Last a Lifetime"		4:08
10.	"As Soon as the Tide Comes In"		4:23
11.	"Behind the Fool"		3:18
12.	"Sometimes I Just Have to Say Your Name"	Currie; Harvie	5:52

=== 2014 expanded edition ===
Disc 1

- as per the original album

Disc 2
No.	Title	Writer(s)	Producer(s)	Length
1.	"Learn to Cry" (B-side to "Always the Last to Know")		Gil Norton	3:45
2.	"Angel on the Roof" (B-side to "Always the Last to Know")		The Groovey Tubes	4:52
3.	"The Whole World Is Quiet" (B-side to "Always the Last to Know")		The Groovey Tubes	2:34
4.	"Whiskey Remorse" (B-side to "Be My Downfall")		The Groovey Tubes	3:15
5.	"Lighten Up the Load" (B-side to "Be My Downfall")		The Groovey Tubes	4:09
6.	"The Heart Is a Bad Design" (B-side to "Be My Downfall")		The Groovey Tubes	2:06
7.	"Don't Cry No Tears" (B-side to "Just Like a Man")	Neil Young	The Groovey Tubes	3:55
8.	"Bye Bye Pride" (B-side to "Just Like a Man")	Grant McLennan; Robert Forster	The Groovey Tubes	4:33
9.	"Cindy Incidentally" (B-side to "Just Like a Man")	Rod Stewart; Ronnie Wood; Ian McLagan	The Groovey Tubes	2:47
10.	"Spit in the Rain" (remix) (B-side to "Just Like a Man")		Norton	3:54
11.	"I Won't Take the Blame" (acoustic version) (B-side to "Just Like a Man")		The Groovey Tubes	3:40
12.	"Scared to Live" (B-side to "Just Like a Man")	Currie; Harvie	The Groovey Tubes	4:48
13.	"Long Journey Home" (B-side to "When You Were Young")		The Groovey Tubes	4:25
14.	"The Verb to Do" (B-side to "When You Were Young")		The Groovey Tubes	2:42
15.	"Kestrel Road" (B-side to "When You Were Young")	Currie, Harvie	The Groovey Tubes	4:12
16.	"The Ones That You Love Lead You Nowhere" (live) (B-side to "When You Were Young")		none credited; mixed by the Groovey Tubes, Kenny Patterson	4:09
17.	"Kiss This Thing Goodbye" (live) (B-side to "When You Were Young")	Currie; Harvie; Mick Slaven	none credited; mixed by the Groovey Tubes, Patterson	4:17
18.	"Hatful of Rain" (live) (B-side to "When You Were Young")	Currie; Harvie; Slaven	none credited; mixed by the Groovey Tubes, Patterson	4:36

Note

- Tracks 16–18 recorded live at the Town & Country Club, London, 1993.

== Personnel ==
Del Amitri

- Justin Currie – vocals, bass, guitar
- Iain Harvie – guitar
- David Cummings – guitar
- Andy Alston – keyboards
- Brian McDermott – drums

Additional musicians

- Nick Clark – bass on "When You Were Young", "I Won't Take the Blame" and "Sometimes I Just Have to Say Your Name"
- Gary Barnacle – baritone and tenor saxophone on "Always the Last to Know"

Technical

- Gil Norton – producer
- Steven Haigler – engineer
- John McDonald – assistant engineer
- Kenny Patterson – assistant engineer
- Bob Ludwig – mastering (at Masterdisk, New York City)
- Stylorouge – artwork
- Kevin Westenburg – photography
- Rob O'Conner – photography
- Steve Double – photography

== Charts ==
Chart performance for Change Everything
Chart (1992)	Peak position
Australian Albums	24
European Top 100 Albums	17
German Albums	86
Swedish Albums	34
Swiss Albums	37
UK Albums Chart	2
US Billboard 200	178
