= Once Upon a Time in the East (The Early Years 1981–1982) =

Compilation album by The Farmer's Boys
- Released: 2003
- Recorded: 1981–1982
- Genre: New wave
- Label: Backs Recording Company

The Farmer's Boys chronology
With These Hands (1985)	Once Upon a Time in the East (The Early Years 1981–1982) (2003)

Once Upon a Time in the East (The Early Years 1981–1982) is a compilation album from the 1980s British band The Farmer's Boys.

== Track listing ==
1. "I Lack Concentration"
2. "Or What"
3. "Squit"
4. "Autumn"
5. "I Don't Know Why I Don't Like All My Friends"
6. "I Think I Need Help" (early recording)
7. "Squittest" (early recording)
8. "Muck It Out" (flexi disc version)
9. "Spring"^
10. "Funny Old Mr. Baz (Whatever Is He Like?)"^
11. "With These Hands I Built the World"†
12. "Description of the River Wavney at Wortwell"†
13. "Soft Drink"†
14. "Drinking and Dressing Up"†
15. "The Country Line"†
16. "Funky Combine John"^
17. "T.O.S.D."^
18. "More Than a Dream"^
19. "Homo Kino"

† Peel Session recordings

^ Recorded for The David Jensen Show
