= Kevin McDermott (singer-songwriter) =

- Born: Kevin Francis McDermott; 10 February 1962 (age 63); St Francis Maternity Hospital
- Origin: Glasgow, Scotland
- Occupations: Musician, singer, songwriter
- Instruments: Vocals, guitar
- Years active: 1982-present
- Labels: No Strings Records; Island Records; Thirteen Records; Tula Records; Iona Records
- Website: Kevin McDermott Orchestra

Kevin Francis McDermott (born 10 February 1962 in Glasgow, Scotland) is a Scottish musician, singer and songwriter.

== Early life ==
Kevin Francis McDermott was born 10 February 1962, to Evelyn and Frank McDermott. He has two younger brothers, Paul, and Jim. When his family emigrated to Canada for a period, he attended the Holy Name School in Toronto. Upon their return to Glasgow, he attended Our Lady of the Assumption School, in Ruchill, and then St Charles School, and St Columba of Iona School, in Maryhill.

The first album McDermott bought was Buddy Holly Lives. He was influenced by both Buddy Holly, and The Beatles. He was given an acoustic guitar by his Uncle Joe, at age 14, and taught himself to play by ear.

McDermott joined Yarrow Shipbuilders Limited in 1978, when he was sixteen years old, working as a ship draughtsman.

Inspired, after attending the farewell concert of The Rezillos at The Apollo (Glasgow), McDermott started to write and perform live, both solo, and with The Suede Crocodiles.

== The Suede Crocodiles ==
In 1982, McDermott (vocals/guitar) formed Glaswegian band, Popgun, with Davie McCormick (drums), and Ross Drummond (bass/vocals). They were later joined by Roddy Johnson (vocals/guitar).

In 1983, having changed their name to The Suede Crocodiles, they released a single, Stop The Rain, written by McDermott, on the NoStrings record label run by Nick Low and Grahame Cochrane. Low had started managing the band after seeing them perform at The Venue, Glasgow, in 1982.

The Suede Crocodiles joined Nick Heyward on a UK wide tour, including two sell-out gigs at the Dominion Theatre in London.

Alan Cruickshank later replaced Davie McCormick on drums, but the band split up before releasing their second single, Paint Yourself a Rainbow.

Johnson and Drummond went on to form The Forth Room, and McDermott went solo. Stop the Rain, a compilation of unreleased material, was released in 2001 on Accident Records, and re-released in 2010 on Fastcut Records.

McDermott's "swinging" Stop The Rain was described as "hook heaven" on Soundblab.

== Solo career: 1980s ==
In 1986, McDermott released an acoustic album, Suffocation Blues, on the NoStrings label. The record was produced by Rab Noakes.

In 1986, McDermott contributed the track The Right to Reply to the Honey at the Core fanzine's compilation cassette. The compilation was described as "the '86 school of most likely to" by NME (who had recently released their own C86 compilation), and was created by John Williamson.

Later that year, McDermott played at The Marquee and the Sheffield Leadmill with Del Amitri.

In August 1986, McDermott travelled across the United States, alongside Del Amitri, playing impromptu gigs, whilst travelling from coast to coast in a borrowed van. They performed 12 shows, in six weeks, in record shops, bars, and restaurants. By the time he returned to Scotland in September 1986, McDermott had decided to form a band of his own.

== Kevin McDermott Orchestra ==
McDermott formed the Kevin McDermott Orchestra/KMO, with an initial line-up of Jim McDermott on drums, Steph Greer on bass, and Chris Bramble on percussion. They started performing the material that would become KMO's first album. Early support slots included The Icicle Works and The Monochrome Set.

McDermott distributed KMO demos to record companies, the recordings now without Bramble, and with Iain Harvie, and they were soon signed to Island Records. In 1989, KMO recorded Mother Nature's Kitchen. The line-up for the album recording was Jim McDermott, Steph Greer, Robbie McIntosh, Blair Cowan, and David Crichton.

Marco Rossi joined KMO on guitar, having been recommended to McDermott by Robbie McIntosh. The band then began touring Mother Nature's Kitchen in the UK, and Ireland.

In 1990, KMO embarked on a US tour with The Alarm, and then, for the next four years, on stadium support tours, with Sting, INXS, and Simple Minds. They played at Wembley Stadium in 1991, supporting Rod Stewart on his Vagabond Heart tour, alongside Joe Cocker.

When Island Records founder Chris Blackwell sold his stake in the company, KMO were one of several bands who lost their investment during the shake-up, and subsequently left the label.

In June 1990, KMO played at George Square, Glasgow; part of The Big Day concert. The Big Day, a highlight of the European City of Culture celebrations, was the largest free concert ever to be held in Scotland, with a quarter of a million fans attending.

In 1991, KMO released their second album, Bedazzled, on Thirteen Records. It was produced by Hamish Barbour and Peter Jamieson. The film, which aired on STV on 16 November 1991, drew complaints to the station about its nudity content.

The band continued playing a gig until 1am at a Barrowland Ballroom gig on 12 October 1991.

A third album, The Last Supper was released in 1994 on Iona Records, and was a top ten hit in the UK indie chart, and was accompanied by a UK tour, culminating in a gig at the London Borderline.

In 1997, KMO released their fourth album For Those in Peril from the Sea, on Tula Records. MOJO magazine described it as "the kind of album one can get evangelical about", stating that the material "joins the dots between Young, Petty, Reed and Orbison".

In July 2022, the remastered Last Night From Glasgow release of Mother Nature’s Kitchen reached number ten in the Official Scottish Albums Chart Top 100.

=== Orphans ===
In 1992, KMO took up the moniker Orphans, in order to play more intimate gigs for their core fan base and friends, via a private mailing list. They performed at The Apollo (Glasgow) in 1992, and then the Glasgow Mayfair for a second, Christmas, gig that year. They continued to tour the UK as Orphans, including gigs at the Mean Fiddler in London and The Arches in Glasgow. A recording of Orphans material was later used as a bonus disc with the re-release of Bedazzled. Sharleen Spiteri sang guest vocals on the track Born Yesterday.

== Solo career: 1990s onwards ==
He has been described in 'The List' as being 'melodically joyous and lyrically delicious.' while his songs were described as "Teenage Fanclub melody with Radiohead tension" by MTV.

In 2005, McDermott played the Sunday Herald's tsunami relief gig at the Glasgow SECC.

== The Uncle Devil Show ==
In 2004, McDermott formed The Uncle Devil Show with Jim McDermott and Justin Currie. At the formation of the group, the members were anonymous, and the musicians credited as Langton Herring, Terrence, and Jason Barr, respectively. It was intended that the band retain their individual, hidden, identities for as long as possible during the marketing of the album. Justin Currie initially denied having anything to do with The Uncle Devil Show in a statement on the official Del Amitri website in February 2004. Kevin McDermott's website carried a similar denial. However, the label released the A Terrible Beauty CD with a jewel case sticker that read, "The stunning new band featuring Del Amitri frontman Justin Currie".

According to the band website, their premise was to "bring a universal message of intolerance and insularity which transcends all barriers". This message was incorporated into the language, and song themes, to a degree that prompted the label to release the CD with a parental advisory warning. The CD image was a facsimile of the I Want Candy LP sleeve by The Strangeloves.

In The Del Amitri Story, it is suggested of the "curious" A Terrible Beauty album, that Justin Currie's fans "didn't feel they were in on the joke". Regardless, the album was released to critical acclaim; John Murphy of musicOMH called the album "laugh out loud funny" and suggested that "songs such as I Had A Drink About You or She Cuts Her Own Fringe are at least the equal of anything the band members have been involved with before". Classic Rock magazine described A Terrible Beauty as "a hugely entertaining debut brimming with fine detail", and NME wrote that the album was "truly wonderful". Andy Morten of Shindig! magazine wrote that he had become 'addicted' to A Terrible Beauty to the extent that he played it each day, finding it laugh out loud funny. He continued that "the quality of the writing, playing and singing ... lift it so far above the pack, it can sometimes seem as though you've never heard people harmonising before". Morten further noted that A Terrible Beauty "contains the most profanities I've ever heard on a rock record, almost all of which still raise a smile 20-odd listens later".

== Personal life ==
In 2013, McDermott became involved in the 'Absent Voices' Sugar Archive project, funded by the Heritage Lottery Fund. The idea of the project was to highlight the 'absent' voices of thousands of workers from the once-booming Inverclyde sugar industry. McDermott was one of the central eight artists, led by Alec Galloway, who exhibited work across mediums including music, film, paintings and poetry. As part of the project, he also gave songwriting workshops in Greenock primary schools, incorporating the Absent Voices historical themes.

== Discography ==
=== The Suede Crocodiles ===
- Stop The Rain - (NoStrings 1983)

=== Kevin McDermott ===
- Suffocation Blues (NoStrings 1986)
- For Those In Peril From The Sea (Tula, 1997)
- Are We Having A Good Time Yet? (NoStrings 2008)
- Wise To The Fade (NoStrings 2008)

=== Kevin McDermott Orchestra ===
- Mother Nature's Kitchen (1989)
- Bedazzled (Thirteen Records, 1991)
- The Last Supper (Iona 1994)
- Fair And Whole (Tula, 1998)
- Suffocation Blues / River Sessions (2004)
- Bedazzled Re-issue (2004)
- KMO Official Bootleg Series - Live At The Borderline (2012)
- KMO Official Bootleg Series - Rarities, Demos, Live, Radio Sessions (2012)
- KMO Official Bootleg Series - Mother Nature's Kitchen Extended Edition (2012)
- DVD Boxed Set (River Records, 1999) RIVERCDVO62

=== The Uncle Devil Show ===
- A Terrible Beauty (2004) P3M009
