= The Suede Crocodiles =

Scottish indie pop band

- Origin: Glasgow, Scotland
- Genres: Indie pop
- Years active: 1983–1985
- Labels: NoStrings, Optic Nerve Recordings
- Past members: Kevin McDermott; Davie McCormick; Ross Drummond; Roddy Johnson

The Suede Crocodiles were a Scottish rock band from Glasgow, active from 1983 until 1985. Fronted by singer, songwriter and guitarist Kevin McDermott, the group are best known for their single Stop The Rain.

== Formation ==
The band was formed in 1982, under their original name, Popgun, with McDermott (vocals, guitar), Davie McCormick (drums), and Ross Drummond (bass/vocals). They were later joined by Roddy Johnson (vocals/guitar).

== Name change and Stop the Rain ==
In 1983, having changed their name to The Suede Crocodiles, they released a single, Stop The Rain, written by McDermott, on the NoStrings record label run by Nick Low and Grahame Cochrane. Low had started managing the band after seeing them perform at The Venue, Glasgow, in 1982.

Stop The Rain was made Single of the Week in both NME and Melody Maker.

== Tour, lineup changes, and split ==
The Suede Crocodiles joined Nick Heyward on a UK wide tour, including two sell-out gigs at the Dominion Theatre in London.

Alan Cruickshank later replaced Davie McCormick on drums, but the band split up before releasing their second single, Paint Yourself a Rainbow.

Johnson and Drummond went on to form The Forth Room, and Kevin McDermott went solo.

== Post-split releases ==
Stop the Rain, a compilation of unreleased material, was released in 2001 on Accident Records, and re-released in 2010 on Fastcut Records. Stop The Rain was re-released on Optic Nerve Recordings in April 2022, entering in at 39 in the singles chart.
