= Get Out and Walk =

Studio album by The Farmer's Boys
- Released: October 1983
- Genre: New wave
- Label: EMI

The Farmer's Boys chronology
Get Out and Walk (1983)	With These Hands (1985)

Get Out and Walk is the debut album by the Farmer's Boys, released in 1983. Initial copies came with a free 33.3rpm 12" with 12" versions of "For You", "Muck It Out", "Probably One of the Best Investments I Ever Made" and "Soft Drink". The album reached No. 49 on the UK Albums Chart.

== Track listing ==
1. "Matter of Fact"
2. "Probably One of the Best Investments I Ever Made"
3. "More Than a Dream"
4. "Woke Up This Morning"
5. "The Way You Made Me Cry"
6. "A Promise You Can't Keep"
7. "Soft Drink"
8. "Wailing Wall"
9. "For You"
10. "Torn in Two"
11. "Who Needs It"

== 2009 Expanded Version (bonus tracks) ==
1. "T.O.S.D."
2. "Drinking And Dressing Up"
3. "Something That I Ate"
4. "I Don't Know Why I Don't Like All My Friends"
5. "Muck It Out - Single Version"
6. "Funky Combine John"
7. "Probably One Of The Best Investments I Ever Made - 12" Version"
8. "For You - 12" Version"
9. "Soft Drink - 12" Version"
10. "Muck It Out - Extended Version"
