= La Cour des Grands (Do You Mind If I Play) =

Single by Youssou N'Dour and Axelle Red

from the album Music of the World Cup: Allez! Ola! Ole!
- Released: 1998
- Label: Sony Music Entertainment

La Cour des Grands is a song by Youssou N'Dour and Axelle Red that was chosen as the official anthem of the 1998 FIFA World Cup held in France.

The song’s title in English was "Do You Mind If I Play."
