= With These Hands (The Farmer's Boys album) =

Studio album by The Farmer's Boys
- Released: March 1985
- Genre: New wave
- Label: EMI

The Farmer's Boys chronology
Get Out and Walk (1983)	With These Hands (1985)	Once Upon a Time in the East (2003)

With These Hands is a 1985 studio album from the British band The Farmer's Boys.

== Track listing ==
1. "In the Country"
2. "I Built the World"
3. "Sport for All"
4. "Art Gallery"
5. "Something from Nothing"
6. "Phew Wow"
7. "All of a Sudden"
8. "Heartache"
9. "Walkabout"
10. "Whatever Is He Like"
