= Berlin Blondes =

- Origin: Glasgow, Scotland
- Genres: Synth-pop, new wave
- Years active: 1978–1981
- Labels: EMI, Scratch

Berlin Blondes were a new wave/synth-pop group from Glasgow which formed in 1978. They released an album in 1980 on the label EMI.

The band were influenced and inspired by Kraftwerk, Roxy Music and 'Berlin period' David Bowie. Live gigs saw the band covering such songs as Iggy Pop's "Funtime" and "Sister Midnight" and Kraftwerk's "The Model" as well as playing their own material. They built up a substantial following of fans, in and around Glasgow, due to their stylish live performances both as support act to bands like fellow Glaswegians Simple Minds, and as headliners in their own right of such venues as Glasgow's famous Mars Bar. Positive Noise founder and frontman Ross Middleton was an early fan, enthusing "Berlin Blondes are Fireball XL5" in a review he wrote of one of their gigs for Sounds (as Maxwell Park).

== History ==
The original line-up consisted of Steven Bonomi (vocals), Robert Farrell (guitar, synth), David Rudden (bass) and Jim Spender (a.k.a. Jim McKinven) (keyboards & synths). The band's sound was enhanced by the use of a drum machine which further added to their "Futurist/New Musik" tag at the time. They recorded their eponymous album (which was to be called 'Building on the Sand before a last minute change) at Rock City, Shepperton in January 1980. However, before the album's release, Rudden left due to "artistic differences" with Bonomi and McKinven and was replaced firstly by Russell Barrie for a very brief period in one or two gigs (Barrie is seen dressed in pink on the cover of their single "Science") and then by Nick Clark from Cuban Heels (Clark is credited on the album, although it was Rudden who played.) David Rudden went on to form Endgames.

In early 1980, the single "Science"/"Manikin" was released. "Manikin" was an instrumental version of the album track "Mannequin" which itself was inspired by Kraftwerk's "Showroom Dummies". The Mike Thorne produced album Berlin Blondes was released much later in the year (September 1980) along with the single "Framework"/"Zero Song". However, sales did not live up to expectations and the band was dropped from the label. Trouser Press reviewed the album (years after its original release) and rather haughtily describes it as "undistinguished, danceable hybrid synth/bass/drums clichés, occasionally adding colorful Sparks-like vocals for character." In truth, Bonomi's vocal style owed much more to Bryan Ferry and Cockney Rebel (Judy Teen era) than it did to Russell Mael. Many fans believed the album did not capture the power of the band's live performances whilst Robert Farrell stated that (as it was one of the first 'Futurist/New Musik' albums released) people were "not ready for it".

Their last incarnation saw them adding drummer Brian Miller and bassist Alasdair Gowans and releasing their last single "Marseille"/"The Poet" on independent label Scratch Records in 1981 before finally disbanding indefinitely.

== Post break-up careers ==
- Steven Bonomi is now an award-winning chef and restaurateur in Glasgow.
- Robert Farrell went on to play with The Wedding (among others) and is still in the music business. He lives in North London.
- Jim Spender/McKinven joined Altered Images, was in Dove/One Dove and lives in Glasgow.
- David Rudden is still involved in the music business and has more recently moved into collaborative art projects, examples of which can be seen on his "World of Found" website.

== Discography ==
=== Album ===
- Berlin Blondes (LP, EMI EMC-3346, September 1980)

=== Singles ===
- "Science"/"Manikin" (7", EMI EMI-5031, 1980)
- "Framework"/"Zero Song" (Instrumental Mix) (7", EMI EMI-5147, 1980; 12", EMI 12-EMI-5147, 1980)
- "Marseille"/"The Poet" (7", Scratch Records SCR-005, 1981)
