= The Uncle Devil Show (band) =

Folk-pop guitar band

- Origin: Scotland, UK
- Genres: Folk pop
- Years active: 2004 -
- Labels: P3 Music
- Members: Langton Herring; Jason Barr; Terrence

The Uncle Devil Show are a folk-pop guitar band formed as a side-project for three Scottish musicians, who use pseudonyms.

== History ==
In 2004, Kevin McDermott formed The Uncle Devil Show with Jim McDermott and Justin Currie. At the formation of the group, the members were anonymous, and the musicians credited as Langton Herring, Terrence, and Jason Barr, respectively. It was intended that the band retain their individual, hidden, identities for as long as possible during the marketing of the album. Justin Currie initially denied having anything to do with The Uncle Devil Show in a statement on the official Del Amitri website in February 2004. Kevin McDermott's website carried a similar denial. However, the label released the A Terrible Beauty CD with a jewel case sticker that read, "The stunning new band featuring Del Amitri frontman Justin Currie".

According to the band website, their premise was to "bring a universal message of intolerance and insularity which transcends all barriers". This message was incorporated into the language, and song themes, to a degree that prompted the label to release the CD with a parental advisory warning. The CD image was a facsimile of the I Want Candy LP sleeve by The Strangeloves and was designed by Glasgow Graphic Studio - Traffic Design Consultants.

In The Del Amitri Story, it is suggested of the "curious" A Terrible Beauty album, that Justin Currie’s fans "didn’t feel they were in on the joke". Regardless, the album was released to critical acclaim; John Murphy of musicOMH called the album "laugh out loud funny" and suggested that "songs such as I Had A Drink About You or She Cuts Her Own Fringe are at least the equal of anything the band members have been involved with before". Classic Rock magazine described A Terrible Beauty as "a hugely entertaining debut brimming with fine detail", and NME wrote that the album was "truly wonderful". Andy Morten of Shindig! magazine wrote that he had become 'addicted' to A Terrible Beauty to the extent that he played it each day, finding it laugh out loud funny. He continued that "the quality of the writing, playing and singing ... lift it so far above the pack, it can sometimes seem as though you’ve never heard people harmonising before". Morten further noted that A Terrible Beauty "contains the most profanities I’ve ever heard on a rock record, almost all of which still raise a smile 20-odd listens later".

== Albums ==
- A Terrible Beauty – released 19 April 2004

== Singles ==
- "She Cuts Her Own Fringe" – released 2004 (prior to album release)
