= Music of the World Cup: Allez! Ola! Ole! =

1998 compilation album by various artists

Music of the World Cup: Allez! Ola! Olé!

Compilation album by Various artists
- Released: 9 June 1998
- Recorded: 9 June 1998
- Genres: Rock, pop
- Length: 75:14
- Label: Sony Music Entertainment
- Producer: Sony Music Entertainment

Various artists chronology
Gloryland World Cup USA 94 (1994)	Music of the World Cup: Allez! Ola! Olé! (1998)	The Official Album of the 2002 FIFA World Cup (2002)

Singles from Allez! Ola! Ole!
- 1. "The Cup of Life" Released: March 3, 1998; 2. "Together Now" Released: April 22, 1998; 3. "La Cour des Grands (Do You Mind If I Play)" Released: June 6, 1998; 4. "Don't Come Home Too Soon" Released: June 17, 1998

Music of the World Cup: Allez! Ola! Olé! is a compilation album with various artists, released on 9 June 1998. This album is the official music album of the 1998 FIFA World Cup in France.

== Track listing ==
1. "The Cup of Life" – Ricky Martin (The Official 1998 FIFA World Cup Song)
2. "Do You Mind If I Play" – Youssou N'Dour & Axelle Red (The Official 1998 FIFA World Cup Anthem)
3. "I Love Football" (Cameroon) – Wes
4. "Rendez-Vous '98" (France & England) – Jean Michel Jarre & ApolloFourForty
5. "Oh Eh Oh Eh" (France) – Gipsy Kings
6. "País Tropical" (Brazil) – Daniela Mercury
7. "Tamborada" (Mexico) – Fey
8. "MaWe" (South Africa) – M'du
9. "Don't Come Home Too Soon" (Scotland) – Del Amitri
10. "Hot Legs" (Denmark) – M.A.T.C.H.
11. "Il Bello Della Vita" (Italy) – Spagna
12. "Pantera en Libertad" (Spain) – Monica Naranjo
13. "Rise Up" (Jamaica) – Jamaica United
14. "It's Only a Game" (Germany) – Jam & Spoon
15. "Together Now" (France & Japan) – Jean Michel Jarre & Tetsuya 'TK' Komuro
16. "Top of the World (Olé, Olé, Olé)" (England) – Chumbawamba
17. "É Uma Partida de Futebol" (Brazil) – Skank
18. "Los Sueños de Todo el Mundo" (Argentina) – Soledad
19. "Kick Off" (Netherlands) – Slagerij van Kampen
20. "Colors of the World" (Taiwan) – CoCo Lee
21. "Samba E Gol" (Germany) – Bellini
22. "La Copa de la Vida" (Spanish) – Ricky Martin

=== Charts ===
Chart (1998)	Peak position
German Albums (Offizielle Top 100)	29
Taiwanese International Albums (IFPI)	9

== See also ==
- List of FIFA World Cup songs and anthems
