= David Cummings (musician) =

British musician and scriptwriter

David Cummings (sometimes credited as Dave Cummings) is a British musician and scriptwriter. He is best known for writing for British television comedies such as The Fast Show, and for being a guitarist in Del Amitri between 1989 and 1995.

He was educated at Collyer’s School and the University of East Anglia, where he earned a degree in English & American Studies. It was while studying at the UEA that he met Paul Whitehouse and Charlie Higson, who later went on to create The Fast Show. At this time, however, Higson was mostly interested in music, and Cummings was a founder member of his band, The Higsons, who gained some cult popularity at the time.

After graduating, Cummings moved to London, where he continued playing guitar, notably in the cult band Bonsai Forest featuring Paul Whitehouse on lead guitar. In 1989 he joined the Scottish group Del Amitri after the departure of their guitarist Mick Slaven, being pictured on the cover of the 1990 album Waking Hours even though he joined after the material had already been recorded.

Cummings played on the next two Del Amitri albums, Change Everything in 1992 and Twisted in 1995, as well as on various tours, including an appearance at Woodstock '94. However, at the end of their United States tour of 1995, which saw them riding on the crest of a top ten hit there with the song Roll to Me, Cummings decided to leave the band. He thought all the touring might put a strain on his marital life, and his departure is documented - and somewhat dramatised - on the band's tongue-in-cheek 1996 tour diary video release Let's Go Home.

Even before his departure from the band, since 1994 Cummings had begun to move into scriptwriting, working with Whitehouse on material for comedian Harry Enfield's Harry Enfield and Chums sketch show broadcast on BBC One.

His friendship with Whitehouse and Higson led to Del Amitri appearing in an episode of their BBC Two sketch show The Fast Show in 1995, and after his departure from the band Cummings turned full-time to television scriptwriting.

As well as continuing to write for The Fast Show until its conclusion in 2000, Cummings co-wrote with Whitehouse the sitcom Happiness (BBC Two, 2000–01) and the feature film Kevin and Perry Go Large, which was a spin-off from Harry Enfield and Chums.

In 2014, he appeared in The Life of Rock with Brian Pern as John, the bassist of the fictional prog rock band Thotch.

In 2015, he helped co-write Paul Whitehouse's sitcom Nurse, based on his Radio 4 show of the same name, which debuted on BBC 2 on 10 March.
