= Don't Come Home Too Soon =

1998 single by Del Amitri

Single by Del Amitri

from the album Music of the World Cup: Allez! Ola! Ole!
- B-side: "Paper Thin (Ambient Mix)"
- Released: 1 June 1998
- Recorded: 1998
- Length: 4:00
- Label: A&M
- Songwriter: Justin Currie
- Producer: Pete Smith

Del Amitri singles chronology
"Some Other Sucker's Parade"" (1997)	"Don't Come Home Too Soon" (1998)	"Cry to Be Found" (1998)

"Don't Come Home Too Soon" was a song released by Scottish band Del Amitri to mark the Scottish football team's qualification for the 1998 World Cup in France. The single reached No. 15 on the UK Singles Chart and topped the Scottish Singles Chart in June 1998.

== Music video ==
The music video shows Scotland fans waiting on a delayed flight to Paris and was filmed at Prestwick Airport.

== Chart success ==
The single topped the Scottish Singles Chart for the week of 7 June 1998. On the UK Singles Chart the same week, the song debuted at No. 15, its peak position.

== Charts ==
Chart (1998)	Peak position
Scotland Singles (OCC)	1
UK Singles (OCC)	15
