= Nothing Ever Happens =

Single by Del Amitri

from the album Waking Hours
- Released: 1 January 1990
- Genre: Folk rock
- Length: 3:53
- Label: A&M
- Songwriter: Justin Currie
- Producer: Hugh Jones

Del Amitri singles chronology
"Stone Cold Sober" (1989)	"Nothing Ever Happens" (1990)	"Kiss This Thing Goodbye" (1990)

Music video
- Del Amitri - "Nothing Ever Happens" (Official Video) on YouTube

"Nothing Ever Happens" is a song by the Scottish alternative rock band Del Amitri.

Released as a single on 1 January 1990 by A&M Records, it reached #11 in the UK Singles Chart, becoming the band's biggest hit in the UK; and was also a top-10 hit in Ireland, peaking at #4. It is the last track on the band's second studio album, Waking Hours (1989).

== Track listing ==
A-side

- "Nothing Ever Happens"

B-side

- "So Many Souls To Change"
- "Don't I Look Like The Kind Of Guy You Used To Hate"
- "Evidence"
