= Roll to Me =

1995 single by Del Amitri

Single by Del Amitri

from the album Twisted
- B-side: "In the Frame"; "Food for Songs" (acoustic); "One Thing Left to Do" (acoustic)
- Released: 26 June 1995
- Genre: Pop rock
- Length: 2:12
- Label: A&M
- Songwriter: Justin Currie
- Producer: Al Clay

Del Amitri singles chronology
"Driving with the Brakes On" (1995)	"Roll to Me" (1995)	"Tell Her This" (1996)

Audio
- "Roll to Me" on YouTube

"Roll to Me" is a song by Scottish pop rock band Del Amitri, released in June 1995 by A&M Records as the third single from their fourth studio album, Twisted (1995). The song became their biggest hit in the United States when it reached number 10 on the Billboard Hot 100 chart. It finished at number 55 on the Billboard Year-End Hot 100 singles chart of 1995. In the United Kingdom, it was a moderate hit, peaking at number 22 on the UK Singles Chart.

== Track listings ==
- UK CD1
1. "Roll to Me"
2. "In the Frame"
3. "Food for Songs" (acoustic version)
4. "One Thing Left to Do" (acoustic version)
- UK CD2
1. "Roll to Me"
2. "Spit in the Rain"
3. "Stone Cold Sober"
4. "Move Away Jimmy Blue"
- UK cassette single and European CD single
1. "Roll to Me"
2. "In the Frame"
- US CD single
1. "Roll to Me" – 2:12
2. "Long Way Down" – 3:29
3. "Scared to Live" – 4:44
4. "Someone Else Will" – 4:48
- US cassette single

A. "Roll to Me" (LP version)
B. "Long Way Down"

== Charts ==
=== Weekly charts ===
Chart (1995)	Peak position
Canada Top Singles (RPM)	5
Europe (European Hit Radio)	38
Iceland (Íslenski Listinn Topp 40)	40
Scottish Singles Sales (Official Charts)	10
UK Singles (Official Charts)	22
UK Airplay (Music Week)	4
US Billboard Hot 100	10
US Adult Contemporary (Billboard)	4
US Adult Top 40 (Billboard)	1
US Top 40/Mainstream (Billboard)	8
US Cash Box Top 100	7

=== Year-end charts ===
Chart (1995)	Position
Canada Top Singles (RPM)	48
UK Airplay (Music Week)	16
US Billboard Hot 100	55
US Adult Contemporary (Billboard)	34
US Top 40/Mainstream (Billboard)	26
US Cash Box Top 100	48

Chart (1996)	Position
US Adult Contemporary (Billboard)	17
US Adult Top 40 (Billboard)	8
US Top 40/Mainstream (Billboard)	87

== Release history ==
Region	Date	Format(s)	Label(s)	Ref.
United States	12 June 1995	Alternative radio	A&M	
United States	13 June 1995	Contemporary hit radio	A&M	
Australia	26 June 1995	CD; cassette	A&M	
United Kingdom	26 June 1995	CD; cassette	A&M	
