= Del Amitri =

Scottish alternative rock band

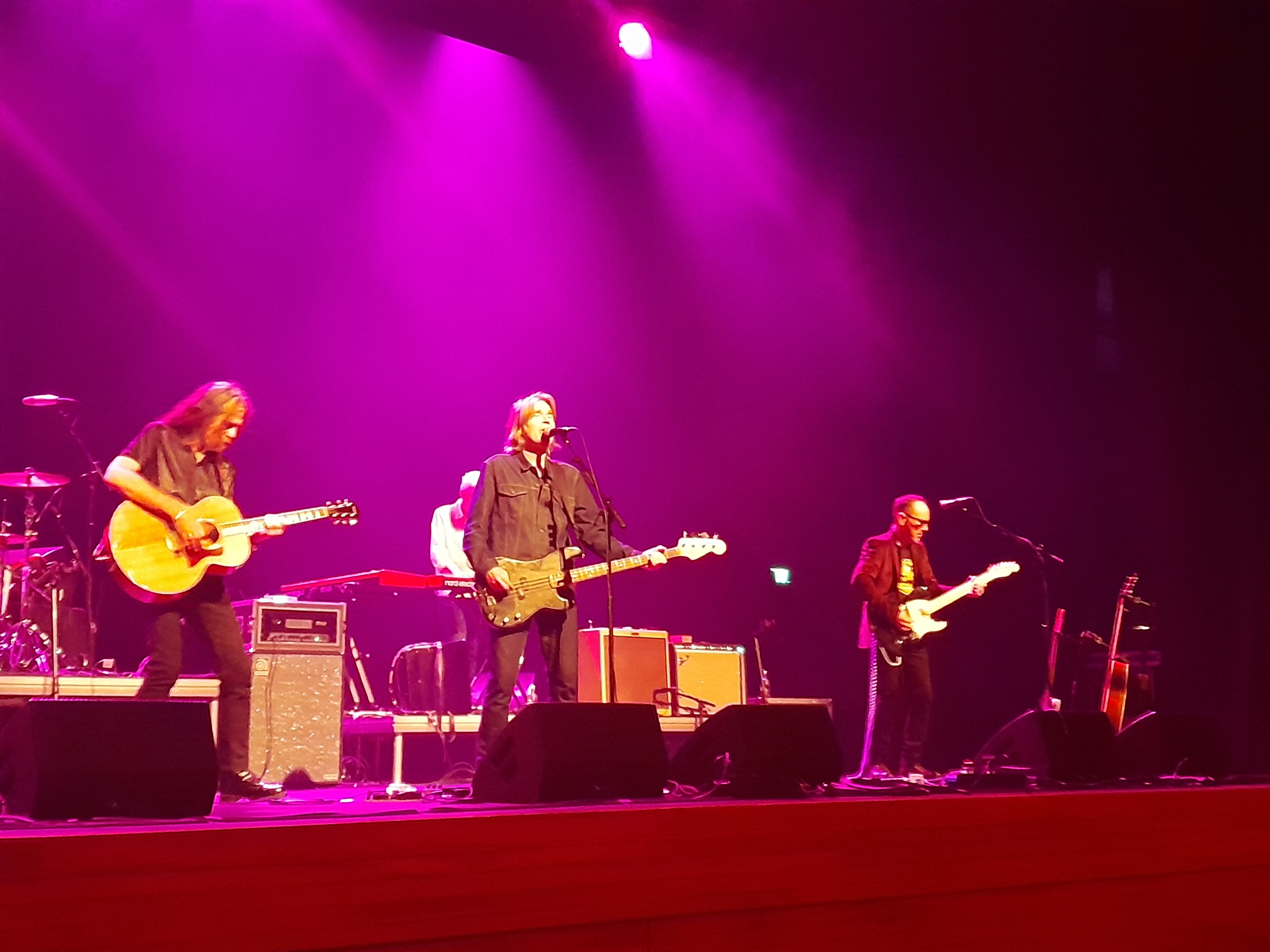
- Del Amitri performing in Christchurch, 2023

Background information
- Origin: Glasgow, Scotland
- Genres: Alternative rock; pop rock; jangle pop; roots rock; folk rock
- Works: Discography
- Years active: 1980–2002; 2013–present
- Labels: NoStrings; Chrysalis; A&M; Mercury; Cooking Vinyl
- Spinoffs: The Uncle Devil Show
- Members: Justin Currie; Iain Harvie; Andy Alston; Jim McDermott; Kris Dollimore
- Past members: Kevin McDermott; Donald Bentley; James M Scobbie; Paul Tyagi; Bryan Tolland; Mick Slaven; David Cummings; Brian McDermott; Jon McLoughin; Mark Price; Ash Soan
- Website: delamitri.info

Del Amitri are a Scottish alternative rock band formed in Glasgow in 1980. They are best known for their 1990 single "Nothing Ever Happens", which reached No. 11 in the UK, and their 1995 hit "Roll to Me", which reached the top 10 in both Canada and the United States. They have released seven studio albums, five of which have reached the UK top 10. Del Amitri has sold over six million albums worldwide.

== History ==
=== Band name ===
Del Amitri's founding member and main songwriter, Justin Currie, explained in 2010 that the band's name "was invented to be meaningless – basically a corruption of the Greek name 'Dimitri'." In 2018, Currie clarified that 'Del Amitri' is a bastardisation of the name of a film producer who appeared in the closing credits of a film he saw in 1979: "probably Dimitri-something, but we couldn't remember... so eventually through osmosis or maybe Chinese Whispers 'Dimitri' became 'Del Amitri'." Many sources have repeated a claim that the name was chosen because it is Greek for "from the womb", but this is untrue.

=== Del Amitri (1985) ===
In 1984, Del Amitri signed a recording contract with Chrysalis Records, which released their eponymous debut studio album in 1985.

=== Waking Hours (1989) ===
As recording started for what would become Del Amitri's second studio album, the line-up changed. Currie and Harvie invited keyboard player Andy Alston to join the band and fired both guitarist Bryan Tolland and drummer Paul Tyagi. Tolland was replaced in the studio by Mick Slaven and Tyagi by the Commotions' Stephen Irvine. However, Slaven and Irvine chose not to join the band full-time and were replaced by David Cummings and Brian McDermott, respectively.

Released in 1989, Waking Hours reached No. 6 on the UK Albums Chart and gave the band their most successful UK single, "Nothing Ever Happens", which peaked at No. 11. They also gained some mainstream exposure abroad for the first time, as Waking Hours was a success in several territories with the single "Kiss This Thing Goodbye" flirting with the lower reaches of the US Billboard Hot 100's Top 40. In between Waking Hours and their next album, the band released the single "Spit in the Rain", which reached No. 21 in the UK.

=== Change Everything (1992) ===
The line-up of Currie, Harvie, Alston, Cummings and McDermott proved to be stable and successful. They stayed together to record the follow-up album Change Everything, which was released in 1992 and became the band's biggest chart success, reaching No. 2 in the UK, being held off top spot only by Lionel Richie's best-of collection, Back to Front. The single "Always the Last to Know" peaked at No. 13 in the UK, and again provided them with an entry into Top 40 in the US. The video for the song was directed by Oil Factory's Pedro Romhanyi. Their increasing success in the US led to appearances on the television show Late Night with David Letterman and the Woodstock '94 anniversary festival.

=== Twisted (1995) ===
Twisted was released in 1995 and peaked at No. 3 in the UK. Ash Soan joined the band as a permanent member after touring with them on drums starting in 1994; although on the album, drums were played by Chris Sharrock.

The single "Roll to Me", only a moderate hit in the UK where it reached No. 22, reached the Top 10 in the US charts; this was a noteworthy achievement during an era when British acts were finding success in the US difficult.

=== Some Other Sucker's Parade (1997) ===
Del Amitri's fifth studio album, Some Other Sucker's Parade, was released in 1997 and reached No. 6 in the UK chart.

The band found it harder to capitalise on their previous successes in the US, however, and lost out on more airplay at home when their record company took the decision to withdraw the album's planned third single "Medicine" in September 1997, putting out a false press story that the lyrics could be interpreted as a critique of the then recently deceased Diana, Princess of Wales.

Five years passed before Del Amitri released another album. In 1998, however, they recorded the official anthem for the Scottish World Cup squad, "Don't Come Home Too Soon". They also released a best of album, Hatful of Rain: The Best of Del Amitri, which was a No. 5 success in the UK Albums Chart and was accompanied by a new track, "Cry to Be Found", which reached No. 40.

=== Can You Do Me Good? (2002) ===
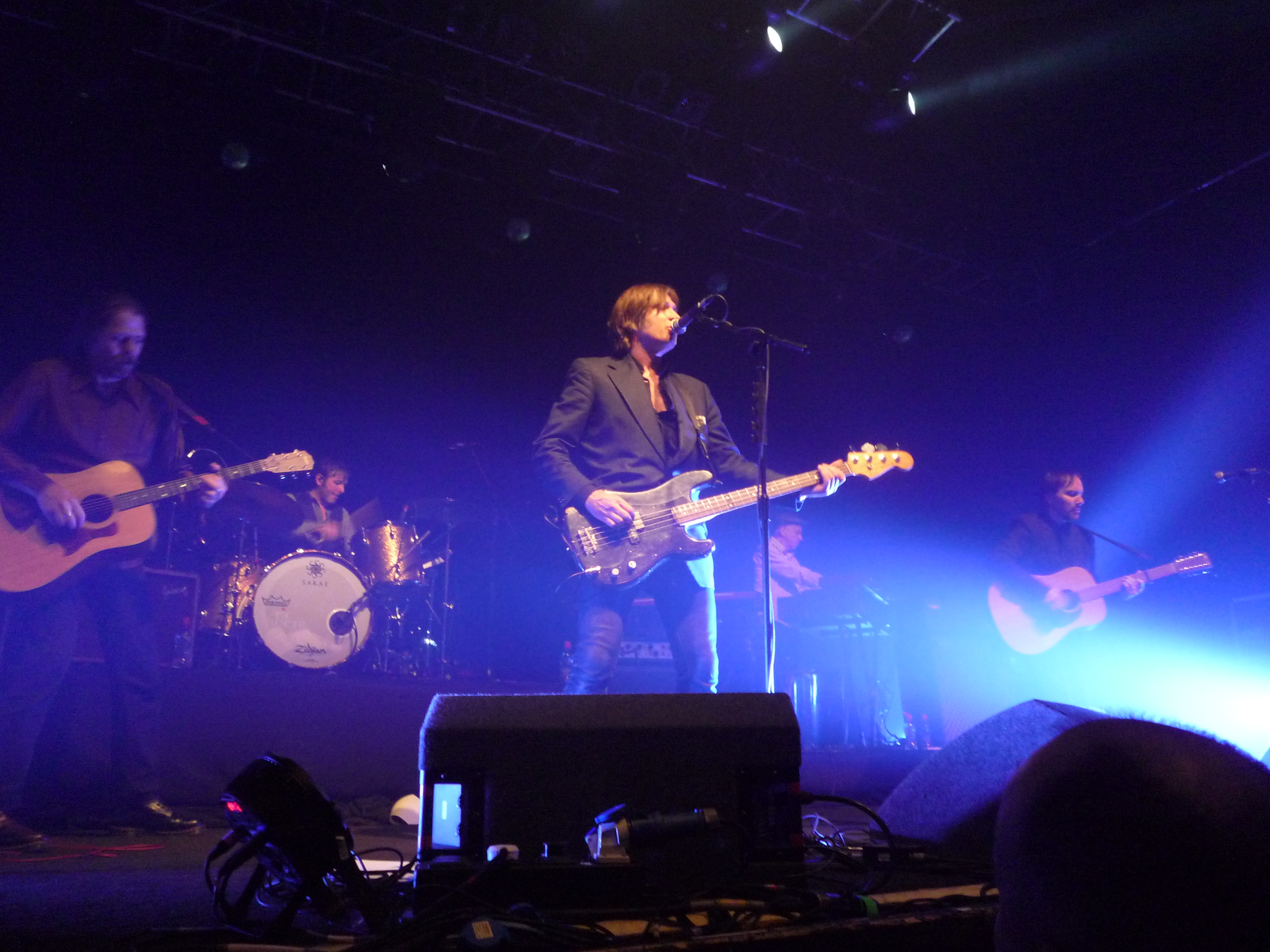
The 2014 tour line-up of Del Amitri performing at Vicar Street in Dublin

The album Can You Do Me Good? was released in the spring of 2002. Both the album and the single "Just Before You Leave", reached the Top 40. The band then went on hiatus.

=== Reunion tours (2014, 2018) ===
On 18 August 2013, during an interview with Terry Wogan on his BBC Radio 2 programme, Currie hinted at a Del Amitri reunion. A UK tour was subsequently announced. As part of the tour, the band played to 8,000 people in the SSE Hydro, Glasgow on 24 January 2014. A live album, called Into the Mirror, was released following the tour.

Del Amitri reformed again in July 2018, playing eight dates in seven UK cities. Their live set included a new song, "You Can't Go Back", and a cover of Twenty One Pilots' hit song, "Heathens". In July 2018, Currie said that a new group album and further activity was possible.

=== Fatal Mistakes (2021) ===
On 2 March 2020, drummer Ash Soan revealed that work on Del Amitri's seventh studio album had begun at Vada Studios in Cookhill, Worcestershire. On 8 April, Justin Currie confirmed that the band finished recording the album "the night before the UK-wide lockdown" began on 24 March, and that they expected to tour in January 2021, following a one-off free show in December 2020 for NHS Scotland workers. On 5 May via a short video clip, the band announced that they had signed to Cooking Vinyl.

In November 2020, the band announced new single "Close Your Eyes and Think of England" and released the album title Fatal Mistakes. The album was released by Cooking Vinyl on 28 May 2021 alongside bonus album Outtakes & B-side (the latter of which is available for a limited period with the parent album). In its first week of release, Fatal Mistakes landed at No. 5 on the UK Album Chart, marking the band's sixth album to reach the UK Top 10.

Del Amitri announced a tour in support of Fatal Mistakes will begin in September 2021, concluding with a hometown show at Glasgow on 20 December 2021.

Del Amitri announced through their Instagram that a new documentary on the band had been made entitled "You Can't Go Back". The film is set to premiere on British TV channel Sky Arts on September 4.

=== Every Night Has a Dawn (2022) ===
On 12 December 2022, Justin Currie and Ian Harvie appeared at the launch of the Blu-ray disc Every Night Has a Dawn at the Glasgow Film Theatre where they took part in a Q&A session following the showing of excerpts of the film which was recorded live at the Barrowland Ballroom in Glasgow on the third night of a tour finale on 11 June 2022.

=== Simple Minds tour (2024) ===
The band joined fellow Glasgow band Simple Minds for their 2024 World Tour, for the UK and European legs, with dates between 15 March in Leeds to 29 March in Glasgow plus European shows in Luxembourg, Holland, Denmark, Germany, France and Italy.

== Members ==
Current members

- Justin Currie – lead vocals, bass, acoustic guitar (1980–2002, 2013–present)
- Iain Harvie – guitar, backing vocals, occasional bass (1982–2002, 2013–present)
- Andy Alston – keyboards, accordion (1989–2002, 2013–present)
- Kris Dollimore – guitar, backing vocals, occasional bass (1997–2002, 2013–present)
- Jim McDermott – drums, percussion (2021–present)

Former members

- Donald Bentley – guitar, backing vocals (1980–1982)
- James Scobbie – guitar, backing vocals (1980–1982)
- Paul Tyagi – drums, percussion (1981–1988)
- Bryan Tolland – guitar, backing vocals (1982–1987)
- Mick Slaven – guitar, backing vocals (1988–1989)
- Brian McDermott – drums, percussion (1989–1994)
- David Cummings – guitar, backing vocals (1989–1995)
- Jon McLoughlin – guitar, backing vocals (1996–1997, died 2005)
- Mark Price – drums, percussion (1997–2002)
- Ashley Soan – drums, percussion (1994–1997, 2013–2021)
- Mick Ozkor - One off gig in St Louis 1996

Timeline

== Discography ==
=== Studio albums ===
- del Amitri (1985)
- Waking Hours (1989)
- Change Everything (1992)
- Twisted (1995)
- Some Other Sucker's Parade (1997)
- Can You Do Me Good? (2002)
- Fatal Mistakes (2021)

=== Compilation albums ===
- The Best of Del Amitri: Hatful of Rain (1998)
- Lousy with Love: The B-Sides (1998)
- 20th Century Masters – The Best of Del Amitri (2003)
- The Collection: Best of Del Amitri (2007)

=== Live albums ===
- Into the Mirror: Del Amitri Live in Concert (2014)
- Every Night Has a Dawn (2022)
