= Mick Slaven =

Scottish musician

Michael Slaven (born 4 December 1961) is a session guitarist and record producer from Glasgow, Scotland.

A former gardener at the University of Glasgow, Slaven became the guitarist for Bourgie Bourgie in the 1980s, and was briefly a member of Del Amitri. He has worked with Ricky Ross of Deacon Blue, Eighteenth after Trinity and Pearlfishers, and wrote the music for the Traverse Theatre Edinburgh's production of Stephen Greenhorn's play, Passing Places, which he played live. Slaven later composed the guitar score for Gregory Burke's play, Gagarin Way, also for The Traverse.

Slaven also fronts his own band, The Leopards, who released the album They Tried Staying Calm. The Leopards did two sessions for John Peel in 1997 and 1998.

The Leopards have appeared as live backing band for ex Josef K guitarist Malcolm Ross, and in August 2008, guested for an Edinburgh show with former Josef K vocalist Paul Haig.

Slaven produced James Kirk's 2003 album You Can Make It If You Boogie, with the Leopards providing the musical backing.
