= Justin Currie =

Scottish musician (born 1964)

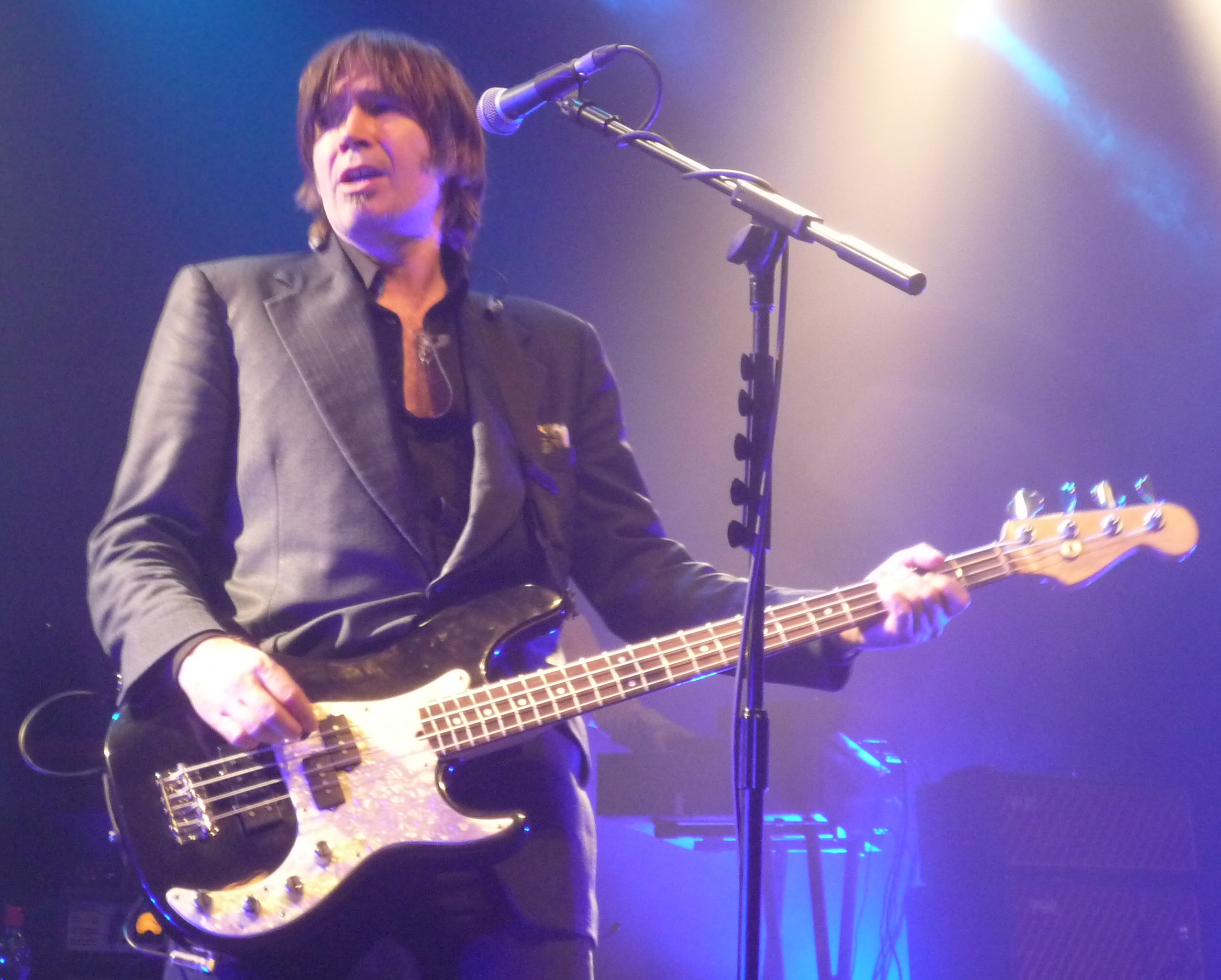
- Currie performing with Del Amitri at Vicar Street in Dublin, Ireland, 2014

Background information
- Born: Justin Robert Currie; 11 December 1964 (age 61)
- Origin: Glasgow, Scotland
- Genres: Pop rock; power pop; jangle pop; alternative rock; folk rock
- Occupations: Singer; songwriter
- Instruments: Vocals; guitar; bass; piano
- Years active: 1983–present
- Member of: Del Amitri; The Uncle Devil Show
- Website: justincurrie.com

Justin Robert Currie (born 11 December 1964) is a Scottish singer and songwriter best known as a founding member of the alternative rock band Del Amitri.

== Career ==
=== Del Amitri ===
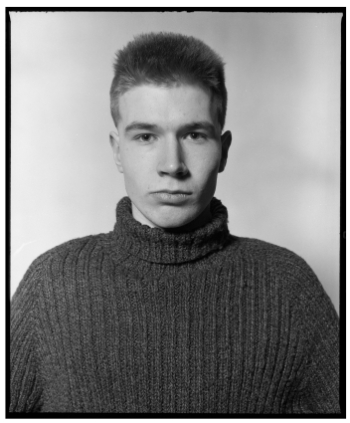
Currie, 1984

Justin Currie was born in Glasgow and established the band Del Amitri in the early 1980s after putting up a sign in a music shop asking for other people who could play instruments to get in contact with him. In addition to being the lead vocalist and principal songwriter of the band, Currie also plays bass with them. Between 1985 and 2002, the band released six studio albums. Their single, "Nothing Ever Happens" reached No. 11 in the UK, and their 1995 single "Roll to Me" reached the top ten in both Canada and the US. Five Del Amitri albums have reached the Top 10 in the UK. Globally, Del Amitri have sold six million albums.

=== The Uncle Devil Show ===
Justin Currie with Kevin and Jim McDermott released the studio album A Terrible Beauty under the moniker the Uncle Devil Show in 2004.

=== Solo career ===
In addition to his career with Del Amitri, Currie is also a solo artist. In 2006 he was a special guest on Tom McRae's Hotel Cafe Tour. In 2005 he wrote and recorded an album with the working title Rebound. It was subsequently re-titled What Is Love For and released on Rykodisc on 8 October 2007. A single and extended play (EP) from the album, "No, Surrender", was released on 24 March 2008.

Currie's second solo studio album The Great War was released on 3 May 2010, a single titled "A Man with Nothing to Do" was released on 26 April 2010.

A third solo studio album, titled Lower Reaches, recorded in Texas, and was released on 19 August 2013. It is preceded by a free download of the track "Little Stars", plus a track released to radio in July 2013, "Bend to My Will". The album reached number 46 in the UK Albums Chart.

In 2017, he released his fourth studio album, This Is My Kingdom Now.

== Family and personal life ==
Currie’s father, John Currie, was chorusmaster of the Royal Scottish National Orchestra Chorus from 1965 to 1984 and music director of the Los Angeles Master Chorale from 1986 to 1991.

Currie's cousin is singer-songwriter Nick Currie, known as "Momus".

As of 2013 Currie had been in a relationship for 13 years with his girlfriend Emma.

In 2024, Currie revealed that he had been diagnosed with Parkinson's disease.

== Discography ==
- What Is Love For (2007) – UK number 106
- The Great War (2010) – UK number 90
- Lower Reaches (2013) – UK number 46
- This Is My Kingdom Now (2017) – UK number 54
