= Iain Harvie =

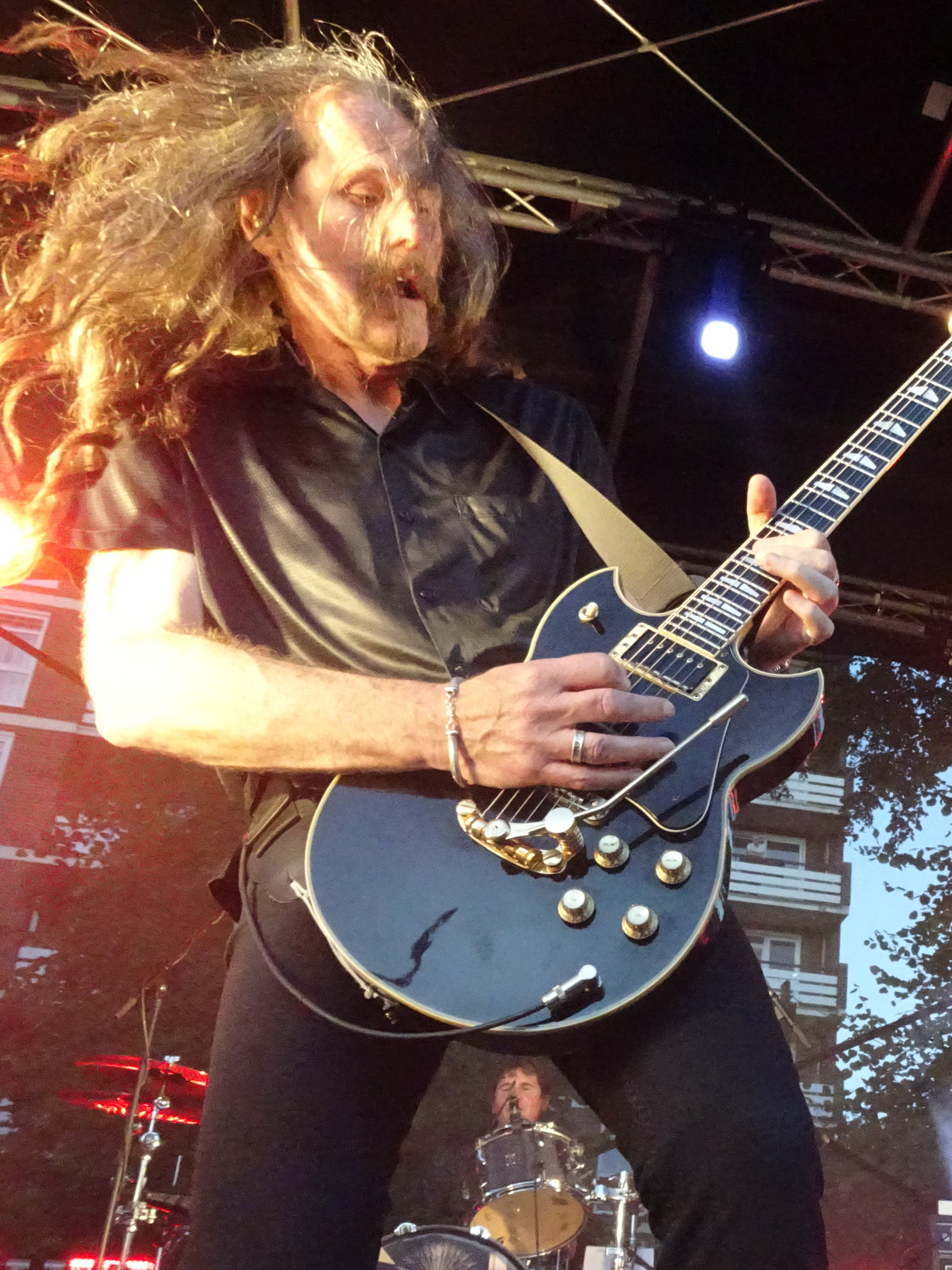
- Harvie in 2023

Background information
- Born: Iain Wallace Harvie; 19 May 1962 (age 63); Hamilton, Lanarkshire, Scotland
- Origin: Glasgow, Scotland
- Genres: Rock
- Instruments: Guitar
- Member of: Del Amitri

Iain Wallace Harvie (born 19 May 1962) is a Scottish guitarist and a member of the alternative rock band Del Amitri. Along with lead singer and bassist Justin Currie, Harvie is one of only two members to be present throughout Del Amitri's history since its 1982 inception. He is also the co-writer, with Currie, of many of the group's songs.

Harvie now works as a record producer on albums with both Eileen Rose and The Maccabees. In 2000, Harvie was married and in September 2001, he and his wife Madeleine had a boy, Louis.
