= List of the Godfathers band members =

The Godfathers are an English rock band from London, England. Formed in 1985, the group originally featured vocalist Peter Coyne, guitarists Mike Gibson and Kris Dollimore, bassist Chris Coyne and drummer George Mazur. The group has gone through many lineup changes, with Peter Coyne as the only constant member.

== History ==
=== 1985–2001 ===
The Godfathers were formed in 1985 in London, England, by lead singer Peter Coyne and his bass-playing younger brother Chris. After the breakup of their previous band the Sid Presley Experience, which released two singles in 1984, the Coyne brothers recruited guitarists Mike Gibson and Kris Dollimore, and drummer George Mazur. Calling themselves the Godfathers, the new band released the Capo Di Tutti Capi EP and two singles between November 1985 and September 1986 on their own Corporate Image label. The band's first album, Hit by Hit, followed in November 1986, and consisted of the A and B-sides of the EP and two singles plus a previously unreleased track.

February 1987 non-album single, "Love Is Dead", was followed by the albums Birth, School, Work, Death (February, 1988) and More Songs About Love and Hate (May, 1989), by which time the band had signed to Epic Records. Kris Dollimore left the band in late 1989 and was replaced by Chris Burrows the following year. In the spring and summer of 1990, the new lineup recorded Unreal World, which was released in March 1991. George Mazur left shortly after the album's release to be replaced by Ali Byworth. The band's first live album, Dope, Rock 'n' Roll and Fucking in the Streets, was recorded in February 1992 and released on Corporate Image the same year. It is the first Godfathers recording to feature Byworth and the final with Mike Gibson, who left the band later in the year.

Reduced to a four-piece, the Godfathers signed with German label Intercord and released The Godfathers in 1993. The album would also be known as The Orange Album due to the citrus fruit that appeared on the cover. Burrows and Byworth left in 1995, and a new lineup featuring drummer Grant Nicholas and guitarists Paul Ronney and Ricky Newson recorded 1995's Afterlife, the band's second and final Intercord release. By 1998, Ronney, Newson and Nicholas had left the Godfathers, who carried on with a changing lineup. With interest in the band slowly fading, the Godfathers broke up in 2000. The band, however, reunited for two tribute shows in February 2001 and March 2002 for touring bassist Sam Powell, who died in 2001.

=== 2008–present ===
The Godfathers' original members reformed for a reunion tour in 2008, but by 2009 the lineup had changed to feature Peter and Chris Coyne, former Sid Presley Experience guitarist Del Bartle, and a returning Grant Nicholas on drums. The new lineup recorded the live album Shot Live at the 100 Club, released by Secret Records Limited in November 2010. It was followed in March 2013 by the band's first studio album in eighteen years, Jukebox Fury, released, like all subsequent releases, through the band's own label, Godfathers Recordings. Nicholas had left the band during the recording sessions for Jukebox Fury to be replaced by Dave Twigg, and Bartle, who left in 2014, was replaced by two new guitarists, Steve Crittall and Mauro Venegas. This lineup recorded the June 2015 double A-side vinyl single "Rewind Time"/"Till My Heart Stops Beating" before Chris Coyne left the band in 2016. With new bassist Darren Birch the band recorded A Big Bad Beautiful Noise, released in February 2017.

The band's third live album, This Is War! The Godfathers Live!, was recorded in December 2017, by which time Venegas had been replaced by Alex McBain, and released in April 2019. In August 2019, Coyne fired the entire band and quickly assembled a new band consisting of bassist Jon Priestley, guitarists Richie Simpson and Wayne Vermaak, who was soon replaced with Paul Humphreys and drummer Billy Duncanson. The new lineup's first release was the double A-side single "I'm Not Your Slave"/"Wild and Free" in June 2020. The album Alpha Beta Gamma Delta was released in September 2022, with the four-track Midnight Rider EP released ahead of the album in August, including two non-album tracks.

== Members ==
=== Present members ===
Name	Years active	Instruments	Release contributions
Peter Coyne	1985–2000; 2001; 2002; 2008–present	lead vocals	All Godfathers releases
Jon Priestley	2019–present	bass; guitar; backing vocals	Alpha Beta Gamma Delta (2022)
Richie Simpson	2019–present	guitar; backing vocals	Alpha Beta Gamma Delta (2022)
Paul Humphreys	2019–present	guitar; backing vocals	Alpha Beta Gamma Delta (2022)
Billy Duncanson	2019–present	drums; backing vocals	Alpha Beta Gamma Delta (2022)

=== Former members ===
Name	Years active	Instruments	Release contributions
Chris Coyne	1985–2000; 2008–2016	bass; guitar; keyboards; accordion; backing vocals; occasional lead vocals	Hit by Hit (1986); Birth, School, Work, Death (1988); More Songs About Love and Hate (1989); Unreal World (1991); Dope, Rock 'n' Roll and Fucking in the Streets (1992); The Godfathers (1993); Afterlife (1995); Shot Live at the 100 Club (2011); Jukebox Fury (2013)
Kris Dollimore	1985–1989; 2008–2009	guitar; backing vocals	Hit by Hit (1986); Birth, School, Work, Death (1988); More Songs About Love and Hate (1989)
Mike Gibson	1985–1992; 2008–2009	guitar; backing vocals	Hit by Hit (1986); Birth, School, Work, Death (1988); More Songs About Love and Hate (1989); Unreal World (1991); Dope, Rock 'n' Roll and Fucking in the Streets (1992)
George Mazur	1985–1991; 2008–2009	drums; percussion; backing vocals	Hit by Hit (1986); Birth, School, Work, Death (1988); More Songs About Love and Hate (1989); Unreal World (1991)
Chris Burrows	1990–1995	guitar; backing vocals	Unreal World (1991); Dope, Rock 'n' Roll and Fucking in the Streets (1992); The Godfathers (1993)
Ali Byworth	1991–1995	drums; percussion; backing vocals	Dope, Rock 'n' Roll and Fucking in the Streets (1992); The Godfathers (1993)
Paul Ronney (aka Paul-Ronney Angel)	1994–1997; 2000; 2001	guitar; harmonica; backing vocals	Afterlife (1995)
Ricky Newson (aka Ronnie Rocka)	1995-c. 1998	guitar; backing vocals	Afterlife (1995)
Grant Nicholas	1995-1998; 2009–2012	drums; percussion; backing vocals	Afterlife (1995); Shot Live at the 100 Club (2011); Jukebox Fury (2013)
Del Bartle	2009–2014	guitar; bass; keyboards; backing vocals; occasional lead vocals	Shot Live at the 100 Club (2011); Jukebox Fury (2013)
Dave Twigg	2012-2014	drums	Jukebox Fury (2013)
Mauro Venegas	2014-2017	guitar; backing vocals	A Big Bad Beautiful Noise (2017)
Steve Crittall	2014-2019	guitar; backing vocals	A Big Bad Beautiful Noise (2017); This Is War! The Godfathers Live! (2019)
Tim James	2014-2019	drums; backing vocals	A Big Bad Beautiful Noise (2017); This Is War! The Godfathers Live! (2019)
Darren Birch	2016-2019	bass; backing vocals	A Big Bad Beautiful Noise (2017); This Is War! The Godfathers Live! (2019)
Alex McBain	2017-2019	guitar; backing vocals	This Is War! The Godfathers Live! (2019)

=== Other contributors ===
Name	Years active	Instruments	Details
Les Riggs	1998	drums	Riggs toured with the Godfathers in 1998.
Sam Powell	2000	bass	Powell toured with the Godfathers in 2000.
Igor	2000; 2001	drums	Igor toured with the Godfathers in 2000 and performed at a tribute gig for Sam Powell in 2001.
James Sterling	2001	guitar	Sterling performed at a tribute gig for Sam Powell in 2001.
Gary Mills	2001	bass	Mills performed at a tribute gig for Sam Powell in 2001.
Jason Pegg	2017	guitar	Pegg toured with the Godfathers in 2017.
Wayne Vermaak	2017	Guitar	performed a tour with Godfathers and contributed to, alpha beta gamma delta
