= Eileen Rose =

American singer-songwriter (born 1965)

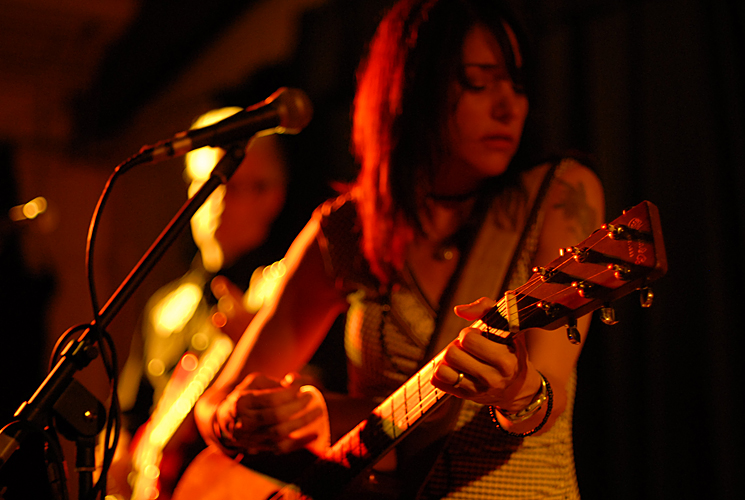
- photo by Jez Brown

Background information
- Born: Eileen Rose Giadone; January 31, 1965 (age 61); Boston, Massachusetts, United States
- Genres: Americana, rock, indie, roots, folk, alternative country, classic country, honky tonk
- Occupations: Musician, songwriter
- Instruments: Vocals guitar keyboards piano harmonica
- Years active: c.1990–present
- Labels: Rough Trade, Floating World
- Website: eileenrose.com

Eileen Rose (born January 31, 1965) is an American singer-songwriter who is known for her eclectic Americana music. She has released 12 solo studio albums and toured Europe and the US extensively with her band The Holy Wreck. She is also a member of the band The Silver Threads.

== Early years ==
Born Eileen Rose Giadone, in the north Boston suburb of Saugus, Massachusetts, Rose grew up in a close-knit Italian-Irish American family with five older sisters and three brothers. She started writing songs as a teenager and taught herself to read music and play the guitar. Waitressing to put herself through college, Rose began to study criminal law, but gave it up to begin performing on the local Boston music scene. She released a self-funded folk album and fronted the indie-rock bands Daisy Chain, Medici Slot Machine and then Fledgling.

== Career ==
=== 1991–2003: UK and Rough Trade years ===
In 1991, Rose moved to the UK, living in north London. With Fledgling, she played on the London club circuit and toured the US east coast. Fledgling signed to Nine Inch Nail's TVT label and released one self-titled album in 1995, before disbanding. The Fledgling song "August" featured on the soundtrack of the Sandra Bullock / Denis Leary movie Two If by Sea. When Fledgling split, Rose moved into an old cottage on a dairy farm in Essex and began to write and demo what she has described as "very personal songs" that would form the core of her first two albums. After a year or two, she decided to try performing them solo and started booking gigs. At a gig at the Weavers Arms, Rose was approached by Larry Love of Alabama 3, leader of the headlining Larry Love Show Band. He liked her set and offered his band to back her for a few shows. Geoff Travis from the seminal UK record label Rough Trade Records saw them play and offered Rose a solo deal. Rose released two albums and an EP on Rough Trade, both of which were well received by critics.

Rose's debut album, Shine Like It Does, was originally released in the UK in October 2000. The record was recorded in Monnow Valley studio, near Monmouth in Wales, and featured three members of Alabama 3 – guitarist Mark Sams, keyboard player Orlando Harrison and Simon "Sir Eddie Real" Edwards on drums. David Bull, the lead guitarist in Fledgling, and Barry Payne, the former bass player for Wreckless Eric, also played on it. The album was engineered and co-produced by Jerry Boys (The Beatles, Pink Floyd and Buena Vista Social Club). Shine Like It Does was re-released in 2001, with a different cover and shrink-wrapped with a new EP. The Party Dress EP was recorded with Iain Harvie (of Del Amitri) and Kris Dollimore (Del Amitri, The Godfathers) in their studio in Rochester, Kent. US label Compass, run by Grammy-winning banjo-player Alison Brown, added three of the tracks from that EP to Shine Like It Does when they released it in the US that April.

The song "Shining", which gives Shine Like It Does its title, featured in the Disney movie The Rookie and is also on the soundtrack album along with Ryan Adams and Steve Earle. "Lie To Me" was featured in an episode of the TV series Felicity.

In October 2000 Rose opened for Ryan Adams on his UK tour. She started 2001 with a three-week residency at London's Borderline club, then toured the UK with Eddi Reader. She opened for Ron Sexsmith on his US tour in July 2001, and his tour of Ireland that November.

Rose's second album, Long Shot Novena, was released in February 2002 through Rough Trade in the UK and Compass records in the US. It was recorded at Troy Town Studios in Rochester, Kent, with Harvie and Dollimore using guest musicians including Bull, Payne, Harrison and Del Amitri drummer Mark Price. The Sex Pistols' Glen Matlock and The Ruts' Seggs both feature on bass. Long Shot Novena saw Rose experimenting with sequencing and drum programming for the first time. The UK's Daily Mirror newspaper described the album's sound as "spit 'n' sawdust country filtered through the Velvet Underground". In support of the album, Rose toured the US with Frank Black and Ed Harcourt.

=== 2003–2008: homecoming, Come The Storm and At Our Tables ===
In 2003, Rose returned to live in the US. She taught herself to play the piano and went to Martha's Vineyard to write new songs over the winter. The resultant album, Come the Storm was recorded at the famous Long View Farm studios in Massachusetts with local musicians including guitarist Seth Goodman. It was released in the UK on Banana Records in October 2005. In the US, Judy Collins personally offered to put it out on her own label, Wildflower Records, and it received a 2007 release.

Rose released her fourth album, At Our Tables, in Europe through Evangeline Records on March 10, 2008. Recorded in Detroit, it was co-produced by Al Sutton, who has worked with Sheryl Crow and Kid Rock, and Eric Hoegemeyer (Charm Farm, Kid Rock, Uncle Kracker). It was recorded with members of Rose's touring band, The Holy Wreck – guitarists Bull and Goodman, Nicholas Giadone Ward on bass – and members of local bands Sponge and Detroit Cobras. Nick Lucassian of Detroit band Shipwreck Union sings a vocal duet with Rose on the track "Will-O'-The-Wisp".

The song "$20 Shoes" received over 500,000 views on YouTube when someone paired it up with a Betty Boop cartoon. In the UK, BBC Radio 2's Bob Harris playlisted "Doesn't Mean A Thing", and invited Rose to record a session for his show.

Rose asked guitarist and pedal steel player Rich Gilbert (known for his work with Boston bands Human Sexual Response and The Zulus, and later with Tanya Donelly and Frank Black and the Catholics), to join her band for the At Our Tables tour.

In September 2008, At Our Tables was re-released with an additional live CD of tracks off the album which was recorded at Long View Farm studios with the touring Holy Wreck band – Gilbert, Ward, and James Murray on drums. At the same session, the band recorded "Live At Longview", a limited edition CD featuring re-worked versions of old songs and demo versions of some new songs, which was self-released and sold at shows.

=== 2009–present: Nashville, Luna Turista and The Silver Threads ===
At the end of 2008, Rose relocated to Nashville, TN and started to work with local musicians including Gilbert and drummer Nate Stalfa, known for his work with Knock Down Society and Caitlin Carey. The three played live together a lot, and previewed songs from Rose's forthcoming album on a European tour in May 2009.

Rose recorded her fifth studio album, Luna Turista, with Gilbert and Stalfa and released it under the name of Eileen Rose & The Holy Wreck. The record features Joshua Hedley, who plays fiddle with Justin Townes Earle, on fiddle and vocals, and Aaron Oliva on bass. It was recorded half at the Fry Pharmacy in Nashville, and half in Berlin during the May 2009 tour. Rose and Gilbert produced, and the album was mixed by Rob Clark, who works with Neil Young and produced Crosby, Stills, Nash and Young's Deja Vu. It includes nine original Rose compositions and a cover of the country classic "Luckenbach, Texas," which was a hit for Waylon Jennings in 1977. Luna Turista was released in Europe on Floating World (an offshoot of Evangeline) on October 4, 2009. Rose, Gilbert, Stalfa and Hedley toured Europe in support of the release in October/November, and Rose and Gilbert toured Germany again as a duo in October 2010. A US release for Luna Turista is planned for 2011.

In 2010, Rose was invited to contribute a song for the Joey's Song project. She and Gilbert recorded a version of the old children's song "Oh Johnny Lebeck", which features on the first Joey's Song CD, which was released in January 2011.

When she is not recording or touring her own material, Rose plays on Nashville's Lower Broad, with her classic country / honky tonk covers band, The Silver Threads. Formed by Rose and Gilbert at the end of 2009, other band members include Johnnie Barber, who previously played drums with Johnny Paycheck and Merle Haggard, and upright bass players Joe Fick (Travis Mann Band) and Zachary Shedd (Hank Williams III). They cover songs by the likes of Connie Smith, Lynn Anderson, Brenda Lee, Loretta Lynn, Ray Price, Buck Owens and Jeanne Pruet. The Silver Threads have weekly residences at Robert's Western World and Layla's Bluegrass Inn and they self-released their first album, entitled The Silver Threads, in December 2010.

== Touring ==
Throughout her career, Rose has toured extensively with her live band, Eileen Rose & The Holy Wreck. They have headlined tours in the UK, Germany, Italy and The Netherlands. In 2009 they played their first shows in Croatia and Serbia. Rose has also opened for many artists in the US and Europe, including Ryan Adams, Ron Sexsmith, David Gray, The Pernice Brothers, Handsome Family, Eddi Reader, Ani DiFranco, Judy Collins, Jonathan Richmond, Frank Black, The Ramones, Tim Finn, Joe Ely, Radiohead, Butch Walker, Alabama 3, Tanya Donnelly, The Lemonheads, Joe Bonamassa, Cracker, Wayne Hancock and Lonnie Donegan.

- Rose performed at the 2009 SxSW
- In June 2009 Rose was invited to play at the opening of the Charlotte Street Blues Bar in London
- In July 2009 she performed at the Goud'Acoustic Festival Folk Americana in Goudargues, France
- In May 2010 Rose and Gilbert played at the Sarzana Acoustic Guitar Festival with Jackson Browne
- In November 2010 Rose was asked to play at the Wood House Concert Series in St. Louis, Missouri.

== Discography ==
=== Fledgling ===
- Fledgling (1995) TVT (US)

=== Eileen Rose ===
- Shine Like It Does (2000) Rough Trade Records (UK)
- Party Dress EP (2001) Rough Trade Records (UK)
- Shine Like It Does (2001) Sanctuary Records (US)
- Long Shot Novena (2002) Rough Trade Records (UK) / Compass Records (US)
- Come The Storm (2005) Banana Recordings (Sony Music) (UK) / Wildflower Records (US, 2007)
- At Our Tables (March 2008) Evangeline Records (UK)
- At Our Tables Plus (including a bonus live CD) (September 2008) Evangeline Records (UK)
- Bones W/The Legendary Rich Gilbert (2013) self-released (US)
- 'Be Many Gone (January 2014) Holy Wreckords/Cadiz (US/UK)

=== Eileen Rose and The Holy Wreck ===
- Live at Longview (2008) (self-released)
- Luna Turista (2009) Floating World (UK)

=== The Silver Threads ===
- The Silver Threads (2010) (self-released)
- Live at Robert's (2012) (self-released)

=== Soundtracks, Compilations, Guest Performances ===
Soundtracks

- The Fledgling song "August", co-written by Rose and David Bull, was included on the soundtrack of the Sandra Bullock / Denis Leary movie Two If by Sea (1996)
- "Shining", from Shine Like It Does is on the soundtrack album for the Disney movie The Rookie (2002), along with Ryan Adams and Steve Earle.
- "Lie To Me", from Shine Like It Does, featured in an episode of the TV show Felicity

Compilations

- "Mortar And Stone", a track Rose recorded at the Shine Like It Does sessions but did not include on the album, can be found on Truck Records' Down at the Twisted am Lounge compilation (2001)
- "Rose", from Shine Like It Does, featured on Uncut Magazine's CD in February 2001
- "Good Man", from Long Shot Novena, featured on Uncut Magazine's CD in April 2002
- "Wheels Going By" appeared on Another Country Vol 2 (2004) (Agenda) (UK)
- Rose's previously unreleased version of "Oh Johnny Lebeck" features on the first Joey's Song CD (January 2011)

Guest Performances

- Rose sings on "Femtex" on Therapy's album Troublegum (1994)
- Rose provided backing vocals for Alabama 3's single Wade into The Water, from their 2000 LP, La Peste. She also joined them onstage during their tour.
- Rose sings "North Pole Transmission" on FC Kahuna's album Machine Says Yes (City Rockers City Rock, 2002).
