= The Godfathers (album) =

Studio album by the Godfathers
- Released: 1993
- Recorded: May–July 1993
- Studios: Utopia; Helicon Mountain; Gooseberry (London)
- Genre: Rock
- Length: 44:22
- Label: Intercord
- Producer: Ralph Jezzard

The Godfathers chronology
Unreal World (1991)	The Godfathers (1993)	Afterlife (1995)

Singles from The Godfathers
- 1. "Strange About Today" Released: 1993

Alternative cover
- 2013 deluxe edition

The Godfathers, also known as the Orange Album, is the fifth studio album by English rock band the Godfathers, released on German label Intercord in 1993. It was the band's first out of two albums for the label, and the only studio album to feature drummer Ali Byworth. It has become known as the Orange Album because of the citrus fruit appearing on its cover. The album was reissued in 2013 through the Godfathers' own Godfathers Recordings label, including a bonus disc of demos and live tracks.

== Background ==
In 1992, the Godfathers were let go by Epic Records, for whom they had recorded three studio albums, but signed in 1993 to the German independent label Intercord Records. Until then the Godfathers had been a five-piece with two guitarists. But when the original members began to leave the band after More Songs About Love and Hate (1989) and Unreal World (1991), founding members Peter and Chris Coyne (vocals and bass, respectively) decided to strip the band down to a four-piece for The Godfathers. This included guitarist Chris Burrows, who had played on Unreal World, and new drummer Ali Byworth.

The album was recorded in London between May and July 1993 at Utopia Studios, Gooseberry Sound Studios, and Jools Holland's Helicon Mountain. It was produced by Ralph Jezzard, who had worked with Peter and Chris Coyne's previous band the Sid Presley Experience in 1984 and produced EMF's 1991 hit "Unbelievable", among other things.

The album sold poorly, as it was only made available outside mainland Europe on import. Peter Coyne has described the album as a "lost Godfathers album," saying, "some Godfathers fans know about it, but a lot don't." Burrows and Byworth left the band in 1995, and the Godfathers recorded one more album for Intercord with a new lineup, 1995's Afterlife.

Coinciding with the album's 20th anniversary in 2013, The Godfathers was reissued by the band themselves when the rights to the album reverted to the band from Intercord. It includes the previously unreleased track "I'm Gone" as one of 13 bonus tracks. Peter Coyne has placed it among his favourite Godfathers albums, calling it "an overlooked gem that has many, many great songs on it."

== Critical reception ==
Professional ratings
Review scores
Source	Rating
Record Collector	3/5 stars

In a retrospective review, Record Collector's Terry Staunton wrote, "there's a sense of a band at least partially trying to reinvent themselves by stretching their canvas. "World on Fire" dabbles in the psych-dance shuffle of Madchester, "Free Yourself" rips a page out of the Iggy Pop school of punk, and "That's the Way I Feel" is almost a throwback to 60s garage rock." Staunton felt that the album may not quite be one of their best albums, "but it's still an offer many will find hard to refuse."

Also writing retrospectively, John Clarkson of the Pennyblackmusic website noted a "slight over-abundance" of love songs (or anti-love songs), and stated that the album needed a few more "vitriolic politically charged and socially-conscious" songs. Despite a solid production, Clarkson felt that the album lacked the "crispness" of the band's earlier work. He concluded, however, that "this under-heard, little acknowledged and misunderstood album stands up a lot better now than it has been remembered. It may not be one of the great Godfathers albums, but it is certainly a very good one."

== Track listing ==
No.	Title	Writer(s)	Length
1.	"Free Yourself"	Peter Coyne, Chris Burrows, Ali Byworth	2:39
2.	"Strange About Today"	P. Coyne, Burrows	3:54
3.	"World on Fire"	P. Coyne, Chris Coyne, Burrows	4:51
4.	"Trip on You"	P. Coyne, C. Coyne, Burrows, Byworth	3:00
5.	"That's the Way I Feel"	P. Coyne, C. Coyne, Burrows, Byworth	3:15
6.	"Help Me Now"	P. Coyne, C. Coyne, Burrows	4:37
7.	"Losing My Mind"	P. Coyne, C. Coyne, Burrows	2:42
8.	"She Said"	P. Coyne, Burrows, Byworth	4:21
9.	"The Prisoner"	P. Coyne, Burrows	4:33
10.	"Seven Days"	P. Coyne, Burrows	3:26
11.	"21st Century Dreaming"	P. Coyne, Burrows	4:16
12.	"Time Is Now"	P. Coyne, C. Coyne	2:48
Total length:			44:22

=== 2013 deluxe edition: remastered and reloaded ===
Disc 1 – The Godfathers

- as per original album

Disc 2 – Previously unreleased studio demos and live recordings
No.	Title	Writer(s)	Recording date and location	Length
1.	"I'm Gone" (demo)	P. Coyne, C. Coyne	March–May 1992	2:05
2.	"Losing My Mind" (demo)	P. Coyne, C. Coyne, Burrows	March–May 1992	2:49
3.	"World on Fire" (demo)	P. Coyne, C. Coyne, Burrows	March–May 1992	4:47
4.	"That's the Way I Feel" (demo)	P. Coyne, C. Coyne, Burrows, Byworth	March–May 1992	3:26
5.	"Help Me Now" (demo)	P. Coyne, C. Coyne, Burrows	March–May 1992	4:28
6.	"Free Yourself" (live)	P. Coyne, Burrows, Byworth	September 1992, Ebullition, Bulle, Switzerland	2:40
7.	"Strange About Today" (live)	P. Coyne, Burrows	September 1992, Ebullition, Bulle, Switzerland	3:43
8.	"That's the Way I Feel" (live)	P. Coyne, C. Coyne, Burrows, Byworth	September 1992, recorded somewhere in France	3:18
9.	"Losing My Mind" (live)	P. Coyne, C. Coyne, Burrows	September 1992, Ebullition, Bulle, Switzerland	2:44
10.	"The Prisoner" (live)	P. Coyne, Burrows	September 1992, Ebullition, Bulle, Switzerland	4:22
11.	"World on Fire" (live)	P. Coyne, C. Coyne, Burrows	19 June 1992, The Grand, Clapham, London	4:32
12.	"Help Me Now" (live)	P. Coyne, C. Coyne, Burrows	19 June 1992, The Grand, Clapham, London	4:18
13.	"I'm Gone" (live)	P. Coyne, C. Coyne	19 June 1992, The Grand, Clapham, London	2:10
Total length:				45:24

Notes

- 2013 deluxe edition remastered by Andy Pearce.
- Tracks 11–13 recorded and mixed by Trevor Cronin.

== Personnel ==
Adapted from the album liner notes.

The Godfathers

- Peter Coyne – vocals
- Chris Coyne – bass, backing vocals
- Chris Burrows – guitar, backing vocals
- Ali Byworth – drums, percussion, backing vocals

Technical

- Ralph Jezzard – producer, engineer, mixing
- Phil Bax – assistant engineer
- Jaime Martin – artwork
