= Put You in Your Place =

Single by The Sunshine Underground

from the album Raise the Alarm
- Released: 18 July 2005; 14 August 2006
- Recorded: 2005, 2006 (reissue)
- Genre: Indie, dance-punk
- Length: 3:16
- Label: City Rockers

The Sunshine Underground singles chronology
"I Ain't Losing Any Sleep" (2006)	"Put You in Your Place" (2005)	"Commercial Breakdown" (2006)

Original debut release cover

"Put You in Your Place" is the 7" debut Single by Leeds indie rock band The Sunshine Underground. The single was released 18 July 2005, by City Rockers and has been limited to 1000 copies. The single has been re-released on CDS and 7" Single on 14 August 2006 in forward to the album Raise the Alarm. It is the band's most successful single to date, reaching number 39 in the UK Singles Chart in August 2006.

== Track listing ==
=== Original Release ===
==== 7" single ====
1. "Put You in Your Place"
2. "They Got a Hold Of Us"

=== Re-release ===
==== CD single ====
1. "Put You in Your Place"
2. "Out Of Control"
3. "You Never Party"

==== 7" single #1 ====
1. "Put You in Your Place"
2. "Out Of Control"

==== 7" single #2 (limited) ====
1. "Put You in Your Place"
2. "You Never Party"

== Chart performance ==
Chart (2006)	Peak position
UK Indie (Official Charts)	3
UK Singles (Official Charts)	39
