= Spell It Out =

Spell It Out may refer to:

- "Spell It Out", a 2010 song by The Sunshine Underground from Nobody's Coming to Save You
- "Spell It Out", a 2011 song by Gavin DeGraw from Sweeter
- "Spell It Out", a 2017 song by You Me at Six from Night People
- "Spell It Out", a 2002 Look and Read Series featuring, Eyes, Ears, Brain, and Control which they tackle spelling problems
