= Raise the Alarm =

Raise the Alarm may refer to:

- Raise the Alarm (album)
- Raise the Alarm (song) The Living End
- "Raise the Alarm", song by Air Cuba (band)
