= Machine Says Yes =

Studio album by FC Kahuna
- Released: 8 April 2002
- Genres: Electronica, trip hop, acid house
- Length: 58:14
- Label: City Rockers

FC Kahuna chronology
| Big Kahuna Kicks Two (2000) | Machine Says Yes (2002) | Another Fine Mess (2003) |

Singles from Machine Says Yes
- 1. "Mind Set to Cycle" Released: 2000; 2. "Glitterball" Released: 2002; 3. "Machine Says Yes" Released: 2002; 4. "Hayling" Released: 2003; 5. "Nothing is Wrong" Released: 2003

Machine Says Yes is a studio album by British electronic music duo FC Kahuna, released in April 2002 on the label City Rockers. The album includes five singles: "Mind Set to Cycle", "Glitterball", "Machine Says Yes", "Hayling", and "Nothing is Wrong".

The two most notable singles, "Hayling" and "Machine Says Yes", were co-written and sung by Icelandic singer Hafdís Huld and charted at No. 49 and No. 58 respectively on the UK Singles Chart. In addition, "North Pole Transmission" was sung by American singer Eileen Rose and "Fear of Guitars" was sung by Gruff Rhys.

"Glitterball" was featured in the video games Need for Speed: Underground and Crackdown, while "Hayling" appeared on the soundtrack of the film Layer Cake.

== Reception ==
Professional ratings
Aggregate scores
| Source | Rating |
|---|---|
| Metacritic | 77/100 |
Review scores
| Source | Rating |
| Allmusic | 4/5 stars |
| Pitchfork | 4.7/10 stars |
| NME | 8/10 stars |
| Dallas Observer | Positive |
| PopMatters | Positive |
| Playlouder | 4.5/5 stars |

Critical reception of Machine Says Yes was generally positive, with Metacritic reporting a normalised score of 77% based on 15 reviews which indicates that it is "generally favorable". Peter Robinson of NME wrote that the album is "fresh, feisty and fierce", but also that it "lacks a definitive thumper likely to propel the duo to the chart status you'd reckon". Pitchfork's Mark Martelli was less receptive and wrote that "too much calculation has gone into Machine Says Yes. The record smacks of market research, not the craven, late-night interplay that communicates real soul."

== Track listing ==
| No. | Title | Length |
|---|---|---|
| 1. | "Fear Of Guitars" | 5:10 |
| 2. | "Glitterball" | 5:48 |
| 3. | "Machine Says Yes" | 6:33 |
| 4. | "Growler" | 6:45 |
| 5. | "Nothing Is Wrong" | 5:11 |
| 6. | "Bleep Freak" | 2:23 |
| 7. | "Hayling" | 6:50 |
| 8. | "Mindset To Cycle" | 6:26 |
| 9. | "Microcuts" | 7:35 |
| 10. | "North Pole Transmission" | 4:58 |
| Total length: | | 58:57 |

== Charts ==
| Chart (2002) | Peak position |
|---|---|
| UK Albums (Official Charts) | 88 |
| UK Independent Albums (Official Charts) | 10 |
