= The Sunshine Underground =

English alternative dance band

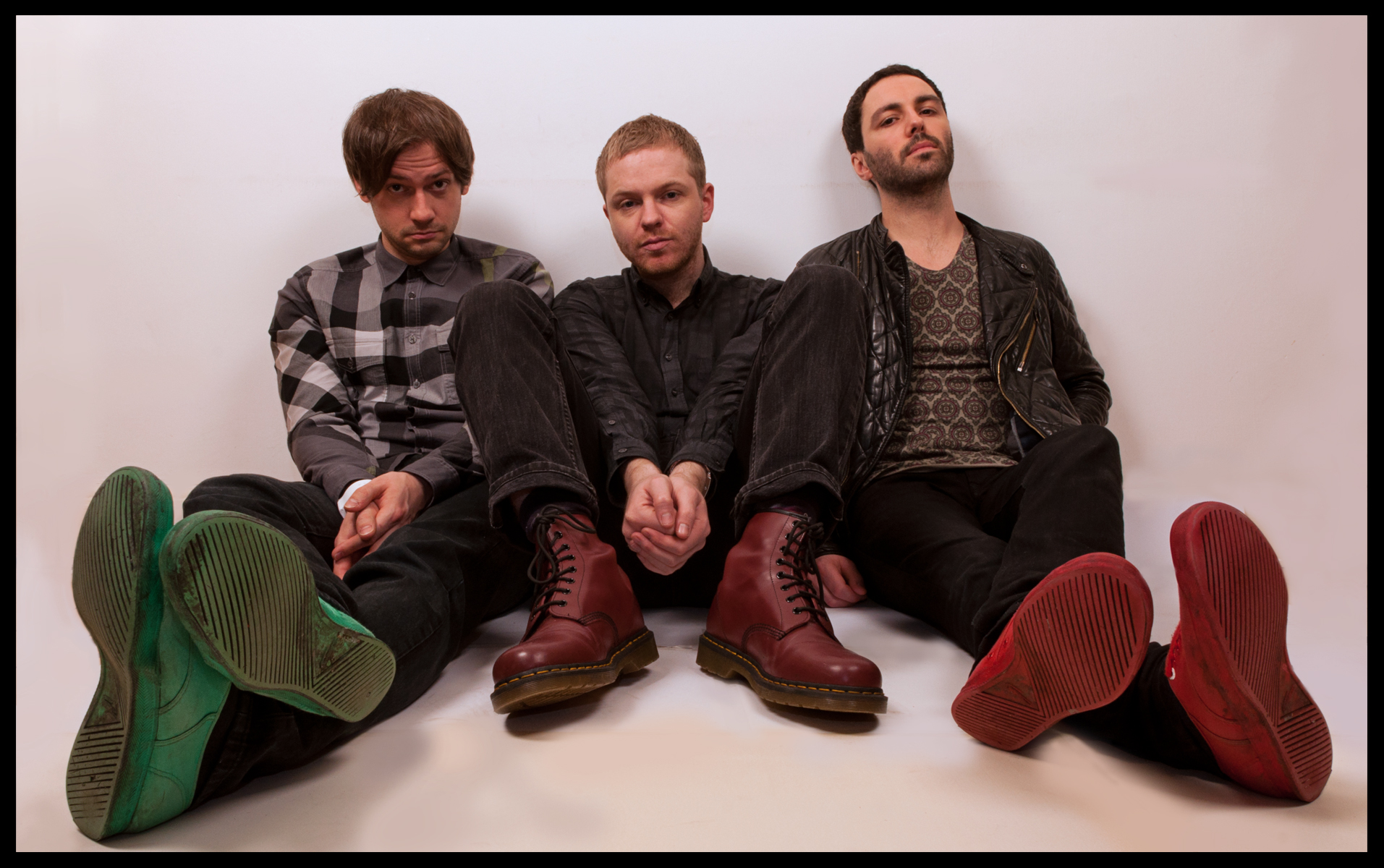
- The Sunshine Underground in 2012

Background information
- Origin: Leeds, England; Telford, England; Shrewsbury, England
- Genres: Indie, dance, electronic
- Years active: 2000–2016; 2025–2026
- Label: Lovers
- Past members: Craig Wellington; Stuart Jones; Matthew Gwilt; Daley Smith
- Website: The Sunshine Underground (as of 2014)

The Sunshine Underground (often shortened to TSU) were an English alternative dance band based in Leeds, England. Their style developed from indie, alternative to electronic music, and they released four full-length albums; Raise the Alarm (2006), Nobody's Coming to Save You (2010), The Sunshine Underground (2014) and their farewell album, Luminescent (2016). The group, named after a song from the 1999 album Surrender by The Chemical Brothers, were often associated with the British nu-rave scene of 2006 and built a respectable live following after years of touring. In July 2026, the band returned to perform comeback gigs in celebration of 20 years since the album Raise the Alarm.

== Biography ==
=== Formation and first album – Raise The Alarm ===
The band are originally from Telford and Shrewsbury, and formed while studying at New College Telford. After New College the band moved to Woodhouse in Leeds where they started to develop their sound and ultimately became one of the original acts dubbed "nu-rave" by music magazine NME alongside Klaxons.

In 2005 the band signed to City-Rockers label (London) and began work on what was to become their debut album Raise the Alarm. Work was completed in May 2006 and was released on 28 August 2006 on City-Rockers/Sony. The main bulk of the album was recorded in two weeks at The Dairy with Producers Steve Dubb and Seggs while the rest was recorded in various studios in London with Rob Harder, Dan Kahuna + J.C.

"Put You in Your Place" was their 7" debut single, which was released on 18 July 2005 and had been limited to 1,000 copies. The single had been re-released on CDS and 7" single and is the band's most successful single to date, reaching number 39 in the UK Singles Chart in August 2006.

Following the release of the album the band embarked on several UK and European tours. Festival appearances in the UK in 2007 included Glastonbury Festival, T in the Park and Reading and Leeds festival (Radio One/NME stage). The success of the album in the UK was mirrored in Japan (also released on Sony) which saw the band complete two Japanese tours and various festival appearances including Summersonic and British Anthems. Also in 2007 the band were chosen by the NME to be part of the NME New Rave tour alongside Klaxons, CSS and New Young Pony Club.

=== Second album – Nobody's Coming To Save You ===
Although the band were still active on the live scene, they dedicated most of their time from 2008 to 2010 writing what was to become their second studio album. Live achievements during this period included the band's first appearance at V Festival and a successful 15 date UK tour debuting brand new material.

The band recorded a song with FC Kahuna named "From The City to the Sea" which was made public and free for download in February 2009. The song takes a sample from the Aphex Twin track "Windowlicker".

On 3 November 2009 The Sunshine Underground released a 5 Track EP called Everything, Right Now. The EP featured the track "Coming to Save You" which was to eventually be included on their second album.

The band released the follow-up to Raise The Alarm on 1 February 2010 named Nobody's Coming to Save You released on City Rockers/EMI. To coincide with the release of the album the band embarked on a three-week tour of the UK, which included their biggest hometown gig to date at Leeds Academy.

Later that year the band went on to play at Reading and Leeds festival and the Radio 1/NME stage at T in the Park from where they went on to support LCD Soundsystem at Ibiza Rocks.

In 2011 the band traveled to Mexico and China to play several dates before arriving in Austria for the Annual Snowbombing festival.

On 21 February 2011, Bass player Daley Smith left the band.

=== Third album – The Sunshine Underground ===
The group announced in early 2012 that they would be touring for two weeks in mid April to road-test material for their as yet titled third album. The tour kicked off at Club Academy Manchester on Saturday 14 April and saw them perform 12 gigs across Britain including sold dates at King Tut's (Glasgow), XOYO (London) and The Sugarmill (Stoke) before rounding off the tour with a homecoming gig at Leeds Metropolitan University. The tour saw the band play a number of new songs, tentatively named "The Same Old Ghosts", "It's Only You (IIOY)", "Neutralise", "Add Up To Nothing" and "Finally We Arrive".

In late April 2013, the band announced their return to recording and performing live with a small gig at The Old Blue Last in Shoreditch, London – to coincide with the release of a limited edition single version of "It Is Only You" which was available as a 12" vinyl and download.

The Sunshine Underground returned on 19 May 2014 with their self-titled third album, produced by Ross Orton. The album was preceded by first single "Don't Stop".

=== Fourth and final album – Luminescent ===
The Sunshine Underground released Luminescent on 30 September 2016, and posted the following on Facebook:

"We’ve had the best time ever in this band but the time has come to announce the end of The Sunshine Underground. Ten years on from our debut album feels like the right time to draw a line under what has been an absolute blast and look to new musical adventures…"

Love forever!

Craig, Stu, Matt"

Reunion and one-off comeback shows

After almost 10 years away, in September 2025 The Sunshine Underground announced that they'd be playing a one-off show at Kirkstall Abbey, Leeds on 25 July 2026. The show has been advertised as a 20 year celebration of their debut album Raise The Alarm.

Following this announcement, the band announced a warm-up show at Gorilla, Manchester on 23 July 2026.

== Discography ==
=== Demos ===
- My Army EP (2004)

=== Albums ===
- Raise the Alarm (28 August 2006) – City Rockers
- Nobody's Coming to Save You (1 February 2010) – City Rockers/EMI
- The Sunshine Underground (19 May 2014)
- Luminescent (30 September 2016)

=== Compilations ===
- Raise The Alarm B-Sides & Remixes (6 June 2011) – EMI

=== Extended plays ===
- Everything, Right Now EP (16 November 2009)
- Put You in Your Place (Remixes) (6 June 2011) – EMI

=== Singles ===
Year	Song	Album
2005	"Put You in Your Place"	Non-album single
2006	"Commercial Breakdown"	Non-album single
2006	"What You Like"	Non-album single
2006	"I Ain't Losing Any Sleep"	Raise the Alarm
2006	"Put You in Your Place" (reissue)	Raise the Alarm
2006	"Commercial Breakdown" (reissue)	Raise the Alarm
2007	"Borders"	Raise the Alarm
2010	"In Your Arms"	Nobody's Coming to Save You
2010	"Coming to Save You"	Nobody's Coming to Save You
2010	"We've Always Been Your Friends"	Nobody's Coming to Save You
2010	"Spell It Out"	Nobody's Coming to Save You
2013	"It Is Only You (IIOY)"	12" vinyl (limited to 500 copies)
2014	"Don't Stop"	The Sunshine Underground
2014	"Finally We Arrive"	The Sunshine Underground
2014	"Start"	The Sunshine Underground
2016	"Something's Gonna Happen"	Luminescent
2016	"Today"	Luminescent
