= Sun Arise =

Single by Rolf Harris
- B-side: "The Big Black Hat"
- Released: 1960
- Genre: Folk; pop; world
- Length: 3:03
- Label: Epic; EMI Columbia
- Songwriters: Rolf Harris; Harry Butler
- Producer: George Martin

"Sun Arise" is the fourth single released by Australian singer-songwriter Rolf Harris. Released in January 1961 in Australia and October 1962 in the UK, it was Harris' third charting hit in Australia (following "The Big Black Hat", 1960) and second in the UK (following "Tie Me Kangaroo Down, Sport", also 1960). Unlike his early chart hits, "Sun Arise" was not a comedy record, but came within the genre of world music with its didgeridoo-inspired sound. It was produced by George Martin.

== Production and lyrics ==
The song was written with fellow Western Australian Harry Butler, a naturalist later known for his television show In the Wild.

After the success of "Tie Me Kangaroo Down, Sport", Harris assumed that his future records would be automatically released in the United Kingdom by his label EMI Records. EMI, however, was not so certain, and directed him to George Martin, then known for producing some of the more off-the-wall records of the time. Martin initially called the recording "very boring", which Harris countered by saying that the Aboriginal Australians, whom he was trying to imitate, would "repeat a phrase over and over again and it would become mesmerising". The song was re-written with slightly more lyrics and recorded using eight double basses to mimic the didgeridoo, which Harris could not play at the time. A notable feature of this song is the playing of claves. It has been described as an "early example of 'world' music conjures up a fictional outback full of sunburst optimism."

The song's lyrical structure is simple with the vast majority of the lines starting simply "Sun arise". The lyrics of the song came from a story Butler told him about Aboriginal beliefs. Some tribes see the sun as a goddess. Each time she wakes in the morning, her skirts of light gradually cover more and more of the land, bringing back warmth and light to the air. The only explicit reference to anything Australian in the song is the mention of the kangaroo paw flower, which is endemic to Western Australia.

== Chart performance ==
The track was Harris's second top ten hit in the UK Singles Chart, peaking at No. 3. It was also his first hit in the United States, at No. 61 on the Billboard Hot 100. It also reached No. 61 in his native Australia and No. 98 on re-release in 1963. Thirty-five years after originally charting in the UK, the song (albeit in a re-recorded version) re-entered the chart in October 1997, reaching No. 26.

"Sun Arise" was included on the album of the same name in 1963.

== Cover versions ==
The song was covered in 1971 by Alice Cooper on their third album, Love It to Death.

Alien Sex Fiend referenced the song lyrics on their 1983 single "Ignore The Machine" (No. 6 UK Indie Charts).

In 1986 The Godfathers covered the song as one of their first singles, which was later compiled onto Hit by Hit.

Robert Plant and Jimmy Page of Led Zeppelin performed the song live on the Denton television show in 1994, as part of Page and Plant's No Quarter tour.
