= Nobody's Coming to Save You =

Studio album by The Sunshine Underground
- Released: 1 February 2010
- Recorded: September 2009
- Genre: Indie
- Length: 43:43
- Label: City Rockers / EMI
- Producer: Barny

The Sunshine Underground chronology
Raise the Alarm (2006)	Nobody's Coming to Save You (2010)	The Sunshine Underground (2014)

Professional ratings
Review scores
Source	Rating
Drowned in Sound	6/10 link
Gigwise	link
The Music Fix	7/10 link
Strangeglue	5/10 link
This is Fake DIY	7/10 link

Nobody's Coming to Save You is the second studio album by British indie band The Sunshine Underground, the follow-up to their 2006 album, Raise the Alarm, and was released on 16 February 2010 through City Rockers/EMI. The album was recorded in September 2009 in Castleford.

== Track listing ==
1. "Coming to Save You" – 4:28
2. "Spell It Out" – 3:52
3. "We've Always Been Your Friends" – 4:13
4. "In Your Arms" – 3:50
5. "A Warning Sign" – 5:00
6. "Change Your Mind" – 4:40
7. "Any Minute Now" – 3:36
8. "Here It Comes" – 4:42
9. "One by One" – 3:55
10. "The Messiah" – 5:27
