= Jukebox Fury =

Studio album by the Godfathers
- Released: 4 March 2013
- Recorded: 2010–2012
- Studios: Credible Hulk Productions; Barnroom Studios
- Genres: Rock; alternative rock
- Length: 37:03
- Label: Godfathers Recordings
- Producers: The Godfathers; Bernie Tormé

The Godfathers chronology
Shot Live at the 100 Club (2010)	Jukebox Fury (2013)	A Big Bad Beautiful Noise (2017)

Singles from Jukebox Fury
- 1. "Back into the Future" Released: February 2011; 2. "The Outsider" Released: June 2011; 3. "I Can't Sleep Tonight" Released: February 2013

Jukebox Fury is the seventh studio album by English rock band the Godfathers, released through their own Godfathers Recordings label on 4 March 2013. It is the band's first studio album since they reunited in 2008 and comes eighteen years after their previous studio album, 1995's Afterlife. It is also the first and only Godfathers studio album to feature guitarist Del Bartle.

== Background ==
The Godfathers' original members reformed for a reunion tour in 2008, but by 2009 the lineup had changed to feature original members Peter and Chris Coyne (vocals and bass, respectively), former Sid Presley Experience guitarist Del Bartle, and drummer Grant Nicholas, who played with the Godfathers in the late 1990s. The new lineup recorded the 2010 live album Shot Live at the 100 Club, before entering the studio to work on what would become Jukebox Fury. On the first two singles, "Back into the Future" and "The Outsider", both released in 2011, the Godfathers worked with producer Bernie Tormé at his Barnroom Studios in Kent. The rest of the album was recorded at Del Bartle's Credible Hulk studio. In February 2012, the band posted a rough mix of "Primitive Man" on YouTube, making it the third track previewed from Jukebox Fury before its release. Grant Nicholas left the band in October 2012 and was replaced by Dave Twigg. The album was released in March 2013 and includes a cover of Link Wray's 1965 instrumental "I'm Branded".

It is the first Godfathers album not to feature Peter Coyne on lead vocals on all tracks; "Let Your Hair Hang Down" and "Thai Nights" features Chris Coyne on vocals, and "A Can of Worms" features Del Bartle. The two also handle vocals on "Mary Baby" and "The Man in the Middle". Peter Coyne, who came up with the album title, a pun on the 1960s TV show Juke Box Jury, said: "It is meant to imply that something explosive is happening, something ferocious pertaining to music." After the album's release, Peter Coyne said of the album, "It's sort of our jukebox from hell, with lots of different styles – rock 'n' roll, punk, swamp rock, Spaghetti Western film music, '60s instrumental music, strange 'pop' sounds." He was later dismissive of the album, saying, "there are a few good songs ... but not enough to make for a consistent, classic album."

== Critical reception ==
Professional ratings
Review scores
Source	Rating
Classic Rock	3.5/5 stars
Indiestyle	3.5/5 stars
Metal.de	7/10
Music-News.com	5/5 stars
Musikexpress	2/6 stars
Ox-Fanzine	3.5/5 stars
Peek-a-Boo	9/10
Record Collector	3/5 stars

Reviews were generally positive. Music-News.com's Paolo Gandolfi called the album "a Godfathers masterpiece matched by its lyrical wizardry," while, in a negative review, Marcel Anders of Musikexpress wrote that the cover "I'm Branded" was the only highlight on a weak album. Some reviewers noted a more expansive side to the Godfathers, notably on tracks like "Let Your Hair Hang Down" (psychedelia), "Mary Baby" (psychedelic pop), "Theme to the End of the World" (Spaghetti Western music), and on the "Lennon-esque" piano-led ballad "Thai Nights". Chris Konings, writing for Peek-a-Boo magazine, wrote, "they manage to go from Cash, Elvis, the Beatles, Iggy, Ramones or even Morricone and boil it all in a punk stew to make it even tastier then a burger in Arnold's from Happy Days." Louder Than War commented, "They still sound more like a vicious 60's garage band than musicians influenced by anything from the last thirty years." John Clarkson of Pennyblackmusic credited much of the album's success with "the sparkling guitar work" of Del Bartle, and said, "Jukebox Fury finds the Godfathers ... both having lost none of their edge or anger and also roaring to new heights." Record Collector's Terry Staunton wrote that "the driving R&B and punk attitude of old is pleasingly present and correct," but added, "admittedly, there isn't anything quite up to the power of past glories such as Birth, School, Work, Death, but it's clear that age hasn't cooled the fire in their bellies."

== Track listing ==
No.	Title	Writer(s)	Length
1.	"Let Your Hair Hang Down"	Del Bartle, Chris Coyne	3:08
2.	"If I Only Could"	Bartle, C. Coyne, Peter Coyne, Grant Nicholas	2:19
3.	"Primitive Man"	Bartle, C. Coyne, P. Coyne, Nicholas	4:09
4.	"The Outsider"	Bartle, P. Coyne	2:32
5.	"I'm Branded"	Link Wray	2:22
6.	"A Can of Worms"	Bartle	3:58
7.	"Back into the Future"	Bartle, C. Coyne, P. Coyne	4:26
8.	"I Can't Sleep Tonight"	Bartle, C. Coyne, P. Coyne, Nicholas	2:16
9.	"Mary Baby"	Bartle, C. Coyne	3:07
10.	"Theme to the End of the World"	Bartle, C. Coyne, P. Coyne	2:48
11.	"The Man in the Middle"	Bartle, C. Coyne	3:26
12.	"Thai Nights"	C. Coyne	2:19

== Personnel ==
Adapted from the album liner notes, except where noted.

The Godfathers

- Peter Coyne – vocals
- Chris Coyne – bass, vocals, guitar, keyboards, percussion
- Del Bartle – guitar, vocals, bass, keyboards, percussion
- Grant Nicholas – drums, vocals, percussion
- Dave Twigg – drums

Additional musicians

- Richard Allum – backing vocals (track 6)

Technical

- The Godfathers – producer
- Bernie Tormé – co-producer (tracks 4, 7)
- Del Bartle – engineer, mixing
- Andy Pearce – mastering
- Jaime Martin – sleeve design, artwork
