= Alpha Beta Gamma Delta =

Studio album by the Godfathers
- Released: 16 September 2022
- Recorded: 2020–2021
- Studios: Abatis Studios (Honiley, Warwickshire)
- Genre: Rock
- Length: 47:41
- Label: Godfathers Recordings
- Producer: Jon Priestley

The Godfathers chronology
This Is War! The Godfathers Live! (2019)	Alpha Beta Gamma Delta (2022)

Singles from Alpha Beta Gamma Delta
- 1. "I'm Not Your Slave" / "Wild and Free" Released: 17 June 2020; 2. "Midnight Rider" Released: 26 August 2022; 3. "I Hate the 21st Century" Released: 9 June 2023

Alternative cover
- Alpha Beta Gamma Delta Plus

Alpha Beta Gamma Delta is the ninth studio album by English rock band the Godfathers, released on 16 September 2022 on their own Godfathers Recordings label. It marks the first Godfathers album to feature the lineup of singer and founding member Peter Coyne with new members Jon Priestley (bass), Richie Simpson (guitar), Wayne Vermaak (guitar), and Billy Duncanson (drums).

== Background ==
When Peter Coyne fired the entire previous Godfathers lineup in 2019, he quickly assembled a new band consisting of bassist Jon Priestley, guitarists Richie Simpson and Wayne Vermaak, and drummer Billy Duncanson. They soon began touring and writing new songs, resulting in the double A-side single "I'm Not Your Slave"/"Wild and Free" on 17 June 2020. Due to the COVID-19 lockdowns, the album was recorded in separate stages with three or four songs at a time at Jon Priestley's Abatis Studios in Honiley, Warwickshire, until the album began to take shape and was completed. This delayed the album's release by 18 months, according to Peter Coyne. Alpha Beta Gamma Delta was released on 16 September 2022 through the band's own label, Godfathers Recordings.

The four-track Midnight Rider EP was released ahead of the album on 26 August 2022, and included its title track and "OCD" – both taken from Alpha Beta Gamma Delta – and the two non-album tracks "When the Cowards Fall" and "Fade Away".

The I Hate the 21st Century EP was released on 9 June 2023, featuring the title track, "You Gotta Wait", and alternative acoustic versions of "Straight Down the Line" and "Tonight".

An expanded 2-CD version of the album entitled Alpha Beta Gamma Delta Plus was released in October 2023, containing the original album plus rare single and EP tracks, alternative acoustic album tracks, and live recordings.

== Critical reception ==
Professional ratings
Review scores
Source	Rating
Classic Rock	4/5 stars
The I-94 Bar	5/5 stars
Maximum Volume Music	9/10
The Punk Site.com	4/5 stars
Rocknytt	4/5 stars

The album was well received by critics. Ged Babey of Louder Than War wrote that "for a band of this vintage who adhere to traditional ideas of how rock'n'roll should sound, it is a cracking album. It's melodic, mature, varied, the band still crank out songs of controlled rage, but can pull off gentler numbers too when they need to." John Clarkson of Pennyblackmusic called it "one of the highlights of the Godfathers' lengthy career," and Julian Marszalek of Classic Rock stated it was their best album since 1991's Unreal World, writing, "through a combination of hard riffing, melodicism and Priestley's cranked-up production, the Godfathers deliver with a sincerity that's utterly palpable throughout." Über Röck's Jim Rowland described it as "slick, punchy and crammed with very well written, catchy tunes," and added, "Whilst much of it is upbeat with quite a commercial sheen in places, you can still rest assured that lyrically much of it still sits in an altogether darker place."

== Track listing ==
No.	Title	Writer(s)	Length
1.	"Alpha Beta Gamma Delta"	Peter Coyne, Jon Priestley	0:29
2.	"Bring On the Sunshine"	Coyne, Priestley	3:37
3.	"You Gotta Wait"	Coyne, Wayne Vermaak	3:24
4.	"I Hate the 21st Century"	Coyne, Priestley	3:37
5.	"OCD"	Coyne, Richie Simpson	3:57
6.	"Midnight Rider"	Coyne, Priestley	4:20
7.	"Straight Down the Line"	Coyne, Vermaak	3:51
8.	"Lay That Money Down"	Coyne, Vermaak	3:07
9.	"Tonight"	Coyne, Priestley	3:34
10.	"I'm Not Your Slave"	Coyne, Priestley	4:03
11.	"There's No Time"	Coyne, Priestley	3:19
12.	"Dead in Los Angeles"	Coyne, Simpson	6:00
13.	"I Despair"	Coyne, Priestley, Vermaak	4:23

=== Alpha Beta Gamma Delta Plus ===
Disc one
as per original CD

Disc two
No.	Title	Writer(s)	Length
1.	"Wild and Free" (double A-side single with "I'm Not Your Slave", 2020)	Coyne, Simpson	4:37
2.	"When the Cowards Fall" (Midnight Rider EP, 2022)	Coyne, Priestley	4:15
3.	"Fade Away" (Midnight Rider EP)	Coyne, Vermaak	3:57
4.	"Bring On the Sunshine" (acoustic)	Coyne, Priestley
5.	"I'm Not Your Slave" (acoustic)	Coyne, Priestley
6.	"Lay That Money Down" (acoustic)	Coyne, Vermaak
7.	"Straight Down the Line" (acoustic)	Coyne, Vermaak
8.	"Tonight" (acoustic)	Coyne, Priestley
9.	"You Gotta Wait" (acoustic)	Coyne, Vermaak
10.	"Wild and Free" (live)	Coyne, Simpson
11.	"Into the Blue" (live)	Simpson, Billy Duncanson, Garry Borland, Jerry Crowe
12.	"Dead in Los Angeles" (live)	Coyne, Simpson
13.	"I Wanna Be Your Dog" (live)	Dave Alexander, Ron Asheton, Scott Asheton, Iggy Pop

Note

- Tracks 10–13 recorded live on 11 March 2020 at Rockpalast Crossroads at Harmonie Club in Bonn, Germany, by WDR.

== Personnel ==
Adapted from the album liner notes.

The Godfathers

- Peter Coyne – vocals
- Jon Priestley – bass, electric guitar, acoustic guitar, keyboards, backing vocals
- Wayne Vermaak – electric guitar, acoustic guitar, backing vocals
- Richie Simpson – electric guitar, backing vocals
- Billy Duncanson – drums, backing vocals

Additional musicians

- Mike Exeter – keyboards

Technical personnel

- Jon Priestley – producer, engineer, mixing
- James Livett – mastering
- Jaime Martin – artwork
- Simon Balaam – band photography
