= The Ghost Frequency =

British rock band

Background information
- Origin: London, England
- Genres: Indie Rock, dance-punk, Post-hardcore, electronic hardcore, electronica
- Years active: 2005–2009
- Label: City Rockers.
- Past members: Doran Edwards; Barney Ward; Anthony Murphy; Ross Colgan; Jason Adelinia; Ben Chetwood

The Ghost Frequency were a British rock band signed to the City Rockers label.

== History ==
The Ghost Frequency formed in Spring 2005 and began writing songs and recording demos on a four-track recorder. Drummer Ben Chetwood joined the band in November of that year and the band began rehearsing for live shows in 2006. After a year of writing and gigging, the band were signed up by City Rockers and began work on their debut single "Nightmare", which was released as a limited edition 7-inch red vinyl in August 2007.

The band toured the UK throughout the autumn, including joining Hadouken! on their UK tour as main support, and a support slot at a T on the Fringe concert in Edinburgh with The Duke Special.

On 10 December 2007 The Ghost Frequency released their second single "Never Before Have I Seen a Man Alive That Looks So Exactly Like a Skeleton", again on limited edition 7-inch vinyl. The band recorded a suitably macabre promotional video for the song, which received play on MTV2, NME TV, and E4 music among others, and was again popular on YouTube. The single was also popular on BBC Radio 1 receiving the support of DJ Zane Lowe, and XFM's John Kennedy among others. It received a two star review from the Daily Mirror, who described it as "the sound of bats in Franz Ferdinand's belfry, or a punch-up between Gotheared troops and the spiky punk massive". The NME described it as "An exercise in mounting paranoia and unrest, it’s all squelching synths and squiggly guitar lines, which, by the 15th play, is still ringing around your head."

The band played at the Evolution Festival on Tyneside in 2008. After disbanding, drummer Jason Adelinia would join Cardiff-based indie band Los Campesinos!.

== Musical style ==
The Guardian stated that the band "have broken down what makes the nu-rave generation hit the download button, and come up with a combination of the Rapture's electropop and the posthardcore of At the Drive-In".

== Members ==
- Doran Edwards - lead vocals, programming
- Barney Ward - synthesizers
- Anthony Murphy - guitars
- Ross Colgan - guitars, bass, synthesizers
- Jason Adelinia - drums

== Discography ==
=== Albums ===
- Electric Teeth (2010), Pedigree Cuts

=== Extended Plays ===
- The Ghost Frequency (2007), City Rockers/Buddhist Punk - promotional only

=== Singles ===
- "Nightmare" (2007), City Rockers
- "Never Before Have I Seen a Man Alive That Looks So Exactly Like a Skeleton" (2007), City Rockers
