= Raise the Alarm (album) =

Studio album by The Sunshine Underground
- Released: 28 August 2006
- Recorded: May 2006
- Genre: Indie
- Length: 43:16
- Label: City Rockers
- Producers: Dub, Segs, Robert Harder

The Sunshine Underground chronology
Raise the Alarm (2006)	Nobody's Coming to Save You (2010)

Professional ratings
Review scores
Source	Rating
411mania	(8.0/10) link
Allmusic	link
Gigwise	link
The Guardian	link
Clickmusic	link
Neu! Magazine	(7/10) link
This Is Fake DIY	link

Raise the Alarm is the debut album by British indie band The Sunshine Underground, released 28 August 2006. NME described the album as the "first great album of the new rave movement" which included the Klaxons and Shitdisco.

== Track listing ==
All songs written by Craig Wellington, Stuart Jones & Matthew Gwilt

1. "Wake Up" – 2:31
2. "Put You in Your Place" – 3:14
3. "Dead Scene" – 3:55
4. "The Way It Is" – 5:14
5. "Commercial Breakdown" – 3:50
6. "Somebody's Always Getting in the Way" – 3:00
7. "Borders" – 4:02
8. "Panic Attack" – 3:44
9. "I Ain't Losing Any Sleep" – 4:19
10. "My Army" – 4:09
11. "Raise the Alarm" – 5:15
12. "Climbing the Walls" (hidden track on the CD edition) – 3:37
