= Luminescent (album) =

Studio album by The Sunshine Underground
- Released: 30 September 2016
- Recorded: 2016
- Genre: Dance, electronic
- Length: 41:48
- Label: Lovers

The Sunshine Underground chronology
The Sunshine Underground (2014)	Luminescent (2016)

Luminescent is the fourth and final studio album by British indie and electronic band The Sunshine Underground released 30 September 2016.

== Track listing ==
1. Rise – 5:39
2. Something's Gonna Happen – 3:38
3. Sunbeam – 5:08
4. Today – 4:03
5. Luminescent – 4:28
6. Open Up – 3:46
7. Shimmer – 4:21
8. Skyline – 4:18
9. Radiator – 6:27

== Chart performance ==
Chart (2016)	Peak position
Scottish Albums (OCC)	79
UK Independent Albums (OCC)	34
