= Dirty Paper Cup =

Studio album by Hafdís Huld
- Released: October 2006
- Genre: Pop
- Length: 41:39
- Label: Red Grape
- Producers: Neill MacColl and Boo Hewerdine

Hafdís Huld chronology
Dirty Paper Cup (2006)	Synchronised Swimmers (2009)

Dirty Paper Cup, Hafdís Huld's debut album, was released in 2006 and won the award of best pop album at the Icelandic music awards. She was also nominated for best video with "Tomoko". The album was produced by Neill MacColl and Boo Hewerdine, who co-wrote 5 of the songs. The album features a cover of The Velvet Underground's "Who Loves the Sun" performed on the ukulele. This was one of four singles released from the album. The b-sides of all the singles were tracks from the album.

== Track listing ==
1. "Ski Jumper" – 3:23
2. "Diamonds On My Belly" – 2:51
3. "My Heart Beats" – 2:00
4. "Tomoko" – 3:19
5. "Plastic Halo" – 3:52
6. "Fucked Up Mind" – 3:01
7. "Happily Ever After" – 3:24
8. "Ice Cream is Nice" – 3:17
9. "Celebration" – 3:42
10. "Hometown Hero" – 4:06
11. "Younger Longer – 3:53
12. "Who Loves the Sun" - 2:33
13. "Sumri Hallar" - 2:18
