= The Sunshine Underground (album) =

Studio album by The Sunshine Underground
- Released: 19 May 2014
- Recorded: 2014
- Genre: Indie, dance, electronic
- Length: 52:24

The Sunshine Underground chronology
Nobody's Coming to Save You (2010)	The Sunshine Underground (2014)	Luminescent (2016)

The Sunshine Underground is the third studio album by British indie band The Sunshine Underground, whose self-titled album marked a shift in genre from indie-rock in their previous two albums to a more electronic sound reminiscent of 80s synthpop.

== Track listing ==
1. Start – 5:53
2. Finally We Arrive – 4:08
3. Nothing To Fear – 3:53
4. Don't Stop – 5:06
5. Battles – 7:07
6. Nightlife – 4:21
7. The Same Old Ghosts – 6:25
8. It Is Only You – 6:07
9. Turn It On – 3:29
10. Here Comes The Storm – 4:55
