= Synchronised Swimmers =

Studio album by Hafdís Huld
- Released: October 12, 2009
- Genre: Pop
- Length: 43:41

Hafdís Huld chronology
| Dirty Paper Cup (2006) | Synchronised Swimmers (2009) |

Synchronised Swimmers is the second album by Icelandic artist Hafdís Huld. The album was released in 2009, roughly coinciding with Hafdís performing at the Iceland Airwaves music festival in Reykjavík. Kónguló was the first single from the album and was released during the summer the same year. So far the album is only available in Iceland, but it will be available in Europe and the rest of the world in early 2010.

== Critical reception ==
Synchronised Swimmers has received mixed reviews from music critics. Samantha Hatfield of BuzzleGoose wrote that "Hafdis Huld has produced a really strong album that is upbeat and will appeal to fans of 90s era chick rock music. Her folksy and eccentric way of constructing Synchronised Swimmers has certainly paid off." Michael Cragg of The Guardian meanwhile gave the album a rating of 2/5, nothing that "as the album progresses, however, Huld's need to appear kooky becomes cloying."

== Track listing ==
1. "Action Man" – 3:50
2. "Oldest Friend" – 3:30
3. "Kónguló" – 2:52
4. "One of Those Things" – 3:26
5. "Boys and Perfume" – 3:24
6. "Synchronised Swimmers" – 3:19
7. "Daisy" – 3:31
8. "Time of My Life" – 3:59
9. "Homemade Lemonade" – 3:19
10. "I Almost Know a Criminal" – 3:15
11. "Robot Robot" – 2:12
12. "Vampires" – 3:01
13. "Winter Sun" – 4:03

== See also ==
- Music of Iceland
