= Hit by Hit =

Studio album by the Godfathers
- Released: November 1986
- Recorded: 1985–1986
- Studios: Jackson Studios, Rickmansworth
- Genres: Garage rock; alternative rock
- Length: 41:33
- Label: Corporate Image
- Producer: Vic Maile

The Godfathers chronology
Hit by Hit (1986)	Birth, School, Work, Death (1988)

Professional ratings
Review scores
Source	Rating
AllMusic	3/5 stars
Record Collector	4/5 stars
Trouser Press	favourable

Hit by Hit is the debut album by alternative rock band the Godfathers, released in November 1986. It was compiled from the Godfathers' three independent singles on their own Corporate Image label released between 1985 and 1986 ("I Want Everything", "This Damn Nation" and "Lonely Man"), plus one previously unreleased song, "Cold Turkey" (a John Lennon cover).

== Critical reception ==
Trouser Press called it "an essential debut", writing, "Hit by Hit presents a band already sporting a remarkably clear vision. Titles like "I Want Everything," "This Damn Nation," "I Want You" and "I’m Unsatisfied," replete with explosive riffing and angry vocals, tell you nearly all you need to know about how the Godfathers saw their lot in Maggie Thatcher's England." In a retrospective review, Record Collector magazine wrote, "The sound of the first rebellion of the 80s London youth against Popworld PLC sounds remarkably fresh and relevant even today."

== Track listing ==
Adapted from the deluxe edition liner notes.

All tracks are written by the Godfathers (Peter Coyne, Chris Coyne, Mike Gibson, Kris Dollimore, George Mazur), except as noted.

No.	Title	Writer(s)	Length
1.	"I Want Everything"		2:54
2.	"This Damn Nation"		2:47
3.	"I Want You"	P. Coyne, C. Coyne	3:11
4.	"Can't Leave Her Alone"	P. Coyne, Del Bartle, C. Coyne	2:19
5.	"Sun Arise"	Rolf Harris, Harry Butler	4:19
6.	"Cold Turkey"	John Lennon	4:45
7.	"John Barry"		2:29
8.	"Sticks and Stones"	P. Coyne, Gibson	4:06
9.	"I'm Unsatisfied"		3:23
10.	"Lonely Man"	P. Coyne, C. Coyne	4:08

2008 deluxe edition bonus tracks
No.	Title	Writer(s)	Length
11.	"Angela"		3:05
12.	"Gone to Texas"	P. Coyne, Bartle, C. Coyne	3:50
13.	"Love Is Dead"		2:43

Notes

- Tracks 3, 8 and 10 from Capo Di Tutti Capi EP. Recorded September 1985, released November 1985.
- Tracks 2, 4 and 7 from "This Damn Nation" single. Recorded January 1986, released March 1986.
- Tracks 1, 5 and 9 from "Sun Arise" / "I Want Everything" single. Recorded 16 June 1986, released September 1986.
- Track 6 previously unreleased.
- Tracks 11–13 from "Love Is Dead" single. Recorded at Elephant Studios, Wapping, released February 1987.

2008 deluxe edition disc 2: Extras (sessions and live)
No.	Title	Writer(s)	Length
1.	"This Damn Nation" (BBC Radio 1 session, Andy Kershaw, 31 October 1985)		2:54
2.	"John Barry" (BBC Radio 1 session, Andy Kershaw, 31 October 1985)		2:31
3.	"Lonely Man" (BBC Radio 1 session, Andy Kershaw, 31 October 1985)	P. Coyne, C. Coyne	4:09
4.	"Sun Arise" (BBC Radio 1 session, Andy Kershaw, 31 October 1985)	Harris, Butler	5:08
5.	"If I Only Had Time" (BBC Radio 1 session, Janice Long, 4 May 1986)		2:40
6.	"I Want Everything" (BBC Radio 1 session, Janice Long, 4 May 1986)		2:48
7.	"I Want You" (BBC Radio 1 session, Janice Long, 4 May 1986)	P. Coyne, C. Coyne	3:13
8.	"I'm Unsatisfied" (BBC Radio 1 session, Janice Long, 4 May 1986)		3:23
9.	"I Want Everything" (live)		2:45
10.	"Love Is Dead" (live)		2:40
11.	"Can't Leave Her Alone" (live)	P. Coyne, Bartle, C. Coyne	2:18
12.	"Cold Turkey" (live)	Lennon	4:21
13.	"Blitzkrieg Bop" (live)	Ramones	2:16
14.	"Lonely Man" (live)		4:07
15.	"Public Enemy Number One" (live)	P. Coyne, Bartle, C. Coyne, Kevin Murphy	2:27
16.	"Anarchy in the U.K." (live)	Paul Cook, Steve Jones, John Lydon, Glen Matlock	3:47

Note

- Tracks 9–16 (disc 2) recorded live around the world and mastered from cassettes at Hiltongrove Studios, London, September 2007 by David Blackman.

== Personnel ==
The Godfathers

- Peter Coyne – vocals
- Chris Coyne – bass, vocals
- Kris Dollimore – guitar, vocals
- Mike Gibson – guitar, vocals
- George Mazur – drums, percussion, vocals

Additional musicians

- Ron Carthy – trumpet on "Gone to Texas"

Technical

- Vic Maile – producer
- Jean Luke Epstein – sleeve, design
- Steve Double – photography
