= Hafdís Huld =

Icelandic singer and actress (born 1979)

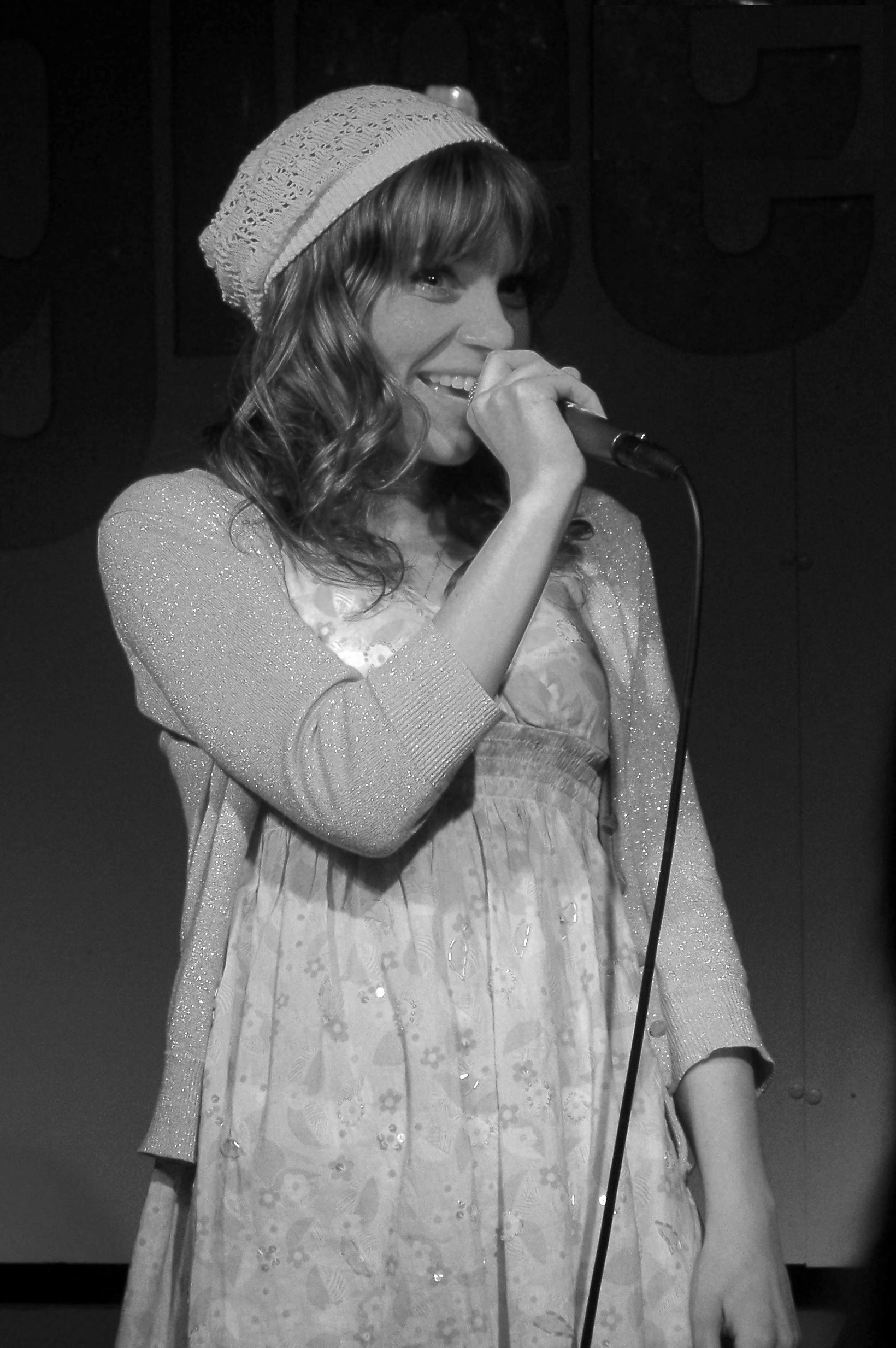
- Hafdís at the Glee Club, Birmingham, in 2007

Background information
- Born: Hafdís Huld Þrastardóttir; 22 May 1979 (age 46); Reykjavík, Iceland
- Genres: Pop
- Occupations: Singer; actress
- Years active: 1995–present
- Labels: Stúdíó Suðurá
- Formerly of: GusGus, FC Kahuna
- Website: hafdishuld.com

Hafdís Huld Þrastardóttir (Icelandic: [ˈhavti:s ˈhʏlt ˈθrastartouhtɪr]; born 22 May 1979), known simply as Hafdís Huld, is an Icelandic singer and actress. She began her musical career as a member of the electronic band GusGus in 1995 and left the group in 1999. Hafdís made her solo debut with her 2006 album Dirty Paper Cup.

== Career ==
=== 1995–1999: Debut with GusGus ===
Hafdís joined the Icelandic electronic band GusGus at its inception in 1995 at the age of 15. During this time, she participated in two world tours.

=== 2000–2005: Collaborations and other activities ===
After leaving the band she started writing her own songs, and collaborated with FC Kahuna, co-writing their singles "Hayling" and "Machine Says Yes", which were included in the 2002 album Machine Says Yes. Elsewhere she sang with dance producers Ewan Pearson and Tom Middleton. During the same period, she made two feature films and modelled clothing for Extreme Sports. She later studied at the London Centre of Contemporary Music, graduating with a Distinction in 2006. Hafdís was featured on the track "The News (A Wholly Owned Subsidiary of Microsoft Inc.)" on the conceptual rap album Deltron 3030 in 2000.

=== 2006–present: Solo debut ===
Her official debut album Dirty Paper Cup was released in 2006 on MVine/Red Grape Records and won the award of best pop album at the Icelandic music awards. She was also nominated for best video with "Tomoko". The result of productive collaborations with a number of highly respected co-writers including Jim Abbiss, Boo Hewerdine, Pascal Gabriel and Chris Corner. The album was universally acclaimed by the press in the UK and Europe and received national radio play on BBC Radio 1, Radio 2 and 6 Music and also won the Icelandic Music Award in early 2007 for Best Pop Album. The album features a cover of The Velvet Underground's "Who Loves the Sun" with a ukulele accompaniment. This was one of four singles released from the album. The b-sides of all the singles were tracks from the album.

Shortly after releasing the album in October 2006, Hafdís and her band were asked to go on tour with Paolo Nutini on an 8-date sold-out tour of the UK. On these dates and her headline shows Hafdís performs with a three-piece band of Sarah Croft, Alisdair Wright and Steve Ling. The band use guitars, keyboards, ukulele, xylophone and banjo. Hafdís also toured venues and festivals across the UK and Europe, taking in The Glastonbury Festival, The Secret Garden Party, The Big Chill and Camden Crawl in the UK, Hultsfred Festival in Sweden, Airwaves in Iceland, Spot Festival in Denmark, Les Femmes S'en Melent and Europavox in France and the Midnight Sun Festival in the Czech Republic. In 2007 she supported Mika in London and performed at In the City in Manchester and South by Southwest in Texas, United States.

In February 2007, a headline UK tour was cancelled due to a serious lung infection, from which she took 6 weeks to recover. The dates were rescheduled to May 2007. On the rescheduled dates she performed "Boys and Perfume", a song from her (then unreleased) second album.

Hafdís was one of the guest vocalists on Tricky's 2008 album Knowle West Boy, performing on the track "Cross to Bear".

Hafdís recorded an a cappella version of the Sam Brown classic "Stop!", which was used on a pan-European TV ad campaign for Mercedes-Benz. A fully instrumented version of the track charted in Iceland on 8 October 2008 and had a worldwide release on 24 November 2008.

In 2009, Hafdís recorded a second solo album, Synchronised Swimmers. Two singles from the album went to No.1 in the Icelandic singles chart: "Kongulo" (which means "spider" in Icelandic and was written about the urban climber Alain Robert) reached No.1 in July 2009 and the title track from the album reached the top spot in October 2009. The album was released in Iceland in October 2009 and went straight into the chart at No.2. The album is available outside of Iceland, since July 2010.

== Personal life ==
Hafdís Huld is in a relationship with musician Alisdair Wright. In February 2012, Hafdís revealed that she was four months pregnant with their first child and was expecting in early July. In the summer of 2012, Hafdís gave birth to a daughter. Just before spring 2019, Hafdis announced they are expecting another child.

== Discography ==
=== Studio albums ===
- Dirty Paper Cup (2006)
- Synchronised Swimmers (2009)
- Vögguvísur (2012)
- Home (2014)
- Barnavísur (2015)
- Dare to Dream Small (2017)
- Variations (2019)
- Darkest Night (2024)

=== Singles ===
- "Who Loves the Sun"
- "Diamonds on My Belly"
- "Ski Jumper"
- "Tomoko"
- "Stop!"
- "Kónguló"
- "Synchronised Swimmers"
- "Action Man"
- "Queen Bee"

== Filmography ==
=== Film ===
- The Icelandic Dream (2000)
- Dramarama (Villiljós) (2001)

=== TV ===
- A Legend to Ride (1997)
