= Unreal World =

Studio album by the Godfathers
- Released: March 1991
- Recorded: Spring–summer 1990
- Studio: Elephant Studios, London (mixing at Real World Studios, Box, Wiltshire, October 1990)
- Genre: Alternative rock
- Length: 45:51
- Label: Epic
- Producer: Steve Brown

The Godfathers chronology
More Songs About Love and Hate (1989)	Unreal World (1991)	Dope, Rock 'n' Roll and Fucking in the Streets (1992)

Singles from Unreal World
- 1. "Unreal World" Released: 1991

Professional ratings
Review scores
Source	Rating
AllMusic	4.5/5 stars
Q	4/5 stars

Unreal World is the fourth studio album by alternative rock band the Godfathers, released by Epic Records in March 1991.

It was produced by Steve Brown (Wham!, the Cult, Manic Street Preachers), who had worked as a mixing engineer on the Godfathers' second album Birth, School, Work, Death. Unreal World marked the first Godfathers album to feature guitarist Chris Burrows, who replaced original member Kris Dollimore, and the last studio album with original members Michael Gibson (guitar) and George Mazur (drums). The album includes a cover of the Creation's 1968 single "How Does It Feel to Feel". Vic Maile, who produced the Godfathers' first three studio albums, had worked as an engineer on the original version by the Creation. Maile died of cancer in July 1989, shortly after completing work on the Godfathers' third album More Songs About Love and Hate.

Graeme Kaye in Q magazine noted that the album "builds on the same steadfastly foundations as its predecessor."

== Critical reception ==
Tom Demalon, writing for AllMusic, wrote that the band "deliver muscular and meaty rock and roll with the energy of the Ramones and the Stooges, and a nod toward '60s melodicism." He added that the album, "which gets stronger as it progresses," ranges from "the sweet, unabashed guitar pop" of "Believe in Yourself" and "Drag Me Down Again" to the metallic stomp of the equally hooky "Something Good About You" and "Can't Try Harder." He described the album as "a thunderous slab of rock played with passion and sincerity."

== Track listing ==
No.	Title	Writer(s)	Length
1.	"Unreal World"	Chris Burrows, Chris Coyne, Peter Coyne	4:11
2.	"Don't Let Me Down"	Burrows, C. Coyne, P. Coyne, Michael Gibson	3:25
3.	"King of Misery"	Burrows, C. Coyne, P. Coyne, Gibson, George Mazur	3:51
4.	"Believe in Yourself"	C. Coyne, P. Coyne, Gibson	4:21
5.	"I'll Never Forget What's His Name"	Burrows, C. Coyne, P. Coyne, Gibson	4:19
6.	"How Does It Feel to Feel"	Bob Garner, Eddie Phillips	3:51
7.	"Drag Me Down Again"	Burrows, P. Coyne	4:06
8.	"Something Good About You"	Burrows, C. Coyne, P. Coyne, Gibson	4:21
9.	"I Love What's Happening to Me"	Burrows, C. Coyne, P. Coyne, Gibson	4:29
10.	"Can't Try Harder"	Gibson	4:27
11.	"This Is War"	Burrows, C. Coyne, P. Coyne	4:38

Note

- Some vinyl versions omit track 10.

== Personnel ==
The Godfathers

- Peter Coyne – vocals
- Chris Coyne – bass, vocals
- Chris Burrows – guitar, vocals
- Michael Gibson – guitar, vocals
- George Mazur – drums, percussion, vocals

Technical

- Steve Brown – producer, engineer, mixing
- Nick Robbins – additional engineer (Elephant),
- Richard Chappell – additional engineer (Real World)
- Mainartery, London – sleeve Design
- Peter Ashworth – photography
