= A Big Bad Beautiful Noise =

Studio album by the Godfathers
- Released: 10 February 2017
- Recorded: 2015, summer 2016
- Studio: Bridge Studio, Birmingham; Cowshed Studio, London
- Genre: Rock
- Length: 40:32
- Label: Godfathers Recordings
- Producer: Steve Crittall; The Godfathers; Paul Robert Gray; Teo Miller

The Godfathers chronology
Jukebox Fury (2013)	A Big Bad Beautiful Noise (2017)	This Is War! The Godfathers Live! (2019)

Singles from A Big Bad Beautiful Noise
- 1. "You Don't Love Me" Released: 3 February 2017

A Big Bad Beautiful Noise is the eighth studio album by English rock band the Godfathers. It was released on 10 February 2017 on their own Godfathers Recordings label and distributed by Cargo in Europe and Metropolis in the US. It marks the first Godfathers album without bassist Chris Coyne, and the only album to feature the lineup of singer Peter Coyne with new members Steve Crittall (guitar), Mauro Venegas (guitar), Darren Birch (bass), and Tim James (drums).

== Background ==
Steve Crittall, Mauro Venegas and Tim James had joined the Godfathers in 2014 when the previous lineup had disintegrated. Joining founding members Peter and Chris Coyne, they recorded the double A-side vinyl single "Rewind Time"/"Till My Heart Stops Beating", which was released in June 2015. Chris Coyne left the band in 2016 and was replaced by Darren Birch just in time for the recording of A Big Bad Beautiful Noise.

The album was recorded in the summer of 2016 at Bridge Studio in Birmingham and mixed at Racknophobia Studio in London. The Birmingham studio was chosen after owner and engineer Paul Robert Gray – a friend of Birmingham residents Darren Birch and Tim James – offered his help and studio. Production duties were shared between Steve Crittall, Paul Robert Gray and the band. Gray also contributed percussion to a handful of tracks on the album. The only album track not recorded in Birmingham – "Till My Heart Stops Beating" – was produced by Teo Miller at London's Cowshed Studio and mixed at Retone Sound Studio. It was partially overdubbed and remixed for the album.

The album title comes from a phrase used by Peter Coyne to describe the band's music to journalists, and after seeing the quote written down in black and white print, he decided to turn it into a song. With its observations about modern life, and what Coyne describes as "the feeling of anti-establishment rebellion in the air and social disorder," he turned the song into "a joyous anthem."

Mauro Venegas left the band in 2017 and was replaced by Alex McBain. In 2019, the entire band was abruptly and controversially fired through Facebook by Peter Coyne, who later in the year assembled an all-new Godfathers lineup.

== Critical reception ==
Professional ratings
Review scores
Source	Rating
Classic Rock	3.5/5 stars
Is this music?	4.5/5 stars
The I-94 Bar	4.5/5 stars
Maximum Volume Music	8/10
New Noise Magazine	4/5 stars
Ox-Fanzine	3/5 stars
The Vinyl District	B

The album was well received by critics, who felt that the band maintained their signature sound while still sounding energetic and vital. Both Classic Rock and Pennyblackmusic felt it was the Godfathers' best album in three decades, and Louder Than War wrote that the album "will remind you of everything you liked about the Godfathers in the first place but has been updated in a vibrant way for 2017 ... replete with shit-hot musicianship, catchy songs, tonnes of conviction and a big bad attitude." Classic Rock stated, "The band still hop madly from foot to foot – Stiff Records one minute, Creation the next – but they have solidified over the years into a definably hard rock'n'roll band." The Agit Reader felt that the album contained some "ham-fisted lyrics," and songs that "never seem to get off the ground, no matter how ferociously they're played." However, as a whole, they described the album as "an undeniable, flat out rocker that not only makes you turn it up, but also dig into the back catalog."

== Track listing ==
All tracks are written by Peter Coyne and Steve Crittall, except where noted.

No.	Title	Writer(s)	Length
1.	"A Big Bad Beautiful Noise"		4:16
2.	"Till My Heart Stops Beating"		4:04
3.	"You Don't Love Me"	Coyne, Mauro Venegas	3:07
4.	"Poor Boy's Son"		2:57
5.	"One Good Reason"		2:52
6.	"Miss America"	Coyne, Venegas	4:05
7.	"Defibrillator"		2:10
8.	"She's Mine"		3:52
9.	"Feedbacking"	Coyne, Venegas	4:37
10.	"Let's Get Higher"		3:12
11.	"You and Me Against the World"	Coyne, Venegas	5:16

== Personnel ==
Adapted from the album liner notes.

The Godfathers

- Peter Coyne – vocals, lyrics
- Steve Crittall – guitar, slide guitar, backing vocals, theremin (6), Farfisa organ (4), programming (4)
- Mauro Venegas – guitar, acoustic guitar, backing vocals
- Darren Birch – bass, acoustic bass, backing vocals
- Tim James – drums, backing vocals

Additional musicians

- John Dale – keyboards (4, 9, 11)
- Paul Robert Gray – percussion (1, 3, 6, 8)

Technical

- Steve Crittall – producer (1, 4, 5, 7, 8, 10), mixing (1, 3–11)
- The Godfathers – producer (3, 6, 9, 11)
- Paul Robert Gray – producer, mixing (3, 6, 9, 11), additional recording and remix (2)
- Teo Miller – producer, mixing (2)
- Andy Pearce – mastering
- Jaime Martin – artwork
