= Joey's Song (CD series) =

Joey's Song Foundation
- Formation: 2010
- Founder: Michael Gomoll
- Founded at: Madison, Wisconsin, United States
- Type: 501(c)(3) nonprofit organization
- Legal status: Active
- Purpose: Epilepsy research funding and awareness
- Headquarters: Madison, Wisconsin
- Services: Benefit concerts, grant funding
- Founder: Michael Gomoll
- Affiliations: CURE Epilepsy, Epilepsy Foundation
- Website: joeyssong.org

Joey's Song (also known as the Joseph Gomoll Foundation) is a 501(c)(3) nonprofit organization based in Madison, Wisconsin, founded in 2010 by Michael Gomoll in memory of his son Joey, who died from Dravet syndrome, a severe form of epilepsy, shortly before his fifth birthday. The organization raises money for epilepsy research, education, and community programs through an annual benefit concert series known as Freezing Man, held each January in Madison. All artists who perform at Freezing Man donate their time, and the organization operates entirely on a volunteer basis, directing all net proceeds to epilepsy-related causes.

As of January 2026, Joey's Song has raised more than $2 million for epilepsy research since its founding. The Freezing Man concert series has sold out annually since 2014 and has drawn performers including members of Garbage, The Bangles, Goo Goo Dolls, Tears for Fears, The Go-Go's, Letters to Cleo, Soul Asylum, Silversun Pickups, Cheap Trick, Belly, Eve 6, Fountains of Wayne, Gang of Four, and Portugal. The Man, among others.

== Background ==
=== Joey Gomoll and the founding of the organization ===
Joey Gomoll was born in Madison, Wisconsin, and was diagnosed with Dravet syndrome, a rare and severe form of childhood epilepsy, early in his life. The condition left him nonverbal, though his father, Michael Gomoll, has described music as a consistent and meaningful presence in Joey's daily life. "His Dravet made him nonverbal, but when music came on, and if there was anybody who had the gall to be in our living room and not be dancing when the music started, Joe, he would grab your finger and make sure that you did," Gomoll said in a 2026 interview. Joey died shortly before his fifth birthday in 2010.

Following Joey's death, Michael Gomoll established the Joseph Gomoll Foundation as a 501(c)(3) nonprofit organization. The foundation's mission centers on funding epilepsy research and supporting program services for children and families living with epilepsy and related conditions, with a particular focus on Dravet syndrome.

== History ==
Joey's Song held its first fundraising event in 2010. What began as a small gathering in Madison grew steadily over the following years as the organization attracted increasingly prominent musical artists who volunteered their performances. Gomoll has credited the Madison music scene and personal relationships formed through it for the foundation's early growth, including a reconnection with musician and record producer Butch Vig, who had known Gomoll from his time as a stage manager at Headliners, a Madison rock venue where Vig's pre-Garbage band Spooner frequently performed.

The benefit concerts operated under several formats in their early years before the current Freezing Man incarnation was established. "Since our first fundraiser in 2010, Joey's Song has hosted very memorable annual events to support epilepsy research and education, and Freezing Man is the latest and most exciting incarnation of that tradition," Gomoll said in a statement released ahead of the 2026 concerts.

The Freezing Man name is a reference to the annual Burning Man festival held in Nevada, reflecting the winter timing of the Madison event. The name has become the primary public identity for the concert series in recent years.

The concert series has sold out every year since 2014.

== Freezing Man Festival ==
=== Format ===
Freezing Man spans multiple nights each January in Madison, Wisconsin. The 2026 edition, representative of the event's current format, featured two headline nights at The Sylvee, a music venue in downtown Madison. Friday night concerts are presented in an acoustic, unplugged format in which artists perform seated, discuss the origins of their songs, and collaborate in songwriter-in-the-round arrangements. Saturday nights feature full electric performances organized around a rotating supergroup concept, in which artists from across the lineup perform together in various combinations throughout the evening.

A recurring feature of the Saturday night concert is the "Battle of the Bands," in which the all-male house band, the Know-It-All Boyfriends, faces off against an all-female counterpart, the Know-It-All Girlfriends, in a performance of songs selected at random. The concert typically closes with an extended all-star jam session. Between sets, founder Michael Gomoll conducts live auctions of autographed instruments, concert posters, and VIP packages, with all proceeds supporting the foundation's epilepsy research mission.

=== House band and musical direction ===
The Know-It-All Boyfriends serve as the house band for the Freezing Man concerts. The group originated informally when Butch Vig, Duke Erikson of Garbage, and musician Freedy Johnston began performing together as an unrehearsed covers group at small Madison venues. Vig has described the group's early approach as deliberately casual. "We called ourselves the world's greatest and worst cover band because we would never practice," Vig told Billboard in 2026. As the Freezing Man concerts grew in scale, the Boyfriends became the official backing band for the full rotating roster of guest performers.

Vig serves as musical director for the festival in addition to performing as a member of the house band. In recent years the concerts have incorporated a full Thursday rehearsal day ahead of the weekend performances, a departure from the group's earlier no-rehearsal tradition.

=== Satellite programming ===
In addition to the main Sylvee concerts, Freezing Man has expanded to include satellite shows at other Madison venues, including the Majestic Theatre, featuring smaller configurations of artists from the broader weekend lineup. The 2025 festival opened with a Wednesday evening show at the Majestic Theatre and moved to The Sylvee for the main weekend performances.

=== Ticket pricing and access ===
General admission tickets for Freezing Man have been priced at $50, with the concerts selling out in advance each year since 2014. A livestream option is made available for audiences unable to attend in person.

== Performers ==
All artists who appear at Freezing Man perform without compensation. "Nobody that's appearing on that stage is taking a penny," Gomoll said following the 2025 concerts. "A lot of them make a lot of money when they play music and they do it for free; many of them doing it for three and four nights so we've got this amazing group of folks."

Artists are drawn primarily from the alternative rock, post-punk, and pop rock genres of the 1980s and 1990s, though the lineup has included performers from comedy, Broadway, and other disciplines. Many artists return to Freezing Man across multiple years. Among the performers who have appeared at Joey's Song events are:

- Butch Vig and Duke Erikson of Garbage
- Vicki Peterson of The Bangles
- John Rzeznik of Goo Goo Dolls
- Curt Smith of Tears for Fears
- Jane Wiedlin and Gina Schock of The Go-Go's
- Kay Hanley and Stacy Jones of Letters to Cleo
- Jeremy Tappero and Ryan Smith of Soul Asylum
- Brian Aubert and Nikki Monninger of Silversun Pickups
- Rick Nielsen and Daxx Nielsen of Cheap Trick
- Gail Greenwood of Belly
- Max Collins of Eve 6
- Chris Collingwood of Fountains of Wayne
- Hugo Burnham of Gang of Four
- John Gourley of Portugal. The Man
- Matt Sorum, formerly of Guns N' Roses
- Freedy Johnston
- Tracy Bonham
- Comedian Charlie Berens

== Beneficiaries ==
Proceeds from the Freezing Man concerts are distributed to organizations focused on epilepsy research, education, and family support services. Named beneficiaries have included CURE Epilepsy, select affiliates of the Epilepsy Foundation, and Wisconsin Badger Camp, a nonprofit summer camp serving individuals with epilepsy and related conditions.

The organization describes itself as entirely volunteer-run, directing all net proceeds to its charitable partners rather than operational overhead.

== Impact ==
Joey's Song has raised more than $2 million for epilepsy research since its founding in 2010. The 2025 festival alone raised more than $400,000.

The festival has received coverage from national music media, including Billboard, which in January 2026 published a feature on the event's history, format, and charitable mission. Local coverage has included reporting by The Capital Times, WMTV-15 (NBC Madison), WKOW-27 (ABC Madison), and Isthmus.

The festival has drawn artists from across the country, including performers based in California who traveled to Madison for the 2025 concerts while the Los Angeles wildfires were actively affecting the region. "We have many artists here that flew in that don't know if they're going to have houses to go back to," Gomoll noted following the conclusion of that year's event.
