= Kris Dollimore =

- Born: 2 January 1966 (age 60); Isle of Sheppey, Kent, England
- Genres: Rock; blues
- Occupations: Musician, guitarist, songwriter
- Instruments: Guitar, vocals
- Years active: 1980s–present
- Label: Sun Pier Recordings
- Member of: Del Amitri
- Formerly of: The Major Setback Band; The Godfathers; The Brotherland; The Damned
- Website: krisdollimore.com

Kris Dollimore (born 2 January 1966) is an English rock guitarist, who is best known for being a founding member of the Godfathers as well as a member of the Damned and Del Amitri. He also performs and records as a solo artist.

== Biography ==
Kris Dollimore was born on the Isle of Sheppey in northern Kent, where he lived until the age of 19 when he moved to London. His first appearance on a recording was in 1984 as guitarist and lead vocalist on the sole album by the pub rock-ish Major Setback Band, which also included his older brother Ian on bass. The following year, at age 19, he co-formed alternative rock band the Godfathers, with whom he recorded three albums.

After leaving the Godfathers in 1990, Dollimore participated in a demo recording session for Stiv Bators (Dead Boys, the Lords of the New Church). The demo tracks were released in 1996 on Bator's posthumously released Last Race album. Also in 1990, Dollimore formed hard rock band the Brotherland with bassist Nick Chown (the Bolshoi) and drummer Steve "Vom" Ritchie (Doctor and the Medics), with Dollimore handling guitar and vocal duties. They released one album in 1991.

In 1993, Dollimore was asked to join the Damned, with whom he toured for about two years and recorded the album Not of This Earth in 1995. Also in 1995, he toured with Adam Ant, supporting the Wonderful album. He joined Scottish alternative rock band Del Amitri in 1997 for their Some Other Sucker's Parade tour and participated in the recording of their 2002 album Can You Do Me Good? With fellow Del Amitri guitarist Iain Harvie, Dollimore served as musician and producer on American singer-songwriter Eileen Rose's Party Dress EP and Long Shot Novena album, released in 2001 and 2002, respectively. Both releases were recorded at Dollimore and Harvie's Troy Town Studios in Rochester, England.

Del Amitri went on hiatus in 2002, after which Dollimore formed the short-lived the Germans in 2003. The band, which included former Damned drummer Rat Scabies and Godfathers vocalist Peter Coyne, played a few gigs and recorded a demo before disbanding a year later. In the 2000s, Dollimore began performing as a solo artist playing blues. He released his first solo album 02/01/1978 in 2007. The date in the title represents the day he received his first guitar on his twelfth birthday. Dollimore has cited blues artists such as Robert Johnson and John Lee Hooker as well as fingerstyle guitarist John Fahey as inspiration. His mainly self-penned and acoustic material is recorded, and usually performed, without a band. All his solo albums are released through his own label Sun Pier Recordings.

In 2008, Dollimore joined a reformed the Godfathers for a reunion tour but left again in 2009. Del Amitri, including Dollimore, reformed for tours in 2014 and 2018, and in 2021 released their first album in 19 years, Fatal Mistakes.

== Discography ==
Solo

- 02/01/1978 (2007)
- Now Was the Time (2009)
- No Ghosts in This House (2011)
- All Grown Up (2015)

With the Major Setback Band

- Crashing Out! (1984), Black Sheep

With the Godfathers

- Hit by Hit (1986)
- Birth, School, Work, Death (1988)
- More Songs About Love and Hate (1989)

With the Brotherland

- Nightmares and Dreams (1991)

With the Damned

- Not of This Earth (1995)

With Del Amitri

- Can You Do Me Good? (2002)
- Into the Mirror: Del Amitri Live in Concert (2014)
- Fatal Mistakes (2021)
