= More Songs About Love & Hate =

Studio album by the Godfathers
- Released: May 1989
- Recorded: Winter 1988–1989
- Studio: Elephant Studios, Wapping, London (Mixed at Odyssey Studios, London, February 1989)
- Genre: Alternative rock
- Length: 39:09
- Label: Epic
- Producer: Vic Maile

The Godfathers chronology
Birth, School, Work, Death (1988)	More Songs About Love & Hate (1989)	Unreal World (1991)

Singles from More Songs About Love & Hate
- 1. "She Gives Me Love" Released: April 1989; 2. "I'm Lost and Then I'm Found" Released: February 1990

USA cover art
- The US artwork featured a band photo.

Professional ratings
Review scores
Source	Rating
AllMusic	4/5 stars

More Songs About Love and Hate is the third studio album by alternative rock band the Godfathers, released in May 1989 by Epic Records. It reached number 49 on the UK Albums Chart. The UK album cover shows Richard Burton and Elizabeth Taylor. It was the last Godfathers album to feature guitarist Kris Dollimore, who was replaced by Chris Burrows for 1991's Unreal World.

== Critical reception ==
In a contemporary review in The Washington Post, Mark Jenkins argued that the album lacks great songs, calling it "11 songs in search of a hit." He, however, felt that it is more consistent than its predecessor Birth, School, Work, Death, writing, "None of the material soars, but only "Another You" sounds disposable." Jenkins highlighted "Walking Talking Johnny Cash Blues," a "change-of-pace" track with a "country flavor," as one of the album's best tracks. He concluded that More Songs About Love and Hate shows the band "sliding back into the amiable but underwhelming rut of such pub rock also-rans as Ducks Deluxe. The songs keep reaching for hooks - the submerged "yeah yeah yeahs" of "Pretty Girl," the pounding finale to "This Is Your Life," the bells that end the album-closing "Another You" - to distinguish generic melodies."

In a retrospective review, AllMusic's Mark Deming also felt that the album lacked an "instant classic single" like the title track from their previous album, but "otherwise it came close to matching that album's muscle and fury and confirmed the band had plenty of offer." Deming noted that the album had "just a dash more polish" than the band's previous work, and "their tough, meat-and-potatoes sound had picked up a bit more heft and precision along the way." He concluded that "while the songs on More Songs About Love and Hate aren't always as memorable as [Birth, School, Work, Death], there aren't any outright duds either," calling the album a "fine work".

== Track listing ==
All tracks are written by the Godfathers

No.	Title	Length
1.	"She Gives Me Love"	3:34
2.	"Those Days Are Over"	3:29
3.	"How Low Is Low?"	3:26
4.	"Pretty Girl"	4:00
5.	"This Is Your Life"	3:57
6.	"I'm Lost and Then I'm Found"	3:58
7.	"I Don't Believe in You"	3:29
8.	"Life Has Passed Us By"	4:03
9.	"Walking Talking Johnny Cash Blues"	3:06
10.	"Halfway Paralysed"	2:43
11.	"Another You"	3:24
Total length:		39:09

2011 expanded edition bonus tracks
No.	Title	Length
12.	"Just Because You're Not Paranoid Doesn't Mean to Say They're Not Going to Get You!" (B-side of "She Gives Me Love")	2:25
13.	"Still Alone" (B-side of "I'm Lost and Then I'm Found")	3:38
14.	"Birth, School, Work, Death" (Ex Mix)	4:42
15.	"She Gives Me Love" (High Octane Mix)	3:44
16.	"She Gives Me Love" (Extended Mix)	5:30
Total length:		59:00

Note

- Tracks 14–16 from Out on the Floor EP, 1990. Track 14 remixed by Steve Brown, tracks 15 and 16 remixed by Keith LeBlanc.

== Personnel ==
Adapted from the album liner notes.

The Godfathers

- Peter Coyne – lead vocals
- Chris Coyne – bass, backing vocals
- Kris Dollimore – guitar, keyboards, backing vocals
- Mike Gibson – guitar, backing vocals
- George Mazur – drums, percussion, backing vocals

Additional musicians

- Harold Burgon – additional keyboards

Technical

- Vic Maile – producer
- Harold Burgon – engineer
- Mike Bisgrove – sound engineer
- Andy Wallace – mixing
- Grant Louden – sleeve
- Jean Luke Epstein – sleeve
- Bleddyn Gutz – cover illustration
- Paul Cox – photography

== Charts ==
Chart performance for More Songs About Love & Hate

Chart (1989)	Peak Position
UK Albums Chart	49
Swiss Albums	29
