= Vic Maile =

British record producer (1943-1989)

Vic Maile (26 February 1943 – 11 July 1989) was a British record producer. After starting his career as sound engineer with Pye mobile studios for the Animals on their song "We Gotta Get Out of This Place", Maile worked with some of the biggest names in the music industry, such as Fleetwood Mac, Jimi Hendrix, Led Zeppelin, Eric Clapton, the Pirates, Hawkwind, Motörhead, the Godfathers, the Kinks, Small Faces, the Inmates, Dr. Feelgood, the Screaming Blue Messiahs, the Lords of the New Church, Girlschool and Michael Moorcock & the Deep Fix.

== Career ==
Maile was partly responsible for the recording of the 1970 live album Live at Leeds by the Who, although the production is credited to the band. He produced the 1980 album Ace of Spades by Motörhead, followed by their chart-topping live album, No Sleep 'til Hammersmith.

He also produced albums such as Birth, School, Work, Death and More Songs About Love and Hate by the Godfathers, Bikini Red by the Screaming Blue Messiahs, and the single "2-4-6-8 Motorway" by Tom Robinson. He produced Action Replay with Masterswitch in 1978. Maile also worked with the Inmates and the Vibrators, 999, Brinsley Schwarz and Hawkwind. He also helped produce the Guns N' Roses Japan-exclusive release "Live from the Jungle", having recorded the American rockers at the Marquee Club in London.

In Chris Coyne's (bass player of the Godfathers) words: "When we were looking for a producer, we remembered "Dirty Love", the B-side of the "Ace of Spades" single. The sound was just incredible, so we rang up Vic expecting this Lemmy-like biker figure but he turned out to be a quiet, unassuming sort of bloke - a real diamond geezer."

Motörhead's Lemmy also said "Vic's strength was that he understood rock and roll. He wasn't like a lot of producers who simply rely on the readings from the meters on the desk - he was instinctive and he had the same sense of humour as me. Basically he was a c**t!!".

Peter Gunn of the Inmates recalls that just before he died, Maile phoned him to say that he had been listening to his productions and concluded that "Shot in the Dark" by the Inmates was his best work. "Vic kept his illness a secret so the true significance of this remark was only realised after his sad and untimely death - he is very much missed as a friend and a great producer".

Maile's song, "6.10 Phoenix", appeared on Don Fardon's 2000 album Indian Reservation & I've Paid My Dues on Edsel Records.

Maile died, at the age of 45, from cancer on 11 July 1989.

== Discography ==
=== Singles ===
- 1981 - "Not Fade Away (song)"/"It's the Same Old Thing" (Bronze Records BRO 129 UK)
