= FC Kahuna =

British DJ and music production duo

- Origin: London, England
- Genres: Big beat, electronica, trip hop, acid house
- Years active: 1997–2003
- Labels: Kahuna Cuts, City Rockers
- Past members: Jon Nowell; Daniel Ormondroyd

FC Kahuna (also known as FC/Kahuna) was a British DJ and electronic music production duo, consisting of Jon Nowell and Daniel Ormondroyd. The group released only one album, Machine Says Yes, in the spring of 2002. It had a number of singles released from it, most notably "Machine Says Yes" and "Hayling", which both featured vocals by Icelandic singer Hafdís Huld. The album sold over 50,000 copies and received positive response from critics at New Musical Express, Dallas Observer, and others.

== History ==
In 2003, they released their first mix album Another Fine Mess — an offshoot of the Another Late Night compilation series — which featured tracks by Blur, The Polyphonic Spree, Green Velvet, Josh Wink and others. Among the artists remixed by the band are New Order, Felix da Housecat, Mellow and the US band The Faint.

The music of the duo was featured in TV shows such as Hotel Babylon, Monkey Dust, Six Feet Under, CSI: Miami and Nip/Tuck, and in films such as Domino, Layer Cake, Riding Giants and Rolling. The music for several video games have also featured music from the duo, including Need for Speed: Underground and Crackdown.

== Members ==
- Daniel Ormondroyd – production, instrumentation, mixing, programming (1997–2003)
- Jon Nowell – production, instrumentation, engineering, mixing, programming (1997–2003)
- Hafdis Huld - vocals (2002–2003)

== Live performances ==
Originally a DJ duo, FC Kahuna added some live members to their shows in 2002, touring the UK in support of Röyksopp, which culminated in a sold-out show at Brixton Academy.

=== Members ===
- Daniel Ormondroyd – keyboards, samples, mixing, programming
- Jon Nowell – drums
- Hafdis Huld – vocals

with

- Martin Bramah – guitars, keyboards
- John Thompson – bass

The band also played at Coachella in Southern California, T in the Park in Scotland, Roskilde in Denmark, Reading and Leeds in England, and Benicàssim in Spain.

== Partial discography ==
=== Albums ===
- Machine Says Yes (2002)
- Another Fine Mess (2003)

=== Singles and EPs ===
- "You Know It Makes Sense" (1997)
- "Bright Morning White" (1998)
- "Mind Set to Cycle" (2000)
- "Glitterball" (2002) – UK #64
- "Machine Says Yes" (2002) – UK #58
- "Hayling" (2003) – UK #49
- "Nothing Is Wrong" (2003)
