= The Godfathers =

English alternative rock band

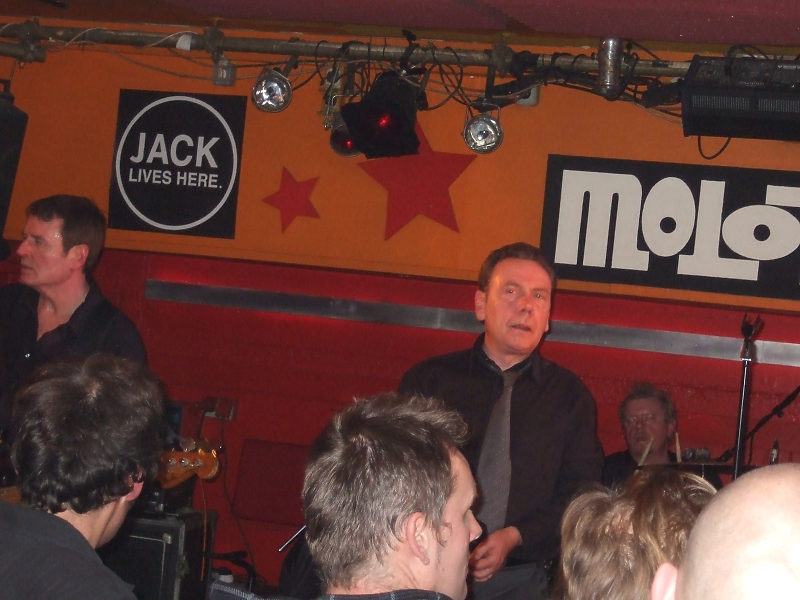
- The Godfathers performing in Hamburg in 2009

Background information
- Origin: London, England
- Genres: Rock; alternative rock
- Years active: 1985–2000; 2008–present
- Labels: Corporate Image; Epic; Intercord Records
- Members: Peter Coyne; Jon Priestley; Billy Duncanson; Paul Humphreys; Richie Simpson
- Past members: Steve Crittall; Alex McBain; Tim James; Darren Birch; Chris Coyne; Kris Dollimore; Mike Gibson; George Mazur; Chris Burrows; Ali Byworth; Paul-Ronney Angel; Ronnie Rocka; Del Bartle; Grant Nicholas; Dave Twigg; Mauro Venegas; Wayne Vermaak
- Website: thegodfathersofficial.com

The Godfathers are an English alternative rock band from London, England, with strong influences from R&B and punk.

== Career ==
The Godfathers were formed by Peter and Chris Coyne (vocals and bass, respectively) after the demise of The Sid Presley Experience in 1985, joined by Mike Gibson (guitar), Kris Dollimore (guitar) and George Mazur (drums). Peter Coyne had briefly worked as a music journalist from 1980 to 1982 for ZigZag and Record Mirror. Fellow TSPE member, and later Godfather, Del Bartle, went on to form The Unholy Trinity with drummer Kevin Murphy.

After independent single releases produced by Vic Maile, and collected on their debut album, Hit by Hit, they signed to Epic Records in 1987. Extensive tours of the UK, Europe and the United States followed. Single and title track of their first album "Birth, School, Work, Death" made the U.S. Billboard Top 40 in 1988 after college radio and MTV airplay but the band were less commercially successful in the UK.

Albums More Songs About Love and Hate (1989) and Unreal World (1991) followed, with Chris Burrows replacing Kris Dollimore on guitar in time for the latter, after which the Godfathers left Epic and released a live album and two studio albums on German label Intercord in the early to mid-1990s. The band ceased activity in 2000.

In 2003, Peter Coyne and Kris Dollimore played briefly in a band called the Germans with Rat Scabies, formerly of the Damned.

=== Reformation ===
In 2008, the band reformed with its original line-up. On February 14, 2009 the band did one show in the U.S.A., at Metro in Chicago, advertised as St. Valentine's Day Massacre. In March 2009, the band announced a change with Del Bartle returning to replace Kris Dollimore. Grant Nicholas later replaced George Mazur on drums, and Mike Gibson also left the band. In 2010, a live album, Shot Live at the 100 Club, was released as a CD/DVD set on Secret Records.

2011 saw the band release two download-only singles "Back Into the Future" and "The Outsider". "Primitive Man" followed the next year and all were included on their comeback album Jukebox Fury, released in 2013. Promotion for the album included a month-long UK tour supporting the Stranglers and drummer Dave Twigg stepping in for recently departed Grant Nicholas. 2014 saw another fresh line-up change, with two new guitarists, Mauro Venegas and Steve Crittall, replacing Del Bartle, and Tim James replacing (the recently returned) Grant Nicholas on drums. A new double-sided single, "Till My Heart Stops Beating" / "Rewind Time" was released in June 2015, and the band undertook several European and UK tours, also celebrating their 30th anniversary with a headline show at the 100 Club where they played 30 songs – one for each year – over the course of two sets.

In 2016, Chris Coyne left the band and was replaced by Darren Birch, formerly of Gunfire Dance, and touring bassist for both Walter Lure and Brian James (ex-the Damned). The new line-up recorded a new album, A Big Bad Beautiful Noise, in Birmingham that summer, which was released in February 2017, preceded by a single, "You Don't Love Me". Reviews hailed the album as the band's best in many years, with Vive Le Rock claiming it was "up there with the Godfathers' '80s classics".

During the A Big Bad Beautiful Noise 2017 tour through Europe, Mauro Venegas left the band and was replaced by guitarist Alex McBain.

In 2019, Peter Coyne announced he had fired the previous Godfathers line-up, stating that he can "no longer work, tour or perform with Steve, Tim, Alex and Darren." With a new line-up consisting of bassist Jon Priestley, guitarists Richie Simpson and Paul Humphreys, and drummer Billy Duncanson, Coyne and the revamped Godfathers released the double A-side single "I'm Not Your Slave"/"Wild and Free" on 17 June 2020, followed by the album Alpha Beta Gamma Delta in September 2022.

== Discography ==
=== Studio albums ===
- Hit by Hit (1986, Corporate Image) – UK Indie No. 3
- Birth, School, Work, Death (1988, Epic) – UK No. 80
- More Songs About Love & Hate (1989, Epic) - UK No. 49
- Unreal World (1991, Epic)
- The Godfathers (aka The Orange Album) (1993, Intercord)
- Afterlife (1995, Intercord)
- Jukebox Fury (2013, Godfathers Recordings)
- A Big Bad Beautiful Noise (2017, Godfathers Recordings)
- Alpha Beta Gamma Delta (2022, Godfathers Recordings)

=== Live albums ===
- Dope, Rock 'n' Roll and Fucking in the Streets (1992, Corporate Image)
- Shot Live at the 100 Club (2011, Secret Records Limited) – includes live DVD
- This Is War! The Godfathers Live! (2019, Godfathers Recordings)

=== Compilation albums and reissues ===
- Birth, School, Work, Death: The Best of the Godfathers (1996, Epic)
- Birth, School, Work, Death: Hits, Rarities and Gems (2007, CMG)
- Hit By Hit [2CD edition] (2008, Corporate Image)
- Birth, School, Work, Death [expanded edition] (2011, Lemon Recordings)
- More Songs About Love and Hate [expanded edition] (2011, Lemon Recordings)
- The Godfathers (aka The Orange Album) [2CD edition] (2013, Godfathers Recordings)

=== Extended plays ===
Title	Year	Label	Tracks
Capo Di Tutti Capi	1985	Corporate Image	"Lonely Man"; "I Want You"; "Sticks and Stones" (recorded September 1985)
The Radio One Sessions – The Evening Show	1989	Strange Fruit; Nighttracks	"If I Only Had Time"; "I Want Everything"; "I'm Unsatisfied"; "I Wan't You" (recorded May 1986)
Out on the Floor	1990	Epic	"I'm Lost and Then I'm Found" (album version); "Birth, School, Work, Death" (Extended Mix); "She Gives Me Love" (Keith LeBlanc Love Mix); "She Gives Me Love" (Mega Dance Mix Authority)
Live in Texas E.P.	1990	Epic	"I'm Lost and Then I'm Found"; "Walking Talking Johnny Cash Blues"; "Blitzkrieg Bop"; "How Low Is Low?" (recorded live July 1989)
A Big Bad Beautiful E.P.	2017	Godfathers Recordings	"A Big Bad Beautiful Noise"; "You're So Slow"; "Defibrillator" (High Voltage Mix); "Human Zoo"
Midnight Rider	2022	Godfathers Recordings	"Midnight Rider"; "OCD"; "When the Cowards Fall"; "Fade Away"
I Hate the 21st Century	2023	Godfathers Recordings	"I Hate the 21st Century"; "You Gotta Wait"; "Straight Down the Line" (acoustic version); "Tonight" (acoustic version)

=== Singles ===
Year	Title	UK	UK Indie Chart	U.S. Modern Rock	U.S. Mainstream Rock	Album
1986	"This Damn Nation"	-	37	-	-	Hit by Hit
1986	"Sun Arise"	-	6	-	-	Hit by Hit
1987	"Love Is Dead"	-	3	-	-	Non-album single
1987	"Birth, School, Work, Death"	80	-	-	38	Birth, School, Work, Death
1988	"Cause I Said So"	-	-	-	-	Birth, School, Work, Death
1988	"Love Is Dead" (re-recorded version)	100	-	-	-	Birth, School, Work, Death
1989	"She Gives Me Love"	86	-	8	-	More Songs About Love and Hate
1990	"I'm Lost and Then I'm Found"	-	-	-	-	More Songs About Love and Hate
1991	"Unreal World"	83	-	6	-	Unreal World
1993	"Strange About Today"	-	-	-	-	The Godfathers
1995	"That Special Feeling"	-	-	-	-	Afterlife
2011	"Back Into the Future"	-	-	-	-	Jukebox Fury
2011	"The Outsider"	-	-	-	-	Jukebox Fury
2012	"Primitive Man"	-	-	-	-	Jukebox Fury
2015	"Rewind Time" * / "Till My Heart Stops Beating"	-	-	-	-	A Big Bad Beautiful Noise * (not on album)
2017	"You Don't Love Me"	-	-	-	-	A Big Bad Beautiful Noise * (not on album)
2020	"I'm Not Your Slave" / "Wild and Free" *	-	-	-	-	Alpha Beta Gamma Delta * (not on album)
2022	"Midnight Rider"	-	-	-	-	Alpha Beta Gamma Delta * (not on album)

=== Other appearances ===
- "Cause I Said So" appeared on the soundtrack to the 1988 film Permanent Record.
- "It's So Hard" appeared on the 7" compilation Sounds – Waves 2, which was given away with Sounds magazine's March 1988 issue.

== Band members ==
=== Current members ===
- Peter Coyne – lead vocals (1985–2000; 2008–present)
- Jon Priestley – bass, backing vocals (2019–present)
- Richie Simpson – guitar, backing vocals (2019–present)
- Billy Duncanson – drums, backing vocals (2019–present)
- Paul Humphreys - guitar, backing vocals (2023-present)
