= Birth, School, Work, Death =

Studio album by the Godfathers
- Released: February 1988
- Recorded: Summer 1987
- Studios: Elephant, Wapping, London
- Genre: Alternative rock
- Length: 36:57
- Label: Epic
- Producer: Vic Maile

The Godfathers chronology
Hit by Hit (1986)	Birth, School, Work, Death (1988)	More Songs About Love & Hate (1989)

Singles from Birth, School, Work, Death
- 1. "Birth, School, Work, Death" Released: 1987; 2. "Cause I Said So" Released: 1988; 3. "Love Is Dead" Released: 1988

Birth, School, Work, Death is the second studio album by the alternative rock band the Godfathers, released in February 1988 by Epic. It peaked at number 80 in the UK Albums Chart in February 1988.

Birth, School, Work, Death was reissued in 2011 by Cherry Red Records imprint label Lemon Recordings in an expanded edition.

== Critical reception ==
Professional ratings
Review scores
Source	Rating
AllMusic	4.5/5 stars
New Musical Express	5/10

Michael Sutton, writing for AllMusic, called the band's sound "tough," describing it as "brass-knuckled punches in the form of menacing, explosive riffs; venom-spewing, nihilistic vocals; body-slamming percussion." He added, "Yet the Godfathers never forget the importance of the hook." Trouser Press concurred, feeling that the album "seethes with the anger and aggression that seems to have all but gone out of non-hardcore British post-punk rock."

== Track listing ==
All tracks are written by the Godfathers, except where noted.

1. "Birth, School, Work, Death" – 4:08
2. "If I Only Had Time" – 2:29
3. "Tell Me Why" – 2:50
4. "It's So Hard" – 3:39
5. "When Am I Coming Down" – 4:55
6. "Cause I Said So" – 2:46
7. "The Strangest Boy" – 3:58
8. "S.T.B." – 2:32
9. "Just Like You" – 3:10
10. "Obsession" – 3:48
11. "Love Is Dead" – 2:42

Note

- "Love Is Dead" is a re-recording of the band's 1987 single.

2011 expanded edition bonus tracks

12. "Miss That Girl" (B-Side of "Birth, School, Work, Death") – 2:50
13. "I Can Only Give You Everything" (Phil Coulter, Tommy Scott) (B-Side of "Cause I Said So") – 3:03
14. "When Am I Coming Down" (live) (B-Side of "Cause I Said So") – 4:19
15. "Cold Turkey" (John Lennon) (live) (B-Side of "Cause I Said So") – 4:28
16. "Those Days Are Over" (live) (B-Side of "Love Is Dead") – 3:32
17. "I'm Unsatisfied" (live) (B-Side of "Love Is Dead") – 3:18
- Tracks 14–17 recorded live at Cabaret Metro, Chicago, Illinois, March 26, 1988. Recorded and mixed by Timothy R. Powell, except 16 and 17 mixed by Vic Maile.

== Personnel ==
The Godfathers

- Chris Coyne – bass, vocals
- Peter Coyne – vocals
- Kris Dollimore – guitar, vocals
- Michael Gibson – guitar, vocals
- George Mazur – drums, percussion, vocals

Additional musicians

- Bobby Valentino – violin (track 4)

Technical

- Vic Maile – producer, mixing (track 5)
- Harold Burgon – recording engineer
- Ron St. Germain – mixing (tracks 2, 3, 5, 8, 10)
- Steve Brown – mixing (tracks 1, 4, 6, 7, 9, 11)
- Jean Luke Epstein – sleeve design
- Kevin Davies – back cover photography

== Cover versions ==
The Serbian alternative rock band Supernaut covered the song "If I Only Had Time" with lyrics in Serbian language entitled "Zločin" ("Crime") on their 2006 album Eli. Manhead covered the song "Birth, School, Work, Death" in 2004. Local H covered "Birth, School, Work, Death" on The No Fun EP, released in 2003.

== Charts ==
Chart performance for Birth, School, Work, Death

Chart (1988)	Peak Position
UK Albums Chart	80
Canada Top Albums/CDs (RPM)	83
