= City Rockers =

British independent record label

City Rockers is a British independent record label. Their current signed artists include The Sunshine Underground, The Ghost Frequency and The Blood Arm.

Past releases on the label came from bands such as FC Kahuna, The Rakes, Felix Da Housecat, The Duke Spirit and The Boggs.

City Rockers was started by Phil Howells after Warner Bros. Records purchased and restructured London/FFRR. Damian Lazarus, the owner of Crosstown Rebels, was the head of A&R.
