= Special Moves =

Live album by Mogwai
- Released: 23 August 2010
- Recorded: The Music Hall of Williamsburg, Brooklyn
- Genre: Post-rock
- Length: 74:42
- Label: Rock Action
- Producer: John Cummings

Mogwai chronology
The Hawk Is Howling (2008)	Special Moves (2010)	Hardcore Will Never Die, But You Will (2011)

Special Moves is a live album by Scottish post-rock band Mogwai, released on 23 August 2010 through Rock Action Records. Some of the formats in which the album was sold included a live performance documentary entitled Burning, recorded at the same live shows.

== Recording ==
The album was recorded at The Music Hall of Williamsburg, Brooklyn, New York over three performances from April 27–29, 2009.

== Formats available ==
The basic format for the album is a CD/Double-LP containing 11 tracks. The album is also available as a limited edition triple vinyl LP box set containing an additional six tracks. For a limited period only, those buying the CD/Double-LP version directly from the Mogwai online store, received a code to use to download the additional six tracks in MP3 format. The extended CD/DVD set also includes the Burning DVD, as does the box set.

== Reception ==
Professional ratings
Aggregate scores
Source	Rating
Metacritic	78/100
Review scores
Source	Rating
Rock Sound	8/10 stars

Reception was generally positive, with particular praise for the Burning video. Noel Gardner of the BBC said the album had "the ability to make you jump out of your skin" whilst Mojo said the album was "a fittingly monolithic monument to (the band's) work to date". Review aggregator website AnyDecentMusic? correlated 11 reviews resulting in an ADM Rating of 7.9. What Hi-Fi? said it was one of the best live albums.

== Personnel and credits ==
=== Mogwai ===
- Dominic Aitchison – bass guitar
- Stuart Braithwaite – guitar
- Martin Bulloch – drums
- Barry Burns – guitar and keyboard
- John Cummings – guitar

=== Production ===
- Live sound engineer: Stephen Wright

== CD/LP Track listing ==
All tracks composed by Mogwai.

1. "I'm Jim Morrison, I'm Dead" – 6:01
2. "Friend of the Night" – 5:30
3. "Hunted By a Freak" – 4:07
4. "Mogwai Fear Satan" – 11:43
5. "Cody" – 6:10
6. "You Don't Know Jesus" – 5:31
7. "I Know You Are But What Am I" – 4:04
8. "I Love You, I'm Going to Blow Up Your School" – 7:57
9. "2 Rights Make 1 Wrong" – 9:05
10. "Like Herod" – 10:38
11. "Glasgow Megasnake" – 3:50
  additional tracks on extended LP version and available through download
12. "Yes! I Am a Long Way from Home" 5:48
13. "Scotland's Shame" 6:30
14. "New Paths to Helicon, Pt. 1" – 8:40
15. "Batcat" – 5:47
16. "Thank You Space Expert" – 7:06
17. "The Precipice" – 7:03

== Burning live DVD track listing ==
1. "The Precipice"
2. "I'm Jim Morrison, I'm Dead"
3. "Hunted By A Freak"
4. "Like Herod"
5. "New Paths to Helicon, Pt. 1"
6. "Mogwai Fear Satan"
7. "Scotland's Shame"
8. "Batcat"
