= Earth Division =

EP by Mogwai
- Released: 12 September 2011
- Studio: Chem19 Studios (Hamilton, Scotland); Castle of Doom Studios (Glasgow, Scotland)
- Genre: Post-rock
- Length: 16:35
- Label: Rock Action; Sub Pop
- Producer: Paul Savage

Mogwai chronology
Hardcore Will Never Die, but You Will (2011)	Earth Division (2011)	A Wrenched Virile Lore (2012)

Earth Division is the tenth EP by Scottish post-rock band Mogwai. It was released on 12 September 2011 through Rock Action Records, and a day later in the US on Sub Pop. The album could not be released for pre-order, as the entire stocks of the CD were destroyed when the distribution centre for PIAS Entertainment Group was destroyed by fire during the 2011 London riots. The four tracks were recorded during the same sessions as those that produced the band's 2011 album Hardcore Will Never Die, But You Will.

== Release and reception ==
According to Pitchfork Media, who gave the EP a score of 6.4/10, this release is one of Mogwai's quieter efforts, describing it as "cold and studied" and suggesting that the band are almost in "soundtrack mode". Writing for thefourohfive.com, Heather Steele agreed, saying that "Earth Division sees them completely lose their trademark urgency and instead take a more uniform sense of silence". Steele however was more positive, giving the EP a score of 8/10 and writing that it is the "most splendid of snapshots to demonstrate just how wide-ranging their music is and just what they are still capable of". Drowned in Sound writer Michael Brown concluded that the four songs are "totally different, yet just as essential as the album from which they were excluded", and said that if Mogwai were to make an acoustic album "it certainly wouldn’t be the worst decision they’ve ever made". Andy Gill, The Independent's music critic, like others commented that the music seemed designed for film or TV work, and gave the EP four out of five stars.

== Track listing ==
12", CD and download
No.	Title	Writer(s)	Length
1.	"Get to France"	John Cummings	2:26
2.	"Hound of Winter"		3:54
3.	"Drunk and Crazy"		5:30
4.	"Does This Always Happen?"		4:45

== Personnel ==
- Stuart Braithwaite – guitar, vocals
- Dominic Aitchison – bass
- Martin Bulloch – drums
- John Cummings – piano, guitar
- Barry Burns – keyboards
- Luke Sutherland – violin, strings
