= Mogwai Fear Satan =

1997 rock instrumental by Mogwai

Instrumental by Mogwai

from the album Mogwai Young Team
- Released: 21 October 1997
- Studio: MCM, Hamilton, Scotland
- Genre: Post-rock; instrumental rock
- Length: 16:19
- Label: Chemikal Underground; Jetset
- Songwriters: Stuart Braithwaite; Dominic Aitchison; Martin Bulloch
- Producer: Paul Savage

Mogwai Young Team track listing
- 10 tracks: 1. "Yes! I Am a Long Way from Home"; 2. "Like Herod"; 3. "Katrien"; 4. "Radar Maker"; 5. "Tracy"; 6. "Summer (Priority Version)"; 7. "With Portfolio"; 8. "R U Still in 2 It"; 9. "A Cheery Wave from Stranded Youngsters"; 10. "Mogwai Fear Satan"

Audio sample
- file; help

"Mogwai Fear Satan" (sometimes referred to as "Fear Satan") is an instrumental by Scottish post-rock group Mogwai. It appears as the closing track for their 1997 debut studio album, Mogwai Young Team.

Pitchfork ranked the song at No. 160 in its list of the Top 200 Tracks of the 1990s.

== Overview ==
"Mogwai Fear Satan" is a 16-minute instrumental, using basic rock instrumentation: guitars, bass, and drums, along with flute. The origin of the song title stems from bassist Dominic Aitchison’s, the only religious member of Mogwai, fear of the Devil, due to his Catholic upbringing.

== Musical composition ==
"Mogwai Fear Satan" begins with a guitar melody riff consisting of three chords by Stuart Braithwaite and John Cummings, which is soon joined by bass played by Dominic Aitchison and a frantic drumbeat played by Martin Bulloch, which gradually fades in. The same guitar riff is repeated throughout the song, at times heavily distorted. During the quiet parts of the song, in the buildup to the explosion of sound and feedback which Mogwai are known for, there is a quiet flute melody played by Shona Brown (who was thirteen at the time of recording) over tribal-sounding drums. The song slowly fades out into feedback and noise.

== Reception ==
Pitchfork named "Mogwai Fear Satan" the 160th-best song of the 1990s, writing that "As opposed to the vein of 'post-rock' exemplified by Stereolab, Laika, Disco Inferno, and others who abandoned traditional rock'n'roll building blocks, this doesn't turn its back on classic or hard at all—at times it sounds like the second half of 'Layla' conducted by Glenn Branca. As with Branca, what hits hardest is the repetition—the way Mogwai remix themselves, playing one ascending figure over and over while piling up the bombast and cascading down into clouds of flute and echo."

== Media usage ==
- In 2002, a short excerpt of "Mogwai Fear Satan" was featured in "Eddie Kidd Rides Again", an episode of the documentary television program, RE:Brand, hosted by English comedian and actor, Russell Brand.
- It was also featured on soundtrack for WRC 4, The Official Game of the FIA World Rally Championship on PlayStation 2.
- Manic Street Preachers used the song as the intro music for their 2005 Past Present Future tour of the UK.
- Repeatedly referred to in Christopher Brookmyre's book Pandaemonium where a 28-minute remix has been created by some of the schoolchildren and played at a school dance.
- Part of the song was used in the 2007 documentary The 11th Hour.
- A remix version of the song is used in the 2003 film All the Real Girls.

== Remixes ==
Mogwai Fear Satan Remixes

There are five official remixes of "Mogwai Fear Satan". The EP Mogwai Fear Satan Remixes (released in March, 1998) includes the Mogwai Remix, the μ-Ziq Remix, the Surgeon Remix, and the My Bloody Valentine Remix. The remix album Kicking a Dead Pig (released in May, 1998) features the Mogwai Remix, LP Version. A later re-issue of Kicking a Dead Pig included Mogwai Fear Satan Remixes on a separate CD.

Both versions of the Mogwai Remix are remixed by "Cpt. Meat and pLasmatroN" (John Cummings and Stuart Braithwaite).

== Personnel ==
- Stuart Braithwaite – guitar
- Dominic Aitchison – bass guitar
- John Cummings – guitar
- Martin Bulloch – drums
- Shona Brown – flute
- Paul Savage – producer, mixer
- Brendan O’Hare – sonic glue, percussion
