= The Hawk Is Howling =

Studio album by Mogwai
- Released: 22 September 2008
- Recorded: Chem19 Studios (Hamilton, Scotland)
- Genres: Post-rock, instrumental rock
- Length: 63:29
- Labels: Wall of Sound; Play It Again Sam; Matador
- Producer: Andy Miller

Mogwai chronology
Mr Beast (2006)	The Hawk Is Howling (2008)	Special Moves (2010)

Singles from The Hawk Is Howling
- 1. "Batcat" Released: 8 September 2008 (EP)

Professional ratings
Aggregate scores
Source	Rating
Metacritic	76/100
Review scores
Source	Rating
AllMusic	4/5 stars
The Guardian	4/5 stars
NME	9/10
Observer Music Monthly	4/5 stars
Pitchfork	4.5/10
PopMatters	7/10 stars
Q	3/5 stars
The Skinny	3/5 stars
Slant	4/5 stars
URB	4.5/5 stars

The Hawk Is Howling is the sixth studio album by the Scottish post-rock band Mogwai, released on 22 September 2008, by Wall of Sound, Play It Again Sam and Matador in the UK, Europe, and the US, respectively. It was released in Australia by Spunk Records on 27 September 2008.

It is their first album of exclusively instrumental songs, since their earlier albums have all had vocals (singing or spoken word) on some tracks.

The album peaked at number 35 in the UK Album Charts and 97 on the Billboard 200.

== Writing and recording ==
The album was recorded and produced by Andy Miller at Chem19 Studios in Hamilton, South Lanarkshire, Scotland and mixed by Gareth Jones at Castle of Doom Studios in Glasgow, Scotland, between September 2007 and March 2008. The album was the first time in ten years that the band had worked with Andy Miller, and at Chem19 Studios, since recording the song "Small Children in the Background" for the No Education = No Future (Fuck the Curfew) EP in May 1998.

Several new compositions were debuted at a show for the Triptych Festival at Tramway in Glasgow in April 2008 — "The Precipice", "I Love You, I'm Going to Blow Up Your School", "I'm Jim Morrison, I'm Dead", "Thank You Space Expert", "Batcat" and "Scotland's Shame".

In 2012 it was awarded a gold certification from the Independent Music Companies Association, which indicated sales of at least 75,000 copies throughout Europe.

== Track listing ==
All tracks composed by Mogwai.

No.	Title	Length
1.	"I'm Jim Morrison, I'm Dead"	6:46
2.	"Batcat"	5:23
3.	"Danphe and the Brain"	5:18
4.	"Local Authority"	4:15
5.	"The Sun Smells Too Loud"	6:58
6.	"Kings Meadow"	4:42
7.	"I Love You, I'm Going to Blow Up Your School"	7:33
8.	"Scotland's Shame"	8:00
9.	"Thank You Space Expert"	7:55
10.	"The Precipice"	6:42
Total length:		63:29

Japanese edition bonus tracks
No.	Title	Length
11.	"Dracula Family"	6:02
12.	"Stupid Prick Gets Chased by the Police and Loses His Slut Girlfriend"	5:07
13.	"Devil Rides"	4:00
Total length:		78:38

The limited-edition version contains the documentary Adelia, I Want To Love: A Film About Mogwai by Vincent Moon and Teresa Eggers, the Dominic Hailstone-directed "Batcat" video and the video "Batcat Animation" created by Fernando Alberto Mena Rojas.

== Personnel ==
Mogwai

- Dominic Aitchison – bass guitar
- Stuart Braithwaite – guitar
- Martin Bulloch – drums
- Barry Burns – guitar, keyboard
- John Cummings – guitar

Additional personnel

- James Aparicio – mixing assistance
- Nadia Bradley – photography and design
- Tony Doogan – recording of "The Sun Smells Too Loud"
- Gareth Jones – mixing
- Andy Miller – producer
- Andi Whitelock – recording of bowed mandolin on "Scotland's Shame"
