= My Father My King =

Single by Mogwai
- Released: 23 October 2001 (UK)
- Recorded: Mayfair Studios (London)
- Genre: Post-rock
- Length: 20:12
- Label: Rock Action; ROCKACTCD10 (UK, CD); ROCKACT10 (UK, 12"); Matador; OLE538-2 (US, CD); Play It Again Sam; PIASV007CD (EU, CD); Spunk Records; URA055 (Aus/NZ, CD); Toy's Factory; TFCK-87273 (Japan, CD)

Mogwai singles chronology
| "New Paths to Helicon, Pt. 1" / "New Paths to Helicon, Pt. 2" (1997) | "My Father My King" (2001) | "Friend of the Night" (2006) |

"My Father My King" is a song by Scottish post-rock band Mogwai, which was released as a single in October 2001. Over 20 minutes long, and billed as a companion piece to the album Rock Action, a sticker on the cover of the single describes it as "two parts serenity and one part death metal". The song is regularly used to end Mogwai concerts – most recently, in 2015, it was the finale of all six of the band's 20th anniversary shows – and was often extended in length.

== Overview and recording ==
The song is based on the melody from Avinu Malkeinu, a Jewish prayer recited on Rosh Hashanah, Yom Kippur, and certain fast days, the melody of which had been taught to the band by producer Arthur Baker. Although the band's song is an instrumental, the hymn's translation ("Inscribe us for blessing in thy book of life") is included in the liner notes to the record. The EP was widely billed as a "companion piece" to previous album Rock Action, although in a 2018 interview Barry Burns said "I don’t really see it like that. It felt quite different to me, quite separate. It felt like we were moving onto something else.".

The song was recorded over three days with Steve Albini at Mayfair Studios, London, in August 2001. Burns recalled, "Arthur Baker heard it first, and it was his idea to record it. We tried to record it twice with him, and we just couldn’t get it together. So we decided to do it with Steve Albini and he really nailed it". Recording was made using tape, with Albini splicing the final cut of the song from two takes using a razor blade.

== Composition ==
The song is based on two separate melodies from Avinu Malkeinu. It begins with a single guitar slowly playing the first melodic phrase, shortly afterwards joined by a second playing a similar counter-melody. A drumbeat enters at 1:30, and a third guitar at 2:15, which plays a counter-melody. The guitars slowly get louder until at 4:00 a harsh distorted guitar starts up, followed by a second at 4:35. The loud guitars start to drown out the other instruments until at 5:45, the noise subsides with one of the distorted guitars picking up the melody. This guitar ceases at 6:18, leaving a single "quiet" guitar, and the bass and drums too cease until there is only a faint trace of the melody on the single guitar.

At around the 8 minute mark, the guitar shifts to the second of the melodies. In a similar manner to the first part of the song, a second guitar joins the first, and eventually the distorted guitars join (at around 10:35) until the melody cannot be heard. The heavy guitars then play a number of different riffs whilst the song slowly becomes louder, until the drums drop out and the melodies cease at around the 17 minute mark. The rest of the song is composed of fragments of guitar noise and feedback which abruptly cuts out at the end.

My Father My King
This sample (3:46 to 4:15 of the song) illustrates the first basic melody line from Avinu Malkeinu, and shows how the melody continues as the first distorted guitar is introduced.

== Reception ==
Mogwai had been playing the song well before it was released, the first known performance being in Brussels in May 1999. A typical live review from 2001 says "The encore 'My Father My King' is simply a plethora of white noise. Simplified and textured guitar riffs turns into controlled feedback and the bass following suit. Soon the control turns to absolute mayhem. Frequencies swirling around the venue hit each member of the audience full on in the chest". It was thus unsurprising that a number of reviews of the single referred to the live shows; Michael Clarke, writing in Drowned in Sound, said that "their live set highlight has been a mysterious, unreleased carnival of noise mainly used as the closing track ... Mogwai literally brought the house down and blew anyone, within distance to hear, away each time they played the instrumental haunting track". Giving the song a score of 10/10, his closing sentence was "20 minutes. No vocals. Sometimes words just can’t describe or do justice to music this good".

Christopher F. Schiel, writing for Pitchfork commented on the band's assertion that the song should be considered alongside the Rock Action album, saying "this demonstration of might and dynamic is exactly what that album lacked" and "unlike Rock Action, this recording doesn't just push the envelope; it shoves". AllMusic commented that the song "retains the experimental, arty flair Mogwai is identified with" and noted the "nicely noisy production job from a man accustomed to such things, Steve Albini". There were dissenting voices, however, notably from PopMatters, who dismissed Albini's recording as sounding "like a glorified soundboard tape. It is utterly lacking in imagination and depth" and summarising the song as "a hackneyed and melodramatic concept piece".

== Track listing ==
The album was released as a CD single, single-sided 12" vinyl, EP and enhanced CD. Some international editions of the single included additional music and video, detailed below.

=== UK and US release ===
This was a CD single and single-sided 12" vinyl release.

1. "My Father My King" – 20:12

=== Australia and New Zealand release ===
This version, on CD and 12" EP, included two live songs recorded at Rothesay Pavilion, Isle of Bute on 14 April 2001.

1. "My Father My King" – 20:12
2. (silence) – 20:00
3. "New Paths to Helicon, Pt. 1" (live) – 7:54
4. "You Don't Know Jesus" (live) – 6:14

=== Japanese release ===
This version, on enhanced CD, further included a video for the song "dial:revenge".

1. "My Father My King" – 20:12
2. "You Don't Know Jesus" (live) – 6:14
3. "New Paths to Helicon, Pt. 1" (live) – 7:54
4. "dial:revenge" (video)

== Credits ==
In addition to Mogwai's usual line-up, regular contributor Luke Sutherland played violin, and Caroline Barber cello.

- Stuart Braithwaite – guitar
- Dominic Aitchison – bass guitar
- Martin Bulloch – drums
- John Cummings – guitar
- Barry Burns – guitar
- Caroline Barber – cello
- Luke Sutherland – violin
- Steve Albini – engineer, mixer
- Arthur Baker – arrangement
