= Hardcore Will Never Die, but You Will =

Studio album by Mogwai
- Released: 14 February 2011
- Studios: Castle of Doom (Glasgow, Scotland); Chem19 (Hamilton, Scotland)
- Genre: Post-rock
- Length: 53:08
- Label: Rock Action
- Producers: Mogwai; Paul Savage

Mogwai chronology
Special Moves (2010)	Hardcore Will Never Die, but You Will (2011)	Earth Division (2011)

Hardcore Will Never Die, but You Will is the seventh studio album by Scottish post-rock band Mogwai, released on 14 February 2011 by Rock Action Records.

Recorded in the band's native Scotland, it was awarded a silver certification from the Independent Music Companies Association (IMPALA) in October 2011, which indicated sales in excess of 20,000 copies throughout Europe.

The album's cover art is a photo of New York City as seen from the Hudson River.

== Background ==
Following the release of their 2008 album The Hawk Is Howling, Mogwai began working on new material for Hardcore Will Never Die, But You Will. The album was recorded in the band's home country of Scotland, with much of the recording process taking place at their studio in Glasgow. The album writing process took place over email because guitarist John Cummings lived in New York while keyboardist Barry Burns lived in Berlin.

The album's title came from a friend of the band, who overheard a ned say it to a shopkeeper who refused to sell him wine because he was too young.

The inspiration for the closing track's title, "You're Lionel Richie", comes from what a hungover Stuart Braithwaite said when he ran into the singer at an airport.

The song title "George Square Thatcher Death Party" inspired an actual gathering at Glasgow's George Square after Thatcher's death in 2013, two years after the album's release. The event was condemned by the Glasgow City Council.

== Critical reception ==
Professional ratings
Aggregate scores
Source	Rating
Metacritic	77/100
Review scores
Source	Rating
AllMusic	4/5 stars
The A.V. Club	B
Drowned in Sound	8/10
NME	8/10
Paste	7.6/10
Pitchfork	6.6/10
PopMatters	6/10
Rolling Stone	3.5/5 stars
Slant Magazine	4/5 stars
Spin	7/10

Hardcore Will Never Die, but You Will received mostly positive reviews from critics. At Metacritic, which assigns a normalised rating out of 100 to reviews from mainstream critics, the album received an average score of 77, based on 34 reviews, which indicates "generally favorable reviews".

== Track listing ==
All tracks are written by Mogwai, except where noted.

No.	Title	Length
1.	"White Noise"	5:04
2.	"Mexican Grand Prix" (writers: Mogwai, Luke Sutherland)	5:18
3.	"Rano Pano"	5:15
4.	"Death Rays"	6:00
5.	"San Pedro"	3:28
6.	"Letters to the Metro"	4:40
7.	"George Square Thatcher Death Party"	4:00
8.	"How to Be a Werewolf"	6:23
9.	"Too Raging to Cheers"	4:30
10.	"You're Lionel Richie"	8:30
Total length:		53:08

Japanese edition bonus tracks
No.	Title	Length
11.	"Slight Domestic"	5:33
12.	"Hasenheide"	3:29
Total length:		62:10

Digibook edition bonus disc
No.	Title	Length
1.	"Music for a Forgotten Future (The Singing Mountain)"	23:09

== Personnel ==
Credits adapted from the liner notes of Hardcore Will Never Die, but You Will.

Mogwai

- Mogwai – production
- Dominic Aitchison – bass guitar
- Stuart Braithwaite – guitar
- Martin Bulloch – drums
- Barry Burns – guitar, keyboards, vocoder (tracks 2, 7)
- John Cummings – guitar

Additional personnel

- Kate Braithwaite – additional voices
- Greg Calbi – mastering
- Antony Crook – photography
- DLT – design
- Andrew Lazonby – additional voices
- Domenico Loiacano – additional voices
- Niall McMenamin – additional recording, mixing assistance
- Paul Savage – mixing, production, recording
- Kim Supajirawatananon – additional voices
- Luke Sutherland – additional guitar (tracks 1, 3); violin (tracks 1, 2, 9); human singing (track 2)

== Charts ==
Chart performance for Hardcore Will Never Die, but You Will
Chart (2011)	Peak position
Australian Albums (ARIA)	78
Austrian Albums (Ö3 Austria)	49
Belgian Albums (Ultratop Flanders)	31
Belgian Albums (Ultratop Wallonia)	39
Dutch Albums (Album Top 100)	83
French Albums (SNEP)	46
German Albums (Offizielle Top 100)	27
Irish Albums (IRMA)	25
Irish Independent Albums (IRMA)	3
Scottish Albums (Official Charts)	12
Swedish Albums (Sverigetopplistan)	57
Swiss Albums (Schweizer Hitparade)	45
UK Albums (Official Charts)	25
UK Independent Albums (Official Charts)	4
US Billboard 200	97
US Independent Albums (Billboard)	14
US Top Alternative Albums (Billboard)	15
US Top Rock Albums (Billboard)	25
