= No Education = No Future (Fuck the Curfew) =

EP by Mogwai
- Released: 29 June 1998
- Recorded: CaVa Studios; Glasgow, Scotland; Chem19 Studios; Hamilton, Scotland
- Genres: Post-rock, instrumental rock
- Length: 21:49
- Label: Chemikal Underground
- Producers: Geoff Allan; Andy Miller

Mogwai chronology
Kicking a Dead Pig (1998)	No Education = No Future (Fuck the Curfew) (1998)	Come On Die Young (1999)

Professional ratings
Review scores
Source	Rating
AllMusic	4/5 stars

No Education = No Future (Fuck the Curfew) is an EP by Scottish post-rock group Mogwai, released in the UK through Chemikal Underground in 1998.

== Overview ==
No Education = No Future (Fuck the Curfew) is Mogwai's second EP. It features three tracks, "Xmas Steps", "Rollerball" (both recorded at CaVa Studios in Glasgow, Scotland and produced by Geoff Allan in April 1998), and "Small Children in the Background" (recorded at Chem19 Studios in Hamilton, Scotland and produced by Andy Miller in May 1998). The curfew mentioned in the title of the EP refers to a curfew which was imposed upon all under-16s in Lanarkshire, Scotland, which made it illegal for them to be out after 9pm. The promo for the EP originally featured the song "Helps Both Ways" (also recorded at CaVa Studios and produced by Geoff Allan), which sampled American football coach John Madden without permission, so consequently, the song was replaced by "Small Children in the Background" on the actual EP. A re-recording of "Helps Both Ways" later appeared on the 1999 album, Come On Die Young. A re-recorded version of "Xmas Steps", entitled "Christmas Steps", also appears on Come On Die Young. All three tracks on the EP later appeared on the 2000 compilation album, EP+6.

== Track listings ==
Songs and music by Mogwai.

- CD CHEM026CD 12" CHEM026
1. "Xmas Steps" – 11:10
2. "Rollerball" – 3:45
3. "Small Children in the Background" – 6:49
- Promo CD PCHEM026CD
1. "Xmas Steps" – 11:10
2. "Rollerball" – 3:45
3. "Helps Both Ways" – 5:19

== Personnel ==
- Stuart Braithwaite – guitar
- Dominic Aitchison – bass guitar
- Martin Bulloch – drums
- John Cummings – guitar
- Luke Sutherland – violin on "Xmas Steps"
- Geoff Allan – producer on "Xmas Steps" and "Rollerball"
- Andy Miller – producer on "Small Children in the Background"

== Release history ==
No Education = No Future (Fuck the Curfew) was released in the United Kingdom in 1998.

Release date	Record label	Catalogue number	Format
April 1998	Chemikal Underground	PCHEM026CD	Promo CD
29 June 1998	Chemikal Underground	CHEM026CD	CD
29 June 1998	Chemikal Underground	CHEM026	12"

== Charts ==
Chart performance for No Education = No Future (Fuck the Curfew)
Chart (1998)	Peak position
UK Singles (Official Charts)	68
UK Indie (Official Charts)	10
