= Like Herod =

Instrumental by Mogwai

from the album Mogwai Young Team
- Released: 21 October 1997
- Studio: MCM Studios, Hamilton, Scotland
- Genre: Post-rock
- Length: 11:39
- Label: Chemikal Underground, Jetset
- Songwriter(s): Stuart Braithwaite; Dominic Aitchison; John Cummings; Martin Bulloch
- Producer(s): Paul Savage

Mogwai Young Team track listing
- 10 Tracks: 1. "Yes! I Am a Long Way from Home"; 2. "Like Herod"; 3. "Katrien"; 4. "Radar Maker"; 5. "Tracy"; 6. "Summer (Priority Version)"; 7. "With Portfolio"; 8. "R U Still in 2 It"; 9. "A Cheery Wave from Stranded Youngsters"; 10. "Mogwai Fear Satan"

Audio sample
- Like Herod: file; help

Government Commissions: BBC Sessions 1996-2003 track listing
- 10 tracks: 1. "Hunted by a Freak"; 2. "R U Still in 2 It"; 3. "New Paths to Helicon Pt II"; 4. "Kappa"; 5. "Cody"; 6. "Like Herod"; 7. "Secret Pint"; 8. "Superheroes of BMX"; 9. "New Paths to Helicon Pt I"; 10. "Stop Coming to My House"

"Like Herod" is a song by Scottish post-rock band Mogwai from their 1997 debut studio album, Mogwai Young Team, written by Stuart Braithwaite, Dominic Aitchison, John Cummings and Martin Bulloch. As well as being a fan-favourite, the song is a live staple, and an extreme display of Mogwai's quiet/loud dynamic contrast method. An 18-minute-long version of "Like Herod" (recorded live by Steve Lamacq from a BBC Radio Session at the BBC Recording and Broadcast Studio in Maida Vale in March 1999) appears on Mogwai's live compilation album, Government Commissions: BBC Sessions 1996-2003. The song was originally titled "Slint", referring to the influential American post-rock band Slint. Stuart Braithwaite has said that "Like Herod" is his favourite song from Mogwai Young Team.

== Musical composition ==
"Like Herod" is an 11-minute 39 second long instrumental in the key of E minor. The song begins with a bassline similar to that of the Manic Street Preachers' song "Ifwhiteamericatoldthetruthforonedayit'sworldwouldfallapart":

This is joined at (0:04) by a guitar, doubling the bassline, and at (0:16) by quiet drumming, and an additional guitar counter-melody. At (0:46), the song progresses into an alternate melody, based around the chord of C major seventh, which is repeated, then the song goes back to repeating the main melody until (1:30), where the alternate melody is repeated once more. The drums then begin to get quieter and quieter, coming to a halt at (2:15), leaving only the guitars and the bass to play the main and alternate melodies themselves, which they do until (2:57), when all the instruments explode in a barrage of deafening noise, featuring a heavy drumbeat and highly distorted, screeching guitars. This continues until (4:51), where the original bassline is introduced once more, and the original drumbeat begins playing. At (5:17), the drumbeat stops abruptly and all that is heard is the bassline, and a guitar, plucking a muted note. This continues, with the plucked note becoming gradually more erratic, until (6:15), when all of the instruments explode into another torrent of noise, almost identical to the last one, albeit with more guitar feedback in the background. This continues until (8:08), when the drumbeat becomes calmer, the guitar feedback becomes more subdued, and the bass can be heard quietly in the background, repeating a heavily distorted note at the start of each bar. At (10:11), the drumbeat ends and all that can be heard is the steady pulse of the ride cymbal, the distorted bass note, and a guitar feedbacking, until (10:20), when it seems to go gradually upwards in pitch, ending at (10:29). Snippets of feedback are heard momentarily as the bass note continues to be played, until (11:05), when the bass note plays one last time, and begins feedbacking, along with subdued guitar noise in the background, until (11:35), when all the instruments cease playing and the song ends.

== Critical reception ==
During professional reviews, "Like Herod" received mostly good reception. The song is an album track pick at Allmusic. Brandon Wu of Ground and Sky notes the "raw power in [the] piece, but unlike the best Mogwai pieces it lacks any sort of melody or beauty." However, Ian Mathers of Stylus Magazine dismisses the song as "good-but-redundant."

== Trivia ==
- The song was also featured in the intro-sequence in the PlayStation version of Actua Ice Hockey 2.

== Personnel ==
- Stuart Braithwaite – guitar
- Dominic Aitchison – bass guitar
- John Cummings – guitar
- Martin Bulloch – drums
- Paul Savage – producer, mixer
