= As the Love Continues =

Studio album by Mogwai
- Released: 19 February 2021
- Recorded: 2020
- Studio: Vada Studios, Alcester, England
- Genre: Post-rock
- Length: 61:23
- Label: Rock Action; Temporary Residence Limited
- Producer: Dave Fridmann

Mogwai chronology
| ZeroZeroZero (2020) | As the Love Continues (2021) | The Bad Fire (2025) |

As the Love Continues is the tenth studio album by Scottish post-rock band Mogwai, released on 19 February 2021 on Rock Action Records in the UK and Europe, and on Temporary Residence Limited in the US. Its UK release date marked the 25th anniversary of Mogwai's first single, "Tuner/Lower". It was preceded by the single "Dry Fantasy", and the streaming of a live concert of the album played in full.

As the Love Continues was met with near universal critical and fan acclaim, including a Mercury Prize nomination in 2021. The album topped the UK Albums Chart in its first week of release, a position that the band called "totally surreal".

== Overview ==
The album is the successor to 2017's Every Country's Sun, and was again produced by Dave Fridmann. Due to the COVID pandemic, it was recorded at Vada Studios in the UK, with Fridmann producing remotely from the United States. It features contributions from Atticus Ross and Kirk Hellie ("Midnight Flit") and Colin Stetson ("Pat Stains"). The lead single, "Dry Fantasy" was released for download on 29 October 2020, and two other tracks ("Ritchie Sacramento" and "Pat Stains") were also shared prior to the album's release. On 13 February, the weekend before the album's release, the band streamed a recording of a live show at Glasgow Tramway where they played the album in full.

The cover art, by David ("DLT") Thomas, features an image of a stuffed white fox, based on a Library of Congress glass negative image taken in Russia in 1910 by Sergey Prokudin-Gorsky. (Note: Information from album liner notes and credits.)

== Recording ==
Mogwai started writing for the album in February 2020 shortly before the COVID-19 pandemic hit the United Kingdom, and due to the resultant lockdown the various band members had to write remotely without playing together; guitarist Stuart Braithwaite commented that "...not being able to leave the settee or go out of the house for more than one hour ... definitely gave us more time to write music. And actually, it was good and gave us the focus to work on." The band were not able to record together until early August 2020, but owing to travel restrictions were unable to proceed with their original plan of recording with Dave Fridmann at his Tarbox Road Studios in New York. The band therefore moved to Vada Studios in Alcester, Warwickshire, with Fridmann producing remotely via Zoom. Braithwaite commented "It's the only time we left Scotland since this whole thing began ... going to England being amazing is not a sentence I thought I'd ever say in my life."

Despite the unusual method of working (Braithwaite: "I wasn't convinced it would work at all. I didn't realise just how involved David could get ... (but) it was just like he was physically in the room with us.") the technology enabled methods of working that would not have been possible otherwise; the string section for "Midnight Flit" was recorded with Atticus Ross in Los Angeles directing an orchestra in Budapest.

== Music ==
The album contains eleven tracks, which consists of mostly instrumental music. Only one track, "Ritchie Sacramento" contains clean vocals, sung by Braithwaite and referencing lost friends including David Berman of Silver Jews and Scott Hutchison of Frightened Rabbit. The songs "Here We, Here We, Here We Go Forever" and "Fuck Off Money" contain vocoder effects by Braithwaite and Barry Burns respectively. "Pat Stains" features saxophone from Colin Stetson, which according to Stereogum "sometimes sounds like needling, off-kilter ghost chatter, and sometimes it sounds like a full orchestra at work".

Typically for the band, the song titles are obtuse, although Braithwaite did share some of the meanings behind them. He said that "Ceiling Granny" was a reference to a scene from The Exorcist III, while "Pat Stains" was a dig at Burns' unsuccessful attempt to remember the name of Foo Fighters guitarist Pat Smear. "To the Bin My Friend, Tonight We Vacate Earth" is named after, and begins with, the phrase spoken in his sleep by Benjamin John Power of the bands Fuck Buttons and Blanck Mass, which was recorded and sent to the band. "Ritchie Sacramento" was named after a friend's mispronunciation of Japanese composer Ryuichi Sakamoto.

== Reception ==
Professional ratings
Aggregate scores
| Source | Rating |
|---|---|
| Metacritic | 83/100 |
Review scores
| Source | Rating |
| AllMusic | 4.5/5 stars |
| Clash | 9/10 |
| Louder Than War | 9/10 |
| Mojo | 4/5 stars |
| musicOMH | 4.5/5 stars |
| NME | 3/5 stars |
| PopMatters | 8/10 |
| Record Collector | 4/5 stars |
| Uncut | 9/10 |
| Pitchfork | 6.9/10 |

As the Love Continues received universal acclaim from music critics. AllMusic described it as "another peak in their long and influential career" whilst Popmatters wrote that the album "testifies that Mogwai are still a truly great band". Record Collector suggested that "Mogwai have resurfaced with their most evolved album in a decade, tethering their formative instincts to forward-thinking ambitions with an instinctive feel for our choppy times", and John Robb, writing for Louder than War, highlighted what he says are "subtle moods, textures and shifts in sound that Mogwai have become the magicians of – a music that creates a film that runs in your head".

Even the more mixed reviews had caveats - the review in NME stated that it "is an album that opens beautifully but falls short at times during its second half. Then again, the whole record works so much better in a live setting – and will continue to do so when Mogwai finally hit the road again." This was a reference to the concert streamed on 13 February, which was also reviewed positively by mainstream publications such as The Guardian and The Spectator; the latter (in a piece entitled "Epic prog rock without the widdly-woo solos") described the songs as "thrillingly turbulent" and "big and epic".

As the Love Continues was nominated for the Mercury Prize in 2021, but lost out to Arlo Parks. On 23 October 2021, the album won the Scottish Album of the Year Award.

== Track listing ==
The album was released on CD and via download with 11 tracks. Deluxe versions are also available, including vinyl editions and a box set, some of which feature a bonus disc (12" vinyl or CD) containing five unreleased demos.

All songs written by Stuart Braithwaite, Dominic Aitchison, and Barry Burns respectively as noted.

| No. | Title | Writer(s) | Length |
|---|---|---|---|
| 1. | "To the Bin My Friend, Tonight We Vacate Earth" | Burns | 5:09 |
| 2. | "Here We, Here We, Here We Go Forever" | Braithwaite | 4:45 |
| 3. | "Dry Fantasy" | Burns | 5:10 |
| 4. | "Ritchie Sacramento" | Braithwaite | 4:12 |
| 5. | "Drive the Nail" | Burns | 7:14 |
| 6. | "Fuck Off Money" | Burns | 5:53 |
| 7. | "Ceiling Granny" | Aitchison | 3:58 |
| 8. | "Midnight Flit" | Burns | 6:08 |
| 9. | "Pat Stains" | Braithwaite | 6:55 |
| 10. | "Supposedly, We Were Nightmares" | Braithwaite | 4:36 |
| 11. | "It's What I Want to Do, Mum" | Braithwaite | 7:23 |
| Total length: | | | 61:23 |

Japanese edition bonus track
| No. | Title | Length |
|---|---|---|
| 12. | "The Scottish Dimension" | 4:18 |
| Total length: | | 65:45 |

=== Bonus disc ===
| No. | Title | Length |
|---|---|---|
| 1. | "To the Bin My Friend, Tonight We Vacate Earth (demo)" | 5:12 |
| 2. | "Here We, Here We, Here We Go Forever (demo)" | 5:32 |
| 3. | "Supposedly, We Were Nightmares (demo)" | 5:04 |
| 4. | "Drive the Nail (demo)" | 6:41 |
| 5. | "It's What I Want to Do, Mum (demo)" | 6:43 |
| Total length: | | 29:12 |

== Credits ==
- Mogwai: Dominic Aitchison, Stuart Braithwaite, Martin Bulloch, Barry Burns
- Songwriting: Burns (Tracks 1,3,5,6,8), Braithwaite (Tracks 2,4,9,10,11), Aitchison (Track 7)
- Produced and mixed by Dave Fridmann
- Recorded and engineered by Tony Doogan
- Artwork by Dave Thomas ("DLT")

== Charts ==
Chart performance for As the Love Continues
| Chart (2021) | Peak position |
|---|---|
| Australian Albums (ARIA) | 71 |
| Belgian Albums (Ultratop Flanders) | 5 |
| Belgian Albums (Ultratop Wallonia) | 17 |
| German Albums (Offizielle Top 100) | 3 |
| Irish Albums (OCC) | 23 |
| Italian Albums (FIMI) | 78 |
| Scottish Albums (OCC) | 1 |
| Swedish Vinyl Albums (Sverigetopplistan) | 6 |
| Swiss Albums (Schweizer Hitparade) | 5 |
| UK Albums (OCC) | 1 |
| UK Independent Albums (OCC) | 1 |
| UK Progressive Albums (OCC) | 1 |
| US Top Album Sales (Billboard) | 9 |
| US Indie Store Album Sales (Billboard) | 16 |
| US Vinyl Albums (Billboard) | 13 |
