= Happy Songs for Happy People =

- Digital cover art. Physical release covers are rendered on a mirrored surface. The remainder of the album title is printed on the reverse side, reading "Happy Songs or Happy People".

Studio album by Mogwai
- Released: 17 June 2003
- Studios: CaVa Studios (Glasgow, Scotland)
- Genres: Post-rock; glitch; instrumental rock
- Length: 41:52
- Labels: Play It Again Sam; Matador
- Producers: Tony Doogan; Mogwai

Mogwai chronology
Rock Action (2001)	Happy Songs for Happy People (2003)	Mr Beast (2006)

Professional ratings
Aggregate scores
Source	Rating
Metacritic	85/100
Review scores
Source	Rating
AllMusic	4/5 stars
Alternative Press	5/5
The Guardian	4/5 stars
Mojo	5/5 stars
NME	8/10
Pitchfork	7.1/10
Q	4/5 stars
Rolling Stone	3/5 stars
The Rolling Stone Album Guide	4/5 stars
Uncut	3/5 stars

Happy Songs for Happy People is the fourth studio album by Scottish post-rock band Mogwai, released on June 17, 2003 on Play It Again Sam and Matador Records. Produced by Tony Doogan and the band itself, the album was recorded at CaVa Studios in Glasgow.

Released to widespread critical acclaim, the album reached number forty-seven on the UK Albums Chart, number twenty-two on the Scottish Albums Chart and number one hundred and eighty-two on the US Billboard 200.

== Overview ==
Happy Songs for Happy People represents a further evolution of Mogwai's toned down, more electronic sound: all songs are based on electric guitars and live drums, but synthesizers are used frequently and often take the main stage on this album, with strings and piano also making the occasional appearance.

Mogwai's usual vocalist Stuart Braithwaite does not sing on this album. Instead, Barry Burns ("Hunted by a Freak", "Killing All the Flies") and John Cummings ("Boring Machines Disturbs Sleep") provide the vocals. According to a 2021 Reddit Ask Me Anything session, the songs don't have actual lyrics, only gibberish.

== Release ==
The CD release of Happy Songs for Happy People contains a demo version of Cubase and the individual tracks for each instrument in "Hunted by a Freak" allowing remixing and reconstructing of the song.

The pre-release MP3s of the album circulating on the net had a sample of Happy Tree Friends cartoon main theme mixed in at the end of the last track.

A computer-animated video was released for the song "Hunted by a Freak", depicting a person throwing pets to their death. The band were asked if the video meant they hated animals, to which Stuart Braithwaite responded: "We love animals. You must be on crack to make such an assumption."

In 2009 it was awarded a gold certification from the Independent Music Companies Association which indicated sales of at least 100,000 copies throughout Europe.

The song "I Know You Are But What Am I?" is used as the closing of Episode 8, Season 1 of the TV show Person of Interest and also appears on The Wicker Man motion picture soundtrack. The song "Kids Will Be Skeletons" was featured in the 2015 video game Life Is Strange as well as episodes of the Netflix series After Life.

== Track listing ==
All tracks are written by Mogwai (Dominic Aitchison, Stuart Braithwaite, Martin Bulloch, Barry Burns and John Cummings).

No.	Title	Length
1.	"Hunted by a Freak"	4:18
2.	"Moses? I Amn't"	2:59
3.	"Kids Will Be Skeletons"	5:29
4.	"Killing All the Flies"	4:35
5.	"Boring Machines Disturbs Sleep"	3:05
6.	"Ratts of the Capital"	8:27
7.	"Golden Porsche"	2:49
8.	"I Know You Are but What Am I?"	5:17
9.	"Stop Coming to My House"	4:53
Total length:		41:52

Japanese edition bonus track
No.	Title	Length
10.	"Sad DC"	4:34
Total length:		46:26

== Personnel ==
Mogwai

- Dominic Aitchison – bass guitar
- Stuart Braithwaite – guitar
- Martin Bulloch – drums
- Barry Burns – guitar, keyboard, vocoder on "Hunted by a Freak" and "Killing All the Flies"
- John Cummings – guitar, piano, vocals on "Boring Machines Disturbs Sleep"

Additional musicians

- Luke Sutherland – violin on "Killing All the Flies" and "Stop Coming to My House", guitar on "Ratts of the Capital"
- Caroline Barber – cello on "Hunted By a Freak", "Moses? I Amn't" and "Golden Porsche"
- Donald Gillian – cello on "Killing All the Flies"
- Scott Dickinson – viola on "Killing All the Flies"
- Greg Lawson – violin on "Killing All the Flies"

Production

- Tony Doogan – production, recording, mixing
- Mogwai – production
- Michael "Frango" Bannister – assistant engineering
- Gavin Lawrie – assistant engineering
- Adam Nunn – mastering

Artwork and design

- Uncontrollable Urge – cover
- Divine Inc – design

== Charts ==
Chart (2003)	Peak position
French Albums (SNEP)	91
Scottish Albums (Official Charts)	22
UK Albums (Official Charts)	47
UK Independent Albums (Official Charts)	6
US Billboard 200	182
US Heatseekers Albums (Billboard)	9
US Independent Albums (Billboard)	13
