= Kin (Mogwai album) =

Soundtrack album by Mogwai
- Released: 31 August 2018
- Genre: Post-rock
- Length: 41:52

Mogwai chronology
Every Country's Sun (2017)	Kin (2018)	ZeroZeroZero (2020)

Singles from Kin
- 1. "Donuts" Released: 27 April 2018; 2. "We’re Not Done (End Title)" Released: 21 June 2018

Kin is an original soundtrack album by Scottish post-rock band Mogwai, released on 31 August 2018 on Rock Action Records in the UK and Europe, and Temporary Residence Limited in the United States. Two tracks "Donuts" and "We're Not Done (End Title)" were released ahead of the album.

The music was composed for Kin, the 2018 American science fiction action film directed by Jonathan and Josh Baker and written by Daniel Casey. Mogwai have previously scored documentaries, but this is their first full film soundtrack. Guitarist Stuart Braithwaite said "It was amazing to do a project that was so different to anything we’ve done before and see how our music fits in a totally different environment to how it’s been used before."

== Track listing ==
All tracks are written by Mogwai.

No.	Title	Length
1.	"Eli's Theme"	3:23
2.	"Scrap"	2:51
3.	"Flee"	4:57
4.	"Funeral Pyre"	3:19
5.	"Donuts"	6:24
6.	"Miscreants"	3:06
7.	"Guns Down"	6:19
8.	"Kin"	7:18
9.	"We're Not Done (End Title)"	4:15
Total length:		41:52

== Personnel ==
Mogwai

- Stuart Braithwaite – guitar, vocals, performer
- Dominic Aitchison – bass guitar, performer
- Barry Burns – guitar, piano, synthesizer, performer
- Martin Bulloch - Drums, performer
- Chris Mollere - music supervisor
- Kevin Banks - music editor
- Richard Henderson - music editor

== Charts ==
Chart (2018)	Peak position
Belgian Albums (Ultratop Flanders)	88
Scottish Albums (Official Charts)	7
UK Albums (Official Charts)	44
