= Rock Action (album) =

Studio album by Mogwai
- Released: 30 April 2001
- Studio: Tarbox Road Studios (Cassadaga, New York); Sorcerer Sound Studios (New York, New York); CaVa Studios (Glasgow, Scotland)
- Genre: Post-rock; slowcore; glitch
- Length: 38:28
- Label: Matador
- Producer: Dave Fridmann

Mogwai chronology
| Come On Die Young (1999) | Rock Action (2001) | Happy Songs for Happy People (2003) |

Professional ratings
Aggregate scores
| Source | Rating |
|---|---|
| Metacritic | 76/100 |
Review scores
| Source | Rating |
| AllMusic | 3.5/5 stars |
| Alternative Press | 4/5 |
| Blender | 2/5 stars |
| The Boston Phoenix | 3/4 stars |
| The Guardian | 4/5 stars |
| NME | 8/10 |
| Pitchfork | 8.0/10 |
| Q | 4/5 stars |
| The Rolling Stone Album Guide | 4/5 stars |
| Spin | 8/10 |

Rock Action is the third studio album by the Scottish post-rock band Mogwai, released on 30 April 2001 on Matador Records. The album was produced by Dave Fridmann, of the band Mercury Rev, in New York.

Released to critical acclaim, the album reached number twenty-three on the UK Albums Chart and number twenty on the Scottish Albums Chart. The band would later reuse the album's title in naming their own record label, Rock Action Records.

== Overview ==
Rock Action brought with it some changes to Mogwai's sound that they would continue to develop later, including the use of electronic instruments. While song structures on this album are typical of the band in most cases and respects, some of the contrasting dynamics have been toned down slightly and many of the songs focus more on texture than on structure. For the first time, Mogwai utilised synthesizers, expanding their timbral palette. The tone of Rock Action is somewhat less dark than previous works, but maintains Mogwai's cryptic cynicism.

The single "Dial: Revenge" features Welsh vocals from Gruff Rhys of Super Furry Animals. Rhys has said of the song title: "I think (Mogwai) were into me writing in Welsh, because they're an instrumental band and they wanted a singer who would be just sounds for most people. Back then, people were still using payphones. When you take a payphone off the hook, on the LCD screen it flashes 'DIAL'. But in Welsh, dial – pronounced 'dee-al' – means revenge. It puts you in a weird place when you're making a phone call. So the song was about that." The song "2 Rights Make 1 Wrong" was originally titled "Banjo".

== Artwork ==
The photographs that make up the artwork for the album were taken in a bar in Glasgow called Nice 'n' Sleazy. When the inside cover is unfolded, part of the logo for Mwng, an album by Super Furry Animals released the previous year, can be seen.

== Certifications ==
In 2009, Rock Action was awarded a gold certification from the Independent Music Companies Association, which indicated sales of at least 100,000 copies throughout Europe.

== Track listing ==
All tracks are written by Mogwai (Dominic Aitchison, Stuart Braithwaite, Martin Bulloch, Barry Burns and John Cummings), except where noted.

| No. | Title | Writer(s) | Length |
|---|---|---|---|
| 1. | "Sine Wave" | | 4:55 |
| 2. | "Take Me Somewhere Nice" | | 6:57 |
| 3. | "O I Sleep" | | 0:55 |
| 4. | "Dial: Revenge" | Mogwai; Gruff Rhys | 3:28 |
| 5. | "You Don't Know Jesus" | | 8:02 |
| 6. | "Robot Chant" | | 1:03 |
| 7. | "2 Rights Make 1 Wrong" | | 9:31 |
| 8. | "Secret Pint" | | 3:37 |
| Total length: | | | 38:28 |

Japanese edition bonus tracks
| No. | Title | Length |
|---|---|---|
| 9. | "Untitled" | 7:16 |
| 10. | "Close Encounters" | 3:54 |
| Total length: | | 49:38 |

== Personnel ==
Mogwai

- Dominic Aitchison – bass
- Stuart Braithwaite – guitar, vocals
- Martin Bulloch – drums
- Barry Burns – guitar, keyboard, vocoder
- John Cummings – guitar, piano

Additional musicians

- David Pajo – backing vocals on "Take Me Somewhere Nice"
- Gruff Rhys – vocals on "Dial: Revenge", backing vocals on "2 Rights Make 1 Wrong"
- The Remote Viewer – programming and banjo on "2 Rights Make 1 Wrong"
- Willie Campbell – backing vocals on "2 Rights Make 1 Wrong"
- Charlie Clark – backing vocals on "2 Rights Make 1 Wrong"
- Gary Lightbody – backing vocals on "2 Rights Make 1 Wrong"
- Michael Brawley – strings and horns on "Take Me Somewhere Nice" and "2 Rights Make 1 Wrong"
- Dave Fridmann – strings and horns on "Dial: Revenge" and "Secret Pint"

Production

- Dave Fridmann – production, mixing, recording
- Tony Doogan – recording
- Willie Deans – engineering (assistant, at CaVa Studios)
- Bill Racine – engineering (assistant, at Sorcerer Sound Studios)
- Vella Design – design, art
- Steve Gullick – photography

== Charts ==
| Chart (2001) | Peak position |
|---|---|
| French Albums (SNEP) | 82 |
| Scottish Albums (OCC) | 20 |
| UK Albums (OCC) | 23 |
| UK Independent Albums (OCC) | 4 |
| US Heatseekers Albums (Billboard) | 20 |
| US Independent Albums (Billboard) | 16 |
