= ZeroZeroZero (album) =

Soundtrack album by Mogwai
- Released: 1 May 2020
- Recorded: 2019
- Length: 68:43
- Label: Rock Action
- Producer: Tony Doogan

Mogwai chronology
Kin (2018)	ZeroZeroZero (2020)	2018 (2020)

ZeroZeroZero is an original soundtrack album by Scottish post-rock band Mogwai, released on 1 May 2020 on Rock Action Records. Due to the COVID-19 pandemic, it was released initially in a download only format via Bandcamp, and for the first week on a pay-what-you-want basis. 50% of the first week's income for the record is to be donated to charities including Help Musicians and various NHS charities.

The music was composed for ZeroZeroZero, an Italian crime drama television series based on the book of the same name by Roberto Saviano.

== Track listing ==
All tracks are written by Mogwai.

No.	Title	Length
1.	"Visit Me"	2:40
2.	"I'm Not Going When I Don't Get Back"	2:27
3.	"Telt"	1:54
4.	"Chicken Guns"	4:48
5.	"Nose Pints"	2:04
6.	"Fears of Metal"	2:37
7.	"Space Annual"	1:21
8.	"Invisible Frequencies"	2:53
9.	"Moon in Reverse"	4:01
10.	"Don't Make Me Go Out on My Own"	3:15
11.	"Lesser Glasgow"	4:18
12.	"Frog Marching"	4:03
13.	"El Dante"	3:48
14.	"Major Treat"	2:15
15.	"Rivers Wanted"	4:11
16.	"Summon the Sacred Beast"	3:22
17.	"Modern Trolls"	3:51
18.	"The Winter's Not Forever"	3:47
19.	"He Loved Trees"	2:18
20.	"Witches of Alignment"	3:57
21.	"The Wife Was Touched"	4:53
Total length:		68:43

== Personnel ==
Mogwai

- Stuart Braithwaite – guitar, vocals
- Dominic Aitchison – bass guitar
- Barry Burns – guitar, piano, synthesizer
- Martin Bulloch - drums

== Charts ==
Chart performance of ZeroZeroZero
Chart (2020–2021)	Peak position
Australian Albums (ARIA)	60
Scottish Albums (Official Charts)	97
