= If the Stars Had a Sound =

2024 biographical film about Mogwai

- Theatrical release poster
- Directed by: Antony Crook
- Produced by: Kyrie Barker (credited as Kyrie McTavish)
- Edited by: Antony Crook, David Arthur
- Music by: Mogwai
- Production company: Blazing Griffin
- Distributed by: Lightbulb Film (UK & Ireland): Greenwich Entertainment (US)
- Release dates: 19 November 2024 (United Kingdom); 1 May 2025 (United States)
- Running time: 91 minutes
- Country: United Kingdom
- Language: English

If the Stars Had a Sound is a 2024 documentary film that focuses on the career of Scottish rock band Mogwai, and was directed by Antony Crook. After showings at SXSW in March 2024, and at various film festivals, it was released in UK and Ireland cinemas for a one-night showing on 19 November 2024, and will be released theatrically in the US to coincide with the band's tour there in 2025. The film was nominated for "Best Documentary Feature" at the 2024 Raindance Film Festival. The title of the film is taken from part of a spoken sample that opens "Yes! I Am a Long Way from Home", the first track on the band's debut album.

== Narrative ==
The film opens with footage filmed in the week of the release of the band's album As the Love Continues in 2021, and also shows the recording of the album with producer Dave Fridmann acting remotely from the US during the COVID pandemic. It then moves back to the 1990s, showing archive footage of the band playing, and numerous interviews with notable people (Fridmann, Alex Kapranos, Ian Rankin, Arthur Baker) talking about their evolution and influence. Baker recalls showing the band the Jewish hymn Avinu Malkeinu and suggesting they could use it, leading to the recording of "My Father My King" together with extended concert footage of the song. The film eventually switches back to 2021, and As the Love Continues reaching No.1 in the UK album charts, together with footage of the band receiving plaudits and appearing at the Mercury Music Prize awards. The last part of the film is given to numerous fans, both famous and regular, talking about what the band's music means to them.

== Reception ==
Reception to the film was generally positive. The Independent said "It's not just a love letter to the fans and the band's long-enduring success, it's a love letter to every underground artist out there." whilst Jenny Nulf in the Austin Chronicle said "there's absolutely no vanity in the film ... instead, it focuses on the connections made through their music." Phil Hoad in the Guardian remarked "while this film is sketchy on the details, it truly soars when capturing [the band] live". Rachel Kent from The Reviews Hub, whilst saying that "Devoted fans will enjoy every fuzzy faded moment, and delight in the generous portions of music" also said that "as a documentary, however, the film falls short in many ways."

== Home release ==
The film was released on 28 April 2025, as a standard DVD and also a "collector's edition" double disc Blu-ray which includes bonus material; the film trailer, an interview with the band and the whole of the band's show at Glasgow Tramway arts centre in 2021, during which they played the whole of their album As the Love Continues.
