= Christmas Steps (composition) =

Song by Mogwai

"Xmas Steps"

Instrumental by Mogwai

from the album No Education = No Future (Fuck the Curfew)
- Released: 29 June 1998
- Recorded: CaVa Studios; Glasgow, Scotland
- Length: 11:10
- Label: Chemikal Underground, Jetset
- Songwriters: Stuart Braithwaite, Dominic Aitchison
- Producer: Geoff Allan

"Christmas Steps"

Instrumental by Mogwai

from the album Come on Die Young
- Released: 29 March 1999
- Recorded: Tarbox Road Studios; Cassadaga, New York, United States; CaVa Studios; Glasgow, Scotland
- Genre: Post-rock, instrumental rock
- Length: 10:36
- Label: Chemikal Underground, Matador
- Songwriters: Stuart Braithwaite, Dominic Aitchison
- Producer: Dave Fridmann

"Xmas Steps" or "Christmas Steps" is a song by Scottish post-rock group Mogwai. The original version of the song ("Xmas Steps") is the lead track from the 1998 EP No Education = No Future (Fuck the Curfew), and a slightly different version ("Christmas Steps") appears on the 1999 album Come On Die Young.

== Overview ==
"Xmas Steps" is an eleven-minute-long instrumental, in the key of C♯ minor. "Christmas Steps" is a rerecorded version which retains the basic structure and composition, but is shorter in length, performed significantly slower and features clearer dynamic contrast and better production value. The song is named after Christmas Steps, a street in Bristol, South West England. The song was featured on the 1999 compilation album, Everything Is Nice: The Matador Records 10th Anniversary Anthology, incorrectly labelled as "Xmas Steps".

== Musical composition ("Xmas Steps") ==
"Xmas Steps" begins with the same guitar melody as "Christmas Steps". This is repeated until (0:30), when a second guitar begins doubling the melody, with slight variations. At (0:45), the Hi-hat begins quietly keeping time, and the melody is repeated until (1:31), where it is joined quietly by a bass guitar, playing a counter-melody. At (1:46), both the guitars begin playing a counter-melody, until (2:01), where one guitar plays an independent counter-melody, which is repeated until (2:44), where both guitars begin to steadily strum chords. At (3:20), the Hi-hat stops keeping time, leading the guitars into a gradual crescendo, joined at (3:27) by the bass, which plays the same chords as the guitars, with a different rhythm. The guitars increase steadily in volume and tempo, until (4:20), where the drums enter and the guitars begin playing a chord structure based around the chords of C♯ minor, C♯ suspended 2nd, and A major. At (4:52), the guitars suddenly turn distorted, repeating the chord structure, until (5:21), when a distorted guitar solo is played. At (5:46), the guitars repeat a C♯ minor chord, until (5:55), when the guitars turn clean and begin repeating the chord structure. At (6:11), a violin solo begins to play and the guitars begin playing a counter-melody. This is repeated until (7:54), when the drums cease playing, the guitars repeat the counter-melody and the violin solo continues improvising. At (10:06), the sound of the tape being wound back by hand is heard. The violin ceases playing at (10:42), followed soon by the guitars, which end on a C♯, which fades out.

== Musical composition ("Christmas Steps") ==
"Christmas Steps" begins with a guitar melody based around the chords of C♯ minor and A major:

This is repeated until (0:36) when a second guitar begins to double the melody, with slight variations. At (1:12), one of the guitars begins to play a counter-melody, and at (1:28), the bass guitar also begins a counter-melody. At (1:47), both guitars begin playing the first counter-melody. At (2:04), one of the guitars begins playing another counter-melody, until (2:57), when the guitars begin doubling themselves again. At (3:14), the bass guitar ceases playing and the guitar strumming becomes more predominant, until (3:47), when the bass guitar suddenly begins playing a loud, slightly distorted counter-melody. The instruments build up in a gradual crescendo, increasing in volume and tempo, until (4:39), when the drums enter and the guitars strum a chord structure based around the chords of C♯ minor, C♯ suspended 2nd, and A major. At (5:14), the guitars suddenly turn distorted, repeating the chord structure until (5:43), where one of the guitars plays a solo. At (6:10), the guitars strum a C♯ minor chord until (6:18), where the guitars turn clean and the chord structure is reintroduced. At (6:29), a violin solo begins playing quietly in the background; the reason for the quietness being the song using the same solo as recorded by Luke Sutherland for "Xmas Steps", which was played significantly faster. At (6:34), the guitars begin the last counter-melody of the song, doubling each other with noticeable variations. The drums cease playing at (7:10), leaving the guitars playing their melodies, and gradually slowing down in a diminuendo with the violin solo playing faintly in the background, until (10:28), when the guitars cease playing, ending on a C♯, which fades out.

== Music video ==
A video for the song was filmed by English filmmaker Brian Griffin and released in 1998. The video is set in the Age of Steam, and was shot on location in the Chiltern Hills and at the Great Western Preservation Society in Didcot.

== Media usage ==
- In 2007, "Christmas Steps" was featured in the documentary film White Light/Black Rain: The Destruction of Hiroshima and Nagasaki.
- The song is occasionally used as background music on This American Life.

== Personnel ==
- Stuart Braithwaite – guitar
- Dominic Aitchison – bass guitar
- John Cummings – guitar
- Martin Bulloch – drums
- Luke Sutherland – violin
- Dave Fridmann – producer, mixer, engineer
