= Come On Die Young =

Studio album by Mogwai
- Released: 29 March 1999
- Studios: Tarbox Road (Cassadaga, New York); CaVa (Glasgow, Scotland)
- Genres: Post-rock; noise rock; space rock; indie rock
- Length: 67:32
- Labels: Chemikal Underground; Matador
- Producer: Dave Fridmann

Mogwai chronology
Mogwai Young Team (1997)	Come On Die Young (1999)	EP (1999)

Come On Die Young is the second studio album by Scottish post-rock band Mogwai. The album was released on 29 March 1999 by Chemikal Underground.

== Overview ==
Songs for Come On Die Young were written by the band members at home or together in the rehearsal room. Wanting a sparser sound, Mogwai drew influences from Seventeen Seconds by The Cure and Spiderland by Slint as well as Low, Nick Drake and The For Carnation. The songs "Christmas Steps" and "Ex-Cowboy" had been played live by the band during the tour for Mogwai Young Team.

The album was recorded in three weeks at Tarbox Road Studios in Cassadaga, New York with producer Dave Fridmann and was the first Mogwai recording to feature multi-instrumentalist Barry Burns. The original intended running time of the album was extended after Mogwai's record label, Chemikal Underground, persuaded them to include more of the songs they had recorded. Come On Die Young is somewhat different from the rest of Mogwai's work because of its reserved tone. The album's second track "Cody" is much more like a traditional pop song than most of the band's repertoire. Still slow and sinuous, it features an uncharacteristically distinct melody, slide guitar and relatively prominent vocals. Much of Come On Die Young consists of slow, quiet, drum-driven tracks containing tense, feedback-laden crescendos and occasionally ambient textures. Near the end of the album, the bombastic "Christmas Steps" breaks away from this quiet tension and displays a return to Mogwai's more well-known distortion-heavy dynamics.

The album's title derives from a Glasgow gang of the same name.

== Song information ==
- "Punk Rock:" samples a speech made by Iggy Pop during an interview with Peter Gzowski on the CBC, broadcast on 11 March 1977.
- The album cover, which features the face of Dominic Aitchison, was inspired by Captain Howdy from The Exorcist.
- The song "Cody" featured in the second episode of the first series of teen drama Skins.
- The post-black metal band Deafheaven covered "Punk Rock" and "Cody" for the 2012 split EP Deafheaven / Bosse-de-Nage.
- The original version of the song "Helps Both Ways", commonly referred to as the "Madden version", featured John Madden's commentary on the first quarter of the American football National Football Conference championship game between the San Francisco 49ers and the Green Bay Packers, played on January 11, 1998, at 1 pm PST at San Francisco's Candlestick Park. As its use was unauthorized, the commentary track was replaced by another American football commentary track.

== Critical reception ==
Professional ratings
Review scores
Source	Rating
AllMusic	2.5/5 stars
The Guardian	4/5 stars
The Independent	4/5 stars
Melody Maker	2.5/5 stars
NME	8/10
Pitchfork	8.3/10
Q	4/5 stars
Rolling Stone	3.5/5 stars
Spin	7/10
The Village Voice	C

Come On Die Young received a somewhat muted reception when compared to Mogwai Young Team. Stephen Thomas Erlewine, writing for AllMusic, wrote that "perhaps Come On Die Young wouldn't have seemed as disappointing if it hadn't arrived on the wave of hype and expectation, but the truth is, it pales in comparison to their own work."

== Track listing ==
No.	Title	Writer(s)	Length
1.	"Punk Rock:"	Stuart Braithwaite	2:09
2.	"Cody"	Braithwaite	6:33
3.	"Helps Both Ways"	Dominic Aitchison	4:53
4.	"Year 2000 Non-Compliant Cardia"	Braithwaite; Martin Bulloch	3:26
5.	"Kappa"	Aitchison; Braithwaite	4:53
6.	"Waltz for Aidan"	Aitchison; Braithwaite	3:44
7.	"May Nothing But Happiness Come Through Your Door"	Aitchison; Braithwaite; Barry Burns	8:30
8.	"Oh! How the Dogs Stack Up"	Burns	2:04
9.	"Ex-Cowboy"	Aitchison	9:09
10.	"Chocky"	Bulloch; Burns; John Cummings	9:23
11.	"Christmas Steps"	Aitchison; Braithwaite	10:39
12.	"Punk Rock/Puff Daddy/ANʇICHRISʇ"	Braithwaite	2:14
Total length:			67:38

2014 re-release bonus tracks (Vinyl LP + CD releases)
No.	Title	Length
1.	"Nick Drake"	3:14
2.	"Waltz for Aidan" (Chem19 Demo)	3:40
3.	"Christmas Steps" (Chem19 Demo; available on vinyl LP version only)	6:41
4.	"Rollerball" (Chem19 Demo)	3:51
5.	"7:25" (Chem19 Demo; available on vinyl LP version only)	6:37
6.	"Untitled" (Travels in Constants, Vol. 12 EP)	6:07
7.	"Quiet Stereo Dee" (Travels in Constants, Vol. 12 EP)	4:07
8.	"Arundel" (Travels in Constants, Vol. 12 EP)	2:59
9.	"Cody" (CaVa Sessions)	5:58
10.	"Ex-Cowboy" (CaVa Sessions)	9:12
11.	"Spoon Test" (CaVa Sessions)	6:29
12.	"Punk Rock:" (CaVa Sessions)	2:12
13.	"Helicon 2" (CaVa Church Live)	3:05
14.	"Satchel Panzer" (CaVa Church Live)	1:24
15.	"Kappa" (CaVa Church Live)	4:38
16.	"Helps Both Ways" (Original Version)	5:22
17.	"Hugh Dallas"	8:31

== Personnel ==
Mogwai

- Stuart Braithwaite – guitar, vocals on "Cody"
- Dominic Aitchison – bass guitar
- Martin Bulloch – drums
- John Cummings – guitar
- Barry Burns – piano, keyboard, guitar, flute

Additional musicians

- Richard Formby – lap steel guitar on "Cody"
- Luke Sutherland – violin
- Wayne Myers – trombone on "Punk Rock/Puff Daddy/ANʇICHRISʇ"
- Dave Fridmann – various instruments

Production

- Dave Fridmann – production

== Charts ==
Chart (1999)	Peak position
Scottish Albums (Official Charts)	24
UK Albums (Official Charts)	29
UK Independent Albums (Official Charts)	6
