= Government Commissions: BBC Sessions 1996–2003 =

Compilation album by Mogwai
- Released: 21 February 2005
- Recorded: Maida Vale, Hippodrome
- Genre: Post-rock
- Length: 67:00
- Labels: PIAS, Rock Action

Mogwai chronology
Happy Songs for Happy People (2003)	Government Commissions: BBC Sessions 1996–2003 (2005)	Mr Beast (2006)

Professional ratings
Aggregate scores
Source	Rating
Metacritic	79/100
Review scores
Source	Rating
Allmusic	4/5 stars
Pitchfork Media	(8.0/10)

Government Commissions: BBC Sessions 1996–2003 is a compilation album by the post-rock group Mogwai released in 2005, consisting of sessions recorded between 1996 and 2003 for BBC Radio. Some of the tracks are different from previously released versions – for example, the recording of "R U Still in 2 It?" is entirely instrumental, whereas the studio version on Mogwai Young Team features a lead vocal from Arab Strap member Aidan Moffat. Following the death of BBC Radio 1 DJ John Peel in 2004, for whose show many of the tracks were recorded, Mogwai decided to dedicate the album to him. Peel's voice announces "Ladies and Gentlemen, Mogwai!" at the beginning of "Hunted by a Freak", the album's opener.

In 2012 it was awarded a double silver certification from the Independent Music Companies Association, which indicated sales of at least 40,000 copies throughout Europe.

== Track listing ==
=== CD ===
All tracks are written by Mogwai.

No.	Title	Length
1.	"Hunted by a Freak"	4:09
2.	"R U Still in 2 It"	6:18
3.	"New Paths to Helicon Pt II"	2:51
4.	"Kappa"	4:23
5.	"Cody"	6:07
6.	"Like Herod"	18:32
7.	"Secret Pint"	4:32
8.	"Superheroes of BMX"	7:29
9.	"New Paths to Helicon Pt I"	8:11
10.	"Stop Coming to My House"	4:40

=== 2xLP ===
All tracks are written by Mogwai.

Side one
No.	Title	Length
1.	"Hunted by a Freak"	4:09
2.	"R U Still in 2 It"	6:18
3.	"New Paths to Helicon Pt II"	2:51

Side two
No.	Title	Length
4.	"Kappa"	4:23
5.	"Cody"	6:07
6.	"Superheroes of BMX"	7:29

Side three
No.	Title	Length
7.	"Like Herod"	18:32

Side four
No.	Title	Length
8.	"Secret Pint"	4:32
9.	"New Paths to Helicon Pt I"	8:11
10.	"Stop Coming to My House"	4:40

== Personnel ==
- Mike Engles, Mike Robinson, Miti Adhikari, and Simon Askew - Recording and Mixing
- Nick Fountain, Colin Beaumont, Nick King, Kevin Rumble, Jamie Hart - Assistant Engineer
- Mark Maxwell - Photo of John Peel
