= Every Country's Sun =

Studio album by Mogwai
- Released: 1 September 2017
- Recorded: 2016–2017
- Studios: Tarbox Road, Cassadaga, New York
- Length: 56:07
- Label: Rock Action
- Producer: Dave Fridmann

Mogwai chronology
Before the Flood (2016)	Every Country's Sun (2017)	Kin (2018)

Singles from Every Country's Sun
- 1. "Coolverine" Released: 14 May 2017; 2. "Party in the Dark" Released: 25 August 2017

Professional ratings
Aggregate scores
Source	Rating
AnyDecentMusic?	7.6/10
Metacritic	79/100
Review scores
Source	Rating
AllMusic	3.5/5 stars
The A.V. Club	B+
Exclaim!	8/10
The Guardian	4/5 stars
The Independent	3/5 stars
Mojo	4/5 stars
Pitchfork	7.6/10
Q	3/5 stars
Record Collector	4/5 stars
Uncut	8/10

Every Country's Sun is the ninth studio album by Scottish post-rock band Mogwai, released on 1 September 2017 on Rock Action Records in the United Kingdom and Europe, Temporary Residence Limited in the United States, and Spunk Records in Australia. Produced by Dave Fridmann, who had previously worked with the band on their second and third studio albums, Come On Die Young (1999) and Rock Action (2001), the album was preceded by the singles, "Coolverine" and "Party in the Dark".

It was the band's first studio album without founding guitarist John Cummings, who left the band in 2015. Released to critical acclaim, the album reached number six on the UK Albums Chart and number two on the Scottish Albums Chart.

== Overview ==
In April 2016, guitarist Stuart Braithwaite told The Guardian that the band were writing new songs and would be travelling to the US later in the year to record a new album with Dave Fridmann, who produced Rock Action some 15 years previously. On 25 November, Fridmann announced that the band had started recording the album with him. On 3 March 2017, the band announced that they had completed recording and were mastering the album at Abbey Road Studios. The band announced a worldwide tour to coincide with the release of the album, starting with dates in Europe in October before visiting North America in November, and finally playing in their home city, Glasgow, in December 2017.

On 14 May 2017, the band announced the title and release date of the new album, and also shared the first song "Coolverine". On June 2, Mogwai played a show at Primavera Sound festival in Barcelona, only announced on the day, which consisted of Every Country's Sun played in full.

== Track listing ==
The deluxe version contains the album on CD and LP, along with a bonus 12-inch vinyl containing six previously unreleased demos.

All tracks are written by Mogwai.

No.	Title	Length
1.	"Coolverine"	6:17
2.	"Party in the Dark"	4:02
3.	"Brain Sweeties"	4:44
4.	"Crossing the Road Material"	6:58
5.	"aka 47"	4:16
6.	"20 Size"	4:44
7.	"1000 Foot Face"	4:31
8.	"Don't Believe the Fife"	6:24
9.	"Battered at a Scramble"	4:03
10.	"Old Poisons"	4:30
11.	"Every Country's Sun"	5:38
Total length:		56:07

Bonus track for Japanese release
No.	Title	Length
12.	"Fight for Work"	6:49

Deluxe edition bonus tracks
No.	Title	Length
12.	"Acoustic Wash" (20 Size demo)	4:21
13.	"Baritone 2" (Don’t Believe The Fife demo)	6:12
14.	"Bass Tuned to C" (1000 Foot Face demo)	4:53
15.	"Bends" (Battered At A Scramble demo)	4:19
16.	"Frez" (Old Poisons demo)	4:36
17.	"Ludicrous Ripper" (Every Country’s Sun demo)	5:35

== Personnel ==
Credits adapted from the liner notes of Every Country's Sun.

- Frank Arkwright – mastering
- DLT – design, illustration
- Matt Estep – mixing assistance, production assistance
- Dave Fridmann – mixing, production

== Charts ==
Chart (2017)	Peak position
Australian Albums (ARIA)	65
Austrian Albums (Ö3 Austria)	52
Belgian Albums (Ultratop Flanders)	21
Belgian Albums (Ultratop Wallonia)	19
Dutch Albums (Album Top 100)	85
French Albums (SNEP)	50
German Albums (Offizielle Top 100)	29
Greek Albums (IFPI)	29
Irish Albums (IRMA)	45
Irish Independent Albums (IRMA)	5
New Zealand Heatseekers Albums (RMNZ)	9
Scottish Albums (Official Charts)	2
Spanish Albums (Promusicae)	41
Swiss Albums (Schweizer Hitparade)	28
UK Albums (Official Charts)	6
UK Independent Albums (Official Charts)	3
US Independent Albums (Billboard)	17
