= Yes! I Am a Long Way from Home =

Song by Mogwai

from the album Mogwai Young Team
- Released: 21 October 1997
- Recorded: MCM Studios; Hamilton, Scotland
- Genre: Post-rock
- Length: 5:58
- Label: Chemikal Underground
- Composer: Dominic Aitchison
- Producers: Paul Savage, Mogwai

"Yes! I Am a Long Way from Home" is the opening track on the Scottish post-rock band Mogwai's 1997 debut album, Mogwai Young Team. It was primarily composed by the band's bassist, Dominic Aitchison, prior to the 1997 Mogwai Young Team recording sessions.

The song features electric guitar, bass guitar, drum kit, organ, and glockenspiel, bookended by sampled monologues from friends of the band. It is an example of the predominantly electric guitar-based genre the band employed at the time; featuring quiet, clean sections contrasting with loud, distorted sections, sometimes connected with crescendos and diminuendos. This dynamic contrast was referred to by the band as "serious guitar music".

"Yes! I Am a Long Way from Home" received a positive reception from music journalists, with album reviews focusing mainly on the effectiveness of the dynamic contrast featured within the song, the band's usage of instrumentation, and the track's overall representation of the band's genre at the time.

== Origins and recording ==
The first live performance documented of "Yes! I Am a Long Way from Home" was on 6 April 1997 at Highbury Garage in London—the band's first show promoting the Ten Rapid (Collected Recordings 1996–1997) compilation album. This performance, as well as several other performances of the track throughout 1997, was instrumental. During this period, "Yes! I Am a Long Way from Home" sometimes went under the title of "New Dom".

The song took its title from an exclamation from Lee Cohen, a Chicagoan friend of the band, at Brighton in May 1997. The band recorded "Yes! I Am a Long Way from Home" during the Mogwai Young Team sessions from July to August 1997 at MCM Studios in Hamilton, South Lanarkshire, Scotland, where the band had previously recorded the majority of their earlier material. The song was produced by Mogwai and Paul Savage, who handled production and mixing duties on the bulk of the band's previous recordings.

== Musical composition ==
"Yes! I Am a Long Way from Home"
Sample of "Yes! I Am a Long Way from Home" from Mogwai's 1997 album Mogwai Young Team

"Yes! I Am a Long Way from Home" is 5 minutes 58 seconds long, in the key of A major, in 4/4 time.

The song begins with an organ pedal point of an A note, accompanied by a recording of a monologue passage from a Bergen Student Newspaper, being recited by Mari Myren, referring to when Mogwai played a show on 15 March 1997 at the Hulen, in Bergen, Norway. Myren describes the band's music as "bigger than words and wider than pictures" and states that "If the stars had a sound, it would sound like this." The sound of clapping is heard, followed at 0:54, by a bassline. This is joined at 1:09 by a soft drumbeat and a clean, two-note guitar melody, based around the chord of A major. At 1:31, the guitars and bass guitar modulate to the relative minor chord, F♯ minor, and D major, and play alternate melody, before returning to the main melody.

This is repeated until 2:32, when the drumbeat gradually fades out, leaving only the ride cymbal keeping the beat, and the guitars, which repeat a melody based around the chord of A major, using harmonics. At 3:11, the bass guitar joins in, followed by the drum kit, building to a gradual crescendo, eventually climaxing at 3:42 into a distortion-laden chord progression, using the chords F♯ minor, D major, and A major. At 3:46, a guitar solo is played over these chords. This continues until 5:09, after all instruments have faded out except for the tremolo-laden feedback of the guitar.

== Release and reception ==
During professional reviews, "Yes! I Am a Long Way from Home" received largely positive reception. Ian Mathers of Stylus Magazine described the song as "gorgeous, moving from a gentle beginning to a series of shattering crescendos", also noting that it "describes almost all of Mogwai’s music at this stage of their career." David Wilson of The Daily Nebraskan described the song as having "low-key harmonics and [a] delicate melody", followed by "a blistering shard of explosive distortion [bursting] out of nowhere", noting that the dynamic contrast within the song, "sets the seesaw pace for the whole record."

Lee Harvey of Vox also referred to the dynamic contrast, noting that it "[goads] and [entices] you with gentle percussion, leaving you helpless before the surge of sky-swallowing guitars that follows". Scott Irvine of UpBeetMusic described it as a "standout track", also noting "[the] track alone is worth checking out 1997’s best bet for an instrumental tour de force".

Christopher Jackson of Fluffhouse described the track as a "to-the-point introduction to the classic Mogwai sound—elegant musings on a web of bass-heavy guitars, growing patiently to a peak filled out with massive distorted chords and fat drum fills". Brandon Wu of Ground and Sky described the song's progression, "[starting] with a quietly pretty melody ... [building] to a massive climax of guitar and bass noise." and "woven through [the] crescendo is a beautiful, lyrical guitar line ... simply stunning."

== Credits and personnel ==
Mogwai

- Dominic Aitchison – bass guitar
- Stuart Braithwaite – guitar
- Martin Bulloch – drum kit
- John Cummings – guitar
- Brendan O'Hare – guitar, organ, glockenspiel

Additional musicians

- Barry Burns – monologue
- Mari Myren – monologue

Production

- Paul Savage – production, mixing
