= Tracy (Mogwai song) =

Song by Mogwai

from the album Mogwai Young Team
- Released: 21 October 1997
- Recorded: MCM Studios; Hamilton, South Lanarkshire
- Genre: Post-rock; dream pop
- Length: 7:18
- Label: Chemikal Underground
- Songwriters: Dominic Aitchison, Stuart Braithwaite, John Cummings
- Producers: Paul Savage, Mogwai

"Tracy" is a song on the Scottish post-rock band Mogwai's 1997 debut album, Mogwai Young Team. The song was written by the band's guitarists Stuart Braithwaite and John Cummings and bassist Dominic Aitchison prior to the 1997 Mogwai Young Team recording sessions.

The song features glockenspiel, guitar, and drums, bookended by a sample from a phone call between Stuart Braithwaite and Will Simon (an employee of the band's American record label, Jet Set) and between the band's drummer Martin Bulloch and Colin Hardie (the band's manager at the time), revolving around a fictional disagreement between Braithwaite and Aitchison. The song differs from the genre the band usually employed at the time, known as "serious guitar music"; instead of being predominantly guitar-based and featuring heavy dynamic contrast, it features a glockenspiel ostinato, remaining dynamically quiet throughout.

"Tracy" received mostly positive reception from music journalists, with album reviews praising the song's quiet dynamics, the usage of varied instrumentation, and the inclusion of the sampled prank calls.

== Writing and recording ==
The song, titled "Tracy" after American singer-songwriter Tracy Chapman—whose song, "Fast Car" originally reminded the band of "Tracy" in its early stages—was rarely performed live before being recorded; the only documented performances were on 8 June 1997, at The Leadmill in Sheffield and 12 June 1997 at The Joiners in Southampton—both dates on a tour to promote the recently released 4 Satin EP.

The band recorded the song during the final week of the Mogwai Young Team sessions from July to August 1997 at MCM Studios, in Hamilton, South Lanarkshire, Scotland, where the band had previously recorded the majority of their earlier material. The song was produced and mixed by Paul Savage, who handled production and mixing duties on the bulk of the band's previous recordings.

== Musical composition ==
"Tracy"
Sample of "Tracy" from Mogwai's 1997 album Mogwai Young Team.

"Tracy" is 7 minutes 22 seconds long and played in the key of E minor, in 4/4 time. The song opens with ambient guitar noise and a bassline played by a bass guitar, which is joined at (0:06) by the sound of the first of two prank calls heard in the song, between Stuart Braithwaite and Will Simon—Braithwaite playing a joke on Simon, discussing what to do after a fight in the band while at the studio. At 0:53, a drumbeat enters, along with the quiet electric guitars in the background which slowly become more predominant.

At 1:18, the song's main melody is introduced, played by a guitar, the bass guitar and a glockenspiel, with a chord progression of E minor, C major seventh, G major, and D major. This is repeated until 3:28, when the guitars fade out into the background, and the drumbeat ends, leaving only the ride cymbal to keep the beat, and the main melody, which is repeated until it gradually fades out, leaving ambient guitar noise.

At 4:30, the second of two prank calls begins, between Martin Bulloch and Colin Hardie, who have a conversation in which Bulloch plays a joke on Hardie, saying that Aitchison and Braithwaite had a disagreement, causing the former to punch the latter, and leave. Hardie, who was in a bookmakers at the time of the call, suggests that Bulloch and Paul Savage continue mixing the song, and says he will try to contact Braithwaite. This ends at 7:04, leaving the sound of ambient guitar noise to fade out and end the song.

== Release and reception ==
During professional reviews, "Tracy" received mostly positive reception. Lee Harvey of Vox praised to the song's quiet dynamics and soft timbre, stating that it "stoutly [refuses] to rock out and accordingly [retains] a helium-light touch." John Mulvey of NME noted praised the presence of "a long phone conversation … in the background of "Tracy"'s dreamy atmospherics." Bryan Adair of Prog Archives praised the song's individuality from the rest of the album, describing it as "slow but utterly gorgeous … [relying] on a very different tone than the rest of the album" also comparing it to a film score, noting that it "[bore] resemblance to music from a sad movie scene."

Brandon Wu of Ground and Sky criticised the song's individuality from the rest of the album, saying "in any other context, "Tracy" … would be great, but here [it's] almost forgettable." Aaron Coleman of Almost Cool criticised the song's quiet dynamics, calling it "subdued."

French musician Kid Loco remixed the song in 1998 at the Lafayette Velvet Basement in France, titling it "Kid Loco's Playing with the Young Team Remix". It was released on the 1998 compilation album, Kicking a Dead Pig: Mogwai Songs Remixed, as well as Kid Loco's 1999 compilation album, Jesus Life for Children Under 12 Inches.

== Personnel and credits ==
Mogwai

- Dominic Aitchison – bass guitar
- Stuart Braithwaite – guitar, monologue
- Martin Bulloch – drum kit, monologue
- John Cummings – guitar
- Brendan O'Hare – guitar, glockenspiel

Additional musicians

- Colin Hardie – monologue
- Will Simon – monologue

Production

- Paul Savage – production, mixing
