= Mogwai Young Team =

Studio album by Mogwai
- Released: 21 October 1997
- Recorded: 1997
- Studio: MCM Studios (Hamilton, Scotland)
- Genre: Post-rock; noise rock; instrumental rock
- Length: 64:31
- Label: Chemikal Underground
- Producer: Paul Savage; Andy Miller

Mogwai chronology
4 Satin (1997)	Mogwai Young Team (1997)	Kicking a Dead Pig (1998)

Mogwai Young Team (also known as Young Team) is the debut studio album by Scottish post-rock band Mogwai. Produced by Paul Savage and Andy Miller, the album was released on 21 October 1997 through the Chemikal Underground record label.

Mogwai Young Team was re-released in May 2008 on Chemikal Underground, packaged as a remaster of the original album with a second disc containing rare tracks from the Young Team sessions and live recordings. Of the second disc, only "Young Face Gone Wrong" was previously unreleased; the following three tracks had earlier appeared on various compilation albums and other releases.

== Overview ==
"Tracy"
Sample of "Tracy".

Mogwai Young Team was recorded in summer 1997 at MCM Studios (now known as Gargleblast Studios) in Hamilton, Scotland, and was produced by Paul Savage and Andy Miller. It is largely instrumental, with one notable exception ("R U Still in 2 It", which features vocals from Aidan Moffat of Arab Strap), although many songs feature recordings of various individuals speaking, whether over the phone ("Tracy"), reading ("Yes! I Am a Long Way from Home"), or just rambling ("Katrien"). It features limited instrumentation, consisting mainly of guitar, bass and drums, although other instruments can sometimes be heard throughout the album, such as glockenspiel ("Tracy"), piano ("Radar Maker", "With Portfolio", "A Cheery Wave from Stranded Youngsters") and flute ("Mogwai Fear Satan"). The band had only written three of the songs before they entered the studio.

The cover, a photo taken and inverted by Brendan O'Hare, is of a Fuji Bank branch (since acquired by Mizuho Financial Group) located in Shibuya, Tokyo, Japan. The "MYT" logo found inside the cover was created by Adam Piggot and is based on a popular mark used by young gangs in Glasgow, Scotland; a "Young Team" is specific to an area: "Sighthill Young Team", for example.

The band took up pseudonyms for the liner notes on the album. Stuart Braithwaite was dubbed pLasmatroN. John Cummings took the nickname Cpt. Meat after his obsession for eating chops. Martin Bulloch adopted the alias bionic because of his heart pacemaker. Dominic Aitchison chose the name DEMONIC because of his childhood fear and nightmares of Lucifer, which would also inspire the album's end song "Mogwai Fear Satan". Brendan O'Hare, who was the oldest of the group by six years at 27 and had already been in several recording bands, was named +the relic+.

== Reception ==
Professional ratings
Review scores
Source	Rating
AllMusic	4.5/5 stars
The Encyclopedia of Popular Music	4/5 stars
The Guardian	3/5 stars
The Independent	3/5 stars
NME	9/10
Pitchfork	9.7/10 (1999); 9.2/10 (2008)
PopMatters	9/10
Record Collector	5/5 stars
The Rolling Stone Album Guide	3.5/5 stars

Mogwai Young Team peaked at number 75 on the UK Albums Chart. The album sold more than 60,000 copies in the United Kingdom.

In 2003, Mogwai Young Team was listed at number 97 on Pitchfork's Top 100 Albums of the 1990s.

In 2013, Mogwai Young Team was ranked number 177 on NME's Greatest Albums of All Time list.

== Track listing ==
No.	Title	Writer(s)	Length
1.	"Yes! I Am a Long Way from Home"	Dominic Aitchison	5:57
2.	"Like Herod"	Aitchison; Stuart Braithwaite; Martin Bulloch; John Cummings	11:41
3.	"Katrien"	Aitchison; Braithwaite	5:24
4.	"Radar Maker"	Cummings	1:35
5.	"Tracy"	Aitchison; Braithwaite; Cummings	7:19
6.	"Summer (Priority Version)"	Aitchison; Braithwaite	3:28
7.	"With Portfolio"	Aitchison; Braithwaite; Bulloch; Cummings; Brendan O'Hare	3:10
8.	"R U Still in 2 It"	Braithwaite; Aidan Moffat	7:20
9.	"A Cheery Wave from Stranded Youngsters"	Braithwaite; Bulloch	2:18
10.	"Mogwai Fear Satan"	Aitchison; Braithwaite; Bulloch	16:19
Total length:			64:31

Re-release bonus disc
No.	Title	Length
1.	"Young Face Gone Wrong" (outtake from Young Team recording sessions)	2:58
2.	"I Don't Know What to Say" (outtake from Young Team recording sessions, originally released on NME's Radio 1 Sound City CD, 1998)	1:15
3.	"I Can't Remember" (originally released on Glasgow EP compilation 7" on 'Plastic Cowboy' label, 1998)	3:14
4.	"Honey" (cover, originally released on A Tribute to Spacemen 3 CD on 'Rocket Girl' label, 1998)	4:18
5.	"Katrien" (live)	5:31
6.	"R U Still in 2 It" (live)	8:01
7.	"Like Herod" (live)	7:53
8.	"Summer (Priority)" (live)	2:59
9.	"Mogwai Fear Satan" (live)	10:26

== Personnel ==
Mogwai

- Stuart Braithwaite (listed as "pLasmatroN") – guitar, glockenspiel
- Dominic Aitchison (listed as "DEMONIC") – bass guitar
- Martin Bulloch (listed as "bionic") – drums
- John Cummings (listed as "Cpt. Meat") – guitar
- Brendan O'Hare (listed as "+the relic+") – piano, guitar

Additional musicians

- Barry Burns – backmasked monologue on "Yes! I Am a Long Way from Home"
- Mari Myren – monologue on "Yes! I Am a Long Way from Home"
- Aidan Moffat – vocals on "R U Still in 2 It"
- Shona Brown – flute on "Mogwai Fear Satan"

Production

- Paul Savage – production
- Andy Miller – production

Artwork and design

- Keith Cameron – liner notes (for 2008 deluxe reissue)
- Brendan O'Hare – cover photography
- Neale Smith – photography

== Charts ==
1997 chart performance for Mogwai Young Team
Chart (1997)	Peak position
Scottish Albums (OCC)	69
UK Albums (OCC)	75
UK Independent Albums (OCC)	10

2023 chart performance for Mogwai Young Team
Chart (2023)	Peak position
Belgian Albums (Ultratop Flanders)	169
German Albums (Offizielle Top 100)	65
Scottish Albums (OCC)	3
UK Albums (OCC)	62

== Certifications ==
Region	Certification	Certified units/sales
United Kingdom (BPI) 2023 release	Silver	60,000^{‡}
^{‡} Sales+streaming figures based on certification alone.

== Release history ==
Country	Release date	Record label	Format	Catalogue #
United States	21 October 1997	Jetset	CD	TWA07CD
United States	21 October 1997	Jetset	2LP	TWA07
United Kingdom	27 October 1997	Chemikal Underground	CD	CHEM018CD
United Kingdom	27 October 1997	Chemikal Underground	2LP	CHEM018
Australia/New Zealand	28 October 1997	Spunk	CD	URA013
United Kingdom	26 May 2008	Chemikal Underground	2CD reissue	CHEM106CD
United Kingdom	26 May 2008	Chemikal Underground	4-LP box set	CHEM106
Worldwide	10 February 2023	Chemikal Underground	CD (remastered)	CHEM262CD
Worldwide	10 February 2023	Chemikal Underground	Coloured 2LP (remastered)	CHEM262
