= Kicking a Dead Pig: Mogwai Songs Remixed =

Kicking a Dead Pig

Remix album by Mogwai
- Released: 1998
- Genre: Post-rock, electronic
- Length: 105:50
- Label: Eye Q

Mogwai chronology
Young Team (1997)	Kicking a Dead Pig (1998)	No Education = No Future (Fuck the Curfew) (1998)

Professional ratings
Review scores
Source	Rating
AllMusic	2/5 stars
Rock Sound	2.5/5 stars

Kicking a Dead Pig is a remix album from Scottish band Mogwai consisting of remixes of previously released tracks (primarily from Young Team) by various artists, including Alec Empire, My Bloody Valentine, and Max Tundra.

The album was first released in 1998 on the low budget label Eye Q, but they went bust shortly after. It then became relatively hard to find, until "the master tapes mysteriously appeared on Chemikal Underground's doorstep". The album was re-released on the Chemikal Underground label in 2001, with an additional two tracks forming the basis for a second CD of Mogwai Fear Satan remixes, from My Bloody Valentine, and μ-Ziq. In 1998, the album was licensed by Eye-Q to the now defunct label, Jetset. The version Jetset released contained all of the Mogwai Fear Satan remixes on a second disc.

== Track listing ==
The following corresponds to the 1998 double CD release. Single CD and double/triple vinyl releases also exist.

=== Disc one: Kicking a Dead Pig ===
1. "Like Herod" (Hood remix) – 6:54
2. "Helicon 2" (Max Tundra remix) – 7:19
3. "Summer" (Klute's Weird Winter remix) – 6:31
4. "Gwai on 45" (Arab Strap remix) – 8:26
5. "A Cheery Wave from Stranded Youngsters" (Third Eye Foundation Tet Offensive remix) – 5:06
6. "Like Herod" (Alec Empire's Face the Future remix) – 5:06
7. "R U Still In 2 It?" (DJ Q remix) – 8:15
8. "Tracy" (Kid Loco's Playing with the Young Team remix) – 8:32
9. "Mogwai Fear Satan" (Mogwai remix, LP version) – 9:55

=== Disc two: Mogwai Fear Satan remixes ===
1. "Mogwai Fear Satan" (Mogwai remix) – 9:48
2. "Mogwai Fear Satan" (μ-Ziq remix) – 7:23
3. "Mogwai Fear Satan" (Surgeon remix) – 6:25
4. "Mogwai Fear Satan" (My Bloody Valentine remix) – 16:10

== Charts ==
Chart performance for Kicking a Dead Pig
Chart (1998)	Peak position
UK Albums (OCC)	99
UK Independent Albums (OCC)	15
