= Frez =

Frez may refer to:

- Ilya Frez (1909-1994) Russian film director
- Frez. Amédée-François Frézier
- "Frez", song by Mogwai from Every Country's Sun
