= Christmas Steps =

Christmas Steps may refer to:

- Christmas Steps, Bristol, a road in Bristol, England
- "Christmas Steps" (composition), a song by Mogwai
