= Mexican Grand Prix (disambiguation) =

The Mexican Grand Prix (renamed the Mexico City Grand Prix in 2021) is the Formula One race held at the Autódromo Hermanos Rodríguez, in Mexico City.

Mexican Grand Prix may also refer to:

- Grand Prix of Mexico, a Champ Car World Series race held at the Autódromo Hermanos Rodríguez that was later renamed to Gran Premio Tecate
- Mexico City Grand Prix (badminton), a badminton tournament
- Grand Prix of Monterrey, a Champ Car World Series race held on a street circuit at Fundidora Park, Monterrey
- "Mexican Grand Prix", a track by Mogwai from the album Hardcore Will Never Die, but You Will
