= Rock Action =

Rock Action may refer to:

- Rock Action (album), a 2001 album by Mogwai
- Rock Action (TV channel), a Southeast Asian pay TV channel
- Rock Action Records, a Scottish record label
- Scott Asheton (1949–2014), nicknamed "Rock Action", American musician, drummer for the Stooges
