= The Bad Fire =

Studio album by Mogwai
- Released: 24 January 2025
- Recorded: 2024
- Studio: Chem 19 Studios, Blantyre, Scotland
- Genre: Post-rock
- Length: 54:51
- Label: Rock Action; Temporary Residence Limited
- Producer: John Congleton

Mogwai chronology
As the Love Continues (2021)	The Bad Fire (2025)

Professional ratings
Aggregate scores
Source	Rating
Metacritic	81/100
Review scores
Source	Rating
The Guardian	4/5 stars
Pitchfork	7.4/10
Kerrang!	4/5 stars
The Skinny	5/5 stars
The Quietus	Favorable
Ghost Cult Magazine	9/10
Sputnikmusic	3.3/5

The Bad Fire is the eleventh studio album by the Scottish post-rock band Mogwai, released on 24 January 2025 on Rock Action Records in the UK and Europe, and on Temporary Residence Limited in the US. Produced by John Congleton, the album was preceded by the singles, "God Gets You Back", "Lion Rumpus" and "Fanzine Made of Flesh".

== Overview ==
The album is the successor to 2021's As the Love Continues, and was produced by John Congleton and recorded at Chem 19 Studios in Scotland. The cover art by Dave "DLT" Thomas features a painting of a volcanic crater; the phrase "Bad Fire" being an old Scottish name for hell. Three tracks ("God Gets You Back", "Lion Rumpus" and "Fanzine Made of Flesh") were released on or before the announcement date of the album.

In a press release accompanying the announcement of the album, the band said "After the high of putting out As the Love Continues, the following years were personally hard for us. We’ve dealt with a lot of loss and in Barry’s case a serious family illness with one of his daughters. Getting back together to write and record this record felt like a refuge and with John Congleton we feel that we’ve made something special. We often hear from people that our music has helped them get through hard times in their lives and for once I think it applies to us as well."

== Track listing ==
The album was released on CD and digital download with ten tracks. Deluxe versions were also available, including vinyl editions and a box set, some of which featured a bonus disc (12" vinyl or CD) containing demo versions of album tracks.

All songs written by Mogwai.

No.	Title	Length
1.	"God Gets You Back"	6:41
2.	"Hi Chaos"	5:24
3.	"What Kind of Mix Is This?"	4:12
4.	"Fanzine Made of Flesh"	4:34
5.	"Pale Vegan Hip Pain"	4:25
6.	"If You Find This World Bad, You Should See Some of the Others"	7:23
7.	"18 Volcanoes"	6:19
8.	"Hammer Room"	5:17
9.	"Lion Rumpus"	3:33
10.	"Fact Boy"	7:03
Total length:		54:51

On many vinyl copies, side four contains no listenable tracks.

== Credits ==
- Mogwai: Dominic Aitchison, Stuart Braithwaite, Martin Bulloch, Barry Burns (Note: Information from album liner notes and credits.)
- Produced and mixed by John Congleton
- Violin and additional guitar by Luke Sutherland
- Lyrics on "God Gets You Back" by Rosa Burns
- Artwork by Dave Thomas ("DLT")

== Charts ==
Chart performance for The Bad Fire
Chart (2025)	Peak position
Austrian Albums (Ö3 Austria)	47
Belgian Albums (Ultratop Flanders)	22
Belgian Albums (Ultratop Wallonia)	32
Croatian International Albums (HDU)	37
French Albums (SNEP)	72
German Albums (Offizielle Top 100)	16
Irish Independent Albums (IRMA)	7
Scottish Albums (OCC)	1
Swiss Albums (Schweizer Hitparade)	16
UK Albums (OCC)	5
UK Independent Albums (OCC)	2
