= CaVa Studios =

Recording studio in Glasgow, Scotland

Coordinates: 55.8666°N 4.28488°W

Ca Va Studios or Ca Va Sound is a professional recording studio based in the West End of Glasgow, Scotland. CaVa has previously had bases both in Glasgow and Edinburgh.

The studios began in 1974 started by founder Brian Young and his team. Since then have recorded some of the biggest names in both UK and international music scenes including John Martyn, Westlife, Belle and Sebastian, Billy Rankin, Paolo Nutini, Robbie Williams and Take That, The Script, Ed Sheeran, Snow Patrol, Avril Lavigne, Black Eyed Peas, Texas, Jessie J, The Proclaimers, Rage Against the Machine, Travis, Red Hot Chili Peppers, David Byrne, Mogwai, Eddi Reader and The Fall, amongst others. The studio hosts a Neve VR Legend mixing console and is the only studio in Scotland to have PrismSound audio converters.

Ca Va Sound also owns Scotland's only professional independent mobile studio which hosts an SSL4000E 48 track console and Pro Tools.

The studio takes its name from the former band of founder, Brian Young, "Ca Va". Brian was also a lecturer at Perth College of Further Education in Scotland for many years, and a Board of Management member at Stow College, Glasgow.

A large recording studio with the Neve console, a smaller broadcast ISDN studio and the Ca Va Soundmobile.
