= Barry Burns =

- Born: Barry Burns
- Origin: Glasgow, Scotland
- Occupations: Musician; songwriter
- Instruments: Guitar; bass; keyboards; drums; flute; violin; sampler; vocals
- Years active: 1998–present
- Labels: Chemikal Underground; Matador; Play It Again Sam; Rock Action
- Member of: Mogwai
- Website: http://www.mogwai.co.uk

Barry Burns is a Scottish musician best known for his work with post-rock band Mogwai.

== Early life ==
Burns went to Cardinal Newman High School in Bellshill before enrolling with the Royal Scottish Academy of Music and Drama in Glasgow, taking up a Bachelor of Education degree in teaching music. He did not finish the degree, completing only 3 years of the course. He broke his finger, which is why he did not go back, though he has also said that he was not at ease with the teaching part of the course.

== Career ==
=== Mogwai ===
Burns joined Mogwai just before the recording of their second album, Come on Die Young. He had already played a few gigs with the band beforehand as a flautist and occasional pianist. According to Stuart Braithwaite, Burns joined the band because he was a "good laugh". Burns is a versatile multi-instrumentalist and contributes (among other things) keyboards, guitar, vocals (mainly through a Vocoder), and flute. He is also the only member of Mogwai with a formal foundation in music theory, but he claims he is "a bit rusty".

=== Other ===
Burns contributed piano and organ to the Arab Strap albums Elephant Shoe, The Red Thread, Monday at the Hug and Pint and The Last Romance. He contributed piano, organ, rhodes and vocals to Malcolm Middleton's albums 5:14 Fluoxytine Seagull Alcohol John Nicotine, Into The Woods, A Brighter Beat and Sleight of Heart. He also contributed guitar and Fender Rhodes to the 2004 album Grown Backwards by David Byrne on the track "Tiny Apocalypse" and played keyboards on the 2009 album Prevention by Scottish band De Rosa. He often plays DJ sets, occasionally alongside fellow band member Stuart Braithwaite.

Burns completed the soundtrack to the Felipe Bustos Sierra documentary Everybody to Kenmure Street (exec produced by Emma Thompson). The soundtrack is expected to arrive in Spring 2026, released as a solo project under the same Mogwai label Rock Action Records.

Along with wife Rachel, Burns owned the bar Das Gift in the Neukölln district of Berlin between 2009 and 2021.
