= John Cummings (musician) =

Scottish musician and record producer

Background information
- Born: John Cummings
- Origin: Glasgow, Scotland
- Genres: Post-rock; instrumental rock
- Occupations: Musician; record producer; songwriter
- Instruments: Guitar; bass; keyboards; drums
- Years active: 1995–present
- Labels: Chemikal Underground; Matador; Play It Again Sam; Rock Action
- Formerly of: Mogwai
- Website: http://www.mogwai.co.uk/

John Cummings is a Scottish musician and record producer, best known for being a former member of Glaswegian band Mogwai, mostly playing guitar, as well as programming, production, keyboards and vocals.

== Career ==
=== Mogwai ===
After forming and playing a few gigs in 1995 as a three-piece, Mogwai enlisted John Cummings on guitar. Though he mostly contributed guitar to the band, Cummings also sung on the track "Boring Machines Disturbs Sleep", from 2003's Happy Songs for Happy People. He left Mogwai in November 2015 to pursue a solo career.

=== The Reindeer Section ===
Cummings was briefly a member of indie rock supergroup, The Reindeer Section, contributing guitar to the first album.

=== Other ===
Cummings produced Part Chimp's albums Chart Pimp and I Am Come, the Errors EP How Clean is your Acid House?, The Magnificents album Year of Explorers, Trout's Norma Jean EP and Street Horrrsing by Fuck Buttons.

He also contributed guitar to The Zephyrs' Setting Sun from their 2001 album When The Sky Comes Down It Comes Down On Your Head, and their 2004 album, A Year to the Day. In 2015, Cummings composed the musical score of the documentary film S Is for Stanley.

== Equipment ==
Throughout his tenure in Mogwai, Cummings has mainly used various models of the Fender Telecaster Custom and Gibson SG, often using irregular tunings.

=== Effects pedals ===
- Boss AW-3 Dynamic Wah
- Boss DD-7 Digital Delay
- Boss LS-2 Line Selector
- Boss OS-2 Overdrive/Distortion (2)
- Boss ODB-3 Bass Overdrive
- Boss TR-2 Tremolo
- Boss TU-2 Chromatic Tuner
- Death By Audio Interstellar Overdrive Deluxe
- Death By Audio Supersonic Fuzz Gun
- Electro-Harmonix HOG (2)
- Electro-Harmonix Holy Stain
- Electro-Harmonix Stereo Memory Man With Hazarai
- Jim Dunlop Uni-Vibe
- MXR Carbon Copy Delay
- MXR Phase 90 Script
- MXR Kerry King 10 Band EQ (2)
- Way Huge Fat Sandwich
- Way Huge Auquapus
- T-Rex Dr Swamp Distortion/Overdrive
