= Martin Bulloch =

Scottish musician (born 1974)

- Born: Martin Bulloch; 14 August 1974 (age 52); Bellshill, Lanarkshire, Scotland
- Origin: East Kilbride, Lanarkshire, Scotland
- Genres: Instrumental rock; post-rock
- Occupation: Musician
- Instruments: Drums; percussion
- Years active: 1995–present
- Labels: Chemikal Underground; Matador; Play It Again Sam; Sub Pop Records; Rock Action
- Member of: Mogwai
- Website: http://www.mogwai.co.uk/

Martin Bulloch (born 14 August 1974) is a Scottish musician, best known for being the drummer in the rock band Mogwai.

== Early life ==
Bulloch was born in Bellshill, North Lanarkshire, Scotland.

== Career ==
=== Mogwai ===
Bulloch plays drums in the Glaswegian post-rock group Mogwai. Mogwai was formed in 1995 by friends Stuart Braithwaite, Dominic Aitchison, and Bulloch.

=== Other ===
Bulloch has also drummed for Arab Strap and Gruff Rhys at some gigs.
