= Dominic Aitchison =

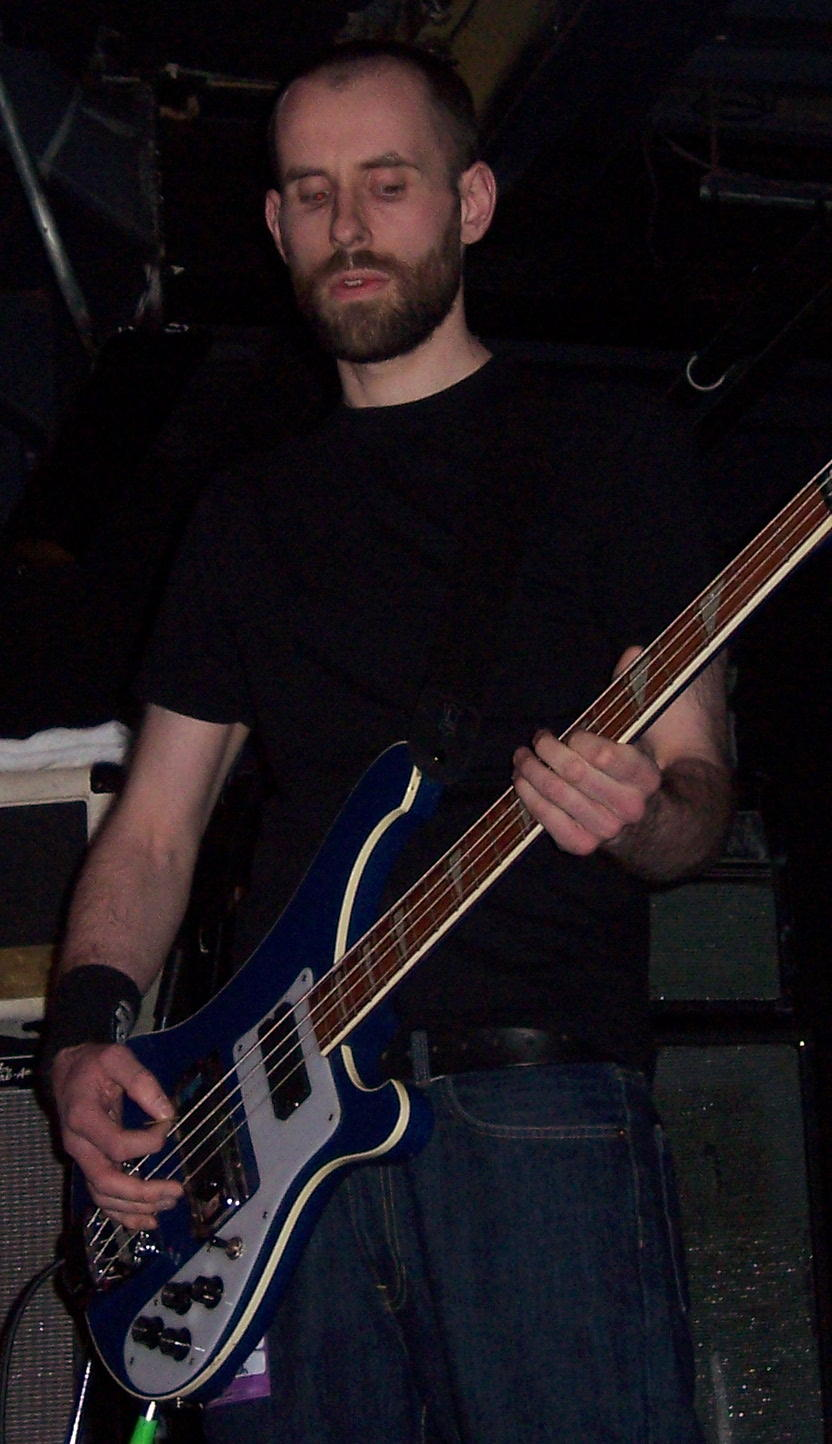
- Aitchison performing with Mogwai at The Avalon on 6 March 2006

Background information
- Born: Dominic Aitchison; 11 October 1976 (age 50)
- Origin: Balfron, Stirlingshire, Scotland
- Genre: Post rock
- Occupations: Musician; songwriter
- Instruments: Bass; guitar; keyboards
- Years active: 1995–present
- Labels: Rock Action; Wall of Sound
- Member of: Mogwai
- Website: mogwai.co.uk crippledblackphoenix.com

Dominic Aitchison (born 11 October 1976) is a Scottish bassist and songwriter. He is best known as the bassist and founding member of post-rock band Mogwai. Aside from Mogwai, he also played bass guitar in Crippled Black Phoenix and Stage Blood.

Aitchison studied Graphic Design at The Glasgow College of Building and Printing, which is now part of the City of Glasgow College.

He founded Mogwai with Stuart Braithwaite, along with drummer Martin Bulloch. He was the main songwriter of the band at the beginning of their career (along with Braithwaite), before the "new" member Barry Burns became it.

A versatile bass player, Aitchison often plays with plectrum to better complement the sound of his band but is also very capable at using finger plucking technique.
