= Stuart Braithwaite =

Scottish musician

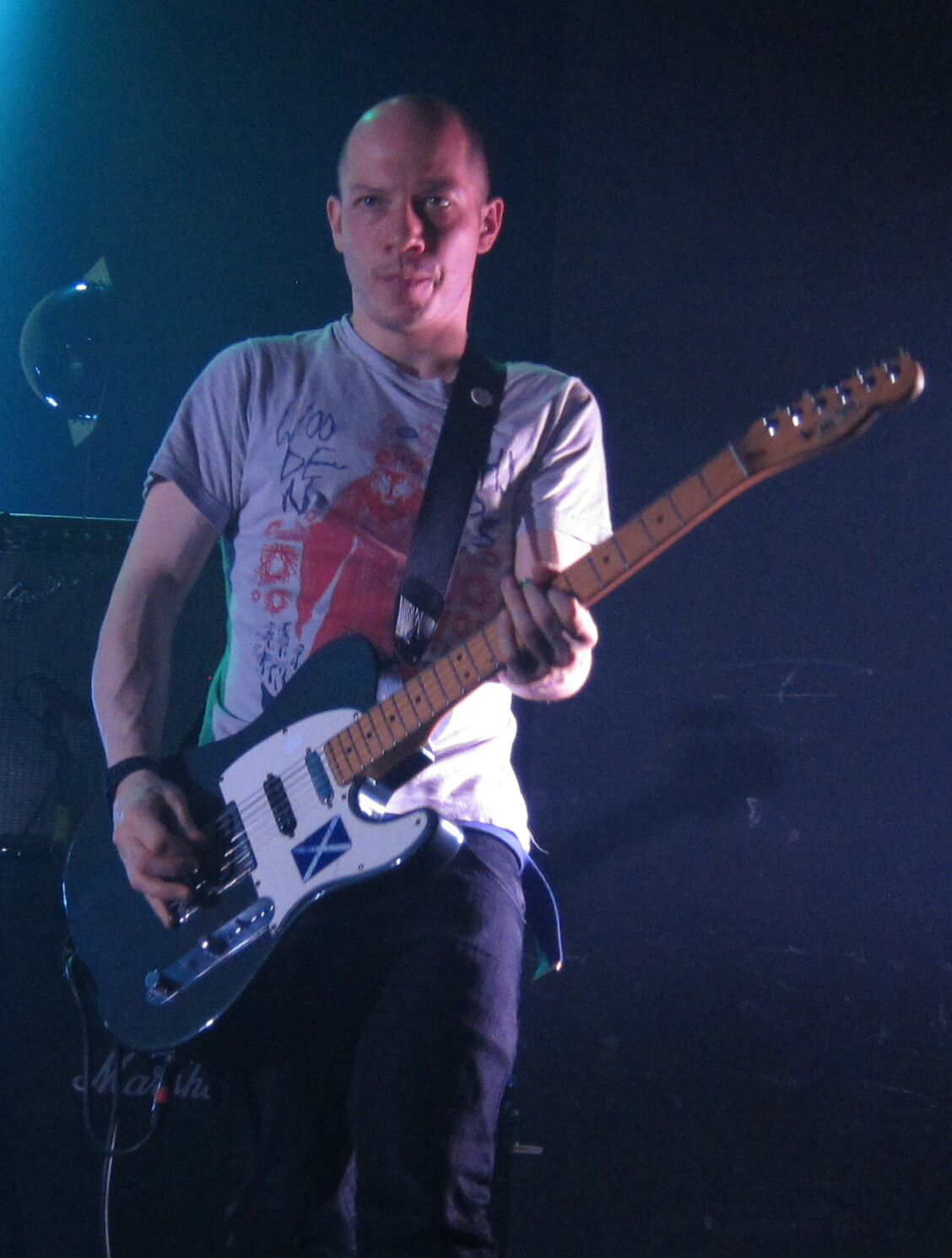
- Braithwaite in 2011

Background information
- Born: Stuart Leslie Braithwaite; 10 May 1976 (age 50); Lanark, Scotland
- Origin: Glasgow, Scotland
- Genres: Post rock; instrumental rock; art rock
- Instruments: Vocals; guitar; bass
- Years active: 1995–present
- Labels: Rock Action; Wall of Sound; Matador
- Member of: Mogwai
- Website: mogwai.scot

Stuart Leslie Braithwaite (born 10 May 1976) is a Scottish singer, songwriter, and musician. He is the vocalist and guitarist of post-rock band Mogwai, with whom he has recorded ten studio albums. He is also a member of the British alternative rock supergroups Minor Victories and Silver Moth. He has used the name Plasmatron in the credits of Mogwai's debut album Mogwai Young Team, as a social media handle, and as the name of his signature guitar pedal.

== Early life ==
Braithwaite's family, on his mother's side, originate from Flesherin on the Isle of Lewis; he was born in Lanark and raised in the rural Clyde Valley. His father was a telescope maker and was involved in the placing of Sighthill stone circle; in 2013 Braithwaite organised a benefit concert to raise funds for the campaign to save the stones, which were then under threat from a proposed redevelopment.

Braithwaite grew up listening to records by The Cure, Joy Division, The Stooges, The Velvet Underground, Black Sabbath and other artists. At age 10-11, he bought his first electric guitar and “totally fell in love with it”. He attended Strathaven Academy from 1987 to 1993. Before playing in Mogwai, Braithwaite fronted a band called Deadcat Motorbike, who broke up in June 1995. Braithwaite also drummed for Scottish band Eska at one point.

Braithwaite has an older sister named Victoria.

== Career ==
=== Formation and first years of Mogwai (1995–1996) ===
Braithwaite met Dominic Aitchison at a Ned's Atomic Dustbin show at the Queen Margaret Union in Glasgow on 10 April 1991, and four years later, along with school friend Martin Bulloch, they formed Mogwai.

=== Solo work and Rock Action (2000–2002) ===
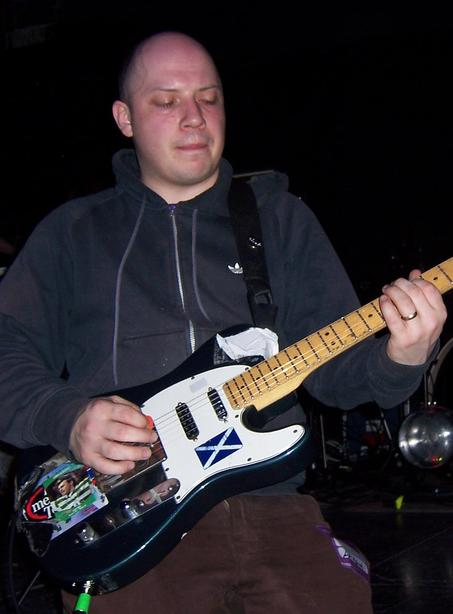
Braithwaite in 2006

In 2000, Braithwaite played with a band called Mighty Joe Young Trio. In 2000 and 2002, Braithwaite performed solo acoustic shows. In 2002, Braithwaite, Aidan Moffat and Colin "Sheepy" McPherson released an eponymously titled EP called The Sick Anchors. He is also a member of the British alternative rock supergroup Minor Victories.

=== Film ===
In 2016, Braithwaite took part in a documentary about the Glasgow music scene and Chemikal Underground called Lost in France. The film was directed by Niall McCann and brought Braithwaite (along with members of The Delgados, Franz Ferdinand and others) to Mauron, Brittany, to recreate a gig they played there just after Mogwai had formed. The film features Mogwai live, as well as footage of Braithwaite playing Mogwai tracks solo. It also shows Braithwaite playing live with Alex Kapranos of Franz Ferdinand and musicians such as Emma Pollock, RM Hubbert and Holy Mountain, and interviews with Braithwaite and his old label-mates. Lost in France premiered at the Edinburgh International Film Festival to wholly positive reviews and was called "Funny, vital and sobering" by Scotland's arts publication The Skinny.

=== Memoir ===
In 2022, Braitwaite's memoir Spaceships Over Glasgow: Mogwai, Mayhem and Misspent Youth was published by White Rabbit, an imprint of Orion Publishing Group. Fiona Shepherd in The Scotsman called it "neither a glamorous nor an indulgent account and, as such, probably closer to imparting what it is actually like being in a successful band."

== Musical style ==
Braithwaite's musical technique is characterised by the heavy usage of effects pedals, used to create ambient instrumental guitar sounds. As with much music associated with the post-rock style, his playing emphasizes melody and dynamic contrast over virtuosity.

In 2021, Reuss Musical Instruments of Denmark released the Plasmatron, a Stuart Braithwaite signature guitar effects pedal. The circuit is based on the Danelectro Fab-Tone Distortion and the Electro-Harmonix op-amp Big Muff, with the two effects mixed in parallel.

== Personal life ==
Braithwaite married musician Elisabeth Elektra in April 2019, they separated in 2026. He was previously married to music promoter Grainne Braithwaite-Vedamanikam. Braithwaite is a supporter of Celtic F.C.

Braithwaite is a vegan.
