= Universal Audio (album) =

Studio album by The Delgados
- Released: 20 September 2004
- Studio: Chem19, Hamilton, Scotland
- Genre: Indie rock, pop
- Length: 40:42
- Label: Chemikal Underground
- Producer: Tony Doogan, the Delgados

The Delgados chronology
| Hate (2002) | Universal Audio (2004) | The Complete BBC Peel Sessions (2006) |

Singles from Hate
- 1. "Everybody Come Down" Released: 6 September 2004; 2. "Girls of Valour" Released: 14 March 2005

Universal Audio is the fifth and final studio album by Scottish rock band the Delgados, released 20 September 2004 through Chemikal Underground. While touring in support of their fourth studio album Hate (2004), the band members felt disconnected from the live shows due to bringing extra musicians with them. They recorded their next album at Chem19 studios in Hamilton, Scotland, with Tony Doogan and the band splitting the producing role. Universal Audio is a pop album that strips away the orchestral rock sound of Hate and their third studio album The Great Eastern (2000).

Universal Audio received universal acclaim from critics, many of whom highlighted its stripped-down sound, while retaining high-quality songwriting. It charted at number 49 in Scotland, and number 105 in the UK. Its lead single "Everybody Come Down" peaked at number 56 in Scotland, and number 67 in the UK. The second single, "Girls of Valour", charted at number 98 in the UK. "Everybody Come Down" was released on 6 September 2004, which was followed by a tour of the United Kingdom. The Delgados toured the United States and Europe to end the year; after a Scottish tour in February 2005, "Girls of Valour" was released on 14 March 2005.

== Background and recording ==
The Delgados released their fourth studio album, Hate, in October 2002 through Mantra Recordings. Both of its two singles – "Coming in from the Cold" and "All You Need Is Hate" – charted at the lower end of the top 100 of the UK Singles Chart. When practicing the material for touring, vocalist and guitarist Emma Pollock said the band came to the conclusion that the "majority of our live experience wasn't our band playing, but the other musicians [we brought along]. It can feel a little disconnected".

The Delgados went on a three-week UK tour at end of 2002 supporting Doves, and then a headlining stint of their own in January and February 2003. They followed it up with a trek to the United States in April 2003, and another UK tour the following month, leading up to the benefit event Concern Concert for Africa. Universal Audio was recorded at Chem19 Studios in Hamilton, Scotland, with Tony Doogan and the band acting as producers; Doogan also handled recording and mixing.

== Composition and lyrics ==
Universal Audio is an indie rock and upbeat pop release that contrasted the orchestral rock of Hate and their third studio album The Great Eastern (2000). It is more stripped-down than those releases, losing a lot of the strings and reverb that exemplified them. Universal Audio has been compared to Skylarking (1986) by XTC, Songs from Northern Britain (1997) by Teenage Fanclub, and Final Straw (2003) by Snow Patrol. Woodward said the band used what they learned about "dynamics and music and the emotion of different voices or instrumentation and apply that to what we can do singing and playing guitar". The album's opening track, "I Fought the Angels", evoked Bossanova (1990) Pixies. "Is This All That I Came For?" is mid-tempo song. "Everybody Come Down" is a sunshine pop track that is reminiscent of the work of Belle and Sebastian.

"Come Down" consists of Pollock's vocals, a piano part, and cello from Alan Barr. "Get Action!" pairs an acoustic guitar and harmonica (played by Stevie Jackson of Belle and Sebastian) with a trumpet section, and sees Woodward wanted to make a symphony. Brother of drummer Paul Savage, Jamie Savage, contributed acoustic guitar to "Sink or Swim". "Bits of Bone" features handclaps and channels the sound of XTC; "The City Consumes Us" highlights the love-hate relationship that musicians have with their hometowns. "Girls of Valour" is an upbeat, indie pop and techno track, with Beach Boys-styled vocal harmonies. Mother and the Addicts contributed backing vocals to "Keep on Breathing", which also features Barr on cello, and accordion by Susan Turner. The album closes out with "Now and Forever", which sees both Woodward and Pollack sing in ascending falsettos against an bagpipe-enhanced orchestral rock sound.

== Release ==
On 30 July 2004, Universal Audio was announced for release in less than two months' time. The Delgados (with Barr on keyboards) did a Peel session on 2 September 2004, where they performed "I Fought the Angels", "Ballad of Accounting", "Is This All That I Came For?", and "Everybody Come Down". "Everybody Come Down" was released as the album's lead single on 6 September 2004, with "Don't Leave Clean" and "I See Secrets" as the B-sides. Universal Audio was released on 20 September 2004 through Chemikal Underground, which was followed by a brief tour of the UK, with support from Sons & Daughters.

Following this, the Delgados toured across the United States until November 2004. During the trek, the band held four in-store performances at record stores. To close out the year, the Delgados embarked on a European tour in December 2004. In February 2005, the band played shows across Scotland as part of the Tune Up tour, an initiative by the Scottish Arts Council. "Girls of Valour" was released as the album's second single on 14 March 2005, with covers of "Ballad of Accounting" (originally by Ewan MacColl) and "Last Rose of Summer" (originally by the Symbols) as B-sides. After bassist Stewart Henderson left earlier in the year, the Delgados decided to split up on 8 April 2005.

== Reception ==
Professional ratings
Aggregate scores
| Source | Rating |
|---|---|
| Metacritic | 82/100 |
Review scores
| Source | Rating |
| AllMusic | 4/5 stars |
| Cokemachineglow | 75% |
| Entertainment Weekly | B− |
| The Guardian | 4/5 stars |
| Now | 4/5 |
| Pitchfork | 7.6/10 |
| RTÉ.ie | 4/5 stars |
| Spin | B |
| Stylus | A |
| This Is Fake DIY | 4/5 stars |

Universal Audio was met with universal acclaim from music critics. At Metacritic, which assigns a normalized rating out of 100 to reviews from mainstream publications, the album received an average score of 82, based on 17 reviews.

AllMusic reviewer James Christopher Monger said the album was "not a success upon first listen", though with subsequent airings the "listener is rewarded once again with something rich, happily overcast, and strangely intangible". Cokemachineglow editor Dom Sinacola found that despite the album's stripped-down direction, it was "just as intricate and meticulously constructed as its sweetly headfucking predecessors". He added the band managed to "chisel out a surprising marble slab of pop love". Timothy Gunatilaka of Entertainment Weekly said that though it seems that the band swapped their "lush campfire symphonies for a generic indie groove [...], halfway through, the harmonious majesty of previous records like The Great Eastern returns on Universal Audio".

The Guardian's David Peschek saw the album as a representation of "four people playing together in a band," lacing the "lavish orchestrations and over-production that occasionally overpowered the songs on Hate". Now writer Dylan Young suggest that fans that liked the previous two releases would find Universal Audio "hard to swallow" as the "stripped-down treatment of the songs" gave the band their "most nuanced effort to date". Ray Donoghue of RTÉ.ie concurred, adding that it was an album which "champions simplicity, seeming almost skeletal in comparison to previous releases". The staff at Spin liked its "more restrained" sound, swapping the orchestra for "basic sun-dappled guitar pop".

Pitchfork contributor Chris Dahlen wrote that Pollock "all but steals the show", coming across as "powerfully bare and introspective", while Woodward's vocal appearances were "bold and unflappable, and as such, his approach seems at odds with Pollock's". PopMatters' Jason MacNail stated that the "dichotomy of having two lead singers just as comfortable in front as they are supporting the other is one of the band's greatest assets". Stylus editor William B. Swygart felt that the album comes across as a "little unnerving and it sounds as though they’re trying to unlearn their now somewhat ingrained habits". Stephen Ackroyd of This Is Fake DIY said that the band's biggest strength was their "ability to take mainstream sensibilities, and graft them onto songs that no other band could pull of[f]".

Universal Audio peaked at number 49 in Scotland, and number 105 in the UK. "Everybody Come Down" charted at number 56 in Scotland, and number 67 in the UK. "Girls of Valour" charted at number 98 in the UK.

== Track listing ==
All tracks written by the Delgados.

1. "I Fought the Angels" – 3:20
2. "Is This All That I Came For?" – 3:16
3. "Everybody Come Down" – 3:14
4. "Come Undone" – 3:31
5. "Get Action!" – 4:19
6. "Sink or Swim" – 2:57
7. "Bits of Bone" – 2:45
8. "The City Consumes Us" – 4:14
9. "Girls of Valour" – 3:56
10. "Keep on Breathing" – 4:06
11. "Now and Forever" – 5:04

== Personnel ==
Personnel per booklet.

The Delgados

- Alun Woodward – guitar, vocals
- Emma Pollock – guitar, vocals
- Stewart Henderson – bass
- Paul Savage – drums

Additional musicians

- Alan Barr – cello (tracks 4 and 10)
- Stevie Jackson – harmonica (track 5)
- Mother and the Addicts – backing vocals (track 10)
- Jamie Savage – acoustic guitar (track 6)
- Lewis Turner – keyboards, piano
- Susan Turner – accordion (track 10)

Production and design

- Tony Doogan – recording, mixing, producer
- The Delgados – producer
- Bulletproof ID – artwork design
- Stuart Reidman – portrait photography
- Kirsty Anderson – group photography

== Charts ==
Chart performance for Universal Audio
| Chart (2004) | Peak position |
|---|---|
| Scottish Albums (OCC) | 49 |
| UK Albums (OCC) | 105 |
| UK Independent Albums (OCC) | 14 |
