= The Complete BBC Peel Sessions =

Compilation album by The Delgados
- Released: 12 June 2006 (UK)
- Recorded: Live, various
- Genre: Indie rock
- Label: Chemikal Underground

The Delgados chronology
Universal Audio (2004)	The Complete BBC Peel Sessions (2006)

Professional ratings
Review scores
Source	Rating
AllMusic	4/5 stars
Pitchfork Media	(8.5/10)

The Complete BBC Peel Sessions is an album by The Delgados, released after the band broke up. It was released on their own Chemikal Underground record label in 2006 after they acquired the rights at the start of the year.

== Session information ==
- Alun Woodward - guitar, vocal
- Emma Pollock - guitar, vocal
- Stewart Henderson - bass guitar
- Paul Savage - drums

Session 1 - 13/05/1995

Lazarwalker
Blackwell
I've Only Just Started to Breathe
Primary Alternative

Producer - Stewart Cruickshank

Engineer - Tony Doogan

Session 2 - 12/05/1996

Under Canvas Under Wraps
4th Channel
Teen Elf
Sucrose

Violin - Gayle Harrison
Session 3 - 16/07/1997

Everything Goes Around the Water
The Arcane Model
Pull the Wires from the Wall
Mauron Chanson

Producer - Mike Eagles

Flute - Camille Mason
Violin - Emily MacPherson
Engineer - Colin Marshall
Violin - Jennifer Christie
Cello - Alan Barr

Session 4 - 17/06/1998

Repeat Failure
Don't Stop
Blackpool
The Weaker Argument Defeats the Stronger

Producer - Mike Robinson

Cello - Alan Barr
Engineer - Simon Askew

Session 5 - 29/03/2000

No Danger
Make Your Move
Accused of Stealing
Aye Today

Producer - James Birtwistle

Engineer - Guy Worth
Cello - Alan Barr
Viola - Charlie Cross
Piano - Colin MacPherson
Violin - Oliver Langford, Jeremy Birchall, Vuk Karkovic
Flute - Camille Mason

Session 6 - 16/10/2002

Mr. Blue Sky
California über alles
Matthew and Son
Last Rose of Summer

Producer - Guy Worth

Cello - Alan Barr
Violin - David Lang
Engineer - Nick Fountain
Violin - Kobis Frick
Piano - Lewis Turner

Burns Night Special - 26/01/2003

Parcel of Rogues

Piano - Lewis Turner
Session 7 - 02/09/2004

I Fought the Angels
Ballad of Accounting
Is This All That I Came For?
Everybody Come Down

Producer - Simon Askew

Keyboards - Alan Barr
Engineer - Nick Scripps

== Reviews ==
- Uncut 4/5
- Mojo 4/5
- NME 9/10
- Sunday Herald 4/5

== Track listing ==
Disc 1

1. "Lazarwalker"
2. "Blackwell"
3. "I've Only Just Started To Breathe"
4. "Primary Alternative"
5. "Under Canvas Under Wraps"
6. "4th Channel"
7. "Teen Elf"
8. "Sucrose"
9. "Everything Goes Around The Water"
10. "Arcane Model"
11. "Pull The Wires From The Wall"
12. "Mauron Chanson"
13. "Repeat Failure"
14. "Don't Stop"
15. "Blackpool"
16. "Weaker Argument Defeats The Stronger"

Disc 2

1. "No Danger"
2. "Make Your Move"
3. "Accused of Stealing"
4. "Aye Today"
5. "Mr. Blue Sky" (originally by Electric Light Orchestra)
6. "California über alles" (originally by Dead Kennedys)
7. "Matthew and Son" (originally by Cat Stevens)
8. "Last Rose of Summer"
9. "Parcel of Rogues"
10. "I Fought the Angels"
11. "Ballad of Accounting" (originally by Ewan MacColl)
12. "Is This All That I Came For"
13. "Everybody Come Down"
