= Hate (The Delgados album) =

Studio album by the Delgados
- Released: 14 October 2002
- Studios: CaVa Sound (Glasgow, Scotland); Chem19 (Glasgow, Scotland); Tarbox Road (Cassadaga, New York)
- Genre: Orchestral pop
- Length: 47:31
- Label: Mantra
- Producers: Dave Fridmann; Tony Doogan; The Delgados

The Delgados chronology
| The Great Eastern (2000) | Hate (2002) | Universal Audio (2004) |

Singles from Hate
- 1. "Coming in from the Cold" Released: 14 October 2002; 2. "All You Need Is Hate" Released: 17 February 2003

Hate is the fourth studio album by Scottish rock band the Delgados. It was first released on 14 October 2002 by Mantra Records. Following the release of their third studio album The Great Eastern, the band performed music during an art show by Joe Coleman. It served as the catalyst for their next album, giving vocalist and guitarist Alun Woodward the urge to write more honest material. Recording was mainly held at CaVa Sound Studios in Glasgow, Scotland, with Dave Fridmann, Tony Doogan, and the band as producers. Additional recording was done at Chem19 Studios, also in Glasgow, and at Tarbox Road Studios in Cassadaga, New York. Described as an orchestral pop album, Hate continued the sound of The Great Eastern.

Hate received generally favourable reviews from critics, some of whom found it to be an improvement on The Great Eastern. It charted at number 27 in Scotland, and number 57 in the United Kingdom. Its lead single "Coming in from the Cold" peaked at number 55 in Scotland, and number 82 in the UK. The second single, "All You Need Is Hate", charted at number 72 in the UK, and number 73 in Scotland. "Coming in from the Cold" was released on 14 October 2002, which was followed by two UK tours in late 2002 and early 2003. Hate was released in the United States in January 2003. "All You Need Is Hate" was released on 17 February 2003; the band embarked on a tour of the United States in April 2003, which was followed by another UK trek, and a stint in Europe with Doves.

== Background and production ==
The Delgados released their third studio album, The Great Eastern, in April 2000 through their own label Chemikal Underground. When making it, the band were unable to finish it initially. Vocalist and guitarist Alun Woodward felt the mixes sounded "hideous [...] flat and never went anywhere". Producer Dave Fridmann was brought in to re-work the material; the resulting album was full of strings and related orchestral instrumentation. It charted at number 72 in the UK, while its singles "American Trilogy" and "No Danger" peaked at number 61 and 77, respectively.

The catalyst for the Delgados' next album came from an art show by Joe Coleman that the band performed music for. His paintings centred on blood, violence and death, among other topics; Woodward said they showed life in its true form, "and they're difficult things". This gave him the "desire to be honest" when writing material for the band's upcoming album. A number of the tracks were not shaping up to the band's expectations, and were subsequently rewritten with piano. Fridmann was enlisted again, with Tony Doogan and the band, to produce Hate; it was mainly recorded at CaVa Sound Studios in Glasgow, Scotland by Doogan, with assistance from William of Deans and Michael Bannister.

Additional recording was done at Chem19 Studios, also in Glasgow, with Andy Miller, and at Tarbox Road Studios in Cassadaga, New York, with Fridmann. As Pollock was pregnant with her and drummer Paul Savage's child throughout the process, she was unable to do vocals, extending recording until March 2002. Fridmann, assisted by Michael Ivins, mixed the recordings at Tarbox. Bassist Stewart Henderson said the initial mixes were not to the band's liking; Fridmann was he was busy in Buffalo focusing on another job, which resulted in misunderstandings between him and the band. Pollock and Woodward flew to Fridmann, who promptly re-mixed the recordings, which were then mastered by Chris Blair at Abbey Road Studios in London.

== Composition ==
Musically, the sound of Hate has been described as orchestral pop, in the vein of The Great Eastern. It has been compared to the work of Throwing Muses and the Wedding Present, while its strings recalled the work of Godspeed You! Black Emperor. Discussing the album's title, Pollock said "some aspects of life have to do with [hate]. Like the struggles of people and the negative emotions in life". Woodward said the album centred around "a lot of negativity, but I think once you actually listen, these are songs which say, 'I’m an alright guy, but I’m a bit of a dickhead, right, and I can see that in myself'". Dominic Farr came up with the brass arrangements across the album. The band wrote the majority of the string arrangements; they collaborated with Malcolm Lindsay on "If This Is a Plan", while he solely did "The Drowning Years". Pollock said upon hearing his arrangements, the band "all kind of thought 'Wait a minute, it doesn't sound like anything that could fit in with the song'". Lindsay and the band wrote the choir arrangements for "The Light Before We Land" and "All Rise", while Lindsay solely arranged "Woke from Dreaming". In addition to the regular roles, the band members as a whole did programming, samples, and noises throughout the album. Fridmann played additional bass guitar on "Never Look at the Sun".

The album's opening track, "The Light Before We Land", is about a relationship turning stale. Its lavish strings and distorted backing track, topped off with Pollock's upbeat vocals, set the tone for the rest of the album. "All You Need Is Hate" deals with misanthropy; it title is a parody of "All You Need Is Love" (1967) by the Beatles. The song itself evoked the Beatles' "She's Leaving Home" (1967), and leans into R&B. "The Drowning Years" tackles the topic of schizophrenia and contemplating suicide. "Coming in from the Cold" lacks the orchestration found on most of the tracks in lieu of straightforward pop in the style of Coldplay and Travis. The almost seven-minute track "Child Killers" sees the music switch from a soft lullaby to funeral hymn to a symphony, and ending on trip hop. According to vocalist and guitarist Emma Pollock, it is a "tale about how dangerous it can be to bring up a child without love and affection because it can all turn upside down later on in life". A version of "Child Killers", along with "Never Look at the Sun", had been performed for Coleman's exhibition. "All Rise" is a retread of "Aye Today", a song from The Great Eastern. The album's closing track, "If This Is a Plan", was reminiscent of material heard on Radiohead's OK Computer (1997).

== Release ==
On 2 September 2002, Hate was announced for release the following month; its track listing was posted online the same day. "Coming in from the Cold" was released as the album's lead single on 14 October 2002. On the same day, Hate was released through Mantra Recordings. The band opted not to release it through Chemikal Underground due to not having the necessary funds, and were not willing to take support away from others acts on the label. At the time, Chemikal Underground were preparing to release albums by Cha Cha Cohen and Malcolm Middleton; Pollock said: "for the sake of [Hate ...] and to risk losing the label entirely, we didn't think it was a good idea to push it". Up to this point, Mantra had released the band's past releases in the United States. The cover features a child being held in their mother's arms. The Japanese edition includes "Coalman" and "Crutches" as extra tracks. Later in the same month, Woodward and Savage spent time DJing while on tour with the Polyphonic Spree.

The Delgados went on a three-week UK tour at end of 2002 supporting Doves, and then embarked on a headlining stint of their own in January and February 2003. To enhance the songs live, the band were accompanied by Barr on cello, Cross on violin, Lewis Turner on keyboards, and other individuals. Hate was released in the US on 21 January 2003, which included the bonus tracks "Coalman" and "Mad Drums", alongside the music video for "Coming in from the Cold". "All You Need Is Hate" was released the album's second single on 17 February 2003, with "Mad Drums" and a cover of "Mr. Blue Sky" (1977) by the Electric Light Orchestra as the B-sides. The band went on a trek to the US in April 2003, and another UK tour the following month, leading up to the benefit event Concern Concert for Africa. They embarked on a 30-date tour of Europe with Doves.

== Reception ==
Professional ratings
Aggregate scores
| Source | Rating |
|---|---|
| Metacritic | 80/100 |
Review scores
| Source | Rating |
| AllMusic | 4.5/5 stars |
| The Austin Chronicle | 4/5 stars |
| Drowned in Sound | 9/10 |
| Entertainment Weekly | A− |
| The Guardian | 4/5 stars |
| Los Angeles Times | 3/4 stars |
| Pitchfork | 8.1/10 |
| Q | 3/5 stars |
| Rolling Stone | 3/5 stars |
| Spin | 8/10 |

Hate was met with generally favourable reviews from music critics. At Metacritic, which assigns a normalized rating out of 100 to reviews from mainstream publications, the album received an average score of 80, based on 20 reviews. It has been compared to such other works as The Flaming Lips' The Soft Bulletin.

AllMusic reviewer Sean Carruthers wrote that while The Great Eastern is "a fairly gentle and tentative record in a lot of ways," Hate is "bigger and demands your attention. The good news is that it's one of those rare records that actually deserves all of the attention it demands". Michael Chamy of The Austin Chronicle found that Fridmann retained the strings from The Great Eastern, "but minimizes the proggy indulgences that bogged [it] down". Drowned in Sound's Gareth Dobson saw the album as "most definitely a step onwards from the fragmented, oft inspiring and occasionally beautiful" The Great Eastern. Entertainment Weekly writer Rob Brunner said Hate had the "wonderful signature symphonic psychedelia" of Fridmann, "and the songs are pretty nice, too".

Betty Clarke of The Guardian wrote that while Hate is a "lush album full of gorgeous melodies and lullaby voices," its lyrical topics "might keep you awake at night". The Boston Phoenix's Franklin Soults said the tracks "unvarying start-small-end-huge formula becomes numbing" after a while, and the "impressionistic lyrics rarely cohere as convincingly" as heard in "All You Need Is Hate".Los Angeles Times writer Kevin Bronson highlighted Fridmann's production style for adding "cinematic [...] flourishes" that made his past work memorable, "but it is restraint that makes the Delgados' tightrope act work". Rolling Stone reviewer Christian Hoard referred to the band as "the depressed cousins of The Flaming Lips". In a review for Spin, Andy Greenwald put it as follows: "Rougher than Belle and Sebastian and lovelier than Mogwai, the Delgados craft orchestral maneuvers in the dark that leave bruises". Pitchfork contributor Nitsuh Abebe echoed a similar statement, saying that "[s]ome great dramatic reckoning of hope and despair is going on" with the album's tracks.

Hate peaked at number 27 in Scotland, and number 57 in the UK. "Coming in from the Cold" charted at number 55 in Scotland, and number 82 in the UK. "All You Need Is Hate" charted at number 72 in the UK, and number 73 in Scotland. Playlouder ranked the album at number 14 on their list of the top 50 albums of 2002. Stylus included the album on their list of The Top 50 Albums of 2000–2005.

== Track listing ==
All songs written by the Delgados.

| No. | Title | Length |
|---|---|---|
| 1. | "The Light Before We Land" | 5:30 |
| 2. | "All You Need Is Hate" | 2:53 |
| 3. | "Woke from Dreaming" | 4:32 |
| 4. | "The Drowning Years" | 5:12 |
| 5. | "Coming in from the Cold" | 3:34 |
| 6. | "Child Killers" | 6:42 |
| 7. | "Favours" | 4:36 |
| 8. | "All Rise" | 4:43 |
| 9. | "Never Look at the Sun" | 5:23 |
| 10. | "If This Is a Plan" | 4:26 |
| Total length: | | 47:31 |

== Personnel ==
Personnel per booklet.

The Delgados

- Stewart Henderson – bass
- Emma Pollock – guitar, vocals
- Paul Savage – drums, percussion
- Alun Woodward – guitar, vocals

Additional musicians

- The Delgados – programming, other instruments, samples, noises, string arrangements (all except track 4), choir arrangements (tracks 1 and 8), choir (track 10)
- Capella Nova – choir
  - Rebecca Tavener – soprano
  - Libby Crabtree – soprano
  - Anne Lewis-Mezzo – soprano
  - Paul Rendall – tenor
  - Nicholas York-Jones – baritone
  - Noel Mann – bass
  - Alan Tavener – director
- Dominic Farr – trumpet, brass arrangements

Additional musicians (continued)

- James Woods – trumpet
- Chris Cruikshank – baritone saxophone
- Andrew Fraser – trombone
- Mark Traynor – trombone
- Denis Kane – trombone
- Greg Lawson – violin
- Vuk Krakovic – violin
- Charlie Cross – violin, viola
- Alan Barr – cello
- Diana Clark – double bass
- Camille Mason – flute
- Lauren Lambell – piano, keyboards
- Lewis Turner – piano, keyboards
- Dave Fridmann – additional bass guitar (track 9)
- Malcolm Lindsay – harp, string arrangements (tracks 4 and 11), choir arrangements (tracks 1, 3 and 8)

Production and design

- Joe Coleman – touch paper lit
- Dave Fridmann – producer, mixing, additional recording
- Tony Doogan – producer, recording
- The Delgados – producer
- William of Deans – assistant
- Michael Bannister – assistant
- Michael Ivins – assistant
- Andy Miller – additional recording
- Chris Blair – mastering
- James Luckett – photography

== Charts ==
Chart performance for Hate
| Chart (2002) | Peak position |
|---|---|
| Scottish Albums (Official Charts) | 27 |
| UK Albums (Official Charts) | 57 |
| UK Independent Albums (Official Charts) | 5 |
