= Peloton (album) =

Studio album by The Delgados
- Released: 8 June 1998
- Genre: Indie rock
- Label: Chemikal Underground
- Producer: The Delgados

The Delgados chronology
Domestiques (1996)	Peloton (1998)	The Great Eastern (2000)

Professional ratings
Review scores
Source	Rating
AllMusic	4/5 stars
The Encyclopedia of Popular Music	3/5 stars
Pitchfork	8.9/10

Peloton is the second album by the Delgados, released in 1998 on their own label, Chemikal Underground. The title refers to the large main group in a road bicycle race.

The album peaked at No. 56 on the UK Albums Chart.

== Critical reception ==
AllMusic called it "an eclectic offering that travels beyond the sphere of pop."

== Track listing ==
All songs by The Delgados.

1. "Everything Goes Around the Water"
2. "The Arcane Model"
3. "The Actress"
4. "Clarinet"
5. "Pull The Wires from the Wall"
6. "Repeat Failure"
7. "And So the Talking Stopped"
8. "Don't Stop"
9. "Blackpool"
10. "Russian Orthodox"
11. "The Weaker Argument Defeats the Stronger"

== Personnel ==
- Alun Woodward
- Emma Pollock
- Stewart Henderson
- Paul Savage

Featuring:

- Alan Barr, Jennifer Christie, Emily MacPherson - strings
- Camille Mason - flute, clarinet and piano
- Gregor Reid - percussion
- James Jarvie - black magic
- Adam Piggot - artwork design
