= Holy Mountain (band) =

Scottish psychedelic rock band

- Genres: Psychedelic rock
- Years active: 2008–present
- Label: Chemikal Underground Records
- Members: Andy McGlone; Pete Flett; Allan Stewart
- Website: www.holymountainband.co.uk

Holy Mountain is a psychedelic rock band from Glasgow, Scotland, comprising Andy McGlone (guitar and vocals), Pete Flett (drums) and Allan Stewart (Idlewild/Desalvo). The band is currently signed to Chemikal Underground Records.

== History ==
=== Formation ===
Andy McGlone and Pete Flett met in the Captains Rest in Glasgow, December 2008 and started the band as a two-piece. They were later joined by Allan Stewart in April 2010. They take their name from the 1973 film by Alejandro Jodorowsky.

=== Earth Measures (2008–2012) ===
Earth Measures was recorded in the Diving Bell Lounge, Glasgow in July 2010. The session was engineered by Marcus Mackay (Frightened Rabbit), mixed by Iain Cook (of Aereogramme, The Unwinding Hours, Chvrches), and mastered by Kenny MacLeod (Mogwai, Sons and Daughters).

Described by The List as a "cacophonous, riff-driven release imbued with savage axe-mastery and vintage spirit", the album was released on 7 May 2012 through Chemikal Underground. The album was met with positive reviews; Drowned in sound stating 'there's a depth and richness in the sound that lets so many other rock records down.', The Skinny describing the sound as "fuzz-faced bass-heavy ecstasy" and The Line of Best Fit described it as "teetering-on-the-edge-of-insanity reckless abandon". The band promoted the album with sessions with Marc Riley on BBC Radio 6 Music and Vic Galloway on BBC Radio Scotland, as well as festival appearances at Eurosonic, Bergenfest and local support slots with Shrinebuilder and The Twilight Sad.

=== Ancient Astronauts (2013–present) ===
The band entered Chem 19 recording studio in April 2013 and completed recording of their second album "Ancient Astronauts" with producer Paul Savage. The album also features Graeme Smillie (Emma Pollock, Unwinding Hours) on organ and keys. The album was mixed by Savage in December. The band released a 7" single, "Luftwizard" from the album, with a cover of Black Sabbath's "War Pigs" as the B-Side.

The album was released in the UK on 7 April 2014.

== Members ==
- Andy McGlone - guitar, vocals (2008 – present)
- Pete Flett - drums (2008 – present)
- Allan Stewart - bass (2010 – present)

== Discography ==
=== Studio albums ===
Year	Title
2012	Earth Measures: Released: 7 May 2012; Label: Chemikal Underground Records (CHEM 173); Formats: LP, CD, DL
2014	Ancient Astronauts: Released: 7 April 2014; Label: Chemikal Underground Records (CHEM 205); Formats: LP, CD, DL

=== Singles ===
Year	Title
2013	Luftwizard: Released: 18 October 2013; Label: Chemikal Underground Records (CHEM204); Formats: 7", DL
