= The Great Eastern (album) =

Studio album by The Delgados
- Released: 17 April 2000
- Studio: Cava Sound Workshops (Glasgow, Scotland); Chem19 (Glasgow, Scotland); Jaya Pura; Tarbox Road Studios (Cassadaga, New York)
- Genre: Indie rock
- Length: 46:10
- Label: Chemikal Underground
- Producer: Dave Fridmann; The Delgados

The Delgados chronology
Peloton (1998)	The Great Eastern (2000)	Hate (2002)

Singles from The Great Eastern
- 1. "American Trilogy" Released: 2000; 2. "No Danger" Released: 2000

The Great Eastern is the third studio album by Scottish indie rock band The Delgados. It was released on 17 April 2000 in the United Kingdom on their own Chemikal Underground record label, and later on 9 May 2000 in the United States.

The Great Eastern was their first album not to be named after a cycling theme – the title refers to a textile mill in Glasgow, latterly a hostel for the homeless.

== Reception ==
Professional ratings
Review scores
Source	Rating
AllMusic	4.5/5 stars
Alternative Press	4/5
The Independent	4/5 stars
Los Angeles Times	3.5/4 stars
Melody Maker	4.5/5 stars
NME	6/10
Pitchfork	5.7/10
Q	4/5 stars
Rolling Stone	3/5 stars
Select	4/5

At the end of 2000, The Great Eastern was listed among the year's best albums by Mojo, who ranked it fifth, and NME, who ranked it 28th. The album was nominated for the 2000 Mercury Prize.

In 2008, The Great Eastern was ranked at number 49 on Mojo's list of "The 50 Greatest UK Indie Records of All Time".

== Track listing ==
All tracks are written by The Delgados (Stewart Henderson, Emma Pollock, Paul Savage and Alun Woodward).

No.	Title	Length
1.	"The Past That Suits You Best"	6:21
2.	"Accused of Stealing"	5:42
3.	"American Trilogy"	4:46
4.	"Reasons for Silence (Ed's Song)"	3:28
5.	"Thirteen Gliding Principles"	3:44
6.	"No Danger"	6:32
7.	"Aye Today"	4:55
8.	"Witness"	4:04
9.	"Knowing When to Run"	3:26
10.	"Make Your Move"	3:12
Total length:		46:10

== Personnel ==
Credits for The Great Eastern adapted from album liner notes.

The Delgados

- Stewart Henderson – bass guitar, accordion, autoharp, guitar, handclaps, piano, Rhodes piano, sleigh bells, vocals
- Emma Pollock – guitar, vocals, handclaps, vibraphone
- Paul Savage – drums, dulcimer, guitar, Hammond organ, handclaps, keyboards, Korg synthesizer, piano, Rhodes piano, sampler, tubular bells
- Alun Woodward – guitar, vocals, bowed guitar, dulcimer, e-bow, keyboards, slide guitar, vibraphone
- The Delgados – writing, brass arrangement, string arrangement, woodwind arrangement

Additional musicians

- Alan Barr – cello, string arrangement
- Barry Burns – Hammond organ, Korg synthesizer, piano, Rhodes piano
- Lorne Cowieson – trumpet, flugelhorn, brass arrangement
- Charlie Cross – viola, violin, string arrangement
- Graham Flett – double bass
- Dave Fridmann – cello sampling, weights
- David Laing – violin
- Greg Lawson – violin, string arrangement
- Camille Mason – clarinet, flute, piano, woodwind arrangement
- Guy Milford – tenor horn
- Jim Putnam – additional vocals
- Paul Stone – euphonium, trombone
- Graeme Wilson – saxophone

Production

- The Delgados – production, recording
- Tony Doogan – recording
- Dave Fridmann – mixing, production
- James Jarvie – "black magic"
- Chris Renwick – programming
- Dougie Summers – programming

Artwork and design

- Tony Doogan – camcorder
- Adam Piggot – artwork, photography
- Lindsay Savage – cover photography

== Charts ==
Chart (2000)	Peak position
Scottish Albums (OCC)	31
UK Albums (OCC)	72
UK Independent Albums (OCC)	12
