= We Are All Sluts of Trust =

We are all Sluts of Trust

Studio album by Sluts of Trust
- Released: 26 April 2004
- Recorded: 2003–2004
- Studio: Chem19 Studios, Hamilton, Scotland
- Genre: Indie rock
- Length: 37:25
- Label: Chemikal Underground
- Producer: Sluts of Trust, Paul Savage

We Are All Sluts of Trust is the debut album from Scottish rock duo Sluts of Trust. It was released in Europe on 26 April on Chemikal Underground Records and the US in May 2004 via the New York-based Megaforce Records. The album was recorded between 2003 and 2004 at the Chem19 studio in Hamilton and produced by Paul Savage of The Delgados. It includes the lead tracks from their earlier two singles, "Piece O' You" and "Leave You Wanting More".

The cover art is Thomas Barwick's The Jagged Orbit.

== Critical reception ==
Professional ratings
Review scores
Source	Rating
Daily Record	5/5 stars
The Observer	(favourable)
PopMatters	(favourable)
The Times	3/5 stars
UNCUT	4/5 stars

The album received very positive reviews, but modest sales, selling up to 10,000 copies worldwide. It was named 'Album of the Week' by the Daily Record, who said that the album "has a raw appeal and invites the listener into their inner sanctum and then ravishes them with raucous ferocity". Tim O'Neil of PopMatters said of the album: "This album rocks hard, of that there is no doubt. The Sluts are as exciting and fierce a group as I've heard in quite some time". He went on to state "I almost don't believe that the Sluts are merely two guys who've only been playing together for a year. It simply defies belief that they could learn to rock so hard in such a brief amount of time". UNCUT called it "a raw, often very rude post-hardcore racket, driven by an intelligence that embraces Fugazi, ...Trail Of Dead and Queens Of The Stone Age". The Observer commented that the "archly entertaining Glaswegians subvert the Scottish stereotype of dour indie mopers with hot, filthy guitars and unhinged vocals". Amber Cowan of The Times described the album as "adventurous, agitated erocktica, informed by the angular clang of post-punk", giving the album three starts out of five.

== Track listing ==
All songs written by John McFarlane.

1. "That's Right...That Cat's Right"
2. "Piece O' You"
3. "Tighter Than the Night"
4. "Leave You Wanting More"
5. "Let's..."
6. "The Continuing Struggle Between The Dirty And The Smooth Starring Admiral Flannel And The Duke Of Blag"
7. "Greatest Gift"
8. "Dominoes"
9. "Meanwhile in Rocksville"
10. "Pirate Weekend"

== Personnel ==
- John McFarlane – guitar, vocals, electric piano
- Anthony O'Donnell – drums, sound effects
