= Martin John Henry =

Scottish songwriter

- Origin: Bellshill, Scotland
- Genre: Indie rock
- Instruments: Vocals, guitar, organ, keyboard, accordion
- Years active: 2004–present
- Labels: Gargleblast Records; Rock Action Records
- Website: martinjohnhenry.bandcamp.com

Martin John Henry is a songwriter from Bellshill in Lanarkshire, Scotland. Henry is noted for his success as the frontman of the rock band De Rosa, who released several albums, singles and other recordings on Glasgow’s influential independent label Chemikal Underground. De Rosa's music has been critically lauded and championed by John Peel and Steve Lamacq. Sound-Scotland recently praised Henry as "...one of Scotland's finest songwriters" Henry has written, recorded and played with many of Scotland’s finest musicians, including Barry Burns (Mogwai), Robert Johnston (Life Without Buildings), King Creosote and Malcolm Middleton. As a solo artist, Henry contributed a track to MOJO Magazine’s ‘Abbey Road Now!’ CD in October 2009 and has played numerous shows including SOUNDS Festival, Tigerfest and Glasgow’s Merchant City Festival.

== Career ==
After the 2009 release of De Rosa (band)'s second album Prevention (album), Henry's solo album The Other Half of Everything was released in the UK on 10 October 2011 on Gargleblast Records. The Glasgow Herald praised it for the "pop pulse" mixed in with the more left field elements, and compared him to Arab Strap, King Creosote, and Twilight Sad. The List gave it 4/5, calling it "impressive" and "thoughtful". The Skinny called it "marvellous stuff", praising both the songwriting and the touches of electronica. Journalist and critic Andrew Collins named it number 27 in his best albums of 2011.

After his album, Henry released Live On Land EP. A collection of live recordings from Henry's European acoustic tour, it was recorded over a number of performances in September 2012. As the quality varies, it was only ever released as a "Pay what you like" downloaded on Henry's bandcamp page.

In 2015, Henry released On The Forest Floor as a collaboration with Gillian Fleetwood (State Broadcasters), under the guise of Henry & Fleetwood. The EP consists of four tracks. The EP received positive reviews, with Get Around Glasgow noting they are "...two fantastic vocalists, who also happen to be rather handy at making simple yet moving music"

== Discography ==
=== Studio albums ===
- "The Other Half of Everything" (2011)

=== Singles and EPs ===
- "Live On Land EP" (2012)

=== Other Releases ===
- "On The Forest Floor" Henry & Fleetwood (2015)
