= The Fruit Tree Foundation =

2010–2011 Scottish musical project

- Origin: Scotland
- Genres: Indie rock, folk
- Years active: 2010–2011
- Label: Chemikal Underground
- Past members: Rod Jones; Emma Pollock; Scott Hutchison; James Graham; Karine Polwart; Jill O'Sullivan; Jenny Reeve; Alasdair Roberts; Jonny Scott; James Yorkston; Graeme Smillie

The Fruit Tree Foundation was a Scottish musical project founded by Idlewild guitarist Rod Jones and former Delgados vocalist and guitarist Emma Pollock in 2010. Created in conjunction with the Mental Health Foundation, the project's overall aim is to "raise awareness of mental health and challenge perceptions of mental health problems by creating great art."

To date, the project has organised a number of live concerts, and released one studio album, First Edition (2011), featuring contributions from a number of notable Scottish musicians including members of Frightened Rabbit, The Twilight Sad, Sparrow and the Workshop and Take a Worm for a Walk Week, alongside Karine Polwart, Alasdair Roberts and James Yorkston.

== History ==
=== Beginnings (2008–2009) ===
In both 2008 and 2009, Idlewild guitarist Rod Jones and former Delgados vocalist Emma Pollock curated concerts for Scottish Mental Health Arts & Film Festival, titled, 'Music Like a Vitamin'. The concerts featured notable Scottish indie acts; Frightened Rabbit, The Twilight Sad, Sons and Daughters and Attic Lights, alongside folk musicians; Karine Polwart, James Yorkston and Alasdair Roberts. Regarding the shows, Pollock noted, "They were great gigs, with huge attendance as we always kept the ticket prices so low."

=== First Edition and mentoring scheme (2010–2011) ===
Prior to 2009's 'Music Like a Vitamin', Jones suggested that a full-length album featuring contributions from performers could be a possibility, noting, "The main idea is to have a more songwriter based project which will culminate in a record and then concerts as part of the festival. Something to keep people involved and talking about these things inbetween festivals. [...] There is a set idea now, and a plan, but I'm just awaiting the right funding. I think the main thing is to keep momentum so that we're not backtracking every year when we start a new festival."

In 2010, the project became known as The Fruit Tree Foundation, with a post on the project's website stating: "Since 2008 the music events of the Scottish Mental Health Arts & Film Festival, programmed under the banner 'Music Like A Vitamin', have grown in size and popularity. To build on this success and raise further awareness of the work of the Mental Health Foundation, we decided during early 2010 to go one step further and as well as organise the shows, create some new music to play at those shows too. It seemed natural that creating new music should be our way of getting further involved and getting people thinking and talking even more." The project is supported by Breathing Space Scotland.

Musicians gathered in a house in Perthshire, for five days to write material which would become First Edition. Pollock noted, "We started putting our ideas together mid-2009, ready to go into the house in early 2010."

To coincide with the album's release, there were two "launch gigs," with Jones noting, "I think the nerves and tension combined with the camaraderie that had been built through the process of writing and recording made for really special couple of evenings." First Edition was subsequently released on Chemikal Underground records.

In 2011, the Foundation introduced a mentoring scheme for young musicians, entitled 'New Branch', with Jones noting, "We got 170 applicants within a week, which was amazing. I listened to them all but had to be very objective and think about the bigger picture, being very aware of my grumpy old man tastes."

=== Future ===
Regarding The Fruit Tree Foundation's future, Jones noted, "I don't want to limit The Fruit Tree Foundation project to being just another indie project. It's supposed to include everybody, so just because I don't listen to Shania Twain or whatever, there's no reason we shouldn't have people who sound like that in the project."

== Discography ==
- First Edition (2011)
