= Domestiques =

Studio album by The Delgados
- Released: 28 October 1996
- Recorded: MCM Studios, 1996
- Genre: Indie rock
- Length: 39:26
- Label: Chemikal Underground
- Producer: The Delgados

The Delgados chronology
Domestiques (1996)	Peloton (1998)

Professional ratings
Review scores
Source	Rating
AllMusic	4/5 stars
Pitchfork Media	6.9/10

Domestiques is the Delgados' debut album. It was released on their own label, Chemikal Underground, on 28 October 1996. The title (literally "servants" in French) is a reference to the support team for the team leader in road bicycle racing.

== Track listing ==
All songs by The Delgados

1. "Under Canvas Under Wraps" – 2:40
2. "Leaning on a Cane" – 2:56
3. "Strathcona Slung" – 3:29
4. "Tempered; Not Tamed" – 3:48
5. "One More Question" – :55
6. "Big Business in Europe" – 2:36
7. "Falling and Landing" – 3:22
8. "Akumulator" – 3:20
9. "Sucrose" – 3:23
10. "Pinky" – 3:44
11. "Friendly Conventions" – 2:06
12. "Smaller Mammals" – 1:43
13. "4th Channel" – 2:32
14. "D'Estus Morte" – 2:52

== Personnel ==
- Alun Woodward – vocals, guitar
- Emma Pollock – vocals, guitar
- Stewart Henderson – bass guitar
- Paul Savage – drums
- Alan Barr – string arrangements
- The Delgados – producer, engineer, string arrangements
- Van Impe – artwork, art direction
