= Ballads of the Book =

Studio album by Various Artists
- Released: 5 March 2007
- Genre: Folk, rock
- Label: Chemikal Underground
- Producer: Paul Savage, Andy Miller

Ballads of the Book
Review scores
| Source | Rating |
|---|---|
| NME | 2.5/5 stars |
| Popmatters | 7/10 stars |

Ballads of the Book is a collaborative studio album, released on 5 March 2007, on Chemikal Underground. The project was curated by Idlewild lead vocalist Roddy Woomble, and features collaborations between Scottish musicians and Scottish writers. The album is considered a "joint effort" by all those involved. Ballads of the Book was produced at Chem19 studios by Paul Savage and Andy Miller.

== Artwork ==
The album's front cover was designed by Scottish author/artist Alasdair Gray, and painted by Richard Todd. The cover states that it is "for Edwin Morgan."

The album's liner notes include each of the poems in full.

== Track listing ==
1. "Song For Irena" – Mike Heron & John Burnside
2. "Steam Comes Off Our House" – De Rosa & Michel Faber
3. "A Calvinist Narrowly Avoids Pleasure" – James Yorkston & Bill Duncan
4. "Dreamcatcher" – Foxface & Rody Gorman
5. "A Sentimental Song" – Lord Cut-Glass & Alasdair Gray
6. "The Sixth Stone" – Aidan Moffat & Ian Rankin
7. "Girl" – Norman Blake & John Burnside
8. "The Good Years" – Karine Polwart & Edwin Morgan
9. "The War on Love Song" – Sons and Daughters & A. L. Kennedy
10. "The Leaving" – Alasdair Roberts & Robin Robertson
11. "Message in a Bottle" – Strike the Colours & Rody Gorman
12. "If You Love Me You'd Destroy Me" – Aereogramme & Hal Duncan
13. "The Rebel on His Own Tonight" – Malcolm Middleton & Alan Bissett
14. "Half An Apple" – Trashcan Sinatras & Ali Smith
15. "The Fire" – Vashti Bunyan & Rodge Glass
16. "Where And When" – King Creosote & Laura Hird
17. "Jesus on the Cross" – Emma Pollock & Louise Welsh
18. "The Weight of Years" – Idlewild & Edwin Morgan
