= Don't Make Me Wait =

Don't Make Me Wait may refer to:

- "Don't Make Me Wait" (911 song), 1996
- "Don't Make Me Wait" (LeToya Luckett song), 2014
- "Don't Make Me Wait" (Peech Boys song), 1982
- "Don't Make Me Wait", a 1988 song by Bomb the Bass
- "Don't Make Me Wait", a 1995 song by Eternal from Power of a Woman
- "Don't Make Me Wait", a 1984 song by Sammy Hagar from VOA
- "Don't Make Me Wait", a 1989 song by Jermaine Jackson from Don't Take It Personal
- Don't Make Me Wait, a 2007 album by Locksley, or its title track
- "Don't Make Me Wait", a 2003 song by Seal from Seal
- "Don't Make Me Wait", a 2010 song by Jazmine Sullivan from Love Me Back
- "Don't Make Me Wait", a 2016 song by Emma Pollock from In Search of Harperfield
- "Don't Make Me Wait", a 2018 song by Sting and Shaggy from 44/876

== See also ==
- "Don't Make Me Wait for Love", a song by Kenny G and Michael Bolton
- "Don't Make Me Wait Too Long", a 1980 song by Roberta Flack from Roberta Flack Featuring Donny Hathaway
