= Dark Skies =

Dark Skies may refer to:

- Dark Skies (1929 film), an American drama film directed by Harry S. Webb
- Dark Skies (2013 film), an American science fiction horror film
- Dark Skies (album), a 2018 album by Fit for a King
- Dark Skies (TV series), an American 1990s television series
- "Dark Skies", a track from the soundtrack of Metal Gear Rising: Revengeance
- "Dark Skies", a 2016 song by Emma Pollock from In Search of Harperfield

== See also ==
- DarkSky International, a dark skies environmental group
- "Dark Sky", a song by Jimmy Somerville
- Dark Sky (app), a smartphone app providing weather reports bought by Apple Inc. in 2020
- Dark Sky Distance, a professional running group
- Dark-sky movement, a campaign to reduce light pollution
- Dark-sky preserve, areas protected for naturally dark night skies
- Nighttime
- Olbers' paradox, the "dark sky at night" paradox
- Overcast
- Solar eclipse
