= Universal Audio =

Universal Audio may refer to:

- Universal Audio (company), an audio product company founded in 1958 by Bill Putnam Sr., and refounded by Jim Putnam and Bill Putnam Jr. in 1999.
- Universal Audio (album), a 2004 album by the Delgados
- Universal Audio Architecture, an initiative by Microsoft

== See also ==
- Universal Recording Corporation, former recording studio in Chicago founded by Bill Putnam, Sr.
- United Western Recorders, Hollywood independent recording studios in the 1960s
