= Conquering Animal Sound =

Scottish electronic music duo

- Origin: Glasgow, Scotland
- Genres: Electronic
- Years active: 2008–present
- Labels: Chemikal Underground Gizeh Records Gerry Loves Records
- Members: Anneke Kampman; James Scott
- Website: http://www.conqueringanimalsound.co.uk

Conquering Animal Sound is a Glasgow-based electronic duo consisting of Anneke Kampman (vocals/music) and James Scott (music). The band's debut album Kammerspiel was released in February 2011 on Gizeh Records, and their sophomore "On Floating Bodies" on Chemikal Underground in March 2013.

== Early history (2008–2010) ==
Kampman and Scott met at university in Edinburgh, and began collaborating in 2008. Taking their name from an article about the Conquering Lion sound-system group, they released a free mixtape titled "Your Friends, Conquering Animal Sound" on download and cassette, and began gigging around Scotland. In 2010 they were approached by new label Gerry Loves Records, and released their debut single "Giant" on 7" and download.

== Kammerspiel (2011) ==
Gizeh Records released their debut album Kammerspiel, which The Skinny called "a remarkable unveiling ... the organic and the electronic coexisting beautifully". The Line of Best Fit heralded it "one of the most accomplished debuts 2011 will see", and Drowned In Sound praised Kammerspiel's depth, as it "simultaneously managed to capture on record the full depth of their creativity and imagination, as well as the inherent beauty of their sound".

The album was recorded and mixed entirely by the band in Kampman's flat, and she discussed this lo-fi approach, which informed the album's title, in an article with the Skinny.

I had the word Kammerspiel in mind for a long time. I saw that there was a comparison to be drawn between the way those Kammerspielfilm films were made and what occurred within them, and Conquering Animal Sound's approach to music making. I imagine a lot of different facial expressions within our songs, similar to the way narrative was conveyed in Kammerspiel films. I think there’s an intimacy to our music, which is probably a consequence of the fact that it has been made by two people together in one space.

Kammerspiel was shortlisted for the inaugural Scottish Album of the Year Award, ultimately losing out to Bill Wells and Aidan Moffat's Everything's Getting Older.

== On Floating Bodies (2013) ==
The success of Kammerspiel interested Glasgow's Chemikal Underground label, and the band went into the label's Chem 19 studios to mix their second album "On Floating Bodies" with Paul Savage. The album was preceded by the single "The Future Does Not Require", and was released on the Chemikal Underground label in March 2013. The List (magazine) praised the album's "daring and gloriously rich palette", and included it in their Top Ten Albums of 2013. The album takes its title from Archimedes’ treatise on hydrostatics, and Mike Diver wrote for the BBC that the album is "not always comfortable, but consistently engaging ... persist and there’s real beauty to be found in its digitised designs". The Herald (Glasgow) called it "cosmic, disorientating and sublime", and in an article with the paper, the band discussed their writing processes.

Rather than having the lyrics or the melody and writing everything down, we write everything up – we create a sound we like and just see where it goes. We work up from the stuff that other people might use ornamentally – that’s the seed that starts the song for us. So on The Future Does Not Require, we started by sampling a note on Anneke’s flute, and then using that as a keyboard sound, and then making it a bit more unrecognisable. It’s about using different things and subverting them in the process.

== Discography ==
=== Studio albums ===
- Kammerspiel (2011)
- On Floating Bodies (2013)

=== Singles ===
- "Giant" (2010)
- "Bear" (2010)
- "The Future Does Not Require" (2013)
- "Warn Me" (2013)

=== EPs ===
- Your Friends, Conquering Animal Sound (2009)
- Tracer EP (2011)
- Talking Shapes (2014)
