= Andy Miller (music producer) =

Scottish record producer

Andy Miller is a Scottish record producer based in Hamilton, Lanarkshire, Scotland. Miller is noted for his production on albums by Mogwai, Life Without Buildings, Arab Strap, The Delgados, Scout Niblett, Songs: Ohia, Sons And Daughters, De Rosa and Desert Hearts.

He is freelance, he now works at Gargleblast Studio in Hamilton, but has mainly worked at Chem19 studios over the last ten years.

Having recorded many early tracks by seminal Scottish post-rock band Mogwai in the mid-1990s, he has now recorded their album The Hawk Is Howling, which was released in September 2008.

In 2003, Miller co-founded the Lanarkshire-based independent record label, Gargleblast Records. Founded by Miller and friend Shaun Tallamy in May that year, the aim of the label was to support, develop and release music by some of the bands Miller had recorded at Chem Nineteen Studios. Gargleblast's first release was "Gravitas" a/a "Hammer and Frogs", a limited edition 7" single by Belfast band Desert Hearts on 20 July 2004, followed by "Camera" a/a "All Saints Day" by local band De Rosa on 9 August.

== Recorded in full by Miller ==
- Songs: Ohia — The Lioness - Album (2000)
- Eska — Invent The Fortune - Album (2000)
- Life Without Buildings — Any Other City - Album (2001)
- Scout Niblett — Sweetheart Fever - Album (2001)
- The Dudley Corporation — The Lonely World Of The Dudley Corporation - Album (2001)
- Tacoma Radar — And No One Waved Goodbye - Album (2002)
- Desert Hearts — Let's Get Worse - Album (2002)
- Scout Niblett — I Conjure Series - Mini Album (2003)
- Corrigan — How To Hang Off A Rope - Album (2003)
- James Orr Complex — Chori's Bundle (Engineered by Andy Miller, Produced by Kenney MacLeod) - Album (2003)
- The Dudley Corporation — In Love With The Dudley Corporation - Album (2003)
- Sons And Daughters — Love The Cup - Album (2004)
- Fuck Off Machete — My First Machete - Album (2004)
- Desert Hearts — Hotsy Totsy Nagasaki - Album (2006)
- De Rosa — Mend - Album (2006)
- Fuck Off Machete — If Gold Was Silver and Silver Was Gold - Album (2006)
- My Latest Novel — Wolves - Album (2006)
- Foxface — This Is What Makes Us - Album (2007)
- Sooth — Six Month's On - EP (2007)
- Mogwai — The Hawk Is Howling (2008)
- Kid Canaveral — "Couldn't Dance" - Single (2008), "Second Time Around" - Single (2008), "I Don't Have the Heart for This" - Single (2008)
- De Rosa — Prevention (2009)
- Le Reno Amps — Tear It Open (2009)
- Shutter — "Pillars" (2010)
- Martin John Henry — The Other Half of Everything (2011)
- Shrag—"Canines" (2012)
- The Deadly Winters—"Raise the Coin" (2012)
- Me After You — Foughts (2013)
- Michael Timmons — Bone Coloured (2018)
- Deer Leader — We've Met Before. Haven't We. (2021)
- Michael Timmons — The Lightness of the Dread (2022)

== Recorded in part by Miller ==
- Mogwai — 4 Satin - EP (1997)
- Mogwai — Young Team - Album (1997)
- Mogwai — No Education = No Future (Fuck the Curfew) - EP (1998)
- Mogwai — Ten Rapid - Album (2000)
- Arab Strap — The Red Thread - Album (2001)
- The Delgados — Hate - Album (2003)
- The Fratellis — The Fratellis EP - EP (2006)
- Le Reno Amps — So For Your Thrills... - Album (2007)
- Various — Ballads Of The Book - Album (2007)

== Other recorded works ==
- Life Without Buildings — "Love Trinity" - Single (2001)
- Desert Hearts — "Gravitas" / "Hammer And Frogs" - Single (2004)
- De Rosa — "Camera" / "All Saints Day" - Single (2004)

== Gargleblast discography ==
Title	Release date	Cat No	Format
Desert Hearts - "Gravitas" a/a "Hammer and Frogs"	20 July 2004	GARGLE001	7" Vinyl Single
De Rosa - "Camera" a/a "All Saints Day"	9 August 2004	GARGLE002	7" Vinyl Single
Emer - "Windows Close" a/a "Speed Of Dark"	3 October 2005	GARGLE003	7" Vinyl Single
De Rosa - "Mend"	19 June 2006	CHEM089	CD Album (licensed to Chemikal Underground Records)
Desert Hearts - "Hotsy Totsy Nagasaki"	30 October 2006	GARGLE004CD	CD Album, Digital Download
Life Without Buildings - "Live At The Annandale Hotel"	11 June 2007	GARGLE005CD	CD Album, Digital Download
Foxface - "This Is What Makes Us"	5 November 2007	GARGLE006CD	CD Album, Digital Download
Michael Timmons - "Bone Coloured"	23 February 2018	GARGLE00016	Digital Download
Michael Timmons - "The Lightness of the Dread"	27 January 2012	GARGLE00022	Digital Download

== Bibliography ==
- Hamilton Harvey, 2005. Franz Ferdinand: And the Pop Renaissance. Reynolds & Hearn, ISBN 978-1-905287-00-0.
