= Prevention (album) =

Studio album by De Rosa
- Released: 2 March 2009
- Recorded: Chem 19; Blantyre, Scotland; 2007–08
- Genre: Indie rock, psychedelic folk, indie folk, psychedelic rock
- Label: Chemikal Underground; Gargleblast Records
- Producer: Andy Miller

De Rosa chronology
Mend (2006)	Prevention (2009)	Weem (2016)

Professional ratings
Review scores
Source	Rating
The Independent	4/5 stars
The List	4/5 stars
Mojo	4/5 stars
Rock Sound	8/10 stars
Scotland on Sunday	5/5 stars
The Skinny	4/5 stars
Strangeglue	8/10 link

Prevention is the second studio album by Scottish indie rock band De Rosa, released on 2 March 2009 on both Chemikal Underground and Gargleblast Records. Regarding the album, guitarist Chris Connick stated that the album features "ten tracks of misery and place, from Lanarkshire," and noted that it "differ[ed] sonically from Mend quite a bit. The songs are more layered, and we used a lot more electronics and beats on this album. There’s also more emphasis on the album's coherence as a whole, and I think it plays better as a collection of songs than Mend did."

Vocalist and guitarist Martin Henry stated that: "the scratchy, falling-apart sound of parts of Mend frustrates me sometimes, so with Prevention I wanted to make something that was prettier and heavier at the same time. We were more interested in layers of vocals and instruments, with an emphasis on percussion, not just guitar. There are definitely a lot more keyboards on this one too.

The band worked with producer Andy Miller at Chem 19 recording studios in Lanarkshire, Scotland. Guest musicians on the album include Barry Burns of Mogwai and Robert Johnston of Life Without Buildings.

== Artwork ==
The album's front cover features artwork by Glasgow writer and artist Alasdair Gray. Guitarist Chris Connick notes that:

Our friend Sorcha Dallas (and wife-to-be of Robert Johnson from Life Without Buildings, who played on our album) is an art dealer and gallery owner based in Glasgow. She helped put us in touch with Alasdair regards the cover art. Being a huge fan of Alasdair’s writing and in particular books such as Lanark and 1982, Janine, I was really excited and a bit scared when the sittings for the portrait came around. It was really cool to meet Alasdair and he turned out to be a lovely and engaging man, so I can thoroughly dismiss the adage "Never meet your heroes" as absolute bollocks.

Vocalist and guitarist Marin Henry notes that:

The portraits were painted first, then there was the idea of a table with some meaningful objects. The map and the copy of Mend came from Alasdair a little later on and I remembered there being an old map lying about Chem19, where we recorded the album. The guitar in the image is my little acoustic. I write all of the De Rosa demos on it.

== Track listing ==
Lyrics by Martin John Henry. Music by De Rosa.

1. A Love Economy
2. Nocturne For An Absentee
3. It Helps To See You Hurt
4. Pest
5. Stillness
6. Under The Stairs
7. In Code
8. Swell
9. Flight Recorder
10. Tinto

== Personnel ==
- Martin John Henry – vocals, guitars, organ, vibraphone, accordion, programming
- James Woodside – bass, mandolin, melodica
- Neil Woodside – drums, percussion, glockenspiel
- Chris Connick – guitars, synthesisers, piano, hammer dulcimer
- Andrew Bush – piano, guitar, synthesisers, melodica, vibraphone
- Alan Barr – cello
- Robert Johnston – additional guitar
- Barry Burns – piano, organ, synthesisers
- Andy Miller – producer
- Kenny MacLeod – mastering

The album also features choir vocals performed by a group of friends and family members of De Rosa.
