= Craig B =

Craig B may refer to:

- Craig B., Glaswegian musician, former member of indie rock bands Aereogramme and The Unwinding Hours and solo artist known as A Mote of Dust
- Craig B, member of the Hip hop, Rap & R&B remix production team The Medicine Men
