= Jill O'Sullivan =

- Also known as: Jill Lorean
- Born: Belfast, Northern Ireland
- Genres: Alternative rock; art rock; indie rock; folk rock; avant-rock
- Instruments: Vocals; Guitar; Violin
- Years active: 2003–present
- Website: www.jilllorean.net

Jill O'Sullivan is a multi-instrumentalist, singer and songwriter who grew up in Chicago and is based in Glasgow, Scotland. Currently performing as Jill Lorean, O'Sullivan has been a member of bands Sparrow and the Workshop, Bdy_Prts and Three Queens in Mourning, as well as contributing to records by Frightened Rabbit, James Yorkston, Roddy Woomble, Broken Chanter, The Grand Gestures, The Fruit Tree Foundation and the Gral Brothers.

== Career ==
O'Sullivan moved to London in 2005 to pursue a master's degree in sociology, completing her studies in Glasgow in 2007, where she soon after formed Sparrow and the Workshop with Nick Packer and Gregor Donaldson. The trio were signed to a label, Distiller Records, and released two EP's and three albums over the course of 6 years. After releasing their third album, Murderopolis, in 2013, the band took a break and O'Sullivan formed an alt pop duo with Jenny Reeve and, with the help of drummer Johnny Scott, released the album Fly, Invisible Hero in 2017. O'Sullivan's latest project, Jill Lorean, is a collaboration between O'Sullivan and musician/producer Andy Monaghan and drummer Peter Kelly and has so far resulted in one 6-track EP, Not Your First (2020), and a full album, This Rock (2022).

O'Sullivan has also released a collaborative album with renowned musicians Alasdair Roberts, Alex Neilson and Bonnie "Prince" Billy under the moniker Three Queens in Mourning (2020). In addition, she collaborated with Sean Cumming (John Knox Sex Club) on storytelling project Do the Gods Speak Esperanto, released in 2017. Over the years O'Sullivan has also worked with Scott Hutchison, Emma Pollock and James Yorkston amongst others, and toured with the likes of The Pogues and The Brian Jonestown Massacre. O'Sullivan has been playlisted on BBC6 Music, BBC Radio 1 and FM4, and has partaken in sessions for Lauren Laverne, Marc Riley and Maida Vale. She has performed at various festivals, including Glastonbury, Bestival, Hop Farm Festival, End of the Road, Green Man, London Calling and T in the Park.

== Selected discography ==
=== Albums / EPs ===
- Bastard Mountain - Farewell, Bastard Mountain, 2014
- Do the Gods Speak Esperanto - Lotus Eaters, 2017
- Bdy_Prts - Fly, Invisible Hero, 2017
- Three Queens in Mourning - Hello Sorrow, Hello Joy, 2020
- Jill Lorean - Not Your First, 2020
- Jill Lorean - This Rock, 2022
- Jill Lorean - Peace Cult, 2024

=== Appears on ===
- Patrick Watson - "Mary", 2003 (Violin)
- Low Skies - "All The Love I Could Find", 2006 (Violin)
- Fruit Tree Foundation - "First Edition", 2010 (Co-Write, Guitar)
- Broken Records - "Dia Dos Namorados", 2010 (Vocals)
- John Knox Sex Club - "Kiss the Dirt", 2011 (Vocals)
- Roddy Woomble - "The Impossible Song and Other Songs", 2011 (Vocals)
- The Grand Gestures - "There's No Place Like Home", 2012 (Vocals)
- The Grand Gestures - "Deer in a Crosshair", 2012 (Vocals)
- James Yorkston - Just as Scared", 2012 (Co-wrote, Vocals)
- From Scotland With Love - "Film", 2014 (Vocals)
- Frightened Rabbit - "Rained On", 2017 (Vocals)
- BrewBand - "Brewband", 2018 (Violin, Vocals, Guitar)
- Broken Chanter - "Broken Chanter", 2019 (Vocals, Violin)
- Gral Brothers - "Caravan East", 2020 (Violin)
- Alex Rex - "Andromeda"", 2020 (Vocals, Violin)
- Broken Chanter - Catastrophe Hits, 2021 (Vocals, Violin)
