= Mend (album) =

Studio album by De Rosa
- Released: June 2006
- Recorded: Chem 19; Hamilton, Scotland; 2004-05
- Genre: Psychedelic rock, psychedelic folk
- Length: 36:32
- Label: Chemikal Underground / Gargleblast
- Producer: Andy Miller

De Rosa chronology
Mend (2006)	Prevention (2009)

Professional ratings
Review scores
Source	Rating
Gigwise	link

Mend is the debut album by the Scottish band De Rosa. Released in June 2006, it was voted 16th in Mojo’s top 50 albums of 2006. It was recorded by Scottish producer Andy Miller.

== Track listing ==
1. Father’s Eyes – 3:26
2. Camera – 2:50
3. New Lanark – 3:45
4. All Saints Day – 2:55
5. Hopes & Little Jokes – 2:14
6. Cathkin Braes – 4:42
7. On Recollection – 2:54
8. Evelyn – 3:57
9. Hattonrigg Pit Disaster – 2:19
10. Headfirst – 2:44
11. The Engineer – 4:46

Lyrics by Martin John Henry. Music by De Rosa.

== Personnel ==
- Martin John Henry – vocals, guitars, keyboards
- James Woodside – bass, mandolin, melodica
- Neil Woodside – drums, percussion

== Guests ==
- Alan Barr – cello on Evelyn, Hattonrigg Pit Disaster and The Engineer
- Chris Connick – additional writing on Evelyn
- Ross McGowan – additional writing on Cathkin Braes
