= Sparrow and the Workshop =

Scottish rock band

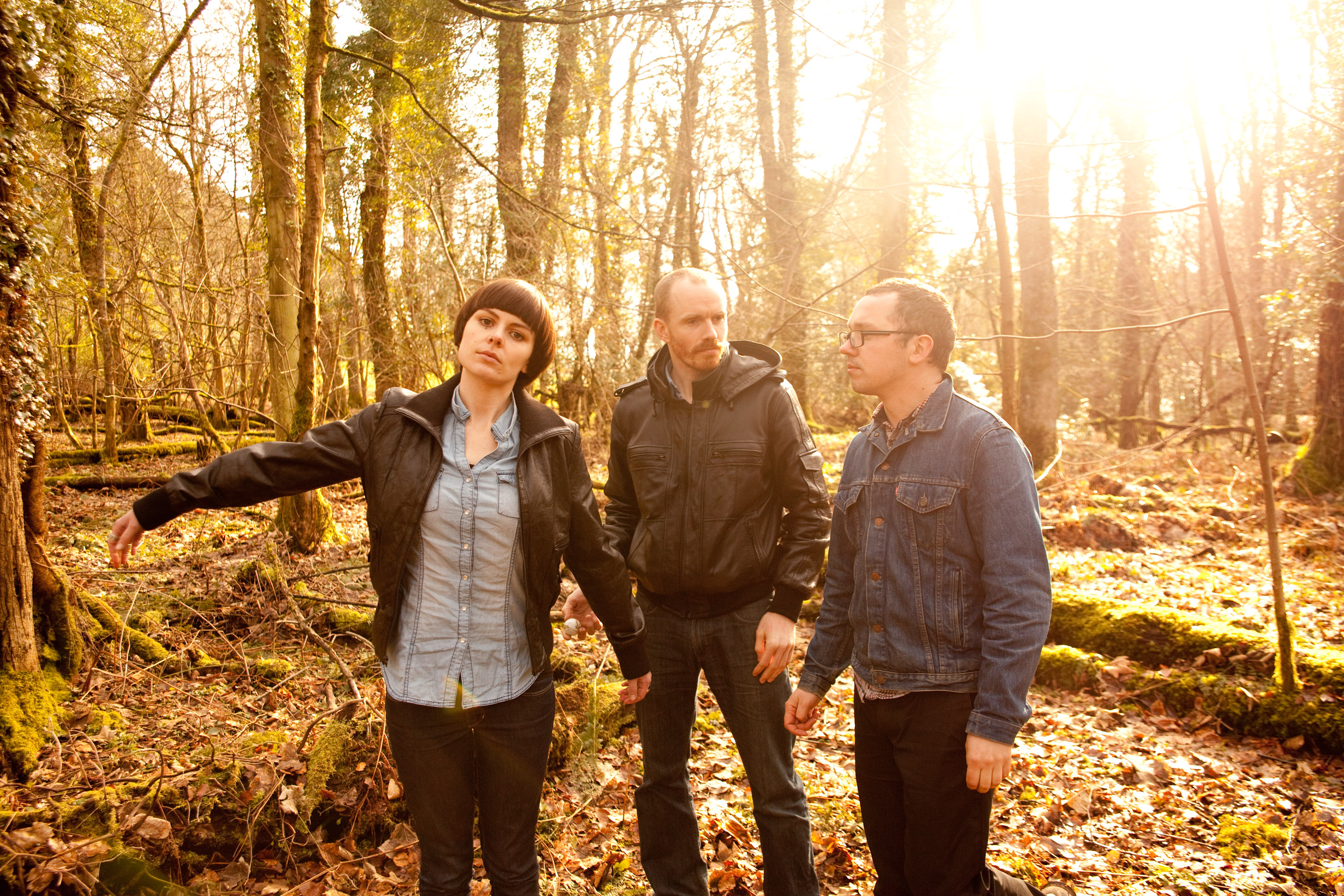
- Sparrow and the Workshop

Background information
- Origin: Glasgow, Scotland
- Genres: Indie rock
- Years active: 2008-2014
- Label: Song, by Toad Records
- Past members: Jill O'Sullivan; Nick Packer; Gregor Donaldson
- Website: http://www.sparrowandtheworkshop.co.uk

Sparrow and the Workshop were an indie three-piece based in Glasgow, consisting of the Belfast-born, Chicago-raised Jill O'Sullivan (vocals, acoustic guitar), Welshman Nick Packer (guitar, bass) and Scotsman Gregor Donaldson (drums, vocals). The band's debut album Crystals Fall was released by Distiller Records in 2010 to critical acclaim, with the likes of Drowned in Sound and Clash Magazine awarding the album 9/10. The band was notable for their use of harmonies and bastardized instruments/FX pedals and they have been compared to bands as varied as Jefferson Airplane, Talking Heads and Black Sabbath.

== Career ==
Sparrow formed in early 2008 and soon after caught the attention of Distiller Records, who offered to put out a single and EP for them in 2009. They have toured with many bands including British Sea Power, Idlewild, Broken Records, Sivert Hoyem (ex-Madrugada) and supported the likes of The Lemonheads and Thee Oh Sees. They were invited to support American psych-rockers Brian Jonestown Massacre on their 2010 European tour after band leader Anton Newcombe saw their video of Devil Song on YouTube. In May 2010 the band played a number of gigs in New York, one of which was again supporting Brian Jonestown Massacre in Williamsburg Music Hall. They were also invited by Spider Stacy to join The Pogues as main support (on Anton Newcombe's recommendation) on their 2010 Farewell Christmas Tour.

In 2008 the band played at Connect Festival and British Sea Power's Sing Ye from the Hillsides Festival in Tanhill, North Yorkshire. The following year they played the BBC Introducing tent at Glastonbury Festival in 2009, along with End of the Road Festival and Kendal Calling. They completed a string of festivals in 2010, including Green Man Festival, T in the Park, Bestival, Stag and Dagger, Pohoda, Hop Farm Festival, Moseley Folk Festival, Standon Calling, Y Not, 2000trees and the Insider festival in Aviemore.

The band released single Black to Red on 11 October 2010 through Distiller Records with an accompanying DIY 3D video.

In April 2011 the band released their second album, Spitting Daggers. Produced by acclaimed producer Leo Abrahams, the album was again well received with Drowned in Sound and the BBC giving the album 8/10 and 7.5 respectively. Spitting Daggers was released in Europe in September 2011.

On 6 January 2013, the Scottish blog and label Song, by Toad Records announced it will be releasing Sparrow's upcoming single, Shock Shock (produced by Iain Cook and ex-Delgados member Paul Savage). Their album Murderopolis was released in May 2013.

== After Sparrow ==
After releasing their third album, Murderopolis, in 2013, the band took a break and O'Sullivan formed an alt pop duo with Jenny Reeve and, with the help of drummer Johnny Scott, released the album Fly, Invisible Hero in 2017. O'Sullivan's latest project, Jill Lorean, is a collaboration between O'Sullivan and musician/producer Andy Monaghan and drummer Peter Kelly and has so far resulted in one 6-track EP, Not Your First (2020), and a full length album, This Rock (2022).

O'Sullivan has also released a collaborative album with renowned musicians Alasdair Roberts, Alex Neilson and Bonnie "Prince" Billy under the moniker Three Queens in Mourning (2020). In addition, she collaborated with Sean Cumming (John Knox Sex Club) on storytelling project Do the Gods Speak Esperanto, released in 2017.

== Discography ==
=== Studio albums ===
- Crystals Fall (2010, Distiller Records)
- Spitting Daggers (2011, Distiller Records)
- Murderopolis (2013, Song, by Toad Records)

=== EPs ===
- Sleight of Hand (2009, Distiller Records)
- Into the Wild (2009, Distiller Records)

=== Singles ===
- "Devil Song" (2009, Distiller Records)
- "Horses Grin" (2009, Distiller Records)
- "I Will Break You" (2010, Distiller Records)
- "Black to Red" (2010, Distiller Records)
- "Snakes in the Grass" (2011, Distiller Records)
- "Shock Shock" (2013, Song, by Toad Records)
- "The Faster You Spin" (2013, Song, by Toad Records)
