= Sluts of Trust =

Scottish rock band

- Origin: Glasgow, Scotland
- Genre: Indie rock
- Years active: 2002–present
- Label: Chemikal Underground
- Members: John McFarlane
- Past members: Anthony O'Donnell; Roo Harris

Sluts of Trust are a two-piece rock outfit from Glasgow, Scotland, originally comprising John McFarlane (guitar, vocals) and Anthony O'Donnell (drums). O'Donnell was later replaced on drums by Roo Harris.

== History ==
=== Early career ===
Sluts of Trust were formed in the summer of 2002 by John McFarlane and Anthony O'Donnell, after a wild three-day party, which became known as the Pirate Weekend. McFarlane and O'Donnell had first met as teenagers at Scottish Youth Theatre's Summer Festival in 1995. In the intervening years, both had begun aborted courses at Glasgow University and Cardonald College respectively, and had enjoyed limited success with separate musical projects. O'Donnell in Crambo, and in a band with fellow SYT graduate and future Harry Potter actor Sean Biggerstaff, and McFarlane had released a solo recording entitled "Broken Alarm Clock" on the Glasgow Queen Margaret Union NorthPark label compilation Unplugged, which he also performed on the BBC television programme The Beat Room. Having recently disbanded his latest group Tungsten Crust, McFarlane had been writing songs for a change of direction. He invited O'Donnell to drum with him and very quickly they blended to create a dynamic new sound. The band had originally been envisaged as a trio, but stayed as a guitar/drums duo after their prospective bass player failed to turn up to their first rehearsal.

After a few months rehearsing and fine-tuning McFarlane's original compositions, the duo were invited to open for up-and-coming Glasgow band Lapsus Linguae, by their friend Iain Campbell, for Lapsus' sold-out New Year's Eve gig at King Tut's Wah Wah Hut. As a warm-up for this the band played their first ever gig as Sluts of Trust on 17 December 2002 in Starka Bar, Motherwell. The gig at King Tut's was a huge success and was seen by established Glasgow rockers Aereogramme, then signed to Chemikal Underground Records, who brought the duo to the label's attention. More gigs followed, supporting The Hunches at Nice 'N' Sleazy and at Bannerman's in Edinburgh, where all four members of The Delgados (the Mercury Prize-nominated indie band who owned and ran Chemikal Underground Records) arrived. Sluts of Trust were signed to Chemikal the next week having played only four gigs.

Following the band's first UK-wide tour, supporting label-mates Aereogramme, they retreated to Chemikal Underground's recording studios, Chem19 in Hamilton to begin work on their debut album with Paul Savage of The Delgados as producer. In November however they took a short break from recording to perform at the London Calling festival at the Paradiso, Amsterdam alongside Franz Ferdinand and The Darkness, before returning to the studio.

=== Singles and debut album ===
Sluts of Trust released their debut single "Piece O' You" on 21 November 2003, on limited edition 7-inch red vinyl. Limited to 1000 pressings, the single sold out in a week. The b-side featured live favourite "Meanwhile In Rocksville". The single was championed by BBC Radio 1 DJ John Peel and would feature at #16 in the end of year chart the Festive Fifty, voted for by listeners to his show. The Evening Times called the single "an intense, uncompromising, blistering, screaming, passionate, furious sweat-drenched full-frontal aural assault". A low-budget video was made to accompany the release and was conceived and directed by actor Johnny Austin and filmmaker Gregor Mackay, both friends of the band from Scottish Youth Theatre. A pastiche of Brian De Palma's Carrie, it conveyed much of the theatre of early Sluts of Trust gigs, and alongside other members of the Scottish Youth Theatre it starred Sean Biggerstaff and Paul Kelly of The Martial Arts. The video was premiered at the launch of the single in Glasgow's Barfly, and projected onto McFarlane's own bed-sheet before the band played that night. The video was later screened on MTV2.

With their debut album nearing completion, in early 2004 Sluts of Trust travelled to the BBC's Maida Vale Studios in London to record a live session for John Peel's show on BBC Radio 1. Peel had become a huge fan of the group since hearing their debut single and some early demo recordings for their album and continued to champion the duo until his untimely death later that year. The band chose to record previously unreleased material from their forthcoming album. The session comprised original McFarlane compositions "The Greatest Gift", "That's Right, That Cat's Right" and "Tighter Than The Night". They also recorded a cover version of Talking Heads' "Psycho-Killer". The session was broadcast on 17 February 2004.

Sluts of Trust played their first gig on American soil in March 2004 at the South by Southwest Festival in Austin, Texas, signing a US management deal with Management Music Division while they were there, before embarking on a full-scale US tour with The Delgados and Malcolm Middleton. The band returned to tour the US again within months.

Second single "Leave You Wanting More" was released in April 2004 to great acclaim, with British broadsheet The Independent making it their Single of the Week, and describing it as "a sexed-up blast of pounding riffs and art-punk breaks with an amazing amount of textures involved considering they're a mere two- piece". It was described in The Scotsman as "sounding simultaneously crazed and precision controlled". The CD single also included a new McFarlane composition "Crowd Pleaser" along with "Psycho-Killer" from the Peel session. Again an accompanying video was conceived and directed by Johnny Austin and Gregor Mackay. Seen as a companion piece to the "Piece O' You" video, this was filmed with the RAF veterans of Glasgow's Royal Air Force Association club and at Glasgow's Museum of Transport, and was again shown on MTV2. The single would be placed at #5 in John Peel's posthumous final Festive Fifty.

Sluts of Trust released their debut album We Are All Sluts of Trust in Europe on 26 April and the US in May 2004 on Chemikal Underground Records, to positive reviews, but modest sales, selling up to 10,000 copies worldwide. The album was produced by Paul Savage of The Delgados (already known for producing albums by Mogwai and Aereogramme and later for producing Franz Ferdinand's third album). In addition to the material the band had been playing live, the album contained a new song titled "Pirate Weekend". Something of a departure from the band's sleazy garage rock, the song featured lush and haunting overdubbed harmonies and would become a fan favourite. To support the album's release the duo quickly embarked on another UK tour.

Following a UK tour, the band returned to the United States to promote the album there. The band had been invited to tour with burlesque dance group Suicide Girls and played to large audiences across the USA. The NME published an extensive feature on the tour along with pictures from an exclusive photo-shoot of the band with members of Suicide Girls. During a break in the tour Sluts of Trust travelled to Los Angeles to play their own gigs at Amoeba Records, L.A Spaceland, and nightclub The Viper Room.

=== Second line-up ===
On the duo's return to the UK they immediately began touring the country once again, however in November 2004, tired of the relentless touring, drummer Anthony O'Donnell left the band to concentrate on his writing career in theatre and television. McFarlane moved swiftly to recruit Roo Harris as his replacement. The pair began rehearsing the material from the band's debut album, along with some new McFarlane originals in early 2005.

The new line-up of Sluts of Trust played their first official gig at the South By Southwest festival in Austin, Texas in March 2005. It was here that they were introduced to an up-and-coming London band called Bloc Party, who were fans of the Sluts' debut album. As well as effusing on their love of Sluts of Trust in many interviews, Bloc Party's Gordon Moakes was seen to wear a Sluts of Trust T-shirt when the band played Glastonbury, and on the front cover of the NME. Bloc Party would also invite Sluts of Trust to support them on a European tour later that year.

In the summer of 2005 Sluts of Trust unveiled their new line-up to the UK at a series of festival appearances. The band played at T in the Park, Musicworks, T on the Fringe and fittingly John Peel Day. Their appearance as part of the Edinburgh Festival featured the Suicide Girls.

In September 2005 Sluts of Trust went back to the studio to record an EP of new material under the supervision of producer Rico. At least three tracks were recorded, "Hit The Game", "Overcome By Wonder" and "Luvvin' of Love". An exclusive video for "Hit The Game" was shot by the BBC for their television programme The Music Show and aired following the year, but plans to release the EP were scrapped by McFarlane who was not happy with the material and there has yet to be an official release.

In November 2005 Sluts of Trust embarked on a European tour in support of Bloc Party, playing large arena venues across Spain and Italy.

In January 2006 Sluts of Trust were invited to record a track featuring the work of Scottish poet Robert Burns for BBC Radio's One World Burns Night Special. McFarlane composed a new track using the Burns poem "Why Should We Idly Waste Our Prime" The session was broadcast on Burns Night World Supper Special on BBC Radio 1.

In the summer of 2006, BBC1's music television programme The Music Show aired an exclusive video for new Sluts of Trust song "Hit The Game". The video saw McFarlane and Harris perform the song in a bowling alley. The song has never been given an official release.

Later in the summer of 2006 Chemikal Underground Records released a compilation compact disc and DVD of some of the highlights of the label's history entitled CHEM087 CD + DVD. The CD included Sluts of Trust debut single "Piece O' You", alongside tracks from The Delgados, Mogwai, Arab Strap and Interpol. The DVD included the videos for singles "Piece O' You" and "Leave You Wanting More" with an audio commentary from McFarlane and co-director Johnny Austin. To launch the release both videos were screened at Glasgow's Centre for Contemporary Arts.

=== Recent Appearances ===
Since 2007 Sluts of Trust have been seen little. John McFarlane has made a few low-key solo acoustic appearances, performing only entirely new material and is said to be working on a new album.

In early 2008 at a low-key solo gig where he played a full set of new material he announced his intention to return with a new Sluts of Trust album later in the year.

== Musical style ==
The band were described by The Scotsman as "a seedy 1970s porn baron and his silent but violent henchman playing gutter-trawling, kerb-crawling blues punk with skyscraping vocals and a predilection for the occasional Eddie Van Halen guitar 'lick'", also being described as "testosterone-fuelled bluesy punk".

Craig McLean of the Daily Telegraph described the band's music as "garagey-blues". The band have been called "a Scots White Stripes", but with "much more hidden menace", with songs described as "a mix of Led Zeppelin and 90s American indie", with their style described as "scuzzy experimental rock", a "garage metal cacophony", "aggroglam", and "sleaze-rock" comprising "manic rigging, high-speed drumming and porno lyrics".

Andrew Eaton of The Scotsman described them as a combination of "the rock'n'roll basics of the White Stripes with the showy excess of The Darkness".

== Discography ==
- "Piece O' You" / "Meanwhile In Rocksville" (double A-side single), 21 November 2003, Chemikal Underground
- "Leave You Wanting More" (single), 5 April 2004, Chemikal Underground
- We Are All Sluts of Trust (album), 26 April 2004, Chemikal Underground
