= In Search of Harperfield =

Studio album by Emma Pollock
- Released: 29 January 2016
- Genre: Indie rock
- Length: 44:23
- Label: Chemikal Underground
- Producer: Paul Savage

Emma Pollock chronology
The Law of Large Numbers (2010)	In Search of Harperfield (2016)

Singles from In Search of Harperfield
- 1. "Parks and Recreation" Released: 22 January 2016

Professional ratings
Aggregate scores
Source	Rating
Metacritic	83/100
Review scores
Source	Rating
AllMusic	4.5/5 stars
The Skinny	4/5 stars
Drowned in Sound	8/10 stars
Louder Than War	8/10 stars
The Quietus	(positive)

In Search of Harperfield is the third studio album by the Scottish singer-songwriter and musician Emma Pollock, released on 29 January 2016 by Chemikal Underground, and was her first studio album in five and a half years following 2010's The Law of Large Numbers.

On release, the album received critical acclaim but it failed to chart. Uncut magazine included it in their Top 75 albums of 2016 list at No. 65.

== Track listing ==
All tracks are written by Emma Pollock, except where noted.

Side one
No.	Title	Length
1.	"Cannot Keep a Secret"	4:24
2.	"Don't Make Me Wait"	4:10
3.	"Alabaster"	4:32
4.	"Clemency"	2:39
5.	"Intermission"	4:47

Side two
No.	Title	Writer(s)	Length
6.	"Parks and Recreation"		3:13
7.	"Vacant Stare"		3:29
8.	"In the Company of the Damned"	RM Hubbert; Emma Pollock	3:34
9.	"Dark Skies"		3:29
10.	"Monster in the Pack"		4:27
11.	"Old Ghosts"		5:42
Total length:			44:23

== Personnel ==
Credits are adapted from the album's liner notes.

Musicians

- Emma Pollock – lead and background vocals; guitar; bass guitar; keyboards; piano; xylophone; dulcimer
- Paul Savage – drums; programming; guitar; bass guitar; keyboards; string arrangements; percussion

Additional musicians

- David McAulay – guitar; bass guitar; drum machine
- Malcolm Lindsay – strings; string arrangements; cello
- Michael John McCarthy – keyboards; accordion
- Cairn String Quartet – strings; string arrangements
- RM Hubbert – guitar
- Graeme Smillie – piano
- Jackie Baxter – cello

Production and artwork

- Paul Savage – producer; engineer; mixer; mastering
- Niall Smillie – artwork
