= Weem (album) =

Studio album by De Rosa
- Released: 22 January 2016
- Recorded: Weem 2012; The Cottage, Loch Fyne 2014
- Genre: Indie rock
- Label: Rock Action Records

De Rosa chronology
Prevention (2009)	Weem (2016)

Professional ratings
Review scores
Source	Rating
The Skinny	link
The List	link

Weem is the third album by Scottish indie rock band De Rosa. It was released on 22 January 2016 on Rock Action Records. It was recorded in 2012 Weem and Loch Fyne by the band, and mixed by Andy Miller.
While the band recorded the album as a five-piece, Chris Connick and Andy Bush left the band after its completion.

The Album borrows three tracks from the 2008 Appendices (which was released one track per month over the course of the year).

== Accolades ==
Publication	Accolade	Year	Rank
The Skinny	Top 50 Albums of 2016	2016	48

== Track listing ==
1. Spectres - 5:53
2. Lanes - 3:30
3. Chip on My Shoulder - 3:48
4. Scott Fank Juniper - 4:25
5. Falling Water - 3:05
6. Fausta - 3:25
7. Prelude to Entropic Doom - 3:45
8. The Sea Cup - 3:35
9. Devils - 4:37
10. Lanes (Reprise) - 1:26
11. The Mute - 3:39

== Personnel ==
- Martin John Henry – vocals, guitars
- James Woodside – bass
- Neil Woodside – drums
- Chris Connick – guitars
- Andrew Bush – piano
