= Broken Chanter =

Scottish rock musician

- Born: David MacGregor
- Origin: Glasgow, Scotland
- Genres: Alternative, indie rock, indie pop, power pop, Post-pop, Folk, electronic,
- Years active: 2018–present
- Labels: Chemikal Underground, Last Night From Glasgow, Olive Grove Records
- Website: https://brokenchanter.com

Broken Chanter is the stage name of Scottish musician David MacGregor, a moniker he adopted in recognition of his poor attempts as a toddler to play his grandfather's chanter, which led to it being hidden from him.

== Career ==
=== Origin and Broken Chanter LP ===
MacGregor was the principal songwriter of Kid Canaveral until guitarist Kate Lazda's departure led to the dissolution of the band in 2017. In early 2018, after writing demos in a closed gift shop in the Highlands and on the Isle of Skye, MacGregor travelled to County Donegal with drummer Audrey Tait and multi-instrumentalist/producer Gal to begin recording an album for an as-yet unnamed solo project. Working on a song a day, starting with a demo in the morning, interspersed with walks on one the numerous local beaches, the trio returned to Glasgow where the recording was finished. The resulting eponymous debut album as Broken Chanter was released to critical acclaim in September 2019 with The Skinny calling it "A Stunning, stately debut", and featured Audrey Tait, Gal, Jill O'Sullivan, Gav Prentice, Kim Carnie, Hannah Shepherd, and Emma Kupa.

=== COVID-19 pandemic and Catastrophe Hits ===
With touring to promote Broken Chanter cut short by the COVID-19 pandemic, MacGregor spent the many lockdowns recording and releasing ambient and instrumental EPs for Bandcamp Fridays. MacGregor stated that he did this to make sure that was remaining creative during the pandemic-required lockdowns.

MacGregor recorded the second Broken Chanter album at Chem 19 with producer Paul Savage in March and April 2021, having exchanged demos and notes during lockdown prior to in-person pre-production sessions when restrictions allowed. Catastrophe Hits was released on 29 October 2021 on Last Night From Glasgow and Olive Grove Records, going on to win The Weekender's Album of the Year award, and reaching number 7 in the Scottish Album Chart, number 10 in the UK Vinyl Chart, number 16 in the UK Independent Album Chart, and number 30 in the UK Physical Sales Chart. The album's first single Extinction Event Souvenir T-shirt was ranked at number 20 in The Herald's Top 100 songs of 2021, and So Long! (I'm Not Around) was ranked at number 44 in The Herald's Top 100 songs of 2022.

=== Chemikal Underground and Chorus of Doubt ===
Chemikal Underground announced on 30 November 2023 that they had signed Broken Chanter and they would release MacGregor's third album in early 2024. On 5 April 2024 Chorus of Doubt was released to positive reviews with Uncut Magazine awarding it 8/10 and commenting "Songwriter David MacGregor’s particular skill is in camouflaging rage, heartbreak, and despair as uplifting earworms. [Chorus of Doubt] shows a band on top of their game…at its best it’s agit-pop with heart." Chorus of Doubt reached #99 in the Scottish Album Chart and #48 in the UK Download Chart in its week of release.

In September 2024, Chorus of Doubt was announced on the Longlist of 20 for the 2024 Scottish Album of the Year Award.

== Discography ==
=== Albums ===
- Broken Chanter (6 September 2019)
- Catastrophe Hits (29 October 2021) [#7 SCO; #10 UK Vinyl; #16 UK Indie; #5 UK Indie Breakers; #29 UK Physical]
- Chorus of Doubt (5 April 2024) [#99 SCO; #48 UK Download]
- This Could be Us, You, Or Anybody Else (10 April 2026) [#23 SCO; #75 UK Download]

=== Singles ===
- Wholesale (2019)
- Should We Be Dancing? (2019)
- Beside Ourselves (2020)
- Extinction Event Souvenir T-Shirt (2021)
- Dancing Skeletons (2021)
- Allow Yourself (2022)
- So Long! (I'm Not Around) (2022)
- You’ve Got To Stop Worrying All The Time (2024)
- The Rain Doesn’t Only Fall on You (2024)
- Gloom Bop (2024)
- Shake It To Bits (2026)
- A Year Without A Summer (2026)

=== EPs ===
- Don't Move to Denmark (2020)
- Ambient 1: Music for Airing Cupboards (2020)
- Ambient 2: Taking Mount Florida (By Strategy) (2020)
- Ambient 3: Here Come The Warm Regrets (2020)
- Ambient 4: Another Green Whirl (2020)
- Ambient 5: The Shut It Assembly (2020)
- Inside Broadcast – RenTV Session (2021)
- Horse Island (2022)
- Don’t You Think That Something Needs To Be Done? (2024)
