= De Rosa (band) =

Scottish rock band

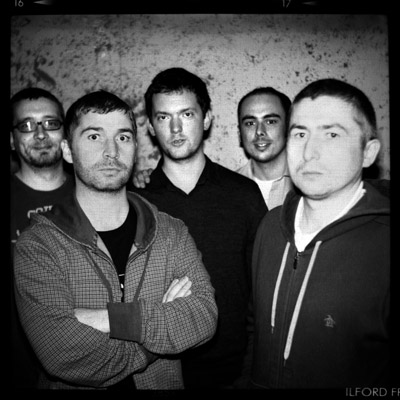
- _{Left to right: Chris Connick, James Woodside, Andrew Bush, Martin John Henry, Neil Woodside}

Background information
- Origin: Glasgow, Scotland
- Genres: Indie rock, indie folk, psychedelic folk, psychedelic rock
- Years active: 2001–2009, 2012–2021
- Labels: Chemikal Underground; Gargleblast Records
- Members: Martin John Henry; Chris Connick; James Woodside; Neil Woodside; Andrew Bush
- Website: www.wearederosa.com www.myspace.com/wearederosa

De Rosa were a Scottish rock band from Bellshill. They consisted of Martin Henry (vocals, guitar), Chris Connick (guitar), James Woodside (bass), Neil Woodside (drums) and Andrew Bush (piano/keyboards). The band released three studio albums—Mend, Prevention, and Weem.

== Music ==
De Rosa are noted for their use of guitar-based indie rock combined with Henry's personal lyrics sung in a Scottish accent. When asked about the importance of place in his lyrics, founding member and songwriter Martin Henry stated: "I guess in some small way I’m trying to give post-industrial Lanarkshire a place in culture." Although heavily influenced by the alternative rock music of the 1980s and 1990s, De Rosa's sound also references other subgenres of music, with elements of slowcore, Scottish folk and electronic music. In later performances De Rosa began to use more synthesisers and drum machines in their live set, their sound moving away from the guitar-based rock of their debut material towards a fusion of electronic and traditional styles.

== Line up ==
De Rosa was formed by main songwriter Martin John Henry in 2001. From 2007 the band became a five-piece (brothers James and Neil Woodside on bass and drums respectively, with Chris Connick on guitar and Andrew Bush on piano/keyboards). All of the band members come from Lanarkshire and Glasgow. Connick - school friend of Henry and long-time De Rosa collaborator—became a full member of De Rosa in 2006. Bush joined as pianist/keyboardist in 2007 having previously worked as the De Rosa live sound engineer.

== History ==
=== Early work and Mend (2004–2007) ===
De Rosa signed in 2004 to Lanarkshire label Gargleblast Records, run by Shaun Tallamy & Andy Miller. It was following the release of their debut single ("Camera"/"All Saints Day") in August 2004 that they first attracted interest from DJs including the late John Peel and Steve Lamacq. De Rosa was a three-piece in 2004–2005, the permanent members being Henry and drummer Neil Woodside, with James Woodside and Chris Connick sharing occasional bass duties. The band spent the rest of 2004 and most of 2005 recording their first album, Mend. The album was recorded by Andy Miller. Miller had been a friend and mentor of the band since their earliest rehearsals. The use of Chemikal Underground's recording studio led to the Glasgow label releasing Mend under licence from the band's original label.

Released in the UK on 19 June 2006, Mend was voted number 16 in British music magazine Mojo's top 50 albums of 2006.

The kind of parochial majesty you might encounter if The Pixies reworked The Go-Betweens' "Before Hollywood" for a documentary about the social history of Lanarkshire...

With James Woodside (bass) and Chris Connick (guitar) joining as permanent members after the completion of Mend, the four piece De Rosa spent many months touring and promoting the album. They embarked on tours supporting Scottish indie bands Mogwai and Arab Strap in Autumn 2006, and completed their first headline tour of Europe in April 2007.

=== Prevention and break-up (2008–2009) ===
The second De Rosa album, Prevention was released by Chemikal Underground Records on 2 March 2009. Once again the band worked with Mend producer Andy Miller at Chem 19 recording studios in Lanarkshire, Scotland. Guest musicians on the album include Barry Burns of Mogwai and Robert Johnston of Life Without Buildings. The cover artwork features a portrait of De Rosa painted by Glasgow writer and artist Alasdair Gray.

De Rosa toured in the UK and Europe in support of Prevention in spring 2009, and supported Doves on their UK tour dates in April. The band, however, announced that they were breaking up in June 2009, stating, "To all who listened, Unfortunately De Rosa has come to an end. If you liked our music or came to see us play then we'd like to thank you all. Goodbye, De Rosa." In 2011, vocalist and guitarist Martin John Henry released a solo album, entitled The Other Half of Everything on Gargleblast Records.

=== Reunion (2012–2021) ===
On 14 February 2012, the band announced that they had reunited, and that they would begin recording new material. They performed their first show at Kid Canaveral's Christmas Baubles on 14 December 2013 receiving positive reviews.

The group released their first new single, "Spectres", on 17 November 2015, as well as announcing the release of their third studio album Weem on Rock Action Records on 22 January 2016.

De Rosa split up for a second time in 2021.

== Discography ==
=== Studio albums ===
- Mend (2006) - Chemikal Underground
- Prevention (2009) - Chemikal Underground
- Weem (2016) - Rock Action Records

=== Singles ===
- "Camera" / "All Saints Day" (August 2004)
- "Camera" / "Amy’s Song" (June 2006)
- "Father’s Eyes" / "Evelyn" (November 2006)
- "Spectres" (November 2015)

=== Other releases ===
- CHEM 087 CD+DVD (August 2006)

Chemikal Underground's anniversary compilation. Includes the De Rosa track "Cathkin Braes".

- Ballads of the Book (March 2007)

Compilation featuring collaborations between Scottish writers and musicians. Includes "Steam Comes Off Our House", a collaboration with Michel Faber

- Appendices 2008 (2008)

A project where a free specially written and recorded song was given away free by MP3 download on the first Monday of each month of 2008. The result was a complete download only album of original songs.
