= Lord Cut-Glass (album) =

Studio album by Lord Cut-Glass
- Released: 22 June 2009
- Genre: Alternative
- Label: Chemikal Underground
- Producer: Alun Woodward

Singles from Lord Cut-Glass
- 1. "Look After Your Wife" Released: 16 June 2009

Professional ratings
Review scores
Source	Rating
Pitchfork Media	(6.4/10)
Planet Sound	8/10 stars
Scotland on Sunday	4/5 stars

Lord Cut-Glass is the debut studio album by Lord Cut-Glass, released on 22 June 2009 on Chemikal Underground.

== Track listing ==
All songs written by Alun Woodward.

1. "Even Jesus Couldn't Love You" – 4:15
2. "Look After Your Wife" – 4:10
3. "Holy Fuck!" – 3:41
4. "I'm A Great Example To The Dogs" – 2:18
5. "Monster Face" – 2:44
6. "You Know" – 4:04
7. "Be Careful What You Wish For" – 1:52
8. "Picasso" – 4:02
9. "A Pulse" – 3:42
10. "Big Time Teddy" – 2:53
11. "Toot Toot" – 3:13

== Singles ==
- "Look After Your Wife" (June 16, 2009)
1. "Look After Your Wife" – 3:25
2. "Over It" – 2:22
