= Allan Stewart (musician) =

- Born: Allan William Stewart; 21 January 1977 (age 49); Coventry, Warwickshire, England
- Origin: Farnborough, Hampshire, England
- Genres: Indie rock
- Occupations: Musician, Guitarist, Bassist, Touring Technician
- Instruments: Guitar, bass
- Years active: 1998-present

Allan William Stewart (born 21 January 1977 in Coventry, England) is an English musician. He is the second guitarist in Idlewild, the bassist in Holy Mountain and guitarist for the band Desalvo. In recent years, he joined the Nine Inch Nails crew, for whom he is Stage Manager. He grew up in Farnborough, Hampshire.

Stewart joined Idlewild as a touring guitarist in 2000 and became a full member in 2003, supporting Pearl Jam on a world tour amongst other crowning achievements. Stewart features on the Idlewild albums Warnings/Promises, Make Another World and Post Electric Blues, of which, on the latter he is also pictured on the cover. He co-wrote "I Never Wanted" on The Remote Part.

Following Idlewild's hiatus in 2010, Stewart joined Glasgow band Holy Mountain with Pete Flett (drums) and Andy McGlone (vocals). Stewart also commenced work as a guitar/bass/drum tech and Stage Manager for many popular touring bands, including Nine Inch Nails, Mogwai, The Jesus & Mary Chain, Franz Ferdinand, Primal Scream, Belle & Sebastian, Of Monsters and Men.

In 2019, Stewart once again took up touring guitarist duties for Idlewild whom he continues to perform with. He resides in Glasgow, Scotland, U.K. with his partner, two whippets and baby son.
