= RM Hubbert =

Scottish guitarist and singer (born 1974)

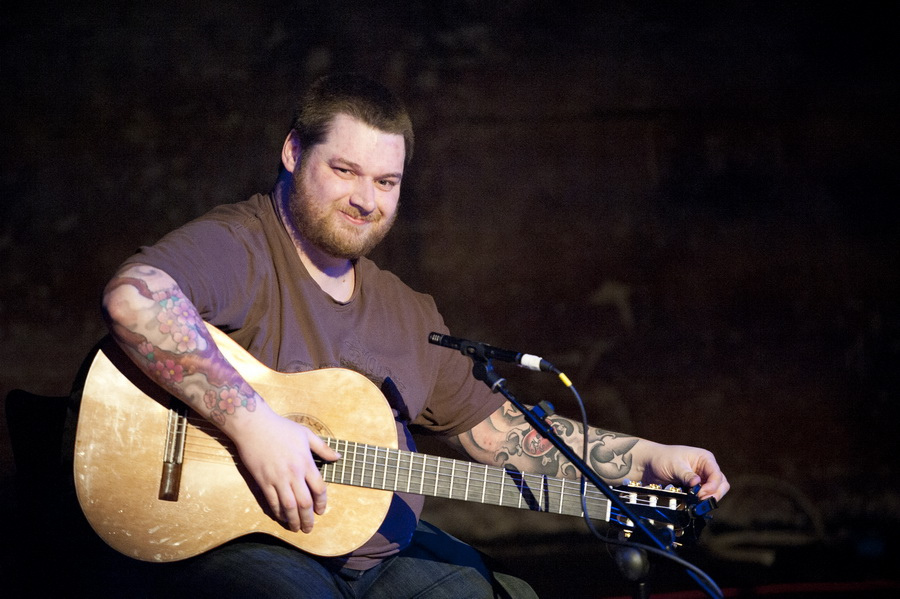
- Hubbert at the Arches, Glasgow, 2011

Background information
- Also known as: Hubby
- Born: Robert McArthur Hubbert; 12 May 1974 (age 52); Glasgow, Scotland
- Genres: Acoustic guitar, flamenco, post rock, punk
- Instrument: Flamenco guitar
- Years active: 2008–present
- Labels: Ubisano, Chemikal Underground, Rock Action
- Website: www.rmhubbert.com

RM Hubbert (Robert McArthur Hubbert, born 12 May 1974 in Glasgow, Scotland), commonly known as Hubby, is a Scottish guitarist and singer. Best known for his solo work as RM Hubbert and as a member of Scottish post rock band El Hombre Trajeado, he has been an active member of the Glaswegian DIY music scene since 1991.

== Musical career ==
Hubbert's first band was formed in 1991 under the name Me, Hubby & Thom. The band's drummer, Thom Falls, also played drums for Glasgow band The Blisters, notable as the first band of future Franz Ferdinand guitarist and singer Alex Kapranos. Kapranos and Hubbert became friends whilst running The Kazoo Club at The 13th Note in Glasgow after the original promoter quit. Hubbert later joined The Blisters on second guitar. He then joined Glaswegian hardcore band Glue in 1992 until the group split in 1995.

El Hombre Trajeado formed in 1995 with Stevie Jones, Ben Jones and Stef Sinclair, El Hombre Trajeado released three albums; Skipafone (Guided Missile Recordings, GUIDE33CD, 1998), Saccade (Human Condition Records, HCCD0031, 2001) and Shlap (Lost Dog Recordings, ARFF004, 2004) before disbanding in 2005. Although the band rarely toured, they supported artists such as Nick Cave, Sebadoh, Tortoise, Mike Watt and The Delgados around the UK. They recorded three radio sessions for John Peel on BBC Radio One between 1998 and 2001.

Originally planned as a distraction to take his mind off of the death of his parents, the nine solo guitar pieces that make up his debut album First & Last are based on flamenco structures and techniques, albeit with a modern approach to melody. Hubbert self-released First & Last as a limited edition handbound book with CD on the DIY label Ubisano in 2009. The release garnered good reviews, leading to the long running influential Scottish record label Chemikal Underground signing him in late 2010. Hubbert (credited as Robert Hubbert) also played electric guitar on Alasdair Roberts's 2010 album Too Long in This Condition. Chemikal Underground reissued First & Last on 12" vinyl and CD in early 2011.

Hubbert's second album for Chemikal Underground, Thirteen Lost & Found (2012), is predominately made up of collaborations with other Scottish musicians such as Aidan Moffat, Emma Pollock and Alasdair Roberts. The album was conceived as a way of reconnecting with old friends whilst getting to know newer ones better. This album also saw Hubbert work again with Alex Kapranos, who acted as producer.

A prolific live performer, Hubbert has toured extensively around the UK and mainland Europe both on his own and in support slots for the likes of Mogwai, Godspeed You! Black Emperor, The Twilight Sad, Franz Ferdinand, Bill Wells & Aidan Moffat, King Creosote, Emma Pollock and Thee Silver Mt. Zion.

Thirteen Lost & Found won the Scottish Album of the Year Award in 2013, beating albums by Emeli Sande, Calvin Harris, Django Django and The Twilight Sad amongst others, and picking up the £20,000 prize.

Breaks & Bone, Hubbert's third solo album – and the first on which he also sings – was released on Chemikal Underground in September 2013. It was short listed for the 2014 Scottish Album of the Year Award alongside albums by Biffy Clyro, Chvrches, Mogwai and Boards of Canada amongst others.

Ampersand Extras, consisting of unreleased recordings, b-sides and rarities, was released in September 2014 through Chemikal Underground.

In April 2016, Hubbert released his fifth album for Chemikal Underground, Telling the Trees. Envisaged as a companion piece to Thirteen Lost & Found, Hubbert went about writing and recording Telling the Trees in as opposite a manner as possible. Collaborators were chosen that he did not previously know and the songs were written remotely and in isolation. It was shortlisted for the 2016 Scottish Album of the Year Award alongside Mogwai, Honeyblood, Ela Orleans and the eventual winners, Sacred Paws.

In May 2018 Hubbert released a joint album with longtime friend and collaborator Aidan Moffat titled Here Lies the Body. Its lead single, Cockcrow, featured Siobhan Wilson on vocals along with Moffat. The track was playlisted by BBC 6 Music, as was a further single, Quantum Theory Love Story. Here Lies the Body entered the Scottish Album Chart at number 15 and was shortlisted for the 2019 Scottish Album of the Year Award.

Another album quickly followed in December 2019, again alongside Moffat – Ghost Stories for Christmas. This collection of Christmas themed songs entered the UK Record Store Chart at number 1.

Record Store Day 2019 saw the third full-length release with Aidan Moffat within a year, What the Night Bestows Us. Recorded live on tour in England in November 2018, the duo were joined by Jenny Reeve on violin and vocals for a set of stripped back arrangements from the duo's previous two collaborations.

Cut to Black, the final release by Moffat & Hubbert, was released on 7" in August 2019. It debuted at number 9 in the UK Vinyl Singles Chart.

== Discography ==
=== Singles ===
- "Sunbeam Melts The Hour" (with Hanna Tuulikki & Marion Kenny) / "For F**k Sake D, Sit Nice" (Chemikal Underground Records / CHEM170 / 22 January 2012)
- "Car Song" (with Aidan Moffat & Alex Kapranos) / "Mo Ve'La Bella Mia Da La" (with Alasdair Roberts & Emma Pollock) (Chemikal Underground Records / CHEM176 / 29 April 2012)
- "Cut To Black" (with Aidan Moffat) (Rock Action Records / ROCKACT128 / 9 August 2019)

=== EPs ===
Split Tour EP with Emma Pollock (Chemikal Underground Records / CHEM188 / 2 September 2012)

- "Half Light" (RM Hubbert, Emma Pollock & Rafe FitzPatrick)
- "The Night Is Heavy" (Emma Pollock with Adem)
- "SG-666" (RM Hubbert)
- "Dark Skies" (Emma Pollock)
- "Elliot" (RM Hubbert & Luke Sutherland)
- "Mo Ve'La Bella Mia Da La" (RM Hubbert, Alasdair Roberts & Emma Pollock)

=== Albums ===
First & Last (Chemikal Underground Records / CHEM156 / 28 February 2011)

- Hey There Mr Bone
- For Maria
- TipsyTapsy
- Jumphang
- Mrs Saunders
- By Reference
- Skyreburn
- Temple Circa 89
- Go Quickly

Thirteen Lost & Found (Chemikal Underground Records / CHEM166 / 30 January 2012)

- We Radioed (with Luke Sutherland)
- Car Song (with Aidan Moffat & Alex Kapranos)
- For Joe
- Gus Am Bris An Latha (with John Ferguson)
- Sunbeam Melts the Hour (with Marion Kenny & Hanna Tuulikki)
- V
- Sandwalks (with Stevie Jones & Paul Savage)
- Half Light (with Emma Pollock & Rafe Fitzpatrick)
- Hungarian Notation (with Shane Connolly, Alex Kapranos & Michael John McCarthy)
- Switches Part 2
- The False Bride (with Alasdair Roberts)

Breaks & Bone (Chemikal Underground Records / CHEM200 / 27 September 2013)

- Son of Princess, Brother of Rambo
- Bolt
- Couch Crofting
- Tongue Tied & Tone Deaf
- Go Slowly
- Feedback Loops
- For Helen
- 11 Dec
- Buckstacy
- Slights

Ampersand Extras (Chemikal Underground Records / CHEM217 / 13 October 2014)

- PB
- Song for Jenny (with Alan Bissett)
- Canine Shaped Frogs
- Elliot (with Luke Sutherland)
- Hanging Pointers
- True Love Will Find You in the End
- Sticky Pine
- For Fuck Sake D, Sit Nice
- Cherry Blossoms (with Esperi)
- SG 666
- Mo Ve'lla Bella Mia De La Muntagna (with Alasdair Roberts & Emma Pollock)

Telling the Trees (Chemikal Underground Records / CHEM238 / 29 April 2016)

- The Dinosaur Where We Fell in Love (with Anneliese Mackintosh)
- Self Portrait in a Convex Mirror (with Anneke Kampman)
- In Accordia (with Rachel Grimes)
- I Can Hold You Back (with Kathryn Williams)
- Sweet Dreams (with Marnie)
- The Dog (with Kathryn Joseph)
- The Unravelling (with Martha Ffion)
- Probably Will / Probably Do (with Sarah J Stanley)
- KAS (with Aby Vulliamy)
- Yew Tree (with Karine Polwart)
- Chelsea Midnight (with Eleanor Friedberger, Barry Burns & Jim Eno)

Here Lies the Body with Aidan Moffat (Rock Action Records / ROCKACT112 / 11 May 2018)

- Cockcrow (featuring Siobhan Wilson)
- Mz. Locum
- She Runs
- Quantum Theory Love Song
- Wolves of the Wood
- Keening for a Dead Love
- Zoltar Speaks
- Party On
- Everything Goes
- Fringe

Ghost Stories for Christmas with Aidan Moffat (Rock Action Records / ROCKACT119 / 7 December 2018)

- Fireside
- A Ghost Story for Christmas
- Desire Path (Baby Please Come Home)
- Such Shall You Be
- Lonely This Christmas
- Weihnachtsstimmung
- The Fir Tree
- Only You
- Ode to Plastic Mistletoe
- The Recurrence of Dickens

What The Night Bestows Us with Aidan Moffat (Live album, Rock Action Records / ROCKACT126 / 13 April 2019)

- Fireside
- Cockcrow
- Mz. Locum
- Everything Goes
- She Runs
- Party On
- A Ghost Story for Christmas
- Wolves of the Woods
- Quantum Theory Love Songs
- Fringe
- Hitler Lives
- Car Song
