= Why Should We Idly Waste Our Prime =

Poem by Robert Burns

"Why Should We Idly Waste Our Prime" is an English poem and song commonly attributed to Robert Burns Various authors have noted that Burns was likely not the original author of the poem.

== Lyrics ==
Why should we idly waste our prime
Repeating our oppressions?
Come rouse to arms! 'Tis now the time
To punish past transgressions.
'Tis said that Kings can do no wrong —
Their murderous deeds deny it,
And, since from us their power is sprung,
We have a right to try it.
Now each true patriot's song shall be: —
'Welcome Death or Libertie!'

Proud Priests and Bishops we'll translate
And canonize as Martyrs;
The guillotine on Peers shall wait;
And Knights shall hang in garters.
Those Despots long have trode us down,
And Judges are their engines:
Such wretched minions of a Crown
Demand the people's vengeance!
To-day 'tis theirs. To-morrow we
Shall don the Cap of Libertie!

The Golden Age we'll then revive:
Each man will be a brother;
In harmony we all shall live,
And share the earth together;
In Virtue train'd, enlighten'd Youth
Will love each fellow-creature;
And future years shall prove the truth
That Man is good by nature:
Then let us toast with three times three
The reign of Peace and Libertie!

== Meaning ==
The poem was penned following the French Revolution, and is commonly read as an attempt to incite the Scottish people to a similar revolution.
