= Watch the Fireworks =

Studio album by Emma Pollock
- Released: September 17, 2007
- Genre: Indie rock
- Length: 43:15
- Label: 4AD
- Producer: Victor Van Vugt

Emma Pollock chronology
| Watch the Fireworks (2007) | The Law of Large Numbers (2010) |

Professional ratings
Review scores
| Source | Rating |
|---|---|
| AllMusic | 3.5/5 stars |
| BBC | Positive link |
| Pitchfork Media | 7.4/10 link |
| Rockfeedback | link |
| Stylus Magazine | C+ link |

Watch the Fireworks is the debut studio album by the Scottish singer-songwriter Emma Pollock, released on 17 September 2007 by 4AD.

== Track listing ==
All tracks are written by Emma Pollock.

| No. | Title | Length |
|---|---|---|
| 1. | "New Land" | 4:49 |
| 2. | "Acid Test" | 3:51 |
| 3. | "Paper and Glue" | 3:46 |
| 4. | "Limbs" | 3:43 |
| 5. | "Adrenaline" | 4:58 |
| 6. | "If Silence Means That Much to You" | 3:46 |
| 7. | "Fortune" | 3:29 |
| 8. | "You'll Come Around" | 3:23 |
| 9. | "This Rope's Getting Tighter" | 3:14 |
| 10. | "Here Comes the Heartbreak" | 3:20 |
| 11. | "The Optimist" | 4:57 |
| Total length: | | 43:15 |

== Singles ==
Adrenaline ( 7" – May 28, 2007)

1. Adrenaline – 5:01
2. A Glorious Day – 3:21 (from a poem by Brendan Cleary)

Acid Test (CD & 7" – September 3, 2007)

1. Acid Test – 3:52
2. A Temporary Fix – 4:17

Paper and Glue (CD & 7" – November 26, 2007)

1. Paper and Glue – 3:45
2. I Have a Double – 4:48
