= The Unwinding Hours =

British band

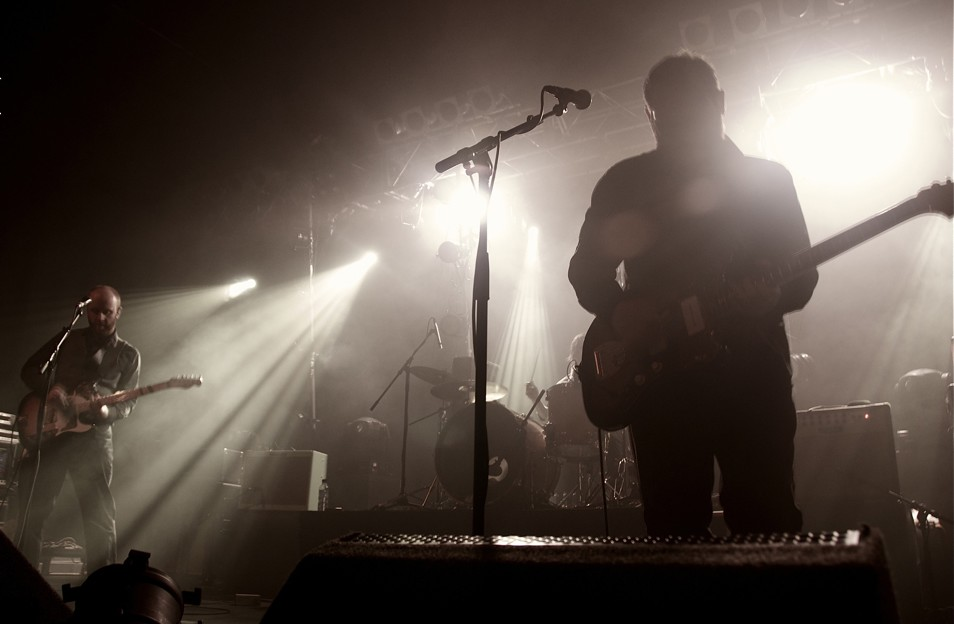
- The Unwinding Hours (2010)

Background information
- Origin: Glasgow, Scotland
- Genre: Alternative rock
- Years active: 2008–2013
- Label: Chemikal Underground
- Spinoff of: Aereogramme
- Past members: Craig B. Iain Cook

The Unwinding Hours was a Scottish alternative rock band formed in 2008 by former Aereogramme members Craig B. and Iain Cook. The band released their self-titled debut album on 15 February 2010 and Afterlives in 2012, as well as several tour/live EPs.

The duo announced their project in August 2009 with the following statement: "We used to play in a band called Aereogramme. That may or may not matter to you. Just thought I'd mention it".

== History ==
Regarding the band's origins, vocalist Craig B. stated that:

[Iain Cook] was always a really good musical sparring partner [...] and this slowly started up again when I began recording some demos at his studio on the south side of Glasgow at the start of 2008. There was never a clear goal in mind but we knew we had no desire to try and get another band going so we just kept writing and recording until we had enough material for an album.

In August 2009, the band set up a Myspace account featuring a demo track, "Solstice", and a blog entry which read:

Hello. Thanks for coming. This is "The Unwinding Hours" – Craig B and Iain Cook. We have been slowly writing, playing, programming and recording demos since 2008 and now we have 10 songs. "Solstice" is a small taster of what's to come. The drums have already been recorded by Paul Savage at chem.19. The rest of the album will be recorded at Iain Cook's studio starting on the 24th of August. We are quietly excited. The album will be released at some point next year. There are no plans to tour yet. Feel free to ask any questions. Cheers

The band made their live debut at Celtic Connections 2010, performing at Chemikal Underground's "15th Anniversary" concert. They played their first headlining show to a sold-out crowd in Stereo, Glasgow, on 5 March, opening with the words "We are The Unwinding Hours. And we're going to start with the end", before playing the closing track from their debut album. For some of their gigs, the base duo of The Unwinding Hours added musicians Graeme Smillie (guitar), Brendan Smith (keyboards) and Jonny Scott (drums).

The band has not been active since 2013, with Iain Cook focusing on Chvrches and Craig B. releasing solo material as A Mote of Dust.

== Discography ==
- The Unwinding Hours (2010)
- Afterlives (2012)
