= Alun Woodward =

Scottish singer-songwriter

- Also known as: Lord Cut-Glass
- Born: 11 December 1971 (age 54); Coatbridge, Scotland
- Genres: Indie
- Instruments: Vocals, guitar
- Label: Chemikal Underground
- Formerly of: The Delgados

Alun Woodward (born 11 December 1971), also known by the stage name Lord Cut-Glass, is a musician from Coatbridge, Scotland, and a founding member of influential Glasgow-based band The Delgados. The name Lord Cut-Glass comes from a character in the Dylan Thomas radio play Under Milk Wood.

Woodward's first full-length album, self-titled Lord Cut-Glass, was released on 22 June 2009. He has contributed two other tracks under the moniker of Lord Cut-Glass. The first, "A Sentimental Song", released in March 2007, was part of the Scottish indie/folk compilation Ballads of the Book with lyrics written by the author Alasdair Gray. It was released by record label Chemikal Underground which, as part of The Delgados, Woodward helped create in 1995. He also served as the record label's director. Woodward has subsequently released one further track, "Maybe", as part of the compilation Worried Noodles.

In 2007, The Guardian wrote of his performance for Ballads of the Book: "He is whispery, tremulous in the extreme, and his fragile folky melodies are bolstered with cello and violin; a definite trope in the Glasgow music scene."

Woodward played his debut solo set as part of Tigerfest in Dunfermline on 16 May 2009, where he premiered material from his first solo album. In reviewing his self-titled album, The Scotsman called the work "unconventional yet strangely compromising, one of the year's best".

In 2016 he released Music from Battle Mountain, the soundtrack to a documentary about cyclist Graeme Obree.

Woodward has worked as the music programmer for the Platform arts centre in Easterhouse, Glasgow. He was instrumental in bringing together the musical project Out Lines, whose debut album Conflats came out in 2017 on Rock Action Records, featuring Kathryn Joseph, The Twilight Sad's James Graham and Marcus Mackay.
