= Paul Savage (musician) =

Scottish musician (born 1971)

- Born: January 1971 (age 55)
- Origin: Glasgow, Scotland
- Occupations: Musician, record producer
- Formerly of: The Delgados

Paul Savage (born January 1971) is a Scottish musician and record producer, best known for being the drummer in the Scottish indie rock group The Delgados.

== Early life ==
Savage was born in Glasgow in January 1971. As a child, he grew up in the United States before returning to Scotland in 1983.

== Career ==
=== The Delgados ===
At school in Motherwell he met Alun Woodward and Stewart Henderson. Early bands including these three were Megan's Frame and Bubblegum. When they were forced out of Bubblegum, they formed their own band with Paul's girlfriend, Emma Pollock, and called themselves The Delgados.

=== Record producer and engineer ===
Savage has engineered, mixed and/or produced numerous records, including:

- Broken Chanter - Catastrophe Hits (2021)
- King Creosote - From Scotland with Love (2014)
- King Creosote - That Might Well Be It, Darling (2013)
- Soup - The Beauty of Our Youth (2013)
- King Creosote – Flick the Vs (2009)
- Franz Ferdinand – “Tonight”
- Admiral Fallow - "Boots Met My Face"
- The Phantom Band – Checkmate Savage
- Brakes – "Touchdown"
- Mogwai – Ten Rapid (Collected Recordings 1996-1997)
- Mogwai – Mogwai Young Team
- Arab Strap – The Week Never Starts Round Here
- Malcolm Middleton – 5:14 Fluoxytine Seagull Alcohol John Nicotine
- Malcolm Middleton – Into The Woods
- Sluts of Trust - We Are All Sluts of Trust
- The Delgados – Domestiques
- Arab Strap – Philophobia
- Aereogramme – A Story in White
- Malcolm Middleton – Into the Woods
- Arab Strap – The Last Romance
- Mother and the Addicts - Take the Lovers Home Tonight
- Various Artists (Vashti Bunyan, King Creosote, Mike Heron, Malcolm Middleton, Aidan Moffatt, Emma Pollock, Trashcan Sinatras, Aereogramme, James Yorkston) – Ballads of the Book
- Teenage Fanclub – 2 B sides for "Man Made"
- King Creosote – Bombshell
- The Twilight Sad – Fourteen Autumns and Fifteen Winters
- Emma Pollock – Watch the Fireworks
- Mother and the Addicts – Science Fiction Illustrated
- Camera Obscura – 6 B-sides for Let's Get Out of This Country
- Franz Ferdinand – All My Friends (cover of LCD Soundsystem)
- Malcolm Middleton – Sleight of Heart
- Zoey Van Goey – The Cage was Unlocked All Along
- Wake the President - You Can't Change that Boy
- Lord Cut-Glass – Lord Cut-Glass
- Mogwai - Hardcore Will Never Die But You Will
- Emma Pollock – The Law of Large Numbers
- Zoey Van Goey – Propellor Versus Wings
- Deacon Blue - The Hipsters
- RM Hubbert - Thirteen Lost & Found
- Adam Stafford - Build a Harbour Immediately
