= The Delgados =

Scottish indie rock band

Background information
- Origin: Glasgow, Scotland
- Genres: Indie rock; symphonic pop
- Years active: 1994–2005; 2022–2023
- Labels: Chemikal Underground; Radar; Mantra
- Members: Alun Woodward; Emma Pollock; Stewart Henderson; Paul Savage

The Delgados was a Scottish indie rock band formed in Glasgow in 1994. The band was composed of Alun Woodward (vocals, guitar), Emma Pollock (vocals, guitar), Stewart Henderson (bass guitar), and Paul Savage (drums).

== Biography ==
The band was formed after friends Woodward, Henderson and Savage were ejected from the band Bubblegum. Joined by Savage's then-girlfriend (and later wife) Pollock, the band named themselves after Pedro Delgado, a Spanish former professional road bicycle racer who won the 1988 Tour de France.

Their first commercial release came with the inclusion of their track "Liquidation Girl" on the compilation album Skookum Chief Powered Teenage Zit Rock Angst by Nardwuar. Instead of signing to a record label, the band started their own, Chemikal Underground, on which they released their own records and also some from other local bands, among them Mogwai and Arab Strap. Chemikal Underground's first release was the Delgados first single "Monica Webster"/"Brand New Car". The single caught the attention of BBC Radio 1 disc jockey (DJ) John Peel, and the band quickly became one of his favourites, going on to record seven sessions for his show.

The cost of Chemikal Underground's second release, the single "Disco Nation 45" by Bis, left the cash-strapped label unable to afford another release by the Delgados, so their next release "Lazarwalker" came from the London-based Radar Records. Tempted by Radar to a five-album deal, the band declined, instead poaching their A&R contact, Graeme Beattie, for work at Chemikal Underground.

Another single, "Cinecentre" followed in early 1996 as the band juggled work at the label with several tours, and recorded their debut studio album. The band released two more singles, this time taken from their album Domestiques (also a cycling reference) released in November 1996. The song "Under Canvas, Under Wraps" being voted number three in John Peel's Festive Fifty that year.

The band released their second studio album in 1998, Peloton – another cycling reference. The single "Pull the Wires from the Wall" gave the Delgados their first charting single in the UK Singles Chart, reaching number 69. The band's close relationship with Peel continued, with "Pull the Wires from the Wall" voted to number one in the Festive Fifty (it would also make the all time chart made in 2000).

The Delgados' evolution continued with The Great Eastern in 2000. The record was produced by Dave Fridmann. Their next single, "American Trilogy", reached number 61 in the UK chart. The record was nominated for the Mercury Music Prize.

Their fourth studio album, Hate, was released on Mantra rather than the band's own label. The song "The Light Before We Land" was used as the opening theme for the Japanese anime series Gunslinger Girl, while the song "Woke from Dreaming" is played at the beginning of episode 7.

The band returned to their own label for their fifth and final studio album Universal Audio (2004).

The band announced they were splitting up in April 2005 due to the departure of Henderson who found it difficult "to pour so much of my energy and time into something that never quite seemed to get the attention or respect [he] felt it deserved." The four will continue to run Chemikal Underground together. Songwriters Pollock and Woodward are pursuing individual projects, while Savage will continue production duties at the band's Chem19 in a new studio.

Since the band's separation, the track "I Fought the Angels" from Universal Audio has been used in the fourth episode in the second season of the Golden Globe Award-winning medical drama Grey's Anatomy in 2006, and in the opening scene in the series premiere of BBC Three's Lip Service in 2010.

A double disc containing 29 tracks, The Complete BBC Peel Sessions, was released on 12 June 2006 in Europe, and later in the year in the United States. Woodward released his debut solo studio album in June 2009 under the name Lord Cut-Glass. Savage also played on the album.

In June 2022, the band announced that they had reformed and would play together for the first time in 17 years. A UK tour of five gigs, ending in their home city of Glasgow, is scheduled for January 2023. Further dates for festivals were later confirmed, including Primavera Sound (Spain) and Deer Shed (England). Following this tour, there were no further announcements but the description for Emma Pollock's solo tour in 2025 described her as a 'former member' of The Delgados, indicating that the band had gone their separate ways once again.As of 2026, her official website, which presents her as a solo artist, confirms the claim of the disbandment.

== Discography ==
=== Studio albums ===
Title	Album details	Peak chart positions		
Title	Album details	SCO	UK	UK Indie
Domestiques	Released: 28 October 1996; Label: Chemikal Underground (CHEM009); Formats: LP, CD, Download	97	–	–
Peloton	Released: 8 June 1998; Label: Chemikal Underground (CHEM024); Formats: LP, CD, Download	52	56	6
The Great Eastern	Released: 17 April 2000; Label: Chemikal Underground (CHEM040); Formats: LP, CD, Download	31	72	12
Hate	Released: 14 October 2002; Label: Mantra (MNT1031); Formats: LP, CD	27	57	5
Universal Audio	Released: 20 September 2004; Label: Chemikal Underground (CHEM075); Formats: LP, CD, Download	49	105	14
"–" denotes items that did not chart or were not released in that territory.

=== Live albums ===
Title	Album details	Peak chart positions	Notes
Title	Album details	UK Indie	Notes
BBC Sessions	Released: 1997; Label: Strange Fruit (SFRSCD037); Formats: CD	–	Taken from Mary Anne Hobbs, Mark Radcliffe and John Peel shows; Includes an acoustic session for Radio Scotland's Jump the Q; 11-track live compilation album
Live at the Fruitmarket	Released: 2001; Label: Chemikal Underground; Formats: CD	–	Recorded on 20 January 2001 at the Fruitmarket, Glasgow; The final show of The Delgados' Great Eastern tour; 14-track, card case, live compilation album
The Complete BBC Peel Sessions	Released: 12 June 2006; Label: Chemikal Underground (CHEM088); Formats: CD, Download	13	Recorded on The BBC's John Peel shows between 1995 and 2004; 29-track, double CD, live compilation album
"–" denotes items that did not chart or were not released in that territory.

=== Extended plays ===
Year	Title	Tracks
1995	Lazarwalker	Primary Alternative; Lazarwalker; Buttonhole; Blackwell

=== Singles ===
Year	Title	Peak chart positions			Album
Year	Title	SCO	UK	UK Indie	Album
1995	"Monica Webster"	–	–	–	Non-album singles
1996	"Cinecentre"	–	–	–	Non-album singles
1996	"Under Canvas Under Wraps"	–	186	–	Domestiques
1996	"Sucrose"	100	155	–	Domestiques
1998	"Everything Goes Around the Water"	62	77	11	Peloton
1998	"Pull the Wires from the Wall"	57	69	15	Peloton
1998	"The Weaker Argument Defeats the Stronger"	92	98	19	Peloton
2000	"American Trilogy"	43	61	11	The Great Eastern
2000	"No Danger"	68	77	11	The Great Eastern
2002	"Coming in from the Cold"	55	82	19	Hate
2003	"All You Need Is Hate"	73	72	11	Hate
2004	"Everybody Come Down"	56	67	13	Universal Audio
2005	"Girls of Valour"	–	98	29	Universal Audio
"–" denotes items that did not chart or were not released in that territory.
