= Emma Pollock =

Scottish singer-songwriter and musician (born 1971)

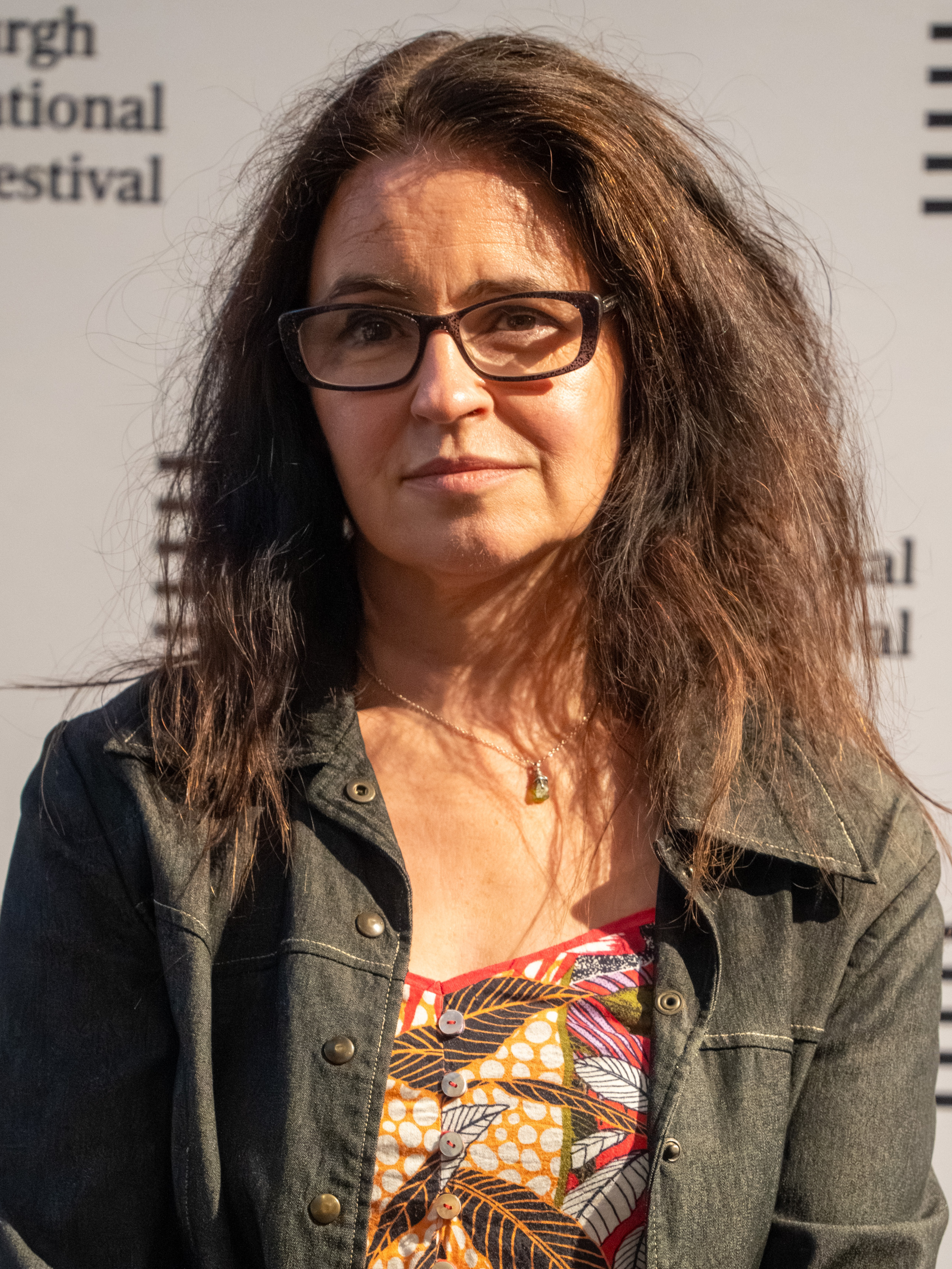
- Pollock in 2025

Background information
- Born: 14 August 1971 (age 55)
- Origin: Glasgow, Scotland
- Genres: Indie rock; folk
- Occupations: Singer-songwriter; composer; musician
- Instruments: Vocals; guitar; keyboards
- Years active: 1996–present
- Labels: 4AD; Chemikal Underground
- Member of: The Delgados
- Formerly of: The Burns Unit; the Fruit Tree Foundation
- Website: emmapollock.com

Emma Pollock (born 14 August 1971) is a Scottish singer-songwriter, musician, and a founding member of the bands The Delgados and The Burns Unit. She is one of the founders of The Fruit Tree Foundation project and a contributor to Vox Liminis, a project linking prison experience and songwriting.

== Career ==
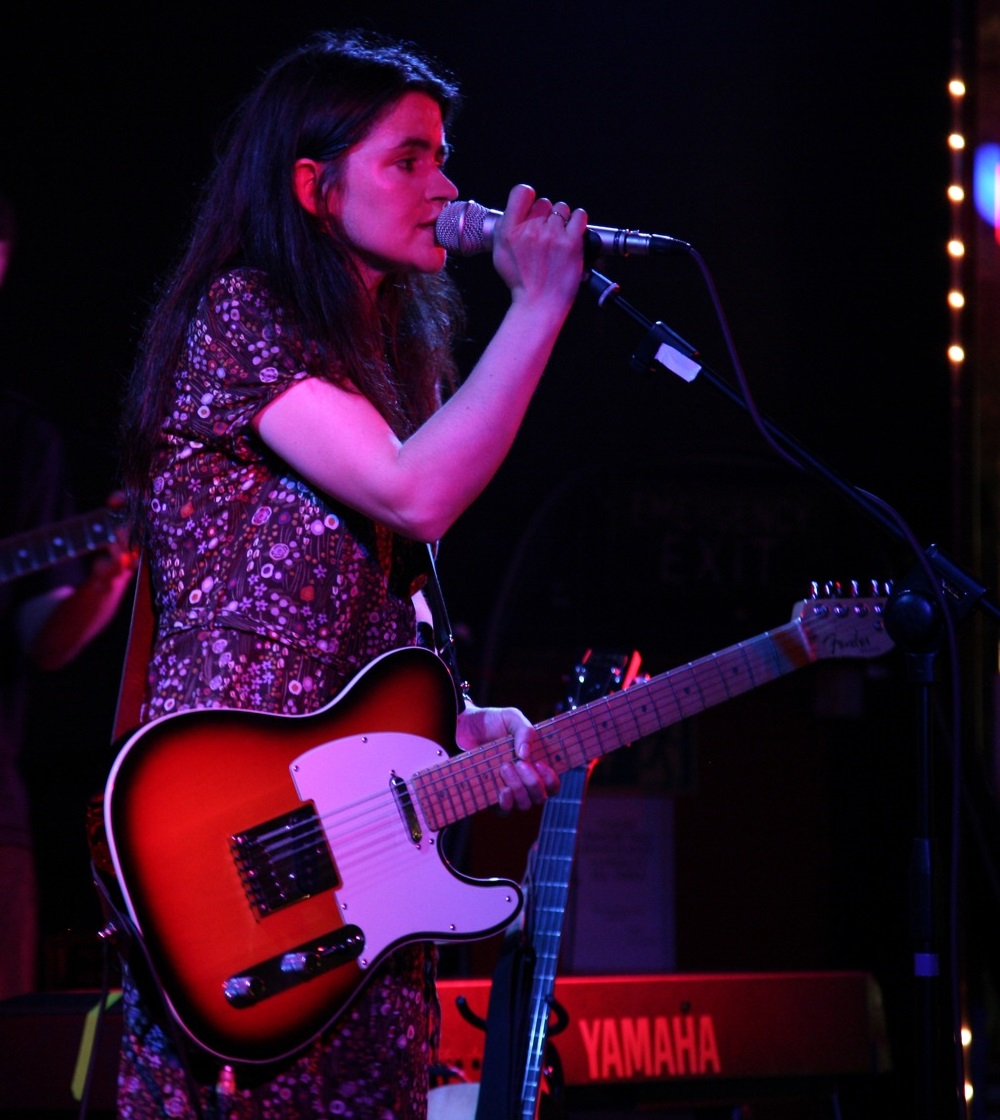
Pollock performing live at the Brudenell Social Club in Leeds, 2007

A founding member of the Delgados, Pollock signed a solo recording contract with British independent record label 4AD in 2005 after the break-up of the band. Her debut solo studio album, Watch the Fireworks, was released on 17 September 2007. Pollock has most recently been recording with Scottish-Canadian band The Burns Unit, along with Indo-Caledonian pop artist Future Pilot A.K.A., Karine Polwart, King Creosote, multi-instrumentalist Kim Edgar, drummer and producer Mattie Foulds, pianist Michael Johnston; and rapper MC Soom T. Pollock has also worked with David Gedge both in the studio and live as part of his Cinerama project.

On 3 August 2010, the Burns Unit released their debut studio album, Side Show, through Proper Distribution in the UK. Produced by the band's drummer Mattie Foulds, Side Show was mixed with Paul Savage and mastered by Jon Astley.

Pollock's third solo studio album, In Search of Harperfield, was released on 29 January 2016 on Chemikal Underground.

== Personal life ==
Pollock studied laser science and optoelectronics at the University of Strathclyde, graduating BSc (Hons) in 1993.

Pollock is married to musician and producer Paul Savage, also of the Delgados. They have a son.

== Discography ==
Studio albums

- Watch the Fireworks (17 September 2007)
- The Law of Large Numbers (1 March 2010)
- In Search of Harperfield (29 January 2016)
- Begging the Night to Take Hold (26 September 2025)

Singles and EPs

- "Adrenaline" (28 May 2007)
- "Acid Test" (3 September 2007)
- "Paper and Glue" (26 November 2007)
- "I Could Be a Saint" (22 February 2010)
- "Red Orange Green" (24 May 2010)
- "Parks and Recreation" (22 January 2016)

Other releases

- Side Show with Scottish and Canadian collective the Burns Unit (2010)
- Tour EP with RM Hubbert (Oct 2012)

Music videos

- "Adrenaline" (2007, directed by Blair Young)
- "Acid Test" (2007, directed by Lucy Cash)
- "Paper and Glue" (2007, directed by Moh Azima)
- "Red Orange Green" (2010, directed by Laura McCullagh)
- "Parks and Recreation" (2016, directed by Virginia Heath)
