= Chemikal Underground =

Scottish independent record label

- Founded: 1994
- Founder: The Delgados
- Genre: Post-rock; Post punk revival
- Country of origin: Scotland
- Location: Glasgow
- Official website: http://www.chemikal.co.uk

Chemikal Underground is an independent record label set up in 1994 at Glasgow, Scotland, by rock band The Delgados. It was set up to release their first single, "Monica Webster" / "Brand New Car" and went on to break many new Scottish bands in the nineties.

When the second Chemikal Underground release by Bis, The Secret Vampire Soundtrack EP was successful, earning them a slot on Top of the Pops, the label was able to expand. To date, The Secret Vampire Soundtrack is the only Top 40 hit released on Chemikal Underground. Further success followed with the debut albums by Mogwai and Arab Strap. Other bands on the Chemikal Underground roster included Magoo, Aereogramme, Cha Cha Cohen, Sluts of Trust, Suckle, the Radar Brothers and more recently Mother and the Addicts and De Rosa, as well as Arab Strap member Malcolm Middleton's solo work. In 2000, they launched Fukd ID to release limited edition (1000 each of CD and 12") singles by bands not necessarily on their roster, such as Interpol (Fukd ID #3).

== Artists ==
- Adrian Crowley
- Aereogramme
- Aidan Moffat
- Aloha Hawaii
- Angil & the Hidden Tracks
- Arab Strap
- Backwater
- Bis
- Broken Chanter
- Cha Cha Cohen
- Conquering Animal Sound
- De Rosa
- The Delgados
- Emma Pollock
- The Fruit Tree Foundation
- Holy Mountain
- Loch Lomond
- Magoo
- Malcolm Middleton
- Miaoux Miaoux
- Mogwai
- Mother and the Addicts
- Mount Wilson Repeater
- The Phantom Band
- The Radar Brothers
- Rick Redbeard
- RM Hubbert
- Sister Vanilla
- Sluts of Trust
- Suckle
- The Unwinding Hours
- Yatsura
- Zoey Van Goey

== Artists' opinions ==
Chris Connick from De Rosa stated that:

Chemikal Underground were a huge influence on my musical tastes when I was growing up. It was really exciting to hear bands such as Mogwai, The Delgados and Arab Strap, all guys who grew up in the same place as myself, write such amazing music, get played on the radio etc, and do it all off their own back. I hugely admire the members of The Delgados for starting Chemikal and affecting Scottish musical culture in such a positive manner. In fact, it was probably The Delgados that made me want to be in a band, so to have them as your ”boss” is a uniquely warm feeling. To even be considered in the same category as any of the label’s bands is a total honour and I am very proud to be linked to Chemikal Underground’s esteemed heritage.

While Rick Anthony, of The Phantom Band, noted that:

Chemikal Underground have been really pretty good to us so far and they have released some great records over the years - which makes you feel like they know what they are doing, and that they are in it for the right reasons. They all seem like good people as well, and they don’t meddle in the creative side of things at all.

== See also ==
- List of record labels
- List of independent UK record labels
