= Isobel Campbell discography =

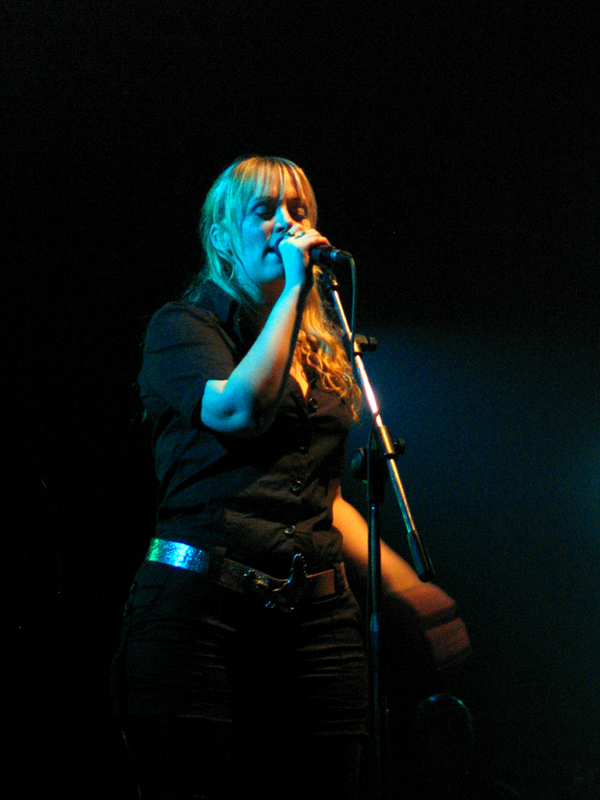
- Isobel Campbell performing in Bologna, Italy, on 31 January 2007
- Studio albums: 4
- Singles: 7
- Music videos: 2
- Collaborations: 3
- Other appearances: 11

Scottish musician and vocalist Isobel Campbell has released four solo studio albums, seven singles, a studio album in collaboration with Bill Wells and three with Mark Lanegan as well as several cameos on other artists' records. Isobel Campbell debuted in 1996 as cellist and sometime vocalist of indie pop band Belle & Sebastian. Despite limited commercial success, Belle & Sebastian have been hailed as the greatest Scottish band ever.

Campbell released two records under the pseudonym of The Gentle Waves whilst still a member of Belle & Sebastian, which she left in the midst of the band's 2002 North American tour. In 2003 she released Amorino, her first album under her own name, which received mixed reviews from critics. 2006 saw the release of Ballad of the Broken Seas, a critically acclaimed collaboration with Mark Lanegan which was later nominated for the Mercury Music Prize. This was followed by a solo album, Milkwhite Sheets, which spawned the single "O Love Is Teasin'". Campbell reunited with Lanegan to record Sunday at Devil Dirt, which was released on May 13, 2008.

== Studio albums ==
Year	Title
1999	The Green Fields of Foreverland^{[I]}: Released: 5 April 1999; Label: Jeepster (JR #4026); Format: CD, LP
2000	Swansong for You^{[I]}: Released: 6 November 2000; Label: Jeepster (JR #4051); Format: CD, LP
2003	Amorino: Released: 7 October 2003; Label: Snowstorm (ST #00020651); Format: CD, LP
2006	Milkwhite Sheets: Released: 23 October 2006; Label: V2 (V2 #1043452); Format: CD, LP
2020	There Is No Other: Released: 31 January 2020; Label: Cooking Vinyl (COOK720); Format: CD, LP, digital download
2024	Bow To Love: Released: 14 June 2024; Label: Cooking Vinyl (COOK909); Format: CD, LP, digital download

I Released under the pseudonym of The Gentle Waves.

== Extended Plays ==
Year	Title
2020	Voices In The Sky: Released: 7 August 2020; Label: Cooking Vinyl; Format: digital download

== Collaborations ==
=== With Bill Wells ===
Year	Title
2002	Ghost of Yesterday: Released: 17 June 2002; Label: Creeping Bent (CB #00027790); Format: CD

=== With Mark Lanegan ===
Year	Title	Peak chart positions								
Year	Title	BEL	FRA	ITA	IRE	NLD	NOR	SWE	SWI	UK
2006	Ballad of the Broken Seas: Released: 7 March 2006; Label: V2 (V2 #1035821); Format: CD, LP	15	96	27	21	32	51	56	—	38
2008	Sunday at Devil Dirt: Released: 13 May 2008; Label: V2 (V2 #1050622); Format: CD, LP	6	96	41	28	69	25	—	37	38
2010	Hawk: Released: 16 August 2010; Label: V2; Formats: CD, LP	—	—	—	—	—	—	—	—	29
"—" denotes a release that did not chart.

== Singles ==
Year	Song	Album
1999	"Weathershow"	The Green Fields of Foreverland
2000	"Falling from Grace"	Swansong for You
2004	"Time Is Just the Same"	Amorino
2006	"Ramblin' Man"^{[A]}	Ballad of the Broken Seas
2006	"Honey Child What Can I Do?"^{[B]}	Ballad of the Broken Seas
2006	"O Love Is Teasin'"	Milkwhite Sheets
2008	"Who Built the Road"	Sunday at Devil Dirt
2008	"Come on Over (Turn Me On)"	Sunday at Devil Dirt

Notes

- A Appeared in the UK Singles Chart at number 116.
- B Appeared in the UK Singles Chart at number 199.

== Music videos ==
Year	Song	Director
1999	"Weathershow"	
2000	"Falling From Grace"	
2006	"Ramblin Man"	Vrnda Daktor
2006	"Time Is Just the Same"	Vrnda Daktor
2019	"Ant Life"	Mike Aho
2019	"Hey World"	Mike Aho

== Other appearances ==
Year	Collaborations	Song(s)	Album	Ref.
1997	Snow Patrol	vocals on "NYC"	Songs for Polarbears	
1998	Arab Strap	cello on "The Clearing"	The Week Never Starts Round Here	
2001	Mount Vernon Arts Lab	cello on "The Black Drop"	The Séance at Hobs Lane	
2001	Future Pilot A.K.A.	vocals on "Ananda Is The Ocean"	Tiny Waves, Mighty Sea	
2002	Looper	cello on "Good Girls"	The Snare	
2004	Kinobe	vocals on "Luciole" and "I Am One"	Wide Open	
2006	Kama Aina	cello on "Millport" and "Club Kama Aina", cello and vocals on "Car Song"	Club Kama Aina	
2007	Paul Leonard-Morgan	vocals on "Wilderness"	Filmtales	
2007	Blanche	cello on "No Matter Where You Go..."	Little Amber Bottles	
2007	Pantaleimon	cello on "We Love", vocals, cello, piano and glockenspiel on "High Star"	Mercy Oceans	
2007	Annie Lennox	vocals on "Sing"	Songs of Mass Destruction	
2017	The Jesus and Mary Chain	vocals on "Song for a Secret" and "The Two of Us"	Damage and Joy	
