= List of one-hit wonders in Scotland =

This list covers songs which were one-hit wonders in Scotland by Scottish artists only and achieved only one top 40 hit. Most of the one-hit wonders in the UK charts were naturally also one-hit wonders in Scotland, as were several of the one-hit wonders in the United States.

== 1990s ==
- "Acid Folk" – Perplexer (1994)
- "Do What You Like" – Rezerection (1995)
- "Rok Da Bass" – Ultimate Bass (1995)
- "Bagpipe Anthem EP" – Strickly Verbal (1996)
- "Saved" – Octopus (1996)
- "Knockin' on Heaven's Door/Throw These Guns Away" – Ted Christopher (aka Dunblane) (1996)
- "I'd Like to Teach the World to Sing" – No Way Sis (1996)
- "Baby In Your Arms" – Nexus (1997)
- "Yodel in the Canyon of Love" – Do-Re-Mi with Kerry (1997)
- "Here We Go/Trippy" – Arab Strap (1998)
- "Will You Walk on By" – Donnie Munro with Holly Tomas (1999)

== 2000s ==
- "Wee Andy Webber Scottish Medley" – Dean Park (2000)
- "Close to You" – Marti Pellow (2001)
- "In My Heart is Where You Belong" – Natalie James (2002)
- "Caledonia" – Katie Targett-Adams (2003)
- "Christmas Is All Around" – Billy Mack (2003)
- "Hearts of Glory" – Craig Herbertson (2004)
- "You're Supposed to Be My Friend" – 1990s (2006)
- "Breathtaking Fight" – The Xcerts (2006)
- "We're All Going to Die" – Malcolm Middleton (2007)
- "The Haggis" – Clax (2009)

== 2010s ==
- Kerry McGregor – "Smile" (2012)
- Dougie MacLean – "Caledonia 2013" (2013)
- Jonathan Cordiner – "I'll See Your Face One Day" (2013)

== 2020s ==
- Margaret Mackie and Jamie Lee Morley – "My Way" (2020)
- Luke La Volpe – "Dead Man's Blues" (2020)
- Joshua Grant – "Edinburgh" (2020)
- King Creosote – "Susie Mullen / Walter de la Nightmare" (2020)

== Aggregate ensemble groups ==
The following is a list of aggregate ensemble groups. These are usually put together for charity purposes. The ones listed below are one-hit wonders in their respective line-ups, but most are primarily made up of Various Artists.

- "You'll Know Us By Our Noise" – Rangers F.C. (1994)
- "Purple Heather" – Scot Euro 96 Squad (1996)
- "Glasgow Rangers (Nine In a Row)" – Rangers F.C. (1997)
- "Jerusalem" – Keedie/England Cricket Team (2005)
- "Tribute To Jinky" – Various Artists (2006)

== See also ==
- Lists of one-hit wonders
- Music of Scotland
