= Hawk (Isobel Campbell and Mark Lanegan album) =

Studio album by Isobel Campbell and Mark Lanegan
- Released: 24 August 2010
- Recorded: 2009–2010
- Genre: Alternative rock, folk rock
- Length: 47:55
- Label: V2
- Producer: Isobel Campbell

Isobel Campbell and Mark Lanegan chronology
Sunday at Devil Dirt (2008)	Hawk (2010)

Isobel Campbell chronology
Milkwhite Sheets (2006)	Hawk (2010)	There Is No Other (2020)

Mark Lanegan chronology
Bubblegum (2004)	Hawk (2010)	Blues Funeral (2012)

Singles from Hawk
- 1. "You Won't Let Me Down Again" Released: 10 September 2010

Hawk is the third collaborative studio album by Scottish indie pop singer Isobel Campbell and American alternative rock musician Mark Lanegan, released on 24 August 2010 on V2 Records. Recorded throughout the United Kingdom and the United States, Hawk features a number of guest musicians, including folk singer Willy Mason, bassist Bill Wells and former Smashing Pumpkins guitarist James Iha.

== Reception ==
Professional ratings
Aggregate scores
Source	Rating
Metacritic	75/100
Review scores
Source	Rating
Allmusic	4/5 stars
BBC	Positive
Chicago Tribune	3/4 stars
Drowned in Sound	6/10
The Guardian	3/5 stars
Los Angeles Times	2.5/4 stars
Mojo	4/5 stars
NME	7/10
Slant Magazine	3.5/5 stars
Spin	6/10

Upon its release, Hawk received critical acclaim. At Metacritic, which assigns a normalised rating out of 100 to reviews from mainstream critics, the album received an average score of 75, based on 22 reviews, indicating "generally favorable reviews". Allmusic's Mark Deming awarded Hawk four out of five stars and added that Campbell and Lanegan "continue to merge their distinct but complementary styles while adding a few new edges to their approach." BBC Music reviewer Andy Fyfe referred to the duo as "a union that just keeps on giving" and called Hawk "teelier, more focused" and "its best album yet." In his review for the Chicago Tribune, Greg Kot gave the album three out of four stars and said the album had "a rich, insinuating sound", adding "there are also several twists that make this much more than just a rehash of a proven formula." Writing for Drowned in Sound, Alexander Tudor gave a mixed review, calling the album "the most energetic record yet from the pair" but adding that "some old weaknesses remain. Individually, and in collaboration, Campbell & Lanegan have always been limited to predictable melodies and chord progressions." Tudor rated the album six out of ten. Maddy Costa of The Guardian said "the pleasure of Campbell flitting like a will-o'-the-wisp in the cracks between Lanegan's fierce, parched growls is predictable now. Hawk impresses instead with its signs of Campbell's increased confidence as songwriter, arranger and producer", awarding the album three out of five stars.

Los Angeles Times reviewer Mikael Wood wrote a mixed review, awarding the album two-and-a-half out of four stars, and stating the duo are "still drawing power from the tension between her wispy indie-pop coo and his deep blues-grunge growl" but "Hawk works best when Campbell [...] nudges their collaboration into new territory: the lush, retro-'70s soul sound of "Come Undone" [...] or "Get Behind Me", a blast of raw, White Stripes-style garage rock." Mojo rated the album four out of five stars and said that the duo had "surpassed the Nancy Sinatra/Lee Hazlewood comparisons to create an intense, fluid sound that's uniquely their own." Ash Dosanjh of the NME awarded the album a seven out of ten rating, praising Campbell's songwriting and vocals but adding "what is unfortunate is that she allows Lanegan to utterly dominate their duets." Writing for Slant Magazine, Jesse Cataldo said "their habit of slipping into archetypal styles often makes them seem shiftless and phony" and it "often sounds more like a jukebox than an album" but added it is "done so professionally, with a crisp production and a serious devotion to the particulars of each style." In his review for Spin, Marc Hogan rated the album six out of ten and said "Hawk faithfully follows its predecessors' dusty Americana blueprint."

== Track listing ==
All tracks are written by Isobel Campbell except where noted.

No.	Title	Writer(s)	Length
1.	"We Die and See Beauty Reign"	Campbell, Jim McCulloch	2:56
2.	"You Won't Let Me Down Again"	Campbell, McCulloch	3:30
3.	"Snake Song"	Townes van Zandt	2:48
4.	"Come Undone"		5:44
5.	"No Place to Fall"	van Zandt	3:17
6.	"Get Behind Me"		5:09
7.	"Time of the Season"		4:28
8.	"Hawk"		2:28
9.	"Sunrise"		2:32
10.	"To Hell & Back Again"		4:46
11.	"Cool Water"		3:38
12.	"Eyes of Green"		1:51
13.	"Lately"		4:48
Total length:			47:55

iTunes bonus track
No.	Title	Length
14.	"Won't Be Sorry"	3:23
Total length:		51:18

== Personnel ==
All personnel credits adapted from Hawk's liner notes.

Performers

- Isobel Campbell – vocals (1–7, 9–12), piano (3, 5), autoharp (7), shaker (7), tambourine (10), producer, arrangement, mixing (1–8, 10–13)
- Mark Lanegan – vocals (1–4, 6, 7, 12, 13)

Other musicians

- Jim McCulloch – guitar (1–13)
- Dave McGowen – guitar (1, 2, 11), double bass (1–5, 11), bass (6–8, 10, 12, 13), harmonica (12)
- Peter Dombernowsky – drums (2, 3, 5–8, 10, 12, 13), percussion (11, 13)
- Jeff Fielder – guitar (2, 7, 13)
- James Iha – guitar (2, 10)
- Nikolaj Heyman – guitar (1, 8)
- Bill Wells – organ (6), piano (10, 12)
- Chris Geddes – organ (3, 4)
- Paile Hjorth – organ (3), accordion (12)
- Jason Bratile – banjo (3)

Other musicians (continued)

- Willy Mason – vocals (5, 11)
- Nina Violet – violin (5, 12)
- Makeda Francisco – vocals (13)
- Tisha Freddrick – vocals (13)
- Shreveport Massive – claps (8)
- Paul Leonard Morgan – arrangement (4, 7, 10)

Technical personnel

- Dave Paterson – engineer, mixing (2–4, 6, 7, 10, 13)
- Matthew Cullen – engineer, mixing (1, 5, 8, 11, 12)
- Chris Szczech - engineer, mixing (2, 4, 9)
- Geoff Allan – engineer, mixing (10)
- Kent Olsen – engineer
- Stuart Hamilton – engineer
- Cameron Meshell – engineer
- Alex Wharton – mastering

== Chart positions ==
Chart (2010)	Peak position
Belgian Albums Chart (Vl)	5
Belgian Albums Chart (Wa)	53
Dutch Top 100	54
Finnish Albums Chart	42
French SNEP Albums Chart	119
Greek IFPI Albums Chart	14
Norwegian Albums Chart	21
Swiss Hitparade Albums Chart	28
UK Albums Chart	29
US Billboard Heatseekers Albums	11
