= Philophobia (album) =

Studio album by Arab Strap
- Released: 20 April 1998
- Recorded: 1998
- Studio: CaVa Studios (Glasgow, Scotland); Chem19 (Glasgow, Scotland)
- Genre: Indie rock; slowcore; alternative rock
- Length: 65:44
- Label: Chemikal Underground
- Producer: Geoff Allan; Paul Savage

Arab Strap chronology
The Week Never Starts Round Here (1996)	Philophobia (1998)	Mad for Sadness (1999)

Singles from Philophobia
- 1. "Here We Go" / "Trippy" Released: 1998; 2. "(Afternoon) Soaps" Released: 1998

Philophobia is the second studio album by Scottish indie rock band Arab Strap. It was released on 20 April 1998 on Chemikal Underground.

Philophobia peaked at number 37 on the UK Albums Chart, as well as number 3 on the UK Independent Albums Chart.

The 2010 reissue edition of the album comes with an additional bonus disc.

== Critical reception ==
Professional ratings
Review scores
Source	Rating
AllMusic	3.5/5 stars
Drowned in Sound	10/10
The Guardian	4/5 stars
NME	8/10
Pitchfork	7.7/10
PopMatters	8/10
Rolling Stone	3.5/5 stars

NME named Philophobia the 17th best album of 1998. In 2012, Fact placed the album at number 91 on its "100 Best Albums of the 1990s" list.

== Track listing ==
All tracks are written by Malcolm Middleton and Aidan Moffat, except where noted

No.	Title	Writer(s)	Length
1.	"Packs of Three"		3:23
2.	"Soaps"		4:16
3.	"Here We Go"		5:04
4.	"New Birds"		6:27
5.	"One Day, After School"		5:01
6.	"Islands"		3:42
7.	"The Night Before the Funeral"		4:51
8.	"Not Quite a Yes"		3:42
9.	"Piglet"		6:48
10.	"Afterwards"	Middleton; Moffat; Adele Bethel	4:23
11.	"My Favourite Muse"		5:03
12.	"I Would've Liked Me a Lot Last Night"		7:26
13.	"The First Time You're Unfaithful"		5:38
Total length:			65:44

2010 reissue edition bonus disc
No.	Title	Writer(s)	Length
1.	"Packs of Three" (Peel Session 2)		3:46
2.	"Piglet" (Peel Session 2)		6:44
3.	"The Night Before the Funeral" (Peel Session 2)		5:05
4.	"Blood" (Peel Session 2)		6:12
5.	"Girls of Summer" (Live at T in the Park)		7:56
6.	"New Birds" (Live at T in the Park)		6:27
7.	"Here We Go" (Live at T in the Park)		5:32
8.	"Soaps" (Live at T in the Park)		5:30
9.	"Afterwards" (Live at T in the Park)	Middleton; Moffat; Bethel	5:40
10.	"I Would've Liked Me a Lot Last Night" (Live at T in the Park)		6:56
Total length:			59:48

== Personnel ==
Credits for Philophobia adapted from album liner notes.

Arab Strap

- Malcolm Middleton
- Aidan Moffat

Additional musicians

- Alan Barr – cello (1)
- Chris Geddes – Wurlitzer electric piano (1), Hammond organ (2)
- Stuart Murdoch – piano (2)
- Sarah Martin – violin (2)
- Gary Miller – bass guitar (2)
- David Gow – drums (2), organ (5)
- Alan Wylie – trumpet (7)
- Adele Bethel – lyrics (10), vocals (10)
- Cora Bissett – cello (12)

Production

- Geoff Allan – recording (1, 2, 3, 6, 7, 9, 13), engineering (1, 2, 3, 6, 7, 9, 13), production
- Paul Savage – recording (4, 5, 8, 10, 11, 12), engineering (4, 5, 8, 10, 11, 12), production

Artwork and design

- Adam Piggot – graphics
- Marianne Greated – painting

== Charts ==
Chart (1998)	Peak position
Scottish Albums (OCC)	34
UK Albums (OCC)	37
UK Independent Albums (OCC)	3
