= The First Big Weekend =

Single by Arab Strap

from the album The Week Never Starts Round Here
- B-side: "Gilded"
- Released: 1996 (UK)
- Studio: MCM Studios (Hamilton, Scotland)
- Genre: Indie rock, post-rock, spoken word
- Length: 4:52
- Label: Chemikal Underground; CHEM009 (UK, 7")
- Songwriters: Aidan Moffat; Malcolm Middleton
- Producer: Paul Savage

Arab Strap singles chronology
"The First Big Weekend" (1996)	"The Smell of Outdoor Cooking" (1996)

"The First Big Weekend" is the debut single by Scottish indie rock band Arab Strap. It was first released as a 7" single limited to 700 copies, then later on Arab Strap's debut album, The Week Never Starts Round Here, both released in 1996 on Chemikal Underground.

== Recording and lyrics ==
“The First Big Weekend” is, for the most part, a monologue spoken by Aidan Moffat while bandmate Malcolm Middleton plays guitar and a drum machine accompanies. The lyrics revolve around the events of a weekend in Glasgow and Falkirk, including going out to clubs and bars, watching international football and The Simpsons and trying to pick up girls. Towards the end of the song, Middleton sings: "Went out for the weekend, it lasted forever/got high with our friends, it's officially summer"; these are the only sung words in the song.

Fans have worked out that the titular weekend must have started on Thursday 13 June 1996, as the game where "the English had won 2-0" references the Euro 1996 match between Scotland and England that took place two days later.

== Reception ==
The song received considerable airplay on BBC Radio 1's Evening Session show. The show's host, DJ Steve Lamacq, described the song as the “best of the decade” and “the most perfect pop song ever”.

=== Legacy ===
An instrumental version of the song was used in a 1997 "statistics" ad for Guinness.

The song was placed at #187 on Pitchfork’s “Top 200 Tracks of the 1990s” list in 2010.

A rework of the song was released in 2016 to celebrate its 20th anniversary, produced by Miaoux Miaoux.

== Track listing ==
Songs and lyrics by Aidan Moffat and Malcolm Middleton.

- 7" (CHEM009)
1. "The First Big Weekend" – 4:52
2. "Gilded" – 2:40

== Personnel ==
- Aidan Moffat – vocals, drums
- Malcolm Middleton – guitar
- Paul Savage – producer
