= Waxing Gibbous =

Studio album by Malcolm Middleton
- Released: 1 June 2009
- Recorded: CaVa Sound Workshops, Glasgow
- Genre: kite
- Length: 61:17
- Label: Full Time Hobby
- Producer: Malcolm Middleton

Malcolm Middleton chronology
Sleight of Heart (2008)	Waxing Gibbous (2009)	Summer of ‘13 (2016)

Singles from Waxing Gibbous
- 1. "Red Travellin' Socks" Released: 18 May 2009; 2. "Zero" Released: 3 August 2009

Professional ratings
Review scores
Source	Rating
BBC (positive) link	(positive)
Scotsman	4/5 stars
Q	4/5 stars
The Quietus	(positive)
Pitchfork Media	(6.9/10)

Waxing Gibbous is the fifth studio album by Scottish singer-songwriter Malcolm Middleton, released on 1 June 2009 on Full Time Hobby. Middleton has stated that following the release of this album, and its subsequent tour, he will put his career as a solo artist on hold: "I want to try something new and then come back to this later on."

"Red Travellin' Socks" was released as a single on 18 May, on 7" vinyl. Middleton describes the track as his "own "Bohemian Rhapsody" and "(Don't Fear) The Reaper"."

== Release ==
In April 2009, Middleton revealed on his MySpace that he planned to release a new album:

My new record is ok, but I've just listened to Hysteria by Def Leppard and that's much better. I used to hate that album when I was sixteen but now I love it. I wonder when they changed it? Hold on, am I really trying to sell my album by saying it's not as good as Def Leppard? I should work for Saatchi & Saatchi. Anyway. Yes, my new album is called Waxing Gibbous and it'll be released on the 1st June. [...] Not much to say about it really, the proof of the pudding is in the eating etc. So buy it then eat it. And remember, illegal downloading of my music will further cripple my income, leading to an impaired lifestyle, resulting in fewer situations to be gotten into which encourage the writing of downbeat/miserablist songs. Meaning you'll have to do without me. Good luck! [...] Actually, Waxing Gibbous is much better than Hysteria.

A free Glasgow launch party took place on the eve of the album's release.

== Background and Recording ==
According to Middleton, "[the album] was recorded with Geoff Allan who did Into The Woods with me, as well as most of the Arab Strap records. There's the usual appearances by Barry Burns and Jenny Reeve, as well as King Creosote and The Pictish Trail from Fence Records, and also Stevie Jones, Michael Scanlin, and Scott Simpson from my live band. All together making a good racket."

== Track listing ==
1. "Red Travellin' Socks" – 5:20
2. "Kiss at the Station" – 4:59
3. "Carry Me" – 4:49
4. "Zero" – 6:03
5. "Stop Doing Be Good" – 5:04
6. "Don't Want to Sleep Tonight" – 5:56
7. "Shadows" – 5:00
8. "Ballad of Fuck All" – 5:43
9. "Box & Knife" – 5:51
10. "Made Up Your Mind" – 3:53
11. "Subset of the World" – 3:17
12. "Love on the Run" – 6:27

== Personnel ==
- Malcolm Middleton – vocals, guitar, various instruments, production
- Barry Burns – hammond organ ("Zero"), piano (tracks 3, 5, 7, 10 & 12)
- Stevie Jones – piano ("Red Travellin' Socks")
- King Creosote – vocals (tracks 1, 2, 3, 4, 5, 6, 7 & 8)
- The Pictish Trail – vocals (tracks 1, 2, 3, 4, 5, 6, 7 & 8)
- Jenny Reeve – violin ("Stop Doing Be Good"), vocals (tracks 1, 2, 3, 5, 7, 8, 9, 11, 12)
- Michael Scanlin – bass (tracks 1, 3, 5, 7, 12)
- Scott Simpson – drums (tracks 1, 2, 4, 5, 7, 9, 12)
- Geoff Allan – recording, mixing
- Noel Summerville – mastering
- Keira Rathbone – cover image
