= Cat's pajamas =

Cat's pajamas may refer to:

- The Cat's Pajamas: Stories, a 2004 a collection of short stories by Ray Bradbury
- The Cat's Pajamas, a children's book by Thacher Hurd
- "The Cat's Pyjamas", a song by Isobel Campbell on Amorino (album)
- The Cat's Pyjamas, a 1992 book by Norman Thelwell
- The Cat's Pajamas, a 2004 book by James Morrow
- The Cat's Pajamas, a 1926 American comedy silent film directed by William A. Wellman
