= The Last Romance =

Studio album by Arab Strap
- Released: 17 October 2005
- Studios: CaVa Sound Workshops (Glasgow, Scotland); Chem19 (Glasgow, Scotland)
- Genre: Alternative rock
- Length: 35:54
- Label: Chemikal Underground
- Producers: Geoff Allan; Paul Savage; Arab Strap

Arab Strap chronology
Monday at the Hug & Pint (2003)	The Last Romance (2005)	As Days Get Dark (2021)

Singles from The Last Romance
- 1. "Dream Sequence" Released: 2005; 2. "Speed-Date" Released: 2006; 3. "There Is No Ending" Released: 2006

The Last Romance is the sixth studio album by Scottish indie rock band Arab Strap, released on 17 October 2005 on Chemikal Underground.

Vocalist Aidan Moffat stated that the album is "a lot more upbeat, but still deals with some of the darker aspects of relationships. It's like the dark side in Star Wars though – quicker, faster, more seductive." Moffat also noted his desire for the album "to be shorter, more immediate. If our previous albums could be considered 'hard work', I wanted this one to be a slap in the face. I felt it was important we didn't make the same album over ten years, so this one was going to be more digestible and a lot louder."

Following the album's release, Arab Strap announced that it would be their last. Moffat stated that: "there’s no animosity, no drama. We simply feel we’ve run our course. The Last Romance seems the most obvious and logical final act of the Arab Strap studio adventure. Everybody likes a happy ending."

== Composition ==
The Last Romance maintains the snide lyrical style common to Arab Strap, while adding a more optimistic tone in certain songs, such as "There Is No Ending". There are only 3 acoustic songs on this album, which has a rock-oriented sound, with influences from bands like Mogwai.

The sleeve artwork on the front contains a collage designed by Australian illustrator Rik Lee, whose previous work features many of the images seen on the sleeve artwork. The inside contains the lyrics hand-written in a notebook-style layout.

== Release ==
The third single, "There Is No Ending", was released on 6 November 2006, and later as a 7" single limited to 1000 copies, both on Chemikal Underground.

== Reception ==
Professional ratings
Aggregate scores
Source	Rating
Metacritic	80/100
Review scores
Source	Rating
AllMusic	3.5/5 stars
Alternative Press	4/5
The A.V. Club	B+
Mojo	4/5 stars
NME	8/10
Pitchfork	8.0/10
PopMatters	9/10
Q	3/5 stars
Spin	B
Uncut	4/5 stars

In December 2009, The Skinny placed The Last Romance at number 25 on its list of "Scottish Albums of the Decade".

== Track listing ==
All tracks are written by Malcolm Middleton and Aidan Moffat.

No.	Title	Length
1.	"Stink"	2:16
2.	"(If There's) No Hope for Us"	3:57
3.	"Chat in Amsterdam, Winter 2003"	3:19
4.	"Don't Ask Me to Dance"	4:00
5.	"Confessions of a Big Brother"	3:36
6.	"Come Round and Love Me"	2:58
7.	"Speed-Date"	3:07
8.	"Dream Sequence"	4:15
9.	"Fine Tuning"	2:54
10.	"There Is No Ending"	5:33

US edition bonus tracks
No.	Title	Length
11.	"El Paso Song"	3:57
12.	"Go Back to the Sea"	3:53

== Personnel ==
Credits for The Last Romance adapted from album liner notes.

Arab Strap

- Malcolm Middleton – bass, guitar
- Aidan Moffat – vocals, drums, organ

Additional musicians

- Geoff Allan – vocals ("There Is No Ending")
- Alan Barr – cello ("Stink", "Confessions of a Big Brother")
- Barry Burns – organ ("Come Round and Love Me"), piano ("Dream Sequence")
- David Jeans – drums ("(If There's) No Hope for Us", "Don't Ask Me to Dance", "Speed-Date", "Dream Sequence")
- Nicola MacLeod – vocals ("(If There's) No Hope for Us", "Come Round and Love Me")
- Jon McCue – vocals ("There Is No Ending")
- Jenny Reeve – violin ("Come Round and Love Me", "There Is No Ending")
- Andrew Savage – vocals ("There Is No Ending")
- Allan Wylie – trumpet ("Speed-Date", "There Is No Ending")

Production

- Geoff Allan – recording, production
- Arab Strap – production
- Morten Bue – mastering
- Paul Savage – recording, production

Artwork and design

- Bulletproof ID – layout
- Rik Lee – illustrations

== Charts ==
Chart (2005)	Peak position
Scottish Albums (Official Charts)	68
UK Albums (Official Charts)	199
UK Independent Albums (Official Charts)	22
