= Elephant Shoe =

Studio album by Arab Strap
- Released: 13 September 1999
- Studio: CaVa Studios (Glasgow, Scotland); Apollo Studios (Glasgow, Scotland)
- Genre: Sadcore
- Length: 56:50
- Label: Go! Beat
- Producer: Arab Strap

Arab Strap chronology
Mad for Sadness (1999)	Elephant Shoe (1999)	The Red Thread (2001)

Singles from Elephant Shoe
- 1. "Cherubs" Released: 1999 (EP)

Professional ratings
Aggregate scores
Source	Rating
Metacritic	78/100
Review scores
Source	Rating
AllMusic	4/5 stars
Alternative Press	4/5
The Guardian	4/5 stars
NME	7/10
Pitchfork	8.4/10
Spin	8/10

Elephant Shoe is the third studio album by Scottish indie rock band Arab Strap, released on 13 September 1999 by Go! Beat.

The album's title is a phrase sometimes used by children who are afraid of saying "I love you", where they mouth "I love you" under their breath, but when asked what they had said, answer "elephant shoe" or elephant juice, because the mouth shapes are the same.

== Track listing ==
All tracks are written by Malcolm Middleton and Aidan Moffat

No.	Title	Length
1.	"Cherubs"	4:59
2.	"One Four Seven One"	5:28
3.	"Pyjamas"	4:39
4.	"Autumnal"	7:24
5.	"Leave the Day Free"	5:19
6.	"Direction of Strong Man"	4:23
7.	"Tanned"	6:31
8.	"Aries the Ram"	4:49
9.	"The Drinking Eye"	5:24
10.	"Pro-(Your) Life"	3:34
11.	"Hello Daylight"	4:17

== Charts ==
Chart (1999)	Peak position
Scottish Albums (OCC)	59
UK Albums (OCC)	79
