= Mad for Sadness =

Live album by Arab Strap
- Released: 3 May 1999
- Venue: Queen Elizabeth Hall (London, England)
- Genre: Alternative rock
- Length: 57:14
- Label: Go! Beat

Arab Strap chronology
Philophobia (1998)	Mad for Sadness (1999)	Elephant Shoe (1999)

Professional ratings
Aggregate scores
Source	Rating
Metacritic	82/100
Review scores
Source	Rating
AllMusic	3.5/5 stars
NME	8/10
Pitchfork	8.2/10

Mad for Sadness is a live album by Scottish indie rock band Arab Strap, released on 3 May 1999 by Go! Beat.

== Track listing ==
All tracks are written by Malcolm Middleton and Aidan Moffat, except where noted.

No.	Title	Writer(s)	Length
1.	"Intro/My Favourite Muse"		7:26
2.	"Packs of Three"		3:23
3.	"New Birds"		6:27
4.	"Toy Fights"		3:49
5.	"Here We Go"		5:04
6.	"Phone Me Tomorrow"		4:26
7.	"Girls of Summer"		8:21
8.	"Piglet"		6:48
9.	"Blood"		2:53
10.	"Afterwards"	Middleton; Moffat; Adele Bethel	4:23

== Charts ==
Chart (1999)	Peak position
Scottish Albums (OCC)	96
UK Albums (OCC)	138
