= 5:14 Fluoxytine Seagull Alcohol John Nicotine =

Studio album by Malcolm Middleton
- Released: 26 September 2002
- Recorded: Chem19 Studios; Hamilton, Scotland
- Length: 54:43
- Label: Chemikal Underground
- Producer: Paul Savage

Malcolm Middleton chronology
5:14 Fluoxytine Seagull Alcohol John Nicotine (2002)	Into The Woods (2005)

Professional ratings
Review scores
Source	Rating
Allmusic	4/5 stars
UNCUT	4/5 stars

5:14 Fluoxytine Seagull Alcohol John Nicotine is the debut solo album by Scottish singer-songwriter Malcolm Middleton, released on 26 September 2002 on Chemikal Underground.

== Overview ==
In 2002, Middleton, writing lyrics and singing for the first time, recorded and released 5:14 Fluoxytine Seagull Alcohol John Nicotine. Middleton has commented on the album, saying

Hearing those songs back and singing them over and over again on my own made me realise how pathetic a situation I was in and helped me to change it. Listening to it now is quite harrowing. I can hear an old friend who was severely depressed, desperate and unhappy.

== Track listing ==
All tracks are written by Malcolm Middleton.

No.	Title	Length
1.	"Crappo the Clown"	5:52
2.	"Wake Up"	3:35
3.	"The Loneliest Night of My Life Come Calling"	3:12
4.	"Best in Me"	7:30
5.	"Cold Winter"	5:39
6.	"Bring Down (Preprise)"	1:07
7.	"Rotten Heart"	3:27
8.	"Speed on the M9"	4:38
9.	"1, 2, 3, 4"	2:40
10.	"Birdwatcher"	5:01
11.	"The King of Bring"	7:07
12.	"Devil and the Angel"	4:55

== Personnel ==
- Malcolm Middleton – guitar, vocals
- Paul Savage – producer
- Aidan Moffat – vocals
- Emma Pollock – vocals
- Alun Woodward – vocals
- James Woods – vocals
- Geoff Allan
- Barry Burns – vocals
- Stewart Henderson – vocals
- Jenny Reeve – vocals

== Release history ==
5:14 Fluoxytine Seagull Alcohol John Nicotine was released in various countries in 2002.

Country	Release date	Record label	Format	Catalogue number
United Kingdom	26 September 2002	Chemikal Underground	CD	CHEM062
