= The Red Thread (Arab Strap album) =

Studio album by Arab Strap
- Released: 26 February 2001
- Studio: CaVa Sound Workshops (Glasgow, Scotland); Chem19 (Glasgow, Scotland); Apollo Recording (Scotland)
- Genre: Alternative rock
- Length: 56:53
- Label: Chemikal Underground

Arab Strap chronology
Elephant Shoe (1999)	The Red Thread (2001)	Monday at the Hug & Pint (2003)

Singles from The Red Thread
- 1. "Love Detective" Released: 2001; 2. "Turbulence" Released: 2001

Professional ratings
Aggregate scores
Source	Rating
Metacritic	75/100
Review scores
Source	Rating
AllMusic	4/5 stars
Drowned in Sound	8/10
Entertainment Weekly	B+
The Guardian	4/5 stars
NME	7/10
Pitchfork	6.9/10
Q	3/5 stars
Spin	7/10

The Red Thread is the fourth studio album by Scottish indie rock band Arab Strap, released on 26 February 2001 by Chemikal Underground.

== Background ==
Aidan Moffat of Arab Strap has commented on the title of the album, saying:

It's an Eastern belief that you're connected to your life partner by an invisible red thread and by that you will always find each other. It works both as a romantic thing and a comfort just in case it all goes wrong because you've still not followed the thread. It's relevant to the doubts that are expressed in some of the songs.

== Track listing ==
All tracks are written by Malcolm Middleton and Aidan Moffat.

No.	Title	Length
1.	"Amor Veneris"	3:46
2.	"Last Orders"	4:55
3.	"Scenery"	5:05
4.	"The Devil-Tips"	5:49
5.	"The Long Sea"	7:09
6.	"Love Detective"	4:00
7.	"Infrared"	6:11
8.	"Screaming in the Trees"	6:06
9.	"Haunt Me"	5:40
10.	"Turbulence"	8:14

== Charts ==
Chart (2001)	Peak position
French Albums (SNEP)	77
Scottish Albums (OCC)	86
UK Albums (OCC)	125
UK Independent Albums (OCC)	16
