= Falling from Grace =

Falling from Grace refers to an angel being banished from heaven, becoming a fallen angel. It can also refer to:

- Falling from Grace (film), a 1992 film
- Falling from Grace (EP), an EP by The Gentle Waves
- Falling from Grace (novel), a children's mystery novel by Jane Godwin

== See also ==
- Fall from grace (disambiguation)
