= The Week Never Starts Round Here =

Studio album by Arab Strap
- Released: 25 November 1996
- Recorded: MCM Studios (Hamilton, Scotland)
- Genre: Alternative rock; lo-fi
- Length: 49:36
- Label: Chemikal Underground
- Producer: Paul Savage

Arab Strap chronology
The Week Never Starts Round Here (1996)	Philophobia (1998)

Singles from The Week Never Starts Round Here
- 1. "The First Big Weekend" Released: 1996; 2. "The Clearing" Released: 1997

The Week Never Starts Round Here is the debut studio album by Scottish indie rock band Arab Strap. It was released on 25 November 1996 on Chemikal Underground. The album was reissued in 2010, with a bonus CD which includes the band's first session for John Peel, from March 1997 with guest appearances from Belle and Sebastian's Stuart Murdoch and Chris Geddes, and their first ever live gig, at King Tut's in Glasgow in October 1996, as recorded live for Peel's show.

In a 2009 interview, band member Malcolm Middleton stated that The Week Never Starts Round Here is his favourite Arab Strap release: "...it's completely undiluted and free from any self-expectations, which we later developed".

Arab Strap also included a song entitled "The Week Never Starts Round Here" on their 2003 album Monday at the Hug and Pint.

== Critical reception ==
Professional ratings
Review scores
Source	Rating
AllMusic	2.5/5 stars
Drowned in Sound	7/10
Pitchfork	6.8/10
PopMatters	7/10
Q	4/5 stars
Select	4/5

The Independent wrote that the album suggests "Tricky's fractured interior monologues, the new folk of Palace and Smog and the infamous unreleased tapes of Irvine Welsh setting his diary to the music of Joy Division, while actually sounding like nothing but itself."

== Track listing ==
All tracks are written by Arab Strap (Malcolm Middleton and Aidan Moffat).

No.	Title	Length
1.	"Coming Down"	3:35
2.	"The Clearing"	5:52
3.	"Driving"	2:11
4.	"Gourmet"	2:40
5.	"I Work in a Saloon"	2:35
6.	"Wasting"	3:42
7.	"General Plea to a Girlfriend"	1:44
8.	"The First Big Weekend"	4:53
9.	"Kate Moss"	4:50
10.	"Little Girls"	2:29
11.	"Phone Me Tonight"	4:28
12.	"Blood"	2:54
13.	"Deeper"	7:35
Total length:		49:36

2010 reissue edition bonus disc
No.	Title	Length
1.	"The Smell Of Outdoor Cooking" (Peel Session 1)	4:18
2.	"Soaps" (Peel Session 1)	4:09
3.	"I Saw You" (Peel Session 1)	3:39
4.	"The First Big Peel Thing" (Peel Session 1 - version of "The First Big Weekend")	3:32
5.	"Intro" (Live at King Tut's, Glasgow 1996)	2:02
6.	"General Plea to a Girlfriend" (Live at King Tut's, Glasgow 1996)	1:22
7.	"The Clearing" (Live at King Tut's, Glasgow 1996)	2:27
8.	"Kate Moss" (Live at King Tut's, Glasgow 1996)	2:32
9.	"Gilded" (Live at King Tut's, Glasgow 1996)	2:50
10.	"Driving" (Live at King Tut's, Glasgow 1996)	1:50
11.	"I Work In A Saloon" (Live at King Tut's, Glasgow 1996)	2:40
12.	"Phone Me Tonight" (Live at King Tut's, Glasgow 1996)	3:18
13.	"Blood" (Live at King Tut's, Glasgow 1996)	3:52
14.	"The First Big Weekend" (Live at King Tut's, Glasgow 1996)	3:59
Total length:		42:42
