= Monday at the Hug & Pint =

Studio album by Arab Strap
- Released: 21 April 2003
- Studio: CaVa Studios (Glasgow, Scotland); Seven-A (Scotland)
- Genre: Alternative rock
- Length: 45:00
- Label: Chemikal Underground
- Producer: Malcolm Middleton, Aidan Moffat, Geoff Allan

Arab Strap chronology
The Red Thread (2001)	Monday at the Hug & Pint (2003)	The Last Romance (2005)

Singles from Monday at the Hug & Pint
- 1. "The Shy Retirer" Released: 15 September 2003

Monday at the Hug & Pint is the fifth studio album by Scottish indie rock band Arab Strap. It was released in Europe on 21 April 2003 by Chemikal Underground and in the United States a day later by Matador Records. The album features appearances from Conor Oberst and Mike Mogis of Bright Eyes and Barry Burns of Mogwai, among others.

The title of the album refers to The Hug & Pint Bar and Club, formerly located in Falkirk, Scotland. An independent live music venue, "The Hug and Pint", on the Great Western Road in Glasgow, was later named after the album.

== Reception ==
Professional ratings
Aggregate scores
Source	Rating
Metacritic	80/100
Review scores
Source	Rating
AllMusic	3/5 stars
The Boston Phoenix	2/5 stars
Drowned in Sound	10/10
The Guardian	4/5 stars
Mojo	4/5 stars
Pitchfork	8.7/10
Q	4/5 stars
Rolling Stone	3/5 stars
Uncut	3/5 stars

In December 2009, Monday at the Hug & Pint placed at number 7 on The Skinny's "Scottish Albums of the Decade". Upon receiving the accolade, Malcolm Middleton stated:

It’s not our best record, but it does have a couple of good songs on it. I don’t really think about this album much, maybe I should go back and listen to it again.

The Twilight Sad vocalist James Graham lists the album amongst his favourite releases of the 2000s, noting that it was the first Arab Strap album he had listened to and the first album to make him realise that "it was OK to sing in your own accent", while praising Aidan Moffat as "one of the best lyricists of the past two decades".

== Track listing ==
All tracks are written by Malcolm Middleton and Aidan Moffat.

No.	Title	Length
1.	"The Shy Retirer"	4:21
2.	"Meanwhile, at the Bar, a Drunkard Muses"	2:25
3.	"Fucking Little Bastards"	6:15
4.	"Peep Peep"	3:10
5.	"Flirt"	3:22
6.	"Who Named the Days?"	4:22
7.	"{Loch Leven Intro}"	2:28
8.	"Loch Leven"	3:17
9.	"Glue"	3:12
10.	"Act of War"	4:10
11.	"Serenade"	3:50
12.	"The Week Never Starts Round Here"	2:17
13.	"Pica Luna"	2:56

== Charts ==
Chart (2003)	Peak position
Scottish Albums (OCC)	43
French Albums (SNEP)	150
UK Albums (OCC)	120
UK Independent Albums (OCC)	12
