= Fall from grace =

To fall from grace is an idiom referring to a loss of status, respect, or prestige.

Fall from grace may also refer to:

- Fall of man, in Christianity, the transition of the very first man and woman from a state of innocent obedience to God to a state of guilty disobedience
- Fallen angel, a wicked or rebellious angel that has been cast out of Heaven

== Literature ==
- Fall from Grace (Greeley), a novel by Andrew Greeley
- Fall from Grace (Collins), a novel by Larry Collins
- Fall From Grace: The Failed Crusade of the Christian Right, 1990 book by Michael D'Antonio
- Fall from Grace, a 2015 novel by Wayne Arthurson
- Fallen Grace, a novel by Mary Hooper

== Music ==
- Fall from Grace (band), a punk rock band which debuted in 2004

=== Albums ===
- Fall from Grace (Death Angel album), 1990
- Fall from Grace (EP), a 1997 EP by the band Ensign
- Fallen from Grace, a 2007 album by American hip hop group Insane Poetry
- Fall from Grace (Infernal album), 2010
- Fall from Grace (Borealis album), 2011

=== Songs ===
- "Fallen from Grace", a song from the 1990 album Brigade by Heart
- "Fall from Grace", a song from the 2013 album Searching by Jay Diggins
- "Fall from Grace", a song from the 2013 album Sequel to the Prequel by Babyshambles
- "Fallen from Grace", a song from the 1987 album Monolith by Amebix
- "Fallen from Grace", a 2008 song from MyEarthDream by Edenbridge
- "Fall from Grace", 1995 song from Amanda Marshall by Amanda Marshall
- "Fall from Grace", 2001 song from the album All in Hand by Rosemary's Sons
- "Fall from Grace", 2001 song from the Stevie Nicks album Trouble in Shangri-La
- "Fall from Grace", a song by Morbid Angel from their 1991 album Blessed Are the Sick
- "Elizabeth III: Fall from Grace", song from the album Karma by American power metal band Kamelot
- "Fall from Grace", a song from the 2002 album On a Wire by The Get Up Kids
- "Fall from Grace", a song from the 2011 album The Hymn of a Broken Man by Times of Grace
- "Falling from Grace", a song from the 1983 album A Child's Adventure by Marianne Faithfull
- "Falling from Grace, Pt. 1, Wake The Nightmares", song from the 2003 album "Soundchaser" by Rage
- "Falling from Grace, Pt. 2, Death Is On Its Way", song from the 2003 album "Soundchaser" by Rage
- "Fall from Grace", a song from album Singles by Future Islands

== Film ==
- Fall from Grace (1990 film), a 1990 film about Jim and Tammy Faye Bakker
- Falling from Grace (film), a 1992 film starring John Mellencamp
- A Fall from Grace, a 2020 film directed by Tyler Perry

== Other media ==
- Fall from Grace, a 1994 Daredevil story arc
- Fall-From-Grace, a character from the 1999 computer role-playing game Planescape: Torment
- "Fall From Grace", an episode in the TV series Shark
- "Fall from Grace" (House), a 2011 episode of the TV series House

== See also ==
- Falling from Grace (disambiguation)
- Fall to Grace (disambiguation)
