= A Brighter Beat =

Studio album by Malcolm Middleton
- Released: 25 February 2007
- Recorded: Castle of Doom Studio; Glasgow, Scotland
- Genre: Indie rock
- Length: 44:40
- Label: Full Time Hobby
- Producer: Tony Doogan

Malcolm Middleton chronology
Into The Woods (2005)	A Brighter Beat (2007)	Sleight of Heart (2008)

Professional ratings
Review scores
Source	Rating
AllMusic	link
Mojo	March 2007, p.98
The Observer	link
Pitchfork	(7.8/10) link
Q	March 2007, p.115
The Scotsman	link
The Times	link
NME	(7/10) link

A Brighter Beat is the third studio album by Scottish singer-songwriter, Malcolm Middleton, released on 25 February 2007 on Full Time Hobby. The album is the first Middleton solo release since Arab Strap's split in 2006.

== Overview ==
In 2006, after Arab Strap had split up after ten years together, Malcolm signed to Full Time Hobby and recorded A Brighter Beat. Malcolm has commented on the album, saying

If I was forced to describe it, which I am, I'd probably say it was a pop album for people who hate pop music. Or maybe I'd describe it as love songs for depressed people who find it hard leaving the house sometimes and worry too much about dying and the consequences of their daily actions and thoughts to be able to enjoy life fully.

The album cover is a photograph by Scottish artist David Shrigley

== Track listing ==
All tracks are written by Malcolm Middleton

No.	Title	Length
1.	"We're All Going To Die"	2:49
2.	"Fight Like The Night"	3:39
3.	"A Brighter Beat"	2:55
4.	"Death Love Depression Love Death"	4:44
5.	"Fuck It, I Love You"	3:48
6.	"Stay Close Sit Tight"	4:35
7.	"Four Cigarettes"	4:49
8.	"Somebody Loves You"	4:48
9.	"Up Late at Night Again"	5:35
10.	"Superhero Songwriters"	6:58

- "A Brighter Beat", "Fuck It, I Love You", "Fight Like The Night" and "We're All Going To Die" were released as singles.

== Personnel ==
- Malcolm Middleton – guitar, bass guitar, vocals
- Barry Burns – piano
- Jenny Reeve – violin, vocals
- Paul Savage – drums
- Mick Cooke – brass
- Tony Doogan – producer

== Release history ==
A Brighter Beat was released in various countries in 2007.

Country	Release date	Record label	Format	Catalogue number
United Kingdom	25 February 2007	Full Time Hobby	LP	FTH033
United Kingdom	25 February 2007	Full Time Hobby	CD	FTH033CD
