= As Days Get Dark =

Studio album by Arab Strap
- Released: 5 March 2021
- Studio: Chem19 (Glasgow, Scotland)
- Genre: Alternative rock
- Length: 47:19
- Label: Rock Action
- Producer: Paul Savage

Arab Strap chronology
The Last Romance (2003)	As Days Get Dark (2021)	I'm Totally Fine with It Don't Give a Fuck Anymore (2024)

Singles from As Days Get Dark
- 1. "The Turning of Our Bones" Released: 23 October 2020; 2. "Here Comes Comus!" Released: 2021; 3. "Fable of the Urban Fox" Released: 2021

As Days Get Dark is the seventh studio album by Scottish indie rock band Arab Strap, released on 15 March 2021 on Rock Action. It was their first album in 16 years (since The Last Romance) and their first since officially reforming in 2016.

== Overview ==
The usual lyrical preoccupations of Arab Strap—depravity, drinking and despair—are in evidence on As Days Get Dark, with allusions to voodoo ritual ("The Turning of the Bones") and Greek mythology ("Here Comes Comus!") alongside commentaries on immigration ("Fable of the Urban Fox"), social media ("Bluebird"), and emotional burnout ("Tears on Tour").

== Artwork ==
The album art depicts a personal computer desktop with two windows open, both displaying images. The 1886 painting "The Night Escorted by the Geniuses of Love and Study" by Pedro Américo is foregrounded, but clearly obscures a presumably pornographic image of a reclining figure clad in nylons and little if anything else. The back cover is similar, with what appears to be the same image this time obscured by both the track listing (in a bespoke Microsoft Word) and Lorenzo Costa's "The Reign of Comus".

== Reception ==
Professional ratings
Aggregate scores
Source	Rating
Metacritic	84/100
Review scores
Source	Rating
AllMusic	4/5 stars
NME	4/5
Pitchfork	8.0/10

As Days Get Dark was received positively, with some reviewers describing it as the band's best work.

== Track listing ==
All tracks are written by Malcolm Middleton and Aidan Moffat.

As Days Get Dark track listing
No.	Title	Length
1.	"The Turning of Our Bones"	5:03
2.	"Another Clockwork Day"	3:30
3.	"Compersion Pt. 1"	3:36
4.	"Bluebird"	2:52
5.	"Kebabylon"	5:15
6.	"Tears on Tour"	4:29
7.	"Here Comes Comus!"	4:14
8.	"Fable of the Urban Fox"	4:55
9.	"I Was Once a Weak Man"	3:27
10.	"Sleeper"	6:24
11.	"Just Enough"	3:33

== Charts ==
Chart performance for As Days Get Dark
Chart (2021)	Peak position
Scottish Albums (OCC)	1
Belgian Albums (Ultratop Wallonia)	109
Swiss Albums (Schweizer Hitparade)	48
UK Albums (OCC)	14
UK Independent Albums (OCC)	3
