= Into the Woods (Malcolm Middleton album) =

Into The Woods

Studio album by Malcolm Middleton
- Released: 13 June 2005
- Recorded: Chem19 Studios; Hamilton, Scotland
- Length: 46:29
- Label: Chemikal Underground
- Producer: Paul Savage

Malcolm Middleton chronology
5:14 Fluoxytine Seagull Alcohol John Nicotine (2002)	Into The Woods (2005)	A Brighter Beat (2007)

Professional ratings
Review scores
Source	Rating
Allmusic	4/5 stars
Almost Cool	(7.5/10)
Drowned in Sound	(8/10)
Mojo	5/5 stars
The Observer	4/5 stars
Pitchfork Media	(6.8/10)

Into The Woods is the second studio album by Scottish singer-songwriter, Malcolm Middleton, released on 13 June 2005 on Chemikal Underground.

== Overview ==
In 2005, Malcolm recorded and released the critically acclaimed album Into The Woods. The album was originally going to be called The Great Bear. The album featured guest appearances from Stuart Braithwaite and Barry Burns (of Mogwai), members of The Delgados, The Reindeer Section and Aidan Moffat. Malcolm has commented on the album, saying

Things all came to a head for me in 2001 when Arab Strap finished touring The Red Thread album. My life fell apart for the better and I didn't leave the house for six months. I wrote songs for comfort and to wallow in for a while.

== Track listing ==
Songs, lyrics and music by Malcolm Middleton.

1. "Break My Heart" – 4:14
2. "Devastation" – 3:23
3. "Loneliness Shines" – 4:19
4. "No Modest Bear" – 2:27
5. "Monday Night Nothing" – 3:27
6. "Bear With Me" – 6:08
7. "A Happy Medium" – 3:01
8. "Autumn" – 3:44
9. "Burst Noel" – 2:46
10. "Choir" – 4:54
11. "Solemn Thirsty" – 5:15
12. "A New Heart" – 2:51
- "Break My Heart" and "Loneliness Shines"/"No Modest Bear" were released as singles.

== Personnel ==
- Malcolm Middleton – guitar, vocals, producer
- Paul Savage – drums, engineer, producer
- Aidan Moffat – drums
- Alan Barr – cello
- Geoff Allan – engineer
- Barry Burns – piano, hammond organ, Fender Rhodes
- Stuart Braithwaite – guitar
- Jenny Reeve – violin

== Release history ==
Into the Woods was released in various countries in 2005.

Country	Release date	Record label	Format	Catalogue number
United Kingdom	13 June 2005	Chemikal Underground	LP	CHEM076
United Kingdom	13 June 2005	Chemikal Underground	CD	CHEM076CD
