= O Love Is Teasin' =

EP by Isobel Campbell
- Released: May 2006
- Recorded: 2006
- Genre: Folk
- Label: V2 records (UK); Instincts Records (US)
- Producer: Isobel Campbell

"O Love Is Teasin'" is an EP released by former Belle & Sebastian member Isobel Campbell. The album was released in May 2006. It brings traditional songs from United Kingdom and songs written by Campbell.

== Track listing ==
1. "O Love Is Teasin'"
2. "Yearning"
3. "Nottamun Town"
4. "Lady Of Snakes"
5. "Barbara Ellen"
6. "Black Is The Colour"
7. "Dabbling In The Dew"
