= Weathershow =

EP by The Gentle Waves
- Released: 22 March 1999
- Recorded: 1999
- Genre: Twee-pop
- Label: Jeepster Records (UK); Matador Records (US)
- Producer: -

Weathershow is an EP released by former Belle & Sebastian member Isobel Campbell under the name of The Gentle Waves. The album was released in March 1999.

== Track listing ==
1. "Weathershow"
2. "Evensong (french version)"
