= Lists of one-hit wonders =

The following articles contain lists of one-hit wonders, where a one-hit wonder is any entity that achieves mainstream popularity, often for only one piece of work, and becomes known among the general public solely for that momentary success.

- List of one-hit wonders in Ireland
- List of one-hit wonders in Scotland
- List of one-hit wonders on the UK Albums Chart
- List of one-hit wonders on the UK singles chart
- List of one-hit wonders on the UK Official Download Chart
- List of one-hit wonders in the United States
