= Everything's Getting Older =

Studio album by Bill Wells and Aidan Moffat
- Released: 26 April 2011
- Recorded: 2011
- Length: 39:17
- Label: Chemikal Underground
- Producer: Aidan Moffat, Paul Savage, Bill Wells

Professional ratings
Aggregate scores
Source	Rating
Metacritic	82/100
Review scores
Source	Rating
AllMusic	4/5 stars
Clash	7/10
Cokemachineglow	82%
Drowned in Sound	9/10
Mojo	4/5 stars
musicOMH	3.5/5 stars
Q	4/5 stars
Record Collector	4/5 stars
The Skinny	4/5 stars
Uncut	4/5 stars

Everything's Getting Older is an album by Scottish musicians Bill Wells and Aidan Moffat. Mojo placed the album at number 17 on its list of "Top 50 albums of 2011". On 19 June 2012 the album won the inaugural Scottish Album of the Year Award, beating artists such as Mogwai, Happy Particles and Remember Remember to the £20,000 prize.

== Track listing ==
1. Tasogare – 1:58
2. Let's Stop Here – 4:19
3. Cages – 2:25
4. A Short Song to the Moon – 1:03
5. Ballad of the Bastard – 2:42
6. The Copper Top – 5:22
7. Glasgow Jubilee – 3:57
8. (If You) Keep Me in Your Heart – 3:24
9. Dinner Time – 4:07
10. The Sadness in Your Life Will Slowly Fade – 3:17
11. The Greatest Story Ever Told – 4:19
12. And So Must We Rest – 2:24
