= I'm Totally Fine with It Don't Give a Fuck Anymore =

Studio album by Arab Strap
- Released: 10 May 2024
- Genre: Pop; indie rock
- Length: 46:13
- Label: Rock Action
- Producer: Paul Savage

Arab Strap chronology
As Days Get Dark (2021)	I'm Totally Fine with It Don't Give a Fuck Anymore (2024)

I'm Totally Fine with It Don't Give a Fuck Anymore (Note: Also stylised as I'm totally fine with it 👍 don't give a fuck anymore 👍) is the eighth studio album by Scottish indie rock band Arab Strap, released on 10 May 2024 through Rock Action Records. It was produced by Paul Savage and received positive reviews from critics.

== Critical reception ==
Professional ratings
Aggregate scores
Source	Rating
Metacritic	85/100
Review scores
Source	Rating
Clash	8/10
Mojo	4/5 stars
MusicOMH	9/10
Pitchfork	7.8/10
PopMatters	9/10
Uncut	8/10
Under the Radar	9/10 stars

I'm Totally Fine with It Don't Give a Fuck Anymore received a score of 85 out of 100 on review aggregator Metacritic based on nine critics' reviews, which the website categorised as "universal acclaim". Stuart Berman of Pitchfork wrote that Arab Strap "stand among indie rock's most astute observers of human behavior in the digital age" with the album, which "features some of their punchiest productions to date, expanding the cheeky 'disco Spiderland' template of its predecessor into more forceful displays of rhythm and discord". Joe Rivers of Clash felt that Arab Strap "remain experts at chronicling the world around them" on an album "full of piss and vinegar, but it's full of desire, regret and love, too".

Mojo described the album as "thrillingly raw" with the band "at their most streamlined, visceral and direct, disproving F Scott Fitzgerald's theory about second acts". Uncut wrote that "Arab Strap songs mostly have a strong, vinegary flavour, and this is a bracingly sour album over the long haul. The relentless misanthropic grind can drag in places. But as ever, Moffat's withering scorn is sweetened by beautiful poetry, tender emotion and self-aware, bruise-black humour".

PopMatters' Nick Soulsby found that I'm Totally Fine with It "has some of [Arab Strap's] most straight-rocking moments", particularly on "Allatonceness" and "Strawberry Moon", and called the album "such an eruption of creative energy from a band on a renewed jag of pure inspiration". Reviewing the album for MusicOMH, Ross Horton remarked that the band are "stronger than ever" with "morosely funny lyrics, and a pitch-perfect retro sound design that alternates between deadly serious and utterly comical". Michael James Hall of Under the Radar said that "these are pop songs, in a way, memorable, melodically awesome at times, but fed through an unrelenting mincer of misery".

== Track listing ==
I'm Totally Fine with It Don't Give a Fuck Anymore track listing
No.	Title	Length
1.	"Allatonceness"	4:28
2.	"Bliss"	3:52
3.	"Sociometer Blues"	3:43
4.	"Hide Your Fires"	3:07
5.	"Summer Season"	4:25
6.	"Molehills"	4:11
7.	"Strawberry Moon"	3:42
8.	"You're Not There"	3:00
9.	"Haven't You Heard"	3:11
10.	"Safe & Well"	4:34
11.	"Dreg Queen"	3:40
12.	"Turn Off the Light"	4:20
Total length:		46:13

== Charts ==
Chart performance for I'm Totally Fine with It Don't Give a Fuck Anymore
Chart (2024)	Peak position
Australian Digital Albums (ARIA)	16
Belgian Albums (Ultratop Flanders)	117
Scottish Albums (OCC)	2
Swedish Physical Albums (Sverigetopplistan)	17
UK Albums (OCC)	65
UK Independent Albums (OCC)	4
