= Bananas (Malcolm Middleton album) =

Studio album by Malcolm Middleton
- Released: 28 September 2018
- Recorded: May 2018
- Studio: Chem19 Studios; Blantyre, South Lanarkshire
- Genre: Indie/alternative
- Length: 41:00
- Label: Triassic Tusk Records
- Producer: Paul Savage

Malcolm Middleton chronology
Summer of '13 (2016)	Bananas (2018)	Guitar Variations (2020)

Professional ratings
Review scores
Source	Rating
The Arts Desk (positive)	
Sun Burns Out	9/10 stars
Echoes And Dust (positive)	
MusicOMH (positive)	

Bananas is the tenth studio album by Scottish singer-songwriter Malcolm Middleton, and the seventh under his own name. It was released on 28 September 2018 on Triassic Tusk Records.

== Cover and title ==
In an interview with For The Rabbits, an alternative music website, Middleton suggests that the title is "a stupid fucking name for an album" and dismisses any suggestion that it may be a nod to The Velvet Underground's debut album: "[T]he last few years I've started sketching, I mean I can't draw to save my life, but I started doing it and I was really bad but I found a lot of pleasure in doing it and the first thing I drew was these bananas".

== Background and Recording ==
Bananas represented a return to a more simple recording, and marked a clear departure from the sound of Middleton's previous record, Summer of '13. Speaking of the recording of the songs, Middleton said that "most of the songs on this record were written in two different days … feeling a certain way, feeling like shit and just mental things, that’s when words tend to come out for me. I don’t normally sit and write when I’m really happy”.

== Tour ==
Middleton toured the album as part of the Malcolm Goes Bananas winter tour in November and December 2018, and included gigs in the United Kingdom and Ireland.

== Track listing ==
All tracks written by Malcolm Middleton.

1. "Gut Feeling" – 5:30
2. "Love Is A Momentary Lapse In Self-Loathing" – 5:16
3. "What A Life" – 2:11
4. "Buzz Lightyear Helmet" – 8:09
5. "Twilight Zone" – 5:11
6. "That Voice Again" – 4:14
7. "Man Up, Man Down" – 5:58
8. "Salamander Gray" – 5:21

== Personnel ==
- Malcolm Middleton – vocals, guitars
- David Jeans – drums
- Stevie Jones – double piano
- Graeme Smillie - piano, synths, bass guitar
- Kenny Anderson, Jenny Reeve, Dan Wilson - backing vocals
- Paul Savage - additional drums
