= Music and Words =

Studio album by Malcolm Middleton
- Released: 15 December 2014
- Genre: Rock
- Length: 44:44
- Label: Melodic

Malcolm Middleton chronology
Human Don't Be Angry (2012)	Music and Words (2014)	Summer of '13 (2016)

Professional ratings
Aggregate scores
Source	Rating
Metacritic	60/100
Review scores
Source	Rating
Clash	6/10
The Guardian	3/5 stars
musicOMH	4.5/5 stars
Record Collector	3/5 stars

Music and Words is the seventh studio album by Scottish musician Malcolm Middleton. It was released in December 2014 under Melodic Records.

== Track list ==
No.	Title	Length
1.	"A Toast"	3:04
2.	"Houseguest"	5:32
3.	"Monkeys"	4:07
4.	"Walker"	2:32
5.	"Dear Brain"	2:06
6.	"Caveman"	5:23
7.	"Sunday Morning"	5:05
8.	"Story Time"	4:41
9.	"Help"	2:23
10.	"Touch My Face"	2:23
11.	"The Tree"	2:03
12.	"A Computer"	5:20
