= Fall to Grace (disambiguation) =

Fall to Grace is a 2012 album by Paloma Faith.

Fall to Grace may also refer to:

- Fall to Grace (film), a 2013 documentary film about former New Jersey Governor, Jim McGreevey
- Fall to Grace: A Revolution of God, Self & Society, a 2012 theology book by Jay Bakker
- "A Fall to Grace", an episode of Trapper John, M.D.

== See also ==
- Fall from grace (disambiguation)
- Fall of man, Biblical doctrine
