= Amorino (album) =

Studio album by Isobel Campbell
- Released: 7 October 2003
- Recorded: 2000–2002
- Genre: Twee pop, Jazz
- Length: 44:07
- Label: Snowstorm (UK); Instincts Records (US)
- Producer: Isobel Campbell

Isobel Campbell chronology
Swansong For You (2000)	Amorino (2003)	Ballad of the Broken Seas (2006)

Singles from Amorino
- 1. "Time Is Just The Same" Released: 12 April 2004

An amorino ("little love") is another name for a putto.

Professional ratings
Review scores
Source	Rating
Allmusic	4/5 stars
Pitchfork Media	(5.7/10)

Amorino is the first solo album released by Isobel Campbell following her departure from Belle & Sebastian. The album was released on 7 October 2003.

== Track listing ==
No.	Title	Length
1.	"Amorino"	3:45
2.	"The Breeze Whispered Your Name"	4:45
3.	"Monologue for an Old True Love"	3:41
4.	"October's Sky"	2:32
5.	"The Cat's Pyjamas"	2:23
6.	"Why Does My Head Hurt So?"	2:15
7.	"Johnny Come Home"	3:41
8.	"Poor Butterfly"	3:00
9.	"Love for Tomorrow"	2:48
10.	"There Is No Greater Gold"	4:08
11.	"This Land Flows with Milk"	4:19
12.	"Song for Baby"	3:49
13.	"Time Is Just the Same"	2:55

South Korea Bonus Tracks
No.	Title	Length
14.	"A Million Arms To Hold You"	3:29
15.	"The Cat's Pyjamas" (Alternative Version)	2:50
