= Dip (album) =

Studio album by L. Pierre
- Released: 6 February 2007
- Genre: Sound collage
- Length: 37:46
- Label: Melodic

L. Pierre chronology
Touchpool (2005)	Dip (2007)	I Can Hear Your Heart (2007)

Professional ratings
Aggregate scores
Source	Rating
Metacritic	63/100
Review scores
Source	Rating
The Guardian	3/5 stars
MusicOMH	4/5 stars
Pitchfork	5.9/10
Q	3/5 stars
Tiny Mix Tapes	2.5/5 stars

Dip is a studio album by Scottish musician Aidan Moffat, under his pseudonym L. Pierre. It was released in February 2007 under Melodic Records. The album is a departure from Moffat's earlier work, instead being a collection of sound collages.

== Track list ==
No.	Title	Length
1.	"Gullsong"	6:33
2.	"Weir's Way"	11:39
3.	"Gust"	3:15
4.	"Ache"	4:48
5.	"Hike"	3:46
6.	"Drift"	7:45
