= Sleight of Heart =

Studio album by Malcolm Middleton
- Released: 3 March 2008
- Studio: Chem 19 (Blantyre, South Lanarkshire)
- Length: 33:24
- Label: Full Time Hobby

Malcolm Middleton chronology
A Brighter Beat (2007)	Sleight of Heart (2008)	Waxing Gibbous (2009)

Professional ratings
Review scores
Source	Rating
Drowned in Sound	7/10 stars
NME	7/10 stars
Webcuts	3.5/5 stars

Sleight of Heart is the fourth studio album by Scottish singer-songwriter Malcolm Middleton, released on 3 March 2008 on Full Time Hobby. The album was recorded in the summer of 2007 at Chem 19 Studios in Blantyre.

== Artwork ==
Behind the CD there is a photograph of Middleton sitting in a chair, playing guitar. This same chair appears in the artwork to Middleton's previous album, A Brighter Beat, only the chair is empty.

== Track listing ==
Songs, lyrics and music by Malcolm Middleton except where mentioned.

1. "Week Off" – 3:33
2. "Blue Plastic Bags" – 3:25
3. "Total Belief" – 4:01
4. "Just Like Anything" – 2:36 (Jackson C. Frank)
5. "Follow Robin Down" – 3:02
6. "Stay" – 4:02 (Madonna/Stephen Bray)
7. "Marguerita Red" – 2:51 (King Creosote)
8. "Love Comes in Waves" – 7:05
9. "Hey You" – 2:49

== Personnel ==
- Malcolm Middleton – guitar, vocals
- Barry Burns – piano
- Jenny Reeve – violin, vocals
- Stevie Jones – double bass
- Paul Savage – drums, recording, mixing
- Greg Calbi – mastering

== Accolades ==
Publication	Country	Accolade	Year	Rank
The Pop Cop	Scotland	Top Ten Albums of 2008	2008	10
