= Ghost of Yesterday =

Ghost Of Yesterday

EP by Bill Wells & Isobel Campbell
- Released: July 2002
- Recorded: 2002
- Genre: Twee-pop
- Label: Creeping Bent (UK); Matador Records (US)
- Producer: -

Ghost Of Yesterday is an EP released by Scottish pianist Bill Wells and former Belle & Sebastian member Isobel Campbell. It covers songs by Billie Holiday. The album was released in July 2002.

== Track listing ==
1. "All Alone"
2. "Ghost of Yesterday"
3. "Who Needs You?"
4. "Please Don't Do It in Here"
5. "Preacher Boy"
6. "Tell Me More and More (And Then Some)"
7. "Somebody's on My Mind"
