= Milkwhite Sheets =

Studio album by Isobel Campbell
- Released: 23 October 2006
- Recorded: 2005
- Genre: Folk
- Label: V2 Records
- Producer: Isobel Campbell

Isobel Campbell chronology
Ballad of the Broken Seas (2006)	Milkwhite Sheets (2006)	Sunday at Devil Dirt (2008)

Professional ratings
Review scores
Source	Rating
Allmusic	link
Pitchfork Media	(5.7 / 10) link

Milkwhite Sheets is the fourth solo album released by former Belle & Sebastian member Isobel Campbell. The album was released on 23 October 2006. It brings traditional songs from United Kingdom and songs written by Campbell. She said the album was inspired by the works of Jean Ritchie, Anne Briggs and Shirley Collins.

== Track listing ==
All songs written by Isobel Campbell, except where noted.

No.	Title	Writer(s)	Length
1.	"O Love Is Teasin'"	Traditional	1:56
2.	"Willow's Song"	Paul Giovanni	4:22
3.	"Yearning"	Isobel Campbell	4:18
4.	"James"	Isobel Campbell	3:55
5.	"Hori Horo"	Traditional	2:20
6.	"Reynardine"	Traditional	2:53
7.	"Milkwhite Sheets"	Jim McCulloch	1:20
8.	"Cachel Wood"	Isobel Campbell	2:37
9.	"Beggar, Wiseman or Thief"	Isobel Campbell	3:13
10.	"Loving Hannah"	Traditional	3:18
11.	"Are You Going to Leave Me?"	Traditional	4:31
12.	"Over the Wheat and the Barley"	Isobel Campbell	2:33
13.	"Thursday's Child"	Isobel Campbell	8:04
14.	"Bird in the Wood" (Hidden Track)	Isobel Campbell	0:48

Japan Bonus Track
No.	Title	Length
2.	"Nottamun Town"	3:40
