= Fallen Grace =

Book by Mary Hooper

Cover of Fallen Grace

Fallen Grace is a book by Mary Hooper set in Victorian London in 1861. It is a story about two sisters, Grace and Lily Parkes, who are orphans as a result of the death of their mother and the absence of their father.

Grace takes on the role of mother to her older sister with a cognitive disability. They live in impoverished conditions until they are taken in by a wealthy family with ulterior motives.

This book has received positive reviews from Booklist, Kirkus Reviews, and The New York Times.
