= The Cat's Pajamas: Stories =

Short story collection

The Cat's Pajamas
- dust-jacket from the first edition
- Author: Ray Bradbury
- Language: English
- Subject: The Beautiful Cait Marie
- Genre: Short stories
- Publisher: William Morrow
- Publication date: July, 2004
- Publication place: United States
- Media type: Print (hardback)
- Pages: xix, 234 pp
- ISBN: 0-06-058565-X
- OCLC: 54677758
- Dewey Decimal: 813/.54 22
- LC Class: PS3503.R167 C37 2004

The Cat's Pajamas: Stories (2004) is a collection of short stories by Ray Bradbury. The name of its title story comes from a phrase in English meaning a sought after and fancy thing. Another collection by the same name was published in the same year by fellow science fiction author James Morrow.

== Contents ==
=== "Chrysalis" ===
A black boy is visiting one of his relatives in a beachside town for the summer. He befriends a white boy. They spend much time together in the sun, and the white boy grows darker. At the end of the summer the white boy's skin is darker than the black boy's skin. The black boy is very happy at this, until he peels the tan skin off of the white boy.

=== "The Island" ===
A paranoid family lives on the outskirts of a town. One night, they hear a person enter the house. They are all in separate rooms, and are too scared to collect in one room. The narrator hears a gunshot in each room where one of her family members is hiding. She hears the intruder try her door, and she dives out the window. A later investigation shows that the intruder walked calmly in and out of the house. The narrator is the only survivor.

=== "Sometime Before Dawn" ===
At a boarding house somewhere in the Midwest, two travelers stop and rent a room. They are not like all the other people there. Their clothes are futuristic. The narrator describes them as sad, and recalls hearing them crying in the night. The reader is led to believe that they are from the future, and that they are fleeing a horrifying future that is destined to arrive.

=== "Hail to the Chief" ===
The United States is gambled away by senators to a Native American tribe. The president rushes to the chief to try to bargain for the whole country back, and wins, but with one cost.

=== "We'll Just Act Natural" ===
A black woman and her mother are waiting for a grown white man who was raised in part by the old black woman. He has become a famous author and has promised to stop for a visit while en route to his play opening on Broadway. She insists that he will come, while her daughter is pessimistic about it. They watch his train arrive from afar. After a while, the younger black woman leaves as she assumes that he won't show. The older woman waits until the train leaves the station. She is phoned by her daughter later and lies about how she had a great time with him, with everything as perfect as she had imagined.

=== "Ole, Orozco! Siqueiros, Si!" ===
An art connoisseur is taken to a funeral for an artist. He is driven past some graffiti on the way there. During the service, he realizes that the artist was a graffiti artist and that the images displayed in the church are pictures of his graffiti. He then goes back with his friend to the original graffiti. He is convinced to help whitewash the originals so that it is never discovered that the art is graffiti.

=== "The House" ===
Maggie and William, a married couple, decided to move into an old house. William loved the old house and started to clean up the house. On the other hand, Maggie was not as enthusiastic as William. Maggie was not used to such a dirty house, because for most of her life she lived luxuriously. William had begun to notice that Maggie was not satisfied with the house and grew sad. William made a final decision and told Maggie that they weren't going to stay in the house. Then Bess, William's friend, comes for a visit and falls in love with the house. Maggie knew that William really loved the house and noticed how happy he was when he saw that he was not the only one who loved the old house. Finally, Maggie started to clean the house and convinced herself that if William was happy here, so could she. A stained glass window upstairs in the old house, diffracting sunlight, is representative of how an object can appear differently if viewed from another angle.

=== "A Careful Man Dies" ===
A hemophiliac, who is an author, presumably gets tricked by his former love in the process of writing a novel about her and her new love.

=== "Triangle" (in some editions this story is missing from the Table of Contents) ===
In a small town, a pair of aging sisters live together. Every day they pass a store where the third protagonist lives. One of them has a crush on him, and the other can't stand him. One day he comes over to talk to the sister with a crush on him. He asks her if he has any chance of having her sister's hand in marriage. She replies that he doesn't, but that she loves him. He tells her that he can't stand her, but loves her sister. So there is a love triangle that remains unsolved. Time passes them by.

=== "The Mafioso Cement-Mixing Machine" ===
A man decides to go back in time to save Scott Fitzgerald from himself. He wants Fitzgerald to finish writing The Last Tycoon. He plans to carry medicine through time, bribe some people, threaten others. The overall intent is to let Fitzgerald finish his masterpiece. The man goes back in time. After a while, the friend he let in on the secret goes to a bookstore and buys the completed Last Tycoon.

=== "The Ghosts" ===
Three girls think that some teenagers who have sex in their lawn are ghosts. They see their outlines in the grass in the morning. Their father does not like the intrusion and threatens to go out and shoot them. He moves poison ivy so that it is where the teenagers lie at night. The girls are distressed that the ghosts have stopped coming. They remove the ivy, and when "the ghosts" come the next time, one of them goes out. She finds out that there are no ghosts, just "nasty people". The girls believe that the ivy permanently scared away the ghosts and that the people only came after they removed the poison ivy.

=== "Where's my Hat, What's my Hurry?" ===
A man is leaving his wife because of all the times they were in Paris, they never had sex. He is sad that they never did it in the city of love. He gets two tickets to Paris and finds someone to go with him. He then leaves with no regrets.

=== "The Transformation" ===
A white man rapes a black woman. He is captured by several white men, unhappy with him for his transgressions. They take him to the carnival tattoo parlor. They then turn his skin all black. Then they leave him on his own to find his own way. They laugh about how ironic it would be if he ended up lynched.

=== "Sixty-six" ===
A police officer finds five people murdered and strewn along a stretch of Route 66 dressed in clothing that he classifies as 'dust bowl' era. As the investigation continues, he happens to see a picture of the five Okies in a magazine and discovers that they are just actors in period clothing. Riding his motorcycle into a dust storm back on the same stretch of Route 66, he finds a man who looks like he is from the Great Depression. The man admits to running over the people and wants to turn himself in, but the police officer says that he isn't going to take him in. The police man thinks the people who were killed deserved to die, and it was fitting that an Okie killed them for epitomizing the suffering the Okies went through.

=== "A Matter of Taste" ===
This is the only science fiction story in this collection. It is narrated by a seven-foot tall spider. A group of astronauts travel to a far away planet that is inhabited by a race of intelligent peaceable spiders. The captain gets a great scare the first day and is unable to represent the humans, so that responsibility falls to his underlings. The humans learn that the spiders are very peaceable and smart. Despite this they hint towards killing them simply because of the human fear of anything different.

=== "I Get the Blues When it Rains (A Remembrance)" ===
This is simply Ray Bradbury describing a night very special to him. He and a group of other writers got together and sang songs they all know. The magic of the night could never be recreated.

=== "All my Enemies are Dead" ===
A man learns that his last enemy has died. He gives up living, and is ready to die. Then one of his friends and employees starts telling him about all the terrible things he did to him. He becomes his employer's enemy, and in doing so, saves his life.

=== "The Completist" ===
A very rich man spends his life collecting books and art. He has dinner with a couple. He greatly enjoys talking continuously about his collection, and its great expansiveness. At the end of dinner, he bitterly asks, "Why did my thirty-five year old son kill his wife, destroy his daughter and then hang himself?"

=== "Epilogue: The R.B., G.K.C., and G.B.S. Forever Orient Express" ===
Poem by Bradbury about riding a train in the afterlife with G. K. Chesterton and George Bernard Shaw.
