= Time Is Just the Same =

Time Is Just The Same

EP by Isobel Campbell
- Released: 12 April 2004
- Recorded: 2004
- Genre: Twee-pop
- Label: Snowstorm records (UK); Instincts Records (US)
- Producer: Isobel Campbell

Time Is Just The Same is an EP released by former Belle & Sebastian member Isobel Campbell, featuring contributions by Mark Lanegan. The album was released in April 2004.

== Track listing ==
1. "Time Is Just The Same"
2. "Why Does My Head Hurt So?"
3. "Bordello Queen"
4. "Bang-Bang"
5. "The Breeze Whispered Your Name (pt.2)"
6. "Argomenti (live)"
