= The Green Fields of Foreverland =

Studio album by the Gentle Waves
- Released: 5 April 1999
- Genre: Twee pop
- Length: 30:50
- Label: Jeepster

The Gentle Waves chronology
The Green Fields of Foreverland (1999)	Swansong for You (2000)

Singles from The Green Fields of Foreverland
- 1. "Weathershow" Released: 22 March 1999

The Green Fields of Foreverland is the first studio album by Isobel Campbell's solo project, the Gentle Waves. It was released through Jeepster Records on 5 April 1999.

== Reception ==
Professional ratings
Review scores
Source	Rating
AllMusic	4/5 stars
Alternative Rock	6/10

Author Dave Thompson, in his book Alternative Rock (2000), wrote: "Sparse pianos and flutes echo low (and Low) and anyone who thought "Afterhours" was the best thing the Velvets ever did will have a brand new friend indeed."

It peaked at number 30 on the UK Independent Albums Chart, as well as number 89 on the Scottish Albums Chart.

The album was reissued on gold-coloured vinyl for Record Store Day in 2026.

== Track listing ==
No.	Title	Length
1.	"Hangman in the Shadow"	2:00
2.	"Evensong"	1:54
3.	"Renew & Restore"	3:18
4.	"Emanuelle, Skating on Thin Ice"	2:38
5.	"Rose I Love You"	1:53
6.	"Enchanted Place"	3:47
7.	"Tree Lullaby"	3:20
8.	"Dirty Snow for the Broken Ground"	2:42
9.	"Weathershow"	2:17
10.	"A Chapter in the Life of Mathiew"	4:23
11.	"To Salt a Scar"	2:44

== Personnel ==
Credits adapted from liner notes.

- Isobel Campbell – lead vocals, guitar, cello, piano, vibraphone, glockenspiel, melodica
- Margaret Smith – flute
- Richard Colburn – drums, shaker, triangle, bongo, cymbal
- Stuart Murdoch – bass guitar, synthesizer, backing vocals
- Stevie Jackson – guitar
- Mick Cooke – trumpet
- Chris Geddes – piano, Rhodes piano, autoharp
- David McKay – violin
- Moyra Clausson – clarinet

== Charts ==
Chart	Peak position
UK Independent Albums (OCC)	30
UK Scottish Albums (OCC)	89
