= We're All Going to Die =

Single by Malcolm Middleton

from the album A Brighter Beat
- Released: 10 & 17 December 2007
- Recorded: 2007
- Length: 2:49
- Label: Full Time Hobby
- Songwriter: Malcolm Middleton
- Producer: Tony Doogan

Malcolm Middleton singles chronology
"Fight Like the Night" (2007)	"We're All Going to Die" (2007)

"We're All Going to Die" is a song by Scottish singer-songwriter Malcolm Middleton, and the fourth single released from A Brighter Beat. The song was released on 10 December 2007. A limited-edition seven-inch record was also released at a later date.

Championed by Colin Murray and other BBC Radio 1 DJs, there was a campaign to make the song the Christmas number-one in the UK singles chart. The song was originally given odds of 1000/1 to reach the top spot by bookmakers William Hill, the longest odds they have ever given. The odds were later cut to 9/1, but in the event the song reached only number 31.

Regarding the song, Middleton notes that the song has "nothing whatsoever" to do with Christmas and that it is about "general life worries."

== Track listing ==
1. "We're All Going to Die"
2. "We're All Going to Die (Sportsday Megaphone Remix)"
3. "We're All Going to Die (The LK Remix)"
