= Falling from Grace (EP) =

Falling From Grace

EP by The Gentle Waves
- Released: 23 October 2000
- Recorded: 2000
- Genre: Twee-pop
- Label: Jeepster Records (UK); Matador Records (US)
- Producer: -

Falling From Grace is an EP released by former Belle & Sebastian member Isobel Campbell under the name of The Gentle Waves. The album was released in October 2000.

== Track listing ==
1. "Falling From Grace'"
2. "Going Home"
3. "October's Sky"
4. "Hold Back A Thousand Hours"
