= Sunday at Devil Dirt =

Studio album by Isobel Campbell & Mark Lanegan
- Released: 13 May 2008
- Recorded: 2007
- Genres: Indie pop; alternative rock
- Length: 47:19
- Label: V2
- Producer: Isobel Campbell

Isobel Campbell & Mark Lanegan chronology
Ballad of the Broken Seas (2006)	Sunday at Devil Dirt (2008)	Hawk (2010)

Singles from Sunday at Devil Dirt
- 1. "Who Built the Road" Released: 2008; 2. "Come On Over (Turn Me On)" Released: 2008

Professional ratings
Review scores
Source	Rating
AllMusic	4/5 stars
Drowned in Sound	5/10 stars
Pitchfork Media	(6.3/10)
Spectrum Culture	4/5 stars
Uncut	4/5 stars

Sunday at Devil Dirt is the second collaborative studio album by Isobel Campbell and Mark Lanegan, released 13 May 2008, through V2 Records. The album follows 2006's Ballad of the Broken Seas. Unlike the previous album, Lanegan flew over to Glasgow to record his vocal parts.

== Track listing ==
All tracks are written by Isobel Campbell except where noted.

No.	Title	Length
1.	"Seafaring Song"	3:32
2.	"The Raven"	4:59
3.	"Salvation" (Jim McCulloch)	3:19
4.	"Who Built the Road" (Campbell, McCulloch)	2:55
5.	"Come On Over (Turn Me On)"	4:41
6.	"Back Burner"	6:36
7.	"The Flame That Burns"	3:38
8.	"Shotgun Blues"	3:52
9.	"Keep Me in Mind, Sweetheart"	2:35
10.	"Something to Believe"	3:33
11.	"Trouble"	4:49
12.	"Sally, Don't You Cry"	2:44

2008 re-release bonus tracks
No.	Title	Length
13.	"Fight Fire with Fire"
14.	"Asleep on a Sixpence"
15.	"Violin Tango"
16.	"Rambling Rose, Clinging Vine"
17.	"Hang On"

Deluxe edition bonus CD
No.	Title	Length
1.	"Revolver" (live)
2.	"Carry Home" (live)
3.	"Willow's Song" (Paul Giovanni) (live)
4.	"Sand" (live)
5.	"(Do You Wanna) Come Walk with Me" (live)
6.	"The Circus is Leaving Town" (live)
7.	"Ramblin' Man" (Hank Williams) (live)

== Personnel ==
- Isobel Campbell – vocals, guitar, tubular bells, cello, vibraphone, piano, glockenspiel, tambourine
- Mark Lanegan – vocals
- Jim McCulloch – guitar
- Kirsty Johnson – accordion
- Ross Hamilton – double bass
- Duke McVinnie – bass
- Alyn Cosker – drums, loops
- Pam Smith – timpani
- Ross Hamilton – bass, double bass
- Bill Wells – bass
- Chris Geddes – organ
- Dave McGowan – piano, guitar
- David Paterson – guiro, percussion
- Dave McGowan – guitar, slide guitar, rhodes, organ, bass, steel guitar, piano
- Geoff Allen – percussion
- David Robertson – shaker, congas
- London Community Gospel Choir – backing vocals
- Greg Lawson – violin
- Dave Gormley – drums
