= Swansong for You =

Studio album by the Gentle Waves
- Released: 6 November 2000
- Recorded: 1999
- Genre: Orchestral pop
- Length: 36:14
- Label: Jeepster

The Gentle Waves chronology
The Green Fields of Foreverland (1999)	Swansong for You (2000)

Singles from Swansong for You
- 1. "Falling from Grace" Released: 23 October 2000

Professional ratings
Review scores
Source	Rating
AllMusic	4/5 stars
Entertainment Weekly	B
The Guardian	4/5 stars
Pitchfork	5.3/10

Swansong for You is the second studio album by Isobel Campbell's solo project, the Gentle Waves. It was released through Jeepster Records on 6 November 2000. It peaked at number 13 on the CMJ Radio 200 chart.

== Track listing ==
All tracks are written by Isobel Campbell.

No.	Title	Length
1.	"Let the Good Times Begin"	4:02
2.	"Partner in Crime"	3:45
3.	"Falling from Grace"	3:45
4.	"Loretta Young"	3:03
5.	"Sisterwoman"	3:00
6.	"Solace for Pain"	2:49
7.	"Flood"	3:35
8.	"Pretty Things"	4:35
9.	"There Is No Greater Gold"	4:04
10.	"There Was Magic, Then..."	3:31

== Personnel ==
Credits adapted from liner notes.

- Isobel Campbell – lead vocals, Cello, instrumentation
- Neil Humphrey – guitar (1)
- Pippa Tunnell – harp (1, 9)
- Nicola Boag – viola (1, 10)
- Greg Lawson – violin (1, 10)
- Clare McKeown – violin (1, 10)
- Murray Fergusson – violin (1 to 3, 10)
- Alastair Savage – violin (1, 3, 10)
- Paul Leonard-Morgan – string arrangement (1, 2, 10)
- Stuart Murdoch – bass guitar, violin arrangement (2 to 8, 10)
- Jonny Quinn – drums, percussion (2, 6)
- Cheryl Crockett – violin (3)
- Rozanne Suarez – backing vocals (3, 5, 7, 9)
- Ryan Smith – double bass (3, 5, 7, 9)
- Mick Cooke – guitar, trumpet, glockenspiel (3 to 8)
- Richard Colburn – drums, percussion (3 to 8)
- Chris Geddes – organ, piano (4 to 8)
- Stevie Jackson – electric guitar, shaker (4, 5, 7, 8)
- Jenny Divers – saxophone (5)
- Lindsay Watson – trombone (5)
- Diane Carnochan – backing vocals (5, 9)
- Eugene Kelly – backing vocals (6)
- Malcolm McMaster – steel guitar (6)
- Margaret Smith – flute, cymbal (7, 8)
- Ed McFarlane – double bass (8, 9)
- Helen McSherry – cello (10)
- David Scott – acoustic guitar, electric guitar (10)
- Ross McFarlane – drums, percussion (10)
