= Ballad of the Broken Seas =

Studio album by Isobel Campbell & Mark Lanegan
- Released: 7 March 2006
- Recorded: 2005
- Genre: Folk rock
- Length: 42:45
- Label: V2
- Producers: Isobel Campbell, Dave Paterson

Isobel Campbell & Mark Lanegan chronology
Ballad of the Broken Seas (2006)	Sunday at Devil Dirt (2008)

Singles from Ballad of the Broken Seas
- 1. "Ramblin' Man" Released: 2006; 2. "Honey Child What Can I Do?" Released: 2006

Professional ratings
Review scores
Source	Rating
AllMusic	4/5 stars
Drowned in Sound	8/10 stars
Pitchfork	(7.2/10)
Tiny Mix Tapes	3.5/5 stars

Ballad of the Broken Seas is an album by Isobel Campbell and Mark Lanegan, their first collaboration. It made the shortlist for the 2006 Mercury Music Prize and was one of NME's top one hundred albums of the decade.

The Mercury nomination provoked some criticism, as Lanegan was American and the award is for British and Irish artists only. However, Campbell wrote most of the tracks and produced the album. Campbell had written the music and some of the lyrics before sending it to Lanegan.

== Track listing ==
All tracks are written by Isobel Campbell except where noted.

No.	Title	Length
1.	"Deus Ibi Est"	2:51
2.	"Black Mountain" (music based in part on the traditional melody "Scarborough Fair")	3:10
3.	"The False Husband"	3:53
4.	"Ballad of the Broken Seas"	2:42
5.	"Revolver" (Mark Lanegan)	2:40
6.	"Ramblin' Man" (Hank Williams)	3:29
7.	"(Do You Wanna) Come Walk with Me?"	3:27
8.	"Saturday's Gone"	4:37
9.	"It's Hard to Kill a Bad Thing" (Jim McCulloch)	2:53
10.	"Honey Child What Can I Do?" (Campbell, Simon Shaw)	3:44
11.	"Dusty Wreath"	3:44
12.	"The Circus Is Leaving Town"	5:35

== Personnel ==
- Mark Lanegan - vocals
- Isobel Campbell - vocals, piano, cello, harpsichord, tubular bells, glockenspiel
- Alyn Cosker - drums
- Jim McCulloch - guitars
- Ross Hamilton - double bass (1,6–8), bass guitar (4,10,12)
- David Robertson - bodhran (1), percussion (8), congas (9)
- Bill Wells - bass guitar (2,3), piano (4), vibraphone (8)
- John McCusker - solo violin (4)
- Joshua Blanchard - acoustic guitar (5)
- Eddi Nappi - bass guitar (5)
- Norm Block - drums (5)
- Geoff Allen - whip (6)
- Claire Campbell - violin (8)
- Helen Thompson - harp (10)
- Chris Geddes - Hammond organ (12)
- Paul Leonard Morgan - string arrangements (3–5,9–10)
