= Arab Strap =

Scottish indie rock band

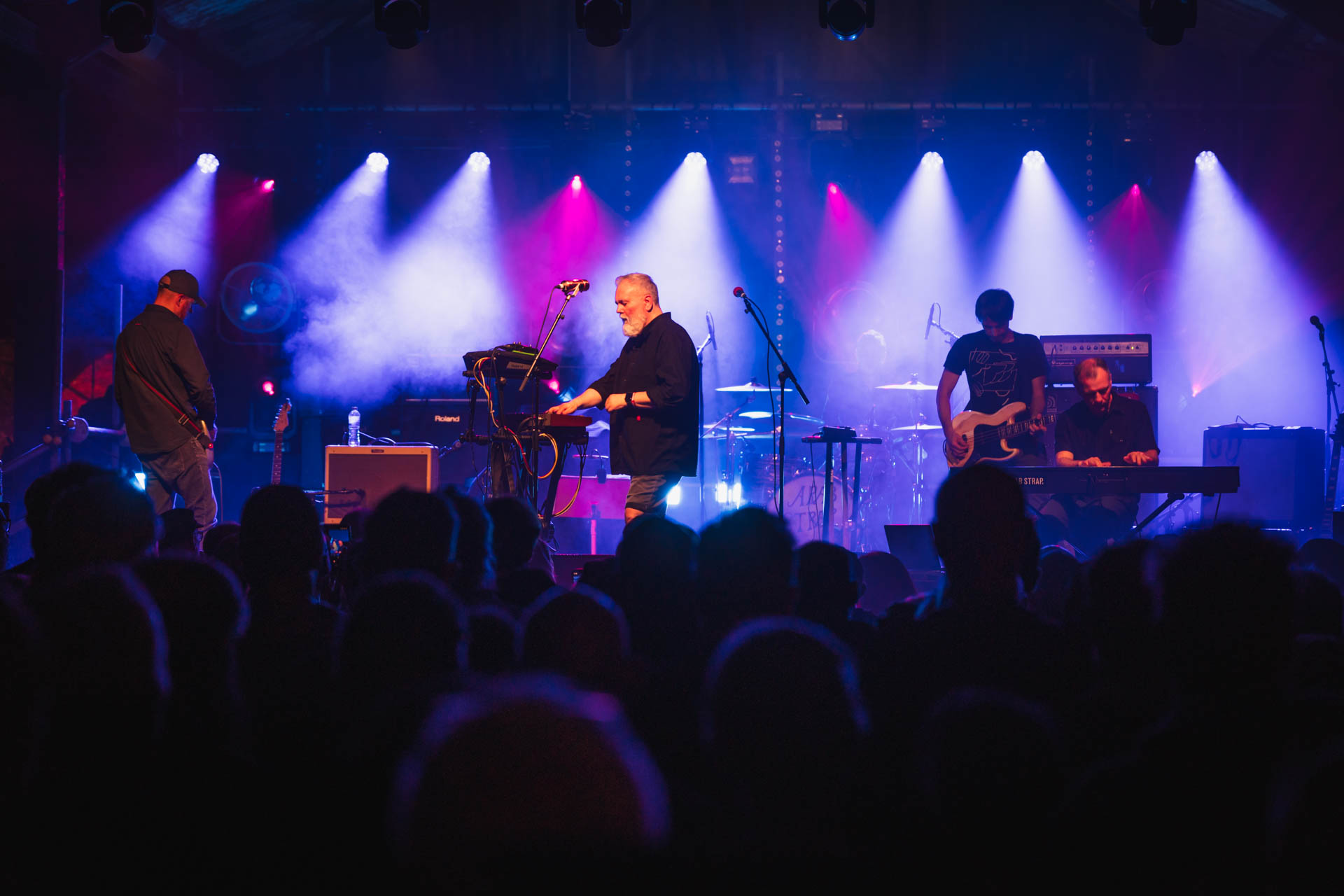
- Arab Strap at Krankenhaus, 2025

Background information
- Origin: Falkirk, Stirlingshire, Scotland
- Genres: Slowcore; indie rock; post-rock
- Years active: 1995–2006; 2011; 2016–present
- Labels: Chemikal Underground; Rock Action
- Members: Aidan Moffat; Malcolm Middleton
- Website: http://arabstrap.scot

Arab Strap are a Scottish indie rock band whose core members are Aidan Moffat and Malcolm Middleton. The band were signed to independent record label Chemikal Underground, split in 2006 and reformed in 2016. The band signed to Rock Action Records in 2020.

== Formation and early years ==
Vocalist and drummer Aidan Moffat and multi-instrumentalist Malcolm Middleton grew up in Falkirk, Scotland, and bonded over their mutual love for Drag City recording artists such as Will Oldham (who at the time recorded under the name Palace Brothers) and Smog. They first collaborated in 1995, and their debut album, The Week Never Starts Round Here, was released the following year. At this point Gary Miller and David Gow joined the band and became the rhythm section, creating a more dynamic live experience when the band toured.

Over the course of their first ten-year existence, Arab Strap worked with numerous musicians, including Jenny Reeve and Stacey Sievewright, as well as Adele Bethel, who went on to form Sons and Daughters. Stuart Murdoch of Belle and Sebastian featured on the album Philophobia, but the Belle and Sebastian album/song "The Boy with the Arab Strap" would later create something of a feud between Moffat and Murdoch.

Arab Strap's marked characteristics include sordid, personal, yet honest, lyrics – described by the NME as "fly on the duvet vignettes". Like fellow Scottish band The Proclaimers, their lyrics are sung in their native Scots tongue. At first essentially an electro-acoustic band with a brooding, spare sound, later albums and gigs saw them develop a fuller sound that drew deeply on both indie and dance music.

Arab Strap's first two albums, The Week Never Starts Round Here (1996) and Philophobia (1998), depicted the desperate decadence of post-Thatcherite Britain. The former album's "The First Big Weekend", a five-minute piece of drunken mayhem that end with a joyous singalong, "Went out for a weekend, lasted forever/Got high with our friends, it's officially summer," which was later also used as the chorus to "Hey!Fever," one of the tracks on the EP The Girls of Summer the following year. The 1999 live album, Mad for Sadness, demonstrated how the sometimes spare recorded sound of their early music could lift into a celebration of a sexually empty, drug- and alcohol-dependent life. After these albums, Arab Strap's music became much more musically polished, but continued to focus on drink, drugs, and existentially bereft versions of sexuality.

In keeping with the theme of sexual allusion, Moffat records as a solo artist under the name Lucky Pierre (later changed to L Pierre) – slang for the man in the middle of a gay threesome. This work is also characterised by a brooding, spare sound, but is instrumental in nature. Middleton also has a solo career under his own name, releasing two albums with Chemikal Underground and three more via Full Time Hobby Records.

On 9 September 2006, the band announced on their website that they were to split up. They celebrated the ten years since their first studio album with the release of a compilation record, Ten Years of Tears. They went on tour in Europe for the last time at the end of the year, and played their final show at the end of a secret tour of Japan at Shibuya O-Nest on 17 December 2006.

=== Post-breakup and 2016 reunion ===
In a 2008 interview, Middleton stated: "It was a good time to call it a day. Unless there's a definite need and desire for us to play, I don't think we should ever get back together. We always said we would [collaborate again] when we split up, but I think maybe it's still too soon. Maybe in a few years when we've got time, we'll maybe try something for a laugh. Who knows?"

In December 2009, Monday at the Hug & Pint, The Red Thread and The Last Romance entered The Skinny's "Scottish Albums of the Decade" list at no. 7, 12 and 25 respectively.

In April 2010, the Scenes of a Sexual Nature box-set was released, featuring early albums, live recordings, and a newly recorded track. The following year Moffat and Middleton released a cover version of Slow Club's new single, "Two Cousins", under the name "Two Cousins 1999". Moffat noted, "It's not an Arab Strap performance as such, rather it's the two guys who used to be Arab Strap recording their own, informed pastiche". On 17 November 2011, the band reformed for a one-off show as part of Glasgow venue Nice N Sleazy's 20th birthday celebrations.

In an interview in April 2013, Middleton said that he would be open to the idea of future gigs, but cast doubt on any more Arab Strap records: "I think, with Arab Strap, it was good at the time. But we could only write songs of that ilk at a certain age. So I don't think we'll ever record again but it might be good to do a gig".

On 11 June 2016, a new website for the band was revealed with a countdown and a lone statement, "Hello Again", teasing a reformation. Arab Strap confirmed on 15 June that they had reformed for three shows at London's Electric Brixton, Manchester's O_{2} Ritz and Glasgow's Barrowland Ballroom, all scheduled for October 2016, marking the band's 20th anniversary. With this announcement, the band released a new version of their debut single, titled "The First Big Weekend of 2016", as remixed by Miaoux Miaoux. They later added a second date in Glasgow (after the first one sold out in under half an hour) and a warm-up date in Newcastle. A string of festival dates in 2017 followed.

=== Return to full-time band ===
In August 2019, ahead of the release of his third studio album, Human Don't Be Angry, Middleton's website updated to state that they "[were] currently working on a new album for release in 2020". On 1 September 2020, the band issued their first new material in 15 years, with the release of the single "The Turning of Our Bones", which was reported to be the A-side of an upcoming 7", with the B-side of the single being "The Jumper".

On 24 November 2020, the band announced their seventh album, As Days Get Dark – their first in 16 years – would be released on Rock Action.

In February 2021, Arab Strap released the music video for "Here Comes Comus!". The controversial music video was directed by Bryan M. Ferguson.

As Days Get Dark was released on 5 March 2021. They have continued to gig since, both as a full band and as an acoustic duo featuring Moffat and Middleton. Middleton also started a new band with musician Joel Harries called Lichen Slow, who released their debut album in March 2023.

In September 2022, the song "The Turning of Our Bones" was used over the opening credits for the TV series Karen Pirie.

In March 2023, Arab Strap announced a string of acoustic gigs to mark the 25th anniversary of Philophobia, touring in late 2023 until January 2024.

In January 2024, the band announced their eighth studio album, I'm Totally Fine with It Don't Give a Fuck Anymore, with the first single "Bliss". The album was released on Rock Action on 10 May 2024.

The band's ninth studio album, Half-Told Tales, was released on 4 September 2026 on Rock Action. Released to critical acclaim, the album reached number one hundred on the UK Albums chart, number six on the Scottish Albums Chart, number six on the UK Independent Albums Chart and number fifteen on the UK Physical Albums Chart.

== Discography ==
Arab Strap discography
- Studio albums: 8
- Extended plays: 7
- Live albums: 3
- Compilation albums: 4
- Singles: 11

=== Studio albums ===
Title	Album details	Peak chart positions				
Title	Album details	SCO	EUR	FRA	UK	UK Indie
The Week Never Starts Round Here	Released: 25 November 1996; Label: Chemikal Underground (CHEM010)	—	—	—	—	—
Philophobia	Released: 20 April 1998; Label: Chemikal Underground (CHEM21)	34	92	—	37	3
Elephant Shoe	Released: 13 September 1999; Label: Go! Beat (547805)	59	—	—	79	—
The Red Thread	Released: 26 February 2001; Label: Chemikal Underground (CHEM050)	86	—	77	125	16
Monday at the Hug & Pint	Released: 21 April 2003; Label: Chemikal Underground (CHEM065)	43	—	150	120	12
The Last Romance	Released: 17 October 2005; Label: Chemikal Underground (CHEM082)	68	—	—	199	22
As Days Get Dark	Released: 5 March 2021; Label: Rock Action	1	—	—	14	3
I'm Totally Fine with It Don't Give a Fuck Anymore	Released: 10 May 2024; Label: Rock Action	2	—	—	65	4
Half-Told Tales	Released: 4 September 2026; Label: Rock Action	6	—	— (Note: Half-Told Tales did not enter the French Top Albums chart, but peaked at number 96 on the French Physical Albums chart.)	100	6
"—" denotes items that did not chart or were not released in that territory.

=== Live albums ===
Title	Album details	Peak chart positions	
Title	Album details	SCO	UK
Mad for Sadness	Released: 3 May 1999; Label: Go! Beat (547387)	96	138
The Cunted Circus	Released: 2003; Label: Arab Strap self-released (ASC001)	—	—
Acoustic Request Show	Released: 2005; Label: Arab Strap self-released (ASC002)	—	—
Primavera Sound: Live in Barcelona	Released: 2020; Label: Arab Strap self-released (no Cat ref)	—	—
Philophobia Dissected	Released: 2023; Label: Arab Strap self-released (ASP001CD)	—	—
"—" denotes items that did not chart or were not released in that territory.

=== Compilation albums ===
Title	Album details	Peak chart positions	
Title	Album details	SCO	UK Indie
Singles by Arab Strap	Released: 21 February 1999 (Japan only); Label: Bandai Music (APCY-8473)	—	—
Ten Years of Tears	Released: 23 October 2006; Label: Chemikal Underground (CHEM095)	—	29
Scenes of a Sexual Nature	Released: 17 April 2010; Label: Chemikal Underground (CHEM134)	—	—
Arab Strap	Released: 30 September 2016; Label: Chemikal Underground (CHEM244)	89	—
"—" denotes items that did not chart or were not released in that territory.

=== Extended plays ===
Title	EP details	Peak chart positions						
Title	EP details	SCO Albums	SCO Singles	UK Albums	UK Budget Albums	UK Indie Albums	UK Indie Singles	UK Singles
The Girls of Summer	Released: 1 September 1997; Label: Chemikal Underground (CHEM017)	—	43	—	—	—	—	74
Live	Released: April 1998; Label: Too Many Cooks (BROTH001)	—	—	—	—	—	—	—
Cherubs	Released: 23 August 1999; Label: Go! Beat (561263)	58	—	—	5	—	—	—
Fukd ID 2	Released: 13 November 2000; Label: Chemikal Underground	—	—	163	—	—	—	—
Quiet Violence	Released: 2002; Label: Arab Strap self-released (ASTRIP001)	—	—	—	—	—	—	—
The Shy Retirer	Released: 15 September 2003; Label: Chemikal Underground (CHEM067)	—	—	—	25	34	—	—
Speed-Date	Released: 12 February 2006; Label: Chemikal Underground (CHEM086)	—	92	—	—	—	46	—
"—" denotes items that did not chart or were not released in that territory.

=== Singles ===
Title	Year	Peak chart positions			Album
Title	Year	SCO	UK	UK Indie	Album
"The First Big Weekend"	1996	—	—	—	The Week Never Starts Round Here
"The Clearing"	1997	100	184	—	The Week Never Starts Round Here
"The Smell of Outdoor Cooking"	1997	—	—	—	Non-album single
"Here We Go/Trippy"	1998	32	48	5	Philophobia
"(Afternoon) Soaps"	1998	48	74	11	Philophobia
"To All a Good Night"	2000	—	—	—	Non-album single
"Love Detective"	2001	65	66	14	The Red Thread
"Turbulence" (mixes)	2001	92	81	16	The Red Thread
"Dream Sequence"	2005	90	—	—	The Last Romance
"There Is No Ending"	2006	—	—	—	The Last Romance
"The Turning of Our Bones"	2020	12 (Note: The chart consisted of just physical sales at that point.)	—	—	As Days Get Dark
"Here Comes Comus!"	2021	—	—	—	As Days Get Dark
"Fable of the Urban Fox"	2021	—	—	—	As Days Get Dark
"Aphelion"	2022	—	—	—	Non-album single
"—" denotes items that did not chart or were not released in that territory.
