= Bill Wells (musician) =

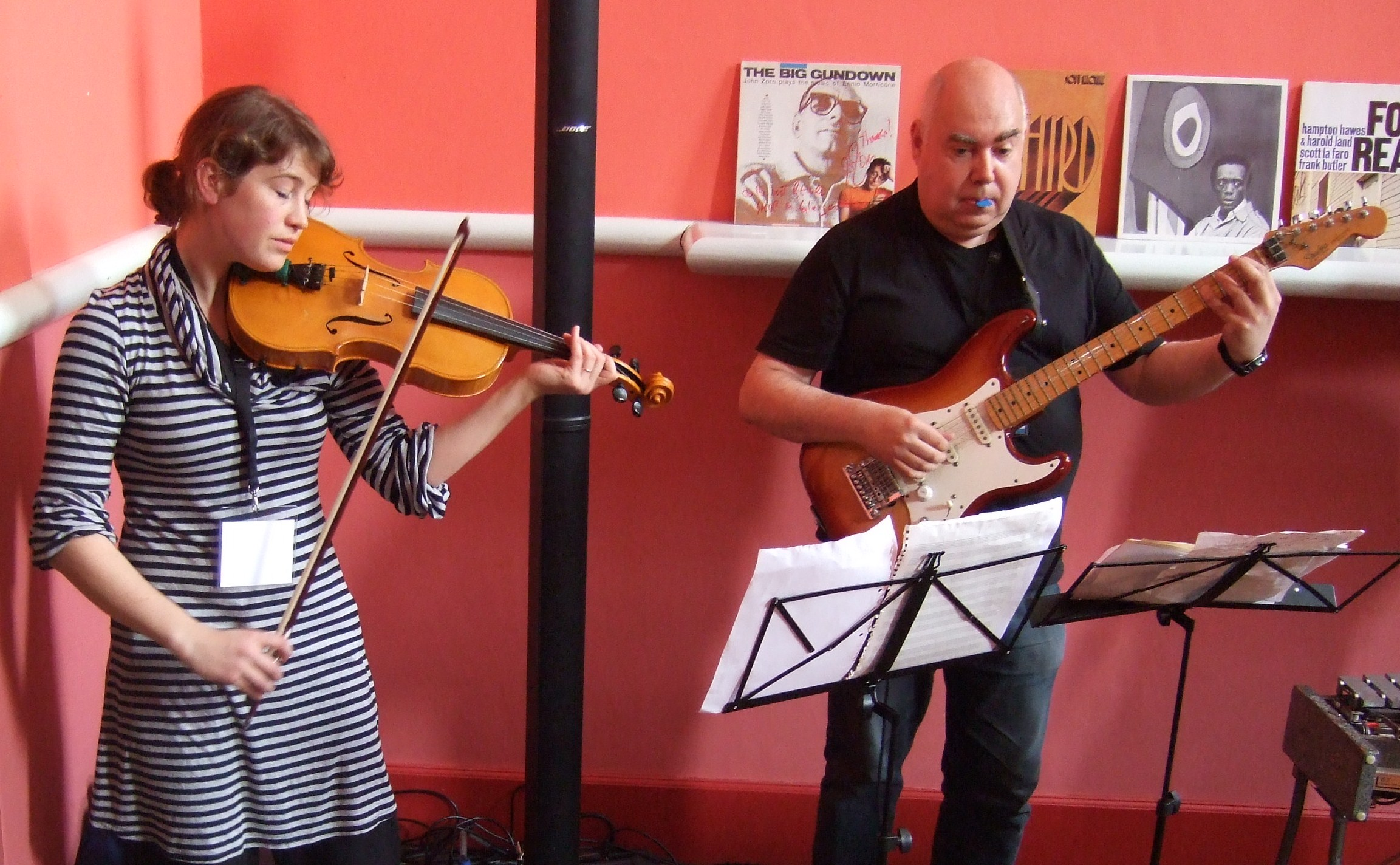
- Bill Wells with Aby Vulliamy, National Jazz Trio of Scotland, Stirling, May 2008

Background information
- Born: c. 1963 (age 62–63); Falkirk, Scotland
- Genre: Jazz
- Instruments: Bass, Guitar, Piano
- Labels: Geographic Music, Double Six, Domino Records
- Formerly of: Bill Wells Octet; Maher Shalal Hash Baz; Future Pilot A.K.A.

Bill Wells (born c. 1963) is a Scottish bassist, pianist, guitarist and composer.

== Biography ==
Wells is completely self-taught, and began performing in clubs in Scotland in the late 1980s. He began arranging his own work and initially offered these to Bobby Wishart, but when Wishart declined the offer, Wells formed his own Bill Wells Octet, which has included Lindsay Cooper, Alastair Morrow, Robert Henderson, John Longbotham, Phil and Tom Bancroft. Wells' style of experimental jazz takes influences from Brian Wilson, Burt Bacharach, Gil Evans, and Charles Mingus.

Wells has collaborated with several prominent Scottish independent rock and pop musicians, including with David Keenan of Telstar Ponies and John Hogarty of BMX Bandits in the group Phantom Engineer, and with Stevie Jackson and Isobel Campbell of Belle & Sebastian in live performances and also in the studio; Wells recorded the Ghost of Yesterday album with Campbell, and Jackson played on Wells' Incorrect Practice album.

During 2006 he received a Scottish Arts Council 'Tune Up' commission for a tour of Scotland.

== Discography ==
Stefan Schneider

- Pianotapes

Solo

- The Viaduct Tuba Trio Plays The Music of Bill Wells
- Lemondale

With Phantom Engineer

- Phantom Engineer (1996)

With Future Pilot A.K.A.

- The Bill Wells Octet Vs. Future Pilot A.K.A. (1999) Domino

The Bill Wells Trio

- Incorrect Practice (2000) Geographic
- Also in White (2002) Geographic

With Isobel Campbell

- Ghost of Yesterday (2002) Creeping Bent

With Maher Shalal Hash Baz

- Osaka Bridge
- GOK (2009) Geographic

With Tape

- Fugue (2010) Thrill Jockey

With Aidan Moffat

- Everything's Getting Older (2011)
- The Most Important Place in the World (2015)

As Bill Wells & Friends

- Nursery Rhymes (2015)

EP

- Dilf_77 would like to chat
- Cruel summer
