= Isobel Campbell =

Scottish singer

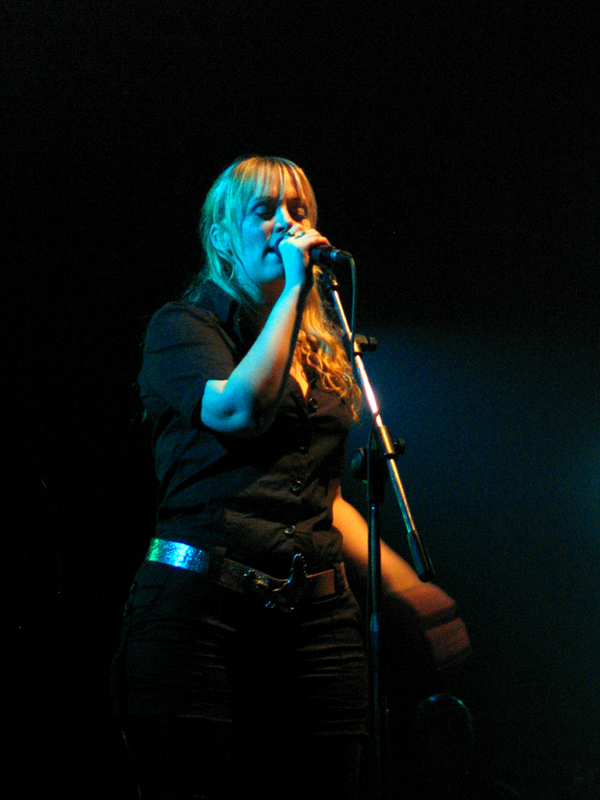
- Campbell in 2007

Background information
- Also known as: The Gentle Waves
- Born: 27 April 1976 (age 50); Glasgow, Scotland
- Genres: Indie pop; alternative rock
- Occupations: Singer; songwriter; musician
- Instruments: Vocals; cello; piano; guitar
- Years active: 1996–present
- Labels: V2; Jeepster; Cooking Vinyl
- Website: isobelcampbell.com

Isobel Campbell (born 27 April 1976) is a Scottish singer, songwriter and cellist. She rose to prominence at age nineteen as a member of the indie pop band Belle & Sebastian, but left the group to pursue a solo career, first as the Gentle Waves, and later under her own name. She later collaborated with singer Mark Lanegan on three albums. Her latest studio album, Bow To Love, was released in 2024.

Campbell's music has been described as either indie pop, chamber pop or singer-songwriter. Regardless of genre, Campbell makes gentle and sombre music, often using classical instruments.

== Biography ==
=== 1996–2002: Belle & Sebastian ===
Belle & Sebastian was formed in 1996 by Stuart Murdoch and Stuart David; Campbell had met Murdoch at a New Year's Eve party at age nineteen, and then participated in a recording session with Murdoch and David sponsored by Stow College's Music Business Administration curriculum. They named themselves Belle & Sebastian after a children's book of the same name. Murdoch was the lead singer on the first two albums, with Campbell playing cello, percussion and singing backing vocals. A classically trained cellist, Campbell also played keyboards. She also took lead vocals on a few songs from the band, and co-wrote their top-20 UK single "Legal Man".

Their follow-up was The Boy with the Arab Strap which contained the track "Is It Wicked Not to Care?" where for the first time Campbell sang lead vocals. The band's next album was Fold Your Hands Child, You Walk Like a Peasant. The album introduced many stylistic changes, such as a larger string section and more of the members singing lead vocals; Campbell sings on "Family Tree", and performs a duet with Stevie Jackson on "Beyond the Sunrise".

Most of 2002 was spent on touring and recording a soundtrack album, Storytelling (for Storytelling by Todd Solondz). Campbell left the band in spring of 2002, in the middle of their North American tour.

=== 1998: Collaboration with Snow Patrol ===
On Snow Patrol's 1998 debut album Songs for Polarbears, Campbell provides vocals on the song "NYC".

=== 2003–2006: Solo work ===
In 1999, Campbell released her first solo album, The Green Fields of Foreverland, on the same label as Belle & Sebastian, Jeepster Records, under the name the Gentle Waves. The follow-up to The Green Fields of Foreverland would become Swansong for You released on 6 November 2000. This album would be the last release by Campbell as the Gentle Waves. In 2002, she collaborated with Scottish jazz musician Bill Wells on Ghost of Yesterday, a collection of Billie Holiday songs released by Creeping Bent. In 2003 she released a new album Amorino under her own name. Bill Wells was featured here again, along with other jazz musicians. Her next album, 2006's Ballad of the Broken Seas, was a collaboration with former Screaming Trees vocalist Mark Lanegan and was well received by critics.

Her fourth studio album was released on 23 October 2006 entitled Milkwhite Sheets. It brings traditional songs from United Kingdom and songs written by Campbell. Campbell has stated that album was inspired by the works of Jean Ritchie, Anne Briggs and Shirley Collins.

=== 2007–2013: Collaboration with Mark Lanegan ===
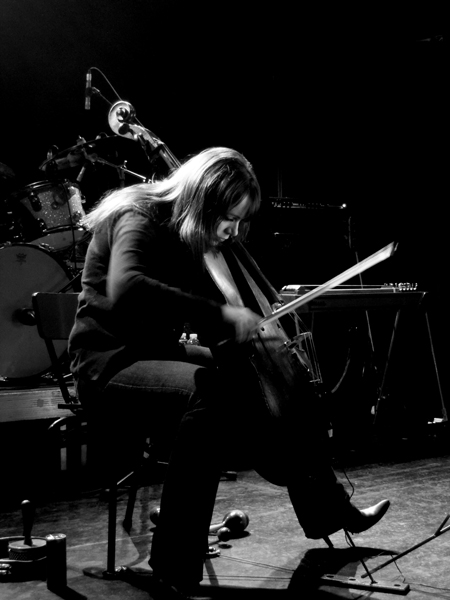
Campbell performing in 2008

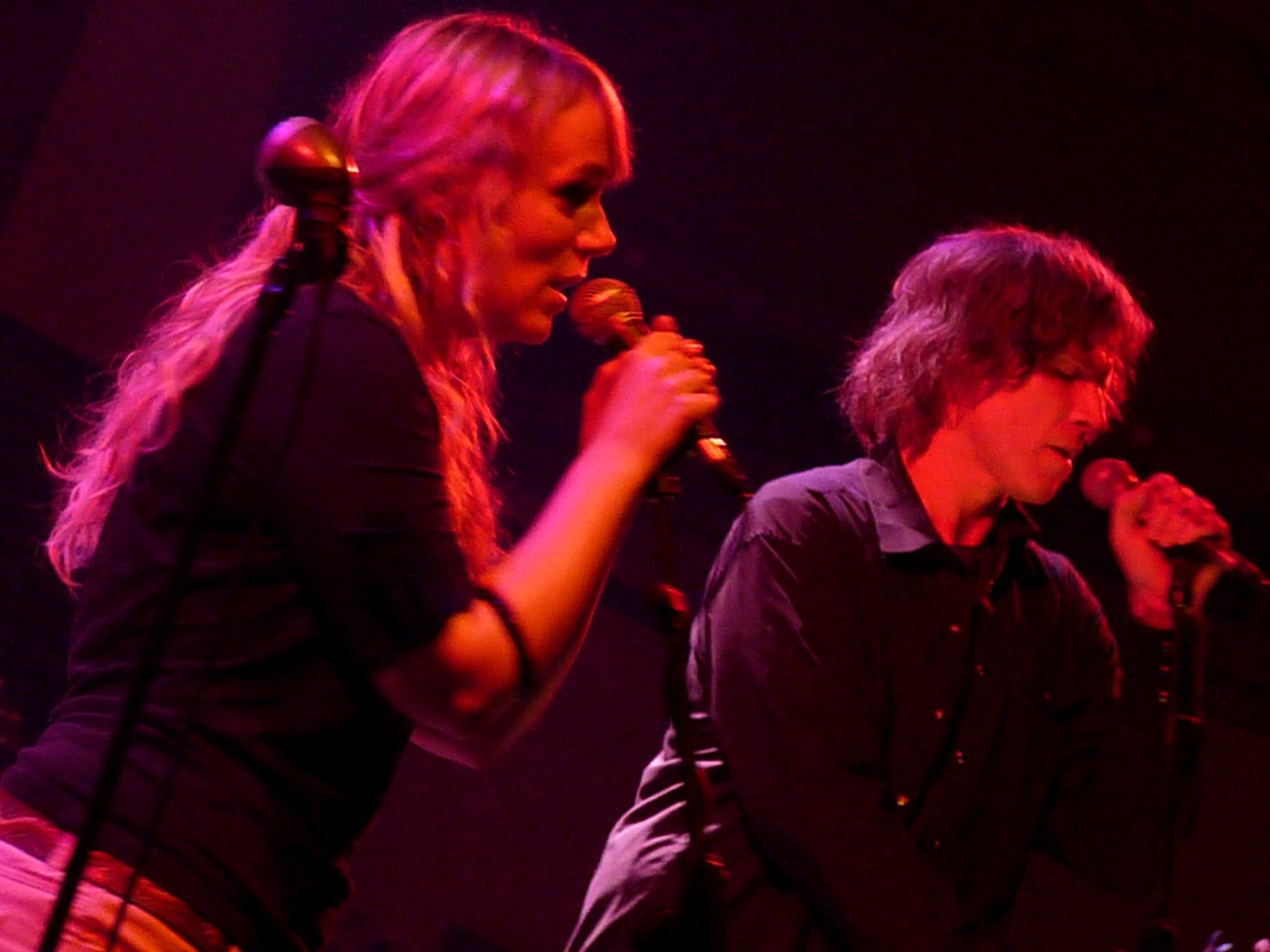
Campbell performing with Mark Lanegan in Barcelona, 2010

In April 2004, Campbell released an EP with former Screaming Trees and Queens of the Stone Age singer Mark Lanegan, titled Time Is Just the Same. They would later release a single entitled "Ramblin' Man" for their collaboration album Ballad of the Broken Seas. Campbell wrote and recorded the majority of the album's tracks in Glasgow, with Lanegan adding vocals in Los Angeles. The album was nominated for the 2006 Mercury Prize. Lanegan and Campbell played four UK concerts in January 2007, with the London date being moved to a larger venue as a result of high demand for tickets.

In 2007, the duo recorded a second album together, entitled Sunday at Devil Dirt, which was released on 5 May 2008. Three singles from the album were released: "Who Built the Road"(7"), "Come On Over (Turn Me On)" (7") and "Keep me in mind sweetheart"(Cd, 12"). The five new tracks of the "Keep me in mind sweetheart" EP were later added as bonus tracks to Sunday at Devil Dirt.

A third collaborative album with Lanegan was released on 16 August 2010 entitled Hawk. The pair toured to promote the album, including a set at All Tomorrow's Parties, 10–12 December 2010 (Bowlie 2) curated by Belle & Sebastian. In July 2013, it was announced that Campbell and Lanegan had officially ended their musical partnership.

=== 2020–Present: Reemergence ===
In February 2020, Campbell released There Is No Other, which was named Rough Trade's album of the week, via new label Cooking Vinyl.

In June 2022, Campbell sang in French on an EP called Son Parapluie with Jérôme Didelot, leader of the band Orwell. This EP included remixes by Jah Wobble (Public Image Ltd) and Martin Carr (The Boo Radleys).

In June 2024, she released her latest album, Bow To Love, complemented by a full version of the album in french, translated as Place À l'Amour.

== Selected discography ==
=== Studio albums ===
- The Green Fields of Foreverland (1999) (as The Gentle Waves)
- Swansong for You (2000) (as The Gentle Waves)
- Amorino (2003)
- Ballad of the Broken Seas (2006) (with Mark Lanegan)
- Milkwhite Sheets (2006)
- Sunday at Devil Dirt (2008) (with Mark Lanegan)
- Hawk (2010) (with Mark Lanegan)
- There Is No Other (2020)
- Bow To Love (2024)
