= Aidan Moffat =

Scottish musician (born 1973)

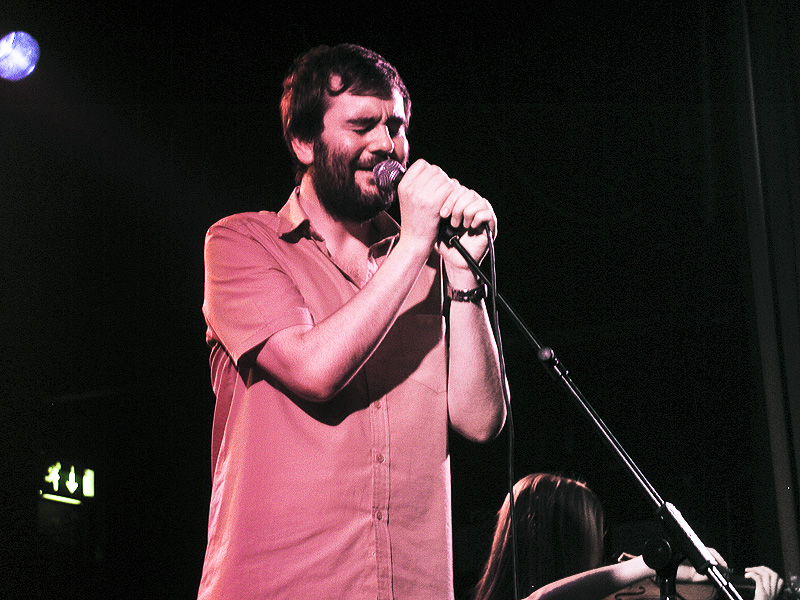
- Moffat performing with Arab Strap in 2004

Background information
- Born: Aidan John Moffat; 10 April 1973 (age 53)
- Origin: Falkirk, Stirlingshire, Scotland
- Occupations: Singer, songwriter
- Years active: 1991–present
- Label: Chemikal Underground
- Member of: Arab Strap
- Website: http://www.aidanmoffat.co.uk

Aidan John Moffat (born 10 April 1973) is a Scottish vocalist and musician, and a member of the band Arab Strap.

== Early life ==
Moffat was born and raised in Falkirk, Scotland. The first album he bought was Elvis Sings for Kids by Elvis Presley. Whilst at Falkirk High School, he listened to such groups as Pixies, Dinosaur Jr. and Slint. His first ever gig was at the age of 16, and saw David Byrne at Glasgow Barrowlands in 1989. In 1990, aged 17, he was expelled from school, with no Higher Qualifications. He then worked for four years at an independent record shop called Sleeves Records, resigning one morning in 1996, due to having a hangover and wanting to go home.

== Career ==
=== Arab Strap ===
In 1995, Moffat and multi-instrumentalist Malcolm Middleton began making music under the name Arab Strap. They sent in demo cassettes to a number of record companies; Chemikal Underground was the only one to reply, and they soon signed to them. They released six albums together, beginning with 1995's The Week Never Starts Round Here, before announcing their break up in 2006.

Moffat and Middleton briefly reunited in November 2011 for a gig as part of the 20th anniversary celebrations of Glasgow venue Nice N Sleazy. They reunited again in 2016, for three shows at London's Electric Brixton, Manchester's O2 Ritz and Glasgow's Barrowlands Ballroom. A second Glasgow show was added after the first one sold out in under half an hour, along with a warm-up show in Newcastle. On 24 November 2020 the band announced they had reunited to record a new album, As Days Get Dark. The album was released on 5 March 2021 and was followed by extensive touring in the UK, Europe and Australia.

=== Outside Arab Strap ===
From 1991 to 1996, Moffat recorded with a band called The Angry Buddhists, which consisted of himself, Gavin Moffat, Stuart the Postman, "Cheg" Taylor and The Stobe. They recorded "over 40 songs on dictaphones and 4-tracks", but never played live. Moffat was also the drummer in Bay, a band who released two albums: Happy Being Different (1994) and Alison Rae (1995).

Aidan Moffat & the Best-Ofs are a four-piece band fronted by Moffat. They played their first gig supporting American band Slint at the Glasgow ABC in Scotland, where they debuted the songs "Big Blonde", "The Last Kiss", "Ballad of the Unsent Letter", "Living With You Now" and "Atheist's Lament". Their first album, titled How to Get to Heaven From Scotland, was released on 3 March 2009.

==== Instrumental albums ====
In 2002, after being challenged by Middleton to record a solo album, Moffat released Hypnogogia under the name Lucky Pierre. In 2005, after changing his stage name to L. Pierre, Moffat released the album called Touchpool, followed by Dip in 2007. In 2013 he released first The Island Come True, then in July another full album, The Eternalist, which was made available for free online and recorded using Vine. Unlike his work with Middleton, the albums are entirely instrumental, making extensive use of field recordings and "found sound."

In 2020 Moffat released Aux pieds de la nuit, a new ambient album, under the name Nyx Nótt. The nom de plume is a combination of Nyx and Nótt, goddesses of the night from Greek and Norse mythology, respectively; Moffat, a lifelong sufferer of insomnia, recorded each record after his family had gone to bed. He released a second album under the name, Themes From, in 2022. Originally conceived as "twenty 90-second tracks designed as TV themes," Moffatt soon expanded the theme, sourcing samples from professional TV and film music libraries.

==== Collaborations ====
Moffat provided guest vocals on the Mogwai song "R U Still in 2 It" from Mogwai Young Team, recorded in the same studio in Hamilton) where the Arab Strap were recording The Week Never Starts Round Here. He also contributed vocals to "Now You're Taken" from 4 Satin, and the band dedicated a song to him, "Waltz for Aidan", on their second album, Come on Die Young. In 2002, Moffat, Stuart Braithwaite from Mogwai and Colin "Sheepy" McPherson released an eponymous EP under the name The Sick Anchors.

In 2011 Moffat and pianist, bassist and former Arab Strap collaborator Bill Wells released Everything's Getting Older, which in June 2012 won the first Scottish Album of the Year (SAY) Award from the Scottish Music Industry Association. A second album, The Most Important Place in the World, followed in 2015.

In May 2018 Moffat released a joint album with longtime friend and collaborator RM Hubbert titled Here Lies the Body. Originally intended as a one-off, within a year they went on to release a Christmas album, Ghost Stories for Christmas, a live album, and a concluding single, "Cut to Black".

In 2022 Moffat and The Twilight Sad frontman James Graham released a collaborative album under the name Gentle Sinners. The album, These Actions Cannot Be Undone, was recorded during the COVID-19 lockdowns in 2021 and reflects the anxiety of those times. It was released digitally and on CD in May and on vinyl in September 2022.

=== Writing ===
Moffat used his own name for his 2007 poetry album, I Can Hear Your Heart. In 2009 He wrote an advice column for the online magazine The Quietus, returning for a one-off Valentine's special to promote his first record as Nyx Nótt. He has also irregularly contributed reviews and commentary to the site, including reflections on a Girls Aloud concert and his thoughts on Star Wars: The Force Awakens.

=== Where You're Meant To Be ===
In 2016 Moffat appeared in the documentary Where You're Meant to Be, in which he toured Scotland performing his reinterpretations of traditional Scottish folk songs. The film, directed by Paul Fegan, also features the traditional singer Sheila Stewart who is critical of the project, viewing it as disrespecting the tradition. She ultimately performs alongside Moffat during a show at the Glasgow Barrowlands.

== Personal life ==
Moffat lives in Glasgow with his partner and two children, a boy and a girl.

He is known for his distinctive facial hair, which he has commented on, saying

I decided as a young man I would never shave again, after a few accidents with a razor. Since then, I've always preferred a bit of hair. I don't know if I'd lose any power and I doubt that I'll ever find that out.

== Albums ==
- Hypnogogia (as Lucky Pierre) Melodic 2002
- Touchpool (as L. Pierre) Melodic 2005
- Dip (as L. Pierre) Melodic 2007
- I Can Hear Your Heart Chemikal 2007
- How To Get To Heaven From Scotland (as Aidan Moffat & the Best-Ofs) 2009
- Everything's Getting Older (with Bill Wells) 2011
- The Island Come True (as L. Pierre) 2013
- The Eternalist (as L. Pierre) 2013
- Vagrants_09_14 2015
- The Most Important Place in the World (with Bill Wells) 2015
- Where You're Meant To Be (live/soundtrack album) 2016
- 1948 — (as L. Pierre) 2017
- Here Lies the Body (with RM Hubbert) 2018
- Ghost Stories for Christmas (with RM Hubbert) 2018
- Aux pieds de la nuit (as Nyx Nótt) 2020
- These Actions Cannot Be Undone (with James Graham, as Gentle Sinners) 2022
