= Malcolm Middleton =

Scottish musician

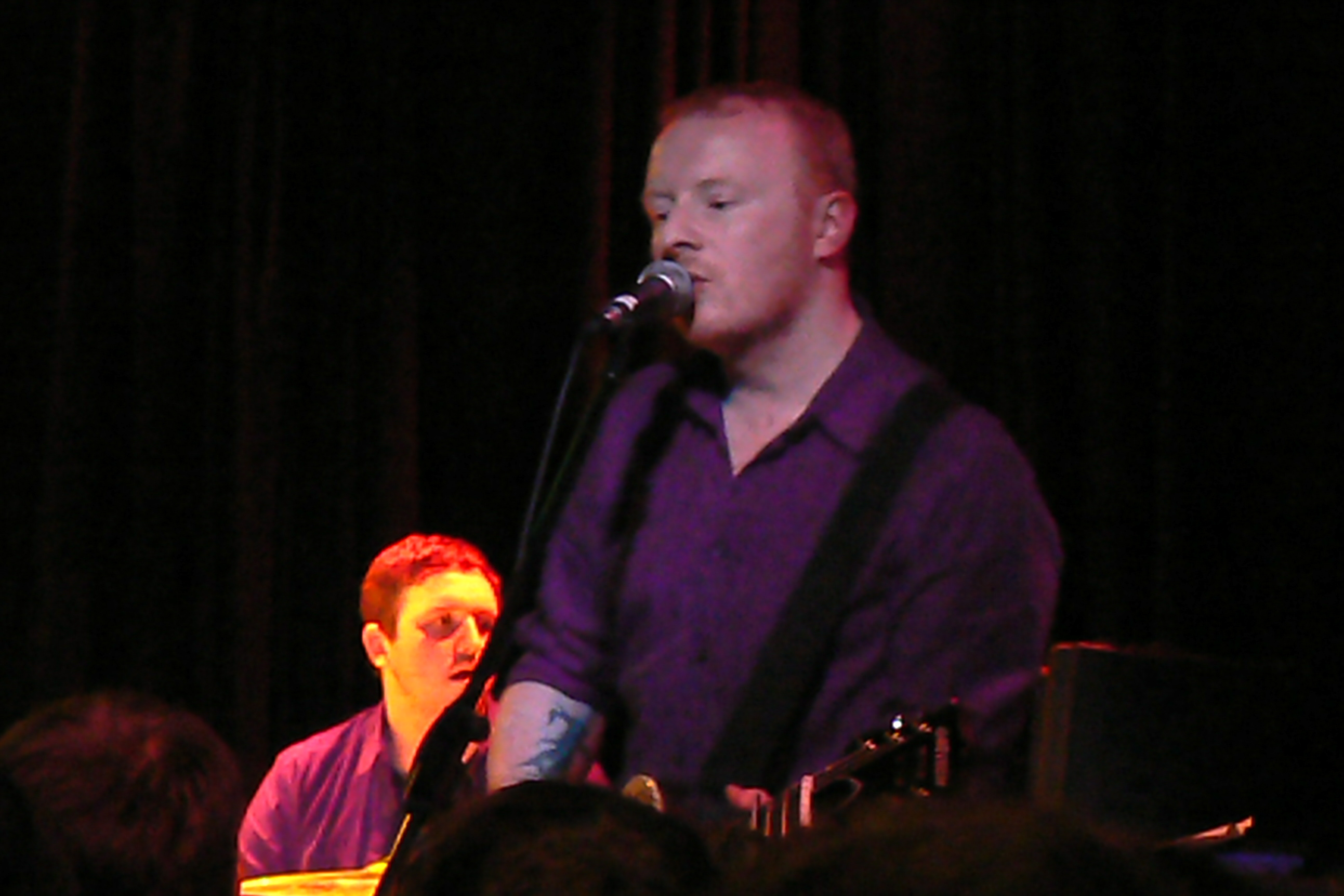
- Middleton performing in 2008

Background information
- Also known as: Human Don't Be Angry
- Born: Malcolm Bruce Middleton; 31 December 1973 (age 52); Dumfries, Scotland
- Origin: Falkirk, Stirlingshire, Scotland
- Genre: Indie rock
- Instruments: Vocals, guitar, bass guitar, piano
- Years active: 1995–present
- Labels: Chemikal Underground; Full Time Hobby
- Member of: Arab Strap

Malcolm Bruce Middleton (born 31 December 1973) is a Scottish musician and member of indie band Arab Strap. He has also released seven solo studio albums and three albums performing under the pseudonym Human Don't Be Angry.

== Early life ==
Middleton was born in Dumfries but raised in Falkirk, Scotland. He attended Graeme High School. He played bass, guitar and sometimes sang in several bands in the 1990s, including Purple Bass Plectrum, Rabid Lettuce, Pigtube and The Laughing Stock.

== Career ==
=== Arab Strap ===
In 1995, Middleton and Aidan Moffat, after bonding over their love of musical artists such as Smog and Will Oldham, began making music under the name "Arab Strap". The band released six studio albums before splitting up in 2006.

After they briefly reunited for a show at Nice n Sleazy in Glasgow in 2011, Middleton has said that he would be open to another Arab Strap gig at some point, but ruled out another record. The band did indeed reunite for a string of dates in 2016, marking their 20th anniversary, continuing the tour into 2017. In 2021 the band released their first new album in over 15 years, As Days Get Dark, also marking their return to performing live.

=== Solo career ===
Middleton released his first solo album 5:14 Fluoxytine Seagull Alcohol John Nicotine in 2002, followed by Into the Woods in 2005.

After Arab Strap split in 2006, the album A Brighter Beat was released in 2007. The first song on the album "We're All Going To Die" was released as a single on 17 December and started off with odds of 1,000–1 against becoming the Christmas number one – reportedly the highest odds ever quoted. After support from social networking websites and from BBC Radio 1 DJ Colin Murray, the odds dropped to 9–1, and Middleton was 4th favourite for Christmas Number One behind Leona Lewis, Katie Melua ft Eva Cassidy and The X Factor winner Leon Jackson. Murray started supporting the song as a response to repeated Christmas chart domination by manufactured pop acts churned out by the likes of The X Factor. Middleton has said that, despite the song's negative-sounding title, he feels the song perfectly sums up the spirit of Christmas – the need to make the most of life while we have it. On the UK singles chart dated 23 December 2007 the song reached number 31, with the Christmas Number One being a cover of Mariah Carey and Whitney Houston's When You Believe performed by Leon Jackson. The publicity around the single gave Middleton significant mainstream exposure for the first time in his career.

Middleton's next solo album Sleight of Heart was released in 2008.

Middleton's fifth solo album, entitled Waxing Gibbous, was released on 8 June 2009. The single "Red Travellin' Socks", released on 18 May 2009, preceded the album's release.

Whilst promoting Waxing Gibbous, Middleton noted that he would be refraining from performing and recording under his own name in the future, stating "I'm starting to feel like I've done as much as I can with this creative voice." This was followed by the first album released under the Human Don't Be Angry moniker.

Despite previously saying that he would no longer perform or record under his own name, in 2013 Middleton embarked on a new solo tour in support of a vinyl reissue of 5:14 Fluoxytine Seagull Alcohol John Nicotine by Chemikal Underground. In 2014 he released Music and Words, a collaboration with the artist David Shrigley.

In April 2015, Middleton announced new Human Don't Be Angry material, the album Electric Blue, which was released in June 2015.

Middleton released a new album under his own name, Summer of '13, in May 2016, followed by Bananas in 2018. In 2020, Middleton released the latest Human Don't Be Angry album, Guitar Variations.

== Discography ==
=== Studio albums ===
- 5:14 Fluoxytine Seagull Alcohol John Nicotine (2002)
- Into The Woods (2005)
- A Brighter Beat (2007)
- Sleight of Heart (2008)
- Waxing Gibbous (2009)
- Human Don't Be Angry (2012) (as Human Don't Be Angry)
- Music and Words (2014) (with artist David Shrigley)
- Electric Blue (2015) (as Human Don't Be Angry)
- Summer Of '13 (2016)
- Bananas (2018)
- Guitar Variations (2020) (as Human Don't Be Angry)

=== EPs and other releases ===
- Girl Band Pop Songs (2009)
- A Quarter Past Shite 18 previously unreleased songs (2011)

=== Live albums ===
- Live at the Bush Hall (2007)
- Long, Dark Night / Live In Zurich (2010)
- Live In Leeds - Human Don't Be Angry (2011)

=== Singles ===
Year	Song	Album	Record label
2004	"Ryanair Song"	Non-album single	Nowhere Fast
2005	"Loneliness Shines"/"No Modest Bear"	Into The Woods	Chemikal Underground
2005	"Break My Heart"	Into The Woods	Chemikal Underground
2007	"A Brighter Beat"	A Brighter Beat	Full Time Hobby
2007	"Fuck It, I Love You"	A Brighter Beat	Full Time Hobby
2007	"Fight Like the Night"	A Brighter Beat	Full Time Hobby
2007	"We're All Going to Die"	A Brighter Beat	Full Time Hobby
2008	"Blue Plastic Bags"	Sleight of Heart	Full Time Hobby
2009	"Red Travellin' Socks"	Waxing Gibbous	Full Time Hobby
2009	"Zero"	Waxing Gibbous	Full Time Hobby
2016	"Steps"	Summer of '13	Nude
2016	"You and I"	Summer of '13	Nude
2016	"Little Hurricane"	Summer of '13	Nude
2019	"Scaffolding/Have Fun Mister"	Non-album single	Triassic Tusk Records
