= Mogwai discography =

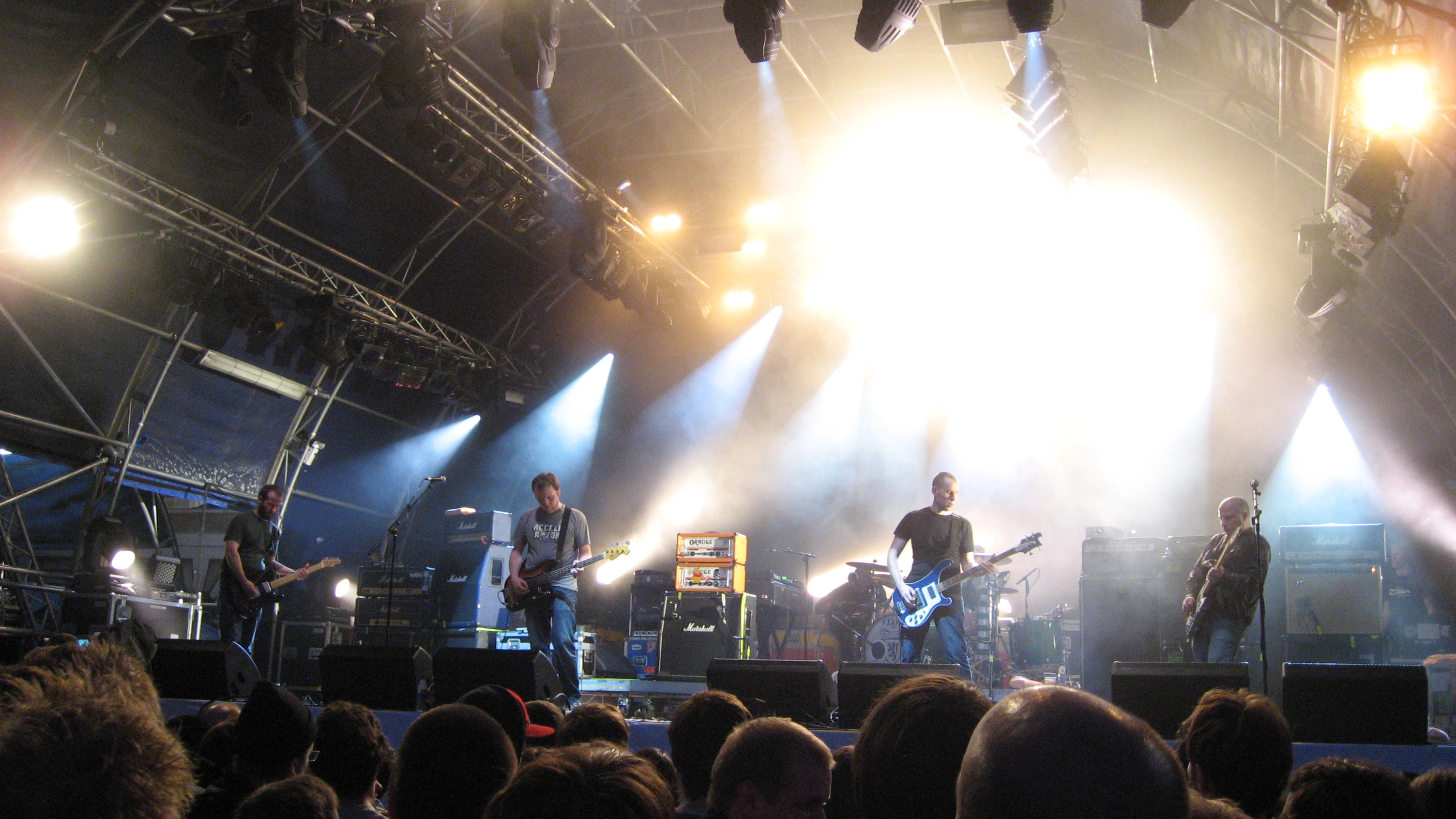
- Mogwai performing at Somerset House in London, 2007
- Studio albums: 11
- Extended plays: 14
- Live albums: 3
- Compilation albums: 4
- Singles: 16
- Remix albums: 2
- Film and television scores: 9

This is a discography of Mogwai, a Scottish post-rock band.

== Albums ==
=== Studio albums ===
Title	Album details	Peak chart positions										Certifications
Title	Album details	UK	GER	FRA	NLD	BEL (FL)	BEL (WA)	AUT	ITA	US	SCO	Certifications
Mogwai Young Team	Release date: 21 October 1997; Format: CD, LP; Label: Chemikal Underground	62	65	—	—	169	—	—	—	—	3	BPI: Silver
Come On Die Young	Release date: 29 March 1999; Format: CD, LP; Label: Chemikal Underground	29	—	—	—	—	—	—	—	—	24	
Rock Action	Release date: 30 April 2001; Format: CD, LP; Label: Play It Again Sam	23	—	82	—	—	—	—	—	—	20	
Happy Songs for Happy People	Release date: 21 May 2003; Format: CD, LP; Label: Play It Again Sam	47	—	91	—	—	—	—	—	182	22	
Mr Beast	Release date: 6 March 2006; Format: CD, LP; Label: Play It Again Sam	31	65	64	97	21	57	—	—	128	17	
The Hawk Is Howling	Release date: 22 September 2008; Format: CD, LP; Label: Wall of Sound	35	72	53	92	29	70	—	47	97	18	
Hardcore Will Never Die, but You Will	Release date: 14 February 2011; Format: CD, LP; Label: Rock Action	25	27	46	83	31	39	49	—	97	12	
Rave Tapes	Release date: 20 January 2014; Format: CD, LP, Cassette; Label: Rock Action	10	16	37	78	12	30	56	50	55	2	
Every Country's Sun	Release date: 1 September 2017; Format: CD, LP; Label: Rock Action	6	29	50	85	21	19	52	—	—	2	
As the Love Continues	Release date: 19 February 2021; Format: CD, LP; Label: Rock Action	1	3	59	—	5	17	29	78	—	1	
The Bad Fire	Release date: 24 January 2025; Format: CD, LP, cassette; Label: Rock Action	5	16	—	—	22	32	47	—	—	1	
"—" denotes a recording that did not chart or was not released in that territory.

=== Live albums ===
Title	Album details	Peak chart positions
Title	Album details	AUS
Special Moves	Release date: 23 August 2010; Format: CD, LP; Label: Rock Action (US & UK)	—
Mogwai – iTunes Festival London 2011	Release date: 26 August 2011; Format: Download; Label: Rock Action	—
2018	Release date: 4 September 2020; Format: Download; Label: Rock Action	80
"—" denotes a recording that did not chart or was not released in that territory.

=== Compilation albums ===
Year	Title	Label	Notes
1997	Ten Rapid (Collected Recordings 1996–1997): Release date: 17 April 1997; Format: CD	Rock Action (UK); Jetset (US); Voices of Wonder (Scandinavia); Spunk (Australia/New Zealand); Trama (Brazil)	Compiles songs previously released throughout 1996—1997 from various sources.
2000	EP+6: Release date: 23 August 2000; Format: CD	Toy's Factory (Japan); Chemikal Underground (UK)	Initially Japan-only album, compiling the EPs 4 Satin, No Education = No Future (Fuck the Curfew), and EP on one CD, later released in the UK.
2005	Government Commissions: BBC Sessions 1996–2003: Release date: 21 February 2005; Format: CD, LP	Play It Again Sam (Europe); Matador (US); Toy's Factory (Japan); Soyuz (Russia)	Compiles songs recorded from various BBC Radio sessions with John Peel and Steve Lamacq.
2015	Central Belters: Release date: 9 October 2015; Format: 3xCD, 6xLP	Rock Action Records	20th anniversary career retrospective and rarities.

== EPs ==
Year	Title	Label	Notes
1997	4 Satin: Release date: 26 May 1997; Format: CD, 12"	Chemikal Underground (UK); Jet Set (US)	UK Singles Chart #94
1998	Mogwai Fear Satan Remixes: Release date: 30 March 1998; Format: CD, 12"	Eye Q (UK)	Features remixes of "Mogwai Fear Satan" by Mogwai, μ-Ziq, Surgeon and My Bloody Valentine. UK Singles Chart #57
1998	No Education = No Future (Fuck the Curfew): Release date: 29 June 1998; Format: CD, 12"	Chemikal Underground (UK)	UK Singles Chart #68
1999	EP: Release date: 18 October 1999; Format: CD, 12"	Chemikal Underground (UK); Matador (US); Spunk (Australia/New Zealand)	
2000	EP+6: Release date: 23 August 2000; Format: Enhanced CD	Toy's Factory (Japan); Chemikal Underground (UK), in 2001	
2001	Travels in Constants, Vol. 12: Release date: 18 March 2001; Format: CD	Temporary Residence Limited (US)	Mogwai's contribution to the subscription-only series of twelve EPs from Temporary Residence Limited.
2001	US Tour EP: Release date: 24 May 2001; Format: 10"	Matador (US)	Split 10" EP with Bardo Pond, sold during Mogwai's May–June 2001 tour of the US.
2001	UK/European Tour EP: Release date: 2 November 2001; Format: CD		Compiles limited edition tracks from various 2001 releases.
2006	Travel Is Dangerous: Release date: 26 June 2006; Format: CD, 12"	Play It Again Sam (Europe)	
2008	Batcat: Release date: 8 September 2008; Format: CD, 12", Download	Wall of Sound (Europe); Matador (US); Spunk (Australia/New Zealand)	UK Singles Chart #164
2011	Earth Division: Release date: 12 September 2011; Format: CD, 12", Download	Rock Action Records (UK, Europe); Sub Pop (US)	UK Singles Chart #178
2012-2013	Les Revenants EP: Release date: 17 December 2012 (digital); 28 January 2013 (physical); Format: CD, 10", Download	Rock Action Records (UK, Europe)	
2014	Music Industry 3. Fitness Industry 1.: Release date: 1 December 2014; Format: CD, 12", Download	Rock Action Records	
2021	Take Sides: Release date: 1 October, 2021; Format: Download	Rock Action Records	Remix EP featuring Alessandro Cortini, The Other Two, and Idles

== Singles ==
Year	Title	Album	Label	Notes
1996	"Tuner"/"Lower": Release date: 18 March 1996; Format: 7"	non-album singles	Rock Action (UK)	Double A-side, limited to 500± copies. "Tuner" was rerecorded for Ten Rapid.
1996	"Angels vs Aliens": Release date: 1 July 1996; Format: 7"	non-album singles	Ché Trading (UK)	Split with English band [dweeb]. "Angels vs Aliens" was rerecorded for Ten Rapid.
1996	"Summer"/"Ithica 27 Φ 9": Release date: 4 November 1996; Format: 7"	non-album singles	Love Train (UK)	Double A-side, limited to 1500 copies. Both tracks feature on Ten Rapid.
1997	"New Paths to Helicon, Pt. 1" / "New Paths to Helicon, Pt. 2": Release date: February 1997; Format: 7"	non-album singles	Wurlitzer Jukebox (UK)	Double A-side, limited to 3000 copies. Both tracks feature on Ten Rapid.
1997	Club Beatroot - Part Four: Release date: May 1997; Format: 7"	non-album singles	Flotsam & Jetsam (UK)	Split with Scottish band pH Family, limited to 500 copies. Features "Stereo Dee (Live)", recorded at The 13th Note, Glasgow, Scotland on 13 February 1997.
1998	Do the Rock Boogaloo: Release date: 23 March 1998; Format: 7", CD	non-album singles	Fierce Panda (UK)	UK Singles Chart #60; Split with English band Magoo. Features a cover of "Sweet Leaf" by Black Sabbath.
2001	"My Father My King": Release date: 22 October 2001; Format: 12", CD	non-album singles	Rock Action (UK); Matador (US); Spunk (Australia/New Zealand)	
2006	"Friend of the Night": Release date: 30 January 2006; Format: 7", CD	Mr Beast	Play It Again Sam (Europe)	UK Singles Chart #38; First single released from a studio album
2011	"Rano Pano" / "Hasenheide": Release date: 18 January 2011; Format: 7"	Hardcore Will Never Die, But You Will	Sub Pop	
2011	"Mexican Grand Prix" / "Slight Domestic": Release date: 7 February 2011; Format: 7"	Hardcore Will Never Die, But You Will	Rock Action	
2011	"San Pedro" / "George Square Thatcher; Death Party (Session Version)": Release date: 23 May 2011; Format: 7"	Hardcore Will Never Die, But You Will	Rock Action	
2017	"Coolverine" / "Party in the Dark": Release date: 2 August 2017; Format: 7"	Every Country's Sun	Rock Action	
2017	"Party in the Dark" / "Eternal Panther": Release date: 25 August 2017; Format: 7"	Every Country's Sun	Rock Action	
2020	"Dry Fantasy": Release date: 29 October 2020; Format: Download	As the Love Continues	Rock Action	
2021	"Ritchie Sacramento": Release date: 12 January 2021; Format: Download	As the Love Continues	Rock Action	
2022	"Boltfor": Release date: 26 April 2022; Format: Download	non-album single	Rock Action	
2024	"God Gets You Back": Release date: 17 September 2024; Format: Download	The Bad Fire	Rock Action	

== Remix albums ==
Year	Title	Label
1998	Kicking a Dead Pig: Mogwai Songs Remixed: Release date: 18 May 1998; Format: CD, LP	Eye Q, Chemikal Underground (UK); Jetset (US)
2012	A Wrenched Virile Lore: Release date: 19 November 2012, except USA 4 December; Format: CD, LP, Download	Rock Action (UK/world); Sub Pop (US)

== Film and television scores ==
Year	Title	Film/TV series	Label
2006	Zidane: A 21st Century Portrait: Release date: 30 October 2006; Format: CD, LP	Zidane: A 21st Century Portrait	Play It Again Sam (Europe)
2006	The Fountain: Music from the Motion Picture: Release date: 21 November 2006; Collaboration with Clint Mansell and Kronos Quartet; Format: CD	The Fountain	Nonesuch Records
2013	Les Revenants OST: Release date: 25 February 2013; Format: CD, LP, Download	The Returned (TV series)	Rock Action Records
2016	Atomic: A Soundtrack by Mogwai: Release date: 1 April 2016; Format: CD, LP, Download	Atomic, Living in Dread and Promise (TV documentary)	Rock Action Records
2016	Before the Flood (Music from the Motion Picture): Release date: 21 October 2016; Collaboration with Trent Reznor, Atticus Ross and Gustavo Santaolalla.; Format: 3xLP, Download	Before the Flood (feature-length documentary)	Lakeshore Records
2018	Kin (soundtrack): Release date: 31 August 2018; Format: CD, LP, Download	Kin	Rock Action Records
2020	ZeroZeroZero (soundtrack): Release date: 1 May 2020; Format: Download; Vinyl released for Record Store Day 2021 (June 12 UK, June 18 North America); CD released 26 November 2021	ZeroZeroZero	Rock Action Records
2022	Black Bird (soundtrack): Release date: 8 July 2022; Format: Download	Black Bird (Apple TV+ Series)	Rock Action Records
2023	Wanted: The Escape of Carlos Ghosn: Release Date: Unreleased; Format: N/A	Wanted: The Escape of Carlos Ghosn (Apple TV+ series)	
2025	The Bombing of Pan Am 103: Release Date: 18 May 2025; Format: Download	The Bombing of Pan Am 103 (BBC miniseries)	

== Various Artists Compilation appearances ==
Year	Title	Mogwai Tracks	Label
1996	NME C96: Release date: 1996; Format: CD	7. "a-70"	NME
1997	Bedroom Ambience: A Collection of Home Recordings: Release date: 1997; Format: LP	9. "Stereo Donut"	Enraptured
1998	NME Clean Sweep: Live at the London Astoria 98: Release date: March 1998; Format: CD	7. "Ex-Cowboy (Live)"	NME
1998	A Tribute to Spacemen 3: Release date: 4 May 1998; Format: CD	3. "Honey" (cover)	Rocket Girl
1998	NME Presents: Radio 1 Sound City: Release date: 25 October 1998; Format: CD	12. "I Don't Know What to Say"	NME
1998	Glasgow EP: Release date: November 1998; Format: 7"	1. "I Can't Remember"	Plastic Cowboy Recordings
1999	Fabulous Shit: Release date: 2 November 1999; Format: CD	6. "003"	Lo Recordings
1999	The Carve-Up: Release date: 1999; Format: CD	7. "Nick Drake"	Loose
2003	Rock Action Presents Vol 1: Release date: 6 September 2003; Format: CD	5. "Tuner (Original 7" Version)"; 9. "Star Wars"	Rock Action
2004	Matador at Fifteen: Release date: 12 October 2004; Format: CD	Disc 1, 18. "Hunted by a Freak"; Disc 2, 6. "Hunted by a Freak (Boom Bip Remix)"	Matador
2007	The 11th Hour (soundtrack): Release date: 13 November 2007; Format: CD	10. "Mogwai Fear Satan"	Lakeshore Records
2008	A Rock Action Sampler: Spring 2008: Release date: 2008; Format: CD	6. "Dracula Family"	Rock Action
2010	Matador at 21: Release date: 28 September 2010; Format: CD	Disc 3, 10. "Helps Both Ways"; Disc 4, 7. "Kids Will Be Skeletons"; Disc 6, 15. "Ex-Cowboy (Live)"	Matador
2012	Occupy This Album: Release date: 15 May 2012; Format: CD	Disc 4, 17. "Earth Division"	Music for Occupy
2012	Live At KEXP - Volume Eight: Release date: 2012; Format: CD	8. "Hasenheide (Live Session)"	KEXP
2013	Dig for Fire: A Tribute to Pixies: Release date: 14 November 2013; Format: CD, Download	7. "Gouge Away" (cover)	American Laundromat Records
2014	Other Voices: Series 12 (Live): Release date: 30 May 2014; Format: Download	20. "MasterCard (Live Version)"; 21. "Remurdered (Live Version)"	Other Voices
2016	Life Is Strange (soundtrack): Release date: 19 January 2016; Format: CD, Download	8. "Kids Will Be Skeletons"	DONTNOD Entertainment
2019	Rocket Girl 20: Release date: 1 March 2019; Format: CD + 7" vinyl + flexi disc	Flexi disc: "Fight for Work"	Rocket Girl

== Documentary ==
Year	Title	Format
2025	If the Stars Had a Sound	Documentary feature film on DVD/Blu-ray (Blu-ray includes 12 exclusive art cards and a live performance at Tramway from 2021)

== Music Videos ==
- "Summer" (1997)
- "Christmas Steps" (1999)
- "Stanley Kubrick" (1999)
- "Hunted by a Freak" (2003)
- "Friend of the Night" (2006)
- "Travel Is Dangerous" (2007)
- "Batcat" (2008)
- "How to Be a Warewolf" (2010)
- "Mexican Grand Prix" (2011)
- "San Pedro" (2011)
- "Rano Pano" (2011)
- "The Lord Is Out of Control" (2013)
- "Teenage Exorcists" (2014)
- "Simon Ferocious" (2014)
- "Helicon 1" (2015)
- "Ether" (2016)
- "Colverine" (2017)
- "Party in the Dark" (2017)
- "Crossing the Road Material" (2017)
- "Dry Fantasy" (2020)
- "Ritchie Sacramento" (2021)
- "Ceiling Granny" (2021)
- "Boltfor" (2022)
- "God Gets You Back" (2024)
- "Lion Rumpus" (2025)
- "Fanzine Made Of Flesh" (2025)
- "Tuner" (2026)
