= Central Belters =

Compilation album by Mogwai
- Released: 23 October 2015
- Recorded: 1995–2014
- Length: 3:39:39 (total)
- Label: Rock Action
- Producer: Mogwai; Paul Savage; Andy Miller; Jamie Harley; Michael Brennan Jr.; Dave Fridmann; Tony Doogan; Geoff Allan

Mogwai chronology
Rave Tapes (2014)	Central Belters (2015)	Atomic (2016)

Central Belters is a compilation album by Scottish post-rock band Mogwai, released on 23 October 2015 by Rock Action Records. It is a career retrospective of the band's work to mark their 20th anniversary, and contains highlights from the band's career, non-album singles, and some rarities. The title refers to the Central Belt of Scotland, from where the group originated. The album reached number 40 on the UK Albums Chart and was met with critical acclaim.

== Critical reception ==
Professional ratings
Aggregate scores
Source	Rating
Metacritic	85/100
Review scores
Source	Rating
The 405	9/10
AllMusic	4/5 stars
The Line of Best Fit	7.5/10
Pitchfork	8/10
PopMatters	8/10 stars
The Quietus	(favourable)

Central Belters was met with widespread critical acclaim. At Metacritic, which assigns a normalised rating out of 100 to reviews from mainstream critics, the album received an average score of 85, based on 11 reviews, indicating "universal acclaim".

== Track listing ==
CD1 (LP1 & LP2)
No.	Title	Length
1.	"Summer" (from the 1996 single)	4:27
2.	"Helicon 1" (from the 1997 single)	5:57
3.	"CODY" (from the 1999 album Come On Die Young)	6:35
4.	"Christmas Steps" (from the 1999 album Come On Die Young)	10:39
5.	"I Know You Are But What Am I?" (from the 2003 album Happy Songs for Happy People)	5:18
6.	"Hunted By a Freak" (from the 2003 album Happy Songs for Happy People)	4:17
7.	"Stanley Kubrick" (from the 1999 EP EP)	4:15
8.	"Take Me Somewhere Nice" (from the 2001 album Rock Action)	6:59
9.	"2 Rights Make 1 Wrong" (from the 2001 album Rock Action)	9:33
10.	"Mogwai Fear Satan" (from the 1997 album Mogwai Young Team)	16:21

CD2 (LP3 & LP4)
No.	Title	Length
1.	"Auto Rock" (from the 2006 album Mr Beast)	4:19
2.	"Travel is Dangerous" (from the 2006 album Mr Beast)	4:01
3.	"Friend of the Night" (from the 2006 album Mr Beast)	5:30
4.	"We're No Here" (from the 2006 album Mr Beast)	5:37
5.	"I'm Jim Morrison, I'm Dead" (from the 2008 album The Hawk Is Howling)	6:44
6.	"The Sun Smells Too Loud" (from the 2008 album The Hawk Is Howling)	6:59
7.	"Batcat" (from the 2008 album The Hawk Is Howling)	5:23
8.	"Mexican Grand Prix" (from the 2011 album Hardcore Will Never Die, But You Will)	5:19
9.	"Rano Pano" (from the 2011 album Hardcore Will Never Die, But You Will)	5:15
10.	"How To Be a Werewolf" (from the 2011 album Hardcore Will Never Die, But You Will)	6:22
11.	"Wizard Motor" (from the 2013 soundtrack Les Revenants)	4:41
12.	"Remurdered" (from the 2014 album Rave Tapes)	6:26
13.	"The Lord is Out of Control" (from the 2014 album Rave Tapes)	4:23
14.	"Teenage Exorcists" (from the 2014 EP Music Industry 3. Fitness Industry 1.)	3:32

CD3 (LP5 & LP6)
No.	Title	Length
1.	"Hugh Dallas" (from the Come On Die Young sessions, included on 2014 reissue)	8:33
2.	"Half Time" (from the 2006 soundtrack Zidane: A 21st Century Portrait)	6:51
3.	"Burn Girl Prom Queen" (from the 1999 EP EP)	8:31
4.	"Devil Rides (feat. Roky Erickson)" (from the 2008 EP Batcat)	4:01
5.	"Hasenheide" (from the 2011 single "Rano Pano")	3:29
6.	"Tell Everybody That I Love Them" (from the box set version of 2014 album Rave Tapes)	4:41
7.	"Earth Division" (from the 2012 compilation Occupy This Album)	6:02
8.	"Hungry Face" (from the 2013 soundtrack Les Revenants)	2:23
9.	"D to E" (from the 2001 US Tour EP)	6:01
10.	"My Father My King" (from the 2001 single)	20:14

== Charts ==
Chart (2015)	Peak position
Belgian Albums (Ultratop Flanders)	57
Belgian Albums (Ultratop Wallonia)	59
French Albums (SNEP)	126
UK Albums (OCC)	40
