= Zidane =

Zidane may refer to:

- Zidane (name), a given name and surname
  - Most notably, Zinedine Zidane, French footballer
- Zidane: A 21st Century Portrait, documentary about the French footballer
  - Zidane: A 21st Century Portrait (soundtrack)
- Zidane Tribal, the protagonist of the video game Final Fantasy IX
