= Les Revenants =

Les Revenants may refer to:

- They Came Back or Les Revenants, a 2004 French zombie film
- Les Revenants (TV series), a 2012 French supernatural drama television series adapted from the film
  - Les Revenants (album), a soundtrack album for the series by Scottish post-rock band Mogwai
  - Les Revenants EP, an EP of soundtrack songs from the series by Mogwai
- Les Revenents, a 1972 récit or novella by French modernist writer Georges Perec notable for its monovocalisme, that is, its univocalic use of only the vowel 'e' as a literary constraint.

== See also ==
- Revenant (disambiguation)
