= Castle of Doom =

Castle of Doom may refer to:

- Vampyr, a 1932 French-German horror film directed by Carl Theodor Dreyer
- Castle of Doom Studios, a recording studio in Glasgow, Scotland
