= Miami Vice (film) =

2006 film by Michael Mann

- Theatrical release poster
- Directed by: Michael Mann
- Written by: Michael Mann
- Based on: Miami Vice by Anthony Yerkovich
- Produced by: Michael Mann; Pieter Jan Brugge
- Starring: Jamie Foxx; Colin Farrell; Gong Li; Naomie Harris; Ciarán Hinds; Justin Theroux; Barry Shabaka Henley
- Cinematography: Dion Beebe
- Edited by: William Goldenberg; Paul Rubell
- Music by: John Murphy
- Production companies: Universal Pictures; Motion Picture ETA Produktionsgesellschaft mbH & Co. KG; Forward Pass; Metropolis Films
- Distributed by: Universal Pictures
- Release dates: July 20, 2006 (Westwood); July 28, 2006 (United States); August 24, 2006 (Germany)
- Running time: 134 minutes
- Countries: United States; Germany
- Language: English
- Budget: $135–150 million
- Box office: $164.2 million

Miami Vice is a 2006 crime action film produced, written, and directed by Michael Mann. It is an adaptation of the 1980s television series of the same name, which Mann produced. It stars Colin Farrell as James "Sonny" Crockett and Jamie Foxx as Ricardo "Rico" Tubbs, MDSO detectives who go undercover to fight drug trafficking operations. The cast also features Gong Li, Naomie Harris, Justin Theroux, Ciarán Hinds, and Barry Shabaka Henley.

Foxx brought up the idea of a Miami Vice film to Mann during a party for Ali. This led Mann to revisit the series. Like Collateral, which also starred Foxx, most of the film was shot with the Thomson Viper Filmstream Camera, while Super 35 was used for high-speed and underwater shots.

Miami Vice premiered in Los Angeles on July 20, 2006, and was later released in North America 8 days later by Universal Pictures. The film was a box-office flop, as it grossed $164.2 million worldwide on a reported $135–150 million budget, and received polarized reviews, with praise for Mann's directing and visual style but criticism for the serious storyline. In subsequent years, its reputation among critics and filmmakers has grown, with critic Steven Hyden writing in 2016 that the film had become a cult favorite.

== Plot ==
While working an undercover prostitute sting operation in a nightclub to arrest a pimp named Neptune, Miami-Dade Police detectives James "Sonny" Crockett and Ricardo "Rico" Tubbs receive a frantic phone call from their former informant Alonzo Stevens. He reveals that he is leaving town, and, believing his wife Leonetta to be in immediate danger, asks Rico to check on her. Crockett learns that Stevens was working as an informant for the FBI but has been compromised.

Crockett and Tubbs quickly contact the FBI Special Agent in Charge John Fujima and warn him about Stevens' safety. Tracking down Stevens through a vehicle transponder and aerial surveillance, Crockett and Tubbs stop him along I-95. Stevens reveals that a Colombian cartel had become aware that Russian FSB operatives (now dead) were working undercover with the FBI, and had threatened to murder Leonetta via a C-4 necklace bomb if he did not confess. Rico, learning of Leonetta's death by telephone call, tells Alonzo that he does not have to go home. Hearing this, the grief-stricken Stevens commits suicide by walking in front of an oncoming semi-truck.

En route to the murder scene, Sonny and Rico receive a call from Lt. Martin Castillo and are instructed to meet him downtown, where they are introduced to Fujima, head of the Florida Joint Inter-Agency Task Force between the FBI, the DEA, and U.S. Customs and Border Patrol. Crockett and Tubbs berate Fujima for the errors committed and ask why the MDPD was not involved. Fujima reveals that the Colombian group, a wing of the A.U.C., is highly sophisticated and run by José Yero, initially thought to be the cartel's leader. Fujima enlists Crockett and Tubbs, making them Organized Crime Drug Enforcement Task Force deputies, to lead a deep undercover operation. They continue the investigation by looking into go-fast boats coming from the Caribbean, delivering loads of narcotics from the Colombians. They then coerce their Miami informant Nicholas into setting up a meet-and-greet with the cartel.

Posing as highly skilled drug smugglers, Sonny and Rico offer their services to Yero, the cartel's security and intelligence man. After a tense meeting, they pass screening and are introduced to Arcángel de Jesús Montoya, transnational drug trafficking kingpin. During their investigation, Crockett and Tubbs learn that the cartel is using the Aryan Brotherhood to distribute drugs and have supplied them with state-of-the-art weaponry, which they used to kill the Russian undercovers. Meanwhile, Crockett tries to gather further evidence from Montoya's financial adviser and lover, Isabella, but ends up starting a secret romance with her while on a trip by speedboat to Cuba. At a club, Yero observes the two dancing closely. Afterward, Crockett and Isabella discuss the possibility of running away together. Tubbs begins to fear for the team's safety due to Crockett's fling. Those fears are realized when Trudy, the unit's intelligence agent and Rico's girlfriend, is kidnapped by the Aryan Brotherhood on Yero's order, who never trusted Crockett and Tubbs. The Aryan Brotherhood demand that Crockett and Tubbs deliver the cartel's load directly to them. With Lt. Castillo's help and clues given by Trudy, the unit triangulates Trudy's location to a mobile home in a trailer park near an airport. The team rescue Trudy, but she is critically injured when Yero remotely detonates a bomb that destroys the home. Soon afterward, Yero reveals Isabella's betrayal to Montoya and captures her.

Crockett, Tubbs, and their team face off against Yero, his men, and the Aryan Brotherhood in a shipyard at the port of Miami. During the firefight, Crockett calls in backup. When Isabella sees his police shield and radio, she realizes that he is a cop. Betrayed, Isabella wrestles with Crockett until he subdues her. Tubbs guns down Yero as he attempts to shoot his way to safety. After the gunfight, Crockett takes Isabella to a police safehouse and insists she will have to leave without him. Isabella tells him "time is luck", holding out hope their affair can continue, but he tells her that "luck ran out". Crockett arranges for Isabella to leave the country and return home to Cuba, thus avoiding arrest. Tubbs keeps watch on Trudy in the hospital as she begins to awaken from her coma.

== Cast ==
- Colin Farrell as Det. James "Sonny" Crockett
- Jamie Foxx as Det. Ricardo "Rico" Tubbs
- Gong Li as Isabella
- Naomie Harris as Det. Trudy Joplin
- Ciarán Hinds as FBI Agent John Fujima
- Elizabeth Rodriguez as Det. Gina Calabrese
- Domenick Lombardozzi as Det. Stan Switek
- Justin Theroux as Det. Larry Zito
- Barry Shabaka Henley as Lt. Martín Castillo
- Luis Tosar as Arcángel de Jesús Montoya
- John Ortiz as José Yero
- Isaach De Bankolé as 'Neptune'
- John Hawkes as Alonzo Stevens
- Tom Towles as Coleman
- Eddie Marsan as Nicholas
- Mario Ernesto Sánchez as El Tiburon
- Pasha D. Lychnikoff as Ivan
- Ana Cristina Oliveira as Bartender
- Oleg Taktarov as Russian Security
- Tony Curran and Don Frye as Aryan Brothers

Cast from the AFI Catalog of Feature Films.

== Production ==
=== Development ===
Jamie Foxx brought up the idea of a Miami Vice film to Michael Mann during a party for Ali. This led Mann to revisit the series he helped create.

Like Collateral, which also starred Foxx, most of the film was shot with the Thomson Viper FilmStream Camera, while Super 35 was used for high-speed and underwater shots. Cinematographer Dion Beebe was also Collateral's cinematographer.

The suits that Jamie Foxx wore in the film were designed by noted fashion designer Ozwald Boateng. He had worked with Foxx in the past and caught Mann's eye, who then asked him to work on the film. Michael Kaplan was responsible for the costume design overall.

=== Filming ===
The film was shot on location in the Caribbean, Uruguay, Paraguay (Ciudad del Este), and South Florida. Uruguay locations included the seaside resort Atlántida standing in for Havana, the old building of the Carrasco International Airport, and the Rambla waterfront avenue and the Old City in Montevideo. The production was characterized as being troubled, marked by a series of delays and conflicts. Seven days of filming were lost to hurricanes Katrina, Rita, and Wilma. The delays led to a budget of what some insiders claimed to be over $150 million, though Universal Pictures says it cost $135 million. Several crew members criticized Mann's decisions during production, which featured sudden script changes, filming in unsafe weather conditions, and choosing locations that "even the police avoid, drafting gang members to work as security". Mann wanted the film to be as realistic as possible and took Farrell along on what were thought to be real drug busts undertaken by FBI drug squads, though these were later found to have been staged.

Foxx was also characterized as unpleasant to work with. He had won an Academy Award for his performance in Ray after signing onto the film, and subsequently called for upgrades in his salary and other compensation. He demanded top billing in the film's credits and was also said to have complained that he was paid less than Farrell; Foxx's salary was raised considerably and Farrell's was cut slightly to address this. Foxx also refused to fly commercially, successfully lobbying Universal to hire a private jet for him. He also objected to filming scenes shot on boats or planes. Eventually, after gunshots were fired on set in the Dominican Republic on October 24, 2005, Foxx left the country and returned to the United States. This forced the production to abandon the script's intended ending, slated to be shot in Paraguay, and revert to a previously discarded one that Mann had written, which was set in Miami. One crew member later opined that the Miami-based ending was the dramatically inferior of the two, though Mann said that he came to prefer it.

Sal Magluta, the drug trafficker identified by Tubbs as running go-fast boats in the film's opening scenes, is in fact one of Miami's real-life reputed "Cocaine Cowboys" and is currently serving a life sentence for money laundering.

The first teaser trailer to appear for the film featured the Linkin Park and Jay-Z song "Numb/Encore". This trailer was attached to the release of King Kong in theaters. For several months before its release, the official web site hosted the first teaser trailer for download as a High-Definition WMV file.

=== Music ===
Mann took efforts to distance the film from the television series; this extended to his choices for music, as he declined to use the show's theme song and did not ask series composer Jan Hammer to work on the film's score. Hammer said, "I was completely surprised they didn't have a remake of [the theme]. I think it's a matter of being too cool for school." The musical score was composed by John Murphy, with additional cues by Klaus Badelt, Mark Batson and Tim Motzer.

Phil Collins' famous hit "In the Air Tonight", which was featured in the television series' pilot episode, is featured in the original film as a cover done by Miami-based rock band Nonpoint during the closing credits and on the soundtrack. Mann's "Director's Edit" released on DVD places the song in the film just prior to the climactic gun battle as suggested by members of the production crew during post-production.

1. Nonpoint – "In the Air Tonight"
2. Moby featuring Patti LaBelle – "One of These Mornings"
3. Mogwai – "We're No Here"
4. Nina Simone – "Sinnerman (Felix da Housecat's Heavenly House Mix)"
5. Mogwai – "Auto Rock"
6. Manzanita – "Arranca"
7. India.Arie – "Ready for Love"
8. Goldfrapp – "Strict Machine"
9. Emilio Estefan – "Pennies in My Pocket"
10. King Britt – "New World in My View"
11. Blue Foundation – "Sweep"
12. Moby – "Anthem"
13. Freaky Chakra – "Blacklight Fantasy"
14. John Murphy – "Mercado Nuevo"
15. John Murphy – "Who Are You"
16. King Britt & Tim Motzer – "Ramblas"
17. Klaus Badelt & Mark Batson – "A-500"

The RZA was supposed to contribute to the film's score but dropped out for unknown reasons. Atlanta based producers Organized Noize were brought in to take RZA's place instead.

The music included on the soundtrack has several differences from what was featured in the film:

- Of the first four songs featured in the film's first sequence in The Mansion nightclub, three are on the soundtrack and Nina Simone's "Sinnerman" is the only song to be featured in its original form. Jay-Z and Linkin Park's "Numb/Encore" is not found on the soundtrack despite being featured in both of the film's trailers and being the first song in the film. Furthermore, the version of Goldfrapp's "Strict Machine" is the We Are Glitter remix of the song, and both it and Freaky Chakra's "Blacklight Fantasy" are edits from Sasha's mix album Fundacion NYC. Neither version appears on the soundtrack.
- Clips of two Audioslave songs, "Wide Awake" and "Shape of Things to Come", are featured in the film, but the songs do not appear on the soundtrack.
- The version of Moby's "Anthem" on the soundtrack does not appear in the film. Instead, prominent placement is given to Moby's "Cinematic Version" of the song.
- King Britt's "New World in My View" is featured in the film but is missing the spoken-word lyrics of Sister Gertrude. The song plays instrumentally in the background at one point in the film.

== Reception ==
=== Box office ===
Miami Vice opened at No. 1 in the United States, knocking Pirates of the Caribbean: Dead Man's Chest out of the number one position at the box office that weekend, after Pirates led the box office for almost a full month. In its opening weekend, the film grossed over $25.7 million at 3,021 theaters nationwide, with an average gross of $8,515 per theater. The film would go on to earn $63.5 million in Canada and the US. Miami Vice would fare better internationally. It opened in the UK with $2.8 million in its opening weekend, beating Cars to reach the number one spot. The film was released in a total 77 countries overseas, grossing $100,344,039 in its international run. Overall the film grossed $164 million worldwide against a reported $135 million budget.

=== Initial critical response ===
On review aggregator Rotten Tomatoes, Miami Vice holds an approval rating of 47% based on 226 reviews, with an average rating of 5.7/10. The website's critical consensus reads: "Miami Vice is beautifully shot but the lead characters lack the charisma of their TV series counterparts, and the underdeveloped story is well below the standards of Michael Mann's better films." On Metacritic it holds a score of 66 out of 100 based on 37 critics, indicating "generally favorable reviews". Audiences polled by CinemaScore gave the film an average grade of "B-" on an A+ to F scale.

The film received praise from major publications including Rolling Stone, Empire, Variety, Newsweek, New York, The Village Voice, The Boston Globe, Entertainment Weekly, and film critic Richard Roeper on the television program Ebert & Roeper. The New York Times critic Manohla Dargis declared it "glorious entertainment" in her year-end wrap-up and praised its innovative use of digital photography.

The film received negative reviews from The Washington Post and the Los Angeles Times, focusing in part on comparisons with the 1980s series and on the plot.

It was included in the top ten of 2006 by Scott Foundas (LA Weekly) at #7, and by Manohla Dargis at #8. Additionally, in November 2009, the critics of Time Out New York named Miami Vice the 35th best film of the decade, saying:

Writer-director Michael Mann brilliantly rethinks the seminal 1980s TV series on which he made his name. The hi-def videography gives a tactile, scorching sense of the characters' surroundings, and Colin Farrell and Gong Li's doomed love affair bears the full tragic brunt of Mann's mesmerizing on-the-fly narrative.

=== Retrospective reviews ===
In 2016, critic Steven Hyden wrote that Miami Vice had developed "a burgeoning reputation as a cult favorite, especially among younger critics and filmmakers who consider it a touchstone in their love of movies." Hyden wrote that the focus on "gloomy atmosphere and visual sensation" over plot and dialogue (much of which, he wrote, was "incomprehensible") made the film a visual meditation on "failure and futility" that was "one of the most expensive art films ever made." In Senses of Cinema, French director and critic Jean-Baptiste Thoret praised the film's digital aesthetic, extreme pace, and philosophical undertones; he called Miami Vice "a radical work that does not give up its author's formal and stylistic ambitions" and "an inspired synthesis of impressionism and hyper-realism," and said the film "has also just laid the foundations for a new order of action films."

Director Harmony Korine cited Miami Vice as a major influence on his 2012 film Spring Breakers. "The reason I love [Mann's] movies, and that movie in particular," Korine said, "is I could feel the place. When I watch that film, I don't even pay attention to what they're saying or the storyline. I love the colors, I love the texture."

Miami Vice was named the 95th best action film of all time in a 2014 Time Out poll of film critics, directors, actors and stunt actors.

In a 2023 retrospective ranking of Mann's films, The A.V. Club placed Miami Vice second, describing it as a "harder, dirtier, and more abstract crime film" than the original television series. The publication praised its digital cinematography, fractured editing, atmosphere, and the romance between Crockett and Isabella, arguing that the film takes the artistic ambitions of Heat and transforms them into "concentrated genius."

In July 2025, it was one of the films voted for the "Readers' Choice" edition of The New York Times' list of "The 100 Best Movies of the 21st Century," finishing at number 286.

=== Cast and crew response ===
In subsequent years, Michael Mann made it clear that he considers Miami Vice to be the movie that "got away"—in large part because of the hastily revised ending, which moved the conclusion from an elaborate battle in Ciudad del Este to a smaller shootout in Miami based on an earlier version of the script. Speaking with New York magazine on the film's tenth anniversary, the director described his disappointment with the film: "I don't know how I feel about it. I know the ambition behind it, but it didn't fulfill that ambition for me because we couldn't shoot the real ending."

Talking about the film again in 2023, Mann had a stronger positive view, remarking that he "loved the movie" while still criticizing the ending: "I would make the movie all over again. It doesn't have its proper ending. [...] there's a very different ending that belonged on that film. But no, there are parts of it—the whole Cuba interlude was fabulous."

Colin Farrell was also critical of the film, describing it as "style over substance" and accepting "a good bit of the responsibility". He felt that the relationship between Crockett and Tubbs lacked some of the humor and friendship he shared with Jamie Foxx off-camera. In a later interview, Farrell called this his "biggest misgiving" with the film, explaining: "It was never gonna be Lethal Weapon, but just a little bit more of the banter that we had." Reflecting on the film's changing reputation, Farrell said that Miami Vice "got slapped around a bit" upon release, but acknowledged its subsequent reappraisal, remarking: "I heard from someone that people like it now."

== Home media ==
Miami Vice was released to DVD on December 12, 2006. It contained many extra features the theatrical version did not include, as well as an extended Director's cut of the film, with a running time of 139 minutes. It was one of the first HD DVD/DVD combo discs to be released by Universal Studios and one of the best-selling DVDs of 2006. It debuted in third place (behind Pirates of the Caribbean: Dead Man's Chest and Superman Returns) and managed to sell over a million copies in its first week alone. As of February 11, 2007, Miami Vice had grossed over $36.45 million in rentals.

On August 26, 2008, Universal Studios released the "Unrated Director's Edition" of Miami Vice on Blu-ray, which includes an audio commentary featuring Mann.

On May 16, 2023, a Wal-Mart exclusive steelbook release of the film by Mill Creek Entertainment was released, containing both the theatrical cut and the unrated director's cut.

In June 2025, it was announced that Shout! Factory would release a 4K UHD Blu-Ray release of the film as a part of the Shout Select label. No further updates came until September 2026, where it was announced that the Shout! 4K UHD Blu-Ray would include a new "Director's Final Cut" of the film, along with the previous two cuts in a 5-disc set. The new cut premiered at Beyond Fest on October 3, with a runtime of 133 minutes, one minute longer than the theatrical cut but six minutes shorter than the unrated director's cut. The 4K UHD set will release on December 15.

== Video game ==
A third-person shooter video game, Miami Vice: The Game, was released on July 18, 2006, as a tie-in to the film. It was developed by Rebellion Developments and published by Vivendi Universal Games, exclusively for the PlayStation Portable.

== Reboot ==
On April 28, 2025, a new film adaptation directed by Joseph Kosinski, and written by Dan Gilroy and Eric Warren Singer was announced. It was originally scheduled to release on August 6, 2027. In October 2025, Austin Butler and Michael B. Jordan were reported to be in early talks to portray Sonny Crockett and Ricardo Tubbs. In April 2026, the two were officially announced as Crockett and Tubbs with the film being retitled to Miami Vice '85, and the film was rescheduled to be released on May 19, 2028. In August 2026, Alden Ehrenreich, Whitney Peak, Camila Morrone and Danny Ramirez joined the cast. In September 2026, John Leguizamo was cast in the role of the villain, Andrew Schulz, Edi Gathegi, and Walton Goggins also joined the cast. In October 2026, Michael Irby was cast as Lt. Lou Rodriguez, André Holland also joined the cast. The film will be shot for IMAX. Production began in October 2026, with a first look at Butler and Jordan as Crockett and Tubbs released on October 12.

== See also ==
- List of films based on television programs
