= Superheroes of BMX =

Song by Mogwai

from the EP 4 Satin
- Released: 26 May 1997
- Studio: MCM Studios, Hamilton, Scotland
- Genre: Post-rock
- Length: 8:03
- Label: Chemikal Underground, Jetset
- Composers: Dominic Aitchison; Stuart Braithwaite
- Producer: Andy Miller

4 Satin EP
- 3 Tracks: 1. "Superheroes of BMX"; 2. "Now You're Taken"; 3. "Stereodee"

Audio sample
- file; help

EP+6 track listing
- 10 tracks: 1. "Superheroes of BMX"; 2. "Now You're Taken"; 3. "Stereodee"; 4. "Xmas Steps"; 5. "Rollerball"; 6. "Small Children in the Background"; 7. "Stanley Kubrick"; 8. "Christmas Song"; 9. "Burn Girl Prom-Queen"; 10. "Rage:Man"

Government Commissions: BBC Sessions 1996-2003 track listing
- 10 tracks: 1. "Hunted by a Freak"; 2. "R U Still in 2 It"; 3. "New Paths to Helicon Pt II"; 4. "Kappa"; 5. "Cody"; 6. "Like Herod"; 7. "Secret Pint"; 8. "Superheroes of BMX"; 9. "New Paths to Helicon Pt I"; 10. "Stop Coming to My House"

"Superheroes of BMX" is 1997 a song by the Scottish post-rock group Mogwai, released on their 4 Satin EP and on the 2000 compilation album EP+6.

== Musical and structure ==
"Superheroes of BMX" is an eight-minute-long instrumental which makes use of a Bontempi Organ, which is built upon throughout the song. The song features an electronic drum beat produced through a BOSS DR-550 Dr. Rhythm drum machine. A live version of the song appeared on the live compilation album, Government Commissions: BBC Sessions 1996-2003, recorded at The Golders Green Hippodrome on December 22, 1996 by John Peel. The "whooshing" noise heard in the song is made by a RoboCop figurine, which can be seen briefly in The Recording of Mr. Beast documentary. The song was originally titled "Dominic", after Dominic Aitchison, Mogwai's bassist.

Similar to their song "Tracy", the track begins with recorded a phone call (which can be heard throughout most of the song) between Stuart Braithwaite and friend David Jack, whilst an electronic drumbeat plays. At (0:18), they are joined by the sound of a Bontempi Organ playing an A♯ major chord, followed by a D minor chord, which is repeated throughout the song. Layers of synth and a guitar riff play over the chords. A whooshing noise can be heard at various points. At (1:56) acoustic drums can be heard playing the drumbeat, until (2:30), when it goes back to electronic drums. At (3:53), distorted guitars begin playing along and feedbacking with the chords in the background. This guitar noise and feedback continues, fading in and out gradually for the next few minutes, until it becomes almost overbearing, at which point the song ends abruptly.

== Legacy ==
The track was one of the earliest singles to bring Mogwai to critical acclaim. "Superheroes of BMX" was an early band name for the English indie rock group Bloc Party.

== Personnel ==
- Stuart Braithwaite – guitar, organ, monologue
- Dominic Aitchison – bass guitar
- John Cummings – guitar
- Martin Bulloch – drums
- David Jack – monologue
- Andy Miller – producer, mixer
