= Digital Dirt =

Digital Dirt may refer to:

- "Digital Dirt", a song by The Magnificents from their self-titled album
- "Digital Dirt", a song by Zion I & The Grouch from Heroes in the City of Dope
