= Glasgow Mega-Snake =

Instrumental by Mogwai

from the album Mr Beast
- Released: 6 March 2006; 8 March 2006 (US)
- Studio: Castle of Doom, Glasgow, Scotland
- Genre: Post-rock; instrumental rock; space rock
- Length: 3:35
- Label: Play It Again Sam; Matador
- Songwriters: Francis Barry Burns; John Cummings
- Producer: Tony Doogan

"Glasgow Mega-Snake" is a song by Scottish post-rock band Mogwai from their fifth album, Mr Beast.

== Overview ==
"Glasgow Mega-Snake" is a live favourite. It originally had the working title of "Glower of a Cat". Stuart Braithwaite has commented on the song, saying

We had this idea to promote Glasgow by genetically modifying a sea-creature and somehow make it into a roller coaster, People will flock to Scotland when it's made. We wrote the song in the hope that we can sell it to Channel 5 when they do The Making of the Mega-Snake programme. We've got it sewn up.

== In popular culture ==
- The song is featured in the Tony Hawk video game Tony Hawk's Project 8.
- The song is featured in the announcement trailer for the Dead Space 2 multiplayer.
- The song featured in the 2012 video game Spec Ops: The Line.
