= UK/European Tour EP =

EP by Mogwai
- Released: 2 November 2001
- Genre: Instrumental rock
- Length: 27:56

Mogwai chronology
My Father My King (2001)	UK/European Tour EP (2001)	Happy Songs for Happy People (2003)

UK/European Tour EP is an EP by the Scottish group Mogwai, released in 2001.

== Overview ==
UK/European Tour EP was sold as merchandise on Mogwai's tour of the UK and Europe in November–December 2001. It compiles tracks from various sources released in 2001. "Close Encounters" is a bonus track on the Japanese version of the album, Rock Action. "Drum Machine" and "D to E" are from the US Tour EP, and the live versions of "You Don't Know Jesus" and "Helicon 1" are bonus tracks on the Japanese, Australian, and New Zealand versions of the "My Father My King" single.

== Track listing ==
All songs were written by Mogwai.

1. "Close Encounters" – 3:55
2. "Drum Machine" – 3:30
3. "D to E" – 6:04
4. "You Don't Know Jesus (Live)" – 6:14
5. "Helicon 1 (Live)" – 7:53

== Personnel ==
- Stuart Braithwaite – guitar, keyboard
- Dominic Aitchison – bass guitar
- John Cummings – guitar
- Barry Burns – guitar, piano
- Martin Bulloch – drums

== Release history ==
UK/European Tour EP was released in 2001.

Region	Date	Label	Format	Catalog
Europe	2 November 2001	-	CD	-
