= Miami Vice: The Game =

2006 video game

- North American cover art
- Developer: Rebellion Developments
- Publisher: Vivendi Universal Games
- Platform: PlayStation Portable
- Release: NA: July 18, 2006; EU: July 21, 2006; AU: August 3, 2006
- Genre: Third-person shooter
- Modes: Single-player, multiplayer

Miami Vice: The Game is a third-person shooter for the PlayStation Portable. It was released as a tie-in with the 2006 film of the same name. The likenesses of the narcotics officers Crockett and Tubbs are based on Colin Farrell and Jamie Foxx, respectively.

== Plot ==
Set before the events of the film, the focus of the game is to bring down a South American drug lord known as Sacrenegra, whom the authorities are unable to link to his operations. As the player advances through the levels as either Crockett or Tubbs, they get deeper and deeper into the drug operation, and closer to bringing down Sacrenegra.

== Gameplay ==
While going through levels, the majority of the gameplay is combat, with enemies who must be killed to advance the level. Emphasis is put on taking cover, with health running out quite fast if player remains in the open during a shoot-out. All fire-arms have laser sightings, which acts as an aiming reticule.

The player may also deal drugs amongst other suppliers, both buying and selling. Drugs can be bought at one point and kept for several days, in which they may increase in value, thus making a profit for the player. Additionally, varying drugs can be obtained throughout each of the levels, and sold for a profit once the level is complete. Drugs can also be sold to informants for information.

Throughout each level, FlashRams can be recovered and later "hacked" at the police station. "Hacking" resembles that of an arcade game, in which a certain score must be obtained through destroying boxes, which often fire at the player icon. Each FlashRam contains three levels, which increase in difficulty. Completion of hacking a FlashRam unlocks stated extras, such as the ability to upgrade firearms, and locate drug dealers.

Money earned can be spent on buying and upgrading weapons, buying suits (thus building a reputation for the player) and buying armour (thus protecting the player).

The firearms in the game can be summed up into three basic categories:

1. Pistols
2. Shotguns
3. Machine Guns

Each of these weapons can be upgraded, giving them larger magazines, better accuracy, and higher power, thus killing enemies more effectively.

== Reception ==
Reception

Aggregate score
Aggregator	Score
Metacritic	63/100

Review scores
Publication	Score
Edge	6/10
Eurogamer	5/10
Famitsu	28/40
Game Informer	6.75/10
GamePro	2.75/5
GameRevolution	C−
GameSpot	7.3/10
GameSpy	2.5/5
GameZone	6.8/10
IGN	6.6/10
Official U.S. PlayStation Magazine	3/10
The Sydney Morning Herald	2.5/5
The Times	3/5

The game received "mixed" reviews according to video game review aggregator Metacritic. In Japan, Famitsu gave it a score of one eight, one six, and two sevens for a total of 28 out of 40.

== See also ==
- Miami Vice (film)
- Miami Vice (TV series)
- Miami Vice (1986 video game)
