= We're No Here =

Song by Mogwai

from the album Mr Beast
- Released: 6 March 2006
- Studio: Castle of Doom, Glasgow, Scotland
- Genre: Post-rock
- Length: 5:39
- Label: Rock Action
- Songwriter(s): Francis Barry Burns
- Producer(s): Tony Doogan

"We're No Here" is a song by Scottish post-rock band, Mogwai, from their 2006 album, Mr Beast. It has been used in a number of films and television programmes. It is one of the more basic, heavier, rock-oriented songs from Mr Beast, often being used as a set closer - usually ending in a sonic assault of feedback. The title is apparently based on a Celtic football club chant about former manager Martin O'Neill.

== Uses ==
- Miami Vice soundtrack
- Torchwood episode "Cyberwoman"
- Top Gear Season 9 Episode 3's American Roadtrip.
- Les Revenants, for which Mogwai wrote the soundtrack.
