= Year of Explorers =

Year Of Explorers

Studio album by The Magnificents
- Released: August 2007
- Recorded: Metway Studios, Brighton. Castle of Doom Studios, Glasgow and M-Bunker, Edinburgh.
- Genre: Electro, Punk, Alternative.
- Length: 37:46
- Label: KFM Records, Mush Records.
- Producer: Damian Taylor. John Cummings and The Magnificents.

The Magnificents chronology
The Magnificents (2004)	Year Of Explorers (2007)

Professional ratings
Review scores
Source	Rating
Drowned In Sound	(8/10)
NME	(7/10)
Popmatters	(7/10)
The List	4/5 stars
The Skinny	4/5 stars

Year of Explorers is the second studio album by the Scottish electro rock band The Magnificents.

== Track listing ==
All tracks written by The Magnificents.

1. "Ring Ring Oo Oo" – 4:57
2. "Can't Explode" – 3:11
3. "Get It Boy" – 3:22
4. "No Dialogue With Cunts" – 2:50
5. "How Longs Gone" – 3:58
6. "(......)" – 1:15
7. "Yellow Hand" – 3:04
8. "Year Of Explorers" – 3:53
9. "Dedridge Cowboys" – 3:33
10. "Learn One Thing" – 3:31
11. "Tiger Choir" – 4:04

== Production ==
Tracks 1, 3 and 8 were recorded at Metway Studios, Brighton, with Damian Taylor producing. All other tracks were produced by John Cummings and The Magnificents at Castle of Doom Studios, Glasgow, and the M- Bunker, Edinburgh.

== US release ==
Mush Records re-released the album in the United States on 9 December 2008 on the imprint The Scottish Legion Of Illuminated Magnificents. This is the first in a series of releases of the bands back catalogue.
