= The Magnificents (Scottish band) =

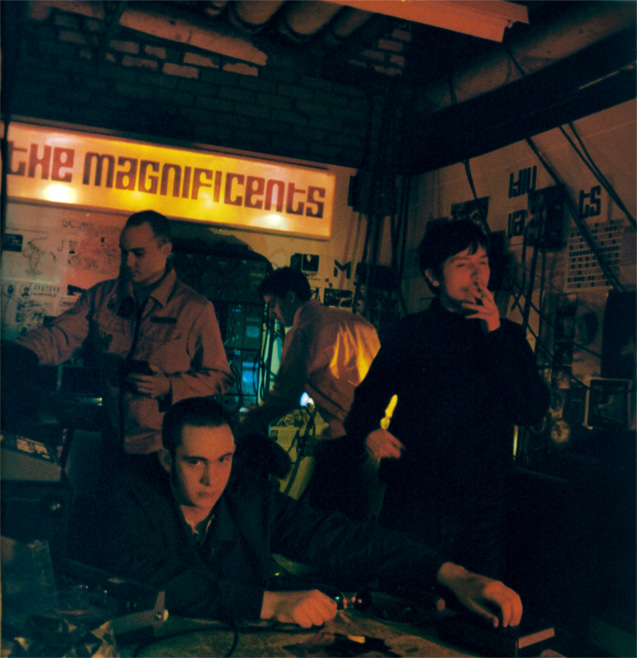
- _{Left to right: Steven, Tommy, Casey, Drew}

Background information
- Origin: Edinburgh, Scotland
- Genres: Electro; Post-punk; Experimental rock
- Years active: 2000–2008
- Labels: Erkrankung Durch Musique; Scandinavia Records; KFM Records; Mush Records
- Members: Casey Miller; Drew McFadyen; Steven McGregor; Tommy Stuart
- Website: www.kfmrecords.com www.myspace.com/themagnificents

The Magnificents were a Scottish electro rock band.

== Biography ==
The group formed while its members attended the Edinburgh College of Art. After playing a supposed one-off gig of Northern Soul covers for a friend's birthday party they began to write their own material and settled into a lineup of Tommy Stuart (vocals/synths), Steven McGregor (synths/vocals), Drew McFadyen (guitar/vocals) and Casey Miller (drums).

Incorporating elements of Krautrock, electro and noise music they combine vintage analogue synthesizers with distorted guitar and the aggression of punk creating a sound described by the NME as, "a wonder to behold... synth-punk sass in excelsis; a tangle of disco and hysterical sloganeering that sounds, precisely, like Nobody Else Ever". They soon gained a reputation as both a riotously exciting and volatile live act.

They recorded their first EP Kids Now at their own M-Bunker studio which was released on German label Erkrankung Durch Musique in 2001. This led to the group's first tour overseas visiting Germany, Austria and Switzerland and a series of supports with established alternative bands visiting Scotland such as Stereolab, Broadcast, Trans Am and Enon.

After the release of 2003's more electronic based 4 Claws Of The Underground EP on Scandinavia Records, the band recorded their self titled debut album. Now recording for KFM Records the sessions took place at The Diving Bell Lounge Studio in Glasgow. Released in early 2004, the album was generally well received and gained airplay from the likes of Vic Galloway, Stuart Maconie and the late John Peel. That same year the band were invited to Austin, Texas to play at the SXSW Music Festival and supported The Beta Band on their final UK tour.

The group have also recorded various live radio sessions, including for BBC Radio 1, BBC Radio Scotland and featured on the BBC Radio 3 programme Mixing It about experimental music in Scotland.

In 2005 the band entered Metway Studio in Brighton and recorded three tracks with producer Damien Taylor which would eventually be on the band's second album Year Of Explorers. In 2006 they went on their most extensive tour to date, supporting fellow Scots Mogwai on their European tour. Following this, work was completed on Year Of Explorers at Castle of Doom Studios with Mogwais' John Cummings producing. The album was preceded by the Ring Ring EP in May 2007 before its August release.

== Trivia ==
- The song "Get It Boy" appeared on the soundtrack of UEFA Euro 2008 game.
- The song "Kids Now" featured in the Cartoon Network show Codename: Kids Next Door
- The band designed their own merchandise, sleeve artwork and video projections used at concerts.

== Discography ==
- Kids Now EP - 2001
- "Digital Dirt" / "The Third Claw" (7" single) - 2003
- 4 Claws Of The Underground EP - 2003
- The Magnificents - 2004
- "Last Gasp Of Revenge"/ "White Lies" (7" single) - 2005
- "The Apollo Creed" (Download single) - 2005
- Ring Ring EP - 2007
- Year of Explorers (Album) - 2007
- "Get It Boy" (Download single) - 2007
