= The Fountain (soundtrack) =

The Fountain: Music from the Motion Picture

Soundtrack album by Clint Mansell with the Kronos Quartet and Mogwai
- Released: November 27, 2006
- Recorded: Mogwai: December 2005, Castle of Doom Studios, Glasgow, Scotland, United Kingdom; Choir: January 8, 2006, Right Track Studios, New York City, New York, United States; Kronos Quartet: January 2006, Skywalker Sound, Nicasio, California, United States; Randy Kerber: February 2006, Capitol Recording Studios, Hollywood, California, United States
- Genres: Contemporary classical, Instrumental rock
- Length: 46:21
- Language: Instrumental
- Label: Nonesuch
- Producers: Tony Doogan, Geoff Foster, and Scott Fraser

Clint Mansell chronology
Doom (2005)	The Fountain: Music from the Motion Picture (2006)	Trust the Man (2006)

Kronos Quartet chronology
You’ve Stolen My Heart: Songs From R.D. Burman's Bollywood with Asha Bhosle (2005)	The Fountain (2006)	Henryk Górecki: String Quartet No. 3 ('...songs are sung') (2007)

Mogwai chronology
Zidane: A 21st Century Portrait (2006)	The Fountain (2006)	Batcat (2008)

The Fountain: Music from the Motion Picture is the soundtrack album to the 2006 film The Fountain directed by Darren Aronofsky. Released on November 27, 2006, through Nonesuch Records, the album is a collaboration between contemporary classical composer and frequent Aronofsky collaborator Clint Mansell, classical string quartet the Kronos Quartet, and post-rock band Mogwai. The score received mixed reviews from critics and was nominated for several awards.

== Recording ==
Clint Mansell—the composer for Aronofsky's previous films Pi and Requiem for a Dream—reprised his role for The Fountain. The San Francisco-based string quartet Kronos Quartet—who previously performed for the Requiem for a Dream soundtrack—and Scottish post-rock band Mogwai also contributed to the film score. Darren Aronofsky hoped that David Bowie—whose song "Space Oddity" helped influence the film's space traveler storyline—would record a song when the musical artist worked briefly with composer Clint Mansell during production. Aronofsky planned for Bowie to rework pieces of the score and to vocalize them, but the plan was unsuccessful. After the score was completed, Nonesuch Records, the home of The Fountain musical contributor Kronos Quartet, released the soundtrack on November 21, 2006.

Mansell researched possible scores to compose one tying together the three storylines. He sought to have an organic feeling to the score and explored implementing orchestral and electronic elements that would have "a real human element to them that breathes". Contrary to most films' scores composed in post-production, Mansell's score was composed concurrently with the film's production; he created a mood that flourished as the film progressed. The composer described the parallel process, "It's instinct and listening to what the film is telling you it needs".

Mansell drew from five to six years of writing material for The Fountain. The composer planned for the score to be pure percussion when the film was first meant to be epic in scale. Mansell, lacking classical training, collaborated with arranger Justin Skomarovsky in creating the score. They deconstructed the composer's initial pieces for The Fountain and re-played them in a key so the lead melodies could harmonically play with every progression. The song "Together We Will Live Forever" was an electronic piece designed by Mansell to be the protagonist's memory theme. Antony Hegarty, lead singer of Antony and the Johnsons, was commissioned to create a vocal piece over Skomarovsky's piano arrangement of "Together We Will Live Forever" for the end credits, but the director decided that the vocals would not be appropriate to end the film. The song was ultimately performed by pianist Randy Kerber.

== Marketing and reception ==
Professional ratings
Review scores
Source	Rating
The Guardian	Mixed
Pitchfork Media	5.9/10
Sputnik Music	4.5/5

The content and research agency Ramp Industry launched The Fountain Remixed, an official website driven by user-generated content. Users could download freely provided audio parts from The Fountain's film score, remix the music, and upload the work onto the website to be evaluated by other users.

Mansell won the Chicago Film Critics Association's 2006 award for Best Original Score, and he also won the World Soundtrack Award for Best Original Soundtrack of the Year and Public Choice Award. He was also nominated for the 2006 Golden Globe Award for Best Original Score for The Fountain, but lost to Alexandre Desplat for The Painted Veil. Mansell also lost a nomination for the 2006 BFCA Critics' Choice Award for Best Composer to Philip Glass for The Illusionist.

== Track listing ==
All music composed by Clint Mansell.

1. "The Last Man" – 6:09
2. "Holy Dread!" – 3:52
3. "Tree of Life" – 3:45
4. "Stay with Me" – 3:36
5. "Death Is a Disease" – 2:34
6. "Xibalba" – 5:23
7. "First Snow" – 3:09
8. "Finish It" – 4:25
9. "Death Is the Road to Awe" – 8:26
10. "Together We Will Live Forever" – 5:02

== Personnel ==
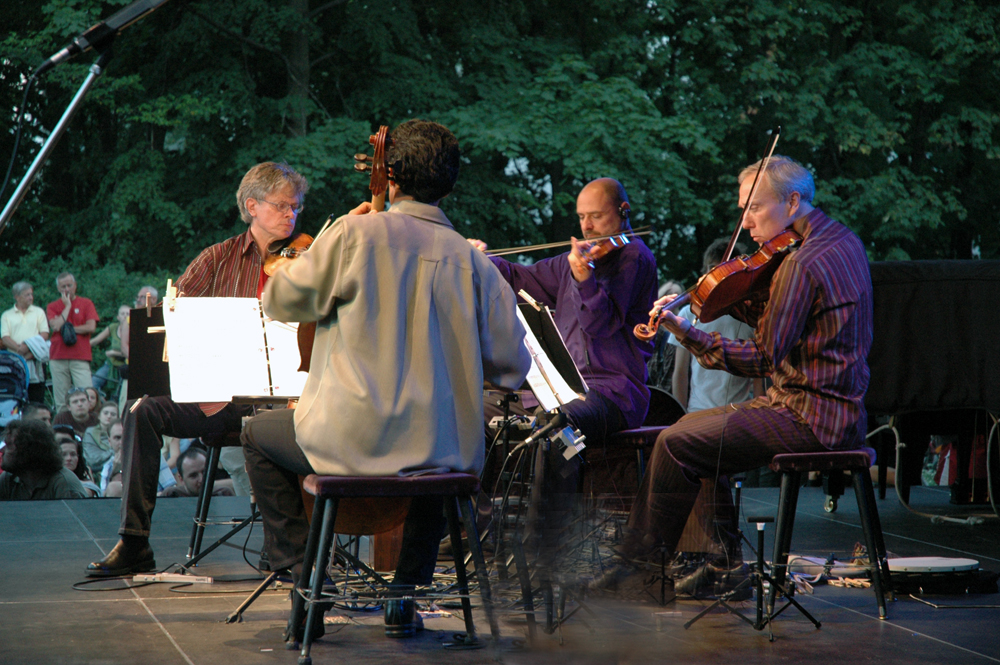
Composer Clint Mansell worked with the classical string section Kronos Quartet to provide the film's music.

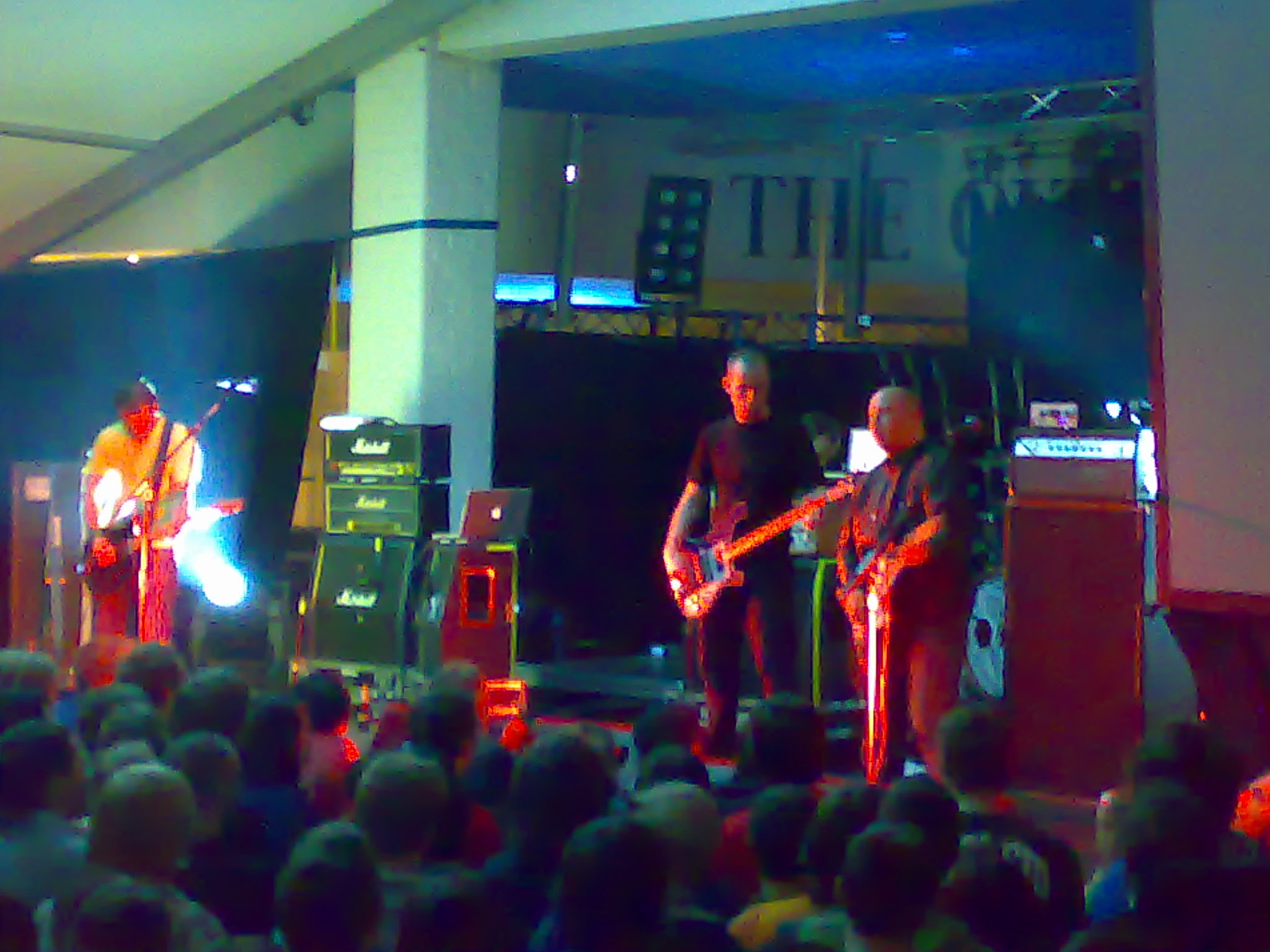
Mogwai recorded in their personal studio in Scotland.

Kronos Quartet

- Hank Dutt – viola and string arrangement
- David Harrington – violin and string arrangement
- John Sherba – violin and string arrangement
- Jeffrey Zeigler – cello and string arrangement

Mogwai

- Dominic Aitchison – bass guitar
- Stuart Braithwaite – guitar
- Martin Bulloch – drums
- Barry Burns – piano
- John Cummings – guitar

Additional performers

- James Bagwell – piano
- Martin Doner – tenor
- Misa Iwama – contralto
- Melissa Kelly – soprano
- Randy Kerber – piano
- Karen Krueger – contralto
- Drew Martin – tenor
- Christopher Roselli – bass singing
- Justin Skomarovsky – celesta, film score arrangement, glockenspiel, and programming
- Charles Sprawls – bass singing
- Kathy Theil – soprano

Technical personnel

- Ameoba Proteus – design
- Tony Doogan – production and engineering for Mogwai
- Geoff Foster – engineering, mixing, production, and sequencing for choir
- Scott Fraser – production and engineering for Kronos Quartet
- Bob Ludwig – mastering at Gateway Mastering Studios, Portland, Maine, United States
- Clint Mansell – production
- Dawn Thompson – assistant engineering for Kronos Quartet
- André Zeers – editing for Kronos Quartet
