= Revenant (disambiguation) =

A revenant is a corpse that has returned from the grave to terrorize the living in European folklore.

Revenant(s) or The Revenant(s) may also refer to:

== Film and television ==
- Le revenant, a 1903 film by Georges Méliès
- Le revenant or A Lover's Return, a 1946 French drama
- The Revenant (2009 film), a horror comedy
- The Revenant (2015 film), an epic Western adventure
- "Revenant", television series episode, see list of Batman Beyond episodes
- Revenant (TV series), a 2023 South Korean television series

== Literature ==
- Revenant (Buffy novel), based on the TV series Buffy the Vampire Slayer
- The Revenant (comics), published in various forms from 2001 to 2008
- The Revenant (novel), a 2002 novel by Michael Punke, basis for the 2015 film
- "The Revenant", a 2006 short story by Lucy Sussex

== Music ==
- Revenant Records, a record label set up by John Fahey
- The Revenant (soundtrack), a soundtrack album from the 2015 film
- Revenants (album) or the title song, by Conducting from the Grave, 2010
- "Revenant", a song by Anaïs Mitchell from Anaïs Mitchell (album), 2022

== Video games ==
- Revenant (video game), a 1999 game
- Revenant, a character in the video game Apex Legends
- Revenants, a type of enemy in the Doom series of video games, starting with Doom II.
- Revenant, a character in the Soulcaliber series

== Other uses ==
- Revenant Mountain, Alberta, Canada
- French corvette Revenant, an Age of Sail privateer
- The Revenant (horse), racehorse, winner of the 2020 Queen Elizabeth II Stakes
- The Revenants, 2012 Doctor Who audio play, from Doctor Who: The Companion Chronicles

== See also ==
- Les Revenants (disambiguation)
