= Atomic (Mogwai album) =

Soundtrack album by Mogwai
- Released: 1 April 2016
- Studio: Castle of Doom, Glasgow
- Length: 48:37
- Label: Rock Action
- Producer: Tony Doogan

Mogwai chronology
Central Belters (2015)	Atomic (2016)	Every Country's Sun (2017)

Singles from Atomic
- 1. "U-235" Released: 12 January 2016; 2. "Ether" Released: 8 February 2016; 3. "Bitterness Centrifuge" Released: 21 March 2016

Atomic is an original soundtrack album by Scottish post-rock band Mogwai, released on 1 April 2016 on Rock Action Records.

The music was originally composed for Mark Cousins' documentary Atomic, Living in Dread and Promise.

The album features entirely instrumental music from start to finish. The song titles allude to atomic bombs such as Little Boy and Tzar Bomba as well as scientific or military objects and concepts connected with nuclear power such as SCRAM, Uranium-235 and Pripyat, the abandoned city near the Chernobyl Nuclear Power Plant in Ukraine.

It is the first Mogwai album to not feature guitarist John Cummings, who left the band in 2015.

== Critical reception ==
Professional ratings
Aggregate scores
Source	Rating
Metacritic	77/100
Review scores
Source	Rating
The A.V. Club	B
Consequence of Sound	B
Drowned in Sound	7/10
Exclaim!	8/10
The Guardian	3/5 stars
musicOMH	4.5/5 stars
Pitchfork	7.1/10
PopMatters	9/10 stars

Atomic received largely positive reviews from contemporary music critics. At Metacritic, which assigns a normalized rating out of 100 to reviews from mainstream critics, the album received an average score of 77, based on 16 reviews, which indicates "generally favorable reviews".

Morgan Evans of PopMatters praised the album, stating, "It’s a thrill to hear Mogwai’s sense of control more than ever, conservative energy capping certain parts at a gentle murmur. Their work on the Les Revenants soundtrack was otherworldly, whereas it is astounding how Atomic, an album composed of reworked versions of the music recorded for the soundtrack to director Mark Cousins’ documentary Atomic: Living in Dread and Promise, has feet firmly planted in learning how to live with, if not love, the bomb. If you are impatient, you'll dread wondering if some of the songs are going anywhere, but most listeners will be fully rewarded with the promise that even the most ominous music on here is leading up to something transportive."

Dusty Henry of Consequence of Sound gave the album a favorable review, stating, "Atomic succeeds because of the band's willingness to dive into their muse and experiment. It's why they've achieved such high status in the subgenre. By taking on a subject larger than themselves, Mogwai are able to lose their identity in telling such a tragic story." Matthew Ritchie of Exclaim! praised the album, stating, "Atomic perfectly captures the band's recent progressions, ornate (the strings-centered 'Are You a Dancer?' and horn-heavy opening track 'Ether') or otherwise, and is undoubtedly one of the most consistent albums front-to-back from Mogwai's two-decade-long career."

== Track listing ==
All tracks are written by Mogwai.

No.	Title	Length
1.	"Ether"	5:10
2.	"Scram"	5:41
3.	"Bitterness Centrifuge"	4:51
4.	"U-235"	4:33
5.	"Pripyat"	4:19
6.	"Weak Force"	5:08
7.	"Little Boy"	3:51
8.	"Are You a Dancer?"	3:53
9.	"Tzar"	5:13
10.	"Fat Man"	5:58
Total length:		48:37

== Personnel ==
Mogwai

- Stuart Braithwaite – performing
- Dominic Aitchison – performing
- Martin Bulloch – performing
- Barry Burns – performing

Additional performers

- Robert Newth – french horn (1)
- Luke Sutherland – violin (8)
- Robin Proper-Sheppard – guitar (9)

Production

- Tony Doogan – recording, production, mixing
- Frank Arkwright – mastering

== Charts ==
Chart (2016)	Peak position
Belgian Albums (Ultratop Flanders)	28
Belgian Albums (Ultratop Wallonia)	44
French Albums (SNEP)	77
German Albums (Offizielle Top 100)	55
Swiss Albums (Schweizer Hitparade)	38
UK Albums (Official Charts)	20
