= Now You're Taken =

Song by Mogwai

from the EP 4 Satin
- Released: 26 May 1997
- Recorded: Edinburgh, Scotland
- Length: 7:00
- Label: Chemikal Underground, Jetset
- Songwriter(s): Dominic Aitchison, Aidan Moffat
- Producer(s): Jamie Harley

4 Satin EP
- 3 Tracks: 1. "Superheroes of BMX"; 2. "Now You're Taken"; 3. "Stereodee"

Audio sample
- file; help

EP+6 track listing
- 10 tracks: 1. "Superheroes of BMX"; 2. "Now You're Taken"; 3. "Stereodee"; 4. "Xmas Steps"; 5. "Rollerball"; 6. "Small Children in the Background"; 7. "Stanley Kubrick"; 8. "Christmas Song"; 9. "Burn Girl Prom-Queen"; 10. "Rage:Man"

"Now You're Taken" is a song by Scottish post-rock group Mogwai, which originally appeared on the 4 Satin EP in 1997, then later on the compilation album EP+6 in 2000.

== Overview ==
"Now You're Taken" is the first song to feature Aidan Moffat on guest vocals for Mogwai; he later wrote lyrics and sang vocals on the song "R U Still in 2 It" from Mogwai Young Team. It is one of the few early Mogwai songs to feature vocals. It was only performed live a few times in 1997 with Aidan Moffat as a live guest on vocals in Stoke-on-Trent and at the Duchess of York pub in Leeds (amongst other cities).

== Musical composition ==
The song begins with a guitar playing a quiet harmonic-laden melody, with an additional guitar playing a soft counter melody first audible at (0:13). At (0:27), the main melody of the song begins, being played by guitar and bass:

with a ride cymbal keeping the beat. After repeating the melody, a simple drumbeat enters at (0:51). The melody is repeated, until (2:21), when Aidan Moffat begins singing. A (2:41), (on the line "Will he be in the pub tonight?"), the drumbeat ends. At (3:34), the drums enter once again, and all the instruments repeat the main melody until (4:42), when the drums stop, and Moffat sings the final lines of the song ("Like a bird, a feather bed, my sister says, and we'll get wed/And I should tell you that I adore you, but I'm sure that I'd just bore you"). The bass continues to play the main melody, while the guitars play separate counter-melodies. At (6:00) the bass stops playing the melody, leaving the guitars to play the counter-melodies, until (6:51), when the song ends.

== Personnel ==
- Stuart Braithwaite – guitar
- Dominic Aitchison – bass guitar
- John Cummings – guitar
- Martin Bulloch – drums
- Aidan Moffat – vocals
- Jamie Harley – producer, mixer
