= Les Revenants (album) =

Soundtrack album by Mogwai
- Released: 25 February 2013
- Genre: Post-rock, soundtrack
- Length: 49:05
- Label: Rock Action
- Producer: Mogwai

Mogwai chronology
A Wrenched Virile Lore (2012)	Les Revenants (2013)	Rave Tapes (2014)

Les Revenants is an original soundtrack album by Mogwai, for the French TV series of the same name. Mogwai were initially contacted by producers of the television show, and asked to begin producing music after reading only a few translated scripts. An extended play of the soundtrack, Les Revenants EP, was released in 2012, and the full album was released on 25 February 2013.

== Background and production ==
Mogwai had previously produced well-received soundtracks for documentary Zidane: A 21st Century Portrait and Darren Aronofsky's film The Fountain. These were released as albums Zidane: A 21st Century Portrait and The Fountain, both in 2006. Daniel Ross, writing for the BBC, compared Les Revenants to these previous soundtracks, saying that it is "a little more expected, suited and basically in tune with how you might imagine a new Mogwai record to sound"; post-rock has had a strong association with zombie films since music by Godspeed You! Black Emperor featured in 28 Days Later. Though characterised as about zombies, Les Revenants, broadcast in the UK as The Returned, features the dead coming back to life and returning to the town in which they once lived, seemingly as they were, and not as archetypal zombies.

Mogwai were contacted by the television show's producers and asked to start writing music before filming had begun. Band-member John Cummings said that

We didn't know what the overall tone was going to be like - we'd seen the first couple of scripts in English, but the rest of them weren't translated and we hadn't seen any footage, so it was a bit stab in the dark, but they seem to have a decent view of the things they wanted, so from the things we sent they were choosing different ones.

The band later clarified the order of events in an interview published in Fact magazine. Initially, Mogwai were asked to produce music for the programme after hearing a synopsis. They responded by sending producers some demos which they had written and recorded before receiving the request, and so without any specific tailoring to the series. After the television producers responded positively, Mogwai began to produce music specifically themed around the programme before they had seen any footage. Meanwhile, the demos sent to the producers were played during filming, resulting in the producers, according to Mogwai, understanding the music "as being a character within the film as much as the people involved". This led to what the band called an "active soundtrack".

Mogwai focussed on aligning their music with the atmosphere of the series. They aimed to "[b]e Mogwai, but work within this ‘horror ballpark’." Producers stayed in contact with the band who gradually received more and more material to work with. The band explained:

We got the script, then photographs of where they were going to film, then photos of the actors. Once it all started to add together in our minds, they started to say, “Okay, we’re filming now. This song has to be this long to fit with this particular scene”, “We need more music in order for this scene to be fully realised”, and so on.

The final music for the series was recorded in two separate sessions; one for the first four episodes, and one for the second four. The band deliberately tried to avoid creating a "typical" soundtrack. They sought a "calmly unsettling" feel, but chose to avoid rock music, despite knowing that the show would include some action scenes. Mogwai noted that "we were given such room to experiment that it didn’t feel like us working on someone else’s project". Despite this, there was some conflict when producers sought "bombastic and crashing" music, which the band felt was not ideal. For some sections where such music was required, the show's producers therefore used an older Mogwai track "We're No Here". The band greatly enjoyed working on the project, and agreed to score the second series of the programme.

== Release ==
From the beginning of production, Mogwai intended to release what they had produced as an album. The band released a 4-track extended play of the soundtrack, Les Revenants EP, in December 2012. Initially available digitally, a limited-edition 10 inch vinyl was released the following January through Rock Action Records. The digital release date was to coincide with the final episodes of Les Revenants airing on French television channel Canal+, and the limited edition vinyl version had sold out by the time of the full album's release.

Les Revenants was released on 25 February 2013, via Rock Action Records in the United Kingdom and Sub Pop in the United States. It was available for download, on CD and as an LP. Reviewers noted that the album contained more music than was used in the series, including a cover of Washington Phillips's "What Are They Doing In Heaven Today", the only track with vocals. In fact, the music was mostly re-recorded for the album release, meaning that little of the music on the album was actually used in the television series.

== Reception ==
Professional ratings
Aggregate scores
Source	Rating
Metacritic	77/100
Review scores
Source	Rating
AllMusic	4.5/5 stars
Pitchfork Media	(7.6/10)
The Independent	3/5 stars
The Independent	4/5 stars
The Observer	4/5 stars
The Guardian	4/5 stars

Writing for AllMusic, Heather Phares said that Les Revenants defied expectations "with an intimate, low-key brilliance". She noted that the music on the album differed from previous work by Mogwai, claiming that even the most dramatic tracks did not "explode" in the way that elements of Hardcore Will Never Die, But You Will did. Andy Gill, reviewing the album for The Independent, also felt that the music was more subdued than Mogwai's typical productions; something caused by restrictions of the genre which "work to [the group's] advantage".

Phares described the mood of the album by saying that it "is a true score in that it rarely draws attention to itself unnecessarily, and these cues evoke moods rather than forcing them". Laura Snapes, writing for Pitchfork Media, felt the music was more "unsettling" than dramatic or horrific, and so reflected the mood of the show. However, she said that a listener would not need to have seen the show in order to appreciate the music. This sentiment was echoed by Ally Carnwath, who reviewed the album for The Observer. Carnwath described the mood of the album as shifting between "sadness and unease", but felt that there "is warmth too". Simon Price, also writing in The Independent, though less impressed by the album than other reviewers, also felt that the album successfully "augment[s] the atmosphere of melancholy, contemplation and unease" of the show.

== Track listing ==
All songs were written by Mogwai, with the exception of "What Are They Doing in Heaven Today?"

1. "Hungry Face" - 2:25
2. "Jaguar" - 2:19
3. "The Huts" - 4:02
4. "Kill Jester" - 3:30
5. "This Messiah Needs Watching" - 4:37
6. "Whisky Time" - 1:40
7. "Special N" - 3:49
8. "Relative Hysteria" - 3:41
9. "Fridge Magic" - 3:23
10. "Portugal" - 2:49
11. "Eagle Tax" - 3:22
12. "Modern" - 2:49
13. "What Are They Doing in Heaven Today?" - 5:52 (cover of a song by Washington Phillips, written by Charles Albert Tindley)
14. "Wizard Motor" - 04:47

== Personnel ==
Credits, according to AllMusic:

- Frank Arkwright – mastering
- Tony Doogan – mixing
- Niall McMenamin – engineering, production
- Mogwai – composition, primary artist, production
- Washington Phillips – inspiration
