= Travels in Constants, Vol. 12 =

EP by Mogwai
- Released: 18 March 2001
- Recorded: Sub Station Studio; Cowdenbeath, Scotland
- Genre: Instrumental rock
- Length: 13:12
- Label: Temporary Residence Limited
- Producer: Michael Brennan Jr., Kevin Lynch

Mogwai chronology
EP+6 (2000)	Travels in Constants, Vol. 12 (2001)	Rock Action (2001)

Travels in Constants chronology
Travels in Constants, Vol. 11 (2001)	Travels in Constants, Vol. 12 (2001)	Travels in Constants, Vol. 13 (2001)

Travels in Constants, Vol. 12 is an EP by the Scottish group Mogwai, and is part of Temporary Residence Limited's mail-order Travels in Constants series. It was released in 2001, through Temporary Residence Limited. The EP was included in its entirety on the 2014 reissue of Come On Die Young.

== Overview ==
Travels in Constants, Vol. 12 features three songs, "Untitled", "Quiet Stereo Dee" (an alternate version of "Stereodee" from 4 Satin, the 1997 EP), and "Arundel" (a cover of a Papa M song from the 1999 album, Live from a Shark Cage), all recorded at Sub Station Studio in Cowdenbeath, Scotland in 1999, and produced by Michael Brennan Jr. and Kevin Lynch.

== Cover art ==
The album cover features a still of Stevie Chalmers scoring the winning goal for Celtic F.C. in the 1967 European Cup Final against Internazionale.

== Track listing ==
All songs were written by Mogwai, except "Arundel", written by Papa M.

1. "Untitled" – 6:07
2. "Quiet Stereo Dee" – 4:06
3. "Arundel" – 2:59

== Personnel ==
- Stuart Braithwaite (listed as Holy Stuarto in liner notes) – guitar, keyboard
- Dominic Aitchison (listed as Bearded Monsignor in liner notes) – bass guitar
- John Cummings (listed as John of Arc in liner notes) – guitar
- Barry Burns (listed as St. Francis of Assassin in the liner notes) – guitar, piano, flute
- Martin Bulloch (listed as Pious Bionicus in the liner notes) – drums
- Michael Brennan Jr. – producer
- Kevin Lynch – producer

== Release history ==
Travels in Constants, Vol. 12 was made available through Mail order in 2001.

Region	Date	Label	Format	Catalog
United States	18 March 2001	Temporary Residence Limited	CD	TRR13/TIC12
