= Ithica 27 Φ 9 =

Single by Mogwai
- A-side: "Summer"
- Released: 4 November 1996
- Recorded: MCM Studios; Hamilton, Scotland
- Genre: Post-rock
- Length: 2:57
- Label: Love Train
- Songwriters: Stuart Braithwaite, Dominic Aitchison
- Producer: Paul Savage

Mogwai singles chronology
"Angels vs Aliens" (1996)	"Summer" / "Ithica 27 Φ 9" (1996)	"New Paths to Helicon, Pt. 1" / "New Paths to Helicon, Pt. 2" (1997)

"Ithica 27 Φ 9" is a song by Scottish post-rock band Mogwai.

"Ithica 27 Φ 9" was originally released as a double A-side single with "Summer" on 4 November 1996 through Love Train. It was later included on the 1997 compilation album, Ten Rapid (Collected Recordings 1996-1997).

The song is also as referred to as "Ithica 27ø9", "Ithica 27-9" and "Ithica 27 Phi 9".

== Musical composition ==
The guitars in the song are tuned to (C♯ A E G♯ G♯ G♯). The song begins with a repeated note played by guitar, until (0:13), when a soft riff based on the G♯ minor chord is played. At (0:38), more guitars and a drumbeat enter, and an alternate melody is played. At (1:01), the main melody is played again then at (1:25), the drumbeat and guitars get steadily heavier and faster, until at (1:47), a wall of distorted guitar noise explodes. This continues to (2:19), when the main riff is again played, until (2:40), when the guitar fades into silence.

== Release and reception ==
The song was first released as a 7" single, limited to 1500 copies through Love Train on November 4, 1996. The artwork featured on the sleeve of the 7" is by Neale Smith.

All music is composed by Mogwai, except where noted.

7" (PUBE014)
No.	Title	Music	Length
1.	"Summer"	Mogwai; David Robertson	4:25
2.	"Ithica 27Φ9"		2:57
Total length:			7:22

== Personnel and credits ==
Mogwai

- Dominic Aitchison – bass guitar
- Stuart Braithwaite – guitar
- Martin Bulloch – drum kit
- John Cummings – guitar

Production

- Paul Savage – production, mixing
- Neale Smith – artwork
