= Music Industry 3. Fitness Industry 1. =

EP by Mogwai
- Released: 1 December 2014
- Recorded: Castle of Doom Studios, Glasgow, Scotland
- Genre: Post-rock
- Length: 31:39
- Label: Rock Action Records, Sub Pop
- Producer: Paul Savage

Mogwai chronology
Rave Tapes (2014)	Music Industry 3. Fitness Industry 1. (2014)	Central Belters (2015)

Professional ratings
Aggregate scores
Source	Rating
Metacritic	68/100
Review scores
Source	Rating
AllMusic	3.5/5 stars
Drowned in Sound	6/10
The Line of Best Fit	7.5/10 stars
NME	6/10
Pitchfork Media	6.8/10
The Skinny	4/5 stars

Music Industry 3. Fitness Industry 1. is the twelfth EP by Scottish post-rock band Mogwai. It was released on 1 December 2014 through Rock Action Records and Sub Pop. It consists of three original tracks recorded during the sessions that produced the band's album Rave Tapes and three tracks from that album, remixed by different artists.

== Track listing ==
12", CD and download
No.	Title	Length
1.	"Teenage Exorcists"	3:29
2.	"History Day"	5:48
3.	"HMP Shaun William Ryder"	5:29
4.	"Re-Remurdered (Blanck Mass remix)"	5:03
5.	"No Medicine For Regret (Pye Corner Audio remix)"	7:13
6.	"The Lord Is Out Of Control (Nils Frahm remix)"	4:54

== Performers ==
- Stuart Braithwaite – guitar, vocals
- Dominic Aitchison – bass
- Martin Bulloch – drums
- John Cummings – piano, guitar
- Barry Burns – keyboards
- Luke Sutherland – violin, strings, guitar, percussion
