= New Paths to Helicon, Pt. 2 =

Single by Mogwai

from the album Ten Rapid (Collected Recordings 1996-1997)
- A-side: "New Paths to Helicon, Pt. 1"
- Released: February 1997 (UK)
- Recorded: MCM Studios; Hamilton, Scotland
- Genre: Post-rock
- Length: 2:51
- Label: Wurlitzer Jukebox; WJ 22 (UK, 7")
- Producer: Andy Miller

Mogwai singles chronology
"Summer" / "Ithica 27ø9" (1996)	"New Paths to Helicon, Pt. 1" / "New Paths to Helicon, Pt. 2" (1997)	"Club Beatroot, Part 4" (1997)

Ten Rapid (Collected Recordings 1996-1997) track listing
- 1. "Summer"; 2. "New Paths to Helicon, Pt. 2"; 3. "Angels vs. Aliens"; 4. "I Am Not Batman"; 5. "Tuner"; 6. "Ithica 27ø9" 7. "A Place for Parks"; 8. "New Paths to Helicon, Pt. 1"; 9. "End"

Government Commissions: BBC Sessions 1996-2003 track listing
- 1. "Hunted by a Freak"; 2. "R U Still in 2 It"; 3. "New Paths to Helicon Pt II"; 4. "Kappa"; 5. "Cody"; 6. "Like Herod"; 7. "Secret Pint"; 8. "Superheroes of BMX"; 9. "New Paths to Helicon Pt I"; 10. "Stop Coming to My House"

"New Paths to Helicon, Pt. 2" (almost always referred to as "Helicon 2") is a song by Scottish band Mogwai. It was first released as a double A-side with "New Paths to Helicon, Pt. 1", on 7" limited to 3000 copies. It was later included on the 1997 compilation album, Ten Rapid (Collected Recordings 1996-1997). The single reached #2 in English radio presenter John Peel's 1997 Festive Fifty Chart.

== Overview ==
A live version of "Helicon 2" (recorded live by John Peel from a BBC Radio Session at Maida Vale on 20 January 1998) can be found on Mogwai's 2005 live compilation album, Government Commissions: BBC Sessions 1996-2003. The last track on Ten Rapid, "End", is simply "Helicon 2" played backwards. "Helicon 2" was featured on the Scottish Association for Mental Health's 2004 compilation album, One-In-Four.

== Musical composition ==
The track begins immediately with a quiet guitar melody, and soft drums which are repeated along with bass and guitar doubling them. At (0:34), the guitar goes on to play a lead part, while the other guitar plays soft harmonics. At (1:08), they slide back into the main riff. At (1:42), a stronger, more distinctive lead part is played. This continues until (2:16), when the main riff is repeated for the last time. At (2:32), the song ends abruptly.

== Personnel ==
- Stuart Braithwaite – guitar
- Dominic Aitchison – bass guitar
- John Cummings – guitar
- Martin Bulloch – drums
- Andy Miller – producer, mixer
