= EP+6 =

Compilation album by Mogwai
- Released: 23 August 2000
- Recorded: Chem19, Hamilton, Scotland, Chamber Studios, Edinburgh, Scotland, Sub Station Studio, Cowdenbeath, Scotland, Cava Studios, Glasgow, Scotland
- Genre: Post-rock, instrumental rock
- Length: 72:05
- Label: Toy's Factory, Chemikal Underground
- Producer: Andy Miller, Jamie Harley, Paul Savage, Michael Brennan Jr.

Mogwai chronology
EP (1999)	EP+6 (2000)	Travels in Constants, Vol. 12 (2001)

Professional ratings
Review scores
Source	Rating
Rock Sound	4.5/5 stars

EP+6 is a compilation album by Scottish post-rock group Mogwai, released in Japan in 2000 through Toy's Factory, and later in the UK in 2001 through Chemikal Underground.

== Overview ==
EP+6 brings together all three of Mogwai's previous EPs: 1997's 4 Satin, 1998's No Education = No Future (Fuck the Curfew), and 1999's EP, in a Remastered and Enhanced CD, featuring the music video for "Stanley Kubrick". The Japanese version also included a music video for "Xmas Steps", whilst the UK version included a Screensaver, images of Mogwai, and reviews. The cover of EP+6 is similar to the cover of EP, as they both feature the same image, a movie still entitled "Watertower" by Scottish photographer Neale Smith, of a water tower in East Kilbride, South Lanarkshire, Scotland.

== Track listing ==
All songs were written by Mogwai, except "Now You're Taken", lyrics and vocals by Aidan Moffat; Barry Burns was not in Mogwai for tracks 1–6.

1. "Superheroes of BMX" – 8:05
2. "Now You're Taken" – 7:00
3. "Stereodee" – 13:39
4. "Xmas Steps" – 11:13
5. "Rollerball" – 3:47
6. "Small Children in the Background" – 6:51
7. "Stanley Kubrick" – 4:19
8. "Christmas Song" – 3:26
9. "Burn Girl Prom Queen" – 8:33
10. "Rage:Man" – 5:05

== Personnel ==
- Stuart Braithwaite – guitar, keyboard, percussion
- Dominic Aitchison – bass guitar, guitar
- Martin Bulloch – drums
- John Cummings – guitar, piano
- Barry Burns – guitar, keyboard
- Aidan Moffat – vocals on "Now You're Taken"
- Luke Sutherland – violin on "Xmas Steps"
- Lee Cohen – vocals on "Stanley Kubrick"
- The Cowdenbeath Brass Band – brass on "Burn Girl Prom Queen"
- Andy Miller – producer on tracks 1, 6
- Jamie Harley – producer on "Now You're Taken"
- Paul Savage – producer on "Stereodee"
- Geoff Allan – producer on tracks 4–5
- Michael Brennan Jr. – producer on tracks 7–10
- Kevin Lynch – assistant producer on "Stanley Kubrick"
- Tony Doogan – assistant producer on tracks 8–10
- Willie Deans – assistant producer on tracks 8–10

== Release history ==
EP+6 was originally released in Japan in 2000.

Country	Release date	Record label	Catalogue number	Format
Japan	23 August 2000	Toy's Factory	TFCK-87224	Enhanced CD
United Kingdom	17 September 2001	Chemikal Underground	CHEM056CD	Enhanced CD
