= The Magnificents (album) =

Studio album by The Magnificents
- Released: February 2004
- Recorded: M-Bunker, Edinburgh and The Diving Bell Lounge, Glasgow.
- Genre: Electro, Punk, Alternative.
- Length: 43:12
- Label: KFM Records.
- Producer: Marcus MacKay and The Magnificents.

The Magnificents chronology
The Magnificents (2004)	Year Of Explorers (2007)

Professional ratings
Review scores
Source	Rating
Allmusic	link
NME	(8/10) 7th Feb 2004. (pg.55)
Stylus Magazine	(B+) link
The Scotsman	link

The Magnificents is the debut album by the Scottish electro rock band The Magnificents.

== Track listing ==
All tracks written by The Magnificents.

1. "Infidel Infidel (Six Fingered Hell)" – 2:29
2. "Last Gasp Of Revenge" – 4:06
3. "The Apollo Creed" – 3:16
4. "Blueprint" – 2:33
5. "Kids Now" – 2:30
6. "Digital Dirt" – 4:57
7. "M.I.A." – 4:02
8. "This Is Active" – 2:49
9. "Russian Disco" – 5:58
10. "Ex-Airport" – 3:28
11. "This Is The Magnificents" – 6:53

== Production ==
The tracks Kids Now and Digital Dirt were taken from the previously released Kids Now EP (2001) and 4 Claws Of The Underground EP (2003) respectively. The remainder of the album was recorded at The Diving Bell Lounge Studio in Glasgow.
