= Ten Rapid (Collected Recordings 1996–1997) =

Compilation album by Mogwai
- Released: 17 April 1997
- Recorded: 1996–1997 MCM Studios, Hamilton, Scotland
- Genre: Post-rock
- Length: 33:18
- Label: Rock Action, Jetset
- Producer: Paul Savage, Andy Miller

Mogwai chronology
Ten Rapid (Collected Recordings 1996–1997) (1997)	4 Satin (1997)

Professional ratings
Review scores
Source	Rating
Allmusic	link
Prefix Magazine	8.0/10 2000
NME	7/10

Ten Rapid (Collected Recordings 1996–1997) is a compilation album by Scottish post-rock group Mogwai, released in various countries in 1997.

== Background ==
Ten Rapid brings together various songs recorded by Mogwai and released between 1996 and 1997. "Tuner" is a rerecorded version of the band's March 1996 debut double A-sided single (from which "Lower" does not appear), released on Rock Action. "Angels versus Aliens" is a rerecorded version of the July 1996 split single with Dweeb, released on Ché Trading.

"A Place for Parks" was given away free to attendees of the Camden Crawl II show in Camden Town on 19 September 1996, on a compilation CD entitled The Camden Crawl II, released on Love Train. "I Am Not Batman" was given away free to attendees of the Ten Day Weekend Festival in Glasgow in October 1996, on a compilation cassette entitled Hoover Your Head: Ten Day Weekend, released on Sano Music. "Summer" and "Ithica 27 Φ 9" were released as a double A-sided single in November 1996 on Love Train. "Helicon 1" and "Helicon 2" were released as a double A-sided single in February 1997 on Wurlitzer Jukebox. "End" is "Helicon 2", played backwards. The cover art of Ten Rapid was designed by Victoria Braithwaite. The CD artwork depicts portions of the McMinnville UFO photographs.

== Track listing ==
All songs were written by Mogwai.

1. "Summer" – 4:25
2. "Helicon 2" – 2:51
3. "Angels versus Aliens" – 5:37
4. "I Am Not Batman" – 3:32
5. "Tuner" – 2:57
6. "Ithica 27 Φ 9" – 2:57
7. "A Place for Parks" – 2:14
8. "Helicon 1" – 6:00
9. "End" – 2:44

== Personnel ==
- Stuart Braithwaite – guitar, keyboard, vocals, percussion
- Dominic Aitchison – bass guitar, guitar
- Martin Bulloch – drums
- John Cummings – guitar
- Paul Savage – producer on tracks 1, 3–7
- Andy Miller – producer tracks 2, 8–9

== Release history ==
Ten Rapid was originally released in various countries in 1997.

Region	Date	Label	Format	Catalog
United Kingdom	April 17, 1997	Rock Action	CD	ROCKACT05CD
United States	April 17, 1997	Jetset	CD	TWA05CD
United States	April 17, 1997	Jetset	12"	TWA05
Norway	1997	Voices of Wonder	CD	VOW062CD
Australia	2002	Spunk	CD	URA076
United States	2004	Jetset	2x10"	TWA05LP
United Kingdom	October 11, 2019	Rock Action	LP	ROCKACT05LPX
