= Travel Is Dangerous =

EP by Mogwai
- Released: 26 June 2006
- Recorded: 2005–2006
- Genre: Post-rock
- Length: 33:13
- Label: Play It Again Sam
- Producer: Tony Doogan

Mogwai chronology
Mr Beast (2006)	Travel Is Dangerous (2006)	Batcat (2008)

Travel Is Dangerous is an EP by Glaswegian post-rock band Mogwai. The dog on the cover of the EP is called Princess, and belongs to Stuart Braithwaite and his wife, Grainne.

The song "Travel Is Dangerous" is one of the few Mogwai songs to have lyrics, and also appears as track #4 on their 2006 album Mr Beast. It is speculated that this song is about the sinking of the Russian submarine K-141 Kursk in the Barents Sea on August 12, 2000.

It was rated four stars by The Skinny.

== Track listing ==
1. "Travel Is Dangerous" – 4:03
2. "Auto Rock" (Errors remix) – 4:05
3. "Friend of the Night" (Acid Casuals remix) – 5:53
4. "Like Herod" (Recorded live at Unit, Tokyo, Japan, 25 January 2006) – 12:30
5. "We're No Here" (Recorded live at Unit, Tokyo, Japan, 24 January 2006) – 6:42

Tracks 4 and 5 were mixed by John Cummings.
