= Friend of the Night =

2006 single by Mogwai

Single by Mogwai

from the album Mr Beast
- Released: 30 January 2006
- Studio: Castle of Doom, Glasgow, Scotland
- Genre: Post-rock
- Length: 5:28
- Label: Play It Again Sam
- Songwriter: Francis Barry Burns
- Producers: Tony Doogan, John Cummings

Mogwai singles chronology
"My Father My King" (2001)	"Friend of the Night" (2006)	"Travel Is Dangerous"

"Friend of the Night" is a song by Glaswegian post-rock band, Mogwai from their 2006 album, Mr Beast. It was released as a single on 30 January 2006, and became the first Mogwai single to reach the UK top 40 singles chart, peaking at #38.

== Track listing ==
All tracks were written by Mogwai.

1. "Friend of the Night" – 5:28
2. "Fresh Crown" – 4:42
3. "1% of Monster" – 3:46

Tracks one and three were mixed by Tony Doogan, while track two was mixed and produced by John Cummings.

== Charts ==
Chart performance for Friend of the Night
Chart (2006)	Peak position
UK Singles (OCC)	38
UK Indie (OCC)	5
