= 4 Satin =

- Cover to the standard edition of the album

EP by Mogwai
- Released: 26 May 1997
- Studios: MCM Studios, Hamilton, Scotland, Chamber Studios, Edinburgh, Scotland
- Genres: Post-rock, instrumental rock
- Length: 28:40
- Labels: Chemikal Underground, Jetset
- Producers: Andy Miller, Jamie Harley, Paul Savage

Mogwai chronology
| Ten Rapid (Collected Recordings 1996–1997) (1997) | 4 Satin (1997) | Mogwai Young Team (1997) |

Alternative cover
- Cover art of 12" vinyl

Professional ratings
Review scores
| Source | Rating |
|---|---|
| AllMusic | 4/5 stars |
| Almost Cool | (5.5/10) |

4 Satin is the debut EP by Scottish post-rock group Mogwai, released in 1997 in the UK and in 1998 in the US through Chemikal Underground and Jetset respectively.

== Overview ==
All three of the EP's tracks—"Superheroes of BMX" (recorded at MCM Studios in Hamilton, Scotland, and produced by Andy Miller), "Now You're Taken" (recorded at Chamber Studio in Edinburgh, Scotland, produced by Jamie Harley, and featuring vocals by Aidan Moffat), and "Stereodee" (also recorded at MCM Studios, but produced by Paul Savage)—later appeared on the 2000 compilation album, EP+6. A US mispress of 4 Satin was released, where the wrong master tape was used. It features an alternative mix of "Stereodee", and otherwise-unavailable track "Guardians of Space". The track listing on the sleeve was also incorrect, although later pressings were corrected.

== Track listing ==
All songs were written by Mogwai, except "Now You're Taken", lyrics and vocals by Aidan Moffat.

1. "Superheroes of BMX" – 8:05
2. "Now You're Taken" – 7:00
3. "Stereodee" – 13:39

== Mispress track listing ==
1. "Guardians Of Space" – 3:34
2. "Now You're Taken" – 6:57
3. "Superheroes of BMX" – 8:04
4. "Stereodee" – 10:33

== Personnel ==
- Stuart Braithwaite – guitar, keyboard, percussion
- Dominic Aitchison – bass guitar, guitar
- Martin Bulloch – drums
- John Cummings – guitar, piano
- Aidan Moffat – vocals on "Now You're Taken"
- Andy Miller – producer on "Superheroes of BMX"
- Jamie Harley – producer on "Now You're Taken"
- Paul Savage – producer on "Stereodee"

== Release history ==
| Region | Date | Label | Format | Catalog |
|---|---|---|---|---|
| United Kingdom | 26 May 1997 | Chemikal Underground | CD | CHEM015CD |
| United Kingdom | 26 May 1997 | Chemikal Underground | 12" | CHEM015 |
| United States | 18 August 1998 | Jetset | CD | TWA14CD |
