= Rave Tapes =

Studio album by Mogwai
- Released: 20 January 2014
- Recorded: 2013
- Studios: Castle of Doom (Glasgow, Scotland)
- Genres: Post-rock; electronic
- Length: 49:03
- Label: Rock Action
- Producer: Paul Savage

Mogwai chronology
Les Revenants (2013)	Rave Tapes (2014)	Music Industry 3. Fitness Industry 1. (2014)

Rave Tapes is the eighth studio album by Scottish post-rock band Mogwai, released on 20 January 2014 on Rock Action Records in the UK, and the following day in the USA on Sub Pop. The album was released on vinyl, MC, CD, high resolution digital download and as part of a limited edition box set. In the first week of release the album charted at number 10 in the UK Album Charts and number 2 in the Scottish Album Charts. An EP of unreleased tracks from the Rave Tapes sessions along with remixes of three tracks was released on 1 December 2014 on Rock Action titled Music Industry 3. Fitness Industry 1..

It is the final Mogwai album to feature guitarist John Cummings, who left the band in 2015.

== Overview ==
On 5 August 2013 the band posted an image to Instagram with the caption "1st day in Castle of Doom recording our new album." On 28 October 2013 the track "Remurdered" was premiered on BBC Radio 6 Music and SoundCloud, and the track listing released. The band debuted six tracks from the album ("Heard About You Last Night", "Master Card", "Blues Hour", "The Lord is Out of Control", "Hexon Bogon" and "Remurdered") during a concert at Cambridge Junction on 28 November, a warm up for their appearance at the final ATP festival. Five days later, an official video for "The Lord is Out of Control" was posted on YouTube.

== Critical reception ==
Professional ratings
Aggregate scores
Source	Rating
Metacritic	76/100
Review scores
Source	Rating
AllMusic	3.5/5 stars
Alternative Press	4/5 stars
Consequence of Sound	C+
Crackle Feedback	8/10
Exclaim!	9/10
MusicOMH	4.5/5 stars
Paste	8/10
Pitchfork	(6.0/10)
No Ripcord	8/10
Rolling Stone	3.5/5 stars
This Is Fake DIY	4/5 stars

At Alternative Press, Robert Ham rated the album four stars out of five, and wrote that the musical sound was softening, while the band "are aging gracefully and brilliantly." Joe Gross of Rolling Stone rated the album three-and-a-half out of five stars, and noted that "Many were born to rock; Mogwai were born to score." Consequence of Sound called the band to likely "stand as the genre’s last immobile pillar" and listed "Remurdered" and "The Lord Is Out of Control" as essential tracks. Buzz & Howl wrote that Rave Tapes "isn’t so much a feverishly urgent collection as it is a contented, worthwhile keepsake" and noted that "krautrock subtly informs much of this album."

== Track listing ==
All songs by Mogwai.

No.	Title	Length
1.	"Heard About You Last Night"	5:22
2.	"Simon Ferocious"	4:48
3.	"Remurdered"	6:25
4.	"Hexon Bogon"	2:35
5.	"Repelish"	3:56
6.	"Master Card"	3:57
7.	"Deesh"	5:33
8.	"Blues Hour"	6:17
9.	"No Medicine for Regret"	5:39
10.	"The Lord Is Out of Control"	4:21
Total length:		49:03

Box Set Bonus Tracks

A "Box Set" version of the album included three bonus tracks:

No.	Title	Length
11.	"Bad Magician 3"	3:32
12.	"Die 1 Dislike!"	5:26
13.	"Tell Everybody That I Love Them"	4:38

== Credits ==
- Mogwai: Dominic Aitchison, Stuart Braithwaite, Martin Bulloch, Barry Burns, John Cummings
- Published by Tomorrow Hits / Kobalt Music Publishing
- Produced, recorded and mixed by Paul Savage at Castle of Doom, Glasgow, Scotland
- Assistant: Niall McMenamin
- Voice on "Repelish" by Reverend Lee Cohen
- Mastered by Frank Arkwright at Abbey Road
- Artwork by DLT

== Charts ==
Chart (2014)	Peak position
Austrian Albums (Ö3 Austria)	56
Belgian Albums (Ultratop Flanders)	12
Belgian Albums (Ultratop Wallonia)	30
Dutch Albums (Album Top 100)	78
French Albums (SNEP)	37
German Albums (Offizielle Top 100)	16
Italian Albums (FIMI)	50
Scottish Albums (Official Charts)	2
Swiss Albums (Schweizer Hitparade)	24
UK Albums (Official Charts)	10
UK Album Downloads (Official Charts)	24
UK Independent Albums (Official Charts)	3
UK Progressive Albums (Official Charts)	26
US Billboard 200	55
US Independent Albums (Billboard)	13
US Vinyl Albums (Billboard)	2
US Top Alternative Albums (Billboard)	12
US Top Rock Albums (Billboard)	19
