= Les Revenants EP =

EP by Mogwai
- Released: 17 December 2012
- Genre: Post-rock
- Label: Rock Action
- Producer: Mogwai

Mogwai chronology
A Wrenched Virile Lore (2012)	Les Revenants EP (2012)	Les Revenants (2013)

Les Revenants EP is the eleventh EP by Scottish post-rock band Mogwai. It was released on 17 December 2012 in a digital format through Rock Action Records, and was released physically in 10" vinyl format on 28 January 2013. The EP contains three tracks from the full-length soundtrack album of the same name (two of these are alternative versions), plus a bonus track ("Soup").

== Track listing ==
1. "Wizard Motor" - 4:47
2. "Soup" - 1:16
3. "The Huts" (version) - 3:29
4. "This Messiah Needs Watching" (version) - 3:14

== Personnel ==
- Stuart Braithwaite – guitar, vocals
- Dominic Aitchison – bass
- Martin Bulloch – drums
- John Cummings – piano, guitar
- Barry Burns – keyboards
