= EP (Mogwai EP) =

EP by Mogwai
- Released: 18 October 1999
- Studio: Sub Station Studio, Cowdenbeath, Scotland, CaVa Studios, Glasgow, Scotland
- Genre: Post-rock, instrumental rock
- Length: 21:11
- Label: Chemikal Underground, Matador, Spunk
- Producer: Michael Brennan Jr.

Mogwai chronology
Come On Die Young (1999)	EP (1999)	EP+6 (2000)

Professional ratings
Review scores
Source	Rating
Allmusic	4/5 stars
Almost Cool	(8/10)
Kerrang!	5/5 stars
Pitchfork Media	(8.3/10)

EP is an EP by Scottish post-rock group Mogwai, released in various countries in 1999.

== Overview ==
The EP features four tracks, "Stanley Kubrick" (recorded at Sub Station Studio in Cowdenbeath, Scotland and produced by Michael Brennan Jr., assisted by Kevin Lynch), "Christmas Song", "Burn Girl Prom Queen", and "Rage:Man" (all recorded at CaVa Studios in Glasgow, Scotland, and also produced by Michael Brennan Jr., assisted by Tony Doogan and Willie Deans). The US release of EP is titled EP+2, due to the two bonus tracks, "Rollerball", and "Small Children in the Background", both from No Education = No Future (Fuck the Curfew), which was not released in the US. All four tracks on EP were later included on the 2000 compilation album, EP+6. The cover of EP is similar to the cover of EP+6, as they both feature the same image, a movie still entitled "Watertower" by Scottish photographer Neale Smith, of a Water tower in East Kilbride, South Lanarkshire, Scotland. Stuart Braithwaite has commented on EP, saying:

We did these four songs over a week this summer. "Stanley Kubrick" started as an idea of John's that we started while doing the remix for Warp up in Cowdenbeath. We decided that since we'd done a pretty decent one, we wrote three more so as to make it an EP.

== Track listing ==
All songs and music were written by Mogwai.

1. "Stanley Kubrick" – 4:17
2. "Christmas Song" – 3:24
3. "Burn Girl Prom Queen" – 8:31
4. "Rage:Man" – 5:03

== Personnel ==
- Stuart Braithwaite – guitar
- Dominic Aitchison – bass guitar
- Martin Bulloch – drums
- John Cummings – guitar, piano
- Barry Burns – guitar, keyboard
- Lee Cohen – vocals on "Stanley Kubrick"
- John Todd – brass on "Burn Girl Prom Queen"
- Michael Brennan Jr. – producer
- Kevin Lynch – assistant producer on "Stanley Kubrick"
- Tony Doogan – assistant producer on tracks 2–4
- Willie Deans – assistant producer on tracks 2–4

== Release history ==
EP was released in various countries in 1999.

Region	Date	Label	Format	Catalog
United Kingdom	18 October 1999	Chemikal Underground	Promo CD	PCHEM036CD
United Kingdom	18 October 1999	Chemikal Underground	CD	CHEM036CD
United Kingdom	18 October 1999	Chemikal Underground	12"	CHEM036
United States	18 August 1998	Matador	CD	OLE412
Australia, New Zealand	1999	Spunk	CD	URA012
