= Summer (Mogwai composition) =

Single by Mogwai

from the album Ten Rapid (Collected Recordings 1996-1997)
- A-side: "Ithica 27ø9"
- Released: 4 November 1996 (UK)
- Studio: MCM, Hamilton, Scotland
- Genre: Post-rock
- Length: 4:25
- Label: Love Train (UK single)
- Songwriters: Dominic Aitchison; Stuart Braithwaite; David Robertson
- Producer: Paul Savage

Mogwai singles chronology
"Angels vs Aliens" (1996)	"Summer" / "Ithica 27ø9" (1996)	"New Paths to Helicon, Pt. 1" / "New Paths to Helicon, Pt. 2" (1997)

"Summer" is a piece of music by Mogwai released as a double A-side with "Ithica 27ø9" on 4 November 1996 and eventually included on Ten Rapid (Collected Recordings 1996-1997). A version of "Summer" called "Summer (Priority Version)" is included on Mogwai's debut album, Young Team.

== Overview ==
"Summer" could be described as Mogwai's equivalent of a pop song. The original version of "Summer" is still played live regularly, whereas the Priority Version, while not usually played live anymore, used to be played live quite commonly in the late 1990s. The piece was originally titled "Martin", most likely after Mogwai drummer Martin Bulloch. "Summer" could possibly be the first Mogwai composition ever written because the 1995 Deadcat Motorbike demos (Stuart Braithwaite's previous band) contain a track labelled "Summer".

== Priority version ==
The version of "Summer" which appeared on the band's 1997 debut album, Mogwai Young Team, entitled "Summer (Priority Version)" was first played live for a Peel session in late 1996. Stuart Braithwaite commented on this version of the piece: "I think that we must have been on crack when we wrote it because it's crap."

== Musical composition ==
The track begins with a quiet recording of the chorus of "Summer", with much reverb. At (0:40), it fades out and the bass riff of "Summer" kicks in, accompanied by an Organ. At (0:54), it is joined by the drums, and a glockenspiel playing the melody. At (1:24), the distorted guitars are brought in, playing a heavily distorted E5 chord along with heavy drumming. At (1:30), the quiet glockenspiel melody returns briefly, before being drowned out at (1:36) by the guitars playing the E5 chord. This is followed at (1:42), by a guitar solo, played by Stuart Braithwaite, with the glockenspiel playing along. At (2:13), there is another heavily distorted guitar section, followed by a brief return to the glockenspiel melody, and then back to the guitar section. At (2:43), a similar guitar solo is played, until (3:00), when all the instruments begin playing frantically and heavily, until (3:28), when another guitar section is played. At (3:45), the glockenspiel melody is played one last time, accompanied by organ and drums, until (4:09), when everything finishes playing, except the organ, which slowly fades out.

== Media appearances ==
- "Summer (Priority Version)" was used as the ending theme of the 2002 documentary television program, RE:Brand.
- "Summer" was also used in a Levi advert during an American football Super Bowl clash in 2003 which earned the band £250,000. This advert also raised their global awareness.

== Personnel ==
- Stuart Braithwaite – guitar, glockenspiel
- Dominic Aitchison – bass guitar
- John Cummings – guitar
- Martin Bulloch – drums
- Paul Savage – producer, mixer
