= New Paths to Helicon, Pt. 1 =

Single by Mogwai

from the album Ten Rapid (Collected Recordings 1996-1997)
- A-side: "New Paths to Helicon, Pt. 2"
- Released: February 1997 (UK)
- Recorded: MCM Studios; Hamilton, Scotland
- Genre: Post-rock, space rock
- Length: 6:00
- Label: Wurlitzer Jukebox; WJ 22 (UK, 7")
- Songwriters: Stuart Braithwaite; Dominic Aitchison
- Producer: Andy Miller

Mogwai singles chronology
| "Summer" / "Ithica 27ø9" (1996) | "New Paths to Helicon, Pt. 1" / "New Paths to Helicon, Pt. 2" (1997) | "Club Beatroot, Part 4" (1997) |

Ten Rapid (Collected Recordings 1996-1997) track listing
- 1. "Summer"; 2. "New Paths to Helicon, Pt. 2"; 3. "Angels vs. Aliens"; 4. "I Am Not Batman"; 5. "Tuner"; 6. "Ithica 27ø9" 7. "A Place for Parks"; 8. "New Paths to Helicon, Pt. 1"; 9. "End"

Government Commissions: BBC Sessions 1996-2003 track listing
- 1. "Hunted by a Freak"; 2. "R U Still in 2 It"; 3. "New Paths to Helicon Pt II"; 4. "Kappa"; 5. "Cody"; 6. "Like Herod"; 7. "Secret Pint"; 8. "Superheroes of BMX"; 9. "New Paths to Helicon Pt I"; 10. "Stop Coming to My House"

"New Paths to Helicon, Pt. 1" (almost always referred to as "Helicon 1") is a song by Scottish band Mogwai. It was first released as a double A-side with "New Paths to Helicon, Pt. 2" on 7" limited to 3,000 copies. It was later included on the 1997 compilation album, Ten Rapid (Collected Recordings 1996-1997). The single reached #2 in English radio presenter John Peel's Festive Fifty Chart in 1997. The single's cover art shows details from the McMinnville UFO photographs.

== Overview ==
"Helicon 1" is a regular part of Mogwai set lists. A live version of the song (recorded by Steve Lamacq from a BBC Radio Session at Maida Vale in March 1999) can be found on Mogwai's 2005 live compilation album, Government Commissions: BBC Sessions 1996-2003, as well as UK music magazine Select's 2000 compilation CD, The Deep End. Another live version of "Helicon 1" (recorded at Rothesay Pavilion, Isle of Bute on 14 April 2001) can be found as B-sides on the Australian, New Zealand and Japanese releases of the "My Father My King" single, as well as the 2001 UK/European Tour EP. When the song is played live, Stuart Braithwaite and Dominic Aitchison switch instruments, Aitchison playing guitar, and Braithwaite on bass, usually sitting down. Braithwaite has commented on this:

I'm a lot shorter than Dominic so I can't stand up playing the bass or [it]'d be down on my knees.

== Musical composition ==
The song begins with almost inaudible guitar, heavily delayed and reverberated, playing a descending three note melody. At (0:25), a bass riff (based around the chords of D major and B minor) enters. At (1:00), slightly distorted, heavily delayed and reverberated guitars begin playing along to the bass riff, swooping in and out. At (1:34), a relaxed, slow drum beat begins. At (2:50), all of the instruments pause for a brief second, then explode into loud guitar-driven noise, backed by a steady, heavy drumbeat (to which every snare drum beat is accompanied by a tambourine clash). At (4:28), the distorted guitars and drums end, leaving the soft bass riff to close the song, aided by the guitar melody heard at the start of song, all of which gradually fade out.

Live versions of the song are performed at a substantially slower tempo.

== Media usage ==
- In 2002, the song was featured in "Dragonchasers", an episode of the American crime drama The Shield.
- In 2006, the song was featured in "Wind Sprints", an episode of the American serial drama Friday Night Lights.
- In 2018, the song was featured in the film and trailer for "Beautiful Boy."

== Music video ==
Almost two decades since the single was first released, an official music video was produced for "Helicon 1," directed by Craig Murray. The video premiered on Vice Media's Noisey music channel on June 24, 2015, as an advance promotion for Central Belters, a 3-disc retrospective marking Mogwai's 20th anniversary as a band.

== Personnel ==
- Stuart Braithwaite – bass guitar
- Dominic Aitchison – guitar
- John Cummings – guitar
- Martin Bulloch – drums
- Andy Miller – producer, mixer
