= A Wrenched Virile Lore =

Remix album by Mogwai
- Released: 19 November 2012
- Genres: Post-rock; electronica; ambient
- Length: 65:19
- Labels: Rock Action; Sub Pop

Mogwai chronology
Earth Division (2011)	A Wrenched Virile Lore (2012)	Les Revenants EP (2012)

Professional ratings
Aggregate scores
Source	Rating
Metacritic	62/100
Review scores
Source	Rating
Consequence of Sound	3/5 stars
MusicOMH	3/5 stars
NME	6/10
Pitchfork	7.0/10
The Skinny	4/5 stars
Slant Magazine	3/5 stars
State	6/10

A Wrenched Virile Lore (almost an anagram of the phrase "Hardcore Will Never Die") is a remix album by Scottish post-rock band Mogwai consisting of tracks from their 2011 album Hardcore Will Never Die, But You Will remixed by various artists. It was released on 19 November 2012 by Rock Action Records, apart from the US where it was released on 4 December by Sub Pop. The album was offered in a limited edition of 2500 vinyl albums, and on CD and digital download.

== Reception ==
The general reception was positive. Pitchfork gave the album 7/10, with praising its provision of "new avenues to explore." NME gave the album 6/10 and said "the overall standard is high", whilst musicOMH awarded 3/5, comparing the album to the original as declaring it "an involving and exciting listen in its own right". The Skinny gave the album 4/5, commenting that it had "moments which on occasion eclipse its parent album (which is) no small praise" though some reviews commented that the quality was uneven, such as State which whilst awarding a mark of 6/10 noted that "this is a good listen in its own right, although despite some cracking tracks there are average moments which let it down".

== Track listing ==
All songs written by Mogwai.

1. "George Square Thatcher Death Party" (Justin K. Broadrick Reshape) – 5:07
2. "Rano Pano" (Mogwai Is My Dick RMX by Klad Hest) – 7:21
3. "White Noise" (EVP Mix by Cylob) – 5:13
4. "How to Be a Werewolf" (Xander Harris remix) – 6:52
5. "Letters to the Metro" (Zombi remix) – 7:22
6. "Mexican Grand Prix" (reworked by RM Hubbert) – 4:35
7. "Rano Pano" (Tim Hecker remix) – 4:44
8. "San Pedro" (The Soft Moon remix) – 3:52
9. "Too Raging to Cheers" (Umberto remix) – 6:30
10. "La Mort Blanche" (Robert Hampson remix) – 13:43

"La Mort Blanche" is a remix incorporating two songs, "White Noise" and "Death Rays."

== Personnel ==
Credits adapted from Hardcore Will Never Die, But You Will album liner notes.

Mogwai

- Mogwai – production
- Dominic Aitchison – bass guitar
- Stuart Braithwaite – guitar
- Martin Bulloch – drums
- Barry Burns – guitar, keyboards
- John Cummings – guitar
