= Zidane: A 21st Century Portrait (soundtrack) =

Film score by Mogwai
- Released: 30 October 2006
- Recorded: Castle of Doom Studios, Glasgow, Scotland
- Genres: Post-rock, film score
- Length: 73:58
- Labels: Wall of Sound (UK); Play It Again Sam (international)
- Producer: Tony Doogan

Mogwai chronology
Mr Beast (2006)	Zidane: A 21st Century Portrait (2006)	Batcat (2008)

Professional ratings
Review scores
Source	Rating
AllMusic	3.5/5 stars
Drowned in Sound	(8/10)
musicOMH	4/5 stars
Pitchfork Media	(6.4/10)
Q	2/5 stars
The Sunday Times	4/5 stars
Tiny Mix Tapes	2/5 stars

Zidane: A 21st Century Portrait (subtitled An Original Soundtrack by Mogwai) is a film score by the Scottish post-rock band Mogwai, for the 2006 French documentary film Zidane: A 21st Century Portrait.

== Overview ==
In late 2005, Douglas Gordon asked Mogwai if they would record a score for his documentary, Zidane, un portrait du 21e siècle. After seeing some footage of the film with a remix of "Mogwai Fear Satan" playing in the background, they agreed to do it. The band weren't given any direction as to what the album should sound like and didn't have a lot of time to structure the music, so some songs on the album have an improvised feel. The album's sound is a departure from the more straightforward rock songs on Mr Beast and a return of the slow, experimental style of Come on Die Young. It features darker, slower songs with haunting piano and gentle guitar melodies, as well as ambient noise. There is an untitled hidden track after "Black Spider 2", which lasts for more than 20 minutes. Two of the songs are outtakes from previous Mogwai releases, rerecorded: "Black Spider" (originally titled "Big E") and "7:25" from Rock Action and Come on Die Young, respectively. It is the first Mogwai release to feature a hidden track.

In 2009 it was awarded a gold certification from the Independent Music Companies Association which indicated sales of at least 100,000 copies throughout Europe.

== Track listing ==
All songs were written by Mogwai.

1. "Black Spider" – 5:02
2. "Terrific Speech 2" – 4:06
3. "Wake Up and Go Berserk" – 4:45
4. "Terrific Speech" – 4:45
5. "7:25" – 5:11
6. "Half Time" – 6:49
7. "I Do Have Weapons" – 4:15
8. "Time and a Half" – 5:56
9. "It Would Have Happened Anyway" – 2:34
10. "Black Spider 2" – 4:12
11. "Untitled [Hidden Track]" – 23:02

== Personnel ==
- Stuart Braithwaite – guitar
- Dominic Aitchison – bass guitar
- Martin Bulloch – drums
- John Cummings – guitar
- Barry Burns – piano, guitar, organ
- Tony Doogan – producer

== See also ==
- Zidane: A 21st Century Portrait (film)
