= Zidane: A 21st Century Portrait =

Zidane, Un Portrait Du 21e Siècle
- Directed by: Douglas Gordon; Philippe Parreno
- Starring: Zinedine Zidane
- Cinematography: Darius Khondji
- Music by: Mogwai
- Distributed by: Universal Pictures (through United International Pictures)
- Release date: 2006
- Running time: 91 minutes
- Country: France
- Language: French

Zidane, A 21st Century Portrait (French: Zidane, un portrait du 21e siècle) is a 2006 French documentary film focusing on the playing style of the French football player Zinedine Zidane.

== Overview ==
The film is a documentary focused purely on Zidane during the Spanish La Liga match played between Real Madrid and Villarreal on 23 April 2005 at the Santiago Bernabéu Stadium and was filmed in real time using 17 synchronized cameras. During the last minutes of the match, Zidane was sent off as a result of a brawl.

The film bears a similarity to Football As Never Before (aka "Fußball wie noch nie"), a documentary made in 1970 by acclaimed German filmmaker Hellmuth Costard about Manchester United footballer George Best. In the experimental film Costard used eight 16mm film cameras to follow Best, in real time, for the course of an entire game against Coventry City. These films also inspired Spike Lee's 2009 documentary Kobe Doin' Work.

The film was featured at the 2006 Edinburgh International Film Festival.

== Soundtrack ==
Scottish post-rock band Mogwai provided the soundtrack to the film, at the request of Douglas Gordon. After seeing some footage of the film with a remix of "Mogwai Fear Satan" playing in the background, they agreed to do it.

== See also ==
- List of association football films
