= Castle of Doom Studios =

Recording studio in Glasgow, Scotland

Castle of Doom Studios, created in 2005 by record producer Tony Doogan and Mogwai, is a recording studio in Glasgow, Scotland.

== Overview ==
It has been used by such artists as Mogwai, Malcolm Middleton, The Magnificents, Belle & Sebastian, Dirty Pretty Things, and SLIX. The studios are located on Woodlands Road, in Glasgow. The studios are featured in the documentary film The Recording of Mr. Beast. Barry Burns has commented on the studio:

The Castle of Doom has actually turned out to be a really expensive gang hut. We have very expensive speakers and a broken dishwasher, so the priorities are right.

Stuart Braithwaite has also commented on the studio, saying:

It took a bit of time to set up. As a result, we've discovered we're all useless with a lump hammer.

== Releases recorded in Castle of Doom ==
- Mogwai – Mr Beast
- Mogwai – Zidane: A 21st Century Portrait
- Mogwai – Hardcore Will Never Die But You Will
- Mogwai – Rave Tapes
- Errors – How Clean Is Your Acid House?
- Malcolm Middleton – A Brighter Beat
- The Magnificents – Year of Explorers
- Art-School – Paradise Lost
- The Paddingtons – No Mundane Options
- Must Be Something – "Give Up The Ghost"
- Russian Red - Fuerteventura
- The Fountain soundtrack
- Twilight Sad - Nobody Wants to Be Here and Nobody Wants to Leave
- Mogwai - Atomic
- Anathema - The Optimist (Anathema album)
- Els Amics de les Arts - Un estrany poder
- The Jesus and Mary Chain - Glasgow Eyes
