= Mr Beast (album) =

Studio album by Mogwai
- Released: 6 March 2006
- Recorded: April–October 2005
- Studios: Castle of Doom (Glasgow, Scotland)
- Genres: Post-rock, noise rock, space rock
- Length: 43:07
- Languages: Scottish English (all exc. track 9); Japanese (track 9)
- Labels: Play It Again Sam, Matador
- Producers: Tony Doogan, Mogwai

Mogwai chronology
| Happy Songs for Happy People (2003) | Mr Beast (2006) | Zidane: A 21st Century Portrait (soundtrack) (2006) |

Singles from Mr Beast
- 1. "Friend of the Night" Released: 30 January 2006; 2. "Travel Is Dangerous" Released: 26 June 2006 (EP)

Professional ratings
Aggregate scores
| Source | Rating |
|---|---|
| Metacritic | 74/100 |
Review scores
| Source | Rating |
| AllMusic | 4/5 stars |
| The Guardian | 4/5 stars |
| Kerrang! | 5/5 stars |
| Mojo | 4/5 stars |
| musicOMH | 5/5 stars |
| NME | 9/10 |
| Pitchfork Media | 6.8/10 |
| Q | 4/5 stars |
| Rock Sound | 8/10 |
| Rolling Stone | 3/5 stars |

Mr Beast is the fifth studio album by the Scottish post-rock band Mogwai, released on March 6, 2006 on Play It Again Sam and Matador Records. Produced by Tony Doogan and the band itself, the album was recorded between April and October 2005 at the band's newly built home studio, Castle of Doom, in Glasgow.

Released to widespread critical acclaim, the album reached number 31 on the UK Albums Chart, number 17 on the Scottish Albums Chart and number 128 on the US Billboard 200.

== Overview ==
The album Mr Beast was released on 6 March 2006 in the UK and 7 March 2006 in the United States, in double LP vinyl format, a regular CD jewel case edition and limited deluxe edition package that comes with both the album on CD and a DVD documenting the recording process entitled The Recording of Mr Beast. The album has been described by Creation Records head Alan McGee as

...probably the best art rock album I've been involved with since Loveless. In fact, it's possibly better than Loveless.

referring to the influential 1991 album by My Bloody Valentine. Drummer Martin Bulloch describes it as

...the best record we've made since Mogwai Young Team.

The album's title stemmed from an incident where Barry Burns and Dominic Aitchison landed in Florida to tour with The Cure in 2005, when they saw a taxi driver standing outside the airport holding a sign that said "Mr. and Mrs. Beast" which, after a 10-hour flight, was "funnier than life itself".

== Artwork ==
The cover artwork for Mr Beast is a painting by Amanda Church entitled "Milkbar", and the accompanying booklet contains other works from her, all of a similar style. In addition, the Mogwai Young Team logo is displayed on the spine of the deluxe edition release, with a silhouette of Jesus on the cross visible within the logo.

== Track listing ==
All songs were written by Stuart Braithwaite, Dominic Aitchison, Martin Bulloch, John Cummings, and Barry Burns. Lyrics on "I Chose Horses" written by Envy vocalist Tetsuya Fukagawa.

| No. | Title | Length |
|---|---|---|
| 1. | "Auto Rock" | 4:18 |
| 2. | "Glasgow Mega-Snake" | 3:35 |
| 3. | "Acid Food" | 3:40 |
| 4. | "Travel Is Dangerous" | 4:01 |
| 5. | "Team Handed" | 3:58 |
| 6. | "Friend of the Night" | 5:30 |
| 7. | "Emergency Trap" | 3:31 |
| 8. | "Folk Death 95" | 3:34 |
| 9. | "I Chose Horses" | 5:13 |
| 10. | "We're No Here" | 5:39 |
| Total length: | | 43:07 |

Japanese edition bonus track (2006)
| No. | Title | Length |
|---|---|---|
| 11. | "1% Of Monster" | 3:48 |
| Total length: | | 46:55 |

== Personnel ==
Mogwai

- Stuart Braithwaite – guitar, vocals on "Acid Food"
- Dominic Aitchison – bass guitar
- Martin Bulloch – drums
- John Cummings – guitar
- Barry Burns – piano, guitar, flute, vocals on "Travel Is Dangerous", vocoder

Additional personnel

- Craig Armstrong – keyboard on "I Chose Horses"
- Tetsuya Fukagawa – vocals on "I Chose Horses"
- Tony Doogan – producer

== Charts ==
Chart performance for Mr Beast
| Chart (2006) | Peak position |
|---|---|
| Australian Albums (ARIA) | 95 |
| Belgian Albums (Ultratop Flanders) | 21 |
| Belgian Albums (Ultratop Wallonia) | 57 |
| Dutch Albums (Album Top 100) | 97 |
| French Albums (SNEP) | 94 |
| German Albums (Offizielle Top 100) | 65 |
| Norwegian Albums (VG-lista) | 38 |
| Scottish Albums (Official Charts) | 17 |
| Swiss Albums (Schweizer Hitparade) | 87 |
| UK Albums (Official Charts) | 31 |
| US Billboard 200 | 128 |
