= Batcat =

EP by Mogwai
- Released: 8 September 2008
- Recorded: Chem19 Studios; Hamilton, Scotland; Castle of Doom Studios; Glasgow, Scotland; Wire Recording Studios; Austin, Texas
- Genre: Post-rock
- Length: 14:32
- Label: Wall of Sound
- Producer: Andy Millar; Garth Jones; Tony Doogan; Stuart Sullivan

Mogwai chronology
Travel is Dangerous (2006)	Batcat (2008)	The Hawk Is Howling (2008)

Batcat is the ninth EP by Scottish post-rock band Mogwai. It was released on 8 September 2008 through Wall of Sound, three weeks prior to Mogwai's sixth studio album, The Hawk Is Howling, which also features the track "Batcat" (this EP version differs slightly, most notably the introduction of the drums). Mogwai worked in coordination with psychedelic singer Roky Erickson on the song "Devil Rides", which was the only song on the Batcat EP to include vocals.

== Track listing ==
All tracks are written by Mogwai, except where noted

12", CD and download
No.	Title	Lyrics	Length
1.	"Batcat"		5:23
2.	"Stupid Prick Gets Chased by the Police and Loses His Slut Girlfriend"		5:09
3.	"Devil Rides"	Roky Erickson	4:00
Total length:			14:32
