= The Twilight Sad discography =

- Studio albums: 6
- EPs: 5
- Live albums: 1
- Compilation albums: 4
- Singles: 15
- Music videos: 13

The discography of Scottish rock band The Twilight Sad consists of six studio albums, four compilation albums, fifteen singles, and five extended plays (EPs). The band currently consists of James Graham (vocals, lyrics) and Andy MacFarlane (guitar, instrumentation, production). The Kilsyth-based band formed in 2003 and were signed to Fat Cat Records when Alex Knight, co-founder of the label, went to Glasgow to watch the band perform their third gig and signed them on the spot.

The band released their debut EP The Twilight Sad in November 2006 in the United States only, followed by their debut album Fourteen Autumns & Fifteen Winters in April 2007, which garnered widespread critical acclaim. The album spawned two singles, "That Summer, at Home I Had Become the Invisible Boy" in April, and "And She Would Darken the Memory" in July. The following year, the band released Here, It Never Snowed. Afterwards It Did, a mini-album of reworked versions of songs from Fourteen Autumns & Fifteen Winters and two non-album tracks, inspired by stripped-down live performances. A collection of live versions and previously unreleased tracks entitled Killed My Parents and Hit the Road was released in December 2008.

The Twilight Sad's second studio album, Forget the Night Ahead, was released in September 2009 to further acclaim and marked a shift in the band's direction towards a darker and more streamlined sound. The album produced three singles: "I Became a Prostitute" in August 2009, "Seven Years of Letters" in October 2009, and "The Room" in April 2010. Founding bassist Craig Orzel left the band in February 2010, and the band released The Wrong Car EP in September of that year.

The Twilight Sad's third studio album, No One Can Ever Know, was released in February 2012 and marked another stylistic shift, with the band citing industrial music and krautrock influences for a darker, sparser sound. The album yielded two singles, "Sick" in November 2011 and "Another Bed" in February 2012 (both singles were released as limited edition 7" vinyl singles, with the non-album tracks "Untitled No. 67" and "A Million Ignorants", respectively); in addition to a collection of remixes entitled No One Can Ever Know: The Remixes, and a limited edition CD-R EP entitled N/O/C/E/K Tour EP, available only at select tour dates. In January 2014, the band released a free digital download and video of the band performing nine songs with the Royal Scottish National Orchestra, recorded live at Paisley Abbey in October 2013.

The band's fourth studio album, Nobody Wants to Be Here and Nobody Wants to Leave, was released in October 2014 to positive reviews, preceded by the download-only single "Last January" in September. A limited edition EP, entitled Òran Mór Session, was self-released by the band in late October 2014 and made available only at the band's tour dates (the EP was later expanded with additional tracks and given a wider commercial release in October 2015). The album's second single, "I Could Give You All That You Don't Want", was released on 9 February 2015 as a picture disc 7" vinyl single, with the exclusive double A-side track "The Airport". The album's third single, "It Never Was the Same", was released on 29 June 2015. The single was released as a double A-side on white-coloured 7" vinyl, with the exclusive track "There's a Girl in the Corner" as covered by Robert Smith of The Cure. Nobody Wants to Be Here turned out to be the band's last studio album with founding drummer Mark Devine, who amicably left the band in January 2018.

The Twilight Sad announced on 10 July 2018 that they had signed to Mogwai's label Rock Action Records, and released their new single "I/m Not Here [missing face]" for download and streaming. On 5 September, the band announced that their fifth studio album, titled and stylised as It Won/t Be Like This All the Time, would be released on 18 January 2019. The first proper single, "Videograms", preceded the album on 26 October 2018. The album's third single, "VTr", was released as a digital download only on 13 November 2018. The album was released to universally positive reviews. Two extra songs recorded during the album sessions, "Rats" and "Public Housing", were released as a limited edition double A-side 7" single on 6 December 2019.

After a long period of touring as a duo, Graham and MacFarlane announced their sixth studio album, It's the Long Goodbye, which was released on 27 March 2026. The album was preceded by three singles, "Waiting for the Phone Call" (featuring Robert Smith on guitar) in October 2025, "Designed to Lose" in January 2026 and "Attempt a Crash Landing – Theme" in February 2026.

== Studio albums ==
Year	Title	Peak chart positions		
Year	Title	SCO	UK	US Heat
2007	Fourteen Autumns & Fifteen Winters: Released: 3 April 2007; Label: Fat Cat (FATCD55); Formats: CD, limited edition CD, LP, DL	—	—	—
2009	Forget the Night Ahead: Released: 22 September 2009; Label: Fat Cat (FATCD77); Formats: CD, 2LP, DL	41	186	—
2012	No One Can Ever Know: Released: 6 February 2012; Label: Fat Cat (FATCD98); Formats: CD, LP, limited edition LP, DL	28	121	30
2014	Nobody Wants to Be Here and Nobody Wants to Leave: Released: 27 October 2014; Label: Fat Cat (FATCD132); Formats: CD, LP, DL	13	51	29
2019	It Won't Be Like This All the Time: Released: 18 January 2019; Label: Rock Action (ROCKACT116); Formats: CD, 2LP, limited edition blue-coloured 2LP, DL	1	17	9
2026	It's the Long Goodbye: Released: 27 March 2026; Label: Rock Action (ROCKACT155); Formats: CD, LP, various coloured-vinyl LPs, DL	3	42	—

== Live albums ==
List does not include the multiple Bandcamp-only releases recorded during the 2022 tour with The Cure and 2024 stripped back shows.

Year	Title	Details
2020	It Won/t Be Like This All the Time Live: Released: 16 April 2020; Label: Formats: Download/Streaming only	Live show collated from the November 2019 shows in London, Manchester and Edinburgh
2020	Òran Mór 2020: Released: 26 December 2020; Label: Formats: Download/Streaming only	Live show recorded at Òran Mór in October 2020, James Graham and Andy MacFarlane only

== Compilation albums ==
Year	Title	Details
2008	Killed My Parents and Hit the Road: Released: 8 December 2008 (released on vinyl 15 November 2019); Label: Fat Cat (FATCD87); Formats: CD, DL, LP	Collection of live and unreleased tracks.
2011	Demos: Released: 16 April 2011; Label: Fat Cat (FATTAPE01); Format: Cassette	Limited edition split cassette release with Frightened Rabbit for Record Store Day. Track listing: No. / Title / Artist / Length; 1. / "Be Less Rude" / Frightened Rabbit / 3:02; 2. / "I Feel Better" / Frightened Rabbit / 2:51; 3. / "Snake" / Frightened Rabbit / 2:26; 4. / "Keep Yourself Warm" / Frightened Rabbit / 5:33; 5. / "The Greys" / Frightened Rabbit / 2:41; 6. / "2d" / The Twilight Sad / 2:56; 7. / "3iv" / The Twilight Sad / 3:39; 8. / "2c" / The Twilight Sad / 2:27; 9. / "Ravishing Rick Rude" (Cover version of Frightened Rabbit's "Be Less Rude") / The Twilight Sad / 3:16
2012	No One Can Ever Know: The Remixes: Released: 19 November 2012; Label: Fat Cat (FATCD99); Formats: CD, LP, DL	Remixes of songs from No One Can Ever Know.
2014	Live at the Paisley Abbey: Released: 29 January 2014; Label: Self-released; Format: DL	Recorded live with the Royal Scottish National Orchestra at Paisley Abbey on 14 October 2013; conducted by John Logan. Track listing: No. / Title / Length; 1. / "The Wrong Car" / 7:11; 2. / "I Became a Prostitute" / 4:25; 3. / "Sick" / 4:45; 4. / "Mapped by What Surrounded Them" / 3:17; 5. / "Alphabet" / 4:37; 6. / "The Room" / 4:28; 7. / "That Summer, at Home I Had Become the Invisible Boy" / 3:45; 8. / "And She Would Darken the Memory" / 4:32; 9. / "Cold Days from the Birdhouse" / 5:12
2020	Òran Mór - music from Live Performance Film: Released: 26 December 2020; Label: Self-released; Format: DL	Recorded live in Òran Mór, a music venue in Glasgow that was formerly Kelvinside Parish Church, on 26 October 2020, for a film of the same name which was broadcast online on 5 December 2020; it was released as an album on the band's Bandcamp page. Track listing: No. / Title / Length; 1. / "3 Seconds Of Dead Air" / 5:13; 2. / "Vtr" / 4:14; 3. / "That Summer At Home, I Had Become The Invisible Boy" / 3:41; 4. / "And She Would Darken The Memory" / 2:55; 5. / "The Room" / 4:27; 6. / "Nobody Wants To Be Here And Nobody Wants To Leave" / 3:17; 7. / "Sick" / 4:27; 8. / "Alphabet" / 4:27; 9. / "Keep It All to Myself" / 3:00; 10. / "M" / 2:47; 11. / "Last January" / 5:06

== EPs ==
Year	Title
2006	The Twilight Sad: Released: 14 November 2006; Label: Fat Cat (CDFAT056); Formats: CD, DL
2008	Here, It Never Snowed. Afterwards It Did: Released: 9 June 2008; Label: Fat Cat (CDFAT078); Formats: CD, 12", DL
2010	The Wrong Car: Released: 27 September 2010; Label: Fat Cat (12FAT079); Formats: 12", DL
2012	N/O/C/E/K Tour EP: Released: 19 November 2012; Label: Self-released; Format: CD-R
2014	Òran Mór Session: Released: 26 October 2014 (limited edition CD); Reissued: 16 October 2015 (expanded CD & vinyl); Label: Self-released; Fat Cat (FATCD140); Formats: CD, 12", DL

== Singles ==
Year	Single	Details	Album
2007	"That Summer, at Home I Had Become the Invisible Boy": Released: 16 April 2007	7" (7FAT29): No. / Title / Length; 1. / "That Summer, at Home I Had Become the Invisible Boy" / 4:48; 2. / "Watching That Chair Painted Yellow" / 5:31	Fourteen Autumns and Fifteen Winters
2007	"And She Would Darken the Memory": Released: 16 July 2007	7" (7FAT32): No. / Title / Length; 1. / "And She Would Darken the Memory" / 5:49; 2. / "That Summer, at Home I Had Become the Invisible Boy" (Decomposed by Ensemble) / 4:17	Fourteen Autumns and Fifteen Winters
2009	"I Became a Prostitute": Released: 3 August 2009	7" (7FAT67): No. / Title / Length; 1. / "I Became a Prostitute" / 5:22; 2. / "In the Blackout" / 5:15	Forget the Night Ahead
2009	"Seven Years of Letters": Released: 19 October 2009	7" (7FAT49): No. / Title / Length; 1. / "Seven Years of Letters" / 4:34; 2. / "Suck" (The Wedding Present cover) / 3:25	Forget the Night Ahead
2010	"The Room": Released: 5 April 2010	7" (7FAT74): No. / Title / Length; 1. / "The Room" / 4:35; 2. / "The Neighbours Can't Breathe" (Acoustic) / 3:55	Forget the Night Ahead
2011	"Sick": Released: 14 November 2011	7" (7FAT84): No. / Title / Length; 1. / "Sick" / 4:23; 2. / "Untitled No. 67" (Demo) / 3:50	No One Can Ever Know
2012	"Another Bed": Released: 20 February 2012	7" (7FAT85): No. / Title / Length; 1. / "Another Bed" / 4:39; 2. / "A Million Ignorants" / 3:32	No One Can Ever Know
2013	The Twilight Sad vs. Bill Wells & Aidan Moffat Split 7": Released: 20 April 2013	7" (7FAT124): No. / Title / Length; 1. / "Alphabet" (covered by Bill Wells and Aidan Moffat) / 2:58; 2. / "(If You) Keep Me in Your Heart" (covered by The Twilight Sad) / 3:16	Non-album single
2014	"Last January": Released: 15 September 2014	Digital download: No. / Title / Length; 1. / "Last January" / 5:11	Nobody Wants to Be Here and Nobody Wants to Leave
2015	"I Could Give You All That You Don't Want": Released: 9 February 2015	7" (FAT143): No. / Title / Length; 1. / "I Could Give You All That You Don't Want" / 4:17; 2. / "The Airport" / 4:08	Nobody Wants to Be Here and Nobody Wants to Leave
2015	"It Never Was the Same": Released: 29 June 2015	7" (7FAT148): No. / Title / Length; 1. / "It Never Was the Same" / 5:00; 2. / "There's a Girl in the Corner" (Robert Smith version) / 3:52	Nobody Wants to Be Here and Nobody Wants to Leave
2018	"I/m Not Here [missing face]": Released: 10 July 2018	Digital download (ROCKACT117D): No. / Title / Length; 1. / "I/m Not Here [missing face]" / 5:38	It Won/t Be Like This All the Time
2018	"Videograms": Released: 26 October 2018	10" (etched/one-sided) (ROCKACT118T): No. / Title / Length; 1. / "Videograms" / 4:56	It Won/t Be Like This All the Time
2018	"VTr": Released: 13 November 2018	Digital download: No. / Title / Length; 1. / "VTr" / 4:19	It Won/t Be Like This All the Time
2019	"Rats"/"Public Housing": Released: 6 December 2019	7"(ROCKACT130S): No. / Title / Length; 1. / "Rats" / 3:19; 2. / "Public Housing" / 3:00	Non-album single

== Music videos ==
Year	Video	Director
2007	"And She Would Darken the Memory"	Mark Charlton
2009	"I Became a Prostitute"	Paul Spencer
2009	"Seven Years of Letters"	Adam Stafford
2010	"The Room"	Nicola Collins
2010	"The Wrong Car"	Nicola Collins
2012	"Another Bed"	Craig Murray
2012	"Dead City"	Nicola Collins
2014	"Last January"	Nicola Collins
2015	"I Could Give You All That You Don't Want"	Nicola Collins
2015	"It Never Was the Same"	Hand Held Cine Club
2018	"I/m Not Here [missing face]"	Brendan Jay Smith
2019	"VTr"	Michael Sherrington
2019	"Shooting Dennis Hopper Shooting"	Brendan Jay Smith & Cameron Gleave
