= Òran Mór 2020 =

Live album by the Twilight Sad
- Released: 26 December 2020
- Recorded: October 2020
- Venue: Òran Mór
- Genres: Post-punk revival, indie rock
- Length: 43:35
- Language: Scottish English
- Label: Rock Action
- Producer: Andy MacFarlane

The Twilight Sad chronology
It Won/t Be Like This All the Time Live (2020)	Òran Mór 2020 (2020)	It's the Long Goodbye (2026)

Òran Mór 2020 (stylized in all caps, also written Oran Mor 2020) is a live concert album by Scottish indie rock band the Twilight Sad, released as a "pay-what-you-want" download via Bandcamp by Rock Action Records on 26 December 2020. It features only vocalist James Graham and guitarist Andy MacFarlane, together with some programmed drums.

== Background ==
The album is the soundtrack to a live concert video recorded in October 2020 at Glasgow venue Òran Mór, which was shown as a paid stream on 5 December 2020, and was only available for viewing on that day. It features eleven tracks taken from all five of the band's studio albums, along with a cover of The Cure's "M". On 25 December, in a Twitter post wishing a Merry Christmas, the band said that they "also hear that sometimes the best presents arrive on the 26th". The following day, they announced that the concert video would be available to purchase again for three days (free to previous ticket holders), and also that the soundtrack would be released that day. It is titled to distinguish it from their previous acoustic Òran Mór Session, recorded at the same venue in 2015.

== Track listing ==
All lyrics are written by James Alexander Graham, except "M" by Robert Smith; all music is composed by Andy MacFarlane, except "M" by The Cure.

No.	Title	Original version appears on	Length
1.	"3 Seconds of Dead Air"	The Twilight Sad EP	5:13
2.	"VTr"	It Won/t Be Like This All the Time	4:14
3.	"That Summer, at Home I Had Become the Invisible Boy"	Fourteen Autumns & Fifteen Winters	3:41
4.	"And She Would Darken the Memory"	Fourteen Autumns & Fifteen Winters	2:55
5.	"The Room"	Forget the Night Ahead	4:27
6.	"Nobody Wants to Be Here and Nobody Wants to Leave"	Nobody Wants to Be Here and Nobody Wants to Leave	3:18
7.	"Sick"	No One Can Ever Know	4:27
8.	"Alphabet"	No One Can Ever Know	4:27
9.	"Keep It All to Myself"	It Won/t Be Like This All the Time	3:00
10.	"M"	Non-album cover song; originally from the Cure's Seventeen Seconds	2:47
11.	"Last January"	Nobody Wants to Be Here and Nobody Wants to Leave	5:06

== Personnel ==
Musicians

- James Alexander Graham – vocals
- Andy MacFarlane – guitars, programming

Production

- Andy MacFarlane – producer
- Michael Brennan – mixing

== Release history ==
Release formats for Oran Mor 2020
Country	Date	Label	Format	Catalogue #
Worldwide	26 December 2020	Rock Action Records	Download	
