= It Won/t Be Like This All the Time Live =

Live album by the Twilight Sad
- Released: 16 April 2020
- Recorded: November 2019
- Venues: Kentish Town Forum, O2 Ritz Manchester, Usher Hall
- Genres: Post-punk revival, indie rock
- Length: 101:07
- Language: Scottish English
- Label: Rock Action
- Producer: Andy MacFarlane

The Twilight Sad chronology
It Won/t Be Like This All the Time (2019)	It Won/t Be Like This All the Time Live (2020)	Òran Mór 2020 (2020)

It Won/t Be Like This All the Time Live (Note: The album and track titles are highly stylised intentionally, featuring upper and lower-case lettering, slashes ("/"), and brackets ("[ ]").) (stylized in all caps) is a live concert album by Scottish indie rock band the Twilight Sad, released via Bandcamp by Rock Action Records on 16 April 2020, and via other streaming platforms on 15 May 2020. The album was recorded on the band's short UK tour of November 2019 to promote their album It Won/t Be Like This All the Time, which was released to universally positive reviews in January 2019.

== Background ==
In November 2019 the band played a short UK tour of larger venues, at London's Kentish Town Forum, Manchester's O2 Ritz and Edinburgh's Usher Hall, the shows being professionally recorded. Singer James Graham said, "We have been talking about recording a live album for a long time. We think this is the best we've been playing as a live band and wanted to document that." In 2020, two shows were planned in quadrophonic sound at Glasgow's Barrowland Ballroom, but were eventually postponed due to the coronavirus pandemic.

Instead, on what would have been the day of the first show, the band released It Won/t Be Like This All the Time Live for download via Bandcamp on a "pay-what-you-like" basis. Graham commented, "Over the past few months we were figuring out how to release the album and then COVID-19/lockdown/gig cancellations happened. We quickly decided that we would release the album digitally on a pay what you want basis. The reason behind this is that we know that financially it is a worrying time for a lot of people and for ourselves included. We wanted to make sure we could give everyone who likes our band one of our gigs live in their living room as we can't be out in the world playing gigs right now".

On 17 April, the night of the second Glasgow show, fans were invited to take part in a listening party on Twitter, hosted by Tim Burgess, singer of The Charlatans. Graham said, "...we were supposed to be playing our second night at the famous Glasgow Barrowland Ballroom ... Let's pretend we're all at the gig together. All five of us will be taking part and sharing memories from past gigs, sharing thoughts on playing live and many other things."

== Track listing ==
All lyrics are written by James Alexander Graham, except "Keep Yourself Warm" by Scott Hutchison; all music is composed by Andy MacFarlane, except "Keep Yourself Warm" by Frightened Rabbit.

No.	Title	Original version appears on	Length
1.	"[10 Good Reasons for Modern Drugs]"	It Won/t Be Like This All the Time	6:41
2.	"Shooting Dennis Hopper Shooting"	It Won/t Be Like This All the Time	3:38
3.	"VTr"	It Won/t Be Like This All the Time	4:29
4.	"Don't Move"	No One Can Ever Know	4:20
5.	"Last January"	Nobody Wants to Be Here and Nobody Wants to Leave	5:44
6.	"That Summer, at Home I Had Become the Invisible Boy"	Fourteen Autumns & Fifteen Winters	4:02
7.	"The Arbor"	It Won/t Be Like This All the Time	4:26
8.	"I/m Not Here [missing face]"	It Won/t Be Like This All the Time	6:32
9.	"Sunday Day13"	It Won/t Be Like This All the Time	3:23
10.	"There's a Girl in the Corner"	Nobody Wants to Be Here and Nobody Wants to Leave	4:47
11.	"Seven Years of Letters"	Forget the Night Ahead	4:18
12.	"Auge/Maschine"	It Won/t Be Like This All the Time	5:48
13.	"Videograms"	It Won/t Be Like This All the Time	5:10
14.	"Let/s Get Lost"	It Won/t Be Like This All the Time	4:58
15.	"Cold Days from the Birdhouse"	Fourteen Autumns & Fifteen Winters	6:04
16.	"The Wrong Car"	The Wrong Car EP	7:03
17.	"Keep Yourself Warm"	Frightened Rabbit cover	11:36
18.	"And She Would Darken the Memory"	Fourteen Autumns & Fifteen Winters	8:05

== Personnel ==
Musicians

- James Alexander Graham – vocals
- Andy MacFarlane – guitars
- Jonathan Docherty – bass
- Brendan Smith – keyboards
- Sebastien Schultz – drums

Production

- Andy MacFarlane – producer
- Michael Brennan – mixing

== Release history ==
Release formats for It Won/t Be Like This All the Time Live
Country	Date	Label	Format	Catalogue #
Worldwide	16 April 2020	Rock Action Records	Download	
