= It Won/t Be Like This All the Time =

Studio album by the Twilight Sad
- Released: 18 January 2019
- Recorded: January–February 2018
- Studios: Middle Farm Studios, Devon, England
- Genres: Post-punk revival, indie rock
- Length: 46:38
- Language: Scottish English
- Label: Rock Action
- Producer: Andy MacFarlane

The Twilight Sad chronology
Òran Mór Session (2015)	It Won/t Be Like This All the Time (2019)	It Won/t Be Like This All the Time Live (2020)

Singles from It Won/t Be Like This All the Time
- 1. "I/m Not Here [missing face]" Released: 10 July 2018; 2. "Videograms" Released: 26 October 2018; 3. "VTr" Released: 13 November 2018; 4. "Shooting Dennis Hopper Shooting" Released: 2 April 2019

It Won/t Be Like This All the Time (Note: The album and track titles are highly stylised intentionally, featuring upper and lower-case lettering, slashes ("/"), and brackets ("[ ]").) (stylized in all caps) is the fifth studio album by Scottish indie rock band the Twilight Sad, released by Rock Action Records on 18 January 2019. The album is the band's first studio album on Rock Action (the band had previously been signed to Fat Cat Records since 2005), and their first since the amicable departure of founding member Mark Devine in early 2018. Three singles preceded the album's release, along with nationwide tours of the United States, Europe and the United Kingdom. The album title originates from the lyrics in the song "Sunday Day13".

It Won/t Be Like This All the Time was released to universally positive reviews, and charted at number 1 on the Scottish Albums Chart, and number 17 on the UK Albums Chart.

== Background ==
On 22 January 2018, The Twilight Sad announced via social media that drummer and founding member Mark Devine had amicably left the band. The band's new touring drummer, Sebastien Schultz, joined the band shortly thereafter, while session drummer Jonny Scott played drums on the album.

In an interview with NME, posted on 9 July 2018, guitarist/producer Andy MacFarlane stated that the band's fifth studio album is "finished", with a tentative release date of January 2019. MacFarlane said, "It all came together really well. To me, it's like a different band almost. I did a stupid thing of writing loads of music, then giving it to James to write stuff over, then I deleted all the music. So then I wrote another album under it... I think we just needed to shake up the routine. One of our mates bought us those Brian Eno Oblique Strategy cards. I picked one out and it was like 'delete everything, must try harder, don't tell James'. The aim was to try and do stuff that we'd enjoy playing live, to make it more interesting for ourselves as well as everyone else."

In the same interview, singer James Graham discussed the album's lyrics and themes, describing them as "heavier": "It's all pretty full on but there's some lighter shades and some hope on there. The first song that we're going to come back with epitomises the record. It's got really noisy guitars but it's pretty melodic. I think it's the next stage of who we're meant to be. ...I won't say exactly what it's dealing with [lyrically] because a lot of it might be quite obvious, but I'm not hiding behind a lot of metaphors anymore. I've done that, what's the point in trying to do it again? I'm really proud of our lyrics in the past but this is just what came out. I don't need to hide behind anything any more. It's a bit of a leap to just go 'this is actually how I'm feeling.' I think now is the time to just be more open and honest with people. For myself it was important to say these things, but when it was done it was great to share it's okay to feel that way."

In mid-2018, The Twilight Sad played their first live shows for some 20 months. A new track, "The Arbor", was premiered at Primavera Sound on 31 May, followed by two more ("Shooting Dennis Hopper Shooting" and "VTr") at the Brudenell Social Club in Leeds on 16 June. On 10 July, the band shared a further new track, "I/m Not Here [missing face]", and announced a tour of the United States and Europe in the autumn. On 5 September, the album was officially announced, and the album's first proper single, closing track "Videograms", was made available for streaming, with a physical release for the single on 10" vinyl released on 26 October 2018. The album's third single, "VTr", was released for streaming and digital download only on 13 November 2018.

Ahead of the album's release, on 3 January 2019, the band shared a free download of "Videograms" as remixed by Andrew Weatherall. Additionally, on 9 January 2019, the official music video for "VTr" premiered online. A music video for the album's digital-only de facto fourth single "Shooting Dennis Hopper Shooting" premiered on 2 April 2019. The video contains old film footage belonging to the band's keyboardist Brendan Jay Smith, and was directed by Smith and Cameron Gleave.

== Songs ==
According to Andy MacFarlane, first single "I/m Not Here [missing face]" was born out of the same 'chord shapes' as Erik Satie's "Ogives". Lyrically, James Graham described the song as being about "my ongoing battle with not liking myself, trying to be a good person but constantly feeling like I'm failing myself and everyone I care about."

In an interview with The Line of Best Fit, Graham and MacFarlane revealed the details behind third single "VTr". Graham said, "Andy called the song "VTr" at the demo stage of writing and we decided to stick with that when it came time to decide on track titles. After the album had been finished and all the songs had been named, as I was walking my wife into the hospital as she was going into labour with our son, I looked down at the pavement and spray painted there was VTR. I think the line "there's no love too small" is one of the most hopeful I've ever written – seeing that song title on the ground as I was entering the hospital to have the most life-affirming moment in my life blew my mind. That line came into my head one dark day as all I could see was bad news all around me and all I needed was a bit of good news or compassion to get me through the day no matter how small. Unfortunately, I didn't see it so the lines "I won't be surprised if it kills us all" came soon after." MacFarlane explained that the music of "VTr" evolved from taking sections of Brian Eno's song "The Big Ship" (from 1975's Another Green World), putting them into a sampler and creating loops to play along to on his guitar, and developed the melodies and chords from there.

== Critical reception ==
Professional ratings
Aggregate scores
Source	Rating
Metacritic	84/100
Review scores
Source	Rating
AllMusic	4/5 stars
Clash	very positive
DIY	4/5 stars
Drowned in Sound	10/10
The Guardian	4/5 stars
The Irish Times	4/5 stars
The Line of Best Fit	9.5/10
NME	4/5 stars
Paste	8.2/10
PopMatters	9/10
The Skinny	5/5 stars

It Won/t Be Like This All the Time was released to universal critical acclaim. At Metacritic, which assigns a normalised rating out of 100 based on reviews from mainstream critics, the album has received a score of 84, based on 15 reviews. The Guardian awarded the album four stars and stated, "There's certainly nothing new about their sound and fury and throbbing basslines – they fit comfortably into a lineage stretching from The Cure and The Chameleons to The Killers and White Lies – but they have timeless, high-quality songs." PopMatters wrote, "The squalling, shoegaze guitars of Fourteen Autumns & Fifteen Winters, the brooding electronics of No One Can Ever Know, [and] the raw intimacy of Nobody Wants to Be Here and Nobody Wants to Leave are all present but they are melded with fresh, nuanced sonic textures and bright, emphatic post-punk synths all injected with more direct pop hooks and melodies. What's left is an album informed by all of their musical experiences and as such works as their definitive artistic statement."

The album produced their third longlisting for the Scottish Album of the Year Award.

== Track listing ==
All lyrics are written by James Alexander Graham; all music is composed by Andy MacFarlane

No.	Title	Length
1.	"[10 Good Reasons for Modern Drugs]"	4:08
2.	"Shooting Dennis Hopper Shooting"	3:24
3.	"The Arbor"	4:19
4.	"VTr"	4:16
5.	"Sunday Day13"	3:33
6.	"I/m Not Here [missing face]"	5:38
7.	"Auge/Maschine"	4:41
8.	"Keep It All to Myself"	3:01
9.	"Girl Chewing Gum"	4:03
10.	"Let/s Get Lost"	4:40
11.	"Videograms"	4:55

== Personnel ==
Musicians

- James Alexander Graham – vocals
- Andy MacFarlane – guitars
- Jonathan Docherty – bass
- Brendan Smith – keyboards
- Jonny Scott – drums, percussion

Production

- Andy MacFarlane – production
- Andrew Bush – engineering
- Chris Coady – mixing
- Greg Calbi – mastering
- Dave "DLT" Thomas – artwork
- Robert Smith – "vambo" (musical guidance)

== Charts ==
Chart (2019)	Peak position
German Albums (Offizielle Top 100)	99
Scottish Albums (Official Charts)	1
UK Albums (Official Charts)	17
Belgian Albums (Ultratop Wallonia)	168

== Release history ==
Country	Date	Label	Format	Catalogue #
United Kingdom, Europe and United States	18 January 2019	Rock Action Records	CD	ROCKACT116CD
United Kingdom, Europe and United States	18 January 2019	Rock Action Records	2LP	ROCKACT116LP
United Kingdom, Europe and United States	18 January 2019	Rock Action Records	2LP (blue-coloured vinyl)	ROCKACT116LPX
