= The Wrong Car =

EP by the Twilight Sad
- Released: 27 September 2010
- Recorded: Chem19 Studios, Hamilton, South Lanarkshire, Scotland
- Genre: Indie rock
- Length: 21:09
- Language: Scottish English
- Label: FatCat
- Producer: Andy MacFarlane

The Twilight Sad chronology
Forget the Night Ahead (2009)	The Wrong Car (2010)	No One Can Ever Know (2012)

The Wrong Car is an EP by the Scottish indie rock band the Twilight Sad, released on 27 September 2010. The EP has two previously unreleased tracks, "The Wrong Car" and "Throw Yourself Into the Water Again", as well as two remixes of tracks from the band's second album Forget the Night Ahead: "The Room" remixed by Mogwai, and "Reflection of the Television" remixed by Errors. In late May 2010, Errors' remix of "Reflection of the Television" was chosen as The Line of Best Fit's "song of the day" and was made available as a free download. In January 2010, The Twilight Sad provided a remix of Errors' song "Bridge or Cloud?", which was posted as a free download on NME's website.

"The Wrong Car" was posted on the band's official MySpace page in late July 2010. NME placed the song on its list of "10 Tracks You Have to Hear This Week" on 23 July 2010.

== Recording and release ==
"The Wrong Car" and "Throw Yourself Into the Water Again" were worked on during the sessions for Forget the Night Ahead at Chem19 Studios in Hamilton, South Lanarkshire, Scotland. "Throw Yourself Into the Water Again" was inspired by a line from Camus' La Chute (The Fall).

According to the vocalist James Graham, the title track "was meant to be first song on [Forget the Night Ahead]. When we heard the demo we thought we definitely wanted it to be the first song. But it didn't really work out in the studio how we wanted it to. Then "Reflection of the Television" came out from nowhere and we thought that would be a great start." The Twilight Sad's keyboard player Martin "Dok" Doherty said that "if we had put 'The Wrong Car' on the record the way it was, it wouldn't have fitted anywhere apart from the start. [...] We went back to it four months later and came up with something a bit closer to the original demo."

A music video was produced for "The Wrong Car", directed by Nicola Collins, who had previously directed the video for "The Room". The video premiered on 23 August 2010. Collins said of the making of the video, "When I first listened to the track, it was so honest and powerful that I couldn't help but feel reflective, so the video was born out of how I was feeling at that particular moment in time, it was like shedding a nightmare. Working with a puppet was wonderful, he didn't whine once and he had no ego!"

The Wrong Car EP was released as a digital download and on 12" vinyl only. Graham said of the release, "I don't really view it as an EP, it's more of a twelve-inch single that has a few of our friends' remixes on it."

== Critical reception ==
Professional ratings
Review scores
Source	Rating
The Ark	(9/10)
Drowned in Sound	(7/10)
The List	4/5 stars
One Thirty BPM	(68%)
The Skinny	4/5 stars

The Wrong Car was released to generally positive reviews. Both The Skinny and The List awarded the EP 4 out of 5 stars, while the online music blog There Goes the Fear noted that the title track "benefits from repeated listens, building a mood of yearning and desperation over the course of its 7 minutes." Drowned in Sound stated that "The Twilight Sad are establishing a band tradition of providing fans with a little titbit with which to satiate themselves while they start work on new material, much as they did with the Here, It Never Snowed. Afterwards It Did EP", but summarised that while the EP is an "extremely satisfying stop-gap" release, its brevity "provides few clues as to where they're headed" musically.

== Track listing ==
All tracks are written by Andy MacFarlane and James Graham.

No.	Title	Length
1.	"The Wrong Car"	7:29
2.	"Throw Yourself Into the Water Again"	4:44
3.	"The Room" (Mogwai Remix)	4:39
4.	"Reflection of the Television" (Errors Remix)	4:17

== Credits ==
- Andy MacFarlane – producer
- Paul Savage – co-producer, recording, mixing
- Jamie Savage – co-engineer
- Mark Devine – co-producer
- Martin "Dok" Doherty – "noise strings"
- Laura McFarlane – strings
- "The Room" remixed by Stuart Braithwaite
- "Reflection of the Television" produced by Simon Ward
- dlt – artwork
