= Remember Remember =

Scottish band, active from 2006 to 2015

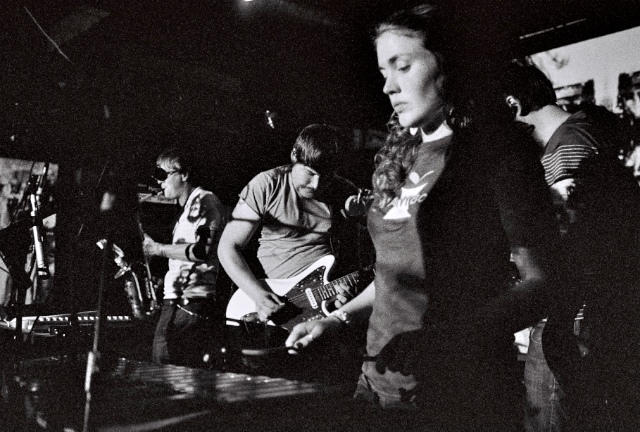
- Remember Remember (2009)

Background information
- Origin: Glasgow, Scotland
- Genres: Post-rock, instrumental rock, experimental music
- Years active: 2006–2015
- Label: Rock Action
- Past members: Graeme Ronald; James Swinburne; Joseph Quimby; Tommy Stuart; Joanne Murtagh; Andy Brown; Steven Kane
- Website: rememberremember.blogspot.co.uk

Remember Remember were a Scottish instrumental band originating from Glasgow. Active between 2006 and 2015, they released three albums and other work on the Rock Action label, run by fellow Glasgow band Mogwai, with whom the band have also toured.

== History ==
Remember Remember were originally the work of a single musician, Graeme Ronald, playing multiple instruments, including unusual percussion such as scissors, cutlery, coffee spoons, lighters and matches. The 2008 self-titled album was performed by Ronald with a few collaborators, including James Swinburne, who would later be part of the band, and James Hamilton from Errors. The band was gradually expanded in terms of musicians, until by later 2009 there were seven members; the first music released by this line-up was the "RR Scorpii" EP in 2010 and The Quickening album in 2011, which also featured RM Hubbert.

The band announced on 15 May 2014 the release of their third album Forgetting the Present. The album was released by Rock Action on 30 June 2014.

Graeme Ronald announced the band's split in June 2015, with their final gig played that month.

== Musical style ==
The band was completely instrumental and Ronald has commented on this, saying "When you’re in a band and you’ve got a singer the focal point is there instantly. It’s not that the music doesn’t matter, but you can get away with the music being less interesting..." Although described as post-rock, Ronald was quick to point out that the association of this label with guitar heavy music is not as relevant to the band, who use a far wider range of instrumentation.

== Discography ==
=== Albums ===
- Remember Remember (2008)
- The Quickening (2011)
- Forgetting the Present (2014)

=== Singles and EPs ===
- "The Dancing" (7" single, 2009)
- "RR Scorpii" (12" EP, 2010)
