= Killed My Parents and Hit the Road =

Compilation album by the Twilight Sad
- Released: 8 December 2008
- Recorded: 2006–2008
- Venue: O2 ABC Glasgow (live tracks)
- Studios: Chem19 Studios; home recordings (demos and studio tracks)
- Genres: Indie rock, shoegaze
- Length: 49:49
- Language: Scottish English
- Label: FatCat
- Producer: The Twilight Sad

The Twilight Sad chronology
| Here, It Never Snowed. Afterwards It Did (2008) | Killed My Parents and Hit the Road (2008) | Forget the Night Ahead (2009) |

Killed My Parents and Hit the Road is a compilation album by Scottish indie rock band the Twilight Sad, released by FatCat Records on 8 December 2008. The compilation is composed of live tracks, covers and previously unreleased material, and was made to "help fund their tour with Mogwai" in late 2008. The compilation was initially limited to 1,000 CD copies only, and was only made available at live shows, in independent record shops, and at FatCat's official website. The CD has not been repressed, but the album was made available digitally shortly after the CD release, and pressed on vinyl for the first time in November 2019.

The album artwork and name are homages to the 1990 Sonic Youth album Goo. According to vocalist James Graham, the Goo pastiche was the idea of guitarist Andy MacFarlane. Graham commented, "[The Twilight Sad] were playing in America with Mogwai [...] and Thurston Moore [came] to the gig. So we were thinking 'fuck' and hoping he didn't see the merchandise table. They haven't sued us though. Yet."

The first six tracks were recorded at the ABC in Glasgow on 9 October 2008. "Untitled #28" and "Untitled #27" were later featured on the band's second studio album, Forget the Night Ahead, as "The Neighbours Can't Breathe" and "The Room", respectively.

== Track listing ==
All tracks are written by Andy MacFarlane and James Graham, except where noted.

| No. | Title | Writer(s) | Length |
|---|---|---|---|
| 1. | "Walking for Two Hours" (Live) | | 5:02 |
| 2. | "That Summer, at Home I Had Become the Invisible Boy" (Live) | | 4:09 |
| 3. | "Untitled #28" (Live) | | 5:45 |
| 4. | "Cold Days from the Birdhouse" (Live) | | 5:54 |
| 5. | "And She Would Darken the Memory" (Live) | | 5:23 |
| 6. | "Twenty Four Hours" (Live; Joy Division cover) | Ian Curtis, Bernard Sumner, Peter Hook, Stephen Morris | 5:08 |
| 7. | "The Weather Is Bad" (from the short film Brilliant Noise) | | 5:09 |
| 8. | "Half a Person" (The Smiths cover) | Morrissey, Johnny Marr | 3:36 |
| 9. | "Untitled #27" | | 4:05 |
| 10. | "Modern Romance" (Yeah Yeah Yeahs cover) | Karen O, Nick Zinner, Brian Chase | 2:14 |
| 11. | "I Was Hoping Winter Was Over" | | 3:17 |

== Release history ==
| Country | Date | Label | Format | Catalogue # |
|---|---|---|---|---|
| Europe | 8 December 2008 | FatCat Records | CD | FATCD87 |
| Europe | 15 November 2019 | FatCat Records | LP | FATLP87 |
| Europe | 15 November 2019 | FatCat Records | LP (limited edition yellow-coloured vinyl; Rough Trade exclusive) | FATLP87LTD |

== Credits ==
- James Graham – vocals
- Andy MacFarlane – guitars, noise
- Craig Orzel – bass
- Mark Devine – drums
- Martin "Dok" Doherty – keyboards (tracks 1–6)

=== Production ===
- Iain Cook – mixing, mastering
- Andy MacFarlane – mixing ("The Weath-er Is Bad")
- Andreas Jonsson – recording (tracks 1–6)
- Peter Katis – recording, mixing ("I Was Hoping Winter Was Over")
