= The Room (song) =

Single by The Twilight Sad

from the album Forget the Night Ahead
- B-side: "The Neighbours Can't Breathe" (Acoustic)
- Released: 5 April 2010
- Recorded: Chem19 Studios
- Genre: Indie rock, shoegazing
- Length: 4:17 (radio edit); 4:35 (album version)
- Label: Fat Cat (FAT74)
- Songwriters: James Graham, Andy MacFarlane
- Producer: Andy MacFarlane

The Twilight Sad singles chronology
"Seven Years of Letters" (2009)	"The Room" (2010)	"Sick" (2011)

"The Room" is a song by Scottish indie rock band The Twilight Sad. The song was released as the third single from the band's second studio album, Forget the Night Ahead. It was released on 5 April 2010 on Fat Cat Records. The song features violin by Laura McFarlane of fellow Scottish band My Latest Novel, and was the first song to be written for the record.

"The Room" was first released as an acoustic version, under the title "Untitled #27", on the band's 2008 compilation album Killed My Parents and Hit the Road. The title of the song was inspired by the 1971 Hubert Selby Jr. novel, The Room.

The B-side of the single is an acoustic version of "The Neighbours Can't Breathe", a song also featured on Forget the Night Ahead.

== Music video ==
The video for the song premiered on 25 February 2010 on The Line of Best Fit. It was directed by Nicola Collins, whose filmmaking work includes the award-winning documentary The End. The video features David Lynch's granddaughter in the starring role.

== Track listing ==
All tracks are written by Andy MacFarlane (music) and James Graham (lyrics).

No.	Title	Length
1.	"The Room"	4:35
2.	"The Neighbours Can't Breathe" (Acoustic)	3:55

== Credits ==
- James Alexander Graham – vocals
- Andy MacFarlane – guitar
- Craig Orzel – bass
- Mark Devine – drums
- Produced by Andy MacFarlane
- Co-produced by Mark Devine and Paul Savage
- Recorded and mixed by Paul Savage
- Mastered by Alan Douches
- dlt – artwork
