= I Became a Prostitute =

Single by The Twilight Sad

from the album Forget the Night Ahead
- B-side: "In the Blackout"
- Released: 3 August 2009
- Recorded: Chem19 Studios
- Genre: Indie rock, shoegazing
- Length: 4:31 (radio edit); 5:22 (album version)
- Label: Fat Cat (FAT67)
- Songwriters: James Graham, Andy MacFarlane
- Producer: Andy MacFarlane

The Twilight Sad singles chronology
"And She Would Darken the Memory" (2007)	"I Became a Prostitute" (2009)	"Seven Years of Letters" (2009)

"I Became a Prostitute" (listed as "I Became a..." on radio station promos) is a song by Scottish indie rock band The Twilight Sad. The song was released as the first single from the band's second studio album, Forget the Night Ahead. It was released on 3 August 2009 on Fat Cat Records.

The title of the song is "a metaphor for becoming something that you don't want to be, you can see it happening but there is nothing you can do about it." Guitarist Andy MacFarlane notes that:

This song is not about being a whore, it's a line from the Jean-Luc Godard film, Vivre sa Vie, that seemed to fit with the concept of the lyrics. I'm not sure if we shot ourselves in the foot with that title, seeing as it was the first single. For radio, it had to be called "I Became a ........" because the word 'prostitute' is apparently offensive. This one came together quite easily when writing it and always stood out to be a single.

== Track listing ==
All tracks are written by Andy MacFarlane (music) and James Graham (lyrics).

No.	Title	Length
1.	"I Became a Prostitute"	5:22
2.	"In the Blackout"	5:15

== Credits ==
- James Alexander Graham – vocals
- Andy MacFarlane – guitar
- Craig Orzel – bass
- Mark Devine – drums
- Produced by Andy MacFarlane
- Co-produced by Mark Devine and Paul Savage
- Recorded and mixed by Paul Savage
- Mastered by Alan Douches
- dlt – artwork
