= Seven Years of Letters =

Single by The Twilight Sad

from the album Forget the Night Ahead
- B-side: "Suck"
- Released: 19 October 2009
- Recorded: Chem19 Studios
- Genre: Indie rock, shoegazing
- Length: 3:41 (radio edit); 4:34 (album version)
- Label: Fat Cat (FAT49)
- Songwriters: James Graham, Andy MacFarlane
- Producer: Andy MacFarlane

The Twilight Sad singles chronology
"I Became a Prostitute" (2009)	"Seven Years of Letters" (2009)	"The Room" (2010)

"Seven Years of Letters" is a song by Scottish indie rock band The Twilight Sad. The song was released as the second single from the band's second studio album, Forget the Night Ahead. It was released on 19 October 2009 on Fat Cat Records. The B-side of the single is an acoustic cover of British post-punk band The Wedding Present, originally from their 1991 album Seamonsters.

Guitarist Andy MacFarlane notes that, "We didn't ever intend to have the first three songs in the order that they were released, that's just a coincidence. This one has a guitar solo and a creaky piano seat." About the lyrics, vocalist James Graham said, "The lyrics in the song revolve around running away from things and people."

== Track listing ==
No.	Title	Writer(s)	Length
1.	"Seven Years of Letters"	Andy MacFarlane, James Graham	4:34
2.	"Suck"	David Gedge	3:25

== Credits ==
- James Alexander Graham – vocals
- Andy MacFarlane – guitar
- Craig Orzel – bass
- Mark Devine – drums
- Produced by Andy MacFarlane
- Co-produced by Mark Devine and Paul Savage
- Recorded and mixed by Paul Savage
- Mastered by Alan Douches
- dlt – artwork
