= Òran Mór Session =

Live album by the Twilight Sad
- Released: 16 October 2015
- Recorded: Òran Mór, 1 September 2014; Goodison House, 5 January 2015
- Genres: Post-punk revival, indie rock
- Length: 34:43
- Language: Scottish English
- Label: FatCat
- Producers: Andrew Bush and The Twilight Sad

The Twilight Sad chronology
| Nobody Wants to Be Here and Nobody Wants to Leave (2014) | Òran Mór Session (2015) | It Won/t Be Like This All the Time (2019) |

Òran Mór Session is a live recording by Scottish indie rock band the Twilight Sad, self-released as a limited edition tour-only CD EP in October 2014. The session was reissued with additional tracks and given a wider commercial release on 16 October 2015 via Fat Cat Records.

On 26 October 2014, the band announced via Instagram and Facebook that a limited edition CD entitled Òran Mór Session would be available at their live tour dates throughout 2014. The CD comes in a hand-stamped and individually-numbered cardboard sleeve, and features stripped-down versions of five tracks from their fourth studio album Nobody Wants to Be Here and Nobody Wants to Leave, in addition to a cover of Arthur Russell's song "I Couldn't Say It to Your Face". The tracks were recorded at the Òran Mór in Glasgow, a music venue that was converted from the Kelvinside Hillhead Parish Church.

An expanded CD and 12" vinyl pressing of the recording session was released on 16 October 2015. The reissue features nine tracks recorded at the Òran Mór and Goodison House in Glasgow, with the addition of "Drown So I Can Watch", "Leave the House", and B-side "The Airport" which were not included on the limited CD release.

== Critical reception ==
Professional ratings
Aggregate scores
| Source | Rating |
|---|---|
| Metacritic | (70/100) |
Review scores
| Source | Rating |
| AllMusic | 3.5/5 stars |
| Clash | (7/10) |
| Drowned in Sound | (8/10) |
| MusicOMH | 3/5 stars |
| Under the Radar | (7.5/10) |

Òran Mór Session was released to generally positive reviews. At Metacritic, which assigns a normalised rating out of 100 based on reviews from mainstream critics, the album has received a score of 70, based on 9 reviews. Luke Beardsworth of Drowned in Sound said the acoustic reworkings allow "some reverb-heavy guitar and those bleak vocals to come to the front of the album and shine. As a result, this album is all the more accessible and immediate, and takes you to a completely different place. It's still miserable though. It's still got that dark treasure that you look for in a Twilight Sad record but this time you don't have to look so hard." His review criticized that the album will likely only appeal to existing fans, but concluded that, "The real strength of the record comes in giving you that reason to come back to Nobody Wants to Be Here and Nobody Wants to Leave in a way that provides something new." Clash praised the album as "organic, intimate and well worth adding to anyone's collection" and awarded the album a 7 out of 10 rating. musicOMH gave the album a lukewarm rating, stating that, "It's obvious that [Nobody Wants to Be Here and Nobody Wants to Leave] contained very good songs, but the reliance on the atmospherics created by synths, pounding basslines and heavy guitar passages added considerable weight to these songs; when you take all that away, it leaves a hole."

== Track listings ==
All tracks are written by James Alexander Graham (lyrics) and Andy MacFarlane (music), except where noted.

Limited edition CD EP
| No. | Title | Writer(s) | Length |
|---|---|---|---|
| 1. | "Nobody Wants to Be Here and Nobody Wants to Leave" | | 3:02 |
| 2. | "Last January" | | 4:33 |
| 3. | "It Never Was the Same" | | 4:16 |
| 4. | "Pills I Swallow" | | 3:53 |
| 5. | "I Could Give You All That You Don't Want" | | 4:20 |
| 6. | "I Couldn't Say It to Your Face" | Charles Arthur Russell Jr. | 2:40 |

Reissue CD and vinyl LP
| No. | Title | Writer(s) | Length |
|---|---|---|---|
| 1. | "Nobody Wants to Be Here and Nobody Wants to Leave" | | 3:02 |
| 2. | "Last January" | | 4:33 |
| 3. | "It Never Was the Same" | | 4:16 |
| 4. | "Pills I Swallow" | | 3:53 |
| 5. | "I Could Give You All That You Don't Want" | | 4:20 |
| 6. | "Drown So I Can Watch" | | 2:55 |
| 7. | "The Airport" | | 4:08 |
| 8. | "Leave the House" | | 4:29 |
| 9. | "I Couldn't Say It to Your Face" | Arthur Russell | 2:40 |

== Credits ==
- Recorded by Andrew Bush at Òran Mór and Goodison House on 1 September 2014 and 5 January 2015.
- Mixed by Andrew Bush at Goodison House.
- Mastered by Alan Douches at West West Side Music, New York.
- DLT – artwork, design

== Release history ==
| Country | Date | Label | Format | Catalogue # |
|---|---|---|---|---|
| Worldwide | 27 October 2014 | Self-released | CD EP | |
| Worldwide | 16 October 2015 | Fat Cat Records | CD, 12" vinyl | FATCD140; FATLP140 |
