= No One Can Ever Know =

Album by The Twilight Sad

Studio album by the Twilight Sad
- Released: 6 February 2012
- Recorded: January – March 2011
- Studios: The Pool and Sub Bubble Studios, London
- Genres: Post-punk revival, dark wave, industrial
- Length: 44:50
- Language: Scottish English
- Label: FatCat
- Producers: The Twilight Sad, Andrew Weatherall

The Twilight Sad chronology
The Wrong Car (2010)	No One Can Ever Know (2012)	Nobody Wants to Be Here and Nobody Wants to Leave (2014)

Singles from No One Can Ever Know
- 1. "Sick" Released: 14 November 2011; 2. "Another Bed" Released: 20 February 2012

No One Can Ever Know is the third studio album by Scottish indie rock band the Twilight Sad, released by FatCat Records on 6 February 2012 in the UK, and a day later in the US. The album was produced by the band with assistance and advice from producer Andrew Weatherall, who helped the band in experimenting with analog synthesizers. No One Can Ever Know marks a shift in the band's "wall of sound" approach towards a darker, more industrial-influenced sound. Guitarist Andy MacFarlane describes the album's sound as "sparser... with a colder, slightly militant feel," influenced by artists such as Siouxsie and the Banshees, Can, Public Image Ltd, Fad Gadget, Cabaret Voltaire, Wire, Bauhaus, Magazine and D.A.F.

The album follows over two years since their previous full-length Forget the Night Ahead in September 2009, and the EP release The Wrong Car in September 2010. The band released a new song, the album's closing track "Kill It in the Morning", for free on their new website and SoundCloud page on 21 September 2011. The first proper single from the album, "Sick", was made available as a 7" vinyl single and digital download on 14 November 2011. The album's second single, "Another Bed", followed the album on 20 February 2012 as a limited edition, hand-stamped and numbered 7" single (limited to 200 copies) and digital download. Although the song was not released as a single, a music video was produced for "Dead City", directed by frequent collaborator Nicola Collins, and premiered online in April 2012.

The album also yielded two companion releases: No One Can Ever Know: The Remixes, featuring remixes from Liars, Com Truise, and Tom Furse from The Horrors; and N/O/C/E/K Tour EP, a limited release featuring alternate and demo recordings. In 2020, the original vinyl LP, after long being out of print, was repressed as a burgundy-coloured limited edition.

== Background and recording ==
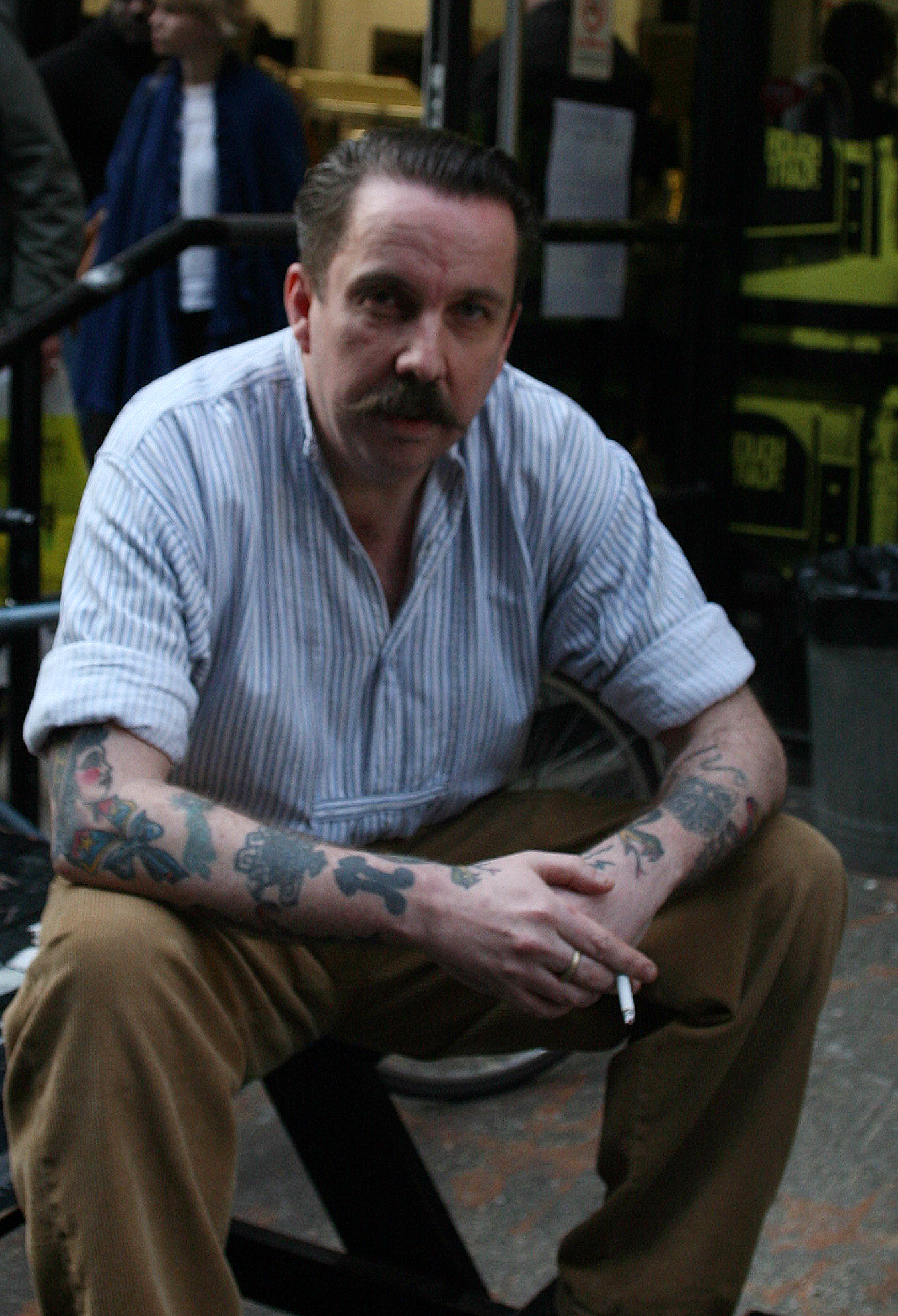
Andrew Weatherall, pictured here in 2009, aided the band with recording No One Can Ever Know, and was credited as "anti-producer".

While on tour with Errors in October 2010, vocalist James Graham stated in an interview with blog Peenko that "the next [album] is not going to be anything like the first two. [...] The wall of sound is kinda gone. Andy [MacFarlane]'s demos involve a lot of keyboards, and it's a lot more considered." The Twilight Sad's supporting musician at the time, Martin Doherty, also stated that "the band who make the same record over and over don't have a very long career... It's much stronger to make the record you want to make at the time than to try and pander to the people who already listen to your band." The band relocated to London to begin recording the new album in January 2011, where they received production help from Andrew Weatherall. In an interview with The Journal, Graham stated that Weatherall was initially slated to produce the album, but instead provided the band with assistance throughout the recording process and gave the band reassurance in their direction. The Twilight Sad also borrowed vintage analog synthesizers from producer Ben Hillier and Tape Studios in Edinburgh, which provide the core sounds on No One Can Ever Know.

== Writing and composition ==
In late January 2012, an exclusive interview with James Graham by webzine This Is Fake DIY appeared online, with Graham providing details for each song on the album. Graham stated that the tracks "Dead City" and "Kill It in the Morning" came from the same demo sessions, which were the last tracks written for the album. "Sick", "Not Sleeping", "Don't Move", and "Don't Look at Me" were among the first songs written for the album, with the latter two acting as a two-part narrative. "Another Bed" was the very first song the band wrote, following the recording of previous album, Forget the Night Ahead. The song caused debate among the band, as it was initially intended to be a B-side. Graham elaborated, "Sometimes a song that you don't think will be on the album turns into something completely different when you record it in the studio... It's probably the closest thing we've ever had to a proper single, although this album is meant to be listened to as a whole and 'Another Bed' is a chapter in the overall theme of the record. It's strange how a song that wasn't going to be on the album is now a single, that's just the way things work out sometimes. I'm glad we decided to have it on the record."

Regarding the album's lyrical content, Graham noted, "It's definitely not a happy album, put it that way. [...] I mean, the themes of the record are kind of tied in with the title – so I'm not going to tell anyone what they're about. I kind of wanted the whole thing to be a story." The album's title comes from a lyric in the song "Dead City".

== Critical reception ==
Professional ratings
Aggregate scores
Source	Rating
Metacritic	(76/100)
Review scores
Source	Rating
AllMusic	3.5/5 stars
The A.V. Club	B+
BBC	(very favourable)
Consequence of Sound	3.5/5 stars
Contactmusic.com	(8/10)
Drowned in Sound	(8/10)
MusicOMH	4/5 stars
NME	(5/10)
Pitchfork	(7.4/10)
PopMatters	(7/10)

No One Can Ever Know was met with highly positive reviews and was featured in many year-end best-of lists of music magazines. In an early preview album review, online website The Blue Walrus noted comparisons to Manic Street Preachers' The Holy Bible and Nine Inch Nails' The Downward Spiral, and finalised that "Some people may think that they know what to expect with a new Twilight Sad record, but if you thought you knew this band, you're in for the shock of your life. This is going to turn heads come early February, make no mistake." Drowned in Sound praised the album as "a third consecutive triumph... one that's best appreciated with uneasy moonlight and sandpaper-on-brain loudness." Dusted magazine wrote in a similarly positive review, "The band that used to build shimmering, gorgeous, barely moving walls of tone is in a hurry to get on now, pushing post-punk style through dystopian, jittery landscapes of romantic disconnection." Crackle Feedback gave the album an 8 out of 10 rating, finalising that "Attempting to replace sledgehammer guitar noise with glacial synth is in no way detrimental to this album, it is a new and different approach which, whilst making no obvious attempt to develop on previous styles, adds to their canon an album which contrasts well with its predecessors and shows refreshing imagination." London based entertainment website London24 awarded the album four stars, and called the album "taut, sparse, ominous and occasionally threatening – in the best and most evocative sense."

The Skinny voted the album as the #9 best album of 2012. In an accompanying interview, James Graham stated that, "No One Can Ever Know has opened the door to so many ideas and things we can do musically. ... Our fourth album will be very important in deciding the future of this band." The album was also shortlisted for the Scottish Album of the Year Award.

== Track listing ==
All tracks are written by Andy MacFarlane (music) and James Graham (lyrics).

No.	Title	Length
1.	"Alphabet"	4:27
2.	"Dead City"	6:26
3.	"Sick"	4:24
4.	"Don't Move"	4:20
5.	"Nil"	5:19
6.	"Don't Look at Me"	4:09
7.	"Not Sleeping"	5:11
8.	"Another Bed"	4:39
9.	"Kill It in the Morning"	5:53

iTunes Bonus Track
No.	Title	Length
10.	"A Million Ignorants"	3:32

eMusic Bonus Track
No.	Title	Length
10.	"Tell Me When We're Having Fun"	5:48

== Credits ==
=== Musicians ===
- James Graham – vocals
- Andy MacFarlane – guitars
- Mark Devine – drums, programming

=== Production ===
Recording personnel

- The Twilight Sad – production
- James Graham – lyrics
- Andy MacFarlane – composition
- Andrew Weatherall – "anti-producer"
- Jim Anderson – engineering, mixing, additional production
- Tobin Jones – assistant engineering
- Joseph Rogers – assistant engineering
- Alan Douches – mastering (at West West Side Music)
- Lee A. Cohen – management (for Get Some Management)

=== Artwork ===
- DLT – design
- DLT and Daninski – illustrations

== No One Can Ever Know: The Remixes ==
No One Can Ever Know: The Remixes

Remix album by the Twilight Sad
- Released: 19 November 2012
- Genres: Post-punk revival, dark wave, industrial
- Length: 45:40
- Language: Scottish English
- Label: FatCat
- Producers: The Twilight Sad, Andrew Weatherall

The Twilight Sad chronology
No One Can Ever Know (2012)	No One Can Ever Know: The Remixes (2012)	No One Can Ever Know: Tour EP (2012)

Professional ratings
Aggregate scores
Source	Rating
Metacritic	(66/100)
Review scores
Source	Rating
AllMusic	3.5/5 stars
PopMatters	(6/10)
This Is Fake DIY	(8/10)

In November 2012, FatCat Records released No One Can Ever Know: The Remixes, a collection of remixes of songs from the album. The album features remixes from Liars, Com Truise, Tom Furse from The Horrors, and labelmates Breton. AllMusic reviewer Heather Phares praised the collection, saying "The Remixes is as well balanced as it is eclectic, finding room for tracks that clearly bear the stamp of their remixers, tracks that could fill a dancefloor, and tracks that push the limits of the Twilight Sad's sound even further. That the sequencing gives it a more satisfying flow than many similar sets is a nice bonus, and one that underscores how fitting it is that a collection like this from a band as searching as the Twilight Sad explores what remixes, and a remix album, can be."

== Remix album track listing ==
No.	Title	Length
1.	"Sick" (Brokenchord Remix)	3:35
2.	"Sick" (Com Truise Remix)	4:40
3.	"Nil" (Liars Remix)	7:46
4.	"Not Sleeping" (The Horrors Dub Mix)	6:56
5.	"Alphabet" (JD Twitch / Optimo Remix)	6:38
6.	"Not Sleeping" (Warsnare Remix)	3:54
7.	"Nil" (bretonLABS Remix)	3:27
8.	"Alphabet" (Ambassadeurs Remix)	4:17
9.	"Sick" (Brokenchord Remix 2)	4:31

=== Credits ===
- "Not Sleeping" (The Horrors Dub Mix) remix and additional production by Tom Furse
- "Nil" (bretonLABS Remix) remixed by Roman Rappak and Breton at bretonLABS London, 2012; traffic sample recorded in Geneva

== No One Can Ever Know: Tour EP ==
No One Can Ever Know: Tour EP

EP by the Twilight Sad
- Released: 19 November 2012
- Recorded: 2011–2012
- Genres: Post-punk revival, dark wave, industrial
- Length: 25:53
- Language: Scottish English
- Label: Self-released
- Producer: The Twilight Sad

The Twilight Sad chronology
No One Can Ever Know: The Remixes (2012)	No One Can Ever Know: Tour EP (2012)

Following the release of No One Can Ever Know: The Remixes, The Twilight Sad announced the release of the limited edition No One Can Ever Know: Tour EP (stylised as N/O/C/E/K Tour EP). The EP features a new song titled "Idiots" as well as alternate versions of tracks from the album, plus the B-sides "Untitled #67" and "A Million Ignorants". The EP was made available as a digital download included with all orders from the band's webstore, and also as a special handmade CD-R inside a custom-printed cardboard sleeve. The CD-R version was limited to 300 copies and was only available at the band's European shows.

== Tour EP track listing ==
No.	Title	Length
1.	"Idiots" (Demo)	4:16
2.	"Alphabet" (Alternate Version)	4:08
3.	"Not Sleeping" (Alternate Version)	5:18
4.	"Untitled #67"	3:53
5.	"Another Bed" (Alternate Version)	4:52
6.	"A Million Ignorants"	3:33

== Release history ==
Country	Date	Label	Format	Catalogue #	Notes
United Kingdom	6 February 2012	FatCat Records	CD, LP	FATCD98; FATLP98	
United Kingdom	6 February 2012	FatCat Records	2LP	FATLP98LTD	Limited 2LP on heavyweight vinyl
United States	7 February 2012	FatCat Records	CD, LP	FATCD98; FATLP98	
United States	7 February 2012	FatCat Records	LP (clear vinyl)	FATLP98	Limited edition of 100, available exclusively from the band's webstore
United Kingdom	19 November 2012	FatCat Records	CD; LP	FATCD99; FATLP99	No One Can Ever Know: The Remixes
United States	19 November 2012	FatCat Records	CD	FATCD99	No One Can Ever Know: The Remixes
