= Nobody Wants to Be Here and Nobody Wants to Leave =

Studio album by the Twilight Sad
- Released: 27 October 2014
- Recorded: Early 2014
- Studios: Castle of Doom Studios, Glasgow
- Genres: Post-punk revival, indie rock
- Length: 43:31
- Language: Scottish English
- Label: FatCat
- Producer: Andy MacFarlane

The Twilight Sad chronology
No One Can Ever Know (2012)	Nobody Wants to Be Here and Nobody Wants to Leave (2014)	Òran Mór Session (2015)

Singles from Nobody Wants to Be Here and Nobody Wants to Leave
- 1. "Last January" Released: 15 September 2014; 2. "I Could Give You All That You Don't Want" Released: 9 February 2015; 3. "It Never Was the Same" Released: 29 June 2015

Nobody Wants to Be Here and Nobody Wants to Leave is the fourth studio album by Scottish indie rock band the Twilight Sad, released on 27 October 2014 on FatCat Records. Produced by guitarist and multi-instrumentalist Andy MacFarlane, the album is the band's last to feature founding drummer Mark Devine and its first to feature longtime touring member Johnny Docherty on bass guitar. The album was mixed by Peter Katis, who had previously worked with the band on their debut album, Fourteen Autumns & Fifteen Winters (2007).

The album was released to positive reviews, with AllMusic summarising the album as "some of their most compelling music. By blending the extremes of their previous albums, they give intimate moments an epic scope in ways that sound truly revitalized... Equally desolate and majestic, Nobody Wants to Be Here and Nobody Wants to Leave's naked emotions and sophisticated music mark a new high point for the Twilight Sad."

== Background ==
In an interview with Contactmusic.com, guitarist/producer Andy MacFarlane explained that with Nobody Wants to Be Here and Nobody Wants to Leave, the band aimed to capture all the different forms their music has taken over the years, from "full on noise/feedback, to a sparse, synth led sound, to a stripped back set up with just keys, drum machine and guitar, to playing with an orchestra, and to just an acoustic with vocal." The album was produced at Mogwai's Castle of Doom Studios in Glasgow, and engineered by live soundman Andrew Bush. The album was mixed by Peter Katis, who also mixed the band's debut album Fourteen Autumns & Fifteen Winters, and The Twilight Sad's touring member Johnny Docherty played bass. Lead singer James Graham stated in the interview that, "We spent a lot of time at home when writing this new record, we got to hang out with old friends and get back to some sort of normality, which I think really helped me clear my mind and focus in on writing these new songs... I had a lot I wanted to get off my chest and I've done that with this new record."

Initially, Graham admitted to approaching the record as being the band's last album. He explained to The Skinny interviewer Jazz Monroe, "Since the start I've been an overthinker, but we went through a particularly rubbish year before writing these songs. Things weren't going too well for us, on numerous levels." In the same interview, MacFarlane added, "I loved doing the first two albums, but by the third, we were so run down and nothing was working out. At that point, we couldn't see beyond our next album." In an interview with independent music site GoldFlakePaint, Graham cited years of constant touring surrounding the album as a cause of strain for the band. "When you're constantly touring it can be really hard coming back because it's only ever for a wee bit and then you're away again. It's a weird frame of mind to be in. I definitely think I lost it a bit too; in that gap between the first and the fourth record", he stated. "The year preceding the writing of [the album] was tough ... We weren't working with the right people. It wasn't a good time for us. We were kind of questioning if we were going to do this again." Graham remarked that the recording process was uncomplicated, though, with he and MacFarlane working in unison and being "totally on the same page" with the album's direction. He added, "There's been a lot of faith shown in our band. There's Mogwai, how they've helped us out, and even bands like Frightened Rabbit, Chvrches – these people constantly talk about our music. We seem to be a band that bands like, but I genuinely think this record's a statement: not to prove people wrong, but to prove people right. ... I want to prove it to other people as well. I'm proud of all the records, but this one, although it keeps the same ethos, it can reach new people. I can categorically say these won't be the last songs I write. These songs, to me, proved I have a lot more to say. Writing these songs with Andy showed me how much I need this in my life. The thought of not doing it anymore terrifies me."

== Release ==
The band began working on tracks for the album in late 2012, and on 12 August 2014, the band announced the new album's release via their official website, Facebook, and Instagram pages. The announcement was accompanied by a 1-minute teaser video trailer on the band's website, followed by a posting of the album's opening track "There's a Girl in the Corner" on Vice magazine's Noisey blog on 18 August 2014. On 15 September 2014, the album's official first single "Last January" was made available as a digital download and was also posted for streaming on their website. The album's second single, "I Could Give You All That You Don't Want", was released on 9 February 2015 on 7" picture disc vinyl through the band's website; and third single "It Never Was the Same" was released on 7" vinyl on 29 June 2015. Additionally, a limited edition CD EP of acoustic versions of songs from the album, entitled Òran Mór Session, was made available at the band's 2014 and 2015 tour dates. The EP was expanded with additional tracks and given a wide commercial release in October 2015.

== Songs ==
In the interview with GoldFlakePaint, Graham notes closing track "Sometimes I Wished I Could Fall Asleep" as the song where the album began to come together for him. "That song opened it all up for me. I remember thinking 'we've got that now, that's going on the record no matter what,' and it always felt like the perfect closing statement." Musically, the song is a stripped-down piano track, while lyrically, Graham said that "when 'Fall Asleep' happened I suddenly knew what I wanted to say. I got it out of me. I think it's the most fucking 'out there' I've ever been. I usually use a lot of metaphors, but on that I didn't really do it, I just said it how it is. [...] Once I wrote it and listened to it back I did question if it was OK to do that. I've always put myself out there as a songwriter but it's always been hidden somewhat. I'm glad I chose not to be for once though, because it really kick-started the whole album for me." He also cites "It Never Was the Same" and the title track as two songs that "explain the whole theme of the record", and that those songs especially made the band feel confident in the album's direction.

Opening track "There's a Girl in the Corner" was posted for streaming on Vice magazine's Noisey blog on 18 August 2014, and the album's first single "Last January" was made available as a digital download on 15 September 2014. "Last January" has received positive reviews from critics; Pretty Much Amazing describes the song as "chilly [and] cinematic", stating that, "It's a little early in the autumn to start accruing driving-in-the-snow moody jams, but we're not complaining when they're this good", while Consequence of Sound says the song "captures the album's theme of 'small town weirdness and romance' with a post-punk gusto that hits hard sonically while tugging at the ol' heartstrings." A music video was produced for "Last January", directed by frequent collaborator Nicola Collins.

The album's second single, "I Could Give You All That You Don't Want", was released on 9 February 2015. The single was made available as a limited edition 7" picture disc vinyl with the exclusive double A-side track "The Airport". In an interview with The Line of Best Fit, Andy MacFarlane said that "The Airport" was recorded during the album sessions "with full intention of it being on the album." He continued, "It always sounded like a continuation of 'Seven Years of Letters' to me... Unfortunately, when we were deciding on the running order of the new album we couldn't find the right place for it to fit. So we're releasing it now. We wanted to highlight its release by putting it on a picture disc with new artwork by DLT." A music video for "I Could Give You All That You Don't Want", also directed by Nicola Collins, premiered on Brooklyn Vegan's website on 10 February 2015.

On 7 April 2015, the band announced that "It Never Was the Same" would be the album's third single, released on 29 June 2015. The single was released as a double A-side on white-coloured 7" vinyl, with the exclusive track "There's a Girl in the Corner" as covered by Robert Smith of The Cure. A music video for "It Never Was the Same", directed by Hand Held Cine Club, premiered on Drowned in Sound on 12 May 2015.

== Critical reception ==
Professional ratings
Aggregate scores
Source	Rating
Metacritic	(80/100)
Review scores
Source	Rating
AllMusic	4/5 stars
Clash	(8/10)
MusicOMH	3.5/5 stars
Paste Magazine	(8.4/10)
Pitchfork	(5.8/10)
PopMatters	(8/10)
Q	4/5 stars
The Quietus	(very favourable)
The Skinny	5/5 stars
Tiny Mix Tapes	3.5/5 stars

Nobody Wants to Be Here and Nobody Wants to Leave was released to critical acclaim. At Metacritic, which assigns a normalised rating out of 100 based on reviews from mainstream critics, the album has received a score of 80, based on 19 reviews. In an early review, Clash magazine called the album "an enthralling return" and "a marvelous new set that only develops its makers' already enviable reputation." London-based website The 405 gave the album an 8 out of 10 rating, saying "This fourth album comes across as a consolidation of the edgy noise of their early records and the electronic aspects of its predecessor. They sound as powerful as ever, and their penchant for weaving subtle folk melodies amongst their noise is still pretty special. Nobody Wants to Be Here and Nobody Wants to Leave is a highpoint for the Twilight Sad and in many ways it is the best record they've made to date."

Drowned in Sound gave the album a 10 out of 10 rating and awarded it with the #1 spot on the subsequent best album of the year list, praising "the jaw-dropping brilliance of the album" and hailing it as "a 40-minute body of work with a sense of cohesiveness that isn't designed to be broken down into Spotify playlists or end-of-year 'best of 2014' mixtapes." The Skinny gave the album a rating of 5 out of 5 stars, concluding that, "Like predecessor No One Can Ever Know, the album buries dark treasures in bleak haze, a sequence of gentle revelations that emerge with shyness but linger indefinitely... A miserable success." British independent magazine Artrocker also gave the album 5 stars and tagged it as their "album of the week," hailing the record as "dark, emotionally raw [and] beautiful," furthering that "They've produced a record that will only reiterate the fact that they're one of the most consistent Scottish bands around."

=== Accolades ===
On 7 December 2014, The Scotsman hailed Nobody Wants to Be Here and Nobody Wants to Leave as the best Scottish album of the year, with the band emerging as "the most-lauded act in the survey, which was based on review ratings in newspapers, magazines and online internationally over the past 12 months" with an overall score of 8.23 out of 10. On 11 December 2014, the album was named #1 on Drowned in Sound's "50 Favourite Albums of 2014" list. The Skinny voted the album at #2 on their list of "The Albums of 2014," declaring that the band have "recovered from 'tough times' and delivered their finest album to date." On their list of "The Best Indie Rock of 2014," PopMatters voted the album at #3.

The album was longlisted for the Scottish Album of the Year Award, following on the heels of the shortlisting of No One Can Ever Know two years previously.

== Track listing ==
All tracks are written by James Alexander Graham (lyrics) and Andy MacFarlane (music).

No.	Title	Length
1.	"There's a Girl in the Corner"	3:50
2.	"Last January"	5:11
3.	"I Could Give You All That You Don't Want"	4:17
4.	"It Never Was the Same"	5:01
5.	"Drown So I Can Watch"	3:16
6.	"In Nowheres"	5:24
7.	"Nobody Wants to Be Here and Nobody Wants to Leave"	4:08
8.	"Pills I Swallow"	4:01
9.	"Leave the House"	4:31
10.	"Sometimes I Wished I Could Fall Asleep"	3:52

== Credits ==
=== Musicians ===
- James Alexander Graham – vocals
- Andy MacFarlane – guitars
- Mark Devine – drums
- Johnny Docherty – bass
- Mike Truscott – cornet on "Nobody Wants to Be Here and Nobody Wants to Leave"

=== Production ===
Recording personnel

- Andy MacFarlane – production, composition
- Peter Katis – mixing, additional production
- Andrew Bush – engineering, additional production

Artwork

- DLT – artwork and design
- James Alexander Graham – lyrics

== Release history ==
Country	Date	Label	Format	Catalogue #
Worldwide	27 October 2014	FatCat Records	CD, LP	FATCD132; FATLP132
United Kingdom	30 November 2018	FatCat Records	LP (clear-coloured vinyl)	FATLP132
