= Forget the Night Ahead =

Studio album by the Twilight Sad
- Released: 22 September 2009
- Recorded: Chem19 Studios, Hamilton, South Lanarkshire, Scotland
- Genres: Indie rock, shoegaze
- Length: 49:14
- Language: Scottish English
- Label: FatCat
- Producers: Andy MacFarlane, Paul Savage

The Twilight Sad chronology
Killed My Parents and Hit the Road (2008)	Forget the Night Ahead (2009)	The Wrong Car (2010)

Singles from Forget the Night Ahead
- 1. "I Became a Prostitute" Released: 3 August 2009; 2. "Seven Years of Letters" Released: 19 October 2009; 3. "The Room" Released: 5 April 2010

Forget the Night Ahead is the second studio album by Scottish indie rock band the Twilight Sad, released by FatCat Records on 22 September 2009 in the US, and on 5 October 2009 in the UK. The album was produced by guitarist Andy MacFarlane and recorded and mixed by Paul Savage at Chem19 Studios in Hamilton, South Lanarkshire, Scotland. The album features the singles "I Became a Prostitute", "Seven Years of Letters", and "The Room".

The album is the last to feature bassist Craig Orzel, who subsequently left the band in early 2010. The recording sessions for Forget the Night Ahead also yielded the EP The Wrong Car, which followed the album in September 2010.

== Background and recording ==
The band entered the studio in January 2009 to begin recording new songs. At this time, vocalist James Graham told The Skinny, "The band had definitely moved on from Fourteen Autumns & Fifteen Winters, musically and lyrically. One thing that I can promise is that the lyrics are very dark, but you might have to look into them a bit to realise. They are mainly based around things that have happened to me over the past two years, revolving mainly around losing people and being none too proud or happy with myself about my antics and situations I've found myself in. So if you're looking for a record with a lot of hope and happy songs then fuck off, 'cause you won't find it here with us! Maybe on the third album when we all have coke and heroin addictions things will start to look a bit brighter!"

The lyrics for the album were written during a two-month period after a close family member of Graham's died. "I didn't handle it very well at all, I started drinking far too much," said Graham in an interview with Planet Sound.

About the recording process, guitarist and producer Andy MacFarlane said, "The recording was approached differently this time. We made a point of staying home to write. Writing on tour is a bad idea, so we stayed in Scotland for the full process. It let us go home after sessions – if we weren't getting snowed-in the studio – and we had more time to experiment and develop the ideas we had. We'd make a lot of use of an old, half-working, Roland Space Echo that we'd plug the vocals, noise strings and piano through, that would get an out-of-tune effect, like some of the early krautrock recordings. All the reverbs are natural, which were done by mic'ing up inside the studio walls and rooms on the other side of the building to get the drum sound. Three bass heads were blown up [in the process]. There are no big, long delayed guitars, just a lot more noisy ones and there were a few songs that maxed out the desk because of the amount that's on there!"

About the different production style, Graham said, "We didn't want a polished pop record. The music just didn't lend itself to that style. Peter Katis did a great job mixing the first record, but we didn't want to repeat the sound. It's not being deliberately contrary to go darker, it's a broader record too."

The album features a guest appearance by My Latest Novel's Laura McFarlane, who plays violin on "The Room" and "That Birthday Present". She had previously collaborated with the band on the EP Here, It Never Snowed. Afterwards It Did. The album's title comes from a lyric in the song "Made to Disappear".

== Singles and tracks ==
On 13 May 2009, "Reflection of the Television" premiered as a free download on Pitchfork.com. On 3 August 2009, "I Became a Prostitute" was released as the first single in the UK. The video premiered on 3 July 2009 on The Line of Best Fit's website. The album's second single was "Seven Years of Letters", released on 19 October 2009, and "The Room" was released as the third single on 5 April 2010.

"Made to Disappear" features the album title in its lyrics. Graham said, "The album title is autobiographical. It got to the stage where I just wanted each to day to end as quickly as it could, and I'd get drunk so I wouldn't have to face the night's reality."

"The Neighbours Can't Breathe" first appeared as a live version on the 2008 compilation Killed My Parents and Hit the Road, under the title of "Untitled #28". It's the band's first song to have its title taken from a line of its lyrics. An acoustic version of "The Room" was also included on the same compilation, with the title of "Untitled #27".

In September 2009, The Skinny published a track-by-track recount by guitarist Andy MacFarlane that included notes about the writing and recording process, as well as the inspiration behind some of the song titles.

== Critical reception ==
Professional ratings
Aggregate scores
Source	Rating
Metacritic	(71/100)
Review scores
Source	Rating
AllMusic	4/5 stars
The A.V. Club	(B+)
BBC	(very favourable)
Drowned in Sound	(7/10)
The Guardian	3/5 stars
NME	(7/10)
Pitchfork	(7.3/10)
PopMatters	(6/10)
The Skinny	4/5 stars
Tiny Mix Tapes	3.5/5 stars

Forget the Night Ahead was released to generally positive reviews. At Metacritic, which assigns a normalized rating out of 100 based on reviews from mainstream critics, the album has received a favourable score of 71, based on 18 reviews. Mojo awarded the album 4 out of 5 stars, while The Onion's A.V. Club stated the album "show[s] a band capable of muscling up without losing a fascination with fragile, fleeting moments."

== Track listing ==
All tracks are written by Andy MacFarlane (music) and James Graham (lyrics).

No.	Title	Length
1.	"Reflection of the Television"	4:58
2.	"I Became a Prostitute"	5:20
3.	"Seven Years of Letters"	4:35
4.	"Made to Disappear"	4:53
5.	"Scissors"	3:16
6.	"The Room"	4:34
7.	"That Birthday Present"	5:03
8.	"Floorboards Under the Bed"	3:26
9.	"Interrupted"	4:00
10.	"The Neighbours Can't Breathe"	5:24
11.	"At the Burnside"	3:49

== Release history ==
Country	Date	Label	Format	Catalogue #
United States	22 September 2009	FatCat Records	CD; 2LP	FATCD77; FATLP77
United Kingdom	5 October 2009	FatCat Records	CD; 2LP	FATCD77; FATLP77

== Credits ==
The following people contributed to Forget the Night Ahead:

=== Musicians ===
The Twilight Sad

- James Graham – vocals, lyrics
- Andy MacFarlane – guitars, compositions
- Craig Orzel – bass
- Mark Devine – drums

Additional musicians

- Martin Doherty – "noise strings"
- Laura McFarlane – violin on "The Room" and "That Birthday Present"

=== Production ===
Recording personnel

- Andy MacFarlane – producer
- Paul Savage – co-producer, recording, mixing
- Mark Devine – co-producer
- Alan Douches – mastering (at West West Side Music)

=== Artwork ===
- dlt – artwork
