= Òran Mór =

Theatre, restaurant, entertainment and music venue in Glasgow

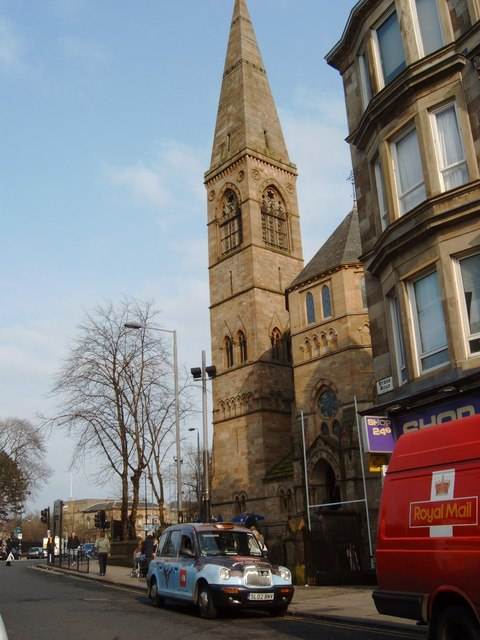
- Òran Mór in 2007
- Interactive map of Òran Mór
- Address: Scotland
- Location: Glasgow
- Coordinates: 55°52′40″N 4°17′23″W

Construction
- Architect: J. J. Stevenson

Website
- Òran Mór Website

Òran Mór (Scottish Gaelic: "great melody of life" or "big song") is a theatre, restaurant, entertainment and music venue in Glasgow. From 1862 until 1978, the building served as the Kelvinside Parish Church (Botanic Gardens) before becoming redundant. It was deconsecrated and converted into an entertainment venue in 2004.

== History ==
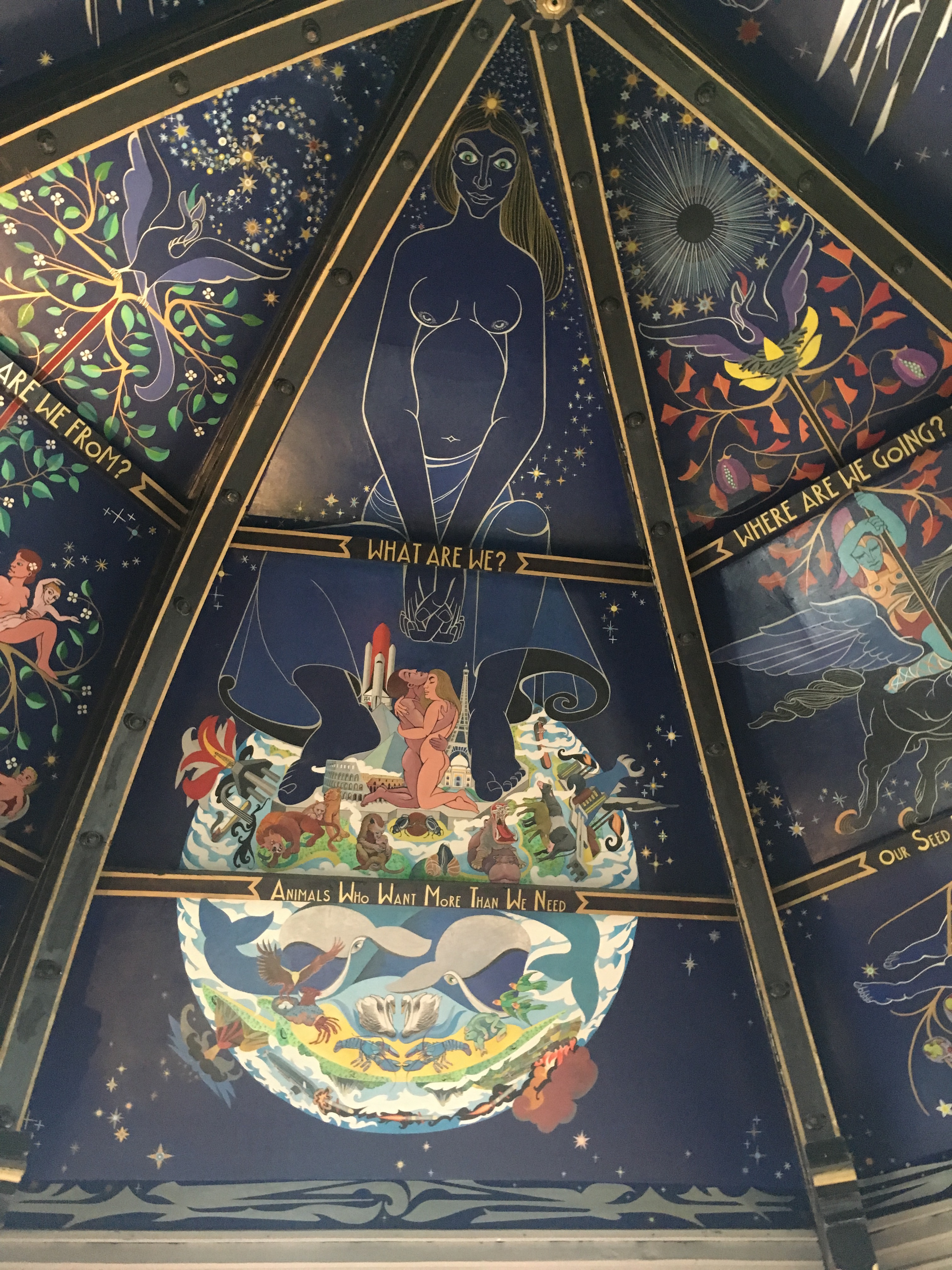
Murals by Alasdair Gray, added during the 2004 conversion

The building was founded as the Kelvinside Free Church, as a parish church of the Free Church of Scotland. The foundation stone was laid on 4 September 1862, and the church was built in the Neo-Gothic style, on designs by J. J. Stevenson. A spire was built in an Italian Gothic Pyramid style. After the Free Church of Scotland joined the United Presbyterian Church in 1900 to form the United Free Church of Scotland, the church was renamed the Kelvinside United Free Church.

The name was once more changed when the United Free Church of Scotland merged into the Church of Scotland, becoming Kelvinside Parish Church in 1929. Between 1929 and 1978, the church served as a Parish church of the Church of Scotland. By the late 1970s, the congregation had dwindled and in 1978, it was decided to merge Kelvinside Parish Church with Hillhead Parish Church, and retaining the use of the latter building for worship. Consequently, the former Kelvinside Parish Church became redundant and derelict.

In 2002, works commenced to refurbish the building and turn it into an arts and leisure centre, with it being renamed Òran Mór. The building was opened in June 2004. The building appeared in The Amazing Race in 2022, and was the venue for the memorial service for actor and musicologist Derek Watson.
