= Errors (band) =

Scottish post-electro band

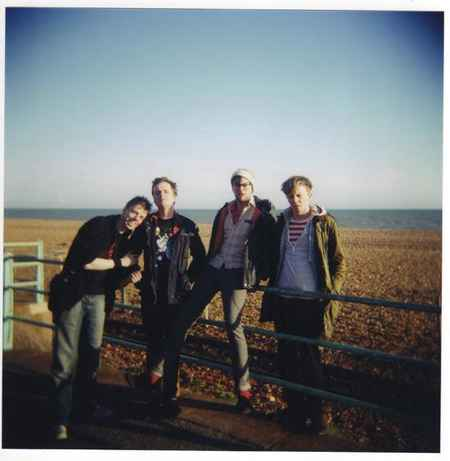
- Errors in 2010. From left to right: James Hamilton, Greg Paterson, Stephen Livingstone, Simon Ward

Background information
- Origin: Glasgow, Scotland
- Genre: Electronic
- Years active: 2004–present
- Label: Rock Action
- Members: Simon Ward; Stephen Livingstone; James Hamilton
- Past members: Greg Paterson
- Website: weareerrors.com

Errors are a three-piece post-electro band from Glasgow, Scotland. They are signed to Rock Action Records, a Scottish independent record label founded and managed by the band Mogwai.

== History ==
Errors formed as a bedroom electronic-based project in Glasgow in 2004 by members Simon Ward, Greg Paterson and Stephen Livingstone. They were signed by Post-Rock band Mogwai to their Rock Action Records imprint, who released a limited run 7" single "Hans Herman".

The band followed up their debut with the How Clean is Your Acid House? EP in 2006. Following the release of the EP, the band promoted former Multiplies and Dananananaykroyd drummer James Hamilton, who had performed with them on stage, to a full-time member. In summer 2007, they supported the electronic band Underworld on their UK tour.

Their debut album It's Not Something But It Is Like Whatever was released on Rock Action records in June 2008. Comparisons to the American rock band Battles among others were noted. The band toured throughout 2008 with Forward Russia, 65daysofstatic and Mogwai and continued touring into early 2009 in Europe. They played at the Eurosonic festival and supported Mogwai and Danish electro-rock band Whomadewho on their tours.

In 2010, the band released their second full-length album Come Down With Me on Rock Action records, the title of which is a play on Channel 4 television series 'Come Dine with Me.' They spent the spring and summer touring throughout the UK and Europe. In October, Errors toured the UK as co-headline act with Scottish post-punk group, The Twilight Sad and released a remix album titled 'Celebrity Come Down With Me', featuring remixes of tracks off their previous album by Gold Panda and Ceephax Acid Crew among others.

In March 2011, Errors were invited to perform at the South By Southwest festival and in April and May. They toured the US and Canada supporting Mogwai, during which drummer James Hamilton filled in on drums for the headliners. In December, Errors supported Mogwai at Glasgow's Barrowlands. After which Greg Paterson, founding member and guitarist, left the group. However, Paterson would later re-join the band onstage one final time at a secret show in their native Glasgow in 2013, the band's only live date during a year-long hiatus.

In 2012, the band released two albums, Have Some Faith in Magic on January 30, 2012, and New Relic which was released on a limited-edition VHS cassette on October 1, 2012, and toured in the UK, Europe and North America.

In 2014, the band played their first shows in Japan, supporting fellow Glaswegians Chvrches and playing the Hostess Club Weekender in Tokyo. and began work on their fourth full-length studio album "Lease of Life" which was released on 23 March 2015.

== Band members ==
=== Current members ===
- Simon Ward – guitars, keyboards, programming (2004–present)
- Stephen Livingstone – vocals, guitars, keyboards, programming (2004–present)
- James Hamilton – drums (2006–present)

=== Former members ===
- Greg Paterson – guitars, keyboards, vocals (2004–2011)

Collaborative members

- George Pringle – vocals
- Bek Olivia – vocals
- Cecilia Stamp – vocals

== Discography ==
=== Albums ===
- It's Not Something But It Is Like Whatever (2008)
- Come Down With Me (2010)
- Have Some Faith in Magic (2012)
- New Relics (2012)
- Lease of Life (2015)

=== EPs ===
- How Clean is Your Acid House? (2006)
- Celebrity Come Down With Me (2010)

=== Singles ===
- "Hans Herman" / "Ah-Ha-Ha" (2005)
- "H.E.B.S." / "Fly For" (Split 7" single with Findo Gask) (2005)
- "Salut! France" / "Maeve Binchy" (2007)
- "Toes" / "Period Drama" (2008)
- "Pump" (Edit) / "Toes" (Dolby Anol Remix) (2008)
- "A Rumour in Africa" / "Beat The Bookies" (2010)
- "Magna Encarta" / "Ganymede" (2011)
- "Pleasure Palaces" / "Auberchute Flyer" (2012)
