= Here, It Never Snowed. Afterwards It Did =

EP by the Twilight Sad
- Released: 9 June 2008
- Studio: Alucard Studios
- Genre: Indie rock
- Length: 30:38
- Language: Scottish English
- Label: FatCat
- Producer: Andy MacFarlane

The Twilight Sad chronology
| Fourteen Autumns & Fifteen Winters (2007) | Here, It Never Snowed. Afterwards It Did (2008) | Killed My Parents and Hit the Road (2008) |

Professional ratings
Review scores
| Source | Rating |
|---|---|
| AllMusic | 4/5 stars |
| Clash | 8/10 |
| Drowned in Sound | 8/10 |
| Pitchfork | 7.9/10 |
| The Skinny | 4/5 stars |
| Twisted Ear | 3.5/5 stars |

Here, It Never Snowed. Afterwards It Did is a mini-album by Scottish indie rock band the Twilight Sad, released on 9 June 2008. At an acoustic performance promoting the record, singer James Graham noted that the band could have released another single from Fourteen Autumns & Fifteen Winters but ultimately decided to release a fresh batch of recordings instead.

== Background ==
The record includes four alternative versions of tracks taken from their debut album, Fourteen Autumns & Fifteen Winters, and two new songs: a cover of Daniel Johnston's "Some Things Last a Long Time" and the title track, "Here It Never Snowed. Afterwards It Did," a song written for their first album but never used.

Concerning the re-recording of older material, guitarist Andy MacFarlane explained:

We wanted to record reworked versions of some songs, as we felt there was another side to some of them that worked just as well as the originals. The idea came about from playing certain gigs or sessions with a more basic line-up of just fan organ, glockenspiel and percussion. We developed that sound in the recordings by plugging the fan organ through effects, adding guitars, drones, violins and experimenting with the alternate sound.

Former Aereogramme guitarist Iain Cook recorded, mixed and mastered the record, while former Aereogramme bassist Campbell McNeil plays on the opening track "And She Would Darken the Memory". Also, prior to the EP's release, former Aereogramme contributor Martin "Dok" Doherty joined the band during live performances, playing various instruments. Laura McFarlane, from My Latest Novel, plays violin on three tracks.

The song and mini-album's title is a reference to one of the last lines of dialogue in Tim Burton's 1990 film Edward Scissorhands.

== Track listing ==
All tracks are written by Andy MacFarlane and James Graham, except where noted.

| No. | Title | Writer(s) | Length |
|---|---|---|---|
| 1. | "And She Would Darken the Memory" | | 5:49 |
| 2. | "Cold Days from the Birdhouse" | | 6:05 |
| 3. | "Here, It Never Snowed. Afterwards It Did" | | 4:05 |
| 4. | "Mapped by What Surrounded Them" | | 3:59 |
| 5. | "Walking for Two Hours" | | 4:31 |
| 6. | "Some Things Last a Long Time" | Daniel Johnston, Jad Fair | 7:07 |

== Credits ==
- James Alexander Graham – vocals, lyrics
- Andy MacFarlane – guitar, fan organ, producer, mixing
- Mark Devine – drums, percussion, mixing
- Craig Orzel – bass, glockenspiel
- Iain Cook – engineer, mixing, mastering
- Laura McFarlane – violin on "And She Would Darken the Memory," "Walking for Two Hours," and "Some Things Last a Long Time"
- Campbell McNeil – bass on "And She Would Darken the Memory"
- dlt – artwork
