= That Summer, at Home I Had Become the Invisible Boy =

Single by The Twilight Sad

from the album Fourteen Autumns & Fifteen Winters
- B-side: "Watching That Chair Painted Yellow"
- Released: 16 April 2007
- Recorded: Chem19 Studios
- Genre: Indie rock, shoegazing
- Length: 4:48
- Label: Fat Cat (FAT29)
- Songwriter(s): James Graham, Andy MacFarlane
- Producer(s): The Twilight Sad

The Twilight Sad singles chronology
"That Summer, at Home I Had Become the Invisible Boy" (2007)	"And She Would Darken the Memory" (2007)

"That Summer, at Home I Had Become the Invisible Boy" is a song by Scottish indie rock band the Twilight Sad, that appears on the EP The Twilight Sad, and their debut album, Fourteen Autumns & Fifteen Winters. The song was released as the album's first single on 16 April 2007 on Fat Cat Records. The title is a reference to the film Stand by Me.

== Track listing ==
All tracks are written by Andy MacFarlane (music) and James Graham (lyrics).

No.	Title	Length
1.	"That Summer, at Home I Had Become the Invisible Boy"	4:48
2.	"Watching That Chair Painted Yellow"	5:31

== Credits ==
- James Alexander Graham – vocals
- Andy MacFarlane – guitar, accordion
- Craig Orzel – bass
- Mark Devine – drums
- Produced by The Twilight Sad
- "That Summer, at Home" recorded by David Paterson
- "Watching That Chair Painted Yellow" recorded by Paul Savage
- Mixed by Peter Katis
- Mastered by Jesse Baccus and Alan Douches
- dlt – artwork
