= Rock Action Records =

Scottish record label

Rock Action Records is a Scottish, Glasgow-based independent record label, founded and maintained by Scottish band Mogwai. The label has showcased such diverse talents as Part Chimp, Errors, Chris Brokaw, Trout, The James Orr Complex and Kling Klang, has licensed music for UK release from Torche, Envy, Afrirampo and Growing, and in the past represented Papa M and The Zephyrs. As of 2010, Mogwai have released their own records on the label in the UK and Europe.

== Artist roster ==
Artists signed to Rock Action include:

- Bdrmm
- Blanck Mass
- De Rosa
- Desalvo
- Envy
- Errors
- Kathryn Joseph
- Aidan Moffat & RM Hubbert
- Mogwai
- Mugstar
- Part Chimp
- Remember Remember
- Sacred Paws
- Swervedriver
- The Twilight Sad
- Arab Strap

== Catalogue ==
rockact01 - Mogwai - "Tuner/Lower" 7"
rockact02 - Pilotcan - "Rusty Barker Learns to Fly" 7"
rockact03 - Trout - "Three Wise Men" 7"
rockact04 - Pilotcan - "Five Minutes on a Tuesday Night" 7"
rockact05 - Mogwai - Ten Rapid
rockact06 - The Zephyrs - Stargazer EP
rockact07 - Papa M - Papa M Sings
rockact08 - The James Orr Complex - Figa EP
rockact09 - Random Number - Fact That I Did EP
rockact10 - Mogwai - "My Father, My King"
rockact11 - Cex - Oops, I Did It Again
rockact12 - Part Chimp - Chart Pimp
rockact13 - Kling Klang - Superposition EP
rockact14 - Envy - A Dead Sinking Story
rockact15 - James Orr Complex - Chori's Bundle
rockact16 - Rock Action Records Presents Vol. 1
rockact17 - Part Chimp - Bring Back The Sound
rockact18 - Envy - All The Footprints...
rockact19 - Errors - "Hans Herman" 7"
rockact20 - Part Chimp - I Am Come
rockact21 - Kling Klang - Esthetik of Destruction
rockact22 - Part Chimp - War Machine
rockact23 - Errors - How Clean Is Your Acid House
rockact24 - Chris Brokaw - Incredible Love
rockact25 - Part Chimp - New Cross
rockact27 - Part Chimp/Lords/Todd/Hey Colossus 10"
rockact28 - Envy - Insomniac Doze
rockact29 - Growing - Color Wheel
rockact30 - Torche - Torche
rockact31 - Errors - Salut! France
rockact32 - Trout - EP 7"
rockact33 - Torche - In Return
rockact34 - Envy - Abyssal
rockact35 - Errors - "Toes"
rockact36 - Errors - It's Not Something But It Is Like Whatever
rockact37 - Rock Action Sampler Spring 2008
rockact38 - DeSalvo - Mood Poisoner
rockact39 - Envy - Transfovista DVD
rockact40 - James Orr Complex - Com Favo
rockact41 - Errors - "Pump" 7"
rockact42 - Remember Remember - s/t
rockact43 - Mogwai/Fuck Buttons - "Tour Single" 7"
rockact44 - Part Chimp -Trad EP
rockact45 - Part Chimp - Thriller
rockact46 - Remember Remember - "The Dancing" 7"
rockact47 - Errors - Come Down With Me
rockact48 - Mogwai - Special Moves
rockact49 - Errors - "A Rumour in Africa"
rockact50 - Errors - Celebrity Come Down With Me
rockact51 - Afrirampo - We are Ucho No Ko
rockact52 - Remember Remember - RR Scorpii EP
rockact53 - Envy - Recitation
rockact54 - Mogwai - "Mexican Grand Prix" 7"
rockact55 - Mogwai - Hardcore Will Never Die, But You Will
rockact56 - Errors - "Magna Encarta" 7"
rockact57 - Mogwai - "San Pedro" 7"
rockact58 - Blanck Mass - s/t
rockact59 - Mogwai - Earth Division EP rasc001 - DeSalvo - singles club 7"

== See also ==
- List of record labels
