= The Twilight Sad =

Scottish post-punk/indie rock band

- The Twilight Sad playing at Crystal Palace Bowl in August 2025. Left to right: MacFarlane, Graham, Nicholas Willes, Alex Mackay.

Background information
- Origin: Kilsyth, Lanarkshire, Scotland
- Genres: Post-punk; post-rock; industrial; gothic rock
- Years active: 2003–present
- Labels: FatCat; Rock Action
- Spinoffs: Out Lines; The Fruit Tree Foundation; Gentle Sinners
- Members: James Graham; Andy MacFarlane
- Past members: Mark Devine; Martin Doherty; Craig Orzel; Sebastian Schultz; Johnny Docherty; Brendan Smith; Grant Hutchison
- Website: The Twilight Sad

The Twilight Sad are a Scottish post-punk/indie rock band from Kilsyth, formed in 2003. The band is currently a duo consisting of founding members James Graham (vocals and lyrics) and Andy MacFarlane (guitar, instrumentation and music). They have released six studio albums, as well as several EPs, live recordings and singles.

Founded by Graham, MacFarlane, Craig Orzel (bass) and Mark Devine (drums), the band's 2007 debut album, Fourteen Autumns & Fifteen Winters, drew widespread acclaim from critics, who noted Graham's thick Scottish accent and MacFarlane's dense sonic walls of shoegaze guitar and wheezing accordion. The Twilight Sad's notoriously loud live performances have been described as "completely ear-splitting", and the band toured for the album across Europe and the United States throughout 2007 and 2008. Sessions inspired by stripped-down and reworked live performances yielded the 2008 mini-album, Here, It Never Snowed. Afterwards It Did.

The band's second album, Forget the Night Ahead, marked a shift in their direction; lyrically more personal and musically darker and more streamlined, it was released in 2009 to acclaim. Recording sessions for the album also produced the mid-2010 release The Wrong Car, which followed the departure of founding bassist Craig Orzel in February 2010. The Twilight Sad's third album, No One Can Ever Know, was released in February 2012 and marked another stylistic shift, with the band citing industrial music and krautrock influences for a darker, sparser sound. The band's fourth album, entitled Nobody Wants to Be Here and Nobody Wants to Leave, was released in late October 2014 to universally positive reviews, and was the band's last album with founding member Mark Devine, who left amicably in January 2018. The Twilight Sad's fifth studio album, It Won/t Be Like This All the Time, was released in January 2019 to further critical acclaim. In 2025, the band became a duo, consisting of core songwriters Graham and MacFarlane; they subsequently announced their sixth studio album, It's the Long Goodbye, which was released to unanimous praise on 27 March 2026.

The band has described their sound as "folk with layers of noise", and music critics have described the band as "perennially unhappy" and "a band that inject some real emotion and dynamic excitement into a comparatively standard template."

== History ==
=== 2003–2006: Beginnings ===
The foundation for the group started in Kilsyth and the neighbouring village of Banton, when vocalist James Graham met guitarist Andy MacFarlane in high school and went on to form a cover band with some friends, which included drummer Mark Devine. After leaving school, they decided to take it more seriously. In late 2003, MacFarlane met bassist Craig Orzel in a bus stop and invited him to join the newly formed band. They took their name from a line in the poem "But I Was Looking at the Permanent Stars" by British poet Wilfred Owen, which reads "Sleep mothered them; and left the twilight sad."

They performed two highly experimental shows at The 13th Note Café in Glasgow that revolved around 30-minute noise jams with guitars, bass, drums, theremin, tape loops from films and old folk and country songs, effects pedals, toy keyboards, thumb pianos, and computer games. Afterwards, they decided to take a more traditional approach, which led them to write their first song, "That Summer, at Home I Had Become the Invisible Boy".

In September 2006, they produced a 4-song demo with a 24-track desk recorded at Paulshalls Studios in Cumbernauld recorded by David McKellar, trying to get the best representation as possible, and sent it over to Brighton-based FatCat Records. Alex Knight, co-founder of the label, went to Glasgow to watch the band perform their third gig and signed them on the spot. The demo recordings were later issued commercially on a split cassette tape release with Frightened Rabbit for Record Store Day in 2011.

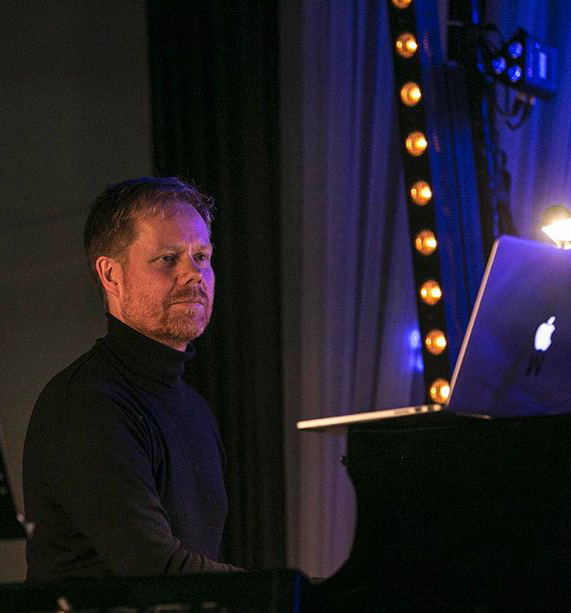
British composer and former FatCat Records labelmate Max Richter (pictured here in 2015) mixed the band's debut EP in 2006.

The band credit Planet Sound for giving them their first review, when a demo of their song "That Summer, at Home I Had Become the Invisible Boy" received a 9/10 rating from the magazine in 2005. James Graham remarked, "That was the first review we ever had... we were thrilled. It gave us a lot of confidence we were on the right path." The band's first commercial release, their self-titled EP, was mixed by label mate Max Richter and released in November 2006 in the United States only. They then proceeded to play the fourth gig of their career at New York's CMJ Music Marathon. During this time the band also toured with Micah P. Hinson and participated in 2007's South by Southwest music festival before their debut album was released.

=== 2007–2008: Fourteen Autumns & Fifteen Winters ===
Their debut studio album, Fourteen Autumns & Fifteen Winters, was released in April 2007, featuring production from guitarist Andy MacFarlane and mixed by Peter Katis. The album was recorded over a short period of just three days, and the songs featured were the first ones the band had ever written. It received good critical reception from independent media; the album was lauded as 2007's "Album of the Year" in Planet Sound and The Skinny in Scotland.

In July 2007, the band contributed a cover of Radiohead's "Climbing Up the Walls" to the download-only compilation Stereogum Presents... OKX: A Tribute to OK Computer, a track-for-track collection of covers commemorating the 10th anniversary of Radiohead's OK Computer album.

Inspired by a stripped down performance at London's Union Chapel, the band reworked some of the songs on Fourteen Autumns & Fifteen Winters for a new mini-album entitled Here, It Never Snowed. Afterwards It Did, released in June 2008.

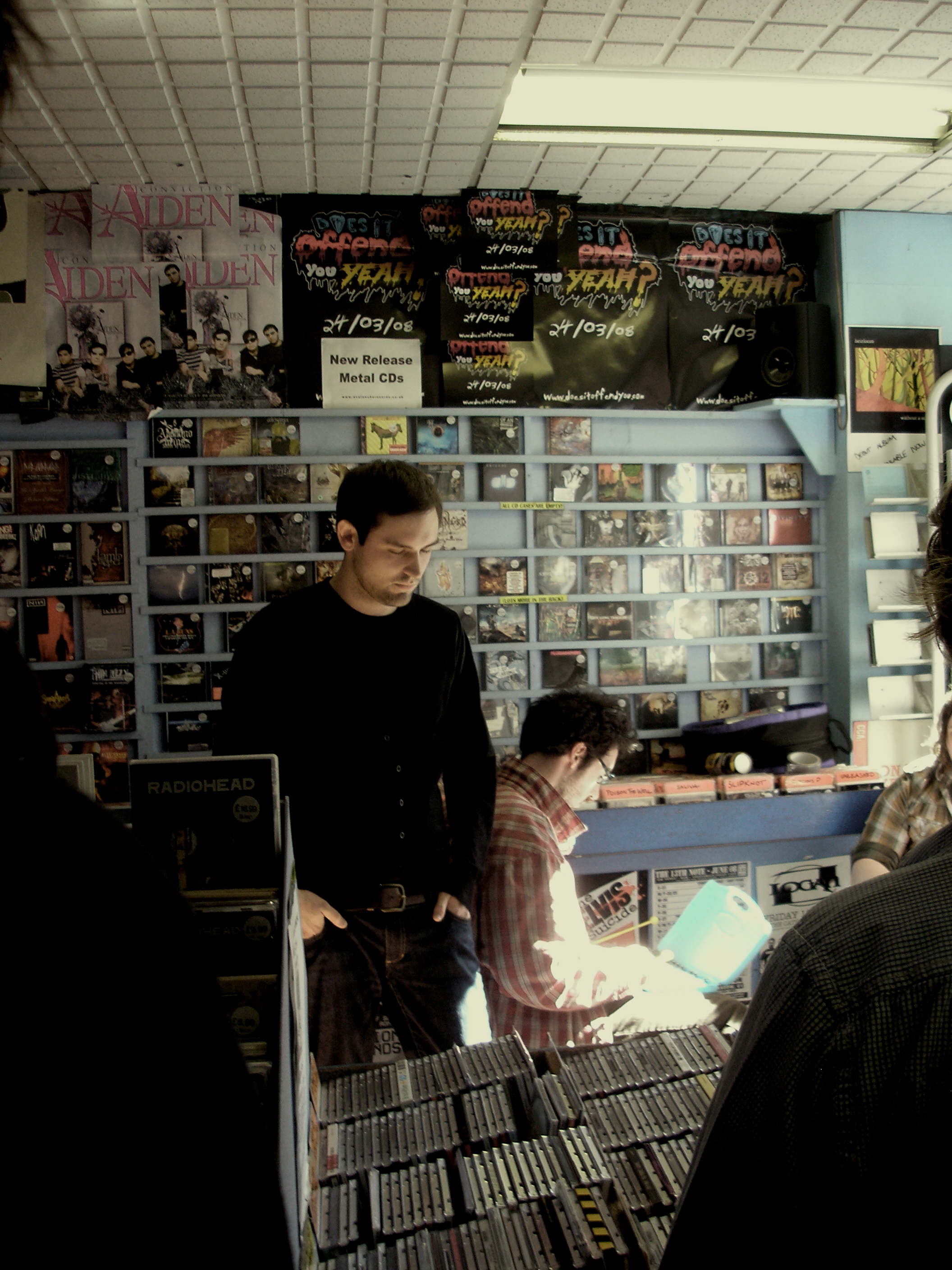
James Graham and former bassist Craig Orzel at Avalanche Records, June 2008.

During this time, the band supported acts such as Mogwai, The Smashing Pumpkins, Snow Patrol, David Pajo, Battles, Beirut, Frightened Rabbit, and Idlewild. During their winter tour with Mogwai, the band released Killed My Parents and Hit the Road, a compilation of live recordings, covers, acoustic demos, and unreleased material.

=== 2009–2010: Forget the Night Ahead and Orzel's departure ===
The band released their second studio album, Forget the Night Ahead, in September 2009. Musically, they described the album as "noisier and bigger", where they experimented with a lot of instruments and different sounds, including fire extinguishers. The album was released to further critical acclaim, and was supported by multiple tours of Europe and the United States.

On 8 February 2010, it was announced that founding bassist Craig Orzel had left the band. With a statement on the band's official blog, Orzel cited personal reasons for the departure and later stated that "there were some changes I wanted to make to my life that I felt being in The Sad was allowing me to put off." Orzel continues to record music under his solo moniker, Orzelda. Following Orzel's departure, the band added Johnny Docherty, of Take a Worm for a Walk Week, to the band's live line-up.

The band's first release since Orzel's departure, an EP entitled The Wrong Car, was released in late September 2010. The EP features two previously unreleased songs which were written and recorded during the sessions for Forget the Night Ahead, as well as two remixes by Simon Ward of Errors and Stuart Braithwaite of Mogwai.

=== 2010–2012: No One Can Ever Know ===
Whilst on tour with Errors in October 2010, vocalist James Graham stated that "the next [album] is not going to be anything like the first two. [...] The wall of sound is kinda gone. Andy [MacFarlane]'s demos involve a lot of keyboards, and it's a lot more considered." Additional musician Martin "Dok" Doherty also stated that "the band who make the same record over and over don't have a very long career." The band returned to the studio in January 2011. In April 2011, the band released a free acoustic EP on their official blog. The release featured stripped-back renditions of tracks from both Forget the Night Ahead and The Wrong Car.

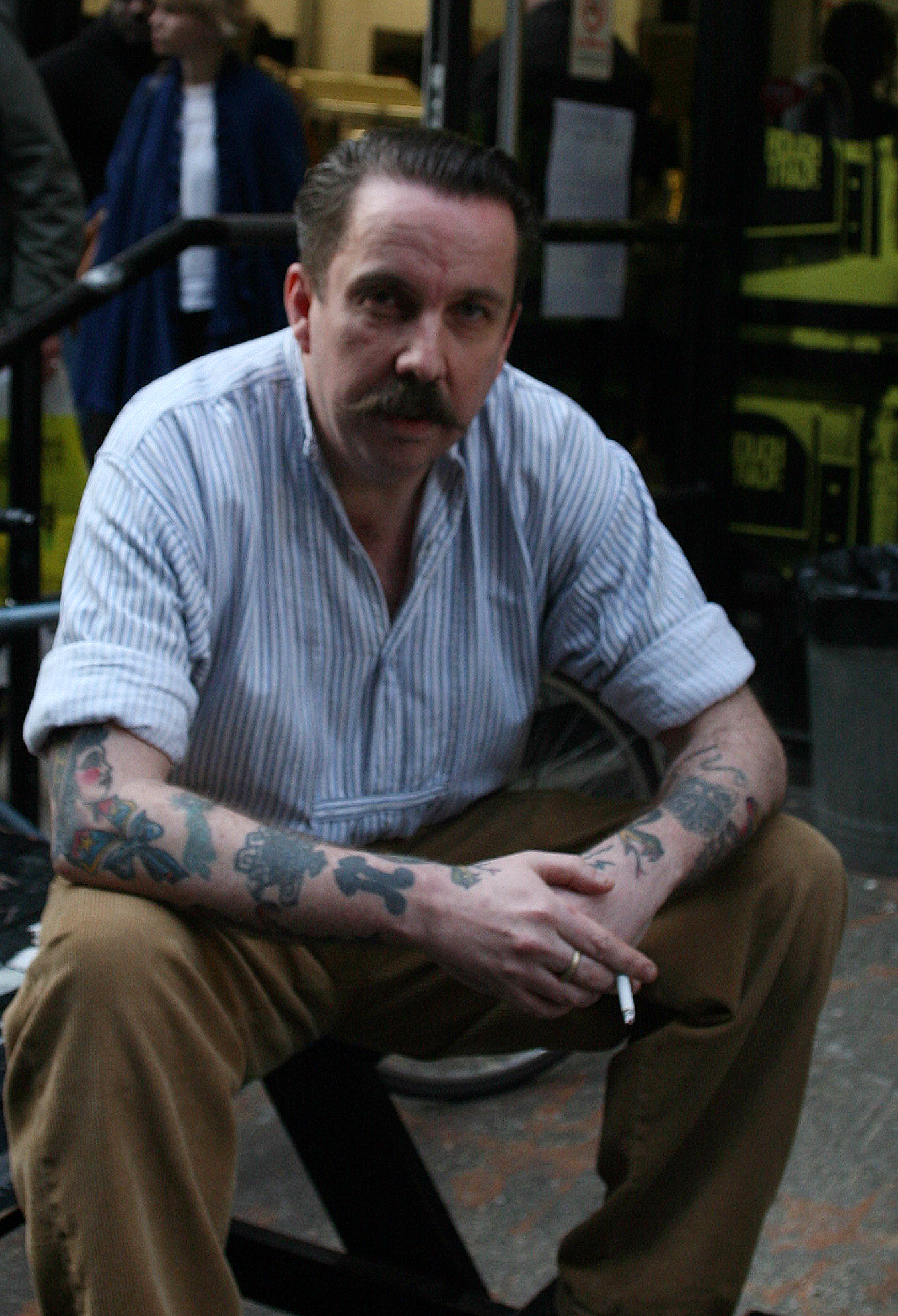
Andrew Weatherall, pictured here in 2009, aided the band with recording No One Can Ever Know, and was credited as "anti-producer".

The Twilight Sad's third album, No One Can Ever Know, was released on 6 February 2012. Andy MacFarlane describes the album's sound as "sparser... with a colder, slightly militant feel," and the band received some production assistance from producer Andrew Weatherall, who helped in their experimenting with analog synthesizers. The band released a new song, the album's closing track "Kill It in the Morning", for free on their new website and SoundCloud page on 21 September 2011. The first proper single from the album, "Sick", was made available as a 7" vinyl single and digital download on 14 November 2011. Second single "Another Bed" followed the album's release on 20 February 2012.

In August 2012, the band announced that touring keyboardist Martin "Dok" Doherty would no longer be performing with the band, stating "[An] end of an era as our next two gigs will be Dok's last with the band. One of our best friends and one of the most talented people we know! [...] Been a pleasure and a privilege to share the stage, be on the road [and] have many a drunken night in foreign lands over the past five years with you, Dok." Later that month, Doherty's replacement was revealed to be Brendan Smith, previously of the bands Julia Thirteen and The Unwinding Hours. Regarding the band's line-up changes over the past six years, James Graham noted, "The good thing about the line up changes is that we all remain friends with each other and when someone has left it's been for a good reason and the right choice for them. We've lucked out with Johnny [Docherty] and Brendan who are maniacs in the best possible way, but they are also brilliant musicians as were Dok and Craig [Orzel] and they all put the likes of me to shame." Doherty left the band to further pursue his electropop project Chvrches with former Aereogramme guitarist Iain Cook and singer Lauren Mayberry.

Along with nationwide tours of the United States and the United Kingdom, as well as European festivals during the summer and a headlining gig at Barrowland Ballroom in December, the band released a collection of remixes entitled No One Can Ever Know: The Remixes in November 2012. In December 2013, The Twilight Sad and The Skinny released a free digital download single and video of the band performing "The Wrong Car" with the Royal Scottish National Orchestra, recorded live at Paisley Abbey in October 2013.

=== 2013–2015: Nobody Wants to Be Here and Nobody Wants to Leave ===
The Twilight Sad performed their debut album Fourteen Autumns & Fifteen Winters in its entirety for the first time in December 2013, with further UK dates performing the full album in April and May 2014. The tour dates coincided with the release of a deluxe edition reissue of the debut album, with bonus tracks including demos and rarities, released on Record Store Day 2014.

The band began working on tracks for their fourth album in late 2012, with recording sessions at Mogwai's Castle of Doom Studios in Glasgow beginning in January 2014. On 12 August 2014, the band announced via their official website, Facebook, and Instagram pages that the new album, entitled Nobody Wants to Be Here and Nobody Wants to Leave, would be released on 27 October 2014. The announcement was accompanied by a 1-minute teaser video trailer on the band's website, followed by a posting of the album's opening track "There's a Girl in the Corner" on Vice magazine's Noisey blog on 18 August 2014. In an interview with Contactmusic.com, guitarist/producer Andy MacFarlane explained that with Nobody Wants to Be Here and Nobody Wants to Leave, the band aimed to capture all the different forms their music has taken over the years, from "full on noise/feedback, to a sparse, synth led sound, to a stripped back set up with just keys, drum machine and guitar, to playing with an orchestra, and to just an acoustic with vocal." The album produced three singles; the first single, "Last January", was released as a digital download on 15 September 2014; second single "I Could Give You All That You Don't Want" was released as a double A-side 7" vinyl single with the exclusive track "The Airport" on 9 February 2015; and third single "It Never Was the Same" was released on 29 June 2015 as a 7" vinyl single, featuring the exclusive version of "There's a Girl in the Corner" as covered by Robert Smith of The Cure. Additionally, a limited edition 6-song EP entitled Òran Mór Session, featuring stripped-down versions of songs from Nobody Wants to Be Here and Nobody Wants to Leave, was self-released by the band in October 2014, then expanded to 9 songs and given a wider release by FatCat Records in October 2015.

The band embarked on a North American tour supporting We Were Promised Jetpacks in October and November 2014, with two dates performing Fourteen Autumns & Fifteen Winters in its entirety at Rough Trade in New York City and The Empty Bottle in Chicago. The band toured the United Kingdom in December 2014 and January 2015, including a date performing at Edinburgh's Hogmanay Celebration on New Year's Eve, then returned to the United States in February/March 2015. Further tour dates across Europe and festival appearances followed throughout summer 2015, culminating with UK and European tour dates as the supporting act for Editors in October and November 2015, and a headlining performance at Barrowland Ballroom in mid-December.

=== 2016–2023: Touring with The Cure, change of drummers and It Won/t Be Like This All the Time ===
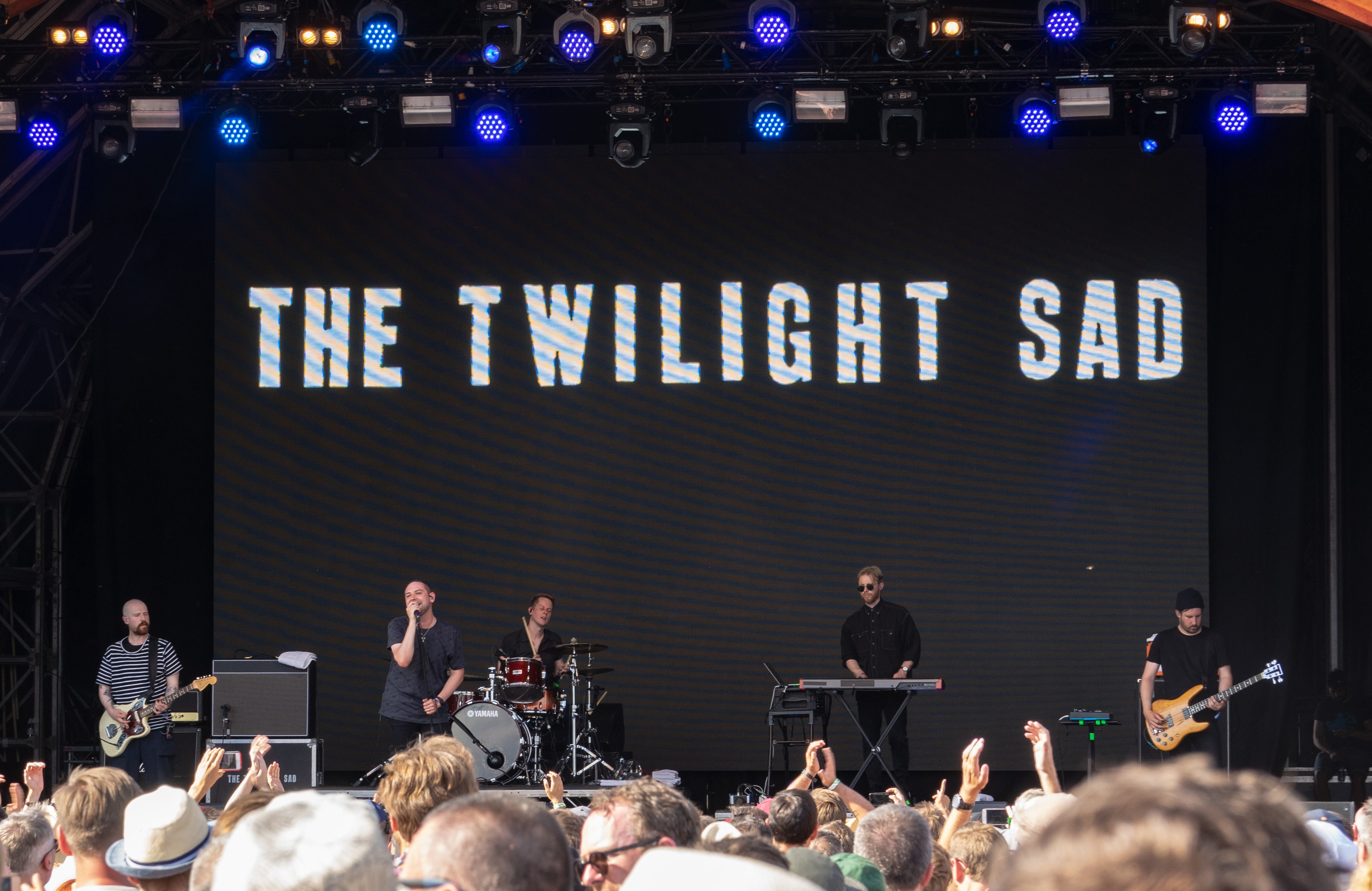
The Twilight Sad performing live at Hyde Park, London in 2018. Left to right: MacFarlane, Graham, Schultz, Smith and Docherty.

Prior to recording Nobody Wants to Be Here and Nobody Wants to Leave, the band was considering calling it quits until a major revitalisation occurred. In addition to the warm critical response the band received for their fourth album, The Twilight Sad was chosen by Robert Smith to be the supporting act for The Cure on their May/June 2016 North American tour, which included three nights at the Hollywood Bowl in Los Angeles and three nights at Madison Square Garden in New York, and continued to support The Cure on their October–December 2016 European tour, which included three nights at London's Wembley Arena as well as dates in Berlin, Rome, Madrid, Barcelona, and Paris.

On 22 January 2018, the band announced via social media that drummer Mark Devine had amicably left the band. The band's new touring drummer, Sebastien Schultz, joined shortly thereafter.

In June 2018, the band played their first shows for 18 months at the Primavera Sound festival. Following this, on 16 June they played their first UK headlining show since 2015 at the Brudenell Social Club in Leeds, and appeared at The Cure's Hyde Park show on 7 July. During these shows they premiered three new songs - "The Arbor", "VTr" and "Shooting Dennis Hopper Shooting" - as well as playing a cover of Frightened Rabbit's "Keep Yourself Warm" in tribute to close friend Scott Hutchison, who had died in May; the song was to remain in their setlists, with Graham stating: "we have a duty and responsibility to keep Scott's music and keep sharing it. When we're around touring, we need to tell people about him".

The Twilight Sad performing live at the Brudenell Social Club Community Room, Leeds in June 2018.

In an interview with NME, posted on 9 July 2018, Andy MacFarlane stated that the band's fifth studio album is "finished", with a tentative release date of January 2019. MacFarlane said, "It all came together really well. To me, it's like a different band almost. I did a stupid thing of writing loads of music, then giving it to James to write stuff over, then I deleted all the music. So then I wrote another album under it... I think we just needed to shake up the routine. One of our mates bought us those Brian Eno Oblique Strategy cards. I picked one out and it was like 'delete everything, must try harder, don't tell James'. The aim was to try and do stuff that we'd enjoy playing live, to make it more interesting for ourselves as well as everyone else." In the same interview, James Graham discussed the album's lyrics and themes, describing them as "heavier": "It's all pretty full on but there's some lighter shades and some hope on there. The first song that we're going to come back with epitomises the record. It's got really noisy guitars but it's pretty melodic. I think it's the next stage of who we're meant to be. ...I won't say exactly what it's dealing with [lyrically] because a lot of it might be quite obvious, but I'm not hiding behind a lot of metaphors anymore. I've done that, what's the point in trying to do it again? I'm really proud of our lyrics in the past but this is just what came out. I don't need to hide behind anything any more. It's a bit of a leap to just go 'this is actually how I'm feeling.' I think now is the time to just be more open and honest with people. For myself it was important to say these things, but when it was done it was great to share it's okay to feel that way."

On 10 July 2018, the band announced that they had signed to Mogwai's label Rock Action Records and released their new single, stylised as "I/m Not Here [missing face]", for streaming and as a digital download. The release coincided with an announcement of late 2018 tour dates in North America and Europe. On 5 September, the band announced that their fifth studio album, titled and stylised as It Won/t Be Like This All the Time, would be released on 18 January 2019. The album, recorded in early 2018, features Jonny Scott on drums. The first proper single, "Videograms", preceded the album on 26 October 2018. A third song lifted from the album, "VTr", was made available for download and streaming on 13 November 2018. The album was released to critical acclaim, including perfect scores from Drowned in Sound and The Skinny.

In November 2019 the band played a short UK tour of larger venues, at London's Kentish Town Forum, Manchester's O2 Ritz and Edinburgh's Usher Hall, the shows being professionally recorded. In 2020, two shows were planned in quadrophonic sound at Glasgow's Barrowland Ballroom, but those were postponed due to the COVID-19 pandemic. Instead, on what would have been the day of the first show, the band released a live album, It Won/t Be Like This All the Time Live, for download via Bandcamp on a pay-what-you-like basis, and on 17 April, the night of the second Glasgow show, fans were invited to take part in a listening party on Twitter, hosted by Tim Burgess. Graham said: "... we were supposed to be playing our second night at the famous Glasgow Barrowland Ballroom ... Let's pretend we're all at the gig together. All five of us will be taking part and sharing memories from past gigs, sharing thoughts on playing live and many other things". The Barrowland gigs finally took place in April 2022, with Mogwai's Alex Mackay stepping in for MacFarlane and Grant Hutchison for Schultz.

Hutchison played with the band at further gigs in 2022, and in September announced on his Instagram account that he has fully joined The Twilight Sad, though the band did not also make an official statement about the changing of members. In October, the band embarked on a two-month European tour, once more as The Cure's support act, followed by a similar tour of North America in mid-2023.

=== 2024–present: Becoming a duo and It's the Long Goodbye ===
Following the support tour with The Cure, the band took some time off to start work on their next album. 2024 saw the band only perform several stripped back shows featuring Graham and MacFarlane. A winter tour saw the debut of two new tracks, "Designed to Lose" and "Chest Wound to the Chest". The band later released a digital-only album recorded during these shows, titled Stripped Back. They also released an album titled The Twilight Sad - Nobody Wants To Be Here and Nobody Wants to Leave (Demos), marking the 10th anniversary of their fourth studio album with previously unreleased demo tracks.

In 2025, the band confirmed via social media that they have started recording their long-awaited new album, uploading photos from the recording studio, though no official statement was released. Their only show of the year was as one of the supports for Mogwai at the London-based festival South Facing in August. It was the band's first full-band show for two years, though the lineup featured Graham, MacFarlane, Editors' Nicholas Willes on drums and Mogwai's Alex Mackay on bass.

On 28 October 2025, the band released "Waiting for the Phone Call", their first new song in over six years. The song features The Cure's Robert Smith on guitar, with credits to Alex Mackay (bass) and Arab Strap's David Jeans (drums) appearing on the official music video for the track. Graham described the track as being about "grief, love and mental illness". Upon announcing the song, it was revealed that The Twilight Sad was now officially a duo, consisting of core songwriters Graham and MacFarlane, with Docherty, Smith and Hutchison having departed the band.

On 7 January 2026, the band announced their sixth album, It's the Long Goodbye, and it was released on 27 March via Rock Action Records. The announcement was preceded by the official release of the single "Designed to Lose". The album features David Jeans on drums and Alex Mackay on bass. Alongside the album news, several stripped-down gigs around its release were announced. The following full-band tour and further support slots with The Cure featured, alongside Graham and MacFarlane, drummer Cat Myers (formerly of Mogwai and Honeyblood) and Primal Scream's Simone Butler on bass.

== Music style and influences ==
When asked to describe their debut album, Graham said the band likes to see their songs as "folk with layers of noise", as they are based on experiences that have happened to them, around their hometowns or people they know. They often cite the works of Daniel Johnston, Serge Gainsbourg, Phil Spector, Arab Strap, and Leonard Cohen as influences. Graham lists the 2003 Arab Strap album Monday at the Hug & Pint amongst his favourite releases of the 2000s, stating that it was "the first Arab Strap album that I ever listened to... For me it was the first record that I realized it was OK to sing in your own accent. Aidan [Moffat] is one of the best lyricists of the past two decades!" Graham also cites Arcade Fire's debut album Funeral as a key influence. In a 2015 feature with Clash magazine, he said, "It was around the time that Andy [MacFarlane] had been saying to me that he wanted me to write some songs with him, and it was also around the time that I finally knew what I wanted to write about. Without this record I don't know if I'd have approached our debut album in the way that I did. Funeral had a massive influence on my songwriting style and the way in which I approach writing songs. The way in which the storytelling within the song develops as the track progresses, the power of repeating the same line within a song and the different ways to deliver the line to give it different meanings... Funeral is an album that will stay with me for the rest of my life and will always influence the music I write." Graham also mentions his liking for bands such as Joy Division. By the time of their third album, the band began exploring post-punk and krautrock facets of their influences, with MacFarlane citing artists such as PiL, Siouxsie and the Banshees, Can, Cabaret Voltaire and Wire as key inspirations.

In an October 2009 interview with The Fly, they admitted, "We are still at the stage where we don't really know where we are in this whole music industry thing. We know people like us, but we don't really know where we fit in or, if we go to certain places, up or not. [...] It's not like we're a stadium band. We're not a lads band, like Oasis or something. We're not a scenestery band, and yet we're not a pure experimental band either. Obviously we're noisy and stuff, but we write proper songs as well."

Where the band's recorded sound is layered with many melodies, their live sound is a more intense experience with a more visceral wall of noise, something the band wanted to do all along. Graham stated, "We like having the contrast between the record and playing live. There are a lot more instruments on the record. There's only four of us in the band, so we have to keep it as simple as possible. I don't know about you, but I don't like going to see a band that sounds just like their album. That's what we try not to do."

In a 2014 interview with Jazz Monroe of The Skinny, James Graham commented on the misconception of the band's "disturbed reputation" pertaining to his lyrics, as well as designer Dave "DLT" Thomas' "darkly suggestive" artwork. Monroe wrote, "There's a misconception that James himself had a difficult childhood; in fact, The Skinny has it on good authority that the Grahams are proud, attendant fans at many of their gigs." Graham elaborated that, "My mum and dad are actually the biggest supporters of our band. The songs aren't about me having a really bad childhood; it's about, from the outside, looking in at other people in my community. And the shite that happened to my family – not in my family. It's about other dickheads influencing our lives, whether or not they realise. Writing these songs is about making people feel things they wouldn't usually feel, things they're scared to feel – loss, anger, depression. To write a love song for somebody would probably be the hardest thing. I've never done that."

== Side projects and collaborations ==
Guitarist Andy MacFarlane composed the song "The Weath-er Is Bad" for Semiconductor Films' short film Brilliant Noise, a film pieced together from archive NASA footage of the Sun's surface. The song was later included on the Killed My Parents and Hit the Road compilation. MacFarlane also provided a remix of Errors' song "Bridge or Cloud?" in January 2010, which was posted as a free download on NME's website. In February 2011, MacFarlane provided a remix of FatCat labelmate Ensemble's track "Before Night", which was posted as a "song of the day" on The Line of Best Fit's website.

Singer James Graham appears on the live album Quietly Now! by fellow Scottish band Frightened Rabbit, providing additional vocals on the track "Keep Yourself Warm". In 2011, Graham appeared as a guest vocalist and songwriter on the album First Edition by The Fruit Tree Foundation, a supergroup collaboration of Scottish musicians headed by Rod Jones and Emma Pollock for the benefit of the Mental Health Foundation for Scotland. In 2015, Graham participated in Aidan Moffat's backing band during Moffat's UK tour performing Scottish folk songs. The tour was part of the documentary film Where You're Meant to Be, which was released the following year. In 2016, Graham featured as a guest vocalist with supergroup Minor Victories on their song "Scattered Ashes (Song for Richard)". The track appeared on Minor Victories' self-titled album. In 2017, Graham co-founded the band Out Lines, with fellow musicians Kathryn Joseph and Marcus Mackay. Out Lines's debut album, Conflats, was released on 27 October 2017 via Rock Action Records, Mogwai's label, where Graham had also worked outside his Twilight Sad duties. In 2022, Graham and Moffat released These Actions Cannot Be Undone, a collaborative album under the name Gentle Sinners, on Rock Action Records.

Under the name Orzelda, former bassist Craig Orzel released a solo album, The Wee Shop Is Filled with Delights, in 2008, with the EPs My Dress Up and Spiders following in 2010.

== Members ==
Current members

- James Alexander Graham – vocals (2003–present)
- Andy MacFarlane – guitars, accordion (2003–present)

Current touring musicians

- Simone Butler – bass (2026–present)
- Cat Myers – drums (2026–present)

Former members

- Craig Orzel – bass (2003–2010)
- Mark Devine – drums, programming (2003–2018)
- Johnny Docherty – bass (2010–2023)
- Brendan Smith – keyboards (2012–2023)
- Sebastien Schultz – drums (2018–2022)
- Grant Hutchison – drums (2022–2023)

Former touring musicians

- Martin Doherty – keyboards, guitars, strings (2008–2012)
- Alex Mackay – guitars, bass, keyboards (2022; 2025)
- Nicholas Willes - drums (2025)

== Discography ==
Studio albums

- Fourteen Autumns & Fifteen Winters (2007)
- Forget the Night Ahead (2009)
- No One Can Ever Know (2012)
- Nobody Wants to Be Here and Nobody Wants to Leave (2014)
- It Won/t Be Like This All the Time (2019)
- It's the Long Goodbye (2026)
