= Nicola and Teena Collins =

English-born filmmakers

Nicola & Teena Collins
- Born: c. 1978; London, England
- Years active: 2000–present

Nicola and Teena Collins (identical twins, born c.1978) are English-born filmmakers currently living in Los Angeles. Formerly models then actresses, they are best known for their portrayals of the twin daughters of Doug "The Head" Denovitz in the film Snatch.

In 2009 they made their filmmaking debut with The End, a documentary featuring interviews with former East End gangsters, one of which is the twins' father Les Falco. The film was directed by Nicola, who also conducted the interviews. Teena was the film's producer.

The twins' next film venture is Do As You Likey, a documentary about British gypsy culture.

== Acting filmography ==
Year	Film	Roles
2000	Snatch	Alex & Susi
2006	Caffeine	Tarty Girls #1 & #2
2006	The Insect Chorus	Juliette & Beatrice
