= Fourteen Autumns & Fifteen Winters =

Studio album by the Twilight Sad
- Released: 3 April 2007
- Studios: Chem19 Studios, Scotland; CaVa Studios
- Genres: Indie rock, shoegaze
- Length: 44:37
- Language: Scottish English
- Label: FatCat
- Producer: Andy MacFarlane

The Twilight Sad chronology
The Twilight Sad (2006)	Fourteen Autumns & Fifteen Winters (2007)	Here, It Never Snowed. Afterwards It Did (2008)

Singles from Fourteen Autumns and Fifteen Winters
- 1. "That Summer, at Home I Had Become the Invisible Boy" Released: 16 April 2007; 2. "And She Would Darken the Memory" Released: 16 July 2007

Fourteen Autumns & Fifteen Winters is the debut studio album by Scottish indie rock band the Twilight Sad, released by FatCat Records on 3 April 2007 in the US, and 7 May 2007 in the UK. The album features production from guitarist Andy MacFarlane and was mixed by Peter Katis. It was recorded over a short period of just three days, and the songs featured were the first ones the band had ever written. The album's influences include Van Dyke Parks, Phil Spector, Daniel Johnston, Arab Strap, Serge Gainsbourg, and Leonard Cohen.

Vocalist James Graham commented on the difference between the band's live show and the album, stating that, "If you came to see us live before you heard the record or any recordings we made, you'd probably think we were kind of a noisy band. If you had the record and sat down with it, you can totally see it's more than noise."

"That Summer, at Home I Had Become the Invisible Boy", "Last Year's Rain Didn't Fall Quite So Hard", and "And She Would Darken the Memory" also appear on the band's debut EP, The Twilight Sad, while four tracks from the album would later appear on Here, It Never Snowed. Afterwards It Did in a re-recorded state.

The Twilight Sad performed Fourteen Autumns & Fifteen Winters in its entirety for the first time in December 2013, with further UK dates performing the full album in April and May 2014. The tour dates coincided with the release of a deluxe edition reissue of the album, with bonus tracks including demos and rarities, released on Record Store Day 2014. The reissue was pressed as a double vinyl LP, limited to 500 copies only, and available in the United Kingdom only.

== Songs ==
Regarding the album's lyrical content, James Graham remarked that "All the songs are just pretty much about what's happened to us, people that I know, and where we live. [...] I never really tell anyone what the songs are about because my favorite songs are the ones that I don't know the exact meanings of either; I have my own perceptions of those songs and can relate it back to myself. So, it's just something that I always said, that I would keep what the songs are all about to myself." In a 2014 track-by-track interview about the album with Drowned in Sound, Graham remarked that opening track "Cold Days from the Birdhouse" was one of the last songs written for the album, but was originally set to be a B-side, which he claimed is "a terrifying thought as 'Cold Days' is one of the most popular songs and has been the song that's introduced so many people to our music." First single "That Summer, at Home I Had Become the Invisible Boy", whose title is a reference to the film Stand by Me, was the first song the band had ever written, and was inspired by "some pretty bad things" that happened to the band members and people close to them. The song has also been one of the band's most enduring songs, having been played at every live performance since it was written. The accordion featured in many of the songs on the album, including "Walking for Two Hours" and "I'm Taking the Train Home", was found by guitarist Andy MacFarlane in the attic of his house. Graham stated in 2014 that the accordion is "unfortunately now broken." "Last Year's Rain Didn't Fall Quite So Hard" was inspired by Animal Collective's 2004 album Sung Tongs, with MacFarlane and Graham creating melodies and vocals to loop, a writing and recording method the band had never tried before. "Talking with Fireworks / Here, It Never Snowed" is referred to the band as "Loud/Quiet" on their setlists; and when performed live, Graham provides extra cymbal crashes, sometimes even playing the cymbal with his head.

Graham has said that centerpiece "Mapped by What Surrounded Them" is a tough song to sing live given the subject matter, and the song's title is a reference to the book and film The Virgin Suicides. Online independent music site GoldFlakePaint analyzed the song as swiftly turning "childish imagery ('She's sitting in the primrose garden and she's playing with her toys') into something far more darker ('...and she's taken far too young') without ever explicating the full story; though talk of 'walls filled with blame' and visions of the protagonist watching 'Emily dance' in his dreams, only leads us to the most awful of assumptions." Second single "And She Would Darken the Memory" was the band's first song with an accompanying music video, directed by Mark Charlton. Closing instrumental "Fourteen Autumns and Fifteen Winters" was inspired by Serge Gainsbourg and the chord changes he would use; according to MacFarlane, "It had a big influence on the music, particularly this song. I've never had a piano or been able to play it, which is why it sounds like a drunken, out of time mess." A special CD edition of the album was released in late 2007 with the bonus track "Watching That Chair Painted Yellow", which was the B-side to "That Summer, at Home I Had Become the Invisible Boy".

== Artwork ==
The album's artwork was created by graphic designer/illustrator Dave Thomas, a.k.a. DLT, who has created and designed artwork for all of The Twilight Sad's releases to date, as well as for several other FatCat Records releases, among many others. The 'boy in the mask' on the album cover and inside booklet illustrations graced the covers of the album's subsequent singles: the 'boy and girl' image was featured on the cover for "That Summer, at Home I Had Become the Invisible Boy"; the 'boy falling back in the chair' image was featured on the cover for "And She Would Darken the Memory"; and the image of the 'boy about to smother his mother with a pillow' was used for the album's companion release Here, It Never Snowed. Afterwards It Did in June 2008. A similar illustration featuring the boy and the girl had previously appeared on the cover of the band's self-titled debut EP in 2006. Additionally, in December 2013, when the band performed Fourteen Autumns & Fifteen Winters live in its entirety at King Tut's Wah Wah Hut in Glasgow, handmade fabric replica masks were produced in limited quantities and sold to concert-goers. Limited edition screen prints featuring the album's artwork were also produced to coincide with the live shows.

== Critical reception ==
Professional ratings
Aggregate scores
Source	Rating
Metacritic	79/100
Review scores
Source	Rating
AllMusic	4/5 stars
The A.V. Club	A−
Drowned in Sound	8/10
The Line of Best Fit	9/10
Pitchfork	8.6/10
PopMatters	7/10
The Skinny	5/5 stars
Spin	3.5/5 stars
Stylus Magazine	B+

Fourteen Autumns & Fifteen Winters was released to positive reviews. At Metacritic, which assigns a normalized rating out of 100 based on reviews from mainstream critics, the album has received a favourable score of 79, based on 16 reviews. Pitchfork reviewer Mark Richardson praised the "vividness of the lyrical themes" and "street-level earthiness", branding it with the site's "Best New Music" tag. Richardson concluded that "The Twilight Sad approach the darker side of growing up with consideration and dignity, and manage to maintain a proper perspective. "As my bones grew, they did hurt / They hurt really bad," an angst-filled songwriter from another generation once sang; the Twilight Sad do a tremendous job of remembering that ache." The Skinny hailed the album as "one of the finest Scottish albums in years." Both The Skinny and Teletext's music page Planet Sound named Fourteen Autumns & Fifteen Winters as the best album of 2007. Regarding the album's warm critical reception, guitarist Andy MacFarlane stated that the band didn't expect the acclaim and that they "just wanted to release something that we were happy with," adding that "[the band] didn't expect anyone else to like it."

In December 2007, the album's opening track "Cold Days from the Birdhouse" was voted number 73 on Pitchfork's "Top 100 Tracks of 2007" list. In December 2009, Fourteen Autumns & Fifteen Winters ranked number 2 in The Skinny's "Scottish Albums of the Decade" list.

A 2012 review by UK site GoldFlakePaint praised the album, stating "Six years [sic] on from its release, Fourteen Autumns and Fifteen Winters is as compelling and striking as it ever was. It's a record that offers poetic and macabre sketches of desolate landscapes, and the disorientating and isolated anthropological existences that pass through them. We catch occasional small glances into the heart of them, but we never see enough of the spectacle to create full portraits; and it's those abstruse yet alluring oddities that makes the record so resoundedly intriguing to this day. A demanding but profoundly moving masterpiece."

== Track listing ==
All tracks are written by Andy MacFarlane and James Graham; arranged by The Twilight Sad.

No.	Title	Length
1.	"Cold Days from the Birdhouse"	6:13
2.	"That Summer, at Home I Had Become the Invisible Boy"	4:48
3.	"Walking for Two Hours"	5:15
4.	"Last Year's Rain Didn't Fall Quite So Hard"	3:19
5.	"Talking with Fireworks / Here, It Never Snowed"	5:14
6.	"Mapped by What Surrounded Them"	4:02
7.	"And She Would Darken the Memory"	5:49
8.	"I'm Taking the Train Home"	5:51
9.	"Fourteen Autumns and Fifteen Winters"	4:06

Limited edition bonus track
No.	Title	Length
10.	"Watching That Chair Painted Yellow"	5:30

=== 2014 deluxe vinyl reissue track listing ===
Side A
No.	Title	Length
1.	"Cold Days from the Birdhouse"	6:13
2.	"That Summer, at Home I Had Become the Invisible Boy"	4:48
3.	"Walking for Two Hours"	5:15
4.	"Last Year's Rain Didn't Fall Quite So Hard"	3:19

Side B
No.	Title	Length
5.	"Talking with Fireworks / Here, It Never Snowed"	5:14
6.	"Mapped by What Surrounded Them"	4:02
7.	"And She Would Darken the Memory"	5:49
8.	"I'm Taking the Train Home"	5:51
9.	"Fourteen Autumns and Fifteen Winters"	4:06

Demonstration Recordings, Side C
No.	Title	Length
10.	"Untitled #1 (That Summer, at Home I Had Become the Invisible Boy)" (Demo)	5:12
11.	"Untitled #2"	4:07
12.	"Untitled #4"	9:06

Demonstration Recordings, Side D
No.	Title	Length
13.	"But When She Left, Gone Was the Glow" (Demo)	5:50
14.	"Untitled #6 (And She Would Darken the Memory)" (Demo)	5:30
15.	"2d"	2:56
16.	"3iv"	3:39
17.	"Three Seconds of Dead Air" (Demo)	7:54

== Release history ==
Country	Date	Label	Format	Catalogue #
United States	3 April 2007	FatCat Records	CD	FATCD55
United Kingdom	7 May 2007	FatCat Records	CD	FATCD55
United Kingdom	7 May 2007	FatCat Records	LP	FATLP55
United Kingdom	5 November 2007	FatCat Records	Limited edition CD	FATCD55J
United Kingdom	19 April 2014	FatCat Records	Limited edition 2LP	FATLP55X
United States	19 August 2016	FatCat Records	LP	FATLP55
United Kingdom	30 November 2018	FatCat Records	LP (red-coloured vinyl)	FATLP55

== Credits ==
The Twilight Sad

- James Alexander Graham – vocals
- Andy MacFarlane – guitars, accordion
- Craig Orzel – bass
- Mark Devine – drums

Recording personnel

- The Twilight Sad – production @ Paulshalls Studios
- Paul Savage – engineering
- David Paterson – engineering ("That Summer, at Home I Had Become the Invisible Boy", "Last Year's Rain Didn't Fall Quite So Hard", and "And She Would Darken the Memory")
- Peter Katis – mixing (at Tarquin Studios, Bridgeport, Connecticut)
- David McKellar – recording (Demonstration Recordings) Paulshalls Studios
- Alan Douches – mastering (at West West Side Music)
- Jesse Baccus – mastering (at West West Side Music)

Artwork

- dlt – artwork
