= Frightened Rabbit discography =

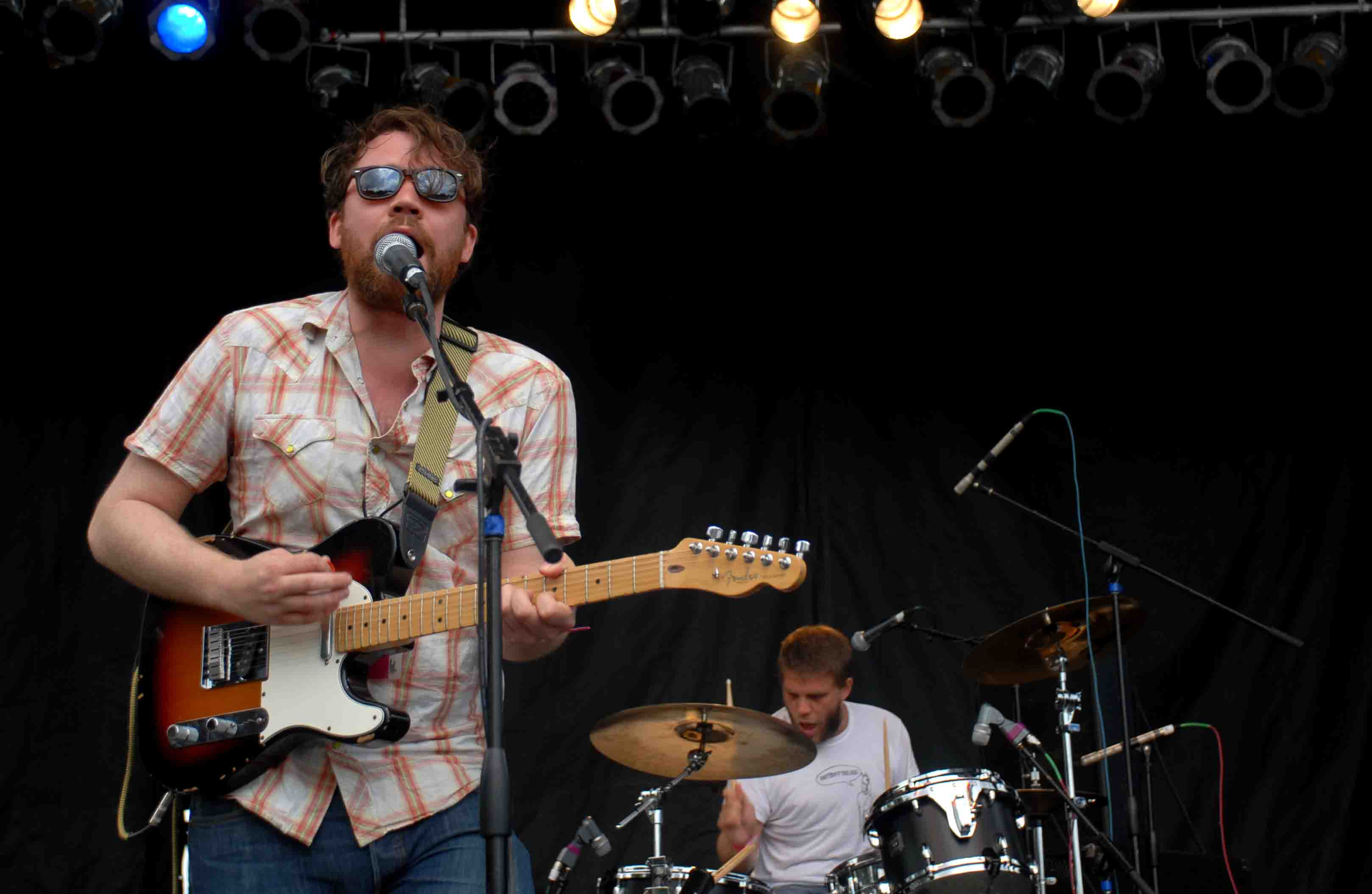
- Frightened Rabbit perform at the Pitchfork Music Festival
- Studio albums: 5
- Extended plays: 2
- Live albums: 1
- Singles: 10

The discography of Frightened Rabbit consists of five studio albums, two EPs, two live albums, and ten singles. The band released its debut album, Sing the Greys, in 2006 on independent label Hits the Fan, before signing to Fat Cat Records in 2007. In 2008, the band released its second studio album, The Midnight Organ Fight, to critical acclaim and subsequently developed a large cult following. The band's third studio album, The Winter of Mixed Drinks, was released in 2010, with the band signing to Atlantic Records later that year. A new EP, State Hospital, was released in September 2012.

== Albums ==
=== Studio albums ===
Title	Album details	Peak chart positions									
Title	Album details	SCO	AUS	CAN	IRL	UK	UK Indie	US	US Alt	US Folk	US Rock
Sing the Greys	Released: May 2006; Re-released: 2 October 2007; Labels: Hits the Fan, Fat Cat; Formats: CD, digital download	24	—	—	—	— (Note: Sing the Greys did not enter the UK Albums Chart, but peaked at number 28 on the UK Vinyl Albums Chart.)	32	—	—	—	—
The Midnight Organ Fight	Released: 15 April 2008; Label: Fat Cat; Formats: CD, digital download	6	—	—	—	56	12	—	—	—	—
The Winter of Mixed Drinks	Released: 1 March 2010; Label: Fat Cat; Formats: CD, digital download	10	—	—	—	61	5	84	14	—	22
Pedestrian Verse	Released: 4 February 2013; Label: Atlantic; Formats: CD, digital download	2	55	—	49	9	—	63	15	—	19
Painting of a Panic Attack	Released: 8 April 2016; Label: Atlantic; Formats: CD, digital download	1	56	91	42	14	—	70	8	3	10
"—" denotes album that did not chart or was not released.

=== Live albums ===
Title	Album details
Quietly Now!	Released: 21 October 2008 (US), 30 March 2009 (UK & Europe); Label: Fat Cat; Formats: CD, digital download
Live from Criminal Records	Released: 19 April 2014 (US); Label: Atlantic; Format: Vinyl

== Extended plays ==
Title	Album details	Peak chart positions			
Title	Album details	SCO	HUN	UK	US
A Frightened Rabbit EP	Released: 31 October 2011; Label: Atlantic; Formats: CD, digital download	98	4	—	—
State Hospital	Released: 24 September 2012; Label: Atlantic; Formats: CD, digital download	10	—	53	163
Recorded Songs	Released: 15 September 2017; Label: Atlantic; Formats: CD, digital download	—	—	—	—
"—" denotes album that did not chart or was not released.

== Singles ==
Title	Year	Peak chart positions							Album
Title	Year	SCO	AUS Hit.	MEX Air.	UK	UK Indie	US Sales	US AAA	Album
"Be Less Rude"	2007	—	—	—	—	—	—	—	Sing the Greys
"The Greys"	2007	—	—	—	—	—	—	—	Sing the Greys
"It's Christmas So We'll Stop" (2007)	2007	—	—	—	—	39	—	—	Non-album single
"Head Rolls Off"	2008	—	—	—	—	23	—	—	The Midnight Organ Fight
"Fast Blood"	2008	—	—	—	—	15	—	—	The Midnight Organ Fight
"I Feel Better"	2008	—	—	—	— (Note: "I Feel Better" did not enter the UK Singles Chart, but peaked at number 23 on the UK Physical Singles Chart Top 100.)	21	—	—	The Midnight Organ Fight
"It's Christmas So We'll Stop" (2008)	2008	84	—	—	—	24	—	—	Non-album single
"Swim Until You Can't See Land"	2009	86	—	24	— (Note: "Swim Until You Can't See Land" did not enter the UK Singles Chart, but peaked at number 48 on the UK Physical Singles Chart Top 100.)	48	3	—	The Winter of Mixed Drinks
"Nothing Like You"	2010	—	—	—	— (Note: "Nothing Like You" did not enter the UK Singles Chart, but peaked at number 19 on the UK Physical Singles Chart Top 100.)	— (Note: "Nothing Like You" did not enter the UK Independent Singles Chart, but peaked at number 13 on the UK Independent Singles Breakers Chart.)	10	—	The Winter of Mixed Drinks
"Living in Colour"	2010	—	—	—	—	—	—	—	The Winter of Mixed Drinks
"The Loneliness and the Scream"	2010	—	—	—	—	—	11	—	The Winter of Mixed Drinks
"State Hospital"	2012	—	—	—	—	—	—	—	State Hospital
"The Woodpile"	2012	74	20	42	184	—	—	—	Pedestrian Verse
"Backyard Skulls"	2013	95	—	45	— (Note: "Backyard Skulls" did not enter the UK Singles Chart, but peaked at number 42 on the UK Singles Sales Chart.)	—	—	—	Pedestrian Verse
"Architect" (with Manchester Orchestra)	2013	—	—	—	— (Note: "Architect" did not enter the UK Singles Chart, but peaked at number 29 on the UK Physical Singles Chart Top 100.)	—	—	—	Non-album singles
"Norland Wind" (with Lau)	2013	—	—	—	— (Note: "Norland Wind" did not enter the UK Singles Chart, but peaked at number 48 on the UK Physical Singles Chart Top 100.)	—	—	—	Non-album singles
"Late March, Death March"	2013	—	—	—	— (Note: "Late March, Death March" did not enter the UK Singles Chart, but peaked at number 41 on the UK Singles Sales Chart.)	—	—	—	Pedestrian Verse
"Get Out"	2016	—	—	—	—	—	—	12	Painting of a Panic Attack
"Woke Up Hurting"	2016	—	—	—	—	—	—	—	Painting of a Panic Attack
"Roadless"	2017	51	—	—	— (Note: "Roadless" did not enter the UK Singles Chart, but peaked at number 6 on the UK Physical Singles Chart Top 100.)	—	15	—	Recorded Songs
"—" denotes single that did not chart or was not released

=== Other charted songs ===
Title	Year	Peak chart positions		Album
Title	Year	SCO	UK Sales	Album
"Floating in the Forth"	2008	83	—	The Midnight Organ Fight
"Scottish Winds"	2012	—	34	The Frightened Rabbit EP
"I Wish I Was Sober"	2016	84	—	Painting of a Panic Attack
"—" denotes song that did not chart.

== Music videos ==
Year	Title
2009	"Living in Colour"
2009	"Swim Until You Can't See Land"
2009	"The Loneliness & the Scream"
2012	"State Hospital"
2012	"Dead Now"
2012	"The Woodpile"
2012	"Backyard Skulls"
2013	"Late March, Death March"
2016	"Get Out"
2016	"Woke Up Hurting"
2017	"Roadless"
