= Painting of a Panic Attack =

2016 album by Frightened Rabbit

Studio album by Frightened Rabbit
- Released: 8 April 2016
- Recorded: 2015
- Studios: Dreamland, Hurley, New York; Aaron's Garage, Ditmas Park, Brooklyn
- Genre: Indie rock
- Length: 45:08
- Label: Atlantic
- Producer: Aaron Dessner

Frightened Rabbit chronology
Pedestrian Verse (2013)	Painting of a Panic Attack (2016)

Singles from Painting of a Panic Attack
- 1. "Get Out" Released: 2 March 2016; 2. "Woke Up Hurting" Released: 4 April 2016

Painting of a Panic Attack is the fifth and final studio album by Scottish indie rock band Frightened Rabbit. The album was released on 8 April 2016, through Atlantic Records. It is the band's only studio album to feature guitarist and keyboardist Simon Liddell, a touring member who joined them in a permanent capacity after the departure of Gordon Skene. After frontman and founding member Scott Hutchison's disappearance and subsequent death in 2018, the remaining members retired the Frightened Rabbit name, leaving Painting of a Panic Attack as their final album.

Following the release of their fourth studio album, Pedestrian Verse (2013), Frightened Rabbit embarked on an extensive tour in promotion of the album, a process which left the members burnt out and frustrated. Hutchison moved to Los Angeles to be with his girlfriend at the time, and recorded a solo album, Owl John (2014), while the rest of the band remained in Glasgow. When the band started working on new music, the songs were transmitted via email between Hutchison and the other members. The full band reconvened in New York during the summer of 2015 to record Painting of a Panic Attack. The album was produced by Aaron Dessner, who first met Frightened Rabbit when they opened for The National in 2013.

Painting of a Panic Attack marked a departure from Frightened Rabbit's signature sound as they began to incorporate electronic elements into their music. Dessner's production was compared to his work with the National, a decision that was met with mixed approval from music critics. Hutchison's lyrics and vocal performance, however, received widespread critical acclaim. Painting of a Panic Attack also did well commercially, reaching number one on the Scottish Albums Chart, number 14 on the UK Albums Chart and number 42 on the Irish Albums Chart.

== Background ==
Frightened Rabbit released their fourth studio album Pedestrian Verse on 4 February 2013, via Atlantic Records. As part of the album promotion, the band embarked on an extensive 18-month tour, which led to burnout and heightened tensions within the ensemble. Drummer Grant Hutchison told Jason Keil of the Phoenix New Times that they "just got run absolutely ragged [...] We all lost each other and ourselves a little bit" over the tour. After the conclusion of the tour, lead vocalist and Grant's brother Scott Hutchison moved to Los Angeles to be with his girlfriend at the time. While there, he recorded a solo album, titled Owl John. Grant and the rest of Frightened Rabbit, meanwhile, remained in Glasgow.

In 2014, guitarist and keyboardist Gordon Skene decided to leave the band. In a statement on Facebook, the remaining members of Frightened Rabbit said, "There is no more to tell other than sometimes things just don't work out and when people have differing opinions often the best option is to simply part ways and get on with life separately." In Skene's place, touring member Simon Liddell was brought in as a permanent guitarist and keyboardist. In an interview with Gigwise, Hutchison told Andrew Trendell, "Without going too far into it, Gordon's personality didn't fit with the band, and Simon's really, really does".

== Writing and recording ==
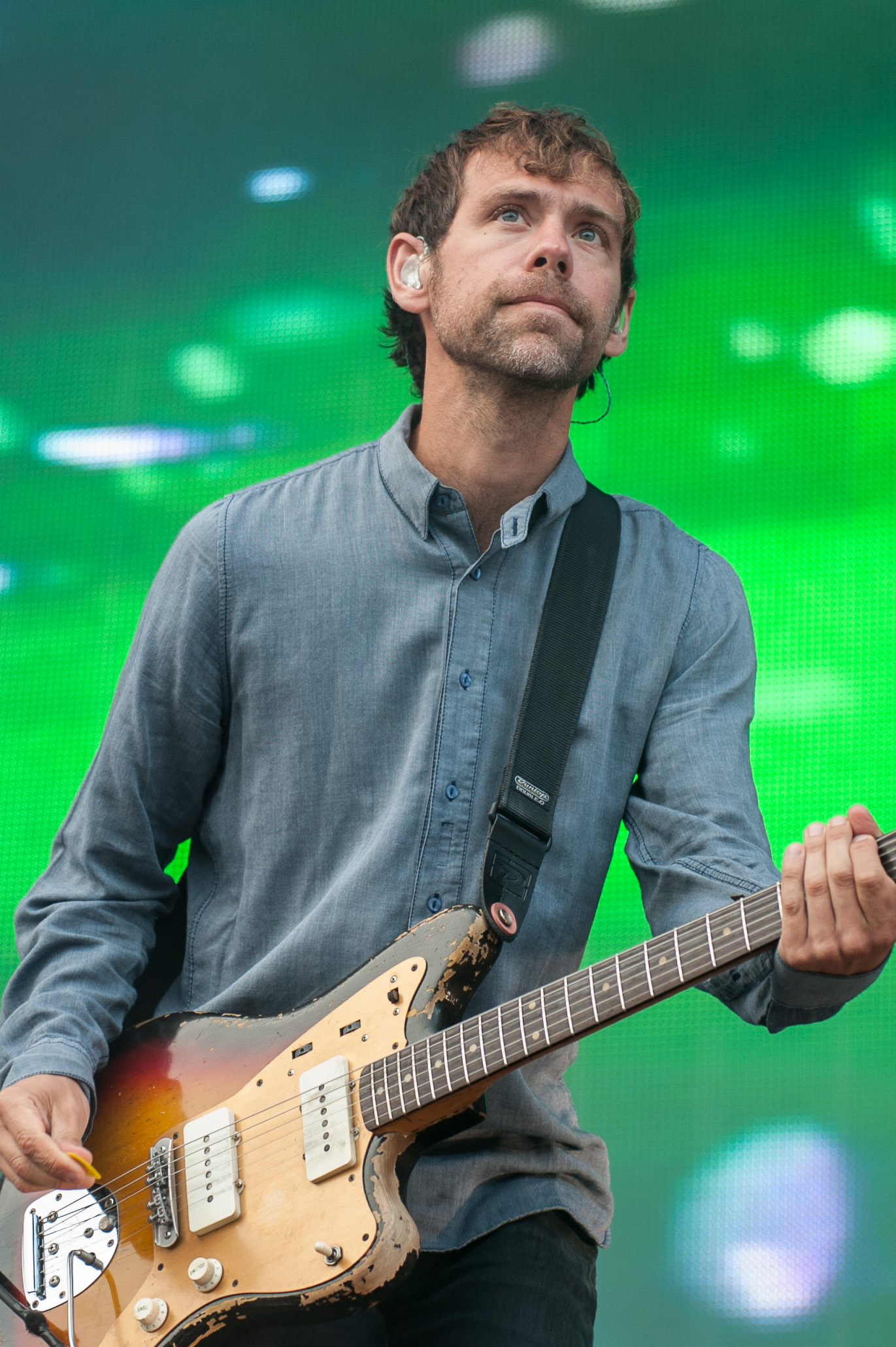
Aaron Dessner of the National produced Painting of a Panic Attack, which was partially recorded at his Brooklyn home.

The isolation caused by spending 18 months in Los Angeles inspired much of Hutchison's writing process going into Painting of a Panic Attack. Believing that the city itself felt "anxious", Hutchison would take trips to Big Bear Lake, California to focus on his songwriting. In late 2014, the full band reconvened in Wales for a writing session. This meeting proved largely unproductive, as Hutchison dealt with writer's block, which Grant believed was due to his brother "forcing himself to try something different, rather than just writing naturally and then maybe tweaking it a little bit". The album was largely written long-distance, with Hutchison and the rest of Frightened Rabbit sending tracks back and forth via email. Grant believed that the transatlantic communication actually helped the band, because "[w]hen you're in a room with someone [...] You either hold back from saying anything or you say something and it causes offense, or it creates tension, and there was none of that."

Hutchison met musician and producer Aaron Dessner when Frightened Rabbit toured with Dessner's band, the National, in 2013. Following that tour, Dessner and Scott kept in communication, which the latter described as "half work, half socializing". After initial conversations about a potential collaboration between their two bands, Hutchison told The Skinny that "it became clear that he was interested in making the album!" Frightened Rabbit convened with Dessner in the summer of 2015 for two weeks of initial recording sessions at Dreamland Recording Studios in Hurley, New York, not far from Woodstock. After a two-week break, Painting of a Panic Attack was finished at Dessner's home studio, Aaron's Garage, in Ditmas Park, Brooklyn.

== Themes and composition ==
The bulk of the album surrounds the decline of Hutchison's relationship after he moved to Los Angeles, and the way in which he and his girlfriend "just built this moat around [them]selves and it became such an intense thing – and an incredibly unhealthy thing in a lot of ways, where you rely almost completely on this one person". Unlike previous records, such as Pedestrian Verse and Frightened Rabbit's second studio album The Midnight Organ Fight (2008), which were written some time after the breakup that inspired them, most of the lyrics on Painting of a Panic Attack were composed while Hutchison was in the midst of the relationship. As a result, the album is bleaker than previous releases, because "if you write after the fact [...] then you're able to be amusing about it or more hopeful about it". The crux of Painting of a Panic Attack, Hutchison said, is about the feeling of "we're gonna escape, but where are we gonna escape to?" Hutchison's mother described Painting of a Panic Attack as a "healing album", but Hutchison himself was skeptical that it was "any more personal or any more cathartic than anything else I've done".

Thematically, Painting of a Panic Attack began as a straightforward concept album, "where it was going to have a couple of characters and a narrative around them. And then life gets in the way, or walks in." When Hutchison sent the initial demos to Grant, his brother observed how he was "editing [his] own life out of the songs to censor personal issues", and, after spending "a couple of days sulking about it", Scott responded to Grant and said, "'regretfully, you are correct'". Its most personal track is "Still Want To Be Here", which exists as a culmination of Hutchison's feelings on his time in California, while "I Wish I Was Sober" is an "amalgamation" of several times when Hutchison realized that his patterns of alcohol use were unhealthy.

Hutchison told The Skinny that Pedestrian Verse "became a conclusion of sorts", and the band began to move towards a different sound with Painting of a Panic Attack. In particular, Frightened Rabbit started to incorporate electronic instruments into the album, as the geographic separation between Scott and the rest of the band required Scott to use music software to supplement his "acoustic guitar and vocals in a room". On songs like "Woke Up Hurting", the dark lyrics are contrasted with an upbeat instrumental backing, as Hutchison has "always enjoyed that contrast between twisted lyrics and something that's a very open door". The album closes with a subdued, piano-focused number, "Die Like a Rich Boy". Hutchison said that Frightened Rabbit was either going to close with the track or "Death Dream", and chose the former because, "The two characters go out with a bang but the album doesn't, musically speaking."

The original album title was Monuments, which Scott said was "supposed to be representative of a beautiful place that you go to remember something awful". Painting of a Panic Attack similarly "was a way to describe someone or something beautiful yet damaged", and Scott believed "that contrast between beauty and turmoil" was an excellent summation of the album. Other potential album titles included The Spill of the War, taken from a lyric in "Blood Under The Bridge", and Bye. While Monuments was eventually dismissed as being "too open and vague" for the album, the working title did inspire the cover art, which depicts "a monument being a place to go to remember something awful".

== Release and promotion ==
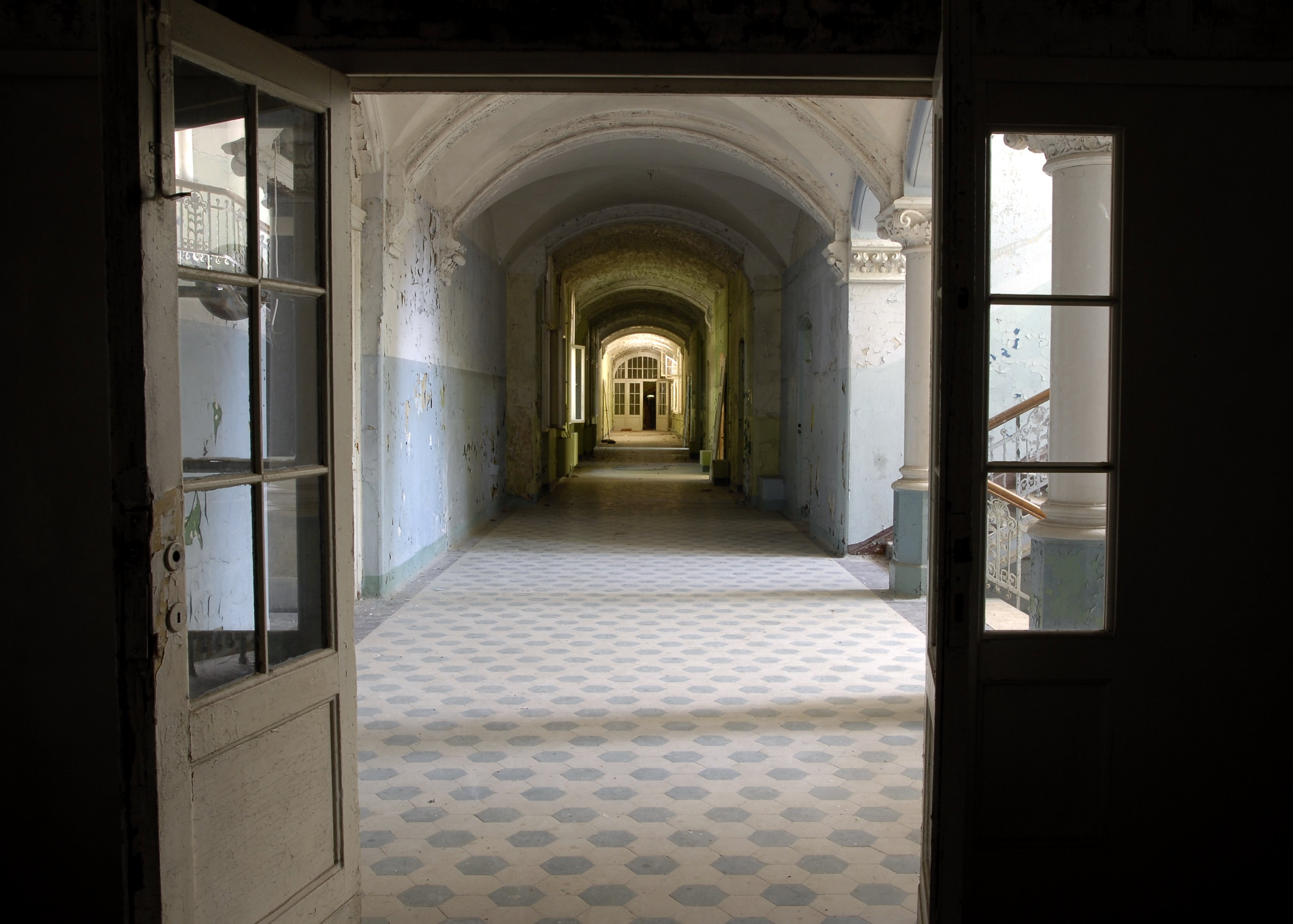
The Beelitz-Heilstätten hospital complex was used as the setting for the "Woke Up Hurting" music video.

=== Singles and music videos ===
Frightened Rabbit announced the details of their then-upcoming album, including the title, track listing, and release date, on 19 February 2016. As part of the announcement, the first track from Painting of a Panic Attack, "Death Dream", was made available for streaming the same day. The lead single and music video from the album, "Get Out", was released two weeks later, on 2 March 2016. The video, directed by Greg Davenport, depicts two women falling in love in Kyiv. Hutchison described the song as "about that person to whom you are completely addicted". He added, "I think Greg's video reflects this sentiment beautifully, the literal push and pull of an intense but destructive love." Monaghan told Transmission Glasgow that they chose to release "Death Dream" and "Get Out" first "so people have been reassured hopefully by the first one [...] and then saw that things are a bit different with the second one".

On 18 March 2016, the band released the full version of "Lump Street", which originally appeared as part of an album trailer. Painting of a Panic Attack's closing track, "Die Like a Rich Boy", was made available for streaming on 1 April, while the last song and video to be unveiled before the album's debut was "Woke Up Hurting" on 4 April 2016. The music video for "Woke Up Hurting" was directed by Dan Massie, and set in the abandoned Beelitz-Heilstätten military hospital complex, just outside of Berlin. Painting of a Panic Attack was released on 8 April, via Atlantic Records.

Two more tracks from Painting of a Panic Attack would receive music videos after the album's 8 April 2016 release. On 14 June 2016, Frightened Rabbit released a solo acoustic video for "Die Like A Rich Boy", featuring Hutchison singing and playing guitar on a bench in an abandoned building. On 11 November, they released a video for "I Wish I Was Sober", depicting a woman fighting against a crowd of people who wish to throw her over the roof of a parking garage.

=== Tours and live performances ===
In February 2016, the band performed a sold-out secret show at the Glasgow School of Art (GSA), under the name of Footshooters. At the GSA performance, which was the first official Frightened Rabbit concert in two years, the band played "Die Like a Rich Boy" and "Lump Street". Footshooters returned on 11 May for a show at Boston Music Room in London, in which they played several songs from Painting of a Panic Attack. Additionally, on 28 March, Frightened Rabbit performed "Get Out" live on The Late Show with Stephen Colbert.

As part of the Painting of a Panic Attack album announcement, Frightened Rabbit also released dates for a spring 2016 United States tour, with support from Caveman. In June, they added a series of summer and fall tour dates across Europe and North America, including appearances at Glastonbury Festival, Down the Rabbit Hole, and Lollapalooza. Support for the later tour dates was provided by Mothers, Julien Baker, and Lucy Dacus. In August 2016, Hutchison posted and deleted a series of tweets that he called "a bit of a meltdown", and the result of "mixing alcohol, depression, and social media". The band canceled their appearances at the Haldern Pop and Rock am See festivals in Germany in order to focus on Hutchison's mental health and recovery.

In October 2017, Frightened Rabbit announced a tour of the US and the United Kingdom in celebration of the 10th anniversary of The Midnight Organ Fight. In May 2018, Hutchison was reported missing, and his body was recovered two days later in South Queensferry, Scotland. The remaining members of the band told The Guardian that Frightened Rabbit "doesn't exist without Scott". The soundtrack for Gary McNair's 2018 play Square Go would be the final project written under the Frightened Rabbit name.

== Reception ==
=== Critical reception ===
Professional ratings
Aggregate scores
Source	Rating
AnyDecentMusic?	7.3/10
Metacritic	70/100
Review scores
Source	Rating
AllMusic	4/5 stars
The A.V. Club	B
Clash	8/10
The Independent	4/5 stars
The Line of Best Fit	8.5/10
Paste	8.5/10
Pitchfork	6.0/10
PopMatters	7/10
The Skinny	4/5 stars
Under the Radar	4.5/10

Painting of a Panic Attack was met with mostly positive reviews from music critics. At Metacritic, which assigns a normalized rating out of 100 to reviews from mainstream critics, Painting of a Panic Attack has an average score of 70 based on 20 reviews. The review aggregator AnyDecentMusic? gave the album 7.3 out of 10, based on their assessment of the critical consensus.

While James Christopher Monger of AllMusic declared that Frightened Rabbit created "another swoon-inducing, bloody-sleeved collection of erudite indie rock anthems that distill angst, both existential and situational, into fist-pumping crowd-pleasers", reviews largely focused on the ways in which Frightened Rabbit's sound evolved and matured on the record, without losing the lyrical and acoustic elements that have come to define the band. Roisin O'Connor from The Independent said that, "the core of the band is still there in Hutchinson’s lyrics, the way he pours his soul into the music and how tight the band feel as a whole right now". Steven Edelstone, who called the album "a triumph" in a review for Paste, referred to Painting of a Panic Attack as "the most lyrically complex Frightened Rabbit album to date, one that takes multiple listens to fully delve into". Chris Taylor from The Line of Best Fit praised Hutchison's poetic lyricism, and his "way of making lyrics filled with a somber directness feel like they're shrouded in a fog of uncertainty". The Skinny's Finbarr Bermingham joked that Hutchison's "sleeve must surely be threadbare now, given the number of times he's worn his heart on it". Many reviewers commented on the way that the instrumentation accompanies Hutchison's lyrics and melodies, with Robin Murray of Clash praising the manner in which "the stripped down arrangements [allow] each part to gain just slightly more prominence". Edelstone commented that Painting of a Panic Attack "represents Frightened Rabbit at its most restrained", and that they "[cut] out all fluff to their overall sound". Eric Swedlund of The A.V. Club was less enthusiastic about the instrumental shift, saying that the "subdued soundscape is ultimately a move that sacrifices a bit of the power that made the band so great to begin with".

Dessner's production was a point of debate for critics, with Andre Paine of the Evening Standard saying that "there was every chance the transatlantic indie-rock partnership [between Dessner and the band] would result in music both melancholy and majestic". Alexandra Fletchner of PopMatters said that it is a "nice change" to see "Frightened Rabbit dressed up as The National for Halloween", while a review from Pitchfork's Ian Cohen was more skeptical, saying that Dessner's influence can "work for a newer act that's trying to hit a similar emotional tenor to the National", but "a band less willing to exert their own personality ends up with something like Wilder Mind". In the case of Painting of a Panic Attack, Cohen said the album falls "somewhere in between", and that the thing missing is "some kind of levity or the cutting humor that once personalized Hutchison's self-loathing". The greatest dissenting voice came from Charles Steinberg of Under the Radar, who opined that "the incorporation of frontman Scott Hutchison's verses of cagey lament and realization into Dessner's poignant pop arrangements feels contrived rather than meant to be".

=== Commercial performance and accolades ===
Painting of a Panic Attack had a moderate commercial showing in Europe and North America. In the US, the album spent one week on the Billboard 200, coming in at number 70. It also appeared on the US Top Rock Albums, Alternative Albums, and Americana/Folk Albums charts, peaking at numbers 10, 8, and 3, respectively. Additionally, "Get Out" made an appearance at number 12 on the US Adult Alternative Airplay chart. Outside of the US, Painting of a Panic Attack spent two weeks on the UK Albums Chart, peaking at number 14, and reached number one on the Scottish Albums Chart for the week of 15 April 2016. Elsewhere, the album appeared on the Canadian Albums Chart at number 91, and spent one week on the Irish Albums Chart, at number 42.

At the end of the year, Painting of a Panic Attack ranked at number 37 on The Skinny's "Top 50 Albums of 2016". The album also appeared on the longlist for the 2017 Scottish Album of the Year Award, a prize which ultimately went to Sacred Paws' debut studio album, Strike a Match.

== Track listing ==
All lyrics are written by Scott Hutchison; all music is composed by Frightened Rabbit, with assistance from Aaron Dessner on tracks 5 and 8.

Standard edition track listing
No.	Title	Writer(s)	Length
1.	"Death Dream"		4:06
2.	"Get Out"		3:21
3.	"I Wish I Was Sober"		3:22
4.	"Woke Up Hurting"		3:54
5.	"Little Drum"	Aaron Dessner	3:29
6.	"Still Want to Be Here"		3:52
7.	"An Otherwise Disappointing Life"		3:55
8.	"Break"	Aaron Dessner	2:59
9.	"Blood Under the Bridge"		3:55
10.	"400 Bones"		3:53
11.	"Lump Street"		5:00
12.	"Die Like a Rich Boy"		3:22
Total length:			45:08

Deluxe edition bonus tracks
No.	Title	Length
13.	"The Wreck"	3:10
14.	"Wait 'Til the Morning"	3:18
15.	"A Lick of Paint"	3:42
Total length:		55:18

== Personnel ==
Frightened Rabbit

- Scott Hutchison – lead vocals, rhythm guitar, additional engineer
- Billy Kennedy – bass guitar
- Andy Monaghan – guitar, keyboard, additional engineer
- Grant Hutchison – drums, percussion
- Simon Liddell – guitar, keyboard

Technical

- Aaron Dessner – production, engineer
- Jonathan Low – engineer, mixing on tracks 9 and 12
- Brett Cox – additional engineer on track 11
- Charlie Andrew – additional engineer on track 11
- Craig Silvey – mixing
- Alan Moulder – mixing on tracks 2 and 4
- Eduardo de la Paz Canel – mixing on track 10
- Greg Calbi – mastering

Information taken from the Painting of a Panic Attack liner notes.

== Charts ==
Chart performance for Painting of a Panic Attack
Chart (2016)	Peak position
Australian Albums (ARIA)	56
Canadian Albums (Billboard)	91
Irish Albums (IRMA)	42
Scottish Albums (Official Charts)	1
UK Albums (Official Charts)	14
UK Americana Albums (Official Charts)	2
US Billboard 200	70
US Top Rock Albums (Billboard)	10
US Top Alternative Albums (Billboard)	8
US Americana/Folk Albums (Billboard)	3
