= Quietly Now! =

Live album by Frightened Rabbit
- Released: 21 October 2008 (US); 30 March 2009 (UK & Europe)
- Recorded: The Captain's Rest, Glasgow; 30 July 2008
- Genre: Indie rock
- Label: Fat Cat Records

Frightened Rabbit chronology
The Midnight Organ Fight (2008)	Quietly Now! (2008)	The Winter of Mixed Drinks (2010)

Professional ratings
Review scores
Source	Rating
The Skinny	4/5 stars
Sputnikmusic	4.5/5

Quietly Now! (also known as Liver! Lung! FR!) is a live album by Scottish indie rock band Frightened Rabbit, released on 21 October 2008 in the US and on 30 March 2009 in the UK and Europe. The album is a "primarily acoustic" performance of the band's acclaimed second album, The Midnight Organ Fight, recorded live at The Captain's Rest in Glasgow on 30 July 2008.

Instrumental interludes, "Bright Pink Bookmark" and "Extrasupervery", are omitted from this release, as they are not performed by the band at live performances.

Regarding the release, vocalist/guitarist Scott Hutchison stated that he "[doesn't] care if people buy it or don't buy it, download it or steal a track from their friends. It's for the fans, the people who were there and for me as a souvenir of the show".

Guests on the album are James Graham (The Twilight Sad), who provides lead vocals on "Keep Yourself Warm", and Ross Clark (Three Blind Wolves / Fiskur), who plays on "Old Old Fashioned" and "Poke".

== Track listing ==
All songs by Frightened Rabbit

1. "The Modern Leper"
2. "I Feel Better"
3. "Good Arms vs. Bad Arms"
4. "Fast Blood"
5. "Old Old Fashioned"
6. "The Twist"
7. "Head Rolls Off"
8. "My Backwards Walk"
9. "Keep Yourself Warm"
10. "Poke"
11. "Floating in the Forth"
12. "Who'd You Kill Now?"

== Personnel ==
- Scott Hutchison - vocals, guitar, artwork
- Grant Hutchison - drums, vocals
- Billy Kennedy - guitar, vocals, keyboards, bass
- Andy Monaghan - guitar, keyboards, bass
- James Graham - vocals ("Keep Yourself Warm")
- Ross Clark - mandolin ("Old Old Fashioned"), banjo ("Poke")
- Gal - recording, engineering
- Adam Pierce - mixing
- Dan Coutant - mixing
- Alan Douches - mastering
- Alex McNutt - live sound
