= Mastersystem =

2018 British rock supergroup

- Years active: 2018
- Label: Physical Education
- Past members: Scott Hutchison; Grant Hutchison; Justin Lockey; James Lockey
- Website: mastersystemband.com

Mastersystem were a British rock supergroup composed of two sets of brothers, who were members of the groups Frightened Rabbit (including the late Scott Hutchison), Editors and Minor Victories. They released their debut and only album, Dance Music, on 6 April 2018, to critical acclaim. The band began a UK tour supporting the album that same month, but further summer dates and a plan for a wider tour later in the year were halted after the passing of Hutchison a month later.

The remaining members of the band released the music video for their final single, "Old Team", in November 2018.

Dance Music was included in several best-albums-of-2018 year-end lists, notably ranking in those by Rough Trade (17th), ABC News (21st), The Skinny (30th), NME (55th), Under the Radar (71st), and Noisey (76th).

== Origin ==
In 2012, the Scottish indie rock band Frightened Rabbit recorded their fourth studio album, Pedestrian Verse, in a house in the Scottish Highlands. During this time, brothers Scott and Grant Hutchison of the band befriended Justin and James Lockley of Hand Held Cine Club, who asked if they could accompany Frightened Rabbit and record their album process.

Upon release of Dance Music, Scott confided that the band had originally been named "Old Team" in acknowledgement of all four band members' being time-served artists in the music industry.

== Members ==
- Scott Hutchison – guitar, vocals (Frightened Rabbit) (d. 2018)
- Grant Hutchison – drums (Frightened Rabbit)
- Justin Lockey – guitar (Editors, yourcodenameis:milo)
- James Lockey – bass (Minor Victories)

== Songwriting ==
The band worked on the instrumental and lyrical writing processes separately, with Scott penning the lyrics only after tracks had been developed by the other members (Grant, Justin and James). This was in contrast to other projects fronted by Scott (Frightened Rabbit and Owl John), where Scott was a core element of the instrumental songwriting.

== Discography ==
- Dance Music (Physical Education Recordings, 2018)
