= State Hospital (disambiguation) =

The State Hospital is a psychiatric hospital in Carstairs, Scotland.

State Hospital may also refer to:

- State hospital, a government operated facility
- State Hospital (EP), a 2012 EP by Frightened Rabbit
- State Hospital (Metro-North station), now Harlem Valley–Wingdale station, a railroad station in Dover, New York
