= The Birthday Suit =

Scottish indie rock band

- Also known as: Rod Jones & the Birthday Suit
- Origin: Edinburgh, Scotland
- Genre: Indie rock
- Years active: 2011–present
- Label: Sing It Alone
- Members: Rod Jones; Jacqueline Irvine; David Jack; Steve Morrison; Seán McLaughlin; Catrin Pryce-Jones

The Birthday Suit is a Scottish indie rock band from Edinburgh, formed in 2011 by Idlewild guitarist Rod Jones. Alongside Jones, the band's line-up includes Jacqueline Irvine, David Jack, Steve Morrison, Séan McLaughlin and Catrin Pryce-Jones.

To date, the band has released three studio albums, The Eleventh Hour (2011) and A Conversation Well Rehearsed (2012) and A Hollow Hole Of Riches (2014).

== History ==
=== Formation and The Eleventh Hour (2011) ===
In late 2010, Idlewild entered an indefinite hiatus. Guitarist and backing vocalist, Jones, subsequently formed The Birthday Suit the following year after writing material for his second solo album. Jones noted:

I started making a second solo record, then got sick of it. I began writing a set of completely new songs which turned out to have more of an indie rock sound, and it felt more like band material than solo stuff. Even though I wrote it by myself at home, it wouldn’t have been right to record it alone, so I got a small band together. The name of The Birthday Suit was sort of an in-joke that stuck.

Jones elaborated, "With the addition of a few friends and local musicians it took on a new life and it was really apparent that it was a group of people I really wanted to play with."

The band released its debut album, The Eleventh Hour, in late 2011, and followed its release with multiple performances in Glasgow and Edinburgh during the next year. The band performed at T in the Park and Wickerman Festival, and subsequently began working on a follow-up album.

=== A Conversation Well Rehearsed (2012) ===
A single, "Less Worthless Years", was released in July 2012, with an accompanying EP release that features full-band versions of songs from Jones' debut solo album, A Sentimental Education (2010).

The band's second studio album, A Conversation Well Rehearsed was released on 3 December 2012. The album was listed in 19th place in the Clean Slate Music website's "Top 21 Albums of 2012" list, although the website write that the second album "doesn’t carry the punch" of the band's debut album.

=== A Hollow Hole of Riches (2013-present) ===
In October 2013, the band released a new single, "A Bigger World", featuring Scott Hutchison of Frightened Rabbit, and announced the release of its third studio album, A Hollow Hole of Riches.

== Musical influences ==
Jones revealed in a 2012 interview that Thurston Moore, of American band, Sonic Youth, was a seminal influence as Moore facilitated a realisation that "there was more to the guitar than just playing really fast and learning scale".

== Perspectives ==
Journalists have queried Jones on his approach within the Birthday Suit in relation to Idlewild and the frontman has been open about his thoughts. In his interview with Fame magazine, Jones revealed that starting "at the bottom again" was the most difficult aspect of starting a new band; while in a guest column for Q Music, Jones explored the past in greater detail:

I honestly think we made some great records, and maybe we will do again some day, but without the rose tinted glasses I probably had fixed to my face at the time, I realise there were definitely opportunities squandered. Too late in the bands life came the notion that throwing yourself around the stage and making a racket was great in a club but maybe didn't translate to an arena or stadium crowd. We needed to be more ambitious with our shows. It wasn't just about having a laugh. Being a stadium band was an artform. One all too foreign to us.

In an interview with the website, Street Savvy, Jones focused on The Birthday Suit, stating that he thought that "if you can make yourself recognisable by your music and your playing then you must be doing something right", in response to a question on what his band can offer the "music industry"; Jones further explained, in respect to his aspirations for the Birthday Suit's music, "Enjoyment. That's all I can ask. I'm not going to pretend I want to change the world with my songs because I wouldn't know where to start. All I hope for is that people listen to the music and enjoy it."

== Discography ==
Studio albums

- The Eleventh Hour (2011)
- A Conversation Well Rehearsed (2012)
- A Hollow Hole of Riches (2014)

Singles

- "Do You Ever?"
- "Less Worthless Years" (2012)
- "Uh-huh- Uh-huh" (2013)
- "A Bigger World" (2013)

== See also ==
- Music of Scotland
