= The Eleventh Hour (The Birthday Suit album) =

Studio album by The Birthday Suit
- Released: 11 November 2011
- Recorded: 2010
- Genre: indie rock, Alternative rock
- Length: 40:17
- Label: Sing it Alone Records

The Birthday Suit chronology
The Eleventh Hour (2011)	A Conversation Well Rehearsed (2012)

Professional ratings
Review scores
Source	Rating
Drowned in Sound	6/10
PopMatters	6/10

The Eleventh Hour is the debut studio album by Scottish indie rock band The Birthday Suit, released on 11 November 2011 on Sing it Alone Records.

== Background ==
In 2010 Idlewild entered an indefinite hiatus and so guitarist and backing vocalist Rod Jones subsequently formed The Birthday Suit in 2011 after writing material for his second album, Jones noted:

I started making a second solo record, then got sick of it. I began writing a set of completely new songs which turned out to have more of an indie rock sound, and it felt more like band material than solo stuff. Even though I wrote it by myself at home, it wouldn’t have been right to record it alone, so I got a small band together. The name of The Birthday Suit was sort of an in-joke that stuck.

They signed to Sing it Alone and released their debut single "Do You Ever?" as a free download, and in November 2011 they released The Eleventh Hour and followed its release with multiple performances in Glasgow and Edinburgh during the next year. The band performed at T in the Park and Wickerman Festival, and began working on a follow-up album.

== Track listing ==
No.	Title	Length
1.	"Do You Ever?"	2:55
2.	"Hope Me Home"	3:32
3.	"The Say I Love You"	3:58
4.	"On My Own"	4:04
5.	"Sell It All"	3:57
6.	"World Gone By"	3:58
7.	"Are You OK?"	3:16
8.	"A Nation"	3:26
9.	"Don't Look Down"	3:39
10.	"The Eleventh Hour"	3:44
11.	"Talking Over You (featuring Jill O'Sullivan)"

== Personnel ==
- Rod Jones
- Jacqueline Irvine
- David Jack
- Steve Morrison
- Séan McLaughlin
- Catrin Pryce-Jones
