= Owl John (album) =

Studio album by Owl John
- Released: 4 August 2014
- Studios: Atlantic Studios, Hollywood; Creature Club Studios, Echo Park; Fluorescent Egg, Laurel Canyon
- Genre: Indie rock
- Length: 35:18
- Label: Atlantic
- Producer: Andy Monaghan

Owl John is the only album by Owl John, the solo musical project by Frightened Rabbit vocalist and guitarist Scott Hutchison. It was released by Atlantic on 4 August 2014 (perhaps coincidentally, the date also being International Owl Awareness Day since 2011).

The music for the album was written and recorded on the Isle of Mull, Scotland, in early 2014, with Hutchison working with Frightened Rabbit's Andy Monaghan and Simon Liddell. He then moved to Los Angeles, where the lyrics were written and recorded. Scottish musician Peter Kelly plays drums on the album, which was mastered by Mazen Murad.

A further two tracks were recorded for the project but not included on the album: the Christmas song "It Gets Cold", released on SoundCloud under the artist name Christmas John, and "All I Want for Me Is You", which features Ed Harcourt on piano. A short instrumental track credited to Owl John, "Hailstones", was used as the soundtrack for the video piece London - Christmas Morning in December 2014; it was released as part of an album accompanying the Neu!Reekie! poetry compilation #UntitledOne in 2015.

Three music videos were released for songs from the album: "Los Angeles, Be Kind", "Hate Music" and "Red Hand". All were directed by Storme Whitby-Grubb and Charles Gibson.

In 2019, Coldplay sampled "Los Angeles, Be Kind" in their song "Champion of the World".

== Background and production ==
The Scottish indie rock band Frightened Rabbit, fronted by Scott Hutchison, released their fourth studio album Pedestrian Verse on 4 February 2013, via Atlantic. To promote the album, the band embarked on an extensive 18-month tour, during which members of Frightened Rabbit suffered from burnout. Frightened Rabbit drummer Grant Hutchison told Jason Keil of the Phoenix New Times that the band "just got run absolutely ragged" by the Pedestrian Verse touring cycle, and that they "all lost each other and ourselves a little bit" in the process.

== Reception ==
Professional ratings
Aggregate scores
Source	Rating
AnyDecentMusic?	7.2/10
Metacritic	76/100
Review scores
Source	Rating
AllMusic	4/5 stars
Clash	7/10
DIY	3/5 stars
Drowned in Sound	7/10
The Guardian	4/5 stars
The List	4/5 stars
musicOMH	3.5/5 stars
Paste	7.8/10
The Skinny	4/5 stars
Sputnikmusic	4.5/5

Owl John was met with mostly positive reviews from music critics. At Metacritic, which assigns a normalized rating out of 100 to reviews from mainstream critics, Owl John has an average score of 76 based on 13 reviews. The review aggregator AnyDecentMusic? gave the album 7.2 out of 10, based on their assessment of the critical consensus.

== In other media ==
- The Royals featured "Los Angeles, Be Kind" and "Songs About Roses" in its first season (2015).
- "Cold Creeps" appeared on the Shameless season 6 episode "Going Once, Going Twice" (January 2016).

== Track listing ==
All lyrics by Scott Hutchison and all music by Andy Monaghan, Scott Hutchison and Simon Liddell.

No.	Title	Length
1.	"Cold Creeps"	4:25
2.	"Two"	3:46
3.	"Hate Music"	2:48
4.	"Songs About Roses"	3:50
5.	"Los Angeles, Be Kind"	3:40
6.	"Ten Tons of Silence"	3:14
7.	"A Good Reason to Grow Old"	4:12
8.	"Red Hand"	3:30
9.	"Don't Take Off the Gloves"	3:24
10.	"Stupid Boy"	2:29

== Charts ==
Chart performance for Owl John
Chart (2014)	Peak position
UK Albums (Official Charts)	99
Scottish Albums (Official Charts)	5
US Heatseekers Albums (Billboard)	38
