= Frightened Rabbit =

Scottish rock band (2003–2018)

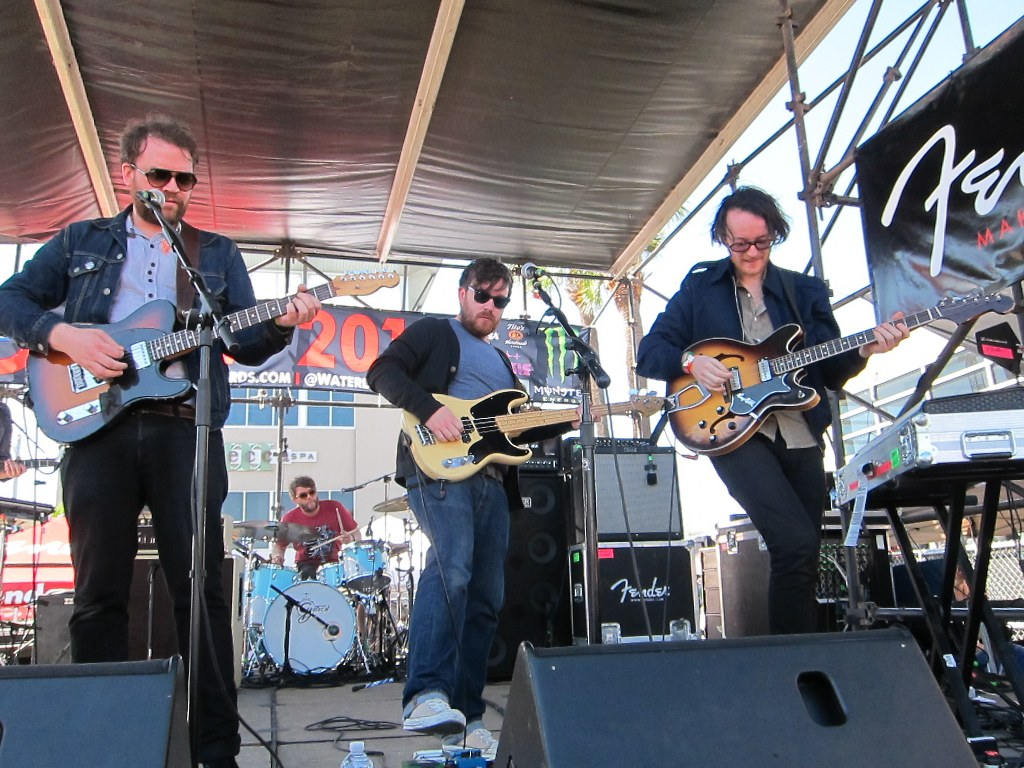
- Frightened Rabbit performing at SXSW in 2013

Background information
- Origin: Selkirk, Scottish Borders, Scotland
- Genres: Indie rock, indie folk
- Years active: 2003–2018
- Labels: Hits the Fan (2006); Fat Cat (2007–2010); Atlantic (2010–2018)
- Spinoffs: Owl John; Mastersystem
- Past members: Scott Hutchison; Grant Hutchison; Billy Kennedy; Andy Monaghan; Gordon Skene; Simon Liddell
- Website: frightenedrabbit.com

Frightened Rabbit was a Scottish indie rock band from Selkirk, formed in 2003. Initially a solo project for vocalist and guitarist Scott Hutchison, the final lineup of the band consisted of Hutchison, his brother Grant (drums), Billy Kennedy (guitar, bass), Andy Monaghan (guitar, keyboards), and Simon Liddell (guitar). Since 2004, the band was based in Glasgow.

Frightened Rabbit's first studio album, Sing the Greys, was recorded by the Hutchison brothers and Billy Kennedy, released on independent label Hits the Fan in 2006. The band subsequently signed to Fat Cat Records, in 2007, and shortly after recorded their second album The Midnight Organ Fight (2008) while guitarist and keyboardist Andy Monaghan joined.

The band's third studio album, The Winter of Mixed Drinks, was released in 2010, with guitarist Gordon Skene joining the band. Frightened Rabbit signed to Atlantic Records later that year, and issued two EPs, A Frightened Rabbit EP (2011) and State Hospital (EP) (2012). Their fourth studio album, Pedestrian Verse (2013) peaked at number nine on the UK Albums Chart, with additional guitarist Simon Liddell joining the band.

Scott Hutchison, Monaghan, and Liddell recorded a self-titled album Owl John (2014) together while Gordon Skene departed from the band. In 2015, the reconvened group recorded Painting of a Panic Attack with producer Aaron Dessner (The National), in New York, with Liddell joining the band as a full contributing member.

Scott Hutchison died by suicide in May 2018. The remaining members stated that Frightened Rabbit "no longer exists", although some music from the album that was in progress when Hutchison died may be released in the future. In December 2018 the remaining members of the band played together for the first time since Hutchison's death, at a charity gig in Glasgow with special guests performing vocals.

== History ==
=== Formation and first years (2003–2006) ===
In 2003, vocalist and guitarist Scott Hutchison used the name Frightened Rabbit, which came from a name his mother gave him in his youth due to his chronic shyness, as a stage moniker for his solo shows. The project became a full-fledged band with the addition of his brother Grant Hutchison on drums in 2004, and guitarist Billy Kennedy in 2006. Hutchinson would send out CD-R's of recordings adding biscuits to the packaging to make an impression.

=== Sing the Greys (2006–2007) ===
The band released their debut album Sing the Greys in May 2006 on a local label, Hits The Fan. The band was offered a deal from Fiction Records but ultimately the label withdrew their offer. In January 2007, The Self-Starter Foundation brought the band to the East Coast of the United States for a short tour. The band returned to the United States in March to play SXSW. Brighton indie label Fat Cat Records released a remixed/remastered version of the album in the US in October 2007, distributed by Caroline Distribution. The band then embarked on a full American tour. The album was released in the UK in November 2007.

=== The Midnight Organ Fight (2008–2009) ===
Earlier in 2007, the band had recorded a new album, The Midnight Organ Fight at producer Peter Katis's Tarquin Studios in Bridgeport, Connecticut. This album was released 15 April 2008. It was critically acclaimed, receiving an 8.1 rating on music website Pitchfork.com.

After recording The Midnight Organ Fight, the current quartet line-up was completed with the addition of guitarist/keyboardist Andy Monaghan of Piano Bar Fight (who have previously played as support to Frightened Rabbit). In an interview, Scott mentions that he "met him on New Year's Eve, in Glasgow, in a bar. I was really hammered and I was like 'why don't you come and play some shows with us man?' and he was like 'Yeah!'. The next day, I got a text like 'Do you remember… did you say something about this or is it my imagination?'".

The band supported Death Cab for Cutie during their November 2008 UK & Irish tour, and released a live album, Quietly Now! in October.

=== The Winter of Mixed Drinks (2010) ===
Whilst touring in support of The Midnight Organ Fight, Scott Hutchison noted that he was "excited at the prospect of being in the studio again", and stated that he "can't do another break-up album 'cause I haven't had one this year! Maybe it'll just be a little less focused on me".

Hutchison subsequently announced plans to head to Crail, Fife to write material for the band's third studio album:

The theme I'm going for is pushing yourself out to the edge of things and being alone, feeling lost and not knowing where you are, which is how I've felt recently. It's not all fun and games, but hopefully it'll just be less obviously personal and brutal than the last record. Less oppressive.

In May 2009, a video appeared online of Hutchison performing a new track, entitled "Swim Until You Can't See Land". The song was later revealed as the first single from the forthcoming third album.

In October 2009, the band members unveiled the album's title, The Winter of Mixed Drinks, and announced the arrival of a fifth band member, Gordon Skene (formerly of Make Model). According to Scott Hutchison:

A lot of the new record is heavily layered and it felt like too much for the four of us to do. We need another member to get them at their full impact. I dunno, we're kind of bored of each other. We just need to add some fresh meat.

The Winter of Mixed Drinks was released in March 2010.

The band made their US television debut on Late Night with Jimmy Fallon on 25 May 2010, performing "Nothing Like You". In June 2010, they appeared on The A.V. Club covering The Lemonheads. On 12 October 2010, the television crime drama Detroit 1-8-7 featured the song "Yes I Would". The first single from the album, "Swim Until You Can't See Land" was also used in the trailer for the 2010 movie, The Beaver. They were also chosen by Belle & Sebastian to perform at their second Bowlie Weekender festival, presented by All Tomorrow's Parties in the UK in December 2010. The band supported Death Cab for Cutie again during their 2011 North American tour.

=== Signing to Atlantic and A Frightened Rabbit EP (2010–2012) ===
The band's first release after signing to Atlantic, the three-track A Frightened Rabbit EP, was released on 28 July 2011 and was available exclusively on their subsequent tour. On 19 October 2011, the EP was released as a free download to subscribers to the band's newsletter, with the announcement of a limited-run vinyl being available for pre-order. The songs on the EP are "Scottish Winds", "Fuck This Place" and "The Work"; Camera Obscura's Tracyanne Campbell contributes vocals on "Fuck This Place", and Archie Fisher sings on "The Work". The EP was re-issued on vinyl for the first time since its original release for Record Store Day 2022.

In 2010, Scott Hutchison wrote, recorded and performed with the charity project The Fruit Tree Foundation, appearing on its debut album, First Edition.

=== Pedestrian Verse (2013) ===
On 6 December 2011, Clash Music reported that Frightened Rabbit were planning to record their fourth album, and Scott Hutchison states, "it's written, essentially," noting that they are on the production stage. Scott states, "We're experimenting with minor keys, which is actually new for us," remarking upon the idea of a new sound. The band announced that on 1 May 2012 they would start recording the fourth album.

The fourth album also marked the first time for the band that it is not Scott Hutchison alone with the task of songwriting, with Hutchison saying that "it's done nothing but benefit the new songs." The album was released on 4 February 2013, and was preceded by an EP entitled State Hospital, featuring Scottish vocalist Aidan Moffat, released 25 September 2012.

On tour in 2012 for support of State Hospital, Scott announced that the album would be released in February 2013. In November 2012, Frightened Rabbit announced the name of their new album, Pedestrian Verse, via their official Facebook page. Released to widespread critical acclaim, the band embarked upon an extensive tour in support of the album.

=== Owl John and Gordon Skene's departure (2014–2015) ===
Regarding a forthcoming fifth studio album, Hutchison noted in October 2013: "We're going to have to start thinking about the next record after this tour. We've done a lot of writing in Scotland, but it would be good to shift it up a gear and get out of the comfort zone, away from what we're used to, and over [in America] would be good for that. So the only worry, especially on the West Coast and California, is the effect that may have on my writing, and whether I would be all happy and full of vitamins."

In January 2014, Scott Hutchison revealed plans to record a solo album, stating: "With Pedestrian Verse being more collaborative, I said I’d never write a Frightened Rabbit record in the way I used to, which is true. But it doesn’t mean I don’t want to write any records like that. It’s going to be really pleasant to go back to that way of working, where I sit around and do stuff myself." Both keyboardist and guitarist Andy Monaghan and touring member Simon Liddell collaborated with Scott on the project, which was later named Owl John.

On 25 March 2014, Gordon Skene departed the band owing to "differing opinions" with the four other members. The band wrote on Facebook: "There is no more to tell other than sometimes things just don’t work out and when people have differing opinions often the best option is to simply part ways and get on with life separately."

=== Painting of a Panic Attack (2016–2017) ===
Frightened Rabbit announced via social media their fifth album, Painting of a Panic Attack, would be released on 8 April 2016. The band followed the album news with an album trailer showcasing album track 'Lump Street', and UK/US 2016–2017 tour announcement on 23 February.

Frightened Rabbit released a new song "Fields of Wheat" on 11 July 2017, with the band stating, "We made this recently. It felt like the song should go out now, because it's about what's happening now." In late 2017, the band released a three-track EP entitled Recorded Songs, which featured a collaboration with musician Julien Baker.

=== Sixth album plans and death of Scott Hutchison (2018–2019) ===
In early 2018, Scott and Grant announced a new side-project called Mastersystem alongside Justin and James Lockey of Editors and Minor Victories respectively. The band released their debut album Dance Music on 4 April.

In February and March 2018, Frightened Rabbit embarked upon a ten-year anniversary tour in support of The Midnight Organ Fight. Regarding the possibility of new material and a possible sixth studio album, Scott noted that the band were building a home studio in Glasgow, and working on songs: "We've got like five or six songs that are sketchy. Then there are a lot of pieces of music that don't have lyrics on them yet, but that's coming together. I would like for that to be finished by the end of the year. We're just going to constantly evolve it. I've been certainly trying to look for new themes. There's one that's currently about how I question whether or not I would be willing to bring a child into the world as it stands. Not that I'm in any position to do so at all, but you know ... I'm trying to find different things cause it's album six, and I can't do this all time time, you know. I don't think anybody really gives a fuck about my relationships any more. So yeah, I'll try and steer clear of that".

On 9 May 2018, Scott Hutchison was reported missing by Scottish police and the members of Frightened Rabbit. Hutchison was last seen early on the morning of 9 May leaving a hotel in South Queensferry. His brother and band-mate Grant, on the band's official Twitter account, urged anyone with information on his whereabouts to contact Police Scotland. On 10 May, police found a body at Port Edgar in South Queensferry, which was the next day confirmed to be Hutchison's.

The band issued a statement following Hutchison's death:

There are no words to describe the overwhelming sadness and pain that comes with the death of our beloved Scott, but to know he is no longer suffering brings us some comfort. Reading messages of support and hope from those he has helped through his art has helped immensely and we encourage you all to continue doing this. He will be missed by all of us and his absence will always be felt but he leaves a legacy of hope, kindness and colour that will forever be remembered and shared. Rest peacefully Scott. Much love.

— Grant, Billy, Andy and Simon,

On 25 May, the band announced they had cancelled their First Incident festival, which had been due to take place on 1 June in Glasgow and would have featured them in a headlining performance. Grant Hutchison tweeted that fans who had purchased tickets would be refunded or could donate their money the Scottish Association for Mental Health in Scott's memory if they so wished.

In August 2018, the band announced they would be performing at the Sleep in the Park charity event in Glasgow on 8 December, which would be their first concert since Hutchison's death. The band performed eight songs at the concert, and were joined by guest singers James Graham of The Twilight Sad, Ross Clark of Three Blind Wolves and Fiskur, Simon Neil of Biffy Clyro and Kathryn Joseph.

In May 2019, the Hutchison family established Tiny Changes, a mental health charity named after a lyric from the band's song "Head Rolls Off", in memory of Scott. In July 2019, Atlantic Records released Tiny Changes: A Celebration of Frightened Rabbit's The Midnight Organ Fight, an album featuring musician friends and colleagues of the band covering their 2008 album in full. It was supposed to be released in summer 2018 to mark the tenth anniversary of The Midnight Organ Fight, and Scott Hutchison was fully involved in the process and had approved the tracks included. In the run-up to the covers album's release, the remaining members of the band gave several interviews, stating that "the band does not exist" without Scott. It was also mentioned that there were demos already recorded for the band's planned sixth album and that these materials may still be released by the band.

In January 2022, following the release of the lyrics book, The Work, Grant Hutchison noted that the band could work on Scott's sixth album demos in the near future: "I think we do feel like maybe [this] year at some point we could either sit in a room or just separately pick up our instruments and play along to those demos and maybe revisit them and get them out there. Whether it’s in an album format or whether we just decide to release them as we feel they’re ready, I think we feel a responsibility there to kind of finish off unfinished work for sure."

== Band line-up ==
Concerning the band's line-up, Scott Hutchison noted in 2008: "The initial lineup in Frightened Rabbit was just myself. I had really only been messing with my 4 track for about 6 months before I started playing some shows on my own. Some of the songs still didn't have words and I was mostly just mumbling nonsense half the time. Grant joined a year later, making the outfit much noisier. Billy came along about 6 months after this and actually made it a bit less noisy. He's very calming like that is Billy. Andy has been in the band since January, and adds all the extra details we were missing before. Still not sure if we're finished gathering members".

In 2009, Make Model band member Gordon Skene joined Frightened Rabbit, playing their first live show with Skene on 6 November 2009. His departure from the band was announced on 25 March 2014.

=== Band members ===
- Scott Hutchison – lead vocals, rhythm guitar (2003–2018; died 2018)
- Grant Hutchison – drums, percussion, backing vocals (2004–2018)
- Billy Kennedy – lead guitar, bass guitar, keyboards, backing vocals (2005–2018)
- Andy Monaghan – guitar, keyboards, bass guitar, backing vocals (2008–2018)
- Gordon Skene – guitar, keyboards, backing vocals (2009–2014)
- Simon Liddell – guitar, keyboards (2014–2018; touring member 2013–2014)

== Charitable work ==
Frightened Rabbit did extensive work with the Invisible Children music coalition project, taking representatives of the group on tour with them in 2011 to raise awareness of the charity's work. They performed songs for them, including a cover of the Death Cab For Cutie song, "Different Names for the Same Thing", as well as performing the song "Scottish Winds", from their new EP. At the end of the tour, they auctioned off the guitar they played during the tour, signed by the members, and the proceeds went to Invisible Children. In 2015, Frightened Rabbit raised money for Ditch the Label, a UK anti-bullying charity, after receiving messages from an internet troll. In 2017, the band performed at the Sleep in the Park charity event, raising money for homelessness charities in Scotland. They were scheduled to perform again in 2018; after the death of Scott Hutchison, the band played at the event with guest vocalists.

== Discography ==
Studio albums

- Sing the Greys (2006)
- The Midnight Organ Fight (2008)
- The Winter of Mixed Drinks (2010)
- Pedestrian Verse (2013)
- Painting of a Panic Attack (2016)
