= Right on Dynamite =

American indie rock band

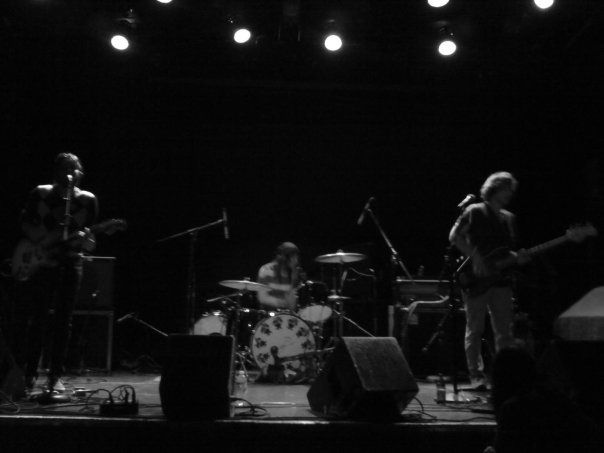
- Performing at Bowery Ballroom, New York, October 2009

Background information
- Origin: Greenpoint, New York
- Genres: Indie rock, grunge
- Years active: 2006–present
- Labels: Standpipe (2007-2009); Mecca Lecca, Wharf Cat (2011)
- Members: Daniel Murphy; Nicholas Cirillo; Jon Molina
- Website: www.wearerightondynamite.com

Right on Dynamite is an American indie rock band from Brooklyn, New York, and has been based in the Greenpoint section since their inception in 2006. Their lineup consists of guitarist and main vocalist Daniel Murphy, Nicholas Cirillo on bass and vocals and Jon Molina on drums. While touring with Frightened Rabbit in 2009 New York Magazine covered the band calling them "the Human Sexual Behavior of New York rock, perfectly adolescent yet surprisingly deep."

The Brooklyn-based trio consists of high school friends and their brand of rock has drawn comparisons to Dinosaur Jr, Sonic Youth and even Weezer and The Cribs. They have received the attention of many important people, including Spin, NME, Blackbook, NY Mag, Time Out and many other publications all giving their attention. The band has also toured the U.S. with Frightened Rabbit and The Hold Steady at those bands’ request.

Right on Dynamite's song "Mantra for the Madness" was featured in the episode "Midnight Clear" on the ABC Family show, Greek.

Their debut album was slated for a late 2011 release and was mixed by John Agnello. Right on Dynamite were last seen in the music video for Frightened Rabbit's song "The Woodpile."

== Discography ==
- "Won't Let It Go" / "Wrong Too Right" (Single) (2007)
- Right on Dynamite EP (2009)
- "Alright" (Single) (2009)
- Duck EP (2011)
- In Vino Veritas (2011)
