= Sing the Greys =

Studio album by Frightened Rabbit
- Released: 5 June 2006
- Recorded: The Diving Bell Lounge, Glasgow
- Genre: Indie rock
- Length: 34:46
- Labels: Hits the Fan (2006); FatCat (2007)
- Producers: Marcus MacKay; Frightened Rabbit

Frightened Rabbit chronology
Sing the Greys (2006)	The Midnight Organ Fight (2008)

Singles from Sing the Greys
- 1. "Be Less Rude" Released: 5 November 2007; 2. "The Greys" Released: 5 November 2007

Professional ratings
Review scores
Source	Rating
AllMusic	3.5/5 stars
Drowned in Sound	(7/10)
NME	(8/10) (17 November 2007, p.53)
Pitchfork	(7.5/10)

Sing the Greys is the debut studio album by Scottish indie rock band Frightened Rabbit, originally released in May 2006 on Hits the Fan Records, with a limited run of 1000 copies. A remixed/remastered version was released in the United States by FatCat Records on 2 October 2007 and in the UK on 17 November 2007.

In an interview concerning the record's re-release in 2007, vocalist, guitarist and cover artist Scott Hutchison stated: "Little bits and pieces [were] re-recorded. We've re-amped some of the drums in different rooms to get an ambience about it. It's louder and everything is fuller and bigger." By the end of 2007, he said the band was "pretty sick of Sing the Greys. We were saying goodbye to that record and just really itching for people to hear the new one."

In the first interview, drummer Grant Hutchison said: "Fat Cat were just going to release it on a low scale as a taster for the new album. But when we remixed and mastered it, it sounded like a proper album and we felt those songs were too good to just brush under carpet."

Sing the Greys entered the Scottish Albums Chart for the first time in 2018, following Hutchison's death.

== Track listing ==
All tracks are written by Frightened Rabbit.

No.	Title	Length
1.	"The Greys"	2:41
2.	"Music Now"	4:12
3.	"The First Incident"	1:48
4.	"Yawns"	3:19
5.	"Be Less Rude"	3:01
6.	"The Second Incident"	1:20
7.	"Go-Go-Girls"	3:34
8.	"Behave!"	3:28
9.	"Square 9"	5:16
10.	"The Final Incident"	0:47
11.	"Snake..."	2:32
Total length:		34:46

Bonus track on remastered version
No.	Title	Length
12.	"The Greys" (live)	2:48

== Personnel ==
- Scott Hutchison – lead vocals, rhythm guitar
- Grant Hutchison – drums, percussion, backing vocals
- Billy Kennedy – guitar, bass guitar, keyboards, backing vocals

Technical personnel

- Marcus Mackay – production, mixing
- Alan Douches – mastering

Other credits

- Scott Hutchison – artwork
- D. Thomas – layout design
- Catherine C. Williamson – layout design

== Charts ==
Chart (2018)	Peak position
Scottish Albums (Official Charts)	24
