= Pedestrian Verse =

Studio album by Frightened Rabbit
- Released: 4 February 2013
- Studios: Monnow Valley Studio, Rockfield, Monmouthshire
- Genre: Indie rock
- Length: 42:28
- Label: Atlantic
- Producer: Leo Abrahams

Frightened Rabbit chronology
State Hospital (EP) (2012)	Pedestrian Verse (2013)	Painting of a Panic Attack (2016)

Singles from Pedestrian Verse
- 1. "State Hospital" Released: 1 August 2012; 2. "The Woodpile" Released: 14 December 2012; 3. "Backyard Skulls" Released: 1 April 2013; 4. "Late March, Death March" Released: 31 May 2013

Pedestrian Verse is the fourth studio album by the Scottish indie rock band Frightened Rabbit, released on 4 February 2013 on Atlantic Records. Produced by Leo Abrahams and the band itself, it is the only studio album to feature guitarist and keyboardist Gordon Skene, who departed from Frightened Rabbit following the album's accompanying tour.

Partly inspired by a break-up, the album features increased songwriting contributions from each member of the band.

== Background ==
Frightened Rabbit released their third studio album, The Winter of Mixed Drinks, on 1 March 2010 through independent label FatCat Records. That November, the band signed to Atlantic Records. In the official statement from drummer Grant Hutchison, the band planned to take time off from touring to write new material. Their first release through Atlantic was A Frightened Rabbit EP, a three-track extended play that was made available for digital download on 19 October 2011.

A Frightened Rabbit EP was followed by the five-track EP State Hospital, released on 24 September 2012. While an acoustic version of the title track was leaked online early, the studio version debuted on 15 August 2012 on Zane Lowe's BBC Radio 1 program. An official music video for the song, directed by Hand Held Cine Club, was released on 20 August. Out of the five tracks on the EP, only the title track would appear on Pedestrian Verse. In a statement, frontman Scott Hutchison said that every song on the EP had been considered for the album, but that "certain songs just don't fit in to an album".

== Writing and recording ==
Pedestrian Verse differed from the recording of the band's other records in that songs were written and practised while on tour, rather than having the songs being novel when recording was commenced, giving the songs a more "worn-in" feel, rather than an "edgy" one. The record also marked the first instance of lead songwriter Scott Hutchison sharing the role with the rest of the band. As a result, Hutchison has stated that Pedestrian Verse is the best record that the band has produced.

In the writing of the album, Hutchison initially set out to create songs with broader subject matter, rather than just referring to his personal relationships. However, during the process of writing the album, Hutchison experienced another break-up, found that "it was all he could think about," leaving the record with a more "personal" section.

The title of the album is taken from a line in the song "State Hospital", which features as track 9 on the album.

== Release and promotion ==
On 7 November 2012, Frightened Rabbit announced the details of their upcoming album, including the title, cover art, release date, and track listing. The first track for Pedestrian Verse, "Dead Now", was released on 20 November 2012, and accompanied by a video filmed during their last United States tour. Follow-up single "The Woodpile" debuted on Zane Lowe's show on 11 December, with a music video released the next day. "The Woodpile" was officially released as a single on 28 January. Pedestrian Verse was released on 4 February 2013.

On 22 February, Frightened Rabbit released a music video for new single "Backyard Skulls", depicting the band performing in a high school gymnasium after a school dance. They followed this with two non-album singles. The first was a cover of the Scottish folk song "Norland Wind", originally performed by Jim Reid using lyrics from a poem by Violet Jacobs. The cover, featuring Lau, was made available for pre-order on 21 March 2013, and was available as a limited physical release for Record Store Day. The second, "Architect", was a Record Store Day promotional track in collaboration with Manchester Orchestra, released on 20 April 2013. Additionally, Frightened Rabbit released the Backyard Skulls extended play on 31 March, featuring the title track, alternate versions of Pedestrian Verse tracks "The Woodpile" and "Holy", and a live performance of "Acts of Man".

== Reception ==
Professional ratings
Aggregate scores
Source	Rating
AnyDecentMusic?	7.6/10
Metacritic	79/100
Review scores
Source	Rating
AllMusic	4/5 stars
The A.V. Club	A
The Guardian	4/5 stars
The Irish Times	4/5 stars
Mojo	3/5 stars
NME	8/10
Pitchfork	7.6/10
Q	4/5 stars
Spin	7/10
Uncut	7/10

Critical response to Pedestrian Verse has been positive. At Metacritic, which assigns a normalized rating out of 100 to reviews from mainstream music critics, the album received an average score of 79, based on 26 reviews, which indicates "Generally favorable reviews". Nick Meredith of The Underclassed gave the album a positive review stating that "Not only has their style diversified, they have managed to blend all the good things from their previous offerings into one cohesive album". It won Scottish music website The Pop Cop's annual Best Album award.

== Track listing ==
All songs written by Frightened Rabbit, lyrics written by Scott Hutchison.

Standard edition
No.	Title	Length
1.	"Acts of Man"	4:54
2.	"Backyard Skulls"	3:09
3.	"Holy"	3:39
4.	"The Woodpile"	3:27
5.	"Late March, Death March"	4:02
6.	"December's Traditions"	4:09
7.	"Housing (in)"	1:30
8.	"Dead Now"	4:08
9.	"State Hospital"	4:37
10.	"Nitrous Gas"	3:10
11.	"Housing (out)"	1:04
12.	"The Oil Slick"	4:39

Deluxe edition bonus tracks
No.	Title	Length
13.	"If You Were Me"	2:55
14.	"Snow Still Melting"	3:27
15.	"Escape Route"	3:29

== Personnel ==
- Scott Hutchison - lead vocals, rhythm guitar
- Billy Kennedy - lead guitar, keyboards, backing vocals, additional bass
- Andy Monaghan - bass guitar, additional guitar, keyboards, backing vocals
- Gordan Skene - guitar, keyboards, backing vocals
- Grant Hutchison - drums, percussion, backing vocals

=== Production ===
- Produced by Leo Abrahams
- Mixed by Craig Silvey
- Artwork and photography by Scott Hutchison, dlt, and Joby Barnard.

== Charts ==
Chart performance for Pedestrian Verse
Chart (2013)	Peak position
Irish Albums (IRMA)	49
Scottish Albums (Official Charts)	2
UK Albums (Official Charts)	9
US Billboard 200	63
US Top Rock Albums (Billboard)	19
US Top Alternative Albums (Billboard)	15
