= A Frightened Rabbit EP =

EP by Frightened Rabbit
- Released: 31 October 2011
- Recorded: 2011
- Genre: Indie rock
- Label: Atlantic Records
- Producer: Frightened Rabbit

Frightened Rabbit chronology
The Winter of Mixed Drinks (2010)	A Frightened Rabbit EP (2011)	State Hospital (2012)

A Frightened Rabbit EP is an EP by Scottish indie rock band Frightened Rabbit, released on 31 October 2011 on Atlantic Records as a free download and on ten-inch, limited edition vinyl. Self-produced by the band, A Frightened Rabbit EP was the band's first release on Atlantic, and the first to feature contributions from guitarist Gordon Skene.

The EP features guest appearances from Camera Obscura vocalist Tracyanne Campbell and singer-songwriter Archie Fisher.

== Writing and composition ==
On the band's official website, vocalist and guitarist Scott Hutchison released a "track by track" guide to the EP, with Hutchison stating that the opening track, "Scottish Winds", was written almost entirely in his head. "I think the initial nugget came from the fact that it was an extremely windy day. [...] I didn’t have an instrument to hand and would never start strumming one out on a bus, so to speak. So I wrote the lyrics out on my phone and when I got to the cottage I picked up a guitar and it was just sort of... there."

Regarding "Fuck This Place", Hutchison noted, "When it came to the writing, I had two parts in my head all along. I have been a big Camera Obscura fan for a long time and when Tracyanne said she’d be up for this, I was incredibly chuffed and her vocal is just beautiful. It’s fairly obvious what it’s about, though I don’t think it’s necessarily a love story."

The EP's final track is a duet between Hutchison and singer-songwriter Archie Fisher. Hutchison stated, "It was such an honour to work with Archie. He’s a real Scottish legend, and my mum and dad couldn’t believe I was singing with one of their heroes. When I listen to this one, I think of the great day I spent at his house, mulling over the tune and listening to all his hilarious stories. A real privilege."

== Track listing ==
All songs written by Frightened Rabbit, except where noted.

1. "Scottish Winds"
2. "Fuck This Place"
3. "The Work" (Hutchison/Fisher)

== Personnel ==
=== Frightened Rabbit ===
- Scott Hutchison - lead vocals, guitar
- Grant Hutchison - drums, percussion, backing vocals
- Billy Kennedy - guitar, bass guitar, backing vocals
- Andy Monaghan - guitar, keyboards, backing vocals
- Gordon Skene - guitar, keyboards, backing vocals

=== Additional musicians ===
- Tracyanne Campbell - vocals ("Fuck This Place")
- Archie Fisher - vocals, guitar ("The Work")

=== Recording personnel ===
- Frightened Rabbit - producer
- Marcus MacKay - engineer, mixing

=== Artwork ===
- Scott Hutchison

== Charts ==
Chart (2022)	Peak position
Hungary (Single Top 40)	4
