= Grant Hutchison =

Scottish musician (born 1984)

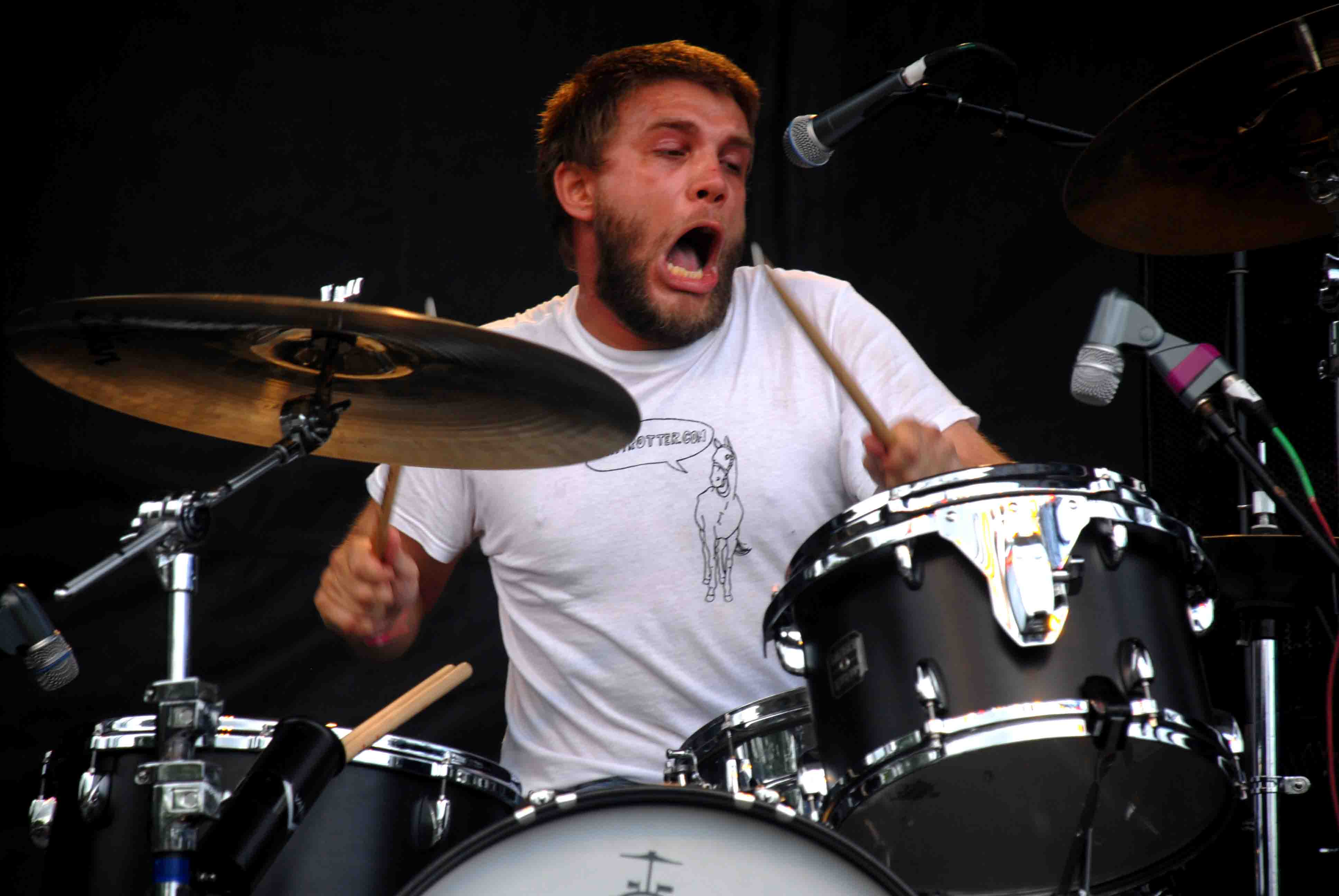
- Hutchison in 2007

Background information
- Born: 13 June 1984 (age 42); Selkirk, Scottish Borders, Scotland
- Genres: Indie rock, indie folk
- Occupation: Drummer
- Instruments: Drums, percussion, vocals
- Years active: 2004–present
- Labels: Atlantic, Fat Cat
- Formerly of: Frightened Rabbit, The Twilight Sad

Grant Hutchison (born 13 June 1984) is a Scottish drummer and percussionist. He is best known as the drummer of the indie rock band Frightened Rabbit, with whom he recorded five studio albums. In 2022, Hutchison joined The Twilight Sad after a four-year hiatus from performing, following the death of his brother and bandmate Scott Hutchison, and played with the band throughout their 2023 tours with The Cure.

Frightened Rabbit began as a solo project for Grant's brother Scott, him joining in 2004. The duo recorded the band's debut album, Sing the Greys (2006). Hutchison performed on each of the band's releases, and contributed to the songwriting process of the band's fourth studio album, Pedestrian Verse (2013).

In 2018, the Hutchison brothers formed the supergroup Mastersystem with James and Justin Lockey, releasing a studio album, Dance Music (2018).

== Early life ==
Hutchison was raised in Selkirk, Scotland with his older brothers Scott and Neil. Reflecting upon his mother's nickname for Scott, "Frightened Rabbit", which ultimately became the namesake of their future band, he stated: "I'd just get called 'The Bairn' on account of me being the youngest. There'd have been no way that I'd have ever been compared to a frightened rabbit when I was growing up – I was something more akin to Warner Brothers’ Tasmanian Devil. I was the polar opposite to Scott."

== Music career ==
=== With Frightened Rabbit ===
In 2004, Hutchison, now living in Glasgow, joined his brother Scott in Frightened Rabbit, rendering them a two-piece band. Describing his entry into the band, Grant stated, "Scott started playing solo shows supporting friends' bands in Glasgow with just an acoustic guitar. I was the only drummer he knew, so I got the job of being the second member of Frightened Rabbit. Basically, I joined to make the whole thing a little bit noisier!" Grant and Scott subsequently recorded the band's 2006 debut album, Sing the Greys, with producer Marcus MacKay on his own label, Hits the Fan.

Regarding his aspirations during the band's early days, Hutchison noted: "When we first started, my measure of success was selling out King Tut's in Glasgow, and then being signed to Fat Cat and, more recently, getting the top ten album. Hopefully, I never get to the stage where I can say “We’ve arrived” because I would never want to settle with what we have achieved."

The band's two subsequent studio albums, The Midnight Organ Fight (2008) and The Winter of Mixed Drinks (2010), expanded the band's fanbase significantly. The album's tracks stemmed from Scott's fully formed songs, with Grant describing the writing process as "Scott [starting] the whole process off by writing the songs himself on an acoustic guitar, and then I chip in with some drum ideas, and then we sort of figure it out from there."

During the writing and recording process for the band's fourth studio album, Pedestrian Verse (2013), Scott Hutchison opened up the songwriting process to include Grant and the other members of the band. Grant stated: "The writing process was different. We were all involved from the beginning. So, I had a lot more input with this one, helping shape songs and taking them in different directions. It's great to be a part of that, to have a real impact on the songs. In the past, I’ve mostly just played drums along with fully formed songs. This time, I was playing along with very basic minimal tracks that Scott would lay down, and many times, it wouldn't even have a melody yet. So that was new for me. It was great." The band's fifth studio album, Painting of a Panic Attack, was released in 2016.

In 2018, Hutchison played alongside Scott and brothers Justin and James Lockey on the sole album from the project Mastersystem.

Scott's death in May 2018 effectively brought Frightened Rabbit to an end as a working band. However, Hutchison appeared behind the drums as a Frightened Rabbit member later that year: with fellow band member Billy Kennedy at the Belladrum Festival as part of a tribute by The Charlatans, and with the band featuring guest vocalists as part of the Glasgow charity event Sleep in the Park, in December 2018.

=== Other work ===
In 2013, Hutchison mentioned the possibility of working on his own material, stating: "I'm hoping to maybe get something started with some friends back in Glasgow when I get home. I've spoken to someone about that recently. I've got some songs I've been working on. I think it'd be nice to do something else, not because I don't like [playing in Frightened Rabbit]. I absolutely love it, but it'd be nice to have something else, too".

In 2018, Hutchison appeared on Let's Be Wilderness, the second album by Postdata. In 2019 he and fellow Frightened Rabbit member Simon Liddell accompanied Australian musician Gretta Ray on her UK dates.

In 2026, Hutchison drummed on music from Fountain Road, the new solo project of fellow Frightened Rabbit member Andy Monaghan.

== In the food and drink industry ==
Regarding potential career options were he not a member of Frightened Rabbit, Hutchison had noted: "I have no qualifications to do anything else, so I'd probably be working in a cheese shop or trying to make my own cider. It's difficult to think about that because everything I have managed to do because of Frightened Rabbit has made me who I am now, and I can't really say where I would be without it". Following the end of the band, in 2019, Hutchison launched a cider import and distribution company, Re:stalk.

In 2021, Hutchison and his wife Jaye opened Aeble, a cider bottle shop and event hub in Anstruther. In 2026 the couple set up a cider festival in Leith titled The Ubhal Cider Gathering. In July of that year they announced the closure of Aeble after five years, as well as their involvement with nearby new venture Bonn Pizza.

== Personal life ==
Hutchison has praised his and Scott's parents for their support with Frightened Rabbit, noting: "I will always be eternally in debt to my parents for being so supportive when things weren't so rosy with the band. Whenever I need them, they are there, and they're just as important in the band's progress as Scott and myself."

Hutchison and wife Jaye married in 2018 and have two daughters, born in 2020 and 2023. They live in the East Neuk.

Hutchison is a supporter of the Cystinosis Foundation UK and was a trustee of the mental health charity Tiny Changes, set up by his family in 2019 following the death of his brother Scott. He has participated in several charity sports events, including The Great Big Cycle (2014) and the Great Scottish Run half-marathon in Glasgow (2018).

== Discography ==
with Frightened Rabbit

- Sing the Greys (2006)
- The Midnight Organ Fight (2008)
- The Winter of Mixed Drinks (2010)
- Pedestrian Verse (2013)
- Painting of a Panic Attack (2016)

with Mastersystem

- Dance Music (2018)
