= State Hospital (EP) =

EP by Frightened Rabbit
- Released: 24 September 2012
- Genre: Indie rock
- Label: Atlantic Records
- Producer: Leo Abrahams and Frightened Rabbit

Frightened Rabbit chronology
A Frightened Rabbit EP (2011)	State Hospital (2012)	Pedestrian Verse (2013)

Frightened Rabbit singles chronology
"The Loneliness and the Scream" (2010)	"State Hospital" (2012)	"The Woodpile" (2013)

Professional ratings
Review scores
Source	Rating
Allmusic	3.5/5 stars

State Hospital is an EP by Scottish indie rock band Frightened Rabbit, released on 24 September 2012 on Atlantic Records. Produced by both Leo Abrahams and the band itself, the EP includes the single, "State Hospital", alongside four tracks written and recorded in contention for the band's fourth studio album, Pedestrian Verse.

The EP's final track, "Wedding Gloves", is a collaboration with former Arab Strap vocalist Aidan Moffat.

== Background and recording ==
In early 2012, Frightened Rabbit performed a number of small-scale, secret shows in order to preview new material the band had been working on. Amongst the new tracks performed were "State Hospital" and "Boxing Night", with the band continuing to perform these tracks, amongst others, during a tour of the Scottish Highlands. Regarding this tour, Hutchison noted, "I like the idea that some of the audience will know the songs and the band, but there's often an atmosphere of, 'There's a band in town, let's go to see them and see what they're like'. If you've got some people in that you need to bring round and onto your music then that's one of my favourite challenges."

The band subsequently entered the studio in May 2012, with producer Leo Abrahams, to begin recording their fourth studio album.

In September 2012, the band announced the release of State Hospital, featuring material written and recorded for their forthcoming album. The title track was announced as its accompanying single, and is set to appear on the band's fourth studio album. The other four songs are exclusive to this release, with the band noting, "I suppose certain songs just don’t fit in to an album, but we thought these four still deserved to be given more than simply ‘B-side’ status."

== Writing and composition ==
Regarding the EP's final four tracks, and their exclusion from their forthcoming album, the band stated, "We had been writing and demo-ing for this record for some time, we found ourselves sitting on a lot of songs at the beginning of the year. Too many really, if there is such a thing. You’ll be glad to hear that we didn’t even toy with the idea of a double album, probably because we weren’t taking any drugs."

Guitarist and vocalist Scott Hutchison stated that the track, "Boxing Night", is thematically linked to the band's second studio album, The Midnight Organ Fight (2008), which dealt with the aftermath of a romantic break-up. Hutchison noted, "Some of the lyrics are pretty old actually, and for me it has a lot in common with much of The Midnight Organ Fight material, sonically and thematically, which is probably why it felt a bit weird sitting on the new album."

The track, "Home from War", grew from a vocal idea Hutchison had recorded on his mobile phone; "[The track] was one of the only times I have succeeded in making a full song out of a ten second voice memo. I sing into my phone fairly often to note down ideas, but upon listening back at a later date it’s usually indecipherable and very often shite. This melody stuck though, and it formed the basis of the entire song."

Regarding the EP's fourth track, "Off", Hutchison noted, "One day last year I was rifling through a pile of old receipts and amongst them I found the lyrics to "Off", written on the back of an invoice of some sort. I had completely forgotten about it, and may well have thrown it out were it not for Her Majesty’s Revenue and Customs’ demands."

The EP's final track is a collaboration with Aidan Moffat, with Hutchison stating, "To have him collaborate on this song was just incredible as I had already been heavily influenced by his lyrics whilst we were writing the new record. It’s two voices telling the same story from the same perspective and it’s a reasonably common tale: a husband and wife find themselves bored with one another, but still manage to find a way to make things more, ahem, interesting… This song ties in well with some of the themes visited in "State Hospital", as I was starting at this point to write about the lives of others, as opposed to my own."

== Reception ==
Drowned in Sound gave the EP a positive review, stating, "State Hospital is the sound of a band renewed, invigorated and impassioned and pretty damned far from selling out. [...] Even if [these tracks are b-sides], these 20 minutes are of a higher quality than many, many bands manage in a whole career." This Is Fake DIY also gave the EP a positive review, stating, "This is an album's cutting room floor yet each song still retains Hutchison's instantly recognisable Scottish drawl, infectious hooks and intelligent lyrics."

== Track listing ==
All songs written by Frightened Rabbit, except where noted.

1. "State Hospital" - 4:37
2. "Boxing Night" - 3:49
3. "Home from War" - 3:41
4. "Off" - 2:54
5. "Wedding Gloves" - 5:18 (Frightened Rabbit/Aidan Moffat)

== Personnel ==
=== Frightened Rabbit ===
- Scott Hutchison – lead vocals, guitar
- Grant Hutchison – drums, percussion, backing vocals
- Billy Kennedy – guitar, bass guitar, backing vocals
- Andy Monaghan – guitar, keyboards, backing vocals
- Gordon Skene – guitar, keyboards, backing vocals

=== Additional personnel ===
- Aidan Moffat – vocals (5)

=== Recording personnel ===
- Leo Abrahams – producer (1 and 2)
- Frightened Rabbit – producer (3, 4 and 5)
- Craig Silvey – mixing (1 and 2)
- Bryan Wilson – mixing (3, 4 and 5)

=== Artwork ===
- Scott Hutchison – artwork, photography
- Louisa Swan – silver cross
- Alan Wood – knife engraving

== Charts ==
Chart	Peak position
UK Albums Chart	53
