= Archie Fisher =

Scottish folk singer and songwriter (1939–2025)

Archie Fisher MBE
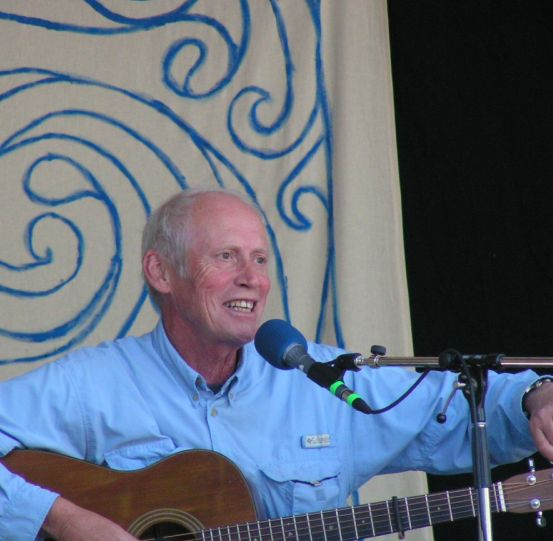
- Fisher in 2006

Background information
- Born: Archie Macdonald Fisher; 23 October 1939; Glasgow, Scotland
- Died: 1 November 2025 (aged 86)
- Occupations: Singer, songwriter, guitarist, radio personality
- Award: Member of the Order of the British Empire

Archie Macdonald Fisher MBE (23 October 1939 – 1 November 2025) was a Scottish folk singer and songwriter. He released several solo albums since his first, eponymous album, in 1968. Fisher composed the song "The Final Trawl", recorded on the album Windward Away, that several other groups and singers, including The Clancy Brothers, have also recorded. Starting in the mid-1970s, he produced four folk albums with Makem and Clancy. He also performed with them and other groups as a backup singer and guitarist. Fisher hosted his own radio show on BBC Radio Scotland for almost three decades.

== Early life ==
Archie Fisher was born in Glasgow on 23 October 1939, into a large singing family. His sister Cilla Fisher is also a professional singer, as was his late sister Ray. In 1960, he moved to Edinburgh and appeared regularly at "The Howff" folk club run by Roy Guest. In 1962, Ray and Archie released the single "Far Over the Forth" on the Topic Records label and appeared on the BBC's Hoot'nanny Show. In 1966, Fisher and five of his six sisters released the album The Fisher Family: Traditional & New Songs from Scotland.

== Edinburgh Folk Festival ==
By 1964, the Edinburgh Fringe could boast a folk festival in its own right. An album of the participants was released on Decca. It was called Edinburgh Folk Festival vol 2 and contained tracks by Ray Fisher, Archie Fisher, Anne Briggs and the Ian Campbell Folk Group (including Dave Swarbrick). Bert Jansch and Briggs performed together but this was never recorded. At an early-stage Fisher recognised the power of Barbara Dickson's singing and in 1969 invited her to guest on his albums. His live act included 'All Around My Hat', later to become a hit for Steeleye Span. His song "Witch of the Westmorland" was recorded by Dickson in 1971 on her album From the Beggar's Mantle, by Fisher himself on The Man With a Rhyme in 1976, by Stan Rogers in 1979 and by Golden Bough in 1983.

== Comeback ==
In 1983, Fisher started hosting the long running BBC Radio Scotland folk programme Travelling Folk. He retired in April 2010, handing over presenting duties to fiddler Bruce MacGregor. He appeared as the lead guitarist on Tom Paxton's 1986 album, The Very Best of Tom Paxton, and performed with Tommy Makem and Liam Clancy on television, recordings and concert tours. He also produced the Irish duo's first four albums, Tommy Makem & Liam Clancy (1976), The Makem & Clancy Concert (1977), Two for the Early Dew (1978) and The Makem & Clancy Collection (1980). After Barbara Dickson achieved fame as an easy listening singer, it was many years before she sang folk songs again. When she did, Fisher was invited back to join her.

Fisher toured Canada and the US as a solo act as well as appearing with Garnet Rogers and with John Renbourn. His style of singing is very gentle, and he generally avoids all electronic instruments, an exception is the recording of 'The last time I saw Esau Shaw' from the album 'Orfeo'. "Dark-Eyed Molly" has been recorded by Fairport Convention (who also recorded "The Wounded Whale"), Eva Cassidy, Stan Rogers and Sheena Wellington. "Lindsay" has been recorded by John Renbourn and has been a highlight at his live shows for years, while "Mountain Rain" has been recorded by Wizz Jones (along with Renbourn on guitar).

== Personal life and death ==
Fisher lived in the south of Scotland in his final years. He was appointed a Member of the Order of the British Empire (MBE) in the 2007 New Year Honours, for services to Traditional Scottish Music.

Fisher died on 1 November 2025, aged 86.

== Discography ==
=== Fisher Family ===
- The Fisher Family: Traditional and New Songs From Scotland (1966)

In 2009 Come All ye Fisher Lasses from The Fisher family was included in the Topic Records 70-year anniversary boxset Three Score and Ten as track 2 on the fourth CD.

=== Solo recordings ===
- Archie Fisher (1968)
- Orfeo (1970)
- Will Ye Gang, Love? (1976)
- The Man with a Rhyme (1976)
- Sunsets I've Galloped Into (1988)
- Windward Away (2008)
- A Silent Song (2015)

=== With Barbara Dickson ===
- The Fate o' Charlie (1969)
- Thro' The Recent Years (1970)

=== With Garnet Rogers ===
- Off the Map (1986)
- The Best Times After All (2019)

=== With Frightened Rabbit ===
- "The Work", which he co-wrote, on A Frightened Rabbit EP (2011)
