= Scott Hutchison =

Scottish musician (1981–2018)

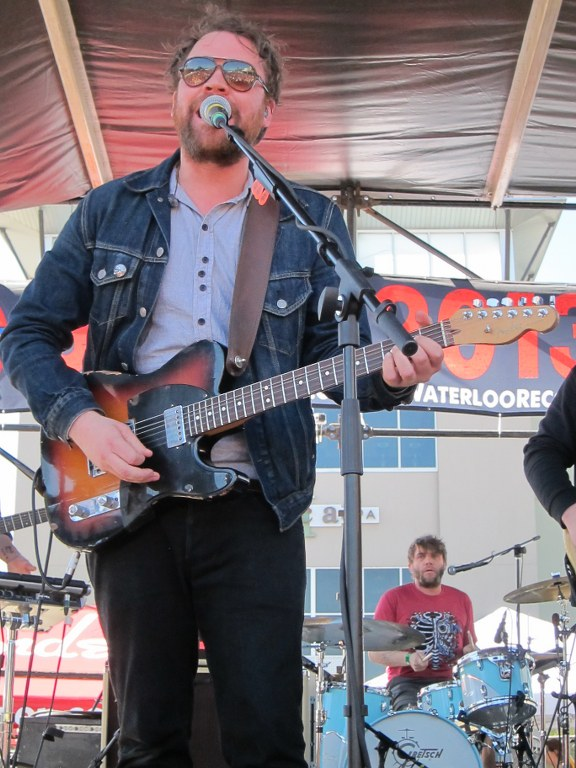
- Hutchison performing with Frightened Rabbit at SXSW in 2013

Background information
- Born: Scott John Hutchison; 20 November 1981; Selkirk, Scottish Borders, Scotland
- Died: 9 May 2018 (aged 36) South Queensferry, Edinburgh, Scotland
- Genres: Indie rock, indie folk
- Instruments: Vocals, guitar
- Years active: 2003–2018
- Labels: Atlantic Records, Fat Cat Records
- Formerly of: Frightened Rabbit, Owl John, The Fruit Tree Foundation, Mastersystem
- Website: frightenedrabbit.com

Scott John Hutchison (20 November 1981 – 9 May 2018) was a Scottish singer, songwriter, guitarist and artist. He was the founding member and primary songwriter of the indie rock band Frightened Rabbit, with whom he recorded five studio albums, and created the artwork for each release.

Hutchison was also a member of the musical collective The Fruit Tree Foundation, and released one solo album under the moniker Owl John. His last musical project was the indie "supergroup" Mastersystem, featuring Frightened Rabbit bandmate and brother Grant alongside members of Editors and Minor Victories.

Hutchison studied illustration at the Glasgow School of Art, before forming Frightened Rabbit in 2003. Initially a solo project, Hutchison collaborated with his brother Grant on the band's debut album, Sing the Greys (2006), and recorded the band's critical breakthrough, The Midnight Organ Fight (2008), as a three-piece, following the collapse of a romantic relationship.

Following the album's release, the band's fanbase expanded significantly and a third studio album, The Winter of Mixed Drinks, was released in 2010. Signing to Atlantic Records, the band released their fourth studio album, Pedestrian Verse, in 2013. The following year, Hutchison recorded a solo album as Owl John. In 2016, the band released their fifth and final studio album, Painting of a Panic Attack.

Hutchison disappeared on 9 May 2018, and his body was found the following day on the banks of the Firth of Forth.

== Early life ==
Hutchison was born on 20 November 1981 in the Scottish Borders town of Selkirk. He was the second of three sons born to Marion and Ron Hutchison, grew up with a close relationship to his brothers Neil and Grant. Hutchison suffered from anxiety and night terrors throughout his childhood, and his mother would often refer to him as her "little frightened rabbit". In particular, Hutchison avoided socialization with other children of his age, and would play by himself in silence.

Moving to the city of Glasgow, he studied illustration at the Glasgow School of Art: "I was there for four years and I didn't particularly want to be an illustrator, so I wanted to apply the rules that I learnt to everything I do, in terms of working in a bank or writing music." While living in Glasgow, he worked in a specialist whisky shop in the residential area of Hyndland, noting: "I began to appreciate and admire the heritage of flavour in a dram of single malt."

Initially considering himself solely a guitarist, Hutchison began singing at the age of nineteen, stating: "Up to that point I was just a guitar player. I didn't know I could sing, I had been told I couldn't." His early songwriting influences included such American artists as Ryan Adams, Wilco and Laura Cantrell, with Hutchison noting, "When I started writing songs, my references were [these] Americana acts. [...] I could associate with those stories. And you can see American folk's deep connections with Scottish folk."

== Music career ==
=== Formation of Frightened Rabbit, Sing the Greys and The Midnight Organ Fight (2003–2009) ===
In 2003, Hutchison began performing under the name Frightened Rabbit, a name given to him by his mother to describe his once shy nature, and began recording and performing with his brother the following year. The duo recorded the band's debut album, Sing the Greys, at The Diving Bell Lounge, with producer Marcus MacKay, and released it independently on local label, Hits the Fan, in 2006; the band signed soon after to Fat Cat Records.

Joined by guitarist Billy Kennedy, the band reissued the album on their new label and began work on its follow-up, The Midnight Organ Fight (2008), with producer Peter Katis, in Bridgeport, Connecticut. Influenced by the collapse of his relationship with his high school and college girlfriend Shell Jubin, the deeply personal album was released to widespread critical acclaim and increased the band's exposure significantly.

=== Owl John ===
Owl John was a solo musical project by Hutchison, formed in 2014. Regarding Owl John and his decision to release a solo record, Hutchison noted, "It was approximately 10 years ago that I started a band called Frightened Rabbit. In that time I've dedicated so much of my life to that good wee band with a stupid name, I felt it was time to indulge Owl John."

Hutchison recorded the project's sole album, Owl John (2014), alongside his Frightened Rabbit bandmate Andy Monaghan and the band's touring guitarist Simon Liddell.

In January 2014, after a long tour in support of Frightened Rabbit's fourth studio album Pedestrian Verse (2013), Hutchison expressed his desire to record solo material without the band, stating: "The process has to be different, otherwise I'm just going to make a Frightened Rabbit-sounding record, which I really don't want to do."

The idea for a solo album stemmed from Frightened Rabbit's label, Atlantic Records: "It was actually the idea of the label to make it rather than me. I thought we were going to get off tour and go straight back into writing another album, and the guy at the label knew things weren't really quite right. He basically was like, 'We'll pay for this record. Go away, make a record and indulge yourself.'" The following month, work began on the album, on the Isle of Mull, with bandmate Andy Monaghan producing, alongside Simon Liddell. Released on 4 August 2014, the self-titled album debuted at number ninety-nine on the UK Albums Chart.

== Collaborations ==
=== Music ===
Hutchison wrote and recorded with The Fruit Tree Foundation, a collaborative charity project featuring Scottish indie rock and folk musicians. The resulting album, First Edition, was released in 2011. Regarding the experience, Hutchison stated: "It was really beautifully done. I thought it was such a great thing, and also personally, for me, that was my first taste of proper collaboration and it really changed my outlook on songwriting. Before, I was kind of like, 'Yeah, I know how to write songs. I don't need anyone's help', and then, of course, you learn so much. So it changed my whole outlook, and I would love to get involved in that kind of thing again."

Hutchison performed a guitar solo on the track "A Bigger World" by indie rock band The Birthday Suit, and is featured in its accompanying music video. The song was the first single released from the band's third studio album, A Hollow Hole of Riches (2014). Hutchison also played guitar and sang backing vocals on the Withered Hand track "Fall Apart" from the 2014 album New Gods. He previously appeared in the video for Withered Hand's 2012 song "Inbetweens". Withered Hand's 2023 album How to Love is dedicated to "precious memories" of Hutchison.

Hutchison is credited, alongside Andy Monaghan, as co-producer of the Florida band Flashlights 2014 album Bummer Summer, released on Hard Rock Records.

==== Mastersystem ====
Hutchison joined the "indie supergroup" in 2017 with his brother Grant and brothers Justin and James Lockey from Editors and Minor Victories respectively. The band released one album, Dance Music, in April 2018.

=== Art ===
Hutchison illustrated much of the album artwork and tour posters for both Frightened Rabbit and his Owl John solo project. The Cross of Lorraine and the Papal cross were reoccurring symbols in his art. Speaking in 2010 Scott explained:

"None of the symbols on the record mean anything. I wanted to create this weird, fake, almost Masonic code that didn't mean anything... It's supposed to be almost religious, but it's not. I'm really interested in documenting visually things that you think you know what they are or what they're for, but maybe you're not so sure. It's supposed to be open-ended enough. I hope no one thinks we're a Christian rock band."

In addition to album and poster art for Frightened Rabbit, Hutchison created artwork for several other artists, including Out Lines' album Conflats (2017) and the Stanley Odd EP Chase Yirsel (2014).

Hutchison illustrated several books. He created all artwork from the 2017 release Oyster, the second book by Edinburgh poet Michael Pedersen. Editions of the book from 2018 onward include a new preface dedicated to Hutchison. Pedersen's 2022 prose book Boy Friends notably discussed his friendship with Hutchison, alongside other friendships Pedersen had experienced.

He also worked on two projects with Philadelphia poet Francis Daulerio. The first of those is If & When We Wake (2015), to which Hutchison contributed twelve drawings. The second collaboration, Please Plant This Book (2018), was first released on bundles of heirloom seed packets, and re-released in a traditional chapbook format. Hutchison contributed nine drawings to it. The book celebrates the 50th anniversary of the original poetry publication by Richard Brautigan and benefits the American Foundation for Suicide Prevention. Daulerio's 2022 release Joy – originally meant to be a further collaboration – is dedicated to Hutchison and includes several poems referencing him.

== Disappearance and death ==
Hutchison was reported missing by Scottish police and the members of Frightened Rabbit on 9 May 2018. He was last seen at 1 a.m. that morning leaving a hotel in South Queensferry. Hutchison had tweeted "Be so good to everyone you love. It's not a given. I'm so annoyed that it's not. I didn't live by that standard and it kills me. Please, hug your loved ones", followed by "I'm away now. Thanks." prior to his disappearance. Grant, Hutchison's brother and bandmate, tweeted to urge anyone with information to contact Police Scotland given his fragile state.

On 10 May, the Chief Inspector of Police Scotland reported that they were searching the area around the Forth Road Bridge for Hutchison, and were looking to contact two individuals who were spotted walking along the bridge the night he disappeared.

Police discovered a body at 8:30 p.m. in the Port Edgar region near South Queensferry, and on 11 May confirmed it was that of Hutchison; no immediate cause of death was disclosed. It was later confirmed by his family via the Tiny Changes mental health charity website that he died by suicide.

Frightened Rabbit issued a statement following Hutchison's death, which read:

There are no words to describe the overwhelming sadness and pain that comes with the death of our beloved Scott but to know he is no longer suffering brings us some comfort. Reading messages of support and hope from those he has helped through his art has helped immensely and we encourage you all to continue doing this. He will be missed by all of us and his absence will always be felt but he leaves a legacy of hope, kindness and colour that will forever be remembered and shared. Rest peacefully Scott.

Much love
Grant, Billy, Andy and Simon x

Celebrities and musicians mourned Hutchison on social media on the day his body was discovered, including Stuart Murdoch, Jo Whiley, Gary Lightbody, Hayley Williams, Sarah Silverman, Jay Baruchel and Wil Wagner. Nicola Sturgeon, the First Minister of Scotland, responded to Hutchison's death on Twitter, writing "Heartbreaking news. My thoughts are with Scott's family, friends and fans. A remarkable and much loved talent." Artists close to Hutchison who performed tributes to him include Frank Turner, The Twilight Sad, Manchester Orchestra, Craig Finn of The Hold Steady, Julien Baker and We Were Promised Jetpacks. Several albums released not long after his death were dedicated to him, including Death Cab for Cutie's Thank You for Today (2018), The Twilight Sad's It Won/t Be Like This All the Time (2019) and Idlewild's Interview Music (2019).

== Legacy ==
In May 2019, the Hutchison family established Tiny Changes, a mental health charity named after a lyric from the band's song "Head Rolls Off", in memory of Scott. In July 2019, Atlantic Records released Tiny Changes: A Celebration of Frightened Rabbit's The Midnight Organ Fight, an album featuring musician friends and colleagues of the band covering their 2008 album in full. It was supposed to be released in summer 2018 to mark the tenth anniversary of The Midnight Organ Fight, and Scott Hutchison was fully involved in the process and had approved the tracks included. In the run-up to the covers album's release, the remaining members of the band gave several interviews, stating that "the band does not exist" without Scott.

Songs dedicated to Hutchison released after his death include Coldplay's "Champion of the World", Dan Mangan's "In Your Corner", Spanish Love Songs' "Routine Pain", Mystery Jets' "Watching Yourself Slowly Disappear", Dave Hause's "Bearing Down", Biffy Clyro's "Unknown Male 01", and The Lone Bellow's "August", co-written with Aaron Dessner, who produced Frightened Rabbit's album Painting of a Panic Attack. Dessner also wrote the song "Hutch" from his band's Big Red Machine second album, 2021's How Long Do You Think It's Gonna Last?. "A Wave Across a Bay", from Frank Turner's 2022 album FTHC, was written after the musician had a dream in which "Scott came into my room with a guitar and showed me a few chords and a few words and some melody". Deacon Blue have dedicated their 2020 track Weight of the World to Hutchison. James Yorkston's 2023 album with Nina Persson and The Second Hand Orchestra, The Great White Sea Eagle, includes a song dedicated to Hutchison titled "A Sweetness in You".

In November 2021, Faber Music published a limited-edition hardcover book titled The Work: The Lyrics of Scott Hutchison, which compiled Hutchison's Frightened Rabbit lyrics alongside some of his original drawings. The book is a collaboration between the band and their longtime art designer DLT (Dave Thomas). A paperback edition was released in April 2022.

== Discography ==
Listed here are Hutchison's work with Frightened Rabbit and other collaborations.

=== Frightened Rabbit ===
- Sing the Greys (2006)
- The Midnight Organ Fight (2008)
- The Winter of Mixed Drinks (2010)
- Pedestrian Verse (2013)
- Painting of a Panic Attack (2016)

=== Mastersystem ===
- Dance Music (2018)

=== Owl John ===
- Owl John (2014)

=== The Fruit Tree Foundation ===
- First Edition (2011)
- New Branch (2011)

=== Select additional appearances ===
- "I Turn Around" – Bad Veins (2012)
- "The Shine" and "Benediction" – Dave Hause (2013)
- "A Bigger World" – The Birthday Suit (2013)
- "Fall Apart" – Withered Hand (2014)
