= Make Model =

Make Model were a Scottish six-piece indie band formed in Glasgow, formerly signed to EMI. They released two singles and garnered much hype, but although their debut album was due in 2008, it was never released and the band split up. Its members were Lewis Gale (vocals, guitar), Gordon Skene (guitar), Aimi Gold (vocals), Ray Black (drums), Mathew Casey (guitar) and James Cameron (bass).

== Career ==
The band formed in October 2006 and played their first show in March 2007 in Inverness. They went on to play a host of festivals including T in the Park and the Reading and Leeds Festivals, as well as touring with the likes of the Fratellis, Malcolm Middleton, British Sea Power and Blood Red Shoes.

Their debut single "The LSB" was released on the band's own label, The Biz Records. Their second single, "The Was", became their EMI debut and was mixed by James Ford of Simian Mobile Disco.

It was announced on the band's website in June 2008 that vocalist/guitarist and founding member Lewis Gale had decided to leave the band, casting doubt over Make Model's future. In February 2009, the band announced on their official website that they had split up.

In October 2009, Frightened Rabbit revealed that Make Model's Gordon Skene was joining them. Skene was a member of the band until mid-2014.

Ray Black went on to become a band manager, working with the likes of Mogwai and The Twilight Sad.

== Discography ==
- "The LSB" - The Biz, 9 July 2007
- "The Was" - EMI, 19 November 2007
- "The LSB" (re-release) - EMI, 21 April 2008
