= The Midnight Organ Fight =

Studio album by Frightened Rabbit
- Released: 14 April 2008
- Recorded: Tarquin Studios, Bridgeport, Connecticut; Diving Bell Lounge; 2 Ruskin Place; 38 White Street, Glasgow, Scotland
- Genres: Indie rock, indie folk
- Length: 48:00
- Language: Scottish English
- Label: Fat Cat
- Producer: Peter Katis

Frightened Rabbit chronology
Sing the Greys (2006)	The Midnight Organ Fight (2008)	The Winter of Mixed Drinks (2010)

Singles from The Midnight Organ Fight
- 1. "Head Rolls Off" Released: 3 March 2008; 2. "Fast Blood" Released: 26 May 2008; 3. "I Feel Better"/"The Twist" Released: 22 September 2008

The Midnight Organ Fight is the second studio album by Scottish indie rock band Frightened Rabbit. Recorded during 2007 between studios at Bridgeport, Connecticut and Glasgow, Scotland, the album was released on 14 April 2008 (15 April in the US) through independent label Fat Cat Records. Hailed by critics as "one of the finest [breakup records] of recent vintage", frontman Scott Hutchison has described the album as being "a lot more intense" than its predecessor Sing the Greys (2006). Following the album's completion, it took around a month for him to be able to listen to it. The album's title comes from a line in the song "Fast Blood", and is said to be a euphemism for sex.

Upon its release, the album was greeted with widespread critical acclaim. Praise often centered on the writing, honest lyricism, and passionate delivery of the band. Viewed as a showpiece for modern Scottish music, the album has continued to receive recognition long after its release and has been featured on various year- and decade-end critic lists.

== Background and recording ==
Having originally started as a solo project of singer-guitarist-lyricist Scott Hutchison in 2003, the band went on to release Sing the Greys - effectively an album of demos - in 2006 with a run of 1,000 copies. After signing to independent label Fat Cat Records in 2007 after gradually building their reputation from word of mouth, the band re-recorded several parts of the album and subsequently re-released it to serve as a "taster" for new material. To record The Midnight Organ Fight, the band stayed with producer Peter Katis (The National, Interpol) for a month at his home studio in Connecticut. Hutchison described the sessions as "hard work", having "spent really long days recording it". Despite this, he praised the work of Katis for being able to "bring a sonic muscle to the songs, and a trademark atmosphere that is entirely his own. He kind of pulled us out of the indie rock basement into a more luscious soundscape. He has a great pop sensibility".

Speaking of his writing for the album, Hutchison explained that, "it’s usually the music first, and I hum and sing syllables to feel out the rhythm and melody, then I finally write the words. Most songs just arrive the way they do by accident, and its certainly not particularly contrived. It’s very important to move the listener and I feel that is music's main goal: to make another human feel something." When asked about his guitar work on the record, the frontman said that, "I really love the challenge of 22 frets, 6 strings and seeing what I could do with that. As opposed to stepping on a pedal to change the music, you know, there's such a wide range of sounds that you can get from a guitar and it's fun to get different ones every time you pick it up". Lyrically, Hutchison stated that "most of the lyrics are pretty direct" and that the album "almost spells out what’s happened". Regarding the personal nature of the lyrics, Scott states that he couldn't "really write about anything else, and I can still visualise the events in each song, which perhaps makes the delivery more genuine". The artwork for the album was also done solely by Hutchison, having spent four years at Art School; "I didn't particularly want to be an illustrator so I wanted to apply the rules that I learnt to everything I do, in terms of working in a bank or writing music".

== Reception ==
Professional ratings
Aggregate scores
Source	Rating
Metacritic	80/100
Review scores
Source	Rating
AllMusic	4.5/5 stars
The A.V. Club	A−
Drowned in Sound	9/10
The Fly	4.5/5 stars
The Irish Times	4/5 stars
Mojo	4/5 stars
Pitchfork	8.1/10
Q	4/5 stars
Spin	3.5/5 stars
Uncut	3/5 stars

=== Critical response ===
The Midnight Organ Fight was met with widespread critical acclaim upon its release. Sampling sixteen reviews, the review aggregator website Metacritic awarded the album a weighted average of 80%.

Josh Model of The A.V. Club awarded the album an "A−" grade and particularly praised the honesty throughout the record; "it's Hutchison's utterly believable desperation and frank lyrics that push the whole thing from good to great. It doesn't make for easy listening, but nothing this flatly honest and powerful ever is". Travis Parno of AbsolutePunk, scored the album at 86% and summarised the sound on the album as "bleak, wandering, and wanton. Somehow, though, the music remains strangely approachable, and damn near uplifting". Drowned in Sound writer Jordan Dowling, rated the album at nine out of ten and praised the simplicity found in the song structures, while stating the band had "shaven off the instrumental passages that snaked through their first release and created 14 blissfully simple pop songs". Mischa Pearlman, writing for The Fly awarded a near-perfect score of 4.5/5. He opined that, "it's a tremulous, trembling effort of stripped down guitars, shot nerves, existential crisis and a sad, twisted heart. Terrific". Review website IGN awarded the album 9.8/10 and lauded the effort as a "modern classic". Writer Chad Grischow comments that The Midnight Organ Fight "triumphantly feeds your heart, soul, feet, and mind all at once, and will become an instant favorite with just one listen. Frightened Rabbit is one of those rare bands that may have perfected their sound on their sophomore effort". The album also received a special Editors Choice award. Writing for Lost at Sea magazine, Jon Burke awarded a score of 9.5/10 and noted, "there is honesty in these songs that cannot be found on most of the pretentious pap getting heralded as 'the next big thing.' Whether or not you choose to accept it, the FACT is that Scotland's own Hutchinson brothers have created a sweet and powerful collection of tunes with The Midnight Organ Fight".

Mojo magazine gave the album four stars out of five and opined, "What might sound like a depressing work of angsty indulgence is in fact an uplifting record of angular alt-folk", while sister-publication, Q magazine, who similarly awarded four stars, noted "Midnight Organ Fight more than delivers on its promise: tons of spiky energy, proper tunes and a real lyrical bite to the likes of The Modern Leper". Rebecca Raber of Pitchfork Media scored the album at 8.1 and remarked, "despite the fact that their methods are well-worn, their product is one-of-a-kind, as their consistently great second album attests. Midnight Organ Flight [sic] is full of rousing barnburners that flicker with soul, ballads that ache with masculine vulnerability, and Frightened Rabbit's best song yet, opener "The Modern Leper"". NME echoed this sentiment by stating that the album is "bleak...also utterly beautiful, scathingly honest, darkly hilarious and impossibly grandiose". Scottish magazine, The Skinny described the album as one "that invokes a range of emotions but generally leaves you exhilarated; enough, in Frightened Rabbit's unique idiom, to make the fast blood hurricane through you". Adam Knott of Sputnikmusic scored the album at 4.5/5 and summarised that the band, "succeed in mixing indie rock and traces of folk into 48 minutes of driven and emotional melodies that lift you up, beat you down and eventually bring closure. It's thoughtful but not self-involved, accessible but by no means generic, and brilliantly energetic but not without its more tender moments".

=== Musicians ===
As well as widespread praise from the press, several fellow musicians also held the album in high regard. Death Cab for Cutie bassist Nick Harmer cites that the album is his favourite 2008 release, stating: "It's lyrically perfect with words that hit you right in the heart. And coupled with Scott Hutchison's vocals, the whole thing just kills me". The band would later go on to support Death Cab for Cutie on their November UK tour. Biffy Clyro frontman Simon Neil stated in an October 2008 interview that "The Modern Leper" was his favourite song of the year, and Frightened Rabbit were soon announced as the main support during their December tour: "We're incredibly excited to tell you that we'll be joined in London, Birmingham, Manchester and Glasgow, by the quite brilliant Frightened Rabbit, whose album The Midnight Organ Fight is one of the best albums of this year. Utterly fantastic. Check it out. Now". Fightstar vocalist and guitarist Charlie Simpson claimed the band "are by far the best thing I have heard for about as long as I can remember" and heaped praise on the album by adding "it's simply crammed to the brim with beautiful melodies and lyrics so poignant, they keep you thinking about what has been said long after the songs have stopped playing. There must be something in the water up in Scotland because this has got to be one of the best records I have heard since Aereogramme's debut release". Jim Adkins of Jimmy Eat World posted a blog on the band's official MySpace citing that: "[The Midnight Organ Fight] was my favorite album of the year. Such a great combination of writing and delivery. One of the best live acts I got to see this year as well. I am really excited to see what 2009 brings for these guys".

== Accolades ==
"On the face of it, their product is hardly revolutionary. Yet, for the past year and a half, The Midnight Organ Fight by Frightened Rabbit has been the album that simply keeps on giving. Potty-mouthed songwriter Scott Hutchison's dog-on-heat tales of drunken love and lust could, in less capable hands, have manifested themselves as self-indulgent lad rock. But the awesome visceral force that ensured these songs came to fruition helps make them some of the best of the decade".

— Finbarr Bermingham of The Skinny in 2009, on the record's replayability.

The Midnight Organ Fight found itself in several "must have" lists that were compiled by various music publications, networks, and other media in the years following its release. Bill Cummings of God Is in the TV opined that the band had managed to, "step up to embrace a more luscious sound showcasing their unique ability (unlike many bands) to make personal experience connect on an almost anthemic, universal level. Scott’s songs convey candid tales of ordinary folk with a wry, acerbic wit via an eloquent, emotive, modern garage-pop aesthetic". Drowned in Sound ranked the album at number two in their "Best Albums of 2008" list with Alexander Tudor writing, "Fact: Casual Listeners will buy what they’re told, if it’s got tunes and a catchphrase, which means the airwaves are always polluted with inanities, and we assume the norm is natural. But Word-of-Mouth means something, it means you're kept listening, maybe it means you loved that album, you felt like it was yours, and the votes you chose to send-in tell us the Not-So-Casual listener does care for the words s/he listens to; in this case, an album about breaking-up and f*cking-up, with the grisliest imagery since Arab Strap, and a moral complexity eclipsing Belle & Sebastian". It ranked at number twenty seven on The Fly's end-of-year album list, with Stephen Brolan stating, "The Midnight Organ Fight may be a bitter, bitter account of relationships ending, but it is also one of the year's most sheerly loveable and entertaining albums. Pop brilliance and emotional turmoil perfectly synthesised." The Midnight Organ Fight also appeared in NMEs end-of year list at number thirty six, as well as being included in their "Greatest Albums of the Decade" article. In the latter, Barry Nicholson opined, "It’s a dark tunnel, but this record is worth it". Finbarr Bermingham of The Skinny named the album as the fourth best in Scotland between 2000-2009. He noted, "Trying to pick an album highlight has been an exercise in futility. Over the course of 18 months, any one of ten tracks has suggested itself as a contender. The song-writing here is accumulative: borrowing from a range of styles to create a near perfect whole; a flawless indie-pop record". American magazine Treble, while including the album in their "Best Albums of the 00s" list, said that the band, "blew the doors wide open with the epic, emotionally charged, The Midnight Organ Fight. If there's an album from 2008 with more fantastic melodies, I certainly haven't heard it. To paraphrase their own lyrics, they're much better than ever." The album also received end-of-year inclusions from various other media including Alternative Ulster, The A.V. Club, Magnet, Lost at Sea, Pitchfork Media, and The Village Voice.

Publication	Country	Nominated work	Accolade	Year	Rank
Alternative Ulster	United Kingdom	The Midnight Organ Fight	Top Albums of the Year	2008	3
Drowned in Sound	United Kingdom	The Midnight Organ Fight	Top Fifty Albums of the Year	2008	2
The Fly	United Kingdom	The Midnight Organ Fight	Albums of '08	2008	27
NME	United Kingdom	The Midnight Organ Fight	Top Fifty Albums of the Year	2008	36
NME	United Kingdom	The Midnight Organ Fight	Top 100 Greatest Albums of the Decade	2009	89
The Skinny	United Kingdom	The Midnight Organ Fight	Top Ten Albums of the Year	2008	1
The Skinny	United Kingdom	The Midnight Organ Fight	Scottish Albums of the Decade	2009	4
The A.V. Club	United States	The Midnight Organ Fight	Best Music of the Year	2008	20
Lost at Sea	United States	The Midnight Organ Fight	Year End Report: Staff Composite Top 20	2008	20
Magnet	United States	The Midnight Organ Fight	Top Albums of the Year	2008	7
Pitchfork Media	United States	The Midnight Organ Fight	Fifty Best Albums of the Year	2008	33
Pitchfork Media	United States	"The Modern Leper"	The 100 Best Tracks of 2008	2008	78
Treble	United States	The Midnight Organ Fight	The Best Albums of the '00s	2010	147
The Village Voice	United States	The Midnight Organ Fight	Pazz & Jop	2008	34

== Select song appearances ==
- "The Twist", "Keep Yourself Warm" and "My Backwards Walk" were featured in season 2, episodes 1 and 7, and season 3, episode 1, respectively, of the NBC show Chuck.
- "Good Arms Vs Bad Arms" was featured in episode 14 of series 4 of Grey's Anatomy and in episode 6 of season 6 of One Tree Hill.
- "Poke" was featured in episode 1 of Season 6 of One Tree Hill.
- "My Backwards Walk" was featured in episode 13 of Season 6 of One Tree Hill.
- "Old Old Fashioned" was featured in a 2010 UK National Lottery advert.

== Track listing ==
All lyrics written by Scott Hutchison; music composed by Frightened Rabbit, except where noted.

No.	Title	Length
1.	"The Modern Leper"	3:48
2.	"I Feel Better"	2:51
3.	"Good Arms vs. Bad Arms"	5:07
4.	"Fast Blood"	3:47
5.	"Old Old Fashioned"	3:43
6.	"The Twist"	3:31
7.	"Bright Pink Bookmark"	1:13
8.	"Head Rolls Off"	3:44
9.	"My Backwards Walk"	3:30
10.	"Keep Yourself Warm"	5:33
11.	"Extrasupervery"	1:18
12.	"Poke"	4:36
13.	"Floating in the Forth"	4:14
14.	"Who'd You Kill Now?"	1:05
Total length:		48:00

Bonus tracks on Australia & New Zealand CD edition
No.	Title	Writer(s)	Length
15.	"Don't"		3:34
16.	"Set You Free" (N-Trance cover)	Kevin O'Toole, Dale Longworth	3:37
17.	"Soon Go"		4:27
Total length:			11:38

== Personnel ==
The following personnel contributed to The Midnight Organ Fight:

Frightened Rabbit

- Scott Hutchison – lead vocals, rhythm guitar, lyrics, artwork
- Billy Kennedy – lead guitar, bass guitar, keyboards
- Grant Hutchison – drums, percussion, backing vocals

Production

- Peter Katis – producer, engineer, mixing
- Alan Douches – mastering
- Jeremy Backofen – assistant engineer
- Kevin McMahon – assistant engineer
- Greg Giorgio – assistant engineer
- Dave Thomas – layout

== Anniversary covers album ==
To mark the 10th anniversary of The Midnight Organ Fight, the band decided to approach musician friends and touring mates in order to record covers of the entire album. The covers album was planned for release in Summer 2018, but the project was delayed following the death of Scott Hutchison, and came out in July 2019 with the title Tiny Changes: A Celebration of Frightened Rabbit’s ‘The Midnight Organ Fight’. The tracks had all been recorded before Hutchison's passing and were approved by him; he had also worked on the album's cover art. The album features liner notes from the remaining members of Frightened Rabbit as well as the participating artists.

Speaking about the release, Grant Hutchison noted: "That album did a lot for us personally, it did a lot for us as a band, it did a lot for people who heard it 10 years ago and a lot for people since... Everyone on [the compilation] has played a part in our personal life and our careers. We're telling a story of an album, and the best way to do that is to have the people who have shared it with you over the years tell their side almost, you know? Their interpretation of that album, it's as important. When you release an album, it's not yours anymore. Once it's out there, it belongs to everyone else. This was a nice way to hear what the people we toured with, our peers, what it meant to them".

In August 2020, Biffy Clyro released a Record Store Day 7" entitled Moderns, which included their versions of "The Modern Leper" and David Bowie's "Modern Love", with proceeds going to the mental health charity Tiny Changes.

=== Track listing ===
1. Biffy Clyro - "The Modern Leper"
2. Oxford Collapse - "I Feel Better"
3. Fiskur - "Good Arms vs. Bad Arms"
4. Right on Dynamite - "Fast Blood"
5. Josh Ritter with Barnstar - "Old Old Fashioned"
6. Wintersleep - "The Twist"
7. The Philistines Jr. - "Bright Pink Bookmark"
8. Craig Finn - "Head Rolls Off"
9. Harkin and Sarah Silverman - "My Backwards Walk"
10. Benjamin Gibbard - "Keep Yourself Warm"
11. Inletts (Jeff Zeigler and Sarah Schimeneck) - "Extrasupervery"
12. Daughter - "Poke"
13. The Twilight Sad - "Floating in the Forth"
14. Aaron Dessner and Lauren Mayberry - "Who'd You Kill Now?"
15. Julien Baker - "The Modern Leper"
16. Piano Bar Fight - "The Twist"
17. Manchester Orchestra - "My Backwards Walk"
