= The Winter of Mixed Drinks =

Studio album by Frightened Rabbit
- Released: 1 March 2010
- Recorded: 2009 at Castle Sound Studios, Pencaitland, Scotland; Tarquin Studios, Bridgeport, Connecticut
- Genre: Indie rock, indie folk
- Length: 45:29
- Label: FatCat
- Producer: Peter Katis

Frightened Rabbit chronology
The Midnight Organ Fight (2008)	The Winter of Mixed Drinks (2010)	A Frightened Rabbit EP (2011)

Singles from The Winter of Mixed Drinks
- 1. "Swim Until You Can't See Land" Released: November 2009; 2. "Nothing Like You" Released: February 2010; 3. "Living in Colour" Released: June 2010; 4. "The Loneliness and the Scream" Released: November 2010

The Winter of Mixed Drinks is the third studio album by Scottish indie rock band Frightened Rabbit, released on 1 March 2010 through independent label FatCat Records. As with its predecessor, the critically acclaimed The Midnight Organ Fight (2008), the album was recorded and produced by Peter Katis. Vocalist, guitarist and songwriter Scott Hutchison states that The Winter of Mixed Drinks is "more of a storytelling record" than the band's previous two albums, and notes that the album is "about an escape and maybe even a slight breakdown. I have to say, it's semi-fictional. There's a protagonist who is possibly male but it doesn't really describe my life because if I did that it wouldn't make for an interesting album this time around as I’ve been quite solid and content, thankfully."

The album was preceded by the singles "Swim Until You Can't See Land" and "Nothing Like You", released during November 2009 and February 2010, respectively. The album's third single "Living in Colour" was released on 14 June. The album's title comes from a line in the song "Living in Colour", with Hutchison stating, "I think we've all had odd, lonely, fallow periods in life, where you find yourself detached from everything, drifting and lost. That's what [the title] means to me, but most importantly, it's the moments of joy afterwards, during recovery, that defines the dark period." The album's fourth and final single "The Loneliness and the Scream" was released in November 2010.

== Background and recording ==
The Winter of Mixed Drinks was written over seven weeks, in the coastal town of Crail, Fife, following heavy touring in support of the band's second album, The Midnight Organ Fight. Drummer Grant Hutchison states that "the location had a big impact on the songs. There's definitely a nautical theme to a lot of the tracks and a feeling of testing yourself to the limit which the sea plays a big part in. Scott [Hutchison] had a daily routine of walking along the beach until an idea came into his head and he would then turn round and develop it on the way home." Demo versions of the songs were subsequently recorded by Scott during his stay in Crail.

The album was primarily recorded at Castle Sound Studios, in Pencaitland, Scotland, with additional recording taking place at Tarquin Studios, in Connecticut, with producer Peter Katis. Recording was complete by mid-2009, with Hutchison stating that he does not want "huge [gaps] in between records." The album also marks guitarist and keyboard player Andy Monaghan's recording debut with the band.

Hutchison has stated that the album is "a lot more detailed and complete" than The Midnight Organ Fight, and that the band recorded their parts separately:

it's not a "live" album at all, it's a real studio effort. Everything has been separately recorded and that's the way I like to make records. There was just something I regretted about the way the last one was recorded, sonically, that I didn't want to happen again. I didn't make the album I wanted to last time - I had to exorcise that feeling.

The seventh track "Man/Bag of Sand" features a sample of dialogue from the 1960s film Inn for Trouble.

Hutchison cites closing track "Yes, I Would" as indicative of the album's overall tone, stating that "there was a conscious effort to eschew the song structure we have employed so often on the last two records – the build and build and build – and that method extends to the album as a whole."

== Release and promotion ==
In October 2009, "Swim Until You Can't See Land" and its b-side "Fun Stuff" were made available for streaming on the FactCat website. A video for "Swim Until You Can't See Land", which featured flickering flashlights, was made available on 16 October, and the single was made available for digital download on 16 November and on seven-inch vinyl on 7 December. Alongside the announcement of the album's title on Scottish music blog, The Pop Cop, the band unveiled a fifth member, Gordon Skene, formerly of Make Model. Later, NME confirmed the band would be playing a special intimate show in London to celebrate Skene's arrival. Similar to Andy Monaghan's entry into the band in early 2008, Skene was not involved in recording the album. Upon his arrival, Hutchison noted that "it must be difficult for him coming into something that four other people were involved in studio-wise. He's not seen any of that process yet. He's coming in playing these songs that perhaps he likes, but doesn't have that same level of connection with, so I think one of the aims [...] is to try and help build that for him."

Frightened Rabbit unveiled the track listing and artwork for The Winter of Mixed Drinks in December 2009, with a UK release date of 1 March 2010. It was preceded by a second single, "Nothing Like You", which was released on 22 February 2010. The band embarked upon a UK tour in support of the album, beginning at The Duchess in York on 4 March 2010 and ending at Norwich Arts Centre ten days later. The album's third single "Living in Colour" was released on 14 June. Summer festival appearances included Glastonbury, Oxegen, T in the Park, Latitude, Lollapalooza and V Festival before the band undertook a 20 date North American tour beginning in Seattle on 7 October and concluding on 3 November in Detroit. A 14 date tour of the UK and Ireland followed, beginning in Bristol on 20 November and ending at Dublin Academy on 9 December.

The album's fourth and final single "The Loneliness and the Scream" was released on 22 November 2010 in the UK and 8 December 2010 in North America. The b-side of "The Loneliness and the Scream" featured Scott Hutchinson duetting with The Hold Steady's Craig Finn on a cover version of Elton John and Kiki Dee's 1976 hit "Don't Go Breaking My Heart". All four singles from the album were collected as a seven-inch vinyl box set, limited to 500 copies, that was released in November 2010 to coincide with the band's UK winter tour.

== Critical reception ==
Professional ratings
Aggregate scores
Source	Rating
Metacritic	(78/100)
Review scores
Source	Rating
AllMusic	4/5 stars
The A.V. Club	A
BBC Music	(favorable)
Drowned in Sound	8/10
The Fly	4.5/5 stars
The Guardian	4/5 stars
NME	8/10
Rock Sound	8/10
This Is Fake DIY	9/10
ShockHound	5/5 stars
The Skinny	4/5 stars
Pitchfork Media	6.6/10

As with predecessor, The Midnight Organ Fight (2008), the album was greeted with widespread praise from critics. Allmusic awarded the album four stars out of five. Heather Phares wrote, "On Winter of Mixed Drinks, they focus and polish Organ Fight’s epics — and add a healthy dose of optimism. Though they’ve always been concerned with heavy issues like life, death, freedom, devotion, and spirituality, this time the bandmembers don’t seem beaten down by their struggles with them. Even when Scott Hutchison sings “Find God just to lose it again” on “The Loneliness and the Scream,” there's a warmth in the music that makes him sound liberated instead of isolated." Josh Modell of The A.V. Club awarded an "A" rating in his review and stated that the album is an "early contender for 2010 best-of lists," and described the album as The Midnight Organ Fight's "slightly more subdued older brother." Laura Barton, writing for the BBC, was also favourable in her review and described the album as, "more polished, more polite than the band’s earlier offerings, but it’s reassuring to note that the band’s scruffy-hearted charm still lies just below the surface."

Robert Cooke of Drowned in Sound was also impressed and awarded a score of eight out of ten, despite stating it "falls short of the dizzying intensity of its masterpiece of a predecessor." He praised frontman Scott Hutchison in particular, describing his performance as still having the "same tremble in the voice, the same elegance in the guitar tone, the same march of the Military Tattoo in the rhythm – but a renewed purpose". Free music magazine, The Fly, awarded the album four ½ out of five stars. Iain Moffat claimed that Scott Hutchison has one of the "most underrated voices in rock" as well as praising the "lyrical sharpness" of the album. He summarised his review by adding, "what more could you possibly want from Frightened Rabbit’s third album? They’re hurling themselves fearlessly at the bright lights, and coming back all the stronger for it." Dave Simpson of The Guardian praised the album's "sharp" songwriting, stating, "most of their songs – with themes of escape, freedom and reinvention – have huge impassioned choruses that are made to be shouted from the nearest available mountain". Awarding four stars, he also added, "The Rabbit are a band overdue a breakthrough, and fans of everyone from Arcade Fire to the similarly revamped Maccabees will find much to love here."

NME magazine called the album "stunning". Praising the band's progression from previous releases, they wrote; "For every song of heartache (‘Yes, I Would’) and self-loathing (‘The Loneliness & The Scream’), there's one of redemption (‘Foot Shooter’) or hope ('Swim Until You Can't See Land’). The album deviates from their previous alt-folkish sensibilities: the fuzzed-up shoegazing of ‘Things’ and the anthemic chorus of ‘Living In Colour’ herald an exciting new bullshit-free dawn." Rock Sound awarded the album eight out of ten. Ben Patashnik said, "Hopefully by now people will have stopped writing FR off as twee indie miserablists; their name gives no indication of the heart-swelling delights contained within". He also added, "rather than wallowing in self-indulgent sorrow, FR are now masters of the intimate emotional portrait writ large." Gareth O’Malley of This Is Fake DIY opined the album was a "step up" from The Midnight Organ Fight. Awarding a score of nine out of ten, he wrote, "As its predecessor was a unified whole (an unflinchingly honest breakup record), so too is Mixed Drinks, though this time around its themes are regret, rebirth, and change." Scottish publication, The Skinny awarded the album four stars out of five. Darren Carle stated, "For those who have journeyed with Frightened Rabbit to this point The Winter of Mixed Drinks is as good an album as could be hoped, as the newly-expanded quintet teeter on the edge of mainstream success. It’s no sell-out and no ‘just add strings’ indie crossover either. They are simply too self-aware for that to be an issue."

=== Accolades ===
Publication	Country	Accolade	Year	Rank
NME	UK	Top 75 Albums of 2010	2010	50
Drowned in Sound	UK	Albums of the Year	2010	64

== Track listing ==
All lyrics written by Scott Hutchison; music by Frightened Rabbit.

No.	Title	Length
1.	"Things"	4:26
2.	"Swim Until You Can't See Land"	4:19
3.	"The Loneliness and the Scream"	4:09
4.	"The Wrestle"	4:00
5.	"Skip the Youth"	6:18
6.	"Nothing Like You"	3:03
7.	"Man/Bag of Sand"	2:26
8.	"Foot Shooter"	4:13
9.	"Not Miserable"	4:12
10.	"Living In Colour"	3:46
11.	"Yes, I Would"	4:37
Total length:		45:29

=== Bonus tracks ===
Australia & New Zealand Release
No.	Title	Length
12.	"Fun Stuff"	3:30
13.	"Learned Your Name"	2:40

Japanese Release
No.	Title	Length
12.	"Fun Stuff"	3:27
13.	"Learned Your Name"	2:41
14.	"Swim (Alternate Version)"	3:44

10th Anniversary Edition (2020)
No.	Title	Length
12.	"Things (Live at the Roundhouse, London, UK, Dec. 7, 2016)"	4:33
13.	"The Wrestle (Live at The Grog Shop, Cleveland, OH, USA, May 5, 2010)"	3:42

== Personnel ==
The following personnel contributed to The Winter of Mixed Drinks:

=== Frightened Rabbit ===
- Scott Hutchison — lead vocals, rhythm guitar, lyrics, artwork
- Billy Kennedy — lead guitar, bass guitar, keyboards, backing vocals
- Grant Hutchison — drums, percussion, backing vocals
- Andy Monaghan — additional guitar, keyboards, backing vocals

=== Additional musicians ===
- Volker Bertelmann - string arrangement
- Insa Schirmer - cello
- Sabine Baron - violin
- Robert McCrorie - saxophone
- Ben Hillman - trumpet
- Suzie Bowman - trombone

=== Production ===
- Peter Katis — producer, mixing
- Stuart Hamilton - recording, engineer
- Greg Giorgio — additional recording
- Alan Douches — mastering
- Ben Feggans - mastering
- DLT — layout

== Release history ==
Region	Date	Label	Format	Catalogue #	Ref.
United Kingdom	1 March 2010	FatCat Records	CD, LP, Digital	FATCD84	
United States	9 March 2010	FatCat Records	CD, LP, Digital	FATCD84	
Japan	21 April 2010	Imperial Records	CD		

== Chart performance ==
Chart	Peak position
US Billboard 200	84
US Independent Albums	7
UK Albums Chart	61
UK Independent Albums	5
