= FatCat Records discography =

A discography of FatCat Records (divided by series) and sublabel 130701.

== Series ==
=== 7" Series ===
- 7FAT01: Immense, Death To The Gremlins, 7" 1999
- 7FAT02: Xinlisupreme, All You Need Is Love Was Not True, 7" 2001
- 7FAT03: Drowsy, Careless Me, 7" 2001
- 7FAT04: Giddy Motors, Whirled By Curses, 7" 2002
- 7FAT05: Charlottefield, Picture Diary, 7" 2002
- 7FAT06: múm, Green Grass Of Tunnel, 7" 2002
- CD7FAT06: múm, Green Grass Of Tunnel, 3" CDS 2002
- 7FAT07: Programme, Une Vie, 7" 2002
- FAT-LTD01: 7" Series sampler, limited edition of 50, Official hand labelled CDr 2002
- 7FAT08: Giddy Motors, Magmanic, 7" 2003
- CD7FAT08: Giddy Motors, Magmanic, CDS 2003
- 7FAT09: Party of One, Shotgun Funera, 7" 2003
- 7FAT10: Mice Parade, Focus On The Rollercoaster, 7" 2003
- CD7FAT10: Mice Parade, Focus On The Rollercoaster, CD 2003
- 7FAT11: The Mutts, Missing My Devil, 7" 2004
- CD7FAT11: The Mutts, Missing My Devil, CD 2004
- 7FAT11LP: The Mutts, Live at the Concorde 2, CD 2004
- 7FAT12: Party of One, Snap You Like A Twig, 7" 2004
- 7FAT14: múm, Nightly Cares, 7" 2004
- CD7FAT14: múm, Nightly Cares, 3" CDS 2004
- 7FAT15: Animal Collective, Who Could Win A Rabbit, 7" 2004
- 7FAT16: The Mutts, Blood From A Stone, 7" 2005
- 7FAT17: Amandine, Halo, 7" 2005
- 7FAT18: The Mutts, C'mon, Come Up, Come In, 7" 2006
- 7FAT19: Animal Collective, Grass, 7" 2005
- CD7FAT19: Animal Collective, Grass, CDS 2005
- DVD7FAT19: Animal Collective, Grass, DVD/CDS 2006
- 7FAT20: Charlottefield, Stand Up, 2006
- 7FAT21: The Rank Deluxe, Doll Queue, 2006
- 7FAT22: The Rank Deluxe, Style, 2006
- 7FAT23: Blood on the Wall, Mary Susan, 2006
- 7FAT24: Ensemble, Disown, Delete, 2006
- 7FAT25; Blood on the Wall, Reunite On Ice, 2006
- 7FAT26: The Rank Deluxe, Poorman's Cab, 2006

=== 10" Series ===
- 10FAT02: Sigur Rós, () Single, 10" 2003
- CD10FAT02: Sigur Rós, () Single, CDS 2003
- DVD10FAT02: Sigur Rós, () Single, DVD/CDS 2003
- 10FAT03: múm, Dusk Log, 10", 2004
- CD10FAT03: múm, Dusk Log, CDS, 2004

=== 12" Series ===
- 12FAT001: Web, Eva 12", 1996
- 12FAT002: Grain, Untitled (G1) 12", 1997
- 10FAT002: Grain, Untitled (G1) 10", 1997
- 12FAT003: Various Artists, 8,8.5,9, 12" 1997
- 12FAT004: Insync v Mysteron, Tales From The Crypt 12" 1997
- 12FAT005: Live Human, Improvisessions, 12" 1998
- 12FAT006: Third Eye Foundation / V/Vm, Split #1, 12" 1998
- 12FAT007: To Rococo Rot, She Understands The Dynamics, 12" 1998
- 12FAT008: Various Artists, Remixes, 12" 1998
- 12FAT009: Ad Vanz v Gescom / Foehn, Split #2, 12" 1998
- 12FAT010: Transient Waves, Born With A Body And Fucked In The Head, 12" 1998
- 12FAT011: The Dylan Group, If I Had Been Able, 12" 1998
- 12FAT012: Grindverk, Gesundheit Von K, 12" 1999
- 12FAT014: Mice Parade, My Funny Friend Scott, 12" 1998
- 12FAT015: Sons Of The Sun, Heaven Lamp, 12" 1999
- 12FAT016: Grain, Untitled (G2), 12" 1999
- 12FAT017: Grain, Untitled (G3), 12" 1999
- 12FAT018: Fonn, 2x12, 2x12" 1999
- 12FAT019: Live Human, Orange Flower Bush Monkey, 12" 1999
- 12FAT020: Christoph De Babalon / Kid 606, Split #10, 12" 2000
- 12FAT021: Process, Untitled, 12" 1998
- 12FAT022: Björk mit Funkstörung, All Is Full Of Love, 12" 1998
- CDFAT022: Björk mit Funkstörung, All Is Full Of Love, CDS 1998
- 12FAT023: Janek Schaefer / Pan American, Split #3, 12" 1998
- 12FAT024X: James Plotkin / Pimmon, Split #8, 12" 2000
- 12FAT025: The Realistics, Where's The Monkey, 12" 1998
- 12FAT026: Chasm / Bannlust, Splt #5, 12" 1999
- 12FAT027: Matmos / Motion, Split #11, 12" 1999
- 12FAT028: Immense, Spontaneous Combustion, 12" 1999
- 12FAT029: Dr. Smith & Professor Ludlow, Professors Saying Raas, 12" 1999
- 12FAT030: AMM / Merzbow, Splt #4, 12" 1999
- 12FAT031: Speedranch^Jansky Noise / Child & Read, Split #6, 12" 1999
- 12FAT032: The Bug, Low Rider, 12" 1999
- 12FAT033: Req / Team Doyobi, Splt #7, 12" 1999
- 12FAT034: Process / DAT politics, Splt #9, 12" 1999
- 12FAT035: Dr. Smith & Professor Ludlow, Rinsin' With The Doctor, 12" 1999
- 12FAT036: Sigur Rós, Svefn-G-Englar, 12" 1999
- CDFAT036: Sigur Rós, Svefn-G-Englar, CDS" 1999
- 12FAT037: Stromba, The Pinch, 12" 1999
- 12FAT038: Di Lacuna, Teetering On The Edge Of Quiet, 12" 1999
- 12FAT039: Sigur Rós, Ny Batteri, 12" 2000
- CDFAT039: Sigur Rós, Ny Batteri, CD" 2000
- 12FAT040: Duplo Remote / Com.A, Split #12, 12" 2000
- 12FAT041: Grain, Untitled (G4), 12" 2002
- 12FAT042: Alejandra & Aeron / QT?, Split #13, 12" 2001
- 12FAT043: Ultra-red / Anna Planeta, Split #14, 12" 2002
- 12FAT044: Black Dice, Miles Of Smiles, 12" 2005
- CDFAT044: Black Dice, Miles Of Smiles, CD 2005
- 12FAT045: Fennesz / Main, Split #15, 12" 2002
- 12FAT046: David Grubbs / Avey Tare, Split #16, 12" 2003
- 12FAT047: Stromba, Giddy Up, 12" s004
- 12FAT048: The Ivytree / Chris Smith, Split #17, 12" 2004
- 12FAT049: The Mutts, The Mutts, 12" 2004
- CDFAT049: The Mutts, The Mutts, CD 2004
- 12FAT050: Konono Nº1 / The Dead C, Split #18, 12" 2005
- CDFAT052: Amandine, Leave Out The Sad Parts, CD 2006
- CDFAT053: Amandine, Waiting For The Light To Find Us, 2006
- 12FAT054: The Mutts, I You We Us, 12" 2006
- CDFAT054: The Mutts, I You We Us, CD 2006
- CDFAT055: The Rank Deluxe, The Rank Deluxe, CD 2006
- CDFAT058: Songs Of Green Pheasant, Aerial Days, CD 2006
- 12FAT056: Panda Bear, Bros, 12" 2007
- 12FAT057: Múm, The Peel Session, 12" 2006
- CDFAT057: Múm, The Peel Session, CD 2006
- 12FAT059: Panda Bear, Bros, 12" 2006

=== Albums ===
- FATCD001: Various Artists, Across Uneven Terrain, CD 1998
- FATCD002: Transient Waves, Sonic Narcotic, CD 1999
- FATLP002: Transient Waves, Sonic Narcotic, 12" 1999
- FATCD003: Live Human, Monostereosis, CD 1999
- FATLP003: Live Human, Monostereosis, 2x12" 1999
- FATCD004: Mice Parade, Ramda, CD 1999
- FATLP004: Mice Parade, Ramda, 12" 1999
- FATCD005: Fonn, Field 831, CD 1999
- FATLP005: Fonn, Field 831, 12" 1999
- FATCD006: Immense, Evil Ones And Zeros, CD 1999
- FATLP006: Immense, Evil Ones And Zeros, 12" 1999
- FATCD007: Various Artists, 8,8.5,9, Remixes CD 1999
- FATCD008: Various Artists, Split Series 1-8 Compilation, CD 2000
- FATCD009: Process, Shape-Space, CD 2000
- FATLP009: Process, Shape-Space, 12" 2000
- FATLP10: The Dylan Group, The Ur-Klang Search, 2x12" 2000
- FATCD11: Sigur Rós, Agaetis Byrjun, CD 2000
- FATLP11: Sigur Rós, Agaetis Byrjun, 2x12" 2000
- FATCD12: Him (band), Our Point Of Departure, CD 2000
- FATLP12: Him (band), Our Point Of Departure, 2x12" 2000
- FATCD14: Various Artists, No Watches No Maps, CD 2001
- FATCD15: Him (band), New Features, CD 2001
- FATLP15: Him (band), New Features, 2x12" 2001
- FATCD16: Mice Parade, Mookoondi, CD 2001
- FATLP16: Mice Parade, Mookoondi, 2x12" 2001
- FATCD16: múm, Finally We Are No One, CD 2002
- FATLP16: múm, Finally We Are No One, 2x10" 2002
- FATCD19: Stromba, Tales From The Sitting Room, CD 2005
- FATLP19: Stromba, Tales From The Sitting Room, 2x12" 2005
- FATCD20: Giddy Motors, Make It Pop, CD 2002
- FATLP20: Giddy Motors, Make It Pop, 12" 2002
- FATCD21: David Grubbs, Rickets And Scurvy, CD 2002
- FATLP21: David Grubbs, Rickets And Scurvy, 12" 2002
- FATCD22: Sigur Rós, (), CD 2002
- FATLP22: Sigur Rós, (), 2x12" 2002
- FATCD23: Various Artists, Branches And Routes, CD 2003
- FATCD24: Black Dice, Beaches & Canyons, CD 2003
- FATLP24: Black Dice, Beaches & Canyons, 12" 2003
- FATCD25: Crescent, By The Roads And The Fields, CD 2003
- FATLP25: Crescent, By The Roads And The Fields, 12" 2003
- FATCD26: múm, Summer Make Good, CD 2004
- FATCD26B: múm, Summer Make Good, Ltd Edition CD 2004
- FATLP26: múm, Summer Make Good, 2x12" 2004
- FATCD27: Party of One, Caught The Blast, CD 2003
- FATLP27: Party of One, Caught The Blast, 12" 2003
- FATCD28: Him (band), Many In High Places Are Not Well, CD 2003
- FATLP28: Him (band), Many In High Places Are Not Well, 12" 2003
- FATCD29: Mice Parade, Obrigado Saudade, CD 2004
- FATLP29: Mice Parade, Obrigado Saudade, 12" 2004
- FATCD30: Chib, Moco, CD 2004
- FATCD31: Various Artists, Split Series 9-16 Compilation, CD 2004
- FATCD32: Black Dice, Creature Comforts, CD 2004
- FATLP32: Black Dice, Creature Comforts, 12" 2004
- FATCD33: David Grubbs, A Guess at the Riddle, CD 2004
- FATLP33: David Grubbs, A Guess at the Riddle, 12" 2004
- FATCD34: Drowsy, Growing Green, CD 2005
- FATCD35: Mouse Parade, Bem-Vinda Vontade, CD 2005
- FATLP35: Mouse Parade, Bem-Vinda Vontade, 2x12" 2005
- FATCD36: The Mutts, Life In Dirt, CD 2005
- FATLP36: The Mutts, Life In Dirt, 12" 2005
- FATCD37: Amandine, This Is Where Our Hearts Collide, CD 2005
- FATCD38: Vashti Bunyan, Lookaftering, CD 2005
- FATCD39: Charlottefield, How Long Are You Staying, CD 2005
- FATCD40: Songs Of Green Pheasant, Songs Of Green Pheasant, CD 2005
- FATCD41: Tom Brosseau, Empty Houses Are Lonely, CD 2006
- FATCD42: Drowsy, Snow On Moss On Stone, CD 2006
- FATCD43: Vetiver, To Find Me Gone, CD 2006
- FATCD43LTD: Vetiver, To Find Me Gone, CD 2006
- FATLP43: Vetiver, To Find Me Gone, 2x12" 2006
- FATCD44: Ensemble, Ensemble, CD 2006
- FATCD45: Giddy Motors, Do Easy, CD 2006
- FATCD47: Nina Nastasia, On Leaving, CD 2006
- FATLP47: Nina Nastasia, On Leaving, 12" 2006
- FATCD48: Blood on the Wall, Awesomer, CD 2006
- FATLP48: Blood on the Wall, Awesomer, 12" 2006
- FATCD51: David Karsten Daniels, Sharp teeth, CD 2007
- FATCD52: Welcome, Sirs CD 2006
- FATCD53: Nina Nastasia and Jim White, You Follow Me CD 2007
- FATCD55: The Twilight Sad, Fourteen Autumns & Fifteen Winters, CD 2007
- FATCD56: The Twilight Sad, The Twilight Sad (EP), CD 2006
- FATCD59: Vashti Bunyan, Some Things Just Stick in Your Mind, 2-CD, Ltd 2-CD, 2-LP 2007
- FATCD67: Frightened Rabbit, Sing the Greys, CD 2007
- FATCD70: Frightened Rabbit, The Midnight Organ Fight, CD 2008
- FATCD72: We Were Promised Jetpacks, These Four Walls, CD 2009
- FATCD77: The Twilight Sad, Forget the Night Ahead, CD 2009
- FATLP80: Stórsveit Nix Noltes, "Royal Family-Divorce", 12" 2009
- FATCD82: Nina Nastasia, Outlaster, CD 2010
- FATLP82: Nina Nastasia, Outlaster, 12" 2010
- FATCD83: Frightened Rabbit, Quietly Now!, CD 2008
- FATCD84: Frightened Rabbit, The Winter of Mixed Drinks, CD 2010
- FATCD92: David Karsten Daniels, Fight The Big Bull, I Mean to Live Here Still, CD 2010
- FATLP94: Gregory and the Hawk Leche, LP 2010
- FATCD94: Gregory and the Hawk Leche, CD 2010
- FATLP96: Les Shelleys Les Shelleys, LP 2010
- FATCD96: Les Shelleys Les Shelleys, CD 2010
- FATLP100: Maps & Atlases, Perch Patchwork, LP 2010
- FATCD100: Maps & Atlases, Perch Patchwork, CD 2010
- FATLP101: Mice Parade, What It Means to Be Left-Handed, LP 2010
- FATCD101: Mice Parade, What It Means to Be Left-Handed, CD 2010
- FATCD95: Ensemble Excerpts, CD 2011
- FATLP103: Mazes A Thousand Heys, LP 2011
- FATCD103: Mazes A Thousand Heys, CD 2011
- FATLP108: Milk Maid Yucca, LP 2011
- FATCD108: Milk Maid Yucca, CD 2011
- FATLP97: We Were Promised Jetpacks, In the Pit of the Stomach LP 2011
- FATCD97: We Were Promised Jetpacks, In the Pit of the Stomach CD 2011
- FATLP110: Forrest Fire Staring At the X, LP 2011
- FATCD110: Forrest Fire Staring At the X, CD 2011
- FATLP105: Odonis Odonis Hollandaze, LP 2011
- FATCD105: Odonis Odonis Hollandaze, CD 2011
- FATLP98: The Twilight Sad No One Can Ever Know, LP 2012
- FATCD98: The Twilight Sad No One Can Ever Know, CD 2012
- FATLP104: Brenton Other People's Problems, LP 2012
- FATCD104: Brenton Other People's Problems, CD 2012
- FATLP115: Maps & Atlases Beware And Be Grateful, LP 2012
- FATCD115: Maps & Atlases Beware And Be Grateful, CD 2012
- FATCD111: Milk Maid Mostly No, CD 2012
- FATLP114: PAWS Cokefloat! LP 2012
- FATCD114: PAWS Cokefloat! CD 2012
- FATLP117: U.S Girls Gem, LP 2012
- FATCD117: U.S Girls Gem, CD 2012
- FATLP99: The Twilight Sad No One Can Ever Know Remixes LP 2012
- FATCD99: The Twilight Sad No One Can Ever Know Remixes, CD 2012
- FATLP116: Mazes Ores & Minerals, LP 2013
- FATCD116: Mazes Ores & Minerals, CD 2013
- FATLP120: Mice Parade Candela, LP 2013
- FATCD120: Mice Parade Candela, CD 2013
- FATLP121: The Growlers Hung At Heart, LP 2013
- FATCD121: The Growlers Hung At Heart, CD 2013
- FATCD123: Forrest Fire Screens, CD 2013
- FATLP126: Tal National Kaani, LP 2013
- FATCD126: Tal National Kaani, CD 2013
- FATCD122: TRAAMS Grin, CD 2013
- FATLP125: His Clancyness Vicious, LP 2013
- FATCD125: His Clancyness Vicious, CD 2013
- FATLP129: PAWS Youth Culture Forever, LP 2014
- FATCD129: PAWS Youth Culture Forever, CD 2014
- FATLP128: Honeyblood Honeyblood, LP 2014
- FATCD128: Honeyblood Honeyblood, CD 2014
- FATLP119: Mazes Wooden Aquarium, LP 2014
- FATCD119: Mazes Wooden Aquarium, CD 2014
- FATLP133: The Growlers Chinese Fountain, LP 2014
- FATCD133: The Growlers Chinese Fountain, CD 2014
- FATLP127: We Were Promised Jetpacks Unravelling, LP 2014
- FATCD127: We Were Promised Jetpacks Unravelling, CD 2014
- FATLP131: Vashti Bunyan Heartleap, LP 2014
- FATCD131: Vashti Bunyan Heartleap, CD 2014
- FATLP132: The Twilight Sad Nobody Wants To Be Here & Nobody Wants To Leave, LP 2014
- FATCD132: The Twilight Sad Nobody Wants To Be Here & Nobody Wants To Leave, CD 2014
- FATLP124: Curtis Harvey The Wheel, LP 2014
- FATCD124: Curtis Harvey The Wheel, CD 2014
- FATLP135: Shopping Consumer Complaints, LP 2014
- FATCD135: Shopping Consumer Complaints, CD 2014
- FATLP137: Tal National Zoy Zoy, LP 2015
- FATCD137: Tal National Zoy Zoy, CD 2015
- FATLP138: Best Friends Hot. Reckless. Totally Insane, LP 2015
- FATCD138: Best Friends Hot. Reckless. Totally Insane, CD 2015
- FATLP130: C Duncan Architect, LP 2015
- FATCD130: C Duncan Architect, CD 2015
- FATLP139: Shopping Why Choose?, LP 2015
- FATCD139: Shopping Why Choose?, CD 2015
- FATLP136: TRAAMS Modern Dancing, LP 2015
- FATCD136: TRAAMS Modern Dancing, CD 2015
- FATLP142: Big Deal Say Yes, LP 2016
- FATLP142: Big Deal Say Yes, LP 2016
- FATLP143: PAWS No Grace, LP 2016
- FATCD143: PAWS No Grace, CD 2016
- FATLP144: C Duncan The Midnight Sun, LP 2016
- FATCD144: C Duncan The Midnight Sun, CD 2016
- FATLP141: Honeyblood Babes Never Die, LP 2016
- FATCD141: Honeyblood Babes Never Die, CD 2016
- FATLP145: Tall Ships Impressions, LP 2017
- FATCD145: Tall Ships Impressions, CD 2017

=== Splinter Series ===
- FATSP01: Foehn, Hidden Cinema Soundtrack, CD 2000
- FATSP02: Janek Schaefer, Above Buildings, CD 2000
- FATSP03: Xinlisupreme, Tomorrow Never Comes, CD 2002
- FATSP04: Ultra-red, La Economia Nueva, CD 2001
- FATSP05: Dorine Muraille, Mani, CD 2003
- FATSP06: Xinlisupreme, Murder Licence, CD 2002
- FATSP07: Animal Collective, Spirit They're Gone, Spirit They've Vanished / Danse Manatee, 2xCD 2003
- FATSP08: Animal Collective, Sung Tongs, CD 2003
- FATSP08LP: Animal Collective, Sung Tongs, 2x12" 2003
- FATSP09: Animal Collective, Prospect Hummer (feat Vashti Bunyan), CD 2005
- FATSP10: Aoki Takamasa + Tujiko Noriko, 28, CD 2005
- FATSP11: Animal Collective, Feels, CD 2005
- FATSP11LP: Animal Collective, Feels, 2x12" 2005
- FATSP11LTD: Animal Collective, Feels, 2xCD 2005
- FATSP12: Our Brother The Native, Tooth And Claw, CD 2006

=== Remix Series ===
- FB-01: HiM, Remix Series #1 Japan, 12" 2003

=== E-RMX Series ===
- 281-1TP: Grain / Process, E-RMX 1, 7" 2000
- 281-2TP: Mice Parade / V/Vm / Múm, E-RMX 2, 7" 2000
- 281-3TP: Dr. Smith & Professor Ludlow / Stromba, E-RMX 3, 7" 2000
- 281-4TP: Motion / Antenna Farm, E-RMX 4, 7" 2000
- 281-5TP: Lucky Kitchen / Team Doyobi, E-RMX 5, 7" 2000
- 281-6TP: Foehn / Chasm, E-RMX 6, 7" 2000
- 281-7TP: Immense / Fonn, E-RMX 7, 7" 2000
- 281-8TP: Di Lacuna / Transient Waves, E-RMX 8, 7" 2000

=== OST ===
- FATOSTCD01: Hilmar Orn Hilmarsson & Sigur Rós, Angels of the Universe, CD 2001

=== Comic Series ===
- CDFATPROG001: Metaphrog / Hey / múm, Dreams Never Die, CD 2004
- 7FATPROG001: Metaphrog / Hey / múm, Dreams Never Die, 7" 2004

=== Promotional Kits ===
- FATIPK01: Sigur Rós, Interactive Press Kit, 2CD 2002

=== Promotional ===
- CD12FAT048/CD12FAT050P: The Ivytree, Chris Smith, Konono No1, The Dead C, Split 12" Series Promo, CD 2004

== Sublabel ==
=== 130701 ===
- CD1301: Set Fire to Flames, Sings Reign Rebuilder, CD 2001
- LP1301: Set Fire to Flames, Sings Reign Rebuilder, 2x12" 2001
- CD1302: Sylvain Chauveau, Un Autre Decembre, CD 2003
- CD1303: Set Fire to Flames, Telegraphs in Negative/Mouths Trapped in Static, 2xCD 2003
- LP1303: Set Fire to Flames, Telegraphs in Negative/Mouths Trapped in Static, 2x12" 2003
- CD1304: Max Richter, The Blue Notebooks, CD 2004
- CD1305: Max Richter, Songs From Before, CD 2006
- CD1306: Hauschka, Room To Expand, CD 2007
- LP1307: Max Richter, 24 Postcards In Full Colour, 2x12" 2008
- LP1308: Hauschka, Ferndorf, LP 2008
- CD1308: Hauschka, Ferndorf, CD 2008
- CD1310: Various Artists Floored Memory....Fading Location, CD 2009
- LP1309: Max Richter Memoryhouse, 2xLP 2009
- CD1309: Max Richter Memoryhouse, CD 2009
- LP1311: Max Richter Infra, LP 2010
- CD1311: Max Richter Infra, CD 2010
- LP1312: Hauschka Foreign Landscapes, LP 2010
- CD1312: Hauschka Foreign Landscapes, LP 2010
- LP1314: Dustin O'Halloran Lumiere, LP 2011
- CD1314: Dustin O'Halloran Lumiere, CD 2011
- LP1316: Hauschka Salon Des Amateurs, LP 2011
- CD1316: Hauschka Salon Des Amateurs, CD 2011
- LP1313: Dustin O'Halloran The Miner's Hyms, LP 2011
- CD1313: Dustin O'Halloran The Miner's Hyms, CD 2011
- LP1315: Dustin O'Halloran Vorleben, LP 2011
- CD1315: Dustin O'Halloran Vorleben, CD 2011
- LP1319: Various Artists Trancendentallism, LP 2012
- CD1318: Sylvain Chauveau Simple, CD 2012
- CD1321: Dmitry Evgrafov Collage, CD 2015
- CD1321B: Dmitry Evgrafov Collage (Pieces) – bonus disc, CD 2015
- CD1320: Emilie Levienaise-Farrouch Like Water Through the Sand, CD 2015
- CD1320B: Emilie Levienaise-Farrouch Like Water Through the Sand (Bonus Disc), CD 2015
- CD1306X: Hauschka, Room To Expand (Expanded), CD 2016
- LP1306X: Hauschka, Room To Expand (Expanded), 2xLP 2016
- LP1322: Ian William Craig Centres, 2xLP 2016
- CD1322: Ian William Craig Centres, CD 2016
- LP1317: Various Artists Eleven Into Fifteen: a 130701 Compilation, 2xLP 2016
- CD1317: Various Artists Eleven Into Fifteen: a 130701 Compilation, CD 2016
- CD1317B: Various Artists 130701 ‘New Blood’ – bonus disc, CD 2016
- LP1323: Resina Resina, LP 2016
- CD1323: Resina Resina, CD 2016
- DA1324: Dmitry Evgrafov The Quiet Observation, Digital 2016
- DS1301: Ian William Craig, Olivier Alary Remixes, Digital 2017
- LP1325: Olivier Alary Fiction/Non Fiction, LP 2017
- CD1325: Olivier Alary Fiction/Non Fiction, CD 2017
- LP1326: Ian William Craig Slow Vessels, LP 2017
- CD1326: Ian William Craig Slow Vessels, CD 2017

== See also ==
- List of record labels
- Fat Cat Records
