= And She Would Darken the Memory =

Single by The Twilight Sad

from the album Fourteen Autumns & Fifteen Winters
- B-side: "That Summer, at Home I Had Become the Invisible Boy" (Ensemble Remix)
- Released: 16 July 2007
- Recorded: Chem19 Studios
- Genre: Indie rock, shoegazing
- Length: 4:41 (radio edit); 5:49 (album version)
- Label: Fat Cat (FAT32)
- Songwriter(s): James Graham, Andy MacFarlane
- Producer(s): The Twilight Sad

The Twilight Sad singles chronology
"That Summer, at Home I Had Become the Invisible Boy" (2007)	"And She Would Darken the Memory" (2007)	"I Became a Prostitute" (2009)

"And She Would Darken the Memory" (sometimes referred to as "And She Would Darken the Memory of Youth") is a song by Scottish indie rock band The Twilight Sad, that appears on the EP The Twilight Sad, and their debut album, Fourteen Autumns & Fifteen Winters. The song was released as the album's second single on 16 July 2007 on Fat Cat Records. A music video was also produced for the song, directed by Mark Charlton. The track would appear in a re-worked version as the opening track to the mini-album Here, It Never Snowed. Afterwards It Did in June 2008.

"And She Would Darken the Memory" was also featured in the 2008 video game Saints Row 2.

== Track listing ==
All tracks are written by Andy MacFarlane (music) and James Graham (lyrics); arranged by The Twilight Sad.

No.	Title	Length
1.	"And She Would Darken the Memory"	5:49
2.	"That Summer, at Home I Had Become the Invisible Boy" (Decomposed by Ensemble)	4:17

== Credits ==
- James Alexander Graham – vocals
- Andy MacFarlane – guitar, accordion
- Craig Orzel – bass
- Mark Devine – drums
- Produced by The Twilight Sad
- Recorded by David Paterson
- Mixed by Peter Katis
- Additional production on "That Summer" remix by Olivier Alary
- Additional piano on "That Summer" remix by Johannes Malfatti
- Additional saxophone on "That Summer" remix by Erik Hove
- Mastered by Mandy Parnell
- dlt – artwork
