= Red Sun Through Smoke =

Studio album by Ian William Craig
- Released: March 27, 2020
- Length: 40:20
- Label: FatCat

Ian William Craig chronology
Thresholder (2018)	Red Sun Through Smoke (2020)

Professional ratings
Aggregate scores
Source	Rating
Metacritic	80/100
Review scores
Source	Rating
AllMusic	4/5 stars
Exclaim!	9/10
Louder Than War	8/10

Red Sun Through Smoke is a studio album by Canadian musician Ian William Craig. It was released on March 27, 2020 under FatCat Records.

== Critical reception ==
Red Sun Through Smoke was met with generally favorable reviews from critics. At Metacritic, which assigns a weighted average rating out of 100 to reviews from mainstream publications, this release received an average score of 80, based on 7 reviews.

== Track listing ==
Red Sun Through Smoke track listing
No.	Title	Length
1.	"Random"	1:30
2.	"The Smokefallen"	3:07
3.	"Weight"	6:37
4.	"Comma"	2:00
5.	"Condx QRN"	3:07
6.	"Mountains Astray"	2:08
7.	"Take"	1:33
8.	"Last of the Lantern Oil"	5:35
9.	"Supper"	1:39
10.	"Far and then Farther"	3:17
11.	"Open Like a Loss"	6:02
12.	"Stories"	3:23
