= Angela Correa =

American singer-songwriter

- Origin: Los Angeles
- Genres: Indie pop Dream pop Shoegaze
- Labels: Another Room Recordings
- Members: Angela Correa

Angela Correa is an American singer-songwriter.

== History ==
Correa is originally from Yuba City, California. She moved from San Diego, where she had attended college, to Los Angeles and formed the band Correatown in 2007. The name of the band was taken from a nickname a friend had given her.

== Reception ==
In addition to her success as a musician, a number of her songs have been used in popular American television series. "All The World (I Tell Myself)" was the background music during the series finale of Ugly Betty when Betty says goodbye to all her family at their house in Queens, and was also used in The Lucky One. "Shine Right Through", "Further", "Believe" and "Play" have all been used in Grey's Anatomy, as well as "Everything, All At Once" and "All The World (I Tell Myself)". Her music has also been used in How I Met Your Mother and Brothers and Sisters. Her song "The Point" was used on the Netflix Limited Series, The Trials of Gabriel Fernandez, in 2020.

She also provided the singing voice for Darlene Madison (played onscreen by Jenna Fischer) in the movie Walk Hard: The Dewey Cox Story.

Correa is also a member of the folk duo Les Shelleys, a project created with Tom Brosseau in 2003. Their first record, Les Shelleys, was released in fall 2010 by Brighton's FatCat Records. They toured both the US and Europe extensively in support of the album throughout 2010.

== Discography ==
- Red Room Songs by Angela Correa (December 2002)
- Murder Ballads by Angela Correa (December 2004)
- Correatown by Angela Correa (March 2005)
- Echoes EP by Correatown (January 2008)
- India Ink Split 7 by Correatown (May 2008)
- Spark. Burn. Fade. by Correatown (May 2009)
- Les Shelleys by Les Shelleys (September/November 2010)
- Etch The Line by Correatown (May 2011)
- Pleiades by Correatown (16 October 2013)
- Sleep and Other Drugs by Correatown (21 October 2014)
- Embrace The Fuzzy Unknown (2015)
