= Caught the Blast =

Studio album by Party of One
- Released: May 27, 2003
- Recorded: December 2000–May 2001
- Genre: Indie rock
- Length: 55:06
- Label: FatCat

Party of One chronology
Caught the Blast (2003)	Streetside Surprise (2014)

Caught the Blast is the first full-length album by Minnesota-based indie rock band Party of One, released on May 27, 2003, on FatCat Records.

== Critical reception ==
Professional ratings
Review scores
Source	Rating
AllMusic	2/5 stars
In Music We Trust	A−
Pitchfork	3.0/10
Spin	B+
Sydney Morning Herald	4/5 stars
Tom Hull – on the Web	A−
The Village Voice	A−

Caught the Blast received mostly positive reviews. Robert Christgau, in The Village Voice, wrote that "...like so many lo-fi note-missers of enduring social value, they're winningly enthusiastic about their own negativity." Terry Sawyer of PopMatters said in 2003 that Caught the Blast was "one of the best records I've heard this year," and after attending a live show where Party of One performed, described Fifteen's stage presence as "petulantly misanthropic." Seattle Weekly's Rod Smith wrote that "[Fifteen's] refusal to wax sanctimonious or get flinchy in even the ugliest situations is part of why Fifteen's party runs so well." Another positive review of this album came from the Washington City Paper, where Andrew Beaujon wrote that it was "...the most fun, most disconcerting way to amuse yourself since the BBC's The League of Gentlemen," and their single "Snap You Like a Twig," the lead track on Caught the Blast, received a positive review from Drowned in Sound, where "Shoo" wrote that the song was "an expansive track oblique with orphaned emotion, latent suggestions of insurrection, loss, crushing defeats, sexual recklessness, domination, upside-down worldview." In The Washington Post, Mark Jenkins wrote that "Many of the album's tracks are basically folk-blues laments, but they're set to percolating rhythms and updated with unexpected asides..."

Other reviewers were less positive to the album upon its release. For example, Allmusic reviewer Andy Kellman wrote that the album "probably sounds great to anyone who has never heard a Dischord release with a copyright date earlier than 1995," and Pitchfork Media's Michael Idov wrote that "every note produced by every instrument on Caught the Blast has been meticulously designed to suck."

== Track listing ==
1. Snap You Like a Twig
2. Six Million Anonymous Deceased
3. Scorch the Brainwave
4. Belgrade Sends its Regards
5. Shotgun Funeral
6. Synagogue Chamber Waltz
7. Midnight Gypsy
8. Baghdad Boogie
9. Fine Line Between Us
10. Slide Away
11. Baby Doll
12. Shock to the System

== Personnel ==
- Eric Fifteen—Lead vocals, songwriting
- Terrika Kleinknecht—Bass guitar
- Geoff McKusick—Drums
