= Semiconductor (disambiguation) =

A semiconductor is a material with electrical conductivity due to electron flow intermediate in magnitude between that of a conductor and an insulator.

Semiconductor or semi-conductor may also refer to:

- Semiconductor device, an electronic component that exploits the electronic properties of semiconductor materials
- Semi-Conductor (album), a compilation album by Larry Fast
- Semiconductor (artists), also known as Semiconductor Films, names used by British art duo Ruth Jarman and Joe Gerhardt
