= Upper Room (disambiguation) =

The Upper Room is location of the Last Supper that Jesus Christ took with his disciples.

The Upper Room may also refer to:

- The Cenacle, the traditional site of the Last Supper.
- The Upper Room (band), a defunct UK rock music band
- The Upper Room (Devotional and Ministry Organization), a worldwide publisher of the daily devotional guide of the same name
- The Upper Room (paintings), an installation of paintings by Chris Ofili
- In the Upper Room, a ballet by U.S. choreographer Twyla Tharp, first performed in 1986
- "The Upper Room", a song made popular by Mahalia Jackson
