= Odonis Odonis =

Canadian industrial band

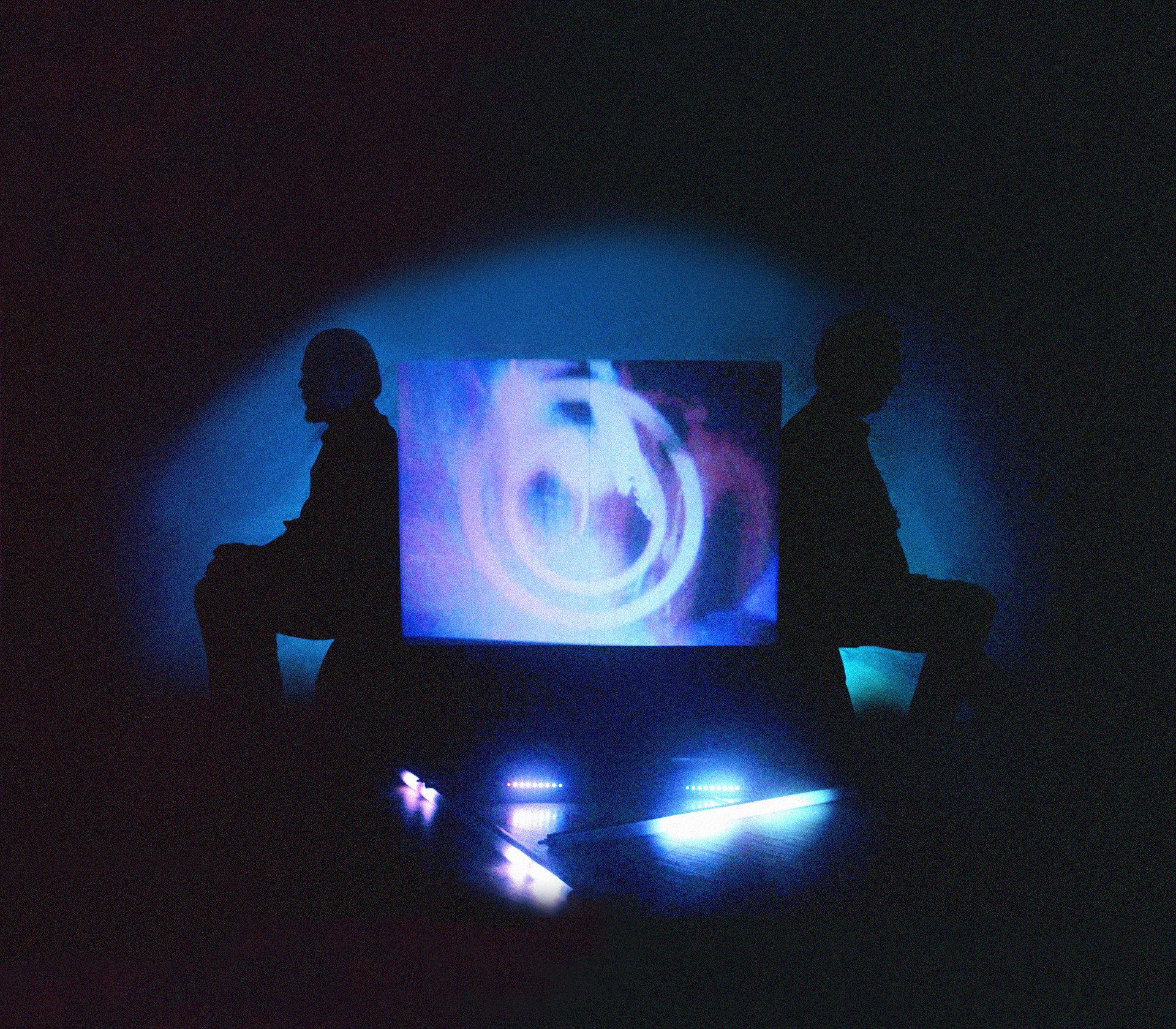
- Odonis Odonis performing in 2021

Background information
- Origin: Toronto, Ontario, Canada
- Genres: Industrial; Electronic
- Years active: 2009–present
- Labels: FatCat Records; Hand Drawn Dracula; Buzz Records; felte; Geertruida; Telephone Explosion Records; Daps Records; Palmist
- Members: Dean Tzenos; Denholm Whale
- Past members: Chris Slorach; Jarod Gibson
- Website: odonisodonis.com

Odonis Odonis are a Canadian industrial and electronic music group from Toronto, Ontario.

== History ==
Odonis Odonis was formed by Dean Tzenos after he left Ten Kens, and also included Jarod Gibson and Denholm Whale. In 2009 the trio recorded a group of tracks that would become their album Hard Boiled Soft Boiled, but then released a different set of material as their debut album Hollandaze in 2011. That album appeared on the !earshot Campus and Community National Top 50 Albums chart in January 2012.

Hard Boiled Soft Boiled, was eventually released in 2014. The album was marked by a dichotomy between the first half of the album, which comprised aggressive and hard-edged industrial music, and the second half, which softened into shoegaze-influenced electronic dream pop. In addition to the album's Polaris nomination, the band received a Prism Prize nomination in 2015 for their video "Order in the Court", directed by Lee Stringle.

In 2016, the band followed up with their third album, Post Plague. The compact disc version was released by felte, the vinyl version by felte and Telephone Explosion Records and the compact cassette tape version by Geertruida.

In 2017, the band released their fourth album, No Pop. The record received an 8.1 rating from Pitchfork

Their fifth album, Spectrums, was released on October 15, 2021. The album was nominated for the 2023 Juno for Electronic Album of The Year.

== Discography ==
=== Studio albums ===
Title	Details
Hollandaze	Released: October 27, 2011; Label: FatCat Records; Format: Cassette, CD, Digital download, LP
Hard Boiled Soft Boiled	Released: April 25, 2014; Label: Buzz Records; Format: Cassette, CD, Digital download, LP
Post Plague	Released: June 27, 2016; Label: Felte Records/Geertruida/Telephone Explosion Records; Format: Cassette, CD, Digital download, LP
No Pop	Released: October 20, 2017; Label: Felte Records; Format: CD, Digital download, LP
Spectrums	Released: October 25, 2021; Label: Felte Records; Format: Digital download, LP
Odonis Odonis	Released: November 14, 2025; Label: Royal Mountain Records; Format: CD, Digital download, LP

=== Extended plays ===
Title	Details
Lotus Plaza/Odonis Odonis	Released: July 18, 2011; Label: Palmist (FatCat); Format: CD, Digital download, LP
Better	Released: April 16, 2013; Label: Buzz Records; Format: Digital download, LP
Reaction	Released: April 12, 2019; Label: Felte Records; Format: Digital Download, LP
ICON	Released: June 19, 2023; Label: Felte Records; Format: Digital Download, LP

== Awards and nominations ==
Year	Award	Category	Nominee(s)	Result	Ref.
2023	Juno Awards	Electronic Album of the Year	Spectrums	Nominated	
