= Christopher Duncan =

Christopher Duncan may refer to:

- Christopher Duncan (Brookside) (active 1986–1988), character on Brookside
- Christopher B. Duncan (born 1964), American actor
- Chris Duncan (1981–2019), American baseball player
- C Duncan (born 1989), Scottish composer and singer
