= Alejandra and Aeron =

Spanish-American artist duo (Alejandra born 1977; Aeron born 1971)

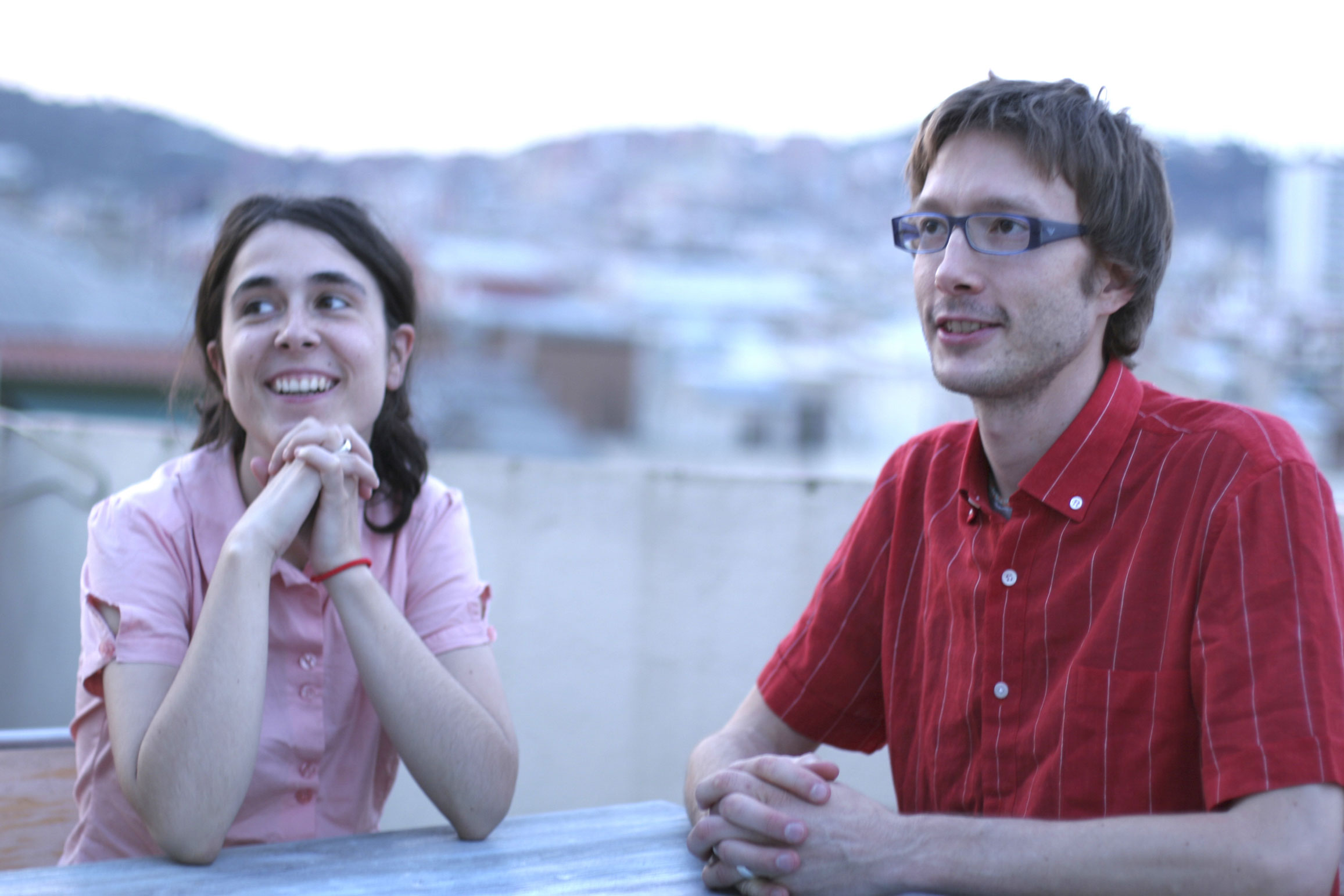
Barcelona, Spain in 2004

Alejandra and Aeron, also known as Bergman and Salinas, are Alejandra Salinas (Spanish: born 1977 in La Rioja) and Aeron Bergman (American: born 1971 in Detroit), artists living in Detroit, Michigan. They are an artist duo producing media, performance, internet, sound and sculptural works and objects in an interdisciplinary, conceptual yet socially engaged practice.

== Biography ==
Bergman and Salinas' work has been exhibited internationally including at the 4th Athens Biennale; the Bergen Assembly Triennial; Steirischer Herbst in Graz; Eastside Projects in Birmingham, UK; Serralves Museum in Porto; ICC Tokyo; DAC in New York; Taipei Fine Art Museum; Van Abbemuseum in Eindhoven, The Netherlands; Centre Georges-Pompidou and Palais de Tokyo in Paris; IMO and Nikolaj Kunsthal in Copenhagen; Henie Onstad Art Center, Kunstnernes Hus and 0047 in Oslo.

Their video work has been screened at the Walter Reade Theater at Lincoln Center in New York City; e-flux Berlin; CCA Glasgow and Dundee Contemporary Arts in Scotland; Museum of Contemporary Art Detroit; Museum of Contemporary Art Vojvodina Novi Sad and elsewhere. They have also performed in venues around the world including the Knitting Factory in New York; Overgaden Institute for Contemporary Art in Copenhagen; Museum of Contemporary Art Oslo and MUDAM Luxembourg.

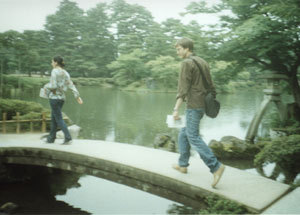
Kanazawa, Japan in 2003.

== INCA ==
Bergman and Salinas founded the Institute for New Connotative Action (INCA) in Detroit in 2011 and in Seattle in 2013. This artist-run initiative focuses on language as art, particularly emphasizing issues of transformation and translation. As described by Salinas: "the idea was always to frame INCA the 'institute' as a parody that was also sincere in our mission." Bergman and Salinas have curated over 40 exhibitions and events at INCA and have hosted artist's talks, lectures and poetry readings. The artists who have exhibited at INCA include Sondra Perry, Chris Kraus, Henrik Plenge Jakobsen, Cia Rinne, Mikko Kuorinki and Andreas Bunte.

Bergman and Salinas say in Temporary Art Review about their motivation for running INCA: We like working with great people. Also, we want to focus attention on the social life of art rather than the objects themselves. In Spain and South America, the "tertulia" tradition draws attention to the social life of art and literature without institutional regulation. Our motivation was to produce an independent, quasi-institution that would burn itself out before becoming a self-replicating zombie.

In October 2015, INCA was a part of the symposium Alternative Currencies: Tactics for Staying Relevant and Radical that was held at The Galleries at Moore, Philadelphia. The forum gathered independent contemporary art groups and from around America in a collective exploration of what it means to be (and stay) "alternative".

== Teaching ==
Bergman was a professor at the Oslo National Academy of the Arts in Norway and both Bergman and Salinas were artists in residence at the University of Washington, and were professors and chair at Pacific Northwest College of Art from 2017 to 2022.

== Sound works ==
Their 2005 album Be Mine consists of interviews of people talking about love, and the 1999 Children's Record was made by asking people to sing songs they can remember from their childhood. Their early works are among the first experiments with folk and laptop electronic music. This is especially noted in Ruinas Encantadas (winner of an honorary mention in Prix Ars Electronica 2001) and Porto: Folklore Fragments Volume 2. The track Water Jota in 1213442 from the former consists almost entirely of water drop sounds, arranged according to the structure of a folk dance; the artists themselves comment on such concepts that the record "considers the past, while not repeating it."

In 2002 the duo won an Award of Distinction in Digital Music for their audio installation "Revisionland" from the Prix Ars Electronica in Linz, Austria. They have released 12 critically acclaimed full length audio CDs on labels such as Orthlorng Musork, Fat Cat, Tomlab and their own label, Lucky Kitchen. Bergman/Salinas have been commissioned to produce sound works by institutions such as WDR West German radio and Swedish National Radio. Since 2011 Bergman/Salinas have co-directed INCA, an artist-run space and artist in residency in Detroit, USA and in 2013 they opened INCA Seattle.

== Visual art ==
Bergman and Salinas have shown in solo and group exhibitions in museums and art centers around the world such as the NTT InterCommunication Center (ICC) in Tokyo, Centre Pompidou in Paris, Nikolaj Kunsthal in Copenhagen, Serralves Museum of Contemporary Art in Porto, VanAbbe Museum in Eindhoven, Dumbo Arts Center (DAC) in New York, Kunstnernes Hus, Henie Onstad Art Center and 0047 Gallery in Oslo, Centre de Cultura Contemporània de Barcelona (CCCB) and Centro de Arte Contemporaneo Santa Monica, both in Barcelona. Wildflowers was shown in the Shrinking Cities exhibition in Detroit MOCAD 2007 and in Gothenburg, Sweden, also 2007, and features interviews with individuals working in grassroots organizations in Detroit. They have recently done performances and installations at U.K.S. art center and Kunstnernes hus art center both in Oslo, Norway. They have also conceived and curated a controversial website at https://web.archive.org/web/20181116075419/http://www.nobelprize.no/, with international artists such as Marjetica Potrc, Michel Auder, Peter Campus, Kenneth Goldsmith, Momus, Sharmila Samant and others.

== Lucky Kitchen ==
In addition to their own work, Bergman and Salinas have run the independent audio publisher Lucky Kitchen since 1997. Some of the artists published on Lucky Kitchen are Stephen Vitiello, Tetsu Inoue, Matmos, Joshua Abrams and Liz Payne (from Town and Country) Stephan Mathieu, and Halvorson Pavone.

== Discography ==
- Bostonpopsonreverbformydeadgrandpa (1997)
- Children's Record (1999)
- The Tale of the Unhappy American (2000)
- Home Tapes (2000)
- Ruinas Encantadas (2001)
- La Rioja (2001)
- Underwater Villages (2001)
- The Tale of Pip (2001)
- Bousha Blue Blazes (2003)
- Scotch Monsters (2002/3)
- Lost Cat (2004)
- Be Mine (2005)
- Porto (2005)
- Billowy Mass (2007)
- Rendeiras, Hasselblad and Bell & Howell 10" picture disc (2008)
