= Isle of Wight Festival 2006 =

Music festival

- Genre: rock, pop
- Dates: 9–11 June 2006
- Locations: Seaclose Park, Newport, Isle of Wight, UK
- Website: isleofwightfestival.com

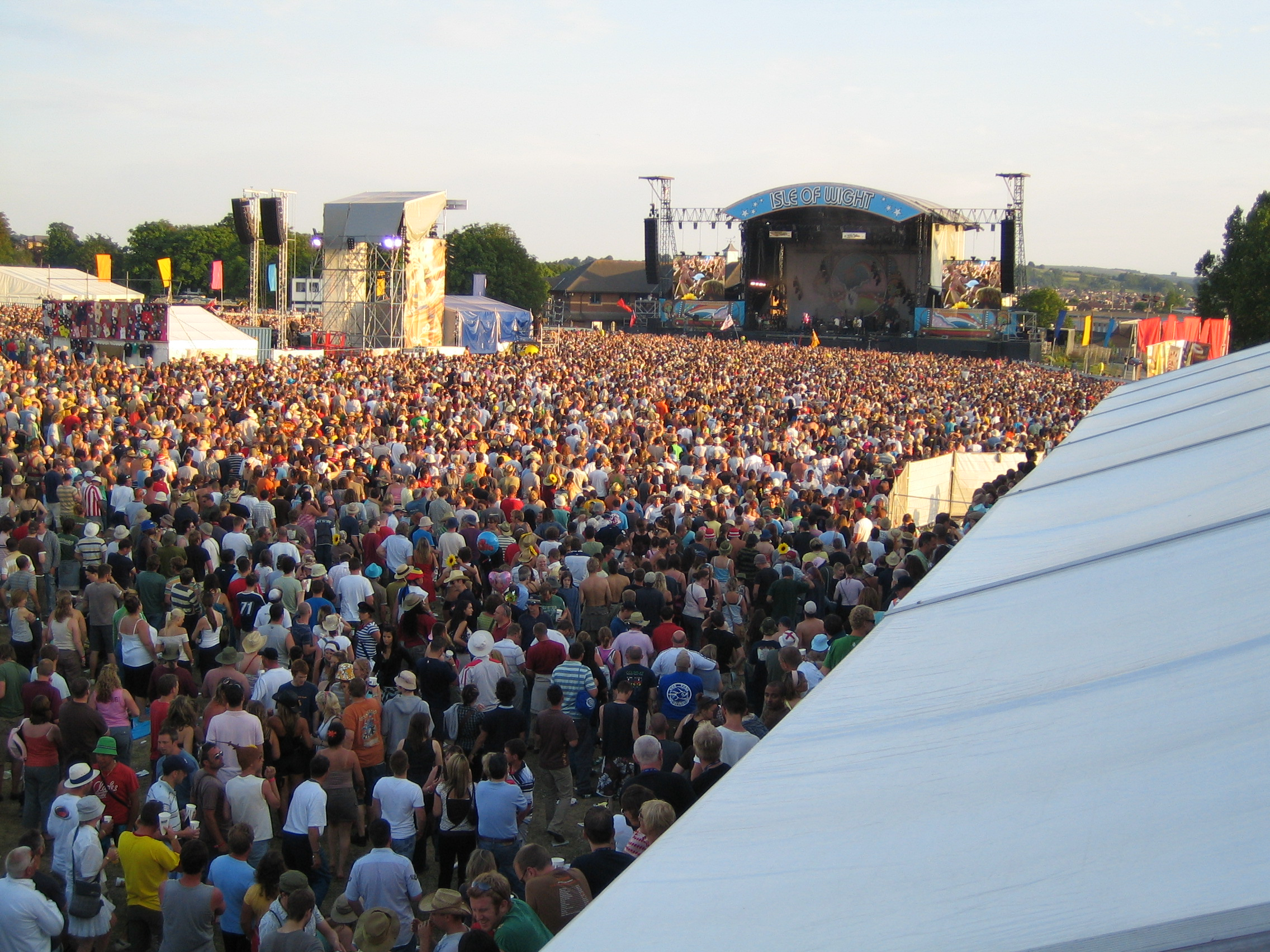
View of the main stage

The Isle of Wight Festival 2006 was the fifth revived Isle of Wight Festival on the Seaclose Park site in Newport on the Isle of Wight. It took place between 9 and 11 June 2006. The attendance was around 55,000 and the event was dubbed the biggest festival in England, because Glastonbury was on its break year. It was the last of three consecutive years of Nokia sponsorship, which saw the likes of The Who, David Bowie and R.E.M. grace the Island stage.

New additions to the festival site included the Bandstand, which allowed local bands to perform, the Carling warm beer amnesty and the Strawberry fields a large area of bars and music venues. The festival achieved island-wide promotion by displaying the 2006 logo on Isle of Wight service buses. These buses were used to shuttle festival goers to a commemorative statue of Jimi Hendrix at Dimbola Lodge in Freshwater Bay near Afton Down (where the 1970 festival was staged).

The festival was filmed and highlights were shown on late night broadcasts on Channel 4. Notable moments included Coldplay covering Lou Reed's 1972 song 'Perfect Day' during their Sunday night headline performance after the ex-Velvet Underground frontman failed to play it in his 'unpredictable' set earlier in the day. Coldplay singer Chris Martin told media that Lou Reed had asked them to do the cover to 'placate the crowd'. The Sunday also saw Procol Harum return to the festival for the first time since they played at the original version of the festival in 1970.

== Line Up ==
=== Friday ===
- The Prodigy
- Placebo
- Goldfrapp
- The Rakes
- Morning Runner

=== Saturday ===
- Foo Fighters
- Primal Scream
- Editors
- Dirty Pretty Things
- The Kooks
- The Proclaimers
- Suzanne Vega
- The Upper Room
- 747's
- The On Offs

=== Sunday ===
- Coldplay
- Richard Ashcroft
- Lou Reed
- Maxïmo Park
- Kubb
- Procol Harum
- Delays
- Marjorie Fair
- CatHead
- The Windows
- Skyline Heroes
