= Silje Nes =

Silje Nes (born 25 November 1980 in Leikanger) is a Norwegian multi-instrumentalist, singer and sound artist. She has released two albums on British label Fat Cat Records. She released her first album, Ames Room, in December 2007. Nes' second album, Opticks, was released on 12 September 2010. As a sound artist she creates sound installations that take form as environments developing over time.

Nes has a background as a classical pianist. On her albums she plays all instruments, arranges, and produces.
