= Pôt-pot =

Irish-Portuguese psychedelic rock band

- Origin: Cork, Ireland, Lisbon, Portugal
- Genres: Space rock, psychedelic rock, experimental rock
- Years active: 2020–present
- Labels: Felte, Blowtorch, Warm Milk Recordings
- Members: Mark Waldron-Hyden; Joe Armitage; Michael Oliver Smith; Elaine Malone; Sara Leslie

pôt-pot is an Irish-Portuguese psychedelic rock and krautrock quintet based in Lisbon. Formed by musicians from the Cork DIY music scene, the band perform "motorik" rhythms, harmonium drones, and hypnotic male-female vocal harmonies.

== History and career ==
The band was formed by multi-instrumentalist Mark Waldron-Hyden alongside Elaine Malone, Sara Leslie, Mykle "Ollie" Oliver Smith, and Joe Armitage. Drawing on a transient lifestyle between Ireland and Portugal, the group developed a sound that blends the repetitive structures of CAN and Neu! with the dark textures of Joy Division. In August 2025, the group released the single "22° Halo,". Then in September 2025, they released their debut full-length album, Warsaw 480km, through the Los Angeles-based label Felte Records. The album was named as one of BBC Radio 6 Music's Albums of the Year for 2025, with presenter Deb Grant selecting it for special feature during the network's annual celebration. The record was also shortlisted for the Choice Music Prize Irish Album of the Year.

== Live performances ==
They have performed at Grauzone Festival and have opened for The Mary Wallopers, including nights at Vicar Street, Dublin. Following their album's release, the band embarked on a European and UK tour in early 2026.

== Discography ==
=== Studio albums ===
- The High Civilizations (2020, Warm Milk Recordings)
- Warsaw 480km (2025, Felte Records)

=== EP ===
- Ode To A (EP, 2023)
- Going Insane (EP, 2024)
