= Tal National =

- Origin: Niamey, Niger
- Genres: West African, Neo-traditional
- Years active: 2000–present
- Label: FatCat Records
- Website: talnational.bandcamp.com

Tal National is a band from Niamey, Niger formed in 2000. Founded and led by guitarist Hamadal Issoufou Moumine (known as Almeida), the band plays a style they call neo-traditional music. They have been described as Niger's most popular band.

The band's membership includes people from several of Niger's ethnic groups, including Songhai, Fulani, Hausa, and Tuareg peoples. They signed with UK-based FatCat Records in 2013, releasing the albums Kaani, Zoy Zoy, and Tantabara internationally.

== Discography ==
- Apokte (2006)
- A-Na Waya (2009)
- Kaani (2012; released internationally 2013, FatCat Records)
- Zoy Zoy (2015, FatCat Records)
- Tantabara (2018, FatCat Records)

== See also ==
- Music of Niger
