= Les Shelleys =

Studio album by Les Shelleys
- Released: 2010
- Recorded: 2010
- Genre: Folk
- Label: FatCat Records
- Producer: Les Shelleys

Professional ratings
Review scores
Source	Rating
AllMusic	3.5/5 stars
Gaffa	5/6 stars

Les Shelleys was an American folk duo consisting of Tom Brosseau and Angela Correa. Both members of the duo had performed folk music independently before forming the duo in 2010. They released one studio album of the same name that year.

== Track listing ==
No.	Title	Writer(s)	Length
1.	"The World Is Waiting for the Sunrise"	Lockhart, Seitz	1:39
2.	"The Late John Garfield Blues"	Prine	2:28
3.	"Green Door"	Davie, Moore	1:38
4.	"Cocktails for Two"	Johnston, Coslow	2:32
5.	"The Band Played On"	Palmer, Ward	2:19
6.	"Rum and Coca-Cola"	Sullavan, Amsterdam, Girlando	2:38
7.	"Billy"	Dylan	2:59
8.	"The Lonesome Death of Hattie Carroll"	Dylan	3:15
9.	"Oh Babe, It Aint No Lie"	Cotten	3:03
10.	"Pastures of Plenty"	Guthrie	3:32
11.	"Deep Purple"	Parish, DeRose	1:59
12.	"Wheel of Fortune"	Benjamin, Weiss	2:55
