= Tall Ships (band) =

English indie rock band from Brighton

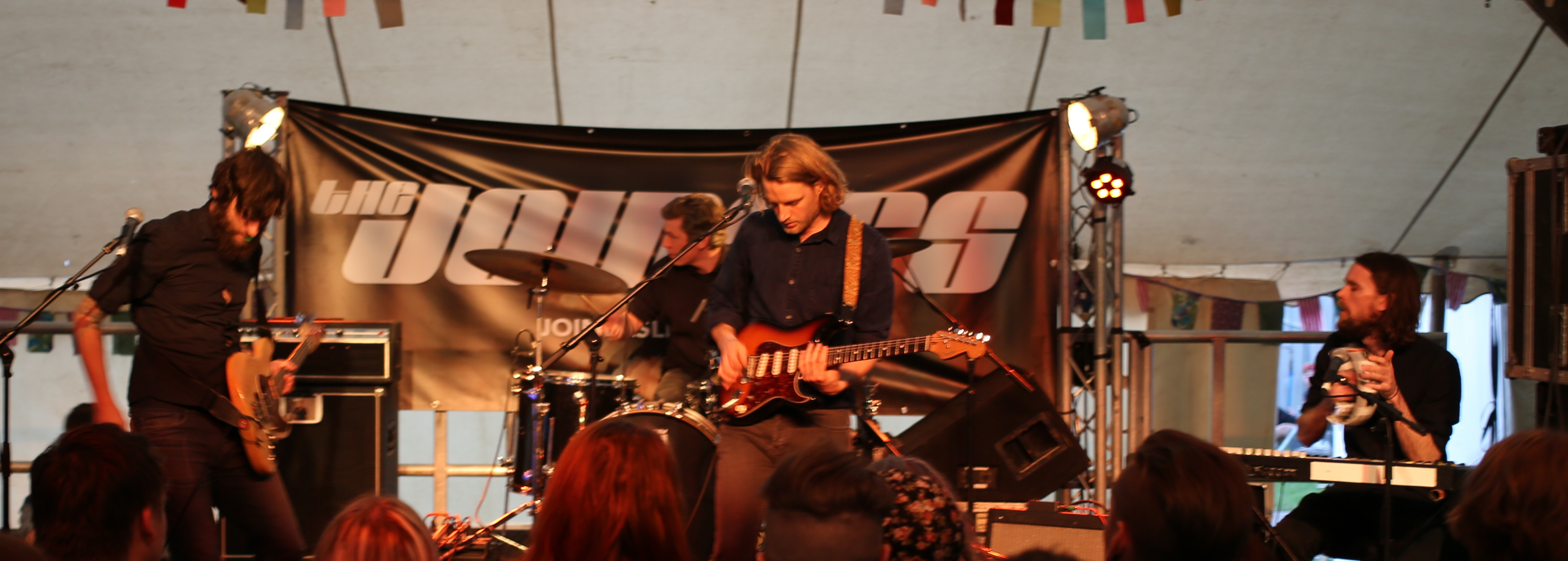
- Tall Ships live at Common People, Southampton 2016

Background information
- Origin: Falmouth, Cornwall, England
- Genres: Alternative rock, indie rock, math rock
- Years active: 2008–2017
- Labels: Big Scary Monsters; Blood and Biscuits; FatCat Records
- Past members: Ric Phethean; Matt Parker; Jamie Bush; James Elliot Field

Tall Ships were an English indie rock band, formed in 2009 whilst studying in Falmouth and based in Brighton, England. The band was composed of lead singer/guitarist Ric Phethean, bassist/backing vocalist Matt Parker, drummer Jamie Bush and keyboardist James Elliot Field.

The band released two EPs and their debut album Everything Touching via Big Scary Monster Records before disappearing for three years. They released their second album Impressions in February 2017.

The band announced their disbandment in September 2017 and performed three farewell shows across England in the following December.

== Biography ==
Formed whilst studying at Falmouth University, Phethean and Bush grew up together just outside of Brighton, and Parker grew up in Worcester.

The band released their self-titled EP on Big Scary Monster Records in early 2010, with their second EP ‘There is Nothing But Chemistry Here’ being released in October 2010 on Big Scary Monsters and Blood and Biscuits. They released their debut album Everything Touching on 8 October 2012 via Blood and Biscuits/Big Scary Monsters. The band received notable airplay from Huw Stevens and Zane Lowe at the BBC, and headlined the BBC Introducing Stage at the Reading and Leeds Festivals in 2012. Whilst touring their debut album, they enlisted producer James Elliot Field as an additional live member. Previously a member of Big Scary Monsters-signed Tubelord, he soon became a permanent member of the band. When questioned about the math rock tag the band gained, Phethean stated that "it was kind of coincidence. The first gig we ever played was with a band called Tubelord. They were signed to Big Scary Monsters records and they basically got us on some more shows with them and introduced us to the record label. That label is pretty big in the math rock scene. That’s how we got that tag. It’s something that we’ve not always felt fit too well. We’ve always felt more like a indie band or a rock band really".

The band then disappeared, with bassist Matt Parker later stating that "there was a lot of emotional, financial and physical hindrance to all of us to varying degrees, so we just needed a break. We had to go and work and pay off all those debts" and that "the mental health of me and Ric needed a bit of attention". Phethean later revealed that in downtime from the band, he worked as a barman, builder, landscape gardner and grave digger. More recently, he worked as a flower arranger on a photo shoot for Vogue.

They re-appeared in May 2015 with the limited edition 7"-only single Will To Life via Too Pure. The single displayed a change in direction from math rock to a more general indie/alternative rock sound. In September 2016, the band announced that they had signed to FatCat Records and released new single Meditations on Loss. In October 2016, the band toured the UK supporting Lonely The Brave. In March 2017, the band released their second album Impressions. Commenting on the change in direction, Parker stated that "our earlier stuff was quite tied into that math rock and looping stuff but we’re all suckers for 4/4 and pop songs and we grew up listening to that sort of music so I guess it was a natural progression". Delayed from the original early-February release due to a delay in production for the vinyl LP pressing, the band undertook a short UK in late February/early March. The first two dates of the tour were postponed until May, with further dates added to form another short tour.

On 26 September 2017, Tall Ships announced their disbandment via social media and performed three farewell shows across England in Bristol, Leeds and London, which took place 14–16 December of the same year. Bassist Matt Parker had previously stated in March 2017 that the band "started writing the third record and that’s gonna be a quick turnaround, we wanna make sure that its out super-quick! We’ve got an idea of how we want it to sound and how we’re gonna write it. It should be a quicker process, we very much know what we’re gonna do".

== Band members ==
- Ric Phethean – vocals, guitar, keyboards, electronics
- Matt Parker – bass guitar, backing vocals, keyboards
- Jamie Bush – drums
- James Elliot Field – keyboards, electronics

== Discography ==
=== Studio albums ===
- Everything Touching (Big Scary Monsters/Blood and Biscuits, 8 October 2012)
- Impressions (Fatcat Records, 10 February 2017)

=== EPs and singles ===
- Tall Ships – EP (Big Scary Monsters/Blood and Biscuits, February 2010)
- There is Nothing But Chemistry Here – EP (Big Scary Monsters/Blood and Biscuits, October 2010)
- "Plate Tectonics" (Big Scary Monsters/Blood and Biscuits, 2011)
- "Hit The Floor" (Big Scary Monsters/Blood and Biscuits, 2011)
- "Gallop" (Big Scary Monsters/Blood and Biscuits, 2012)
- "T=0" (Big Scary Monsters/Blood and Biscuits, 2012)
- "Will to Life" (Too Pure, 2015)
- "Meditations on Loss" (Fatcat Records, 2016)
