= The Twilight Sad (EP) =

EP by the Twilight Sad
- Released: 14 November 2006
- Recorded: 2006
- Studios: CaVa Studios, Glasgow
- Genres: Indie rock, shoegaze
- Length: 25:53
- Language: Scottish English
- Label: Fat Cat
- Producer: The Twilight Sad

The Twilight Sad chronology
The Twilight Sad (2006)	Fourteen Autumns & Fifteen Winters (2007)

The Twilight Sad is the debut EP by the Twilight Sad, recorded at Paulshalls Studios released on 14 November 2006 on Fat Cat Records. The EP was only released on CD in the United States. Regarding its US-only release, former bassist Craig Orzel stated that "the American side of Fat Cat wanted a release to announce our arrival, so they got that. I think the UK side were, initially, more interested in albums than EPs." The EP was mixed by composer and Fat Cat labelmate Max Richter.

"That Summer, at Home I Had Become the Invisible Boy", "Last Year's Rain Didn't Fall Quite So Hard", and "And She Would Darken the Memory" also appear on the band's debut album, Fourteen Autumns & Fifteen Winters, which followed the EP in April 2007.

The EP garnered warm critical reception, with independent music website Delusions of Adequacy praising "the cathartic racket" of the songs as "uplifting and expansive, on the verge of overwhelming with sound, sweeping the listener away from the harsh, earth-bound lyrics and delivery" and hailing the EP as "a bracing distillation of what The Twilight Sad does best, marrying spare to expansive sonics with bitter, sharp, sometimes enigmatic lyrics and a powerful, emotional sing-talking delivery by James Graham, as skeletons are rattled in the old family closet."

== Critical reception ==
Professional ratings
Review scores
Source	Rating
AllMusic	3.5/5 stars
Pitchfork	(7.8/10)

Pitchfork reviewer Marc Hogan awarded the EP a 7.8 out of 10 rating, praising the band's "stadium anthem" technique through "lip-quivering emotion punctuated with explosions." Treble zine reviewer Herbert Vigilla stated that the EP shows the band "have a knack for crafting cathartic, visceral shoegazer anthems." Delusions of Adequacy also praised the band's "structural 'formula'" for the songs as "effective and breath-taking", and James Graham's "stark reminisces and recriminations ... expressively wrapped in his pronounced Scottish accent" and lyrics "rife with vague to pointed accusations, which are parsed out piecemeal, giving room for the listener to imagine a stunted familial environment where relationships are divided into victim and perpetrator, where one person talks to the other and vice versa, conversations in an unhappy home, and a looking back at it all through the distance of time and childhood memories."

== Track listing ==
All tracks are written by Andy MacFarlane and James Graham; arranged by The Twilight Sad.

No.	Title	Length
1.	"But When She Left, Gone Was the Glow"	3:55
2.	"That Summer, at Home I Had Become the Invisible Boy"	4:48
3.	"Last Year's Rain Didn't Fall Quite So Hard"	2:37
4.	"And She Would Darken the Memory"	5:44
5.	"Three Seconds of Dead Air"	8:47

== Personnel ==
The Twilight Sad

- James Graham – vocals
- Andy MacFarlane – guitars, accordion
- Craig Orzel – bass
- Mark Devine – drums, percussion

Recording personnel

- The Twilight Sad – production, mixing
- Max Richter – mixing
- David Paterson – engineering
- Pam Smith – engineering
- Alan Douches – mastering
- dlt – artwork
