= Semiconductor (artists) =

Semiconductor (also Semiconductor Films) is UK artist duo Ruth Jarman and Joe Gerhardt. They have been working together for over twenty years producing visually and intellectually engaging moving image works which explore the material nature of our world and how we experience it through the lens of science and technology, questioning how these devices mediate our experiences. Their unique approach has won them many awards, commissions and prestigious fellowships including; SónarPLANTA 2016 commission, Collide @ CERN Ars Electronica Award 2015, Jerwood Open Forest 2015 and Samsung Art + Prize 2012. Exhibitions and screenings include; The Universe and Art, Mori Art Museum, Tokyo, Japan, 2016; Infosphere, ZKM, Karlsruhe, 2016; Quantum of Disorder, Museum Haus Konstruktiv, Zurich, 2015; Da Vinci: Shaping the Future, ArtScience Museum, Singapore, 2014; Let There Be Light, House of Electronic Arts, Basel 2013 (solo show); Field Conditions, San Francisco Museum of Modern Art, 2012; International Film Festival Rotterdam, 2012; New York Film Festival: Views from the Avant Garde, 2012; European Media Art Festival, 2012; Worlds in the Making, FACT, Liverpool 2011 (solo show); Earth; Art of a Changing World, Royal Academy of Arts, London, 2009 and Sundance Film Festival, 2009.

== History ==
Ruth Jarman (b. 1973) and Joe Gerhardt (b. 1972) started making art as Semiconductor in 1997. Their art uses computer animation to explore science, time, scale, and natural forces. They work in different media ranging from single and multichannel video works, sound, installations, performance and DVD releases. They are currently based in Brighton U.K. They have completed a number of fellowships and residencies at CERN, Geneva, Switzerland; The Smithsonian Institution at The National Museum of Natural History, Washington DC, USA; Gulbenkian Galapagos Artists Residency; Exploratorium, San Francisco, USA; The NASA Space Sciences Laboratories UC Berkeley California USA; Berwick Gymnasium Fellowship Berwick-Upon-Tweed UK and Couvent des Récollets Paris.

They have performed and exhibited at Biennale of Sydney, Venice Biennale, Hirshhorn Museum Smithsonian Institution Washington DC USA, Nuit Blanche Paris, Institute of Contemporary Arts London, San Francisco Museum of Modern Art, Prague Contemporary Art Festival, Careof Gallery Milan, EMAF Osnabruck, and Beaconsfield Gallery London.

== Commissions, awards, collections ==
- 4th Audemars Piguet Commission at Art Basel, 2018
- Sorigué purchase of Earthworks for their collection, 2016
- Sónar Planta commission, Barcelona, Spain, 2016
- Quantum Shorts Prize, Scientific American and Centre for Quantum Technologies, National University of Singapore, 2015
- ACE Lottery Funding to produce Where Shapes Come From, 2015
- Pump House Gallery, London, 2015
- Shortlisted for the Forest of Dean Sculpture Trail, 2015
- ArtScience Museum, Singapore, 2014
- Jerwood Open Forest Commission, UK, 2014
- Chichester Festival Theatre, UK. Site specific moving image commission, 2014
- Swarovski commission, 2013.
- Samsung Art + Prize 2012.
- ‘Art and Science Award’ at Ann Arbor Film Festival 2012.
- ‘Golden Gate Award for New Visions’ at San Francisco International Film Festival 2012.
- Prix Ars Electronica, Honorary Mention 2011.
- Exploratorium, San Francisco USA 2010-ongoing
- Gulbenkian Galapagos Artist Fellowship 2010
- Smithsonian Artists Research Fellowship 2010
- Awarded the Nature Scientific Merit award for Magnetic Movie at Imagine Science Film Festival, New York 2009.
- Magnetic Movie was purchased by the Hirshhorn Museum, Washington for the permanent collection 2008.
- Special Mention and Best International Experimental Short for Magnetic Movie at Leeds International Film Festival 2008.
- Best Film for Magnetic Movie at Cutting Edge at the British Animation Awards 2008.
- Second prize by the Science Film Festival for Brilliant Noise, a Coruna Spain, 2008.
- Best Experimental Film for Magnetic Movie at Tirana International Film Festival 2007.
- Second prize at Onion City Experimental Film and Video Festival for Brilliant Noise, 2006.
- Best Video for Brilliant Noise at Experimental Film and Video Festival, Seoul, Korea 2006.

== Selected solo exhibitions ==
- 2019 The Technological Sublime, City Gallery, Wellington, New Zealand
- 2018 Halo, The 4th Audemars Piguet Commission at Art Basel, Switzerland
- 2018 The View from Nowhere, Le Lieu Unique, Nantes, France
- 2017 Parting the Waves, Axiom Art and Science Gallery, Tokyo, Japan
- 2017 Where Shapes Come From, Phoenix, Leicester, UK
- 2016 Earthworks, Sonar Planta, Sonar Festival, Barcelona
- 2014 Cosmos, Jerwood Open Forest, Alice Holt Forest, UK
- 2013 Let There Be Light, House of Electronic Arts, Basel, Switzerland
- 2011 Worlds in the Making, FACT, Liverpool, UK
- 2011 Solar Systems, Phoenix Brighton, UK
- 2011 Semiconductor, Nuit Blanche, Paris, France
- 2010 Semiconductor, Institute of Modern Art, Brisbane, Australia
- 2010 Heliocentric, Northern Gallery for Contemporary Art, Sunderland, UK
- 2009 Magnetic Movie, Exploratorium, San Francisco, USA
- 2008 Magnetic Movie, Hirshhorn Museum, Smithsonian Institution, Washington, USA

== Selected group exhibitions ==
- 2019 Ecovisionaries, LABoral, Gijon, Spain
- 2019 Quantica: In Search of the Invisible, CCCB, Barcelona, Spain
- 2018 Superposition: Equilibrium and Engagement, 21st Biennale of Sydney, Australia
- 2018 Broken Symmetries, Fact, Liverpool, UK
- 2018 Nature as Data, Jing-an International Sculpture Park, Shanghai, China
- 2018 Groundwork, CAST, Cornwall, UK
- 2017 Infosphere, Centro National de las Artes (CENART), Mexico City, Mexico
- 2017 The Universe and Art, ArtScience Museum, Singapore
- 2017 No Such Thing as Gravity, National Taiwan Museum of Fine Arts, Taiwan
- 2016 Nonspaces, Akbank Sanat, Istanbul, Turkey
- 2016 The Universe and Art, Mori Art Museum, Tokyo, Japan
- 2016 Seeing Round Corners, Turner Contemporary, Margate, UK
- 2016 The Thinking Machine, Ramon Llull and the Ars combinatorial, CCCB, Barcelona, Spain
- 2016 Project Daejon: Cosmos, Daejon Museum of Art, South Korea
- 2016 Extra Fantôme, La Gaîté Lyrique, Paris, France
- 2015 Infosphere, ZKM, Museum of Contemporary Art, Karlsruhe, Germany
- 2015 Three Branches of the Same Tree, Pump House Gallery, London
- 2015 Animated Wonderworlds, Museum of Design, Zurich
- 2014 Da Vinci: Shaping the Future, ArtScience Museum, Singapore
- 2014 Jerwood Open Forest, Jerwood Space, London
- 2014 Vertigo, SIM Gallery, Curitiba, Brazil
- 2013 Galápagos, CAM, Lisbon
- 2013 Radical Fictions, 4th Exhibition of Digital Art, Instituto Tomie Ohtake, São Paulo, Brazil
- 2013 Space Odyssey 2.0, Z33 House for Contemporary Art, Hasselt, Belgium
- 2013 The Dark Universe, Sonic Acts Festival, New Arts Space, Amsterdam
- 2012 Field Conditions, San Francisco Museum of Modern Art, San Francisco, USA
- 2012 Digital Crystal: Swarovski at the Design Museum, Design Museum, London
- 2012 Is this Thing On?, Contemporary Art Center (CAC), Cincinnati, Ohio, USA
- 2012 Visualizing Sound, Laboral, Gijon, Spain
- 2012 Galapagos, The Fruitmarket Gallery, Edinburgh, UK
- 2011 Watch Me Move, Barbican, London, UK
- 2011 Wild Sky, Edith Russ Haus Fur Media Kunst, Oldenburg, Germany
- 2011 Invisible Fields, Arts Santa Monica, Barcelona
- 2011 Star Voyager: Exploring Space on Screen, Australian Centre for the Moving Image, Melbourne, Australia
- 2011 L'Objet Photographique, une Invention Permanente, Maison Europeenne de la Photographie, Paris, France
- 2010 Black Rain, RIXC Gallery, Riga, Latvia
- 2010 Into the Great Wide Open, Vlieland, Netherlands.
- 2009 Earth: Art of a changing world, Royal Academy of Arts, London, UK

== Selected group screenings ==
- 2017 The 24th Stuttgart Festival of Animated Film
- 2017 Rotterdam International Film Festival
- 2016 Hamburg International Short Film Festival, Germany
- 2015 Beyond the Single Screen, Tate Britain, London. (Semiconductor in conversation)
- 2014 Assembly: A Survey of Recent Artists’ Film and Video in Britain 2008–2013. Tate Britain, UK
- 2014 Carroll/ Fletcher On Screen in association with Animate Projects, UK
- 2013 Ann Arbor Film Festival, USA
- 2013 7th Recontres Internationales Sciences et Cinemas, Marseille, France
- 2013 London International Animation Festival, London, UK
- 2012 41st International Film Festival Rotterdam, Netherlands
- 2012 Animafest, Zagreb
- 2012 Curtas Vila Do Conde, Portugal
- 2012 Ottawa International Animation Festival, Canada
- 2012 New York Film Festival: Views from the Avant Garde, New York, USA
- 2012 Melbourne International Animation Festival, Australia
- 2012 European Media Art Festival, Osnabrueck, Germany
- 2012 San Francisco International Film Festival, USA
- 2011 11th Seoul International New Media Festival, Korea
- 2010 27th Kassel Documentary Film and Video Festival, Germany
- 2010 Venice Film Festival (Orizzonti section), Venice, Italy
- 2009 Sundance Film Festival, USA
- 2009 13th Media Art Biennale WRO 09, Wroclaw Poland
- 2009 Cannes Film Festival, British Council
- 2009 31st Clermont-Ferrand Short Film Festival, France
- 2008 Edinburgh Film Festival, Edinburgh, Scotland
- 2008 Los Angeles Film Festival, Los Angeles, USA
- 2008 Annecy International Animated Film Festival, Annecy, France
- 2008 British Animation Awards, London (Awarded Best Film at the Cutting Edge)

== Filmography/Works ==
1. Retropolis, 1999.
2. A-Z of Noise, 1999.
3. Yes You Are Right!, 1999.
4. Puffed Rice, 2000.
5. DAT Politics, music by DAT Politics, 2000.
6. Earthquake Films, 2000.
7. New Antics, 2000.
8. Whipaspank, music promo for Cristian Vogel, 2000.
9. QT, music promo for qqq, 2001.
10. Linear, 2001.
11. Domestic EMI, 2002.
12. Green Grass of Tunnel, music promo for Múm, 2002.
13. Strata, 2002.
14. Inaudible Cities: Part One, 2002.
15. Digital Anthrax, 2002.
16. Machi, music by Aco, 2003.
17. Mini-Epoch-Series, 2003.
18. The Sound of Microclimates, 2004.
19. "Sonic Inc." Live performance software, 2004.
20. All the Time in the World, 2005.
21. 200 Nanowebbers, music by Double Adaptor, 2005.
22. Ways of Making Sense, 2006.
23. Do You Think Science..., 2006.
24. Brilliant Noise, 2006.
25. Earthmoves, 2006.
26. Time Out of Place, 2007.
27. Magnetic Movie, 2007.
28. Matter in Motion, 2008.
29. Out of the Light, 2008.
30. Black Rain, 2009.
31. Heliocentric, 2009.
32. Indefatigable, 2010.
33. Crystallised, 2011.
34. Inferno Observatory, 2011.
35. Worlds in the Making, 2011.
36. 20 Hz, 2011.
37. The Shaping Grows, 2012.
38. Subterranean (Seismic Blues), 2012
39. Some Part of Us Will Have Become, 2012.
40. Data Projector, 2013.
41. Play of Light, 2014.
42. Cosmos, public sculpture, 2014.
43. Catching the Light, 2014.
44. Band 9, 2015.
45. Earthworks, 2016.
46. Where Shapes Come From, 2016.

== Other works ==
1. Sonic Inc., Live Performance.
2. Hi-Fi Rise – Sonic Cities from another Timeline, 2001 DVD self-released
3. Worlds in Flux, 2007 DVD Fat Cat records
