= Kaani =

Kaani may refer to:

- Kääni, a village in Nõo Parish, Tartu County, Estonia
- Kaani (film), a 2004 Indian Telugu film
- Kani tribe, a tribe in Kerala, India

== See also ==
- Kani (disambiguation)
- Kanni (disambiguation)
