= Other People's Problems =

Studio album by The Upper Room
- Released: 29 May 2006
- Recorded: 2004–2006
- Genre: Indie rock
- Length: 41:09
- Label: Sony BMG
- Producer: Paul Schroeder

Singles from Other People's Problems
- 1. "All Over This Town" Released: 2004 or 2005; 2. "Black and White" Released: 2006

Other People's Problems is the first and only album by The Upper Room. It was released in the United Kingdom on 29 May 2006.

The album art, an image of the United Kingdom made up of green dots, was based on a survey taken of O2 customers. The size of the green dots indicates the percentage of people who have a garden in each area, and the shade represents the percentage of seasonal affective disorder sufferers in each area.

The tracks "All Over This Town" and "Black and White" were released as singles. "All Over This Town" reached number 38 in the UK singles chart, and "Black and White" reached 22.

== Track listing ==
1. "All Over This Town" – 3:28
2. "Black and White" – 3:35
3. "Leave Me Alone" – 3:22
4. "Your Body" – 3:36
5. "Never Come Back" – 3:26
6. "Kill Kill Kill" – 3:03
7. "Portrait" – 3:04
8. "The Centre" – 3:14
9. "Once For Me" – 3:13
10. "Girl" – 3:56
11. "Combination" – 3:38
12. "It Began on Radio" – 3:34
