= Sylvain Chauveau =

- Born: 1971
- Origin: Bayonne, France
- Genres: Minimalism, Instrumental music, Electronic music, Ambient music
- Occupation(s): Musician, Composer
- Instrument(s): Voice, Guitar, Piano
- Labels: Sub Rosa, Type Records, Fat Cat Records, Flau, Les Disques du Soleil et de l'Acier, Sonic Pieces
- Website: http://www.sylvainchauveau.com/

Sylvain Chauveau (French pronunciation: [silvɛ̃ ʃovo]; born 1971) is an instrumental music and electronic music artist and composer from Bayonne, France. He is committed to the reduction of the ecological impact of the music field.

== Background ==
Sylvain Chauveau was born in Bayonne, France (1971), and currently lives partly in Anglet (France) and in Barcelona (Spain). He is a composer of minimalist music for acoustic instruments and electronics since 1998.

He has played live worldwide but since 2019 he travels by train and bicycle for ecological reasons.

He has released solo records on Sub Rosa, Fat Cat, Flau, Creative Sources, Nature Bliss, and Les Disques du Soleil et de l'Acier.

He has composed soundtracks for feature films, dance shows, and creates sound installations.

Sylvain Chauveau is also a member of Ensemble 0 (with Stéphane Garin, Joël Merah and many more).

== Solo discography ==
=== Albums ===
- "Le Livre noir du capitalisme" (Noise Museum, 2000, re-issue as "The Black Book of Capitalism", Type, 2008)
- "Nocturne impalpable" (DSA, 2001, re-issue Minority Records, 2014)
- "Un Autre Décembre" (130701/Fat Cat, re-issue Minority Records, 2015)
- "Des Plumes dans la tête" (DSA, 2004), original soundtrack (out of print)
- "Down to the bone" (DSA, 2005, re-issue Nature Bliss, 2007, re-issue Ici d'Ailleurs, 2015)
- "S." (Type, 2007)
- "Nuage (album)" (Type, 2007), original soundtrack
- "Touching Down Lightly" (Creative Sources, 2009)
- "Singular Forms (Sometimes Repeated)" (Type, 2010)
- "Abstractions" (Flau, 2012)
- "Simple (Rare and unreleased pieces 1998-2010)" (FatCat, 2012)
- "Kogetsudai" (Brocoli, 2013)
- "How To Live In Small Spaces" (Brocoli, 2015)
- "Post-Everything" (Brocoli, 2017)
- "Pianisme" (Sub Rosa, 2019)
- "Life Without Machines" (Flau, 2020)
- "L'effet rebond" (Sub Rosa, 2022)
- "ultra-minimal" (Sonic Pieces 2024)
- "Politique du Silence" (Minority Records, 2024)

=== Collaborations ===
- ensemble 0 (Stéphane Garin / Sylvain Chauveau / Joël Merah and more)
- Arca (Joan Cambon / Sylvain Chauveau)
