= Pimmon =

Australian electronic and ambient musician, record producer and arranger

Pimmon is the recording name of Australian electronic and ambient musician, record producer and arranger, Paul David Gough. He has released records on labels such as Fat Cat Records, Fällt, Tigerbeat6, Staalplaat and Staubgold, and collaborated with Keith Rowe and Oren Ambarchi, among others.

Gough started making music in the early 80s, inspired by Severed Heads, but never released any of it commercially. That changed when he sent a CD-R to the Japanese label Meme, who released it in 1999. Since then, Gough has been creating drone- and glitch-based abstract digital soundscapes, by manipulating a variety of sound sources on his computer. Gough's first documented output arrived in the very early stages of laptop Electroacoustic improvisation and he has thus been credited as "second only to Fennesz as a laptop artist." He has played live at various festivals around the world, and has toured several countries.

Gough lives in Adelaide, where he works as a radio producer at ABC Radio Adelaide. He is also the host of a podcast called 1234 and The Quiet Space and another program on FBi 94.5 called Paul's Play-Lunch. Gough also performs with guitarist Jeff Burch under the name Mandala Trap.

== Selected discography ==
- (1999) Pola-Pola (self-released)
- (1999) Waves and Particles (Meme)
- (1999) Copper Hats (Freedom From)
- (2000) Kinetica ((K-RAA-K)³)
- (2000) Assembler (Fällt)
- (2000) Afternoon Tea with Oren Ambarchi, Fennesz, Peter Rehberg, Keith Rowe (Ritornell)
- (2001) Electronic Tax Return (live EP, Tigerbeat6)
- (2001) Orquesta Del Arrurruz (Staalplaat)
- (2001) Secret Sleeping Birds (Sirr Records)
- (2002) Grain (by Samartzis; Pimmon; Verhagen; Brown) (Dorobo) Pimmon provides track 2: "Slegner Forgets".
- (2003) Mort Aux Vaches (Staalplaat)
- (August 2003) Snaps * Crackles * Pops (Tigerbeat6)
- (2005) Curse of Evil Clown (Meupe) (Meupe6)
- (2008) Curse You, Evil Clown (Meupe) (Meupe10)
- (2009) Smudge Another Yesterday (Preservation) (PRE021)
- (2009) Sounds of Perth (Cromim)
- (2009) Steered In Smash Ascent (Stunned Records)
- (2011) Lay Down Real Slow (Stunned Records)
- (2011) The Oansome Orbit (Room40)
