= The Upper Room (band) =

- Origin: Brighton, England
- Genres: Rock
- Years active: 2004–2006
- Label: Sony BMG
- Members: Alex Miller; Jim Pattinson; Beau Barnard; Jon Barnett

The Upper Room were a rock band based in Brighton, England. The band consisted of vocalist Alex Miller, guitarist James Pattinson, bassist Beau Barnard and drummer Jon Barnett.

== History ==
Sony Records were brought to the band's studio via mutual friends and they were signed in time for their first single, "All Over This Town", in summer 2004. "All Over This Town" was initially a limited release, but was re-released in March 2006 and reached number 38 in the Official Singles Chart. The band's second single, "Black and White", reached number 22 in the Official Singles Chart after receiving support from Newcastle United football club. The band's only album Other People's Problems was released in May 2006. It was recorded in Dairy Studios, Brixton, with Paul Schroeder, who previously worked with The Stone Roses.

Initially they toured the UK with Hope of the States, The Electric Soft Parade, Bell X1, Longview, El Presidente and Rooster amongst others. In 2006 they headlined a 15-date tour of the UK between 24 April and 19 May, and were also booked for the Isle of Wight and V Festivals.

Front man Alex Miller posted a MySpace bulletin on 15 November 2006 announcing the band's split. It read:

"...as there is quite a lot of misinformation going around at the moment, I am writing this message to clear up a few things. People have been guessing (and guessing wrongly) what the next move will be for the band and its members. I've had a great time over the last couple of years in The Upper Room and I will always remain good friends with Jim, Jon and Beau. However, after recently splitting from our record label I feel it is time for me to move on."

== Discography ==
=== Albums ===
- 2006: Other People's Problems – UK #50

=== Singles ===
Year	Song	UK Singles Chart	UK Download Chart	Album
2006	"All Over This Town"	38	–	Other People's Problems
2006	"Black and White"	22	48	Other People's Problems
