= His Clancyness =

- Origin: Bologna, Italy
- Genres: Indie rock, noise pop, art rock
- Years active: 2009–present
- Labels: FatCat Records; Secret Furry Hole; Splendour; Mirror Universe Tapes
- Members: Jonathan Clancy; Jacopo Borazzo; Giulia Mazza; Nico Pasquini
- Past members: Paul Pieretto; Emanuela Drei

His Clancyness is a Canadian Italian band based in Bologna, Italy formed in 2009 by Jonathan Clancy. Currently the band consists of Jonathan Clancy on guitar and vocals, Jacopo Borazzo on drums, Giulia Mazza on organ and synthesizers and Nico Pasquini on bass and sampler. His Clancyness is signed to Brighton-based independent label FatCat Records.

== Biography ==
His Clancyness' music has been described as 1970s New York art-punk and late-1980s US indie mixing elements of krautrock and psychedelic songwriting.

Tha band initially released two EP's in tape form, Hissometer Cassette and Always Mist. The latter garnered praise and buzz from online publications such as Pitchfork, Stereogum and Gorilla vs. Bear.

== Discography ==
- Hissometer (2009)
- Aways Mist (2010)
- Always Mist Revisited (2012)
- Vicious (FatCat) (2013)
- Isolation Culture (Maple Death Records) (2016)
