= Honeyblood =

Scottish indie rock solo project

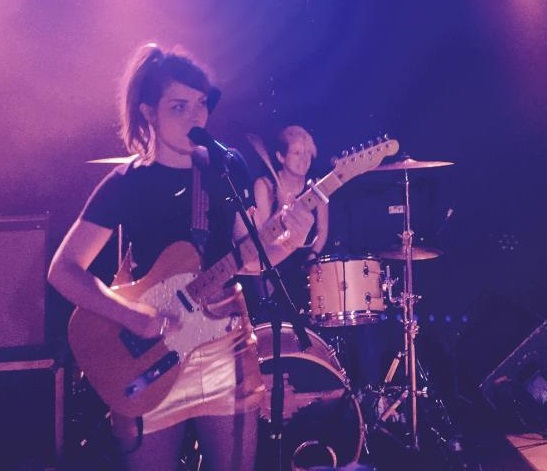
- Honeyblood performing at May 2015 Dot to Dot Festival

Background information
- Origin: Glasgow, Scotland
- Genres: Indie rock, lo-fi, garage rock, punk rock, noise rock
- Years active: 2012–present
- Labels: FatCat Records, Marathon Artists
- Members: Stina Tweeddale
- Past members: Shona McVicar; Cat Myers

Honeyblood is the Scottish indie rock solo project of guitarist and singer-songwriter Stina Tweeddale (born 23 November 1988). It was originally formed as a duo in Glasgow, Scotland, in 2012.

== History and formation ==
=== Formation and beginnings ===
Shona McVicar from Cumbernauld (drums/vocals) and Edinburgh-born Stina Marie Claire Tweeddale met when their previous bands (Partwindpartwolf and Boycotts, respectively) played the same gig in 2012. The name came from two places: the type of stage blood Tweeddale had used for a Halloween concert while performing with Boycotts, and as a reference to the lyrics of the song "Gutless" by Hole. Originally intending to recruit more band members, they decided to remain a duo.

Their first EP, Thrift Shop, was recorded in a bathroom on a four-track tape-deck, and included a cover of the Karen Peris song "The Girl on my Left". It was released in a limited run of fifty cassettes on the night of their first concert, at The Old Hairdressers in Glasgow, on 4 April 2012. The EP received a positive review in The Guardian.

They attracted the attention of FatCat Records head Alex Knight following their second concert, at Wide Days music conference in Edinburgh at Sneaky Pete’s on 12 April 2012, and he eventually signed them. During this period McVicar took a break to complete her dentistry degree, with replacement drummer Rah Morriss filling in until her visa expired, at which point McVicar rejoined the band.

=== Honeyblood (2014–2015) ===
In November 2013 the band recorded their self-titled debut album in Connecticut, US, with producer Peter Katis. The album was recorded in just ten days and released on FatCat Records on 8 July 2014. In September 2014 McVicar left the band to pursue other endeavours and was replaced by Cat Myers.

Honeyblood toured extensively in support of their debut album, supporting several acts including Foo Fighters, Palma Violets, Sleigh Bells, Deap Vally, Courtney Barnett, We Were Promised Jetpacks, and Superfood. They played showcases for the likes of The Skinny and Vice, and festivals including the Great Escape, Wide Days in Edinburgh, T in The Park and SXSW.

=== Babes Never Die (2016–2017) ===
In the winter of 2015, Tweeddale and Myers recorded their second album Babes Never Die at London's Fish Factory studio. Produced by James Dring, the album was released by Fat Cat on 4 November 2016 in the UK/EU and 28 October in the US. The band played Belladrum in 2017, televised on BBC Alba.

=== In Plain Sight (2018–present) ===
In 2019 Honeyblood signed with Marathon Artists, and announced an album would be available for pre-order on 7 February. With the announcement of their third studio album, In Plain Sight, and the release of lead single, "Third Degree", it was also announced that Honeyblood would move forward as a solo project, with Myers no longer part of the band. The album was longlisted for the 2020 Scottish Album of the Year.

== Discography ==
=== Albums ===
Title	Album details	Peak chart positions	
Title	Album details	SCO	UK
Honeyblood	Released: 8 July 2014; Label: Fat Cat	47	99
Babes Never Die	Released: 4 November 2016; Label: Fat Cat	16	50
In Plain Sight	Released: 24 May 2019; Label: Marathon Artists	14	73
"—" denotes album that did not chart or was not released

=== Singles ===
- "Thrift Shop" (2012, self-released)
- "Bud" (2013)
- "Killer Bangs" (2014)
- "Biro" (2014)
- "Super Rat" (2014)
- "Black Cloud"/"No Big Deal" (2015)
- "Ready for the Magic" (2016)
- "Sea Hearts" (2016)
- "Babes Never Die" (2017)
- "Walking at Midnight" (2017)
- "Swell Love" (2017)
- "The Third Degree" (2019)
- "Bubble Gun" (2019)
