= TRAAMS =

English indie rock band

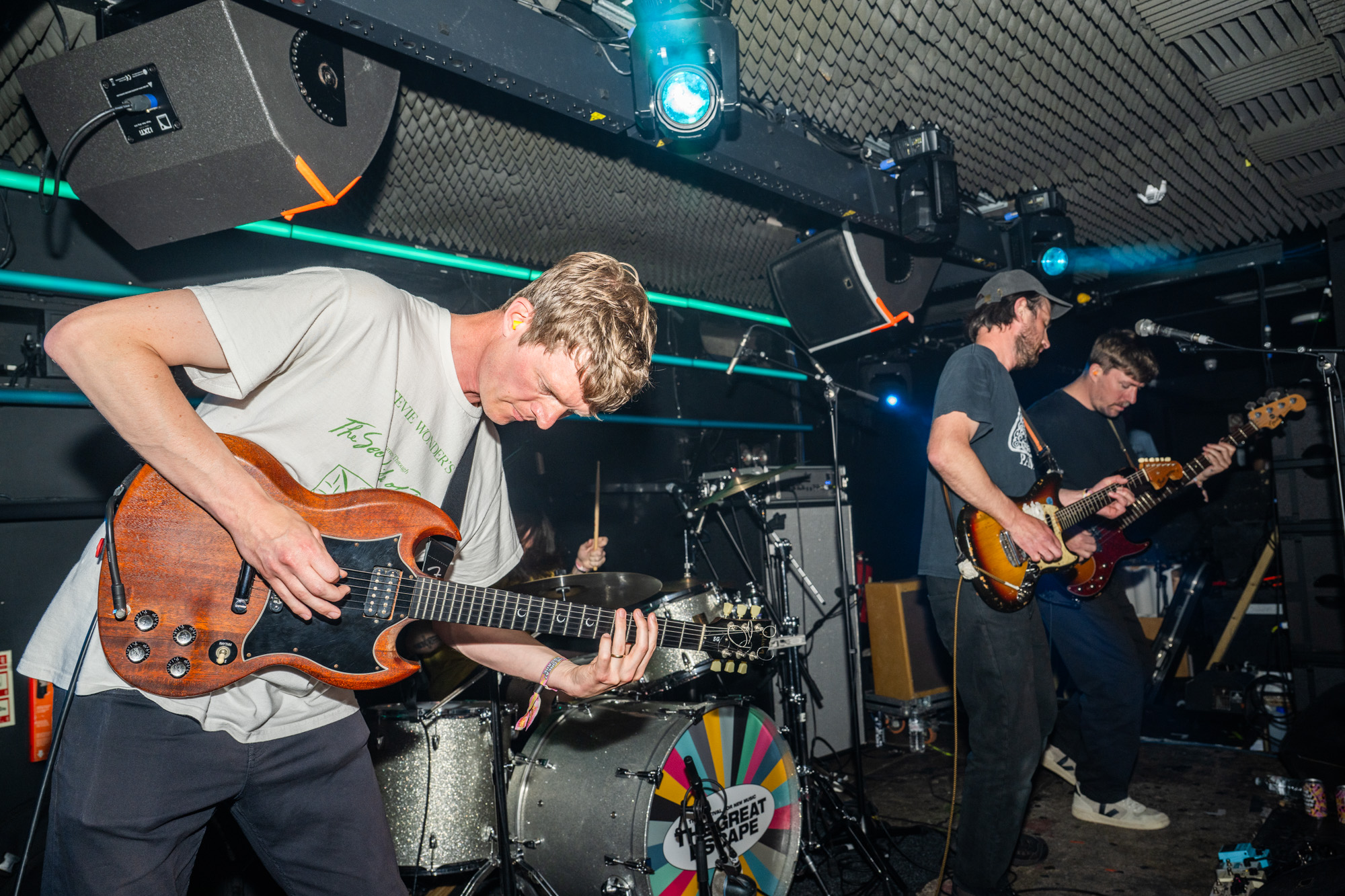
- TRAAMS at The Great Escape Festival in Brighton UK, 14 May 2025

Background information
- Origin: Chichester, West Sussex, England
- Genres: Indie rock; post-punk revival; krautrock (early)
- Years active: 2011–present
- Label: FatCat
- Members: Stuart Hopkins; Adam Stock; Leigh Padley
- Website: traams.tumblr.com

TRAAMS are an English indie rock band, formed in 2011 in Chichester, West Sussex, England.

== Background ==
The band's name "TRAAMS" comes from the acronym for "Time Reference Angle of Arrival Measurement System". The trio's roots originated in mid-2011 when the bandmembers met at Goo a club night based in Bognor Regis. There, Stuart Hopkins was a DJ where he spun songs by Wire, New Order, and Le Tigre along with mainstream pop and rap. The three bandmembers bonded over their mutual tastes of music, specifically musicians such as McLusky, Pavement, Television and Kraftwerk. The influences caused the band to begin jamming together and in late 2011, to begin recording music with each other. Much of the band's earliest demo work has been described as a hybrid of Krautrock and punk rock.

They sent the demos to producer and former Test Icicles member Rory Atwell, and recorded their first set of songs with him in November 2011. They continued working with him through 2012, and also signed with FatCat that year. Early in 2013, they recorded with Hookworms' Matthew Johnson at his Leeds studio and released their EP, Ladders that June. TRAAMS' first full-length studio album, Grin, was released 24 September 2013. The band reunited with Atwell for their next EP, Cissa, which arrived in July 2014.

TRAAMS worked with Johnson again on their second album, Modern Dancing, which was released on 20 November 2015. On 27 October 2016, the band released an eight minute track titled "A House On Fire".

Their latest album, Personal Best, was released on 22 July 2022.

== Discography ==
=== Studio albums ===
- Grin (2013)
- Modern Dancing (2015)
- Personal Best (2022)

=== EPs ===
- Ladders (2013)
- Cissa (2014)

=== Singles ===
- "Slipping" (2015)
- "A House on Fire" (2016)
- "Intercontinental Radio Waves" (2020)
- "The Greyhound" (2020)

== Members ==
- Stuart Hopkins — vocals, guitar
- Leigh Padley — guitar & bass
- Adam Stock — synths, drums
- John Davies — drums
- Liza Violet — synths & vocals

Touring members

- Daniel Daws — bass
