= Songs of Green Pheasant =

- Born: Duncan Richard Sumpner
- Origin: Wakefield, England
- Labels: FatCat Records, Rusted Rail

Songs of Green Pheasant is the solo project of Duncan Sumpner, a recording artist and school teacher from Heaton Mersey, Stockport, England. Blending acoustic-based songs with electronic effects, Sumpner's music has been described as "psychedelic folk" with "warm washes of sound".

In the mid-late 1990s Sumpner recorded a number of demos with fellow musician Oliver Bird that have remained unreleased. Over the preceding years the pair were reported to be working on finishing the tracks (an album's worth of songs) under the various names Redman Greenman, and Kill This Love, but to date only a fuzzy C90 cassette bears witness to the tracks. Titles include 'Eve of War', 'Wait Up', 'Soul', 'Bolt From The Blue', 'World of Glass', 'Let in Light', 'Dragons Eyes', 'Like a Bird', and 'It's Not Killing Me', among others.

== Discography ==
=== Albums ===
- Songs of Green Pheasant (FatCat Records, 2005)
- Aerial Days (FatCat Records, 2006)
- Gyllyng Street (FatCat Records, 2007)
- Soft Wounds (Rusted Rail, 2012)
- Mullock and Moil (Self Released, 2015)
- When the Weather Clears (Rusted Rail, 2020)
- Sings The Passing (Rusted Rail, 2025)
