= Party of One (band) =

American indie rock trio

Party of One is an indie rock trio from Minneapolis, Minnesota. They released their debut album, Caught the Blast, on May 27, 2003 on FatCat Records. They also released a single, "Shotgun Funeral", prior to this album, as well as another single, "Snap You Like a Twig", on April 20, 2004. The latter single was reviewed favorably by Shoo, a reviewer for Drowned in Sound, who compared it to the music of both Pavement and Ween. He also praised the single's B-side, "Star Sky Sierra", as being even better than the single itself. The band's members are lead vocalist, guitarist and songwriter Eric Fifteen (Eric Johnson), Geoff McCusick, and bassist Terrika Kleinknecht. Their music has been described as containing "typically confrontational, at times charmingly naïve messages", and as "punk only by historical association." Many critics have also described their music as negative and depressing. Julianne Shepherd has praised Fifteen's voice, which she compares to that of Sean Na Na, while Citypages has written that Fifteen "...models his political discontent with the ease of an immortal psychopath in a reusable bomb vest."

== Discography ==
- Dead Violet Shannon (FatCat, 2000)
- Caught the Blast (FatCat, 2003)
- Streetside Surprise (Go Johnny Go, 2014)

=== Singles ===
- Shotgun Funeral (FatCat, 2003)
- Snap You Like a Twig (FTC, 2004)
