= Ian William Craig =

Canadian musician

- Born: 1980 (age 45–46); Edmonton, Alberta, Canada
- Genres: Experimental

Ian William Craig (born 1980) is a Canadian musician known for using broken tape machines. He is based in Vancouver, British Columbia, Canada. Craig was classically trained in vocal performance and uses modified tape reels to distort his recorded voice. Music magazine Rolling Stone compared his style to that of William Basinski, Grouper, and Anohni. His 2016 Centres was the first release on FatCat's relaunched 130701 record label, which specializes in post-classical music and popularized the music of Max Richter and Hauschka. The album received "universal acclaim", according to album review aggregator Metacritic. Rolling Stone described Craig as the most exciting experimental composer of 2016.

== Discography ==
- A Turn of Breath (Recital, 2014)
- Cradle for the Wanting (Recital, 2015)
- Zugzwang For Fostex (Patient Sounds Intl., 2016)
- Meaning Turns to Whispers (Aguirre Records, 2016)
- Centres (130701, 2016)
- Slow Vessels (FatCat Records, 2017)
- Thresholder (Self released, 2018)
- Red Sun Through Smoke (FatCat Records, 2020)
- In a Word (with Daniel Lentz) (FRKWYS/RVNG International, 2022)
- Music for Magnesium_173 (2022)
