= Stórsveit Nix Noltes =

Icelandic band

- Origin: Reykjavík, Iceland
- Years active: 2004–2008
- Labels: Bubble Core Records, Kimi Records, 12 Tónar, Fat Cat Records
- Members: Áki Ásgeirsson; Eiríkur Orri Ólafsson; Ingi Garðar Erlendsson; Kristín Anna Valtýsdóttir; Kristín Þóra Haraldsdóttir; Hildur Ingveldard Guðnadóttir; Gestur Guðnason; Hallvarður Ásgeirsson; Guðmundur Steinn Gunnarsson; Páll Ivan frá Eiðum; Ólafur Björn Ólafsson

Stórsveit Nix Noltes are an Icelandic post-rock and Balkan folk band formed in 2004 and composed mostly of members of other Icelandic bands such as múm and Benni Hemm Hemm. Their first album, Orkideur Hawai was nominated as indie album of the year in the Icelandic Music Awards.

Their second album, Royal Family-Divorce, was released in 2007; it contains 10 Bulgarian folk tunes arranged by the band members themselves. By that time, band members were living in eight different cities. While this album was also well received, logistical difficulties resulted in the band performing less frequently than before; as one of their members, Kristín Anna Valtýsdóttir, noted in an interview in 2008, the 12 members lived in eight different cities. Their last appearance was in 2008.

== Discography ==
- Orkideur Hawai (March 21, 2006, Bubblecore)
- Royal Family - Divorce (May 5, 2009, FatCat Records/Rough Trade)
