= Amandine (band) =

Swedish musical group

Amandine are a band from Sweden consisting of Olof Gidlöf (vocals), John Andersson (piano/accordion), Andreas "Bosse" Hedström (bass), Andreas Bergqvist (drums) and Kristina Lundin (violin).

== Background ==
Amandine were originally known as Wichita Linemen, formed in 2001. The original lineup of the Wichita Linemen was Olof Gidlöf (vocals), Andreas Wengelin (bass), John Andersson (piano/accordion) and Dan-Erik Westerlind (drums), but several personal difficulties meant that Andreas and Dan could not continue with the band. Hedström and Berggvist, already friends of the band, quickly filled the empty positions, and the new lineup released a demo, 'Halo', in January 2004 with producer Ove Andersson.

They are currently signed to Fat Cat Records.

== Discography ==
- Halo 7inch (CDM) (2005)
- This is Where Our Hearts Collide (2005)
- Leave Out the Sad Parts (EP) (2006)
- Waiting for the Light to Find Us (EP) (2006)
- Solace in Sore Hands (2007)
- Silence of a Falling Star (single) (2008)
- Amandine (2012)
