= Welcome (band) =

Welcome was a band from Seattle.

== Discography ==
- Sirs (LP, Fat Cat Records, 2006)
- Sun as Night Light (LP, RX Remedy, 1999)
- The Expensive Sounds of... (EP, RX Remedy, 1996)
- Glue B/W Low Cost Solution (7", RX Remedy, 1995)
- Split with Mars Accelerator (7", Corn!, 1995)
