= The Midnight Sun (C Duncan album) =

Studio album by C Duncan
- Released: 4 October 2016
- Genre: Baroque pop; dream pop
- Length: 43:04
- Label: FatCat
- Producer: C Duncan

C Duncan chronology
Architect (2015)	The Midnight Sun (2016)	Health (2019)

Singles from The Midnight Sun
- 1. "Wanted to Want It Too" Released: 3 August 2016; 2. "Other Side" Released: 2 December 2016; 3. "Like You Do" Released: 30 March 2017

The Midnight Sun is the second studio album of Scottish composer and dream pop musician Christopher Duncan, known by his moniker C Duncan. While recorded by Duncan in the same bedroom studio as his previous album, Architect (2015), as well as having the same baroque pop sound, The Midnight Sun has a more polished sound due to Duncan upgrading his studio, contains more electronic music elements, is more consistent stylistically, and has a darker tone and atmosphere inspired by Rod Serling's television The Twilight Zone. Released in October 2016 by FatCat Records, it landed at number 28 on the Scottish Albums Chart, was well received by critics and was a shortlist nominee for the Scottish Album of the Year Award.

== Production ==
Duncan said that shortly after the release of his first album Architect (2015), he wanted to finish a second album quickly simply to keep busy with tours: "I thought I might as well just get the ideas down for the second album when they came, instead of wasting time for the sake of it." Like Architect, The Midnight Sun was written and produced by Duncan in his Glasgow bedroom studio. Due to his experience learning recording equipment with Architect, which took more than a year to finish, Duncan was able to complete The Midnight Sun in only three months.

Duncan initially planned for his second record to be a Burt Bacharach-esque easy listening album, where he used a more professional studio and hired a string quartet. However, in the end, he decided to record in the same studio as the one used for Architect at the same low budget: "I got so used to having really limited access to things. So I wanted to do that for the second album, but without it sounding [the same]."

The Midnight Sun has a more polished sound due to Duncan upgrading the equipment he used after completing Architect. He upgraded his MacBook, the audio interface he used, where he went from a TASCAM US-122 he used for ten years to Focusrite's Clarett 2Pre interface, and the monitor he mixed on, going from RHA headphones to KRK VXT4 monitors. He received both the Clarett 2Pre and the KRK VXT4 monitors via a deal Focusrite made with Duncan to appear in one of the company's promotional videos.

"Do I Hear" was originally composed as a classical piece he composed for soprano voice in 2014 before he arranged and recorded it in the style of The Midnight Sun.

== Music ==
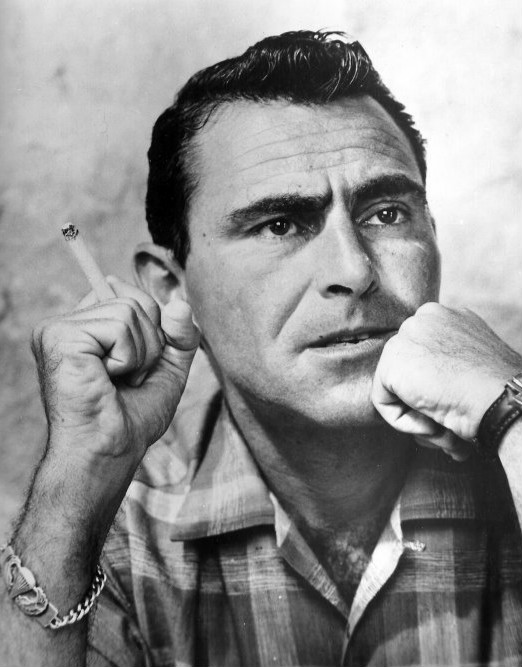
Rod Serling's television series The Twilight Zone influenced The Midnight Sun.

As with Architect, The Midnight Sun is a dreamlike baroque pop record with many moments of layers of Duncan's voice executing harmonies. However, The Midnight Sun has a more polished sound due to Duncan upgrading the studio after completing Architect, is more electronic as it incorporates more synthesizers, includes more tinges of contemporary jazz, and features more complex percussion. Duncan claimed he put hidden compositional references to other songs on The Midnight Sun: the pitch of "The Last to Leave"'s melody follows the direction of "Edelweiss," a show tune from The Sound of Music, and Duncan used elements of the melodies in William Walton's piece Belshazzar's Feast for the songs "Who Lost" and "Jupiter." Juan Edgardo Rodriguez of PopMatters called the album more pop-oriented than Architect, which he compared to Kevin Parker's direction into pop on his Tame Impala album Currents (2015), and noted that Duncan plays around with elements of pop on the album.

The Midnight Sun was inspired by the atmosphere and format of Rod Serling's television The Twilight Zone, which is why the album is titled after the tenth episode of the show's third season. The Twilight Zone inspired Duncan to make an "anthology series styled album" where, despite each song being different conceptually, the atmospheres and styles of each songs connect together, creating a cohesive listen. This departed from his previous album Architect (2015), which mixed together elements from a bunch of genres and, to Duncan, felt like a "collection of songs" rather than an actual LP. In terms of tone, The Midnight Sun is also more ominous than Architect. The place Duncan was living in while he made the album was Glasgow, where during the summer, nighttime lasts for only three to four hours. This had a "claustrophobic, mysterious and unnerving" effect on his mental state that he related to the tone of The Twilight Zone, so he incorporated that into The Midnight Sun.

== Lyrics ==
The Midnight Sun's dark character is further enforced by its lyrics, which deal with relationship issues, depression, and other situations Duncan went through. "Like You Do" is a song about a depression that one of Duncan's friends was suffering from while he recorded the album. The themes of "Other Side" were influenced by his desire to be outside of his hometown as a result of enjoying his experience touring other nations. "Who Lost" is a song about other people in someone's life making his rivalry between him and a sibling pointless. It is based on Duncan's childhood experiences with his brother. "Last to Leave" is, according to Duncan, a map of a failed relationship he had with a former partner. Duncan said "Do I Hear" is about getting into someone else's lifestyle while "being yourself and coping with and embracing your quirks, sexuality, and character." "Jupiter," in Duncan's word, is a "romanticised" version of a "strange" experience he had in a gay boat party he went to after performing in Hamburg in 2015; he called it "a euphoric song, yet slimy and unnerving." The LP closes with "Window," a realization that someone feels better once he's figured out his problems.

== Artwork ==
Duncan painted the cover art for The Midnight Sun in between making each track. The artwork is a painting of a stairwell in his flat, and he spent "fifteen times a day" viewing the stairwell he was painting. According to him, "it was all about what interested me whilst making and recording music myself."

== Promotion ==
The lead single of The Midnight Sun was "Wanted To Want It Too," issued on 3 August 2016. On 2 September 2016, The 405 premiered the video for the song which was directed by Helen Plumb. It depicts a masked "heart stealer" that symbolically represents the emotions a person has when they got out into the night. Plumb also directed the videos for "Other Side" and "Like You Do." The single for "Other Side" was issued on 2 December 2016, and its video was released on 12 December 2016. The video stars artist Rondi Park as a woman who puts on various dresses to escape reality. "Like You Do" was released as a single on 17 March 2017, with "Nothing at All" as its B-side, and Nothing but Hope and Passion premiered the video for it on 30 March 2017. The video consists of "simple" footage of Duncan being distorted. On 11 October 2016, PopMatters premiered a video of a live performance of "Do I Hear" by Duncan and his backing band at the Cottiers venue in Glasgow, filmed by Plumb and Ben Cox.

== Reception ==
Professional ratings
Aggregate scores
Source	Rating
Album of the Year	80/100
AnyDecentMusic?	8/10
Metacritic	81/100
Review scores
Source	Rating
AllMusic	3.5/5 stars
DIY	4/5 stars
Financial Times	4/5 stars
God is in the TV	10/10
The Guardian	4/5 stars
musicOMH	4/5 stars
PopMatters	7/10 stars
The Skinny	4/5 stars
Uncut	9/10
Under the Radar	6.5/10 stars

The Midnight Sun was generally praised by critics, numerous reviewers spotlighting the album's huge detail in the sound design and composition. A ten-out-of-ten review of The Midnight Sun from the webzine God is in the TV highlighted the album's "emotional core," where its mysterious tone is "led by the soul’s need for resolution," claiming, "what makes The Midnight Sun so utterly compelling is its spontaneous nature and unmatched beauty, which is in many ways much like life-itself." AllMusic praised The Midnight Sun for having "significantly bolder strokes" than Architect and that it "rewards a patient ear and an open heart," and Gigsoup praised the album's "transcendence of genre." The Quietus claimed, "[Duncan] writes melodies you feel you’ve always known, harmonies that satisfy your ears and cadences that strike with and at your heart. If anything, this album is better than his first, as he settles confidently on his recognisable but versatile sound."

musicOMH praised the LP for being "carefully and painstakingly thought out" like Architect while making this task sound "effortless," and Rodríguez wrote that it has "an asset that allows [Duncan] to interlace all kinds of sonic and tangible elements without dismissing his prominent folk leanings." The Guardian claimed The Midnight Sun had "a spirituality that, in a year of bold musical statements and political upheaval, provides a soothing tonic; an escapist episode of spectacular beauty." A mixed review by Billy Hamilton of Under the Radar found the tracks to only be "subtle variations of the same song," opining the album was mostly "lush and immersive" and little else. The 405 Robert Whitfield criticized the LP's atmospheric elements for getting in the way of the lyrics and vocals: "C Duncan’s vocals are often buried under so many layers that what message or meaning he wishes to communicate is lost. Ultimately it means that The Midnight Sun is more of an atmospheric experience, than an emotive one."

The Midnight Sun made it to the shortlist of the 2017 Scottish Album of the Year Award, an annual award that honors records made by Scottish artists, but lost to the LP Strike a Match (2016) by the rock band Sacred Paws. In terms of year-end lists from publications, the album was number 36 on a list of the best albums by Under the Radar and number 7 on God is in the TV's list.

== Track listing ==
Track lengths derived from the iTunes Store.

No.	Title	Length
1.	"Nothing More"	3:55
2.	"Like You Do"	4:40
3.	"Other Side"	3:15
4.	"Wanted to Want It Too"	3:57
5.	"Who Lost"	3:35
6.	"On Course"	3:37
7.	"Last to Leave"	3:29
8.	"Do I Hear?"	4:04
9.	"The Midnight Sun"	4:16
10.	"Jupiter"	4:20
11.	"Window"	3:46
Total length:		43:04

== Release history ==
Region	Date	Format(s)	Label
Worldwide	4 October 2016	Streaming	DIY
Europe; Oceania; Asia	7 October 2016	CD; digital download; vinyl	FatCat
North America	14 October 2016	CD; digital download; vinyl	FatCat

== Charts ==
Chart (2016)	Peak position
Scottish Albums (OCC)	28
UK Independent Album Breakers (OCC)	4
UK Physical Albums (OCC)	62
UK Record Store Chart (OCC)	9
