= Felte Records =

- Founded: 2012
- Founder: Jeff Owens
- Status: Active
- Genre: Post-punk, shoegaze, dream pop, dark electronic
- Country of origin: United States
- Location: Los Angeles, California
- Official website: www.felte.net

felte (stylized in all lowercase) is an American independent record label based in Los Angeles, California. Founded in 2012 by Jeff Owens, known for its curation of the post-punk revival and darkwave genres the label has gained a reputation for its focus on atmospheric and "moody" genres, including post-punk, shoegaze, and industrial music.

== History ==
felte was established in 2012 in New York City before relocating to Los Angeles. Founder Jeff Owens began the imprint following several years in the music industry, having held positions at The Leaf Label, Mute Records, and Ghostly International. The label was conceived as a platform for artists who prioritized sonic "mood" and texture over specific genre conventions. Owens has cited the DIY ethos and aesthetic consistency of labels like 4AD, Factory Records, and Touch and Go Records as primary influences on felte's operational model.The label's early catalog featured breakthrough releases from artists such as Flaamingos and Ritual Howls, establishing a "dark" but melodic identity that became a signature of the brand. In the years following its move to Los Angeles, felte became a significant contributor to the Southern California independent music scene, often showcasing talent at festivals like SXSW and local experimental venues.

== Critical reception ==
The label has received consistent coverage from the independent music press. Publications such as Stereogum, NPR Music, and Post-Punk.com have highlighted felte for its curation of the modern post-punk revival. Post-Punk.com noted the label's ability to scout artists that evoke "dark energies" and "cinematic recesses," specifically praising the longevity of the Detroit-based group Ritual Howls.In 2020, the label received critical acclaim for the release of Ganser's Just Look at That Sky, which was named one of the year's best albums by several outlets, including The A.V. Club and Stereogum. Journalists have frequently remarked on the label's visual consistency, which features minimalist and stark art direction provided by Philistine DSGN.

felte artists have received air play on BBC Radio 6 Music. Most notably, the 2025 debut Warsaw 480km by pôt-pot was named one of the station's Albums of the Year, selected specifically by presenter Deb Grant.

== See also ==
List of independent record labels, Music of Los Angeles
