= C Duncan =

Scottish composer and musician

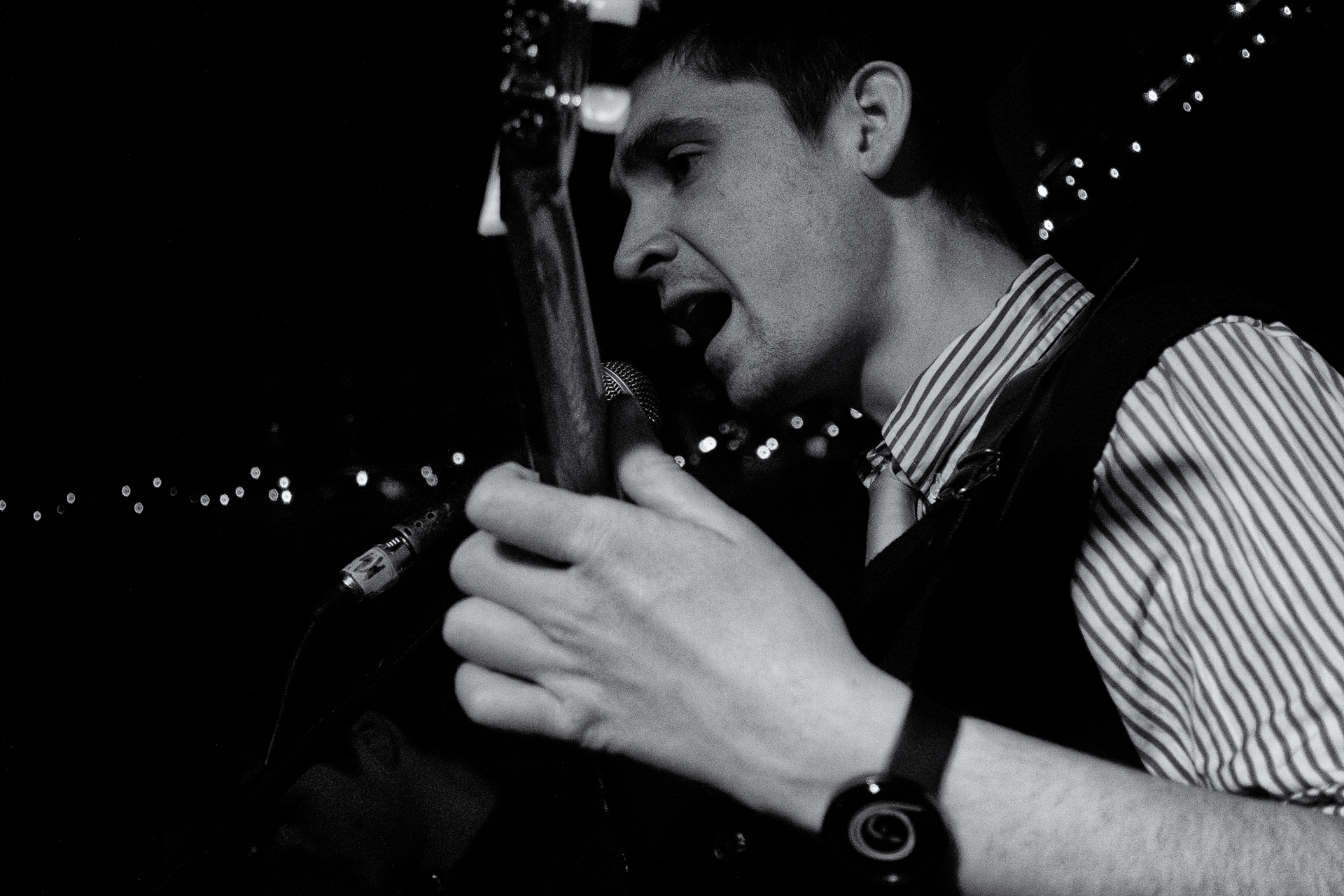
- C Duncan Lock Tavern at a Festival 2015

Background information
- Birth name: Christopher Duncan
- Born: 29 July 1989 (age 36)
- Origin: Glasgow, Scotland
- Genres: Indie pop, indie folk, dream pop
- Instrument(s): Keyboards, guitar, vocals
- Years active: 2012–present
- Labels: Bella Union
- Website: www.cspaceduncan.com

Christopher Duncan (born 29 July 1989) is a Scottish composer and musician. His compositions have been featured on various television programmes, including Waterloo Road, and have been performed by Icebreaker and the Sirens of Titan choir. His first solo single, "For", was released in December 2014. He is currently signed to Bella Union.

His debut album Architect was nominated for the 2015 Mercury Music Prize. In October 2016, he released his second album The Midnight Sun. On 18 January 2019 Duncan announced his third album, Health, would be released on 29 March 2019. On the same day, he released the first single from Health, "Impossible". Health was produced by Elbow's Craig Potter at Blueprint Studios at Salford, Manchester, and will be Duncan's first album he did not record and produce entirely by himself. The album was shortlisted for the Scottish Album of the Year Award 2019.

== Life and career ==
Duncan's parents are both classical musicians. He initially took up piano and viola as instruments, but playing with bands in his teenage years, he also learned to play guitar, bass and drums. He enrolled in Royal Scottish Academy of Music and Drama (now the Royal Conservatoire of Scotland) to study music composition. His pieces were performed by various ensembles across the UK.

Duncan's solo music takes in both classical and modern music and has been described as combining lush choral harmonies and acoustic instrumentation, textured like contemporary dreampop, and a cross of lo-fi folk with the harmonic width of choral composition. He has toured extensively with his band to support both his albums. Duncan is also an artist and has painted the pictures used as covers for his solo releases.

Duncan is gay and wishes to use his platform as a recording artist to champion LGBT causes. In a 2016 interview with The Seventh Hex, he said, "I hope my music reaches as many people as possible. It might sound cheesy, but I honestly want to use my music to help others. For instance, I’m gay and growing up I didn’t have many gay alternative role models, so I’d like to help out in that way too." In a 2019 interview with Scottish broadsheet newspaper The Herald while promoting his new album Health, he explained to writer Martin Williams that his coming out was difficult intellectually to him and he is eager to contribute his point of view to the alternative music community: "It is still a funny thing to have to do (come out to family and friends) because of the years of nerves before you do it. Before that you try to be something you are not. You kind of have a switch that goes on and off, certainly for me, but I now know exactly who I am...Gay alternative musicians are not that common, so I hope I can add to the group that are already there."

== Discography ==
=== Albums ===
Title	Details	Peak chart positions			
Title	Details	SCO	BE (Wa)	NL	UK Indie
Architect	Release: 16 July 2015; Label: FatCat Records; Format: Digital download, CD, LP	52	154	99	7
The Midnight Sun	Release: 7 October 2016; Label: FatCat Records; Format: Digital download, CD, LP	28	-	-	9
Health	Release: 29 March 2019; Label: FatCat Records; Format: Digital download, CD, LP				21
Alluvium	Release: 6 May 2022; Label: Bella Union; Format: Digital download, CD, LP				
It's Only A Love Song	Release: 24 January 2025; Label: Bella Union; Format: Digital download, CD, LP				

=== Singles ===
Year	Title	Album
2014	"For"	Architect
2015	"Say"	Architect
2015	"Garden"	Architect
2015	"Here to There"	Architect
2015	"For"^{[A]} (Autumn Rebuild)	Architect
2016	"Wanted to Want It Too"	The Midnight Sun
2016	"On Course"	The Midnight Sun
2016	"Other Side"	The Midnight Sun
2017	"Like You Do"	The Midnight Sun
2019	"Impossible"	Health
2019	"Health"	Health

== Notes ==
A The autumn rebuild version of "For" is included on the expanded edition of the album Architect.
