= Janek Schaefer =

Janek Schaefer (born 1970) is a British avant-garde artist, musician, composer, inventor, and entertainer, known for performing and exhibiting his work around the world with sound and installation art. Schaefer has released 40 albums, runs Lucky Dip Disco, and his own label, audiOh! Recordings.

== Life and career ==
Schaefer was born in England to Polish and Canadian parents.

While studying architecture at the Royal College of Art (RCA) with tutor Ben Kelly, Schaefer recorded the stop start noises of a sound-activated dictaphone travelling overnight through the Post Office. The resulting work, "Recorded Delivery" was made for the 'Self Storage' exhibition Time Out critics choice with former postman Brian Eno, Laurie Anderson, and Artangel.

After graduating from the RCA with the annual portfolio prize, Schaefer invented the Tri-phonic Turntable in 1997, to create new music from discarded media, and began performing and touring live. The turntable is listed in the Guinness Book of Records as the "World's Most Versatile Record Player". Schaefer has performed, lectured, and exhibited in 30 countries throughout Europe (Sonar, Tate Modern, ICA), USA & Canada (The Walker, XI, Mutek, FIMAV, Princeton), and toured across Japan and Australia including a performance at the Sydney Opera House in 2003.

His debut reverse play LP "His Masters Voices" was released in 1997 on his audiOh! Recordings label. His first studio CD Above Buildings (2000) was released on Fat Cat and was CD of the week in The Guardian. He created the original random playing LP called 'Skate' in 2004, which evolved into an audio visual installation, which won Award of Distinction at Ars Electronica in Austria 2004

Schaefer has collaborated on albums with Philip Jeck (Songs for Europe), Robert Hampson (Comae), Stephan Mathieu (Hidden Name), Charlemagne Palestine (Day of the Demons), and William Basinski (... on reflection).

Schaefer is a visiting professor in sound art, and PhD external examiner.

In 2008, using prize money from the Paul Hamlyn Award, he set up the Lucky Dip Disco. An all ages disco turning around the box of 7"s to invite the audience to search for their favourite music memories. In 2020 he won the 'Best Mobile DJ' National UK Award.

In 2009, the Bluecoat gallery in Liverpool mounted a five gallery retrospective exhibition of his career to date.

He lives and works at 'Narnia' in Walton-on-Thames with two children.

== Awards ==
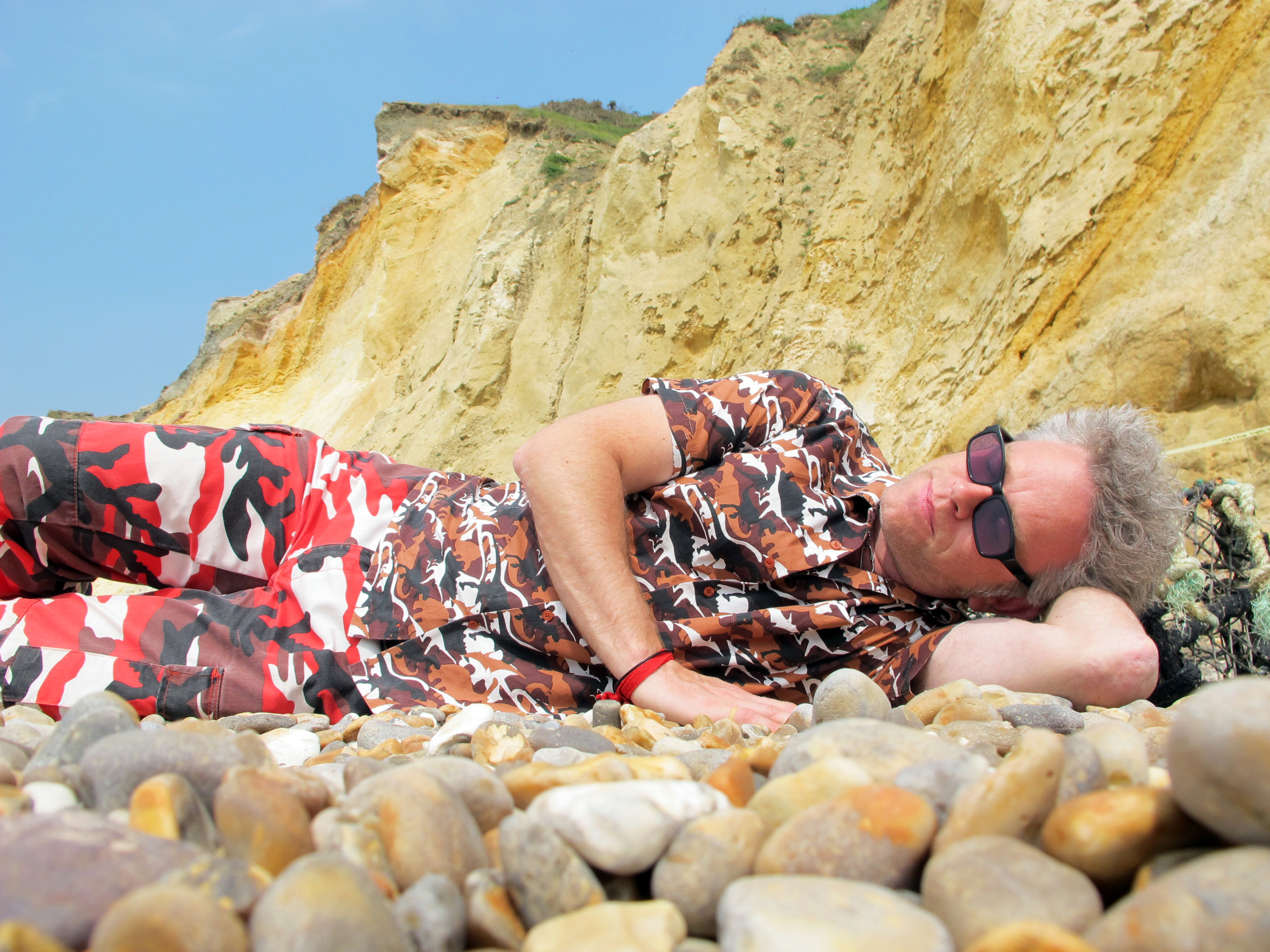
Schaefer on the beach, 2016

- 1991: Royal Institute of British Architects, Photography Prize for ‘Neighbours’.
- 1996: Royal College of Art Old Student Award portfolio prize.
- 2002: McKnight Composer in Residence, American Composers Forum
- 2004: Award of Distinction at Prix Ars Electronica, Austria, for random playing LP Skate
- 2008: British Composer of the Year in Sonic Art Award, for "Extended Play" (triptych for the child survivors of war and conflict).
- 2008: Paul Hamlyn Award for Composers prize.
- 2020: UK 'Best Mobile DJ' Award at the Event Entertainment Awards
