= FatCat Records =

English independent record label

- Founded: 1997
- Founder: David Cawley; Alexander Knight
- Status: Active
- Genre: Indie rock; avant-garde; electronic; folk
- Country of origin: UK
- Location: Brighton, Sussex, England; Brooklyn, New York, U.S
- Official website: www.fatcat.online

FatCat Records is an English independent record label based in Brighton. The label's output reaches into many styles including experimental rock, electronica, psychedelic folk, contemporary classical, noise and post-punk. Notable artists that have released music on the label include Sigur Rós, Múm, Animal Collective, Frightened Rabbit, Shopping, the Twilight Sad, Vashti Bunyan and We Were Promised Jetpacks.

== History ==
=== 1989–2001 ===
FatCat originally began in 1989 as a record store in Crawley, West Sussex, formed by Alex Knight, Dave Cawley and Andy Martin. It moved to central London in 1990, and originally specialised in Detroit and Chicago-based techno and house music. The store closed down in 1997, and the record label was born in its place, initially releasing dance and electronic 12"s. The label moved to Brighton in 2001.

=== 2000s ===
As well as Sigur Rós, another Icelandic band, Múm, were signed and proved successful for the label. The same year also saw the establishment of the 130701 imprint for the Set Fire to Flames album Sings Reign Rebuilder. A home for "post-classical" music, the imprint was later appended with the signing of pianist/composers Sylvain Chauveau, Max Richter and Hauschka. In the same period FatCat consolidated its roster with the inclusion of artists like David Grubbs, Giddy Motors, and Party of One.

The departure of Sigur Rós to EMI in late 2004 lead to the label going back to being entirely independent. In 2005, FatCat expanded its setup with the establishment of a US office in New York, and with the FatCat Publishing arm. That same year saw the release of Vashti Bunyan's Lookaftering album. Besides picking up European licenses in Vetiver and Blood on the Wall, the label also signed singer-songwriter Nina Nastasia, as well as new acts like Tom Brosseau, David Karsten Daniels, No Age, the Rank Deluxe, and Songs of Green Pheasant around this time. In 2007, FatCat put out the first FatCat DVD release by audiovisual artists Semiconductor, who had previously worked on videos for Múm and QT?, as well as taking part in a number of FatCat showcases.

=== 2010s ===
In 2012, the project of Meghan Remy, U.S. Girls, released her FatCat debut LP Gem and later signed to 4AD to release her second album, Half Free.

2013 saw TRAAMS release their debut FatCat release. In the same year TRAAMS released their debut LP Grin and their follow-up LP Modern Dancing was released in 2015.

In 2014 the Twilight Sad released their fourth studio album, Nobody Wants to Be Here and Nobody Wants to Leave, to critical acclaim and a 10/10 review from Drowned in Sound. In 2015, Scottish composer and musician C Duncan released his debut album, Architect, which was later nominated for the Mercury Prize.

In 2016, FatCat signed Tall Ships. Numerous complications after the release of their debut album caused a three-year hiatus. The band returned with their second album, Impressions, in 2017 and marked a move away from a math rock sound and towards a more alternative rock sound. Also in 2016, Honeyblood released their second album, Babes Never Die, and C Duncan also released his second album, The Midnight Sun, both to critical acclaim.

Also in 2016, FatCat sublabel 130701 released albums by a new roster of artists, including Resina, Ian William Craig and Dmitry Evgrafov. Ian William Craig's album Centres was released to critical acclaim and placements on numerous critics' end-of-year lists, including Mojo, The New York Times and Rolling Stone. In 2017, 130701 released Fiction/Non Fiction, the debut album from Montreal-based composer Olivier Alary.

== Series and sublabels ==
FatCat has several 'series' they release music across: Splinter Series, Split Series, 8” Series, and E-RMX, amongst others. They also have a sublabel called 130701, which was set up to release more orchestrated and instrumental material.

== Artists ==
=== Current roster of artists ===
- Abdomen
- Ava Rasti
- Breton
- Clarice Jensen
- Dead Gaze
- Den Der Hale
- Dmitry Evgrafov
- Dobrawa Czocher
- Dustin O’Halloran
- Emil Friis
- Forest Fire
- His Clancyness
- Ian William Craig
- Johannes Malfatti
- Knightstown
- Maps & Atlases
- Mazes
- Mice Parade
- Milk Maid
- Nina Nastasia
- Olivier Alary
- Paws
- Resina
- Samana
- Shopping
- Tal National
- Tall Ships
- The Twilight Sad
- TRAAMS
- Vashti Bunyan
- We Were Promised Jetpacks

=== Alumni ===
- Amandine
- Animal Collective
- Aoki Takamasa + Tujiko Noriko
- The Balky Mule
- Björk mit Funkstörung
- Black Dice
- Blood on the Wall
- Brakes
- C Duncan
- Charlottefield
- Chib
- Crescent
- David Grubbs
- David Karsten Daniels
- Di Lacuna
- Dorine Muraille
- Dr. Smith & Professor Ludlow
- Drowsy
- Ensemble
- Foehn
- Fonn
- Frightened Rabbit
- Get Back Guinozzi!
- Giddy Motors
- Grain
- Gregory and the Hawk
- Grindverk
- Hauschka
- HiM
- Hondo Straight
- Immense
- Insync v Mysteron
- Janek Schaefer
- Jóhann Jóhannsson
- Kemialliset Ystävät
- Live Human
- Max Richter
- Múm
- MNNQNS
- No Age
- Panda Bear
- Party of One
- Pimmon
- Process
- Programme
- Psychedelic Horseshit
- Odonis Odonis
- Olivier Alary Ensemble
- Our Brother the Native
- Semiconductor
- Set Fire to Flames
- Sigur Rós
- Silje Nes
- Songs of Green Pheasant
- Sons of the Sun
- Storsveit Nix Noltes
- Stromba
- Sunroof!
- Sylvain Chauveau
- Ten Kens
- Tom Brosseau
- The Balky Mule
- The Bug
- The Dylan Group
- The Rank Deluxe
- The Realistics
- The Twilight Sad
- To Rococo Rot
- Transient Waves
- Ultra-red
- Vetiver
- Web
- Welcome
- Xinlisupreme

== See also ==
- List of record labels
