= God's Money =

God's Money may refer to

- God's Money (album), a 2005 album by Gang Gang Dance
- God's Money (film), a 1959 Argentine film
