= Sian Alice Group =

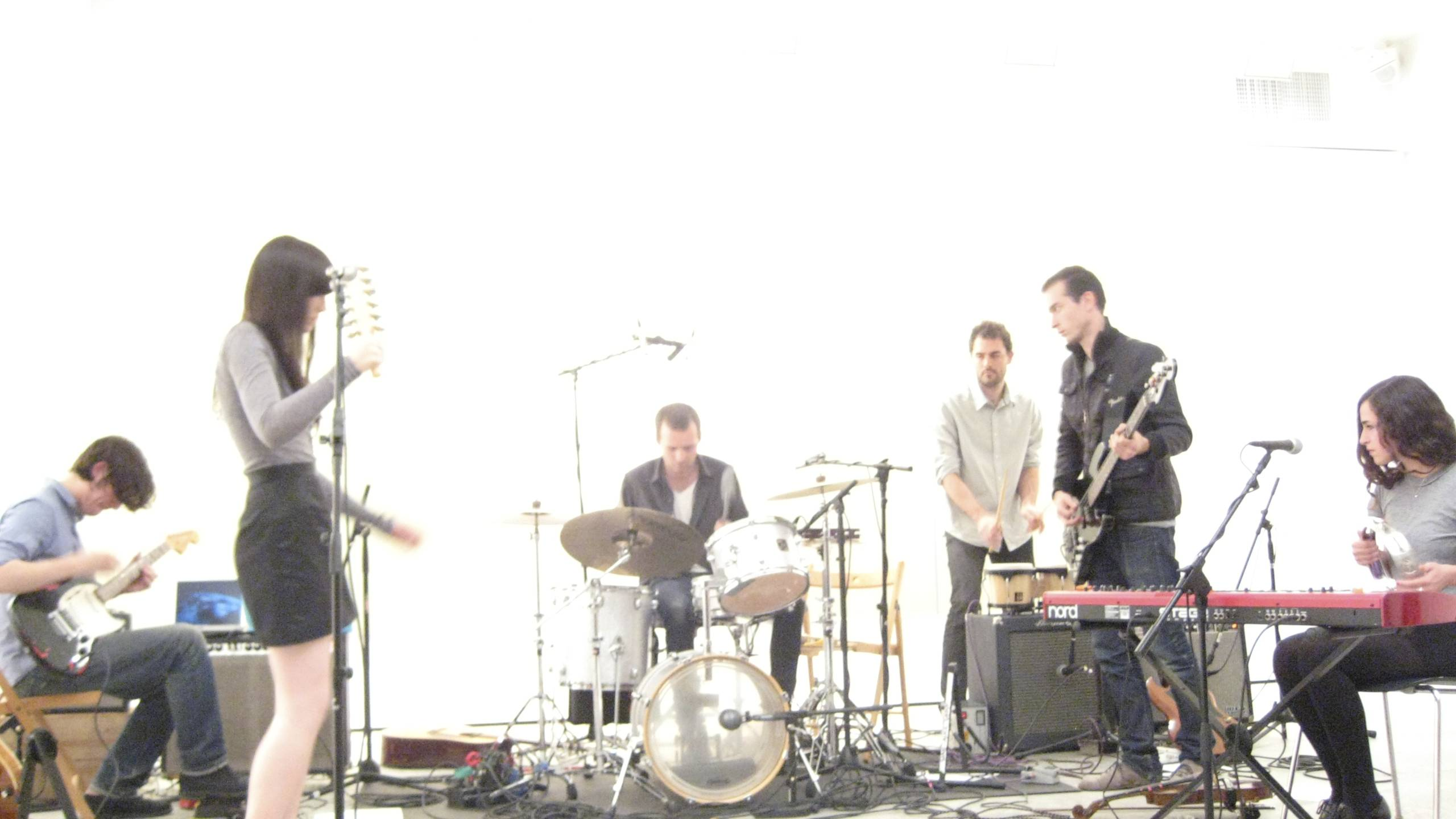
- Sian Alice Group performing at The Gary Snyder Project Space, New York, NY In March 2008; From left to right: Ben Crook, Sian Ahern, Rupert Clervaux, Eben Bull, Mike Bones and Sasha Vine.

Background information
- Origin: London, England
- Genres: Experimental rock Post-rock; Progressive rock Avant-garde
- Years active: 2007–2011
- Label: The Social Registry
- Members: Rupert Clervaux; Ben Crook; Sian Ahern with Sasha Vine; Mike Bones; Eben Bull; Graham Barton; Daniel Stewart
- Past members: Douglas Hart; Andy Ingle
- Website: www.sianalicegroup.com

Sian Alice Group was an English post-rock band with roots in experimental music and the avant-garde.

The group was founded in 2006 and began working on their debut album 59.59 shortly thereafter. Recorded at Grays Inn Road, Clervaux’s London studio, 59.59 spans exactly 59 minutes and 59 seconds. As Clervaux also works as an engineer and producer who has collaborated with J. Spaceman, Alexis Taylor, Spring Heel Jack and Treader records, he carries a unique production style throughout the album. 59:59 features contributions from Sasha Vine, Douglas Hart (Jesus & Mary Chain), John Coxon (Spring Heel Jack) and Brian DeGraw (Gang Gang Dance). The record received good reviews, with NME calling it 59.59 a "stunning debut album," that is "always breathtaking," while All Music Guide says it is "an astounding album, quite unlike anything one’s heard before."

In June 2008, the group released The Dusk Line, a four-track EP that was recorded during the sessions for 59.59 and features ballads made up of just piano and vocals.

The group finished off 2008 with a full US tour opening for A Place To Bury Strangers and the release of a 12" called Remix, which features collaborations with Alexis Taylor (Hot Chip), Brian DeGraw (Gang Gang Dance) and Spring Heel Jack.

In 2009, Sian Alice Group completed their second album, Troubled, Shaken Etc.. Sessions took place throughout the second half of 2008 at Grays Inn Road and show the band continuing their series of explorations with live mainstays Mike Bones, Eben Bull and Sasha Vine, as well as John Coxen, Daniel Stewart and Graham Barton. After Spring tours in both the US and the UK (with Vetiver and Deerhunter respectively) and an appearance at ATP, Troubled, Shaken Etc. was released. The group played the ATP New York 2010 music festival in Monticello, New York in September 2010.

The band announced their breakup in late 2011 via their official Facebook page, along with the start of a new musical project, Eaux, featuring Sian Alice Group members Sian Ahern, Ben Crook, and Stephen Warrington. The members of this new project cited artistic differences as the reason for ending Sian Alice Group, as they became interested in more electronic music production.

== Discography ==
- Nightsong 7" (2007)
- Remix 12" (2008)
- The Dusk Line EP (2008)
- 59.59 (2008)
- Troubled, Shaken, Etc. (2009)
