= Dins =

2006 studio album by Psychic Ills

Studio album by Psychic Ills
- Released: February 7, 2006
- Length: 37:56
- Label: The Social Registry

Psychic Ills chronology
Mental Violence II: Diamond City (2005)	Dins (2006)	Early Violence (2006)

Professional ratings
Review scores
Source	Rating
AllMusic	3.5/5 stars
Pitchfork	7.4/10
Stylus	B−
Tiny Mix Tapes	3/5 marks

Dins is the debut studio album by American rock band Psychic Ills. It was released on February 7, 2006, by the Social Registry.

== Track listing ==
Dins track listing
No.	Title	Length
1.	"East"	1:39
2.	"Electriclife"	5:25
3.	"Untitled"	4:25
4.	"January Rain"	5:38
5.	"Inauration"	1:57
6.	"I Knew My Name"	8:32
7.	"Witchcraft Breaker"	2:12
8.	"Another Day Another Night"	8:08
Total length:		37:56
