= IN.RAK.DUST =

Mixtape by Dutch E Germ
- Released: March 5, 2014
- Genre: Bass; experimental; platinum beats
- Length: 37:23
- Label: UNO
- Producer: Tim DeWit

IN.RAK.DUST is the debut mixtape of Dutch E Germ, a project by musician Tim DeWit formerly of Gang Gang Dance. It was released on the UNO label on March 5, 2014. IN.RAK.DUST is an experimental bass and dub mixtape which constantly change in terms of tone and tension, which reflects the many tragedies that went on in DeWit's life. Reviews from music journalists were favorable, one critic calling it the "most technically daring and impressively produced" release of 2014.

== Composition and concept ==
IN.RAK.DUST is completely moving, and extremely special in that it possesses the feel and emotion of something made completely organically. I'm aware that it was crafted inside the guts of a computer but I don't feel that as a listener. The passion transcends the medium.

— Tim DeWit in an interview with Dazed

IN.RAK.DUST constantly shifts from light to dark in terms of tone and tension. This intensity of the mixtape reflects the intensity of the many bad occurrences DeWit went through in his life such as being near the Twin Towers during the September 2001 attacks and being shot by a 16-year-old in Grand Rapids, Michigan. Resident Advisor critic Andrew Ryce described IN.RAK.DUST's opener, "IntroXXXWar," as a metaphor for the time DeWit was shot; it begins with a three-minute part of soothing chime sounds before it is interrupted by a screaming sound effect. As film director Leilah Weinraub explained the mixtape's change of mood, “it makes me think about the news, info, history, the telling of history, and if I want to participate in the world or not. It makes me feel angry enough see new possibilities.”

The sound palette of IN.RAK.DUST consist of acoustic and human-produced instruments that sound like or turn into colorfully unusual textures; examples include rattlesnake-like sounds made by drum noises or synthesizers creating bagpipe melodies. Ryce noted all of the sounds to have the cloudless quality of "uncomfortable" vaporwave aesthetics; examples include the piano on the title track, the glass harp on "40z Angel" and the vocal samples on "Nami Nami" and "Rani." DeWit based the variety of the sounds on the mixtape on his actual real-life desire to visit other places.

The time and place of the music that influences the mixtape's styles varies drastically from each track; "Black Sea" was inspired by wanting to hear music from the Black Sea region while in a Gang Gang Dance tour in Istanbul, and also contains influences of music of the culture of Balkans. “Elephant” has a lead melody line in the style of gamelan, and “Hausa Riddim” is driven by a modern dance music drum beat but also includes elements of Hausa music. DeWit claimed that he looks for new, exciting parts of other cultures outside of the United States, such as music of Somalia, to keep him happy through the many tragedies that went on his life. Similar to the works of Gang Gang Dance, IN.RAK.DUST use elements of contemporary dance music and "rearranges them into forms that should be unwieldy but hold up anyway," as Resident Advisor critic Andrew Ryce analyzed. Ryce also described the mixtape as a detailed destruction of hip-hop. Journalist Miles Raymer categorized it in two styles: one as a "new kind of dub, a worthy spiritual descendent to the music that emanated out of Studio One and the Black Ark back in the day while sounding almost nothing like it," and as a high fidelity psychedelic bass music version of Gang Gang Dance's album Saint Dymphna (2008).

Underground music journalist Adam Harper categorized IN.RAK.DUST under a style he noticed to have formed the previous few years that he coined as "platinum beats," which is music consisting of sounds that have the feel of an expensive yet depressing metal. He noted that elements of foreign music were also present in platinum beats music.

== Reception ==
Professional ratings
Review scores
Source	Rating
Pitchfork	7.6/10
Resident Advisor	4/5

IN.RAK.DUST was listed in a feature of Speakerblogggs, a column by Chart Attack that is a "weekly roundup of great hip-hop that [they] think deserves more play." Ryce praised the mixtape as "addictive" due to the unpredictability of what new sound or texture will enter a track. Raymer, who wrote a review for Pitchfork, honored DeWit for producing a release that's accessible and danceable to mainstream listeners while also remaining very experimental. He praised for being a "mad technological experimentation," which was rare in dub music released at the time despite the genre being formed with this intention. He overall called the mixtape as the "most technically daring and impressively produced albums" of 2014.

== Track listing ==
IN.RAK.DUST
No.	Title	Length
1.	"IntroXXXWar"	3:53
2.	"Black Sea"	3:38
3.	"Nami Nami"	3:00
4.	"IN.RAK.DUST"	3:33
5.	"Nine"	4:03
6.	"Elephant"	2:51
7.	"40oz Angel"	3:52
8.	"Mint Noise"	2:27
9.	"Rani"	2:58
10.	"Real Cuts Blud"	2:06
11.	"Hausa Riddim"	5:02
Total length:		37:23

== Release history ==
Region	Date	Format(s)	Label
Worldwide	March 5, 2014	Digital download	UNO
