= All the Way (Growing album) =

Studio album by Growing
- Released: September 9, 2008
- Genre: Noise
- Length: 36:43
- Label: The Social Registry

Professional ratings
Review scores
Source	Rating
Allmusic	3.5/5 stars
Pitchfork Media	(7.7/10)

All the Way is a noise album by Growing released in 2008. It was released by The Social Registry.

== Track listing ==
No.	Title	Length
1.	"Green Flag"	6:15
2.	"Wrong Ride"	6:13
3.	"Rave Pie Only"	6:21
4.	"Innit"	6:28
5.	"Lens Around"	5:30
6.	"Reconstruction"	5:56
