= Jont =

British singer and songwriter

- Jont in 2020

Background information
- Born: Jonathan Mark Smith Whittington; 17 August 1973 (age 53); Marylebone, London, England
- Genres: Folk; rock; pop
- Occupations: Singer; songwriter; musician
- Instruments: Vocals; guitar
- Years active: 1998–present
- Labels: Unlit Records; Howling Turtle
- Website: jontnet.com

Jonathan Mark Smith Whittington (born 17 August 1973), known as Jont, is an English singer, songwriter and musician.

== Early life ==
Dividing his youth between the United States and England, Jont first started writing poems aged fourteen. While still a teenager, he toured the US conducting interviews with a series of prominent American poets including Allen Ginsberg and Jonathan Williams. Returning to England at age eighteen, Whittington began playing for Middlesex as a slow left-arm spinner and Phil Tufnell's number two. He made a single first-class appearance for the county against Cambridge University at Fenner's in 1992. During this period, he attended Manchester University to study English and American literature.

== Music career ==
=== 1998–2010 ===
Frustrated with the limited reception his poetry was achieving, Whittington started performing as a musician in the groups Your Baby and Funnybone before going solo. After leaving University he moved to London, attaining a residency at the 12 Bar Club which he called Unlit. Over the next five years he would play host to and perform with such artists as Tom Baxter, Polly Paulusma, Solomon (later to become The Duke Spirit), Boo Hewerdine, Archie Bronson Outfit, Adem and Antonio Forcione.

During this time Whittington recorded his first albums, Life Is Fine and 28 on his own label Unlit Records.

In 2003, Whittington moved to New York whereupon he began regularly performing with artists such as Joan As Policewoman and Artanker Convoy. During this period he was taken under the wing of Fleetwood Mac manager Tony Dimitriades in Los Angeles and, after moving to Hollywood, began working with several producers including Tom Rothrock, Bill Laswell and Mushroom from Massive Attack.

In 2005, he released the EP One Long Song which was awarded four stars from Q. The track, "You Can Be The Stars", was given high rotation on Dermot O'Leary's BBC Radio 2 show and Whittington appeared on the show to perform live. His cover of Goldfrapp's "Number 1" was subsequently released on the compilation album The Saturday Sessions: The Dermot O'Leary Show. The song "Sweetheart" from the EP was used during the end credits of the Hollywood comedy Wedding Crashers. In mid 2006, Whittington toured the United States. Following this tour at the invitation of the BBC performed as part of the Electric Proms.

2008 saw the release of the album Supernatural, recorded in Paris and London. In September, the track "Another Door Closes" was featured in the season 5 premiere of the US medical drama Grey's Anatomy and received airplay from Jonathan Ross on BBC Radio 2.

In March 2009, the track "Don't Waste All Your Tears" was featured in Season Seven of CBS primetime show Without a Trace, and the song "Sweetheart" was featured in Season Five of Grey's Anatomy in April.

Jont released his third studio album Set It Free in May 2010 followed by his fourth album Whole Again in November 2010 – the first to be released solely thoroughly through his own webstore.

=== 2013–present ===
In 2012, Jont relocated from London to Halifax, Nova Scotia, titling his fifth album Hello Halifax to mark the occasion.

Taking a break to focus on fatherhood, Jont returned in 2017 with An Old Innocence, recording and performing the album live with a full band called The Infinite Possibility. The album was recorded by Howard Bilerman (Arcade Fire)

In 2019, Jont released his seventh album Gentle Warrior, showcasing a quieter singing style that allowed him to sing "from a place inside that felt more connected to my true essence."

Thank You for the Medicine was released in 2020 in collaboration with musicians from around the world. The album which blends electronic beats with choir and string arrangements was mixed by Grammy Award winning engineer Mark Lawson. Jont calls this new sound "medicine pop."

In 2024, Jont released Old Traveller, an album of medicine songs inspired by his experiences with Vipassana meditation and Ayahuasca.

Jont is joined by his band The Fish on his newest album Walk Right Through which is scheduled for release in 2026. The album was mixed by Adam Fuest at Twin Peaks Studio in Wales, UK and will be released on Julian Taylor's Howling Turtle label.

== Unlit ==
In the summer of 2006, Whittington posted a message on his Myspace profile essentially inviting people to offer their homes as venues for his tour of US – a concept simply tagged Unlit. Cameraman Dave Depares joined him to document the tour, and the resulting ten-part video blog series was posted on YouTube entitled The State We're In.

From April to May 2008, Whittington and Depares filmed a second ten-part series of their video blog, this time entitled The House We're In and taking Unlit to Myspace user's houses in the UK.

Shortly after this UK telecoms company Orange commissioned a third series of the show, called The Road We're On, as part of their "I Am Everyone" campaign. Episodes were premiered on Myspace a week before being posted on YouTube. Eight episodes were posted, plus a twenty-minute retrospective documentary, which was posted on Dailymotion.

The Unlit series has been viewed by over two million people.

In October 2008, in conjunction with the BBC Radio 2's Dermot O'Leary show and the BBC's Electric Proms, the Unlit series culminated in an Electric Proms/Unlit event in North London.

"Unlit has developed from an underground movement to a viral phenomenon worldwide" – The Guardian

== Gentle Warrior Ceremonies ==
A natural evolution from the UNLIT concept, in 2019 Jont started performing Sacred Song Ceremonies in keeping with his newfound direction of tapping into the power of music to heal. Described as "gatherings of song and ceremony where the music serves as a unifying energy for connection, celebration and healing", they are held in conscious spaces such as yoga studios and often feature collaborators who offer meditation, mantras or other forms of healing sound. Ceremony tours have taken place across Eastern Canada and Europe.

== Discography ==
=== Studio albums ===
- Walk Right Through (Howling Turtle) (2026)
- Old Traveller (Unlit Records) (2024)
- Thank You for the Medicine (Unlit Records) (2020)
- Gentle Warrior (Unlit Records) (2019)
- An Old Innocence (Unlit Records) (2017)
- Hello Halifax (Unlit Records) (2012)
- Whole Again (Unlit Records) (2010)
- Set It Free (Unlit Records) (2010)
- Supernatural (Unlit Records) (2008)
- One Long Song (Everybody's Records) (2005)
- Everything You Need To Know About Life in 74 minutes (Private) (2002 Italy, 200 copies made for Italian tour)
- 28 (Unlit Records) (2002 Italy, 2008 Rest of World)
- Life Is Fine (1998)

=== Live albums ===
- A Spaceship on the Ocean Floor (Unlit Records) (2019)

=== Single releases ===
Single/EP	Release date	Label	Format(s)	Notes
"The One I've Never Met Who I Long For"	21 January 2026	Howling Turtle	Download Streaming	Eighth single from the album Walk Right Through
"Let's Just Be Friends"	5 November 2025	Howling Turtle	Download Streaming	Seventh single from the album Walk Right Through
"No Lines"	24 September 2025	Howling Turtle	Download Streaming	Sixth single from the album Walk Right Through
"Walk Right Through"	13 August 2025	Howling Turtle	Download Streaming	Fifth single from the album Walk Right Through
"Dark Days Are Over"	2 July 2025	Howling Turtle	Download Streaming	Fourth single from the album Walk Right Through
"All Become One"	21 May 2025	Howling Turtle	Download Streaming	Third single from the album Walk Right Through
"Fingers Crossed"	9 April 2025	Howling Turtle	Download Streaming	Second single from the album Walk Right Through
"The Next Ramana Maharshi"	26 February 2025	Howling Turtle	Download Streaming	First single from the album Walk Right Through
"The Way Home (Post Ceremony Version)"	5 April 2024	Unlit Records	Download Streaming	Eighth single from the album Old Traveller
"Old Traveller (Post Ceremony Version)"	29 March 2024	Unlit Records	Download Streaming	Seventh single from the album Old Traveller
"Healing Holy Golden Feeling"	22 March 2024	Unlit Records	Download Streaming	Sixth single from the album Old Traveller
"Before You (Post Ceremony Version)"	15 March 2024	Unlit Records	Download Streaming	Fifth single from the album Old Traveller
"Supernatural (Post Ceremony Version)"	8 March 2024	Unlit Records	Download Streaming	Fourth single from the album Old Traveller
"This Happened, I'm Sorry (Post Ceremony Version)"	23 February 2024	Unlit Records	Download Streaming	Third single from the album Old Traveller
"Step Into the Fear (Post Ceremony Version)"	9 February 2024	Unlit Records	Download Streaming	Second single from the album Old Traveller
"The Only Answer"	5 January 2024	Unlit Records	Download Streaming	First single from the album Old Traveller
"The Land I Forgot"	5 November 2021	SoulRise Records	Streaming Download	Collaboration with G.Roy; b side includes "The Land I Forgot - DLD Going back to the Land Remix" by G.Roy, Jont and DLD
"This Happened, I'm Sorry"	7 April 2021	Unlit Records	Download Streaming	Includes acoustic b side of "This Happened, I'm Sorry"
"You Are the Dance" (radio edit)	16 October 2020	Unlit Records	Streaming	Fourth single released as a radio edit from the album Thank You for the Medicine
"The End is an Illusion" (radio edit)	26 June 2020	Unlit Records	Streaming	Third single released as a radio edit from the album Thank You for the Medicine
"Thank You for My Happiness"	12 May 2020	Unlit Records	Download Streaming	Second single from the album Thank You for the Medicine
"I Think It Could Be Possible"	31 March 2020	Unlit Records	Download Streaming	First single from the album Thank You for the Medicine
"All My Life"	24 May 2010	Unlit Records	Download Streaming	Accompanied by b-side "The Other Side"
"Enjoy The Good Times"	28 December 2009	Unlit Records	Download	First track from new album Set It Free – accompanied by b-side "Good Luck In New York" on iTunes and extra b-side "Kasbah de Freija" on artist's webstore
"Sweetheart (Radio Mix)"	5 December 2008	Unlit Records	Download	New version of the track featured on the album Supernatural
"Let's Roll"	13 October 2008	Unlit Records	Download	Previously unreleased track taken from the Orange Unlit Tour series
"Candlelit (Radio Edit)"	21 April 2008	Unlit Records	Download	Accompanied by Indiestore-exclusive b-sides "City of The Sun" & "Mosque"
"You Can Be The Stars"	13 March 2006	Everybody's Records	CD, Download	Accompanied by b-sides "House Of Dreaming" and "We Are The Grapefruit"
"When The Time Comes"	2000	Cat Morning CDs	CD	Accompanied by b-sides "Taking My Time", "The Blackout Song" and "When The Time Comes (Live)"
"In Your Eyes"	2000	PeopleSound	CD	Accompanied by b-sides "Splendour" and "The Book That Never Touches The Ground"
"Spring 2000"	2000	PeopleSound	CD	Three tracks – "When The Time Comes", "The Book That Never Touches The Ground" and "Count To Ten (Live)"
