= Mas Ysa =

Canadian electronic musician (born 1983)

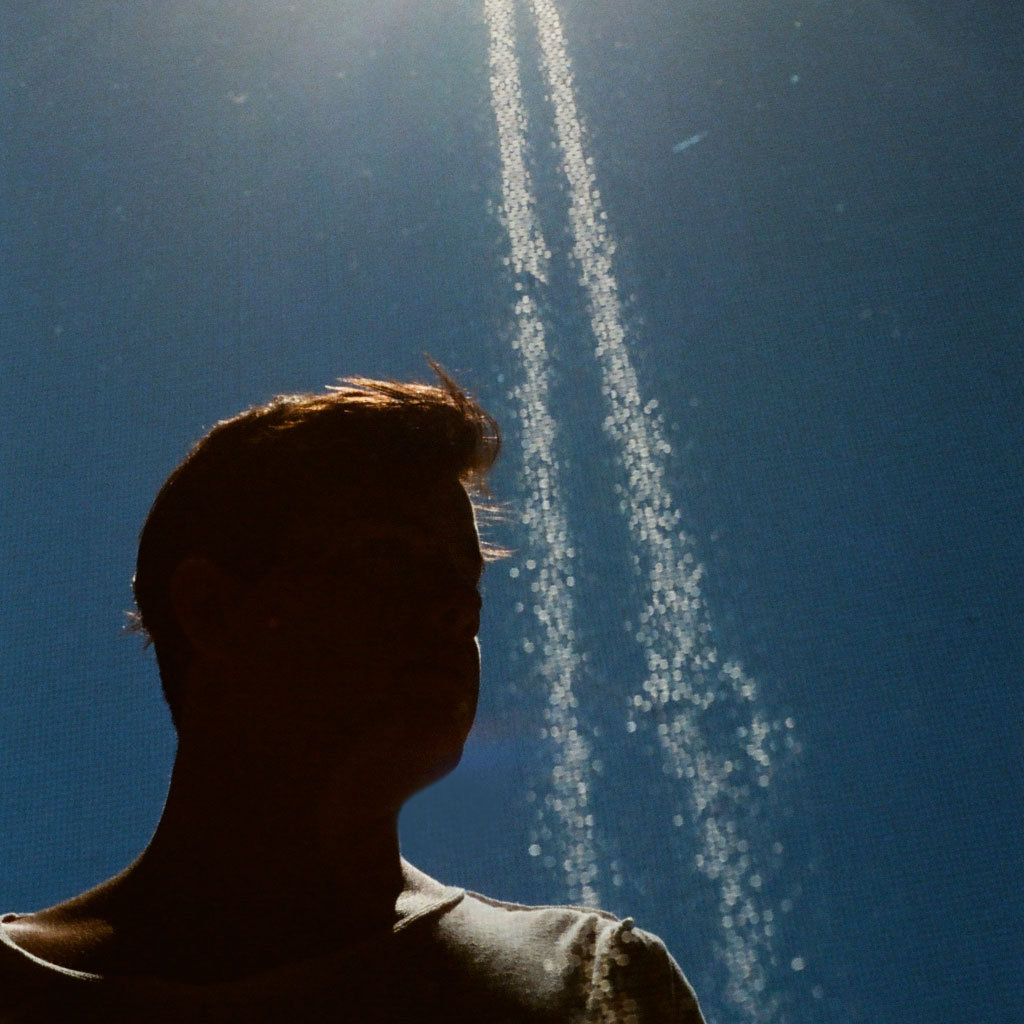
- Mas Ysa by Tony Cox; Woodstock, NY September 2013

Background information
- Born: August 28, 1983 (age 42); Montreal, Quebec, Canada
- Origin: Brooklyn, New York City, US
- Genres: synthpop, avant-garde, indietronica
- Years active: 2012–present
- Labels: Downtown Records MapleMusic Recordings The Social Registry
- Members: Thomas Arsenault
- Website: masysa.com

Mas Ysa /ˈmɑːs ˈiːsə/ MAHS EE-sə is the stage name of Thomas Arsenault, an artist. A native of Montreal, Mas Ysa began writing electronic music in high school while living in São Paulo, Brazil and later attended the Oberlin Conservatory of Music where he studied Modern Composition. Mas Ysa is managed by Rich Zerbo, founder of the NYC-based record label The Social Registry.

== Background and history ==
In 2012, Arsenault began working with Merce Cunningham Dance Company alumnus Rashaun Mitchell on a score for his modern dance piece Interface. Mas Ysa performed the score with the Rashaun Mitchell Dance Company at the Concord Academy in July 2012 and at the Baryshnikov Arts Center in New York in March 2013.

His studio, which he was forced to vacate in the Spring of 2013, was closely associated Brooklyn's "Kent avenue music scene" as it was housed in the same building as 285 Kent, Glasslands and Death By Audio, and was used to make records by Teengirl Fantasy, Laurel Halo, EMA and Light Asylum.

As a video artist, Arsenault's work has been featured at exhibitions at the Brooklyn Academy of Music. and at the 2012 Art Basel festival in Miami, Florida.

== 2013 - 2014: Formation & Worth EP ==
Adopting the Mas Ysa name, Arsenault began playing show in Brooklyn in 2012 and, in April 2013, Mas Ysa toured the southern United States with Deerhunter. In May 2013, he supported Purity Ring as part of the Downtown Music Festival.

On September 16, 2013, Pitchfork Media debuted the first publicly released Mas Ysa track "Why" and announced his signing to Downtown Records. On September 18, Pitchfork designated the song one of their "Best New Tracks". On December 18, Pitchfork Media debuted the self-directed video for "Why" and released the details of Mas Ysa's debut EP, Worth.

Mas Ysa remixed the track "Unhold" by Delorean in January 2014 and supported the band on their appearances in the North East.

Mas Ysa's nine track debut EP Worth was released on February 4 by MapleMusic Recordings in Canada & Downtown Records in the rest of the world; it was met with positive reviews and holds a weighted score of 72 on Metacritic.

Two tracks from the EP were remixed: a remix of "Years" by Dutch E. Germ of Gang Gang Dance premiered on Stereogum and a remix of the track "Why" by Chicago Juke producer Traxman was released.

On February 6, 2014, Pitchfork Media posted the track "Shame" from the Worth EP and again gave it the designation of "Best New Track".

Mas Ysa performed his first on-air radio broadcast on February 19, 2014, on KEXP while touring the West Coast with Lawrence Rothman.

In May 2014, Mas Ysa played his first two shows in Europe making appearances at Primavera Sound in Barcelona, Spain and NOS Primavera Sound in Porto, Portugal. Pitchfork Media chronicled the NOS Primavera appearance in a Documentary which aired on their site.

Following tours supporting the band EMA on the West Coast and Hundred Waters on the East Coast, Mas Ysa performed at the Pitchfork Music Festival on July 19, 2014.

== Discography ==
Extended plays

- Worth EP (Downtown Records / Maple Music Recordings) (2014)
- Seraph (Downtown Records) (2015)
