= Kazuashita =

Studio album by Gang Gang Dance
- Released: June 22, 2018
- Length: 42:16
- Label: 4AD
- Producer: Brian Degraw

Gang Gang Dance chronology
Eye Contact (2011)	Kazuashita (2018)

Singles from Kazuashita
- 1. "Lotus" Released: April 10, 2018; 2. "J-Tree" Released: May 14, 2018; 3. "Young Boy (Marika in Amerika)" Released: June 6, 2018

Professional ratings
Aggregate scores
Source	Rating
AnyDecentMusic?	6.9/10
Metacritic	74/100
Review scores
Source	Rating
AllMusic	4/5 stars
Clash	7/10
DIY	3/5 stars
Drowned in Sound	5/10
Dork	3/5 stars
Exclaim!	6/10
MusicOMH	4/5 stars
NME	4/5 stars
Pitchfork	7.7/10
PopMatters	9/10

Kazuashita is the sixth studio album by American experimental music band Gang Gang Dance. It was released on June 22, 2018 under 4AD.

== Release ==
On April 10, 2018, the first single "Lotus" was released. The release of the single, came with the announcement of their new album after a seven-year hiatus. On May 14, 2018, the second single to be released was "J-Tree". The third single "Young Boy (Marika in Amerika)" was released on June 6, 2018.

== Production ==
The album was produced by the band's pianist Brian DeGraw, and recorded at several studios across New York.

== Tour ==
In support of the album, Gang Gang Dance announced a North American tour to take place from June 2018 to October 2018.

== Critical reception ==
Kazuashita was met with "generally favorable" reviews from critics. At Metacritic, which assigns a weighted average rating out of 100 to reviews from mainstream publications, this release received an average score of 74, based on 18 reviews. Aggregator Album of the Year gave the release a 71 out of 100 based on a critical consensus of 18 reviews. AnyDecentMusic? gave a rating of 6.9 out of 10.

== Track listing ==
Kazuashita track listing
No.	Title	Length
1.	"Infirma Terrae"	1:24
2.	"J-Tree"	5:51
3.	"Lotus"	4:54
4.	"Birth Canal"	1:42
5.	"Kazuashita"	8:07
6.	"Young Boy (Marika in Amerika)"	4:21
7.	"Snake Dub"	3:22
8.	"Too Much, Too Soon"	5:46
9.	"Novae Terrae"	1:22
10.	"Salve on the Sorrow"	5:27
Total length:		42:16

Japan bonus track
No.	Title	Length
11.	"Siamese Locust"

== Personnel ==
Musicians

- Liz Bougatsos – lead vocals
- Brian DeGraw – guitar, drums
- Josh Diamond – guitar
- Shiyé Bidziil – vocals
- Oliver Payne – vocals
- Ryan Sawyer – drums
- Jack Walls – vocals

Production

- Josh Druckman – engineer
- Heba Kadry – mastering
- Sean Maffucci – engineer
- Patrick Higgins – engineer
- Andrew Barker – engineer
- Jorge Elbrecht – mixer
