= Kamakura (disambiguation) =

Kamakura is a city in Kanagawa Prefecture, Japan.

Named after the city are:

- Kamakura period (c.1192–1333), a period in the history of Japan
  - Kamakura shogunate (1192–1333), the shōgun government of the period
- Kamakura (snow dome), festive Japanese snowdomes
- Kamakura (G.I. Joe), a character in the G.I. Joe universe
- Kamakura Corporation, a U.S. financial risk software company
- Kamakura (EP), an EP by Gang Gang Dance

== See also ==
- Kamacuras, a fictional gigantic praying mantis in the Godzilla film series
- Izuru Kamukura, the mastermind behind "The Tragedy" in the Japanese media franchise Danganronpa
