= Early Violence =

2006 compilation album by Psychic Ills

Compilation album by Psychic Ills
- Released: December 5, 2006
- Length: 35:55
- Label: The Social Registry

Psychic Ills chronology
Dins (2006)	Early Violence (2006)	Mirror Eye (2009)

Professional ratings
Review scores
Source	Rating
AllMusic	3/5 stars
Pitchfork	6.1/10
Stylus	C

Early Violence is the debut compilation album by American rock band Psychic Ills. It was released on December 5, 2006, by the Social Registry. It is a compilation of Psychic Ills' first two releases Mental Violence I (2003) and Mental Violence II: Diamond City (2005).

== Track listing ==
Early Violence track listing
No.	Title	Length
1.	"Vice"	2:24
2.	"Killer"	4:25
3.	"Diamond City"	4:00
4.	"Days"	7:08
5.	"Highway of Death"	3:51
6.	"4Am"	6:13
7.	"Red-Split"	3:35
8.	"Diamond City (Cropped and Screwed)"	4:19
Total length:		35:55
