= Inner Journey Out =

2016 studio album by Psychic Ills

Studio album by Psychic Ills
- Released: June 3, 2016
- Length: 63:57
- Label: Sacred Bones

Psychic Ills chronology
One Track Mind (2013)	Inner Journey Out (2016)

Inner Journey Out is the fifth studio album by American rock band Psychic Ills. It was released on June 3, 2016, by Sacred Bones Records.

== Critical reception ==
Professional ratings
Aggregate scores
Source	Rating
AnyDecentMusic?	6.3/10
Metacritic	70/100
Review scores
Source	Rating
AllMusic	3.5/5 stars
Blurt	3/5 stars
Financial Times	3/5 stars
MusicOMH	3.5/5 stars
PopMatters	7/10
Q	3/5 stars
Record Collector	3/5 stars
The Skinny	3/5 stars
Uncut	8/10

At Metacritic, which assigns a normalized rating out of 100 to reviews from mainstream critics, the album has an average score of 70 based on 8 reviews, indicating "generally favorable reviews".

== Track listing ==
Inner Journey Out track listing
No.	Title	Length
1.	"Back to You"	3:59
2.	"Another Change"	5:21
3.	"I Don't Mind"	4:40
4.	"Mixed Up Mind"	3:40
5.	"All Alone"	3:34
6.	"New Mantra"	2:04
7.	"Coca-Cola Blues"	7:11
8.	"Baby"	4:15
9.	"Music in My Head"	3:27
10.	"No Worry"	3:35
11.	"Hazel Green"	5:49
12.	"Confusion (I'm Alright)"	3:16
13.	"Ra Wah Wah"	9:12
14.	"Fade Me Out"	3:54
Total length:		63:57
