= Psychic Ills =

US musical group

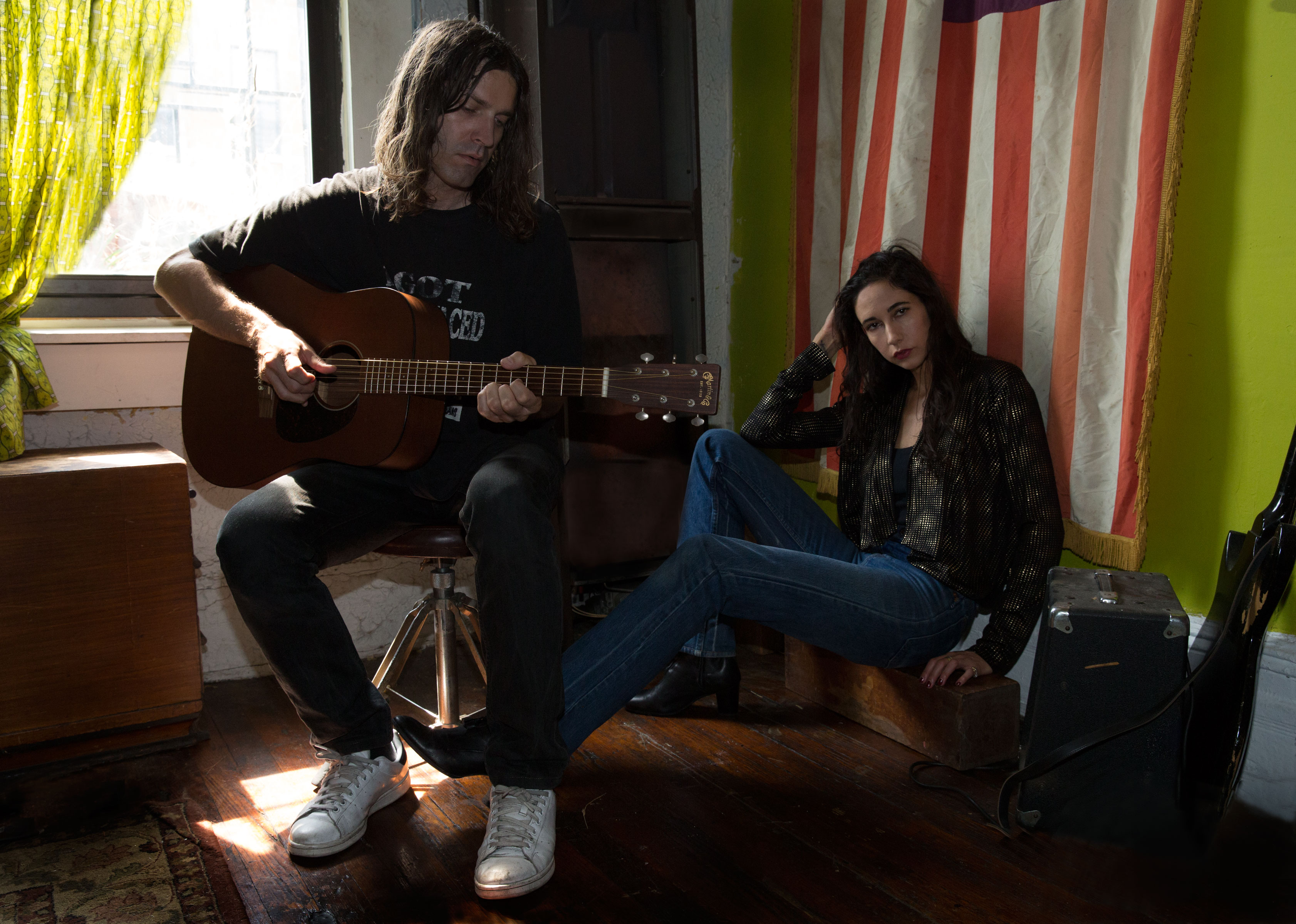
- Liz Hart & Tres Warren

Background information
- Origin: New York City, New York, U.S.
- Genres: Psychedelic rock Experimental rock
- Years active: 2003–present
- Labels: Sacred Bones Records, The Social Registry, The Spring Press, RVNG INTL.
- Members: Elizabeth Hart; Adam Amram; Jon Catfish Delorme; Brent Cordero
- Past members: Tom Gluibizzi; Chris Millstein; Brian Tamborello; Jimy SeiTang; Tres Warren

Psychic Ills are an American experimental rock/psychedelic rock band from New York City, consisting of Tres Warren (vocals/guitar; 1978-2020), Elizabeth Hart (vocals/bass), Adam Amram, Jon Catfish Delorme, and Brent Cordero. They formed in 2003, and have released five albums, one compilation, four EPs and a number of singles. The band was signed to The Social Registry from 2005 to 2010. Since then its albums have been released by Sacred Bones Records.

== History ==
Tres Warren (1978-2020) was born and raised in Texas, where he attended the University of Texas at Austin and met Elizabeth Hart. Formed by Tres Warren, the band made their debut on the Mental Violence label with the single "Killers" b/w "Vice" in November 2003. It was followed by the four-track EP Mental Violence II: Diamond City released through The Social Registry in November 2005. It included a remix of the title track by Sonic Boom. These two releases together with two tracks that appeared on separate compilations were collected on Early Violence. Warren later described the beginning of the band as "I had just gotten this Roland TR-707 drum machine, and I was getting into programming drums and writing songs. There wasn't really a course planned ahead, and it just evolved into a live band".

The band released their first full-length album, Dins, in February 2006. It featured Tom Gluibizzi (guitar/keyboards) and Brian Tamborello on drums. Concerning the recording process at this time Warren explained that it involved "improvised jamming, and seeing if you could write a song that way". The album's cover art is German Fluxus artist Wolf Vostell's painting Three Hairs and Shadow.

In early 2008, Psychic Ills performed in Marfa, Texas for the opening of artist Jonah Freeman and Justin Lowe's exhibition Hello Meth Lab in the Sun art installation and at the Contemporary Art Museum in Bordeaux, France for the IAO festival. In 2009 they released Mirror Eye preceded by the single "Mantis". In the same year they toured as support to the Butthole Surfers and collaborated with Gibby Haynes.

Instead of recording a new album, the duo released four EPs of experimental material. The first, Telesthetic Tape, appeared on the Danish Skrot Up label and featured two untitled tracks. It was re-released in 2011 on vinyl. In June 2010 the band released the four-track Catoptric EP through The Social Registry. In the same month the Astral Occurrence EP appeared on the Australian label The Spring Press. Lastly, a remix EP entitled FRKWYS Vol. 4 included contributions by Juan Atkins, Gibby Haynes and Hans-Joachim Irmler.

For 2011's Hazed Dream, the band moved to Sacred Bones Records and opted for a more song based approach. Warren explained that "it's definitely been more writing songs and then recording them".

In Spring 2013 the band released their fourth album One Track Mind and toured Europe afterwards. The album featured contributions by Neil Hagerty and artwork by Powell St. John.

On June 3, 2016, they released their fifth album, a double LP titled Inner Journey Out featuring art by Jonah Freeman and Justin Lowe.

Warren died on March 21, 2020, at the age of 41.

== Collaborations ==
Members of Psychic Ills have been involved in various other projects. Elizabeth Hart played bass with Effi Briest and performed with the improvisational dance and music ensemble Skint. Tres Warren collaborated with visual artist Taketo Shimada as Messages and with Drew McDowall of Coil as Compound Eye. Former drummer Brian Tamborello participated in the Boredoms' Boadrum projects and played drums on Mike Wexler's record Sun Wheel.

In 2021, Hart and her husband Iván Diaz Mathé released their album Sounds of the Unborn via Sacred Bones.

== Discography ==
=== Studio albums ===
- Dins (2006)
- Mirror Eye (2009)
- Hazed Dream (2011)
- One Track Mind (2013)
- Inner Journey Out (2016)

=== EPs ===
- Mental Violence II: Diamond City (2005)
- Astral Occurrence (2010)
- Catoptric (2010)
- FRKWYS Vol. 4: Psychic Ills (2010)
- Telesthetic Tape (2010)

=== Singles ===
- "Killers" (2003)
- "Zoned" (2012 - split single with Moon Duo)
- "Radar Eyez" (The Godz) (2013)
- "Never Learn Not to Love / Cease to Exist" (2020)

=== Compilation ===
- Early Violence (2006)
- "Psych-Out Christmas" (November 2013)
- "Love Me Two Times - A Psych Tribute To The Doors" (February 2014)

== Other sources ==
- Go to the Radio: An Interview with Psychic Ills Identity Theory, November 24, 2008.
