= Awesomer =

Studio album by Blood on the Wall
- Released: 6 September 2005
- Recorded: Winter 2005 at The Rare Book Room
- Genre: Indie rock
- Length: 31:54
- Labels: Social Registry, FatCat
- Producer: Nicolas Vernhes

Blood on the Wall chronology
Blood on the Wall (2003)	Awesomer (2005)	Liferz (2008)

Awesomer is a 2005 album by Brooklyn-based indie rock band Blood on the Wall. Its music combines influences like My Bloody Valentine, Pixies, Sonic Youth and Pavement.

== Track listing ==
No.	Title	Length
1.	"Stoner Jam"	3:05
2.	"Reunite on Ice"	3:01
3.	"Heat from the Day"	1:50
4.	"I'd Like to Take You out Tonight"	3:37
5.	"You Are a Mess"	2:12
6.	"Keep Your Eyes"	1:58
7.	"Gone"	1:31
8.	"Mary Susan"	2:54
9.	"Can You Hear Me"	0:49
10.	"Right to Lite Tonight"	1:40
11.	"Get the Fuck off My Cloud"	2:19
12.	"Dead Edge of Town"	1:48
13.	"Dead Edge of Town"	2:09
14.	"Going to Heaven"	3:01
Total length:		32:00

Professional ratings
Review scores
Source	Rating
AllMusic	3.5/5 stars
Pitchfork Media	(8.1/10)
Rolling Stone	(Positive)
