= Saint Dymphna (album) =

Studio album by Gang Gang Dance
- Released: 5 September 2008
- Recorded: Mid-2008
- Genres: Ambient; avant-garde; electronica; dance-rock; psychedelia; worldbeat
- Length: 44:09
- Labels: The Social Registry; Warp
- Producer: Tim DeWit

Gang Gang Dance chronology
RAWWAR (2007)	Saint Dymphna (2008)	Kamakura (2010)

Singles from Saint Dymphna
- 1. "House Jam" Released: 11 September 2008; 2. "First Communion" Released: 16 March 2009

Saint Dymphna is the self-produced fourth studio album by American experimental music band Gang Gang Dance. Released in 2008 by The Social Registry, it would be the final album for the label, before moving on to 4AD for 2011's lauded Eye Contact. It received positive reviews from critics.

The record would also mark the departure of founding drummer Tim DeWitt, who would be replaced by Jesse Lee for their next full-length work.

== Critical reception ==
"Desert Storm"
The musical construction of "Desert Storm" explores ideas from several genres and is typical of Gang Gang Dance's composition style. The song also exemplifies Liz Bougatsos' varying vocal delivery.

Professional ratings
Aggregate scores
Source	Rating
Metacritic	78/100
Review scores
Source	Rating
AllMusic	4/5 stars
The A.V. Club	B−
Blender	4/5 stars
The Boston Phoenix	3/4 stars
The Guardian	4/5 stars
The Irish Times	4/5 stars
Pitchfork	8.5/10
Q	3/5 stars
Rolling Stone	3/5 stars
Spin	3.5/5 stars

Media response to Saint Dymphna was generally positive; aggregating website Metacritic reported a normalised rating of 78 out of 100 in October 2008 based on 27 critical reviews. Drowned in Sound's John Semple praised Gang Gang Dance's expansion of their sonic palette and noted that the album offers "genuine moments of hope and salvation amongst the unrest". Marc Masters of Pitchfork claimed that "the newfound clarity produces neither thinness nor tedium, but simply a direct, unadulterated power". AllMusic's Thom Jurek explained that the record is unique and the band's most fully realised project to date. These positive comments were encapsulated by Jody White of No Ripcord, who gave the album a maximum rating of ten out of ten by praising the band for a memorable album full of challenging and genre-defining sounds.

Slant Magazine's M. Clark gave Saint Dymphna a rating of three-and-a-half stars out of five, one of the lowest that it received from notable publications, and commented that Gang Gang Dance's energy "often falls flat and their eclecticism is more distracting than compelling". Critic Robert Christgau described the album in an Honorable Mention review as "soundscape dance-rock more artful than arty." Maddy Costa of The Guardian also suggested that the album is eclectic, but gave it a favourable rating by concluding that it is "arranged with exquisite precision". Reed Fischer of Paste claimed that the record is "a dangerously sane blueprint for producers trying to capture what "futuristic" sounds like right now". Saint Dymphna figured highly in several end-of-year best album lists for 2008, notably, at number three by Cokemachineglow, at number five by The Wire, at number nine by Tiny Mix Tapes, and at number 13 by Drowned in Sound. It was named Best Album of 2008 by FACT.

== Track listing ==
No.	Title	Length
1.	"Bebey"	4:53
2.	"First Communion"	3:05
3.	"Blue Nile"	3:10
4.	"Vacuum"	4:13
5.	"Princes" (featuring Tinchy Stryder)	4:26
6.	"Inners Pace"	4:16
7.	"Afoot"	3:25
8.	"House Jam"	4:45
9.	"Interlude (No Known Home)"	1:16
10.	"Desert Storm"	5:10
11.	"Dust"	5:30

Japanese edition bonus tracks
No.	Title	Length
12.	"House Jam" (XXXChange Remix)	4:59
13.	"House Jam" (Hot Chip Remix)	7:01

== Release history ==
Region	Date	Label	Format(s)	Catalog
Japan	5 September 2008	P-Vine Records	CD	PCD-22316
United Kingdom	20 October 2008	Warp	CD, digital download, LP	WARP171
United States	21 October 2008	The Social Registry	CD, digital download, LP	TSR050
