= Kamakura (EP) =

EP by Gang Gang Dance
- Released: August 2010
- Recorded: August 2007
- Genre: Experimental rock, electronic music
- Length: 15:10
- Label: Southern Records

Gang Gang Dance chronology
Saint Dymphna (2008)	Kamakura (2010)	Eye Contact (2011)

Kamakura is the third EP released by the New York based band Gang Gang Dance. It was recorded in August 2007 for Southern Records Latitudes series. It was released in August 2010 as a limited edition pressing of 1000 hand-numbered, rubber stamped CDs and 1000 vinyl only CDs (700 black, 300 white).

== Track listing ==
1. "Amorphous History (Closing Seen)" – 15:10
