= Sounds of the Unborn =

Studio album by Luca Yupanqui
- Released: April 2, 2021
- Genres: Dark ambient; post-industrial; glitch; experimental
- Length: 42:02
- Label: Sacred Bones
- Producers: Elizabeth Hart and Iván Diaz Mathé

Sounds of the Unborn is an experimental music album produced by Elizabeth Hart and Iván Diaz Mathé based on recordings of their then-unborn daughter Luca Yupanqui, released by Sacred Bones Records on April 2, 2021. The couple recorded Luca during her mother's third trimester of pregnancy using MIDI biosonic technology to pick up electromagnetic impulses and translate it into digital sound which was then manipulated by synthesizers played by Diaz Mathé. A remix album called Conversations was released September 9, 2022, with contributors including Suzanne Ciani, Peaking Lights, Dean Hurley, and Laraaji.

== Style and reception ==
Sounds of the Unborn ratings
Review scores
Source	Rating
AllMusic	3.5/5 stars
Backseat Mafia	8/10
Spectrum Culture	60%

Per AllMusic's Paul Simpson, the album consists of "a strange mélange of rapidly pulsating heartbeats, amniotic textures, and reflexive movements, resembling an unstructured blend of dark ambient, post-industrial, and glitch" and is "entirely at home on a label that sometimes releases horror film scores". Regarding the latter statement, Simpson particularly notes "the clattering, swooping" "V5" which "could easily soundtrack an intense psychological thriller", and "V1" "feels more like a fractured broadcast from another dimension, straining to transmit some sort of coded message." On the other hand, "other tracks feel much lighter -- Hart must have been in a more relaxed state when "V2.1" was recorded, as it sounds significantly more tranquil and weightless, even approaching a simple melody and faint, rippling beats before bursts of delay drive it back downward", "V3.2" "sounds more like several streams of water drops trickling into a pool in a cave, gradually clustering before somehow resisting gravity and scattering outward", and "V4.2" "begins with flute-like notes which become suspended before gradually elevating, recalling some of Pauline Anna Strom's alien soundscapes. Yet like much of the rest of the album, there's something familiar and comforting about it as well." Backseat Mafia's James Kilkenny says the album "provides fascinating – and aurally pleasing –discoveries" and is "far beyond the mere novelty that the '...first album made by a foetus' description suggests: the collective qualities of hibernation, impenetrable solace, and insightful indulgences into an unknown world are all sewn throughout; sewn with – and inducing – deep contemplation; all via a diverse ensemble of electronica."

Spectrum Culture's Thomas Stremfel notes that the music "manages to provide a consistently unsettling atmosphere", such as "V2.2" in which, at random intervals, something resembling an alert chime will ring out to the void. The persistent percussion that had been pushing the song forward suddenly cuts out near the end, and the chime becomes dissonant, making what was a relatively consistent feature of the song now unfamiliar and unwelcoming. Even looking beyond the gimmick, it's hard to deny the impact that these tracks hold." The album's aesthetics "are not completely organic or natural, so there were likely more artistic liberties taken on the production side than Hart or Mathé are willing to admit", and with its "fully realized" "dank and ethereal soundscape" seemingly being decided ahead of recording, "it's disappointing that the couple didn't do much to build a narrative based on their relationship with Luca", possibly by "demonstrating the progression of the pregnancy through subtle changes in tone". Without this, the album "lacks any real sense of direction, which might be an intentional decision, representing the great unknown that a developing fetus experiences in the womb. But the way the album flows currently has the feeling of little more than a sonic collage all the way up to the closing track "V4.3 pt. 1" which unceremoniously fades out at the end with no conclusion, leaving the listener feeling confused and likely unsatisfied."

== Track listing ==
All music is composed by Luca Yupanqui.

Sounds of the Unborn track listing
No.	Title	Length
1.	"V5"	6:35
2.	"V4.3 pt. 2"	4:29
3.	"V2.1"	2:04
4.	"V2.2"	5:18
5.	"V3.2"	3:33
6.	"V4.2"	4:26
7.	"V4.1"	4:54
8.	"V1"	5:08
9.	"V3.1"	1:38
10.	"V4.3 pt. 1"	3:53
Total length:		42:02

== Personnel ==
- Luca Yupanqui – composer
- Elizabeth Hart – producer, editing
- Iván Diaz Mathé – producer, synthesizer, recording engineer, mixing, editing, cover photo
- Tomás Putruele – modular synthesizer
- Mark Bihler – mastering engineer
- Martín Borini – artwork
