= Vision Swim =

Studio album by Growing
- Released: April 24, 2007
- Recorded: October 2006
- Genre: Noise
- Label: Troubleman Records

Professional ratings
Review scores
Source	Rating
Pitchfork Media	(7.4/10)

Vision Swim is a noise album by Growing released in 2007. It was released by Troubleman Records.

== Track listing ==
1. "Limbo" (2:38)
2. "On Anon" (15:20)
3. "Morning Drive" (11:13)
4. "Emseepee" (4:25)
5. "Lightfoot" (6:28)
