= One Track Mind (Psychic Ills album) =

2013 studio album by Psychic Ills

Studio album by Psychic Ills
- Released: February 19, 2013
- Recorded: 2012
- Length: 43:22
- Label: Sacred Bones

Psychic Ills chronology
Hazed Dream (2011)	One Track Mind (2013)	Inner Journey Out (2016)

One Track Mind is the fourth studio album by American rock band Psychic Ills. It was released on February 19, 2013, by Sacred Bones Records.

== Critical reception ==
Professional ratings
Aggregate scores
Source	Rating
AnyDecentMusic?	6.3/10
Metacritic	70/100
Review scores
Source	Rating
The 405	4/10
AllMusic	3.5/5 stars
Beats Per Minute	78/100
Blurt	7/10
Filter	80/100
Gaffa	3/6 stars
MusicOMH	3/5 stars
Pitchfork	6.0/10
PopMatters	6/10
Uncut	7/10

At Metacritic, which assigns a normalized rating out of 100 to reviews from mainstream critics, the album has an average score of 70 based on 13 reviews, where 8 are positive, 5 are mixed and 0 negative. indicating "generally favorable reviews".

== Track listing ==
One Track Mind track listing
No.	Title	Length
1.	"One More Time"	3:41
2.	"See You There"	5:03
3.	"Might Take a While"	3:45
4.	"Depot"	3:22
5.	"Tried to Find It"	5:18
6.	"FBI"	3:33
7.	"I Get By"	4:19
8.	"City Sun"	4:01
9.	"Western Metaphor"	4:56
10.	"Drop Out"	5:24
11.	"Violet Horizon (Bonus Track)"	01:30
Total length:		43:22
