= Mirror Eye =

2009 studio album by Psychic Ills

Studio album by Psychic Ills
- Released: January 20, 2009
- Length: 43:47
- Label: The Social Registry

Psychic Ills chronology
Early Violence (2006)	Mirror Eye (2009)	Hazed Dream (2011)

Singles from Mirror Eye
- 1. "Mantis" Released: January 14, 2009; 2. "Eyes Closed" Released: February 27, 2009

Mirror Eye is the second studio album by American rock band Psychic Ills. It was released on January 20, 2009, by the Social Registry.

== Critical reception ==
Professional ratings
Aggregate scores
Source	Rating
Metacritic	61/100
Review scores
Source	Rating
AllMusic	4/5 stars
Pitchfork	1.4/10
PopMatters	6/10
Prefix	7.5/10
Slant	4/5 stars
Tiny Mix Tapes	3/5 marks

At Metacritic, which assigns a weighted rating out of 100 to reviews from mainstream critics, the album has an average score of 61 based on 8 reviews, indicating "generally favorable reviews". Jennifer Kally of Dusted stated that "[t]he balance – between groove and experiment, organic and synthetic sound – shifts constantly on this very strong album, sometimes prodding listeners to think, other times comforting them with familiar sounds and, occasionally, overwhelming them with ephemeral beauty."

While the album is generally played less than some of those that followed it, certain tracks like “Fingernail Tea” and “Meta” are regarded as significantly important to their career by Spotify, shown in their playlist “This Is Psychic Ills”.

== Background and composition ==
On Mirror Eye, Psychic Ills moved away from traditional song structures, embracing a largely improvised sound. The album is marked by its drone-based compositions, minimal percussion, and unstructured pieces. Opening with the 11-minute track "Mantis," the album establishes its approach with a continuous synth loop and a simple hand drum rhythm, setting the tone for the record’s experimental nature.

Other tracks, such as "Sub Synth," are brief and sparse, described by some as an aural experiment akin to the sound of power tools. Throughout the album, the band continues to explore long, meandering pieces, often without clear direction or resolution. While the album has moments of potential, such as the blurry, vocal-treated "Meta," the majority of tracks are criticized for feeling unfinished or lacking in cohesion.

=== Reception ===
Mirror Eye received mixed to negative reviews, with many critics questioning the album’s improvisational approach. While the record is undoubtedly experimental, its lack of structure and coherence led some to describe it as a meandering, impromptu practice session rather than a fully realized artistic statement. The album’s abstract nature and absence of conventional songcraft have been polarizing, with some listeners finding it unengaging or tedious. The 11-minute opener, "Mantis," has been criticized for its repetitive drone, while "Sub Synth" has been compared to the sound of power tools, a description that some listeners found unappealing.

Despite its experimental approach, Mirror Eye has moments of potential, particularly in tracks like "Meta," which some believe could have been expanded into a more complex and hypnotic piece with further development. However, the album’s overall execution has led many to question the band’s commitment to the improvisational technique. While other experimental acts, such as Animal Collective, were achieving success by incorporating more accessible elements, Mirror Eye’s lack of refinement and structure led to comparisons with albums that, in the eyes of some critics, balanced abstract elements with greater care.

=== Legacy ===
Despite the criticisms, Mirror Eye remains an example of Psychic Ills' commitment to abstract sound exploration. Though it may not have resonated with all listeners, the album reflects the band's desire to push the boundaries of their music. It serves as an important entry in the band’s discography, albeit one that divides opinion due to its uncompromising approach to experimentalism and its departure from more traditional forms of songcraft.

== Track listing ==
Mirror Eye track listing
No.	Title	Length
1.	"Mantis"	10:47
2.	"Meta"	4:20
3.	"Sub Synth"	2:09
4.	"Eyes Closed"	3:10
5.	"I Take You As My Wife Again"	9:35
6.	"Fingernail Tea"	5:52
7.	"The Way Of"	4:52
8.	"Go to the Radio"	2:43
Total length:		43:47
