= Blood on the Wall =

American indie rock band

- Origin: Brooklyn, New York
- Genre: Indie rock
- Instruments: Vocals, guitars, drums
- Years active: 2003–present
- Label: The Social Registry
- Members: Brad Shanks; Courtney Shanks; Miggy Littleton
- Past members: Zach Campbell
- Website: https://www.bloodonthewall.com

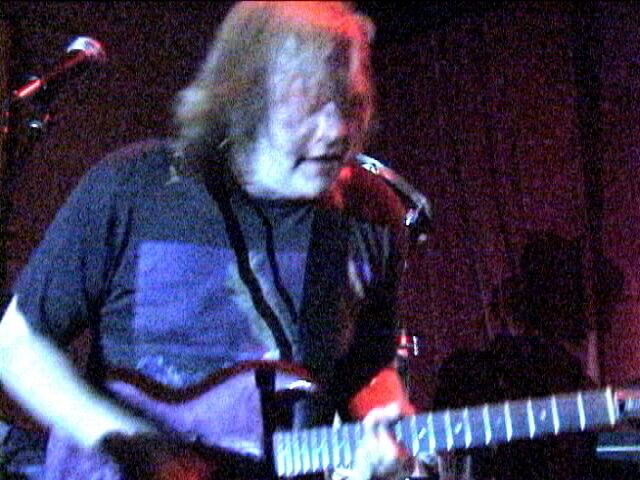
Brad Shanks

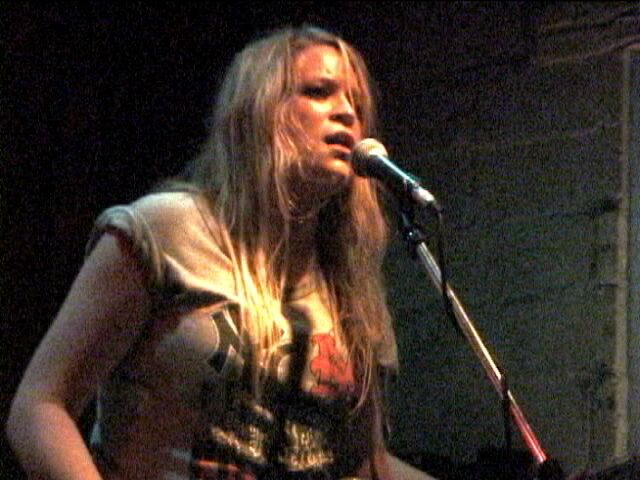
Courtney Shanks

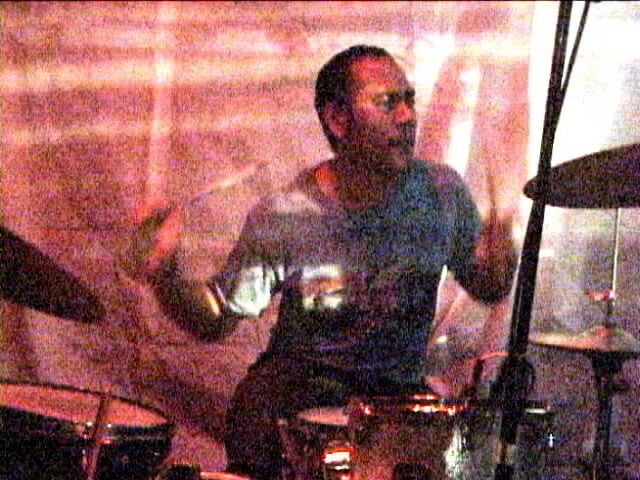
Miggy Littleton

Blood on the Wall is a lo-fi, Brooklyn-based indie rock band, influenced by bands like The Jesus and Mary Chain, Pavement, Pixies, and Sonic Youth. Band members include siblings Courtney (bassist/vocalist) and Brad Shanks (guitarist/vocalist) and drummer Miggy Littleton. They have released three full-length albums, Blood on the Wall (2003), Awesomer (2005), and Liferz (2008). Blood on the Wall are signed to the Brooklyn-based label The Social Registry.

== Discography ==
- Blood on the Wall (2003)
- Awesomer (Social Registry, FatCat) (2005)
- Liferz (2008)
