= Growing (band) =

American drone/ambient/noise music band

- Origin: Olympia, Washington, United States
- Genres: Experimental, drone, ambient, noise, experimental rock, drone metal (early), electronic, neo-psychedelia, minimalism, post-rock
- Years active: 2001–present
- Labels: Kranky, Vice, The Social Registry, Animal Disguise, Archive
- Members: Kevin Doria; Joe Denardo
- Past members: Zack Carlson; Eryn Ross; Sadie Laska

Growing is a drone music/ambient music/noise music band formed in Olympia, Washington, and currently based in Brooklyn, New York. The group was founded in 2001 by Kevin Doria (electric bass guitar), Joe Denardo (electric guitar), and Zack Carlson (drums). Carlson left following their first album, and the band continued as a duo until 2009, when they recruited Sadie Laska (samplers, microphone) to form a new trio. The group's music has gradually progressed from slow, instrumental drone pieces through works in noise and ambient music toward more propulsive, rhythm driven music. Their live shows are consistently known for being very loud and for playing straight through their set without breaks or banter between songs.

== Notable and Recent Releases and Tours ==
Growing have released albums on labels such as Kranky, Animal Disguise, Archive, Megablade/Troubleman, and The Social Registry. At the end of 2007 and the beginning of 2008 Growing released their first two releases for The Social Registry; a 7-inch single for the label Social Club series and a mini-lp entitled Lateral. In 2010 they released an album on Vice Records.

In April 2008 Growing embarked on a tour of Europe and the United Kingdom with the Japanese band Boris.

In December 2010 Growing performed at the All Tomorrow's Parties curated by Godspeed You! Black Emperor.

== Equipment, Technique, Composition, and Aesthetic Evolution ==
Joe is left-handed and Kevin is right-handed. In recent concerts, both Doria and Denardo have used pairs of amplifiers for true stereo guitar setups. In early shows, Kevin generally played bass with his back to the audience, and then Joe played seated, much like members of kindred spirits Spacemen 3. In recent (2008) concerts, all members play standing, using effects units on the floor and on tables (which they control with their hands).

Growing's music has been consistently grounded in repetitive, droning guitar sounds, which may be heavily processed (sometimes beyond identifiable guitar timbre). They regularly employ delay/looper pedals, feedback, the Ebow, and or phrase-samplers to create indefinitely sustained sounds, which are blended in and out of the music volume pedals or mixers.

In addition to pedals, both Doria and Denardo started using a variety of instruments and effects not traditionally designed or marketed for guitar players. These include touch-pad effectors, rhythm machines, and phrase samplers whose hands-on control (and drastic processing) is usually marketed for DJs, which members of Growing praise for their simplicity and immediacy of control.

While most loop-driven guitar performances involve building many layers into a harmonically complex musical motive with unified, locked rhythm (and the option to solo over the loop), Growing's approach is quite different. Their sound involves capturing simple, contrasting drones or motifs moving in separate looping streams (sometimes deliberately out of sync for diffuse, textural effect), which can then be introduced and removed independently for greater textural subtlety and rhythmic diffusion. Where most guitarists may rout their guitar through a single series of effects, Growing's setups may involve routing their particular instrument through multiple divergent chains effect chains and looper-pedals into parallel amps and/or mixer channels; This allows separate sounds to be captured and mixed in/out of play independently. Hence their approach may lend as much to early DJ technique as it does to traditional electric guitar performance. Denardo has referred describes this process as "... basically, our whole band is volume pedals." With such technique, they can then compose and execute seamless or dramatic transitions not usually achieved by only two guitars.

When pressed about their sense of composition and improvisation, Joe has stated that many of the transitions during performances are planned, which Kevin (in a different interview) has explained that Growing's writing process is passive and that "...it's all jams."

Across the span of over 6 records, Growing's music has evolved from long (10+ minute) pieces of placid, contemplative droning music (without repeating themes) toward short(er) (3-7 minute) songs of more rhythmic, propulsive, and linear progression. Of notable persistence is the band's consistent lack of recapitulated themes; once there is sonic/textural change, their music seldom revisits a motif. As such, their more "ambient" musics had a "scenic" listening quality, while the more propulsive later material plays more akin to (but still far removed from) "club mix" music. Interviews with the band suggest both Doria and Denardo's musical evolution is not from deliberate ambition, but from curiosity, experimentation, and a continually rotating arsenal of electronic musical equipment.

== Side-projects, other musical contributions ==
Total Life is Doria's side-project. In 2005, he released his first album on Animal Disguise, which was limited to 150 copies and is now sold out. The cassette was reissued on vinyl in early 2007 in a series of 500. In March 2008, Total Life released a second album "Ken Bradshaw" on BrownSounds records. This release featured more propulsive, energetic rhythms against the "wall of sound" guitar playing.

== Discography ==
=== Albums ===
- Diptych (2021)
- Disorder (2016)
- PUMPS (Vice Records, 2010) - CD/LP
- All the Way (The Social Registry, 2008) - CD/LP
- Lateral (The Social Registry, 2008) - CD/LP
- Vision Swim (Megablade/Troubleman, 2007) - CD/LP
- Color Wheel (Megablade, 2006) - CD/LP
- Live (Conspiracy Records, 2005) - CD/2XLP
- His Return (Megablade, 2005) - CD/LP
- The Soul Of The Rainbow And The Harmony Of Light (Kranky/Animal Disguise, 2004) - CD/LP
- Early Stages "Bootleg" release/demo of early Soul Of The Rainbow material - CDr
- The Sky's Run Into The Sea (Kranky, 2003) - CD/LP

=== EPs and singles ===
- The Social Club Nº 8 (The Social Registry, 2007) - 7" Single
- Growing/Mark Evan Burden split (Zum) - CD
- Growing/Mark Evan Burden split (This Generation Tapes) - EP
- Dry Drunk On Woman (Megablade/Nail In The Coffin) - 7" Single
- Dry Drunk On Woman (Nail In The Coffin) - CDr

=== Compilations ===
- Secrets And Sounds (Animal Disguise) - CD

=== Cassettes ===
- ANNODOMINI - Demo under the name 1000 AD
- Fear of Life/Death - self-released
- Five Patterns - self-released
- Five Patterns & Fear Of Life/Death (Animal Disguise) reissue of both self-released tapes in one package.
- Above/ Below Sea Level (Animal Disguise) - double cassette meant to be played simultaneously on separate stereos; limited edition
- USA - self-released
- Live Series I (Tapeblade)
- Live Series II (Tapeblade)
- Live Series III (Tapeblade)
- Live Series IV (Tapeblade)
- Live Series V (Tapeblade)
- BBC Session - Self Released. Later re released in the Live Series tapes.

=== Video ===
- Modern Practical Incantations - self-released
