= Hazed Dream =

2011 studio album by Psychic Ills

Studio album by Psychic Ills
- Released: October 18, 2011
- Recorded: 2011
- Length: 40:55
- Label: Sacred Bones

Psychic Ills chronology
Mirror Eye (2009)	Hazed Dream (2011)	One Track Mind (2013)

Hazed Dream is the third studio album by American rock band Psychic Ills. It was released on October 18, 2011, by Sacred Bones Records.

== Critical reception ==
Professional ratings
Aggregate scores
Source	Rating
Metacritic	67/100
Review scores
Source	Rating
AllMusic	3.5/5 stars
Blurt	8/10
Consequence	C−
Pitchfork	5.9/10

At Metacritic, which assigns a weighted rating out of 100 to reviews from mainstream critics, the album has an average score of 67 based on 4 reviews, indicating "generally favorable reviews". Alex Young of Consequence described Hazed Dream as a "plodding, dusty kind of psych that comes standard with phased guitars, droning organs, and a slurred and sparse percussive backbone."

== Track listing ==
Hazed Dream track listing
No.	Title	Length
1.	"Midnight Moon"	3:49
2.	"Mind Daze"	3:38
3.	"Incense Head"	4:14
4.	"Mexican Wedding"	3:21
5.	"That's Alright"	3:55
6.	"Ring Finger"	4:08
7.	"Travelin' Man"	3:43
8.	"Sungaze"	4:08
9.	"Dream Repetition"	2:01
10.	"I'll Follow You Through the Floor"	4:47
11.	"Same Old Song"	3:10
Total length:		40:55
