= Sum/One =

Professional ratings
Review scores
Source	Rating
Allmusic	4/5 stars
Clash	7/10
Consequence of Sound	C-
The Guardian	3/5 stars
Loud and Quiet	3/10
NME	6/10
Paste	8.7/10
Pitchfork Media	6.8/10
Popmatters	6/10
Slant Magazine	2.5/5 stars

Sum/One is an album by Beedeegee.
