= God's Money (album) =

Album by Gang Gang Dance

Studio album by Gang Gang Dance
- Released: 2005
- Genre: Experimental rock; worldbeat; sound collage
- Length: 39:01
- Label: The Social Registry

Gang Gang Dance chronology
Gang Gang Dance (2004)	God's Money (2005)	RAWWAR (2007)

Professional ratings
Review scores
Source	Rating
Allmusic	link
The A.V. Club	(favourable) link
Chart	link
Pitchfork Media	(8.6/10) link
Tiny Mix Tapes	link

God's Money is the third studio album by American experimental music band Gang Gang Dance, released in 2005 on The Social Registry. It received positive reviews from critics.

== Track listing ==
1. "God's Money I (Percussion)" – 1:58
2. "Glory in Itself/Egyptian" – 5:28
3. "Egowar" – 8:50
4. "Untitled (Piano)" – 3:19
5. "God's Money V" – 3:39
6. "Before My Voice Fails" – 5:21
7. "God's Money VII" – 3:16
8. "Nomad for Love (Cannibal)" – 4:50
9. "God's Money IX" – 2:19
