= Mike Bones =

American singer-songwriter

- Origin: New York City
- Genres: Singer-songwriter
- Years active: 2006–present
- Label: The Social Registry
- Members: Mike Strallow

Mike Bones is the stage name of Mike Strallow, a New York City–based guitarist singer-songwriter who established himself as one of the top guitarists on the New York underground/independent scene for his work with Soldiers of Fortune, Damon McMahon, Lizzie Trulie, and the Mighty Flashlight. He emerged as a solo artist under the name Mike Bones.

== Background ==
Born in 1980 and raised in Bloomfield, New Jersey, Strallow began learning to play guitar when he was six years old, though he didn't have an instrument of his own until he was ten. In his late teens, Strallow moved to New York City and began immersing himself in the city's music scene while honing his guitar technique. Strallow had been playing guitar with a handful of groups before he began taking his first steps as a songwriter, influenced by American roots artists such as Skip James and Hank Williams as well as the angst-filled confessions of Leonard Cohen. Strallow started putting his songs to tape during a stay in Memphis with friends from the band Lucero, but these early sessions went unreleased and it was only in the summer of 2006 that Strallow began serious work on his first full-length album. Setting up at a Brooklyn recording studio owned by members of the band Oneida, Strallow's sessions included appearances by Parker Kindred of Antony and the Johnsons, Patrick Sullivan of Oakley Hall, El-P sideman Wilder Zoby, and Brad Truax of White Magic and Home; for these recordings, Strallow purposefully deemphasized his guitar work to give his lyrics greater room. Rather than release the project under his own name, Strallow used the moniker Mike Bones, a nickname from his childhood. The first Mike Bones album, The Sky Behind the Sea, was released by the independent label The Social Registry in the fall of 2007.

== Discography ==
- The Sky Behind The Sea (2007)
- What I Have Left 7-inch (2008)
- A Fool For Everyone (2009)
