= Artanker Convoy =

American psychedelic rock band

Artanker Convoy is an American psychedelic rock group formed in 2000 and was one of the first bands to sign to the Brooklyn experimental music label, The Social Registry.

== History ==
Drummer/record producer Artanker and bassist Joe Fiorentino played with James Murphy in the short lived Jinx Clambake Explosion in 1992, and then went on to form the 90s acid bubblegum group Stratotanker. Artanker assembled the Convoy when the controversial Brazilian choreographer Maura Baiocchi contacted Artanker about composing music for modern dance pieces. Artanker brought Stratotanker members Joe Fiorentino and Chris Seeds back together, and recruited Art Lavis from Princess Superstar, Jake Oas (a.k.a. "Koozie") from the Low Down Dirty D.A.W.G.S. and tabla player Jon Warren. In 2012, the Convoy was dealt a devastating blow when founding member and bass player Joe Fiorentino died in his sleep due to a congenital heart condition on the verge of a new album release. Convoy remained on hiatus through early 2014, when longtime musician friend Cezhan Ambrose (Spalding Rockwell/Princess Superstar/Black Jack & the Maniacs) assumed bass responsibilities.

== Early work ==
The Convoy created several compositions for Taanteatro and performed with the company at the Mercosur Theater Festival in Cordoba, Argentina as well as at Chashama in New York City. Artanker then formed the interdisciplinary performance art company MUX with experimental video producers Andrew Personette, Bruna De Araujo, and Gene Trotsky, and New York City modern dancer and choreographer Nicole Wolcott. Artanker Convoy appeared exclusively with MUX for most of 2005–2007.

== Releases ==
The Social Registry released Convoy's debut 12” “Artanker Convoy Presents Ocean Parkway,” in 2004 and the LP “Mature Fantasy” the following year. Time Out New York was the first to compare the releases to 1970s era Miles Davis, and these comparisons grew more frequent with release of the next LP, “Cozy Endings,” in 2007. After the release of Cozy Endings, reviewers also began to compare Convoy to Can and Don Cherry.

== Performances and other activities ==
Due to the large scale of Convoy's performances, which came to include multiple video projectionists and modern dancers, Convoy rarely performs outside of New York. However, in early 2008 the band toured the UK.

Convoy has also composed and recorded soundtracks for animated short films, including one for Sesame Street, and the unreleased Christopher Walken/Amanda Peet/Sharon Stone film “Five Dollars a Day.”
