= Eye Contact (Gang Gang Dance album) =

Studio album by Gang Gang Dance
- Released: May 2011
- Recorded: May 2010
- Genre: Electronic; experimental; synth-pop; worldbeat
- Length: 47:55
- Label: 4AD
- Producer: Gang Gang Dance; Sean Maffucci

Gang Gang Dance chronology
Saint Dymphna (2008)	Eye Contact (2011)	Kazuashita (2018)

Professional ratings
Aggregate scores
Source	Rating
AnyDecentMusic?	8.1/10
Metacritic	83/100
Review scores
Source	Rating
AllMusic	4/5 stars
The A.V. Club	B
The Guardian	4/5 stars
The Irish Times	4/5 stars
Mojo	4/5 stars
NME	8/10
Pitchfork	8.5/10
Rolling Stone	3.5/5 stars
Spin	8/10
Uncut	4/5 stars

Eye Contact is the fifth studio album by American experimental music band Gang Gang Dance, released on May 10, 2011. It is the collective's first album to be released under the 4AD banner.

The record is their first and final to feature Jesse Lee handling drumming duties after original drummer Tim Dewit's 2008 departure. Eye Contact also consists of contributions from bassist Tim Koh of Ariel Pink's Haunted Graffiti and Alexis Taylor of alternative dance / synth-pop collective Hot Chip.

Stereogum placed the album at number 6 on its list of the "Top 50 albums of 2011". Uncut placed the album at number 22 on its list while Pitchfork placed the album at 25.

== Musical style ==
Eye Contact follows 2008's lauded Saint Dymphna, which consisted of genres ranging from dance-rock to dubstep to grime.

Eye Contact would follow in the avant-garde footsteps the group had become known and applauded for. However, its accessibility would be heightened more than that of its predecessors, being dubbed as the collective's 'first true "pop" record'. The "murky layers of production, angular, abstract dark corners, and black holes of space and rawness" defining the past Gang Gang Dance works had departed, in the opinion of AllMusic's Thom Jurek.

In contrast, Pitchfork's Aaron Leitko did not consider it pop, but rather "the stuff of pop records collected, melted down, and then dribbled Jackson Pollock-style onto a canvas."

== Track listing ==
No.	Title	Length
1.	"Glass Jar"	11:22
2.	"∞"	1:03
3.	"Adult Goth"	6:16
4.	"Chinese High"	5:13
5.	"MindKilla"	5:17
6.	"∞∞"	1:34
7.	"Romance Layers" (featuring Alexis Taylor)	4:25
8.	"Sacer"	5:40
9.	"∞∞∞"	1:25
10.	"Thru and Thru"	5:40

== Personnel ==
Gang Gang Dance

- Lizzi Bougatsos – lead vocals
- Brian Degraw – keyboards
- Josh Diamond – guitar
- Taka Imamura – visual artwork
- Jesse Lee – drums

Additional personnel

- Tim Koh – bass guitar on #4
- Alexis Taylor – additional vocals on #7
