= Gang Gang Dance =

American band

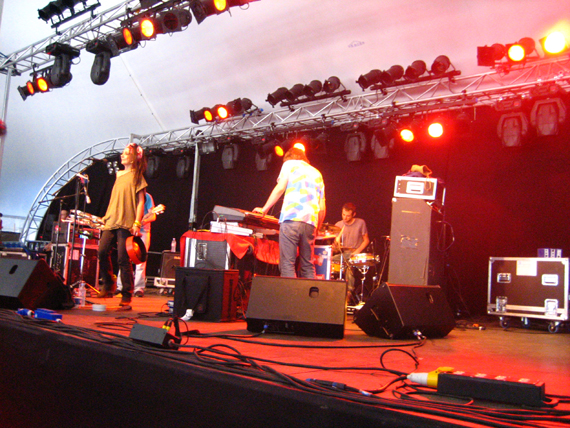
- Gang Gang Dance performing in 2006

Background information
- Origin: New York City, U.S.
- Genres: Experimental, neo-psychedelia, worldbeat, dance-pop, electronic, indie rock
- Years active: 2001–present
- Labels: 4AD (current); The Social Registry; Warp; FUSETRON; Young (former)
- Members: Lizzi Bougatsos; Brian DeGraw; Josh Diamond; Taka Imamura
- Past members: Tim DeWit; Jesse Lee; Nathan Maddox; Doug Shaw
- Website: ganggangdance.com

Gang Gang Dance is an American band based in Manhattan, New York City. They are known for their distinctive sound which blends elements of psych-rock, ambient electronics, hip-hop, and Eastern music influences with the vocals of singer Lizzi Bougatsos. They have released several albums to critical praise, including Saint Dymphna (2008) and Eye Contact (2011). They are currently signed to the British label 4AD and previously recorded on labels such as Warp and The Social Registry.

== Career ==
Gang Gang Dance were formed in 2001 by keyboardist Brian DeGraw and drummer Tim DeWit, who first met in Washington, D.C. in 1993 and played in The Cranium. In 1998 the band released one album, A New Music for a New Kitchen on the Slowdime record label, which was described as "deconstructionist anti-music" and "insane, rule-breaking almost-noise", before breaking up. While on tour, DeGraw and DeWit met vocalist Liz Bougatsos (who joined them some years later), a frontwoman for an experimental New York band called Russia at the time. After The Cranium's breakup, DeGraw and DeWit relocated to New York City. DeGraw, along with guitarist Josh Diamond (later a Gang Gang Dance member too), performed in film director Harmony Korine's experimental project SSAB Songs.

In the early 2000s, DeGraw, DeWit, and Diamond formed Death and Dying, a short-lived band which soon, with the addition of Bougatsos and vocalist Nathan Maddox, evolved into Gang Gang Dance. In August 2002, Maddox, aged 25, died after being struck by lightning during a thunderstorm he was watching from the rooftop of a building in Manhattan's Chinatown. As a four-some, the band signed to Brooklyn label The Social Registry record label in 2004 to release the debut Revival of the Shittest album, followed by Hillulah EP (2005) and the third album God's Money (2005). Critics praised Bougatsos' unique approach. As Jo-Anne Green of AllMusic argued, "without her, God's Money would be a haunting journey through an ever-shifting electronic world... With her, the musical experience is far more difficult, as she cuts across the grain of the atmospheres and moods, suggesting the group will never sit comfortably in any niche but its own." In 2007, The Social Registry released Retina Riddim DVD/CD, a year later Saint Dymphna followed, marking a shift in the band's sound "...toward employing grime as compositional elements, while relying on more structured electronic workouts in general."

In August 2008, the band conducted the Brooklyn chapter of 88 Boadrum. A month later, the fourth album, Saint Dymphna, was released to positive reviews. On July 22, 2009, Gang Gang Dance played on a Russian Ferry in Japanese waters with their friends the Boredoms during an eclipse.

In 2010, the band received publishing royalties from British group Florence and the Machine. Members of Gang Gang Dance noticed that a line ('how quickly the glamour fades') in "Rabbit Heart (Raise It Up)" was lifted from their song "House Jam" and approached Florence and the Machine's label who acknowledged that infringement had occurred. Florence Welch, the band's singer and main songwriter, had openly talked about her love of the band in interviews prior to the discovery, and Gang Gang Dance are thanked in the liner notes of copies of the album printed before they contacted her management. Welch claims she always intended the band to be credited and receive royalties; she also noted the fact the band never received royalties until the mistake was highlighted was an error on the part of her management.

In 2010, Gang Gang Dance signed with British label 4AD. A limited-edition EP Kamakura, recorded in 2007, was also released via Latitudes in 2010.

In 2011, they released the album Eye Contact, which received wide acclaim, chosen as "Best New Music" by Pitchfork who also named it as one of their top albums of the year as did New York Magazine, and The Guardian. Tracks off of the albums were remixed by Lee "Scratch" Perry, Nguzunguzu, and gg.

The band was chosen by Animal Collective to perform at their All Tomorrow's Parties festival in May 2011. In 2011 they also performed at Planeta Terra Festival in São Paulo, Meredith Fest in Australia, Le Guess Who Festival in Utrecht, Teatro Fru Fru in Mexico, the Filter Block Party in LA, and Pitchfork Festival in Chicago.

In 2013, founding member, Brian DeGraw, released a solo album under the moniker bEEdEEgEE. The album was called Sum/One and came out on 4AD.

On April 10, 2018, Gang Gang Dance announced their first album in seven years, Kazuashita, and shared the first single "Lotus". The album was released on June 22 through 4AD.

Doug Shaw, the band's bassist, died on 26 May 2026, following a stroke.

== Discography ==
Studio albums

- Revival of the Shittest (The Social Registry) (2004)
- Gang Gang Dance (FUSETRON) (2004)
- God's Money (The Social Registry) (2005)
- Saint Dymphna (The Social Registry/Warp) (2008)
- Eye Contact (4AD) (2011)
- Kazuashita (4AD) (2018)

EPs

- Hillulah (The Social Registry) (2005)
- RAWWAR (The Social Registry/Young) (2007)
- Kamakura (Latitudes) (2010)

DVDs

- Retina Riddim (with CD) (The Social Registry) (2007)
