= The Social Registry =

American record label

The Social Registry is a record label based in Brooklyn, New York that was started in 2003. It was voted "Best New Record label" in The Village Voice's Best of New York issue in 2004.

== Artists ==
Artanker Convoy, Blood Lines, Blood on the Wall, Christy & Emily, Douglas Armour, Electroputas, Gang Gang Dance, Growing, Highlife, Jah Division, Mas Ysa, Mike Bones, Psychic Ills, Samara Lubelski, Sian Alice Group, Zs

== Discography ==
Catalog number	Artist	Title	Release date	Physical Formats
TSR080	Nymph	Nymph	09/28/2010	CD
TSR079	TBA	TBA	TBA	TBA
TSR078	Zs	New Slaves	05/11/2010	CD/2xLP
TSR077	Highlife	Best Bless	09/28/2010	CD/LP
TSR076	TBA	TBA	TBA	TBA
TSR075	Psychic Ills	Catoptric	06/22/2010	12-Inch LP
TSR074	Sian Alice Group	Troubled, Shaken Etc.	08/04/2009	CD/2xLP
TSR073	Mike Bones	What I Have Left	02/03/2008	7-Inch Single
TSR072	Mike Bones	A Fool For Everyone	02/03/2008	CD/LP
TSR071	Zs	Music Of The Modern White	07/07/2009	12-Inch EP
TSR070	TBA	TBA	TBA	TBA
TSR069	I.U.D.	The Proper Sex	03/24/2008	LP
TSR068	Sian Alice Group	Remix	01/20/2009	12-Inch EP
TSR067	TBA	TBA	TBA	TBA
TSR066	Psychic Ills	Mirror Eye	01/20/2009	CD/LP
TSR065	Growing	All The Way	09/11/2008	CD/LP
TSR064	Growing	Lateral	02/19/2008	CDEP/12-Inch EP
TSR063	Sian Alice Group	Dusk Line	06/17/2008	CDEP/12-Inch EP
TSR062	Sian Alice Group	59.59	02/19/2008	CD/2xLP
TSR061	TBA	TBA	TBA	TBA
TSR060	Blood On The Wall	Liferz	01/22/2008	CD/LP
TSR059	I.U.D.	Daddy	03/24/2008	7-Inch Single
TSR058	Growing	The Social Club Nº 8	12/04/2007	7-Inch Single
TSR057	Kid Kishore	The Social Club Nº 9	03/04/2008	7-Inch Single
TSR056	Samara Lubelski	Parallel Suns	10/09/2007	CD/LP
TSR055	Metabolismus	The Social Club Nº 7	01/22/2008	7-Inch Single
TSR054	Metabolismus	The Social Club Nº 7	01/22/2008	7-Inch Single
TSR053	Octis	The Social Club Nº 6	10/09/2007	7-Inch Single
TSR052	Metabolismus	The Social Club Nº 7	01/22/2008	7-Inch Single
TSR051	Douglas Armour	The Light Of A Golden Day, The Arms Of The Night	05/20/2008	CD/LP
TSR050	Gang Gang Dance	St. Dymphna	10/21/2008	CD/LP
TSR049	Messages	The Social Club Nº 3	08/07/2007	7-Inch Single
TSR047	TBA	TBA	TBA	TBA
TSR046	Mike Bones	The Sky Behind The Sea	10/09/2007	CD
TSR045	Christy & Emily	Gueen's Head	08/07/2007	CD
TSR044	TBA	TBA	TBA	TBA
TSR043	Sian Alice Group	The Social CLub Nº 2	06/19/2007	7-Inch Single
TSR042	Douglas Armour	The Social Club Nº 4	08/07/2007	7-Inch Single
TSR041	I.U.D.	The Social Club Nº 5	09/11/2007	7-Inch Single
TSR040	Interference	Interference	12/08/2009	2xLP
TSR039	TBA	TBA	TBA	TBA
TSR038	Jena Malone	The Social Club Nº1	05/22/2007	7 Inch Single
TSR037	VietNam	TBA	TBA	12 Inch LP
TSR036	TBA	TBA	TBA	TBA
TSR035	VietNam	EP Nº2	07/24/2007	12 Inch LP
TSR034	TBA	TBA	0/0/00	TBA
TSR033	Gang Gang Dance	Retina Riddim	05/22/2007	DVD+CD
TSR032	Psychic Ills	Early Violence	12/05/2006	CD
TSR031	VietNam	EP Nº1	05/22/2007	12 Inch LP
TSR030	Gang Gang Dance	RAWAR	09/11/2007	CDEP/12 Inch LP
TSR029	Artanker Convoy	Cozy Endings	05/22/2007	DVD+CD
TSR028	Telepathe	Sinister Militia	06/19/2007	12 Inch EP
TSR027	TK Webb	Phantom Parade	11/21/2006	CD
TSR026	Bloodlines	XX	10/09/2007	CDR
TSR025	Telepathe	Farewell Forrest	CDEP	
TSR024	Psychic Ills	Dins	02/07/2006	CD/LP
TSR023	Interference	Excerpt	03/20/2006	12-Inch LP
TSR022	Samara Lubelski	Spectacular Of Passages	11/22/2005	CD
TSR021	Bloodlines	Only The Holy	0/0/00	CDEP
TSR020	Blood On The Wall	Awesomer	0/0/00	CD/LP
TSR019	Gang Gang Dance	God's Money	04/05/2005	CD/LP
TSR018	Gang Gang Dance	Hillulah	08/16/2005	CDR/CDEP
TSR017	Samara Lubelski	The Fleeting Skies	0/0/00	CD
TSR016	Artanker Convoy	Mature Fantasy	0/0/00	CD
TSR015	TK Webb	KCK	CD	0/0/0000
TSR014	Psychic Ills	Mental Violence II	12/06/2005	12 Inch EP
TSR013	Electroputas	3	10/09/2004	CD, LP
TSR012	Jäh Division	Dub Will Tear Us Apart	11/12/2004	12-Inch EP
TSR011	Gang Gang Dance	Revival Of The Shittest	09/06/2004	LP
SR011	Gang Gang Dance	Revival Of The Shittest	10/23/2003	CDR
SR010	Blood On The Wall	Blood On The Wall	05/04/2004	CD, LP
SR009	Artanker Convoy	Ocean Parkway EP	12/05/2003	12 Inch EP
SR008	Electroputas	Piano Blooms EP	07/02/2003	12 Inch EP
SR007	Ghost Exits	Cincinnati Riot Blues EP	07/02/2003	12 Inch EP
SR006	Hall Of Fame	Paradise Now	07/11/2004	CD, LP
SR005	Painting Soldiers	Horizon Fall EP	12/05/2003	12 Inch EP
SR004	Icewater Scandle	No Handle	04/06/2004	CD/2XLP
SR003	AM Radio	Live At The Seawitch 06.21.2001	10/23/2003	CDR
SR002	Janisary Music	Janisary Music	10/23/2003	CDR
SR001	AM Radio	"Self Titled EP"	07/02/2002	CDEP
