= Kid Canaveral discography =

- Studio albums: 3
- EPs: 2
- Singles: 14

The discography of the Scottish alternative rock band Kid Canaveral consists of three studio albums, fourteen singles, and one extended play (EP).

== Studio albums ==
Year	Title	Label
2010	Shouting at Wildlife: Release date: 5 July 2010; Format: Digipak CD, digital download	Straight to Video Records
2011	Shouting at Wildlife (re-release): Release date: 25 July 2011; Format: LP, CD	Fence Records
2013	Now That You Are a Dancer: Release date: 4 March 2013; Format: LP, CD, DD	Fence Records; Lost Map Records
2016	Faulty Inner Dialogue: Release date: 29 July 2016; Format: LP, CD, DD	Lost Map Records

== Singles ==
Year	Release date	Title	Album	Label	Format
2007	5 March	"Smash Hits"	Shouting at Wildlife	Straight to Video Records	7" vinyl, digital download
2008	22 June	"Couldn't Dance"	Shouting at Wildlife	Straight to Video Records	7" vinyl, digital download
2008	27 October	"Second Time Around"	Non-album single	Straight to Video Records	7" vinyl, digital download
2008	15 December	"I Don't Have the Heart for This"	Non-album single	Straight to Video Records	7" vinyl, digital download
2010	31 May	"You Only Went Out to Get Drunk Last Night"	Shouting at Wildlife	Straight to Video Records	Cassette, digital download
2011	11 July	"And Another Thing!!"	Shouting at Wildlife	Fence Records	Cassette, digital download
2011	31 October	"Homerun and a Vow/Nowhere Near Half Done" (as King Creosote and Kid Canaveral)	Non-album single	Fence Records	7" vinyl, T-shirt with digital download
2012	17 December	"Low Winter Sun"	Now That You Are a Dancer	Fence Records	7" vinyl, digital download
2013	11 February	"The Wrench"	Now That You Are a Dancer	Fence Records	Promo only
2013	28 October	"A Compromise"	Now That You Are a Dancer	Lost Map Records	Postcard, digital download
2014	14 February	"Who Would Want to be Loved?"	Now That You Are a Dancer	Lost Map Records	10" pink heart-shaped vinyl, digital download
2014	9 July	"Skeletons"	Now That You Are a Dancer	Lost Map Records	Postcard, digital download
2016	29 April	"First We Take Dumbarton"	Faulty Inner Dialogue	Lost Map Records	Postcard, digital download
2016	22 July	"Tragic Satellite"	Faulty Inner Dialogue	Lost Map Records	Promo only

== Extended plays ==
Year	Date	Title	Label	Format
2009	19 October	Left and Right	Straight to Video Records	Cassette, digital download
2015	11 December	Lost Cat #6 - Lost Catmas EP	Lost Map Records	Cassette, digital download

== Compilations ==
- Limbo Live Volume 01 (limited CD and digital download, 23 April 2009. MGM-001) - contains a live version of the track "Second Time Around". Recorded live at The Voodoo Rooms, Edinburgh, Scotland on 13 December 2008
- The Inside Track (digital download, 4 August 2010) - charity album for Waverley Care featuring "Stretching the Line"

== Other ==
- Good Morning (free Christmas digital download, 24 Dec 2009. STV-006)
