= From Scotland with Love =

Album by King Creosote

Studio album by King Creosote
- Released: 21 July 2014
- Recorded: Chem19 Studios; Blantyre, Scotland
- Genre: Folk
- Label: Domino
- Producer: David McAulay

King Creosote chronology
Sure & Steadfast (2013)	From Scotland with Love (2014)	Astronaut Meets Appleman (2016)

From Scotland with Love
- Directed by: Virginia Heath
- Produced by: Grant Keir; Heather Croall; Mark Atkin
- Music by: King Creosote
- Release date: 22 June 2014 (Scotland)
- Country: United Kingdom
- Language: English

From Scotland with Love is a documentary feature film produced by Grant Kier, Heather Croall, and Mark Atkin and directed by Virginia Heath. The soundtrack was an original studio album by Scottish singer-songwriter King Creosote (Kenny Anderson).

The film was commissioned as part of the Cultural Festival accompanying the 2014 Glasgow Commonwealth Games. It was screened with live musical accompaniment on Glasgow Green on 31 July 2014. It was produced by Faction North, Crossover, National Library of Scotland and Scottish Screen Archive in association with BBC Scotland and Creative Scotland.

The album was produced by David McAulay and released on 21 July 2014 on Domino Recording Company.

Regarding the album, and its film counterpart, Anderson stated: "It's basically just looking at ourselves in the past – it's like looking at your grandparents' or your great grandparents' generation goofing about, just doing what they're doing. But you have to remember that it wasn't the past for them - they were right at the cutting edge of time like we are now."

Released to widespread critical acclaim, the album reached number twenty-one in the UK Albums Chart; Creosote's highest-charting album to date. The album also peaked at number one on the UK Record Store Chart, and at number three on the Scottish Albums Chart.

== Background ==
Director Virginia Heath was commissioned to create a documentary film, featuring Scottish archive footage, to coincide with the 2014 Glasgow Commonwealth Games. Kenny Anderson was subsequently approached to craft its soundtrack, whilst recovering from a broken leg, looking forward to the birth of his child, and experiencing the potential collapse of his long-running record label, Fence. Initially hesitant, Anderson noted "I'm traditionally pretty bad when there's a deadline. It's not that I wouldn't deliver something, it's just that I didn't think it would be any good. They kept the Commonwealth Games out of the conversation for a while. I think they thought that once I heard the C-word I would back out all together."

With Anderson on board, he stated: "I haven't really worked with a director before, but I've had directors get in touch and ask if they can use certain songs. That's one thing when a director has their film made and they connect with something that you've written, but it's completely different when a songwriter watches a film and says, 'Oh right, I've got the song for that. [...] I just went for it and I wrote songs and passed them back to Virginia. She would go back and try to find footage that would fit it or she would reject things outright because they were too literal. So I had to hope that what I'd seen in these short films was worthy of writing a song about – and if I'd gone off piste a bit she'd be able to go back and find things that didn't make certain lyrics stand out like a sore thumb."

== Film ==
The film is a 75-minute documentary created entirely from archive film material from the National Library of Scotland and Scottish Screen Archive. It is purely visual with no voiceover - only a musical soundtrack.

Heath pitched for the project alongside her partner Grant Keir and Heather Croall and Mark Atkin in response to an open call for submissions. The team took inspiration from the similar combination of archive footage and live scoring by contemporary musicians (in that case, British Sea Power) on From the Sea to the Land Beyond that had also been produced by Heather Croall and Mark Atkin.

On choosing to work with King Creosote, Heath said: "We came to Kenny because we felt he had a great storytelling ability in his lyrics. We knew that to get across some of the complexity of the sequences we wanted, we needed someone who could translate feelings and stories into song."

Heath researched this material over several months, watching hundreds of films in the archive. "The themes are broadly love and loss, work and leisure, resistance and immigration, fighting for justice," she says. "The big themes of the 20th century, mixed with a bit of fun and lightheartedness. It’s a universal story but with a strongly Scottish flavour, although we did try and avoid the usual clichés about the country."

Heath sent Anderson a storyboard broken down into three-minute sections showing the different storylines she wanted to pursue. She created fragments of visual material, which he responded to with music. The visuals were returned to the editing room for further development and then sent back again.

It explores themes of love, loss, resistance, migration, work and play, referencing heavy industry, Scotland's shipbuilding past, the fishing industry, war, urbanisation and emigration. It also celebrates community, a good night out and a holiday by the seaside.

"I wanted to make a film about ordinary people," Heath said. "What really interested me was ordinary people's lives and the way people made things, were proud of making things, the sense of community."

Vignettes include miners smoking, couples skating on frozen rivers, a sandwich-board boy advertising Auchtermuchty Flower Show, shipworkers, children being drilled in gasmask wearing, a bombed-out classroom, the old industrial banks of the Clyde, trams going to Scotstoun and Partick, milkmen, cranes, the dead landmark of Ravenscraig steel works, tanks in George Square, and dancing at the Barrowlands.

The accompanying music is judged to go with the images on screen, for example a playground motif for girls rope-skipping down the street, jaunty music for trips to the seaside, and racier sounds for a sequence on dating and nightlife.

The film premiered on BBC Scotland on Sunday 22 June 2014. There were a series of live open-air screenings during the Commonwealth Games.

== Recording ==
After a composing session in a studio near Loch Fyne, From Scotland with Love was recorded at Chem19 Studios, in Blantyre, Scotland, with producer David McAulay. The album also features additional production from The Delgados' Paul Savage, who had previously worked with Anderson on his studio albums, Flick the Vs (2009) and That Might Well Be It, Darling (2013).

The album also features musical contributions from Admiral Fallow's Louis Abbott and Kevin Brolly, Meursault's Pete Harvey and Kate Miguda, and The Delgados' Emma Pollock.

== Writing and composition ==
Upon the album's release, Kenny Anderson noted that there are references to his mother and father throughout From Scotland with Love, stating: "My dad's in this album a lot. There are a lot of songs on it that have little jokes in them for me, or for my dad. [...] [The song], "Leaf Piece", that comes from my mum, that's what she always called it – 'Don't forget your leaf piece!' It's a bag of crisps, or an apple, or a cheese piece. It was a big thing, it was the first break in the day when you were [harvesting potatoes]. You couldn't wait to get your leaf piece. I think it's maybe meant to be 'leave piece' originally – I wonder if it got Anderson-ised."

Regarding the track "For One Night Only", Anderson stated: "It was originally called "Fighting and Shagging". I found that one really hard to write. I knew we needed this upbeat, going-out song, but I can't do that. [...] I'm sure people go out a lot more now than they used to. Even my gran's generation, they'd have a sherry at New Year and that would be it. So I was thinking, big nights out must have been few and far between, and when you did go out, there would be no holding back. If your drunk character – because everyone's got one – could only come out once a year, it would be hugely exaggerated."

=== Reworkings ===
The track "Miserable Strangers" features a reprise of the chorus from "678"; a song which previously appeared on the studio album KC Rules OK (2005). A full re-recording of "678" appears during the course of the film, and is included on the deluxe edition of From Scotland from Love.

The song "Pauper's Dough" is a reworking of the song "Harper's Dough", which previously appeared on 12 O'Clock on the Dot (2000). Anderson noted: "The original sentiment I had for "Harper's Dough" was really personal – it was just, you know, can you not pull yourself up by your own bootstraps. It was never a protest song, but now it is. It's one of the most powerful bits in the film. And of course, you can make these big sweeping sentiments – Bono does it all the time – but I don't. [...] Before it was about how I felt like the worst person ever and had to do something about myself; now it's about changing the world. Wow. And I can't take credit for that, that's down to [director] Virginia [Heath] – the footage she used and gave me to write from."

== Reception ==
=== Critical response ===
Professional ratings
Aggregate scores
Source	Rating
Metacritic	81/100
Review scores
Source	Rating
AllMusic	4/5 stars
Clash	8/10
DIY	4/5 stars
Drowned in Sound	8/10
NME	6/10
The Observer	4/5 stars

From Scotland with Love received widespread critical acclaim upon its release. At Metacritic, which assigns a normalized rating out of 100 to reviews from mainstream critics, the album has received an average score of 81, based on 9 reviews, indicating "universal acclaim".

== Track listing ==
From Scotland with Love track listing
No.	Title	Length
1.	"Something to Believe In"	3:14
2.	"Cargill"	3:16
3.	"Largs"	3:53
4.	"Miserable Strangers"	4:47
5.	"Leaf Piece"	5:32
6.	"For One Night Only"	4:09
7.	"Bluebell, Cockleshell, 123"	2:08
8.	"One Floor Down"	3:05
9.	"Crystal 8s"	2:12
10.	"Pauper’s Dough"	5:05
11.	"A Prairie Tale"	1:36

== Personnel ==
=== Musicians ===
- Kenny Anderson – vocals, accordion, wine glasses, acoustic guitar
- Derek O'Neil – piano, keyboards, organ
- Andy Robinson – drums, percussion
- Pete Macleod – bass
- David McAulay – electric and acoustic guitar, keyboards, synths, banjo, mandolin, percussion, backing vocals
- Kevin Brolly – clarinet
- Pete Harvey – cello, string arrangements
- Asher Zaccardelli – viola
- Emma Peebles – viola
- Kate Miguda – violin
- Paul Savage – drums
- Grant Keir – backing vocals, percussion
- Amy MacDougall – backing vocals
- Louis Abbott – backing vocals
- Jill O'Sullivan – backing vocals
- Jenny Reeve – backing vocals
- Emma Pollock – backing vocals
- Beatroute Street Singers – vocals

=== Recording personnel ===
- David McAulay – producer, mixing (2, 5, 7, 8, 9 and 11)
- Paul Savage – additional production, engineer, mixing (1, 3, 4, 6 and 10)
- Guy Davie – mastering

=== Artwork ===
- Matthew Cooper – design
- Paul J. Street – design
- Nick Phillips – logo design
- National Library of Scotland Scottish Screen Archive – photographs

== Charts ==
Chart performance for From Scotland with Love
Chart (2014)	Peak position
Scottish Albums (Official Charts)	3
UK Albums (Official Charts)	21
UK Independent Albums (Official Charts)	4
