= I Learned from the Gaels =

EP by King Creosote
- Released: 28 May 2012
- Genre: Indie folk
- Language: English
- Label: Domino
- Producer: Paul Savage

King Creosote chronology
Honest Words (2011)	I Learned from the Gaels (2012)	To Deal With Things (2012)

I Learned from the Gaels is an EP by Scottish indie folk artist King Creosote, released on 28 May 2012 on Domino Records. Produced by Paul Savage, the EP features full-band re-recordings of three tracks from Creosote's vinyl-only album, That Might Be It, Darling (2010), alongside a new track, "Little Man", featuring frequent collaborator Alan "Gummi Bako" Stewart on lead vocals.

The EP was subsequently compiled alongside follow-up EPs, To Deal With Things and It Turned Out for the Best, to create the full length-album, That Might Well Be It, Darling (2013).

== Reception ==
Professional ratings
Review scores
Source	Rating
Drowned in Sound	7/10

Drowned in Sound's Dan Cooper-Gavin gave the EP a positive review, stating: "While Diamond Mine often felt like a rather solitary record, I Learned From The Gaels is anything but, with its ramshackle glee a world away from Jon Hopkins’ atmospherics. But while it's not an EP that demands to be cherished, it's certainly one to savour regardless."

== Track listing ==
1. "Doubles Underneath"
2. "Near Star, Pole Star"
3. "Single Cheep"
4. "Little Man"
