= Bowlie Weekender =

1999 English music festival

Coordinates: 50.937°N 0.796°E

The Bowlie Weekender was a music festival curated by Belle & Sebastian at the Pontin's Holiday camp in Camber Sands, Sussex between Friday 23 and Sunday 25 April 1999.

The event was the inspiration for All Tomorrow's Parties, a music festival held at the same venue in Sussex every year from 2000 until it moved to Butlin's Minehead in 2006.

As part of the festival's tenth year celebrations, Belle & Sebastian was invited to curate an ATP weekend in December 2010, dubbed "Bowlie 2".

In August 2019, to celebrate the 20th anniversary of the first festival, Belle & Sebastian held a third festival, dubbed the "Boaty Weekender". Unlike the previous two festivals, the Boaty Weekender was held on the Norwegian Pearl cruise ship in the Mediterranean Sea (sailing from Barcelona) instead of Camber Sands.

== 1999 Lineup ==
The lineup included:

- AC Acoustics
- Amphetameanies
- Belle & Sebastian
- Broadcast
- Camera Obscura
- Cinema
- Cornelius
- Dean and Sean (Dean Wareham and Sean Eden of Luna)
- The Delgados
- The Divine Comedy
- The Flaming Lips
- Vic Godard
- Godspeed You! Black Emperor
- The Ladybug Transistor
- Looper
- Mercury Rev
- Mogwai
- The Pastels
- Salako
- Sleater-Kinney
- Snow Patrol
- Sodastream
- Jon Spencer Blues Explosion
- Teenage Fanclub
- V-Twin
- Bill Wells Octet

=== DJs ===
- Jarvis Cocker
- Tim Gane
- Steve Lamacq
- Steve Mackey
- Justin Spear
- Andrew Symington

== 2010 lineup ==
The 2010 lineup included:

- Belle & Sebastian
- Julian Cope
- The Vaselines
- Frightened Rabbit
- Field Music
- Howlin Rain
- Those Dancing Days
- Teenage Fanclub
- Isobel Campbell (with Mark Lanegan)
- The New Pornographers
- Vashti Bunyan
- Silver Columns
- Foals
- Crystal Castles
- Dean Wareham
- Mulatu Astatke
- Edwyn Collins
- Steve Mason
- Dirty Projectors
- The Zombies
- Jenny and Johnny
- Sons And Daughters
- Trembling Bells
- Abagail Grey
- The 1900s
- 1990s
- Best Coast
- The Phenomenal Handclap Band
- Amphetameanies
- Peter Parker
- Them Beatles
- Wild Beasts
- Camera Obscura
- Saint Etienne
- The Go! Team
- Laetitia Sadier
- Stevie Jackson
- Franz Ferdinand (Secret Band)
- Jane Weaver
- Daniel Kitson and Gavin Osborn
- Zoey Van Goey

== 2019 "Boaty Weekender" lineup ==
- Belle & Sebastian
- Mogwai
- Yo La Tengo
- Camera Obscura
- Teenage Fanclub
- Django Django
- Alvvays
- Buzzcocks (with Steve Diggle on vocals)
- Japanese Breakfast
- The Vaselines
- Honeyblood
- Hinds
- Kelly Lee Owens
- Nilüfer Yanya
- Whyte Horses
- Tracyanne & Danny
- Alex Edelman
- Propaganda
- Elizabeth Electra
- Campfire Social
- Wet Look
- Wojtek the Bear
