= Sea Glass (King Creosote album) =

Studio album by King Creosote
- Released: 2004
- Genre: Folk
- Label: Fence Collective

King Creosote chronology
Kenny and Beth's Musakal Boat Rides (2003)	Sea Glass (2004)	Rocket D.I.Y. (2005)

Sea Glass is the twenty-seventh studio album by King Creosote, released in 2004.

== Track listing ==
1. For The Last Time - Hello
2. Nooks
3. A Friday Night In New York
4. Little Heart
5. This Flaw That Flaw
6. At The WAL
7. My Favourite Girl In All The World
8. Running On Fumes
9. So Forlorn
10. Your Guess Who's In At The Core?
11. Comfort In Rum
12. Waterfall

== Personnel ==
- King Creosote – vocals, guitar, accordion
- Pip Dylan – lap steel
- Captain Geeko – percussion

== Critical reception ==
Sea Glass received positive reviews from critics. In a 2005 retrospective, The Scotsman praised the album's "haunting melodies and poetic songwriting," calling it "a hidden gem of the Scottish indie-folk scene."

A review by The List highlighted King Creosote's ability to "blend lo-fi textures with emotional intimacy," noting that the album "captures the raw charm of the Fife coastal towns where it was recorded."
