= John Taylor's Month Away / Missionary =

"John Taylor's Month Away"/"Missionary"

Single by King Creosote and Jon Hopkins

from the album Diamond Mine
- Released: 6 February 2012
- Recorded: 2011
- Genre: Folk, electronic
- Label: Domino

"John Taylor's Month Away"/"Missionary" is a double A-side single by King Creosote and Jon Hopkins, released on 6 February 2012 on Domino Records. The track, "John Taylor's Month Away", is taken from the duo's studio album, Diamond Mine, while "Missionary" originally appeared on Creosote's Kenny and Beth's Musakal Boat Rides. Hopkins and Creosote recorded a new version of the track, initially intended for inclusion on Diamond Mine, but ultimately removed it from the track listing.

The single was released on 7-inch vinyl and as a digital download.

== Track listing ==
1. "John Taylor's Month Away"
2. "Missionary"
