= Diamond Mine (King Creosote and Jon Hopkins album) =

Studio album by King Creosote and Jon Hopkins
- Released: 28 March 2011
- Studio: Cafe Music Studios, London
- Genre: Folk, folktronica
- Length: 32:11
- Language: English
- Label: Domino
- Producer: Jon Hopkins

King Creosote and Jon Hopkins chronology
That Might Be It, Darling (2010)	Diamond Mine (2011)	Honest Words (2011)

Singles from Diamond Mine
- 1. "John Taylor's Month Away"/"Missionary" Released: 6 February 2012

Diamond Mine is a collaborative studio album by Scottish singer-songwriter King Creosote and English electronica musician Jon Hopkins, released on 28 March 2011 through Domino Records. Inspired by the East Neuk of Fife, the album combines Creosote's songs with field recordings by Hopkins. Upon release, Creosote stated: "I really don't know what to do next, because, in some ways, I'm at that peak. I don't know where to go from here." The album was subsequently followed by the EP, Honest Words in September 2011, and the double a-side single, "John Taylor's Month Away"/"Missionary" in February 2012. A deluxe version of the album, titled Diamond Mine (Jubilee Edition), was released in 2012.

Diamond Mine was nominated for the 2011 Mercury Prize, with Creosote noting, "I wasn't expecting it at all. [...] There's been a lot of people in the media nailing their colours to the mast with this record, and that's quite encouraging – to know that we've got supporters, and a lot of them. I'm not expecting to win, but just to be on that list. This is something I've been on the outside of forever, and now here we are. It's all good. It makes up for not selling records, anyway!" The album sold 25,000 copies in 2011.

== Background and recording ==
Jon Hopkins had previously worked with King Creosote, producing the album, Bombshell (2007), and parts of Flick the Vs (2009). Diamond Mine took seven years to complete, with Creosote noting, "There was no goalpost in sight, it was just a song at a time." The album makes substantial use of musique concrète, with Jon Hopkins noting that the songs suggest "a romanticised version of Fife. A lot of it's about my first experience of going there – about my first Homegame, when I fell totally in love with the place, and with Fence Records. It's a bit like my dream version of life. [...] It's like the way Paris appears in Amélie."

Creosote stated that the songs, "The Racket They Made", "Admiral" and "Leslie", were initially planned for inclusion, but were subsequently abandoned and appear on other releases. "Bats in the Attic" was initially included on Creosote's performance-only album, My Nth Bit of Strange in Umpteen Years, with Hopkins noting, "You can hear the guitar part from his original version at the beginning, but I played it back through a mobile phone speaker simulation to decimate the quality, so that it retained its rhythm, but none of its notes, giving me freedom to change the chords of the song completely."

King Creosote recorded his vocals in London.

== Critical reception ==
Professional ratings
Aggregate scores
Source	Rating
Metacritic	78/100
Review scores
Source	Rating
AllMusic	4/5 stars
The Skinny	5/5 stars
Sputnikmusic	4.5/5 stars

The album was released to favourable reviews, with Creosote noting, "It feels like this is the beginning of something. And to feel that so far down the line, after putting out forty effing albums... oh my God! It means, I can still do this, it's not over." Bob Boilen of NPR Music in 2017 referred to the album as one of his favourite albums to have been released during his lifetime.

=== Accolades ===
Publication	Country	Accolade	Year	Rank
The Guardian	UK	The Best Albums of 2011	2011	13
Mojo	UK	Top 50 Albums of 2011	2011	14
The Skinny	UK	Albums of the Year	2011	5
Q	UK	50 Best Albums of 2011	2011	43
Uncut	UK	Top 50 Albums of 2011	2011	28

== Track listing ==
All tracks are written by Jon Hopkins and Kenny Anderson.

No.	Title	Length
1.	"First Watch"	2:37
2.	"John Taylor's Month Away"	6:32
3.	"Bats in the Attic"	3:43
4.	"Running on Fumes"	6:36
5.	"Bubble"	5:35
6.	"Your Own Spell"	3:51
7.	"Your Young Voice"	3:17

All tracks are written by Jon Hopkins and Kenny Anderson.

Jubilee Edition
No.	Title	Length
1.	"First Watch"	2:37
2.	"John Taylor's Month Away"	6:32
3.	"Bats in the Attic"	3:43
4.	"Running on Fumes"	6:36
5.	"Bubble"	5:35
6.	"Your Own Spell"	3:51
7.	"Your Young Voice"	3:17
8.	"Honest Words"	3:07
9.	"Aurora Boring Alias"	4:01
10.	"Bats in the Attic (Unravelled)"	3:25
11.	"Missionary"	2:57
12.	"Third Swan"	3:25
13.	"Starboard Home"	5:54
