= Rain Weekend =

Studio album by King Creosote
- Released: 1998
- Genre: Folk
- Label: Fence Collective

King Creosote chronology
Queen Of Brush County (1998)	Rain Weekend (1998)	Inner Crail To Outer Space (1998)

Rain Weekend is the second studio album by King Creosote, released in 1998.

== Track listing ==
1. Lonesome Pigeon
2. Oh No, It's Him!
3. Turps
4. My F.A.B. Tattoo
5. Injecticide
6. Crazy Paving
7. You Won't Regret It
8. Had I Been Around
9. If Ever
10. Try Again
11. Marigolden Growth
12. All Over Caroline
13. Wood Louse
14. Inner Crail to Outer Space
