= Psalm Clerk =

Studio album by King Creosote
- Released: 2003
- Genre: Folk
- Label: Fence Collective

King Creosote chronology
Now (Nearly 36) (2002)	Psalm Clerk (2003)	Ideal Rumpus Room Guide (2003)

Psalm Clerk is the twenty-fourth studio album by King Creosote, released in 2003.

== Track listing ==
1. One Angel No Wings
2. You Cuckoos
3. Plans Best Laid
4. Guess The Time
5. Clerkworks
6. Not One Bit Ashamed
7. Snakes From Single Socks
8. Figure 8
9. Who Did You Kill On The Way Up?
10. More Often Than Nought
11. Angela♥KC
12. Such Fine Deeds
13. Marianne♥KC
14. My Problem Is ...
15. Your Own Spell
16. Happy With Our Lot
17. Scoring You Twice
18. Love Your Present
19. Mercy Killing
20. No Contestvkwaing
21. Spy Attack
22. Musakal Lives
23. Buzz Off
