= Now That You Are a Dancer =

Studio album by Kid Canaveral
- Released: 4 March 2013
- Recorded: February–April, September 2012; 4th Street Studios, Glasgow, Scotland
- Genre: Indie pop, indie rock
- Length: 40:06
- Label: Lost Map Records; Fence
- Producer: Gal, Kid Canaveral

Kid Canaveral chronology
Shouting at Wildlife (2010)	Now That You Are a Dancer (2013)	Faulty Inner Dialogue (2016)

Singles from Now That You Are a Dancer
- 1. "Low Winter Sun" Released: 17 December 2012; 2. "A Compromise" Released: 18 October 2013; 3. "Who Would Want to be Loved?" Released: 14 February 2014

Now That You Are a Dancer is the second studio album by Scottish indie pop band Kid Canaveral, released on 4 March 2013 by Scottish independent label Fence Records. The album was preceded by the single "Low Winter Sun" on 17 December 2012 and promotional single "The Wrench" on 11 February 2013.Now That You Are a Dancer was nominated for the 2014 Scottish Album of the Year Award.

Professional ratings
Review scores
Source	Rating
The List	4/5 stars
Folk Radio UK	Very favourable
The Skinny	4/5 stars
Gold Flake Paint	Very favourable
BBC Radio Scotland - Tom Morton	Album of the Week
BBC Radio Scotland - Vic Galloway	Album of the Week
The Herald	Very favourable
STV Entertainment	Very favourable

== Track listing ==
All songs written by David MacGregor, except where noted.

1. "The Wrench" – 2:40
2. "Who Would Want to Be Loved?" – 3:07
3. "Breaking Up Is the New Getting Married" – 3:19
4. "Who's Looking at You, Anyway?" – 4:07
5. "Skeletons" (Kate Lazda) – 4:15
6. "Low Winter Sun" – 4:18
7. "What We Don't Talk About" – 3:53
8. "Without a Backing Track" (Lazda) – 3:23
9. "So Sad, So Young" – 3:15
10. "A Compromise" – 7:49

== Personnel ==
Kid Canaveral

- David MacGregor – vocals, guitar, keyboards, percussion
- Kate Lazda – vocals, guitar, keyboards
- Rose McConnachire – bass, vocals, keyboards
- Scott McMaster – drums, percussion

Additional personnel

- Gal – engineer, mixing, producer; programming on "Skeletons"
- Reuben Taylor – mastering
