= Radge Weekend Starts Here =

Studio album by King Creosote
- Released: 2001
- Genre: Folk
- Label: Fence Collective

King Creosote chronology
G (2000)	Radge Weekend Starts Here (2001)	King Creosote Says "Buy The Bazouki Hair Oil" (2000)

Radge Weekend Starts Here is the fifteenth studio album by King Creosote, released in 2001.

== Track listing ==
1. Laid When I'm Lucky
2. With Hindsight Blues
3. No Daddy
4. Handswashed
5. Creos'medleyote:Kir(kc)aldy / Fun(Kc)Rap / Fol(Kc)Ough
6. High Wire
7. Heaven Come Down Tonight
8. Life Of Lows
9. Far From Saving Grace
10. Mantra-Rap
11. Whats With The Frown?
12. Were I Not So Tired Xhösa
