= To Deal with Things =

To Deal With Things

EP by King Creosote
- Released: 27 August 2012
- Genre: Indie folk
- Language: English
- Label: Domino
- Producer: Paul Savage

King Creosote chronology
I Learned from the Gaels (2012)	To Deal With Things (2012)	It Turned Out for the Best (2012)

To Deal With Things is an EP by Scottish indie folk musician King Creosote, released on 27 August 2012 on Domino Records. Produced by Paul Savage, the EP features full band re-recordings of three tracks from Creosote's vinyl-only album, That Might Be It, Darling (2010). The EP's title is taken from the track, "Ankle Shackles".

The EP was subsequently compiled with I Learned from the Gaels (2012) and It Turned Out for the Best (2012) to create the full-length album, That Might Well Be It, Darling (2013).

== Reception ==
Professional ratings
Review scores
Source	Rating
This Is Fake DIY	8/10

This Is Fake DIY gave the EP a positive review. Praising the track, "Ankle Shackles", Hugh Morris wrote: "Ankle Shackles", the 12-minute opening track, is a perfect example of Anderson's ability to build tension and atmosphere with such simple melodies. His soft, Scottish accent cracking at the high notes is enough to induce goosebumps, but it's the unexpected drums that'll really get you."

== Track listing ==
1. "Ankle Shackles" - 11:41
2. "The Right Form" - 4:13
3. "What Exactly Have You Done?" - 4:56
