= Now (Nearly 36) =

Now (Nearly) 36

Studio album by King Creosote
- Released: 2003
- Genre: Folk
- Label: Fence Records

King Creosote chronology
Squeezebox Set (2002)	Now (Nearly) 36 (2003)	Psalm Clerk (2003)

Now (Nearly) 36 is the twenty-third studio album by King Creosote. It was released in 2003 on Fence Records.

== Track listing ==
1. The Donaldsons
2. Talking Again
3. Over The Top
4. Musakal Lives
5. Going Gone
6. Matty Groves
7. Steal Away
8. Monsigneur
