= Queen of Brush County =

Queen Of Brush County

Studio album by King Creosote
- Released: 1998
- Genre: Folk
- Label: Fence Collective

King Creosote chronology
Queen Of Brush County (1998)	Rain Weekend (1998)

Queen Of Brush County is the debut album by King Creosote, released in 1998.

== Track listing ==
1. Dr Alcohol
2. Homeboy
3. Philatelist
4. Mantra-Rap
5. Russian Sailor Shirts
6. Piano Crushing Back
7. Me In Here
8. Flounder
9. Your Guess Who's In At The Core?
10. Fell The Way Down, Leslie
11. Sparsety Sparse
12. So Forlorn
