= Seamus Fogarty =

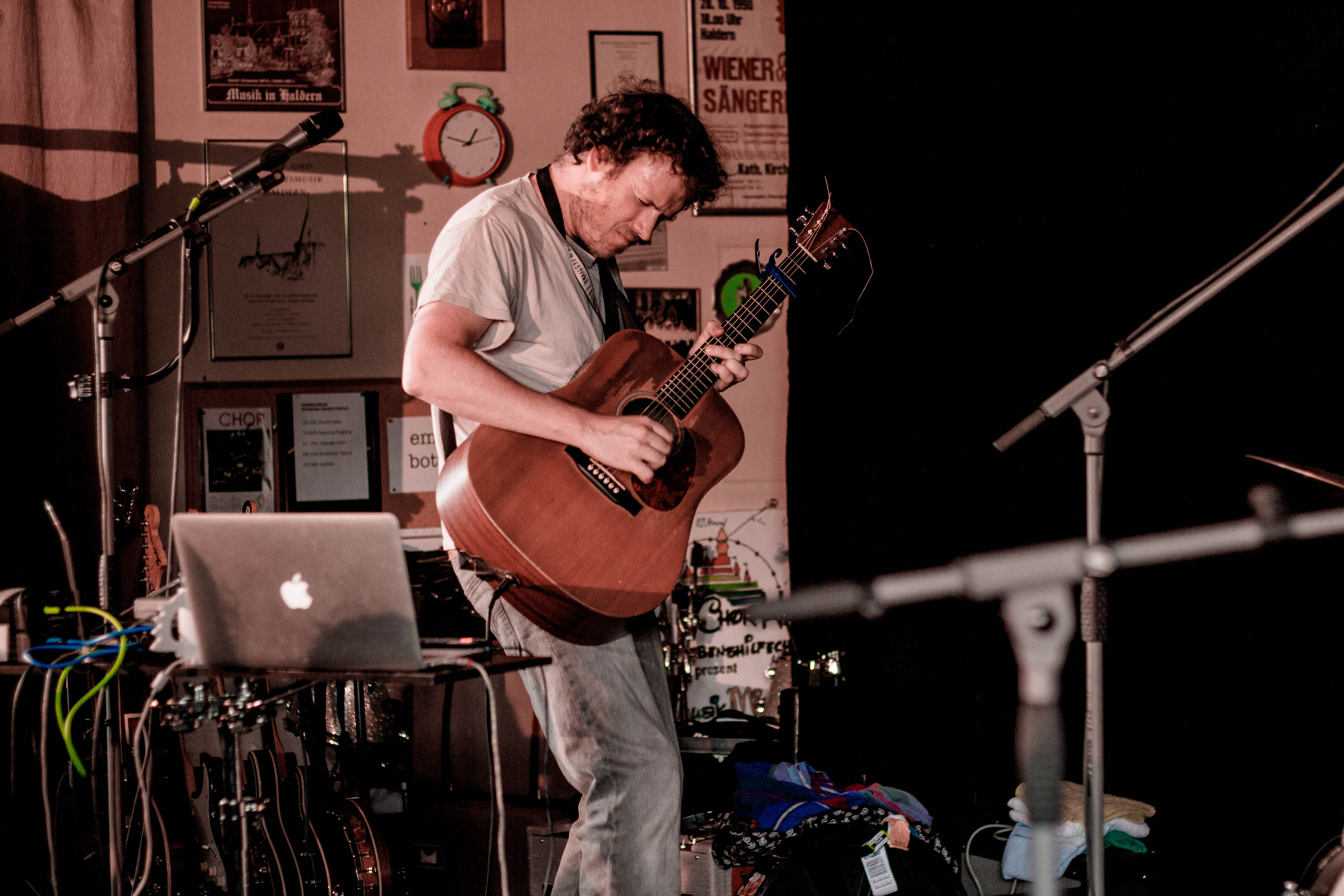
- Seamus Fogarty at Haldern Pop Festival 2018

Background information
- Origin: County Mayo, Ireland
- Genres: Folktronica
- Instruments: Vocals, banjo, fiddle, guitar
- Labels: Fence Records, Lost Map Records, Domino
- Website: http://seamusfogarty.com/

Seamus Fogarty is a London-based Irish singer-songwriter, originally from Swinford, County Mayo.

== Career ==
In 2012, Fogarty released his debut album, God Damn You Mountain, on the Scottish indie label Fence Records. Parts of the album were written and recorded in a cottage in South County Kerry. In an interview with The Quietus, Fogarty claimed the title of the album was inspired by the loss of his favorite t-shirt on the summit of a mountain in the Iveragh Peninsula.

In 2017, Fogarty released his second album, The Curious Hand, on Domino. Three years later, on 6 November 2020, his third studio album, A Bag Of Eyes, came out, recorded across London, Kent and East Sussex. The album features Fogarty’s partner Emma Smith, Meilyr Jones, long-time collaborators Leo Abrahams, Aram Zarikian and John Fogarty. The album was self-produced, and the sound has more electronica influences, synths, and drum machines. Fogarty said that he had been "experimenting with new ways of incorporating electronics into the songwriting process". In September, he released a single and video named “Johnny K”, which sets a spotlight to the uneasy state of an Irishman living in Brexit-London.

== Discography ==
=== Albums ===
- God Damn You Mountain (Fence Records, 2012)
- The Curious Hand (Domino, 2017)
- A Bag Of Eyes (Domino, 2020)
- Ships (Lost Map, 2026)

=== EPs ===
- Songs From A Cave EP (2009)
- Unfinished Lament EP (2009)
- Homegame EP (2009)
- Haarfest EP (2010)
- Paint The Road EP (2013)
- Ducks & Drakes (Lost Map Records, 2015)
- Hee Haw EP (Limited to 200 copies, Sold at Live Shows, 2023)
