= Stinks (album) =

Studio album by King Creosote
- Released: 2000
- Genre: Folk
- Label: Fence Collective

King Creosote chronology
12 O'Clock on the Dot (2000)	Stinks (2000)	G (2000)

Stinks is the thirteenth studio album by King Creosote, released in 2000.

== Track listing ==
1. Tongue In Groove
2. Little Grown Ups
3. Punchbag
4. Sulphur Breeze
5. X-reg Bartender
6. For Pity's Sake
7. Handful Of 78's
8. Hellen
9. Short & Sweet
10. Ten Posts, Nine Gaps
11. A Prairie Tale
12. Happily Never After
13. Small Child Bumps Her Head And Cries
14. La Dc Di Dah
15. Silence No More
16. All Over Caroline
17. Heaven Colour Dyes
18. Marie [sic] Celeste
19. Lost Again Billy
