= Virginia Heath =

Virginia K. Heath (born 1959) is a UK-based New Zealand film director and academic; she is a professor of film at Sheffield Hallam University. In 2002 she won the John O'Shea Film Award for the best New Zealand short film by a New Zealand director residing abroad.

== Biography ==
Heath was born in Havelock North, in the North Island of New Zealand. She studied film at Saint Martin's School of Art in London, England, in 1985 and 1986. She began her film career directing a series of international arts documentaries for the Channel 4 Television series ‘Rear Window’.

Heath was commissioned by the United Kingdom Human Trafficking Centre to create a film to highlight the issue of human trafficking. She carried out interviews with exploited girls and women, and frontline agency workers, and created the film My Dangerous Loverboy. A website and social media channels were later added to aid increased engagement with the film, and the overall project won a cross media award from the National Film Board of Canada and was nominated for a Royal Television Society Award. The film is extensively used in schools and youth centres, and with frontline agency workers across the United Kingdom.

Heath was also commissioned by Creative Scotland and the BBC to create a film for the Glasgow 2014 Commonwealth Games. The resulting film, From Scotland with Love, combined film with live music created by King Creosote and was nominated for a BAFTA Scotland award.

=== Filmography ===
| Year | Title | Role | Nominations and awards | Notes |
|---|---|---|---|---|
| 2019 | Three Chords and the Truth | Director | | |
| 2018 | Lift Share | Director | Winner, Best Sound Design, Underwire Film Festival, 2018 | |
| 2016 | We Are All Migrants | | | |
| 2014 | A Century in Film: from Scotland with Love | Director | Nominated for Best Feature Documentary, BAFTA Scotland, 2014 | |
| 2009 | My Dangerous Loverboy | Director Writer | Winner, National Film Board of Canada Cross Media Challenge Award, 2008 | |
| 2008 | Little Lost David: Devil Don't Mind | Director Writer | | |
| 2005 | Point Annihilation | Director Co-screenwriter | | |
| 2001 | Relativity | Director Screenplay | Winner, Best Short Film, Berlin International Film Festival, 2002 Winner, John O'Shea Film Award at New Zealand Drifting Clouds Film Festival, 2002 Nominated for European Film Academy Awards, 2002 | |
| 1998 | Deep Freeze | Director Screenplay | | |
| 1997 | Songs from the Golden City | Director | | |
| 1993 | Getting to the Point | Editor | | |
| 1992 | Carlo Levi Stopped Here | Director | | |
| | Looking Both Ways: Berlin-istanbul | | | |
| 1991 | The Crusade through Arab Eyes | Editor | | |
| 1989 | Diamonds in Brown Paper | Editor | | |
| 1988 | Perfect Image? | Editor | | |
| | Hell to Pay | | | |
| 1986 | The Passion of Remembrance | | | |
| 1985 | Pandora's Box | Director Screenplay Editor | | |
| 1984 | Deptford Wives | Director | | |
| | On the Top | Director | | |
| | Photographic Exhibits | Editor | | |
| | Council Matters | Editor | | |
| | Lives of Artists Not Wives of Artists: Women's Art Practice since 1970 | Editor | | |
| 1983 | Talking History | Editor | | |
| 1978 | Lorette | Editor Dubbing | | |
