= King Creosote Says "Buy The Bazouki Hair Oil" =

Studio album by King Creosote
- Released: 2001
- Genre: Folk
- Label: Fence Collective

King Creosote chronology
Radge Weekend Starts Here (2001)	King Creosote Says "Buy The Bazouki Hair Oil" (2001)	Disclaimer (2001)

King Creosote Says "Buy The Bazouki Hair Oil" is the sixteenth studio album by King Creosote, released in 2001.

== Track listing ==
1. Whine Glasses
2. Conscience
3. Sunny-Side Up
4. Moral Tenderhooks
5. Bubble
6. It's Boredom Alright
7. Fine
8. Sunshine
9. Crybaby
10. You Want to Walk
11. I'll Fly By the Seat of My Pants
12. It's All Very Well Lester Flatt
13. How Brave Am I?
