= Smash hit =

Smash hit or Smash hits may refer to:

- An overwhelming success, especially in the entertainment industry, such as an extraordinarily successful hit single (hit in the sense of "hitting the sales charts")
- Smash Hits, a defunct music magazine
  - Smash Hits (TV channel), a television channel spun off from the magazine
  - Smash Hits Radio, a UK-based digital radio station
- Smash Hits (The Jimi Hendrix Experience album), 1968
- Smash Hits (All Star United album), 2000
- Smash Hits, a 1968 album of covers by Tom Jones
- "Smash Hits" (song), a 2007 single by Kid Canaveral
- Smash Hit, a video game developed by Mediocre AB
- Hit o Nerae!, or Smash Hit! in English, anime series
- Guitar Hero Smash Hits, a 2009 video game
