= My Nth Bit of Strange in Umpteen Years =

Live album by King Creosote
- Released: October 2009 & March 2010
- Genre: Folk, alternative
- Language: English

King Creosote chronology
Flick the Vs (2009)	My Nth Bit of Strange in Umpteen Years (2009)	That Might Be It, Darling (2010)

My Nth Bit of Strange in Umpteen Years is a performance-only album by Scottish singer-songwriter King Creosote, debuted in October 2009, at Fence Records' Hallowe'en Homegame Festival. Described as a "celebration of community, intimacy, exclusivity, rarity and physical artefact," the album is not available in any physical form, and was performed seven times, throughout March 2010, on the condition that audience members record the album on whatever recording device they own. The List stated that, "King Creosote won’t release these songs commercially. Audience members, however, have his blessing to share their personal copies."

The album features "Bats in the Attic", which would subsequently appear on Creosote's Mercury Prize-nominated collaboration with Jon Hopkins, Diamond Mine.

== Background ==
Before its debut, Creosote stated, "Since 2005, I’ve watched my profile go up, my record sales go down, and my live audiences go down – despite there being more copies of my records on computers. I realised I had to make a stand, and I came up with an album that people won’t have to buy, but will have to hear live to fully appreciate. I’d love for the songs to become popular, and for me to take the show further afield, but because the album will change from one rendition to the next, I’m also hoping to attract the collectors. Plus it’ll test whether copying music for free really does make for larger audiences."

Creosote elaborated further, "Since the release of Flick the Vs in April, I’ve written ten new songs for an album that, for various reasons, I’d rather not record and release in the usual way. Instead I’ve come up with this idea of a live album. [...] Seven performances for forty people at a time over the course of three days."

== Writing and composition ==
Regarding the album's composition, and its unconventional mode of distribution, Creosote noted, "These new songs are more personal, and there’s lyrical freedom in knowing they’re not going to be pored over [as with a commercial release]. The unexpected thing when we first performed My Nth was the heightened concentration in the room. It was very powerful, a very charged atmosphere. No one talked or clapped. A few did cry. I nearly had a greet myself."

== Performance ==
Regarding its live nature, Creosote noted, "It's teasing people along to my live shows because if you miss one version of it, you have missed it entirely. I would like to think small labels can survive by being more creative. We have tried to do various stunts that build in value to our albums and gigs.”

== Track listing ==
1. "There's No Escape"
2. "Collector of Mundane"
3. "Trigger Happy, I Am"
4. "Bats in the Attic"
5. "Details"
6. "Swallow Dive"
7. "J"
8. "Tits Up"
9. "This Simple"
10. "The B All and End All of That"

== Personnel ==
- King Creosote - vocals, guitar
- Jon Hopkins - piano
- Captain Geeko - drums
