= Vintage Quays =

Studio album by King Creosote
- Released: 2005
- Genre: Folk
- Label: Fence

King Creosote chronology
| Rocket D.I.Y. (2005) | Vintage Quays (2005) | KC Rules OK (2005) |

Vintage Quays is the thirty-fourth studio album by King Creosote, released in 2005.

== Track listing ==
1. Tease
2. Insect Bites
3. CA M'ennerve
4. Queen Of Tarts
5. Dischord At Second Midnight
6. Harvest Time For It All
7. Voices
8. Carbon Dating Agent
9. Deranged, Derailed And Derided
10. Asylum Clothing
11. The Millstone
12. A Final Story
13. Toxins
