= They Flock Like Vulcans to See Old Jupiter Eyes on His Home Craters =

They Flock Like Vulcans To See Old Jupiter Eyes On His Home Craters

Studio album by King Creosote
- Released: 2008
- Genre: Folk
- Label: Fence

King Creosote chronology
Bombshell (2007)	They Flock Like Vulcans To See Old Jupiter Eyes On His Home Craters (2008)	Flick the Vs (2009)

They Flock Like Vulcans To See Old Jupiter Eyes On His Home Craters is the 37th studio album by King Creosote, released in 2008.

== Track listing ==
1. On Esther's Planet
2. No One Had It Better
3. Ear Against The Wireless
4. Houston Tharoule
5. A Mighty Din Of 'What If?'s
6. Think Elephant
7. Dead Mouse Diary
8. 44BC
9. Home Creatures
10. The Minter Scale
11. It's Going To End In Tears
12. All Mine
