= Kid Canaveral =

Scottish alternative pop band

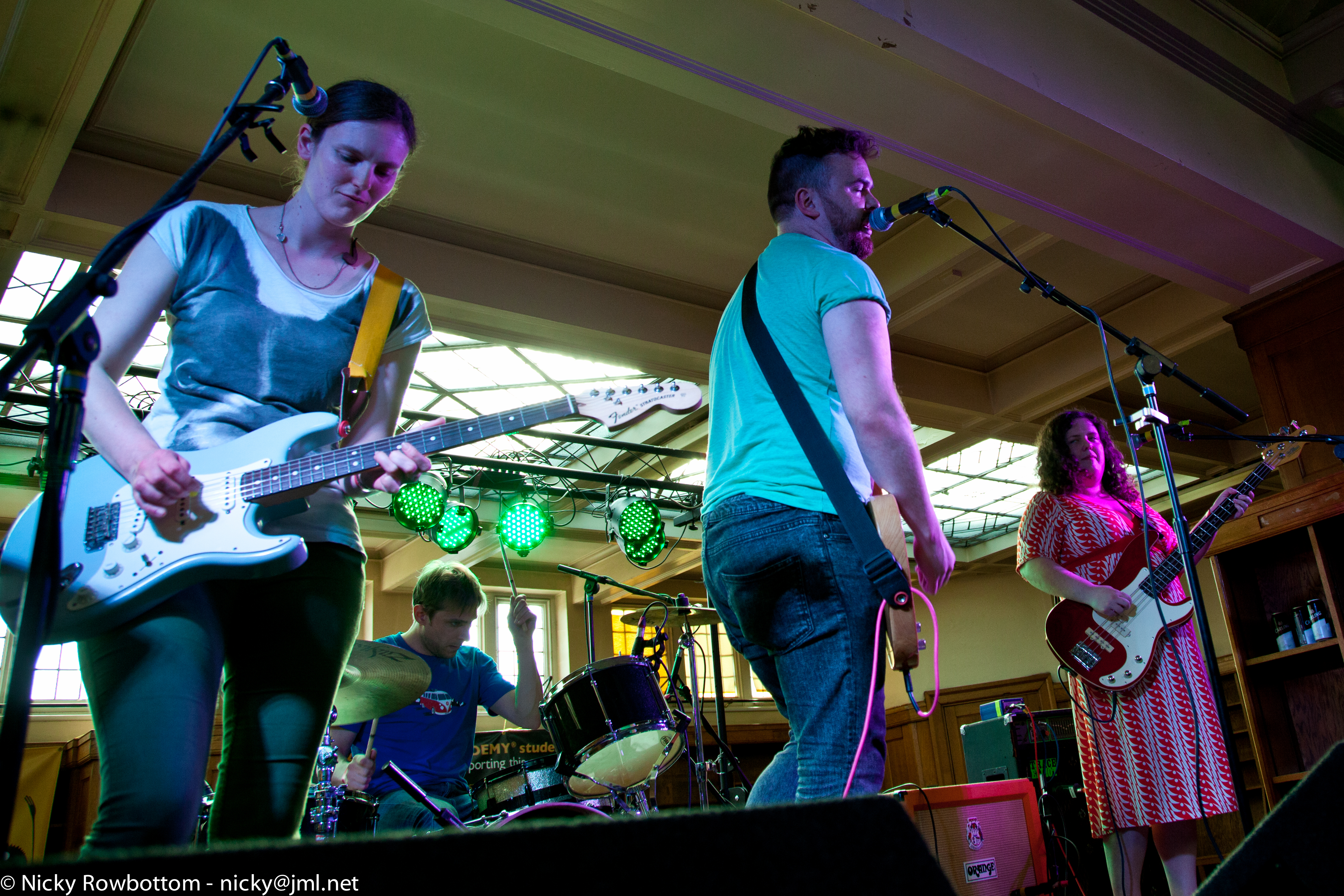
- Kid Canaveral in 2013

Background information
- Origin: St Andrews, Scotland
- Genres: Alternative, indie rock, indie pop, power pop, Post-pop
- Years active: 2005–2019
- Labels: Straight to Video Records (2007–10); Fence Records (2010–13); Lost Map Records (2013–2019)
- Members: David MacGregor; Kate Lazda; Rose McConnachie; Scott McMaster(2009–2019); Michael Craig (2015–2017)
- Past members: Dan Sheehy (2005–2008); Clarke Geddes (2008–2009)
- Website: http://www.kidcanaveral.co.uk

Kid Canaveral was a Scottish alternative pop band that formed in St Andrews in Fife, Scotland, but are now based in Edinburgh, Scotland. Since 2007 the band have released a number of well received singles, an E.P. and an album on their own label, Straight to Video Records, and in 2011 they signed with Scottish independent label Fence Records. The band left Fence Records to join Johnny Lynch on his new label Lost Map Records in August 2013. The band have received praise for their pop hooks and melodies, and their energetic and engaging live performances. Their second record Now That You Are a Dancer was nominated for the 2014 Scottish Album of the Year Award. The group released their third record Faulty Inner Dialogue, via Lost Map Records, on 29 July 2016.

== History ==
=== Early years ===
Kid Canaveral formed in St Andrews, Scotland, in 2004. The original line-up consisted of: David MacGregor (originally from Glasgow, Scotland) on guitar and vocals; Kate Lazda (from Wokingham, England) on guitar and vocals; Rose McConnachie (also from Glasgow, Scotland) on vocals and bass guitar; and Dan Sheehy (from Dublin, Republic of Ireland) on drums. The band played their first gig supporting King Creosote and The Pictish Trail in St Andrews. The band relocated to Edinburgh in 2006 in order to be able to play a greater number of gigs, and for the opportunity to play to a wider audience. In order to release their own records David and Kate set up Straight to Video Records and between 2007 and 2010 the band put out four 7" singles (Smash Hits, Couldn't Dance, Second Time Around and I don't have the heart for this), two cassette singles (Left and Right E.P. and You Only Went Out to Get Drunk Last Night) and their debut album.

Original drummer Dan Sheehy left the band after the release of their fourth single in December 2008, to be replaced by Clarke Geddes (from Cupar, Scotland). Clarke parted company with the band to move to Switzerland in June 2009 after the initial sessions for the band's first album. Scott McMaster (from Girvan, Scotland) was announced as his replacement shortly afterwards.

=== Shouting at Wildlife 2010–2011 ===
Shouting at Wildlife Main Article

Their debut album Shouting at Wildlife was released on Monday 5 July 2010 on Straight to Video Records. The band toured the UK extensively and played a number of festivals in support of the album and recorded a live session for BBC Radio Scotland, playing tracks from the album and a cover of the King Creosote song 'Missionary' from Kenny and Beth's Musakal Boat Rides.

It was announced on 23 February 2011 that the band had been signed to Fence Records, and that the label would be re-releasing Shouting at Wildlife on Vinyl in July 2011. Kid Canaveral completed a short tour of the United States in March including a number of shows at the 2011 SxSW festival in Austin, Texas. As well as their own performances, the band acted as King Creosote's backing band for two gigs, one at the Domino Records Showcase at Emo's and one at the British Music Embassy in Latitude 30. Kid Canaveral were filmed before and during SxSW as part of a BBC Artworks documentary about the festival. The band made a number of festival appearances in 2011 in the UK, most notably at T in the Park (on the BBC Introducing stage), The Edge Festival and the Belladrum Festival.

=== Now That You Are a Dancer 2012–2015 ===
Now That You Are a Dancer Main Article
Kid Canaveral recorded their second album during a number of sessions in between January and September 2012 at Fourth Street Studios in Glasgow, Scotland. Prior to the album's release the band undertook a tour of the US and Canada to test out the new material. They released second album Now That You Are a Dancer on Monday 4 March 2013 on Fence Records.

=== Faulty Inner Dialogue 2016– ===
Faulty Inner Dialogue Main Article

=== Band Hiatus ===
After the tour for Faulty Inner Dialogue, Kate Lazda said that she wanted to go on a break from the band. In 2019 David MacGregor announced his new project Broken Chanter.

== Critical response ==
The Glasgow Herald magazine praised the band's style, hailing them as their "new favourite Scottish Band" drawing similarities with the powerpop of XTC and The Undertones. The band have received mainly positive coverage from the press, with further praise coming from The Daily Record describing the band as "the best thing to come out of St Andrews since KT Tunstall". The List described the group as having a "charming playfulness" and "unpretentious style". After seeing the band perform at Fête de la Musique as part of Glasgow's West End Festival, Paul Whitelaw described the band in his review of the event in The Scotsman as "Juicy, chewy pop-kids to savour, proving that life still twitches in this indie guitar-pop business". The Fly deem the band to "showcase a sound too big to be Scotland's secret for much longer" and have carried a number of positive live reviews.

The band's debut album received universally positive reviews, with The Skinny describing Shouting at Wildlife as "a thrilling, uplifting and generally all-round spiffing combination of indie-pop skills, lyrical wit, and choruses sung through smiles" and The List praised the record for being "packed with singalong melodies, frisky jangles and a real sense of purpose. A jubilant and skilful racket." The album was BBC Radio 1 Session in Scotland's Album of the Month for July 2010 and the album featured at, or near, the top of a number of end of year lists and polls.

Upon the re-release of Shouting at Wildlife by Fence Records the Glasgow Herald described the album as "a Scottish pop classic [that] should be mandatory in every record collection in the country" and Vic Galloway and Tom Morton featured it as their 'Album of the Week' on their respective BBC Radio Scotland shows, in its week of release.

== Christmas Baubles ==
The band host an annual Christmas Party in Edinburgh that goes by the name "Kid Canaveral's Christmas Baubles". The inaugural event was held at The Lot in December 2010, and featured performances from King Creosote, ballboy, Come On Gang!, Cancel the Astronauts, The Last Battle and Gummi Bako as well as Kid Canaveral. The sell out success of the first year encouraged the band to host for a second year, in the larger Summerhall venue, with Slow Club, Josie Long, eagleowl, Standard Fare, Martin John Henry, The Pictish Trail, Aidan John Moffat, Kid Canaveral and Sweet Baboo all performing. The second baubles event sold out weeks in advance of the show. Kid Canaveral hosted Christmas Baubles III in The Caves in Edinburgh on Saturday 22 December 2012 and featured performances from Malcolm Middleton, FOUND, Josie Long, Eleanor Morton, RM Hubbert, Meursault, Randolph's Leap, Elaine Malcolmson, OnTheFly and Kid Canaveral. Like the two Baubles before it, the event sold out weeks in advance. Christmas Baubles IV was held at Portobello Town Hall and featured performances from Edwyn Collins, Pictish Trail, Rozi Plain, Siobhan Wilson, De Rosa and Tuff Love. 2014 saw Ibibio Sound Machine, Paws, Randolph's Leap, Sweet Baboo and the Pictish Trail, and Hector Bizerk appear at Christmas Baubles V at Portobello Town Hall. Baubles moved to Pilrig Hall in Leith for its sixth outing in 2015. Bossy Love, Kathryn Joseph, De Rosa, Ultras and Prehistoric Friends all took to the stage. Following selling out for the seventh year in a row, this time in a record 13 hours, Pilrig Hall was the venue again for Christmas Baubles VII, with live sets from Firestations, James Yorkston, Withered Hand, Pictish Trail, Martha Ffion, Breakfast Muff, digitalanalogue, and Randolph's Leap.

== Discography ==
- Shouting at Wildlife (2010)
- Now That You Are a Dancer (2013)
- Faulty Inner Dialogue (2016)

== Awards and nominations ==
| Year | Organisation | Award | Album | Result |
|---|---|---|---|---|
| 2014 | Scottish Album of the Year Award | Scottish Album of the Year | Now That You are a Dancer | Nominated – Longlist of 20 |
