= Planet Eggz =

Studio album by King Creosote
- Released: 1999
- Genre: Folk
- Label: Fence

King Creosote chronology
I Am 9 (1999)	Planet Eggz (1999)	Or Was It? (2000)

Planet Eggz is the tenth studio album by King Creosote, released in 1999.

== Track listing ==
All tracks are written by King Creosote, except where noted.

No.	Title	Writer(s)	Length
1.	"Dutch"
2.	"Worldly Wiser"
3.	"Was I Ever?"
4.	"Fall in Thee"	Gordon Anderson
5.	"I'm so Careful"
6.	"Single Swan"
7.	"Mantra Rap"
8.	"Lonely Vagabond"	Anderson
9.	"Writer's Block"
10.	"Advice"
11.	"Touched by Tomoko"	Anderson
12.	"Case of the Missing Closet (Corset Case)"
13.	"Ache"
14.	"And so for Lorna"
