= 1999: An Endless Round of Balls (Parties and Social Events) =

1999: An Endless Round Of Balls (Parties And Social Events)

Studio album by King Creosote
- Released: 1999
- Genre: Folk
- Label: Fence Collective

King Creosote chronology
| Gink Scootere (1998) | 1999: An Endless Round Of Balls (Parties And Social Events) (1999) | Wednesday (1999) |

1999: An Endless Round Of Balls (Parties And Social Events) is the sixth studio album by King Creosote, released in 1999. Speaking of the album Anderson said "It is the correct balance of weird and epic I think. I recorded some of it when I was in a very happy/sad place. It's ace."

== Track listing ==
1. An Understanding Man
2. The Line
3. Casino Clubbing
4. All Fours
5. Reds
6. The Blues
7. Green Times
8. Climbing Trees
9. Officer Dribble
10. Our Old Times
11. Size Matters
12. The Last James (Plus Bong's Greatest Hits / ...It's Sad, Here I Am...)
