= Gink Scootere =

Gink Scotere

Studio album by King Creosote
- Released: 1998
- Genre: Folk
- Label: Fence Records

King Creosote chronology
Or Is It? (1998)	Gink Scotere (1998)	1999: An Endless Round of Balls (Parties and Social Events) (1999)

Gink Scootere is the fifth studio album by King Creosote. It was released in 1998 on Fence Records.

== Track listing ==
1. Dr. Alcopop
2. Huckleberry Homeboy
3. Thinners
4. Crushing Bach Piano
5. Marsha
6. Lone Pigeon
7. Your Crappy day
8. One and the same
9. Breeze once more on me
10. Leslie
11. Outer Crail to Inner Space
12. Whatsover
13. Dankety Dank
14. Hello for the last time
15. Sighs Mattress
