= G (King Creosote album) =

Studio album by King Creosote
- Released: 2001
- Genre: Folk
- Label: Fence Records

King Creosote chronology
Stinks (2000)	G (2001)	Radge Weekend Starts Here (2001)

G is the fourteenth studio album by King Creosote. It was released in 2001.

== Track listing ==
1. Your Face
2. Two of a Kind
3. Missionary
4. Russian Sailor Shirts
5. S.E.P.
6. Once Was Lost
7. Now Who'd Believe It?
8. A Prairie Tale
9. Walk Tall
10. All I Ask
11. Once was Broken
12. Breaking Up...
