= Or Is It? =

Studio album by King Creosote
- Released: 1998
- Genre: Folk
- Label: Fence Collective

King Creosote chronology
| Inner Crail To Outer Space (1998) | Or Is It? (1998) | Gink Scootere (1998) |

Or Is It? is the fourth studio album by King Creosote, released in 1998.

== Track listing ==
1. Powerful Stuff
2. Rain Weekend
3. Empty Town
4. Jump at the Cats
5. Folk Section #1
6. Sans Restraint
7. Head
8. So Forlorn
9. Find Me Town Empty
10. Leslie
11. Mail Train
12. Folk Section #2
13. Lighthouse
14. The Bear
15. Old John (Plus Simple Simon and the Missing Pieman "Gink Scootere")
