= Squeezebox Set =

Compilation album by King Creosote
- Released: 2002
- Genre: Folk
- Label: Fence Collective

King Creosote chronology
Disclaimer (2001)	Squeezebox Set (2002)	Now (Nearly 36) (2003)

Squeezebox Set is a five album box set containing studio albums eighteen to twenty-two by King Creosote, released in 2002. The wooden box is handmade and includes "Losing it on the gyles", "More Afraid of Plastic", "Whelk of Arse", "Favourite Girl" and "Fair Dubhs". The albums included are not available individually. The box set has been sold for upwards of £200."

== Track listing ==
=== King Creosote's Losing It On The Gyles ===
1. The Sea Gyles
2. Cowboys And Canyons
3. Coyote Pups
4. Sun-Soured Milk
5. Home Again...
6. ...Safe?
7. It's Not The Drink That I Love More
8. Beguiles
9. Your Young Voice
10. Crailscapes
11. The Gyles
12. Julian's Unwitting Blues

=== More Afraid Of Plastic ===
1. Waashoot
2. Please...Give...Me...Peace...
3. Mooning
4. Choke Madelaine
5. Bad Harvest
6. Soul Disintegration
7. Voyeur
8. Citrus Budgies
9. Waving Your Right Arm
10. Bad Bad Harvest
11. Sea Rain
12. Sleepy Quay
13. Grabbing A Swan's Leg
14. Untitled

=== Whelk Of Arse ===
1. Work Of Art
2. Travis May Sue Your Ass
3. My Favourite Girl In All The World
4. Bootprints
5. 35cl
6. Pinning The Tail On The Donkey
7. Ding Dinio
8. All At Sea
9. Klutz
10. Cohones
11. Spokes
12. Go Rimbaud Go
13. The Importance Of Looking Right
14. Scales Of The World
15. The Coo's Tail
16. Captain Geeko The Dead Aviator

=== King Creosote's Favourite Girl ===
1. Mon Dieux
2. Little Heart, Littler Banjo
3. Chest Of Drawers
4. Please ... Give ... Me ... Pieces
5. Karlsruhe
6. Favourite Girl
7. Toast Time
8. Marguerita Bled Me Dry
9. Travis May Sue Your Dirty Ass
10. At The W.A.L.
11. Crailway Station
12. Little Death
13. How Brave Was I?
14. Kenny And Beth's Musacal Boat Rides

=== Fair Dubhs ===
1. Welcome
2. Eggshell Miles
3. Bathtime Maybe
4. Skinny Dipping
5. Clown
6. Moon Barking
7. Precious Daze
8. Shame On Sherlock
9. Insomniac
10. Let La Guerre Begin Again
11. Armistice
12. Untitled
