= That Might Well Be It, Darling =

Studio album by King Creosote
- Released: 21 April 2013
- Recorded: Chem 19, December 2010 - June 2011
- Genre: Indie folk
- Label: Domino
- Producer: Paul Savage

King Creosote chronology
| Honest Words (2011) | That Might Well Be It, Darling (2013) | Sure & Steadfast (2013) |

That Might Well Be It, Darling is a studio album by Scottish indie folk musician King Creosote, released on 21 April 2013 on Domino Records. Produced by Paul Savage, and released in conjunction with Record Store Day 2013, the album is a full-band re-recording of Creosote's limited edition vinyl release, That Might Be It, Darling (2010), and was initially released as three EPs: I Learned from the Gaels (2012), To Deal With Things (2012) and It Turned Out for the Best (2012).

Frequent collaborator Alan "Gummi Bako" Stewart sings lead vocals on the album's opening and closing tracks.

== Background and recording ==
In 2010, King Creosote released a vinyl-only studio album, That Might Be It, Darling, which was only available to purchase at live performances. The album was predominantly an acoustic release, with appearances from frequent collaborator Alan "Gummi Bako" Stewart and Rich Young. In December 2010, Creosote and his band entered Chem 19 studios with producer Paul Savage to record a full-band version of the album. Regarding the recording process, Creosote noted, "I wanted Darling to sound like we'd just barged in to the studio and faffed our way through it, which we kind of did, and nothing ended up the way we thought it would."

== Reception ==
Professional ratings
Review scores
| Source | Rating |
|---|---|
| The Independent | 4/5 stars |

The Independent's Andy Gill gave the album a very positive review, writing: "[That Might Well Be It, Darling] may well be Kenny Anderson's best album."

== Track listing ==
All tracks written by Kenny Anderson, except where noted.

1. "Little Man" (Alan Stewart)
2. "Single Cheap"
3. "Doubles Underneath"
4. "Near Star, Pole Star" (Anderson/Jennifer Gordon)
5. "Ankle Shackles"
6. "The Right Form"
7. "What Exactly Have You Done?"
8. "On the Night of the Bonfire"
9. "I Am Cellist"
10. "February 29th"
11. "Going Gone" (Alan Stewart/Anderson)

== Recording personnel ==
=== King Creosote Band ===
- Kenny Anderson – lead vocals, acoustic guitar, electric guitar, Schechter guitar, accordion, piano, samples, vibraphone, washboard, wine glasses
- Gavin Brown – drums, keyboards, samples, synths
- Peter Macleod – electric bass, electric guitar
- Derek O'Neill – keyboards, organ, piano, Wurlitzer, string arrangements
- Richard Parkinson – acoustic guitar, electric guitar
- Andrew Robinson – drums, djembe
- Alan Stewart – lead vocals (1 and 11), acoustic guitar

=== Additional musicians ===
- Kate Duffy – violin
- Vic Galloway – backing vocals
- Jennifer Gordon – acoustic guitar, vocals (4)
- Peter Harvey – cello, string arrangements
- Kate Lazda – backing vocals
- Kate Miguda – violin
- Richard Young – piano

=== Recording personnel ===
- Paul Savage – producer, recording
- Derek O'Neill – recording assistant
- Guy Davie – mastering

=== Artwork ===
- Kenny Anderson – artwork
- Midget Squid – digital design
- Matt Cooper – digital design
- Nicola Meighan – liner notes
