= Rocket D.I.Y. =

Studio album by King Creosote
- Released: 4 April 2005
- Recorded: August to October 2006
- Genre: Folk
- Length: 37:46
- Label: Fence; Domino
- Producer: Lingus Gordon

King Creosote chronology
Sea Glass (2003)	Rocket D.I.Y. (2005)	Vintage Quays (2005)

Rocket D.I.Y. is a studio album by Scottish singer-songwriter King Creosote, released on 4 April 2005 on Fence Records and Domino.

In 2009, the album was ranked #17 in The Skinny's "Scottish Albums of the Decade" list, with frequent collaborator The Pictish Trail stating, "Now, yes, I know this was a Fence Records release, and yes, I'm fully aware that I am a member of King Creosote's band. But I genuinely think from start to finish, that this is the best album Scotland has produced since 01/01/00."

== Track listing ==
1. "Twin Tub Twin" – 3:13
2. "Saffy Nool" – 4:37
3. "Klutz" – 2:11
4. "Crow's Feet" – 3:08
5. "Spooned Out On Tick" – 3:36
6. "pH 6.4" – 2:27
7. "Circle My Demise" – 3:19
8. "King Bubbles In Sand" – 1:49
9. "The Things, Things, Things" – 3:33
10. "A Month Of Firsts" – 4:10
11. "Thrills & Spills" – 3:01
12. "The Someone Else" – 2:42
