= Disclaimer (disambiguation) =

A disclaimer is generally any statement intended to specify or delimit the scope of rights and obligations that may be exercised and enforced by parties in a legally recognized relationship.

Disclaimer may also refer to:

- Disclaimer (patent), in patent law, words identifying, in a claim, subject-matter that is not claimed
- Disclaimer of interest, an attempt by a person to renounce their legal right to benefit from an inheritance

== Arts, entertainment, and media ==
=== Music ===
- Disclaimer (King Creosote album), 2001
- Disclaimer (Seether album), 2002
  - Disclaimer II, an album by Seether

=== Television ===
- Disclaimer (miniseries), seven-part psychological thriller television miniseries on Apple TV+
