= Wednesday (album) =

Studio album by King Creosote
- Released: 1999
- Genre: Folk
- Label: Fence Records

King Creosote chronology
1999: An Endless Round Of Balls (Parties And Social Events) (1999)	Wednesday (1999)	Jacques De Fence (1999)

Wednesday is the seventh studio album by King Creosote. It was released in 1999 on Fence Records.

== Track listing ==
1. Little paint
2. T-reg kiosk
3. All my legs
4. Madam
5. Today begins without me
6. 911
7. A paux fas bullshite
8. Turtles beentween me an rger dog
