= Astronaut Meets Appleman =

Studio album by King Creosote
- Released: 2 September 2016
- Length: 53:27
- Label: Domino
- Producer: Kenny Anderson; Paul Savage

King Creosote chronology
From Scotland with Love (2014)	Astronaut Meets Appleman (2016)	I Des (2023)

Astronaut Meets Appleman is a studio album by Scottish indie folk musician King Creosote, released on 2 September 2016 through Domino Recording Company. It received acclaim from critics and reached number 25 on the UK Albums Chart.

== Background ==
The album title was inspired by Anderson gifting his daughter a toy man made from an apple, which she was more interested in than a spaceman toy she had also been given.

== Critical reception ==
Professional ratings
Aggregate scores
Source	Rating
Metacritic	79/100
Review scores
Source	Rating
AllMusic	3.5/5 stars
Mojo	4/5 stars
MusicOMH	4/5 stars
Uncut	8/10
Drowned in Sound	8/10

Astronaut Meets Appleman received a score of 79 out of 100 on review aggregator Metacritic based on 14 critics' reviews, indicating "generally favorable" reception. AllMusic's Timothy Monger found it to be "a looser set" than From Scotland with Love (2014) "whose earthy ramblings seem grounded more firmly in the present" and although "not one of Anderson's most immediately engaging albums", he found it to have "a meandering charm that works its magic over time". John Murphy of MusicOMH described it as "an album where everything but the kitchen sink (strings, beats, even bagpipes) seems to have been thrown in, and yet it maintains a fierce focus".

Mojo stated that it "could be King Creosote's finest hour yet", while Uncut felt that "his wrinkled brogue—warm, pithy, occasionally fluttering to a falsetto—is a thing of understated beauty in itself, framed in folk-shanty arrangements that make telling use of strings and bagpipe".

== Track listing ==
Astronaut Meets Appleman track listing
No.	Title	Length
1.	"You Just Want"	7:25
2.	"Melin Wynt"	5:16
3.	"Wake Up to This"	3:33
4.	"Faux Call"	5:06
5.	"Betelgeuse"	4:27
6.	"Love Life"	4:15
7.	"Peter Rabbit Tea"	2:48
8.	"Surface"	6:18
9.	"Rules of Engagement"	4:31
10.	"The Long Fade" (bonus track)	9:48
Total length:		53:27

== Charts ==
Chart performance for Astronaut Meets Appleman
Chart (2016)	Peak position
Scottish Albums (OCC)	2
UK Albums (OCC)	25
UK Independent Albums (OCC)	8
