= Sure & Steadfast =

Studio album by King Creosote
- Released: 2013
- Genre: Folk
- Label: Boer Records

King Creosote chronology
That Might Well Be It, Darling (2013)	Sure & Steadfast (2013)	From Scotland with Love (2014)

Sure & Steadfast is a studio album by King Creosote, released in 2013. The album was recorded and released to raise money for the Scottish Fisheries Museum, based in Anstruther.

== Track listing ==
1. Cicero Had An Anchor Tattoo
2. Bodes Unwell
3. Third Party
4. An Ode To Falling Overboard
5. Salt Eyed At The Bathing Pool
6. Ounces
7. The Grime Reaper
8. Easojuly
9. Proverbial Pine
10. Carry On Dancing
11. Precious Lord; We Have An Anchor
