= DJ Dan (Propaganda) =

DJ Dan is the creator of Propaganda (indie club night), at the age of 20 while still studying at Bristol University. Originating in a small 200 capacity club in Bristol, it has since become the UK's biggest indie night with over 20,000 people attending it every week in cities including London, Sydney, Dublin and Bristol and Manchester.

In 2005, DJ Dan DJed for Oasis at the Milton Keynes Bowl, which resulted in him being their official aftershow DJ. Including their last UK stadium tour in 2009 where he DJed at venues including Wembley Stadium and the Cardiff Millennium Stadium.

In 2007, DJ Dan played at Oasis’ personal Brit Awards Party, which saw him DJ to artists including Amy Winehouse, Red Hot Chili Peppers, Lily Allen, Courtney Love, Muse, The Killers, Arctic Monkeys, Aerosmith, Kasabian and The Stereophonics.

DJ Dan’s festival appearances include, Reading Festival, V Festival, Oxegen, Bestival, Snowbombing and The Big Chill.

In 2010, DJ Dan presented ‘Radio Propaganda’ on NME Radio along with Alex Zane.
