= Simon M. Kirby =

British cognitive scientist

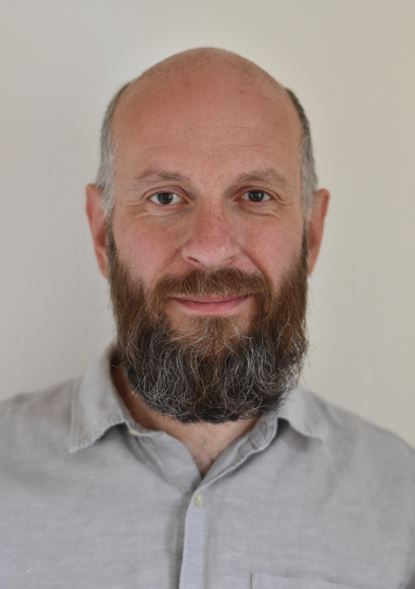
Simon M. Kirby, British cognitive scientist and professor of language evolution.

Simon M. Kirby is a British cognitive scientist, currently holding the Chair of Language Evolution at the University of Edinburgh, where he is Director of the Graduate School, and Programme Director for the MSc in the Evolution of Language and Cognition. He specializes in evolutionary computational models of human language and its development.

He is a creator, together with members of the experimental pop band FOUND, of Cybraphon, an "autonomous emotional robot band" in a wardrobe, which won a BAFTA in 2009.

== Publications ==
Kirby has published over 52 articles, chapters, and other publications, including the books:

- Christiansen, M. and Kirby, S. (2003). Language Evolution. Oxford University Press.
- Kirby, S. (1999). Function, Selection and Innateness: the Emergence of Language Universals. Oxford University Press.

and the peer-reviewed journal articles:

- Kirby, S., Dowman, M. and Griffiths, T. (2007) Innateness and culture in the evolution of language. Proceedings of the National Academy of Sciences, 104(12):5241-5245.
- Brighton, H. and Kirby, S. (2006). Understanding linguistic evolution by visualizing the emergence of topographic mappings. Artificial Life, 12(2):229-242.
- Brighton, H., Smith, K., and Kirby, S. (2005). Language as evolutionary system. Physics of Life Reviews, 2:177-226.
- Kirby, S. (2004). Bias, innateness and domain specificity. Journal of Child Language, 31:927-930.
- Kirby, S., Smith, K., and Brighton, H. (2004). From UG to universals: linguistic adaptation through iterated learning. Studies in Language, 28(3):587-607.
- Christiansen, M. H. and Kirby, S. (2003). Language evolution: Consensus and controversies. Trends in Cognitive Sciences, 7(7):300-307.
- Miranda, E. R., Kirby, S., and Todd, P. M. (2003). On computational models of the evolution of music: From the origins of musical taste to the emergence of grammars. Contemporary Music Review, 22(3):91-111.
- Smith, K., Brighton, H., and Kirby, S. (2003). Complex systems in language evolution: the cultural emergence of compositional structure. Advances in Complex Systems, 6(4):537-558.
- Smith, K., Kirby, S., and Brighton, H. (2003). Iterated learning: a framework for the emergence of language. Artificial Life, 9(4):371-386.
- Kirby, S. (2002). Natural language from artificial life. Artificial Life, 8(2):185-215.
- Wheeler, M., Bullock, S., Paolo, E. A. D., Noble, J., Bedau, M., Husbands, P., Kirby, S., and Seth, A. (2002). The view from elsewhere: Perspectives on Alife modeling. Artificial Life, 8(1):97-100.
- Kirby, S. (2001). Spontaneous evolution of linguistic structure: an iterated learning model of the emergence of regularity and irregularity. IEEE Transactions on Evolutionary Computation, 5(2):102-110.
- Todd, P. and Kirby, S. (2001). I like what I know: How recognition-based decisions can structure the environment. In Kelemen, J. and Sosik, P., editors, Advances in Artificial Life. Springer.
- Kirby, S. (2000). The role of I-language in diachronic adaptation. Zeitschrift für Sprachwissenschaft, 18(2).
- Kirby, S. (1998). Motivations concurrentes et emergence comme explications des hierarchies implicationnelles. Verbum, XX(3):309-336.
- Hurford, J., Joseph, S., Kirby, S., and Reid, A. (1997). Evolution might select constructivism. Behavioral and Brain Sciences, 20:567-568.
- Kirby, S. (1997). Competing motivations and emergence: explaining implicational hierarchies. Language Typology, 1(1):5-32.
- Kirby, S. and Hurford, J. (1995). Neural preconditions for proto-language. Behavioral and Brain Sciences, 18(1):193-194.
- Kirby, S. (1994). Adaptive explanations for language universals: a model of Hawkins' performance theory. Sprachtypologie und Universalienforschung, 47:186-210.

== See also ==
- Artificial life
