= Alexia Avina =

American singer-songwriter

Alexia Grace Avina is an American folk musician, singer-songwriter, and guitarist from Montreal, Quebec, now based in Massachusetts. Avina's signature sound is a soft blend of ambient dream pop and electronica.

== History ==
Avina released her first set of music in 2014, an EP titled Kind Forest. Avina released her second EP in 2017 titled Surrender. Avina released her first album in 2018 titled Betting on an Island. In 2019, Avina released her second album titled All That I Can't See. Avina announced her third album on July 29, 2020, and it was released on October 9, 2020. Avina released her fourth album on April 29, 2022, titled A Little Older, released by Lost Map Records.

== Discography ==
=== Studio albums ===
- Betting on an Island (2018)
- All That I Can't See (2019)
- Unearth (2020)
- A Little Older (2022)
- In The Pantheon of Decay (2023)

=== Singles and EPs ===
- "Kind Forest" (2014)
- Surrender (2017)
- Attitude (2019)
- Fit Into (2020)
- Cups (2020)
- Horse's Mane (2020)
- Teenage Dirtbag (2021)
- How Can I Learn (2021)
- Human (2022)
- I Am Opening (2022)
- Poison (2022)
