= KC Rules OK =

Studio album by King Creosote
- Released: 19 September 2005; 12 June 2006 (special edition); 19 September 2025 (20th anniversary extended edition)
- Recorded: Airtight, April 2005
- Genre: Folk
- Length: 43:52
- Label: Names
- Producer: Giles Hatton, Tom Knott, Christian Madden

King Creosote chronology
Vintage Quays (2005)	KC Rules OK (2005)	Bombshell (2007)

Professional ratings
Review scores
Source	Rating
Twisted Ear	4.5/5 stars

KC Rules OK is a studio album by Scottish singer-songwriter King Creosote, released on 19 September 2005 on Names. A subsequent remastered special edition version of the album was released in 2006 with a new track, "So Forlorn", re-recordings of "678" and "Marguerita Red" and liner notes by author Ian Rankin. A further extended and remastered version of the album, also featuring demos and remixes, was released on its 20th anniversary, 19 September 2025, on vinyl and CD.

The album's liner notes state that the songs featured on it were written between 1988 and 2003. The Earlies performed as Creosote's backing band on the album.

== Accolades ==
In December 2009, KC Rules OK ranked #6 in The Skinny's "Scottish Albums of the Decade" poll. Upon receiving the accolade, Anderson stated, "For me KC Rules OK was basically the first chance I got to do a proper album as King Creosote. I'm very proud of the titles I've put out through Fence but anyone can put their own music out on their own label. Yes, there are a few things you need to do to get there, but you are your own yardstick for quality. [...] At the time it felt like a bit of daunting step. It was basically me going into a studio with my chords and my words and saying to somebody else: "What would you do with that?" But The Earlies were great. They weren't precious and didn't tiptoe around me."

The album was recommended in the October 2007 issue of Q as recommended further listening for KT Tunstall's Drastic Fantastic.

== Track listing ==
1. "Not One Bit Ashamed" – 5:01
2. "You Are, Could I?" – 3:53
3. "The Vice-Like Gist of It" – 2:58
4. "Bootprints" – 3:49
5. "Locked Together" – 4:45
6. "Jump at the Cats" – 2:33
7. "Guess the Time" – 1:06
8. "Favourite Girl" – 5:35
9. "I'll Fly by the Seat of My Pants" – 4:06
10. "678" – 6:16
11. "Marguerita Red" – 3:50

== Personnel ==
The following people contributed to KC Rules OK:

=== Musicians ===
- King Creosote - vocals, guitar, arrangements
- The Earlies - various instruments
- Christian Madden - arrangements

=== Recording personnel ===
- Giles Hatton - producer
- Tom Knott - producer, recording, mixing
- Christian Madden - producer
- Guy Davie - mastering

=== Artwork ===
- Donkey 3 - illustrations
- Deirdre O'Callahan - cover photograph
