= Disclaimer (King Creosote album) =

Studio album by King Creosote
- Released: 2001
- Genre: Folk
- Label: Fence Collective

King Creosote chronology
King Creosote Says "Buy The Bazouki Hair Oil" (2001)	Disclaimer (2001)	Squeezebox Set (2002)

Disclaimer is the seventeenth studio album by King Creosote, released in 2001.

== Track listing ==
1. Carrion Place
2. Waltz Off With The Watch
3. Only Been Gone One Day
4. To Look Like Yachts
5. My Books
6. 6-7-8
7. Why Don't We Go Dancing Anymore?
8. I'm Up A Plum Tree
9. And I Mean 'S'
10. Gender Specific Toys
11. Hitch Hiker's Guide To The Yokey
12. In Need Of A Smile
13. Alias Etcetera
14. John Taylor Starts His Month Away
15. Where's Gordon?
16. Bal-a-leery
17. Pos Pos Pat
18. Bum Chord
