= That Might Be It, Darling =

Studio album by King Creosote
- Released: December 2010
- Genre: Folk, alternative
- Language: English
- Label: Fence

King Creosote chronology
My Nth Bit of Strange in Umpteen Years (2009/2010)	That Might Be It, Darling (2010)	Diamond Mine (2011)

That Might Be It, Darling is a limited edition studio album by Scottish singer-songwriter King Creosote, released in the winter of 2010 on Fence Records. The album was only available to purchase at Creosote's live shows, and is a vinyl-only release. Frequent collaborator, The Pictish Trail, describes the album as "another secret album." A full-band re-recording of the album was released in 2013, entitled That Might Well Be It, Darling.

The final song on the album, "Going Gone", features lead vocals from frequent collaborator, Gummi Bako.

== Background ==
Following Creosote's performance-only album, My Nth Bit of Strange in Umpteen Years, Anderson stated that Fence Records would refrain from releasing digital download albums; "I have a bad feeling about [digital music] – it’s something I don’t feel comfortable with. I am retiring from anything online, and digital music entirely. If you download 1000 songs, how can you value them? I think there is a malaise at the moment – people see music as some sort of service you get when you get broadband and everything around music has been devalued as a result. [...] We are looking to sell fewer units, but to people who are willing to buy items of higher value. It is a case of admitting that if you do not support us, we are gone. The bands that have already done well, your Radioheads and the like, which have used the industry to get an audience, can give their music away all they like. That audience is big and will probably buy tickets to see them live. But I really despair for Fence acts, for new bands – how can they find the money to promote themselves?"

This Might Be It, Darling is Creosote's first release since this statement, and is only available on vinyl, directly from Anderson, at his shows.

== Track listing ==
All songs written by King Creosote, except where noted.

Side A

1. "Single Cheep"
2. "Doubles Underneath"
3. "Near Star, Pole Star"
4. "On the Night of the Bonfire"
5. "I am No Cellist
6. "What Exactly Have You Done?"

Side B

1. "The Right Form"
2. "February 29th"
3. "Ankle Shackles"
4. "Going Gone" (Gummi Bako)

== Personnel ==
- King Creosote - vocals, guitar, various instruments
- HMS Ginafore - appears on "Near Star, Pole Star"
- MC Quake - appears on "Going Gone"
- Gummi Bako - lead vocals on "Going Gone"
- Rich Young - piano ("Near Star, Pole Star", "The Right Form", "February 29th")
