= Silver Columns =

- Years active: 2009-present
- Label: Moshi Moshi
- Members: Adem Ilhan, Johnny Lynch

Silver Columns is the musical collaborative effort of Johnny Lynch, aka The Pictish Trail (of the Fence Collective) and Adem Ilhan, bassist in post-rock outfit Fridge.

After releasing the singles "Brow Beaten" and "Yes, and Dance" anonymously to avoid "preconceptions based on [their] previous work", Silver Columns made their live debut at Fence Records’ annual hootenanny, Homegame in 2010 and continued to appear at festivals and venues throughout the year, including Lovebox 2010 and Glastonbury 2010.

They released the album Yes, and Dance in May 2010 on Moshi Moshi Records. It attracted favourable reviews and draw comparison with Hot Chip.
