= Barbarossa (musician) =

British musician

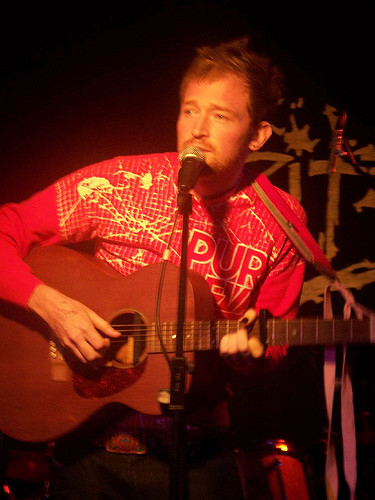
- Barbarossa performing as part of the Fence Collective in late 2006

Background information
- Born: London, England
- Genres: Electronic, Minimal, Synth-Pop, Chillwave, Ambient, Alternative
- Occupations: Singer-songwriter, producer, multi-instrumentalist
- Years active: 2005–present
- Website: barbarossamusic.com

James Mathé, known professionally as Barbarossa, is a British singer-songwriter, producer, and musician known for his minimalist electronic music. Formerly part of the Fence Collective, Mathé first performed as Barbarossa in 2005, releasing his debut EP Sea Like Blood the same year. He is currently signed under the label Memphis Industries.

== Musical style ==
Barbarossa employs a mainly minimalistic style to his music, combining delicate synthesizer sounds, ambient backdrops, and light beats throughout much of his first three albums. His early work was described as having a "folky" style. His music has been described as "electronic soul" and is associated with electronic, synth-pop, chillwave, and alternative musical styles and genres.

== Career ==
=== Fence Records ===
Barbarossa recorded his debut EP Sea Like Blood in 2005, with help from producer Adem. He was part of the Fence Collective in the late 2000s. An early version of his debut album Chemical Campfires made its way to Fence Records, who were keen to be involved. He worked with producer Simon Lord on the album, which was released in early 2007.

=== Memphis Industries (2013–present) ===
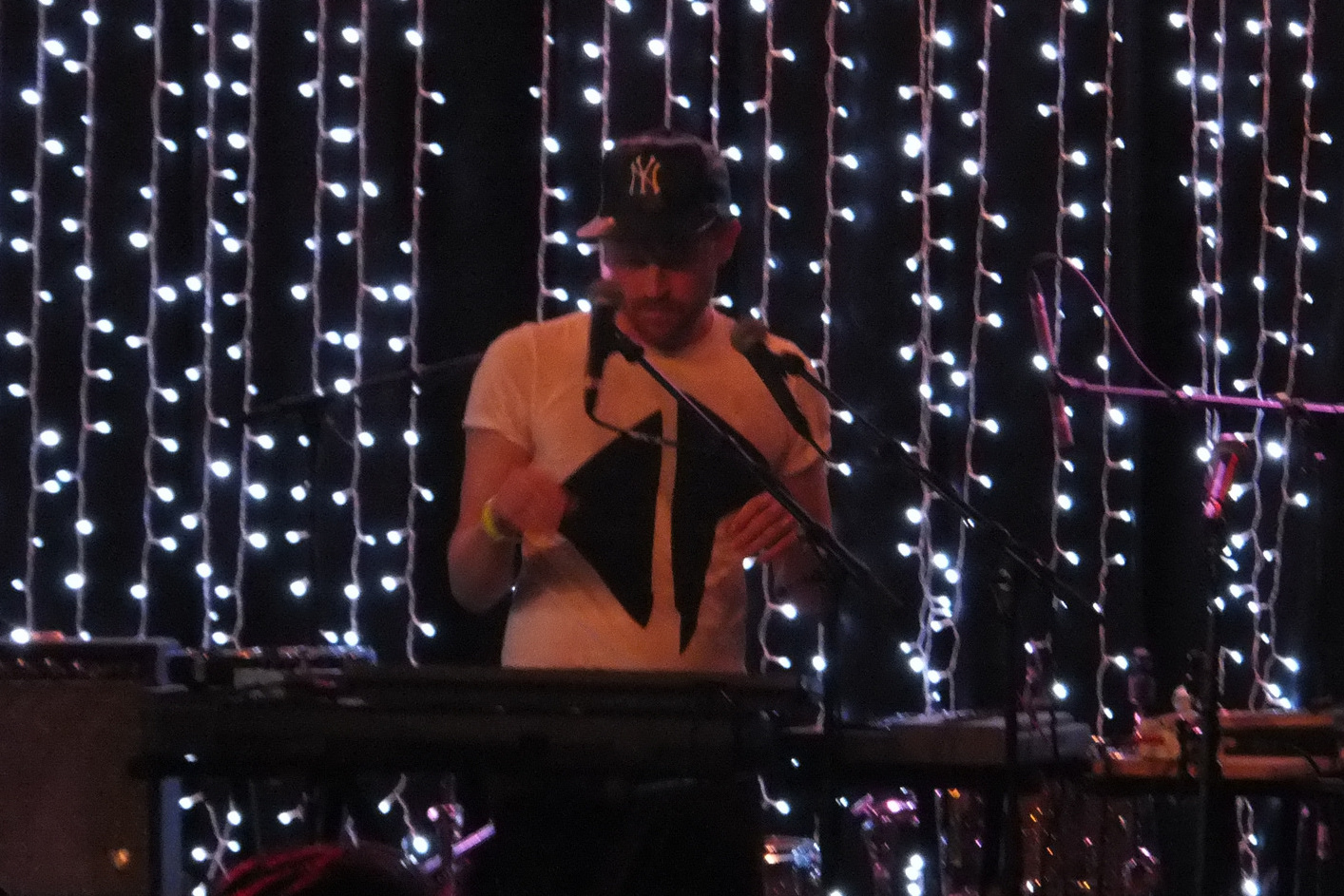
Barbarossa preparing to perform in 2013

Barbarossa joined the music label Memphis Industries in the early 2010s. He released his second album Bloodlines in 2013, which featured the track The Load which was accompanied by a music video and later released as a single.

Barbarossa released his third album Imager in 2015, working with José González, Ash Workman, and Katy Young to create the record. A music video was released for the opening track of the album's namesake, depicting Barbarossa chasing replicas of himself in a forest.

In 2018, Barbarossa returned with his fourth album Lier with producer James Greenwood of Ghost Culture, releasing the track Don't Enter Fear as a teaser in January. This album marked his first work since becoming a father and leaving his home of London, and marked the start of a tour through the UK, France, and Belgium.

In 2019 Barbarossa released the tidal pool tapes (stylised in lowercase). The album was in collaboration with Ghost Culture and featured "stripped back" recordings of his previous songs. He worked with Ghost Culture again for his 2021 album Love Here Listen, describing it as his "most stress-free record to date."

=== Other work ===
Mathé has been involved in a number of projects with other artists, including as a producer on Butterfly Plague E.P. released through Fence Records. Barbarossa was part of the touring lineup of José González's band Junip. He also toured with Johnny Flynn.

==== In popular culture ====
Barbarossa's music has been used in a number of television shows. The TV series Elementary has featured his music, using the track Dark Hopes from the album Imager. The writers for the show tweeted about the song, simply writing "beauty". The song The Load was also used in the ending scene of episode three in season two of the series.

In Season 6, Episode 18 of the sitcom How I Met Your Mother the song Stones from the album Sea Like Blood was used in the ending scene.

== Personal life ==
Mathé was formerly based in his birthplace of London, but had moved to Margate with his family sometime between 2015 and early 2018, following the birth of his first child. He became interested in song-writing as a child, describing his desire to tinker with chords and melodies on the piano as "instinctive."

The name Barbarossa was allegedly inspired by the name of an Italian bottle of wine, which featured artwork of a man with a red beard that reminded Mathé of his grandfather; in Italian, it translates to "red beard".

== Discography ==
=== Albums ===
- Sea Like Blood (2005)
- Chemical Campfires (2007)
- Bloodlines (2013)
- Imager (2015)
- Lier (2018)
- the tidal pool tapes (2019)
- Love Here Listen (2021)

=== Singles and EPs ===
- Aeroplanes (2007)
- The Pallyacho Tapes EP (2009)
- Re: Stacks (Mario & Vidis Ft. Barbarossa) (2012)
- The Load (2013, single)
- Turbine (2013, single)
- Pagliaccio (2013, single)
- Elevator EP (2014)
- Imager (2015, single)
- Don't Enter Fear (2018, single)
- The Mess featuring Johan Hugo (2018, single)
- Hide (2020, streaming only EP)
- Awakeners Awaken Us (2021)

=== Other ===
- Butterfly Plague E.P. (2012, credited as a producer)
