= Faulty Inner Dialogue =

Studio album by Kid Canaveral
- Released: 29 June 2016
- Recorded: November 2014–January 2016, Glenwood Studios, Glasgow, Scotland
- Genre: Alternative rock, electronica, pop
- Length: 40:47
- Label: Lost Map Records
- Producer: Gal, Kid Canaveral

Kid Canaveral chronology
Now That You Are a Dancer (2013)	Faulty Inner Dialogue (2016)

Singles from Faulty Inner Dialogue
- 1. "First We Take Dumbarton" Released: 29 April 2016; 2. "Tragic Satellite" Released: 22 July 2016

Faulty Inner Dialogue is the third studio album by Scottish alternative rock band Kid Canaveral, released on 29 July 2016 by Scottish independent label Lost Map Records.

Professional ratings
Review scores
Source	Rating
The List	4/5 stars
The Scotsman	Very favourable
Drowned in Sound	8/10 stars
The Digital Fix	8/10 stars

== Track listing ==
All songs written by David MacGregor, except where noted.

1. "Gun Fhaireachdain" - 2:57
2. "First We Take Dumbarton" - 3:48
3. "Tragic Satellite" - 3:15
4. "Ten Milligrams" - 1:15
5. "Callous Parting Gift" (Kate Lazda) - 3:04
6. "Pale White Flower" - 3:42
7. "Lifelong Crisis of Confidence" - 3:41
8. "Listen to Me" (Lazda) - 4:22
9. "From Your Bright Room" - 3:56
10. "Twenty Milligrams" - 1:23
11. "Lives Never Lived - 4:41
12. "Reel" - 4:43

== Personnel ==
Kid Canaveral

- David MacGregor – vocals, guitar, keyboards, percussion, programming, field recordings
- Kate Lazda – vocals, guitar, keyboards
- Rose McConnachire – bass, vocals, keyboards
- Scott McMaster – drums, percussion
- Michael Craig - keyboards

Additional personnel

- Gal – engineer, mixing, producer
- Reuben Taylor – mastering
