= Ed Dowie =

English vocalist and songwriter

Ed Dowie is an English vocalist and songwriter from Wimborne in Dorset born 1977.

Dowie was an organist and choirboy as a child. He was previously a member of the Bournemouth-based band Brothers in Sound, who released an album on Regal Recordings in 2000. He studied experimental music for several years before launching a solo career. Signing with Lost Map Records, he released his debut full-length, The Uncle Sold, in 2017. The album's name is an allusion to Kazuo Ishiguro's 1995 novel The Unconsoled.

== Discography ==
- Unpacking My Library EP (2013)
- The Adjustable Arm EP (2014)
- PostMap 01°09 Yungpawel Postcard single (2016)
- The Uncle Sold (2017)
- The Obvious I (2021)
