= I Des =

Studio album by King Creosote
- Released: 3 November 2023
- Length: 83:45
- Label: Domino
- Producer: Kenny Anderson; Derek O'Neill

King Creosote chronology
Astronaut Meets Appleman (2016)	I Des (2023)

I Des is the fiftieth studio album by Scottish indie folk musician King Creosote, released on 3 November 2023 through Domino Recording Company. It is Kenny Anderson's first release as King Creosote in seven years and received acclaim from critics.

== Background ==
The album is King Creosote's first release in seven years, following Astronaut Meets Appleman (2016). The title is a reference to Anderson's co-producer Derek O'Neill, also known as Des Lawson. I Des contains a 13-minute suite titled "Please Come Back I Will Listen, I Will Behave, I Will Toe the Line", and the 36-minute "Drone in B♯", with B♯ being an enharmonic equivalent to the key of C.

== Critical reception ==
Professional ratings
Aggregate scores
Source	Rating
Metacritic	84/100
Review scores
Source	Rating
AllMusic	4/5 stars
Mojo	4/5 stars
MusicOMH	4/5 stars
The Skinny	4/5 stars
Uncut	8/10

I Des received a score of 84 out of 100 on review aggregator Metacritic based on seven critics' reviews, indicating "universal acclaim". Uncut felt that "the manic, galloping 'Susie Mullen' proves Anderson's still got a nose for fun", while Mojo remarked, "if life's what you make it, here Anderson makes it sound very beautiful indeed". The Skinny's Mia Boffey described it as "a largely jubilant and life-affirming meditation on life and mortality. A triumph for Anderson, it's a more than worthy addition to his extensive and revered body of work".

Timothy Monger of AllMusic stated that the album "feels a bit like a composite of Anderson's various attributes, a wild mid-career overview imbued with the veteran presence of an artist who has always sounded like an old soul" as well as "an appropriately ambitious celebration of his first 25 years". Reviewing the album for MusicOMH, Steven Johnson summarised I Des as a "slowburning set of songs full of delicate beauty and affecting, idiosyncratic warmth".

== Track listing ==
All tracks are produced by Kenny Anderson and Derek O'Neill; all tracks are mixed by Derek O'Neill.

I Des track listing
No.	Title	Writer(s)	Length
1.	"It's Sin That's Got Its Hold Upon Us"	Kenny Anderson	3:51
2.	"Blue Marbled Elm Trees"	Anderson	5:03
3.	"Burial Bleak"	Anderson	5:48
4.	"Dust"	Anderson	4:09
5.	"Walter de la Nightmare"	Anderson; Derek O'Neill	4:11
6.	"Susie Mullen"	Anderson; Gavin Brown.; Ziggy Campbell; O'Neill	4:49
7.	"Love Is a Curse"	Anderson	1:59
8.	"Ides"	Anderson; O'Neill	4:05
9.	"Please Come Back I Will Listen, I Will Behave, I Will Toe the Line"	Anderson; O'Neill	13:16
10.	"Drone in B♯"	Anderson; Brown; Campbell; Hannah Fisher; Mairearad Green; Gordon MacLean; Sorren MacLean; Andy Robinson	36:34
Total length:			83:45

== Charts ==
Chart performance for I Des
Chart (2023)	Peak position
Scottish Albums (OCC)	3
UK Albums (OCC)	61
UK Album Downloads (OCC)	19
UK Independent Albums (OCC)	4
