= Found (band) =

Experimental pop band from Edinburgh, Scotland

FOUND
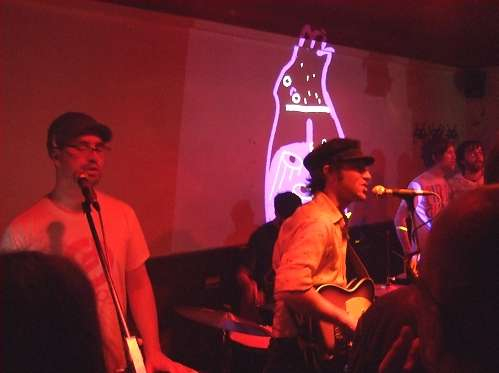
- Found in concert (6 December 2008 in Hamburg, Astra-Stube)

Background information
- Origin: Edinburgh, Scotland
- Genres: Folktronica; Experimental rock Electronica; Freak Folk; Noise
- Years active: 2001–present
- Labels: Surface Pressure Records; Creeping Bent; Aufgeladen Und Bereit; Fence Collective
- Members: Ziggy Campbell; Tommy Perman; Kev Sim; Alan Stockdale; Gavin Sutherland
- Website: http://foundtheband.com/

FOUND are a Scottish experimental pop band and arts collective from Edinburgh, Scotland. The founding members, Ziggy Campbell, Tommy Perman and Kevin Sim met while studying fine art at Gray's School of Art in Aberdeen. They began working on sound art installations together whilst in their final year at college in 2001. Each project they do is given a catalogue number and documented on their website.

In 2005 they formed a band in order to play live music at the openings of their Stop Look Listen exhibition tour (which toured from Peacock Visual Arts, Aberdeen to The Meffan, Forfar and the Royal Scottish Academy in Edinburgh).

They recruited the keyboardist Gavin Sutherland in 2005, and then Alan Stockdale joined on drums and percussion at the beginning of 2006.

In 2006, FOUND released their debut single, "Mullokian" (SP4502), and album, Found Can Move (SPCD01), on Tommy Perman's label Surface Pressure Records. They released two more singles from that album: "Static 68" on the Scottish label Creeping Bent and "Synth Like Minds" on the Hamburg based label, Aufgeladen Und Bereit.

In October 2006, FOUND took part in the inaugural BBC Electric Proms with an unusual collaboration with multimedia comedians, (nobleandsilver).

In 2007, FOUND were commissioned to create a major sound installation to commemorate the 20th anniversary of the Edinburgh Sculpture Workshop. They produced a piece called Etiquette, which was funded by the PRSFoundation's award for new music and uses some of the technology developed by Reactable. Etiquette was displayed at the Edinburgh Sculpture Workshop's Magazine 07 exhibition, during the Edinburgh Festival Fringe in Newhaven, Edinburgh.

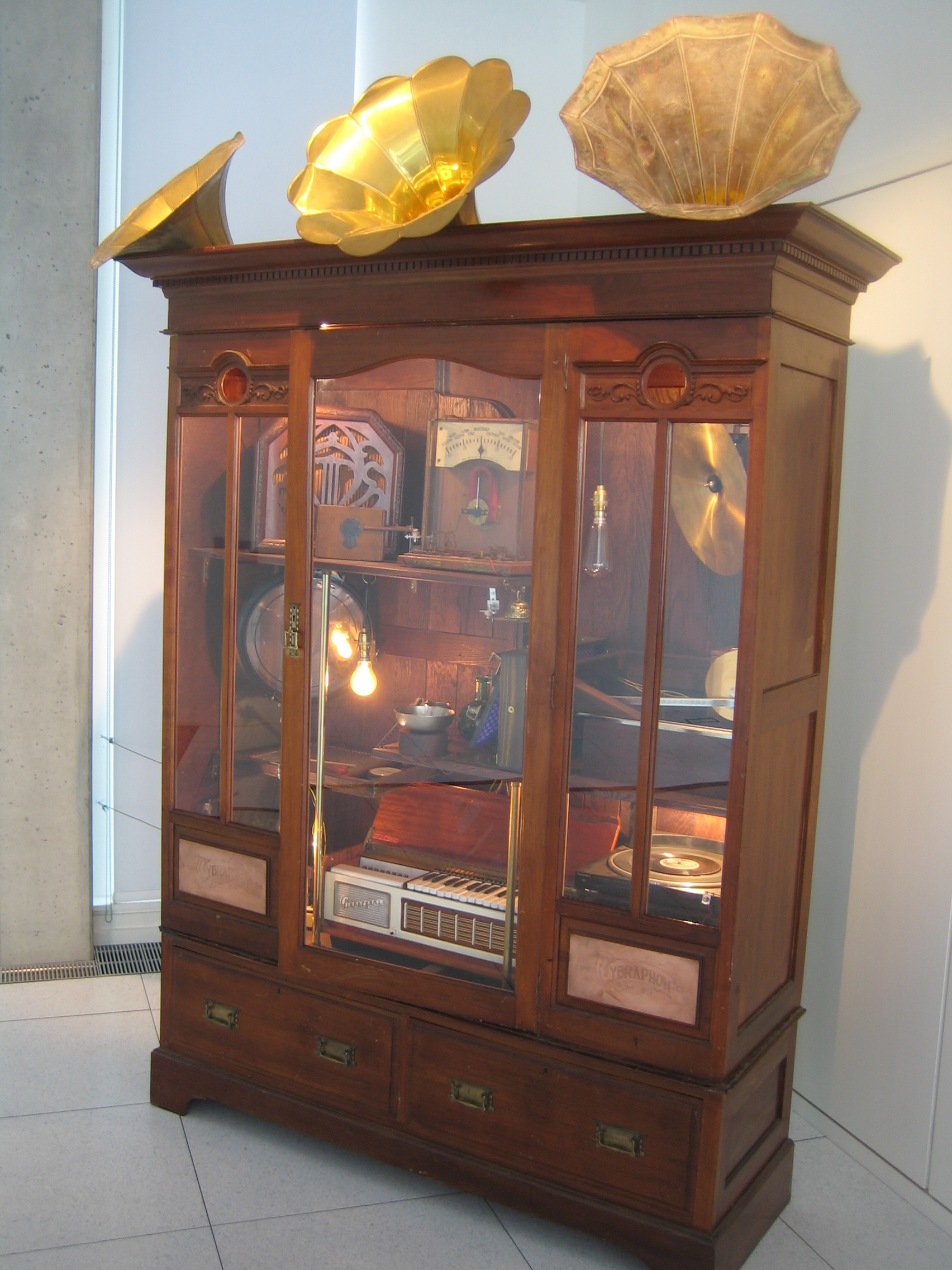
Cybraphon, an autonomous robot band in a box created by Edinburgh-based artist collective FOUND.

In 2009, together with Simon Kirby from the University of Edinburgh, FOUND created Cybraphon, an "autonomous emotional robot band" in a wardrobe, for which they won a BAFTA.

FOUND's second album, This Mess We Keep Reshaping (FNC-085), was released on Fence Records (also see the Fence Collective).

The first two FOUND albums have been supported by the Scottish Arts Council.

The group released their third album Factorycraft on Chemikal Underground in March 2011. After some line-up changes, the group, now a duo of Campbell and Sim released their fourth album CLONING in November 2015. The group released their fifth studio album Terra Nova on 1 July 2016.

== Discography ==
- Found Can Move (2006)
- This Mess We Keep Reshaping (2007) (Fence Records)
- Factorycraft (2011) (Chemikal Underground)
- CLONING (2015) (Chemikal Underground)
- Terra Nova (2016) (Chemikal Underground)
