= Lost Map Records =

Lost Map
- Founded: 2013
- Founder: Johnny Lynch
- Genre: Alternative; Folk; Pop; Electronica
- Country of origin: Scotland
- Location: Isle of Eigg, Scotland
- Official website: http://www.lostmap.com

Lost Map is a British independent record label set up in 2013 by Johnny Lynch. The label was established following the dissolution of Fence Records Limited in August 2013.

== History ==
After 10 years of working for and subsequently managing Fence Records, Lynch took the decision to leave the label in August 2013, following his business partner Kenny Anderson's decision to quit the label in April 2013.

With Lynch's departure from Fence, the entire active label roster followed him to his new venture, Lost Map Records, with Rozi Plain, Monoganon, Kid Canaveral, Randolph's Leap, eagleowl, Seamus Fogarty, and The Pictish Trail making up the initial roster of the new imprint.

The first release on the label was made available in the form of a postcard at the Green Man Festival in August 2013, with a digital download code for a seven track compilation of artists on the label. The compilation is also available on the Lost Map website in exchange for subscribing to the email list. The first full release on the label will be the second album by Monoganon, F A M I L Y.

== Artists ==
=== Current roster ===
List of current artists, adapted from the Lost Map Records website.

A

- Acolyte
- Afterlands
- Alexia Avina

B

- ballboy
- Bas Jan
- Susan Bear
- Blind Yeo
- Both Hands

D

- Alabaster dePlume
- Ed Dowie

E

- Eagleowl
- Callum Easter
- Faith Eliott
- Amy May Ellis

F

- Fell
- Martha Ffion
- Firestations
- Seamus Fogarty
- Free Love

G

- Isa Gordon

H

- Happy Spendy
- Dominie Hooper
- Victoria Hume

I

- Ichi
- Insect Heroes
- Ishaaq Aarkistra

K

- Kid Canaveral
- Kinbote

L

- Lazy Day
- L.T. Leif
- Molly Linen

M

- Manuela
- Maranta
- Clémentine March
- Gordon McIntyre
- Curtis Miles
- Monoganon
- Jenny Moore's Mystic Business

P

- Painting
- The Pictish Trail
- A.R. Pinewood
- Rozi Plain
- Herbert Powell

R

- Randolph's Leap

S

- Savage Mansion

T

- Tuff Love
- Two White Cranes

=== Former artists ===
D

- Rachel Dadd

G

- The GN Band
- Good Dog

H

- Hairband

K

- Arthur King

L

- Flo Lines
- Jason Lytle

O

- Owen & the Eyeballs

S

- SDF
- Sulka

V

- RKB Vitesse

W

- Jamie Whitby-Coles
- Woodpigeon
- Sara Woolf

== Releases ==
Year	Release date	Title	Artist	Catalogue No.	Format
2013	16 August	PostMap 00°1 Sampler	Various	PostMap 00°1 16' 8.2013	Postcard & Digital Download
2013	28 October	F A M I L Y	Monoganon	LAT 00°1 28'10.2013"	Vinyl, Fanzine, CD & Digital Download
2014	17 February	Light of the Moon	Randolph's Leap	PostMap 00°8 17'2.2014	Postcard & Digital Download
2014	2 May	Junk E.P.	Tuff Love	GRAT 00°2 2'5.2014"	Vinyl w/ Lyric Map & Digital Download
