= Propaganda (indie club night) =

Propaganda is an Independent music club night spanning across 22 different areas in the UK, Ireland, Australia and Brazil. It is known to be the biggest club night of its kind in the UK in reference to the number of people who attend each week. Propaganda was created by DJ Dan while at Bristol university, claiming there was no alternative club night in the area at that time. The night first started at The Cooler on Park Street in Bristol before it out grew the capacity and had to move to Level Nightclub on Park Row. Propaganda has previously had DJs such as Lily Allen, The Vaccines, The Libertines, Ellie Golding, Rizzle Kicks and Zane Lowe at their events.

== Venues and places ==
- Aberdeen - Unit 51
- Bath - Moles
- Birmingham - O2 Academy Birmingham
- Bristol - The Fleece
- Cardiff - Clwb Ifor Bach
- Cheltenham - MooMoo
- Cambridge - Fez Club
- Dundee - Church
- Edinburgh - The Liquid Room
- Glasgow - Queen Margaret Union
- Lincoln - Engine Shed
- London - O2 Academy Islington
- Leeds - Propaganda's Attic
- Manchester - 5th Avenue
- Newcastle - Illegitimate
- Norwich - Waterfront
- Oxford - Purple Turtle
- Reading - Q Club
- Sheffield - Plug
- Sydney - World Bar
- São Paulo - Cine Joia
- Southampton - Junk

== Previous guest DJs ==
Propaganda is known for having high-profile figures & bands in the music industry to DJ at their nights. Previous guest DJs include Zane Lowe, Lily Allen, Bloc Party, Pendulum & The Pigeon Detectives. Recently guests have included The Vaccines, Greg James and The Libertines.
