= Flick the Vs =

Album by King Creosote

Studio album by King Creosote
- Released: 20 April 2009
- Genre: Indie folk
- Labels: Domino; Fence
- Producers: Kenny Anderson; Paul Savage; Christian Madden; Jon Hopkins; Steve Mason

King Creosote chronology
| They Flock Like Vulcans to See Old Jupiter Eyes on His Home Craters (2008) | Flick the Vs (2009) | My Nth Bit of Strange in Umpteen Years (2009/2010) |

Professional ratings
Review scores
| Source | Rating |
|---|---|
| BBC | (positive) |
| Planet Sound | 6/10 stars |
| The Skinny | 4/5 stars |

Flick the Vs is a studio album by Scottish singer-songwriter King Creosote, released on 20 April 2009 on Domino Records and Fence Records.

A limited-edition version of the album includes a five-track bonus disc.

The Fence Collective official website wrote the following upon release:

The King returns with his millionth album, and comeback for Domino, Flick The Vs. Ten tracks teaming with dry wit, suave one liners, stunning poise, great hair and a nice ass – all held together by that voice, accordion, guitar and drum machines. Produced by Paul Savage at Chem19, and recorded with Jon Hopkins, The Earlies, Steve Mason and some Fence Collective chums – it's got everything that you could possibly want from a King Creosote record but were afraid to dream of.

== Track listing ==
All songs by Kenny Anderson, except where noted.

1. "No One Had it Better"
2. "Two Frocks at a Wedding"
3. "Camels Swapped for Wives"
4. "No Way She Exists"
5. "Fell an Ox"
6. "Coast on By" (Anderson/Steve Mason)
7. "Nothing Rings True"
8. "Curtain Craft"
9. "Rims"
10. "Saw Circular Prowess"

=== Bonus disc ===
Songs written by the Fence Collective, except where noted.

1. "Here On My Own"
2. "Diamantina Drover" (Hugh MacDonald)
3. "Admission #9"
4. "I Awoke"
5. "I Believe It's True"

== Personnel ==
- King Creosote – vocals, guitar, electric bass, keyboards, percussion, accordion, synths, piano, harmonium, mandolin, hammer dulcimer
- OTF – drums (tracks 1 and 3), drum machines (track 9)
- The Janitor – drums, drum machines (track 2), percussion (track 1)
- Captain Geeko – African drums (tracks 2 and 3), drums (tracks 3 and 9)
- Le Baron Rouge – electric bass (track 2)
- Albany – samples (track 2)
- Sorren's Dad – double bass (tracks 3 and 9)
- Young Richard – drums (tracks 4, 8 and 10), xylophone (track 8)
- Young Neil – electric bass (tracks 4, 8 and 10), electric guitar (tracks 4 and 10), violas (track 10)
- Von Supponatime – Moog synthesizer (track 4), piano (tracks 8 and 10), organ (track 10)
- Nicolai Chestikov – baritone sax (tracks 4 and 8)
- Steve Mason – drum machines, loops (track 5), drums, keyboards, vocals (track 6)
- Jon Hopkins – keyboards, xylophone, piano (track 5)
- Gaz – tuba (track 8)
- Pip Dylan – gitanjo (track 9)
- Paul Savage – producer, engineer, mixing
