= Bombshell (King Creosote album) =

Studio album by King Creosote
- Released: 10 September 2007
- Genre: Folk; pop
- Label: 679; Names

King Creosote chronology
KC Rules OK (2005)	Bombshell (2007)	They Flock Like Vulcans to See Old Jupiter Eyes on His Home Craters (2008)

Professional ratings
Review scores
Source	Rating
The Guardian	4/5 stars
The Independent	3/5 stars
The Times	4/5 stars
Yahoo Music UK	5/10 stars

Bombshell is an album by King Creosote, released in 2007.

Regarding the album, Kenny Anderson states that:

The new ones are pretty much my insecurities or paranoia of whatever I'm going through at this part of my life. I've got a daughter now, she's 8 and there's a song "Church as Witness" about a fall out she and I had, and yeah, there's others coming from a sort of older period in time just about all different things really. They are some comedy things on there. A lot of it I suppose is relationship based and then I suppose there's "You've No clue Do You?" which is a kind of a "who-done-it?" in the grand "Cluedo" tradition.

== Track listing ==
1. Leslie
2. Home In A Sentence
3. You've No Clue Do You
4. Cowardly Custard
5. Church As Witness
6. There's None Of That
7. Nooks
8. Now Drop Your Bombshell
9. Admiral
10. Cockle Shell
11. Spystick
12. At The WAL
13. And The Racket They Made
