= Shouting at Wildlife =

Studio album by Kid Canaveral
- Released: 5 July 2010 (Straight to Video Records); 25 July 2011 (Fence Records)
- Recorded: May 2009 – January 2010 4th Street Studios, Glasgow, Scotland
- Genre: Indiepop; Powerpop; Post-Pop; Alternative
- Length: 38.06
- Language: Scottish English; Scots
- Label: Straight to Video Records (2010)/Fence Records (2011)
- Producer: Gal and Kid Canaveral

Kid Canaveral chronology
Shouting at Wildlife (2010)	Now That You are a Dancer (2013)

Singles from Shouting at Wildlife
- 1. "Smash Hits" Released: 5 March 2007; 2. "Couldn't Dance" Released: 22 June 2008; 3. "Left and Right" Released: 19 October 2009; 4. "You Only Went Out to Get Drunk Last Night" Released: 31 May 2010; 5. "And Another Thing!!" Released: 11 July 2011

Shouting at Wildlife is the debut album from the Indiepop band Kid Canaveral, originally released on 5 July 2010 on Straight to Video Records and, due to the success of the initial pressing, given a wider re-release on Fence Records on 25 July 2011 on Vinyl and CD.

== Production ==
Following the release of the band's fourth single "I Don't Have the Heart for This" in December 2008, Kid Canaveral parted company with their original drummer Dan Sheehy. In between appointing Scott McMaster as the permanent fourth member, the group embarked on a UK tour with Clark Geddes behind the drums, before starting to work on what would become Shouting At Wildlife. However, during this time MacGregor was suffering from "severe writer's block" and was struggling to satisfactorily complete any songs, until an 11-month drought ended in March 2009.

The band started to record with engineer Gal (engineer of Quietly Now!, amongst other things) at Fourth Street Studios in Glasgow, in May 2009, recording the basic elements of "Good Morning", "And Another Thing!!", "Left and Right" and "On Occasion". With a new sense of purpose the band wrote and completed material in between the studio sessions (and some in the studio) and released an E.P. called Left and Right in October 2009, which also gave the band a chance to head out and road test new material on their first UK tour with Scott.

The record was finished and mixed in January 2010, and released by the band's label Straight to Video Records on 5 July 2010.

== Release and promotion ==
To promote the album, the band released their debut single, "Smash Hits", on 3 March 2007. The single was remixed with a re-recorded vocal at Chem 19 Studios for the digital download version and album version of the single. A video for the song was made by the BBC for "The Music Show" and was broadcast on BBC 2 Scotland in November 2006.

The fourth single, "You Only Went Out to Get Drunk Last Night", was released on 31 May 2010. The band hosted an album launch at The Roxy in Edinburgh on 3 July 2010, two days before the official release of the album. The show was a sell out, and was the first date of a UK tour in support of the album. During the second half of 2010, the band toured the UK extensively and played a number of festivals and recorded a live session for BBC Radio Scotland in support of the album.

Kid Canaveral completed a short tour of the United States in March 2011 including a number of shows at the SxSW festival in Austin, Texas. Kid Canaveral was filmed before and during SxSW as part of a BBC Artworks documentary about the festival. The final single to be released from the album was "And Another Thing!!". This coincided with the re-release of the album and a number of festival appearances in 2011 in the UK, most notably at T in the Park (on the BBC Introducing stage), The Edge Festival and the Belladrum Festival. The final leg of the promotional tour for Shouting At Wildlife will include further festival dates and two UK tours, which will take the band to the end of 2011.

== Reception ==
Professional ratings
Review scores
Source	Rating
The Skinny	4/5 stars
The List	4/5 stars
BBC Radio 1	BBC Introducing Album of the Month
Glasgow Herald	Very Positive
Manic Pop Thrills	5/5 stars
17 Seconds	4.5/5 stars

The album received universally positive reviews, with The Skinny describing Shouting at Wildlife as "a thrilling, uplifting and generally all-round spiffing combination of indie-pop skills, lyrical wit, and choruses sung through smiles" and The List praised the record for being "packed with singalong melodies, frisky jangles and a real sense of purpose. A jubilant and skilful racket." The album was BBC Radio 1 Session in Scotland's Album of the Month for July 2010 and the album featured at, or near the top of a number of end of year lists and polls.

The album was the best selling album of 2010 in Scotland's biggest independent music retailer, Avalanche Records, ahead of more established acts such as Belle and Sebastian, The National and Arcade Fire. The word-of-mouth success of the initial run of the album led to it being re-released by Fence Records on Vinyl and CD.

Upon the re-release of Shouting at Wildlife by Fence Records, the Glasgow Herald described the album as "a Scottish pop classic [that] should be mandatory in every record collection in the country" and Vic Galloway and Tom Morton featured it as their 'Album of the Week' on their respective BBC Radio Scotland shows, in its week of release.

== Track listing ==
All songs written by MacGregor, except as noted.

1. "Good Morning" – 3:29
2. "You Only Went Out to Get Drunk Last Night" – 4:12
3. "Left and Right" – 2:55 (Lazda)
4. "Cursing Your Apples" – 3:05 (MacGregor/Lazda)
5. "Smash Hits" – 2:57
6. "Quiet Things are Quiet Now" – 3:07 (Lazda)
7. "And Another Thing!!" – 4:47
8. "On Occasion" – 2:30 (MacGregor/Lazda/Sheehy)
9. "Talk and Talk" – 3:25 (Lazda/MacGregor/McConnachie)
10. "Couldn't Dance" – 3:19
11. "Her Hair Hangs Down" – 2:20
12. "Good Morning (reprise)" – 2:00

== Personnel ==
- David MacGregor - Vocals, Guitars, Keys, Moog, Beats, Percussion
- Kate Lazda - Vocals, Guitars, Keys, Melodica, Beats, Percussion
- Rose McConnachire - Bass Guitar, Vocals, Glockenspiel
- Scott McMaster - Drumkit, Vocals, Percussion
- Gal - Engineer, Mixing and Production
- Rich Amino - Mastering
- Reuben Taylor - Vinyl Re-master
- Andy Miller - Engineer ('Couldn't Dance' and 'Smash Hits')
- Ali Davison - Keys, Viola
- Dan Sheehy - Drumkit (on 'Smash Hits' and 'Couldn't Dance')
- Clarke Geddes - Drumkit (on 'Good Morning', 'On Occasion', 'And Another Thing' and 'Left and Right')
- The Wild Life Choir - Laura Doherty, Kate E Lazda, Rose against the Machine, Katy McSkimming, Jessica Smith, Arlene Watts
