= Kenny and Beth's Musakal Boat Rides =

Studio album by King Creosote
- Released: 2003
- Genre: Folk
- Length: 47:10
- Label: Fence; Domino

King Creosote chronology
Kenny and Beth's Musakal Boat Rides (2003)	Rocket D.I.Y. (2005)

Kenny and Beth's Musakal Boat Rides is the first album by King Creosote released by Fence Records and Domino Records, however far from his debut release on Fence alone. It was Anderson's first studio album that wasn't distributed on a CD-R. The album made No. 5 in Rough Trade's top 100 albums of 2003.

== Track listing ==
1. "Lonepigeon's Wineglass Finale" - 1:37
2. "Homeboy" - 3:49
3. "Pulling Up Creels" - 4:00
4. "Turps" - 3:10
5. "Spokes" - 2:55
6. "Counselling" - 1:34
7. "So Forlorn" - 3:47
8. "Harper's Dough" - 2:20
9. "Lavender Moon" (Een 'Ian' Anderson [a.k.a. Pip Dylan]) - 3:55
10. "Space" - 5:03
11. "Meantime" - 3:43
12. "Missionary" - 3:14
13. "A Friday Night in New York" - 8:03
