= King Creosote =

Scottish singer-songwriter

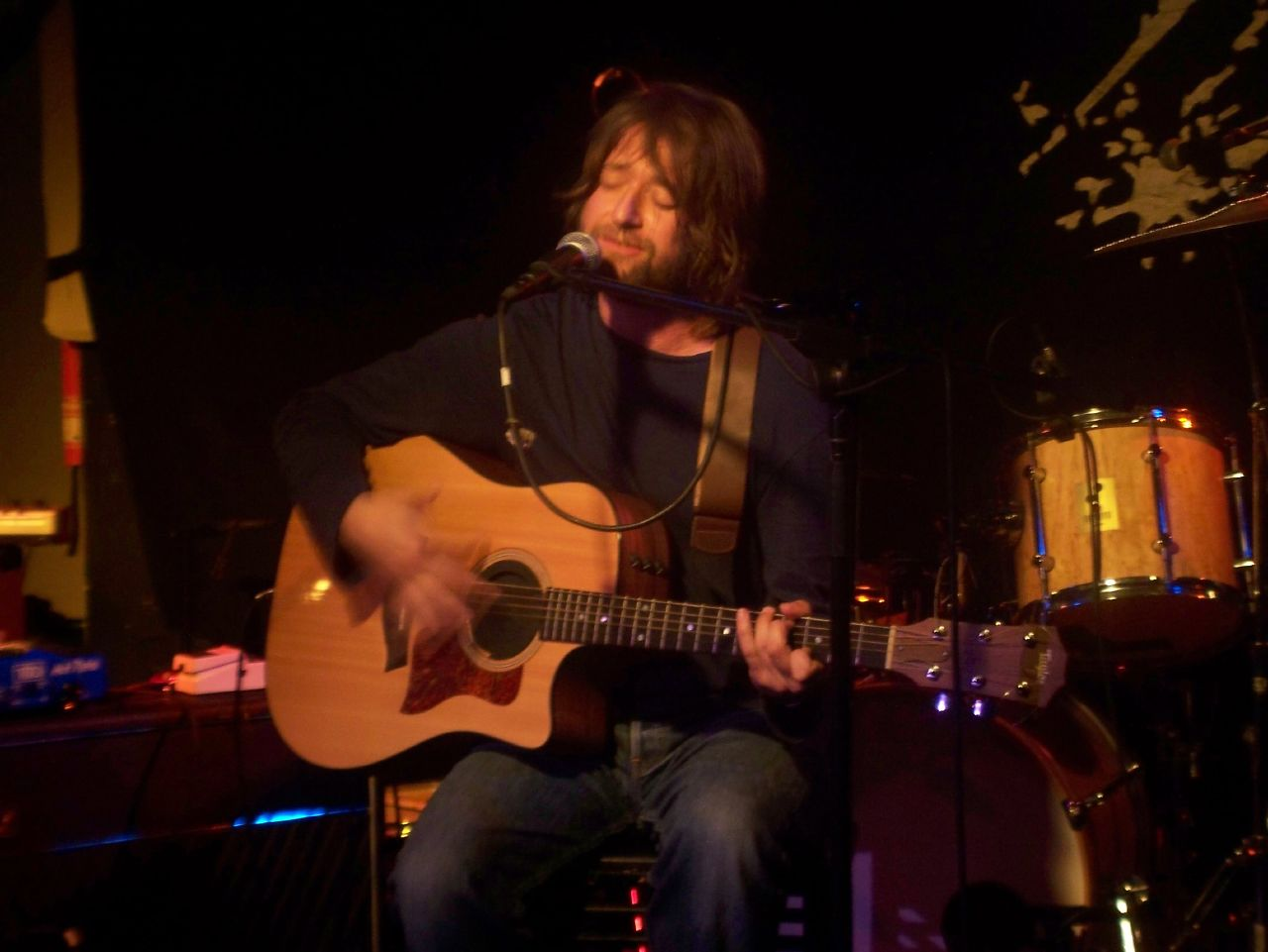
- King Creosote performing at The Spitz, 2006

Background information
- Born: Kenneth Anderson; 1967 (age 58–59)
- Origin: Fife, Scotland
- Labels: Fence; Domino; 679; Double Six; Boer
- Website: kingcreosote.com

Kenny Anderson (born January 1967), known primarily by his stage name King Creosote, is an independent singer-songwriter from Fife, Scotland. To date, Anderson has released over forty albums, with his latest full length, I DES, released in 2023. Anderson is also a member of Scottish-Canadian band The Burns Unit. In 2011, Anderson's collaborative album with Jon Hopkins, Diamond Mine, was nominated for the Mercury Prize and the Scottish Album of the Year Award. Astronaut Meets Appleman was also longlisted for the Scottish Album of the Year Award.

== Musical career ==
After having featured in Scottish bands Skuobhie Dubh Orchestra and Khartoum Heroes, in 1995 Kenny Anderson launched the Fence record label and began recording albums under the name King Creosote.

King Creosote was one of the original artists to contribute a t-shirt design for the Yellow Bird Project charity initiative, back in 2006. Anderson's design features an accordion, inscribed with the name "FENCE"; a reference to his DIY record label collective.

Anderson founded Fence Records alongside Johnny Lynch, but stepped back from day-to-day running of the label in 2010.

In recent years, Anderson has teamed up with Domino Records who have co-released some of his albums. He also spent some time on Warner subsidiary, 679, which gave him major label backing for the first time. His increasing frustration with the music industry and how digital recordings are becoming throwaway commodities led him to release his material in small, vinyl only runs which were largely only available at concerts.

To this end, KC Rules OK was re-released in 2006 with different versions of some songs, and a version of the album called "Chorlton and the Wh'earlies" recorded with The Earlies was available with some purchases. Bombshell was released with an additional disc, a DVD film of King Creosote and friends on tour.

In the 2007 film Hallam Foe two of his songs, "The Someone Else" and "King Bubbles in Sand", were featured.

In late 2009, Anderson released a new studio album Flick the Vs, and crafted a performance only album, entitled My Nth Bit of Strange in Umpteen Years. Anderson also contributed to the Cold Seeds collaborative album along with Frances Donnelly of Animal Magic Tricks, and Neil Pennycook and Pete Harvey from Meursault; which was released on the Edinburgh-based indie label Song, by Toad Records. Anderson, Donnelly and Pennycook all wrote songs for the project, which all four performers then recorded together; each singer often taking the lead vocal role on a song written by another of the artists. The album was given a special limited release at the Fence Records Homegame Festival in Anstruther, Fife in March 2010, before a general release was announced for June 2010.

In 2011, Anderson attended the SxSW Music Festival and played a number of shows, two of which featured fellow Scottish attendees Kid Canaveral as his backing band. The same year, Anderson released Diamond Mine, a collaborative album with electronica composer Jon Hopkins, to critical acclaim. The album was nominated for the Mercury Prize, with Anderson stating, "It feels like this is the beginning of something. And to feel that so far down the line, after putting out forty effing albums, oh my God! It means, I can still do this, it's not over." The duo subsequently released an EP, Honest Words.

In 2013, Anderson released That Might Well Be It, Darling, a full-band re-recording of his limited edition vinyl album That Might Be It, Darling.

In 2014, Anderson created the soundtrack for a film about Scotland for the 2014 Commonwealth Games. From Scotland with Love is a poetic film exploring the history of the country, compiled entirely from archive footage with no commentary or narration. Speaking to The Guardian about the creative process, Anderson explained that the film was a long way from the typical "tartan, Highland Games, shortbread kind of tourist film". It was broadcast on BBC Scotland in June.

In 2025, King Creosote embarked on a new tour called 'Any Storm in a Teacup' During the tour he included a new track entitled "The Good Guys", outlining his support for far-right figures and conspiracy theorists such as Alex Jones, Tucker Carlson and Candace Owens.

== Personal life ==
Anderson's brothers are also musicians: Ian Anderson (known as Pip Dylan) and Gordon Anderson (Lone Pigeon) – who was a founding member of The Beta Band and is lead singer and main songwriter with The Aliens. The three frequently collaborate at live shows and on album releases. He also has a sister living in Australia.

Anderson lives in Fife.

== Discography ==
=== Releases on CD-R ===
- Queen of Brush County (Fence FNC 01, 1998)
- Rain Weekend (Fence FNC 02, 1998)
- Inner Crail to Outer Space (Fence FNC 03, 1998)
- Or Is It? (Fence FNC 04, 1998)
- Gink Scootere (Fence FNC 05, 1998)
- 1999: An Endless Round Of Balls (Parties And Social Events) (Fence FNC 06, 1999)
- Wednesday (Fence FNC 07, 1999)
- Jacques De Fence (Fence FNC JDF, 1999)
- I Am 9 (Fence FNC 09, 1999)
- Planet Eggz (Fence FNC 10, 1999)
- Or Was It? (Fence FNC 11, 2000)
- 12 O'Clock on the Dot (Fence FNC 12, 2000)
- Stinks (Fence FNC 13, 2000)
- G (Fence FNC 14, 2001)
- Radge Weekend Starts Here (Fence FNC 15, 2001)
- King Creosote Says "Buy The Bazouki Hair Oil" (Fence FNC 16, 2001)
- Disclaimer (Fence FNC 17, 2001)
- Squeezebox Set (Fence FNC 18 to 22, 2002) – 5 album boxset containing:-
  Fair Dubhs
  Favourite Girl
  Whelk Of Arse
  More Afraid Of Plastic
  Losing It on the Gyles (Limited release)
- Now (Nearly 36) (Fence PF A01, 2003)
- Psalm Clerk (Fence FNC 23, 2003)
- Ideal Rumpus Room Guide (Fence PF B03, 2003)
- Sea Glass (Fence FNC 24, 2004)
- Red On Green (Fence FNC 26, 2004) (Released as "Kwaing Creasite")
- Three Nuns (Fence PF B10, 2004)
- Kompanion Çet +1 (Fence PF C06, 2004)
- Balloons (Fence PF D01, 2005)

=== Albums released on CD, LP and/or digitally ===
- Kenny and Beth's Musakal Boat Rides (Fence FNC K&B, also Domino Recording Co, 2003)
- Rocket D.I.Y. (Fence FNC 27, also Domino Recording Co, 2005)
- Loose Tea on his Wynd (Fence FNC 28, 2004)
- Vintage Quays (Fence FNC 29, 2004)
- KC Rules OK (Names/679, 2005)
- Bombshell (Names/679, 2007)
- Dumps Vol.1 (2007) (Limited release for 2007 purchasers of the latest release of the Squeezebox set)
- They Flock Like Vulcans to See Old Jupiter Eyes on His Home Craters (FNC 34, 2008)
- Flick the Vs (Domino/Fence, 2009)
- That Might Be It, Darling (Fence, 2010) (Limited vinyl release)
- Diamond Mine (Domino, 2011) (With Jon Hopkins)
- Thrawn (2011) (Compilation)
- That Might Well Be It, Darling (Domino, 2013) (Re-recording of That Might Be It, Darling)
- Sure & Steadfast (Boer Records BOER 002, 2013) (Album released in support of the Scottish Fisheries Museum Boats Club in Anstruther)
- From Scotland with Love (Domino, 2014)
- 3 on This Island (Fence FNC 36LP, 2014)
- Loose Tea on His Wynd (Fence FNC 28, 2015 vinyl edition of 2004 CD)
- Småvulgär (Fence FNC 37, 2015)
- King Creosote & The Queens of Brush County (Fence FNC QNB, 2016)
- Astronaut Meets Appleman (Domino, 2016)
- Lino (Fence FNC38LP, 2017)
- Greetings from Hamilton, Canada (Fence FNC 39, 2017)
- Your Henchmen (Fence FNC42, 2018)
- I Des (Domino, 2023)
- Any Port in a Storm (Fence Records, 2025)

=== EPs ===
- Honest Words (Domino, 2011) (with Jon Hopkins)
- Diamond Mine (Jubilee EP) (vinyl only) (2012) (with Jon Hopkins)
- I Learned from the Gaels (vinyl only) (2012)
- To Deal with Things (vinyl only) (2012)
- It Turned Out for the Best (vinyl only) (2012)
- Analogue Catalogue (vinyl only) (Boer Records, 2013)

=== Singles ===
- "So Forlorn" (7", released on vinyl only) (BEBOP 35, 2002)
- "Lavender Moon" (split vinyl only 7" single with "Love Your Present" by Pip Dylan) (FU 029, 2003)
- "Bootprints" (7" 2005)
- "Favourite Girl" (10", vinyl only) (IAMNAMES 10, 2005)
- "6 7 8" (7" 2005)
- "You've No Clue, Do You?" (7" 2007)
- "Home in a Sentence" (7" 2007)
- "They Flock Like Vulcans" (7") (Fence Records [FNC-SECRET7-003], 2008)
- "Homerun and a Vow" (split 7" single with "Nowhere Near Half Done" by Kid Canaveral) (Fence Records [FNC-SECRET7-011], 2011)
- "Susie Mullen / Walter de la Nightmare" (Domino, 2020)
- "Blue Marbled Elm Trees" (2023)

=== Other works ===
- My Nth Bit of Strange in Umpteen Years (2009/2010) (Performance-only album)

== Other recordings ==
- 2005: He recorded a cover of Jeff Buckley's Grace for the tribute album Dream Brother: The Songs of Tim and Jeff Buckley
- 2006: He recorded an original song about the biblical plague of frogs called Relate the Tale for the Artangel /4AD project Plague Songs; He remixed Badly Drawn Boy's Nothing's Going to Change Your Mind for the single release (highest chart position in the UK #38); He recorded a version of the song Nothing Compares 2 U, originally written by Prince.
- 2007: He recorded an original song, Where and When, with music by King Creosote and lyrics written by Scottish novelist Laura Hird. This was for the album Ballads of the Book, a collection of collaborations between Scottish musicians and novelists & poets.
- 2008: He recorded a version of Malcolm Middleton's Choir which appeared on the b-side of the 7" single version of Blue Plastic Bags. This was something of a reciprocal deal, with Middleton having covered King Creosote's Margerita Red on his 2008 album, Sleight of Heart.
- 2010: He contributed to the Cold Seeds collaborative album along with Frances Donnelly of Animal Magic Tricks, and Neil Pennycook and Pete Harvey from Meursault, which was released on the Edinburgh-based indie label Song, By Toad Records. Anderson, Donnelly and Pennycook all wrote songs for the project, which all four performers then recorded together; each singer often taking the lead vocal role on a song written by another of the artists.
- 2011: He collaborated with Jon Hopkins to create the album Diamond Mine, released 28 March on Domino Recording Company. The songs were written earlier in King Creosote's career and revisited for this project.
- 2014: He featured on the track "Immunity" from the Jon Hopkins EP Asleep Versions, a retake on the title track of Hopkins's 2013 album.
