= Honest Words =

EP by King Creosote & Jon Hopkins
- Released: 19 September 2011
- Recorded: Cafe Music, Analogue Catalogue, Crail
- Genre: Folk, electronic music
- Label: Domino
- Producer: Jon Hopkins

King Creosote & Jon Hopkins chronology
Diamond Mine (2011)	Honest Words (2011)

Honest Words is an EP by Scottish singer-songwriter King Creosote and English electronica musician Jon Hopkins, released on 19 September 2011 on Domino Records. The release is available on 12" vinyl and digital download.

Following on from their Mercury Prize nominated debut, Diamond Mine, the EP features two new recordings alongside a reworking of album track, "Bats in the Attic".

== Background ==
Professional ratings
Review scores
Source	Rating
The Skinny	4/5 stars

Unlike their collaborative debut, the EP is not directly influenced by the East Neuk of Fife, with Domino Records noting, "Lyrically, there's more soul-searching than Fife folklore on the EP follow up to Diamond Mine [...] The music underneath follows these thoughts into more expansive, crystalline realms, far away from the harbours and tea-rooms where they began."

== Track listing ==
Written by Kenny Anderson and Jon Hopkins, except where noted.

1. "Honest Words" (Anderson/Hopkins/Johnston)
2. "Aurora Boring Alias"
3. "Bats in the Attic (Unraveled)"

== Personnel ==
=== Musicians ===
- King Creosote - lead vocals, acoustic guitars, lyrics
- Jon Hopkins - piano, Casiotone, electronics, field recordings, atmospheres, percussion, organ
- Lisa Elle - additional vocals ("Honest Words")
- Sarah Jones - drums ("Honest Words")
- Phil Wilkinson - drums ("Bats in the Attic")

=== Recording personnel ===
- Jon Hopkins - producer, arrangements
- Guy Davie - mastering
- Julie McLarnon - guitar and vocal recording ("Honest Words")
- Cherif Hashizume - drum recording
- King Creosote - vocal recording ("Aurora Boring Alias")

=== Artwork ===
- Max Myers - cover photo
- Matthew Cooper - artwork
