= The Pictish Trail =

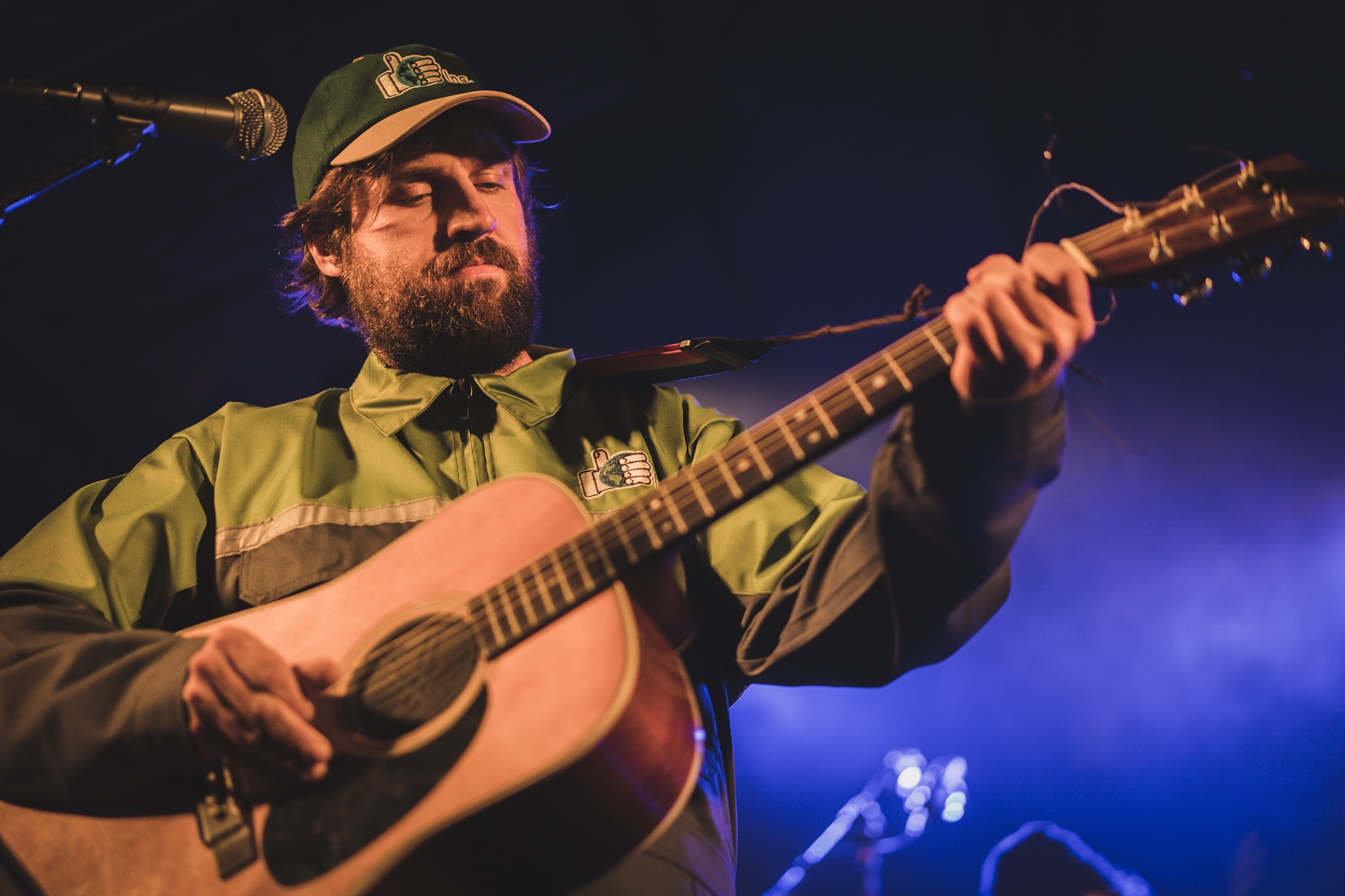
- Lynch performing live at Krankenhaus Festival

Background information
- Born: Johnny Lynch; 28 September 1981 (age 44)
- Origin: Edinburgh, Scotland
- Genres: Folk, electronic, indie folk
- Years active: 2002–present
- Labels: Fence, Moshi Moshi, Lost Map Records, Fire Records (UK)
- Formerly of: Silver Columns

Johnny Lynch (born 28 September 1981) is a Scottish musician who performs under the pseudonym The Pictish Trail. After graduation from the University of St Andrews, Lynch ran Fence Records from 2003 until 2013 and has since been running Lost Map Records. Lynch has attended and played every Green Man Festival since its inception in 2003. He's also played as band member with other musicians, including James Yorkston and Malcolm Middleton. In 2010 he released an album and toured with Adem Ilhan under the name Silver Columns.

== Career ==
=== Early career ===
Johnny Lynch started performing under the moniker The Pictish Trail in 2002, recording his first album on his computer and releasing it on Fence Records in 2003. Lynch ran Fence Records from 2003 until August 2013, working for the label for 10 years in total, before leaving to form a new label, Lost Map Records.

=== Secret Soundz Vol. 1 (2008–2012) ===
Lynch released his proper debut album, Secret Soundz Vol.1, in September 2008, to critical acclaim. In February 2009, The Times named Secret Soundz as an "Essential Recording" of the Fence Collective. In 2010 The List magazine named Lynch as the 12th "Hottest Scot" in its list of creative Scottish people. His 2010 album In Rooms (12" vinyl) consists of 50 songs of 30 seconds each written as part of the "100 Days To Make Me A Better Person" project of 2009. Lynch also supported KT Tunstall throughout her 2010-2011 European tour in support of her 2010 album, Tiger Suit.

=== Secret Soundz Vol. 2 (2012–2016) ===
Secret Soundz Vol. 2 was recorded with Sweet Baboo taking up production duties, on the Isle of Eigg (where Lynch now lives), in 2012. The album was released to critical praise in February 2013. It was re-released as a double CD set, with Vol.1, on Moshi Moshi in 2014.

In July 2014, the first Howlin' Fling Festival took place on Eigg, with Lynch as organiser and performer. The line-up included, among others, Jens Lekman, Beth Orton and Sam Amidon, The Phantom Band and various bands from Lost Map Records. A companion mini-festival took place for the first time in August 2015 at Penicuik Town Hall.

The Pictish Trail appeared on James Yorkston's 2014 album, The Cellardyke Recording and Wassailing Society, and toured live with Yorkston supporting the release.

=== Future Echoes (2016) ===
In September 2016, Pictish Trail (without "The" in its name) released a new album, Future Echoes, produced by Adem. It featured the singles "Far Gone" and "Dead Connection". A full tour followed the released, with the band featuring members of Lost Map signees Tuff Love. Around the same time, Lynch and members of Tuff Love also toured with Malcolm Middleton as his backing band.

Together with his band, Lynch supported Scottish singer-songwriter KT Tunstall once more, this time at her open air gig at the Kelvingrove Bandstand in Glasgow in August 2017.

=== Thumb World (2020 to present) ===
Thumb World released in February 2020, featuring the singles Double Sided, Lead Balloon and Turning Back. The album received positive reviews from critics, with Jamie Bowman of The Skinny describing it as "funny, beautiful and life-affirming".

In April 2020, amid the COVID-19 outbreak, Lynch was featured in a Guardian article about the Lost Map Records residency project on Eigg, in light of the UK-wide lockdown.

== Personal life ==
Lynch lives on Eigg with his family.

== Discography ==
=== Studio albums ===
- Secret Soundz Vol. 1 (2008)
- In Rooms (2010) (mini-album)
- Secret Soundz Vol. 2 (2013)
- Future Echoes (2016)
- Thumb World (2020)
- Island Family (2022)
- Life Slime (2025)

==== CD-R releases ====
- The Pictish Trail (2003)
- Pick @ Pictish (2003)
- Hot Trail (2004)

=== Compilation albums ===
- Norman the Fence, Fence Records (2003)
- Fence Reunited, Fence Records (2003)
- Fine Tuning, Fence Records (2003)
- Fence Reunited, Fence Records (2003)
- Gangplank - Walk the 7, Fence Records (2003)
- Fence @ Pittenweem '04, Fence Records (2004)
- Welcome the Hummingbeans, Fence Records (2005)
- Balloons, Fence Records (2005)
- Don't Fudge with the Fence Made, Fence Records (2007)
- PostMap 00°1 Sampler, Lost Map Records (2013)

=== Singles ===
- "Words Fail Me Now" (2007)
- "Winter Home Disco (Remixes)" (2008)

=== With Silver Columns ===
- Yes, and Dance (2010)
