= Fence Records =

Scottish record label

Fence Records was a Scottish independent record label based in Anstruther and Crail, Fife, Scotland, founded by musician King Creosote, and run by The Pictish Trail until 2013. Fence Records released records by James Yorkston, Rozi Plain, Lone Pigeon, U.N.P.O.C., Kid Canaveral, eagleowl, Randolph's Leap, Deaf Mutes, Withered Hand, Delifinger, Barbarossa, The Shivers and FOUND amongst others. The Fence Collective is the name given to artists on or associated with the label.

== History ==
Fence was founded in 1997 by Kenny Anderson, who performs under the name King Creosote, who, after the record shop he was working in went bust, began to record and sell the music of his friends. The label side of Fence grew steadily in size, in terms of audience and artist roster, boasting a variety of musical styles beyond its initial folk slant and geographical focus. Fence organised a number of festivals including Homegame, Haarfest, Hott Loggz and Eye o' the Dug which took place in Anstruther, Cellardyke and St. Andrews, and Away Game which took place on the Isle of Eigg. Various festivals have also hosted Fence Nights/showcases including Edinburgh Festival Fringe and Glasgow's West End Festival.

The label became a limited company during 2012, but Kenny Anderson increasingly distanced himself from the label early in the partnership, feeling that the label and collective had strayed into territory where he was less comfortable. The limited company ceased operations in August 2013, due to differences between Kenny Anderson and The Pictish Trail who had been handling most of the organisation of releases and events since 2003. The announcement that the limited company would cease operations was followed by a statement from Anderson, saying that he will continue to use the Fence Records name with new projects to be announced in January 2014.
