= Welcome Stranger (disambiguation) =

The Welcome Stranger is the largest alluvial gold nugget ever found.

Welcome Stranger may also refer to:

== Film, television, and radio ==
- Welcome Stranger (1924 film), an American lost silent film directed by James Young
- Welcome Stranger (1947 film), an American film directed by Elliott Nugent
- "Welcome Stranger" (Lost in Space), a 1965 television episode
- "Welcome Stranger", a 1954 episode of Lux Radio Theatre

== Literature ==
- Welcome Stranger, a 2002 Point Horror novel by Anthony Masters
- "Welcome, Stranger!", a 1963 essay by Isaac Asimov included in his 1965 anthology Of Time and Space and Other Things

== Music ==
=== Albums ===
- Welcome Stranger (album), by the Blackeyed Susans, 1992
- Welcome, Stranger!, by the Blue Aeroplanes, 2017
- Welcome Strangers, by Modern Studies, 2018

=== Songs ===
- "Welcome Stranger", by Daniel Boone, 1963
- "Welcome Stranger", by Washington from I Believe You Liar, 2010
- "Welcome Stranger", from the 1960s TV series Lost in Space, included on the soundtrack album Lost in Space 40th Anniversary Edition, 2005
- "Welcome Stranger", written by Blanche Merrill, 1921

== See also ==
- Selections from Welcome Stranger, an album by Bing Crosby from the 1947 film
- Welcome the Stranger, a 2018 American mystery film
