= Enfant Bastard =

English musician and artist

- Born: Cameron Watt; 1980 (age 45–46); Cleethorpes, England
- Genres: Indie rock, alt-folk, lo-fi, chip tune, house
- Occupations: Singer-songwriter, artist
- Instruments: Vocals, guitar, game boy, synthesizer
- Years active: 2006–present
- Label: SL Records
- Website: enfantbastard.bandcamp.com

Enfant Bastard (also known as Les Enfant Bastard) is the performing name for Cameron 'Cammy' Watt, a musician and artist formerly based in Edinburgh, Scotland who has released albums spanning a number of genres including indie, alt-folk, Lo-fi, Chip music and House. He now resides in Gothenburg, Sweden where we works as an artist.

Enfant Bastard was a prominent member of Edinburgh's alternative music scene of the 2000s alongside artists such as Meursault and Withered Hand. His work has been critically acclaimed in the Scottish music press, and he has been described by The Scotsman as 'Edinburgh's most beguiling musical innovator' and as a 'lo-fi genius' by The Skinny. He was also important in introducing Chip Music to Scotland.

== Biography ==
Watt was born in Cleethorpes in the North-East of England in 1980. He moved to Edinburgh in 2001 to study painting at the Edinburgh College of Art. In Edinburgh he became involved in the city's alternative music scene alongside acts such as Meursault, Withered Hand, Eagleowl and Rob St. John, first as a member of the anti-folk band The Love Gestures (which also featured Dan Willson of Withered Hand and Neil Pennycook of Meursault). He subsequently performed as 'Enfant Bastard' and was closely involved in the Bear Scotland collective, alongside the Foundling Wheel, Dead Boy Robotics and Meursault and Withered Hand.

He moved to Gothenburg in 2012, where he now works as an artist. He held his first solo exhibition in Spring 2014 at the Lilla Galeriet. His artwork has appeared on the cover of releases by Wet Paint and Meursault.

== Music ==
Much of Enfant Bastard's work is lo-fi being recorded in accordance with what he has called the 'bedroom recordist manifesto'. This approach led to the NME describing his work as 'snobby art-school jazz pish'. Much of his output was released in small runs of hand-made CD-R's, before later being given wider release by independent Edinburgh label SL Records. His often chaotic live shows have also been highly praised, with The Scotsman naming his EP launch for Master Dude as one of their gigs of 2010.

His early releases were largely guitar based songs described variously as indie, folk, and anti-folk. He later began releasing music in the chip tune genre, recorded mostly using a game boy, and he became influential in introducing the genre to Scotland, paving the way for artists such as Unicorn Kid.

Watt has enjoyed a close musical relationship with Dan Willson of Withered Hand. As well as performing together in the band Love Gestures, Watt helped write the song Oldsmobile Car along with Neil Pennycook of Meursault which appeared on Withered Hand's You're Not Alone EP (a version of the song was also released by Meursault as Red Candle Bulb). Enfant Bastard also released a chip-tune version of Withered Hand's For the Maudlin on his Master Dude album, while Walls by Enfant Bastard was covered by Withered Hand on his Inbetweens EP. In 2014 Watt animated the video to the Withered Hand single 'Black Tambourine'.

== Discography ==
- Bambi (2006)
- I Wish I Was A Dead Fast Car (2007)
- Best of Les Enfant Bastard (2009)
- Hunks Killing Arm (2009)
- Accelerated Donkey Song (Leaf style)
- Master Dude (2010)
- Apple Tits for Destruction (2011)
