= Death of a Ladies' Man =

Death of a Ladies' Man may refer to:

- Death of a Ladies' Man (album), a 1977 album by Leonard Cohen
- Death of a Ladies' Man (novel), a 2009 novel by Alan Bissett
- Death of a Ladies' Man, a 2012 novella by Christiana Spens
- Death of a Ladies' Man (film), a 2020 film written and directed by Matt Bissonnette

== See also ==
- Death of a Lady's Man, a 1978 book of collected writings by Leonard Cohen
