= Avalanche Records Alternative Christmas =

Compilation album by Various artists
- Released: 15 December 2009
- Genre: Alternative rock, Christmas music
- Label: Avalanche Records

Avalanche Records Alternative Christmas is a Christmas album, in CD-R format, made up of contributions from Scottish bands and musicians. Released by Avalanche Records in Edinburgh, it raised money for charities Street Invest and the Royal Hospital for Sick Children, Edinburgh.

== Reception ==
Both The List and The Skinny awarded the album four stars out of five.

== Tracklisting ==
1. "In Excelsis Deo" - There Will Be Fireworks
2. "Christmastime in the Mountains" - The Savings & Loan
3. "December & Whisky" - Rob St John
4. "It’s Christmas So We'll Stop" - Frightened Rabbit
5. "But Once a Year" - Pictish Trail
6. "Sleep the Winter" - Eagleowl
7. "It's a Wonderful Lie" - Withered Hand
8. "Christmas in Kirkcaldy" - Meursault
9. "Holy" - Emily Scott
10. "Atoms" - Money Can't Buy music
11. "Xmas in New York" - Saint Jude's Infirmary
12. "All So Tired" - Broken Records
13. "Shallow Footprints in the Snow" - Ballboy
14. "Little Drum Machine Boy" - X-Lion Tamer
15. "In Scotland It Never Snowed, In Canada It Did" - Zoey Van Goey
- "Christmas in Kirkcaldy" is a cover of "No Christmas in Kentucky" by Phil Ochs
