= Death of a Ladies' Man (novel) =

2009 novel by Alan Bissett

- Author: Alan Bissett
- Cover artist: Chris Hannah
- Language: English
- Genre: Novel
- Publisher: Hachette Scotland
- Publication date: 23 July 2009
- Publication place: Scotland
- Media type: Print (hardcover)
- Pages: 426
- ISBN: 978-0-7553-1942-8

Death of a Ladies' Man is the third novel by Scottish writer Alan Bissett, released on 23 July 2009. Set within the city of Glasgow, the novel follows divorcee teacher Charlie Bain's journey into hedonism and sex addiction. Bissett describes Death of a Ladies' Man as "a cautionary tale for women written by a man who is trying to say: 'Look, this is why we are the way we are. Understand but do not forgive."

The novel shares its title with Leonard Cohen's 1977 album, Death of a Ladies' Man, and often includes quotes from Cohen preceding its chapters.

== Themes ==
Death of a Ladies' Man largely focuses upon hedonism, ageing, lust, compromise and feminism.

Regarding the recurring theme of feminism, Bissett noted, "You never write with a specific 'audience' in mind, but it does seem that women have reacted to the book more enthusiastically than men. I worried, when I was writing it, that women would accuse me of peddling adolescent, sexist fantasies. Actually, all of the flak has come from men. I think they feel a bit accused by it. I know a guy who said it 'traumatised' him! Women, on the other hand, totally get it, and feel it’s a book which is generally on their side. I’m happy at that result." Bissett also noted, "Modern man is fucked up, modern men really are in a terrible state. I realised that to an even greater degree during the course of the book. I actually wonder whether feminism has had any impact on men at all in the last 30 or 40 years."

== Writing and influences ==
According to Bissett, "the whole story of Death of a Ladies’ Man appeared in a blinding flash. But this turned out to be deceptive, as the first draft took about five months, while the redraft took three years!"

Regarding its typography, Bissett noted, "I like the prose to have rhythm, style and energy. Boyracers was supposed to feel like pop music. Adam Spark was supposed to feel like the speech of a hyperactive child. Death of a Ladies’ Man was supposed to feel like being on cocaine. In all three I was going for flash and kinetics. I’ve never really been capable of writing prose that just sits there on the page, functionally telling the story."

=== Charlie Bain ===
Regarding the construction of the novel's protagonist, Charlie Bain, Bissett noted, "I had to really look at the darkness. That was difficult. I stripped away far more layers of him than I initially thought were there (the absent father, the painful early divorce). I couldn't afford to write about this guy as if he was some moustache-twirling cad. I had to find the pain. [...] That's the tragic thing about him, the nobility is there, there are certain feminine values that should have led him in the right direction, but his cock takes over. We say that glibly all the time about men – their brains are in their trousers – that's what he needs to defeat and can't. He's trapped, sex becomes a numbers game to him, it becomes about engorging himself on women."

Bissett has listed Bret Easton Ellis's American Psycho as an influence on his writing, acknowledging the similarities between principal characters, Charlie Bain and Patrick Bateman: "American Psycho was an enormous influence on me. I think it’s a brave, visionary masterpiece that absolutely blew open the doors on what it was possible for fiction to do. And I can see the thematic connections: Charlie Bain and Patrick Bateman, to a certain extent, inhabit similar worlds on either side of the Atlantic."

=== Seduction community ===
Whilst researching the novel, Bissett attended a party alongside Neil Strauss, author of The Game: Penetrating the Secret Society of Pickup Artists (2005), and other members of Glasgow's seduction community. Regarding this event, Bissett noted, "That idea that sincerity becomes impossible, that all you have is a series of masks and you say whatever needs to be said, you use whatever tactic is required in order to get the target relaxed. That was a really depressing thing for me to see. Male sexuality taken to its logical conclusion. If I was in any doubt that the book I was writing was worthwhile, its value was confirmed that night."

== Setting ==
The novel is set within the city of Glasgow, making references to a number of locations including, Ashton Lane, The 13th Note Café, ABC, Byres Road, Nice N' Sleazy's, and many others. Regarding the overall setting, Bissett noted, "Ladies’ Man is a Glasgow book. I did feel I had a big Glaswegian beast seething around in there that wanted to come out in the strange, alien, beautiful, fucked-up way it did in [Death of a Ladies' Man]."

== Pop culture references ==
Death of a Ladies' Man refers to many Scottish indie rock artists, including: Idlewild, Malcolm Middleton, Frightened Rabbit, Zoey Van Goey, The Twilight Sad, Sons and Daughters and Y'all Is Fantasy Island. In 2010, Bissett noted, "I must admit, things are so busy now I’m not going out to gigs much, but I certainly was when I was writing that book. I usually try and catch up with what the following bands of muckers and comrades are doing: Burnt Island, Maple Leaves, Zoey Van Goey and Y’all is Fantasy Island."
