= Matt Brennan (academic) =

Canadian author, musician, and academic

Matt Brennan (born 1979) is an author, musician, and academic whose work focuses on popular music and society. He is Professor of Popular Music at the University of Glasgow.

== Career and publications ==
Brennan's research has garnered significant press coverage, particularly his work on the cost of recorded music and the value of the live music sector.

His first monograph, When Genres Collide, was named as one of music website Pitchfork's "Favourite Music Books of 2017" and earned an Honorable Mention in the Association of American Publishers’ PROSE Awards for best "Music and Performing Arts" book. His second monograph, Kick It: A Social History of the Drum Kit, was named as one of the 'Best Music Books of 2020' by the Financial Times.

Brennan has authored, co-authored, and co-edited several books listed below:

- 2021: (co-edited with Joseph Michael Pignato and Daniel Akira Stadnicki) The Cambridge Companion to the Drum Kit, Cambridge University Press.
- 2021: (co-authored with Simon Frith, Martin Cloonan, and Emma Webster) The History of Live Music in Britain 1985-2015: From Live Aid to Live Nation, Routledge.
- 2020: Kick It: A Social History of the Drum Kit, Oxford University Press.
- 2019: (co-authored with Simon Frith, Martin Cloonan, and Emma Webster) The History of Live Music in Britain 1968-1984: From Hyde Park to the Haçienda, Routledge.
- 2017: When Genres Collide: Down Beat, Rolling Stone, and the Struggle Between Jazz and Rock, Bloomsbury.
- 2017: (co-edited with Gareth Dylan Smith, Zack Moir, Shara Rambarran, and Philip Kirkman) The Routledge Research Companion to Popular Music Education, Routledge.
- 2013: (co-authored with Simon Frith, Martin Cloonan, and Emma Webster) The History of Live Music in Britain 1950-1967: From Dance Hall to the 100 Club, Routledge.

== Music ==
Brennan is currently a member of Glasgow based band Beautiful Cosmos as well as recording and performing music under the name Citizen Bravo. His first album as Citizen Bravo, Build A Thing Of Beauty, was released by Chemikal Underground in 2019. His sophomore album, a large scale collaborative work Return To Y'Hup: The World Of Ivor Cutler, was released in 2020 and received 4-star reviews in MOJO, Uncut, and The Observer. His first album with Beautiful Cosmos was released by Doughnut Music Lab on 25th January 2025.

Prior to his current projects, Brennan was a founding member of the indie pop group Zoey Van Goey (2006-2012), which released two well received albums - The Cage Was Unlocked All Along in 2009 and Propeller Versus Wings in 2011 - on the Scottish record label Chemikal Underground. He also performed onscreen and on the soundtrack for the film God Help The Girl, which won the World Cinema Dramatic Special Jury Award for Best Ensemble at the 2014 Sundance Film Festival.

== Discography ==
=== as Citizen Bravo ===
==== Albums ====
- Build A Thing Of Beauty (Chemikal Underground Records, 2019)
1. "Humans Of Earth"
2. "The Answer Is Yes"
3. "Build A Thing Of Beauty"
4. "Lesson Number One"
5. "Invincible Kids On Prom Night"
6. "Nineteenth Century"
7. "The Mystery Of History"
8. "I Will Love You When You're Dead
9. "Limbs And Bones"
10. "Stuck Inside Of Mobile Phone"
11. "Have A Nice Time"
- Return To Y'Hup - The World Of Ivor Cutler (Chemikal Underground Records, 2020)
1. "Heres A Health For Simon"
2. "Latitude And Longitude (with Phyllis King)"
3. "Size Nine And A Half (with Emma Pollock)"
4. "Mary's A Cow (with Malcolm Benzie)"
5. "Instance The Yam (with Alex Kapranos)"
6. "Pickle Your Knees (with Karine Polwart)"
7. "Gravity Begins At Home (with Rick Redbeard)"
8. "A Cowpuncher And A Bird (with Zoe Graham)"
9. "Boo Boo Bird (with Heather Leigh)"
10. "Vitamin P (with Duglas T. Stewart)"
11. "Green Rain (with Sarah Hayes)"
12. "A Tooth Song (with Adam Stafford)"
13. "Si Chi (with Stuart Murdoch)"
14. "Women Of The World (with Tracyanne Campbell)"
15. "A Real Man (with James Yorkston)"
16. "A Yellow Fly (with Kris Drever)"
17. "Shoplifters (with Future Pilot AKA vs. Stranded Astronaut)"
18. "The Path (with Stuart Braithwaite)"
19. "Muscular Tree (with Megan Airlie & Limelight Ensemble)"
20. "Who Tore Your Trousers James? (with Rachel Sermanni & Chris Thomson)"
21. "I Got No Common Sense"
22. "When I Stand On An Open Cart (with Kapil Seshasayee)"
23. "I Believe In Bugs (with Jo Mango)"
24. "Good Morning! How Are You? Shut Up! (with Pictish Trail)"
25. "Out Of Decency (with Robert Wyatt)"
26. "Beautiful Cosmos (with Anna Miles)"

=== with Beautiful Cosmos ===
==== Albums ====
- Dance of the Atoms (Doughnut Music Lab, 2025)
1. "Seneca Falls"
2. "Midlife"
3. "Dance of the Atoms"
4. "Gustav"
5. "Birds"
6. "The Life Before"
7. "Fans in the Shadows"
8. "Gabrielle"
9. "Pretender"
10. "Rainy Wednesdays"
11. "Red Flag Factory"

=== Singles & EPs ===
- "Foxtrot Vandals" (w/ b-side "Song To The Embers" remix by Miaoux Miaoux - Say Dirty Records, 2007)
- "Sweethearts In Disguise" (w/ b-side "Lick A 99" remix by Funkspiel - Lucky Number Nine Records, 2008)

=== Albums ===
- The Cage Was Unlocked All Along (Chemikal Underground Records, 2009)
1. "The Best Treasure Stays Buried"
2. "We Don't Have That Kind Of Bread"
3. "Sweethearts In Disguise"
4. "We All Hid In Basements"
5. "Two White Ghosts"
6. "Foxtrot Vandals"
7. "My Persecution Complex"
8. "Nae Wonder"
9. "Cotton Covering"
10. "City Is Exploding"
- Propeller Versus Wings (Chemikal Underground Records, 2011)
1. "Mountain On Fire"
2. "The Cake And Eating It"
3. "Sackville Sun"
4. "My Aviator"
5. "Escape Maps"
6. "You Told The Drunks I Knew Karate"
7. "Little Islands"
8. "Extremities"
9. "Robot Tyrannosaur"
10. "Another Day Another Disaster"
11. "Where It Lands"

=== Contributions ===
- "Xmas in New York" Avalanche Records Alternative Christmas 2009

=== Other recordings ===
- "Song To The Embers"
- "Tell Me Lies"
- "Jump Your Bones"
