= Something for the Weakened =

Studio album by Meursault
- Released: 16 July 2012
- Recorded: Pumpkinfield Studios
- Genre: Indie rock
- Label: Song, by Toad Records

Meursault chronology
All Creatures Will Make Merry (2010)	Something for the Weakened (2012)	The Organ Grinder's Monkey (2014)

Professional ratings
Aggregate scores
Source	Rating
AnyDecentMusic?	7.5/10
Review scores
Source	Rating
AllMusic	4/5 stars
Clash	8/10
DIY	4.5/5 stars
Drowned in Sound	8/10
God is in the TV	4/5 stars
The Line of Best Fit	8.5/10
Mojo	3/5 stars
The Independent	3/5 stars
The Skinny	4/5 stars
Uncut	7/10

Something for the Weakened is the third studio album by Scottish indie rock band Meursault, released on 16 July 2012 on Song, by Toad Records. Regarding the album, songwriter Neil Pennycook noted, "This album makes more sense to me, and I think I’m more relaxed this time. I can hear it as a body of work, and it resonates more with me than the other records."

Unlike the band's previous two studio albums, Something for the Weakened does not feature any electronica elements, with Pennycook noting that his MacBook broke prior to recording, and that "I think we all wanted to move towards something which had a more human element to it."

== Background and recording ==
Recorded by band member Pete Harvey, Something for the Weakened is the first Meursault album to feature contributions from Lorcan Doherty, Sam Mallalieu, Kate Miguda and Rob St. John. Neil Pennycook notes, "With the last two records I was into that idea of just locking myself in a room for a few weeks and emerging with an album, so it was nice to have everyone getting together this time, bouncing things off each other." Pennycook also noted that the band had more input than on previous recordings; "When the songs are being recorded/arranged the rest of the guys have a lot more input now due to the nature of the sessions. Whereas before I treated recording as quite a solitary thing, I play better with others these days."

== Writing and composition ==
Upon the album's release, Neil Pennycook stated, "I'd written a bunch of songs, a few we’d been playing live for a little while in some form or other, but most were worked up from pretty sparse guitar, piano and vocal demos."

Neil Pennycook noted that "[the song] "Flittin’ gave me an idea of what I wanted the album to be about. While the other two are pretty heavily themed, I just wanted this album to reflect what was happening over the course of a year. I don't think the lyrics are quite as metaphorical as they've been in the past, they're a bit more direct and that's what I was after. That carried through the instruments as well."

The lyric, "So long, it's been good to know you," featured in "Flittin'", is by Woody Guthrie.

== Track listing ==
All songs written by Neil Pennycook.

No.	Title	Length
1.	"Thumb"	3:16
2.	"Flittin'"	4:26
3.	"Lament for a Teenage Millionaire"	4:03
4.	"Settling"	5:35
5.	"Hole"	5:26
6.	"Lightning Bolt"	1:15
7.	"Dull Spark"	5:03
8.	"Dearly Distracted"	7:34
9.	"Mamie"	4:06
10.	"Untitled"	2:33

== Personnel ==
=== Meursault ===
- Neil Pennycook
- Calum MacLeod
- Lorcan Doherty
- Sam Mallalieu
- Fraser Calder
- Phillip Quirie
- Pete Harvey
- Kate Miguda
- Rob St. John

=== Arrangements ===
- Pete Harvey - string arrangements

=== Recording personnel ===
- Pete Harvey - recording
- Reuben Taylor - mastering

=== Artwork ===
- Fiona Buckle - image on disc
