= Woodpigeon (band) =

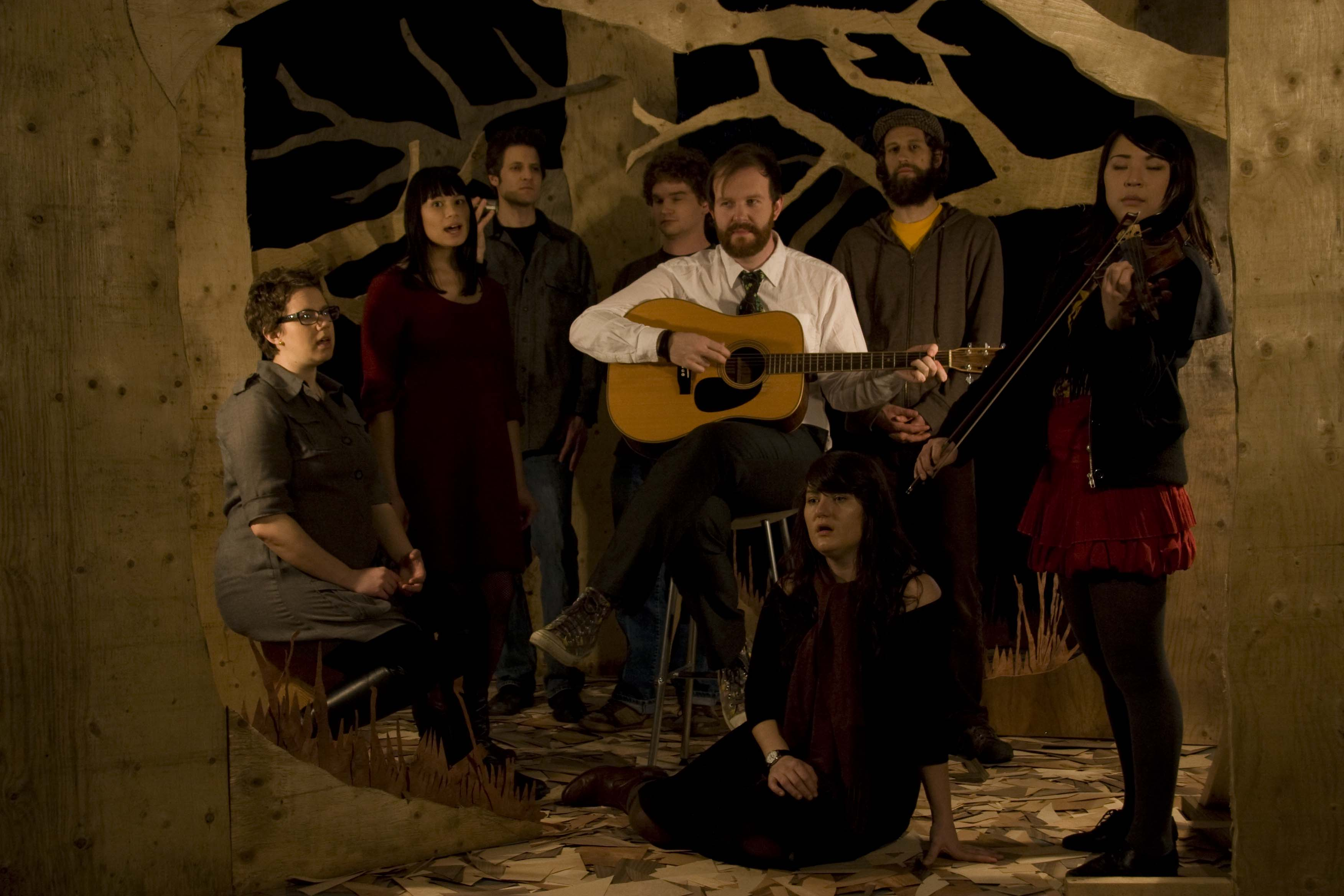
- Woodpigeon circa 2009

Background information
- Origin: Calgary, Alberta, Canada
- Genres: indie pop, folk rock, anti-folk, synthcore, goth
- Years active: 2006–present
- Labels: Boompa (N. America), End of the Road (UK / EU), Fierce Panda (UK / EU), Lirico (JPN), Where It's At is Where You Are (UK / EU), Oscar St. Records (Canada), Song, By Toad Records (UK), Lost Map (UK).
- Members: unknown
- Website: www.woodpigeon-songbook.com / woodpigeon.bandcamp.com

Woodpigeon are a Canadian indie pop collective founded in Calgary and presently based in Montréal. It is led by and performs the songs of Mark Andrew Hamilton. Woodpigeon have released six studio albums, and a number of EPs, and Hamilton has worked with over 75 collaborators both on record and in live performance. Live, Woodpigeon is often a solo project incorporating loops and layered vocals.

When asked about the band's name, Hamilton explains: "I've always been in love with the word Woodpigeon for as long as I can remember. When you write it in cursive, it looks like a rollercoaster."

The band's sound has been compared to Sufjan Stevens, Grizzly Bear, Talk Talk, Camera Obscura, Simon & Garfunkel, and Belle & Sebastian, amongst others. Band leader Mark Hamilton's main lyrical influence is The Kinks.

== Career ==
Woodpigeon's origins are found with primary school songwriter Mark Andrew Hamilton writing songs in Edinburgh, Scotland. At this time, the band was named Woodpigeon Divided By Antelope Equals Squirrel and consisted of Hamilton alongside Steve Kaye and Malcolm Benzie (who went on to form Edinburgh slowcore band eagleowl and performs with Withered Hand). Hamilton states that he "was far too scared to ever sing, so all we ever played was a couple of stupid instrumentals and our only "performance" was in the streets of Edinburgh." Eventually, Hamilton returned to Canada, and started afresh, with the shortened band name, Woodpigeon. Other band members fell in place, with Hamilton noting that: "the way it came together was simplistic: friends started hearing my songs and offering their services."

The band's first full-length album, entitled Songbook, was released in late 2006. Following its release, the band opened for Broken Social Scene, Iron and Wine, Grizzly Bear, and Calexico. In 2007, Hamilton co-founded the Sled Island Music and Arts Festival in Calgary, serving as the festival's first artist curator. With their popularity growing, Woodpigeon toured the UK, Ireland, and Germany in 2008. That October, they performed a pair of "Homecoming" shows in Calgary and Edmonton as an opener for Iron and Wine.

The band self-released an album, Treasury Library Canada, in early August 2008, selling nearly all 1,000 hand-folded copies within a fortnight. The band also re-released their debut album Songbook in the UK on September 29, 2008. Treasury Library Canada was officially re-released in February 2009 as a double album with the ukulele-based Houndstooth Europa collection as Treasury Library Canada c/w Houndstooth Europa, and was long-listed for the 2009 Polaris Prize. Woodpigeon played with acts as varied as The Constantines, Plants & Animals, Mount Eerie, and Grizzly Bear, and Hamilton served as the curator of the first annual Sled Island Festival in Calgary, Alberta, Canada.

The band's third album, Die Stadt Muzikanten, was released on January 12, 2010, with Hamilton stating that it is "simultaneously a lot bigger, and a lot smaller. There's definitely some big surprises on it". A limited Record Store Day release of the album was accompanied with a bonus LP titled BALLADEER/to all the guys i've loved before, featuring songs recorded with producers Steve Albini, Howard Bilerman, and S. Husky Höskulds, and a duet with Beth Jeans Houghton. The record was re-released as a stand-alone album on limited edition vinyl. Woodpigeon has since toured extensively as a headliner, and as opener for Andrew Bird, Horse Feathers, José González, and Junip, and also appeared at the 2011 Meltdown Festival curated by Ray Davies on the Bandstand Busking stage. The same year they played as part of the Canadian Blast showcase for Canadian bands at London's prestigious Barbican, garnering a positive review.

In an interview with Xtra! in early 2010, Hamilton spoke in part about how his identity as a gay man influences his songwriting.

In 2011, Hamilton participated in the National Parks Project, collaborating with musicians Laura Barrett and Cadence Weapon and filmmaker Peter Lynch, to produce and score a short film about Alberta's Waterton Lakes National Park. The Fra Le Nuvole EP was released later in 2011, collecting together two EP-length singles released from Die Stadt Muzikanten. Woodpigeon made their first national tour of Canada in 2011, alongside The Phonemes and The Mountains & the Trees. Transportation for the tour was completed by Via Rail, including performances for the moving trains.

The For Paolo EP followed in January 2012, marking Hamilton's move to Vienna, Austria, followed that September by Diamonds, an album-length collection of outtakes available only online and at live shows, featuring a duet cover of Paul McCartney's Michael Jackson duet "Say Say Say" with Louise Hull. Following a year of touring alongside Junip, Andrew Bird and Patrick Wolf, Woodpigeon appeared at the 2012 Iceland Airwaves Festival in Reykjavik.

Woodpigeon signed to London-based Fierce Panda Records for the 2013 release of Thumbtacks + Glue. The album was accompanied by two adjacent single releases: Edinburgh featuring B-side Little Magnet and a bonus 10-song download LP and Red Rover, Red Rover featuring B-side Sofia + Sam. The Edinburgh video features appearances by noted Edinburgh musicians eagleowl, Rob St. John, and Withered Hand.

Hamilton began 2013 with a self-curated Reykjavik-Calgary Musicians Exchange Project as part of Calgary's One Yellow Rabbit's High Performance Rodeo. The assembled group of six musicians, featuring Reykjavik's Benedikt H. Hermannsson (Benni Hemm Hemm) and Svavar Pétur Eysteinsson Häsler (Prins Póló) alongside Calgarians Clinton St. John, Samantha Savage Smith and Laura Leif, wrote an album's worth of music in Iceland which was then presented at the 2013 Rodeo at Calgary's Festival Hall. The album was subsequently recorded at The Banff Centre by producer Graham Lessard, and released in late 2014 as EMBASSYLIGHTS. The band performed at the 2014 Iceland Airwaves Festival in Reykjavik to commemorate the release. The following year, an expanded lineup of EMBASSYLIGHTS including poet Ragnar Helgi Olafsson undertook a tour of Western Canada, including performances at the Islendingadagurinn Festival in Gimli, Manitoba.

In 2015, Woodpigeon released a split 7-inch with Norman Blake of Teenage Fanclub, and a split 10-inch with Rob St. John featuring artwork by painter Jake Bee. A lengthy solo tour alongside Withered Hand throughout Europe followed, as well as soundtrack work for the Italian feature film Short Skin, which premiered at the Venice Film Festival. A limited edition 7-inch of the soundtrack was also released, featuring four songs from the sessions.

Woodpigeon's sixth album, T R O U B L E, was released on April 1, 2016. Largely written in Buenos Aires, Argentina and recorded on Vancouver Island and in Toronto, the record was produced by Sandro Perri and features appearances by David Thomas Broughton and Mary Margaret O'Hara. The album holds a 71% rating on Metacritic. Mojo reviewed the record, calling it a "masterpiece" and noted, "This is the work of an artist who, seemingly despite himself, has turned into a major contender." In November 2017, the Devastating EP was released, featuring B-sides and remixes from the T R O U B L E sessions.

In webposts the recording of a new Woodpigeon album was announced as well as the project Frontperson together with Kathryn Calder from the band The New Pornographers. Frontperson's first album Frontrunner was released in 2018, garnering strong reviews from Bust, Stereogum, and The Guardian, who named the pair, "two of Canada's finest" indie songwriters. Parade, the duo's second album as Frontperson, was released in April 2022.

The band is currently inactive with no future plans.

== Discography ==
=== Studio albums ===
- Songbook (2006)
- Treasury Library Canada (2008) (later re-released combined with Houndstooth Europa)
- Die Stadt Muzikanten (2010)
- BALLADEER/to all the guys i've loved before (2010) (Limited Edition)
- Diamonds (2012) (Limited Edition available only online and at shows)
- Thumbtacks + Glue (2013)
- T R O U B L E (2016)

=== EPs ===
- Sketchbook (2005)
- Pigeonbooth: Volume the First w/ Aaron Booth (2005)
- Snowshovel (2005)
- Knighty Knight w/ Aaron Booth & Jane Vain (2006)
- ...A Given (2006)
- Houndstooth (2007)
- Chorus of Wolves (2008)
- La Commission Scolaire (2009)
- Fra Le Nuvole (2011)
- For Paolo (2012)
- Edinburgh (2013)
- Red Rover, Red Rover (2013)
- Lost Cat Vol. 03 w/ Eagleowl (2014)
- Young Sun / Trouble Comes w/ Rob St. John (2015)
- Faithful (2016)
- Whole Body Shakes (2016)
- Short Skin (2017)
- Devastating (2017)
- XOXMAS // Winter Song (2020)
- Emotorik // Yakub (2021)

=== Other ===
- Pixie Children Crying (2008) (Digital-only Remix Collection)
- Live in Turin (2011) (Live album recorded at Circolo Esperia in Torino, Italy)
- Thumbtacks + Glue | The Queen City Versions (2013) (Digital-only Demo Collection)
- Houses Built in Rows (2015) (Digital-only Best-of Collection)
- Split 12-inch w/ LT Leif and Dana Gavanski (2019) Song, by Toad Records

=== 7-inch singles ===
- "Death by Ninja (a Love Song)" (2006)
- "That Was Good But You Can Do Better" (2008)
- "Edinburgh" (2013)
- "Brutish British Birds / Tokyo Hotel Room" (with Norman Blake of Teenage Fanclub) (2015)
- "Short Skin" Soundtrack (2016)
