= Cold Seeds =

Studio album by Cold Seeds
- Released: March 2010 (Special Limited Edition); June, 2010 (General Release)
- Recorded: October 2009, Stockbridge, Edinburgh
- Genres: Indie Folk, Lo-Fi,
- Label: Song, by Toad Records

Professional ratings
Review scores
Source	Rating
Artrocker	4/5 stars
Drowned in Sound	8/10 stars
The List	4/5 stars
The Skinny	3/5 stars

Cold Seeds is a musical collaboration between Kenny Anderson (King Creosote), Frances Donnelly (Animal Magic Tricks), and Neil Pennycook and Peter Harvey of Meursault.

The term Cold Seeds refers to the project as a whole, encompassing the name of the group and the title of the album that emerged from the collaboration. The name is derived from Frances Donnelly's lyrics to Leave Me To Lie Alone in the Ground.

The album was recorded in the Autumn of 2009 at the Song, by Toad Records recording facility in Stockbridge, Edinburgh. Anderson, Donnelly and Pennycook all wrote songs for the project, which the group then recorded together — each singer often taking the lead vocal role on a song written by one of the other artists — while Harvey composed, arranged and performed the distinctive cello parts.

A limited edition, hand-printed heavyweight-vinyl version of the album was released in March 2010 at Fence Records' annual "Home Game" festival in Anstruther, Fife. A general release was then announced for June 2010.

== Track listing ==
No.	Title	Writer(s)	Length
1.	"Leave Me To Lie Alone in the Ground"	Donnelly	3:40
2.	"King"	Donnelly	3:46
3.	"Bubble"	Anderson	4:00
4.	"Sleet"	Pennycook	5:32
5.	"Crank Resolutions"	Pennycook	4:06
6.	"By 11 O’Clock She’d Left"	Anderson	3:12
7.	"The Perfume of Mexican Birds"	Donnelly	4:36
8.	"Soil"	Donnelly	5:30
9.	"Please Don’t Send Me Home"	Pennycook	5:10

== Personnel ==
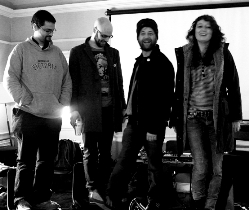
Cold Seeds: (l-r) Peter Harvey, Neil Pennycook, Kenny Anderson, Frances Donnelly

=== Cold Seeds ===
- Kenny Anderson
- Frances Donnelly
- Peter Harvey
- Neil Pennycook

=== Artwork ===
- Frances Donnelly
