= Modern Studies (band) =

Music band

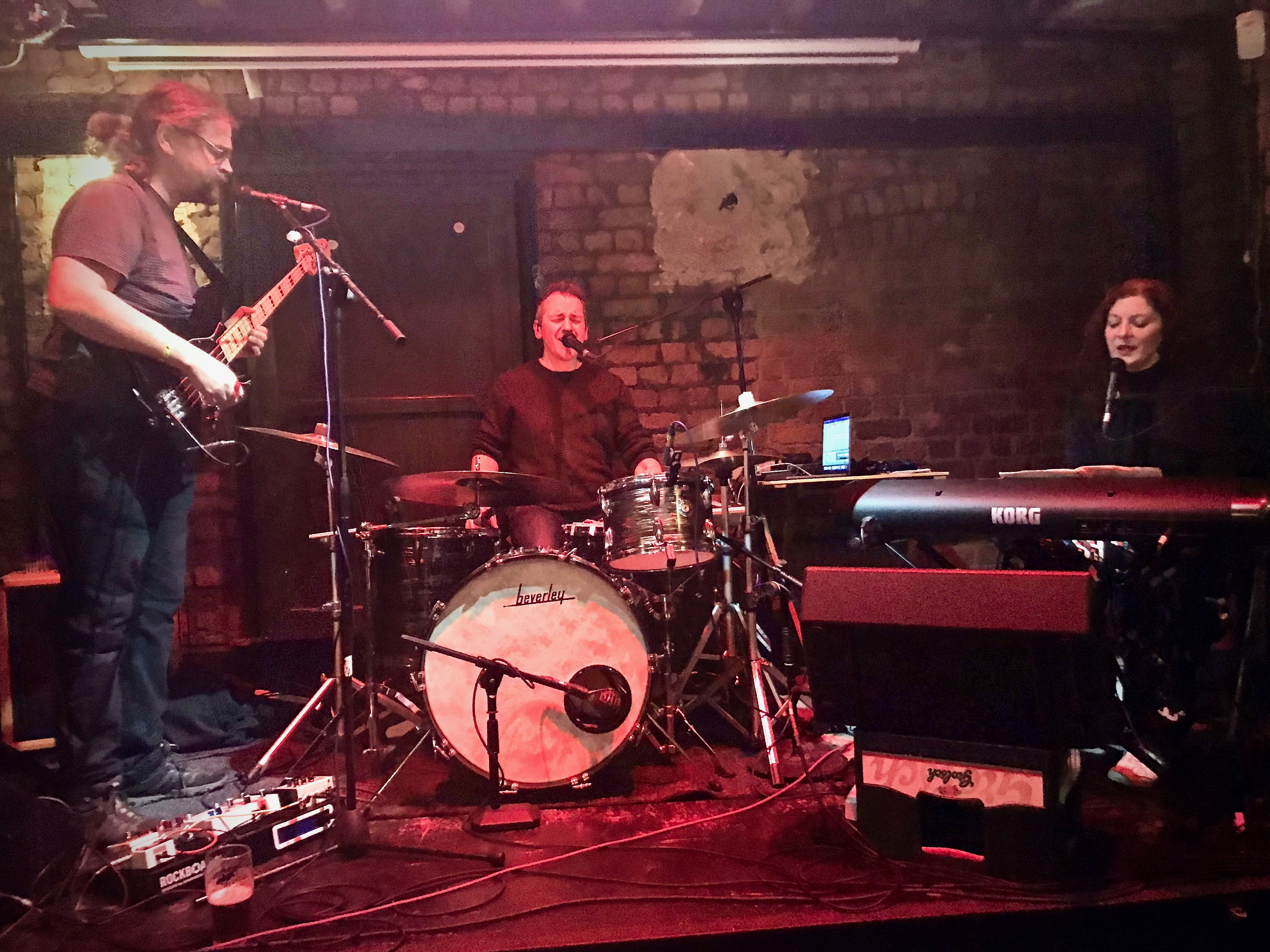
- Modern Studies performing at the Eagle Inn in Salford, 2022

Background information
- Origin: Perthshire, Scotland
- Genres: Chamber pop; indie folk; indie pop; indie rock
- Years active: 2015–present
- Labels: Fire; Song, by Toad
- Members: Emily Scott; Rob St. John; Pete Harvey; Joe Smillie
- Website: modernstudiestheband.com

Modern Studies is a Scottish chamber pop band based between Scotland and Lancashire. The group has released four studio albums and a remix collaboration, all on Fire Records.

== History ==
The band was founded in 2015 by Emily Scott, who had been writing songs on an antique harmonium in her home in Glasgow. She arranged to give the instrument to a friend, Pete Harvey, who owned a recording studio called Pumpkinfield in Perthshire, and together they began working on Scott's material with drummer Joe Smillie and multi-instrumentalist Rob St. John. Their debut studio album, Swell to Great, was issued by Song, by Toad Records in 2016 and then reissued worldwide by Fire Records in October 2017. The album was named in Mojo magazine's Top 20 albums of the year list, and on the long-list for the Scottish Album of the Year Award.

A follow-up, Welcome Strangers, was released in 2018, and this album was remixed in collaboration with Tommy Perman and issued as Emergent Slow Arcs in 2019. In May 2020, Modern Studies released their third studio album, The Weight of the Sun. The band have toured extensively across the UK, playing Glastonbury Festival and Celtic Connections festivals amongst others, and staged their own orchestral audio-visual show, ‘SOUNDING’ at the 2017 Edinburgh Festival Fringe.

== Band members ==
- Emily Scott – vocals, organ, piano, double bass
- Rob St. John – vocals, guitar, synthesizer, harmonium, tape loops
- Pete Harvey – cello, bass guitar, piano
- Joe Smillie – drums, mellotron, vocals

== Discography ==
- Swell to Great (Fire, 2016)
- Welcome Strangers (Fire, 2018)
- Emergent Slow Arcs with Tommy Perman (Fire, 2019)
- The Weight of the Sun (Fire, 2020)
- We Are There (Fire, 2022)
