= I Am Nothing =

I Am Nothing may refer to:

- "I Am Nothing", a song by Dope from the 1999 album Felons and Revolutionaries
- "I Am Nothing", a song by Withered Hand from Good News
- I Am Nothing, a 2012 album by Convictions
