= All Creatures Will Make Merry =

Studio album by Meursault
- Released: April 2010 (hand-printed edition); 24 May 2010 (general release)
- Recorded: December 2009–January 2010, Stockbridge, Edinburgh
- Genre: Folktronica, indie folk
- Label: Song, by Toad Records

Meursault chronology
Pissing On Bonfires / Kissing With Tongues (2008)	All Creatures Will Make Merry (2010)	Something for the Weakened (2012)

Professional ratings
Review scores
Source	Rating
BBC	favourable
Bearded	favourable
Clash	7/10 stars
Drowned In Sound	7/10 stars
The Line Of Best Fit	favourable
The List	4/5 stars
Mojo	4/5 stars
Pitchfork Media	(7.9/10)
The Skinny	3/5 stars

All Creatures Will Make Merry is the second studio album by Scottish indie folk band Meursault, released on 24 May 2010. A limited edition, hand-printed version of the album was released in April 2010. Songwriter, vocalist and guitarist Neil Pennycook states that "the main theme of the record is one of contentment – what people are willing to do to obtain it, hold on to it, and what we stand to lose or gain if we try."

== Background and recording ==
Following the critical acclaim of the band's debut album, Pissing On Bonfires / Kissing With Tongues, a newly extended version of Meursault recorded All Creatures Will Make Merry in the winter of 2009, in Stockbridge, Edinburgh. Songwriter, vocalist and guitarist Neil Pennycook states that "playing with a full live band helped shape this record considerably," and praised the contributions of both Phillip Quirie and Pete Harvey: "[they] opened up a huge range of possibilities with these songs."

Pennycook states that his production was influenced by The Microphones and Mount Eerie.

The names of the album and its titular third track come from the 1980 film adaptation of Flash Gordon; as the tyrannical Ming the Merciless prepares to forcefully wed Earthling woman Dale, a ship flies over his ceremony bearing the banner, "All creatures will make merry," and shortly afterward is followed by another that reads, "Under pain of death." Pennycook chose the phrase because he felt it fit with the album's themes of "the pursuit of happiness and how it's the one thing that ultimately everyone has in common."

== Content ==
According to songwriter Neil Pennycook, "the themes and motivation behind All Creatures Will Make Merry come from completely different place than those on Pissing on Bonfires/Kissing With Tongues. I feel a certain duty to myself in terms of my own expectations for this album, other than that I couldn't imagine making an album to someone else's supposed criteria, that is my idea of hell."

== Track listing ==
All songs written by Neil Pennycook, performed by Meursault.

No.	Title	Length
1.	"Payday"	1:00
2.	"Crank Resolutions"	4:44
3.	"All Creatures Will Make Merry… Under Pain of Death"	3:50
4.	"Weather"	4:22
5.	"One Day This'll All Be Fields"	3:29
6.	"What You Don't Have"	5:16
7.	"Another"	4:42
8.	"New Ruin"	4:30
9.	"Sleet"	4:50
10.	"Song for Martin Kippenberger"	6:51
11.	"A Fair Exchange"	1:52

== Personnel ==
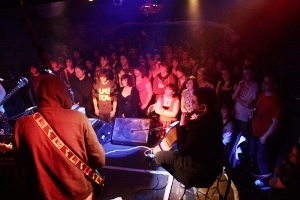
Meursault perform to a capacity audience at Cabaret Voltaire in Edinburgh for the launch of All Creatures Will Make Merry

=== Meursault ===
- Chris Bryant
- Fraser Calder
- Peter Harvey
- Calum MacLeod
- Neil Pennycook
- Philip Quirie
- Gavin Tarling

=== Production and design ===
- Neil Pennycook - recording
- Brothers Grimm - artwork
