= Pissing on Bonfires / Kissing with Tongues =

Pissing On Bonfires / Kissing With Tongues

Studio album by Meursault
- Released: 2008
- Recorded: Edinburgh
- Genre: Folktronica
- Label: Song, by Toad Records

Meursault chronology
| Pissing On Bonfires / Kissing With Tongues (2008) | All Creatures Will Make Merry (2010) |

Professional ratings
Review scores
| Source | Rating |
|---|---|
| Is this music? | (favourable) |
| The Skinny | 5/5 stars |
| The Scotsman | (favourable) |

Pissing On Bonfires / Kissing With Tongues is the debut studio album by Scottish indie folk band Meursault, released in 2008 to a generally positive reception from the music press and online community critics. The band initially self-released the album in 2008, before a second run was released on the Edinburgh-based independent label, Song, by Toad Records, in 2009.

== Track listing ==
| No. | Title | Length |
|---|---|---|
| 1. | "Salt (Part One)" | 6:23 |
| 2. | "Statues Of Strangers" | 2:11 |
| 3. | "The Furnace" | 3:46 |
| 4. | "Pissing On Bonfires / Kissing With Tongues" | 3:52 |
| 5. | "Salt (Part Two)" | 3:18 |
| 6. | "The Dirt And The Roots" | 3:46 |
| 7. | "A Few Kind Words" | 3:09 |
| 8. | "A Small Stretch Of Land" | 4:58 |
| 9. | "Ampersand After Ampersand" | 1:07 |
| 10. | "Lament For A Teenage Millionaire" | 3:35 |
| 11. | "Oh, Neighbourhood!" | 3:15 |

== Personnel ==
=== Meursault ===
- Chris Bryant
- Fraser Calder
- Calum MacLeod
- Neil Pennycook

== Cultural references ==
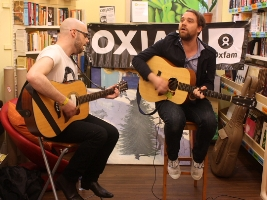
Neil Pennycook (l) of Meursault and Scott Hutchison (r) of Frightened Rabbit perform at Oxjam, Edinburgh 2009

- Scott Hutchison of Frightened Rabbit has often performed A Small Stretch Of Land; taken from Pissing On Bonfires / Kissing With Tongues and written by Neil Pennycook, during his live appearances. He also said that inspired Poke and that it was a "perfect" song to him that he'd wish he'd written.
- The BBC selected The Furnace for heavy daytime rotation on Radio 1 as part of their promotion of the corporation's coverage of Glastonbury 2010.
- Scottish arts and culture magazine The Skinny placed Pissing On Bonfires / Kissing With Tongues sixteenth in its list of the best Scottish albums of the 2000-2010 decade.
