= Eagleowl =

Scottish indie folk band

eagleowl
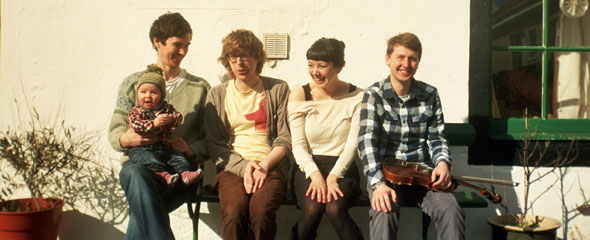
- eagleowl at Homegame festival 2010 (Anstruther, Fife)

Background information
- Origin: Edinburgh, Scotland
- Genres: Indie folk, Slowcore
- Years active: 2005–present
- Labels: Fife Kills; Kilter; Fence Records; Lost Map Records
- Members: Bartholomew Owl - guitar, vocals, glockenspiel Clarissa Cheong - double bass, vocals Malcolm Benzie - violin, guitar, vocals Rob St John - harmonium, organ, vocals Owen Williams - drums Hannah Shepherd - cello, vocals
- Website: www.eagleowlattack.co.uk

eagleowl are a Scottish lo-fi, indie folk band from Edinburgh, Scotland.

== History ==
eagleowl are Bartholomew Owl (guitar, vocals, glockenspiel), Clarissa Cheong (double bass, vocals), Malcolm Benzie (violin, guitar, vocals), Rob St John (harmonium, organ, vocals), Owen Williams (drums) and Hannah Shepherd (cello).

The Scotsman, in a 2009 interview, described the band as "the soundtrack to the saddest, most beautiful art-house film you've never seen." The band's sound has been compared to Low, Galaxie 500, Dirty Three, John Cale, Bonnie 'Prince' Billy and The Low Anthem. In an interview with The List, Bart Owl cited Bert Jansch, Fairport Convention, Alasdair Roberts, Smog and Edinburgh contemporaries Broken Records and Withered Hand as influences on the band.

== EPs 2008–2010 ==
Between 2008 and 2010 eagleowl released two EPs and a single to widespread national critical acclaim: For the Thoughts You Never Had EP (2008: Fife Kills Records); 7 inch single Sleep The Winter (2009: Kilter); and Into the Fold EP (2010: Kilter). Sleep The Winter was featured on the soundtrack to BBC drama Lip Service on 9 November 2010 and Into the Fold EP has received radio play from XFM, BBC Radio Scotland's Vic Galloway and BBC 6 Music's Gideon Coe.

In 2009 eagleowl were commissioned by the Edinburgh International Film Festival to soundtrack a series of films from the Scottish Screen National Archive alongside Meursault and FOUND. In February 2010, eagleowl recorded a live studio session for Vic Galloway's BBC Radio Scotland show.

Eagleowl have played a number of festivals, including Green Man, End of the Road, Fence Records Homegame, and Haarfest and the Edinburgh Popfest (run by Gordon McIntyre of Ballboy). At the Homegame festival in March 2010, eagleowl recorded a camper van session for BBC Scotland.

== This Silent Year (2013) ==
On 13 May 2013 eagleowl released their debut album 'This Silent Year' through Fence Records and toured across the UK with The Pictish Trail, collaborating as his backup band. 'This Silent Year' received a number of positive reviews, with The Skinny calling it "enduring and elegant" and The 405 describing it as a "great record".

Eagleowl are now signed to Pictish Trail's label Lost Map Records, based in Eigg, Scotland.

== Collaborations ==
Malcolm Benzie played in a short-lived band called Woodpigeon Divided By Antelope Equals Squirrel in Edinburgh with Mark Hamilton who went on to form Woodpigeon in Calgary, Canada. Eagleowl and Woodpigeon have regularly collaborated since. Bartholomew Owl and Malcolm Benzie played with Woodpigeon on their 2008 tour of UK and Ireland and feature on the EP Balladeer / For All The Guys I've Loved Before (2010: Boompa). Eagleowl also collaborated with Woodpigeon on their 2010 UK tour, culminating with a main stage set at End of the Road Festival. The creative friendship is celebrated in the Woodpigeon song Woodpigeon vs. Eagleowl (Strength in Numbers).

Bartholomew Owl has appeared as guest vocalist on the Meursault single William Henry Miller Pt. 2 (2009: Song, by Toad Records) and on Withered Hand's album Good News (2009: SL Records). Malcolm Benzie and Rob St John played on Withered Hand's album 'New Gods' (2014: Fortuna Pop!, Slumberland Records). Owen Williams also plays with the Glasgow band Two Wings.

== Discography ==
- "For the Thoughts You Never Had" (Fife Kills, 2008)
- "Sleep the Winter" (Kilter, 2009)
- "Into the Fold" (Kilter, 2010)
- "This Silent Year" (Fence Records, 2013)
