= Die Stadt Muzikanten =

Studio album by Woodpigeon
- Released: January 12, 2010
- Genre: Indie folk
- Labels: Boompa (U.S.); End of the Road (U.K./Europe)
- Producer: Arran Fisher

Woodpigeon chronology
Treasury Library Canada (2008)	Die Stadt Muzikanten (2010)

Die Stadt Muzikanten is the third studio album by Canadian indie rock band Woodpigeon, officially released on January 12, 2010. The album was released by Boompa Records in Canada, and is accompanied by a bonus EP, titled "Balladeer / To All the Guys I've Loved Before".

== Track listing ==
Songs and lyrics by Mark Hamilton

1. "Die Stadt Muzikanten"
2. "Woodpigeon vs. Eagleowl (Strength in Numbers)"
3. "Empty-Hall Sing-Along"
4. "Morningside"
5. "My Denial In Argyle"
6. "Enchantée Janvier"
7. "Such A Lucky Girl"
8. "Unmissable Grey, Mixed Paint"
9. "Duck Duck Goose"
10. "Spirehouse"
11. "Redbeard"
12. "The Street Noise Gives You Away"
13. "...And as the Ship Went Down, You'd Never Looked Finer"
14. "The Pesky Druthers (Parts 1 & 2)"
15. "Our Love is as Tall as the Calgary Tower"
