= Treasury Library Canada =

Studio album by Woodpigeon
- Released: 2008 (initial pressing); February 9, 2009
- Recorded: Acoustikitty, DP Ranch, Studios 827, Cantos Music Foundation
- Genre: Indie folk
- Length: 58:50
- Label: Boompa (U.S.); End of the Road (U.K./Europe)
- Producer: Arran Fisher

Woodpigeon chronology
Songbook (2006)	Treasury Library Canada (2008)	Die Stadt Muzikanten (2010)

Professional ratings
Review scores
Source	Rating
The 405	9/10 link
Daily Music Guide	link
The Line of Best Fit	85% link
Q	(pg. 105, Issue 272)

Treasury Library Canada is the second studio album by Canadian indie rock band Woodpigeon, self-released by the band in 2008, and later officially released in February 2009. The band initially noted that it was:

really only intended it as a between-album-album to tide things over on the upcoming UK tour and to give folks something new to listen to this summer, but it's getting props. If you ask us, it's really only Album #1.5. Album #2's on the way. But hey. How often is it that your tour CD gets written up in nice, big ways? We're not complaining. We've only printed 1,000 of them, and at the moment the big box at WPHQ has just dwindled down to 200 left.

However, after its official release in 2009, vocalist/guitarist Mark Hamilton stated that:

I consider Treasury Library Canada a proper record in its own right these days, given the reaction it’s received. Although, admittedly, when it was first released in our own self-pressed edition, that sold out in just a few weeks, I thought we were destined to print up 1000 of the things and then have 800 in my closet for the rest of time. As an album, I think its creation, however, is a little strange. The majority of the songs were either tunes written for Songbook and not used (otherwise I’d have made a double debut record, and where do you go from there?), or songs written while struggling with the recording and mixing of Songbook, so it almost felt like a sideline commentary on that for a while. In reflection, though, I think it’s actually brought a bit more awareness to the songs that are on it, because I largely didn’t think people would really be listening to these things. Thus the name Treasury Library Canada and the idea of pulling down some books from your childhood that you’d never even read then, and realizing how amazing they are.

== Track listing ==
Songs and lyrics by Mark Hamilton

1. "Knock Knock" – 4:30
2. "Piano Pieces For Adult Beginners" – 3:37
3. "In The Battle of Sun vs. Curtains, Sun Loses and We Sleep Until Noon" – 3:29
4. "I Live a Lot of Places" – 5:19
5. "Cities of Weather" – 3:25
6. "7th Fret Over Andres" – 4:44
7. "A Moment's Peace For Mary Christa O'Keefe" – 4:00
8. "Anna, Girl in the Clocktower" – 4:05
9. "The Hamilton Academicals" – 3:41
10. "Love in the Time of Hopscotch" – 4:29
11. "Emma et Hampus" – 4:49
12. "Now You Like Me How?" – 3:38
13. "Bad News Brown" – 3:50
14. "Tic Tac Toe / Woolen Endings" – 5:01

=== Houndstooth Europa ===
1. "In Praise of the West Midlothian Bus Service"
2. "Oberkampf"
3. "Thoughts on the One Who Got Away by the One he Left Behind"
4. "...a Given"
5. "Potsdamer Platz (Stomp, Stomp, Stomp)"
6. "Ladybug Ladybird"
7. "Matty John Chyzyk"
8. "Anybody Somebody Everybody"
9. "The Return Bus Ride Home"
10. "A Slight Return Home (Marshall's Homeless Remix)"
