= The Weight of the Sun =

Studio album by Modern Studies
- Released: 8 May 2020
- Studio: Pumpkinfield (Perth)
- Genre: Chamber pop; indie folk; indie pop; indie rock
- Length: 46:01
- Label: Fire

Modern Studies chronology
| Emergent Slow Arcs (2019) | The Weight of the Sun (2020) | We Are There (2022) |

The Weight of the Sun is the third studio album by the Scottish chamber pop band Modern Studies, released on 8 May 2020 by Fire Records.

== Critical reception ==
Professional ratings
Aggregate scores
| Source | Rating |
|---|---|
| Metacritic | 73/100 |
Review scores
| Source | Rating |
| AllMusic | 3.5/5 stars |
| Louder Than War | 4/5 stars |
| MusicOMH | 4/5 stars |

The Weight of the Sun was met with generally favourable reviews from critics. At Metacritic, which assigns a weighted average rating out of 100 to reviews from mainstream publications, this release received an average score of 73, based on 6 reviews.

== Track listing ==
The Weight of the Sun track listing
| No. | Title | Length |
|---|---|---|
| 1. | "Photograph" | 4:17 |
| 2. | "Run for Cover" | 3:33 |
| 3. | "Heavy Water" | 3:19 |
| 4. | "She" | 3:08 |
| 5. | "Corridors" | 3:21 |
| 6. | "Signs of Use" | 5:20 |
| 7. | "Brother" | 4:33 |
| 8. | "The Blue of Distance" | 3:38 |
| 9. | "Back to the City" | 3:25 |
| 10. | "Jacqueline" | 3:04 |
| 11. | "Spaces" | 4:12 |
| 12. | "Shape of Light" | 4:11 |
| Total length: | | 46:01 |

== Charts ==
Chart performance for The Weight of the Sun
| Chart (2020) | Peak position |
|---|---|
| Scottish Albums (OCC) | 64 |
| UK Independent Albums (OCC) | 40 |
