= Alan Bissett =

Scottish writer

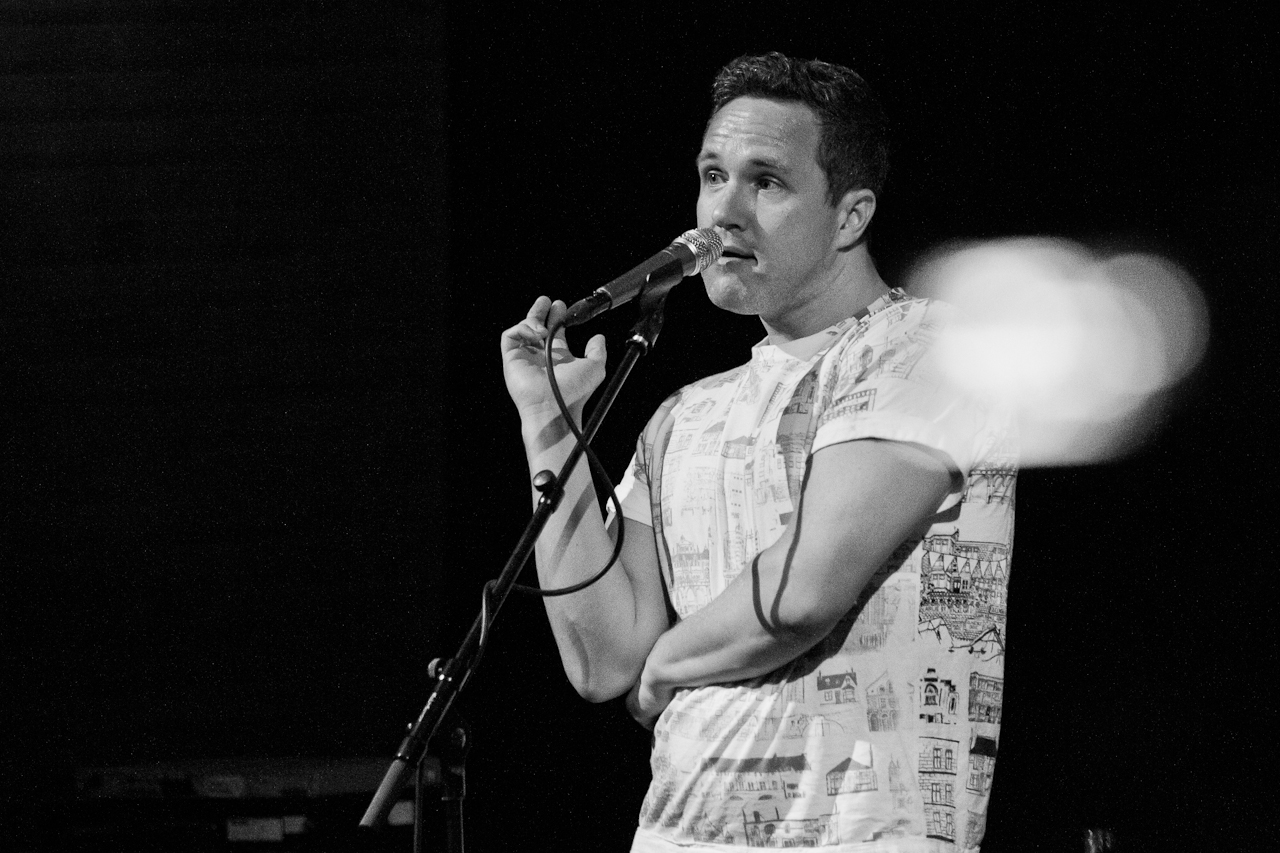
- Bissett at Authors' Reading Month, 2014
- Born: 17 November 1975 (age 50); Hallglen, Falkirk, Scotland
- Education: University of Stirling
- Occupations: Novelist, playwright
- Writing career
- Notable works: Boyracers; The Incredible Adam Spark; Death of a Ladies' Man
- Website: www.alanbissett.com

Alan Bissett (born 17 November 1975) is a Scottish author and playwright. He became known for his alternative take on Scots dialect writing with the publication of his first two novels; Boyracers and The Incredible Adam Spark, developing a style specific to his hometown of Falkirk while incorporating popular culture references and socialist politics.

Bissett formerly lectured in creative writing at Bretton Hall College, now part of the University of Leeds, and tutored the creative writing MLitt at the University of Glasgow alongside Janice Galloway and Tom Leonard. He also applied to be rector of the University of Glasgow in 2014. He became a full-time writer in December 2007. In March 2012, he became a "Cultural Ambassador" for National Collective, a creative organisation which supports Scottish independence.

== Background ==
Bissett was born in 1975. He attended Falkirk High School and then the University of Stirling, where he gained a First-Class Honours degree in English literature and education. After a short spell as a secondary-school teacher at Elgin Academy, Bissett was awarded a master's degree in English from the University of Stirling, during which time he edited a collection of Scottish Gothic stories, Damage Land (2001), and wrote his first novel, Boyracers. His stories were either short- or longlisted for the national Macallan Short-Story Competition four times between 1999 and 2002. His third novel, Death of a Ladies' Man, was published by Hachette Scotland in July 2009. In 2009 Bissett moved into playwriting: his first play, The Ching Room, was performed at Oran Mor and Traverse Theatre in March 2009, starring Andy Clarke and Colin McCredie. It was followed by Times When I Bite, or The Moira Monologues a "one-woman show" that Bissett has performed himself (at Glasgow literary festival Aye Write! in March 2009, at the Kikinda Short Story Festival in Serbia in June 2009, and at the Traverse Theatre in November 2009. In an interview with the Sunday Times, Bissett described the inspiration for the character of Moira Bell.

"The voice comes from the women in my family, my three aunties and my sister, who are great storytellers and hard as f***,” he says. "If they were to go on stage and talk about their lives in their own voices, it would be acclaimed as a virtuoso performance."

Bissett was also a regular performer at and co-organiser of Glasgow spoken word night Discombobulate .

== Bibliography ==
=== Novels ===
- Boyracers (2001)
- The Incredible Adam Spark (2005)
- Death of a Ladies' Man (2009)
- Pack Men (2011)

=== Non Fiction ===
- Lads: Hachette Children's Group: Wren & Rook, 2023

=== Anthologies ===
- Damage Land: New Scottish Gothic Fiction (2001) (editor)
- In the Event of Fire: New Writing Scotland 27 (July 2009) (co-editor with Liz Niven)
- Stone Going Home Again: New Writing Scotland 28 (July 2010) (co-editor with Carl MacDougall)
- The Year of Open Doors (July 2010) (contributor)
- The Flight of the Turtle: New Writing Scotland 29 (July 2011) (co-editor with Carl MacDougall)
- Collected Plays (March 2015)

== Awards ==
- 2012 Glenfiddich Scottish Writer of the Year
- 2016 Fringe First Winner
- 2024 The School Library Association’s Information Book Award

== Music ==
Bissett also collaborated with musician Malcolm Middleton for the song "The Rebel on His Own Tonight", writing the lyrics and performing a spoken word section, for the Ballads of the Book project, bringing together Scottish writers with Scottish musicians, spearheaded by Roddy Woomble and Edwin Morgan.

Inspired by this experience, Bissett approached bands Zoey Van Goey and Y'all is Fantasy Island suggesting they perform together. In May 2007, all three performed together in a short tour of Central Scotland. The tour, called Super Puny Humans played in Edinburgh on 2 May, Glasgow on the third, Stirling on the fourth and finally Falkirk on the fifth. Since then, Bissett has regularly performed his writing at concerts in support slots for various bands, including the first-ever comeback gig of The Vaselines, and the "Music Like A Vitamin" night at ABC Glasgow, run by Rod Jones from Idlewild in support of Mental Health Week. He also performed spoken word sets at the Connect Music Festival in 2007 and 2008, and at Crossing Border Festival in 2007.

== Film ==
In 2009, The Shutdown, a short documentary Bissett wrote (and narrated) about the experience of growing up in the shadow of the Grangemouth Oil Refinery, with particular mention of his father's injury in the refinery flare line incident of 13 March 1987 premiered in competition at Edinburgh International Film Festival, IDFA and Silverdocs, was shortlisted for the Scottish Short Documentary Award and won both the Jury and Audience Awards for Scottish Short Film at the Jim Poole Scottish Short Film Awards. The Shutdown was directed by Adam Stafford, and later picked up for distribution by Accidental Media.
