= Songbook (Woodpigeon album) =

Studio album by Woodpigeon
- Released: 2006; 2008 (U.K.)
- Recorded: 2005 at Acoustikitty and Cantos Music Foundation
- Genre: Indie folk,
- Length: 55:30
- Label: End of the Road Records (U.K./Europe)
- Producer: Arran Fisher

Woodpigeon chronology
Songbook (2006)	Treasury Library Canada (2008)

Songbook is the debut studio album by Canadian indie rock band Woodpigeon, originally released in 2006.

Vocalist/guitarist Mark Hamilton states that the album:

is a diary set to music of my return to Canada, told in flashback after the introduction of "Home as a Romanticized Concept Where Everyone Loves You Always and Forever." "I wanted to wrap sad words with pretty pop music. I wanted to build a mini-orchestra with my friends. I wanted to make a record that was both small and huge, and sometimes both of those things at the same time. Some people get over things by talking about them to anyone who’ll listen, but for me, it’s a lot easier to just sing my heart out and hope whoever’s listening gets a little something out of it too."

== Track listing ==
1. "Home As a Romanticized Concept Where Everyone Loves You Always and Forever" – 3:44
2. "Chorus of Wolves" – 3:21
3. "The Alison Yip School for Girls" – 4:04
4. "Ms. Stacey Watson Stepney Green" – 3:43
5. "A Sad Country Ballad for a Tired Superhero" – 3:46
6. "A Hymn for Two Walks In Different Cities" – 7:19
7. "Feedbags" – 1:56
8. "If Only I Were a Painter, I'd Paint for You the Moon" – 3:02
9. "Take The Hint Kid" – 3:46
10. "Death By Ninja (A Love Song)" – 4:25
11. "Jonothan Ashworth Rollercoaster" – 3:11
12. "Songbook/The Sound of Us Playing Together" – 2:43
13. "A Slight Return Home" – 4:46
14. "That Was Good But You Can Do Better/Closing Credits" – 5:38
