= Death of a Ladies' Man (album) =

Studio album by Leonard Cohen
- Released: November 1977
- Recorded: June—July 1977
- Genres: Soft rock; contemporary folk
- Length: 42:31
- Labels: Warner Bros. (original release); Columbia (reissue)
- Producer: Phil Spector

Leonard Cohen chronology
| New Skin for the Old Ceremony (1974) | Death of a Ladies' Man (1977) | Recent Songs (1979) |

Singles from Death of a Ladies' Man
- 1. "Memories" Released: December 1977; 2. "True Love Leaves No Traces" Released: March 1978

Death of a Ladies' Man is the fifth studio album by Leonard Cohen, produced and co-written by Phil Spector. The album was in some ways a departure from Cohen's typical minimalist style by using Spector's Wall of Sound recording method, which included ornate arrangements and multiple tracks of instrument overdubs. The album was originally released in the US by Warner Bros., and on CD and the rest of the world by Cohen's longtime label, Columbia Records.

== Background ==
By the mid-1970s, both Cohen and Spector were on a downward slide commercially. Although he remained popular in Europe, Cohen had never achieved the success in the United States that Columbia had hoped for. Spector had created hits such as "Be My Baby" and "You've Lost That Lovin' Feelin'" with his "wall of sound" production technique in the 1960s, and had some success in the early 1970s by producing albums by John Lennon and George Harrison; however, his behavior was increasingly erratic.

As Ira Nadel notes in his 1996 Cohen biography, Various Positions: A Life of Leonard Cohen, stories differ as to how Cohen and Spector became collaborators:

The liner notes on the album state that Marty Machat, who was Spector's lawyer as well as Cohen's, introduced them. According to Cohen, this occurred backstage after one of his performances at the Troubadour in L.A. Spector had uncharacteristically left his well-protected home to see Cohen, and at the show was strangely silent. Spector then invited Cohen back to his home, which, because of the air-conditioning, was very chilly, about "thirty-two degrees," Cohen recalled...Spector locked the door and Cohen reacted by saying, "As long as we are locked up, we might as well write some songs together." They went to the piano and started that night. For about a month they wrote (and drank) together and Cohen remembers it as a generous period, although he had to wear an overcoat almost constantly to work in Spector's freezing home.

Biographer Anthony Reynolds writes in the 2010 book Leonard Cohen: A Remarkable Life that Cohen's friend and fellow Canadian songwriter Joni Mitchell tried to warn Cohen about working with Spector, Mitchell having witnessed some of Spector's erratic behavior during recording sessions with Lennon in Los Angeles. However, at least at the early songwriting stage, Cohen and Spector worked well together. Songwriter John Prine, who had also witnessed the producer's bizarre antics when he had been invited to his house to compose a song together, later marveled to Paul Zollo of BluebirdRailroad magazine that as soon as Spector "sat down with an instrument, he was normal." Things would change once Cohen and Spector entered a studio, with the producer's paranoia taking over and Cohen becoming increasingly disengaged from the project.

== Recording ==
Spector would use three studios for the album, although his favorite remained the Gold Star Studios complex located at 6252 Santa Monica Boulevard near the corner of Vine Street in Hollywood. Spector recruited a plethora of top-shelf Los Angeles studio musicians to play on the songs, including guitarists Dan and David Kessel, drummers Hal Blaine and Jim Keltner, and pedal steel player Al Perkins, among many others. It was precisely in front of an audience, however, that Spector's megalomaniacal switch turned on, and soon Cohen felt overwhelmed. Speaking to Mojo's Sylvie Simmons in 2001, Cohen described his feelings at the time:

It was one of those periods when my chops were impaired, and I wasn't in the right kind of condition to resist Phil's very strong influence on and eventual takeover of the record. There were lots of guns around in the studio and lots of liquor, a somewhat dangerous atmosphere. He had bodyguards who were heavily armed also. He liked guns - I liked guns too but I generally don't carry one, and it's hard to ignore a .45 lying on the console. When I was working with him alone, it was very agreeable, but the more people in the room, the wilder Phil would get. I couldn't help but admire the extravagance of his performance, but at the time couldn't really hold my own.

During a cryptic exchange detailed in Various Positions, Spector pointed a loaded pistol at Cohen's throat, cocked it, and said, "I love you, Leonard." Quietly, Cohen responded, "I hope you love me, Phil." Nadel also writes that the recording of the nine-minute title track began at 7:30 in the evening and lasted until 2:30 in the morning with the session musicians working on quadruple time, typical of the sessions as a whole. Another night, poet Allen Ginsberg and Bob Dylan showed up and were ordered by Spector to sing background vocals on the raucously burlesque "Don't Go Home With Your Hard-on". Most of the songs deal with themes of unbridled sexuality and brutal voyeurism, such as "Paper Thin Hotel" ("The walls of this hotel are paper thin/Last night I heard you making love to him..."), and are couched in Spector's bombastic sprawl of sonic grandeur. The buoyant "Fingerprints" is a fiddle-infused hootenanny that recalls Cohen's love of country music. Early versions of "Iodine" (then called "Guerrero") and "Don't Go Home with Your Hard-on" were performed in concert as early as 1975 (with music credited to John Lissauer) and are widely available on bootlegs. As Anthony Reynolds reports in his 2010 Cohen biography, the sessions did not even "officially" end:

One day Phil just failed to return to the studio, keeping all the tapes (as he had done with Lennon's masters) and going on to mix them alone. Cohen was aghast. He did not consider his recorded vocals to be anywhere near definitive. As far as he was concerned they were merely "guide" vocals for the benefit of the musicians. He had expected to be able to take time on his singing but with Spector holding the tapes hostage at an unknown location this now seemed impossible, unless he brought his own bunch of heavies to take on Spector's. "I had the option of hiring my own private army and fighting it out with him on Sunset Boulevard or letting it go...I let it go."

Marty Machat's son Steven Machat secured a deal with Warner Bros. to release the record, one that Cohen would always harbor mixed feelings about. "I'm too ashamed to tell the whole truth of what happened there", Cohen confessed to Adrian Deevoy of Q magazine in 1991. "People were skating around on bullets, guns were finding their way into hamburgers, guns were all over the place. It wasn't safe. It was mayhem, but it was part of the times. It was rather drug-driven. But I like Phil, and the instinct was right. I'd do it again." Interviewed for the 2005 documentary I'm Your Man, Cohen expressed disappointment in the record and felt that the songs "got away" from him; he also noted that it was a favorite among "punksters" as well as his daughter. At the time of the album's release, however, he was much less generous in his public response to the album, calling Spector's production "a 'catastrophe'". Of the album's eight selections, "Memories" is the only track Cohen regularly performed in concert (on tours in 1979, 1980 and 1985). He apparently liked the song enough that he included it in his 1983 experimental art film I Am a Hotel, as the sole non-acoustic piece alongside four other songs which have generally enjoyed more positive fan response: "Suzanne", "Chelsea Hotel #2", "The Guests", and "The Gypsy's Wife". A "de-Spectorized" version of "Memories" ended up being released when Cohen's album Field Commander Cohen: Tour of 1979 was issued in 2001. This version includes a saxophone solo different from that of the album version's.

In 1978, Cohen would release a book of poetry with the slightly altered title Death of a Lady's Man. It has nothing in common with the album, with only one exception: it contains the poem "Death of a Lady's Man", which is identical to the lyrics of the album's title song.

== Album cover ==
The liner notes of the Cohen album disclose that the photo was taken by an "Anonymous Roving Photographer at a Forgotten Polynesian Restaurant". It features Eva LaPierre, Cohen, Suzanne Elrod, and Lorca Cohen.

== Reception ==
=== Critical reception ===
Professional ratings
Review scores
| Source | Rating |
|---|---|
| AllMusic | 4/5 stars |
| Christgau's Record Guide | B− |
| Sounds | favorable |
| Spin Alternative Record Guide | 5/10 |
| Uncut | 2/5 stars |

Death of a Ladies' Man was released to universal confusion and polarized reviews, leaving many die-hard Cohen fans stunned. In his review for Rolling Stone, Paul Nelson wrote that Death of a Ladies' Man is "either greatly flawed or great and flawed" and observed, "Too much of the record sounds like the world's most flamboyant extrovert producing and arranging the world's most fatalist introvert." Nelson criticized Spector's contributions to the album, such as his Wall of Sound, as "anything but lethal", particularly the track "Memories" that was characterized as a "doo-wop nightmare". The Toronto Star declared in large type, "Leonard Cohen is for Musical Sadists".

==== Reappraisal ====
While defending the album, in a retrospective review, AllMusic writer Dave Thompson concedes, "It is also true that a cursory listen to the album suggests that the whole thing was simply a ragbag of crazy notions thrown into the air to see where they landed." In 2010, Cohen biographer Anthony Reynolds singled out "True Love Leaves No Traces" for praise, describing the song, which Cohen sings with Ronee Blakley, as "incandescently beautiful as anything either man would ever commit to tape".

Thomas Coll of Far Out Magazine, in a retrospective review from 2022 marking the album's 45th anniversary, placed blame on Phil Spector's production for Death of a Ladies' Man not feeling like a traditional Leonard Cohen album. Cohen's sound had previously been defined by minimalist instrumentation but Coll writes that, on Death of a Ladies' Man, "Cohen's eternally beautiful lyrics are entirely overshadowed by the utterly unnecessary complex instrumentation".

=== Commercial performance ===
Up to 1978, the album was one of Cohen's biggest sellers in Sweden.

== Cover versions and live performances ==
Death of a Ladies' Man has inspired fewer cover versions than any preceding Cohen album, but both "True Love Leaves No Traces" and "Don't Go Home with Your Hard-on" were covered on the Cohen tribute album I'm Your Fan. The songs were performed by Dead Famous People and the duo David McComb & Adam Peters, respectively. "Memories" has also been covered by at least five other artists, including John Darnielle of The Mountain Goats and Will Toledo of Car Seat Headrest, although the latter modified the lyrics considerably. "Iodine" earned three known performances in Cohen's European tour of 1979. The Last Shadow Puppets performed a version of "Memories" on their autumn 2008 tour. Swedish singer Svante Karlsson mentioned the album title in the song "I Nöd & Lust" (from Tro Inte Att Du Känner Mig 2010) in which the female character listens to it in her head phones during a train ride. In 2013, Guitars and Bongos Records released Greg Ashley's cover version of the entire Death of a Ladies' Man album. Kimberly Morrison, a.k.a. "The Duchess" from The Duchess and The Duke! provides backing vocals. Ashley's cover photo mimics Cohen's original photo, but replaces actual women with two mannequins.

== Track listing ==
All lyrics are written by Leonard Cohen; all music is composed by Phil Spector.

Side one
| No. | Title | Length |
|---|---|---|
| 1. | "True Love Leaves No Traces" | 4:26 |
| 2. | "Iodine" | 5:03 |
| 3. | "Paper Thin Hotel" | 5:42 |
| 4. | "Memories" ( (Note: Outro includes a quotation from The Shields' 1958 single "You Cheated, You Lied" and a reference to classic-era pop singer Frankie Laine.)) | 5:59 |
| Total length: | | 21:10 |

Side two
| No. | Title | Length |
|---|---|---|
| 5. | "I Left a Woman Waiting" | 3:28 |
| 6. | "Don't Go Home with Your Hard-On" | 5:36 |
| 7. | "Fingerprints" | 2:58 |
| 8. | "Death of a Ladies' Man" | 9:19 |
| Total length: | | 21:21 42:31 |

== Personnel ==
- Guitar: Jesse Ed Davis, David Isaac, David Kessel, Art Munson, Phil Spector
- Steel guitar: Sneaky Pete Kleinow, Al Perkins
- Bass guitar, double bass: Ray Neapolitan, Ray Pohlman
- Keyboards: Barry Goldberg, Tom Hensley, Pete Jolly, Michael Lang, Bill Mays, Don Randi, Devra Robitaille
- Drums: Hal Blaine, Jim Keltner
- Keyboards, backing vocals: David Kessel, Phil Spector
- Percussion: Gene Estes, Terry Gibbs, Emil Richards, Bob Zimmitti
- Keyboards, backing vocals, guitar: Dan Kessel
- Saxophone, flute: Steve Douglas, Don Menza, Jay Migliori
- Fiddle, violin: Bobby Bruce
- Trumpet: Conte Candoli
- Trombone: Charles Loper, Jack Redmond
- Backing Vocals: Ronee Blakley, Brenda Bryant, Billy Diez, Oma Drake, Bob Dylan, Venetta Fields, Gerald Garrett, Allen Ginsberg, Clydie King, Sherlie Matthews, Bill Thedford, Julia Waters Tillman, Oren Waters, Lorna Willard

== Charts ==
| Chart (1977) | Peak position |
|---|---|
| Australian Albums (Kent Music Report) | 85 |
| French Albums (SNEP) | 10 |
| Norwegian Albums (VG-lista) | 20 |
| Swedish Albums (Sverigetopplistan) | 15 |
| UK Albums (Official Charts) | 35 |

== Book ==
Cohen published the book Death of a Lady's Man in 1978. It has nothing in common with the album, with only one exception: it contains the poem "Death of a Lady's Man", which is identical to the lyrics of the album's title song but with a slightly different spelling in the title.

In 2009, Scottish author Alan Bissett released his third novel, Death of a Ladies' Man, which makes references to Cohen throughout the text.
