= Authors' Reading Month =

- (Měsíc autorského čtení)
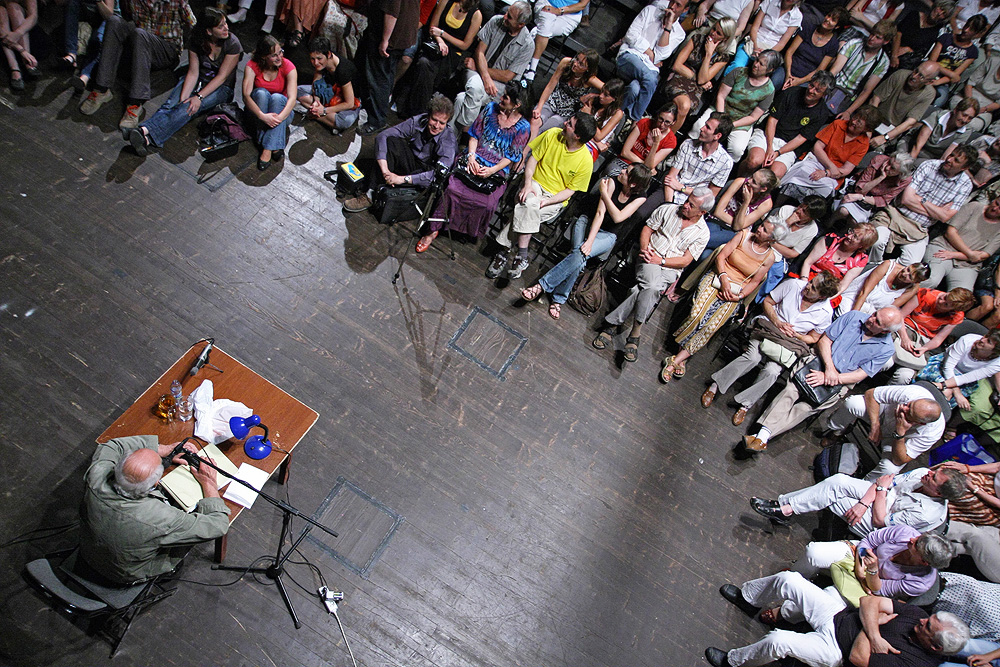
- Arnošt Lustig, Authors' Reading Month 2009, Brno, Czech Republic
- Interactive map of Authors' Reading Month
- Address: Dominikánská 9, 602 00 Brno; Brno; Czech Republic
- Coordinates: 49.1934056°N 16.6065217°E
- Owner: Větrné mlýny Publishers

Construction
- Opened: 1 July 2000

Website
- www.autorskecteni.cz

Authors' Reading Month is the largest Central European literary festival running annually since 2000. The organiser is the Větrné mlýny Publishers, (Brno, Czech Republic) and the festival takes place every July 1–31. Every day 2–3 readings take place performed by writers of the host country and writers from the festival guest country.

As of 2016, the festival takes place in 5 cities simultaneously, spanning 4 countries: Brno and Ostrava (Czech Republic), Wrocław (Poland), Košice (Slovakia), and Lviv (Ukraine). In 2020 the festival's guest country was Hungary.

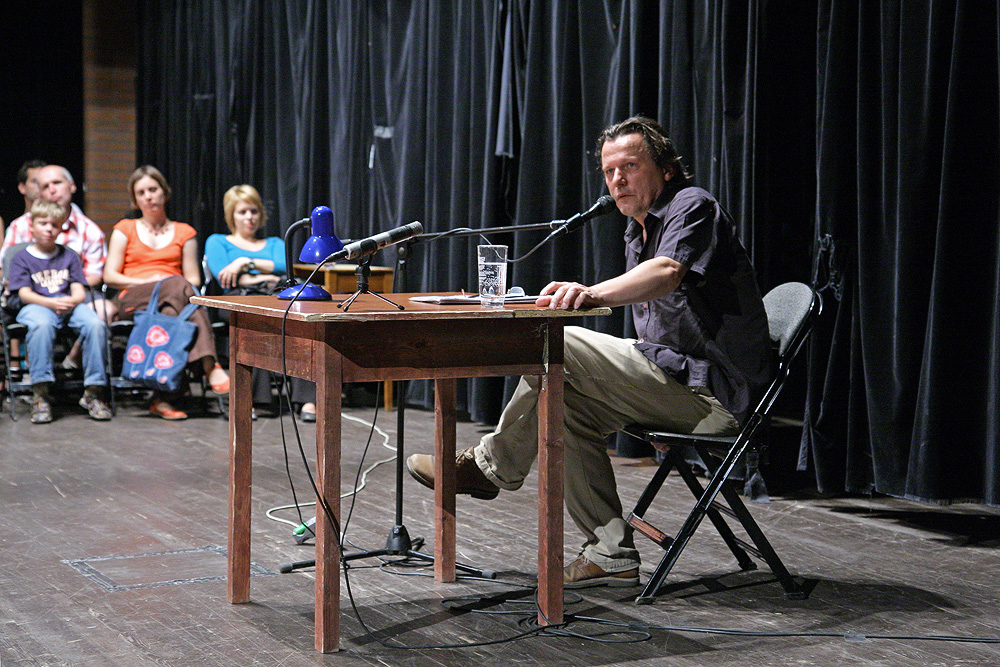
Jan Balabán at the Authors' Reading Month 2009, Brno, Czech Republic

== History ==
In the years 2000–2004 the main festival venue was the Kabinet múz (formerly HaDivadlo). Since 2005 the venue has been the Husa na provázku Theatre in Brno, Czech Republic. Since 2016 the festival runs parallel in 5 cities in 4 countries. The readings are also available online at the Publishers YouTube channel, and broadcast by radios.

In the years 2000–2004 the festival was dedicated only to Czech writers, featuring one performing author per day. Since 2005 the festival has hosted a guest country every year, offering 2–3 readings every day, one by the homeland author and another by a foreign writer from the guest country. The guest countries of the past years are these:

- 2005 Slovakia
- 2006 Berlin (Germany)
- 2007 Belarus
- 2008 Canada
- 2009 Austria and Stuttgart
- 2010 France (since this year the festival has run a parallel venue in Ostrava)
- 2011 Poland (since this year the festival has run parallel venues in Wrocław and Košice)
- 2012 Slovenia
- 2013 German-language authors
- 2014 Scotland (10 TV documentaries of Scottish writers were made by the Czech Television.
- 2015 Ukraine (since this year the festival has run a parallel venue in Lviv; TV documentaries with Ukrainian writers were made by the Czech Television)
- 2016 Spain
- 2017 Georgia
- 2018 Turkey
- 2019 Romania
- 2020 Hungary
- 2022 Iceland
- 2023 Norway
- 2024 Taiwan
- 2025 EXILE (Authors in exile and asylum seekers)
- 2026 Greenland
