= Good News (Withered Hand album) =

Studio album by Withered Hand
- Released: 14 September 2009 (in the UK on B&D), 5 March 2011 (on Absolutely Kosher)
- Genre: Indie rock
- Length: 38:57
- Label: SL; Absolutely Kosher
- Producer: Kramer

Withered Hand chronology
Good News (2009)	New Gods (2014)

Good News is the first full-length album by British artist Dan Willson, also known as Withered Hand. Originally released on 14 September 2009 in the UK on SL Records, it was re-released on Absolutely Kosher Records in 2011 in the US. The album's title is a reference to Willson's upbringing as a Jehovah's Witness. The album was funded by the Scottish Arts Council.

Maggoty Lamb has written that "If you want to hear an album that genuinely does justice to the manna-from-heaven style succour that Domino Records' pre-Franz Ferdinand roster of US acoustic misfits gave to those wandering in the post-Britpop wilderness, Good News by Withered Hand...is the one to go for. Not so much for its explicit acknowledgement of aesthetic debt (lines about writing "the Silver Jews" on people's shoulder bags will only take you so far) as for the authentically homegrown twist the songwriting manages to put on its transatlantic influences".

Professional ratings
Aggregate scores
Source	Rating
Metacritic	85/100
Review scores
Source	Rating
AllMusic	4/5 stars
Blurt	positive
The List	4/5 stars
MSN Music (Expert Witness)	A−
The Phoenix	3.5/4 stars
PopMatters	8/10 stars
Rolling Stone	3.5/5 stars
The Skinny	4/5 stars

== Track listing ==
All songs written by Dan Willson unless otherwise indicated.

1. "Providence"
2. "Cornflake"
3. "Love in the Time of Ecstasy"
4. "Joy" (written by Dan Mutch)
5. "New Dawn"
6. "Religious Songs"
7. "No Cigarettes"
8. "I Am Nothing"
9. "Hard On" (Charles Latham cover)
10. "For the Maudlin"
