= Rob St. John =

- Origin: Lancashire
- Genres: Experimental, Sound Art, Indie folk
- Years active: Early-2000s–present
- Label: Song, by Toad Records
- Website: www.robstjohn.co.uk

Rob St. John is an English writer, artist and musician.

== Early life ==
Rob St. John was born in Lancashire, and spent his childhood living on Pendle Hill.

== Career ==
=== Music ===
St. John's debut album, Weald, was released in November 2011, and received a positive reception from critics. This Is Fake DIY described it as "special, surprising and utterly magnificent". Andrew Collins of BBC 6 Music named it his album of the year. St. John wrote the original music for the Jeremy Deller and Nick Abrahams film The Bruce Lacey Experience, and in 2012 produced the Folklore Tapes "Pendle, 1612" compilation album with David Chatton Barker, commemorating the anniversary of the Pendle Witch Trials. St. John has contributed to Modern Studies, Eagleowl, Meursault, Woodpigeon and Withered Hand.

=== Environmental Art ===
St. John has produced a number of varied artworks, with landscape, sound and the environment as common themes. Water of Life (2013), with Tommy Perman, explored water in the city of Edinburgh through visual art, writing and sound; the solo project Surface Tension (2015) used sound art and photography to document pollution in the River Lea in London and was shown at Stour Space, London and The Lighthouse, Glasgow; and a sound installation Concrete Antenna (2015), with Tommy Perman and Simon Kirby, exhibited at the Edinburgh Sculpture Workshop through 2015–16. Emergent Landscapes (2016) was a participatory installation at Switch House, Tate Modern, involving collaborative cairn sculpture, soundscape creation and film work using manipulated Super 8. Soundmarks is a collaboration launched in 2019 with archaeologist Rose Ferraby to use sound and visual art to explore sub-surface landscapes at the Roman town of Aldborough. The project uses field recordings to create an imagined sonic trail around the Roman village, which can be listened to on site or online.

=== Writing ===
St. John writes on music, art and the environment, and is a cultural geography researcher at the University of Glasgow.

== Discography ==
=== Albums ===
- Weald (2011), Song, by Toad
- Farewell, Bastard Mountain (2014), Song, by Toad (as part of Bastard Mountain)
- Surface Tension (2015) Pattern + Process
- Concrete Antenna (2016) Random Spectacular
- Swell to Great (2017) Fire Records (as part of Modern Studies)
- Welcome Strangers (2018) Fire Records (as part of Modern Studies)

=== EPs ===
- Tipping In (2007), Fife Kills: records
- Like Alchemy (2008), Fife Kills: records
- Young Sun | Trouble Comes (2015), Song, by Toad (split 10-inch EP with Woodpigeon)

=== Singles ===
- Your Phantom Limb (2011), Song, by Toad (split 7-inch single with Ian Humberstone)
- The Charcoal Black and the Bonny Grey (2013), Song, by Toad (7-inch single)
- Water of Life (2013), Imagining Natural Scotland (7-inch single)
