= Lost in Space discography =

- Soundtrack albums: 5

There have been a number of CDs released featuring soundtracks from the television series Lost in Space.

== Lost in Space Vol. 1 ==
GNP Crescendo released the first album in 1997 as part of The Fantasy Worlds of Irwin Allen, featuring music from "The Reluctant Stowaway" (tracks 2–5), "Island in the Sky" (tracks 6 and 7) and "The Hungry Sea" (tracks 8–10).

All music composed by John Williams.

1. Lost in Space Main Title (:56)
2. Smith's Evening/Judo Chop/On the Pad/Countdown (8:54)
3. Escape Velocity/Robot Control/Meteor Storm/Defrosting (7:58)
4. The Weightless Waltz (2:30)
5. The Monster Rebels/A Walk in Space/Finale (7:49)
6. Suiting Up/Stranglehold/The Landing/Search for John (12:20)
7. Tractor Play-on/Electric Sagebrush/Will Is Threatened (2:30)
8. The Earthquake (2:44)
9. Chariot Titles/Fahrenheit a Go-Go/The Chariot Continues/Sunstorm (3:41)
10. Morning After/The Inland Sea/Land Ho/Strange Visitor (7:54)
11. Lost in Space End Title (:50)

== Lost in Space Vol. 2 ==
GNP Crescendo released the second album in 1997 as part of the abovementioned set, featuring music from "Wild Adventure" (tracks 2–4), "The Haunted Lighthouse" (tracks 5 and 6), and "The Great Vegetable Rebellion" (tracks 7 and 8).

Tracks in bold contain themes composed by John Williams.

1. Lost in Space Main Title: Season 3 – John Williams (1:03)
2. **Million Miles**/Dust Ball/Episode Titles – Alexander Courage (2:36)
3. **Pushy Fellow** – Alexander Courage (2:40)
4. Flying "A" Statin/Floating Lady/The Big Whew/Irwin Van Belt – Alexander Courage (8:48)
5. **Opening Scene**/J-5/Take-Off/F-12/Colonel Fogey/Penny And J-5/A Zaybo For Smith/Turkey Dinner/Act-Out on J-5 – Joseph Mullendore (10:30)
6. J-5 Listens to Penny/J-5 to the Rescue/Last Scene – Joseph Mullendore (4:22)
7. A Plant Planet – Alexander Courage (2:39)
8. Episode Titles/Howling Hyacinths/The Vegetable/Sprouting Smith/Vic's Smithy/Judy's Goat/The Dry Boys/Caught by a Carrot – Alexander Courage (11:43)
9. Lost in Space End Title: Season 3 – John Williams (:51)

== Lost in Space Vol. 3 ==
GNP Crescendo released the third album in 2000, featuring music from "The Derelict" by Richard LaSalle, Herman Stein and Hans J. Salter (tracks 1 and 3–11) and "My Friend Mr. Nobody" by John Williams (tracks 12–17).

Single-asterisked cues by Richard LaSalle. **by Herman Stein. ***by Hans J. Salter.

Tracks in bold contain themes composed by John Williams.

1. Rescued From Space*/The Comet Cometh** (8:36)
2. Lost in Space Main Title: Season 1 – John Williams (:58)
3. Derelict Title**/Don Rescues John and Maureen* (5:30)
4. **The Robot Performs*** (1:19)
5. Writing In The Log*/Family** (1:58)
6. The Treatment*/Swallowed** (4:18)
7. Flashing Lights***/Frontal Robotomy*** (:39)
8. Filmy Spider Web***/Crystalline Power Source*** (3:30)
9. Smart Kid***/Bubble Monster* (5:30)
10. Lift Off*** (4:21)
11. New Planet*/Continued Next Week** (01:34)
12. Wonderland Discovery (2:58)
13. Hairstyle Book/Penny's Friend/Diamonds/Penny/Diamond Play Off (4:13)
14. Penny's Cave/To The Cave/Gathering Wild Flowers/Moving Rocks (5:44)
15. Mother & Daughter/Penny's Problem (5:54)
16. Storm Coming Up/A New Galaxy (3:57)
17. Lost in Space End Credits: Season 1 – John Williams (:53)
18. Lost in Space Unused 2nd Season Main Title – Warren Barker (:48)

== Lost in Space 40th Anniversary Edition ==
In 2005 La-La Land Records released a two-disc set covering many of the series' composers. Cues in bold are previously unreleased.

Disc 1: "The Reluctant Stowaway" (tracks 2–7), "Island In The Sky" (tracks 8–15), "The Hungry Sea" (tracks 16–19) and "My Friend Mr. Nobody" (tracks 20–21); all music by John Williams. Although all four episodes were represented on the previous albums, not all of the music is replicated here.

1. Lost in Space Season 1 Main Title (:53)
2. Smith's Entrance (2:45)
3. Final Countdown (4:33)
4. Escape Velocity/Meteor Storm (5:41)
5. Weightless Waltz (3:37)
6. Monster Rebels (3:40)
7. Walk In Space/**To Be Continued** (7:35)
8. **Strange Planet/John's Descent (1:30)**
9. **Helmet It (1:19)**
10. Strangle Hold/Landing (6:24)
11. **Lil’ Will And The Robot (1:29)**
12. Search For John (4:13)
13. **Monkey's Doo (4:52)**
14. **Operation Rescue (1:16)**
15. Personal Chauffeur/Electric Sagebrush/Will Is Threatened (2:34)
16. Earthquake (2:45)
17. **Temperature Rising/Boring Company/Don's Rays (4:08)**
18. **Warming Rays**/Sun Storm (3:00)
19. Land Ho/**Kid's Play-Off** (2:36)
20. Wonderland Discovery/Penny's Problem/Gathering Wild Flowers (9:33)
21. New Galaxy (2:26)
22. Lost in Space Season 1 End Title (:50)

Disc 2

1. "CBS Presents This Special Program In Color" (:08)
2. Lost in Space Season 3 Main Title – John Williams (1:02)
3. "The Derelict": Derelict Title (Herman Stein)/Frontal Robotomy (Hans J. Salter)/Family (Herman Stein)(2:00)
4. "There Were Giants In The Earth": Microscope/Pod Almighty – Herman Stein (1:49)
5. **"Welcome Stranger": Stranger/Friend Or Foe/Permission/Spore Sprayer/The Robinsons/Upper-Ration/Hapgood/Star Charts (Frank Comstock)/Tall Tail/Blast Off (Frank Comstock) – Herman Stein except where indicated (17:33)**
6. **Lost in Space Season 3 Bumper – John Williams (:05)**
7. **"Blast Off Into Space": The Family/Quake/Mine Entrance/Galaxies Wins/Spilled Cosmonium/It's Alive/Cosmonium Fiend/One Last Check/Family/Blast Off/Thruster Control Short/Thruster Control Continued/Freeze Frame – Leith Stevens (15:58)**
8. **"The Curse Of Cousin Smith": Mississippi Shuffle – Robert Drasnin (1:28)**
9. **"The Curse Of Cousin Smith": Little Joe's Yes – Robert Drasnin (1:22)**
10. **"Girl From The Green Dimension": Mulberry Bush/What A Knight – Alexander Courage (4:26)**
11. **"Cave Of The Wizards": Mummy's Boy/Draconian Anthem/King Queen – Alexander Courage (5:16)**
12. **"Collision Of Planets": The Aliens/Sampson March/1st Blast – Gerald Fried (3:27)**
13. "The Promised Planet": Space-A-Delic – Pete Rugolo (3:50)
14. **Senior – from "The Sky Pirate" (Leigh Harline)/Introduction – from "Ghost In Space" (Leigh Harline)/The Search – from "The Sky Pirate" (Lionel Newman) (3:58)**
15. **"The Sky Pirate": A Nice Little Bank/Investigation (Cyril Mockridge) (2:52)**
16. **"Space Circus": Terror Stinger/Another World/Ominous Signs/Awful Monster/Silly Monster – Fred Steiner (8:02)**
17. **"Forbidden World": Space Walk – Robert Drasnin (:39)**
18. Lost in Space Season 2 Main Title (unused) – Warren Barker (:58)
19. Lost in Space Season 3 End Title – John Williams (1:09)

"Space-A-Delic" was previously released as part of the bonus CD in the box set The Fantasy Worlds Of Irwin Allen.

== Lost in Space: 50th Anniversary Soundtrack Collection ==
In 2015 La-La Land Records issued a 12-disc boxed set of music from the series, featuring all the episode scores and the tracked-in music for the unaired pilot "No Place To Hide" (which used music by Bernard Herrmann, Leigh Harline and Lionel Newman).
