= Welcome Strangers =

Studio album by Modern Studies
- Released: 18 May 2018
- Studio: Forteviot Hall; Pumpkinfield
- Genre: Chamber pop; indie folk; indie pop; indie rock
- Length: 40:43
- Label: Fire

Modern Studies chronology
Swell to Great (2016)	Welcome Strangers (2018)	Emergent Slow Arcs (2019)

Singles from Welcome Strangers
- 1. "Mud and Flame" Released: 23 February 2018; 2. "Disco" Released: 11 May 2018

Welcome Strangers is the second studio album by the Scottish chamber pop band Modern Studies, released on 18 May 2018 by Fire Records.

== Critical reception ==
Professional ratings
Aggregate scores
Source	Rating
Metacritic	86/100
Review scores
Source	Rating
AllMusic	4.5/5 stars
The Skinny	4/5 stars

Welcome Strangers was met with universal acclaim reviews from critics. At Metacritic, which assigns a weighted average rating out of 100 to reviews from mainstream publications, this release received an average score of 86, based on 6 reviews.

== Track listing ==
Welcome Strangers track listing
No.	Title	Length
1.	"Get Back Down"	4:21
2.	"Disco"	4:39
3.	"Mud and Flame"	5:16
4.	"Let Idle Hands"	3:12
5.	"It's Winter"	3:31
6.	"Young Sun"	3:31
7.	"Horns and Trumpets"	4:01
8.	"Fast As Flows"	3:23
9.	"The House"	3:57
10.	"Phosphene Dream"	4:52
Total length:		40:43
