= Boyracers =

Novel by Scottish writer Alan Bissett

- 2001 first edition cover
- Author: Alan Bissett
- Language: English
- Genre: Coming-of-age novel
- Publisher: Polygon Books
- Publication date: 2001
- Publication place: Scotland
- Media type: Hardcover, paperback & ebook
- Pages: 190 pages
- ISBN: 978-0-7486-6328-6
- OCLC: 48836057
- Followed by: The Incredible Adam Spark

Boyracers is the debut novel of Scottish writer Alan Bissett. It was first published in 2001 by Edinburgh-based Polygon Books. The plot concerns four male teenagers growing up in the town of Falkirk, exploring the influences of popular culture, global capitalism and social class on the lives of young people in contemporary Scotland.

A tenth anniversary edition was produced in 2011. The same year, Bissett announced that he had finished work on a sequel entitled The Pack Men.

== Summary ==
The narrative centres on 16-year-old Falkirk resident Alvin and his adventures with three slightly older friends. Alvin’s formative development is tracked in the context of the group’s activities, including boy-racing around the town in a car called Belinda and engaging in debates about film and music. He spends much of his time at school attempting to gain the attention of Tyra, his love interest, but is constantly hindered by Connor Livingston, an upper-middle class prefect who mocks Alvin and sneers at his social class, whilst also being interested in Tyra himself. As the most intellectually gifted of the group, Alvin struggles with the dilemma of choosing to continue his generally enjoyable local life or to leave his friends and the town behind and attend university.

== Critical reception ==
The book received a positive reception from critics in Scotland. The Sunday Herald said: "Full of youthful brio, Boyracers has become with the passage of time an unexpectedly bittersweet portrait of the world before 9/11”. The Scotsman noted that, upon publication of Boyracers, that Bissett “was hailed as the voice of a new generation in urban Scots writing”.

The Herald said that the novel was “required reading for those who understand and live its message”. For the Scottish Review of Books, along with some of Bissett’s later works it “dramatised the tragicomic gap between media mirages of the good life and the cold reality we live in”.

== Film adaptation ==
In 2009, The Scotsman reported that the novel was in the process of being adapted into a feature film. On his official website in 2011, Bissett stated that the film had received funding from Scottish Screen and would be produced by Hopscotch Productions. Hopscotch Productions described the film as “a fast and furious coming of age tale set in small town Scotland”, and announced on their website in 2011 that it would be developed in partnership with Scottish Government arts agency Creative Scotland. Bissett has visited some schools in the Falkirk area and read chapters of the book to the students and asked for their opinion. He wrote about Hallglen in the book because not many people write a book about a place like Hallglen.

== Editions ==
- Bissett, Alan (2001), Boyracers (1st hardback ed.), Edinburgh: Polygon Books ISBN 978-0-7486-6328-6
