= Y'all Is Fantasy Island =

Scottish alternative folk band

- Origin: Falkirk, Scotland
- Genres: Alternative rock Alternative folk
- Years active: 2001–2011
- Labels: Panic in Year Zero; Winning Sperm Party; Wise Blood Industries
- Past members: Adam Stafford; Steven Tosh(2007-2011); Jamie Macleod(2007-2011); Jon McCall(2005-2007); Robbie Lesiuk(2006-2007); Tommy Blair(2005-2009)

Y'all Is Fantasy Island are a Scottish alternative folk band from Falkirk, formed in 2001.

== Overview ==
Originally formed in 2001 by singer/songwriter Adam Stafford. After a couple of low-key releases, including 2002's cassette only Wisconsin Death Trip mini album and 2005's Skeletal Demos EP, Stafford recruited guitarist/sound engineer Tommy Blair and drummer/clarinettist Jon McCall. The band recruited bassist/keyboardist Robert Lesiuk in 2006 to help fill out their live sound. McCall and Lesiuk left the band in the summer of 2007 with McCall being replaced by Steven Tosh on drums and Jamie Macleod taking over bass duties.

2008 saw the band release their second album, Rescue Weekend, again to critical acclaim. The album was originally written and conceived as a separate project from the band, but when multi-instrumentalist Tosh joined in 2007, the band decided to issue it under the Y'all is banner on their own DIY Label, Wise Blood Industries.

The band subsequently released "With Handclaps EP" on Glasgow punk label Winning Sperm Party in August 2008, "No Ceremony" in November 2008, and "Infanticidal Genuflector: Selected Film Soundtrack Work 06/07" in December, respectively (again on Winning Sperm Party). This notched the amount of releases in 2008 to four: one EP and three LPs.

The band continued to play live extensively through the year before the unexpected departure of Blair in October 2009. After the departure of Tommy Blair the band played a handful of shows in 2010 including supporting Warpaint before announcing they were to split. Their final show was played at Sneaky Pete's on 11 March 2011 with original member Robbie Lesiuk returning in place of Tommy Blair on guitar.

As of 2026, Adam Stafford continues to work as a solo artist and film maker.

== Members ==
- Adam Stafford (2001-2011)
- Tommy Blair (2005-2009)
- Jon McCall (2005-2007)
- Robbie Lesiuk (2006-2007)
- Jamie Macleod (2007-2011)
- Steven Tosh (2007-2011)

== In Faceless Towns Forever ==
The trio of Stafford, Blair and McCall recorded the debut album In Faceless Towns Forever during a 19-hour session in an abandoned house in their hometown. The album was released in 2006 on Falkirk-based indie label Panic in Year Zero and distributed by Cargo Records.

The LP received much acclaim from the Scottish Music Press, drawing comparisons to Leonard Cohen, Ry Cooder, and fellow Falkirk musicians Arab Strap.

== Rescue Weekend ==
The outfit's second album was written in autumn/winter 2006 and recorded during three days in February 2007 in Homegrown Studios, a converted farmhouse studio in rural Falkirk. The LP was originally conceived as a solo album for Stafford. He and Tosh added guitarist/bassist pianist Robert Lesiuk, pedal steel guitarist Alister Bruce and saxophonist Bruce Mechie. Kim Moore from Glasgow band Zoey Van Goey provided viola and vocals on the track "High Hopes, Lost Love & Ruined Lives". Rescue Weekend was a lyrical departure for Stafford and saw him assuming the position of imaginary characters with each song following a narrative. The LP received a 4* review from The Skinny' and was acclaimed by magazines Plan B and The List. It was issued on the band's own DIY label Wise Blood in May 2008.

== No Ceremony ==
Recorded on and off over two years, No Ceremony was issued in November 2008. The album contained perhaps the band's two most famous songs, "With Handclaps" (which was championed by Tom Robinson on BBC Radio 6) and Punk Rock Disco. Primarily recorded in Tosh's living room and Adam Stafford's parents' living room and bathroom, the album was issued to 4 and 5-star reviews in November 2008.

== Infanticidal Genuflector ==
The band's third album of 2008 was a compendium of instrumental film soundtrack music commissioned for Edinburgh filmmaker Leo Bruges' street documentary Fistfull of Roses, and also featured the track "Hammer Eats Hoover", which was used in Adam Stafford's own film collaboration with author Alan Bissett, entitled The Shutdown.

== Super Puny Humans ==
In May 2007, YIFI embarked upon a short tour with Glasgow band Zoey Van Goey and Scottish writer Alan Bissett. Dubbed the Super Puny Humans, and inspired by Ballad of the Books project, the shows featured performances by both bands and sections with everyone on stage. Bissett would read from his published novels while both bands provided musical backing.

== Discography ==
- In Faceless Towns Forever, LP 2006
- With Handclaps, EP 2008
- Rescue Weekend, LP 2008
- No Ceremony, LP 2008
- Infanticidal Genuflector, LP 2008
- Tracks We Laid Will Die: Demos & Rarities '01 - '07, LP 2011
