= New Gods (album) =

Studio album by Withered Hand
- Released: 10 March 2014
- Recorded: Castle of Doom Studios
- Genre: Indie rock, folk rock
- Length: 44:16
- Label: Fortuna Pop!, Slumberland Records
- Producer: Tony Doogan

Withered Hand chronology
| Good News (2011) | New Gods (2014) | How to Love (2023) |

Singles from New Gods
- 1. "Horseshoe" Released: 10 February 2014

New Gods is the second album by indie rock musician Withered Hand, released on 10 March 2014. It features appearances from Pam Berry of Black Tambourine, as well as Eugene Kelly, Scott Hutchison and members of Belle and Sebastian and King Creosote. It was funded in part by Creative Scotland.

In 2022, a remastered version of the album was released digitally on Reveal Records, with two bonus demo tracks. It replaced the original version on Bandcamp.

== Reception ==
On the website Metacritic, which aggregates scores from reviews by well-known critics, the album has a score of 71%, indicating generally favourable reviews. The Quietus' Nicola Meighan described it as "wise, but never preaching" and wrote that while Withered Hand's debut album Good News discussed mainly Christianity-related topics, New Gods focuses more on "more fiery celestial deities – namely the sun and the stars in the sky".

Professional ratings
Aggregate scores
| Source | Rating |
|---|---|
| Metacritic | (71/100) |
Review scores
| Source | Rating |
| Allmusic | 3.5/5 stars |
| Cuepoint (Expert Witness) | A |
| Drowned in Sound | 8/10 |
| Exclaim! | 8/10 |
| Filter | 83% |
| God is in the TV | 5/5 stars |
| The List | 2/5 stars |
| NME | 3.5/5 stars |
| The Quietus | (positive) |
| Sputnikmusic | 3.5/5 stars |

=== Accolades ===
New Gods was nominated for the Association of Independent Music's "Best Difficult Second Album" Award, but lost to Ben Watt's album Hendra. Robert Christgau named it the third best album of 2014 in his year-end list for The Barnes & Noble Review.

== Track listing ==
1. Horseshoe
2. Black Tambourine
3. Love Over Desire
4. King of Hollywood
5. California
6. Fall Apart
7. Between True Love and Ruin
8. Life of Doubt
9. New Gods
10. Heart Heart
11. Not Alone
12. Horseshoe Demo (2022 Remaster)
13. California Demo (2022 Remaster)
