= Daniel Boone discography =

English pop musician discography

- Studio albums: 5
- Compilation albums: 5
- Singles: 45

This article is the discography of English pop musician Daniel Boone. It includes his releases as Peter Lee Stirling, but excludes his work with bands such as Hungry Wolf and Rumplestiltskin and his work with David Garrick as The Warlord, The Intergalactic Orchestra and Technique. For his work with Tommy Bruce and the Bruisers, see there.

== Albums ==
=== Studio albums ===
| Year | Title | Details | Peak chart positions |
| Year | Title | Details | US |
|---|---|---|---|
| 1972 | Daddy Don't You Walk So Fast | Released: 1972; Label: Contour | — |
| 1972 | Beautiful Sunday | Released: October 1972; Label: Mercury; Released in some countries as Daniel Boone | 142 |
| 1973 | Export Only | Released: 1973; Label: Penny Farthing | — |
| 1975 | Run Tell the People | Released: 1975; Label: Penny Farthing | — |
| 1985 | I'm Only Looking | Released: 1985; Label: PVK | — |
"—" denotes releases that did not chart or were not released in that territory.

=== Compilation albums ===
| Year | Title | Details | Peak chart positions |
| Year | Title | Details | JPN |
|---|---|---|---|
| 1976 | Beautiful Sunday | Released: April 1976; Label: Discomate; Japan-only release | 16 |
| 1976 | Skydiver | Released: September 1976; Label: Discomate; Japan-only release | — |
| 1995 | Beautiful Sunday – Greatest Hits | Released: 1995; Label: LaserLight Digital; Germany-only release | — |
| 1996 | The Very Best of Daniel Boone | Released: June 1996; Label: Music Club | — |
| 1999 | Beautiful Sunday | Released: February 1999; Label: Repertoire; Germany-only release | — |
"—" denotes releases that did not chart or were not released in that territory.

== Singles ==
| Year | Title (Note: Unless stated otherwise, the B-side is by the same artist as the A-side.) | Peak chart positions | | | | | | | | | | |
| Year | Title | UK | AUS | BE (FLA) | BE (WA) | CAN | GER | NZ | SA | SWE | US | ZIM |
|---|---|---|---|---|---|---|---|---|---|---|---|---|
| 1963 | "My Heart Commands Me" (as Lee Stirling) b/w "Welcome Stranger" | — | — | — | — | — | — | — | — | — | — | — |
| 1963 | "Blue Girl" (as the Bruisers) b/w "Don't Cry" | 31 | — | — | — | — | — | — | — | — | — | — |
| 1963 | "I Could If I Wanted To" (as Lee Stirling with the Bruisers) b/w "Right from the Start" | — | — | — | — | — | — | — | — | — | — | — |
| 1963 | "Your Turn to Cry" (as the Bruisers) b/w "Give It to Me" | — | — | — | — | — | — | — | — | — | — | — |
| 1964 | "I Believe" (as Lee Stirling and the Bruisers) b/w "Now That I've Found You" | — | — | — | — | — | — | — | — | — | — | — |
| 1964 | "Sad, Lonely and Blue" (as Peter Lee Stirling and the Bruisers) b/w "Looking for Someone to Love" | — | — | — | — | — | — | — | — | — | — | — |
| 1964 | "Everything Will Be Alright" (as Peter Lee Stirling and the Bruisers) b/w "You'll Be Mine" | — | — | — | — | — | — | — | — | — | — | — |
| 1966 | "And I'm Crying Again" (with Don Charles; credited as Don & Pete) b/w "Time Will Tell" | — | — | — | — | — | — | — | — | — | — | — |
| 1966 | "The Sweet and Tender Hold of Your Love" (as Peter Lee Stirling) b/w "Everybody Needs a Someone" | — | — | — | — | — | — | — | — | — | — | — |
| 1966 | "Oh What a Fool" (as Peter Lee Stirling) b/w "I'm Sporting a New Baby" | — | — | — | — | — | — | — | — | — | — | — |
| 1967 | "You Don't Live Twice" (as Peter Lee Stirling) b/w "8.35 on the Dot" | — | — | — | — | — | — | — | — | — | — | — |
| 1967 | "Goodbye Thimblemill Lane" (as Peter Lee Stirling) b/w "Hey Conductor" | — | — | — | — | — | — | — | — | — | — | — |
| 1968 | "Rain, Rain, Rain" (as Threshold of Pleasure) b/w "He Could Never Love You Like I Do" | — | — | — | — | — | — | — | — | — | — | — |
| 1969 | "Big Sam" (as Peter Lee Stirling) b/w "Mr. Average Man" | — | — | — | — | — | — | — | — | — | — | — |
| 1970 | "Goodbye Summer Girl" (as Peter Lee Stirling) b/w "Judas in Blue" | — | — | — | — | — | — | — | — | — | — | — |
| 1971 | "Daddy Don't You Walk So Fast" b/w "Tiger Woman" | 17 | — | — | — | — | — | 1 | 7 | — | — | 7 |
| 1971 | "Billy's Gotta Run" (as the Doggs) b/w "Why Do I Lie?" | — | — | — | — | — | — | — | — | — | — | — |
| 1971 | "Mamma (Did You Really Think We'd Leave You All Alone)" b/w "Hey Girl" | — | — | — | — | — | — | — | — | — | — | — |
| 1972 | "Beautiful Sunday" b/w "Truly Julie" | 21 | 8 | 4 | 8 | 4 | 1 | 1 | 1 | 2 | 15 | 1 |
| 1972 | "Annabelle" b/w "Who Turned the Light Out on my Life" (UK); "Sleepyhead" (US) | — | 73 | — | 49 | 76 | 16 | 8 | 16 | — | 86 | 7 |
| 1972 | "Sunshine Lover" (Note: "Sunshine Lover" was first released in South Africa in 1972 with the B-side "Who Turned the Light Out on my Life". It was then released in North America in 1973 with the B-side "Crying", then in the UK and Europe with "In Ohio" and then in Australasia with "Sleepy Head".) b/w "In Ohio" (UK); "Crying" (US) | — | 85 | 30 | — | — | 36 | 6 | 4 | 12 | — (Note: "Sunshine Lover" did not enter the Billboard Hot 100, but did peak at number 131 on the Record World chart.) | 4 |
| 1972 | "Love Again, Live Again" (New Zealand-only release) b/w "Funny Little Things" | — | — | — | — | — | — | 6 | — | — | — | — |
| 1973 | "Rock and Roll Burn" b/w "Sunday Morning Coming" | — | 60 | — | — | — | — | — | — | — | — | — |
| 1973 | "Sunshine Lady" (Germany-only release) b/w "Schönes junges Mädchen" | — | — | — | — | — | — | — | — | — | — | — |
| 1973 | "Over and Over Again" (South Africa and Zimbabwe-only release) b/w "Sleepy Head" | — | — | — | — | — | — | — | — | — | — | 10 |
| 1973 | "Skydiver" b/w "Carrie Lee" (UK); "Do You Think the Lord?" (US) | — | 16 | — | — | — | 30 | 8 | — | — | — | 16 |
| 1974 | "Love Spell" b/w "Lelly I Love You" | — | — | — | — | — | — | — | — | — | — | — |
| 1974 | "Annie the Dancer" (as Dan's Band) b/w "Lelly I Love You" | — | — | — | — | — | — | — | — | — | — | — |
| 1974 | "Sunshine City" b/w "Chloe" | — | — | — | — | — | — | 12 | — | — | — | — |
| 1974 | "Seeing You Again" (Australia and New Zealand-only release) b/w " Chloe" | — | — | — | — | — | — | — | — | — | — | — |
| 1975 | "Run Tell the People" b/w "Magic Woman" (UK); "Rock and Roll Burn" (US) | — | — | — | — | — | — | — | — | — | 93 | — |
| 1975 | "I Think of You" b/w "Singing Backing Vocal with a Rock 'n' Roll Band" | — | — | — | — | — | — | — | — | — | — | — |
| 1975 | "Running Around with the Boys Again" (Germany and New Zealand-only release) b/w "Singing Backing Vocal with a Rock 'n' Roll Band" (Germany); "Magic Woman" (New Zealand) | — | — | — | — | — | — | — | — | — | — | — |
| 1976 | "Overland Gambling Train" (as Daniel Boone's Boogie Band) b/w "Connections in the City" | — | — | — | — | — | — | — | — | — | — | — |
| 1976 | "At the Third Stroke" b/w "Remember" | — | — | — | — | — | — | — | — | — | — | — |
| 1976 | "Remember" (Germany-only release) b/w "Witchypoo" | — | — | — | — | — | — | — | — | — | — | — |
| 1977 | "Bewitched" b/w "Knock Knock Knock" | — | — | — | — | — | — | — | — | — | — | — |
| 1978 | "I'm Glad I Found I Don't Need You" b/w "Made in Hollywood" | — | — | — | — | — | — | — | — | — | — | — |
| 1978 | "Round and Round" b/w "Something in a Song" | — | — | — | — | — | — | — | — | — | — | — |
| 1980 | "I've Really Got You" (with Lelly Boone) b/w "Do You Believe in Me" | — | — | — | — | — | — | — | — | — | — | — |
| 1980 | "Earthquake, Landslide, Hurricane" (as Lee Stirling) b/w "Soul Music" | — | — | — | — | — | — | — | — | — | — | — |
| 1981 | "Street Fighters" b/w "Trouble in the Family" | — | — | — | — | — | — | — | — | — | — | — |
| 1982 | "Wyvern" (with Muff Murfin; credited as Boone & Murfin) b/w "Wyvern" (instrumental) | — | — | — | — | — | — | — | — | — | — | — |
| 1983 | "I'm Only Looking" b/w "Sweet Conversation" | — | — | — | — | — | — | — | — | — | — | — |
| 1983 | "Total Reaction" b/w "Sanctuary" | — | — | — | — | — | — | — | — | — | — | — |
"—" denotes releases that did not chart or were not released in that territory.
