= Zoey Van Goey =

Scottish indie pop band

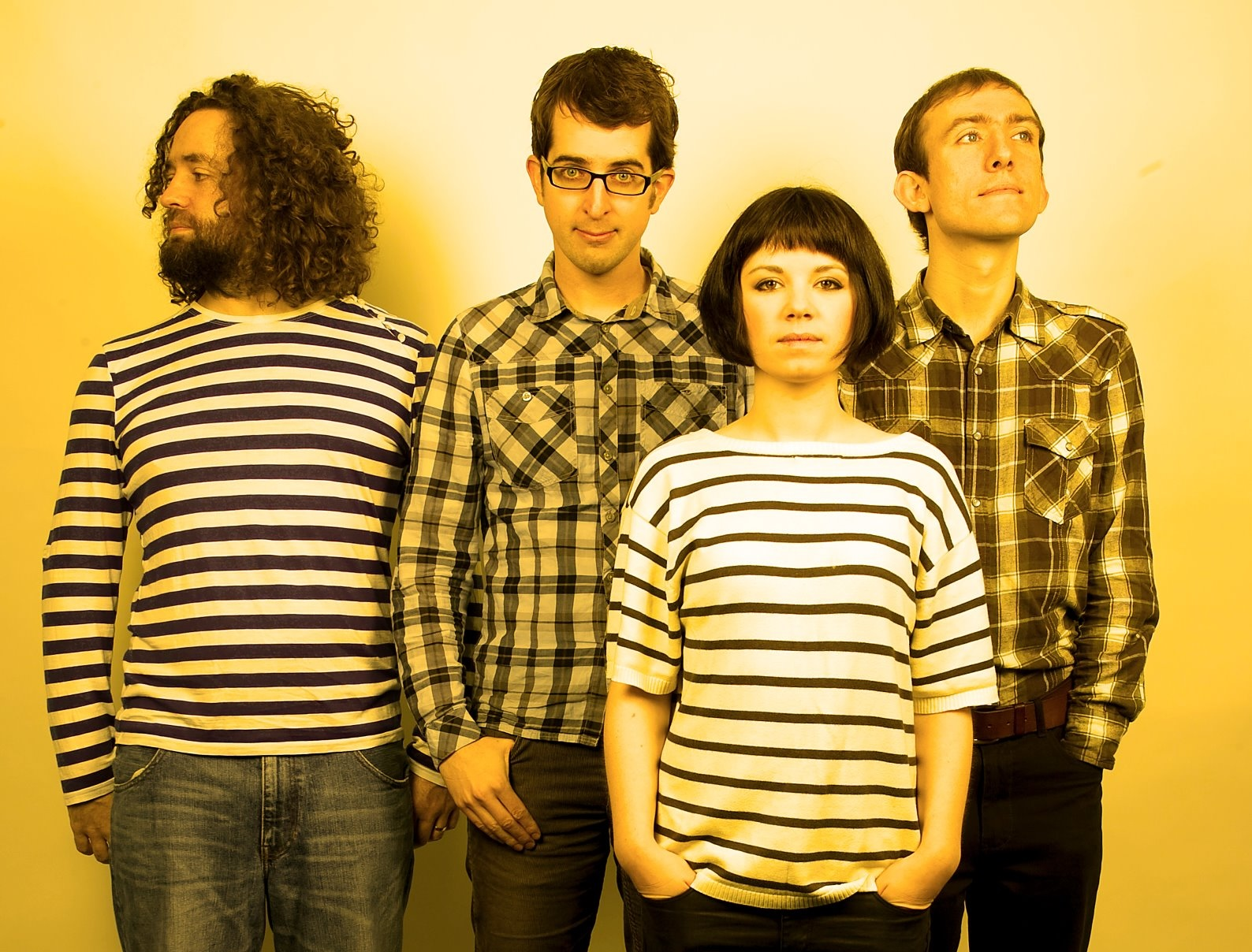

Background information
- Origin: Glasgow, Scotland
- Genres: Indie folk, indie pop
- Years active: 2006–2012
- Label: Chemikal Underground Records
- Members: Kim Moore; Matt Brennan; Michael John McCarthy; Adam Scott
- Website: https://chemikal.co.uk/artists/zoey-van-goey/

Zoey Van Goey were an indie pop band from Glasgow, Scotland, made up of Matt Brennan, Michael John McCarthy, Kim Moore and Adam Scott.

Brennan, McCarthy and Moore, hailing from Canada, Ireland and England respectively, formed the initial trio in Glasgow in 2006, with Scott becoming a full-fledged member in 2010. The band stopped performing in 2012.

The band's debut single, "Foxtrot Vandals," was produced by Belle and Sebastian frontman Stuart Murdoch, and released on seven-inch vinyl in 2007. Their second single, "Sweethearts in Disguise," was produced by Paul Savage of The Delgados and released in 2008.

Their debut album, The Cage Was Unlocked All Along, was initially self-released on 1000 CD copies in 2009 and quickly sold out; it was then re-released by Chemikal Underground Records. Their second album, Propeller Versus Wings, was released on Chemikal Underground in 2011.

== Press coverage ==
Zoey Van Goey were generally favourably received into the Scottish music scene, described by The List as an "eclectic and endlessly imaginative Glasgow-based Canadian, Irish and English boy-girl trio [with] frothy indie-pop tendencies."

Their debut album was described by the NME as "charming folk-pop" and by The Skinny as "intelligent, humorous, pleasant twee-pop ... an excellent album that could ably soundtrack any (admittedly rare) sunny day in Glasgow."

Their sophomore effort was also generally well received, with Allmusic.com describing it as an "eminently likable second album [whose] myriad modes hang together to present a coherent sensibility, the varied but complementary sides of the same sparkling personality: goofy at times, definitely a little geeky, but also sweet, sensitive, thoughtful, and often boldly romantic."

== Tours and gigs ==
Zoey Van Goey's first tour was in May 2007, when Scottish novelist Alan Bissett approached the Zoeys and Y'all is Fantasy Island suggesting the three artists go on tour together. The gigs combined spoken word readings by Bissett with music by the two bands performing simultaneously onstage. The collective, dubbed as The Super Puny Humans, toured across central Scotland.

After building interest from their two single releases, in 2008 Zoey Van Goey were invited to play the majority of unsigned stages of Scotland's biggest music festivals, including T in the Park, Connect Music Festival, Wickerman Festival, Live at Loch Lomond and Rock Ness.

Zoey Van Goey collaborated with the National Theatre of Scotland in 2009, devising the music and performing onstage for the stage adaptation of the Takeshi Kitano film Dolls.

The band continued to tour throughout the UK and Europe during their active years. Throughout their career, Zoey Van Goey were championed by Belle and Sebastian, who invited the band to perform at their 2010 'Bowlie Weekender' All Tomorrow's Parties Festival. When Zoey Van Goey launched their second album in 2011, they supported Belle and Sebastian on their European tour.

== Discography ==
=== Singles & EPs ===
- "Foxtrot Vandals" (w/ b-side "Song To The Embers" remix by Miaoux Miaoux - Say Dirty Records, 2007)
- "Sweethearts In Disguise" (w/ b-side "Lick A 99" remix by Funkspiel - Lucky Number Nine Records, 2008)

=== Albums ===
- The Cage Was Unlocked All Along (Chemikal Underground Records, 2009)
1. "The Best Treasure Stays Buried"
2. "We Don't Have That Kind Of Bread"
3. "Sweethearts In Disguise"
4. "We All Hid In Basements"
5. "Two White Ghosts"
6. "Foxtrot Vandals"
7. "My Persecution Complex"
8. "Nae Wonder"
9. "Cotton Covering"
10. "City Is Exploding"
- Propeller Versus Wings (Chemikal Underground Records, 2011)
1. "Mountain On Fire"
2. "The Cake And Eating It"
3. "Sackville Sun"
4. "My Aviator"
5. "Escape Maps"
6. "You Told The Drunks I Knew Karate"
7. "Little Islands"
8. "Extremities"
9. "Robot Tyrannosaur"
10. "Another Day Another Disaster"
11. "Where It Lands"

=== Contributions ===
- "Xmas in New York" Avalanche Records Alternative Christmas 2009

=== Other recordings ===
- "Song To The Embers"
- "Tell Me Lies"
- "Jump Your Bones"
