= Withered Hand =

Scottish indie rock musician

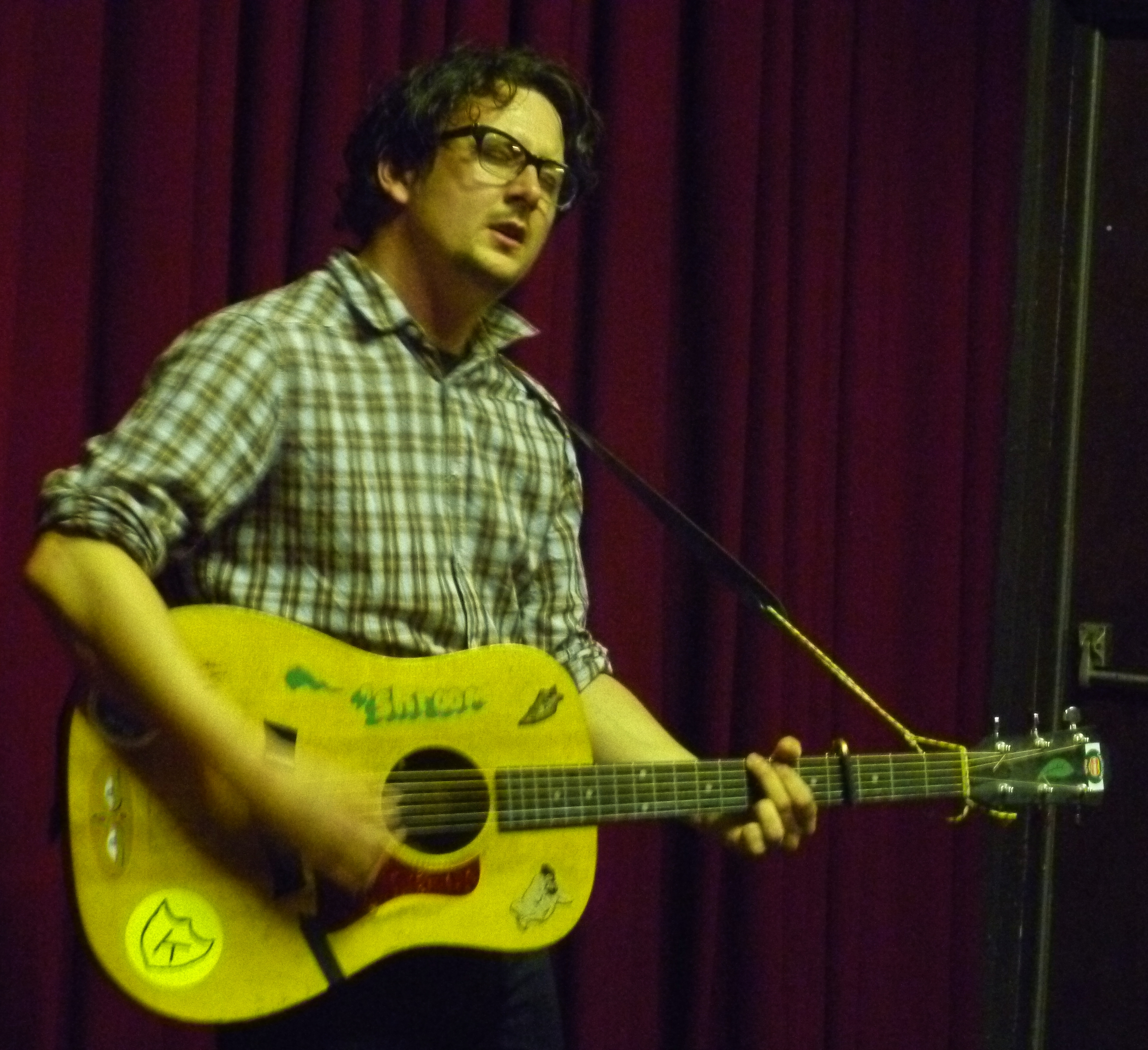
- Withered Hand performing at the Lexington in London on 25 September 2011

Background information
- Born: Dan Willson; 23 July 1974 (age 51); London
- Genres: Indie rock, folk rock, anti-folk
- Instruments: Vocals, guitar, harmonica
- Years active: 2005–present
- Labels: Absolutely Kosher Records, Slumberland Records, Fortuna Pop!, Reveal Records
- Website: witheredhand.com

Dan Willson (born 23 July 1974), also known by his stage name Withered Hand, is an Edinburgh-based indie rock musician.

His first studio album, Good News, was released in 2009 in Scotland, and re-released in 2011 on Absolutely Kosher Records in the United States. His second album, titled New Gods, was released in March 2014 through Fortuna Pop Records in the UK and Slumberland Records in the USA. He performed at the South by Southwest festival in Austin, Texas in 2011 and 2014 as part of the Scottish Showcase. His third solo album, How To Love, was released in 2023.

== Early life ==
Willson was raised as a Jehovah's Witness in Scotland and in Bishop's Stortford in England, where he played guitar for local band Tin Foil Circus. As a child, he was not permitted to attend school assemblies, birthday parties or Christmas celebrations. Willson was worried throughout his childhood that his voice was too high so he didn't begin singing until his late twenties, and he originally wanted to be a visual artist. He has been based in Edinburgh since 1996.

== Musical career ==
Willson studied at Art College in London and moved to Edinburgh with his then-girlfriend, now-wife, in 1996. Shortly thereafter, he tried his hand at being a visual artist, but eventually abandoned his work in the field. He attributed this in part to his "lack of success in expressing myself visually". He was guitarist in Edinburgh band Barrichello, which he joined in 1999. This band broke up amicably in 2002. His second band was known as Squits, and later became a short-lived art rock group named Peanut. He was also a member of the short-lived anti-folk group The Love Gestures alongside Cammy Watt of Enfant Bastard and Neil Pennycook of Meursault.

Willson began his solo musical career at age 30, after a close friend died and Willson's wife bought him a guitar for his 30th birthday.

Willson has said that his upbringing as a Jehovah's Witness "gave [his] fledgling artistic temperament a lot to think about", and that since he was taught that the world would end very soon, he began to "read everything as a sign". The first song he ever wrote as Withered Hand was "Cornflake". He has cited Teenage Fanclub and Eugenius as two of the bands he listened to most often growing up, and as the reason why he was so glad that the Eugenius frontman Eugene Kelly appeared on New Gods. Willson, in fact, named his son after Kelly.

Withered Hand was an active member of the Fence Collective and its offshoot the Alter Ego Trading Company, making appearances at their Fife based events The World Tour of Crail and Bunfight at the OK Karail. He has toured with the likes of James Yorkston, Frightened Rabbit (as well as Scott Hutchison), Rozi Plain, King Creosote and Samantha Crain.

Willson provided backing vocals on Hamish Hawk's 2021 album Heavy Elevator, and appears in the video for the single "The Mauritian Badminton Doubles Champion, 1973".

Willson's most recent band consists of, in addition to him, Malcolm Benzie of Edinburgh band eagleowl (guitar & mandolin), Fraser Hughes (bass) and Alun Thomas of The Leg (drums). They are also occasionally joined by Pam Berry of 90s US band Black Tambourine and various former members of the Second Hand Marching Band. Previous members include Hannah Shepherd (cello) and Neil Pennycook of Meursault (banjo).

In February 2023 Willson released "Waking Up", a single and music video from his first new album in nine years, How to Love. The album was released in April on Reveal Records, supported by a full-band UK tour.

In January 2024 it was announced that Willson and Kathryn Williams will release a collaborative album in April on the One Little Independent label. The album was recorded and produced by Rod Jones and features contributions from fellow musicians including King Creosote, Kris Drever, Chris Geddes and Louis Abbott. The first single, "Shelf", was released with a video made by Marry Waterson.

== Reception ==
Marc Riley has named Withered Hand as one of his favourite artists, and has had him perform sessions on his show, BBC Radio 6 Music. Robert Christgau has also written favourable reviews of both his albums, naming Good News the 14th best album of 2011 and New Gods the third best album of 2014.

== Discography ==
=== Albums ===
- Good News (2009)
- New Gods (2014)
- How To Love (2023)
- Willson Williams, collaboration with Kathryn Williams (2024)

=== EPs ===
- Religious Songs (2008)
- You're Not Alone (2009)
- Heart Heart (2012)
- Inbetweens (2012)
- Among Horses I (2017)
- Ten Years (2019, reworkings of tracks from Good News for its tenth anniversary)
- My Days (2023, digital-only release of extra tracks recorded during the How To Love album sessions)

=== Live ===
- Could Ya Do The Woo Woos? (2020, recording of a 2017 Newcastle gig)

=== Singles ===
- "King of Hollywood" (2013, split single with "Next to Nothing Blues" by Charles Latham)
- "Horseshoe" (2014, gold vinyl limited to 500)
