= Meursault (band) =

Scottish indie rock band

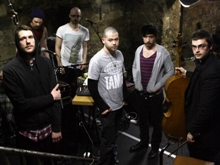
- Meursault

Background information
- Origin: Edinburgh, Scotland
- Genre: Lo-fi
- Years active: 2006–2014, 2016–present
- Labels: Bear Scotland (2007); Song, by Toad Records (2008–2017); Bandcamp (2018); Common Ground Records (2019–present)
- Members: Neil Pennycook; Robyn Dawson; Reuben Taylor; Calum Macleod
- Website: iammeursault.com

Meursault are a Scottish indie rock band from Edinburgh, formed in 2006. Led by singer-songwriter Neil Pennycook, the band's musical style has been categorised as folktronica, alternative rock and indie folk. The band themselves have described their latest work as "epic lo-fi". The name of the band is a reference to the main character of L'Etranger, the absurdist novel by Albert Camus.

Their releases to date have been generally well received by the music and entertainment media, both in Scotland and on a nationwide level. In 2009 The Skinny placed the band's debut album, Pissing On Bonfires / Kissing With Tongues, at No. 16 in their "Scottish Albums of the Decade" list; while their second full-length release, All Creatures Will Make Merry, has been reviewed favourably by several notable media outlets, among them The BBC, Pitchfork, Bearded, Clash, The List and The Skinny.

During 2009 and 2010, the band were included in regular rotation on local and national BBC radio stations, and playlisted by a number of BBC presenters including Gideon Coe, Marc Riley, Vic Galloway and Nemone. They made appearances in many music festivals, including RockNess, T in the Park, Truck, End of the Road and Glastonbury. In May 2013, Meursault's third studio album, Something for the Weakened, was shortlisted for the Scottish Album of the Year (SAY) award. In 2017, they were once again recognised as the album 'I Will Kill Again' was longlisted for that award.

The band's latest full album, Crow Hill, was released in mid 2019.

== History ==
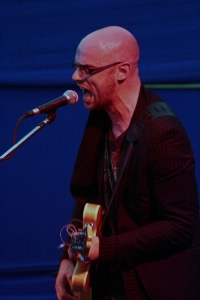
Neil Pennycook of Meursault performing at Knockengorroch 2010

Meursault were formed when singer-songwriter Neil Pennycook began performing with friends from his hometown of Penicuik, on the outskirts of Edinburgh in Scotland. Pennycook noted, "I was into basketball, and only into basketball, until I was 21. I was as passionate about that as I am about music now. But I hurt my knee and had to take six months off, so I started playing guitar. And that was that."

In 2006, a then 3-piece Meursault released an EP, Making the Most of the Raw Materials of Futility, via Glasgow indie label Struck Dum Records.

The band self-released their debut album, Pissing On Bonfires / Kissing With Tongues, in 2008, before a second run was released on the Edinburgh-based independent label, Song, by Toad Records, in 2009.

In 2009, Phillip Quirie and Pete Harvey joined the band, with Pennycook stating that "the highlight [of the year] would have to be Phil and Pete joining the band. I've followed both of them, in their various projects, for what feels like years, and can't believe how lucky I am to have the chance to work them both". In 2012, Pennycook elaborated, "I was a huge fan of Pete through Khaya, and Desc, and The Leg, and then he came in to do the Cold Seeds album. I told him I really liked his stuff, and he said the same, and he actually asked to join the band. I was quite flattered by that. I got to record with King Creosote that day too – I'd been buying his records since I was at college. That was a good day".

In late 2009, Neil Pennycook and Peter Harvey contributed to the Cold Seeds collaborative album along with Frances Donnelly (Animal Magic Tricks) and Kenny Anderson (King Creosote). Anderson, Donnelly and Pennycook all wrote songs for the project, which all four performers then recorded together.

The band have played numerous concerts in Edinburgh and Glasgow, and in 2009 embarked on their first nationwide tours. In early 2010, the band announced that their first European tour would take place during April and May of that year.

The band's second album, All Creatures Will Make Merry was released on Song, by Toad Records as a limited edition handmade CD available to guests at launch events in Glasgow and Edinburgh in early April 2010, prior to a full national release on 24 May 2010.

In 2012, the band released their third studio album, Something for the Weakened. It was nominated for the 2013 Scottish Album of the Year (SAY) award.

In 2014 the band released a mini-album titled The Organ Grinder's Monkey, which was compiled using a Kickstarter campaign to fund the band's appearance at SXSW in Austin, Texas.

In July 2014 after Meursault's south by southwest tour (SXSW), it was announced that they would be officially disbanding. A number of things contributed, but two of the main reasons were that band members had personal family priorities and also because Pennycook wanted to perform as a solo artist. Later that year he released the first Supermoon EP (Supermoon vs Black Friday).

Pennycook continued as Supermoon until July 2016, where he then reactivated all of his Meursault accounts and posted "Hi". Pennycook realised while working as Supermoon that a lot of the themes and music that he was producing was what he'd been doing as Meursault - he had always written and arranged his own music.

The major difference in the new Meursault to the previous version of Meursault is that it is now essentially a solo project with a rotating cast of people that perform with Pennycook. A Meursault show alternates between a six piece, or just Pennycook himself. The current lineup is Neil Pennycook, Robyn Dawson, Reuben Taylor, Calum Macleod, Fraser Calder and Jayson Turner.

In 2016 Meursault released the Simple is Good EP, and in 2017 released the album I Will Kill Again. In 2017, the album was shortlisted to the Top 10 in the Scottish Album of the Year Awards, as was his previous 2013 album Something for the Weakened.

In 2018 Meursault released a digital album Fuck Off Back to Art School & Other Stories, which was part of a year long album campaign.

The new album (which was prefaced by Fuck Off Back to Art School & Other Stories), will be called Crow Hill. First making its live debut as part of the Made in Scotland event during the Edinburgh Festival Fringe, it is now slated for release in early 2019.

Crow Hill was recorded in Chamber Studio, and co-produced by the owner of the studio - Graeme Young. The album was mastered by Mandy Parnell (who has worked with Radiohead, Bjork, The XX), and the artwork is produced by Pablo Clark. The album was released through Common Grounds Records, a new label established by Graeme Young. This was the first full length physical album not released by Song, by Toad Records.

In September 2018, Meursault released the digital album Archive - a collection of demos & sketches drawn from the first 10 years of Meursault's existence.

During 2020, Pennycook released three solo EPs under his own name (Neil Scott Pennycook), titled "Meursault Vol. 1", "Meursault Vol. 2" and "Meursault Vol. 3". They were available for a limited time via the band's Bandcamp page and are still available on streaming services.

In 2022, Pennycook announced on Twitter that a new album had been recorded with a full band on The Isle of Skye.

== Band members ==
- Neil Pennycook (2006–present)
- Calum Macleod (2008–2014; 2016–present)
- Fraser Calder (2006–2011; 2016–2019)
- Robyn Dawson (2016–present)
- Faith Eliott (2015-2017)
- Reuben Taylor (2016–present)
- Jayson Turner (2016–present)
- Pete Harvey (2009–2014)
- Rob St. John (2011–2014)
- Kate Miguda (2011–2014)
- Sam Mallalieu (2011–2014)
- Lorcan Doherty (2011–2014)
- Ben Fletcher (2012–2014)
- Philip Quirie (2009–2011)
- Chris Bryant (2006–2011)
- Gavin Tarling (2008–2011)

== Discography ==
=== Albums ===
- Pissing On Bonfires / Kissing With Tongues (2008)
- All Creatures Will Make Merry (2010)
- Something for the Weakened (2012)
- The Organ Grinder's Monkey (Mini-album, 2014)
- I Will Kill Again (February 2017)
- Fuck Off Back To Art School & Other Stories (Digital Release 2018)
- Archive (Digital Release 2018)
- Crow Hill (2019)
- Meursault (2023)
- Onward Through the Fog (2026)

=== EPs ===
- Making the Most of the Raw Materials of Futility (2006)
- Nothing Broke (2009)
- Simple Is Good (2016)
- Meursault Vol. 1, 2, 3 (2020) - under the name Neil Scott Pennycook

=== Singles ===
- "William Henry Miller Pt.1" / "The Dirt & The Roots" (2009)
- "William Henry Miller Pt.2" / "A Few Kind Words" (2009)
- "Flittin'" (2012)
- "Dull Spark" (2012)
- "Laugh Track" (2023)

=== Contributions ===
- Christmas in Kirkcaldy (cover of Phil Ochs' No Christmas in Kentucky) - Avalanche Records Alternative Christmas (2009); No Christmas in Kentucky by Meursault appeared on Shelter Scotland's 2016 charity Christmas album
