= Song, by Toad Records =

- Founded: 2008
- Founder: Matthew Young
- Genre: Indie, Folk
- Country of origin: Scotland
- Location: Edinburgh, Scotland
- Official website: http://www.songbytoad.com, http://www.songbytoadrecords.com

Song, by Toad is an independent record label and music blog based in Edinburgh, Scotland. It was founded in 2008 by Matthew Young, and has released several critically acclaimed albums by acts including Meursault, Rob St John and Sparrow and the Workshop. The label takes its name from a passage in The Wind in the Willows.

== History ==
Song, by Toad, began in 2004 as a music blog by Matthew Young, a design engineer in Edinburgh. The label was founded in 2008 after a drunken discussion with the band Broken Records, whereby Young promised to release the band's first album if they weren't signed by another record label. Although Broken Records eventually signed to 4AD, Young decided to found the label anyway.

Following low-key releases by Uhersky Brod and Nightjar, the label's first major release was Pissing on Bonfires/Kissing with Tongues by the Edinburgh-based Meursault in 2009, the success of which Young credits with forcing him 'to set up a proper record label'. The album was rated by cultural magazine The Skinny as the 16th best Scottish album of the 2000-2010 decade.

== Toad Sessions ==
Alongside the record label and the blog, Song, by Toad has also recorded and published a number of live 'Toad Sessions', mostly recorded in Matthew Young's home. The Toad sessions have featured international artists including Mumford & Sons, Josh T. Pearson, Sam Amidon and Lach, as well as artists from the label including Meursault, Adam Stafford and Rob St John.

== Artists ==
These artists have all released music on the Song, by Toad label.

- Animal Magic Tricks
- Bastard Mountain
- Dana Gavanski
- David Thomas Broughton
- Dolfinz
- DTHPDL
- Dune Witch Trails
- eagleowl
- Ian Humberstone
- Inspector Tapehead
- Jesus H Foxx
- Jonnie Common
- King Creosote
- King Post Kitsch
- Le Thug
- Lil Daggers
- Loch Lomond
- Magic Eye
- Maxwell Panther
- Meursault
- NAKED
- Nightjar
- PAWS
- Plastic Animals
- Rob St John
- Sex Hands
- Siobhan Wilson
- Sparrow and the Workshop
- The Builders and the Butchers
- The Japanese War Effort
- The Leg
- The Savings and Loan
- The Underground Youth
- Trips and Falls
- Uhersky Brod
- Virgin of the Birds
- Waiters
- Woodpigeon
- Yusuf Azak
- Zed Penguin
