= Derek A. Paley =

American aerospace engineer

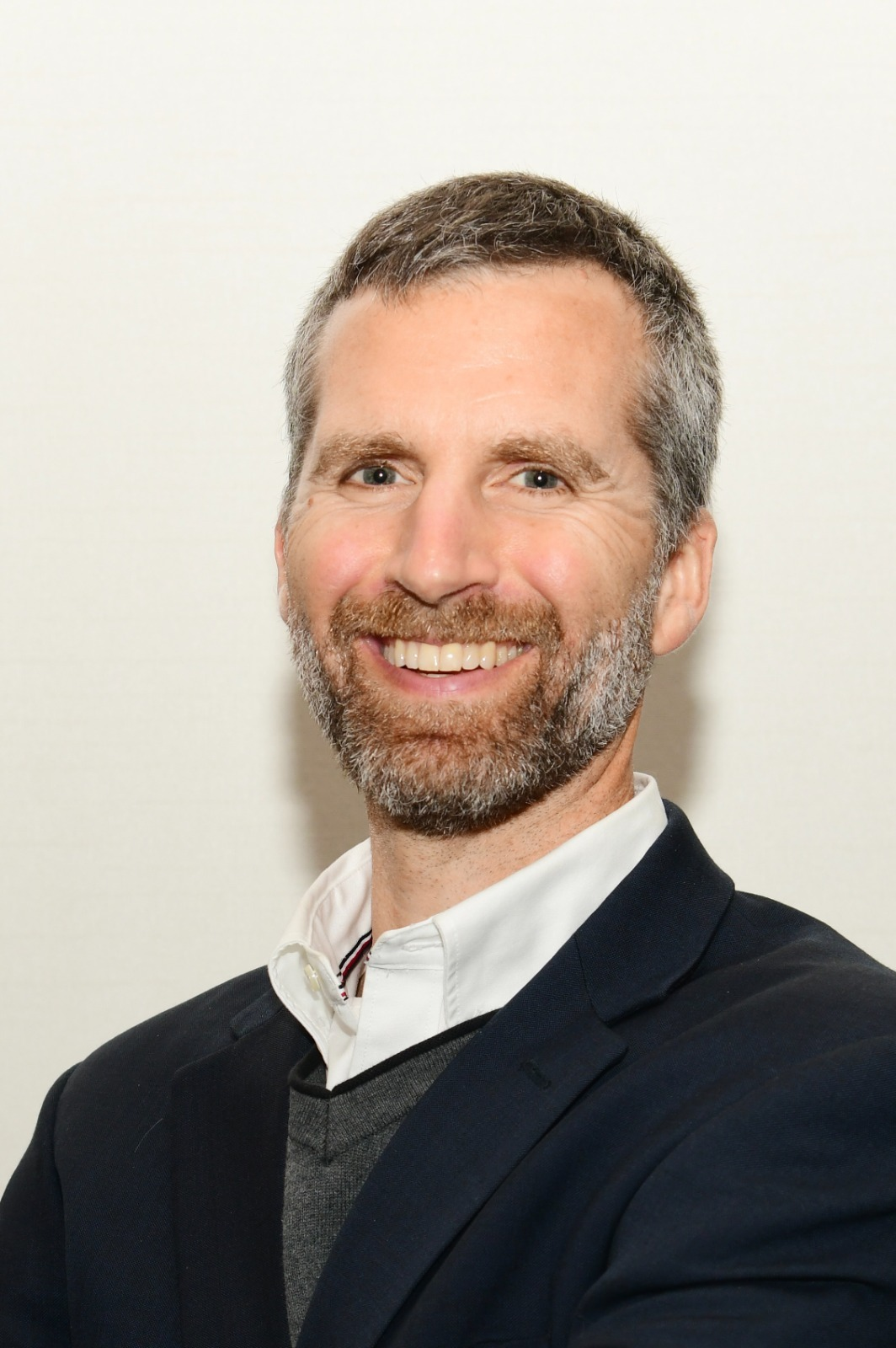
- Paley's Portrait
- Born: Derek Andrew Paley
- Education: Yale University (BS); Princeton University (Ph.D)
- Known for: Aerospace engineer and roboticist at the University of Maryland
- Scientific career
- Fields: Aerospace engineering; Robotics
- Workplaces: University of Maryland, College Park

Derek Andrew Paley is an American aerospace engineer, academic, and researcher specializing in collective dynamics and control in natural and robotic systems. He is the Willis H. Young Jr. Professor of Aerospace Engineering Education at the University of Maryland, College Park, where he holds a joint appointment with the Institute for Systems Research (ISR).

In 2025, Paley was named a Fellow of the American Society of Mechanical Engineers (ASME).

== Education and career ==
Paley earned a Bachelor of Science degree in Applied Physics from Yale University in 1997 and went on to receive a Doctor of Philosophy in Mechanical and Aerospace Engineering from Princeton University in 2007.

He founded the Collective Dynamics and Control Laboratory (CDCL) in 2007, focusing on the development of algorithms and control systems for autonomous robotic vehicles and bioinspired systems. While serving as director of the Maryland Robotics Center from 2019 to 2025, Paley oversaw developments in robotics education and research at the University of Maryland.

He has received teaching awards, such as the UMD Distinguished Scholar-Teacher Award and the Exemplary Researcher Award. Paley also served as the Technical Director of the M.Eng. Robotics program from 2019-2025.

The Autonomous Micro Air Vehicle (AMAV) team, which he founded, has won multiple national awards, including the NIST UAS First Responder Challenge. He was also honored as a UMD Distinguished Scholar-Teacher for the 2020–2021 academic year. He is also an associate fellow with the American Institute of Aeronautics and Astronautics and is a senior member of the Institute of Electrical and Electronics Engineers.

Paley leads Team RoboScout, which is a finalist in the DARPA Triage Challenge.

He also served as faculty facilitator of the University of Maryland's Autonomous Micro Air Vehicle team in the Defense Advanced Research Projects Agency (DARPA) Lift Challenge, where the team’s Leviathan aircraft received the Most Revolutionary Aerodynamic Design award and a $500,000 prize. Paley was the team's founding director and participated in the project alongside faculty, engineers, and students from the University of Maryland.

== Research ==
His work includes developing distributed control algorithms, conducting hypothesis-driven studies on biological collectives, and optimizing sensor networks for environmental monitoring. His research has been funded by agencies such as DARPA, the Army Research Laboratory (ARL), and the Office of Naval Research (ONR), with total funding exceeding $25 million since 2007.

Paley's research integrates dynamics, estimation, and control theory to address challenges in autonomous robotics, mobile sensor networks, and bioinspired engineering. His interest in autonomous systems began in the late 1990s when he encountered autonomous underwater vehicles, which led him to pursue graduate studies in control systems. Paley's recent work involves developing self-driving scooters, focusing on their ability to reposition themselves for greater convenience in shared spaces like college campuses.

Paley and his team have developed fish-inspired underwater vehicles with flexible tails powered by electric motors and momentum wheels. These robots are designed to mimic real fish movements and respond to hydrodynamic signals, including vortices generated by nearby "fish."

== Selected publications ==
=== Journals ===
- DeVries, Levi; Lagor, Francis D.; Lei, Hong; Tan, Xiaobo; Paley, Derek A. (25 March 2015). "Distributed flow estimation and closed-loop control of an underwater vehicle with a multi-modal artificial lateral line". Bioinspiration & Biomimetics. 10 (2) 025002. Bibcode:2015BiBi...10b5002D. doi:10.1088/1748-3190/10/2/025002. ISSN 1748-3190. PMID 25807584.
- Butail, Sachit; Manoukis, Nicholas; Diallo, Moussa; Ribeiro, José M.; Lehmann, Tovi; Paley, Derek A. (23 May 2012). "Reconstructing the flight kinematics of swarming and mating in wild mosquitoes". Journal of the Royal Society Interface. 9 (75): 2624–2638. doi:10.1098/rsif.2012.0150. PMC 3427502. PMID 22628212.
- Butail, Sachit; Paley, Derek A. (2 June 2011). "Three-dimensional reconstruction of the fast-start swimming kinematics of densely schooling fish". Journal of the Royal Society Interface. 9 (66): 77–88. doi:10.1098/rsif.2011.0113. PMC 3223621. PMID 21642367.
- Leonard, Naomi Ehrich; Paley, Derek A.; Lekien, Francois; Sepulchre, Rodolphe; Fratantoni, David M.; Davis, Russ E. (2007). "Collective Motion, Sensor Networks, and Ocean Sampling". Proceedings of the IEEE. 95 (1): 48–74. doi:10.1109/jproc.2006.887295. hdl:1912/1600. ISSN 0018-9219.
- Fiorelli, E.; Leonard, N.E.; Bhatta, P.; Paley, D.; Bachmayer, R.; Fratantoni, D.M. (2004). "Multi-AUV control and adaptive sampling in Monterey Bay". 2004 IEEE/OES Autonomous Underwater Vehicles (IEEE Cat. No.04CH37578). IEEE. pp. 134–147. doi:10.1109/auv.2004.1431204. ISBN 0-7803-8543-8.
- Sepulchre, Rodolphe; Paley, Derek A.; Leonard, Naomi Ehrich (2007). "Stabilization of Planar Collective Motion: All-to-All Communication". IEEE Transactions on Automatic Control. 52 (5): 811–824. Bibcode:2007ITAC...52..811S. doi:10.1109/tac.2007.898077. hdl:2268/33233. ISSN 0018-9286.
- Sepulchre, Rodolphe; Paley, Derek A.; Leonard, Naomi Ehrich (2008). "Stabilization of Planar Collective Motion With Limited Communication". IEEE Transactions on Automatic Control. 53 (3): 706–719. Bibcode:2008ITAC...53..706S. doi:10.1109/tac.2008.919857. hdl:2268/75775. ISSN 0018-9286.
- Leonard, Naomi E.; Paley, Derek A.; Davis, Russ E.; Fratantoni, David M.; Lekien, Francois; Zhang, Fumin (2010-09-21). "Coordinated control of an underwater glider fleet in an adaptive ocean sampling field experiment in Monterey Bay". Journal of Field Robotics. 27 (6): 718–740. doi:10.1002/rob.20366. hdl:1853/38910. ISSN 1556-4959.
- "Oscillator Models and Collective Motion". IEEE Control Systems. 27 (4): 89–105. 2007. doi:10.1109/mcs.2007.384123. hdl:2268/25413. ISSN 1066-033X.
- Paley, D.A.; Zhang, F.; Leonard, N.E. (2008). "Cooperative Control for Ocean Sampling: The Glider Coordinated Control System". IEEE Transactions on Control Systems Technology. 16 (4): 735–744. Bibcode:2008ITCST..16..735P. doi:10.1109/tcst.2007.912238. ISSN 1063-6536.
- Zhang, F.; Fratantoni, D. M.; Paley, D. A.; Lund, J. M.; Leonard, N. E. (2007). "Control of coordinated patterns for ocean sampling". International Journal of Control. 80 (7): 1186–1199. Bibcode:2007IJC....80.1186Z. doi:10.1080/00207170701222947. hdl:1853/38880. ISSN 0020-7179.
- Sepulchre, Rodolphe; Paley, Derek; Leonard, Naomi (2004-11-13), "Collective Motion and Oscillator Synchronization", Lecture Notes in Control and Information Sciences, Berlin, Heidelberg: Springer Berlin Heidelberg, pp. 189–205, doi:10.1007/978-3-540-31595-7_11, hdl:2268/33568, ISBN 978-3-540-22861-5
- Bachmayer, R.; Leonard, N.E.; Graver, J.; Fiorelli, E.; Bhatta, P.; Paley, D. (2004). "Underwater gliders: Recent developments and future applications". Proceedings of the 2004 International Symposium on Underwater Technology (IEEE Cat. No.04EX869). IEEE. pp. 195–200. doi:10.1109/ut.2004.1405540. ISBN 0-7803-8541-1.

=== Books ===
- Kasdin, N. Jeremy; Paley, Derek A. (2011). Engineering dynamics: a comprehensive introduction. Princeton, NJ: Princeton University Press. ISBN 978-0-691-13537-3.
