= Gerry McCormac =

Scottish physicist and administrator

Sir Gerry McCormac

Principal and Vice-Chancellor of the University of Stirling
- Incumbent
- Assumed office 1 May 2010
- Preceded by: Christine Hallett

Personal details
- Born: 1 August 1958 (age 68) Belfast, County Antrim, Northern Ireland
- Spouse: Louise Gormley
- Children: Three sons
- Education: Ulster Polytechnic (BSc, PhD)
- Profession: Physicist, academic administrator
- Salary: £414,000 (2023–24)
- Website: https://www.stir.ac.uk/about/senior-officers-of-the-university/gerry-mccormac/

Sir Francis Gerard McCormac, FRSE, FSA, FRSA, FHEA (born 1 August 1958) is the Principal and Vice-Chancellor of the University of Stirling. He is a physicist whose specialist fields are space physics and carbon dating. He is a member of the advisory board of the International College for Liberal Arts at Yamanashi Gakuin University in Japan. Previous roles include Professor and Pro Vice-Chancellor at Queen's University Belfast and Vice-Chairman of Invest Northern Ireland. He chaired a review of teacher employment for the Scottish Government in 2011.

== Early life ==
He was born in Belfast, County Antrim, Northern Ireland on 1 August 1958, the eldest of seven children of Francis McCormac and Jean Heaney. He attended St. Kevin's Primary School on the Falls Road where his P6 teacher inspired him to develop a career in science.

== Career ==
He graduated in Physics and Geology (1980) and obtained a PhD in Physics (1984) from Ulster Polytechnic, before becoming a post-doctoral research fellow at the University of Michigan. There he conducted research on the NASA Dynamics Explorer satellite program. He specialised in remote sensing of the atmosphere using Fabry–Pérot interferometers to measure thermospheric wind speeds and temperatures to assess their relationship to the Interplanetary Magnetic Field. Between 1990 and 2001, he was Director of the High-Precision Carbon Dating Facility at Queen's University Belfast and a lecturer and senior lecturer in Environmental Monitoring. During this period, he founded the Centre for Archaeological Fieldwork (CAF) and the Centre for the Climate, Environment and Chronology (Chrono Centre). He was a member of the Archaeology Committee of the Royal Irish Academy. He carbon dated monuments of international importance for English Heritage, Historic Scotland and the Environment and Heritage Service including; Stonehenge, the Pazyryk burials in Siberia, Seahenge near Sandringham, the Dover Bronze Age Boat, Sutton Hoo and New Grange.

He became head of the School of Archaeology and Palaeoecology in 1997 and Professor of Scientific Archaeology in 1998. As pro vice-chancellor (PVC) at Queen's from 2001 to 2010, he had responsibility for Academic and Financial Planning, Economic Development and External Affairs. He served on the Northern Ireland (NI) Committee of the Institute of Directors, the NI Economic Development Forum, the NI Science and Industry Panel (MATRIX) and the boards of both the NI Science Park and Business in the Community. He was a director and chair of the management board of Queen's University's commercialisation company, QUBIS. He was vice-chairman and a board member of Invest Northern Ireland from 2008 to 2014. In 2010 he became principal and vice-chancellor at the University of Stirling. He chaired a review of the terms and conditions of teacher employment for the Scottish Government in 2011 and served as an external board member to oversee the merger of the Department of Employment and Learning and the Department for Enterprise, Trade and Investment to form the Department for the Economy in Northern Ireland.

He is currently Vice-Convener of Universities Scotland, a board member of the Universities and Colleges Employers' Association (UCEA) and Chairman of the UCEA Scottish Committee, a member of Universities UK and a trustee of the Carnegie Trust for the Universities of Scotland. He was Vice-Chairman of Bridge Integrated Primary School in Northern Ireland during the 1990s. McCormac was elected a Fellow of the Royal Society of Edinburgh in 2017.

McCormac was knighted in the 2021 New Year Honours for services to education and the economy.

== Among published works ==
- "Anglo-Saxon Graves and Grave Goods of the 6th and 7th centuries AD: A Chronological Framework" with Bayliss, Hines, Nielsen and Scull ISBN 9781909662063 (2013)
- "The Norfolk Bronze Age Timber Circle" with Bayliss, Groves, Baillie and Brown Nature, 402, 479, (1999)
- "Science and Stonehenge: Dating Stonehenge" with Bayliss and Bronk Ramsey ISBN 9780197261743 (1998)
- "Stonehenge in its Landscape" with Housley ISBN 9781850746058 (1995)
- "Austral thermospheric wind circulation and IMF orientation" with Hernandez and Smith Journal of Geophysical Research 96, 5777, (1991)
- "Polar cap diurnal temperature variations: Observations and Modeling" with Killeen, Burns, Meriwether, and Roble Journal of Geophysical Research 93, 7466, (1988)
- "Circulation of the polar thermosphere during geomagnetically quiet and active times as observed by Dynamics Explorer 2" with Killeen, Thayer, Hernandez, Tschan, Ponthieu and Spencer Journal of Geophysical Research 92, 10133, (1987)
- "Configuration of the high-latitude thermosphere neutral circulation for IMF By negative and positive" with Killeen, Gombosi, Hays and Spencer Geophysical Research Letters 12, 155, (1985)
- "The influence of the interplanetary magnetic field Y component on ion and neutral motions in the polar thermosphere" with Smith Geophysical Research Letters 1, 935, (1984)

Academic offices
Preceded by Christine Hallett	Vice-chancellor of the University of Stirling; May 2010–present	Succeeded by Incumbent
