= Last Battle =

Last Battle may refer to:

== Books ==
- The Last Battle, a 1956 novel by C. S. Lewis
- The Last Battle (Ryan book), a 1966 book about the Battle of Berlin in World War II by Cornelius Ryan
- The Last Battle (Harding book), a 2013 book about the Battle for Castle Itter in World War II by Stephen Harding

== Films ==
- Le Dernier Combat (English title: The Last Battle), a 1983 French film directed by Luc Besson
- The Last Battle (1923 film), a German silent film
- Vietnam: The Last Battle, a documentary film

== Events ==
- Armageddon, in Christian theology, the final battle between God and Satan
- The Last Battle (Middle-earth), or Dagor Dagorath, in J. R. R. Tolkien's Middle-earth legendarium
- Tarmon Gai'don, or the Last Battle, an event in The Wheel of Time series by Robert Jordan

== Other ==
- The Last Battle (band), Scottish alternative indie folk band
- Last Battle (video game), a 1989 Sega video game
- "The Last Battle" (Star Wars Rebels)
