= Dynamics Explorer 2 =

NASA satellite of the Explorer program

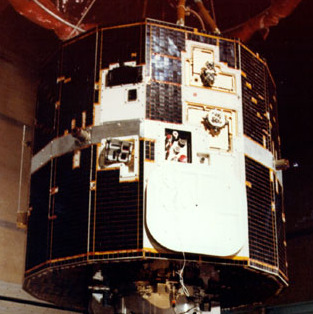
- Names: Explorer 63; Dynamics Explorer-B
- Mission type: Space physics
- Operator: NASA
- COSPAR ID: 1981-070B
- SATCAT no.: 12625
- Mission duration: 1 year (planned); 1.5 years (achieved)

Spacecraft properties
- Spacecraft: Explorer LXIII
- Spacecraft type: Dynamics Explorer
- Bus: DE
- Manufacturer: Goddard Space Flight Center
- Launch mass: 420 kg (930 lb)
- Dimensions: 137 cm (54 in) in diameter and 115 cm (45 in) high
- Power: 115 watts

Start of mission
- Launch date: 3 August 1981, 09:56 UTC
- Rocket: Thor-Delta 3913 (Thor 642 / Delta 155)
- Launch site: Vandenberg, SLC-2W
- Contractor: Douglas Aircraft Company
- Entered service: 3 August 1981

End of mission
- Decay date: 19 February 1983

Orbital parameters
- Reference system: Geocentric orbit
- Regime: Low Earth orbit
- Perigee altitude: 309 km (192 mi)
- Apogee altitude: 1,012 km (629 mi)
- Inclination: 89.99°
- Period: 98.00 minutes

Instruments
- Atmospheric Dynamics and Energetics Investigation; Fabry–Pérot interferometer (FPI); Ion Drift Meter (IDM); Langmuir Probe Instrument(LANG); Low Altitude Plasma Instrument (LAPI); Low Altitude Plasma Investigation High Angular Resolution; Magnetic Field Observations (MAG-B); Magnetospheric Energy Coupling To The Atmosphere Investigation; Neutral Atmosphere Composition Spectrometer (NACS); Neutral-Plasma Interactions Investigation; Retarding Potential Analyzer (RPA); Vector Electric Field Instrument (VEFI); Wind and Temperature Spectrometer (WATS)

Dynamics Explorer 2 (DE-2 or Explorer 63) was a NASA low-altitude mission, launched on 3 August 1981. It consisted of two satellites, DE-1 and DE-2, whose purpose was to investigate the interactions between plasmas in the magnetosphere and those in the ionosphere. The two satellites were launched together into polar coplanar orbits, which allowed them to simultaneously observe the upper and lower parts of the atmosphere.

== Mission ==
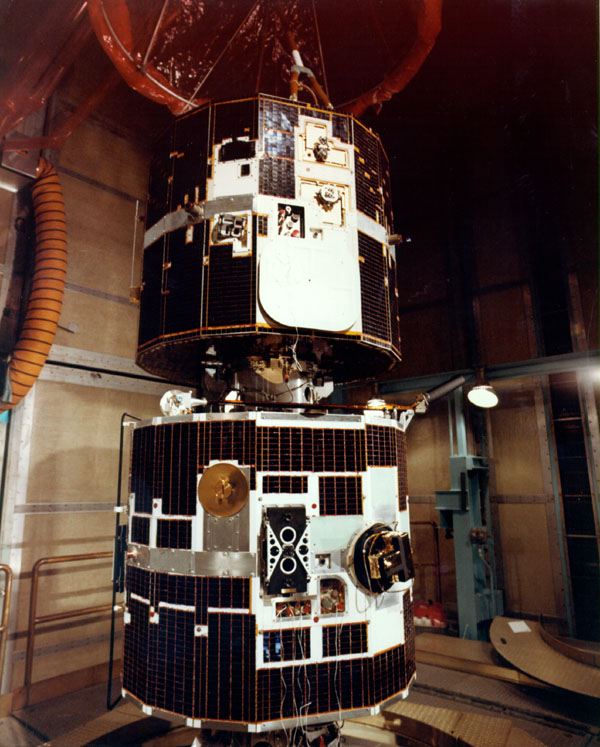
Dynamics Explorer 1 (Explorer 62) at the bottom and Dynamics Explorer 2 (Explorer 63) at the top

The DE 2 spacecraft (low-altitude mission) complemented the high-altitude mission Dynamics Explorer 1 and was placed into an orbit with a perigee sufficiently low to permit measurements of neutral composition, temperature, and wind. The apogee was high enough to permit measurements above the interaction regions of suprathermal ions, and also plasma flow measurements at the feet of the magnetospheric field lines. The Dynamics Explorer mission is to investigate the strong interactive processes coupling the hot, tenuous, convecting plasmas of the magnetosphere and the cooler, denser plasmas and gases corotating in the Earth's ionosphere, upper atmosphere, and plasmasphere. Two satellites, DE-1 and DE-2, were launched together and were placed in polar coplanar orbits, permitting simultaneous measurements at high and low altitudes in the same field-line region.

== Spacecraft ==
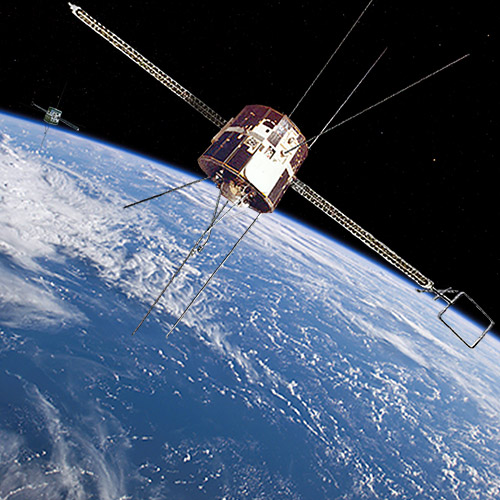
Artist rendering of the Dynamics Explorer 2 satellite

The general form of the spacecraft was a short polygon of 137 cm (54 in) in diameter and 115 cm (45 in) high. The triaxial antennas were 23 m (75 ft) tip-to-tip. One 6 m (20 ft) boom was provided for remote measurements. The spacecraft weight was 420 kg (930 lb). Power was supplied by a solar cell array, which charged two 6-ampere hour nickel-cadmium batteries. The spacecraft was three-axis stabilized with the yaw axis aligned toward the center of the Earth to within 1°. The spin axis was normal to the orbit plane within 1° with a spin rate of one revolution per orbit. A single-axis scan platform was included in order to mount the low-altitude plasma instrument (1981-070B-08). The platform rotated about the spin axis. A pulse code modulation telemetry data system was used that operated in real-time or in a tape recorder mode. Data were acquired on a science-problem-oriented basis, with closely coordinated operations of the various instruments, both satellites and supportive experiments. Measurements were temporarily stored on tape recorders before transmission at an 8:1 playback-to-record ratio. Since commands were also stored in a command memory unit, spacecraft operations were not real-time.

== Experiments ==
=== Atmospheric Dynamics and Energetics Investigation ===
The purpose of this investigation was to study the dynamic responses of the thermosphere and ionosphere to energy deposition in the form of Joule heating, particle precipitation, and momentum transfer by electric field-generated drifts. The objective was to determine the relative importance of the various phenomena and the conditions under which ordering occurs. Because the relative importance of the different processes varied with geomagnetic activity, both geomagnetically quiet and disturbed conditions were examined. Using theoretical models as tools, the principal goal was to quantitatively analyze the physical processes involved in the energy coupling between the magnetosphere and the thermosphere. In addition to data obtained from various DE satellite instruments, the investigation planned to use ground-based correlative measurements.

=== Fabry-Pérot Interferometer (FPI) ===
The Fabry–Pérot interferometer (FPI) was a high-resolution remote sensing instrument designed to measure the thermospheric temperature, meridional wind, and density of the following metastable atoms: atomic oxygen (singlet S and D) and the 2P state of ionic atomic oxygen. The FPI performed a wavelength analysis on the light detected from the thermospheric emission features by spatially scanning the interference fringe plane with a multichannel array detector. The wavelength analysis characterized the Doppler line profile of the emitting species. A sequential altitude scan performed by a commandable horizon scan mirror provided a cross-sectional view of the thermodynamic and dynamic state of the thermosphere below the DE-2 orbit. The information obtained from this investigation was used to study the dynamic response of the thermosphere to the energy sources caused by magnetospheric electric fields and the absorption of solar ultraviolet light in the thermosphere. The instrument was based on the visible airglow experiment (VAE) used in the Atmospheric Explorer program. The addition of a scanning mirror, the Fabry–Pérot etalon, an image plane detector, and a calibration lamp were the principal differences. Interference filters isolated lines at (in Angstroms) 5577, 6300, 7320, 5896, and 5200. The FPI had a field of view of 0.53° (half-cone angle). From 16 February 1982 to 11 September 1982 the DE-2 satellite was inverted and the FPI measured galactic emissions.

=== Ion Drift Meter (IDM) ===
The Ion drift meter (IDM) measured the bulk motions of the ionospheric plasma perpendicular to the satellite velocity vector. The measured parameters, horizontal and vertical ion-drift velocities, had an expected range of ± 4 km/s (2.5 mi/s). The accuracy of the measurement was expected to be ± 50 km/s (31 mi/s) for the anticipated 0.5° accuracy in vehicle attitude determination. The nominal time resolution of the measurement was 1/32 seconds. This investigation yielded information on: (1) the ion convection (electric field) pattern in the auroral and polar ionosphere; (2) the flow of plasma along magnetic field lines within the plasmasphere, which determines whether this motion was simply a breathing of the protonosphere, a refilling of this region after a storm, or an interhemispheric transport of plasma; (3) the thermal ion contribution to field-aligned electric currents; (4) velocity fields associated with small-scale phenomena that are important at both low and high latitudes; and (5) the magnitude and variation of the total concentration along the flight path. The ion drift meter measured the plasma motion parallel to the sensor face by using a gridded collimator and multiple collectors to determine the direction of arrival of the plasma. The instrument geometry was very similar to that used on the Atmospheric Explorer satellites. Each sensor consisted of a square entrance aperture that served as collimator, some electrically isolating grids, and a segmented planar collector. The angle of arrival of the ions with respect to the sensor was determined by measuring the ratio of the currents to the different collector segments, and this was done by taking the difference in the Logarithms of the current. Two techniques were used to determine this ratio. In the standard drift sensor (SDS), the collector segments were connected in pairs to two logarithmic amplifiers. The second technique, called the universal drift sensor (UDS), allowed simultaneous measurement of both components. Here, each collector segment was permanently connected to a logarithmic amplifier and two difference amplifiers were used to determine the horizontal and vertical arrival angles simultaneously. The IDM consisted of two sensors, one providing the SDS output and the other providing the UDS output. During the period from 17 March 1981 to 7 May 1982, the instrument memory suffered a critical upset and ion temperatures and drifts were not available during this period.

=== Langmuir Probe Instrument (LANG) ===
The Langmuir Probe Instrument (LANG) was a cylindrical electrostatic probe that obtained measurements of electron temperature, Tellurium (Te), and electron or ion concentration, Ne or Ni, respectively, and spacecraft potential. Data from this investigation were used to provide temperature and density measurements along magnetic field lines related to thermal energy and particle flows within the magnetosphere-ionosphere system, to provide thermal plasma conditions for wave-particle interactions, and to measure large-scale and fine-structure ionospheric effects of energy deposition in the ionosphere. The Langmuir probe instrument was identical to that used on the Atmospheric Explorer satellites and the Pioneer Venus Orbiter. Two independent sensors were connected to individual adaptive sweep voltage circuits which continuously tracked the changing electron temperature and spacecraft potential, while autoranging electrometers adjusted their gain in response to the changing plasma density. The control signals used to achieve this automatic tracking provided a continuous monitor of the ionospheric parameters without telemetering each volt-ampere (V-I) curve. Furthermore, internal data storage circuits permitted high resolution, high data rate sampling of selected V-I curves for transmission to ground to verify or correct the inflight processed data. Time resolution was 0.5 seconds.

=== Low Altitude Plasma Instrument (LAPI) ===
The Low Altitude Plasma Instrument (LAPI) provided high-resolution velocity space measurements of positive ions and electrons from 5 eV to 32 keV, and a monitor of electrons with energies above 35 keV. Pitch angle measurements covered the full 180° range. Data from this investigation and supporting measurements were used to study: (1) the identification and intensities of Birkeland currents, (2) auroral particle source regions and acceleration mechanisms, (3) the existence and role of E parallel to B, (4) sources and effects of polar cap particle fluxes, (5) the transport of plasma within and through the magnetospheric cusp, (6) dynamic configurations of high-latitude flux tubes, (7) loss-cone effects of wave-particle interactions, (8) hot-cold plasma interactions, (9) ionospheric effects of particle precipitation, and (10) plasma convection at high altitudes. The instrument contained an array of 15 parabolic electrostatic analyzers of the ISIS 2 type, each with an electron channel and an ion channel, in order to obtain detailed pitch-angle distributions as a function of energy. Two Geiger–Müller counters were mounted on the scan platform. The basic mode of operation provided a 32-point energy spectrum in the range 5 eV to 32 keV every second. The voltages on the electrostatic analyzers were programmable to allow for greater space/time resolution over limited portions of the energy and angular distributions. The instrument was mounted on a one-axis scan platform controlled by a magnetometer, whose purpose was to maintain the detector array, which spanned 180°, at a nearly constant angle to the magnetic field. From 16 March 1982 to 4 April 1982 the instrument was turned off for corrective action.

=== Low Altitude Plasma Investigation High Angular Resolution ===
This investigation used the suprathermal particle distribution functions measured by both the high-(1981-070A-05) and low-(1981-070B-08) altitude plasma instruments. The objectives were: (1) to study the properties and locations of auroral acceleration mechanisms, (2) to determine the nature and distribution of electric fields parallel to the magnetic field, (3) to identify the charge carriers of the major electric current systems coupling the magnetosphere and ionosphere, and (4) to determine relations between these quantities and the convection electric field and auroral light emission patterns.

=== Magnetic Field Observations (MAG-B) ===
A triaxial fluxgate magnetometer (MAG-B), similar to one on board Dynamics Explorer 1 (1981-070A-01), was used to obtain magnetic field data needed to study the magnetosphere-ionosphere-atmosphere coupling. The primary objectives of this investigation were to measure field-aligned currents in the auroral oval and over the polar cap at two different altitudes using the two spacecraft and to correlate these measurements with observations of electric fields, plasma waves, suprathermal particles, thermal particles, and auroral images obtained from investigation 1981-070A-03. The magnetometer had digital compensation of the ambient field in 8.E3 nT (8.E3 gamma) increments. The instrument incorporated its own 12-bit analog-to-digital converter, a 4-bit digital compensation register for each axis, and a system control that generated a 48-bit data word consisting of a 16-bit representation of the field measured along each of three magnetometer axes. Track and hold modules were used to obtain simultaneous samples on all three axes. The instrument bandwidth was 25 Hz. The analog range was ± 6.2E4 nT, the accuracy was ± 4 nT, and the resolution was 1.5 nT. The time resolution was 16 vector samples per second.

=== Magnetospheric Energy Coupling To The Atmosphere Investigation ===
This investigation used data from various spacecraft instruments to study the following: (1) global thermospheric dynamics (the effects of energy input to the thermosphere from the magnetosphere by convection, Joule heating, particle precipitation and tidal energy), (2) the convective coupling of the thermal plasma between the ionosphere and magnetosphere; and (3) the energy-loss mechanisms of ionospheric photoelectrons in the plasmasphere.

=== Neutral Atmosphere Composition Spectrometer (NACS) ===
The Neutral Atmosphere Composition Spectrometer (NACS) was designed to obtain in situ measurements of the neutral atmospheric composition and to study the variations of the neutral atmosphere in response to energy coupled into it from the magnetosphere. Because temperature enhancements, large-scale circulation cells, and wave propagation are produced by energy input (each of which possesses a specific signature in composition variation), the measurements permitted the study of the partition, flow, and deposition of energy from the magnetosphere. Specifically, the investigation objective was to characterize the composition of the neutral atmosphere with particular emphasis on variability in constituent densities driven by interactions in the atmosphere, ionosphere, and magnetosphere system. The quadrupole mass spectrometer used was nearly identical to those flown on the Explorer 51 (AE-C), Explorer 54 (AE-D), and Explorer 55 (AE-E) missions. The electron-impact ion source was used in a closed mode. Atmospheric particles entered an antechamber through a knife-edged orifice, where they were thermalized to the instrument temperature. The ions with the selected charge-to-mass ratios had stable trajectories through the hyperbolic electric field, exited the analyzer, and entered the detection system. An off-axis beryllium-copper dynode multiplier operating at a gain of 2.E6 provided an output pulse of electrons for each ion arrival. The detector output had a pulse rate proportional to the neutral density in the ion source of the selected mass. The instrument also included two baffles that scanned across the input orifice for optional measurement of the zonal and vertical components of the neutral wind. The mass select system provided for 256 mass values between 0 and 51 atomic mass units (u) or each 0.2 unit. It was possible to call any one of these mass numbers into each of eight 0.016-second intervals. This sequence was repeated every 0.128 seconds.

=== Neutral-Plasma Interactions Investigation ===
This investigation used data from several spacecraft instruments to study the large-scale neutral-plasma interactions in the thermosphere caused by magnetospheric-ionospheric and thermospheric coupling processes. Planned use of the models is to provide a theoretical framework in which certain important ionospheric and atmospheric properties needed for coupling processes (such as the Pedersen and Hall conductivities) were consistently calculated using satellite data measured at a given height. Planned examples are: (1) to calculate vertical profiles of ionospheric properties that were useful for comparison with incoherent scatter radar measurements and other ground-based supporting data, (2) to identify and evaluate the neutral thermospheric heat and momentum sources, and (3) to determine the effectiveness of high-latitude dynamic processes in controlling the global thermospheric circulation and thermal structure.

=== Retarding Potential Analyzer (RPA) ===
The Retarding Potential Analyzer (RPA) measured the bulk ion velocity in the direction of the spacecraft motion, the constituent ion concentrations, and the ion temperature along the satellite path. These parameters were derived from a least squares fit to the ion number flux versus energy curve obtained by sweeping or stepping the voltage applied to the internal retarding grids of the RPA. In addition, a separate wide aperture sensor, a duct sensor, was flown to measure the spectral characteristics of irregularities in the total ion concentration. The measured parameters obtained from this investigation were important to the understanding of mechanisms that influence the plasma; i.e. to understand the coupling between the solar wind and the Earth's atmosphere. The measurements were made with a multigridded planar retarding potential analyzer very similar in concept and geometry to the instruments carried on the Atmospheric Explorer satellites. The retarding potential was variable in the range from approximately +32 to 0 volts. The details of this voltage trace, and whether it was continuous or stepped, depended on the operating mode of the instrument. Specific parameters deduced from these measurements were ion temperature; vehicle potential; ram component of the ion drift velocity; the ion and electron concentration irregularity spectrum; and the concentration of H+, He+, O+, and Fe+, and of molecular ions near perigee.

=== Vector Electric Field Instrument (VEFI) ===
The Vector Electric Field Instrument (VEFI) used flight-proven double-probe techniques with 20 m (66 ft) baselines to obtain measurements of DC electric fields. This electric field investigation had the following objectives: (1) to obtain accurate and comprehensive triaxial DC electric field measurements at ionospheric altitudes in order to refine the basic spatial patterns, define the large-scale time history of these patterns, and study the small-scale temporal and spatial variations within the overall patterns; (2) to study the degree to which and in what region the electric field projects to the equatorial plane; (3) to obtain measurements of extremely low frequency (ELF) and lower frequency irregularity structures; and (4) to perform numerous correlative studies. The instrument consisted of six cylindrical elements 11 m (36 ft) long and 2.8 cm (1.1 in) in diameter. Each antenna was insulated from the plasma except for the outer 2 m (6 ft 7 in). The baseline, or distance between the midpoints of these 2 m (6 ft 7 in) active elements, was 20 m. The antennas were interlocked along the edges to prevent oscillation and to increase their rigidity against drag forces. The basic electronic system was very similar in concept to those used on Explorer 50 (IMP-J) and ISEE-1 but modified for a three-axis measurement on a nonspinning spacecraft. At the core of the system were the high-impedance (1.E12 ohm) preamplifiers, whose outputs were accurately subtracted and digitized (14-bit A/D conversion for sensitivity to about 0.1 microvolt/m) to maintain high resolution, for subsequent removal of the cross-product of the vectors V and B in data processing. This provided the basic DC measurement. Other circuitry was used to aid in interpreting the DC data and to measure rapid variations in the signals detected by the antennas. The planned DC electric field range was ± 1 V/m, the planned resolution was 0.1 mV/m, and the variational electric field was measured from 4 Hz to 1024 Hz. The DC electric field was measured at 16 samples/second. The variational electric field was measured from 1 microvolt/m to 10 mV/m RMS. The antenna pair perpendicular to the orbit plane did not deploy.

=== Wind and Temperature Spectrometer (WATS) ===
The Wind and Temperature Spectrometer (WATS) measured the in situ neutral winds, the neutral particle temperatures, and the concentrations of selected gases. The objective of this investigation was to study the interrelationships among the winds, temperatures, plasma drift, electric fields, and other properties of the thermosphere that were measured by this and other instruments on the spacecraft. Knowledge of how these properties are interrelated contributed to an understanding of the consequences of the acceleration of neutral particles by the ions in the ionosphere, the acceleration of ions by neutrals creating electric fields, and the related energy transfer between the ionosphere and the magnetosphere. Three components of the wind, one normal to the satellite velocity vector in the horizontal plane, one vertical, and one in the satellite direction were measured. A retarding potential quadrupole mass spectrometer, coupled to the atmosphere through a precisely orificed antechamber, was used. It was operated in either of two modes: one employed the retarding capability and the other used the ion source as a conventional nonretarding source. Two scanning baffles were used in front of the mass spectrometer: one moved vertically and the other moved horizontally. The magnitudes of the horizontal and vertical components of the wind normal to the spacecraft velocity vector were computed from measurements of the angular relationship between the neutral particle stream and the sensor. The component of the total stream velocity in the satellite direction was measured directly by the spectrometer system through determination of the required retarding potential. At altitudes too high for neutral species measurements, the planned operation required the instrument to measure the thermal ion species only. A series of four sequentially occurring "slots" – each a 2-seconds long measurement interval – was adapted for the basic measurement format of the instrument. Different functions were commanded into these "slots" in any combination, one per measurement interval. Thus the time resolution can be 2, 4, 6, or 8 seconds.

== Mission results ==
As a result of a malfunction in the Thor-Delta 3913 launch vehicle in which its main engine shut off slightly early, DE-2 was placed into a slightly lower orbit than was anticipated. This was not a serious problem, and the spacecraft had lasted its expected lifespan when it re-entered the Earth's atmosphere on 19 February 1983.

== Atmospheric entry ==
Dynamics Explorer-2, was in a lower orbit when the mission was officially terminated. Dynamics Explorer 2 reentered the atmosphere on 19 February 1983.

== See also ==
- Dynamics Explorer 1
- Explorer program
