= Ionospheric Connection Explorer =

NASA satellite of the Explorer program

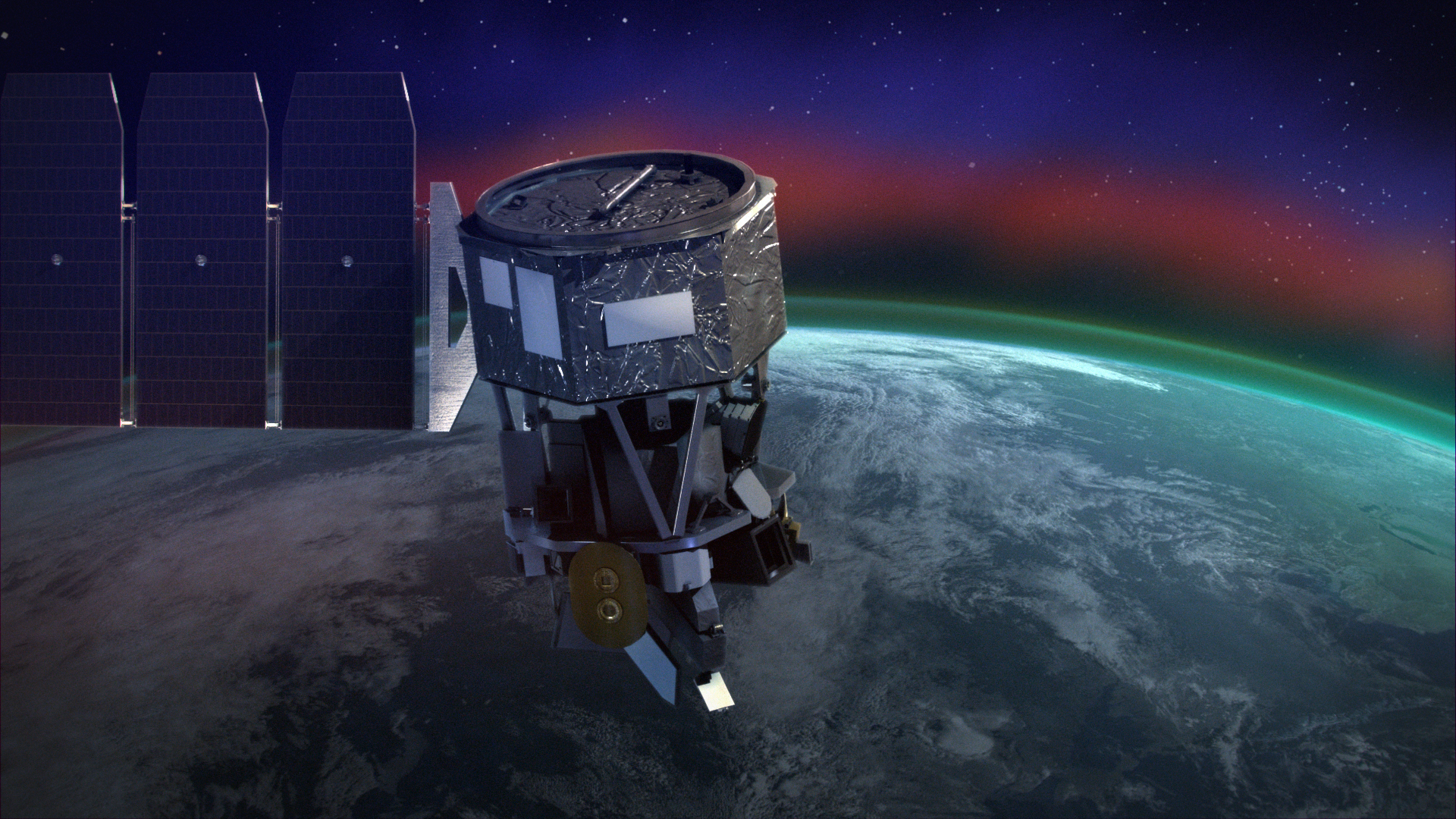
- ICON (Explorer 96) satellite
- Names: Explorer 96; ICON
- Mission type: Ionospheric research
- Operator: UC Berkeley SSL / NASA
- COSPAR ID: 2019-068A
- SATCAT no.: 44628
- Website: icon.ssl.berkeley.edu
- Mission duration: 2 years (planned); Final: 3 years, 1 month, 14 days

Spacecraft properties
- Spacecraft: Explorer XCVI
- Spacecraft type: Ionospheric Connection Explorer
- Bus: LEOStar-2
- Manufacturer: University of California, Berkeley / Northrop Grumman
- Launch mass: 288 kg (635 lb)
- Dimensions: Height: 193 cm (76 in) and 106 cm (42 in) of diameter Solar panel: 254 × 84 cm (100 × 33 in)
- Power: 780 watts

Start of mission
- Launch date: 11 October 2019, 02:00 UTC
- Rocket: Pegasus XL (F44)
- Launch site: Cape Canaveral Skid Strip, Stargazer
- Contractor: Northrop Grumman
- Entered service: 15 November 2019

End of mission
- Disposal: Contact loss
- Declared: 24 July 2024
- Last contact: 25 November 2022

Orbital parameters
- Reference system: Geocentric orbit
- Regime: Low Earth orbit
- Perigee altitude: 575 km (357 mi)
- Apogee altitude: 603 km (375 mi)
- Inclination: 27.00°
- Period: 97.00 minutes
Instruments
- MIGHTI: Michelson Interferometer for Global High-resolution Thermospheric Imaging
- EUV: Extreme Ultraviolet spectrometer
- FUV: Far Ultraviolet spectrometer
- IVM: Ion Velocity Meter

Ionospheric Connection Explorer (ICON) is a defunct NASA satellite designed to investigate changes in the ionosphere of Earth, the dynamic region high in the atmosphere where terrestrial weather from below meets space weather from above. ICON studied the interaction between Earth's weather systems and space weather driven by the Sun, and how this interaction drives turbulence in the upper atmosphere. NASA hoped that a better understanding of this dynamic would mitigate its effects on communications, GPS signals, and technology in general. It was part of NASA's Explorer program and was operated by University of California, Berkeley's Space Sciences Laboratory.

On 12 April 2013, NASA announced that ICON, along with Global-scale Observations of the Limb and Disk (GOLD), had been selected for development with the cost capped at US$200 million, excluding launch costs. The principal investigator of ICON was Thomas Immel at the University of California, Berkeley.

ICON was originally scheduled to launch in June 2017 and was repeatedly delayed because of problems with its Pegasus XL launch vehicle. It was next due to launch on 26 October 2018 but the launch was rescheduled to 7 November 2018, and postponed again just 28 minutes before launch. ICON was successfully launched on 11 October 2019, at 02:00 UTC.

On 25 November 2022, contact with ICON was unexpectedly lost for unclear reasons. In July 2024, the mission was formally ended after repeated attempts to regain contact with the satellite had failed.

== Overview ==
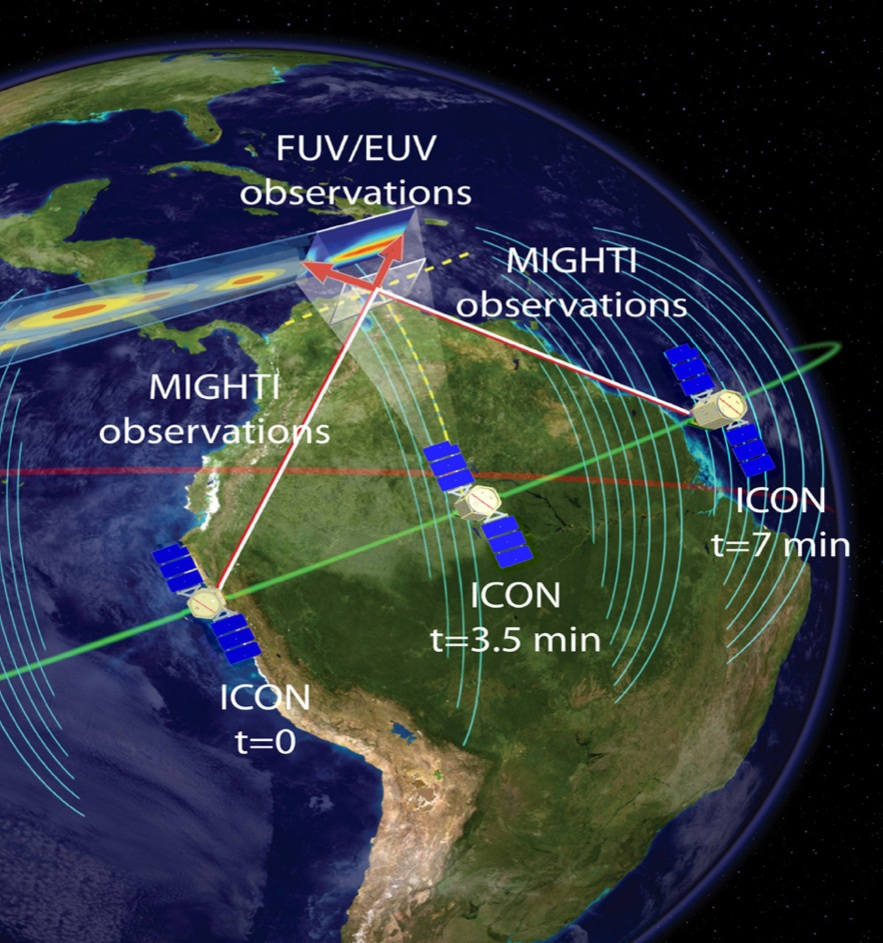
ICON's observational geometry, showing both in-situ and remote sensing of the ionosphere-thermosphere system.

ICON was designed to perform a two-year mission to observe conditions in both the thermosphere and ionosphere. ICON was equipped with four instruments: a Michelson interferometer, built by the United States Naval Research Laboratory (NRL) to measure the winds and temperatures in the thermosphere; an ion drift meter, built by University of Texas at Dallas to measure the motion of charged particles in the ionosphere; and two ultraviolet imagers built at University of California, Berkeley to observe the airglow layers in the upper atmosphere in order to determine both ionospheric and thermospheric density and composition.

Many low-Earth orbiting satellites, including the International Space Station (ISS), fly through the ionosphere and can be affected by its changing electric and magnetic fields. The ionosphere also acts as a conduit for many communications signals, such as radio waves and the signals that make GPS systems work. The ionosphere is where space weather manifests, creating unexpected conditions; electric currents can cause electrical charging of satellites, changing density can affect satellite orbits, and shifting magnetic fields can induce current in power systems, causing strain, disrupting communications and navigation or even triggering blackouts. Improved understanding of this environment can help predict such events and improve satellite safety and design.

== Launch planning ==
Upon initial completion and delivery of the ICON observatory in 2016, launch plans centered around the launch range at Kwajalein Atoll in the Pacific Ocean. ICON was originally scheduled to launch in June 2017, but was repeatedly delayed because of problems with its Pegasus XL launch vehicle. The launch vehicle was mated to its air-launch aircraft Stargazer for a launch attempt in June 2018. This launch was cancelled days before because the rocket showed issues on the first leg of the ferry flight to Kwajalein. Given the availability of the launch range in Cape Canaveral, and a review of the suitability of this site, it was adopted as the ICON launch site. The October 2018 launch from Florida was scheduled after an initial review of the avionics issues. Whereas the delays in 2017 were due to concerns with rocket-payload and fairing separation systems, the 2018 delays were due to noise in the rocket avionics systems. The issues resulted finally in the 2018 Cape Canaveral launch being scrubbed minutes before the scheduled launch. These issues were ultimately resolved and ICON launched from Cape Canaveral on 11 October 2019 at 02:00 UTC. After an approximately month-long commissioning period, ICON began sending back its first science data in November 2019.

== Science payload ==
ICON carried four scientific instruments designed to image even the faintest plasma or airglow to build up a picture of the ionosphere's density, composition and structure. The complete instrument payload manifest had a mass of 130 kg (290 lb) and is listed below:

- Michelson Interferometer for Global High-Resolution Thermospheric Imaging (MIGHTI)
- Ion Velocity Meter (IVM), an ion drift meter
- Extreme Ultra-Violet (EUV), an imager
- Far Ultra-Violet (FUV), an imager

MIGHTI was developed at the United States Naval Research Laboratory (NRL), IVM at the University of Texas, and EUV and FUV were developed at the University of California, Berkeley. MIGHTI measured wind speed and temperature between 90 km (56 mi) and 300 km (190 mi) in altitude. The velocity measurements were gathered by observing the Doppler shift in the red and green lines of atomic oxygen. This was done with the Doppler Asymmetric Spatial Heterodyne (DASH) which used échelle gratings. The temperature measurements were done by photometeric observations with a CCD. MIGHTI was designed to detect wind speeds as low as 16 km/h (9.9 mph), even though the spacecraft was traveling at over 23,000 km/h (14,000 mph) (to stay in orbit).

IVM collected in situ data about ions in the local environment around the spacecraft, whereas EUV and FUV were spectrographic imagers. EUV was a 1-dimension limb imager designed to observe height and density of the daytime ionosphere by detecting the glow of oxygen ions and other species at wavelengths between 55 and 85 nm. FUV was a 2-dimension imager that observes the limb and below at 135 and 155 nm, where bright emissions of atomic oxygen and molecular nitrogen are found.

The solar panel produced 780 watts, but the observatory's power consumption ranged between 209 and 265 watts when in science mode.

== Mission operations ==
Once launched, and for the duration of its two-year science mission, the ICON observatory was controlled and operated by the Mission Operations Center (MOC) at the Space Sciences Laboratory at University of California, Berkeley. ICON was placed into a 27.00° inclination orbit, and communications were facilitated through the Tracking and Data Relay Satellite System (TDRSS), NASA's orbiting communications network. Ground contacts with ICON were performed mainly from the Berkeley Ground Station, an 11 m (36 ft) dish, with backup contacts out of Wallops Flight Facility (WFF), Virginia and Santiago, Chile.

== Loss of contact and failure ==
The NASA ICON team unexpectedly lost contact with the spacecraft on 25 November 2022. A fail-safe system, designed to reset the spacecraft computer after 8 days with no receipt of commands from the ground, failed to restore communications after it elapsed on 5 December 2022. On 24 July 2024, NASA formally declared that the mission had ended. It was concluded there were 3 possible causes of spacecraft failure. A failure of a card in master avionics unit; power bus fault; or a design failure, part failure, or MMOD strike to MAU or power bus parts.

== See also ==
- Explorers Program
