= Colin Bell (academic) =

English sociologist

Colin Bell (1 March 1942 – 24 April 2003) was an English sociologist who served as the Vice-Chancellor for the University of Bradford between 1998 and 2001 and who was later Principal at the University of Stirling. He died suddenly on 24 April 2003 and the University of Bradford now holds an annual memorial lecture in his name discussing widening participation. The University of Stirling named the building currently housing the Department of Social Science after him.

== Life ==
Bell was born in Kent, graduated from the University of Keele and was awarded his postgraduate degree at the University of Wales. He was well known for his internationalism, his opposition to the Iraq War, which began shortly before his death, and his dedication to the cause of making higher education more accessible to students from socially deprived backgrounds.

He married twice: to Jocelyn Mumford in 1964 and later to Janette Webb. He had four children—Rachel and Luke by his first marriage, and two daughters Islay (b. 1989) and Catherine (b. 1992) by his second.

Academic offices
Preceded by David Johns	Vice-Chancellor of the University of Bradford; 1998–2001	Succeeded by Chris Taylor
Preceded by Andrew Miller	Principal and Vice-Chancellor; University of Stirling; 2004 to 2010	Succeeded by Christine Hallett
