= Christine Hallett =

British social scientist, academic administrator

Christine Hallett FRSE
- Born: 4 May 1947 (age 79)
- Occupation: academic
- Known for: first woman Principal of a Scottish Pre-1992 - University of Stirling (2004-2010)

Academic background
- Education: Newnham College, Cambridge

Christine Margaret Hallett, FRSE (born 4 May 1949) is a retired British social scientist, academic administrator, and civil servant.

== Biography ==
Hallett was born on 4 May 1949 to Richard William Hallett and his wife Gwendoline (née Owen). She studied at Newnham College, Cambridge, graduating with a BA in 1970. In 1994 she completed her PhD in social policy from Loughborough University.

She was Professor of Social Policy (1995–2010), and Principal and Vice-Chancellor of the University of Stirling from 2004 to 2010, the first woman to head a Scottish Pre-1992.

She had previously worked at Department of Health and Social Security, and was then an academic at the University of Oxford, Keele University, University of Western Australia, and the University of Leicester.

In 2002, Hallett was elected a Fellow of the Royal Society of Edinburgh (FRSE), Scotland's national academy.

== Selected works ==
- Hallett, Christine (1995). Interagency Coordination in Child Protection: A Case Study. London: Her Majesty's Stationery Office. ISBN 978-0113217892.
- Hallett, Christine, ed. (1996). Women And Social Policy: An Introduction. London: Prentice Hall/Harvester Wheatsheaf in association with SPA Social Policy Association. ISBN 978-0133538892.
- Barry, Monica; Hallett, Christine, eds. (1998). Social Exclusion and Social Work: Issues of Theory, Policy and Practice. Lyme Regis: Russell House Publishing. ISBN 978-1898924326.
- Hallett, Christine; Prout, Alan, eds. (2003). Hearing the voices of children: social policy for a new century. London: Routledge. ISBN 978-0415276412.

Academic offices
Preceded by Colin Bell	Principal and Vice-Chancellor; University of Stirling; 2004 to 2010	Succeeded by Gerry McCormac
