= Scottish Political Archive =

Archive in Stirling Scotland

Coordinates: 56°08′58″N 3°55′31″W

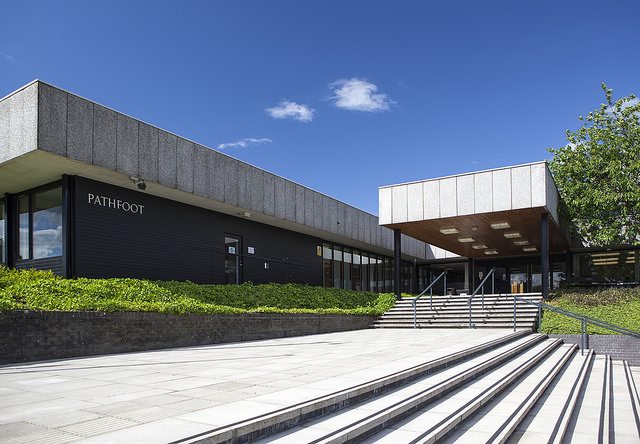
- Pathfoot Building
- Established: 2010
- Location: Pathfoot Building, University of Stirling, Stirling, Scotland, UK
- Type: Archive
- Key holdings: Collections relating to devolution, the campaign for a Scottish Parliament and Independence
- Collections: Canon Kenyon Wright Collection, Bruce Watson Collection
- Website: www.scottishpoliticalarchive.org.uk

The Scottish Political Archive (SPA) is located within the University of Stirling and was founded in 2010. The archive is made up of several collections that focus on the political history of Scotland in the 20th and 21st centuries.

== History ==
The archive was founded in 2010 and has gained a number of collections from Scottish political figures over the years. The purpose of the archive is to preserve political memorabilia, which includes posters, newsletters and leaflets. An important part of the archive is the material it has collected concerning the 1979 and 1997 devolution referendums, and the 2014 Independence Referendum.

The archive has recently gained the Canon Kenyon Wright Collection which they are currently cataloguing.

== Collections ==
- The Scots Independent newspaper photograph Collection
- The George Robertson Collection
- The Bruce Watson Collection
- The Devolution Referendums Oral History Collection
- The SPA Photographic Collection
- The Dennis Canavan Collection
- Federation of Student Nationalists Collection
- The Jack McConnell Collection
- The Bus Party Collection
- Canon Kenyon Wright Collection
