= University of Stirling =

University in Stirling, Scotland

- Type: Public
- Established: 1967; 59 years ago
- Affiliations: Association of Commonwealth Universities; Universities UK
- Endowment: £1.87 million (2022)
- Budget: £155.3 million (2021–22)
- Chancellor: Jack McConnell
- Principal: Gerry McCormac
- Administrative staff: 1,872
- Students: 11,750 (2024/25)
- Undergraduates: 8,700 (2024/25)
- Postgraduates: 3,045 (2024/25)
- Location: Stirling, Scotland, UK; 56°08′45″N 3°55′10″W
- Campus: 360 acres (1.5 km^{2}) parkland campus
- Colours: Heritage green and Energy green
- Website: stir.ac.uk

The University of Stirling (abbreviated as Stir or Shruiglea, in post-nominals; Scottish Gaelic: Oilthigh Sruighlea) is a public university in Stirling, Scotland, founded by a royal charter in 1967. It is located in the Central Belt of Scotland, built within the walled Airthrey Castle estate.

The university campus is approximately 360 acres (145 hectares) in size, incorporating the Stirling University Innovation Park and the Dementia Centre. The campus is located in the foothills of the Ochil Hills. In 2002, the University of Stirling and the landscape of the Airthrey Estate was designated by the International Council on Monuments and Sites as one of the UK's top 20 heritage sites of the 20th century.

As of 2022, the university has 14,000 part-time and full-time students. Stirling has international degree programme partnerships in China with Hebei Normal University, Singapore with Singapore Institute of Management, and Oman. The university offers a MSc in Human Rights & Diplomacy, which is the only Human Rights and Diplomacy programme in the world taught in partnership with the United Nations Institute for Training and Research.

== History ==
Stirling was the first new university to be established in Scotland for nearly 400 years. The original site of the campus was selected from shortlisted competing sites, which include Falkirk, Perth and Inverness. The author of the Robbins Review, which recommended an expansion of the number of universities in the UK during the 1960s, Lord Robbins, was appointed as the university's first chancellor in 1968. In 1967 a house for the university principal Tom Cottrell was completed, designed by architects Morris and Steedman. It was listed as category A in 2009.

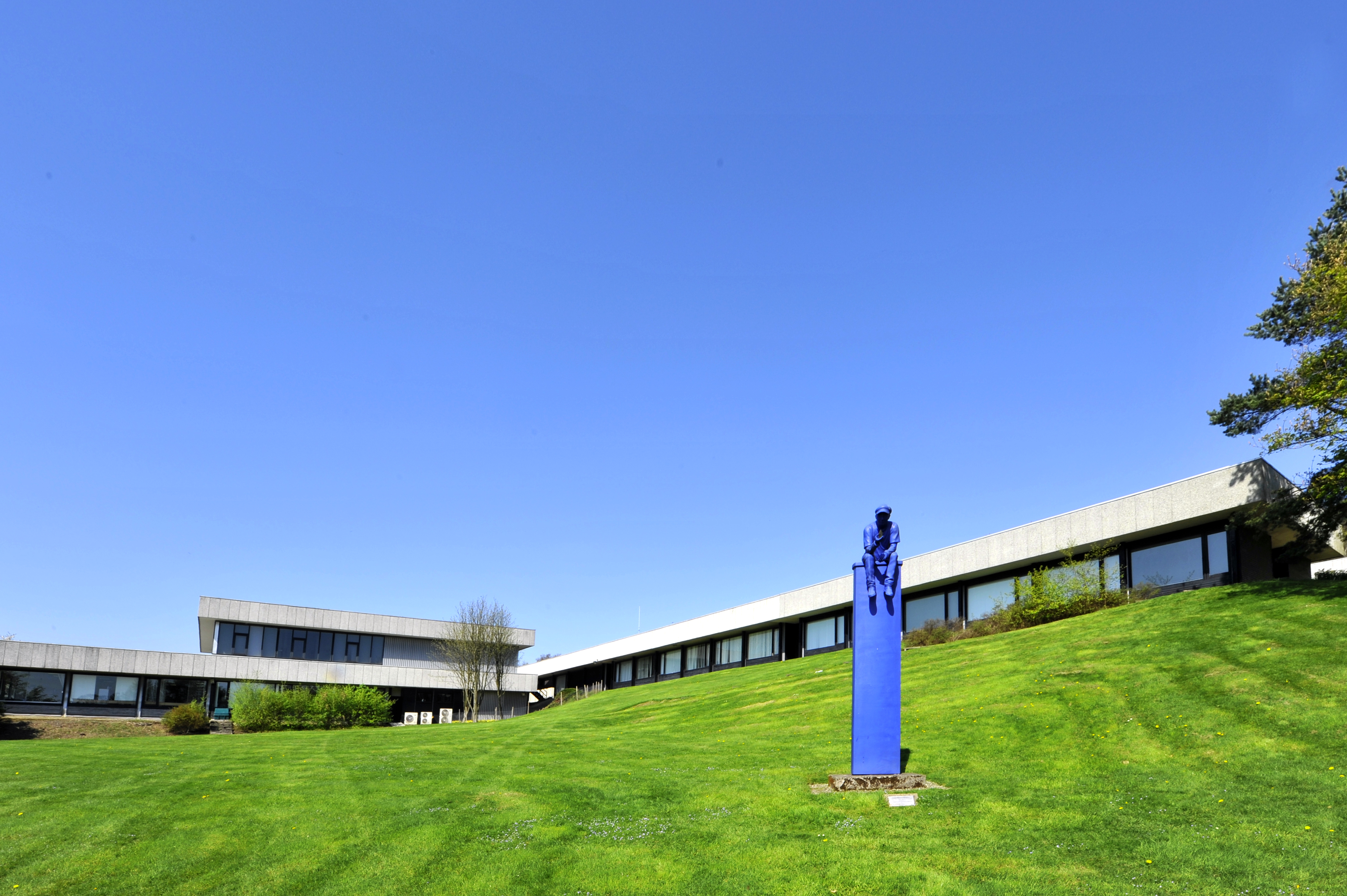
The Pathfoot Building opened in 1967

The Pathfoot Building, which represented the first phase of development on the campus, was completed in 1968 and originally housed lecture theatres, offices and classrooms in addition to the 'crush hall' where the university displayed its emerging collection of contemporary Scottish art. The building was extended in 1979 to include a Tropical Aquarium and again in 1987 to include a Virology Unit associated with the university's Institute of Aquaculture. In 1993, the Pathfoot Building was selected by the international conservation organisation DoCoMoMo as one of sixty key Scottish monuments of the post-war era. It was also voted as one of Prospect's 100 best modern Scottish buildings. In 1970, development began on what was subsequently named the Cottrell Building, in memory of the university's first principal Cottrell. It comprises two parallel buildings with cross link corridors and interspersed courtyard gardens. The building today houses most of the university administration, lecture theatres, departmental offices, classrooms and computer laboratories. The University Library, Atrium and MacRobert Centre are housed in an adjoining building, the Andrew Miller Building, which was completed in 1971.

On 13 October 1972, during a visit to the new campus by HM The Queen, she was subjected to a rowdy reception by booing students, widely reported in the media. The students were protesting about the lack of social spaces in what was at the time a relatively newly built university. On the 14 October 1972 the University Court ordered an immediate investigation into the students’ behaviour. Twenty-four students allegedly involved were charged for the disruption. Jackie McKie was cleared on 15 December 1972. On February 12 1973 students boycotted the ensuing disciplinary trials. When Linda Quinn, the President of the Council of Students’ Association, appealed against her conviction in early March 1973, students organised a mass demonstration to mark the event. Eventually all charges were dropped. Linda Quinn completed her studies at Stirling. There were no further Royal visits until 2011, when Prince Edward formally opened the refurbished library.

A department of Business studies was set up in 1982. The Institute of Aquaculture, a research institute specialising in fish farming and genetics, opened the same year. In 1983 it sold 300 acres of land to Wang Laboratories. The R.G. Bomont Building (named after the second University Secretary), which houses the Faculty of Social Science, was completed in 1998. The Iris Murdoch building was opened in 2002 to house The Dementia Services Development Centre, and the Colin Bell Building was completed in 2003.

== Campus ==
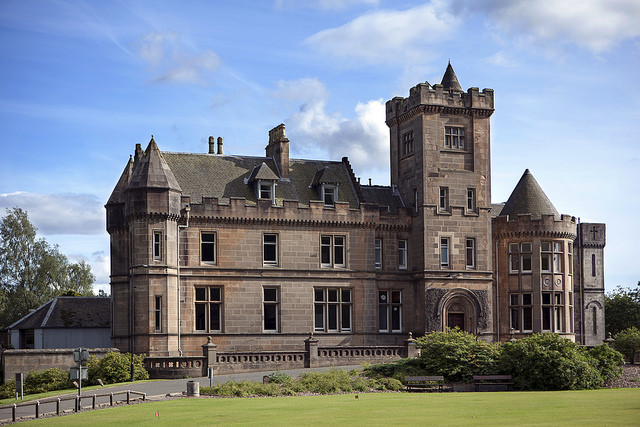
Airthrey Castle

The university campus is set within 330 acres (1.3 km^{2}) of grounds beneath the Ochil Hills, 2 miles (3.2 km) from the centre of Stirling, close to the town of Bridge of Allan. It is regularly described as one of the most beautiful campuses in the world and was ranked 1st in the UK for its campus environment in the International Student Barometer 2016. It is situated on the site of the historic Airthrey estate which includes the Robert Adam-designed 18th-century Airthrey Castle and includes the Hermitage woods, Airthrey Loch, Airthrey Golf Course. The Andrew Miller Building incorporates an Atrium, which contains several retail and food outlets including a bookstore, bank and general store. This building links the Library and Robbins' Centre Students' Union and has connecting bridges to the Cottrell Building, on-campus student residences and the MacRobert Arts Centre.

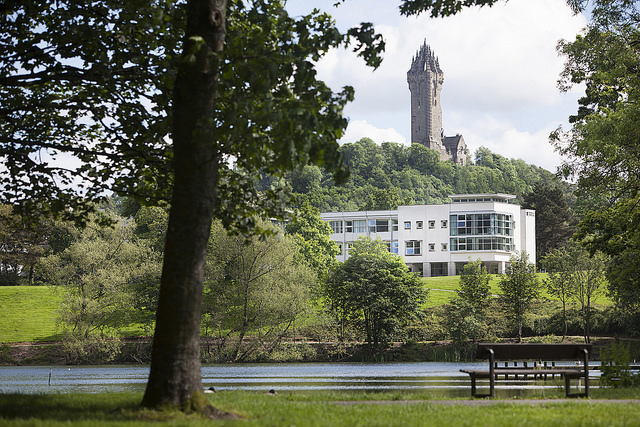
Airthrey Loch, the university's Cottrell Building and the Wallace Monument.

The Library holds over 500,000 volumes and over 9,000 journals. Home to the archives of both the novelist Patrick McGrath and filmmaker Norman McLaren, the Library reopened in August 2010 after a major refurbishment programme. MacRobert Arts Centre is a small theatre and cinema complex open to members of the university community and the general public. The university houses a considerable fine art collection in the Pathfoot Building, comprising over 300 works including paintings, tapestries and sculpture.

The university previously maintained campuses in Inverness and Stornoway, which specialised in Nursing and Midwifery. The Highland site was on the outskirts of Inverness within the grounds of Raigmore Hospital. The Western Isles campus was located in Stornoway and the teaching accommodation was part of the Western Isles Hospital. In 2016, it was announced that the University of Stirling would be transferring delivery of its programmes on these campuses to the University of the Highlands and Islands.

=== Accommodation ===
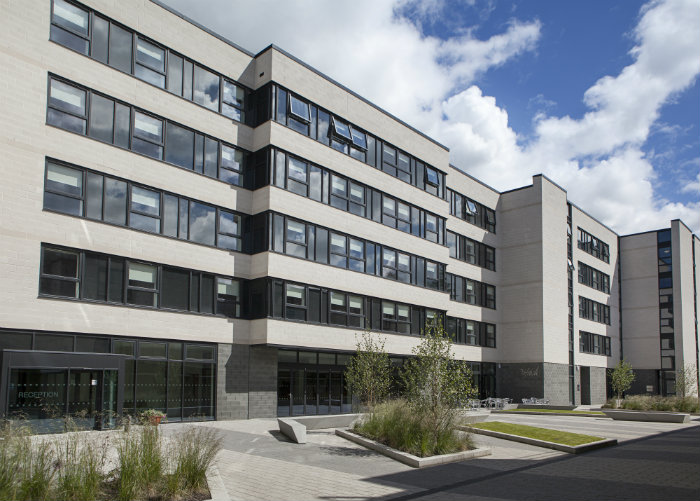
Willow Court, Halls of Residence

The University of Stirling student accommodation can cater for almost 3,000 students in over 20 properties located on and off campus. Most accommodation is in university halls and located on campus. There are town houses at Alexander Court for families and groups of students. Of the 2,000 rooms located on-campus, 800 were built since 2013 as part of a £40M investment programme in student accommodation which was completed in September 2015.

Halls of Residence located on campus include:

- Andrew Stewart Hall
- Willow Court Flats & Studios
- Beech Court Flats & Studios
- Juniper Court Flats & Studios
- Fraser of Allander House
- H H Donnelly House
- Muirhead House
- Polwarth House
- Pendreich Way
- Spittal Hill

Residential buildings located off-campus, within Stirling city centre, include Union Street, Bayne Street, Lyon Crescent, John Forty's Court and Alangrange.

=== Sport facilities ===
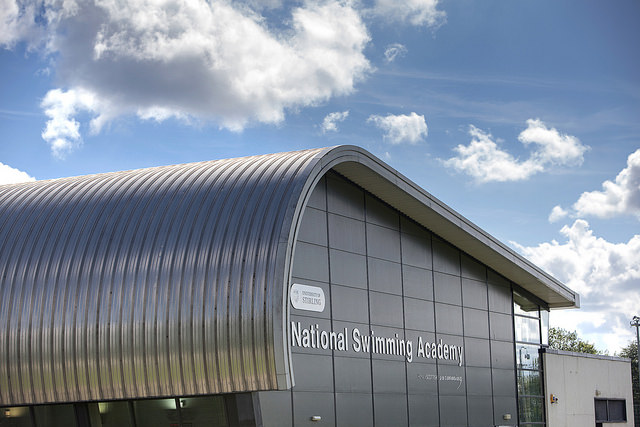
National Swimming Academy

Stirling was designated as Scotland's University for Sporting Excellence by the Scottish Government in 2008. Scholarships are available in five core sports: football, golf, swimming, tennis and triathlon, which allow student athletes to prepare for international competition.

The university has a comprehensive range of sports facilities including a 9-hole Airthrey Golf Course and a 50-metre swimming pool completed in 2001 as part of the National Swimming Academy – a partnership between the university, Scottish Swimming and British Swimming. The sports centre also holds the Gannochy National Tennis Centre, badminton and squash courts, a fitness centre, strength and conditioning centre, sports halls and all-weather playing fields available for students, university staff and the public. The campus is the headquarters for a number of sports agencies including the sportscotland institute of sport, Commonwealth Games Scotland, Scottish Swimming and triathlonscotland.

At Rio 2016, a number of students and alumni from the university competed for Great Britain. Swimmers included Duncan Scott and Robbie Renwick, who both earned silver medals, as well as Commonwealth gold medalist Ross Murdoch.

Top seed tennis player Andy Murray and his brother Jamie Murray trained on the university courts when they were young. Gordon Reid, wheelchair Olympic gold medalist in 2016, was a tennis scholar at the university. The university men's and women's golf teams are consistently ranked among the best in Europe.

The university's most senior football teams compete in the main Scottish league pyramid; the men's team in the regional fifth tier, and the women's team in the second tier. Lower teams compete in the BUCS Football Leagues. In January 2023, the men's football team made history by reaching the 4th round of the Scottish Cup. Losing 1-0 away to Dundee United.

In 2018, the university announced a £20 million transformation of its sports facilities. The project included construction of a new sports centre, which opened in November 2020. The university's new sports centre includes a fitness suite with more than 100 stations, wireless connectivity, three Outrace functional rigs across the new spaces, and new public strength and conditioning area. The University of Stirling is one of the first universities in the UK to install Technogym's new Excite Live range of equipment.

=== International degree partnerships ===
The university has international degree programme partnerships in Singapore, Oman and Vietnam, with the established partnership with British University Vietnam in 2024.

=== Ras al-Khaimah ===
In 2018, the university opened a branch in Ras al-Khaimah which is shared by four other satellite campuses in United Arab Emirates. The campus is not accredited by the local Ministry of Education.

== Organisation and governance ==
In August 2016, the university reorganised into four faculties, the Stirling Management School and the Stirling Graduate School.

- Faculty of Social Sciences
  - Applied Social Sciences
  - Education
- Faculty of Arts and Humanities
  - Communications, Media and Culture
  - History and Politics
  - Law and Philosophy
  - Literature and Languages
  - London Academy of Diplomacy
- Stirling Management School
  - Accounting & Finance
  - Economics
  - Management, Work and Organisation
  - Marketing and Retail
  - Centre for Advanced Management Education
  - Centre for Graduate Research in Management
- Faculty of Natural Sciences
  - Aquaculture
  - Biological and Environmental Sciences
  - Computing Science and Mathematics
  - Psychology
- Faculty of Health Sciences and Sport
  - Sport
  - Health Sciences

=== Governance ===
The statutes of the university are laid out in its royal charter. University Court is the governing body of the university and the Academic Council looks after academic affairs Day-to-day management of the university is undertaken by Gerry McCormac, the University Principal and Vice-Chancellor.

In June 2020, it was announced that Professor McCormac had also been elected to serve as Convener of Universities Scotland by his fellow principals. His two-year term commenced on 1 August 2020, and lasted until 31 July 2022.

The university's Chancellor is Lord Jack McConnell. The university's constitution, academic regulations, and appointments are outlined in the university calendar.

==== Chancellors ====
1. Lord Robbins −1967 to 1978
2. Sir Harold Montague Finniston − 1978 to 1988
3. 8th Lord Balfour of Burleigh, Robert Bruce − 1988 to 1998
4. Dame Diana Rigg − 1998 to 2008
5. James Naughtie − 2008 to 2018
6. Lord Jack McConnell − 2018 to present

==== Principals ====
1. Tom Cottrell – 1967 to 1973 (d. 1973 in office)
2. Sir Frederick Holliday (Acting Principal) – 1973 to 1975 (d. 2016)
3. Sir William Alexander Cramond – 1975 to 1981 (d. 2004)
4. Sir Kenneth (Ken) John Wilson Alexander – 1981 to 1986 (d. 2001)
5. Arthur (John) Forty – 1986 to 1994
6. Andrew Miller − 1994 to 2001
7. Colin Bell − 2001 to 2003 (d. 2003 in office)
8. Christine Hallett − 2005 to 2010
9. Gerry McCormac − 2010 to present

==== University Court ====
The university's governing body is the University Court. It has overall responsibility for the management of the university's resources, the ongoing strategic direction of the university and the approval of major developments. The Court meets four times over the course of the academic year. The current Chair of Court is Hamish Grossart.

==== Academic Council ====
Academic Council is the body responsible for the management of academic affairs, awarding of all degrees, and for the regulation and superintendence of the education, discipline and welfare of the students of the university. The Council consists of various academics and is chaired by the Principal of the university.

== Academic profile ==
=== Teaching ===
Most Scottish degree programmes are designed to include four years of study with the intention of providing a broad and flexible education. Stirling has offered four-year, modular degree programmes since the university was first founded. In the 1960s and 1970s Credit Accumulation and Transfer Schemes, which create flexible pathways for students to acquire qualifications, were predominantly used in the US with the UK system operating on a disciplinary progression model. Initially, Stirling's modular approach, and its inherent flexibility, was seen as novel in the UK, but through time, more institutions moved to a semester basis and today almost all universities operate in this way.

Teaching at Stirling is delivered on a two-semester basis with the academic year beginning in mid-September and the first semester ending in mid-December. The second semester runs from the beginning of January to the end of May each year. At undergraduate level, three modules are taken in the first semester and three in the second. The basic module of study at Stirling is assigned 20 Scottish Credit and Qualifications Framework (SCQF) credit points. Ordinary degrees have a minimum credit total of 360 points.

The university offers a wide range of undergraduate and postgraduate courses covering the liberal arts, natural science, management school and health science. Stirling achieved a 5 Star Excellence Award for Teaching by QS Stars in 2016.

=== Research ===
Stirling is an interdisciplinary research-intensive University with a range of research activity focused on Health and Wellbeing; Culture and Society; Environment; Enterprise and the Economy; and Sport. The Research Excellence Framework also rated almost three-quarters of research activity either world-leading or internationally excellent.

The university is home to some specialist research centres:

- Centre for Environment, Heritage and Policy
- Stirling Media Research Institute (SMRI)
- Stirling Centre for Scottish Studies.
- Dementia Services Development Centre
- Centre for Gender and Feminist Studies
- Centre for Transnational Legal Methods
- Stirling Environment and Energy Network
- Centre of Postcolonial Studies
- Stirling Centre for International Publishing and Communication
- Contemporary Portuguese Political History Research Centre
- Stirling Centre for Translation, Interpreting and Intercultural Studies
- Centre for Policy, Conflict and Co-Operation
- Scottish Law and Innovation Network (SCOTLIN)

Stirling has a research publications database, STORRE, which is a source of free, full-text access research outputs.

=== Business links ===
The university has major industrial research links through Stirling University Innovation Park. This large science park was founded in 1993 and is located adjacent to the main university campus. It is home to around 50 companies engaging in various forms of research and development. During the 1990s the university built a stand-alone Management Centre on the campus. This developed over time into a Conference Centre with residential accommodation. In 2015, the Management Centre was rebranded the Stirling Court Hotel.

=== Reputation and rankings ===
Rankings
National rankings
- Complete (2027): 55
- Guardian (2027): 92
- Times / Sunday Times (2027): 37

Global rankings
- ARWU (2026): 801–900
- QS (2027): 560=
- THE (2026): 501–600

Stirling is a mid-ranked, pre-1992 UK university with a reputation for high teaching quality and socially relevant research. It is among the top 50 universities in the world that are under 50 years old – 2nd in the UK and 46th in the world, according to the Times Higher Education World University Rankings, and among the top 40 in the UK in the Complete University Guide.

The university is ranked 1st in Scotland and 3rd in the UK for graduate employability according to the Higher Education Statistics Agency, with more than 96% of graduates in employment, or further study, within six months of graduating.

In 2016 the University of Stirling achieved 5 stars in the QS World University Rankings in five categories – "Teaching", "Employability", "Facilities", "Inclusiveness" and "Internationalisation". In The Complete University Guide 2017, Stirling was ranked 1st in the UK for Social Work, 2nd in Scotland for Communication and Media Studies, and 2nd in Scotland for Marketing.

The University of Stirling was ranked 5th in Scotland and 40th in the UK for research intensity in the 2014 assessment of research in the UK, the Research Excellence Framework. The university was one of the twenty institutions to be awarded a Queen's Anniversary prize in 2014 – the prize for Higher and Further Education for ground-breaking research, recognising work led by the Institute of Social Marketing into the effects of tobacco, alcohol and food marketing on the health of young people. In March 2016, the University of Stirling Management School was accredited by the Association of MBAs (AMBA) for its MBA and MBM programmes.

== Student life ==
=== Students' Union ===
The University of Stirling Students' Union is based in the university's Robbins Centre Students' Union on campus and is affiliated to the National Union of Students. The union provides students with entertainment, welfare and information services and represents students interests to a range of organisations, including the university. Senior members of the union are entitled to seats on the University Court. The union supports more than 90 clubs and societies. The Sports Union supports 53 sports clubs. The university has student-run media services. Brig has been the campus newspaper since 1969. Air3 Radio was the first campus radio station in Scotland (previously URA – University Radio Airthrey), and AirTV (formerly Videoworks) is a television station for students, set up in 2002.

The Students' Union is governed by a board of trustees as well as a Chief Executive. The four sabbatical officers of the SU are the Union President, Sports President, Vice-President Education and Vice-President Communities. Alongside these full-time, paid officers are numerous part-time volunteer executive officers.

On 14 November 2022, the student union voted to transition to 100% plant-based catering and all vegan meals within three years. The student union's three cafes will serve menus that are half vegan in 2023–2024 academic year and be fully vegan by 2025. The transition was initiated by the student chapter of Plant-Based Universities. Animal-based agricultural groups on campus criticised the move and student activists faced personal abuse at their homes.

== Notable academics and alumni ==
=== Academics ===
- David W. Bebbington, Professor of History
- David Blanchflower, Professor of Economics, former Monetary Policy Committee Member
- A. Norman Jeffares, Emeritus Professor of English. Previously University of Leeds, University of Adelaide, University of Edinburgh, and University of Groningen.
- Norman Longworth, honorary Professor of Lifelong Learning
- Norman MacCaig, reader in poetry
- Ivana Markova, Emeritus Professor of Psychology
- Gerry McCormac, Principal and Professor of Physics
- Jean Redpath, (honorary staff) folk singer
- Stewart Sutherland, former lecturer, later Baron Sutherland of Houndwood
- Herbert Wilson, Emeritus Professor of Physics
- Waswa Balunywa, Ugandan Academic and Principal of Makerere University Business School (MUBS)

=== Alumni ===
Academia and science
- Lizelle Bisschoff, Professor in Film Studies at the University of Glasgow and founder of the Africa in Motion (AiM) film festival in Scotland
- Joseph Bristow, university professor, literary scholar at University of California, Los Angeles
- Muffy Calder, Chief Scientific Advisor to the Scottish Government
- Andy Clark, Professor of Cognitive Philosophy at the University of Sussex. Previously University of Edinburgh, Indiana University Bloomington, and Washington University in St. Louis.
- Jonathon Fletcher, father of the search engine, developer of JumpStation
- Dario Floreano, Italian scientist at École Polytechnique Fédérale de Lausanne
- Chris Lilley, W3C internet architect
- Kathleen Taylor, biologist at University of Oxford

Arts and media

- Iain Banks, author
- Alan Bissett, writer
- Jonathan Clements, author
- Mark Cousins, film critic
- Grace Dent, journalist, reporter, author and television critic
- Hamish Hamilton, music and events director
- Jackie Kay, poet and writer
- Nick Keir, musician
- Derek Lambie, journalist, editor Scottish Sunday Express
- Paul Lewis, presenter, BBC Radio 4 Money Box
- Ally McCrae, radio presenter
- Greg McHugh, actor, writer
- Rhona McLeod, Scottish broadcaster
- Fiona Ritchie, radio presenter

Politics

- Gordon Banks, former Labour MP
- Hannah Bardell, former SNP MP for Livingston
- Scott Barrie, former Labour MSP
- Bill Butler, former Labour MSP
- Michael Connarty, former MP for Falkirk East
- Angela Constance, SNP politician
- Angela Crawley, SNP politician
- Kenneth Gibson, SNP MSP
- Neil Gray, SNP MP for Airdrie and Shotts
- Paul Grice, Clerk and chief executive, Scottish Parliament
- Eric Joyce, former Labour MP for Falkirk
- Daniel Kawczynski, Conservative MP
- Khoo Kheng-Hor, Malaysian politician
- Richard Lochhead, SNP MSP
- Árni Mathiesen, Icelandic politician
- Paul Monaghan, SNP politician
- Jack McConnell, former First Minister of Scotland
- Steven Paterson, former SNP MP for Stirling
- John Reid, MP, former Home Secretary
- Mark Ruskell, Green Party MSP
- Winston Set Aung, politician, economist and management consultant, incumbent Deputy Governor of the Central Bank of Myanmar
- Tommy Sheridan, Leader of Solidarity, former MSP
- Shirley-Anne Somerville, SNP MSP
- Paul Sweeney, Labour and Co-operative MP
- Stephen Kerr, Conservative MP for Stirling
- Euan Stainbank, Labour MP for Falkirk

Sport

- Craig Benson, swimmer, double Olympian
- Frankie Brown, female Scottish footballer
- Todd Cooper, swimmer, Double Olympian
- Scott Duncan, professional tennis player
- Sir Alex Ferguson, former manager of Manchester United
- Colin Fleming, professional tennis player, winner of a Mixed Doubles gold medal at the 2010 Commonwealth Games
- Sir Bill Gammell, Scotland rugby international and businessman
- Charlotte Henshaw, Paralympic swimmer
- Andrew Hunter, Olympic and Commonwealth swimmer
- Shelley Kerr, first female manager in British men's football and appointed Scotland national women's football team coach
- Ameer Lani, football manager, Brunei national team
- Catriona Matthew, professional golfer, winner of the 2009 British Women's Open
- Eachainn Miller, Western Isles representative football team player
- Catriona Morrison, triathlete and winner of the 2010 World Duathlon
- Angela Mudge, former world champion hill runner
- Ross Murdoch, swimmer, World, European and Commonwealth Champion
- David O'Brien, swimmer, Olympic Finalist
- Richie Ramsay, professional golfer, winner of the 2006 U.S. Amateur
- Jane Ross, Scottish Internationalist footballer
- Duncan Scott, swimmer, Eight time Olympic Medallist, Double Olympic Champion, World, European and Commonwealth Champion
- Gordon Sherry, professional golfer
- Colin Turkington, professional racing driver, four-time British Touring Car Championship champion

Other

- Neil Brailsford QC, Senator of the College of Justice
- Alison Brittain, chief executive of Whitbread
- Neil Davidson, Baron Davidson of Glen Clova, QC, Solicitor General for Scotland 2000–01, Advocate General for Scotland 2006–2010, life peer
- Bill Gammell, Scottish businessman
- Neal Hazel, criminologist, former Deputy Chief Inspector of Probation for England and Wales
- Sam Mort, UNICEF chief of communications Afghanistan
- Julian Roberts, chief executive of Old Mutual

== See also ==
- Armorial of UK universities
- List of universities in the United Kingdom
- Scottish Aquaculture Innovation Centre
- Scottish Political Archive
