= Tom Cottrell =

Scottish chemist

Prof Tom Leadbetter Cottrell DSc FRSE (8 June 1923 – 2 June 1973) was an influential Scottish chemist. He is best remembered as a co-founder and first Principal of the University of Stirling, and founder of the Macrobert Arts Centre in Stirling. He wrote several popular academic textbooks on the subject of chemistry.

== Life ==
He was born in Edinburgh on 8 June 1923, the son of Lily and Allin Cottrell, a lecturer in chemistry at the University of Edinburgh. He attended George Watson’s College and then studied chemistry at the University of Edinburgh, graduating with a B.Sc. in 1943.

From 1943 he worked at the Nobel Division of ICI, based at Ardeer working on the manufacture of explosives. He worked here until 1959. In 1952 he was awarded the Meldola Medal by the Institute of Chemistry.

From 1959 until 1965 he was Professor of Chemistry at the University of Edinburgh. Following the award of a D.Sc. from the university in 1958, he was elected a Fellow of the Royal Society of Edinburgh in 1960, his proposers including James Kendall and Mowbray Ritchie. From 1965 he became involved in the creation of the University of Stirling both physically and in terms of creating its administrative structure. The university was sited in open countryside, just north of Stirling, and was one of the wave of purpose-built modern universities being created across Britain in the late 20th century. It centred on Airthrey Castle but this was too small to serve as much more than simply a focal point within the university. Cottrell’s office in these years was in the Garden Cottage of the castle’s estate.

He was also an enthusiastic sailor, racing a Dragon Class yacht (Vodka) on the Firth of Forth at Granton at the Royal Forth Yacht Club, and later (Cressid) on the Clyde.

In 1967, on completion of the essential core buildings of the university, he became the first Principal and Vice-Chancellor of the University of Stirling and immediately began promoting the arts at the university. This included the creation of the highly forward-looking Macrobert Arts Centre, on the east side of the university campus.

Outside his academic interests, Cottrell was an appreciator of fine art and established a substantial collection of Scottish art for the university, beginning with the acquisition of 14 paintings by John Duncan Fergusson from his widow, Margaret Morris. The collection expanded to include works by John Bellany, Anne Redpath, Joan Eardley, Elizabeth Blackadder, Eduardo Paolozzi.

He died of a heart attack, at home in Stirling on 2 June 1973, aged 49.

== Publications ==
- The Strengths of Chemical Bonds (1958)
- Molecular Energy Transfer in Gases (1961)
- Chemistry (1963)
- Dynamic Aspects of Molecular Energy States (1965)

== Family ==
He married Marie Findlay (1924–2014) in 1950 and had two sons, Allin and John.
