= Air3 Radio =

Coordinates: 56.1455°N 3.9195°W

- Stirling; Scotland

Programming
- Format: Student radio

Ownership
- Owner: University of Stirling

History
- First air date: 1972

Links
- Website: www.air3radio.co.uk

Air3 Radio is the student radio station of the University of Stirling. Air3 Radio broadcasts a full schedule during normal semester dates (September - December and February - May) and a limited number of shows during holiday and exam periods.

The station currently has shows running from 07:00 - 03:00, 7 days a week.

== History ==
University Radio Airthrey (URA) was set up in the early 1970s as Scotland's first campus-based student radio station. The station was rebranded as Air3 1350 in 2001 after they received their AM radio transmitter, and most recently Air3 Radio reflecting the change in technology and broadcasting technique. The student radio station was a highly recommended club for University of Stirling Students. However, once the COVID-19 pandemic began, memberships were in short supply. In May 2022, a new committee started to revitalise the society from the ground up in its first redevelopment since 2009, and, as of 2026, the station's membership numbers have grown to almost 50.

== Committee ==
Air3 Radio is made up of almost 170 members and contributors. Throughout the year, they present shows, produce live broadcasts and sessions, interview bands, and create features to educate and inform the public and students alike.

There is a strong music team that handles all aspects of label communication and processes, reviews, and playlists, and provides feedback to musicians, both signed and unsigned, from all over the world.

In keeping with the University of Stirling Student Union Constitution, the Air3 Radio Society is run by an elected committee.

The 2023-2025 station manager was Maisie Mackay Smith. The 2025-current station manager is Millie-Ann McMinn.

== Past members ==
Many members of Air3 have gone on to have successful careers within radio and the wider creative media industries, including:

- Greg McHugh – Gary: Tank Commander (TV Show)
- Ally McCrae – Former BBC Radio 1 - Nations programming
- Michael Hines – Director of Still Game

== See also ==
- Student Radio Association
