= Macrobert Arts Centre =

Arts venue in Stirling, Scotland

Coordinates: 56°8′44″N 3°55′21″W

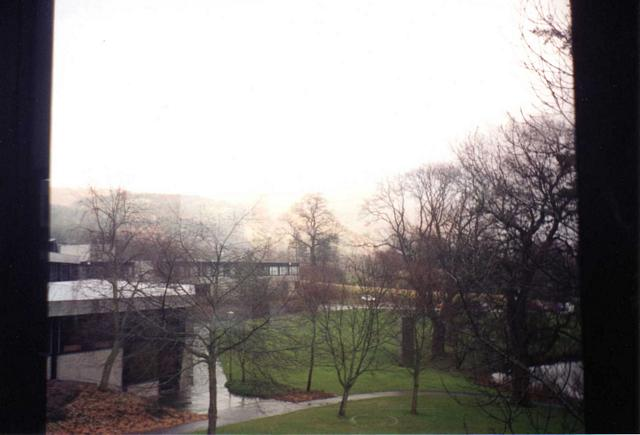
An image of Macrobert Arts Centre

Macrobert Arts Centre is a multi-arts venue located on the main campus of the University of Stirling, Scotland. The Arts Centre offers a varied programme of events and experiences – cinema, comedy, dance, exhibitions, family, get involved, music, opera and theatre – catering for audiences from across Stirling, the Forth Valley and beyond. It was originally opened in 1971 as Scotland's first purpose-built arts centre, the brainchild of the university's first principal, Tom Cottrell FRSE, who wanted appreciation of the arts to be at the heart of the university's cultural ethos.

In October 2002 the Arts Centre re-opened following a period of refurbishment by Appleton Architects and Buro Happold.

Macrobert Arts Centre is a registered charity under Scottish law. It receives key funding from Creative Scotland and the University of Stirling, while raising 70% of its required funds through ticket sales and donations, grants and sponsorship.
