= Galactic Emission Mapping =

Astronomical survey

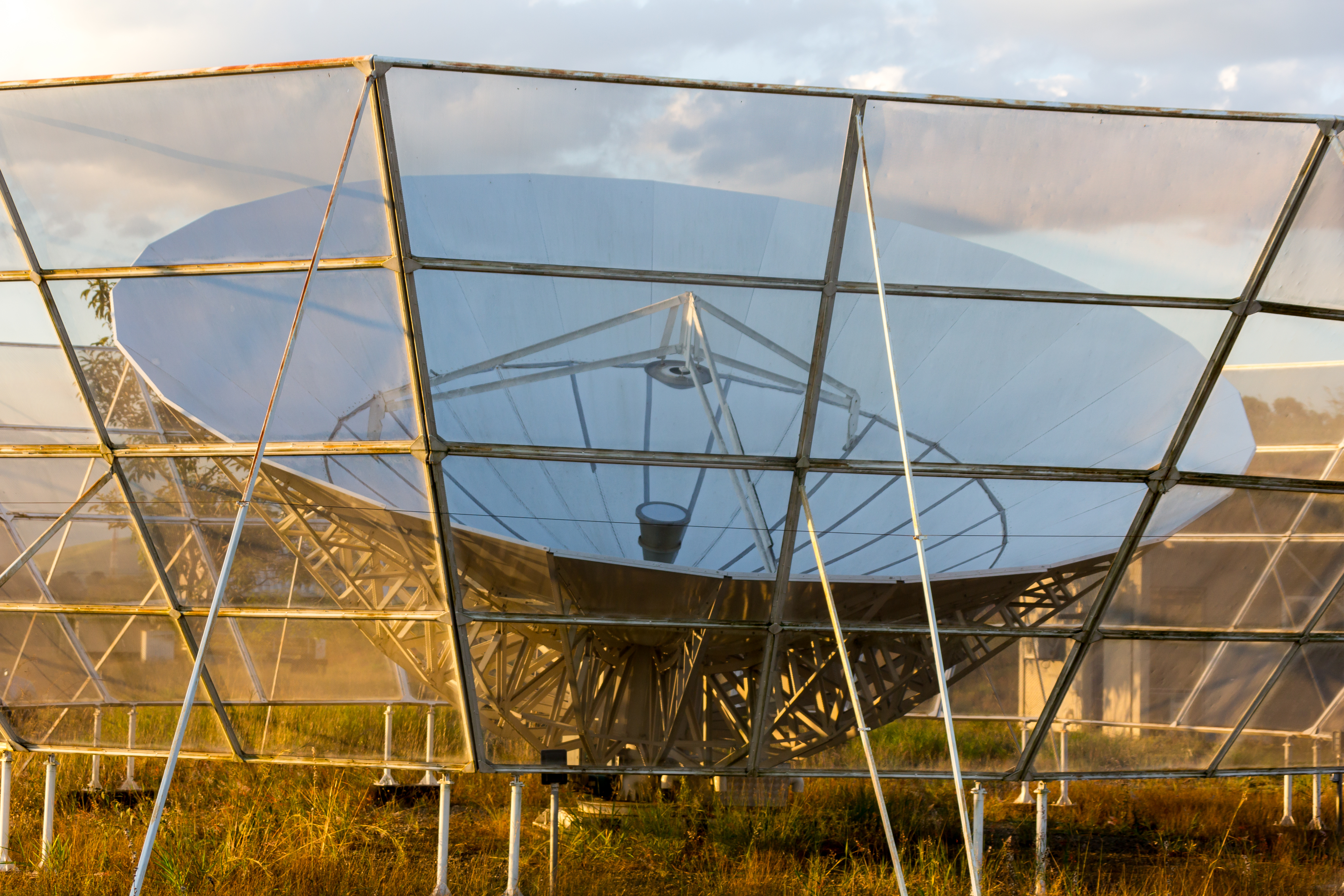
- The GEM telescope in Cachoeira Paulista, Brazil
- Alternative names: GEM

GEM Radio Telescope in Brasil
- Location(s): Brazil
- Altitude: 570 m (1,870 ft)
- Wavelength: 3 cm (10.0 GHz)–74 cm (410 MHz)
- Diameter: 5.5 m (18 ft 1 in)
- Related media on Commons

GEM Radio Telescope in Portugal
- Location(s): Pampilhosa da Serra, Coimbra District, Portugal
- Altitude: 800 m (2,600 ft)
- Diameter: 9 m (29 ft 6 in)

The Galactic Emission Mapping survey (GEM) is an international project with the goal of making a precise map of the electromagnetic spectrum of our galaxy at low frequencies (radio and microwaves).

== Description of the project ==
The GEM Radio Telescope measures the radio emission of our galaxy in five frequencies, between 408 MHz and 10 GHz, from different places of the earth. This data will be used to calibrate other telescopes, more specifically the Planck Surveyor, and will give the means to filter the Cyclotron Radiation and the free–free radiation from other maps in a way that the only radiation left on the map is the Cosmic Microwave Background.

The telescope is in construction at Pampilhosa da Serra, Portugal, but the receptor has already made measurements in Cachoeira Paulista, (Brazil), in Antártica, in Bishop (U.S.), Villa de Leyva (Colombia) and in Tenerife (Canary Islands). The main reflector has a parabolic form of 5.5 m of diameter.

The telescope was projected and is operated by an international collaboration coordinated by the University of California, Berkeley and by the Lawrence Berkeley National Laboratory, under the guidance of George Smoot, awarded with the Nobel Prize in Physics in 2006.

In Brazil, the radio telescope is under the responsibility of the Instituto Nacional de Pesquisas Espaciais (National Institute of Space Research) and counts with the participation of the Astrophysics group of the Universidade Federal de Itajubá (Itajubá Federal University). Portugal joined the project in 2005 through the Instituto de Telecomunicações of Aveiro (Telecommunications institute of Aveiro), who is responsible for the planning and construction of the radio telescope.

=== GEM in Portugal ===
==== Scanning Process ====
In Portugal the radio telescope will perform scans by rotating on its base at a speed greater than one rotation per minute, therefore avoiding the error fluctuations caused by water vapour in the atmosphere. This scanning process will provide an important contribution to the data processing.

==== Telescope ====
A Ground Shield will be built to avoid signal contamination with thermal radiation that may come from below the horizon, to reflect side lobes to the sky and to reduce the noise originating from diffraction from the edges of the reflector to the receiver. This will be made possible by an aluminium grid surrounding the radio telescope, which is 10 meters wide but only 8 meters high because it will be inclined towards the exterior.

The edges will be curved with a radius larger than ¼ of the wavelength so that diffraction is reduced.

==== Localization ====
The antenna is located at Pampilhosa da Serra at an altitude of 800m above sea level. This location was chosen because it is surrounded by a mountain range which peaks at about 1000m above sea level, which give a natural "shielding" from the electromagnetic noise of the neighboring cities.

The same reason that made this location a good choice also created additional problems, since many of the necessary infrastructures had to be prepared and installed. The Telescope foundations were studied by the Département of Civil Engineering of the Universidade de Aveiro and the city hall of Pampilhosa da Serra offered 120 tons of concrete. A new connection to the electric grid was made taking into account the size of the transformer to avoid noise in the observed frequencies. This was necessary because the wavelength of the emitted radiation is close to size of the transformer. A small meteorologic station was also installed to measure the wind intensity and help prevent against wind damages on the telescope.

A second telescope is planned on the same site, to study solar phenomena.
