= Dynamics Explorer 1 =

NASA satellite of the Explorer program

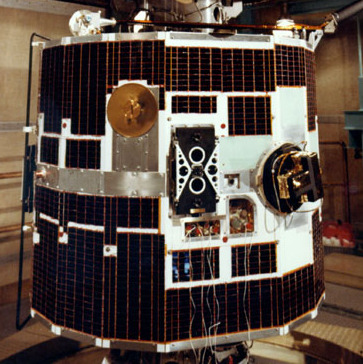
- Names: Explorer 62; DE-A; Dynamics Explorer-A
- Mission type: Space physics
- Operator: NASA
- COSPAR ID: 1981-070A
- SATCAT no.: 12624
- Mission duration: 1 year (planned); 10 years (achieved)

Spacecraft properties
- Spacecraft: Explorer LXII
- Spacecraft type: Dynamics Explorer
- Bus: DE
- Manufacturer: Goddard Space Flight Center
- Launch mass: 424 kg (935 lb)
- Dimensions: 137 cm (54 in) in diameter and 115 cm (45 in) high
- Power: 86 watts

Start of mission
- Launch date: 3 August 1981, 09:56 UTC
- Rocket: Thor-Delta 3913 (Thor 642 / Delta 155)
- Launch site: Vandenberg, SLC-2W
- Contractor: Douglas Aircraft Company
- Entered service: 3 August 1981

End of mission
- Deactivated: 28 February 1991
- Last contact: 28 February 1991

Orbital parameters
- Reference system: Geocentric orbit
- Regime: Highly elliptical orbit
- Perigee altitude: 567.60 km (352.69 mi)
- Apogee altitude: 23,289.00 km (14,471.11 mi)
- Inclination: 89.90°
- Period: 409.00 minutes

Instruments
- Auroral Physics Theory; Controlled and Naturally Occurring Wave Particle Interactions Theory; Energetic Ion Composition Spectrometer (EICS); High Altitude Plasma Instrument (HAPI); Magnetic Field Observations Triaxial Fluxgate Magnetometer (MAG-A); Plasma Waves Instrument (PWI); Retarding Ion Mass Spectrometer (RIMS); Spin Scan Auroral Imager (SAI)

Dynamics Explorer 1 (DE-1 or Explorer 62) was a NASA high-altitude mission. It was launched on 3 August 1981, and terminated on 28 February 1991. It consisted of two satellites, DE-1 and DE-2, whose purpose was to investigate the interactions between plasmas in the magnetosphere and those in the ionosphere. The two satellites were launched together into polar coplanar orbits, which allowed them to simultaneously observe the upper and lower parts of the atmosphere.

== Mission ==
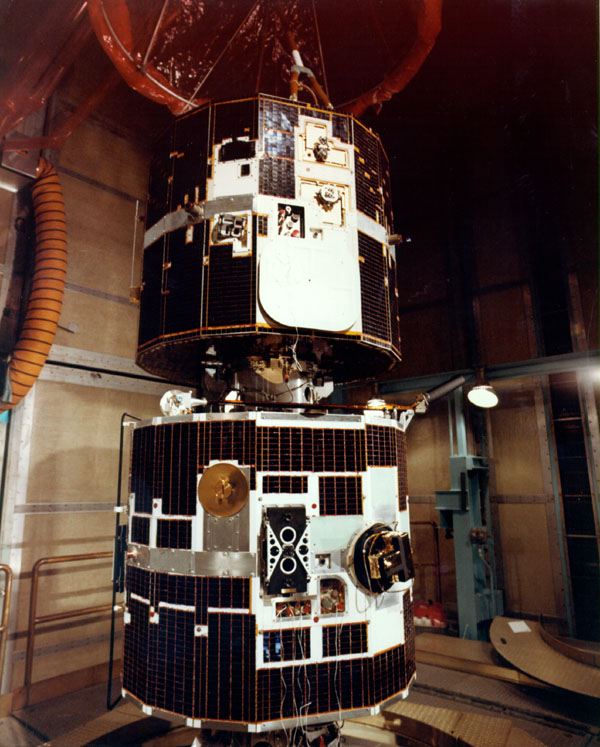
Dynamics Explorer 1 (Explorer 62) in the bottom and Dynamics Explorer 2 (Explorer 63) in the top

The Dynamics Explorer mission's general objective is to investigate the strong interactive processes coupling the hot, tenuous, convecting plasmas of the magnetosphere and the cooler, denser plasmas and gases corotating in the Earth's ionosphere, upper atmosphere, and plasmasphere. Two satellites, DE-1 and DE-2, were launched together and were placed in polar coplanar orbits, permitting simultaneous measurements at high and low altitudes in the same field-line region. The DE-1 spacecraft (high-altitude mission) uses an elliptical orbit selected to allow: (1) measurements extending from the hot magnetospheric plasma through the plasmasphere to the cool ionosphere; (2) global auroral imaging, wave measurements in the heart of the magnetosphere, and crossing of auroral field lines at several Earth radii; and (3) measurements for significant periods along a magnetic field flux tube.

== Spacecraft ==
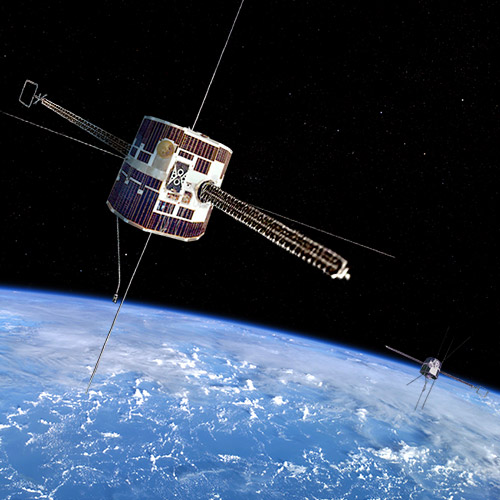
Artist rendering of the Dynamics Explorer 1 satellite

The spacecraft approximated a short polygon 137 cm (54 in) in diameter and 115 cm (45 in) high. The antennas in the X-Y plane measured 200 m (660 ft) tip-to-tip, and on the Z-axis are 9 m (30 ft) tip-to-tip. Two 6 m (20 ft) booms are provided for remote measurements. Power is supplied by a solar cell array, mounted on the side and end panels. The spacecraft is spin-stabilized, with the spin axis normal to the orbital plane, and the spin rate at 10 ± 0.1 rpm. A pulse-code modulation (PCM) telemetry data system is used that operates in real-time or in a tape recorder mode. Data have been acquired on a science-problem-oriented basis, with closely coordinated operations of the various instruments, both satellites and supportive experiments. Data acquired from the instruments are temporarily stored on tape recorders before transmission at an 8:1 playback-to-record ratio. Additional operational flexibility allows a playback-to-record ratio of 4:1. The primary data rate is 16,384 bits per second. Since commands are stored in a command memory unit, spacecraft operations are not real-time, except for the transmission of the wideband analog data from the Plasma Wave Instrument (1981-070A-02). On 22 October 1990, the science operations were terminated. On 28 February 1991, Dynamics Explorer 1 operations were officially terminated.

== Experiments ==
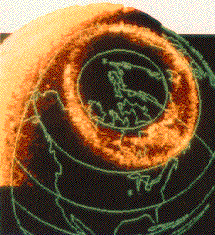
An aurora as seen by the Spin Scan Auroral Imager on Dynamics Explorer 1

=== Auroral Physics Theory ===
The primary goal of this investigation was to use the results from other experiments, particularly 1981-070A-03, to test theoretical models and to develop new ones, with emphasis on research areas related to auroral arcs, field-aligned currents, plasma wave turbulence associated with anomalous resistance, generation of auroral electron beams, production of kilometric and VLF hiss radiation. In addition, correlation studies were organized by selecting events that were interesting to the various investigators, and data reduction procedures were suggested to facilitate comparison and interpretation of the data.

=== Controlled and Naturally Occurring Wave Particle Interactions Theory ===
This investigation used a ground-based very-low-frequency/low-frequency (VLF/LF) (0.5–200 kHz) transmitter located at Siple Station, Antarctica, at an L value of about 4, and the broad-band magnetic field detector from experiment 1981-070A-02. The primary objective of the investigation was to determine the relationship between VLF/LF waves and energetic electrons in the magnetosphere, with emphasis on wave growth, stimulated emissions, and wave-induced perturbations of the energetic electrons. Other objectives were: (1) to determine how wave propagation from both ground and magnetospheric sources was affected by field-aligned plasma structures such as the plasmapause and ducts of enhanced ionization, (2) to use the wave data to describe the structure of the plasmapause and the distribution of ionization along field-aligned ducts, and (3) to study the effects of Earth power-line radiation and other VLF wave activity. The spacecraft instrumentation for this experiment consisted of the Linear Wave Receiver (LWR) provided by the Plasma Wave Instrument (1981-070A-02). The LWR provided a waveform output with a 30-dB linear amplitude response for bands of 1.5-3.0, 3.11 ± 7.5%, 3–6, or 10–16 kHz for a selected magnetic or electric sensor. This receiver was used to measure growth rates for waves stimulated by the Siple station VLF transmitter or by natural wave phenomena.

=== Energetic Ion Composition Spectrometer (EICS) ===
The Energetic Ion Composition Spectrometer (EICS) had high sensitivity and high resolution and covered the energy range from 0 to 17 keV per unit charge and the mass range from less than 1 to greater than 150 u/Q. This investigation provided data used in investigating the strong coupling mechanism between the magnetosphere and the ionosphere that results in large fluxes of energetic O+ ions being accelerated from the ionosphere and injected into the magnetosphere during magnetic storms. The properties of the minor ionic species such as He+ and He++ relative to the major constituents of the energetic magnetosphere plasma were also studied in order to evaluate the relative importance of the different sources of the plasma and of various energization, transport, and loss processes that may be mass-or charge-dependent. One of the primary objectives was to measure the energy and pitch angle distributions of the principal mass constituents (O+ and H+) of the upward-flowing ions from the auroral acceleration region. An important area for study was the cusp region. The instrument was similar to one flown on the ISEE-1 satellite and consisted of a curved plate electrostatic energy analyzer, followed by a combined cylindrical electrostatic-magnetic mass analyzer. Open electron multipliers were used with pulse-amplitude discrimination as the mass analyzer detectors in order to improve the mass separation characteristics of the spectrometer. The energy resolution, (delta E)/E (internal), was 5%. The mass resolution M/(delta M) was less than or equal to 10 on the focus line. Time resolution was 32 samples per second.

=== High Altitude Plasma Instrument (HAPI) ===
The High Altitude Plasma Instrument (HAPI) consisted of an array of five electrostatic analyzers capable of making measurements of the phase-space distributions of electrons and positive ions in the energy/charge range from 5 eV to 32 keV as a function of pitch angle. This investigation provided data contributing to the studies of (1) the composition and energy of Birkeland current charge carriers, (2) the dynamic configuration of high-latitude magnetic flux tubes, (3) auroral particle source regions and acceleration mechanisms, (4) the role of E parallel to B and E perpendicular to B in the magnetosphere-ionosphere system, (5) the sources and the effects of polar cap particle fluxes, (6) the transport of plasma within and through the magnetospheric clefts, (7) wave-particle interactions, and (8) hot-cold plasma interactions. This instrument consisted of five identical detector heads, each having an electrostatic analyzer (of the ISIS-2 type) and two sensors (one electron channel and one ion channel). The detector heads were mounted on the main body. One of the detector heads was mounted in the spin plane, two were offset by ± 12°, and two were offset by ± 45°. One detector swept within a few degrees of the field line during each rotation of the spacecraft, except when the magnetic field was greatly deformed from its meridian plane. The basic mode of operation provided a 32-point energy spectrum from each sensor, but the voltages on the electrostatic analyzers were programmable to allow for operation over limited portions of the energy spectrum, or at higher time resolution with reduced energy resolution. The energy resolution was 32%. The angular resolution was 2.5° Full width at half maximum (FWHM) (in the plane of detection) by 10° (polar angle). The sampling rate was 64 per second, and the total acceptance angle was 5° by 20°. Due to a failure in the high-voltage power supply for the detectors, the instrument ceased operation on 1 December 1981.

=== Magnetic Field Observations Triaxial Fluxgate Magnetometer (MAG-A) ===
This investigation used a triaxial fluxgate magnetometer (MAG-A), similar to one on board DE-2, to obtain vector magnetic field data needed to study the magnetosphere-ionosphere-atmosphere coupling. The primary objective of this investigation was to obtain measurements of field-aligned currents in the auroral oval and over the polar cap at two different altitudes. This was accomplished using the two spacecraft and correlations of these measurements with observations of electric fields, plasma waves, suprathermal particles, thermal particles, and auroral images obtained from investigation 81-070A-03. Ultra low frequency (ULF) waves were also studied. The magnetometer incorporated its own 12-bit analog-to-digital converter, a 4-bit digital compensation register for each axis, and a system control to generate a 48-bit data word consisting of a 16-bit representation of the field measured along each of the three magnetometer axes. Track and hold modules were used to obtain simultaneous samples on all three axes. Instrument bandwidth was 25 Hz. The instrument dynamic range was ± 6.2E4 nT, and the resolution was ± 1.5 nT in the 6.2E4 nT region, ± 0.25 nT in the 1.E3 nT region, and ± 0.02 nT in the 80 nT region. The magnetometer's digital compensation of the ambient field was nominally in 8.E3 nT increments.

=== Plasma Waves Instrument (PWI) ===
The Plasma Wave Instrument (PWI) measured AC electric fields over the frequency range from 1 Hz to 2 MHz, and an amplitude range of 0.03 microvolt per meter to 100 mV per meter. Magnetic fields were measured from 1 Hz to 400 kHz over an approximately 100 dB range. The objectives of this investigation were to measure the spatial, temporal, spectral, and wave characteristics (particularly the Poynting vector component along the magnetic field line) and the wave polarization for extremely low frequency (ELF), very low frequency (VLF), and High frequency (HF) noise phenomena. Of special interest were the auroral kilometric radiation and VLF hiss, and a variety of electrostatic waves that may cause field-aligned acceleration of particles. The investigation made use of the long dipole antennas in the spin plane and along the Z-axis, and a magnetic loop antenna. A single-axis search coil magnetometer and a short electric antenna were included for low-frequency measurements and electrostatic noise measurements at short wavelengths. The electronics consisted of: (1) a wideband/long baseline receiver with a bandwidth of 10- or 40-kHz in the range 0-2-MHz; (2) a sweep-frequency correlator, containing two sweep-frequency receivers and phase detectors, sweeping 100-Hz to 400-kHz in 32 seconds, and giving the phase between magnetic and electric components of the field; (3) a low-frequency correlator containing two filter receivers and phase detectors (eight filters in the range 1.78–100 Hz were swept in 8 seconds); (4) DC monitors that measured the voltage difference between the two sets of long dipole antennas; and (5) a linear wideband receiver, selectable from 1.5 to 3.0, 3 to 6, or 10 to 16 kHz bands. The wideband receiver was flown to transmit wideband waveform signals to the ground via an analog transmitter so that detailed high-resolution frequency-time analysis could be performed. Since 23 June 1984, a malfunction in the spacecraft data-handling system has prevented access to some PWI data. Digital measurements from the sweep frequency receiver system were no longer accessible.

=== Retarding Ion Mass Spectrometer (RIMS) ===
The Retarding Ion Mass Spectrometer (RIMS) consisted of a retarding potential analyzer for energy analysis in series with a magnetic ion-mass spectrometer for mass analysis. Multiple sensor heads permitted the determination of the thermal plasma flow characteristics. This instrument was designed to operate in two basic commandable modes: a high-altitude mode in which the density, temperature, and bulk-flow characteristics of principally H+, He+, and O+ ions were measured; and a low-altitude mode that concentrated on the composition in the 1- to 32-units range. This investigation provided information on: (1) the densities of H+, He+, and O+ ions in the ionosphere, plasmasphere, plasma trough, and polar cap (including the density distribution along the magnetic vector in the vicinity of the satellite apogee); (2) the temperature of H+, He+, and O+ ions in the ionosphere, plasmasphere, plasma trough, and polar cap (energy range 0-45 eV); (3) the bulk flow velocities of H+, He+, and O+ in the plasmapause, plasma trough and polar cap; (4) the changing character of the cold plasma density, temperature, and bulk flow in regions of interaction with hot plasma such as at the boundary between the plasmasphere and the ring current; and (5) the detailed composition of ionospheric plasma in the 1-to 32-units range. He++ and O++ were also measured. The instrument consisted of three detector heads. One looked out in the radial direction, and the other two were along the plus and minus spin-axis directions. Each detector had a 55° half-cone acceptance angle. The detector heads had a gridded, weakly collimating aperture where the retarding analysis was performed, followed by a parallel plate ceramic magnetic mass analyzer with two separate exit slits corresponding to ion masses in the ratio 1:4. Ions exiting from these slits were detected with electron multipliers. In the apogee mode, the thermal particle fluxes were measured while the potential on a set of retarding grids was stepped through a sequence of settings. In the perigee mode, the retarding grids were grounded and the detector utilized a continuous acceleration potential sweep that focused the mass ranges from 1 to 8, and 4 to 32 units. Time resolution was 16 msecond.

=== Spin Scan Auroral Imager (SAI) ===
The Spin-Scan Auroral Imager (SAI) provided global auroral imaging at visible and ultraviolet (UV) wavelengths. It acquired: (1) images at several visible wavelengths; (2) images within a vacuum ultraviolet "window", which allowed usable imaging of the aurora in the sunlit ionosphere; and (3) photometric measurements of the hydrogen corona. This investigation provided data that advanced the knowledge of: (1) the spatial and temporal character of the entire auroral oval at both visible and vacuum ultraviolet wavelengths (with good time resolution); (2) the association of auroral and magnetospheric plasmas with the diverse auroral emission features; (3) the relationship of the auroral emissions with field-aligned currents; (4) the energy deposited in the auroral ionosphere by charged particles; (5) the acceleration mechanism responsible for "inverted-V" precipitation events; (6) the role of the polar cap and magnetotail in auroral and magnetospheric dynamics; and (7) the time-dependent distribution of neutral hydrogen in the ring current and polar regions. Of the three photometers, two measured radiation in the visible wavelength range and one measured it in the UV. A full image was 36° by 120°. Some of the wavelengths were 3914, 5577, 6300, 3175, 1304, 1216, 1400–1600, and 1400-1700 Angstrom (A). The spatial resolution of a pixel (picture element) at auroral altitudes in the nadir direction was 28 km (17 mi) at a spacecraft altitude of 1 Earth radius (R_{E}). At 3.9 (R_{E}) altitude this resolution was 109 km (68 mi). For each photometer, the time resolution was 3 to 12 minutes per image. For visible wavelengths, the photometers had a wide-angle collimator; a super-reflecting scanning mirror; a mirror-drive motor; a quartz field lens; an image-viewing assembly of field-stop, pinhole and collimating lens; a filter wheel with narrow-band interference filters; and a small photomultiplier tube with an extended red photocathode. The vacuum ultraviolet imaging photometer was a spin-scan Newtonian telescope. The first optical element was an aluminum scanning mirror with a magnesium fluoride (MgF_{2}) overcoat. The collimation and mirror drive were similar to that used for the visible imaging photometer. A filter wheel with MgF_{2}, calcium fluoride (CaF_{2}), and barium fluoride (BaF_{2}) filters allowed global imaging from 1370 to 1700, and at 1304, 1356, and 1216 A. The detector was a photomultiplier tube with a caesium iodide (CsI) photocathode and a MgF_{2} window.

== Launch ==
Explorer 62 was launched on 3 August 1981, at 09:56 UTC from Vandeberg Air Force Base.

== Mission results ==
As a result of a malfunction in the Thor-Delta 3913 launch vehicle in which its main engine shut off slightly early, Dynamics Explorer 2 reentered in 1983. Dynamics Explorer 1, being in a higher orbit, continued to collect data until 28 February 1991, when the mission was officially terminated, though it remains on orbit.

== See also ==
- Dynamics Explorer 2
- Explorer program
