= Dynamics Explorer =

NASA satellite of the Explorers Program

Dynamics Explorer (DE-1 and DE-2 or Explorer 62 and Explorer 63) was a NASA mission, launched on 3 August 1981, and terminated on 28 February 1991. It consisted of two unmanned satellites, DE-1 and DE-2, whose purpose was to investigate the interactions between plasmas in the magnetosphere and those in the ionosphere. The two satellites were launched together into polar coplanar orbits, which allowed them to simultaneously observe the upper and lower parts of the atmosphere.

== Mission ==
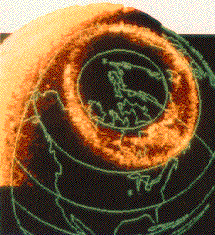
An aurora as seen by one of the Dynamics Explorers

The Dynamics Explorer (DE) mission's general objective is to investigate the strong interactive processes coupling the hot, tenuous, convecting plasmas of the magnetosphere and the cooler, denser plasma and gasses corotating in the Earth's ionosphere, upper atmosphere, and plasmasphere. Two satellites, DE-1 and DE-2, were launched together and were placed in polar coplanar orbits, permitting simultaneous measurements at high and low altitudes in the same field-line region. The DE-1 spacecraft (high-altitude mission) uses an elliptical orbit selected to allow (1) measurements extending from the hot magnetospheric plasma through the plasmasphere to the cool ionosphere; (2) global auroral imaging, wave measurements in the heart of the magnetosphere, and crossing of auroral field lines at several Earth radii; and (3) measurements for significant periods along a magnetic field flux tube.

== Spacecraft ==
The spacecraft approximated a short polygon 137 cm (54 in) in diameter and 115 cm (45 in) high. The antennas in the X-Y plane measured 200 m (660 ft) tip-to-tip, and on the Z-axis are 9 m (30 ft) tip-to-tip. Two 6 m (20 ft) booms are provided for remote measurements. Power is supplied by a solar cell array, mounted on the side and end panels. The spacecraft is spin-stabilized, with the spin axis normal to the orbital plane, and the spin rate at 10 ± 0.1 rpm. A pulse-code modulation (PCM) telemetry data system is used that operates in real time or in a tape recorder mode. Data have been acquired on a science-problem-oriented basis, with closely coordinated operations of the various instruments, both satellites, and supportive experiments. Data acquired from the instruments are temporarily stored on tape recorders before transmission at an 8:1 playback-to-record ratio. Additional operational flexibility allows a playback-to-record ratio of 4:1. The primary data rate is 16,384 bits per second. Since commands are stored in a command memory unit, spacecraft operations are not real time, except for the transmission of the wideband analog data from the Plasma Wave Instrument (1981-070A-02). On 22 October 1990, the science operations were terminated. On 28 February 1991, Dynamics Explorer 1 operations were officially terminated.

=== Dynamics Explorer 1 instrumentation ===
Dynamics Explorer 1 carried the following instruments:

- Energetic Ion Composition Spectrometer (EICS)
- High Altitude Plasma Instrument (HAPI)
- Magnetic Field Observations Triaxial Fluxgate Magnetometer (MAG-A)
- Plasma Wave Instrument (PWI), which measured auroral kilometric radiation, auroral hiss, Z-mode radiation, and narrow band electromagnetic emissions
- Retarding Ion Mass Spectrometer (RIMS)
- Spin-scan Auroral Imager (SAI)

In addition, there were two Earth-based investigations, Auroral Physics Theory and Controlled and Naturally Occurring Wave Particle Interactions Theory. The later involved broadcasting very-low-frequency/low-frequency (0.5–200-kHz) signals from a transmitter located at Siple Station, Antarctica, which were received by the PWI instrument on Dynamics Explorer 1.

== Regions traversed ==
Ionosphere, magnetosphere, plasmapause, plasmasphere, and trapped particle belts.

=== Dynamics Explorer 2 instrumentation ===
The Dynamics Explorer 2 carried the following instruments for data collection:

- Fabry–Pérot interferometer (FPI), which measured the meridional component of the neutral winds. (The meridional wind component is the component in the direction of lines of longitude - i.e. North–South.)
- Ion Drift Meter
- Langmuir probe
- Low-altitude Plasma Instrument
- Magnetometer
- Neutral Atmosphere Composition Spectrometer
- Retarding Potential Analyzer, which measured the ion flux along the velocity vector of the spacecraft. This data was then used to determine the ion temperature and drift velocity in the spacecraft's area.
- Vector Electric Field Instrument
- Wind and Temperature Spectrometer (WATS), which measured the zonal and vertical components of the neutral winds, as well as the kinetic temperature. (The zonal wind component is the component in the direction of lines of latitude - i.e. East–West.) The WATS instrument on DE-2 is one of the few satellite instruments which has measured thermosphere vertical wind speeds, with the Neutral Atmosphere Temperature Experiment (NATE). on Atmospheric Explorer C (AE-C) being one other.

== Mission results ==
As a result of a malfunction in the Thor-Delta 3913 launch vehicle in which its main engine shut off slightly early, DE-2 was placed into a slightly lower orbit than was anticipated. This was not a serious problem, however, and the spacecraft had lasted its expected lifespan when it re-entered the Earth's atmosphere on 19 February 1983.

An overview of the results from the first 5 years of the mission was published in a special edition of Reviews of Geophysics.

== Atmospheric entry ==
DE-1, being in a higher orbit, continued to collect data until 28 February 1991, when the mission was officially terminated.

== See also ==
- Explorers Program
