= Ally McCrae =

Radio Presenter

Ally McCrae (born 1987) is a radio broadcaster and media producer, best known for presenting the BBC Introducing show on BBC Radio 1 with Jen Long. He previously presented the BBC Introducing in Scotland show until it ended in June 2012. He is co-creator of production company Detour Scotland. He currently works in development for Channel 4.

== Introducing ==
On 2 November 2010 it was announced that Ally McCrae would take over from Vic Galloway as presenter of BBC Radio 1 Introducing show as part of a UK-wide shake up of BBC Radio 1's Introducing set up. He now presents the BBC Introducing show with Jen Long. He was also the UK voice actor of Jet-Vac from the Skylanders series.

In June 2014, it was announced that from 1 September 2014, the BBC Introducing show on a Sunday would no longer be broadcast, hence ending McCrae's career at the station.

== Detour Scotland ==
Detour Scotland was primarily created as a podcast for featuring unsigned Scottish bands but soon gained a reputation for putting on gigs, including "The Wee Jaunt". These gigs were held around the Glasgow area with the audience being taken round a host of locations, where several different local bands would perform sets everywhere from dark alley-ways to a large pond in Rouken Glen Park. Detour also runs events in several more common music venues around Scotland and runs an online video blog.

== Personal life ==
McCrae is an alumnus of Stirling University, where he obtained a degree in Film and Media Studies, and was the station manager of Stirling University's Air3 student radio station. In 2011, Scotland on Sunday ranked him Scotland's 9th "Most Eligible Man".
