= Vic Galloway =

British DJ (born 1972)

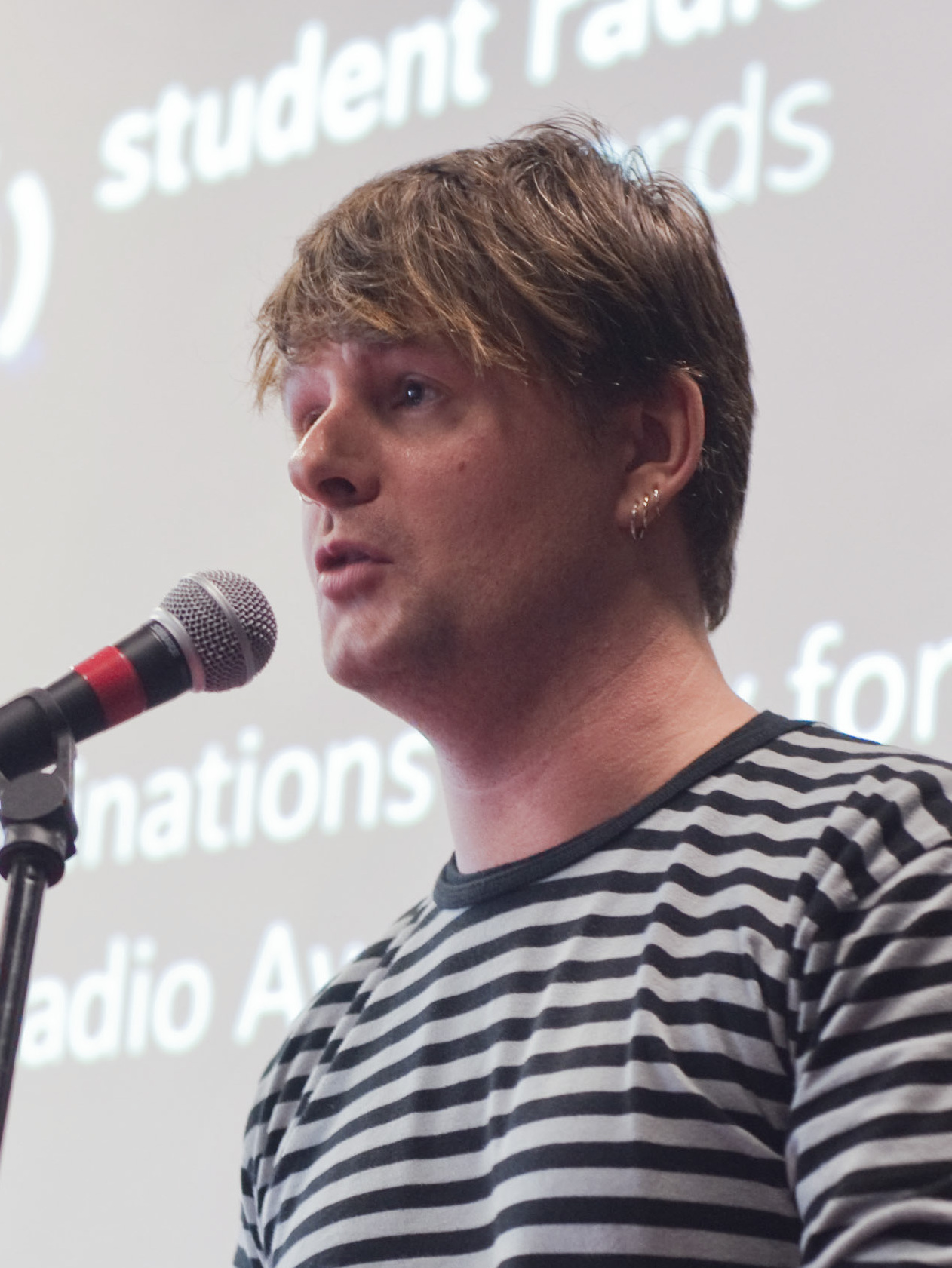
- Galloway in 2009
- Born: Michael Galloway; 4 August 1972 (age 54); Muscat, Oman
- Presenting career
- Show: Vic Galloway
- Station: BBC Radio Scotland
- Time slot: 8 pm – 10 pm Monday night
- Style: Disc Jockey
- Country: Scotland

Michael "Vic" Galloway (born 4 August 1972) is a Scottish radio and television presenter, writer and DJ. He hosts a self-titled show on BBC Radio Scotland every Monday from 8 pm to 10 pm and previously broadcast the BBC Introducing Scotland show. He had presented BBC Scotland's T in the Park television coverage every summer.

== BBC Radio ==
Galloway started out hosting BBC Radio 1's Introducing Show from Scotland. On 2 November 2010, it was announced that Galloway would be leaving the show, to be replaced by Ally McCrae.

In addition to his long-running regular show on BBC Radio, Galloway has presented various radio shows, including Mouthing Off and The Big Scottish Adventure, as well as various documentary series including Indie-pendent Scotland, The Banned History of Rock'n'Roll, Meet the Neighbours and School for Genius. He has broadcast live shows from the T in the Park, South by South West, Indian Summer, Live 8 and Connect festivals for the BBC. He has also presented the BBC Radio 1 Rock Show and covered for Marc Riley on BBC Radio 6 Music.

== BBC TV ==
Galloway has presented five years of BBC One and Two's T in the Park coverage, The Music Show on BBC 2, BBC 4's Caledonia Dreaming, and Channel 4's Transmission.

== Media career ==
As a freelance journalist, Galloway does regular work for newspapers, magazines and websites. He has also written for The List and contributed articles such as "Why more DJs must be like Peel" to the Sunday Herald. He is often invited to host and MC events, such as 'Burnsong', 'Ballads of The Book' and 'The Scottish Style Awards' in recent years. He also DJs in clubs and universities across the UK and abroad. In 2009–2010 he compered the 'Waverley Stage' as part of Edinburgh's legendary Hogmanay Street Party Celebrations. Galloway also writes a weekly column for the website Dear Scotland which features a listing of every Scottish band touring outside the UK that week.

== Personal life ==
Galloway grew up in Kingsbarns and Haddington and achieved three A-levels, two Highers and eight GCSEs. A member of the National Youth Theatre, he played in the bands Huckleberry, Miraclehead, and The Deaf Mutes and has also written for fanzines, worked as lighting director and co-ordinator at The Venue in Edinburgh, helped set up the independent Copper Records, and worked as press and radio promoter for Human Condition Records in Edinburgh. He's served as specialist advisor for the Scottish Arts Council as well as writing, performing and producing music of his own, most recently with Check Masses.
