= The Leg =

Scottish rock band

- Origin: Edinburgh, Scotland
- Genres: Indie rock, alternative rock, lo-fi
- Years active: 2006–present
- Labels: SL, Song, by Toad
- Members: Daniel Mutch; Pete Harvey; Alun Scurlock
- Website: www.ihatetheleg.co.uk

The Leg are a Scottish rock band from Edinburgh formed in 2006 by Daniel Mutch (Vocals, Guitar), Pete Harvey (Cello, Piano) and Alun Scurlock (previously Thomas, Drums). The band is formed from members of Khaya and Desc, following the break-up of the latter in 2005. The band have released four albums, first with SL Records and then Song, By Toad Records.

== Biography ==
The Leg were formed in 2006 by Dan Mutch, Pete Harvey and Alun Scurlock. Mutch and Harvey began playing together as members of Khaya, an acclaimed Edinburgh band who released a number of albums in the late 1990s and early 2000s, along with Greg Dodgson, John Mackie, Caroline Evens and Richie Anderson. The band gained national attention after recording two 'Peel Sessions' with legendary BBC Radio 1 DJ John Peel in 1999 and 2000.

Following the demise of Khaya in 2001, Mutch, Harvey and Mackie formed Desc, being joined by Alun Scurlock and Helena MacGlip. Desc released one album, Up Here In The Heat, before disbanding in 2005. After the break-up of Desc, Mutch, Harvey and Scurlock continued as The Leg.

== Music ==
Their first release was '8 Songs by the Leg: A musical tribute to the Forest of Dean', self-released in 2006. The record received little but positive attention in the media, and was described as 'mildly unhinged, but truly original' by The List.

Their full-length debut album, What Happened to the Shrunken Tina Turner followed in 2009, released by SL Records. The album was reissued by Song, by Toad Records in 2013 as part of the label's fifth anniversary box-set release.

In 2012 The Leg released An Eagle to Saturn with Edinburgh independent label Song, by Toad Records. The album received strong positive reviews in publications such as The Skinny and The Herald. The album was described as 'staggeringly brilliant' by The Scotsman, who likened the band to artists such as Tom Waits, Nick Cave and Captain Beefheart. The album was named as number 15 in The Herald's top 50 Scottish albums of 2012.

Follow up album Oozing a Crepuscular Light was released in 2013. The album again received positive reviews from The List and The Herald. The album was named number 35 in The Herald's best Scottish albums of 2013.

In 2020, they released their fifth studio album Chromatic Perversion on Tenement Records.

== Side Projects ==
Alongside their work as The Leg, the band are involved in a number of other projects. They have released four albums with Edinburgh musician Paul Vickers, under the name Paul Vickers & The Leg.

Pete Harvey has played cello with a number of artists, including Modern Studies. Alun Thomas also plays drums with Withered Hand.

== Discography ==
The Leg

- 8 Songs by the Leg (2006)
- What Happened to the Shrunken Tina Turner? (2009/2013)
- An Eagle to Saturn (2012)
- Oozing a Crepuscular Light (2013)
- Chromatic Perversion (2020)

Paul Vickers & The Leg

- Tropical Favourites (2008)
- Itchy Grumble (2010)
- The Greengrocer (2014)
- Jump (2019)
- Winter at Butterfly Lake (2025)
