= Paul Vickers =

Paul Vickers may refer to:

- Paul Vickers (musician)
- Paul Vickers (politician)
