= Club Anthems =

Club Anthems may refer to:

- Club Anthems (Ballboy album)
- Club Anthems (album series)
  - Club Anthems Vol. 1 2004
  - Club Anthems Vol. 2 2005
  - Club Anthems Vol. 3 2006
