= Sun Zoom Spark =

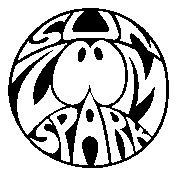
- Categories: music magazine
- Format: fanzine, colour magazine
- Founded: 1992
- First issue: October 1992; 33 years ago
- Final issue: October 1995; 30 years ago
- Based in: Galashiels

Sun Zoom Spark was a mid-1990s British music magazine. It covered alternative rock and britpop music. The magazine's editorial staff was based in Galashiels, Scotland. It took its name from a track on Captain Beefheart's LP Clear Spot.

== History ==
The magazine originally appeared as a fanzine in October 1992 and was sold by mail order. Its unusually professional production made it an immediate success, and after four issues it began to be sold in record shops, at which point the issue numbers started again from 1. From issue 4 (July 1994) onwards, it became a full-colour national magazine sold in newsagents.

In October 1995, the magazine was radically reformatted as a fortnightly inkie under the title The Trigger. It ran for only a handful of issues before closing down due to poor sales.

Paul Vickers had moved from Nottingham to Galashiels to work on the magazine with brothers Roger and Mike Simian. By the time the magazine shut down, Roger and Paul had begun writing songs together and formed the band Dawn of the Replicants in 1996, initially as a duo.

== Format ==
A large portion of each issue was a regular section called "Spotlight Kid", which focused entirely on up-and-coming new acts. The magazine also contained several playful features distributed throughout the pages, such as the surreal cartoons "A Severed Head" (by Borin Van Loon) and "The Adventures Of Flagwoman" (by Paul Vickers), a parody of "Did You Know..." columns titled "It's Daft, Like... But It's True" and what the editors called "sparks", short mottos which appeared at the bottom of most pages (including the front cover). This last feature was soon copied by the IPC Media publication Vox, leading to the tagline "...because Vox need the ideas" appearing on the cover of a later issue of Sun Zoom Spark. Another regular feature was "Ism-isms", a list of made-up buzzwords for various real or imagined cultural phenomena.
