= Ballboy (band) =

Scottish indie band

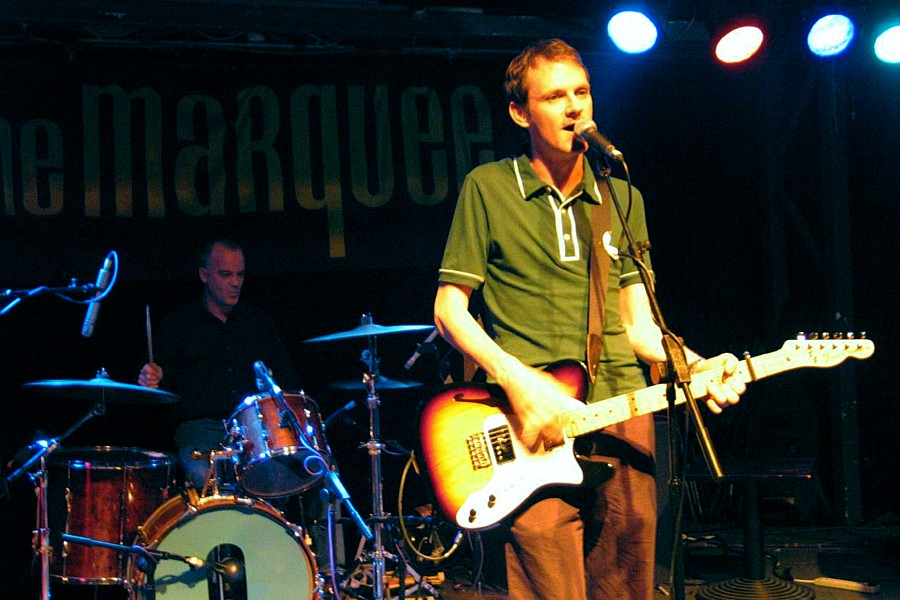
- Ballboy at The Marquee in 2005

Background information
- Origin: Edinburgh, Scotland
- Genres: Indie rock, indie folk, post-punk
- Years active: 1997–present
- Labels: SL, Pony Proof, Lost Map
- Members: Gordon McIntyre; Nick Reynolds; Gary Morgan; Alexa Morrison
- Past members: Viv Strachan; Alexis Beattie; Kate Griffiths
- Website: ballboymusic.com

Ballboy is a four-piece indie band from Edinburgh, Scotland. Formed in the late 1990s, the band released five albums between 2001 and 2008.

== Biography ==
Originally comprising Viv Strachan (vocals), Gordon McIntyre (guitar), Nick Reynolds (bass) and Alexis Beattie (drums), Ballboy played gigs around Edinburgh for a few years, and recorded tracks for the Edinburgh indie compilation it's a life sentence..., released by the newly formed SL Records label in 1997.

By 1999 Gordon McIntyre, the band's main songwriter, had taken over vocal duties. Katie Griffiths had joined on keyboards, and Gary Morgan had taken over the drums. The band signed to SL Records that year, and released a series of EPs. The tracks from these EPs were collected on 2001's Club Anthems. The band toured the United States in September / October 2002 and McIntyre's journal of the tour was published in The Scotsman newspaper.

Their "proper" debut album, A Guide for the Daylight Hours, was released in November 2002, featuring artwork by Glasgow-based artist David Shrigley. This album was followed in 2003 by the acoustic, and often melancholy, The Sash My Father Wore and Other Stories, virtually a solo record by McIntyre.

In 2004, Ballboy returned to full band mode, with a new keyboard player, Alexa Morrison, and their third album. The band continue to play live occasionally and released their fourth studio album I Worked on the Ships in August 2008. Gordon McIntyre has begun work on a side project, ++Money Can't Buy Music.

From their early releases, the band were popular with the DJ John Peel, and had several tracks featured in the Festive Fifty charts. They recorded several sessions for his BBC Radio 1 show, including a Christmas special live from Peel Acres, where McIntyre recorded a duet with American country singer Laura Cantrell.

In Autumn 2008, McIntyre composed the soundtrack for the Traverse Theatre Company production of Midsummer [a play with songs] by David Greig. Midsummer performed at the Traverse Theatre, Edinburgh, from 24 October to 15 November 2008. In 2018 the National Theatre of Scotland staged an expanded version of the play for the Edinburgh International Festival.

== Discography ==
=== Studio albums ===
- A Guide for the Daylight Hours (2002)
- The Sash My Father Wore and Other Stories (2003)
- The Royal Theatre (2004)
- I Worked on the Ships (2008)
- Merry Christmas to the Drunks, Merry Christmas to the Lovers (mini-album, 2013)

=== Compilation albums ===
- Club Anthems (2001, vinyl reissue 2023)

=== Singles / EPs ===
- "Silver Suits for Astronauts" (1999)
- "I Hate Scotland" (2000)
- "Girls Are Better Than Boys" (2001)
- "All the Records on the Radio are Shite" (2002)
- "Where Do the Nights of Sleep Go to When They do not Come To Me" (2002)
- "A Europewide Search for Love" (2003)
- "Past Lovers" / "I Lost You But I Found Country Music" (2004)
- "I Died for Love" (2005)

=== Contributions ===
- "Shallow Footprints in the Snow" - Avalanche Records Alternative Christmas (2009)
