= Paul Vickers (musician) =

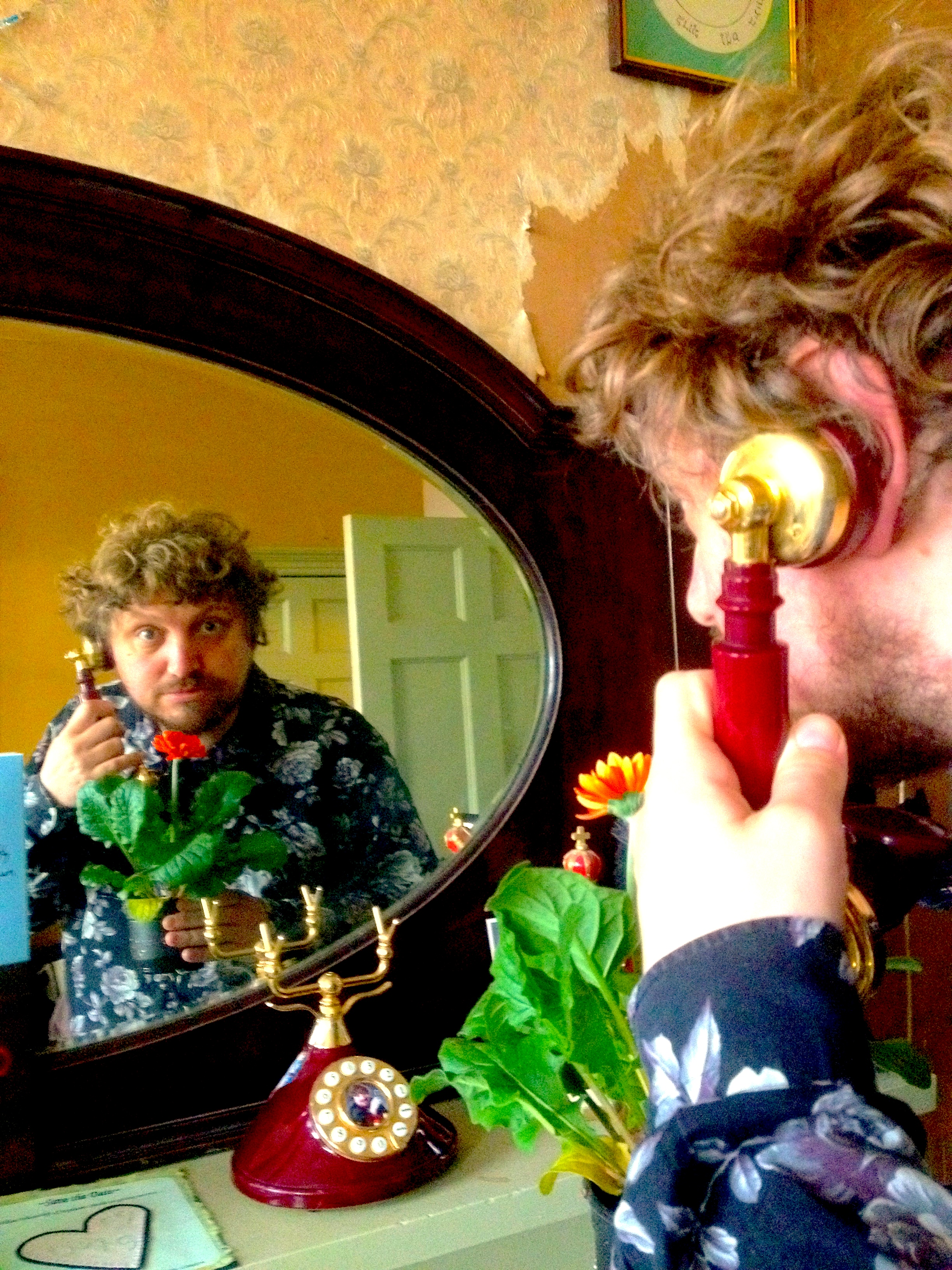
- Paul Vickers AKA Mr. Twonkey in 2014

Background information
- Born: June 13, 1973 (age 53)
- Genres: Indie rock, alternative rock, lo-fi, cabaret, comedy
- Years active: 1996–present
- Labels: eastwest, SL,
- Member of: Dawn of the Replicants
- Formerly of: The Leg
- Website: twonkey.bandcamp.com

Paul Vickers is the vocalist and lyricist with cult rock band Dawn of the Replicants. After the group went on indefinite hiatus in 2007, he continued to release music with various collaborators as well as branching out into comedy and writing. Described by The Guardian as "a pioneer of the indie/fringe crossover", since 2010 he has performed an annual, award-winning cabaret show at the Edinburgh Festival Fringe as Mr. Twonkey. He has also released five albums with Edinburgh band The Leg. In 2013 he published his first book, Itchy Grumble, and in 2015 his first theatrical play Jennifer's Robot Arm debuted in London. Twonkey's Mumbo Jumbo Hotel won the Malcolm Hardee Award for Comic Originality at the 2016 Edinburgh Fringe Festival. In 2022 What Broke David Lynch? written about the Hollywood film director having difficulty making a costume for The Elephant Man was announced as Vickers 2nd theatre vehicle with Paul playing Lynch himself.

== Early years ==
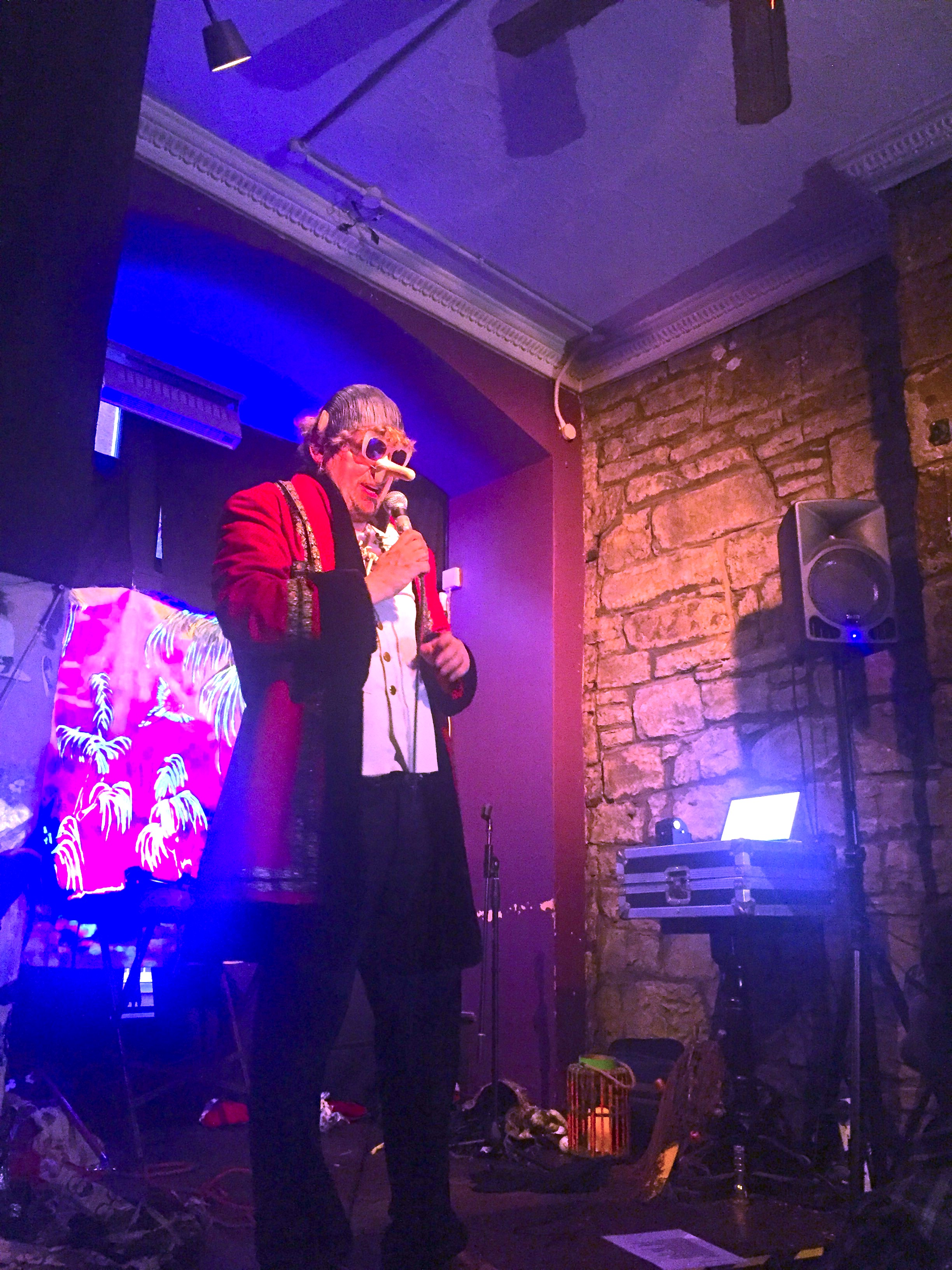
Mr Pines, Twonkey's Christmas in the Jungle, August 2017.

Vickers moved to Galashiels from Marske-by-the-Sea to work on a short-lived Scottish music magazine, Sun Zoom Spark. Several of the contributors formed the band Dawn of the Replicants and landed a major label record deal with eastwest, a subsidiary of Warner Music Group. Despite strong reviews and the backing of DJ John Peel, the group were dropped from eastwest after two albums. They continued releasing new material to critical acclaim on independent labels until Fangs (2006), their last studio album to date. Vickers also released an album of electronica with Replicants band member Roger Simian as Pluto Monkey in 2000.

== Comedy ==
Vickers, who enjoyed talking to the audience between songs at live shows, had long been encouraged to try his hand at stand-up. In 2008, he released a comedy album Recording The Impossible in collaboration with Andy Currie. The recording featured impersonations by Currie, elaborate sketches and musical backing, inspired by the likes of Ivor Cutler, the Jerky Boys, Chris Morris and Tom Waits. By 2009, Vickers was performing one-off stand-up gigs around Edinburgh as a solo act. That same year he performed at Edinburgh's prestigious The Stand Comedy Club, but was banned after covering the stage in syrup. He was finally allowed back in July 2015.

== Mr. Twonkey / Twonketta ==
In 2010, he made his debut at the Edinburgh Festival Fringe, performing Twonkey's Cottage throughout the month of August. He has performed a new "Twonkey" show at each subsequent Fringe Festival (and the Brighton Festival since 2012). Title character "Twonkey" was initially a small on-stage puppet, described as "half dragon, half witch, all accountant" and she featured heavily in the absurdist storytelling. By his fourth show, Twonkey's Blue Cadabra, the puppet was gone, with Vickers himself referred to as Mr. Twonkey. His on-stage persona has been described as "Harpo Marx on heroin," as he tells "tales of such ridiculousness that they make the works of Edward Lear sound like the Six O'Clock News."

The shows have been a critical success, garnering positive reviews from, amongst others, The Scotsman and Time Out, where the show's unique peculiarity allowed it to be described as "a steaming pile of twaddle" in a four star review.

2013's Twonkey's Blue Cadabra "about young Stan Laurel's sexual yearnings, a flying Parisian tailor and a girl who regrettably booked a skiing holiday while on ecstasy," had "a warmth that's often missing from absurdism." It was nominated for a 2013 TO&ST Award for Best Cabaret at the Edinburgh Festival Fringe, which lead to a 2014 performance at London's Soho Theatre.

Fifth show Twonkey's Private Restaurant opened in 2014, featuring tales of "time travel, puffer fish and dictators", and rated as "oddly entertaining and utterly bizarre", and "mind-boggling from start to finish". Time Out described it as "a dog's dinner of unexpected, absurd, even offensive content. But it's also a classic."

In 2015, Paul performed Twonkey's Private Restaurant with a return to The Soho Theatre and at the Prague Fringe Festival. He debuted new show Twonkey's Stinking Bishop, at the Brighton Fringe in May, before returning to the Edinburgh Fringe in August. The run, with shows selling out, was his most successful yet, receiving four star reviews in The Times and The Scotsman. The latter also featured Mr. Twonkey on their front page, with Kate Copstick's review claiming "oddity by oddity, song by song, Twonkey draws them in" and "he creates wonderlands of weird". Also described as "a genuinely laugh-aloud show, a joyous experience", and "being in his presence for an hour is delightful", it garnered a nomination for the 2015 Malcolm Hardee Award For Comic Originality.

In 2016, Paul's seventh show Twonkey's Mumbo Jumbo Hotel was performed at the Beckenham Comedy Cabaret, Brighton Fringe Festival, Wandsworth Fringe, Prague Fringe and Buxton Fringe before the Edinburgh Fringe Festival in August 2016, where it played in tandem with performances of Paul's play, Twonkeys Drive In: Jennifer's Robot Arm. Described as "bizarre and brilliant" and "the best value, pound-for-pound, of weirdness anywhere on the Fringe", with Vickers as "the master of bizarre asides and surreal set ups". The show would garner critical acclaim before winning The Malcolm Hardee Award for Comic Originality.

2017's Twonkey's Christmas in the Jungle was also met with acclaim, described by The Scotsman as "a crazy, wonderful show, by a crazy, wonderful performer". Vickers also tackled previous criticisms regarding the lack of a "narrative thread... this show has one. It's tied around his waist and, by the end of the show, it almost strangles him."

2018's Twonkey's Nightrain To Liechtenstein was a huge success, playing at the Prague, Edinburgh and Buxton comedy festivals, garnering a nomination for Best Comedy Show at the latter. The Scotsman suggested Twonkey had "gone positively mainstream this year", although not all reviewers agreed, with one noting "there's an emotional centre to this show which Twonkey lovers will not have experienced before." Most coverage made special mention of two new songs, 'the glorious' Pubs and Furs, "a heartbreaking song that deserves a life outside of this show".

2019 brought the 10th anniversary show Twonkey's Ten Year Twitch, playing at Leicester, Prague and Buxton comedy festivals before a month long run at the Edinburgh Fringe. With storylines jumping from stolen Neil Diamond outfits to the landlady of Leonardo da Vinci ("ahead of his time, but behind on his rent"), Vickers had created "a world even Salvador Dalí would dismiss as a wretched fever-dream." Reviews of this "sparklingly original cabaret" included four stars in The Scotsman ("Climb aboard his Weird but Wonderful Waltzer and away we go"), with The Skinny noting "after ten years, it wouldn't be the Fringe without Twonkey".

Twonkey's Custard Club was announced as his 2020 show. But after a brief preview and inclusion in several comedy festivals, shows from March 2020 until the end of the summer were cancelled due to the coronavirus pandemic.

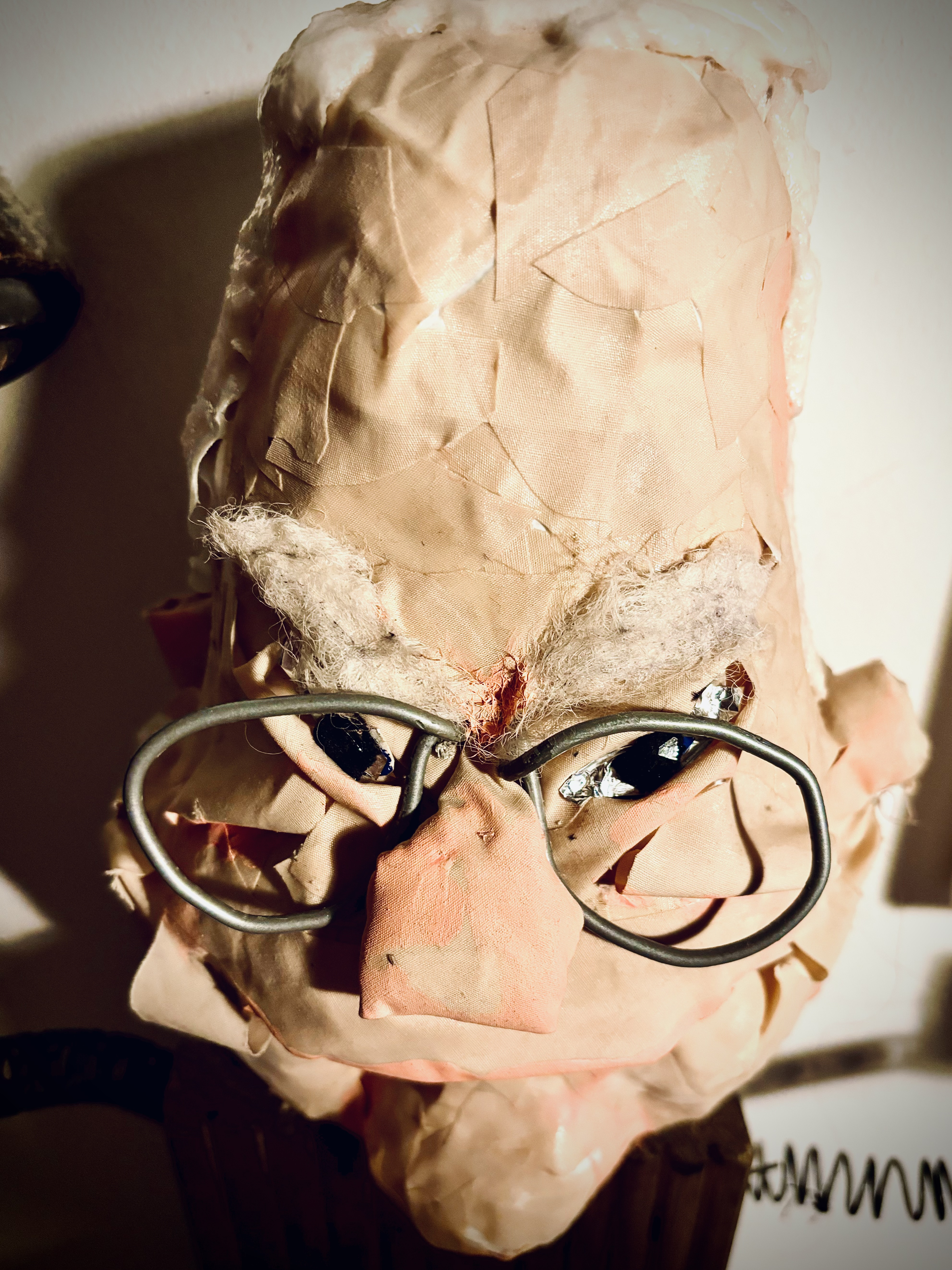
Steve Martin puppet by Grant Pringle

In 2021 he played "a decade-celebrating show at the Soho Theatre" with Twonkey's Greatest Twitch, which then played at The Voodoo Rooms ballroom during the 2023 Edinburgh Fringe Festival. The show featuring "a whole lot of whimsy and a self-aware scrappiness", with "few Fringe sights this year more unsettling than The Wobbly Waiter, a dismembered, dead-eyed puppet and frying pan fixture, advancing down the aisle", received glowing reviews, described as "clowning at its very best" in The Scotsman's five star rating.

Twonkey's Basket Weaving In Peru debuted at London's Angel Comedy Club in April 2024 before an Edinburgh Festival Fringe run throughout August. The first all-new Twonkey show since the pandemic featured "music (which) really shines, reprising some of the elusive sensations conjured by Dawn Of The Replicants", and "concentrated hysteria you can’t find anywhere else", in a five star Neuro Diverse Review. "A strangely accurate Steve Martin formed out of sanitary pads”, was a puppet made by Dawn of the Replicants drummer Grant Pringle, who had also provided puppets for previous shows including Mothra, The Flying Tailor, and show favourite Chris Hutchinson.

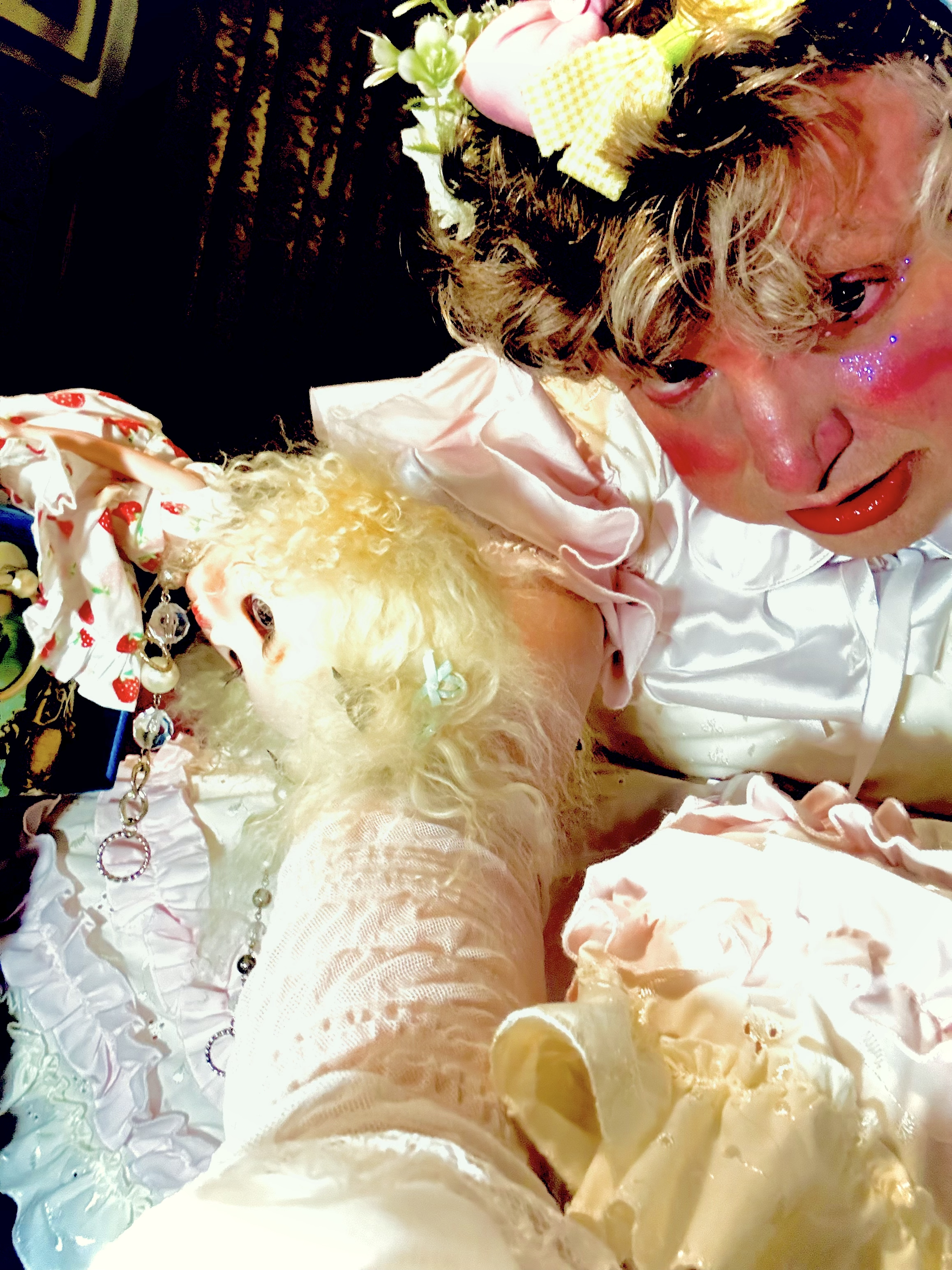
Twonketta and Toots

Twonkey's Zip Wire to Zanzibar debuted at London's Museum of Comedy in March 2025.

The show’s August 2025 run would find it reaching the Top 10% of best reviewed comedy shows at the Edinburgh Festival, described as "something that really exemplifies the experimental spirit of the Fringe".

Zanzibar featured the debut of Twonketta, “Twonkey’s heretofore unknown wife (now widow), dressed in an outfit that screams naughty maid from a Carry On movie… doing her best to continue her late husband’s legacy”, with Vickers performing the entire show in drag.

Steve Martin returned (in puppet form) with a “plot taking a backseat to the chaos, as ever with a Twonkey show” and “vocals (which) punch you in the face like an enthusiastic teddy bear”. The show was described as “the ‘Fringiest’ act on the Fringe” by Broadway Baby’s four star review.

The 2026 show, Twonkey’s Soft December Night in Tallahassee, once again lead by Twonketta, played at the Prague, Edinburgh, and Dundee Fringe Festivals between May and September. Five star reviews from Edinburgh and Dundee noted “the performance is utterly unique... a singing, puppeteering tour-de-force with philosophical diversions and a constant stream of dadaist nonsense”. But “beneath the glittery eyeshadow and red dolly-shoes, something is different… he ends the show with the final lines from Anne Frank’s Diary (and) treats the words with such reverence it sobers the audience”. North West End UK stated “Twonketta is the complete package; singing, dancing, a touch of burlesque, no turn un-stoned… you will definitely not find anything like this anywhere else.”

== Music ==
Since Dawn of the Replicants went on hiatus, Vickers has continued to release music. His collaborators in no particular order include Replicants bandmates, The Leg, Hamish Hawk, Pierre Chandeze, his brother Steven Vickers, Clutch Daisy, Miss Hypnotique, John Callaghan, Massimiliano Puddu, Andy Currie, Keith Baxter, Joe Woods, Andrew Foggin and various local musicians.

== Paul Vickers and The Leg ==
After the last Dawn of the Replicants album, Vickers joined up with Edinburgh band The Leg. Their first release, the "brilliant but frightening" Tropical Favourites, came out in early 2008 as Paul Vickers & The Leg. The "majestic debut" was followed by Itchy Grumble in 2010. Described as "barely-directional noise that careers along like a 50s scientist on a flying bedstead," Vickers would return to the story behind this "glorious mini rock opera" in 2013 with his debut novel. The band's third album, The Greengrocer, was initially announced in 2012 but not released until 2014. It was met with critical acclaim, described as a "new epic... a sonic map of Vickers and Co's collective psyche in all its warped glory," with The Herald stating "central... is Vickers himself, verbal ideas flying from him like sparks from a Catherine Wheel, voice flipping from abrasive gargle to sneering panto-dame witch."

A fourth album Jump was released in late 2019 on Tenement Records, featuring an expanded line-up of The Leg. It garnered reviews in Mojo, Uncut and four stars in The Scotsman, who described it as "a Beefheart-inspired cacophony of punk strings and throaty testifying". Vickers spoke of their approach with The Herald. "We want to be entertaining, but I always think we have to be unique", describing his vocals as once sounding like "evil Coldplay, whereas now I think I've become a little bit more Shirley Bassey."

Winter At Butterfly Lake, their fifth album, was released by PX4M in 2025. Lyrically, Vickers stated the album was "a heartbreak suite… due to incidents in my personal life". Featuring Pete Harvey’s "lush orchestrations", it was described by Classic Rock Magazine as "a clash of classicism and dark acid carbaret, (where) the ridiculous turns profound". The LP release was accompanied by a mini documentary on Vickers's work to date, Contents of the Earth.

== Paul Vickers and Friends ==
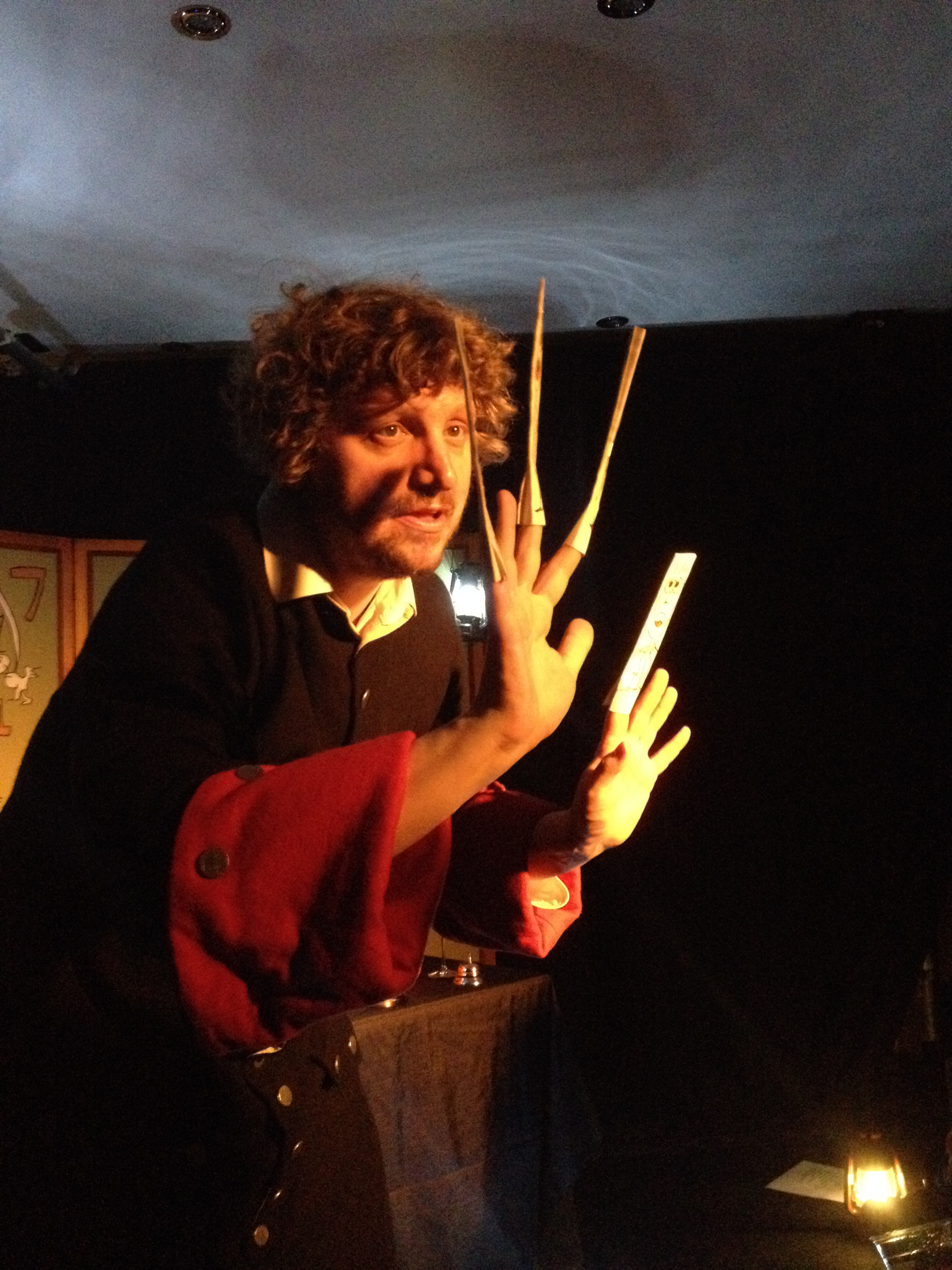
Twonkey Finger Fantasy, Edinburgh 2015

Vickers has also been "turning out magnificently warped albums on an annual basis" to accompany his Fringe shows. The first in 2010, Fucking Storys, was composed almost entirely of spoken word absurdist comedy. Since Oom-pah! in 2011, the albums have consisted of a roughly even mix of spoken word and songs. Oom-Pah! was from Paul Vickers and The Vicarage, but subsequent albums have been credited to Paul Vickers and Friends, possibly to avoid any confusion that The Vicarage were an actual backing band. 2012's Nest of Knickers included four new songs by Dawn of the Replicants, the first tracks credited to the band since 2007. The album also featured his first collaborations with Parisian musician Pierre Chandeze, credited as "Paul & Pierre". 2015 saw compilation Hooks, Vine and Sinister, with the album Peggy's Raspberry Spaghetti accompanying Twonkey's Mumbo Jumbo Hotel in 2016. With a rebranding to Twonkey and Friends, 2018's album Stronger Than Marzipan was released exclusively through Bandcamp.

In 2024, From Auchtermuchty to Peru Everyone Say Boo ! was released, containing tracks from the cancelled pandemic-era Custard Club and new show Twonkey's Basket Weaving in Peru. Vickers also reconfigured his earlier Twonkey discography at this time on Bandcamp. Stronger Than Marzipan was remixed and edited to 20 tracks. And two new compilations featured tracks from the previous six Twonkey albums.

Can I Steal a Chip? An E.P. Soundtrack to Twonkey's Zip Wire to Zanzibar was released concurrently with his 2025 Twonkey show. The soundtrack to the 2026 show was titled The Fairy That Spits, also released via Bandcamp.

== Writing ==
An expansion of the storyline first presented in the 2010 album Itchy Grumble finally appeared in prose form, which Vickers considered a huge achievement given his dyslexia. He has also been diagnosed with autism. In 2012 he won the Shortbread Stories: Self Publish or Perish competition and Itchy Grumble (the book) was released in 2013. It also contained 27 short stories taken from the Twonkey shows and albums from 2010 to 2013. He also produced an audiobook of Itchy Grumble, released in 2015.

Vickers, who stated he "always wanted to try every single area of the arts before I die," added the radio play to his repertoire with Pissed as a Postman: The Radio Play, included as the closing track to 2014's Giddy World.

His first full length theatrical play with self-penned songs and music by Pete Harvey on piano Jennifer's Robot Arm, based on an earlier short story, was performed as a work in progress in London, first at The White Bear Theatre in February and The Bread and Roses Theatre in April 2015. It later had a monthlong run at the 2016 Edinburgh Fringe Festival. Fringe Review highly recommended the production 'The daft, crude make-up and the uncomfortable humour instantly bring to mind The Tiger Lillies' Shockheaded Peter going on to say 'The play has a happy ending – or as happy an ending such a twisted piece of insane Gothic could have'. The Show, described as 'weirdly colourful and unsettling' The Stage awarded five stars saying 'You will appreciate writer Vickers' and director Jay's skill at getting their actors to play on several levels simultaneously with an impressive totality, creating a dark, demented, possibly absurdist comedy that alternately caresses and slaps you from all sides'. Vickers also confirmed that Itchy Grumble has been adapted for the theatre and may be produced at a later date.

His 2nd play What Broke David Lynch? (written with help from Ben Nardone) debuted at the Edinburgh Fringe festival in August 2022. The sold out run was picked out by The Guardian as one of '50 shows to see'. Vickers himself portrayed David Lynch as he prepares to direct The Elephant Man (1980). The performance was described as capturing 'something of Lynch's oddball persona and his rather eccentric cadence'. The cast of four also featured Miranda Shrapnell as Lynch's 'unlikely love interest (who) handles her two dimensional character beautifully'. Robert Atler and Steven Vickers both took on dual roles as Anthony Hopkins / John Hurt and Mel Brooks / John Geilgud respectively, described as 'a gloriously Pythonesque double act... the motorbike and sidecar (scene) is a thing of joyful genius.

== Solo shows ==
- Twonkey's Cottage (2010)
- Twonkey's Castle (2011)
- Twonkey's Kingdom (2012)
- Twonkey's Blue Cadabra (2013–2014)
- Twonkey's Private Restaurant (2014–2015)
- Twonkey's Stinking Bishop (2015)
- Twonkey's Mumbo Jumbo Hotel (2016)
- Twonkey's Christmas in the Jungle (2017)
- Twonkey's Night Train To Liechtenstein (2018)
- Twonkey's Ten Year Twitch (2019–2020)
- Twonkey's Custard Club (2020, Cancelled)
- Twonkey's Greatest Twitch (2021–2023)
- Twonkey’s Basket Weaving in Peru (2024)
- Twonkey's Zip Wire to Zanzibar (2025)
- Twonkey's Soft December Night in Tallahassee (2026)

== Discography ==
=== Recording The Impossible ===
- Recording The Impossible (2008)

=== Paul Vickers (and Friends) ===
- Fucking Storys (2010)
- Oom-Pah! (2011)
- Nest of Knickers (2012)
- Gasp! (2013)
- Giddy World (2014)
- The Hooks, Vine and Sinister Compilation (2015)
- Peggy's Raspberry Spaghetti (2016)
- Stronger Than Marzipan (2018 – remixed and edited 2024, Bandcamp)
- The Greatest Twitch Compilation (2024, Bandcamp)
- The Early Years : Recorded in Venice Compilation (2024, Bandcamp)
- From Auchtermuchty to Peru Everyone Say Boo ! (2024, Bandcamp)
- Can I Steal a Chip ? (2025, Bandcamp)
- The Fairy That Spits (2026, Bandcamp)

=== Paul Vickers and The Leg ===
- Tropical Favourites (2008)
- Itchy Grumble (2010)
- The Greengrocer (2014)
- Jump (2019)
- Winter at Butterfly Lake (2025)

== Theatre ==
- Twonkey's Drive In: Jennifer's Robot Arm (2015–2016)
- What Broke David Lynch ? (2022)

== Bibliography ==
- Itchy Grumble and Collected Miniatures (2013)
