= The Royal Theatre =

Studio album by Ballboy
- Released: June 1, 2004
- Genre: Indie
- Label: SL Records

Ballboy chronology
The Sash My Father Wore and Other Stories	The Royal Theatre	I Worked on the Ships

The Royal Theatre is the third studio album by Scottish group Ballboy, released on June 1, 2004.

== Track listing ==
1. "Let's Fall in Love and Run Away From Here"
2. "I Don't Have Time to Stand Here With You Fighting About the Size of My Dick"
3. "The Art of Kissing"
4. "There Are Only Inches Between Us, But There Might As Well Be Mountains and Trees"
5. "We Are Past Our Dancing Days"
6. "I Died For Love"
7. "The Time Out Guide"
8. "The Ghosts of New Orleans"
9. "Shallow Footprints in the Snow"
10. "Now You Can Be Good to Yourself At Home"
