= Club Anthems (Ballboy album) =

Compilation album by Ballboy
- Released: 2001
- Genre: Indie
- Label: SL Records

Ballboy chronology
Club Anthems	A Guide for the Daylight Hours

Professional ratings
Review scores
Source	Rating
Allmusic	link

Club Anthems is a compilation by Scottish group Ballboy, released in 2001 on SL Records. It was subsequently distributed in the United States by Manifesto Records in 2002. It is a collection of the songs released on their first three EPs, Silver Suits for Astronauts (1999), I Hate Scotland (2000), and Girls Are Better Than Boys (2001), although some tracks were re-recorded for the album release.

In January 2023, the album was issued on vinyl for the first time through Lost Map Records.

== Track listing ==
1. "Donald in the Bushes With a Bag of Glue"
2. "A Day in Space" (new version)
3. "Dumper Truck Racing"
4. "Public Park"
5. "Essential Wear For Future Trips to Space"
6. "I Hate Scotland"
7. "One Sailor Was Waving"
8. "Olympic Cyclist" (acoustic version)
9. "Leave the Earth Behind You and Take a Walk in the Sunshine"
10. "I've Got Pictures of You in Your Underwear"
11. "Swim For Health"
12. "They'll Hang Flags From Cranes Upon My Wedding Day"
13. "Postcards From the Beach"
14. "Sex Is Boring" (acoustic version)
