= I Worked on the Ships =

Studio album by Ballboy
- Released: 2008
- Genre: Indie
- Label: Pony Proof Records

Ballboy chronology
The Royal Theatre	I Worked on the Ships

I Worked on the Ships is the fourth studio album by Scottish group Ballboy, released in the UK on 25 August 2008. The album is the first to be recorded on the band's own label, Pony Proof Records.

== Track listing ==
1. "The Guide to the Shortwave Radio"
2. "Songs for Kylie"
3. "Cicily"
4. "Godzilla Vs The Island of Manhattan (with you and I somewhere in-between)"
5. "Disney's Ice Parade"
6. "A Relatively Famous Victory"
7. "Empty Throat"
8. "We can leap buildings and rivers, but really we just wanna fly"
9. "Above the clouds the sun is always shining"
10. "Picture Show"
11. "Absent friends"

== Critical reception ==
The Scotsman newspaper commented that the album showed the band's "most beautiful, wistful storytelling to date, encasing his whimsical, witty, yet sometimes stark lyrics in some of their folkiest arrangements yet."

Listings magazine The Skinny gave the album 3 out of 5, saying that "this delicious long-player will merely rekindle wanting desire in long-term lovers, never eliciting the advances of fresher faced admirers".

Music Week review said "Alex Turner’s fondness for taking mundane subject matter and transforming it into something poetic may well have won him plaudits on Arctic Monkeys records, but McIntyre has been doing it for years... a little gem of an album."
