= A Guide for the Daylight Hours =

Studio album by Ballboy
- Released: 2002
- Genre: Indie
- Label: SL Records

Ballboy chronology
Club Anthems (2001)	A Guide for the Daylight Hours (2002)	The Sash My Father Wore and Other Stories (2003)

Professional ratings
Review scores
Source	Rating
Allmusic	link

A Guide for the Daylight Hours is the debut album by Scottish group Ballboy, released in 2002. The album artwork was provided by David Shrigley.

== Track listing ==
1. "Avant Garde Music"
2. "Where Do The Nights of Sleep Go to When They Do Not Come to Me"
3. "You Can't Spend Your Whole Life Hanging Around With Arseholes"
4. "I Wonder If You're Drunk Enough to Sleep With Me Tonight"
5. "I Lost You, But I Found Country Music"
6. "A Europewide Search For Love"
7. "Something's Going to Happen Soon"
8. "Nobody Really Knows Anything"
9. "Sex Is Boring"
10. "Meet Me at the Shooting Range"
