= Dawn of the Replicants =

- Origin: Galashiels, Scotland
- Genres: Indie rock
- Years active: 1996– present
- Labels: East West, Hungry Dog (Flying Sparks imprint), SL Records
- Members: David Coyle; David Little; Roger Simian; Mike Small; Paul Vickers
- Past members: Donald Kyle; Grant Pringle

Dawn of the Replicants are a Scottish indie rock quintet from Galashiels. Four of the 1997 line-up (Pringle, Vickers, Simian and Small) had previously worked together on the short-lived Scottish music magazine Sun Zoom Spark.

== Band members ==
- Donald Kyle: bass & guitar (1997 to 2001)
- Grant Pringle: drums, guitar, keyboards & vocals (1997 to 2001)
- Roger Simian: guitar, keyboards & vocals (1996 to present)
- Mike Small: guitar, keyboards & vocals (1997 to present)
- Paul Vickers: lead Vocals, keyboards & gadgetry (1996 to present)
- David Coyle: bass, guitar & vocals (2002 to present)
- David Little: drums, vocals & engineer (2002 to present)

== Biography ==
Initially a duo (Vickers and Simian), the band released a mail-order EP, entitled So Far So Spitfire in December 1996. John Peel and Mark Radcliffe gave the EP substantial radio airplay. The band was expanded to a quintet and a second self-released single followed in the summer of 1997. They signed for East West Records, a subsidiary of Warner Bros. Records. Before the close of the year, a few more EPs followed, accolades from the NME, and The Times newspaper declared them the 'best new band of 1997'.

The 1998 single "Candlefire", taken from the debut album, reached number 52 in the UK Singles Chart. The follow-up, "Hogwash Farm"(lead track of The Diesel Hands EP), peaked at number 65. That summer the band played both the Glastonbury and Reading Festivals.

Before his death, John Peel aired five sessions, four as Dawn of the Replicants plus a one-off session which Vickers and Simian recorded as side project, Pluto Monkey. The band's single "Science Fiction Freak", taken from the second Replicants' album, made John Peel's 'Festive Fifty' in 1999. The album sold less well than its predecessor and Warner Bros. dropped the band.

In 2000, Vickers and Simian released an album and two singles through Shifty Disco of electronica, under the name Pluto Monkey.

After a break the band returned with a third album and a live tour in 2002. In 2005 the band played at the South by Southwest Festival. In recent years they have also recorded sessions for Huw Stephens on BBC Radio 1 and Marc Riley on BBC 6 Music. While on tour in the UK during early 2006, the band took part in the Abbey Road Sessions for American satellite radio station U-Pop and enjoyed video plays on MTV2, whilst Mojo, NME, Uncut, and Q all carried reviews of their fifth studio album, Fangs.

In 2006 ten years was celebrated with a 22-track singles collection, the first 1,000 copies of which included a free DVD, featuring live footage, videos and interviews. New tracks were recorded in early 2007 for the sixth studio album. Members of Dawn of the Replicants can currently be found working on projects including Paul Vickers and The Leg, Mr. Twonkey, The Stark Palace, The Stone Ghost Collective, Mike and Michi, The Border Boogie Band, The Countess of Fife, The Shamanic Project, The Wedding Present, P.P. Arnold and The Duncan MacKinnon Music and Arts Trust venue Mac Arts.

== Discography ==
=== Albums ===
- One Head, Two Arms, Two Legs (East West Records) 1998
- Wrong Town, Wrong Planet, Three Hours Late (East West Records) 1999
- Touching The Propeller (Flying Sparks) 2002
- The Extra Room (Hungry Dog) 2004
- Fangs (SL Records) 2006

=== Compilations ===
- Bust the Trunk: The Singles (SL Records) 2006

=== EPs ===
- "So Far So Spitfire EP" (dumb/SULK trigg-er) 1996
- "Violent Sundays EP" (East West Records) 1997
- "All That Cheyenne Caboodle EP" (East West Records) 1997
- "Rhino Rays EP" (East West Records) 1997
- "The Diesel Hands EP" (East West Records) 1998 - UK Singles #65
- "I Smell Voodoo EP" (East West Records) 1998 - UK Singles #88
- "Bun Magic EP" (Simple Bounty) 2005

=== Singles ===
- "Candlefire" (East West Records) 1998 - UK Singles #52
- "Born in Baskets" (Fierce Panda Records) 1998
- "Rule the Roost" (East West Records) 1999
- "Science Fiction Freak" (East West Records) 1999
- "Rockefeller Center, 1932" (Flying Sparks) 2002
- "Leaving Town / Smoke Without Fire" (Flying Sparks) 2002
- "Ricecake Rabbit Soul" (Flying Sparks) 2005
- "Essence of Maureen / Little Driver" (SL Records) 2005
- "Oh Bumblebee (SL Records) 2006
- "Fix the Air" (SL Records) 2006
