= SL Records =

Scottish record label

- Founded: 1997
- Founder: Ed Pybus & Merlin Kemp
- Status: Active
- Genre: Alternative rock Indie pop
- Country of origin: Scotland, UK
- Location: Edinburgh

SL Records was a record label based in Edinburgh, Scotland. It was founded in 1997 and is known for releasing anti-folk, alternative rock, and indie pop albums. The label's first release was the compilation album It's a Life Sentence, which was released in May 1997. The album compiled tracks by different artists who had performed live on a radio show co-hosted by Ed Pybus, who later became the label's founder, along with his flatmate Merlin Kemp. Pybus started the label soon after graduating from university; "SL" in the label's name stands for "student loans". The label came to greater attention after its first single, Khaya's "Summer/Winter Song," was played on air by multiple British radio hosts, including John Peel.

== Notable artists ==
Notable current or former SL Records artists include the following:

- Ballboy
- Dawn of the Replicants
- Misty's Big Adventure
- Saint Jude’s Infirmary
- Withered Hand
