= The Wedding Present discography =

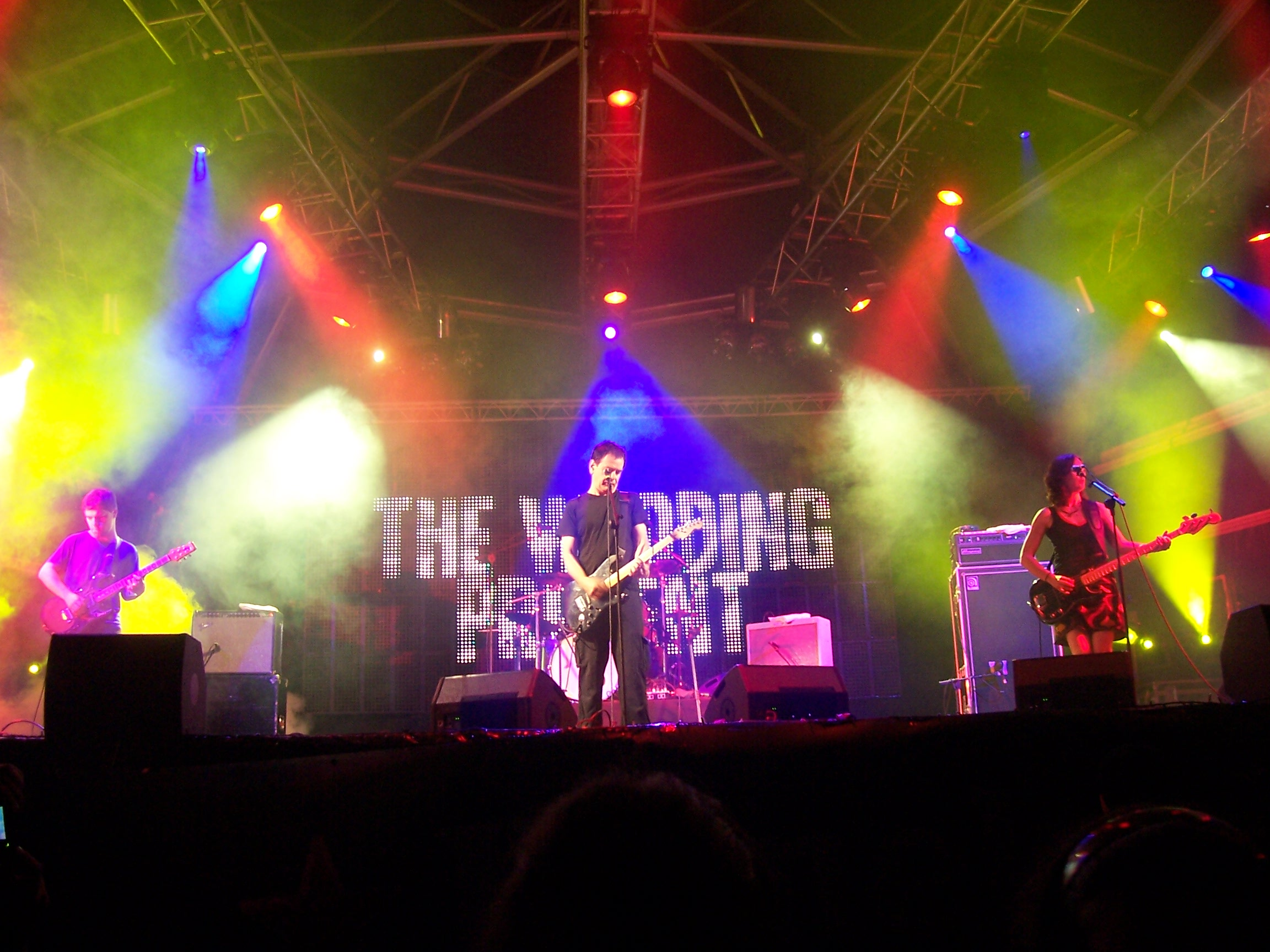
- The Wedding Present performing at Cultura Quente in Caldas de Reis, Spain, July 2009.
- Studio albums: 9
- Extended plays: 17
- Live albums: 24
- Compilation albums: 21
- Singles: 54
- Video albums: 3
- Box sets: 3
- Other albums: 5

The Wedding Present's discography consists of 54 singles, 17 extended plays, 9 studio albums, 24 live albums and 21 compilation albums. The band were formed in 1985 in Leeds, England by David Gedge, Peter Solowka and Keith Gregory. At the height of their popularity the band had a run of twelve top-30 singles in twelve months, equalling a record set by Elvis Presley.

== Albums ==
=== Studio albums ===
Title	Album details	Peak chart positions		
Title	Album details	UK	UK Indie	SCO
George Best	Released: 12 October 1987; Label: Reception; Formats: CD, LP, MC	47	1	—
Bizarro	Released: 23 October 1989; Label: RCA; Formats: CD, LP, MC	22	—	—
Seamonsters	Released: 27 May 1991; Label: RCA; Formats: CD, LP, MC	13	—	—
Watusi	Released: 12 September 1994; Label: Island; Formats: CD, LP, MC	47	—	82
Saturnalia	Released: 9 September 1996; Label: Cooking Vinyl; Formats: CD, LP, MC	36	—	67
Take Fountain	Released: 14 February 2005; Label: Scopitones; Formats: CD	68	7	70
El Rey	Released: 20 May 2008; Label: Vibrant; Formats: CD, LP	102	12	—
Valentina	Released: 19 March 2012; Label: Scopitones; Formats: CD, LP, digital download	77	9	88
Going, Going...	Released: 2 September 2016; Label: Scopitones; Formats: CD, 2xLP, digital download	35	9	19
"—" denotes releases that did not chart or were not released in that territory.

=== Live albums ===
Title	Album details
Leicester Poly 5th May 1987	Released: 1987; Label: Self-released; Formats: MC
Munchen Alabama-Halle 22/11/87	Released: 1987; Label: Self-released; Formats: MC
Rotterdam 30 March 1988	Released: 1988; Label: Self-released; Formats: MC
Valencia 18 November 1988	Released: 1988; Label: Self-released; Formats: MC
Middleton 30 April 1989	Released: 1989; Label: Self-released; Formats: MC
Frankfurt 3 November 1989	Released: 1989; Label: Self-released; Formats: MC
Hoboken 10th June 1990	Released: 1990; Label: Self-released; Formats: MC
Kilburn 20th November 1990	Released: 1990; Label: Self-released; Formats: MC
Wakefield 28 August 1991	Released: 1991; Label: Self-released; Formats: MC
Uppsala 13 November 1991	Released: 1991; Label: Self-released; Formats: MC
Den Haag 30 October 1992	Released: 1992; Label: Self-released; Formats: MC
Windsor 28 October 1993	Released: July 1994; Label: Self-released; Formats: MC
Strasbourg 16 December 1994	Released: 1995; Label: Self-released; Formats: MC
L'exo Rouen France 17 March 1995	Released: 1995; Label: Self-released; Formats: MC
Portsmouth 22 November 1995	Released: 1996; Label: Self-released; Formats: MC
Detroit 21 March 1996	Released: 1996; Label: Self-released; Formats: MC
Munich 21 December 1996	Released: 1997; Label: Self-released; Formats: MC
Shepherd's Bush Welcomes the Wedding Present	Released: November 2007; Label: Secret; Formats: CD
Live in Leeds	Released: 10 January 2010; Label: Scopitones; Formats: digital download
Bizarro : Live in Tokyo, 2010	Released: 16 February 2011; Label: Youth Inc., &; Formats: 2xCD, digital download
Live 2007	Released: 14 July 2017; Label: Scopitones; Formats: CD+DVD, digital download
Live 2017 [Part 2]	Released: 22 March 2018; Label: Scopitones; Formats: CD+DVD, digital download
Live 2010	Released: 6 September 2019; Label: Scopitones; Formats: CD+DVD, digital download
Live 2012	Released: 23 July 2021; Label: Scopitones; Formats: CD+DVD, digital download

=== Compilation albums ===
Title	Album details	Peak chart positions	
Title	Album details	UK	UK Indie
Tommy	Released: 11 July 1988; Label: Reception; Formats: CD, LP, MC	42	1
The BBC Sessions	Released: 1988; Label: Dutch East India Trading/Strange Fruit; Formats: CD, MC; US-only release	—	—
Ukrainian John Peel Sessions	Released: February 1989; Label: Reception; Formats: CD, 10", MC	22	—
Hit Parade 1	Released: 8 June 1992; Label: RCA; Formats: CD, LP, MC	22	—
Hit Parade 2	Released: 4 January 1993; Label: RCA; Formats: CD, LP, MC	19	—
John Peel Sessions 1987–1990	Released: 8 November 1993; Label: Strange Fruit; Formats: CD, LP	—	—
Evening Sessions 1986–1994	Released: 9 June 1997; Label: Strange Fruit; Formats: CD	—	—
John Peel Sessions 1992–1995	Released: 27 April 1998; Label: Cooking Vinyl; Formats: CD	—	—
Singles 1989–1991	Released: 9 March 1999; Label: Manifesto; Formats: 2xCD; US-only release	—	—
Singles 1995–97	Released: September 1999; Label: Cooking Vinyl, Manifesto; Formats: CD	—	—
Search for Paradise: Singles 2004–5	Released: 16 May 2006; Label: Scopitones, Manifesto; Formats: CD+DVD	—	—
Live 1987	Released: 22 October 2007; Label: Scopitones; Formats: 2xCD, digital download; Compiles the first two self-released tapes	—	—
Yé Yé – The Best of the RCA Years	Released: 10 December 2007; Label: Sony BMG; Formats: CD	—	—
Live 1988	Released: 29 March 2010; Label: Scopitones; Formats: 2xCD, digital download; Compiles the third and fourth self-released tapes	—	—
Live 1989	Released: 18 October 2010; Label: Scopitones; Formats: 2xCD, digital download; Compiles the fifth and sixth self-released tapes	—	—
Live 1990	Released: 9 January 2012; Label: Scopitones; Formats: 2xCD, digital download; Compiles the seventh and eighth self-released tapes	—	—
Live 1991	Released: 22 October 2012; Label: Scopitones; Formats: 2xCD, digital download; Compiles the ninth and tenth self-released tapes	—	—
Live 1992	Released: September 2013; Label: Scopitones; Formats: 2xCD, digital download; Compiles a self-released tape plus a previously unreleased live recording	—	—
Live 1993	Released: March 2016; Label: Scopitones; Formats: 2xCD, digital download; Compiles a self-released tape plus a previously unreleased live recording	—	—
Marc Riley Sessions Volume 1	Released: 9 December 2016; Label: Hatch; Formats: CD, LP, digital download	—	—
Marc Riley Sessions Volume 2	Released: 6 October 2017; Label: Hatch; Formats: CD, LP, digital download	—	—
Marc Riley Sessions Volume 3	Released: 15 February 2019; Label: Hatch; Formats: CD, LP, digital download	—	—
Marc Riley Sessions Volume 4	Released: 21 February 2020; Label: Hatch; Formats: CD, LP, digital download	—	—
24 Songs	Released: May 2023; Label: Scopitones; Formats: CD, LP	—	—
Live 1994	Released: June 2024; Label: Scopitones; Formats: CD, LP; Includes a self-released tape	—	—
"—" denotes releases that did not chart.

=== Box sets ===
Title	Album details
Registry	Released: 1 November 1999; Label: Cooking Vinyl; Formats: 4xCD
The Complete Peel Sessions	Released: 26 March 2007; Label: Castle Music; Formats: 6xCD
How the West Was Won	Released: 27 October 2008; Label: Vibrant; Formats: 4xCD; Limited release

=== Video albums ===
Title	Album details
*Punk	Released: 24 September 1990; Label: BMG Video; Formats: VHS
Dick York's Wardrobe – The Hit Parade Videos	Released: December 1992; Label: BMG Video/RCA; Formats: VHS
An Evening With The Wedding Present	Released: 2007; Label: Secret Films; Formats: DVD
Drive	Released: 10 October 2011; Label: MVD Visual; Formats: DVD; US-only release

=== Other albums ===
Title	Album details	Peak chart positions
Title	Album details	UK Indie
George Best 30	Released: 22 September 2017; Label: Scopitones; Formats: CD, LP, digital download; Re-recording of album	27
Tommy 30	Released: 9 August 2019; Label: Scopitones; Formats: CD, LP, digital download; Re-recording of album	17
Not from Where I'm Standing	Released: 4 December 2020; Label: Scopitones; Formats: CD, 2xLP; As the Wedding Present & Friends	—
Locked Down and Stripped Back	Released: 26 February 2021; Label: Scopitones; Formats: CD, LP, MC, digital download	24
Locked Down and Stripped Back – Volume Two	Released: 1 July 2022; Label: Scopitones; Formats: CD, LP, digital download	9
"—" denotes releases that did not chart.

== EPs ==
Title	Album details	Peak chart positions	
Title	Album details	UK	UK Indie
'Don't Try and Stop Me, Mother'	Released: January 1986; Label: Reception; Formats: 12"	—	—
The Peel Sessions	Released: October 1986; Label: Strange Fruit; Formats: 12"	123	7
Radio 1 Session The Evening Show	Released: December 1988; Label: Strange Fruit/Nighttracks; Formats: CD, 12"	—	6
3 Songs EP	Released: 17 September 1990; Label: RCA; Formats: 7", 10", 12", CD, MC	25	—
Hit Parade 3	Released: 1993; Label: RCA; Formats: CD, MC; France-only mini-album	—	—
Mini	Released: 22 January 1996; Label: Cooking Vinyl; Formats: CD, 10"	92	—
The Thing I Like Best About Him Is His Girlfriend	Released: 5 May 2008; Label: Vibrant; Formats: CD, digital download	—	—
Holly Jolly Hollywood	Released: 27 October 2008; Label: Vibrant; Formats: CD, digital download	—	—
4 Chansons EP	Released: 21 April 2012; Label: Scopitones; Formats: 10"	—	—
4 Songs EP	Released: 25 October 2012; Label: Scopitones; Formats: digital download	—	—
4 Lieder EP	Released: 20 April 2013; Label: Scopitones; Formats: 10"	—	—
EP 4 Cân	Released: 19 April 2014; Label: Scopitones; Formats: 10"	—	—
Hove Sessions EP 1	Released: 27 October 2014; Label: Demon; Formats: 7"	—	—
Hove Sessions EP 2	Released: 27 October 2014; Label: Demon; Formats: 7"	—	—
The Home Internationals E.P.	Released: 22 April 2017; Label: El Segell del Primavera; Formats: CD, 12", digital download	—	—
Huw Stephens Session	Released: 9 November 2018; Label: Hatch; Formats: CD, 10", digital download	—	—
Shaun Keaveny Session	Released: 2 October 2020; Label: Hatch; Formats: 7", digital download	—	—
"—" denotes releases that did not chart or were not released in that territory.

== Singles ==
Title	Year	Peak chart positions				Album
Title	Year	UK	UK Indie	IRE	SCO	Album
"Go Out and Get 'Em Boy"	1985	—	14	—	—	Non-album singles
"Once More"	1986	161	4	—	—	Non-album singles
"You Should Always Keep in Touch with Your Friends"/"This Boy Can Wait"	1986	172	3	—	—	Non-album singles
"My Favourite Dress"	1987	95	4	—	—	George Best
"Anyone Can Make a Mistake"	1987	—	3	—	—	George Best
"Nobody's Twisting Your Arm"	1988	46	2	—	—	Non-album singles
"Why Are You Being So Reasonable Now?"	1988	42	1	—	—	Non-album singles
"Davni Chasȳ" (withdrawn)	1988	—	—	—	—	Ukrainian John Peel Sessions
"Kennedy"	1989	33	—	—	—	Bizarro
"Brassneck"	1990	24	—	—	—	Bizarro
"Dalliance"	1991	29	—	—	—	Seamonsters
"Lovenest"	1991	58	—	—	—	Seamonsters
"Blue Eyes"	1992	26	—	20	—	Non-album singles, issued within months on Hit Parade 1
"Go-Go Dancer"	1992	20	—	14	—	Non-album singles, issued within months on Hit Parade 1
"Three"	1992	14	—	17	—	Non-album singles, issued within months on Hit Parade 1
"Silver Shorts"	1992	14	—	13	—	Non-album singles, issued within months on Hit Parade 1
"Come Play with Me"	1992	10	—	17	—	Non-album singles, issued within months on Hit Parade 1
"California"	1992	16	—	20	—	Non-album singles, issued within months on Hit Parade 1
"Flying Saucer"	1992	22	—	26	—	Non-album singles, issued within months on Hit Parade 2
"Boing!"	1992	19	—	25	—	Non-album singles, issued within months on Hit Parade 2
"Loveslave"	1992	17	—	24	—	Non-album singles, issued within months on Hit Parade 2
"Sticky"	1992	17	—	29	—	Non-album singles, issued within months on Hit Parade 2
"The Queen of Outer Space"	1992	23	—	23	—	Non-album singles, issued within months on Hit Parade 2
"No Christmas"	1992	25	—	30	—	Non-album singles, issued within months on Hit Parade 2
"Yeah Yeah Yeah Yeah Yeah"	1994	51	—	—	54	Watusi
"It's a Gas"	1994	71	—	—	88	Watusi
"Sucker"	1995	—	—	—	—	Non-album single
"2, 3, Go"	1996	67	—	—	76	Saturnalia
"Montreal"	1997	40	—	—	47	Saturnalia
"Interstate 5"	2004	62	—	—	76	Take Fountain
"I'm from Further North Than You"	2005	34	6	—	42	Take Fountain
"Ringway to SeaTac"	2005	157	18	—	—	Take Fountain
"You Jane"	2012	—	—	—	—	Valentina
"Metal Men" (limited release)	2012	—	—	—	—	Non-album singles
"Two Bridges" (limited release)	2013	—	—	—	—	Non-album singles
"Metal Men" (French version; limited release)	2013	—	—	—	—	4 Chansons EP
"Meet Cute" (Welsh version; limited release)	2015	—	—	—	—	EP 4 Cân
"Bear"	2016	—	—	—	—	Going, Going...
"White Riot" (limited release)	2018	—	—	—	—	Non-album singles
"Jump In, the Water's Fine"		—	—	—	—	Non-album singles
"Crawl"	2020	—	—	—	—	Locked Down and Stripped Back
"We Should Be Together"	2020	—	—	—	—	Locked Down and Stripped Back
"My Favourite Dress"	2021	—	—	—	—	Locked Down and Stripped Back
"We Should Be Together" (featuring Louise Wener)	2022	—	—	—	—	Non-album singles
"I Am Not Going to Fall in Love with You"	2022	—	—	—	—	Non-album singles
"Go Go Go"	2022	—	—	—	—	Non-album singles
"Monochrome"	2022	—	—	—	—	Non-album singles
"X Marks the Spot"	2022	—	—	—	—	Non-album singles
"Once Bitten"	2022	—	—	—	—	Non-album singles
"We Interrupt Our Programme"	2022	—	—	—	—	Non-album singles
"Each Time You Open Your Eyes"	2022	—	—	—	—	Non-album singles
"We All Came from the Sea"	2022	—	—	—	—	Non-album singles
"Astronomic"	2022	—	—	—	—	Non-album singles
"Science Fiction"	2022	—	—	—	—	Non-album singles
"The Loneliest Time of Year"	2022	—	—	—	—	Non-album singles
"—" denotes releases that did not chart.
