= Simon Smith (drummer) =

British drummer

Simon Smith has been the drummer with several British Indie rock bands, most notably The Wedding Present from Leeds, which he joined in 1988, and also worked with its offshoot The Ukrainians.

== Career ==
Simon Smith started out briefly as a member of The Chorus with Peter Solowka, who also became a member of The Wedding Present. The Chorus released tracks on the AAZ record label from 1983 to 1985 including the 7" double A side single "These Stones" / "Diamond Mine".

Simon left The Chorus to join stable mates The Sinister Cleaners in 1985, replacing the drum machine that had featured on their earlier releases. He released 3 12" EPs with The Sinister Cleaners and toured the UK and Europe with them from 1985 to 1987. Simon left The Sinister Cleaners to join The Wedding Present as drummer in 1987, working briefly with Sinister Cleaner Len Liggins and Pete Solowka in The Wedding Present offshoot band The Ukrainians. Simon, along with Keith Gregory, Paul Dorrington (both ex-Wedding Present) and Jaqui Cohen (ex-Dustdevils), started a new group called Cha Cha Cohen in 1994. Simon split his time between Cha Cha Cohen and The Wedding Present until 1997, when Wedding Present singer / guitarist David Gedge took a break in order to start a new group, Cinerama. Cha Cha Cohen went on to make two albums on the Glasgow-based Chemikal Underground Records label, and, thanks to their help, Simon began tour managing for a living.

Simon also played gigs and recorded with Beachbuggy, brainchild of former Wedding Present bass player and guitarist Jack Straker.

In 2004, David Gedge and Wedding Present guitarist Simon Cleave began using the name The Wedding Present again but Simon Smith was not asked to join the band's new line-up.

== Discography ==
=== With The Wedding Present ===
==== UK singles ====
1. Why Are You Being So Reasonable Now? (Reception 1988)
2. Давні Часи/Davni Chasy (promo, Reception 1988/RCA 1989)
3. Kennedy (RCA 1989)
4. Brassneck (RCA 1990)
5. 3 Songs EP (RCA 1990)
6. Dalliance (RCA 1991)
7. Lovenest (RCA 1991)
8. Blue Eyes (RCA 1992)
9. Go-Go Dancer (RCA 1992)
10. Three (RCA 1992)
11. Silver Shorts (RCA 1992)
12. Come Play with Me (RCA 1992)
13. California (RCA 1992)
14. Flying Saucer (RCA 1992)
15. Boing! (RCA 1992)
16. Loveslave (RCA 1992)
17. Sticky (RCA 1992)
18. The Queen of Outer Space (RCA 1992)
19. No Christmas (RCA 1992)
20. Yeah Yeah Yeah Yeah Yeah (Island 1994)
21. It's a Gas (Island 1994)
22. Sucker (no label 1995)
23. 2, 3, Go (Cooking Vinyl 1996)
24. Montreal (Cooking Vinyl 1997)

==== Albums ====
1. Українські Виступи в Івана Піла (compilation album, RCA 1989)
2. Bizarro (RCA 1989)
3. Seamonsters (RCA 1991)
4. Hit Parade 1 (compilation, RCA 1992)
5. Hit Parade 2 (compilation, RCA 1992)
6. Peel Sessions 1987-1990 (compilation, Strange Fruit 1993)
7. Watusi (Island 1994)
8. Mini (Cooking Vinyl 1995)
9. Saturnalia (Cooking Vinyl 1996)
10. Evening Sessions 1986-1994 (compilation, Strange Fruit 1997)
11. John Peel Sessions 1992-1995 (compilation, Cooking Vinyl 1998)
12. Singles 1995-1997 (compilation, Cooking Vinyl 1999)
13. Singles 1989-1991 (compilation, Manifesto 1999)
14. The Hit Parade (2CD compilation, Camden Deluxe 2003)

=== With Cha Cha Cohen ===
==== Singles ====
1. Sparky's Note (Hemiola 1994)
2. 538 ep (Chemikal Underground 1995)
3. Spook on the High Lawn (Chemikal Underground 1997)
4. Freon Shortwave (Chemikal Underground 1998)

==== Albums ====
1. Cha Cha Cohen (Chemikal Underground 1998)
2. All Artists Are Criminals (Chemikal Underground 2002)
