= Tse Tse Fly (band) =

UK musical group

- Origin: Leeds, England
- Genres: Alternative rock
- Years active: 1988–1994
- Labels: Ablution, Morphene, Cherry Red, Pehr
- Past members: Jayne Lockey; Simon Cleave; Paul Dorrington; Mark Goodrham; Ian McCrimmon

Tse Tse Fly were an alternative rock group from Leeds, England, formed in 1988 by former A.C. Temple guitarist Paul Dorrington, along with Jayne Lockey and Simon Cleave. They released several EPs and an album before splitting up in 1994. All three original members went on to join The Wedding Present.

== History ==
Dorrington (guitars), Lockey (vocals, bass) and Cleave (vocals, guitar) formed the band in 1988, although their first release was not until 1992, the Duckweed Smuggled Home EP, by which time Dorrington had left to replace Peter Solowka in The Wedding Present. The line-up later included Mark Goodrham (guitar, vocals) and Ian McCrimmon (drums). They followed their first release with the Fox Under Diesel EP in 1993, before signing to Cherry Red, who issued their only album while together, Mudflat Joey, in 1994. After the album's release, Lockey and Cleave both joined The Wedding Present, effectively ending Tse Tse Fly. Cleave was also a member of Cinerama. A second album combining the first two EPs and four additional tracks was released in 2001 on Pehr Records.

== Musical style ==
The band's sound has been described as "guitar-squall", with comparisons to Sonic Youth and that dog., with Lockey and Cleave often alternating on vocals within the same song. Their sound also included what has been described as a "frantic trebly bass". They also used samples of sounds such as dogs and telephones. On their later releases they moved more towards psychedelic rock, and a similarity to The Wedding Present was also noted. Allmusic's Mike DaRonco, reviewing Fox Under Diesel, described "the swirly guitar effects and distorted bass" which gave them an "edgier, almost psychedelic feel to their noisy pop."

== Discography ==
=== Singles, EPs ===
- Duckweed Smuggled Home EP (1992) Ablution
- Fox Under Diesel EP (1993) Morphene
- "Fledgeling" (1994) Cherry Red
- "Scaffolding" (1994) Cherry Red

=== Albums ===
- Mudflat Joey (1994) Cherry Red
- Tse Tse Fly (2001) Pehr
