= Torino (album) =

Studio album by Cinerama
- Released: July 2, 2002
- Genre: Indie pop
- Length: 49:42
- Label: Manifesto
- Producer: David Gedge, Simon Cleave, Steve Albini, Dare Mason

Professional ratings
Review scores
| Source | Rating |
|---|---|
| AllMusic | 3/5 stars |
| No Ripcord | 5/10 |
| Pitchfork | 8.0/10 |

Torino is an album by the UK band Cinerama. It was released on July 2, 2002, on Manifesto Records.

== Track listing ==
All tracks composed by David Gedge and Simon Cleave

1. "And When She Was Bad" – 2:53
2. "Two Girls" – 2:43
3. "Estrella" – 3:15
4. "Cat Girl Tights" – 5:03
5. "Airborne" – 2:06
6. "Quick, Before It Melts" – 5:03
7. "Tie Me Up" – 4:15
8. "Careless" – 2:53
9. "Close Up" – 4:17
10. "Starry Eyed" – 2:54
11. "Get Up and Go" – 4:24
12. "Get Smart" – 3:31
13. "Health and Efficiency" – 6:25

== Personnel ==
Cinerama

- David Gedge - vocals, guitar
- Simon Cleave - guitar
- Sally Murrell - keyboards, vocals
- Terry de Castro - bass, vocals
- Kari Paavola - drums
