= Groop Dogdrill =

English rock band

Groop Dogdrill were an English rock band formed in the early 1990s in Doncaster, South Yorkshire, England, by Damien "Damo" Fowkes (bass), Pete Spiby (vocals/guitar) and Hugh "Hug" Kelly (drums). They achieved modest success, releasing a number of singles and two albums in between numerous tours of the UK, before finally splitting up in 2001.

== Band history ==
The band were originally called Dogdrill, until they played a show with The Wedding Present at The Tunbridge Wells Forum, on 24 August 1994. Dogdrill were renamed 'Groop' Dogdrill by Wedding Present drummer Simon Smith, and they played as Groop Dogdrill from that day onwards.

They entered a 'battle of the bands' competition in their hometown of Doncaster, as they were unable to afford the bass gear that would allow them to start working the live circuit. The band won the competition (and the bass gear) and also caught the eye of a young producer called Matt Elliss at Axis Studios who offered to record a demo at the studio free of charge. Matt Elliss then passed the song onto a new label called EXP (a subsidiary of ViaCom) which was being run by Feargal Sharkey, formerly of The Undertones. The label demoed the band and released a limited edition (500) 7" single "Gentleman's Soiree" / "Silver Boots" before agreeing to record and release a full-length album. After a brief tour of the UK with Cable the band went into the studio to start recording tracks for their debut long player. A further single, "Gracelands" (1996) and more tours (with A amongst others) followed, but financial difficulties forced EXP to fold before the full album was released.

The band were soon picked up by Mantra Records (part of the Beggars Banquet group), and further tours followed before the album Half Nelson, recorded for EXP two years earlier, was eventually released by Mantra in 1998. The album chronicled the band's obsessions with Americana, the Rat Pack, working class humour, the seedier side of personal and sexual relationships and classic 1970s movies, with an ever-present combination of metal, punk, blues and rockabilly at its core.

They began to accumulate a small but loyal fanbase, helped by features in Kerrang! and NME, a series of incendiary live shows and a growing (if not necessarily accurate) reputation for on- and off-stage violence. Tours of the UK and Europe followed (with Carter USM, Therapy? and Motörhead amongst others) and the band eventually had the opportunity to tour their spiritual home, the United States. A double headline tour with the London-based band Penthouse (who were renamed 'Fifty Tons of Black Terror' for the occasion, after a legal run-in with the head of the adult magazine who shared their name) ensued.

By 1998, most of the band had moved from their hometown of Doncaster to the neighbouring city of Sheffield, but returned to Axis Studios in Doncaster, to again work with Matt Elliss. They recorded their second album Every Six Seconds, after potential plans to record in Steve Albini's studio in Chicago were scrapped.

A UK tour with The Yo-Yos and up and coming indie hotshots The Hives as first on, preceded the release of Every Six Seconds late in 2000. The album showcased a more sonic vocabulary and more diverse songwriting. A number of favourable reviews followed, but the band knew Mantra were not in a financial position to back the band. After meetings the band decide to leave the label before a decision was made on their behalf, as the label was culling its roster. Within three months the second album had sold as many as the debut release.

A series of unfortunate events followed. With the loss of their management, booking agent and lack of financial funds, Kelly made the decision to quit the band in December 2000. Fowkes and Spiby decided to continue and eventually recruited a new drummer, Alex Thomas, for a handful of gigs. They recorded a new demo in the mid-2001. This lineup was short-lived however, and the band had permanently split by the end of the year.

== Personnel ==
- Pete Spiby sang with Boneyard prior to Groop Dogdrill.

After Groop Dogdrill, Spiby formed Future eX Wife releasing two mini albums on Captains of Industry and a live album via Careless Talk Costs Lives magazine. He currently plays in Black Spiders which he formed in 2007, self-releasing their first album Sons of the North through Cargo distribution and a second via DXX, an imprint label of Cooking Vinyl. He has played and recorded drums for Tenebrous Liar.

- After Groop Dogdrill Damo Fowkes formed in Three Stages of Pain who released two albums entitled With Chaos In Her Wake and Black Heart Blues on the Undergroove label.

After 3 Stages of Pain split up, he formed Tryals with Lee Knights, a prog/doom hybrid, they recorded and released one album for Dethroned Records. Fowkes is currently in the band Arbor Low.

- Hugh Kelly played with Beachbuggy from 1991 to 1996 and was an occasional member of The Wedding Present during 1996-97. After leaving Groop Dogdrill, Kelly largely retreated from the music business, but briefly returned to play with a re-formed Beachbuggy during 2005-06. He is currently playing with the Doncaster band Walker, with former Beachbuggy and Wedding Present members Paul Dorrington and Darren Belk.
- After Groop Dogdrill Alex Thomas played with Badly Drawn Boy. He currently plays with Bat For Lashes and is the live drummer for Squarepusher.

== Discography ==
=== Albums ===
- Half Nelson (April 1998), Mantra. UK Independent Albums Chart: No. 28
- Every Six Seconds (March 2000), Mantra. UK Independent Albums Chart: No. 37

=== Singles ===
- "Gentlemen's Soiree" (August 1996), EXP
- "Salt Peter" (September 1996), EXP - tour single, split with Cable
- "Gracelands" (November 1996), EXP
- "Lovely Skin" (September 1997), Mantra
- "Oily Rag" (February 1998), Mantra. UK Independent Singles Chart: No. 45
- "Jackie O." (April 1998), Mantra. UK Independent Singles Chart: No. 26
- "Personal" (November 1998), Mantra
- "Angel Wings" (1999), Mantra. UK Independent Singles Chart: No. 41
- "Head of Safety" (2000), Mantra. UK Independent Singles Chart: No. 30
