= Spiby =

Spiby is a surname. Notable people with the surname include:

- Michael Spiby, Australian musician
- Sam Spiby (1877–1953), English footballer
- Pete Spiby, British musician with Groop Dogdrill and Black Spiders
