= Beachbuggy =

British rock group (1992–2006)

- Origin: Doncaster, England
- Genres: Rock & roll Punk rock Alternative rock
- Years active: 1992–2006
- Labels: Ostrich GT; Sympathy For The Record Industry; Poptones
- Past members: Jack Straker; Jim VeVee; Paul Dorrington; Keith Gregory; Daniel Jennings
- Website: TeamBB

Beachbuggy were a British rock group formed in early 1992 in Doncaster by Jack Straker (guitar/vocals), Jim VeVee (drums) and A.D (bass). The band's name reflected singer and main songwriter Jack Straker's obsession with classic cars, drag racing and Americana. Musically, their earliest influences were UK indie bands such as The Fall, The Wedding Present and Cud and American rock groups such as Buffalo Tom and Sonic Youth.

== Early history ==
Beachbuggy's first recordings were released as a three-track demo tape within weeks of the band forming in mid-1992 and were sold at early gigs, which took place throughout South Yorkshire and occasionally further afield. One of their biggest early gigs was at a special one-off show in Doncaster where headliners, Leeds band The Wedding Present, filmed a promo video for one of their 1992 'Hit parade' singles. This gig forged a link between the two bands which was to continue throughout the 1990s and beyond. Shortly after the release of their first demo tape A.D left to be replaced by Paul Maan - the first of many line-up changes.

The new line-up signalled a decisive change in musical policy - early songs are dropped and a more retro, rock 'n' roll sound, highly influenced by American 1960s surf music and garage rock emerged. Jack formed the self-funded label Ostrich GT and released the debut 7" single "Can't Get Enough", which showcased the band's rapidly developing Hot Rod aesthetic ("I've been around / The fuzz ran me downtown / They say I ran a red light / Oh well, I guess they were right"). The single sold well at early gigs and a follow-up was soon issued. "Chrysler 440" continued the street racing theme while B-side "Fuel Injection (it's better)" reflected Jack's knowledge of classic cars ("I got a big block Ford / It had a carburettor / Now I've got fuel injection / It's better"). Jack's occasional Ostrich Club nights held in various venues around Doncaster saw the band develop a loyal following and a growing reputation as they headlined their own gigs and supported some bigger names.

Between 1993 and 1995 gigs become more frequent and widespread and the initial local following grew as the band began to infiltrate the UK college circuit - often taking a group of loyal fans along to their gigs. In the process they played the first of the soon-to-be-infamous 'trailer' shows - turning up outside other bands' gigs and playing impromptu sets to the queuing crowds from the back of a truck or trailer. The trailer shows proved to be a great way of getting the band heard by larger crowds than would normally attend their gigs and soon the band were playing regular impromptu sets. A third single, "General Electric Pilot" saw another shift in emphasis with the production pre-empting the sound of their later two-drummer line-up and the addition of backing vocalist 'Rocket' Ron Haslam adding an extra sonic dimension.

== Unsafe.. At Any Speed ==
With little serious record company interest, the band took the initiative and made up a handful of demos of their latest recording "Firebird Special", sending them out to their favourite record labels. US company Sympathy for the Record Industry were one such label and they immediately issued "Firebird Special" as a 7" single in the US and followed it up with a full-length CD album "Unsafe.. At Any Speed". The album brought together their last couple of singles with a batch of new recordings and was a hit on the US underground/college circuit. As a result of this modest success, the band played a handful of US gigs but with no UK distribution and an indifferent UK music press, "Unsafe" failed to make a dent in the domestic market. A further single "Ya Just A Little Punk" followed, this time on indie 555 label, but the lack of success and nominal interest from the UK press may have prompted Jack to accept an offer to join The Wedding Present, first on bass and later on guitar.

== Sport Fury ==
Jack spent much of the period 1993 to 1996 touring and recording with The Wedding Present to the detriment of Beachbuggy, although the band still continued to gig sporadically. Upon leaving The Wedding Present in 1996 Jack returned to Beachbuggy with a renewed vigour. By now the band boasted two drummers - 'little' Bill Vevee (Jim's brother) and Johnny Napolis. The band took to wearing matching racing overalls on stage and undertook a series of raucous shows, one of which was witnessed by former Creation Records boss and current Poptones impresario Alan McGee. McGee offered to put out the band's first UK album, which they recorded at the Chicago studio of celebrated producer Steve Albini (Nirvana, Pixies, Big Black). The resultant album "Sport Fury" - the ultimate expression of the Beachbuggy ethos and the perfect balance between smart wit and cool attitude - was a critical success and exposed the band to a broader, national audience for the first time.

== Killer B ==
More gigs and positive press attention followed as the band racked up positive reviews in Kerrang! and NME and played live on TV for the first time to promote one of their ever-more-frequent London gigs. "Kickin' Back" and "From The South" were issued as 7" singles and the 5-track "Kickin' Back ep" collected the lead track, a couple of B-sides and some new songs on one CD. A third album followed shortly. Recorded again at Albini's Chicago studio over ten days "Killer-B" honed the band's sound, attitude and aesthetic further. "Killer Bee" and "Dirty Mouth" were obvious singles whilst the whole album - artistically at least - was a well accomplished success.

However, press attention was muted as Poptones failed to adequately promote the album. The momentum established by "Sport Fury" began to wane, sales were ultimately disappointing and the band parted company Poptones. Various band members came and went but a handful of shows nevertheless followed with line-ups varying from show-to-show. Original bassist A.D briefly returned on drums and they recorded and released "Nineteen" as one side of a split single with Huddersfield band The Scaramanga Six on Wrath Records. But by this point Jack had already begun spending more time with his new band Walker (which included two former Beachbuggy members).

== Final breakup ==
By 2005 however, Jack was back writing and playing with original Beachbuggy drummer Jim Vevee. Jim and Jack rehearsed a new batch of Beachbuggy songs and resurrected a number of old favourites. With a new bassist on board they began a short series of gigs which took in shows in their (now) hometown of Sheffield, and an explosive London show late in the year and a return to their roots playing the 'Pinstripes and Pistons' custom car show in April 2006. This however, was to prove to be the last ever Beachbuggy show as Jim left shortly after and Jack made the decision not to replace him and to concentrate full-time on new band Walker.

== Personnel: before and after Beachbuggy ==
- Jack Straker (real name Darren Belk) played guitar in Bungalow prior to forming Beachbuggy. He played bass and guitar with The Wedding Present between 1993 and 1996 and then in 2007 played bass and sang with Walker.
- Jim VeVee (real name Hugh Kelly) played with Beachbuggy from 1991 to 1996 and again from 2005 to 2006. He played with Groop Dogdrill from 1993 to 2000 and was an occasional member of The Wedding Present during 1996–97.
- A.D (real name Adrian Smelt) was in Bungalow with Jack prior to Beachbuggy. He played bass with Beachbuggy 1991 to 1992 and drums from 2003 to 2004. He now plays drums with Mystery Meat.
- 'little' Bill Vevee (real name Darren Ferris) played with Beachbuggy from 1995 to 2003. He has since played with Future eX-Wife and currently plays with Walker.
- Paul Dorrington played bass with Beachbuggy from 2003 to 2004. Paul played guitar with The Wedding Present from 1991 to 1995 and now plays guitar and sings with Walker.
- 'Rocket' Ron Haslam (real name Pete Spiby) played with Groop Dogdrill from 1993 to 2001 and with Beachbuggy from 1995 to 1999. After Groop Dogdrill Pete played with Future eX-Wife and is currently in Black Spiders.
- Al B Kirkey (real name Daniel Jennings) played guitar and sang in The Polar Bears in the early nineties with Francis Patrick Groves on backing vocals and ambient sounds. Daniel played bass with Beachbuggy from 2001 to 2005. Daniel also played bass with The Fontanelles from 2006 to 2010.

== Albums ==
Unsafe.. At Any Speed (CD album on Sympathy for the Record Industry. Cat. No: SFTRI539) 1998

- 1: Radio Ad
- 2: Kill Straker!
- 3: Heavy Hitter
- 4: General Electric Pilot
- 5: San Francisco
- 6: Hey! Jack
- 7: Firebird Special
- 8: Aluminum
- 9: Four Four O
- 10: Quarter Mile Machine
- 11: The Driver

Sport Fury (CD album on Poptones. Cat. No: MC5039CD) 2001

- 1: Kickin' Back
- 2: Bad Guys Wear Black
- 3: Touch My Stuff (You Can Die)
- 4: From The South
- 5: Science Fiction
- 6: Godspeed My Friend
- 7: It Might Be The Jets
- 8: The Fastest Time
- 9: Just A Little Punk
- 10: Cuba
- 11: Tom's Dead
- 12: Radio Ad (Italia)

Killer-B (CD album on Poptones. Cat. No: MC5080CD) 2003

- 1:
- 2: Killer Bee
- 3: Fire In My Eye
- 4: Oh Wow!
- 5: Strip City Heights
- 6: Strike!
- 7: Dirty Mouth
- 8: Easycome Easygo
- 9: Ah Oooh
- 10: The Hitt
- 11: Very Bad Thing
- 12: Deathray
- 13: Radio Ad (Japan)

== Singles ==
- Can't Get Enough b/w There's A Place (In My Heart) / G.T.O. (7" single on Ostrich G.T. Cat. No: GT1) 1992
- Chrysler 440 b/w Fuel Injection (it's better) / DeTomaso (7" single on Ostrich G.T. Cat. No: GT2) 1993
- General Electric Pilot b/w Bonneville / (We don't have) A Machine (7" single on Ostrich G.T. Cat. No: GT4) 1995
- Firebird Special / Midwest (7" single on Sympathy for the Record Industry. Cat. No: SFTRI499) 1997
- Ya Just A Little Punk b/w The Chauffeur (7" single on 555 Recordings. Cat. No: 55518) 1998
- Kickin' Back b/w I Got Root Bee (7" single / Limited promotional CD on Poptones. Cat. No: MC5056S / MC5056SP) 2001
- From The South b/w Infomation (7" Single / Limited promotional CD on Poptones. Cat. No: MC5056S / MC5056SP) 2001
- Kickin' Back EP: Kickin' Back / Ha! Ha! / Take A Ride / I Got Root Beer / Infomation (CD Single on Poptones. Cat. No: MC5072SCD) 2002
- Killer Bee / So Wholesome / Sheriff Is Law (CD Single on Poptones. Cat. No: MC5080SCD) 2003 #UK Independent Singles Chart: No. 30
- Dirty Mouth / Each Dawn I Die / Oh My God Oh My God (CD Single on Poptones. Cat. No: MC5086SCD) 2003
- The Scaramanga Six - The Poison Pen b/w Beachbuggy - Nineteen (Split 7" single on Wrath Records. Cat. No: WRATH15) 2004

== Other recordings ==
- I Can't Stand It / Inside Your head / You Look Dead Good (Demo tape: No label. No Cat. No.) 1992
- Firebird Special b/w Midwest (Demo tape on Ostrich G.T. Cat. No: GT5) 1996

== Compilations ==
- Knowing We Was Right From The Start (CD album on 555 Recordings includes the track Ya Just a Little Punk)
- The New Rock 'n' Roll (CD album on 3D includes the tracks Bad Guys Wear Black and I Got Root Beer.)
- New Blood - The New Rock 'n' Roll Volume Two (CD album on Artrocker includes the track The Driver)
- Death Disco (CD album on Discothèque includes the track Killer Bee)
- Radio4 Volume Two (Japan-only CD album on Poptone includes the track Kickin' Back)
- Box of Odd (CD album on Thee Sheffield Phonographic Corporation includes the tracks Death Ray & The Driver)
- Silver Rocket SR50 (CD album on Stupid Cat includes the track Nineteen)
- Wrath SuperSevens (CD album on Wrath Records only available to Supersevens Singles Club subscribers includes the track Nineteen)
