= Tommy (The Wedding Present album) =

Compilation album by The Wedding Present
- Released: 11 July 1988
- Recorded: 1985–1987, England
- Genre: Jangle pop, indie pop, post-punk
- Length: 37:46
- Label: Reception
- Producer: Carl Rosamond, The Wedding Present, Chris Allison

The Wedding Present chronology
George Best (1987)	Tommy (1988)	Українські Виступи в Івана Піла (1989)

Professional ratings
Review scores
Source	Rating
Allmusic	4.5/5 stars

Tommy is a compilation by The Wedding Present gathering their first four singles, their B-sides and selected tracks from two early radio sessions. It was released in July 1988 by their own record company, Reception Records.

== Overview ==
Tommy provides an overview of the band's output before its first album George Best. The production is relatively low fidelity but the songs are high-energy. All tracks of their first four singles are included except for "You Should Always Keep in Touch with Your Friends", the double A-side with "This Boy Can Wait", as the radio version was deemed superior. Similarly, all tracks of their first John Peel session are included but for the radio version of "This Boy Can Wait", whose single version was considered better.

By the time of their fourth single, "My Favourite Dress", the band had started working with Chris Allison, who went on to produce the band's George Best and Bizarro albums.

Two of the songs on Tommy made a reappearance on George Best: "What Becomes of the Broken-Hearted?", re-recorded under its new title of "It's What You Want That Matters", and "My Favourite Dress" with an added new coda.

== Track listing ==
All tracks written by David Gedge except for "Felicity"

=== Side A ===
1. "Go Out and Get 'Em Boy!" – 4:09
2. "(The Moment Before) Everything's Spoiled Again" – 3:19
3. "Once More" – 3:14
4. "At the Edge of the Sea" – 2:39
5. "Living and Learning" – 2:53
6. "This Boy Can Wait" – 4:01

=== Side B ===
1. "You Should Always Keep in Touch with Your Friends" – 3:01
2. "Felicity" (James Kirk) – 2:18
3. "What Becomes of the Broken Hearted?" – 3:46
4. "Never Said" – 2:37
5. "Every Mother's Son" – 1:36
6. "My Favourite Dress" – 4:13

Notes

- Tracks 1 and 2 were taken from the "Go Out and Get 'Em Boy!" single (1985)
- Tracks 3 and 4 were taken from the "Once More" single (1986)
- Track 5 was recorded during a BBC Radio 1 Andy Kershaw session
- Track 6 was taken from the "You Should Always Keep in Touch with Your Friends" single (1986)
- Tracks 7–9 were recorded during a John Peel session
- Tracks 10–12 were taken from the "My Favourite Dress" single (1987)

== Personnel ==
The Wedding Present

- David Gedge – vocals, guitar
- Peter Solowka – guitar
- Keith Gregory – bass guitar
- Shaun Charman – drums (A2–6, B1–6)

Additional musicians

- Julian Sowa – drums (A1)
- Mike Stout – guitar (B2)

Technical staff

- Carl Rosamond and The Wedding Present – producers (A1–4, A6)
- Clive Gregson – producer (A5)
- Mike Wilcojc – producer (B1–3)
- Chris Allison and The Wedding Present – producer (B4–6)
- Paul Smith – engineer (A5)
- Mike Robinson – engineer (B1–3)
