= Live 1992 =

Live 1992 may refer to:

- Live 1992 (Stéphane Grappelli album)
- Live 1992 (Shakespears Sister album)
- Den Haag 30 October 1992 by The Wedding Present; see The Wedding Present discography
- Mr. Big Live; see Mr. Big discography
