= Search for Paradise: Singles 2004–5 =

Search for Paradise: Singles 2004-5

Compilation album by The Wedding Present
- Released: (United States) May 16, 2006 (United Kingdom) May 29, 2006
- Recorded: Summer 2004
- Genre: Indie rock
- Length: 46:38
- Label: Scopitones (UK); Manifesto (US)
- Producer: Steve Fisk, David Gedge, Dare Mason

The Wedding Present chronology
Take Fountain (2005)	Search for Paradise: Singles 2004-5 (2006)	El Rey (2008)

Professional ratings
Review scores
Source	Rating
Allmusic	3/5 stars

Search for Paradise: Singles 2004–5 is a compilation album by The Wedding Present, collecting the single A-sides and B-sides from the band's album Take Fountain. It was released in the US on May 16, 2006, through Manifesto Records and on May 29, 2006, in the UK through Scopitones Records. The compilation also features unreleased acoustic versions of "Interstate 5", "I'm From Further North Than You" and "Ringway to SeaTac". The set includes a bonus DVD featuring music videos, behind-the-scenes footage and live performances.

== The singles ==
- "Interstate 5" (November 15, 2004)
- "I'm From Further North Than You" (April 11, 2005)
- "Ringway to SeaTac" (October 24, 2005)

== Track listing ==
CD:

1. "Interstate 5" (Original Version) - 6:07
2. "Bad Thing" - 3:00
3. "Snapshots" - 5:06
4. "I'm From Further North Than You" - 3:28
5. "Rekindling" - 2:12
6. "The Girl with the Curious Smile" - 4:16
7. "Nickels and Dimes" - 2:40
8. "I'm From Further North Than You" (Klee Remix) - 4:01
9. "Ringway to SeaTac" - 2:41
10. "Shivers" - 4:09
11. "American Tan" - 1:35
12. "Interstate 5" (Acoustic Version) - 2:45
13. "I'm From Further North Than You" (Acoustic Version) - 2:18
14. "Ringway to SeaTac" (Acoustic Version) - 2:30

DVD:

1. "Don't Touch That Dial" (Video)
2. "Interstate 5" (Video)
3. "I'm From Further North Than You" (Video)
4. "Ringway to SeaTac" (Video)
5. "Perfect Blue" (Live Acoustic Version) (Three Minute Film)
6. Behind the Scenes
