= Seamonsters =

1991 studio album by the Wedding Present

Studio album by The Wedding Present
- Released: 27 May 1991
- Recorded: 1991, United States
- Studio: Pachyderm (Cannon Falls, Minnesota)
- Genre: Indie rock, noise pop
- Length: 46:58
- Label: RCA
- Producer: Steve Albini

The Wedding Present chronology
Bizarro (1989)	Seamonsters (1991)	Hit Parade 1 (1992)

Seamonsters is the third studio album by English rock band the Wedding Present. It was recorded in ten days in 1991 by American producer Steve Albini at Pachyderm Studio in Cannon Falls, Minnesota. Albini had earlier recorded two EPs with the group; Brassneck and 3 Songs and, as with those records, Seamonsters has a rougher, harsher sound than the group's earlier two albums.

"Carolyn"
Excerpt from the track "Carolyn"

In deliberate contrast to the full sentences featured on previous recordings—something for which the group had often been parodied within the music press—all of the songs on Seamonsters have one-word titles. The album enjoyed a strongly positive critical reception. Guitarist Peter Solowka was sacked between the recording and release of the album, replaced by Paul Dorrington.

For the 35th anniversary of Seamonsters release, The Wedding Present set about a North American Tour in 2026, with musicians Rachael Wood on guitar, Stuart Hastings on bass, and Chris Hardwick, on drums.

== Reception ==
Professional ratings
Review scores
Source	Rating
AllMusic	5/5 stars
Chicago Tribune	2.5/4 stars
Classic Rock	8/10
Mojo	4/5 stars
NME	5/10
Q	3/5 stars
Record Collector	5/5 stars
Select	4/5
Uncut	9/10
Vox	9/10

Rockdelux ranked the album the 5th best album of the year on their year-end list. In 1999, Ned Raggett ranked the album at number 10 on his list of "The Top 136 Or So Albums Of The Nineties". Alternative Press ranked it #81 and #18 in their lists of "The 90 Greatest Albums of the 90s" and "Top 99 Albums of '85 to '95" respectively. Stylus ranked it at #200 on their "Top 101-200 Albums of All time" list. The Guardian included it on their list of "1000 Albums to Hear Before You Die". Rockdelux also ranked it at #46 on their list of "The 150 Best Albums from the 90s".

== Track listing ==
All songs written by David Gedge unless otherwise noted.

1. "Dalliance" – 4:24
2. "Dare" – 3:45
3. "Suck" – 3:58
4. "Blonde" – 5:07
5. "Rotterdam" – 3:15
6. "Lovenest" – 5:10
7. "Corduroy" – 3:28
8. "Carolyn" – 3:39
9. "Heather" – 3:32
10. "Octopussy" – 6:21

=== U.S. edition ===
In addition to the original ten tracks, this edition added three bonus tracks.

11. "Niagara" - 4:06
12. "Dan Dare" - 1:40
13. "Fleshworld" - 4:26

=== 2001 reissue ===
The album was remastered and reissued in 2001 with additional songs from the 3 Songs EP and the Dalliance and Lovenest singles.

11. "Make Me Smile (Come Up and See Me)" (Steve Harley) - 3:44
12. "Crawl" - 2:44
13. "Corduroy" (single version) - 3:23
14. "She's My Best Friend" (Lou Reed) - 2:55
15. "Niagara" - 4:06
16. "Mothers" (Jean-Paul Sartre Experience) - 2:56
17. "Dan Dare" - 1:40
18. "Fleshworld" - 4:26

== Personnel ==
- David Gedge - vocals, guitar
- Peter Solowka - guitar
- Keith Gregory - bass
- Simon Smith - drums
