= Mini (EP) =

EP by The Wedding Present
- Released: January 1996
- Recorded: 1995, England
- Genre: Post-punk
- Label: Cooking Vinyl

The Wedding Present chronology
Watusi (1994)	Mini (1996)	Saturnalia (1996)

Professional ratings
Review scores
Source	Rating
AllMusic	3.5/5 stars

Mini is a six-song EP by The Wedding Present. It was released in 1996 by Cooking Vinyl. All of the songs are about automobiles.

== Critical reception ==
The Washington Post praised the American version, Mini Plus, writing that the songs "typically combine terse, jumpy guitars with explosive drums and modest but effective hooks." The Chicago Reader wrote: "Over frenzied rhythms and smart guitar play, David Gedge croons an impressive array of hooks with enough eccentricity to make Morrissey sound like a shy mumbler."

== Track listing ==
All tracks written by Belk/Gedge/Smith.

1. Drive – 2:29
2. Love Machine – 3:52
3. Go, Man, Go – 2:23
4. Mercury – 4:20
5. Convertible – 2:14
6. Sports Car – 4:03

== People involved ==
- David Gedge - vocals, guitars, keyboards
- Darren Belk - guitars, bass
- Simon Smith - drums, percussion
- Jayne Lockey - extra vocals

== Mini Plus ==
The EP was issued as Mini Plus in America, with three extra tracks.

1. Sucker – 1:43
2. Waiting on the Guns – 3:20
3. Jet Girl – 2:25

"Sucker" written by Belk/Gedge/Smith. "Waiting on the Guns" written by Butterglory. "Jet Girl" written by Belk/Dorrington/Gedge/Smith.
