= Va Va Voom (disambiguation) =

"Va Va Voom" is a song by Nicki Minaj.

Va Va Voom or va-va-voom may also refer to:

- "Va Va Voom", a 1986 song by Ray Davies
- Va Va Voom (album), the 1998 debut album from Cinerama
- Vava Voom, a 2012 album by Bassnector
- A term used in Renault Clio commercials

== See also ==
- "Va Va Va Voom", 1954 song by Art Carney
- "Va Va Va Voom", 1974 song by Brett Smiley
- Vavoom (disambiguation)
