= Va Va Voom (album) =

Studio album by Cinerama
- Released: 1998
- Studios: Intimate, London E1; Moody, Acton, London; The Premises, Hackney, London; Oaklands Groove
- Genre: Indie rock
- Labels: Cooking Vinyl; SpinART
- Producers: Dare Mason, David Gedge

Cinerama chronology
Va Va Voom (1998)	Disco Volante (2000)

Va Va Voom is the debut album by the English indie rock band Cinerama, released in 1998.

The album peaked at No. 93 on the UK Albums Chart.

== Production ==
Va Va Voom was produced by Dare Mason and David Gedge. Gedge was interested in a more orchestral sound than he had employed with the Wedding Present; he was able to accomplish it due to technological advances in recording software. Va Va Voom marked the first time that Gedge worked on an album with his then-partner, Sally Murrell.

Emma Pollock and Marty Willson-Piper contributed to the album.

== Critical reception ==
Professional ratings
Review scores
Source	Rating
AllMusic	4/5 stars
The Independent	2/4 stars
Pittsburgh Post-Gazette	3.5/4 stars
The Times	8/10

The Stranger wrote that Gedge's voice "sounds mellower, more restrained than in the Wedding Present; the presence of Sally Murrell's gentile backing vocals lend an almost Franco-pop edge, the keyboards sweetened even further by blasts of trumpet and the odd lustful refrain." Trouser Press thought that "while Gedge and Murrell harmonize, vocals are deemphasized, and his typically surprising rhymes are AWOL." The Independent opined that "the melodic lightness of touch becomes irritatingly whimsical by 'You Turn Me On'."

The Toronto Star stated that "cellos, violins, flutes and the odd oboe mingle in articulate, softly strummed arrangements that soundcheck everything from '60s pop and '70s soul to the Burt Bacharach oeuvre." The Pittsburgh Post-Gazette declared that "this is rainy-day pop at its melodramatic best, with all the wounded self-absorption fans have come to ask ... of Wedding Present frontman David Gedge (but without all the raging guitars)." The Hartford Courant deemed the album "a wonderfully luscious collection of orchestrated, lovelorn pop that couldn't be more different from the tangled wall of guitars that usually marks the Wedding Present."

AllMusic called the album "classic, often theatrical pop that refreshingly escapes self-consciousness just by being itself, while retaining a strummed guitar at the center of things." The Stuart News listed it as one 1998's best "underheard" albums.

== Track listing ==
All tracks are written by David Lewis Gedge.

No.	Title	Length
1.	"Maniac"	3:46
2.	"Comedienne"	3:08
3.	"Hate"	3:19
4.	"Kerry Kerry"	2:31
5.	"Barefoot in the Park"	4:06
6.	"You Turn Me On"	3:00
7.	"Ears"	3:47
8.	"Me Next"	3:23
9.	"Hard, Fast and Beautiful"	4:58
10.	"Dance, Girl, Dance"	3:31
11.	"Honey Rider"	3:58
