= Valentina (album) =

Studio album by the Wedding Present
- Released: 19 March 2012 (UK)
- Recorded: Summer/autumn 2011, France, Los Angeles, Brighton
- Genre: Indie pop
- Length: 45:55
- Label: Scopitones
- Producer: Andrew Scheps, The Wedding Present, Peter Deimel, David Odlum, Ulysses Noriega

The Wedding Present chronology
El Rey (2008)	Valentina (2012)	Going, Going... (2016)

Valentina is the eighth studio album by English rock band the Wedding Present. It was released in the UK on 19 March 2012 by their record label, Scopitones. The North America release date was 20 March 2012, Japan 21 March 2012 and Oceania 23 March 2012.

== Background ==
Valentina came four years after the band's previous album, El Rey. It was the first album since Saturnalia not to feature Terry de Castro on bass, although she did provide a few backing vocals. The album was produced by Andrew Scheps, who had previously worked with bands including U2, Red Hot Chili Peppers and Adele. Included in the eleven tracks is the only single to be taken from the album, "You Jane", which was released as a single on 30 January 2012. In May 2015 Valentina was re-recorded by David Gedge's other band Cinerama.

== Reception ==
Professional ratings
Review scores
Source	Rating
AllMusic	3.5/5 stars
Pitchfork	6.9/10 stars
Record Collector	3/5 stars

Mischa Pearlman of Record Collector said the album had Gedge in "fiery form, dishing out self-deprecating bilious invective with aplomb", adding that the "key to the success" with his lyrics lay in their "simplicity and their sardonic, sneering delivery".

== Track listing ==
All tracks written by David Gedge and Graeme Ramsay, except track 7 by Gedge and Terry de Castro.

1. You're Dead - 5:46
2. You Jane - 3:06
3. Meet Cute - 3:48
4. Back a Bit... Stop - 3:16
5. Stop Thief! - 3:36
6. The Girl from the DDR - 4:00
7. Deer Caught in the Headlights - 5:25
8. 524 Fidelio - 3:07
9. End Credits - 4:10
10. Mystery Date - 5:32
11. Pain Perdu - 4:09 [only on digital download]

== Personnel ==
The Wedding Present

- David Gedge - vocals, guitar, percussion
- Graeme Ramsay - guitars, piano, harmonium & second drum kit on track 9
- Pepe le Moko - bass, backing vocals
- Charles Layton - drums, percussion

with:

- Terry de Castro - backing vocals on tracks 2 and 8
- Sayaka Amano - Japanese narration on track 10
