= Cha Cha Cohen =

British band

Cha Cha Cohen was a band formed in 1994 by three members of The Wedding Present — Keith Gregory, Paul Dorrington and Simon Smith. After recruiting singer Jacqui Cohen (AKA Jaqi Dulany) from The Dustdevils they released a single, "Sparky's Note", on Hemiola Records.

In 1996 they released their first record on Chemikal Underground Records and in 1998 released a self-titled album when keyboard player Alan Thomas joining the group.

In 1999 Paul Dorrington left and was replaced by Tanya Mellot. Their last album All Artists Are Criminals was released in 2001, after which Gregory and Cohen, having married, emigrated to Australia and effectively broke up the group. The Guardian compared the music on this album to The Fall and gave it four stars out of five.
