= Hug Kelly =

British drummer

Hugh "Hug" Kelly is an English rock drummer best known for his tenure with Groop Dogdrill between 1993 and 2000.

Born Hugh Kevin Kelly in Askern, a suburb of Doncaster, UK, Kelly played drums in various school and community bands before eventually joining short-lived indie rock/shoegazing bands Honey Haze and Heathers in the late 1980s/early 1990s. His departure from Heathers was assured when he accepted an offer from Darren Belk to join Beachbuggy in early 1991, for which Kelly adopted the pseudonym Jim VeVee.

Kelly continued to work with Beachbuggy after joining the metal/punk band Groop Dogdrill in 1993 who eventually enjoyed considerable success in the UK and United States. Unable to commit to both bands Kelly quit Beachbuggy shortly after the release of their debut US-only CD album Unsafe... At Any Speed in 1998.

He was an occasional/unofficial member of The Wedding Present (with whom Darren Belk was now playing guitar) during 1996-97 during which time the band experimented with two drummers. Kelly recorded one single, ("2, 3, Go") with the band and appeared on one Peel Session in between numerous live concert and festival appearances, alternating between keyboards and drums at several shows (he is heard in such a role on the Complete Peel Sessions box set).

Meanwhile, Groop Dogdrill released the albums Half Nelson (1998) and Every Six Seconds (2000) before Kelly chose to leave after Mantra Records declined to renew the band's contract at the end of 2000. Thereafter he largely retreated from the music business, having married and settled in Sheffield, but briefly returned to play with a re-formed Beachbuggy from 2005 to 2006.

== Discography: albums ==
- Groop Dogdrill: Half Nelson (CD, 1998)
- Beachbuggy: Unsafe... At Any Speed (CD, 1998)
- Groop Dogdrill: Every Six Seconds (CD, 2000)
- The Wedding Present: The Complete Peel Sessions 1986-2004 (6-CD box set, 2007)
