= Hugh Kelly =

Hugh Kelly may refer to:

- Hugh Kelly (poet) (1739–1777), Irish dramatist and poet
- Hughie Kelly (1923–2009), Scottish football player and manager
- Hugh Kelly (footballer, born 1919) (1919–1977), Northern Irish international football goalkeeper
- Hugh Craine Kelly (1848–1891), South Australian politician
- Hug Kelly (born Hugh Kelly), English rock drummer
- Hugh A. Kelly Jr., American politician

== See also ==
- Hugh Kelley (disambiguation)
