= The Complete Peel Sessions 1986–2004 =

2007 compilation of songs by The Wedding Present recorded with John Peel

Live album by The Wedding Present with John Peel
- Released: 2007
- Recorded: 1986–2004
- Label: Castle Music

The Complete Peel Sessions is a collection of songs by The Wedding Present recorded with John Peel. The album was released in 2007 on Castle Music.
