= El Rey (The Wedding Present album) =

Studio album by The Wedding Present
- Released: May 20, 2008 (US), May 26, 2008 (UK)
- Recorded: January 2008
- Studio: Electrical Audio, The Laundry Room
- Genre: Indie rock
- Length: 45:32
- Label: Manifesto (US), Vibrant (UK)
- Producer: Steve Albini, The Wedding Present, Pete Magdaleno

The Wedding Present chronology
Search for Paradise: Singles 2004-5 (2006)	El Rey (2008)	Valentina (2012)

Singles from El Rey
- 1. "The Thing I Like Best About Him Is His Girlfriend" Released: May 5, 2008

Professional ratings
Review scores
Source	Rating
Allmusic	3.5/5 stars
NME	(8/10) (05/24/2008, p.39)
Cosmos Gaming	

El Rey is the seventh studio album by The Wedding Present. It was released in the US on May 20, 2008, by Manifesto Records, and on May 26, 2008, in the UK by Vibrant Records/Pinnacle Records. The album was the band's first album since 2005's Take Fountain. El Rey was preceded by the first single "The Thing I Like Best About Him Is His Girlfriend" as a digital download only.

== Production ==
The Wedding Present arranged new material at Swing House and Cole Studios, both in Hollywood, California, and at Q10 in Glenrothes, Scotland. El Rey was produced by Steve Albini, the band, and Pete Magdaleno. Sessions were held in January 2008 at Electrical Audio in Chicago, Illinois, with Albini handling recording. Additional overdubs were done at The Laundry Room in Los Angeles, California, with Magdaleno handling recording, assisted by Ulysses Noriega. Albini mixed the album at Electrical Audio; Castro sequenced the album, before it was mastered by John Golden at Golden Sounds in Ventura, California, with assistance from JJ Golden.

== Track listing ==
Track listing per booklet.

1. "Santa Ana Winds" (Gedge, Castro) - 3:56
2. "Spider-Man on Hollywood" (Gedge, McConville) - 3:30
3. "I Lost the Monkey" (Gedge, Cleave) - 3:50
4. "Soup" (Gedge, Ramsay) - 3:49
5. "Palisades" (Gedge, Castro) - 3:51
6. "The Trouble with Men" (Gedge, Ramsay) - 5:22
7. "Model, Actress, Whatever..." (Gedge, Castro) - 3:58
8. "Don't Take Me Home Until I'm Drunk" (Gedge, McConville) - 3:07
9. "The Thing I Like Best About Him Is His Girlfriend" (Santa Monica and La Brea Version) (Gedge, Castro) - 4:34
10. "Boo Boo" (Gedge, Castro) - 6:23
11. "Swingers" (Gedge, Cleave) - 3:05
12. "Back for Good" (Exclusive Bonus Track) - 4:41 - iTunes Store only, cover of a Take That track

== Personnel ==
Personnel per booklet.

The Wedding Present

- David Gedge – lead vocals, guitars, mellotron
- Christopher McConville – guitars, Hammond organ, mellotron
- Terry de Castro – bass guitar, backing vocals, Hammond organ, lead vocals (track 11)
- Graeme Ramsay – drums, percussion, mellotron

Production and design

- Steve Albini – recording, mixing, producer
- The Wedding Present – producer
- Pete Magdaleno – producer, additional overdub recording
- Ulysses Noriega – additional overdub assistant
- Terry de Castro – sequenced
- John Golden – mastering
- JJ Golden – mastering assistant
- Egelnick and Webb – sleeve design
- J. Antoinette McMillan – photography
