= Vavoom =

Vavoom may refer to:

== TV ==
- Miss Vavoom, character in 1990–1993 American television series Tom & Jerry Kids
- Vavoom, character in 1959–1961 American television series Felix the Cat
- Vavoom (TV channel) airing in Balkan countries

== Music ==
- "Vavoom: Ted the Mechanic", 1996 song by British band Deep Purple
- Vavoom!, 2000 album by American band The Brian Setzer Orchestra
- "Vavoom", song from Resident. Two Years of Oakenfold at Cream.
- "Vavoom", song by Prince from The Chocolate Invasion

== See also ==
- Va Va Voom (disambiguation)
