= Take Fountain =

Studio album by The Wedding Present
- Released: 14 February 2005
- Recorded: Summer 2004
- Studios: Robert Lang (Shoreline, Washington); Philosophy of the World Recording; Electrical Audio (Chicago, Illinois)
- Genre: Indie rock
- Length: 46:44
- Label: Scopitones
- Producer: Steve Fisk

The Wedding Present chronology
| Saturnalia (1996) | Take Fountain (2005) | Search for Paradise: Singles 2004–5 (2006) |

Singles from Take Fountain
- 1. "Interstate 5" Released: 15 November 2004; 2. "I'm from Further North Than You" Released: 11 April 2005; 3. "Ringway to Seatac" Released: 24 October 2005

Professional ratings
Review scores
| Source | Rating |
|---|---|
| Allmusic | 3.5/5 stars |
| Pitchfork | 6.9/10 stars |

Take Fountain is the sixth studio album by The Wedding Present. It was released in the UK on 14 February 2005, through Scopitones Records, and a day later in the US through Manifesto Records.

== Background ==
David Gedge originally recorded Take Fountain as the fourth Cinerama album, but after the break-up of his relationship with fellow Cinerama founder Sally Murrell, Gedge decided that this darker record should be released under his Wedding Present name. Take Fountain is the band's first album release since 1996's Saturnalia, and returns to the noisy, jangly, intelligent indie sound of old.

Take Fountain was recorded in the United States at Robert Lang Studios in Shoreline, Washington, at Philosophy of the World Recording in Seattle, Washington, and at Electrical Audio in Chicago, Illinois in mid-2004. Steve Fisk acted as producer and engineer, with additional production from Gedge and guitarist Simon Cleave. Justin Armstrong and Greg Man did additional engineering. Fisk mixed the wordings, before they were mastered by Noel Summerville at Transfermation in London.

== Charts ==
The album reached number 68 in the UK chart, after all of Cinerama's albums had failed to chart other than the debut which only reached number 93.

== Title ==
In Los Angeles, Fountain Avenue is a minor east-west street, between and parallel to Sunset Boulevard and Santa Monica Boulevard, two very congested arteries. According to a common tale, Bette Davis was once asked what the best way an aspiring starlet could get into Hollywood was, and reportedly replied without hesitation, "Take Fountain!"

== Track listing ==
All the songs were written by David Gedge and Simon Cleave.

1. "On Ramp" – 2:03
2. "Interstate 5" (extended version) – 8:06
3. "Always the Quiet One" – 3:20
4. "I'm from Further North Than You" – 3:39
5. "Mars Sparkles Down on Me" – 4:14
6. "Ringway to Seatac" – 2:41
7. "Don't Touch That Dial" (Pacific Northwest version) – 6:18
8. "It's for You" – 3:16
9. "Larry's" – 3:39
10. "Queen Anne" – 4:05
11. "Perfect Blue" – 5:31

== Personnel ==
Personnel per booklet.

The Wedding Present

- David Gedge – vocals, guitar, percussion, orchestral arrangements
- Simon Cleave – guitar
- Terry de Castro – bass, backing vocals
- Kari Paavola – drums, percussion

Additional musicians

- Steve Fisk – vibraphone, glockenspiel, mellotron, organ, piano
- Jen Kozel – violin
- Stephen Cresswell – viola
- Lori Goldston – cello
- Don Crevie – French horn
- Jeff McGrath – trumpet

Production and design

- Steve Fisk – producer, engineer, mixing
- David Gedge – additional production
- Simon Cleave – additional production
- Justin Armstrong – additional engineering
- Greg Norman – additional engineering
- Noel Summervile – mastered
- Hak Bo Lee – piano technician
- Egelnick and Webb – sleeve design
- Lincoln Carmen Mongillo III – photography
