= Hugh Kelley =

Hugh Kelley may refer to:

- Hugh Kelley (screenwriter) of Cage (film) and Warriors of Virtue
- Captain Hugh A. Kelley, namesake of Kelley Massif

== See also ==
- Hugh Kelly (disambiguation)
