= Ukrainian John Peel Sessions =

Українські Виступи в Івана Піла

Compilation album by The Wedding Present
- Released: February 1989
- Recorded: 1986–1988, England
- Genre: Folk music
- Length: 36:22 (re-release)
- Label: RCA
- Producer: Dale Griffin

The Wedding Present chronology
Tommy (1988)	Українські Виступи в Івана Піла (1989)	Bizarro (1989)

Professional ratings
Review scores
Source	Rating
NME	8/10 (November 12, 1988) link
NME	9/10 (February 1989) link
Allmusic	(1989 release) link
Allmusic	(2000 re-release) link

Ukrainian John Peel Sessions (Ukrainian: Українські Виступи в Івана Піла, romanized: Ukrainski vistupi v Ivana Pila) is a compilation album by The Wedding Present, originally gathering their first three Ukrainian language John Peel radio sessions. It was scheduled to be released in late 1988 by their own record company, Reception Records, but was ultimately released in February 1989 by their new record label RCA.

== About the album ==
=== Origins ===
The Wedding Present guitarist Peter Solowka, whose father is Ukrainian, used to play a Ukrainian folk tune called "Hopak" to entertain his friends. When he did so during a radio session the band was recording for the BBC Radio 1 John Peel show, they decided to record the song for the session. The song was received well and, fired by Solowka's enthusiasm, the band decided to dedicate another Peel session to Ukrainian folk songs. Because none of them could sing Ukrainian to any acceptable degree, they decided to invite fellow Leeds musician "The Legendary" Len Liggins of The Sinister Cleaners, who had read Russian at University, to sing and play various instruments.

The resulting Peel session's broadcast provoked a reaction from Roman Remeynes of Hang the Dance!, himself fluent in Ukrainian, who jokingly accused the band of bastardising the music. This led to him being invited to join as well for a second Ukrainian-themed Peel session. By this time, original Wedding Present drummer Shaun Charman had been replaced with Simon Smith, coincidentally an ex-Sinister Cleaner himself.

=== Aborted Reception Records release ===
The band intended to release a compilation of the first and second Peel sessions as Українські Виступи в Івана Піла on their independent record label Reception Records, whose distribution was handled by Red Rhino, a York-based division of the independent UK distribution network, The Cartel. Red Rhino issued a radio promo of "Davni Chasy" and pressed a batch of the LP for release in late 1988, but went into receivership before it could actually release the album. Prompted by the demise of their backers, The Wedding Present decided to fold their own record label and sign with a regular record company. Of the original pressing (catalogue number REC010), a small number of copies managed to leave the warehouse; these are nowadays sought after.

=== RCA release ===
The company The Wedding Present signed with was RCA, which immediately bought up the Red Rhino batch of the album and pressed a new batch themselves. Українські Виступи в Івана Піла was released in February 1989, backed with a new pressing of the "Davni Chasy" promo. RCA pleaded with the band to have a regular release of the song, better known as "Those Were the Days My Friend", which they were sure would provide them with a Top Ten hit. The band, however, refused. Українські Виступи в Івана Піла reached #22 in the UK albums charts.

After the album's release, the band went on a short British tour that was well received. Bolstered by the success, they recorded a third Ukrainian Peel session. After that, the Ukrainian phase in The Wedding Present's career was over, but Liggins, Remeynes and Solowka decided to continue playing together as The Ukrainians. Their 1991 eponymous debut album features contributions by all Wedding Present band members.

=== Re-release ===
In 2000, independent record label Fresh Ear Records re-released Українські Виступи в Івана Піла, changing its Latin-alphabet subtitle to Ukrainian John Peel Sessions. The re-release also includes the third Peel session and "Hopak", the song with which it all began, and so compiles all Ukrainian-themed songs recorded by The Wedding Present.

The 6 CD box set The Complete Peel Sessions also contains all of the Ukrainian songs.

Peter Solowka went on to play these and other songs in his new group, The Ukrainians.

== Track listing ==
All tracks traditional, arranged by David Gedge, except as noted.

=== Original release ===
Side A
No.	Title	Length
1.	"Давні Часи" (Davni Chasy, Those Were the Days)	2:56
2.	"Їхав Козак за Дунай" (Yikhav Kozak za Dunai)	2:23
3.	"Тютюнник" (Tiutiunyk)	1:20
4.	"Задумав Дідочок" (Zadumav Didochok)	2:06
5.	"Світить Місяць" (Svitit Misyats)	2:29
Total length:		11:14

Side B
No.	Title	Length
1.	"Катруся" (Katrusya)	2:32
2.	"Вася – Васильок" (Vasya Vasyl'ok)	2:49
3.	"Гуде Дніпро Гуде" (Hude Dnipro Hude, written by Mikhailo Kuziw)	2:23
4.	"Верховино" (Verkhovyno)	7:17
Total length:		15:01

=== Re-release ===
No.	Title	Length
1.	"Давні Часи" (Davni Chasy, Those Were the Days)	2:56
2.	"Через Річку Через Гай" (Cherez Richku Cherez Hai, written by Liggins, Remeynes and Solowka)	3:17
3.	"Світить Місяць" (Svitit Misyats)	2:29
4.	"Тютюнник" (Tiutiunyk)	1:20
5.	"Задумав Дідочок" (Zadumav Didochok)	2:06
6.	"Їхав Козак за Дунай" (Yikhav Kozak za Dunai)	2:23
7.	"Гуде Дніпро Гуде" (Hude Dnipro Hude, written by Mikhailo Kuziw)	2:23
8.	"Катруся" (Katrusya)	2:32
9.	"Вася – Васильок" (Vasya Vasyl'ok)	2:49
10.	"Серцем і Душею" (Sertsem i Dusheyu, written by Liggins, Remeynes and Solowka)	1:56
11.	"Завтра" (Zavtra)	3:21
12.	"Гопак" (Hopak)	1:27
13.	"Верховино" (Verkhovyno)	7:17
Total length:		36:16

== Personnel ==
The Wedding Present

- Peter Solowka – accordion, mandolin, tambourine, backing vocals; lead guitar on "Hopak"
- David Gedge – rhythm guitar, backing vocals
- Keith Gregory – bass guitar
- Shaun Charman – drums (3–4, 6–8, 12)
- Simon Smith – drums (1–2, 5, 9–11, 13)

Additional musicians

- Len Liggins – vocals, violin, balalaika, flute (1–11, 13)
- Roman Remeynes – vocals, mandolin (1–2, 5, 9–11, 13)

Technical staff

- Dale Griffin – producer
- Mike Engels – engineer (12)
- Miti Adhikari – engineer (12)
- Mike Robinson – engineer (1–11, 13)
- Fred Kay – engineer (3–4, 6–8)

== Sources ==
- Peter Solowka, liner notes to the original release and updated version for the Fresh Ear re-release
- Mark Hodkinson, Thank Yer, Very Glad, 1990 (ISBN 0-7119-2106-7)
