= Watusi (album) =

1994 studio album by the Wedding Present

Studio album by The Wedding Present
- Released: 12 September 1994
- Genre: Alternative rock, indie rock
- Length: 41:40
- Label: Island
- Producer: Steve Fisk

The Wedding Present chronology
Hit Parade 2 (1993)	Watusi (1994)	Saturnalia (1996)

Professional ratings
Review scores
Source	Rating
AllMusic	4.5/5 stars
The Encyclopedia of Popular Music	3/5 stars
MusicHound Rock: The Essential Album Guide	3/5 stars

Watusi is a studio album by The Wedding Present. It was released in 1994 on Island Records. It peaked at No. 47 on the UK Albums chart.

Watusi was re-issued by Edsel Records in 2014; the band played the album in its entirety during their autumn 2014 UK tour.

Watusi was re-issued once again in 2024 by Island / Universal Music in a deluxe edition which featured the b-sides from the two singles plus the Versions 10" outtakes EP. The band played the album in its entirety during several of their 2024 concerts.

== Production ==
The album was produced by Steve Fisk. Beat Happening's Heather Lewis guested on two tracks.

== Critical reception ==
Trouser Press wrote: "Frequently slow and spare, letting small-scale instrumental restraint release Gedge’s most luminous melodies and performances, the album is a surprising charmer — except in the lyrics of songs that shrug off guilt while acknowledging its validity." Clash deemed it "a curiously 1960s-flecked, garage-pop album." Spin called Watusi "a dream-pop album that obsesses instead of dreams."

== Track listing ==
1. "So Long, Baby" – 2:28
2. "Click Click" – 4:28
3. "Yeah Yeah Yeah Yeah Yeah" – 3:15
4. "Let Him Have It" – 3:01
5. "Gazebo" – 3:08
6. "Shake It" – 3:03
7. "Spangle" – 3:15
8. "It's a Gas" – 3:31
9. "Swimming Pools, Movie Stars" – 3:09
10. "Big Rat" – 3:39
11. "Catwoman" – 7:09
12. "Hot Pants" – 2:03

All songs written by Belk/Dorrington/Gedge/Smith, except tracks 1 and 11 written by Belk/Dorrington/Gedge/Gregory/Smith and track 4 written by Dorrington/Gedge/Gregory/Smith.

== Personnel ==
The Wedding Present

- David Gedge - vocals, guitar
- Paul Dorrington - guitar
- Darren Belk - bass, "Shake It" vocals
- Simon Smith - drums

Additional musicians

- Carrie Akre - extra vocals [tracks 5 & 8]
- Heather Lewis - extra vocals [tracks 2 & 9]
- Greg Powers - trombone
- Steve Fisk - piano, organ, guitar
