= Bizarro (album) =

Studio album by The Wedding Present
- Released: 23 October 1989
- Recorded: 1989, England
- Genre: Indie rock, post-punk, pop-punk, noise pop
- Length: 46:58
- Label: RCA
- Producer: Chris Allison

The Wedding Present chronology
Українські Виступи в Івана Піла (1989)	Bizarro (1989)	Seamonsters (1991)

Professional ratings
Review scores
Source	Rating
AllMusic	4/5 stars
Chicago Tribune	4/4 stars
NME	6/10
Q	4/5 stars
Record Collector	5/5 stars
Record Mirror	4/5

Bizarro is the second studio album by The Wedding Present. It was released in October 1989 by their record label, RCA.

== About the album ==
The Wedding Present's second studio album—and first "proper" album for RCA—came soon after the Ukrainian John Peel Sessions / Українські Виступи в Івана Піла folk music side project.

Technically speaking, only one single was taken from the album, "Kennedy", which provided the band with their first Top 40 hit, reaching #33. In early 1990, The Wedding Present re-recorded "Brassneck" with Steve Albini, which reached #24 in the UK charts. The single and its B-sides were later included on U.S. release of the album, and are also included on the Singles 1989-1991 compilation. The US CD version contains the Wedding Present's cover of "Box Elder", an early song by then unknown American band Pavement. A remastered CD version, released by BMG Camden in 2001, also features the B-sides of the "Kennedy" single, including a cover version of the Tom Jones hit "It's Not Unusual".

== Track listing ==
All tracks written by David Gedge (unless otherwise noted).

=== Side A ===
1. "Brassneck" – 4:51
2. "Crushed" – 2:32
3. "No" – 4:11
4. "Thanks" – 2:22
5. "Kennedy" – 4:20
6. "What Have I Said Now?" – 5:18

=== Side B ===
1. "Granadaland" – 4:50
2. "Bewitched" – 6:42
3. "Take Me!" – 9:15
4. "Be Honest" – 2:37

=== US CD release ===
1. "Brassneck" [original version] – 4:52
2. "Crushed" – 2:32
3. "No" – 4:11
4. "Thanks" – 2:22
5. "Kennedy" – 4:20
6. "What Have I Said Now?" – 5:18
7. "Granadaland" – 4:50
8. "Bewitched" – 6:42
9. "Take Me!" – 9:15
10. "Brassneck" [Steve Albini version] – 4:22
11. "Box Elder" (written by Pavement) – 2:14
12. "Don't Talk Just Kiss" – 3:20
13. "Gone" – 2:42
14. "Be Honest" – 2:37

=== UK remastered CD ===
1. "Brassneck" [original version] – 4:52
2. "Crushed" – 2:32
3. "No" – 4:11
4. "Thanks" – 2:22
5. "Kennedy" – 4:20
6. "What Have I Said Now?" – 5:18
7. "Granadaland" – 4:50
8. "Bewitched" – 6:42
9. "Take Me!" – 9:15
10. "Be Honest" – 2:37
11. "Unfaithful" – 3:21
12. "One Day This Will All Be Yours" – 2:02
13. "It's Not Unusual" (Les Reed and Gordon Mills) – 2:09
14. "Brassneck" (Steve Albini version) – 4:22
15. "Don't Talk Just Kiss" – 3:20
16. "Gone" – 2:42
17. "Box Elder" (written by Stephen Malkmus of Pavement) – 2:14

== Personnel ==
The Wedding Present

- David Gedge – vocals, guitar
- Peter Solowka – guitar
- Keith Gregory – bass guitar
- Simon Smith – drums

Additional musicians

- Amelia Fletcher – backing vocals

Technical staff

- Chris Allison – producer
- Steve Lyon – engineer

Artwork

- The Designers Republic

== Charts ==
Chart (2026)	Peak position
Greek Albums (IFPI)	60
