= Going, Going... =

Studio album by The Wedding Present
- Released: 2 September 2016
- Recorded: 2015–16, Studios La Fabrique (Saint-Rémy-de-Provence), Parr Street Studios (Liverpool)
- Genre: Indie rock, post-rock
- Length: 73:40
- Label: Scopitones
- Producer: Andrew Scheps

The Wedding Present chronology
Valentina (2012)	Going, Going... (2016)

Professional ratings
Review scores
Source	Rating
AllMusic	3.5/5 stars
The A.V. Club	8/10 stars
Drowned in Sound	8/10 stars
Louder Than War	9/10 stars
PopMatters	8/10 stars

Going, Going... is the ninth studio album by English rock band The Wedding Present. It was released on 2 September 2016 in the UK and 2 December 2016 in the US, by their record label, Scopitones. It is a 20-song double multimedia album – each song has its own video included – that is also a travelogue about a journey across North America.

== Background ==
Going, Going... came four years after the band's previous album, Valentina. David Gedge had decided that he didn't want the next album to be "just another album" and decided on a format of a number of interconnected pieces. In 2014 he travelled across America with photographer Jessica McMillan and made a number of films. After that, says Gedge, it was a case of "progressing through the music, trying all sorts of ideas, seeing how they work set against the visuals."

== Track listing ==
Going, Going... track listing
No.	Title	Length	Writer(s)	Related location
1	Kittery	5:31	David Gedge, Samuel Beer-Pearce, Charlie Layton	Kittery, Maine
2	Greenland	3:00	Gedge, Layton	Greenland, New Hampshire
3	Marblehead	3:49	Gedge, Beer-Pearce, Layton	Marblehead, Massachusetts
4	Sprague	2:42	Gedge	Sprague, Connecticut
5	Two Bridges	3:58	Gedge, Patrick Alexander, Layton	Two Bridges, Manhattan in New York City
6	Little Silver	4:39	Gedge, Alexander, Layton	Little Silver, New Jersey
7	Bear	4:18	Gedge, Alexander, Layton	Bear, Delaware
8	Secretary	2:01	Gedge, Alexander, Layton	Secretary, Maryland
9	Birdsnest	3:35	Gedge, Alexander, Layton	Birdsnest, Virginia
10	Kill Devil Hills	2:25	Gedge, Alexander, Layton	Kill Devil Hills, North Carolina
11	Bells	3:33	Gedge, Alexander, Beer-Pearce, Layton	Bells, Tennessee
12	Fifty-Six	4:39	Gedge, Alexander, Layton	Fifty-Six, Arkansas
13	Fordland	2:50	Gedge, Alexander, Beer-Pearce, Layton	Fordland, Missouri
14	Emporia	4:29	Gedge, Beer-Pearce, Layton	Emporia, Kansas
15	Broken Bow	2:39	Gedge, Alexander, Beer-Pearce, Layton	Broken Bow, Nebraska
16	Lead	2:50	Gedge, Alexander, Beer-Pearce, Layton	Lead, South Dakota
17	Ten Sleep	2:11	Gedge, Beer-Pearce, Layton	Ten Sleep, Wyoming
18	Wales	4:27	Gedge, Alexander, Beer-Pearce, Layton, Andrew Teilo	Wales, Utah
19	Rachel	3:42	Gedge, Alexander, Beer-Pearce, Layton	Rachel, Nevada
20	Santa Monica	6:22	Gedge, Alexander, Beer-Pearce, Layton	Santa Monica, California

== Personnel ==
The Wedding Present

- David Gedge - vocals, guitar, mellotron, waterphone
- Samuel Beer-Pearce - guitars, keyboards, vocals
- Katharine Wallinger - bass, backing vocals
- Charles Layton - drums, percussion

with:

- Teo Benson - violin
- Terry de Castro - vocals
- Steve Fisk - keyboards
- Annie Ford - viola
- Paul Hiraga - vocals on "Marblehead"
- Barb Hunter - cello
- Melanie Howard - vocals on "Marblehead"
- Jae-In Shin - violin
- Brix Smith Start - vocals on "Greenland"
- Andrew Teilo - vocals on "Wales"
