= Sam Spiby =

English footballer

Personal information
- Full name: Samuel Spiby
- Date of birth: 1877
- Place of birth: Ashton-under-Lyne, England
- Date of death: 1953 (aged 75–76)
- Position: Inside left

Senior career*
Years	Team	Apps	(Gls)
1900	Glossop	1	(0)
- * Club domestic league appearances and goals

Samuel Spiby (1877–1953) was an English footballer who made one appearance in the Football League for Glossop as an inside left.

== Personal life ==
Spiby served in the King's (Liverpool Regiment) and the Manchester Regiment during the First World War. He was court-martialed at Altcar Camp, Merseyside in July 1916 and finished the war as a private in the Labour Corps.
