= Darren Belk =

British musician

Darren Belk is an English songwriter, bassist and guitarist best known for his tenures in the bands Beachbuggy and The Wedding Present.

Belk was roadie for the bands Cud and The Wedding Present whilst playing guitar and writing songs for his own band Bungalow in the late 1980s/early 1990s. After Bungalow split Belk formed Beachbuggy and assumed the pseudonym Jack Straker.

Beachbuggy released a number of self-funded singles showcasing Belk/Straker's obsessions with hot rods and classic cars. These attained modest success before Belk was asked to join The Wedding Present in 1994 after the departure of band's bass player.

Belk played bass on the album Watusi before switching to guitar after the departure of Paul Dorrington. Belk's influence then showed on Mini, the band's car-themed mini-album released in 1995 which proved to be his final recording with The Wedding Present.

Belk had continued to work sporadically with Beachbuggy during his tenure with The Wedding Present and he now returned to the band with a renewed vigour. They eventually released a US-only CD Unsafe.. At Any Speed (1998) before signing to UK label Poptones and recording two albums in Chicago, United States with producer Steve Albini. Sport Fury (2001) and Killer-B (2003), along with a string of further singles met with critical acclaim that was not matched by sales and the band's contract with Poptones was allowed to lapse.

Beachbuggy continued to play live sporadically but by now Belk had begun to concentrate on new band Walker, which includes former Beachbuggy and Wedding Present bandmate Paul Dorrington. After a handful of gigs with a lineup that saw the return of original drummer Jim VeVee, Beachbuggy finally ceased to exist in April 2006. Belk has since concentrated on playing bass and singing with Walker.

== Discography: albums ==
- The Wedding Present: Watusi (Island, 1994)
- The Wedding Present: Mini (Cooking Vinyl, 1995)
- Beachbuggy: Unsafe.. At Any Speed (Sympathy for the Record Industry, 1998)
- The Wedding Present: John Peel Sessions 1992-1995 (compilation, Cooking Vinyl 1998)
- The Wedding Present: Singles 1995-1997 (compilation, Cooking Vinyl 1999
- Beachbuggy: Sport Fury (Poptones, 2001)
- Beachbuggy: Killer-B (Poptones, 2003)
- The Wedding Present: The Complete Peel Sessions 1986-2004 (6-CD Box Set, Sanctuary, 2007)
