= The Ukrainians =

British band

- Origin: Leeds, England
- Genres: Folk rock
- Years active: 1991–present
- Spinoff of: The Wedding Present
- Members: Peter Solowka; Len Liggins; Steve Tymruk; Paul Weatherhead; James Howe; Woody
- Website: the-ukrainians.com

The Ukrainians are a British band, which plays traditional Ukrainian music, heavily influenced by western post-punk.

== Career ==
The Ukrainians were formed in 1990 by Wedding Present guitarist Peter Solowka, with singer/violinist Len Liggins and mandolin player Roman Remeynes, after all three had played on the Wedding Present's Ukrainian John Peel Sessions recordings (Ukrainski Vistupi v Johna Peela, released 1989). Following the success of that release, the trio began composing and recording in Ukrainian as a separate band.

In 1991, their first EP, Oi Divchino, was awarded Single of the Week by British music weekly, NME. Notably, the video for this release was filmed in pre-revolution Kyiv making them the first western band to produce a video entirely in Eastern Europe.

In the same year, Solowka left the Wedding Present, later claiming that he had been kicked out, the success of the Ukrainian project making him the scapegoat for the band's lack of mainstream success.

Since 1991, the band has released seven studio albums as well as various live albums and EPs, all without chart success in the UK. They continue to tour regularly, especially in Poland and England. They celebrated 20 years of the band in 2011 with a tour of British Ukrainian clubs.

== Band members ==
Besides Solowka, Liggins and Remeynes, band members have included:

- Dave Lee - drums
- Woody - drums, percussion
- Chris Harrop - bass guitar
- Paul 'Dino' Briggs - bass guitar
- Allan Martin - bass guitar
- Alan Dawson- Bass guitar
- James Howe - bass guitar
- Stepan "Ludwig" Pasicznyk - accordion, backing vocals, guitar
- Steve Tymruk - accordion, melodion, backing vocals
- Paul Weatherhead - electric mandolin, sopilka, theremin
- Michael L.B. West - mandolin, guitar, piano, trumpet, duda, oud, 'cello, euphonium

The current line-up comprises Liggins, Solowka, Tymruk, Wood, Weatherhead and Howe.

== Discography ==
Albums and EPs and singles include:

- Oi Divchino (1991)
- The Ukrainians (1991)
- Pisni iz The Smiths (EP) (1992) (four songs originally by The Smiths translated into Ukrainian, also included as bonus tracks on reissues of Kultura).
- Vorony (1993)
- Live in Germany (1993)
- Kultura (1994)
- Radioactivity (Single) (1996), a cover of the Kraftwerk song, in order to raise money for the Children of Chernobyl charity and to mark the 10th anniversary of the Chernobyl nuclear disaster.
- Drink to my Horse! The Ukrainians Live (2001)
- Anarchy in the UK (EP) (2002) (three songs originally by the Sex Pistols translated into Ukrainian).
- Respublika (2002)
- Istoriya: The Best of the Ukrainians (2004)
- Live in Czeremcha (2008)
- Diaspora (2009)
- 20 Years (Best of) (2011)
- A History of Rock Music in Ukrainian (2015)
- Summer in Lviv (2018)
