= Paul Dorrington =

English guitarist and bassist

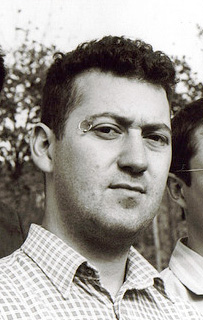

Background information
- Years active: 1985–present

Paul Dorrington is an English guitarist and bassist best known for his 1991-1995 tenure in The Wedding Present.

Dorrington joined Sheffield group AC Temple in 1985, and recorded Rorschach Blot Test, a live compilation album featuring The Dustdevils and Kilgore Trout. In 1988 he formed Tse Tse Fly with Mark Goodrham and future Wedding Present and Cinerama guitarist Simon Cleave.

In 1991, Paul Dorrington joined The Wedding Present on guitar, recording The Hit Parade 1, Hit Parade 2 and Watusi albums before leaving in 1995. Dorrington was also the guitarist of Cha Cha Cohen, recording a single on Hemiola records and an album on Chemikal Underground Records.

In 2016, Paul Dorrington joined The Sleazoids on bass, a garage punk trio (with Missy Tassles and Mitch Genner) based in Sheffield. The Sleazoids released an LP titled 'Insane Escapades' on the Sheffield Phonographic Corporation label in 2017.
