= Hit Parade 1 =

Compilation album by The Wedding Present
- Released: 8 June 1992
- Recorded: January–May 1992
- Length: 41:22
- Label: RCA
- Producer: Chris Nagle, Ian Broudie

The Wedding Present chronology
Seamonsters (1991)	Hit Parade 1 (1992)	Hit Parade 2 (1993)

In 1992, The Wedding Present decided to release a limited edition single every month, each featuring an original track on the A side and a cover on the B side. The tracks were compiled as two LPs called Hit Parade 1 and Hit Parade 2 and re-released as a double CD in 2003 called The Hit Parade.

The plan to release 12 singles in a year was an attempt to match Elvis Presley's record of 12 top 40 singles in a year which he had achieved in 1957. The singles, each in an edition of 10,000, were deleted soon after release. They were critically acclaimed and each charted in the top 40.

Revisiting the album in 2013, the band played all the songs on their UK and European tour.

== Track listing ==
1. "Blue Eyes"
2. "Go Go Dancer"
3. "Three"
4. "Silver Shorts"
5. "Come Play With Me"
6. "California"
7. "Cattle and Cane" (The Go-Betweens)
8. "Don't Cry No Tears" (Neil Young and Crazy Horse)
9. "Think That it Might" (Altered Images)
10. "Falling" (Julee Cruise)
11. "Pleasant Valley Sunday" (The Monkees)
12. "Let's Make Some Plans" (Close Lobsters)
