= Peter Solowka =

- Born: 1959 (age 66–67)
- Origin: Oldham, Lancashire, England
- Genres: Indie rock, Ukrainian folk music
- Occupations: Musician, composer
- Instruments: Vocals, guitar
- Years active: 1985–present

Peter Solowka or Solovka (Ukrainian: Петро Соловка, pronounced [peˈtrɔ soˈlɔu̯kɐ], born late 1959 in Oldham) is a musician of Ukrainian and Yugoslavian descent. He has been involved in music since 1985, most notably as guitarist with The Wedding Present from their inception until 1991, and then with The Ukrainians until the present day.

The Wedding Present was formed when Peter joined with old school friend David Gedge, Keith Gregory and Shaun Charman. The band released many EPs and singles as well as three successful albums:

- George Best (1987)
- Bizarro (1989)
- Seamonsters (1991)

The group performed at major festivals and appeared in national and indie charts, plus TV shows. During this time, Peter developed an interest in his ethnic roots and worked with the band to produce an album of Ukrainian-inspired music, helped by Roman Remeynes and Len Liggins. The album featured for the first time in three John Peel Sessions. It was later released by RCA records.

- Українські Виступи в Івана Піла (1989)

The album reached no 22 in the national album charts – a record for an Eastern European language record in the UK. The interest in the music was such that RCA requested another Ukrainian album. Throughout 1990, the band were working on two albums (Seamonsters and the new Ukrainian album) and this caused tensions between individual band members. Both albums were finished in early 1991, after which it was decided that it would be best if Peter concentrated on the Ukrainian music.

The RCA album recorded by The Wedding Present was released as The Ukrainians' first album:

- The Ukrainians (1991)

After leaving the Wedding Present, Peter formed The Ukrainians with Roman Remeynes, Len Liggins and Stepan Pasicznyk. Known as the originators of Ukrainian folk rock, The Ukrainians have released ten albums since 1991. The group have performed over 1000 gigs in 20 countries, including many of the major international world music festivals.

- The Ukrainians (1991)
- Pisni iz The Smiths (EP) (1992) (four songs originally by The Smiths translated into Ukrainian).
- Vorony (1993)
- Live in Germany (1993)
- Kultura (1994)
- Drink to my Horse! The Ukrainians Live (2001)
- Anarchy In The UK (EP) (2002) (three songs originally by the Sex Pistols translated into Ukrainian).
- Respublika (2002)
- Istoriya: The Best of the Ukrainians (2004)
- Live in Czeremcha (2008)
- Diaspora (2009)
- 20 Years (Best of) (2011)
- A History of Rock Music in Ukrainian (2015)
