= Hit Parade 2 =

Compilation album by The Wedding Present
- Released: 4 January 1993
- Recorded: January–June 1992
- Length: 39:24
- Label: RCA
- Producer: Jimmy Miller, Brian Paulson

The Wedding Present chronology
| Hit Parade 1 (1992) | Hit Parade 2 (1993) | Watusi (1994) |

Hit Parade 2 is a compilation album by The Wedding Present released in January 1993. Having decided to release a limited edition single every month for all of 1992 (each featuring an original track on the A side and a cover version on the B side) the group subsequently compiled the songs as two LPs called Hit Parade 1 and Hit Parade 2. In 2003, a double CD was issued called simply The Hit Parade.

A different recording of "Boing!" than the one found on the original 7" single was used on all subsequent album editions - the single edition was produced by Jimmy Miller (who also produced "Flying Saucer"), the re-recording by Brian Paulson (who also produced the remaining singles). The original video for this track was also omitted from the VHS compilation Dick York's Wardrobe.

== Track listing ==
1. "Flying Saucer"
2. "Boing!"
3. "Love Slave"
4. "Sticky"
5. "The Queen of Outer Space"
6. "No Christmas"
7. "Rocket" (Mud)
8. "Theme from Shaft" (Isaac Hayes)
9. "Chant of the Ever Circling Skeletal Family" (David Bowie)
10. "Go Wild in the Country" (Bow Wow Wow)
11. "U.F.O." (Barry Gray)
12. "Step into Christmas" (Elton John)

Early copies of the LP and CD formats came with an extra disc comprising BBC radio session versions of all 12 A-sides. These tracks have all been subsequently reissued on various CD compilations.

== Charts ==
Hit Parade 2 spent 2 weeks on the UK Official Album Chart, peaking at number 19 in January 1993.
