= Cinerama (band) =

English indie pop band

Cinerama is an English indie pop band, headed by David Gedge, the frontman for The Wedding Present. The band combines rock guitar music with string and woodwind sounds.

== Career ==
Formed in 1998, Cinerama began as a duo comprising David Gedge and Sally Murrell. Initial releases were stylistically different from The Wedding Present, featuring soundtrack-like arrangements with string and woodwind accompaniment. Live performances included the many musicians required to create the orchestral accompaniment present in the recordings. Over time the band's sound returned to rock, with songs originally recorded by The Wedding Present incorporated into Cinerama's live set.

During the recording of the album that became Take Fountain, Gedge decided that the band's sound had changed so much that the album should be released as The Wedding Present.

== Post 2004 ==
Most Wedding Present set lists during this time included at least one Cinerama song.

The band played and recorded occasionally and performed a short set at each of David Gedge's "At the edge of.." festivals. The line-up usually comprised the current Wedding Present lineup but with the musicians switching their usual instruments.

On 18 May 2015, Cinerama released a re-vamped version of the Wedding Present's album Valentina. The re-recording of a Wedding Present long player by Cinerama had been a long-term ambition of David Gedge. In December 2024 Cinerama released a re-recording of their debut album, this time titled Va Va Voom 25, and featuring full-band re-recordings made in 2023–24.

== Discography ==
=== Singles ===
- "Kerry Kerry" (Cooking Vinyl 1998) – UK Singles Chart No. 71
- "Dance, Girl, Dance" (Cooking Vinyl 1998)
- "Pacific/King's Cross" (double A-side 7" vinyl / Elefant 1999)
- "Manhattan" (Scopitones 2000)
- "Wow" (Scopitones 2000)
- "Lollobrigida" (Scopitones 2000)
- "Your Charms" (Scopitones 2000)
- "Superman" (Scopitones 2001)
- "Health and Efficiency" (Scopitones 2001)
- "Quick, Before It Melts" (Scopitones 2002)
- "Careless" (Scopitones 2002)
- "Don't Touch That Dial" (Scopitones 2003)
- "It's Not You, It's Me" (GoMetric! Records 2004)

=== Albums ===
Studio albums

- Va Va Voom (Cooking Vinyl 1998)
- Disco Volante (Scopitones 2000)
- Torino (Scopitones 2002)
- Valentina (2015)
- Va Va Voom 25 (Scopitones / Clue, 2024)

Compilations

- This Is Cinerama (compilation, Cooking Vinyl 2000)
- John Peel Sessions (compilation, Scopitones 2001)
- Cinerama Holiday (compilation, Scopitones 2002)
- John Peel Sessions: Season 2 (compilation, Scopitones 2003)
- John Peel Sessions: Season 3 (compilation, Sanctuary 2007)
- The Complete Peel Sessions (triple album box set compilation, Sanctuary 2007)
- Seven Wonders of the World (compilation, Scopitones 2014)

Live albums

- Live in Los Angeles (Scopitones 2002)
- Live in Belfast (Scopitones 2003)
- Live in New York (Download Album 2010)
- Live 2015 (Scopitones, 2015)

=== DVDs ===
- Get Up and Go (Scopitones 2004)

== Members ==
The band has included the following members:

- David Gedge — lead vocals, guitar (1997–2004, 2009–present)
- Sally Murrell — keyboards, vocals (1997–2003)
- Emma Pollock — vocals (session 1998)
- Marty Willson-Piper — guitar (session 1998)
- Anthony Coote — bass (session 1998)
- Simon Cleave — guitar (1998–2004)
- Philip Robinson — keyboards (1998–2000)
- Terry de Castro — bass, vocals (1998–2004, 2013, 2018), guitar (2009–2010, 2015, 2022–present)
- Richard Marcangelo — drums (1998)
- Bryan McLellan — drums (1998–2000)
- Simon Pearson — drums (2000) (died 2023)
- Kaari Paavola — drums (2000–2004)
- Graeme Ramsay — drums (2009–2011)
- Charles Layton — bass (2009–2011), drums (2012–2019)
- Pepe le Moko — guitar (2011–2012)
- Sevjan Sitki — keyboards (2011–2012)
- Samuel Beer-Pearce — keyboards (2012–2013), guitar (2012–2016)
- Patrick Alexander — bass (2012), guitar (2013)
- Danielle Wadey — keyboards (2013–2016), guitar (2014, 2018–2019), bass (2017)
- Katherine Wallinger — bass (2014–2016)
- Melanie Howard — keyboards (2014–2017), guitar (2018), bass (2019–2023)
- Elizabeth Palmer — flute (2015)
- Andrew Blick — trumpet (2015, 2017, 2019)
- Marcus Kain — guitar (2017)
- Maria Scaroni — keyboards (2017–2019)
- Jaqueline Wickham — keyboards (2018)
- Freya Wallis — guitar (2019), keyboards (2022)
- Emily O'Rourke — flute (2019)
- Aegli Issias — guitar (2022)
- Nicholas Wellauer — drums (2022–2023)
- Rachael Wood — guitar (2023–present)
- Emilie Geissmar-Wagstaff — flute (2023–present)
- Robin Squirrell — cello (2023–present)
- Vincenzo Lammi — drums (2023–present)
- Paul Blackburn — bass (2023–present)
- Charlotte Adolpho — keyboards (2023–present)

== See also ==
- Baroque pop
