= Saturnalia (The Wedding Present album) =

Studio album by The Wedding Present
- Released: 9 September 1996
- Genre: Alternative rock, indie rock
- Length: 41:34
- Label: Cooking Vinyl
- Producer: Cenzo Townshend and Wedding Present

The Wedding Present chronology
Watusi (1994)	Saturnalia (1996)	Take Fountain (2005)

Professional ratings
Review scores
Source	Rating
NME	8/10

Saturnalia is the fifth studio album released by The Wedding Present. It was released in 1996.

The NME's Mark Beaumont said that it was "one of the best pop albums of the year."

== Track listing ==
1. "Venus" - 1.53
2. "Real Thing" - 2.09
3. "Dreamworld" - 4.23
4. "2, 3, Go" - 5.13
5. "Snake Eyes" - 2.03
6. "Hula Doll" - 2.47
7. "Big Boots" - 3.45
8. "Montreal" - 3.06
9. "Skin Diving" - 3.10
10. "Jet Girl" - 2.21
11. "Kansas" - 2.53
12. "50s" - 4.58
13. "Up" - 2.53

== Charts ==
Chart performance for Saturnalia
Chart (1996)	Peak position
UK Albums (OCC)	36
Scottish Albums (OCC)	67
