= Manifesto Records =

American record label

Manifesto Records is an independent record label based in Los Angeles, California that has released records by Dead Kennedys, Tim Buckley, Cinerama, Concrete Blonde, Cranes, The Czars, Screamin' Jay Hawkins, Lilys, The Rugburns, Sing-Sing, Ken Stringfellow, Tom Waits, and The Wedding Present.

Manifesto released the entire catalogue of Dead Kennedys in 2001 after the band obtained the rights from Alternative Tentacles. Manifesto is also the home of an imprint of Mark Volman and Howard Kaylan of The Turtles, called FloEdCo; this imprint has released albums by The Turtles and Flo & Eddie. In November 2015, Manifesto re-released the entire catalogue of Lee Michaels that had been on A&M Records.

Manifesto is headed by Evan Cohen, a music-business and copyright lawyer and nephew of Herb Cohen, the late former manager of Frank Zappa, Tim Buckley, Linda Ronstadt, and Tom Waits.

In August 2015, the label announced that it was signing several new artists, including Puro Instinct, Drinking Flowers, Cellars, and Band Aparte.

In 2017, Manifesto released a complete box set of recordings by Allan Holdsworth, and has also unearthed further recordings by Tim Buckley and Screamin' Jay Hawkins.

In November 2018, Manifesto released a nine-CD box set of the complete recordings of Kalapana from 1975 to 1983.

== See also ==
- List of record labels
