= The Wedding Present =

British indie band

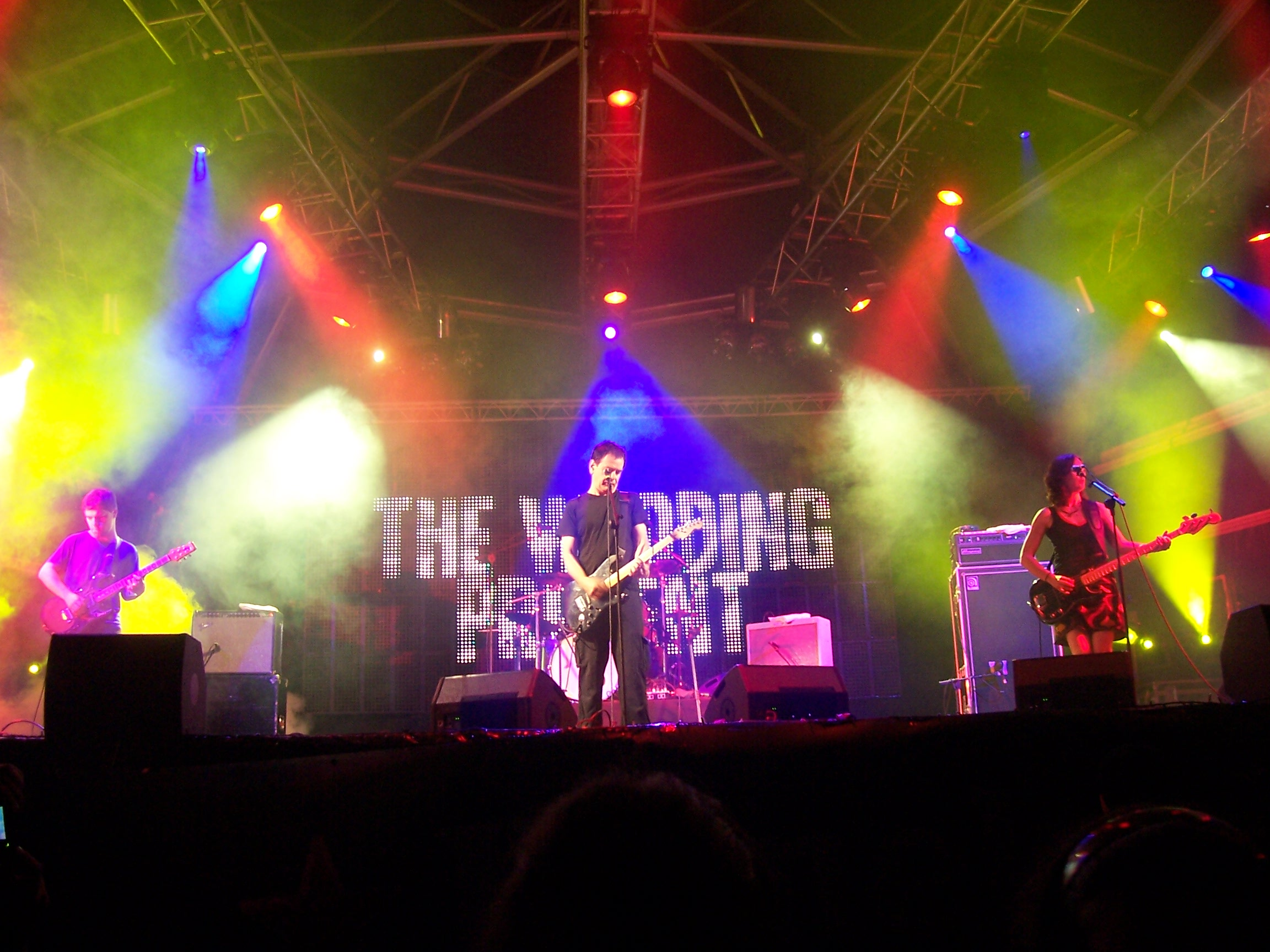
- The Wedding Present performing at Cultura Quente in Caldas de Reis, Spain, July 2009.

Background information
- Origin: Leeds, West Yorkshire, England
- Genres: Indie rock; indie pop; alternative rock; post-punk; jangle pop; noise pop; pop-punk
- Years active: 1985–1997; 2004–present
- Labels: Reception; RCA; Island; Talitres; Cooking Vinyl; Scopitones; Manifesto
- Members: David Gedge; Christopher Hardwick; Rachael Wood; Stuart Hastings
- Past members: Past members
- Website: Official site

The Wedding Present are an English indie rock group formed in 1985 in Leeds, England, by members of the Lost Pandas. The band has been led by vocalist and guitarist David Gedge, the band's only constant member.

Closely linked to the C86 scene, the band has charted a total of eighteen singles in the top 40 of the UK Singles Chart, including a historic run of twelve singles – one for each month – in 1992, which tied Elvis Presley's record for most top 40 hits in a single year.

== History ==
=== Early stages and the Reception era (1985–1989) ===
The band has its origins in the Lost Pandas, which folded in 1984 when Janet Rigby, the drummer for the band, left following departure of guitarist Michael Duane. David Gedge and the Lost Pandas' bass player, Keith Gregory, continued the band, renaming it the Wedding Present. The name was jointly conceived by Gedge and his girlfriend at the time, as they were both avid fans of the Birthday Party and it was an homage to their favourite band.

I've always thought that the Wedding Present was an inappropriate name for a pop band — more like a poem, or a book or something — and therefore quite attractive (to me!). I've also always been fascinated by weddings...

Gedge and Gregory recruited an old schoolmate of Gedge's, Peter Solowka, to play guitar and auditioned a string of drummers, including John Ramsden, and Mike Bedford, with whom they recorded a demo tape, before settling on Shaun Charman. The band played at clubs and bars as they prepared for the recording of their first, self-financed single. "Go Out and Get 'Em, Boy!" was chosen over early favourite "Will You Be Up There?" Charman felt somewhat insecure about his drumming abilities and so the A-side features drumming by hired hand Julian Sowa (Charman does, however, play drums on its B-side). The single was released on the band's own Reception Records label with distribution through Red Rhino.

Two more singles followed that did well on the independent charts helped by veteran BBC Radio 1 DJ John Peel who was one of their first champions. He invited them to do a radio session (three songs from the session are included on the 1988 compilation Tommy 1985–1987; the entire session had already been released as an EP in 1986), starting a long collaboration. By the time the band started work on their debut album, a number of independent and major record companies showed interest, but the band declined all offers and decided to keep releasing their material themselves. The album was released in 1987 and titled George Best after the well-known Northern Irish football player. It was produced by the band and Chris Allison.

Upon its release, the album was critically acclaimed and the band were soon classified, with some of their peers, as members of the 'shambling' or C86 scene, a categorisation that they vehemently declined (although they were featured on the original C86 compilation). Musically, the album featured fast-paced rhythm guitar; lyrically, apart from a few excursions into social critique ("All This and More") and politics ("All About Eve"), Gedge's main concerns (which would become his trademark) were love, lust, heartbreak and revenge. Soon after the release of George Best, the early singles and radio sessions were compiled and released as Tommy (1985–1987). When Solowka, who has Ukrainian roots, started fooling around with a Ukrainian folk tune during one of their Peel sessions, the idea arose to devote some of their radio time to recording their versions of Ukrainian folk songs, encouraged by Peel. To this end, two guest musicians were invited, singer/violin player Len Liggins and mandolin player Roman Remeynes, and three Peel sessions were recorded with Gedge temporarily limiting himself to playing rhythm guitar and arranging the songs.

Between the recording of the first and the second 'Ukrainian' session, Charman was fired from the band. His replacement was Simon Smith, who remained the band's drummer until 1997 and for a long time was, next to Gedge, the only other stable factor in the shifting line-ups. The band planned on releasing eight cuts from the Ukrainian sessions on a 10" LP and an initial batch was pressed when Red Rhino went into receivership. Rather than trying to find a new distribution company, the band decided to fold their Reception label altogether and sign with a regular record company: RCA.

=== The RCA era (1989–1993) ===
Although the band were criticized by some quarters for 'selling out', under the terms of their contract they were allowed their own choice of producer and singles. They also had the option of releasing any singles rejected by the label independently without breach of contract. The band's new record company bought the initial Reception stock of the Ukrainian record from the band, pressed another batch, and released the record in April 1989 under the name of Українські Виступи в Івана Піла (meaning 'Ukrainian John Peel Sessions'; the Latin transliteration Ukraïnski Vistupi v Ivana Peela appeared on the sleeve's spine only).

The first proper album that the Wedding Present recorded for their new label was released in the same year 1989 and reunited them with producer Chris Allison. Bizarro's lyrical themes were largely the same as before and the songs featured the same three-chord structures, but its production values had increased due to a larger recording budget. The album was recorded at Jacobs Studios by Steve Lyon and mixed by him and Chris Allison. The album's companion single, "Kennedy", provided the band with their first British Top 40 hit.

In 1989, the band covered the song "Box Elder" by a then-unknown American indie rock band named Pavement. Gregory had found Pavement's limited-pressing debut single during a trip to the United States and the Wedding Present's cover inspired John Peel to promote Pavement on his radio show, a key step in Pavement's breakthrough.

Seeing that they were growing more popular in the American college radio scene, the band turned towards America for their next project. The band decided to re-record Bizarro track "Brassneck" with the former Big Black frontman Steve Albini. It was the start of a two-year collaboration: the next single, "Corduroy", and album, Seamonsters, were also recorded by Albini at Pachyderm Recording Studio in Cannon Falls, Minnesota.

Melody Maker likened listening to the record to sandpapering your ears. End-of-year readers polls, however, showed the opening track and lead single of the album, "Dalliance", amongst the top of the favourites list. Almost directly after recording the album, the band announced that they had sacked Solowka. His replacement was Paul Dorrington of local band Tse Tse Fly (also formerly of A.C. Temple). Solowka teamed up again with Liggins and Remeynes to form The Ukrainians, and continued to blend post-punk with traditional Ukrainian music.

==== The Hit Parade (1992) ====
The next year saw the band release twelve 7" singles in one year. Each single had a limited pressing of 10,000 copies which all reached the Top 30 in the UK Singles Chart, equalling Elvis Presley's record for the most UK Top 30 hits in one year. To economise on songwriting, the B-sides consisted of cover versions of songs including Julee Cruise's "Falling" (the theme tune from Twin Peaks). The singles and their B-sides, produced by various producers such as Ian Broudie (Lightning Seeds) and Jimmy Miller (The Rolling Stones) were collected on two albums, Hit Parade 1 and Hit Parade 2.

The demand in the United Kingdom for the Wedding Present's singles was so high that distributors began poaching from a separate 5,000-copy stash meant for sale in all other markets to sell in the UK. The Wedding Present had the distinction of having all 12 hit singles be solely original material, whereas Elvis reached his record through archival re-issues. The Hit Parade effectively served as the band's third album under the RCA contract, and the band played Top of the Pops four times in the same year.

Seamonsters, Hit Parade 1 and Hit Parade 2 were released in the United States in 1991 and 1992 by New York-based pseudo-indie label First Warning Records. Shortly after the 1992 singles scheme had ended, the band announced they were leaving RCA.

=== The Island era (1994–1995) ===
The band spent most of 1993 taking time off, occasionally playing gigs. A stopgap compilation of three more archive radio sessions, Peel Sessions 1987–1990, was released by Strange Fruit. When they re-emerged in early 1994 with the news that they had signed to Island Records, it was quickly followed by the announcement that Gregory had left the band, due to lack of enthusiasm, and was replaced by Darren Belk. For their next album, the Wedding Present again left for the United States and enlisted Steve Fisk (Screaming Trees, Nirvana). The result was Watusi. The album's songs ranged from warm lo-fi pop ("Gazebo", "Big Rat") to semi-psychedelic, Velvets-like workouts ("Click Click", "Catwoman").

No further albums were recorded for Island, and the best part of 1995 was spent the same way as 1993: touring, writing new material, no recording. Paul Dorrington quit the band; no replacement was made as Belk doubled on bass and guitar. In the autumn of 1995, the Wedding Present released "Sucker", a self-financed single that was sold at their gigs only (it has since been included on compilation albums). Shortly after, the band signed with independent label Cooking Vinyl.

=== The Cooking Vinyl era (1995–1997/99) ===
The band, still a three-piece, recorded their newly written material and issued the car-themed six-track mini-album, Mini. Belk played both guitar and bass on the songs. Shortly after releasing the album, Jayne Lockey, who had already sung backing vocals on Mini, was announced as the band's new bass player. Belk quit the band and was replaced by Simon Cleave. Both Lockey and Cleave were former members of Tse Tse Fly, along with Paul Dorrington and Mark Goodham.

The band still had material from their sabbatical year and went into the studio again to record Saturnalia. This proved to be the last new material by the Wedding Present for a long time. After playing a number of gigs to support the album, the last one in Liverpool on 18 January 1997, the band took a long sabbatical.

=== Contractual obligations and Cinerama (1997–2004) ===
To fulfill contractual obligations, two more compilations were released by Cooking Vinyl: another Peel sessions volume, John Peel Sessions 1992–1995 (1998), and Singles 1995–1997 (1999). Additionally, Strange Fruit offered another radio sessions compilation, Evening Sessions 1986–1994 (1997), and the band's American label released Singles 1989–1991 (1999), a 2CD package which added rarities and live tracks. Gedge recorded an album, Va Va Voom, in 1998 under the Cinerama band name with his girlfriend, Sally Murrell, and some session musicians. The project became a full-time band.

Following Gedge's split from Murrell in 2003, and with the increasing inclusion of Wedding Present songs in Cinerama's live sets (in previous years Gedge had good-naturedly refused calls from the audience to play Wedding Present songs, frequently replying "that's another band" or "you're at the wrong gig"), Gedge effectively renamed Cinerama in 2004, keeping the line-up, reflecting the change in sound over the years to the more familiar territory of the Wedding Present.

=== Reformation (2004–2019) ===
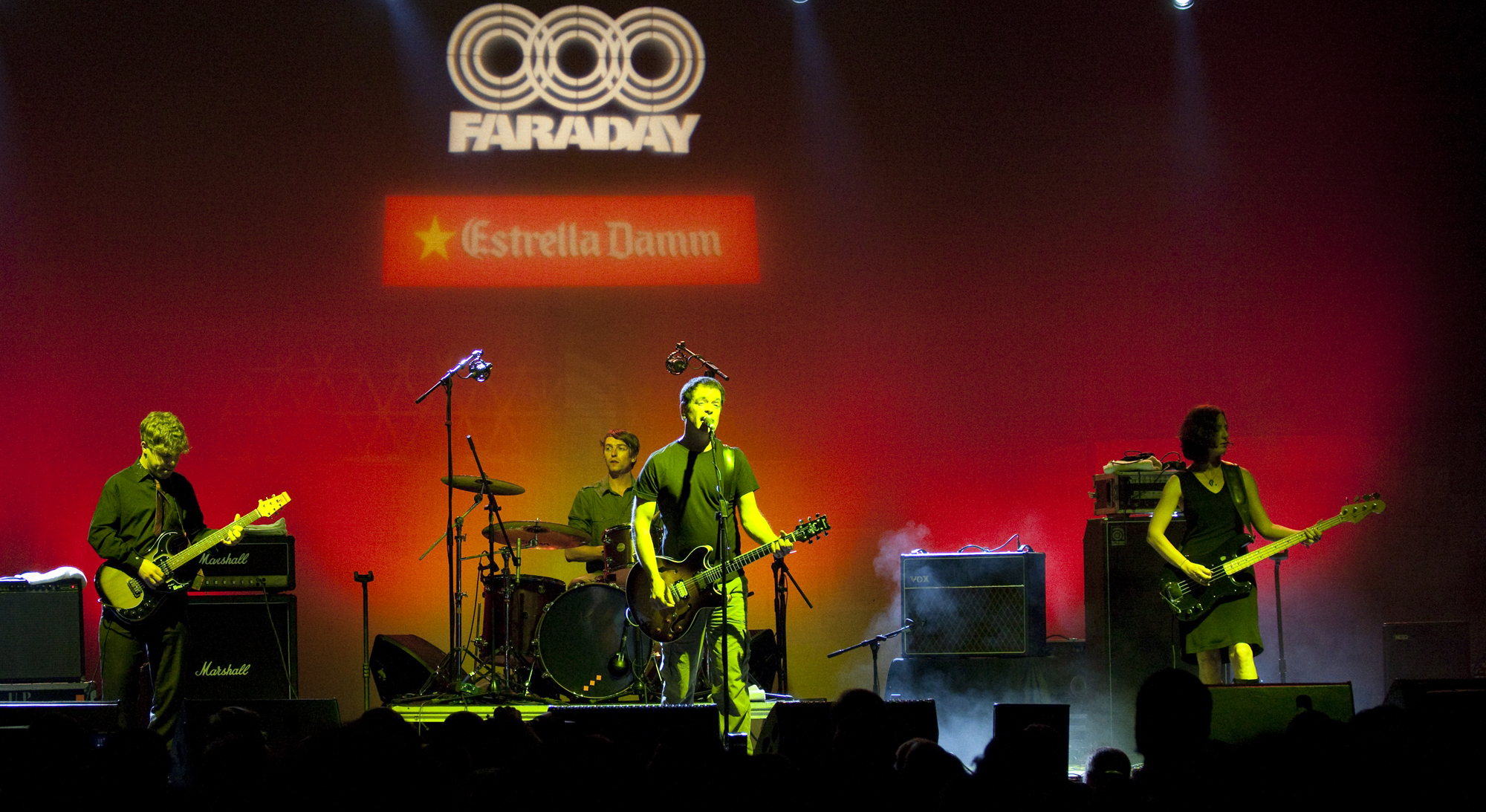
The Wedding Present in Barcelona in 2010.

News came in early September 2004 that Cinerama would be rebranded as the Wedding Present. The line-up was to be the same as the last line-up of Cinerama, which included Simon Cleave. The first new single, "Interstate 5", was issued on 15 November 2004, to lead off the new album, Take Fountain, which was released on 14 February 2005. A second single, "I'm From Further North Than You", was released on 11 April 2005. Third and final single "Ringway to SeaTac" was released on 24 October 2005.

All singles, their B-sides and acoustic versions from this period were compiled on the 2006 compilation Search for Paradise: Singles 2004-5. The release came with a bonus DVD compiling the videos for "Don't Touch That Dial" (a Cinerama single re-recorded for Take Fountain), "Interstate 5", "I'm From Further North Than You", "Ringway to SeaTac" and others.

The Wedding Present toured Europe and North America in the Spring of 2005 (with John Maiden on drums) and again in Europe towards the end of 2005 (this time, with Simon Pearson on drums). During Christmas 2006, guitarist Simon Cleave left the group and was replaced by the group's sound engineer Chris McConville – who played on the 2006 tours of North America (with Charlie Layton on drums) and Europe (with Graeme Ramsay on drums).

Until 2009 the line-up remained stable with Gedge, De Castro, McConville, and Ramsay co-writing. They recorded 17 songs with Steve Albini in January 2008, some of which have been played live at gigs in recent years. Titles include "I've Lost the Monkey", "Soup", "Drink You Eat You", "Model, Actress, Whatever...", "The Thing I Like Most About Him Is His Girlfriend", "Twenty Jackies", "Swingers", "Peek-a-boo", "Hulk Loves Betty", "Boo Boo", "Palisades", "Santa Ana Winds", "Pinch Pull Twist Release", "The Trouble With Men", "Don't Take Me Home Until I'm Drunk" and "Spider-Man in Hollywood".

The album El Rey was released on 20 May 2008 in North America and 26 May 2008 in Europe, accompanied by the digital download-only single "The Thing I Like Best About Him Is His Girlfriend". A compilation of singles and remixes, How The West Was Won, was released towards the end of 2008 and accompanied by a single, "Holly Jolly Hollywood". The Wedding Present also covered The Cure's "High" for American Laundromat Records tribute Just Like Heaven - a tribute to The Cure.

Some months before a short tour of the UK and Japan in March 2009, Chris McConville left the band and was replaced by former guitarist Simon Cleave, who left the band again later that year. Graeme Ramsay subsequently moved from drums to guitar and Charles Layton once again became their drummer.

In 2009 two Wedding Present songs, "I'm from Further North Than You" and "Ringway to SeaTac", appeared in the award-winning Monty Miranda–directed independent film Skills Like This. The director was praised for his use of music in an integrated soundtrack.

In August 2010 it was announced that De Castro would not be touring with the Wedding Present for the Autumn 21st anniversary tour of Bizarro, and that her last gig would be at 28 August 2010 at Gedge's mini festival "At the Edge of the Sea" in Brighton. This marked the end of a 12-year association with Gedge, stretching back to when Cinerama was formed. She was replaced by Pepe le Moko.

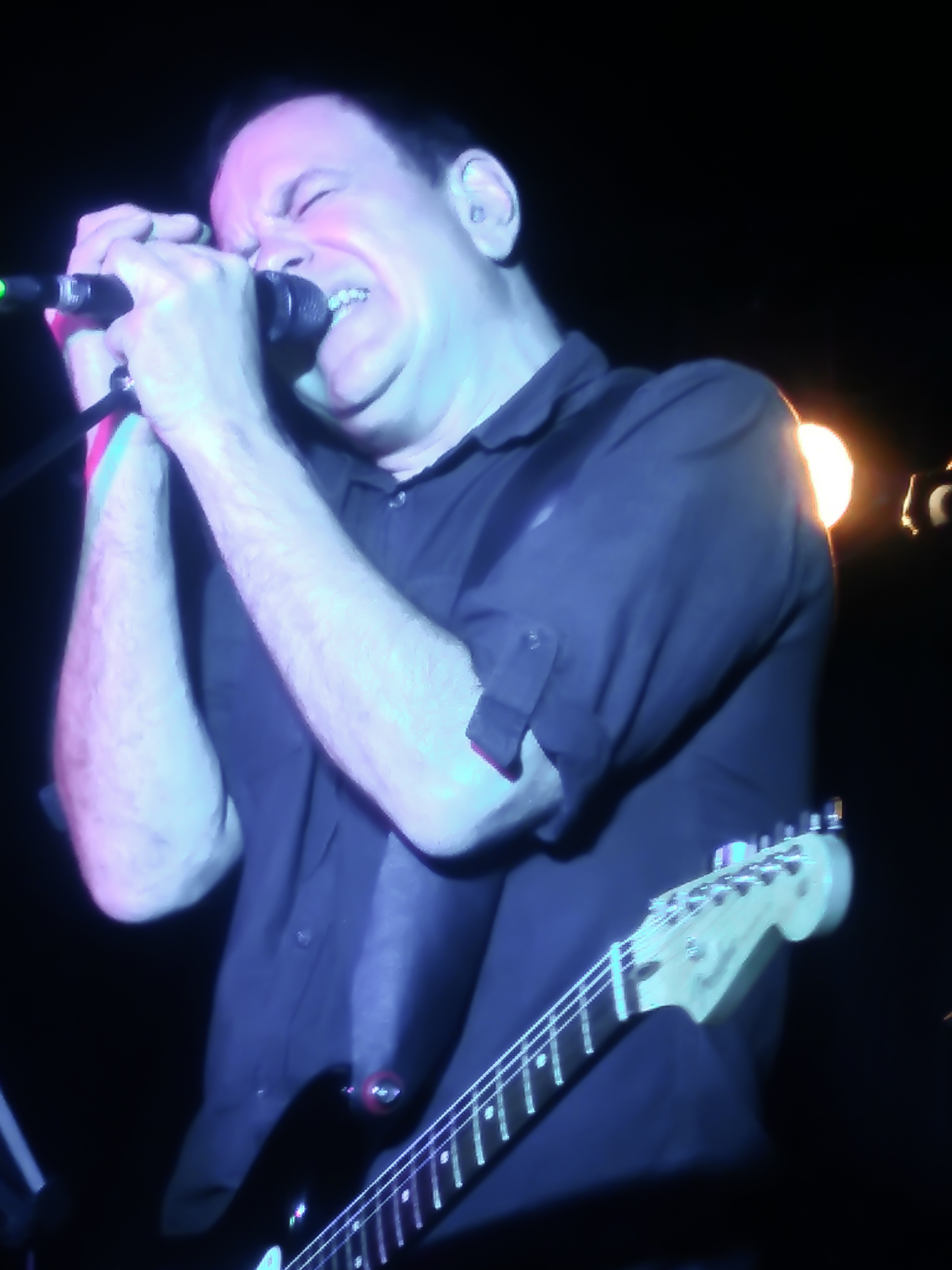
David Gedge, singer of the Wedding Present in Valencia, Spain. October 2016

A new Wedding Present album, Valentina, was released in March 2012. Shortly before its release, guitarist Graeme Ramsay left the band after six years. and was replaced by Patrick Alexander (ex-The Young Playthings and The Pipettes).

During 2012, the Wedding Present toured a set which usually featured the whole of Seamonsters, performed live and in album order. The rest of the set was a mixture of songs from Valentina and the back catalogue. In April of the year, the Wedding Present toured Australia for the first time, playing concerts in Adelaide, Sydney and Melbourne.

On 25 October 2012, the 4 Songs Extended Play was released on download only. These four new songs ("Journey Into Space", "Pain Perdu", "1000 Fahrenheit" and "Can You Keep a Secret") recorded during the Valentina sessions could be downloaded following the purchase of Valentina: The Story of a Wedding Present, a book documenting the making of the long player itself. Valentina itself was re-released in May 2015 after being re-interpreted and re-recorded by David Gedge's other band Cinerama.

In early 2013 the band started a world tour including taking in the US, Australia and for the first time New Zealand. The Wedding Present played George Best and The Hit Parade in their entirety on this tour celebrating the 25th and 21st 'birthday' of these albums respectively.

The band released their ninth album, Going, Going..., on 2 September 2016.

2017 saw the 30th anniversary of the release of George Best, an anniversary tour and a feature-length documentary about the record titled The Wedding Present: Something Left Behind.

In mid-2019, the band issued a completely re-recorded version of 1988 compilation Tommy, plus their first picture disc: a 10" single featuring two new songs.

In late 2019, the band toured playing Bizarro in its entirety. During this tour the band were joined on guitar by Jon Stewart of Sleeper and Chris Hardwick from My Life Story on drums.

=== Acoustic versions and 24 Songs (2020–present) ===
In 2020 during the COVID-19 pandemic, the band recorded various acoustic versions of the bands' tracks, with each musician recording their part of the song from home. The songs were released on the band's social media accounts. Twelve tracks including a duet of a previously unrecorded Sleeper song called "We Should Be Together", recorded as a duet with Louise Wener, were released in February 2021 as Locked Down and Stripped Back.

In December 2020 the band, and various ex-members and collaborators released an album of James Bond–theme cover versions called Not From Where I'm Standing, for the mental health charity Campaign Against Living Miserably.

In April 2021, the band re-released a 30th anniversary version of Seamonsters including the B-sides to the singles released to promote the original 1991 album and tracks from a John Peel Session.

In October 2021, the band announced that in 2022 they would release a 7" single per month, featuring two new songs, for the duration of 2022, repeating their one-single-per-month approach of 1992. This 24 Songs project saw songs written by David Gedge and Sleeper guitarist Jon Stewart, collaborating to write tracks for the first time in the band's history.

In May 2022 the band announced they would release Locked Down and Stripped Back Volume Two, the second album of acoustic home recordings of Wedding Present and Cinerama classics, recorded by band and former band members.

A musical based on the band's songs, Reception: A New Musical, premiered in Leeds in 2025. That same year, they released the EP Maxi, with Rachael Wood on guitar.

== Musical style ==
The band's sound is described as a "warp-speed take on jangly, bittersweet indie pop." According to Jason Ankeny AllMusic, "Though the cast revolves around him, Gedge's devotion to quickly strummed guitars, lively tempos, and sharp hooks has stayed the same since their first single in 1985. The band 's early singles are described as "awkward and energetic." Throughout their career, they have also explored sounds that have been variously described as "noisy," "happily grungy," and "light and fizzy." The tone of David Gedge's vocals are described as "insistent," and his lyrics are described as "earnestly lovelorn."

== Personnel ==
=== Current ===
- David Gedge: vocals, guitar (1985–1997, 2004–present)
- Chris Hardwick: drums (2019–2021, 2025–present)
- Rachael Wood: guitar (2023–present)
- Stuart Hastings: bass (2025–present)

Frequent live stand-in:

- David Coyle: guitar (2023–present)

Per the Wedding Present line-up history from their official website.

=== Past ===
- Keith Gregory: bass (1985–1993)
- Peter Solowka: guitar (1985–1991)
- Shaun Charman: drums, vocals (1985–1988)
- Simon Smith: drums (1988–1997)
- Paul Dorrington: guitar (1991–1995)
- Darren Belk: bass, vocals (1993–1995), guitar (1995–1996)
- Jayne Lockey: bass, vocals (1995–1997)
- Simon Cleave: guitar (1996–1997, 2004–2006, 2009)
- Kari Paavola: drums (2004–2005)
- Simon Pearson: drums (2005)
- Graeme Ramsay: drums (2006–2009), guitar (2009–2012)
- Christopher McConville: guitar (2006–2009)
- Pepé le Moko: bass, vocals (2010–2012)
- Patrick Alexander: guitar (2012–2013)
- Jennifer Schwartz: bass (2013)
- Geoffrey Maddock: guitar (2013)
- Katharine Wallinger: bass (2013–2016)
- Samuel Beer-Pearce: guitar (2013–2016)
- Marcus Kain: guitar (2016–2017)
- Terry de Castro: bass, vocals (2004–2010, 2018)
- Danielle Wadey: bass (2016–2017), guitar (2018–2019)
- Charles Layton: drums (2005, 2009–2019)
- Melanie Howard: bass, vocals (2018–2023)
- Nicholas Wellauer: drums (2021–2023)
- Jon Stewart: guitar (2019–2023)
- Paul Blackburn: bass (2023–2025)
- Vincenzo Lammi: drums (2023–2025)

== Discography ==
- George Best (1987)
- Bizarro (1989)
- Seamonsters (1991)
- Watusi (1994)
- Saturnalia (1996)
- Take Fountain (2005)
- El Rey (2008)
- Valentina (2012)
- Going, Going... (2016)
- Locked Down and Stripped Back (2022)
- Maxi EP (2025)
