= David Gedge =

English musician

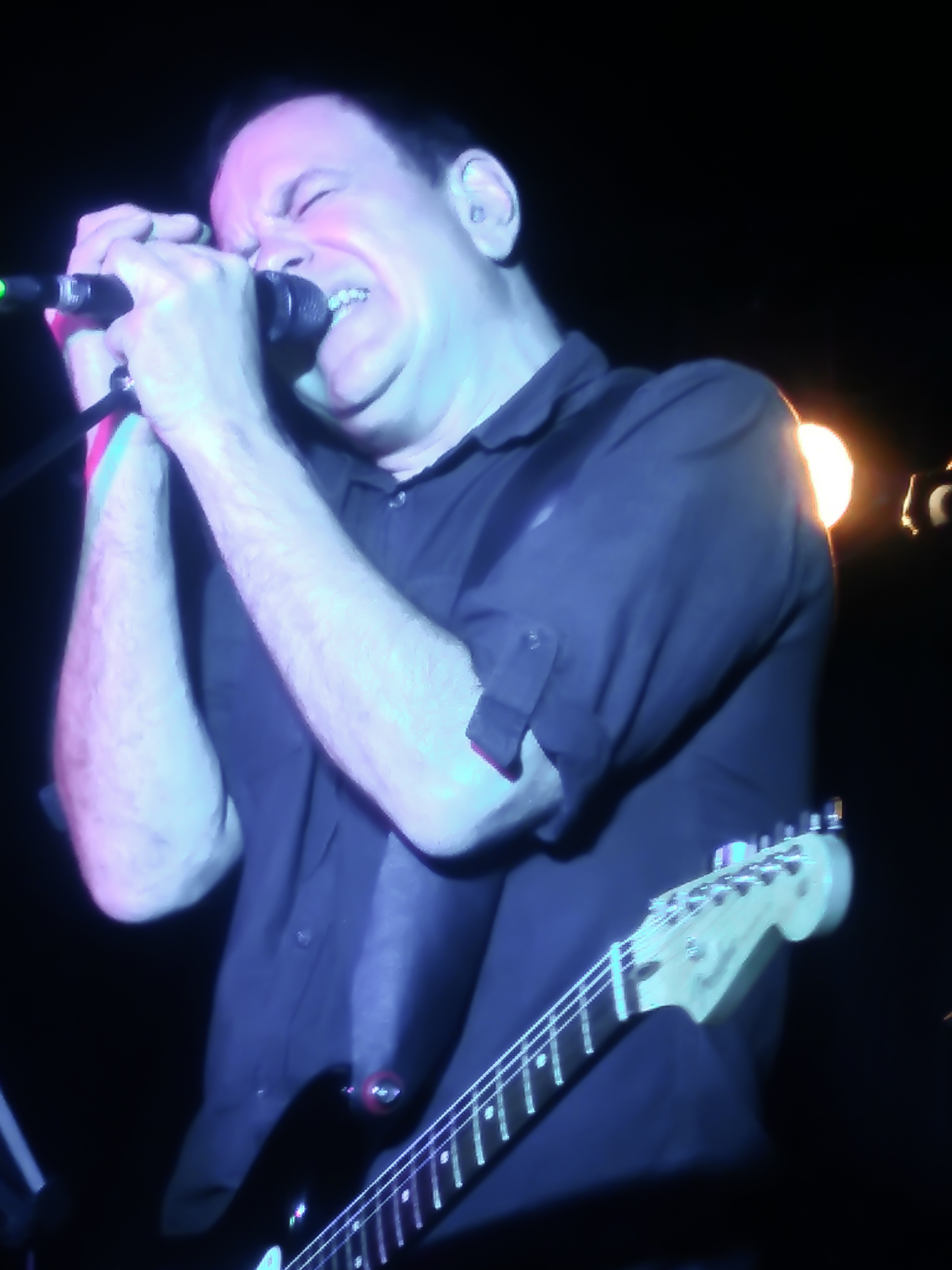
- David Gedge performing at Loco Club in Valencia, November 2016.

Background information
- Born: David Lewis Gedge; 23 April 1960 (age 66); Bramley, Leeds, West Yorkshire, England
- Occupations: Musician; songwriter
- Years active: 1985–present
- Member of: The Wedding Present; Cinerama

David Lewis Gedge (born 23 April 1960) is an English musician and songwriter, most notable as a founder, vocalist, and only remaining original member of The Wedding Present and the main songwriter and vocalist in Cinerama.

== Biography ==
=== Early life ===
Gedge was born in Bramley, Leeds, West Yorkshire, but grew up in Middleton, Greater Manchester after his family moved there when he was a toddler. He attended Hollin High School, which became the Queen Elizabeth School and was eventually rebuilt as St Anne's Academy. He studied at the University of Leeds, graduating with a Bachelor of Science degree in Mathematics in 1981. He was the first of his extended working-class family to go into higher education.

=== Career ===
Gedge formed the Wedding Present with classmates in 1985. He met Keith Gregory, an English student, by placing an advert for a bass player in the Leeds University Union. Gedge sang a duet with Marine Research on their Peel Session in 1999.

== Artistry ==
Gedge's lyrics explore themes such as romance and heartbreak. According to Michael Sutton of AllMusic, his lyrics are "often written from a seemingly autobiographical perspective and sung in a dejected, conversational manner."

== Personal life ==
Gedge married Jessica McMillan, a photographer, in 2014, but they separated in 2023. He lives in Brighton and Hove.
