= Cossack songs =

Music genre

Cossack songs are folk songs which were created by Cossacks.

== Cossack songs of Ukraine ==
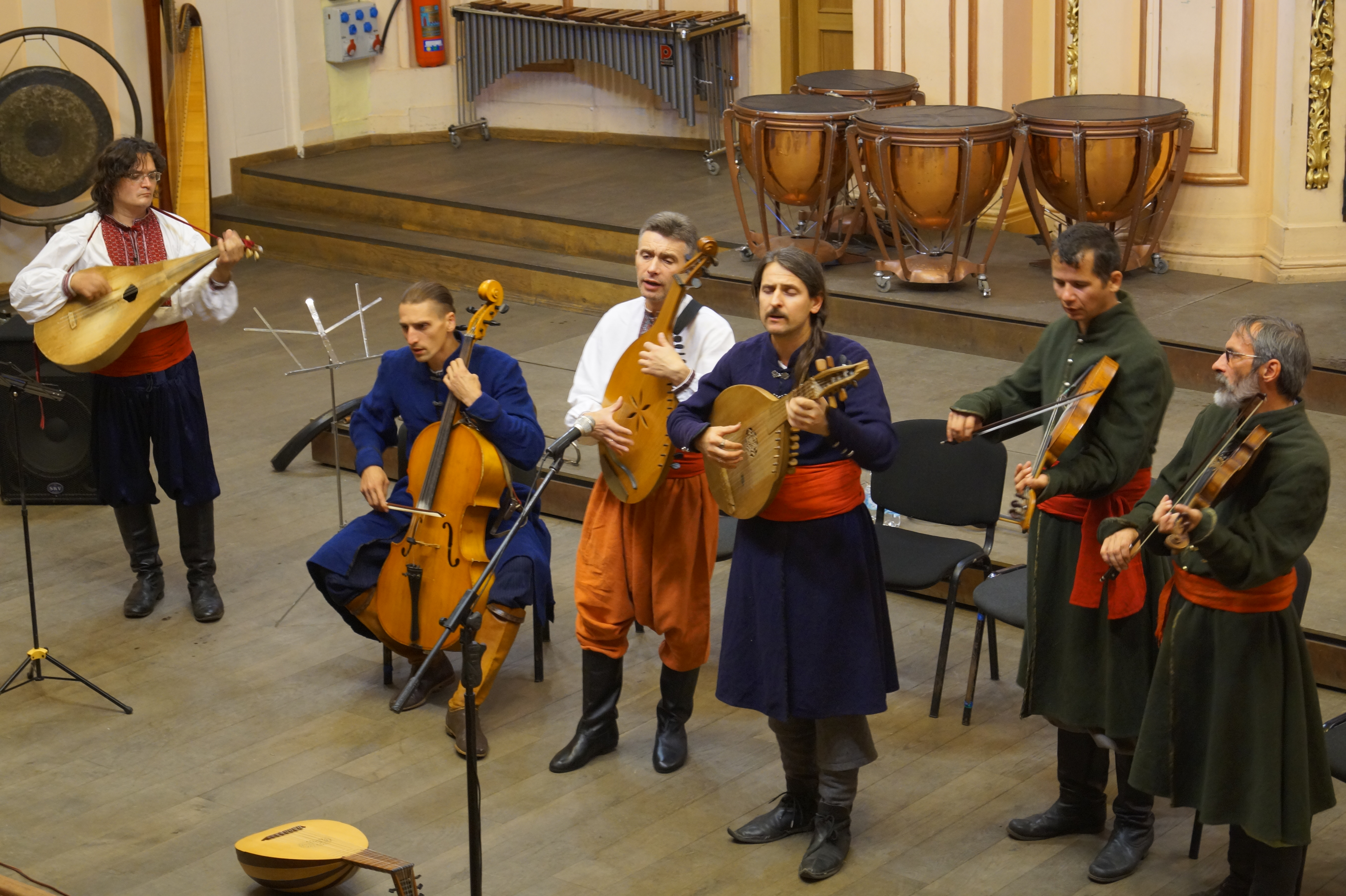
Chorea Kozatska, a modern Ukrainian folk band whose repertoire includes Cossack songs

Cossack songs emerged in the 16–17th centuries among Zaporozhian and Registered Cossacks. Many of them have historical importance, mentioning the names and deeds of famous Ukrainian Cossack leaders such as Dmytro Vyshnevetsky (Baida), Bohdan Khmelnytsky, Petro Doroshenko, Ivan Sirko, Ivan Mazepa, Pavlo Polubotok, Danylo Nechai, Semen Paliy and others. Some Cossack songs have been adopted as patriotic anthems, for example Oi u luzi chervona kalyna.

Characteristic topics of Ukrainian Cossack songs include heroism in battle, military routine and dangers met by Cossacks during their campaigns, sorrows of separation with relatives and loved ones, uncertainty of fate, imprisonment and escape, homesickness and death in foreign land. A special place in those songs is taken by horse—the main companion of a Cossack in battle and during marches.

In terms of musical typology, Ukrainian Cossack songs can be divided into following types: marches, sometimes containing elements of heterophony and kant singing; lyrical songs similar to chants; polyphonic songs of Dnieper Ukraine; lyrical solo compositions. With the flow of time, many Ukrainian Cossack songs were adopted as chumak, haidamak, recruit and soldiers' songs.

=== Research ===
During the early 20th century Ukrainian Cossack songs were studied by musicologist Dmytro Revutsky, who in 1927 published two collections with treatments of folk compositions by Mykola Lysenko, Alexander Serov, Yakiv Stepovy and Levko Revutsky. However, after the abolition of Ukrainization policies in the Soviet Union, in 1932 studies in this direction were limited.

The first transcribed complex of Cossack songs was published in 1997 by bandura player Victor Kyrylenko. In the early 2000s, expeditions into the Dnipropetrovsk region to transcribe more of these folk songs were conducted by Dnipropetrovsk National University staff.

== Popular Cossack songs ==
«Mykluho Maklay» — Song about Cossack Nechay («Ой з-за гори, да ще й з-за лиману»)

- Black soil is turned upside down (Ukrainian: Чорна рілля ізорана) – included in the soundtrack of the film The Lost Letter by Borys Ivchenko
- Lovely, brothers, lovely (Russian: Любо, братцы, любо, Ukrainian: Любо, братці, любо)
- Oh, on the mountain a fire is burning (Ukrainian: Ой, на горі вогонь горить) – Ukrainian folk ballad
- Oh, on the mountain the reapers are reaping (Ukrainian: Ой, на горі та й женці жнуть)
- Song about Baida (Ukrainian: Пісня про Байду)
- Song about Cossack Nechai (Ukrainian: Пісня про козака Нечая), also known as Oh, from behind the hill and from behind the lyman (Ukrainian: Ой, з-за гори та ще й з-за лиману)
- The Steep Banks Overflowed (Ukrainian: Розлилися круті бережечки), formed the basis of Oi u luzi chervona kalyna.
- The Cossacks were ready to march at dawn (Ukrainian: За світ встали козаченьки), alternatively The Cossacks whistled to march at midnight (Засвистали козаченьки) – attributed to Marusia Churai
- The Cossacks were riding (Ukrainian: Їхали козаки) also known as Song about Halia (Пісня про Галю) – a popular Ukrainian wedding song
- The Cossack rode beyond the Danube (Ukrainian: Їхав козак за Дунай, romanized: Yikhav Kozak za Dunai) – text by Semen Klymovsky, adopted in Germany as Schöne Minka

=== Music sheets of some Ukrainian Cossack songs ===
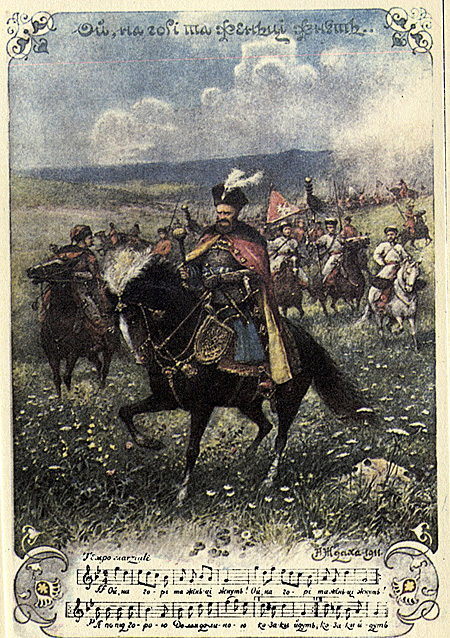
"Oi na hori ta i zhentsi zhnut". English: "Oh, on the mountain the reapers are reaping". Amvrosiy Zhdakha, 1911–1914

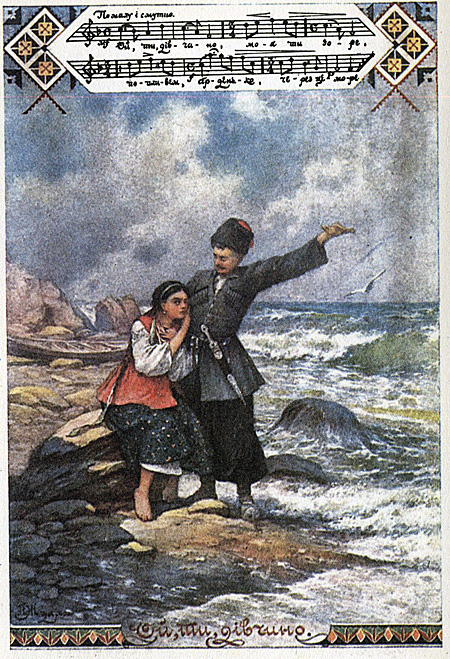
"Oi, ty, divchyno, moia ty zore".
English: "Oh, you girl, my star". Amvrosiy Zhdakha, 1911–1914

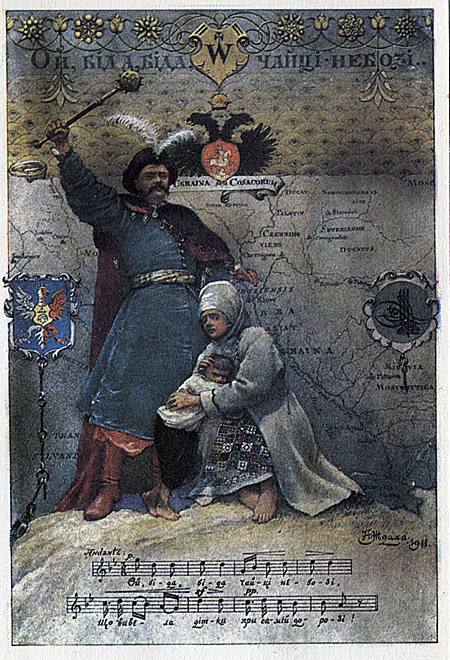
"Oi, bida, bida, chaitsi-nebozi".
English: "Oh, trouble, trouble of the poor seagull". Amvrosiy Zhdakha 1911–1914

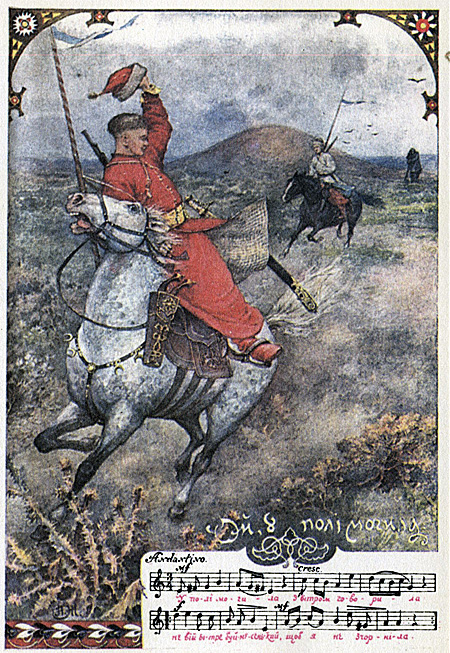
"Oi, u poli mohyla".
English: "Oh, there is a grave in the field". Amvrosiy Zhdakha 1911–1914

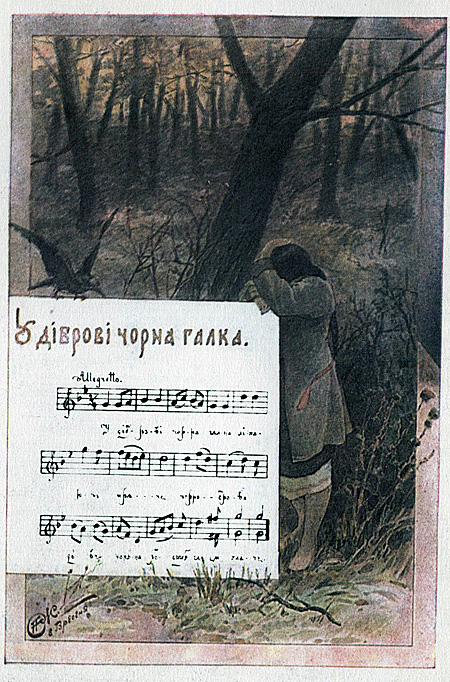
"U dibrovi chorna halka".
English: "In the oak forest there is a black jackdaw". Amvrosiy Zhdakha 1911–1914

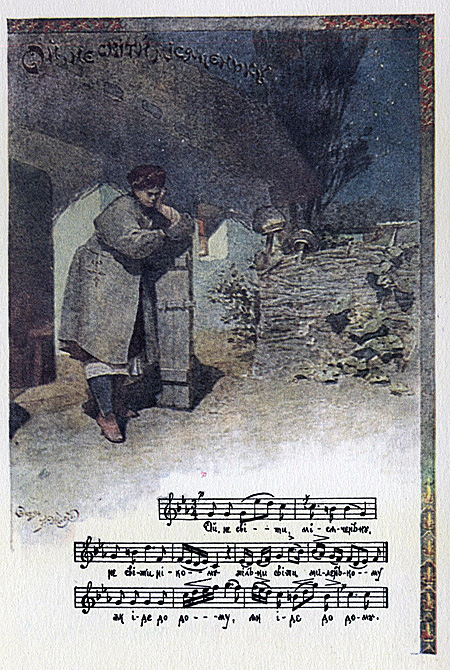
"Oi, ne svity, misiachenku".
English: "Oh, don't shine, Moon". Amvrosiy Zhdakha 1911–1914

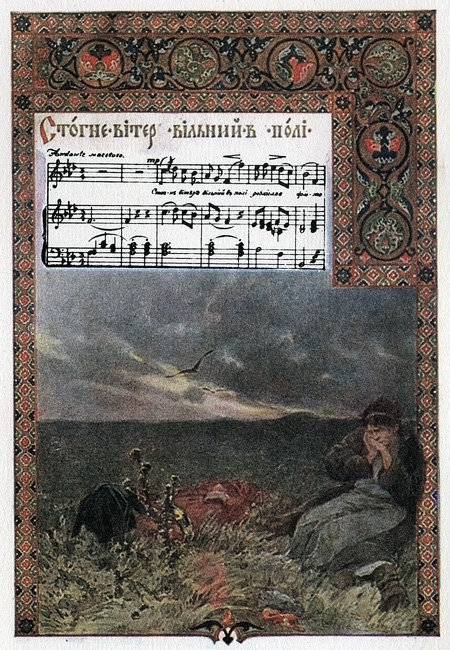
"Stohne viter vilnyi v poli".
English: "Free wind wails in the field". Amvrosiy Zhdakha 1911–1914

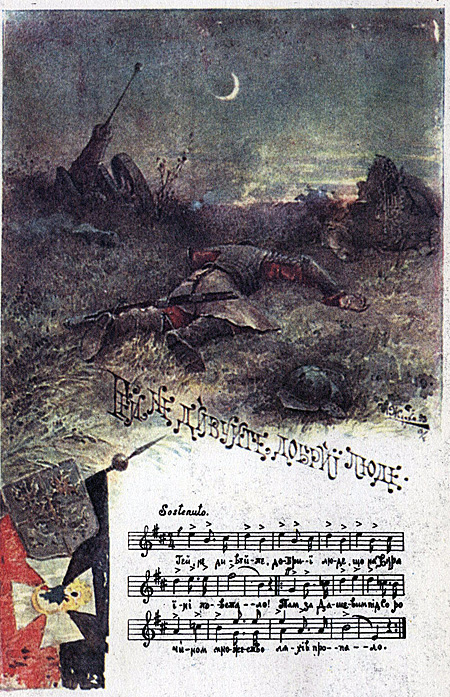
"Hei, ne dyvuite, dobrii liudy".
English: "Hey, don't be surprised, good people". Amvrosiy Zhdakha 1911–1914

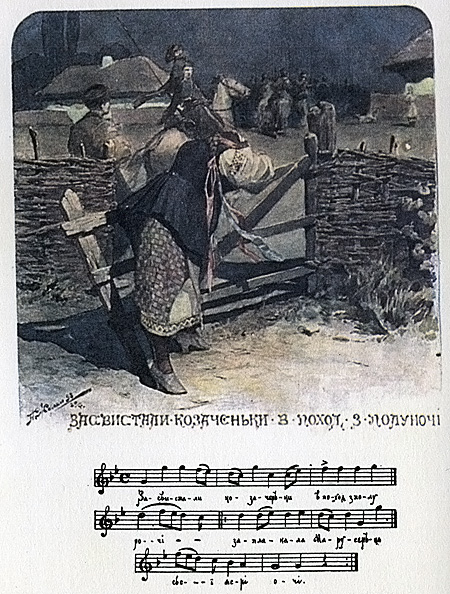
"Zasvystaly kozachenky v pokhod z polunochi".
English: "Cossacks whistled during a march at midnight". Amvrosiy Zhdakha 1911–1914

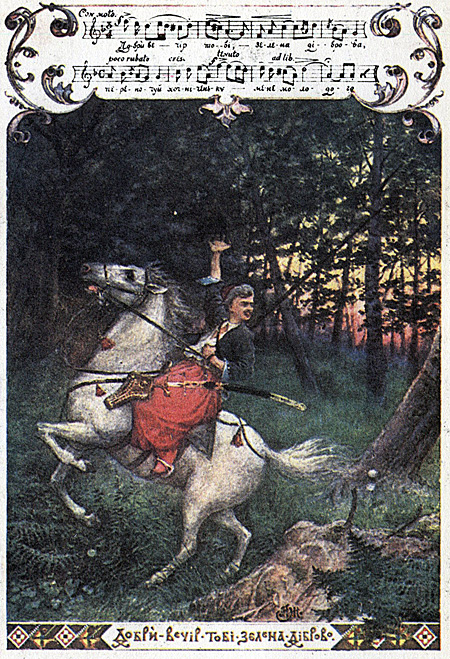
"Dobryi vechir tobi, zelena dibrovo".
English: "Good evening to you, green oak forest". Amvrosiy Zhdakha 1911–1914

== Cultural importance ==
=== Dnipropetrovsk Oblast ===
Cossack’s songs of Dnipropetrovsk Region
- UNESCO Intangible Cultural Heritage
- Country: Ukraine
- Reference: 01194
- Region: Europe and North America

Inscription history
- Inscription: 2016 (11th session)
- List: Need of Urgent Safeguarding

Cossack's songs of Dnipropetrovsk Region (Ukrainian: Козацькі пісні Дніпропетровщини), which are Zaporozhian Cossack songs of Dnipropetrovsk Oblast, are listed as an intangible cultural heritage in need of urgent safeguarding. Work on the nomination dossier for the inscription of Cossack songs in the UNESCO Intangible Cultural Heritage List began in 2014. On 28 November 2016, the Committee for the Protection of Intangible Cultural Heritage List included Cossack's songs of the Dnipropetrovsk region on the List of Intangible Cultural Heritage in Need of Urgent Safeguarding. According to the committee, these works, sung by Cossack communities in the region, talk about the tragedy of war and the personal experiences of soldiers. The lyrics maintain spiritual ties with the past, but are also entertaining. Cossack songs traditionally involve male singing. Cossack songs are nowadays often performed by women, but rarely in mixed groups. UNESCO's list mentions the choral groups Krynytsia, Bohuslavochka, and Pershotsvit. The settlements of Kocherezhky, Bohuslav, Pidhorodnie, Shulhivka, and Sorochyn retain the tradition.

== See also ==
- Duma (epic)
