= Mikulski =

Mikulski (feminine Mikulska) is a Polish surname. Notable people include:

- Albin Mikulski (born 1957), Polish football manager
- Aleksandra Mikulska (born 1981), Polish classical pianist
- Barbara Mikulski (born 1936), American politician and social worker
- Stanisław Mikulski (1929–2014), Polish theatre, television and cinema actor
- Zbigniew Mikulski (1925–2017), Polish philatelist
