= Moshoryne =

Village in Kirovohrad Oblast, Ukraine

Moshoryne Мошорине
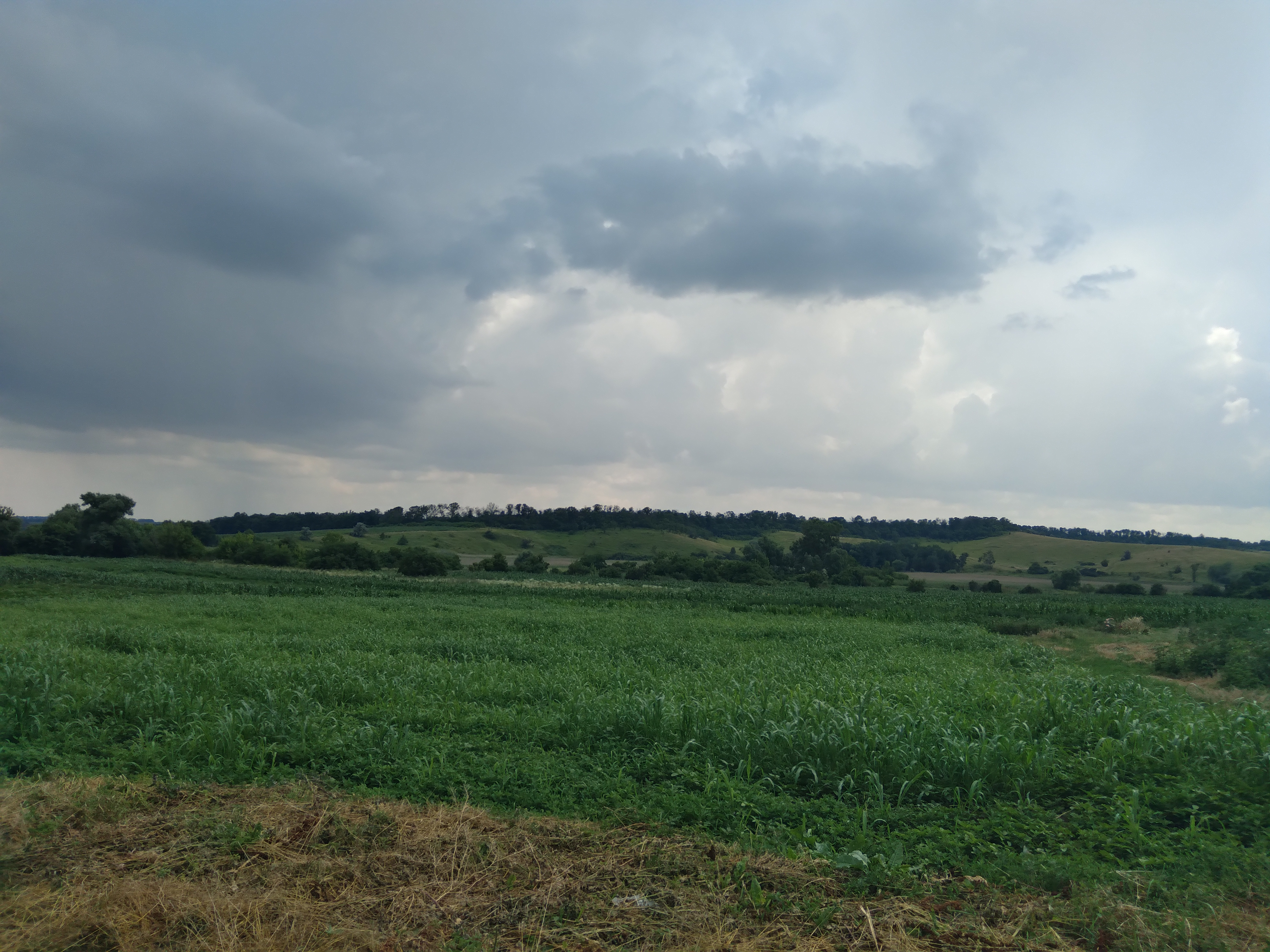

- Location within Ukraine Location within Ukraine Kirovohrad Oblast
- Coordinates: 48°42′49″N 32°40′24″E
- Country: Ukraine
- Oblast: Kirovohrad Oblast
- Raion: Kropyvnytskyi Raion
- Founded: 1752

Area
  - Total: 8,043 km^{2} (3,105 sq mi)

Population (2022)
  - Total: 1,600
  - Density: 0.20/km^{2} (0.52/sq mi)
- Postal code: 27453

Moshoryne (Ukrainian: Мошорине) is a village in central Ukraine, Kropyvnytskyi Raion, Kirovohrad Oblast, in Subottsi rural hromada. It has a population of 1,600 (2022 estimate).

== Geography ==
The Beshka River flows through the territory of the village

== History ==
The village was founded by Serbian immigrants in the middle of the 18th century, probably from the Serbian village of Moshoryn, and they named the local river Beshka, probably after the village of Beshka in Serbia, where the immigrants could have come from.

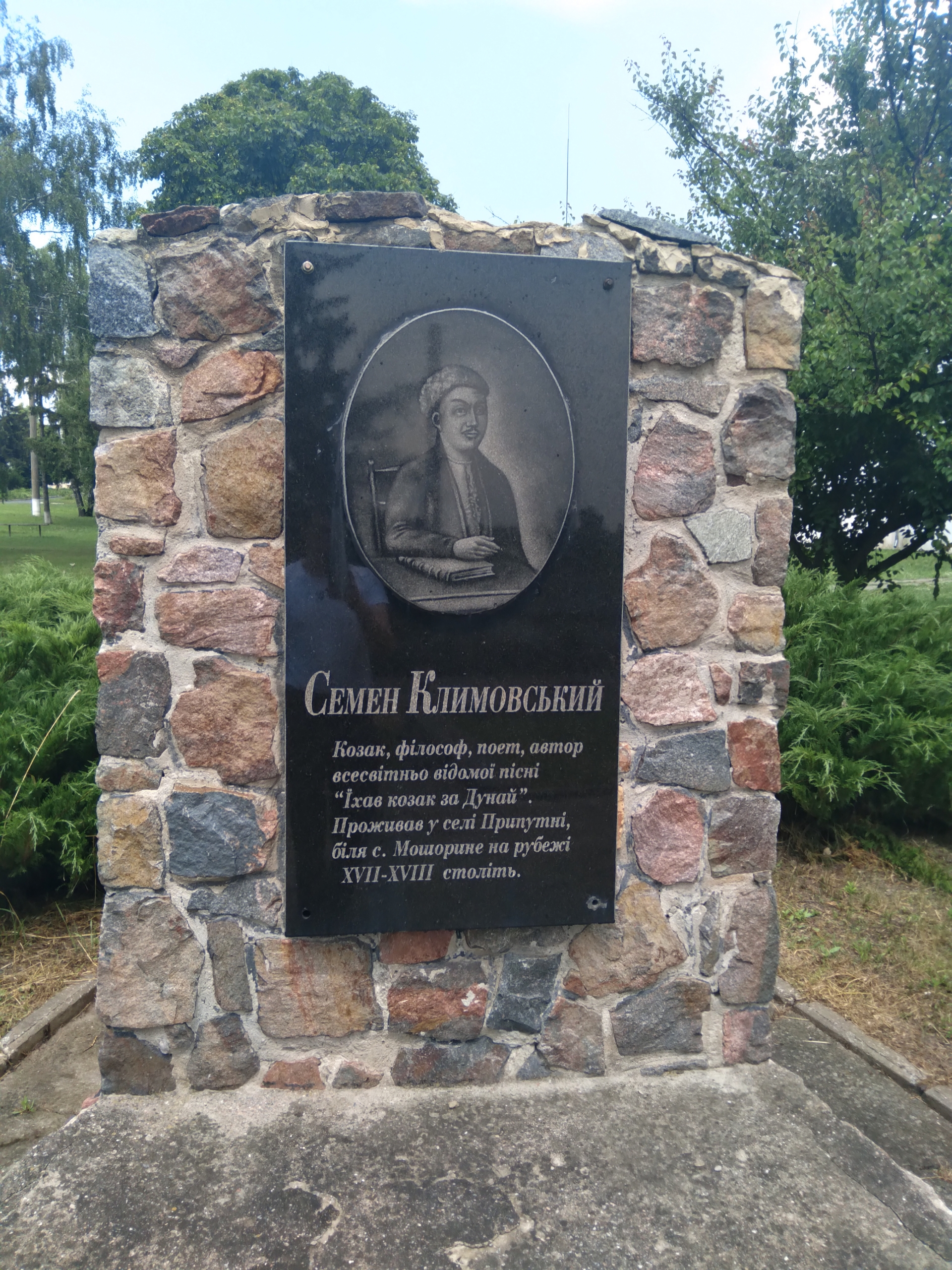
It was in this village that the author of the famous Ukrainian folk song "a Cossack went across the Danube" (Semen Klymovsky) lived

In 1772 there were 121 houses.

In 1886, there were 3359 inhabitants in 536 farm households; there were an Orthodox church, a school, and 9 stores.

During the Holodomor of 1932–1933, at least 26 villagers died. According to the recollections of a local resident, Olena Yermolenko (1913-2002): "Every day in 1933, on my way home from work, I saw people lying by the road from the collective farm, from whom the Soviet soldiers had taken their last bread: adults, old people, children: after a long period of starvation, their bellies had swelled and cracked, and liquid flowed from the cracks. They suffered for several weeks, their bodies were secretly buried outside the village. Several hundred other families in Moshoryne, who owned their own farms, were recognized by the government as "kurkuls" and were imprisoned or shot".

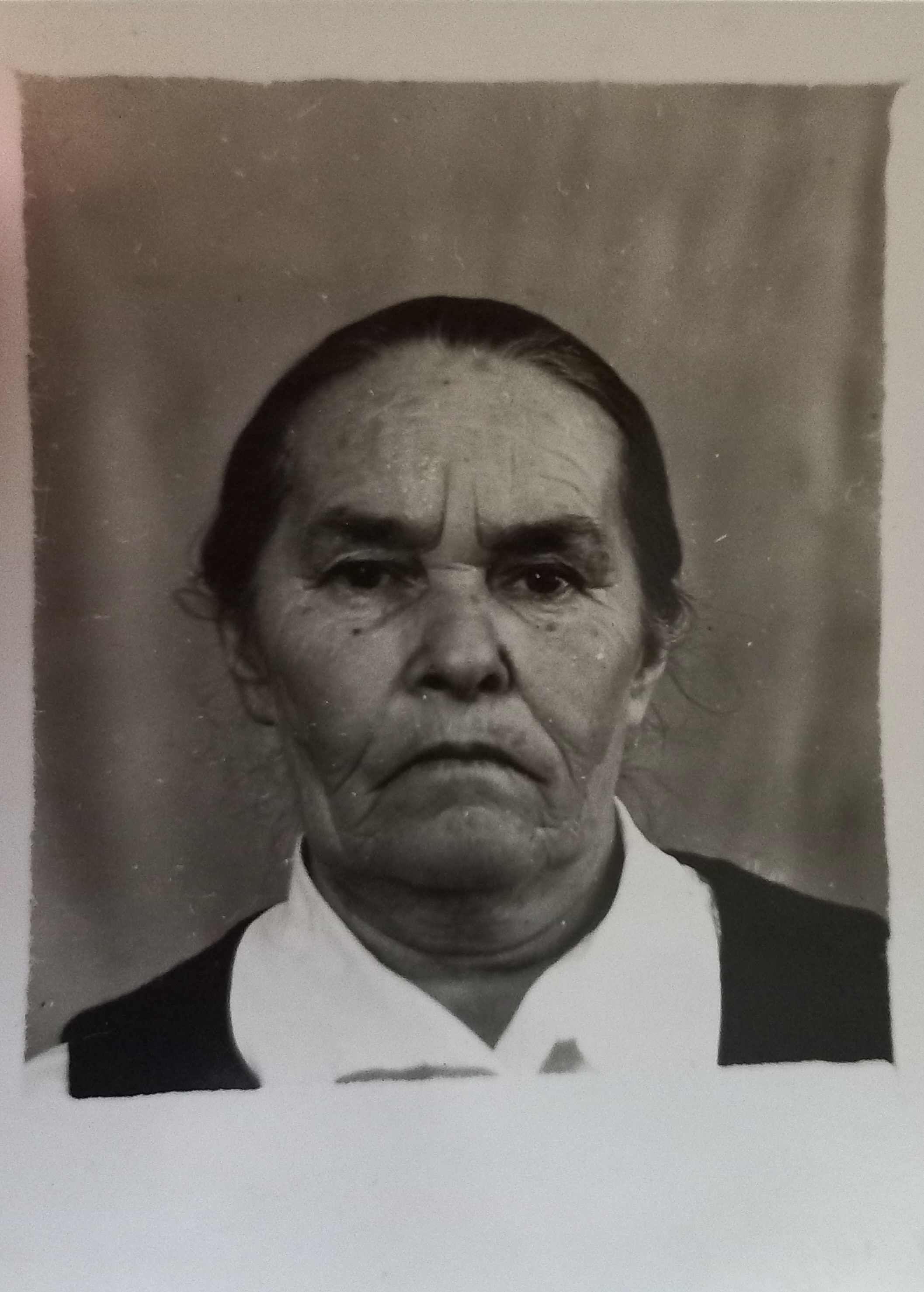
Olena Yermolenko

In 1943, during the battles of the World War II, according to the recollections of Olena Yermolenko (1913-2002), "cows stood in blood up to the level of their bellies" (the entire surrounding area was smeared with human blood). Also here was born Lukia Stachenko (1879-1973), a fighter who helped the Soviet partisans during the German occupation.

== Gallery ==
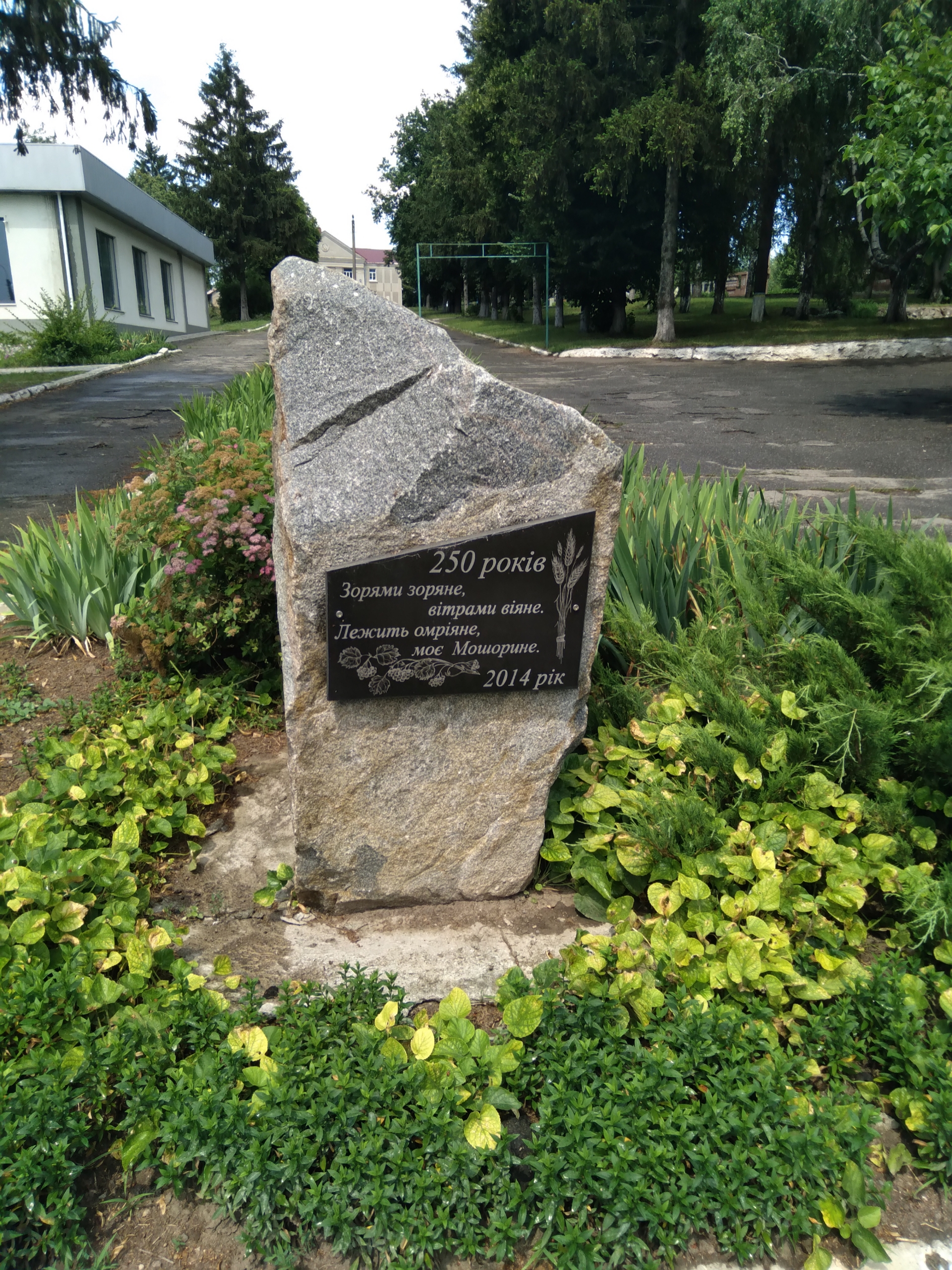
a monument to the 250th anniversary of the village

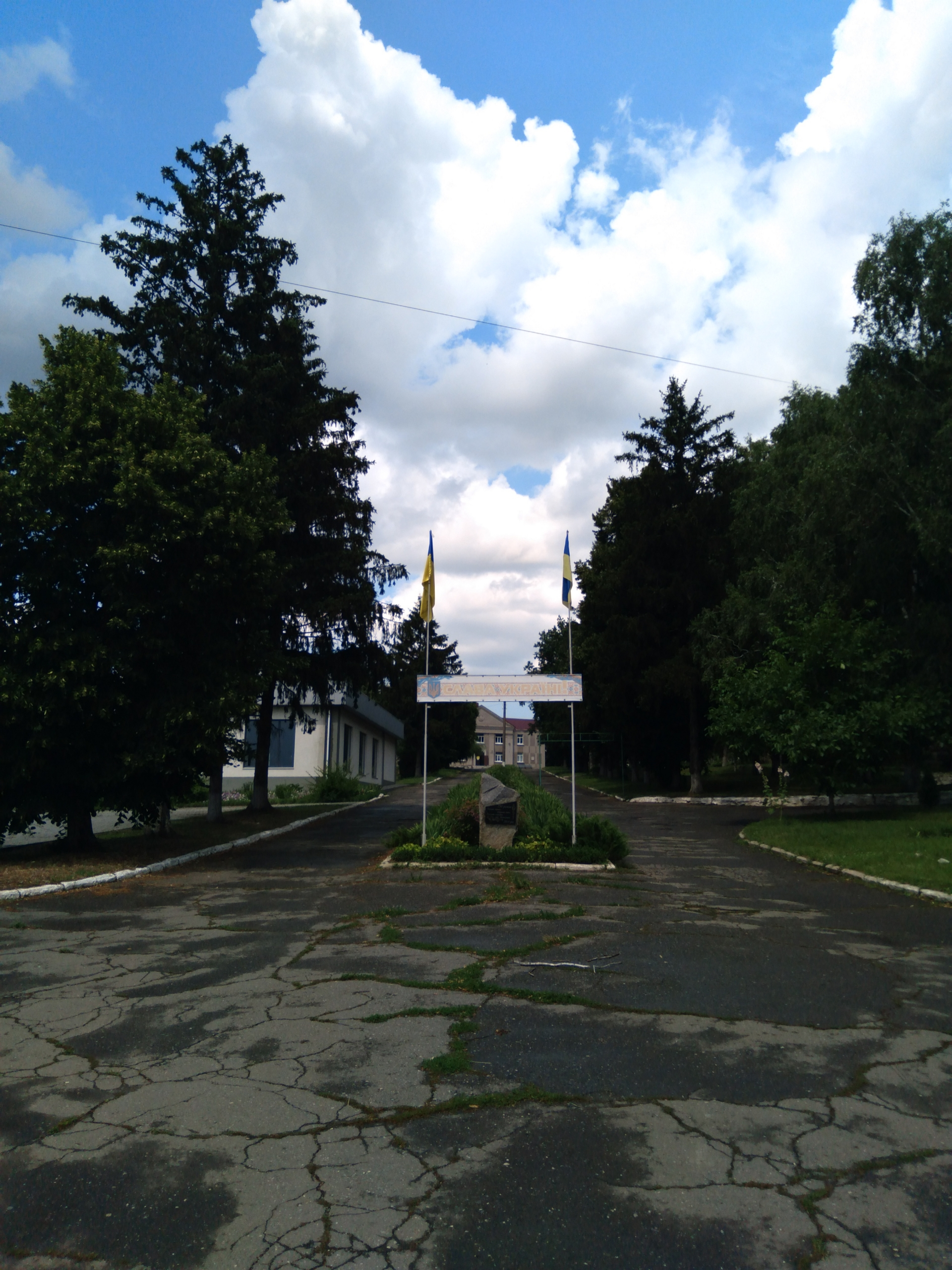
administrative building

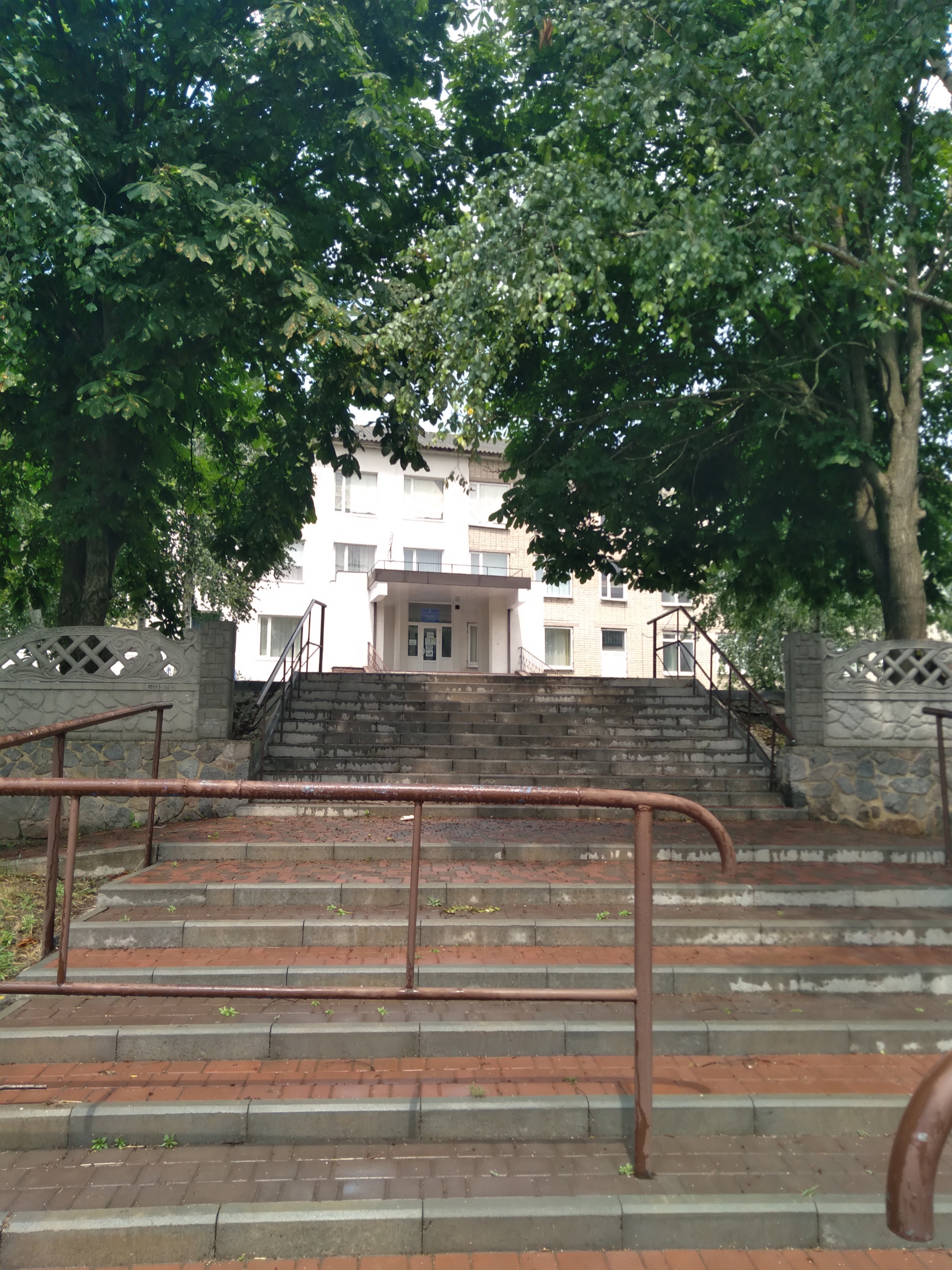
school

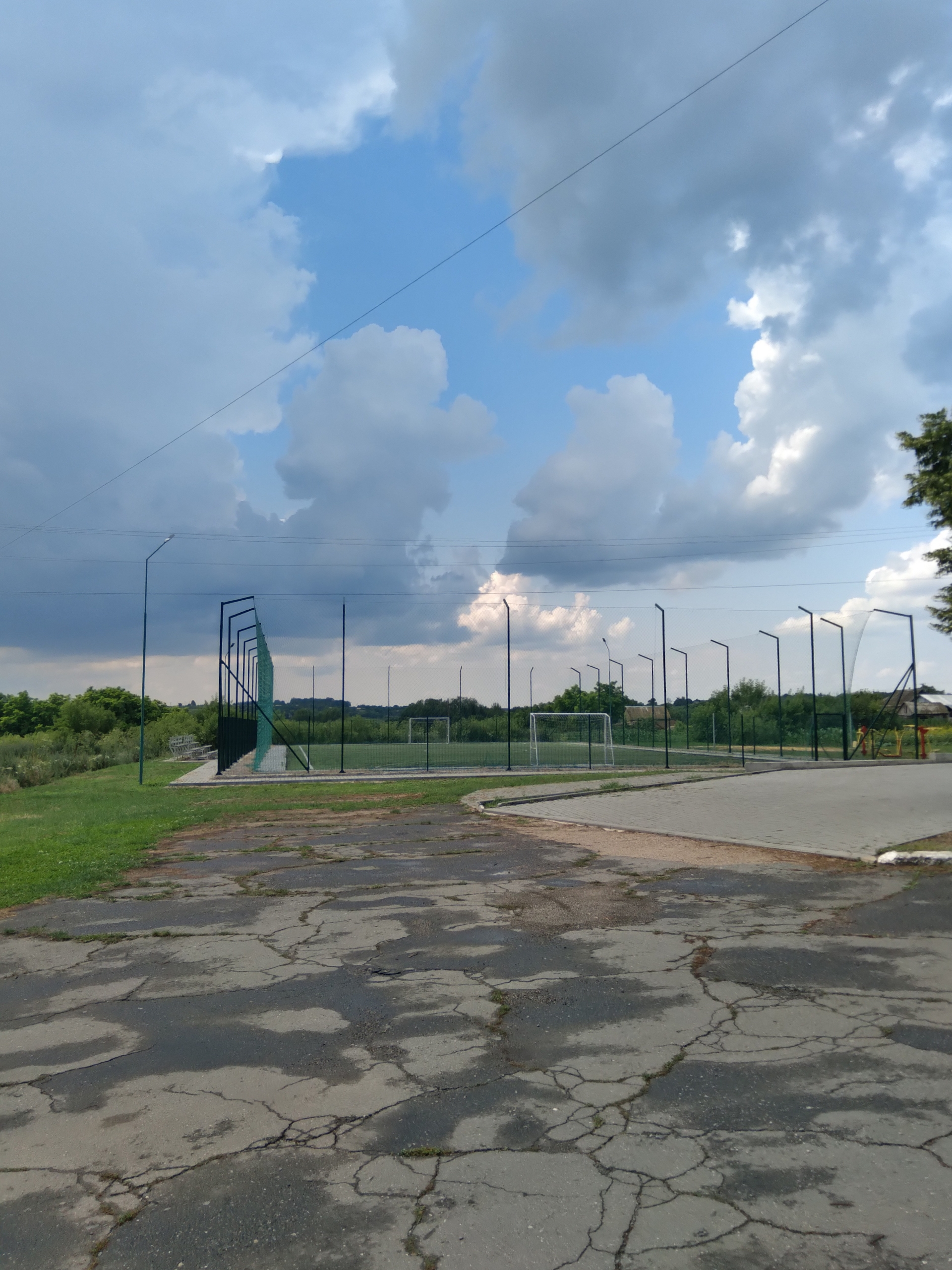
football field

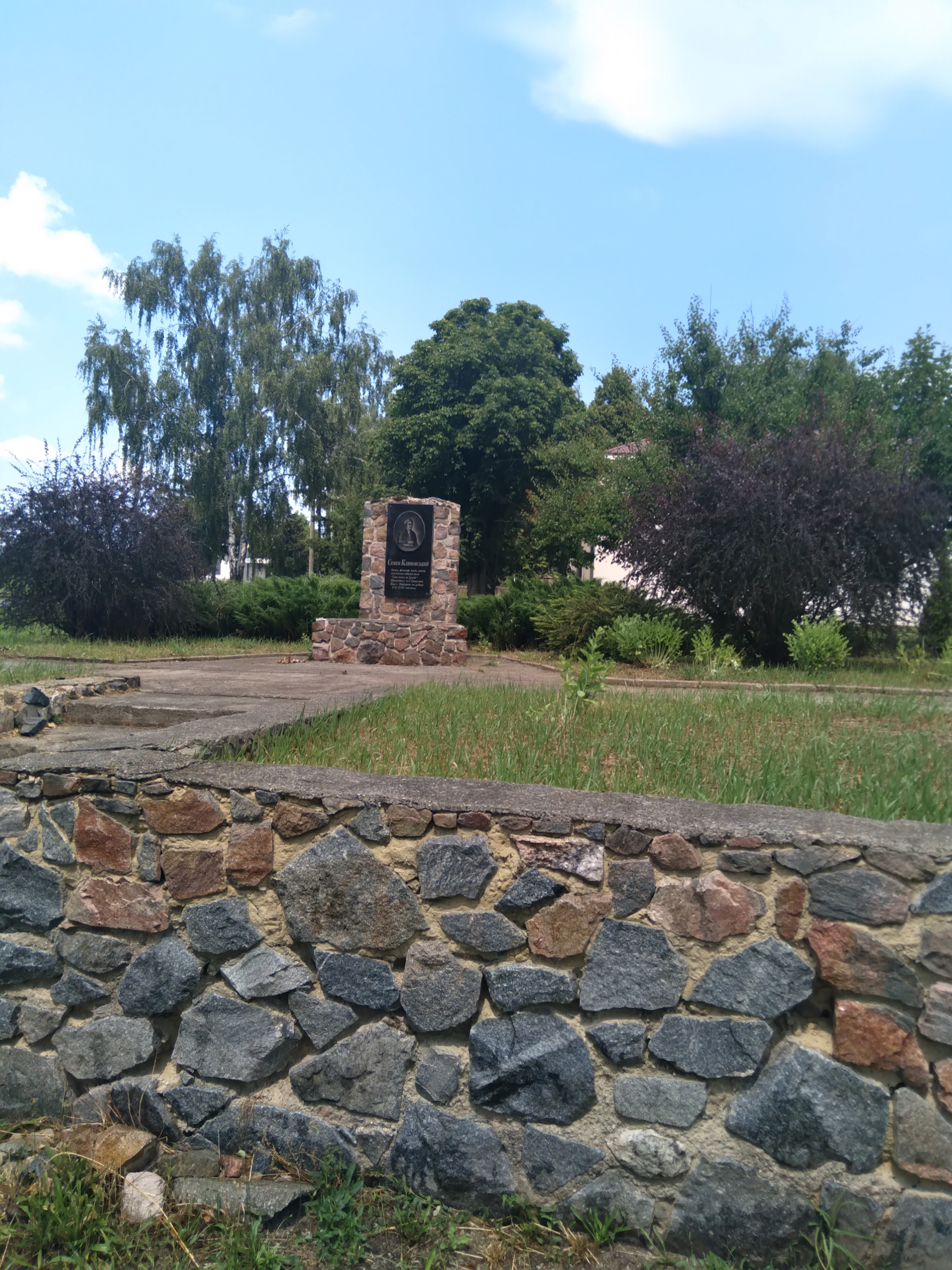
memorial to Semen Klymovsky

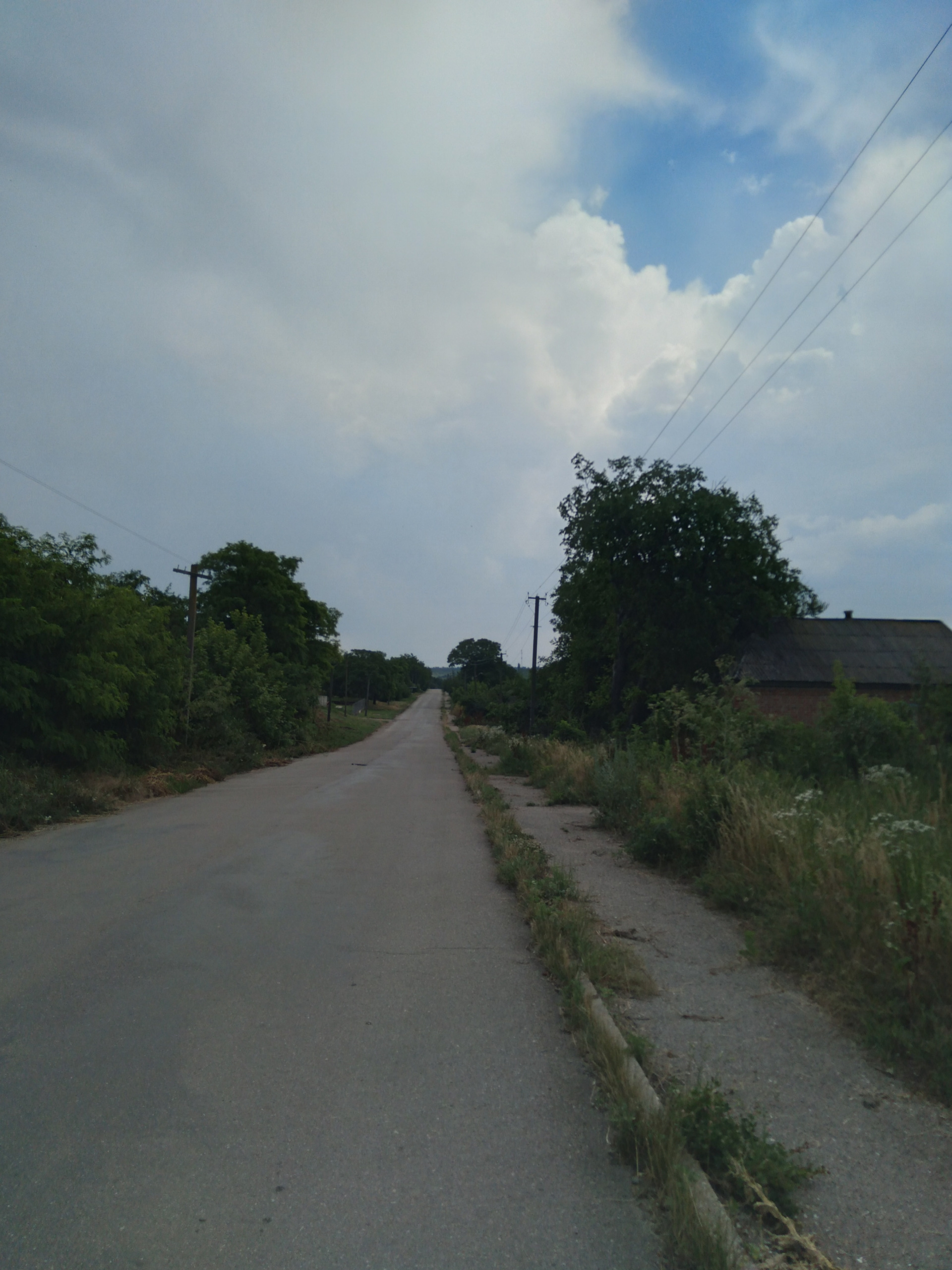
central street

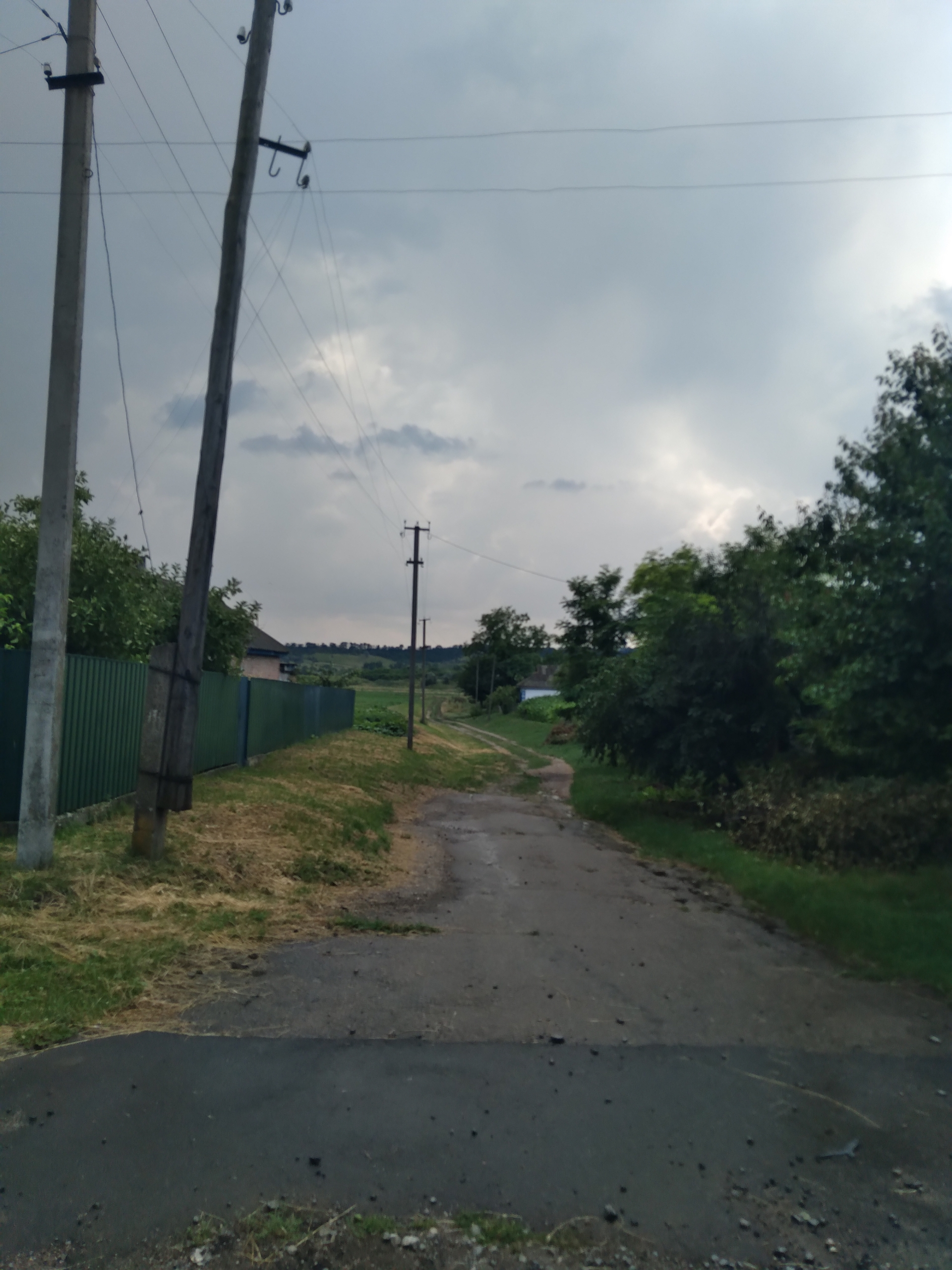
lane

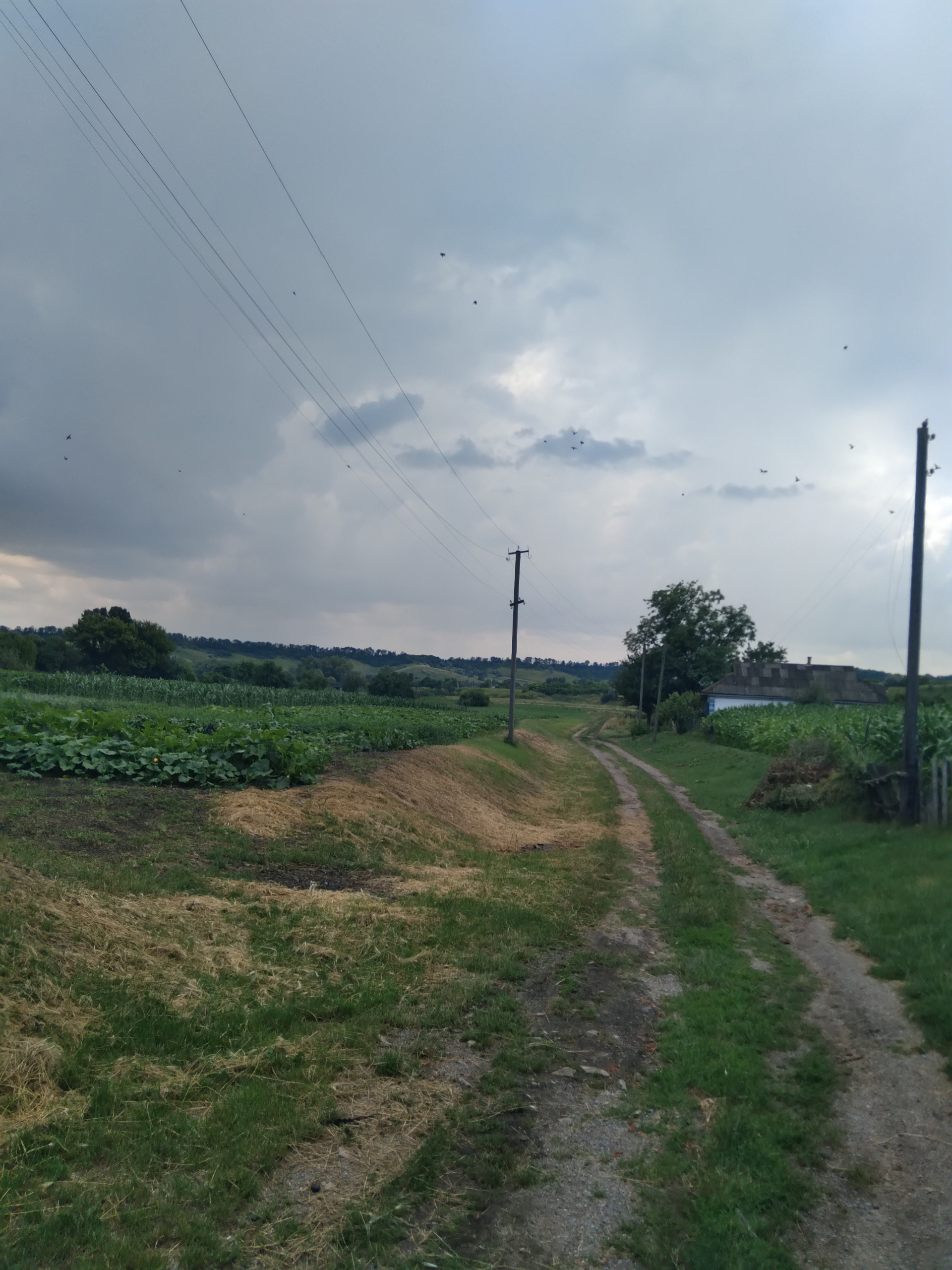
landscape

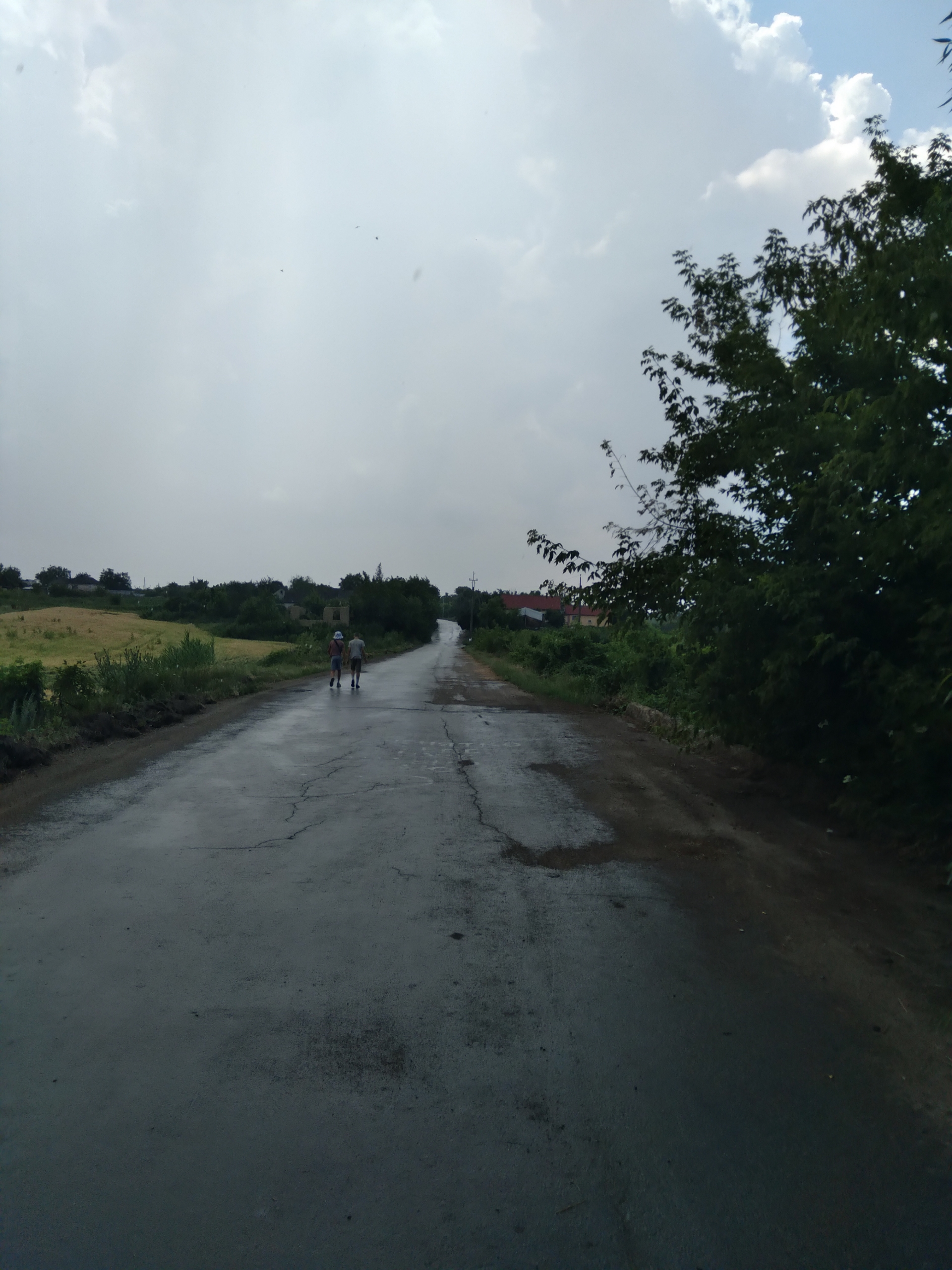
a bridge over the Beshka River

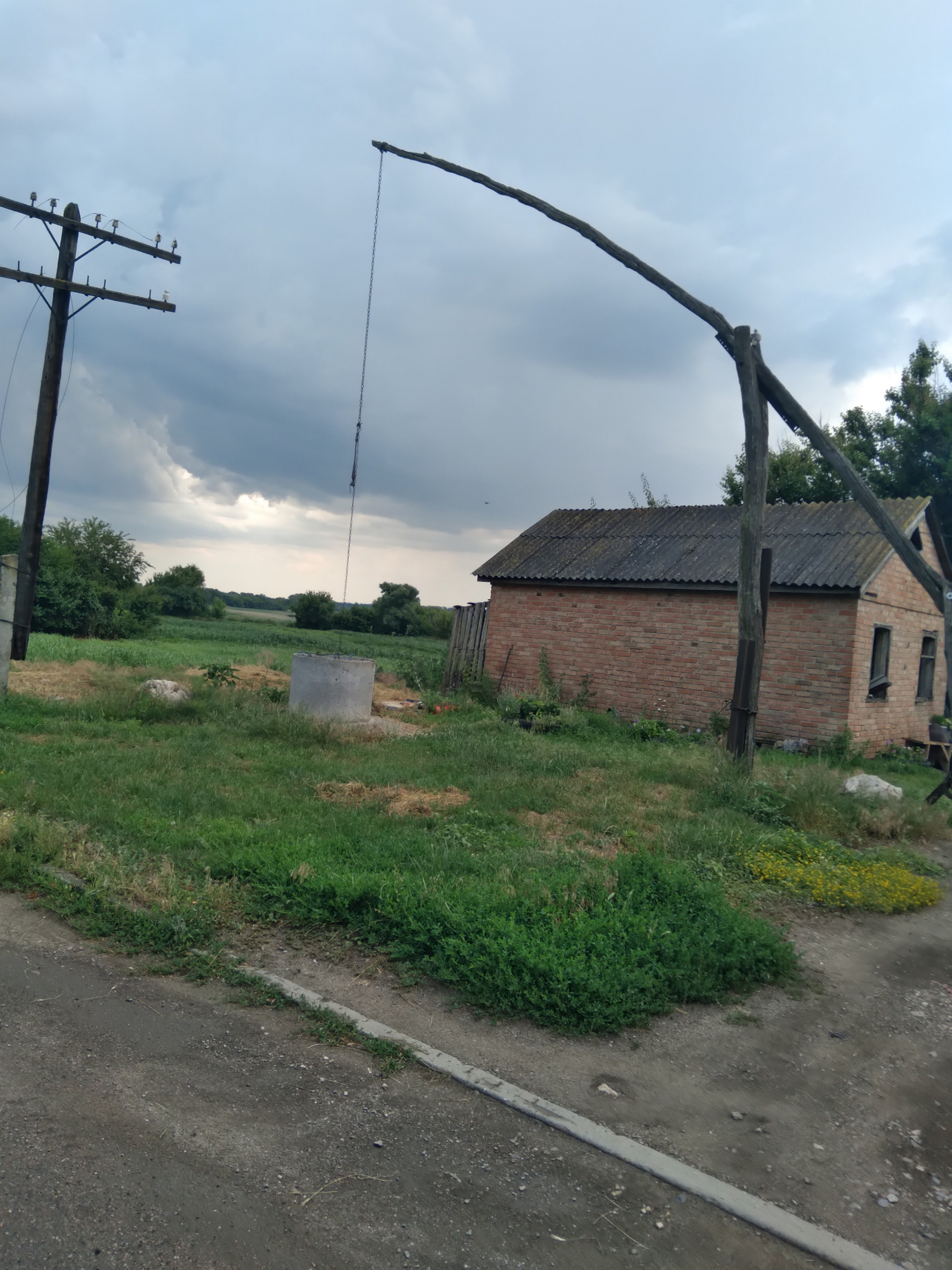
one of the wells

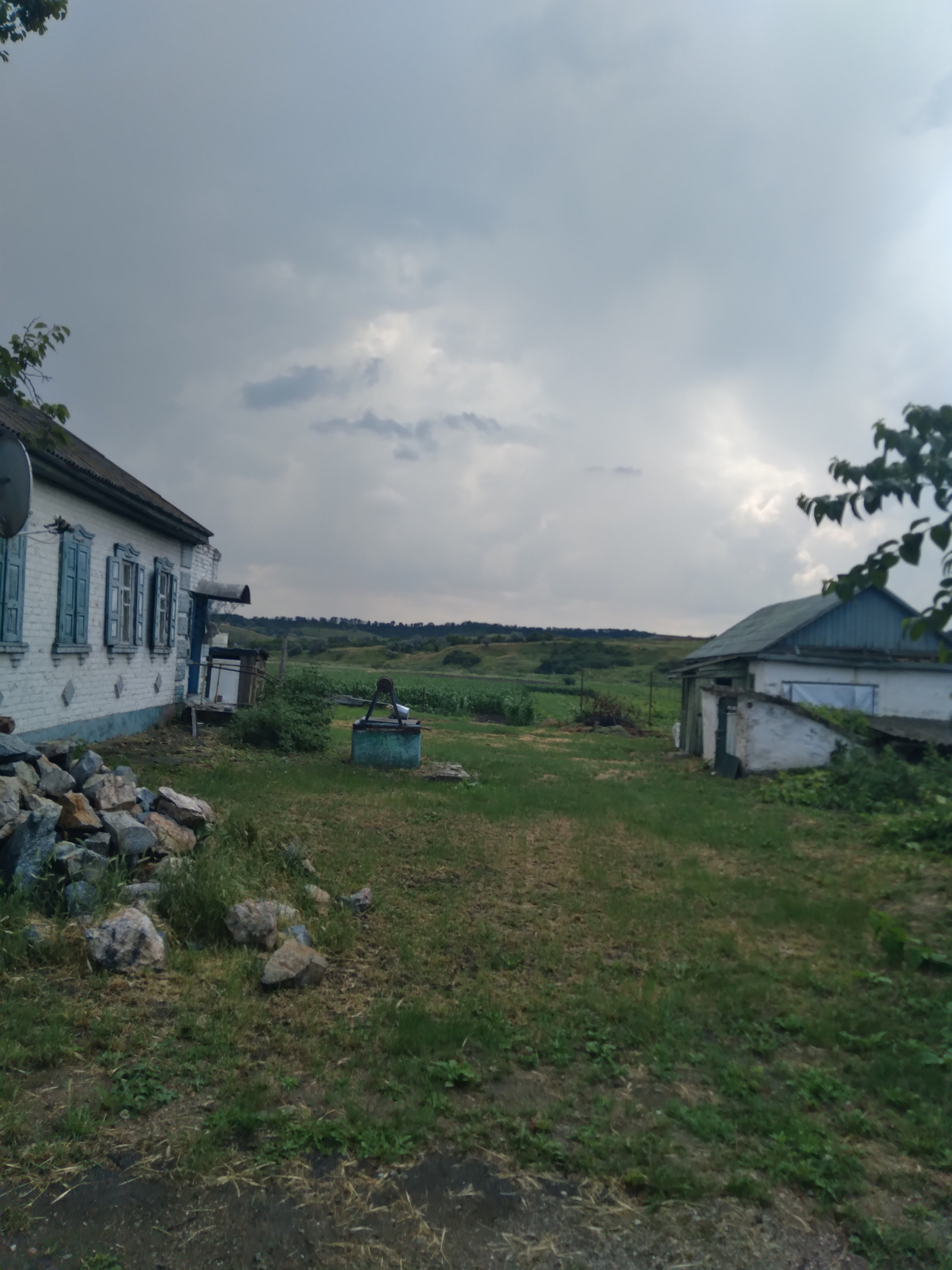
abandoned yard

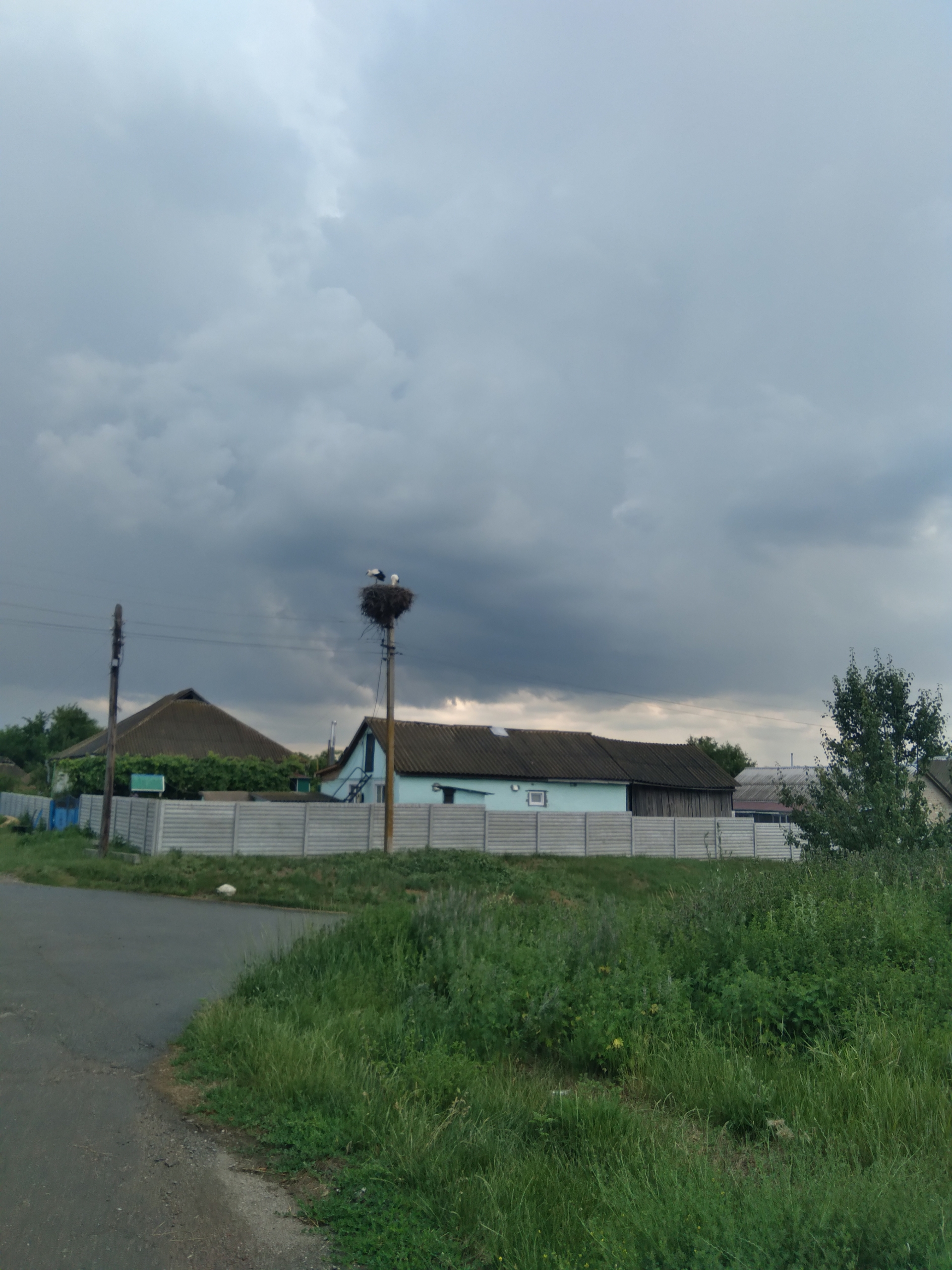
stork's nest

== Notes ==
- Кількість наявного населення по кожному сільському населеному пункту, Кіровоградська область (осіб) - Регіон, Рік (2001(05.12)). database.ukrcensus.gov.ua. Банк даних Державної служби статистики України.
- Розподіл населення за рідною мовою, Кіровоградська область (у % до загальної чисельності населення) - Регіон, Рік, Вказали у якості рідної мову (2001(05.12)). database.ukrcensus.gov.ua. Банк даних Державної служби статистики України.
