= Glanes de Woronince =

Suite for piano by Franz Liszt

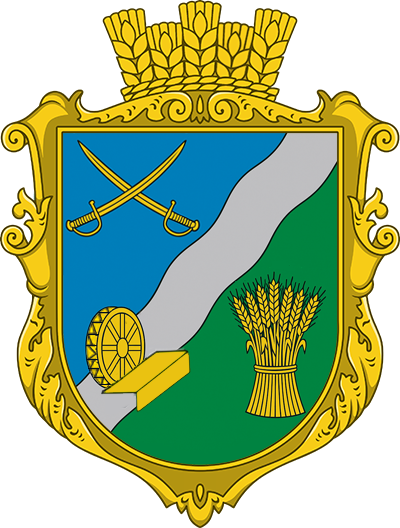
Coat of arms of Voronivtsi

Glanes de Woronince (Gleanings from Woronińce, or Harvest at Woronińce), S. 249, is a suite of three piano pieces by Franz Liszt, written in 1847 at Woronińce, now Voronivtsi (Ukrainian: Воронівці), the Ukrainian estate of Princess Carolyne zu Sayn-Wittgenstein.

Liszt had first met the Princess when he played in Kyiv on 14 February of that year. She was recently separated from her husband, and she invited Liszt to spend some time on her estate in Podolia. He stayed for 10 days, then left for a concert tour, promising to return in the autumn. He came back around 18 September, and stayed till early January 1848. It was during these three months that Liszt's and Sayn-Wittgenstein's relationship developed to the stage that she planned to petition the tsar, Alexander II of Russia, for divorce, and marry Liszt. During this time, Liszt also completed much of his Harmonies poétiques et religieuses.

The three pieces of Glanes de Woronince are:

1. Ballade d'Ukraine, a dumka based on Ikhav Kozak za Dunaj
2. Mélodies polonaises, two Polish folk songs, the second of which was previously composed 'by Frédéric Chopin "A Maiden's Wish" ("Życzenie"), Op. posth. 74/1, written in 1829
3. Complainte, another dumka.

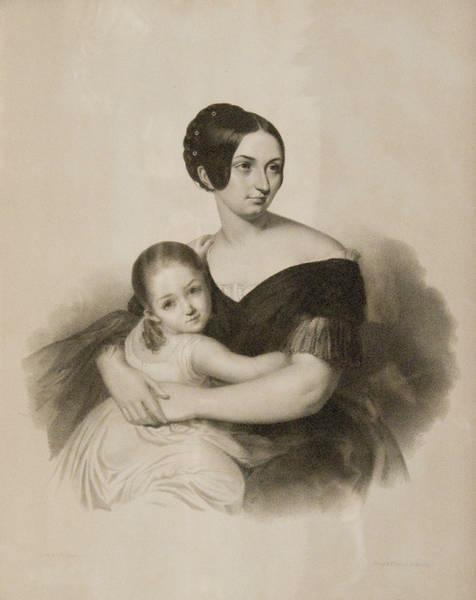
Carolyne von Sayn-Wittgenstein and her daughter (around 1840)

They were dedicated to Princess Carolyne's daughter, Princess Marie von Sayn-Wittgenstein.

Liszt also wrote a transcription for piano solo of Chopin's "A Maiden's Wish" in his Six Chants polonais, S. 480, but in conception it is quite a different piece from its appearance in Glanes de Woronince.

The suite has had few recordings. They include those by Robert Black, France Clidat, Leslie Howard, and Aleksandra Mikulska. The middle number was recorded by Conrad Ansorge, a pupil of Liszt, in a version which does not exactly correspond to the original text.
