= The Steep Banks Overflowed =

"Rozlylysja kruti berezhechky"
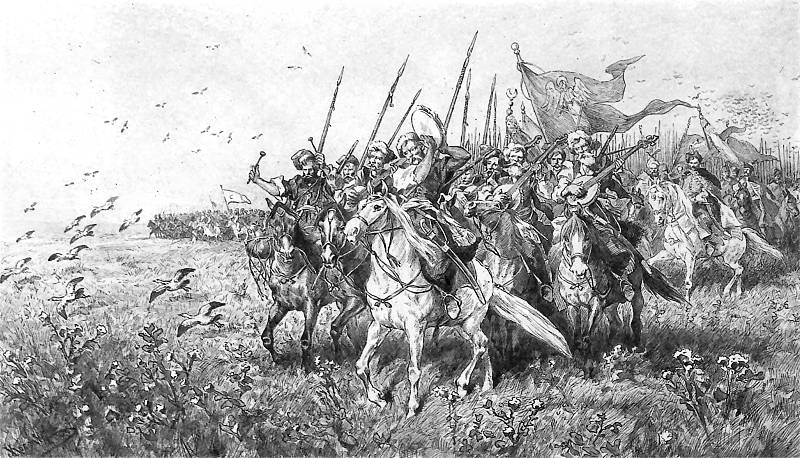

Song
- Language: Ukrainian
- English title: The Steep Banks Overflowed
- Released: 17th century
- Genre: Cossack song

The Steep Banks Overflowed (Note: According to Starshova & Myronenko (2024). Other English translations include The Steep Banks (Are) Flooded, "The Steep Streams Spilled", and "Oh, the river overflows the steep banks".) (Ukrainian: Розлилися круті бережечки, romanized: Rozlylysja kruti berezhechky (Note: According to DSTU 9112:2021 system B.) (Note: Other transcriptions include Rozlylysia kruti berezhechky or Rozlilisya kruti berezhechki.)) is a popular Ukrainian Cossack historical folk song from the mid-17th century. The lyrics of the final part of The Steep Banks Overflowed were later reused in 1875 as the opening lines of Oi u luzi chervona kalyna, a popular patriotic song sometimes called the unofficial "second national anthem of Ukraine".

== History ==
The folk composition The Steep Banks Overflowed dates from the mid-17th century Khmelnytskyi Uprising. The most popular variant of the song was recorded by Volodymyr Antonovych and Mykhailo Drahomanov during their ethnographic studies in 1875 in the village of Marianivka, then part of Yelysavethrad county, Kherson Governorate.

The text was probably composed in the mid-17th century, on the eve of or at the start of the Khmelnytsky Uprising. The theme of the work, by providing an insight into Ukraine’s situation at the time, calls for an armed struggle for a better future.

In 1875, the song was published by Fritz's printing house in Kyiv in the collection «Историческія пѣсни малорусскаго народа. Пѣсни о борьбѣ съ Поляками при Богданѣ Хмельницкомъ.» ("Historical Songs of the Little Russian People. Songs about the struggle against the Poles under Bohdan Khmelnytsky."), with commentary by Mykhailo Drahomanov and Volodymyr Antonovych. Soon thereafer, in the 1880s, the arrangement for male choir was made by Mykola Lysenko.

In 1914, just before the First World War broke out, the director and producer of the Ukrainska Besida Theatre in Lviv, Stepan Charnetskyi, decided that the final verses of the song Rozlylysya kruti berezhechky became the opening of a new patriotic choral piece, Oi u luzi chervona kalyna:

Rozlylysja kruti berezhechky / The Steep Banks Overflowed
Ukrainian original (1875)
Ukrainian Latin alphabet
English translation

Гей, у лузі червона калина, / Гей, гей, похилилася;
Чогось наша славна Україна, / Гей, гей, засмутилася.

Hej, u luzi chervona kalyna, / Hej, hej, pokhylylasja;
Chohosj nasha slavna Ukrajina, / Hej, hej, zasmutylasja

Hey, in the meadow a red kalyna / Hey, hey, has bent down low,
For some reason, our glorious Ukraine / Hey, hey, is in sorrow.

А ми ж тую червону калину, / Гей, гей, та піднімемо;
А ми ж свою славну Україну, / Гей, гей, та розвеселимо!

A my zh tuju chervonu kalynu, / Hej, hej, pidnimemo,
A my zh svoju slavnu Ukrajinu, / Hej, hej, ta rozveselymo!

And we will take that red kalyna / Hey, hey, and we will raise it up,
And our glorious Ukraine / Hey, hey, we shall cheer up!

Oi u luzi chervona kalyna / Oh, the Red Viburnum in the Meadow
Ukrainian original (1914)

Ой у лузі червона калина похилилася,
Чогось наша славна Україна зажурилася.
А ми тую червону калину підіймемо,
А ми нашу славну Україну, гей-гей, розвеселимо!

Ukrainian Latin alphabet

Oj u luzi chervona kalyna pochylylasja,
Chohosj nasha slavna Ukrajina zazhurylasja.
A my tuju chervonu kalynu pidijmemo,
A my nashu slavnu Ukrajinu, hej-hej, rozveselymo!

English translation

Oh, in the meadow a red kalyna has bent down low,
For some reason, our glorious Ukraine is in sorrow.
And we will take that red kalyna and we will raise it up,
And, hey-hey, we shall cheer up our glorious Ukraine!

In 1914, having staged Vasyl Pachovsky’s tragedy about Hetman Petro Doroshenko, The Sun of Ruin, Charnetskyi was dissatisfied with the final lamenting song Чи я в лузі не калина була? (Chy ya v luzi ne kalyna bula?, "Was I not a viburnum in the meadow?"). To give the play a more optimistic ending, Charnetskyi incorporated the song Rozlylysja kruti berezhechky into the drama. He altered the lyrics slightly so that they would fit better with the play's narrative. However, he left the final verse unchanged. In addition, Stepan Charnetskyi composed a new melody for the song, one reminiscent of folk music.

The song soon gained popularity among the Galician youth. Lieutenant Hryhoriy Trukh of the Ukrainian Sich Riflemen, having heard the final verse of the song in Charnetsky’s adaptation, added three more stanzas to it. The two songs were merged, linking two different historical eras. Oi u luzi chervona kalyna became a popular song among the Ukrainian Sich Riflemen, and eventually their anthem.

In modern times, the song took on new meanings. Instead of ‘glorious Cossacks’, the lyrics now feature ‘our volunteers’.

Following the Declaration of Independence of Ukraine in 1991, Oi u luzi chervona kalyna became one of several unofficial anthems of Ukraine. Another arrangement of the piece was created by Bohdan Sapelyuk, who composed one of the first marches for the Ukrainian Armed Forces military band, combining motifs from the melodies of Chervona Kalyna by Charnetskyi and "Let's Fill, Brothers, the Crystal Cups" by Viktor Lisovol.

Thus, the patriotic theme of this folk song embodies the centuries-old traditions of Ukrainian freedom fighters.

== Text ==
Ukrainian original (1875)	Ukrainian Latin alphabet	English translation
Розлилися круті бережечки, Гей, гей, по роздоллі; Пожурились славні козаченьки, Гей, гей, у неволі.	Rozlylysja kruti berezhechky, Hej, hej, po rozdolli; Pozhurylysj slavni kozachenjky, Hej, hej, u nevoli.	The steep banks overflowed, Hey, hey, across the open plain; The glorious Cossacks were in sorrow, Hey, hey, in captivity.
Гей ви, хлопці, ви, добрі молодці, Гей, гей, не журіться, Посідлайте коні воронії. Гей, гей, садовіться!	Hej vy, khlopci, vy, dobri molodci, Hej, hej, ne zhuritjsja, Posidlajte koni voroniji. Hej, hej, sadovitjsja!	Hey you, guys, you fine fellows Hey, hey, don't despair, Saddle the black horses. Hey, hey, seat yourselves!
Та поїдем у чистеє поле, Гей, гей, у Варшаву; Та наберем червоної китайки, Гей, гей, та на славу!	Ta pojidem u chysteje pole, Hej, hej, u Varshavu; Ta naberem chervonoji kytajky, Hej, hej, ta na slavu!	We will head out into the open field, Hey, hey, to Warsaw; And take the red kytajka, (Note: A red silken flag. The word китайка (kytajka or kytaika) literally means "Chinese". It was a generic early modern term for a lightweight silk fabric from China (Китай, Kytaj), usually coloured blue or red. In this case, it is explicitly 'red': червона, chervona. It is connected to the word червоніла (chervonila), literally "becomes red", but in context it means "the red kytajka catches the eye". Thus, when the red flag catches the eye, the Cossack glory is on display. In the last verses, the червона калина (chervona kalyna, "red viburnum", meaning the Viburnum opulus or guelder rose) is connected to the glory of Ukraine.); Hey, hey, for glory!
Гей, щоб наша червона китайка, Гей, гей, не злиняла, Та щоб наша козацькая слава, Гей, гей, не пропала!	Hej, shchob nasha chervona kytajka, Hej, hej, ne zlynjala, Ta shchob nasha kozacjkaja slava, Hej, hej, ne propala!	Hey, so that our red kytajka, Hey, hey, does not lose its colour, And so that our Cossack glory, Hey, hey, does not disappear!
Гей, щоб наша червона китайка, Гей, гей, червоніла, А щоб наша козацькая слава, Гей, гей, не змарніла!	Hej, shchob nasha chervona kytajka, Hej, hej, chervonila, A shchob nasha kozacjkaja slava, Hej, hej, ne zmarnila!	Hey, so that our red kytajka, Hey, hey, catches the eye, And so that our Cossack glory, Hey, hey, does not fade away!
Гей, у лузі червона калина, Гей, гей, похилилася; Чогось наша славна Україна, Гей, гей, засмутилася.	Hej, u luzi chervona kalyna, Hej, hej, pokhylylasja; Chohosj nasha slavna Ukrajina, Hej, hej, zasmutylasja	Hey, in the meadow a red kalyna Hey, hey, has bent down low, For some reason, our glorious Ukraine; Hey, hey, is in sorrow.
А ми ж тую червону калину, Гей, гей, та піднімемо; А ми ж свою славну Україну, Гей, гей, та розвеселимо!	A my zh tuju chervonu kalynu, Hej, hej, ta pidnimemo, A my zh svoju slavnu Ukrajinu, Hej, hej, ta rozveselymo!	And we will take that red kalyna Hey, hey, and we will raise it up, And our glorious Ukraine; Hey, hey, we shall cheer up!

== In literature ==
In the early 2000s, Raisa Ivanchenko wrote a novella of the same name based on the song Rozlylysya kruti berezhechky.

== See also ==
- Cossack songs
- Oi u luzi chervona kalyna

== Literature ==
- Harmash, Liudmyla (2023). "Reflections of War Experience in Ukrainian Songs". Napis Pismo poświęcone literaturze okolicznościowej i użytkowej. 1: 203–217. doi:10.18318/napis.2023.1.10.
- Kovtun, Kateryna (29 November 2023). "Oi u luzi chervona kalyna ("Oh, the Red Viburnum in the Meadow") as an Anthem-Song: Social Roles and Genre Transformations in the Time of War". Artistic Culture. Topical Issues. 19 (2): 74–79. doi:10.31500/1992-5514.19(2).2023.294625. ISSN 2618-0987.
- Shablovsky, Yevhen Stepanovych (1970). Ukrainian Literature Through the Ages. Mistetstvo Publishers. pp. 34–35.
- Starshova, Oksana; Myronenko, Polina (1 June 2024). "The Role of Popular Culture in Times of Disaster: A Case Study of the War Morale Songs in the Russo-Ukrainian War". East-West Cultural Passage. 24 (1): 110–132. doi:10.2478/ewcp-2024-0007. ISSN 2067-5712.
- П. Д. Павлій та інші «Українські народні думи та історичні пісні.» К; Видавництво АН УРСР, 1955, 700 с.
