= Diane Andersen =

Belgian pianist

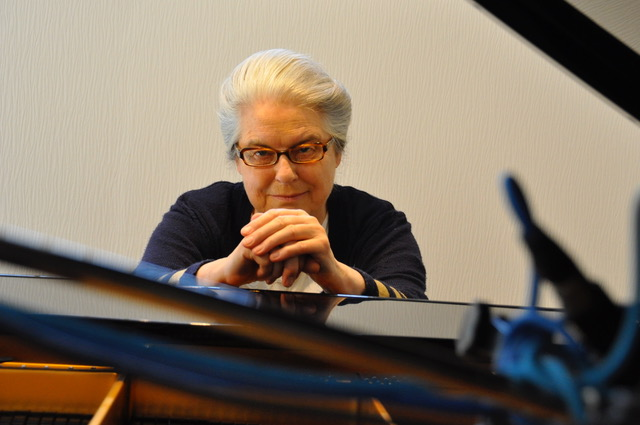
- Born: 5 July 1934; Copenhagen
- Education: Royal Conservatory of Brussels
- Occupation: pianist
- Employer: Royal Conservatory of Brussels
- Spouse: André Gertler
- Awards: knight of the order of the Crown
- Website: diane-andersen.org

Diane Andersen is a Danish born, Belgian classical concert pianist born in Copenhagen to a French mother and a Danish father.

== Early life and studies ==
Diane Andersen married André Gertler, a Belgian Hungarian born violinist, in 1958. She thus became a Belgian citizen.

Her musical education was influenced by pianists and musicians issues mainly from the Austrian-Hungarian piano school. Stefan Askenase, professor at the Royal Conservatory of Brussels a noted Chopin and Mozart player was a truly inspiring teacher for her. Diane graduated from the Royal Conservatory of Brussels at the age of 18. Later she took master classes with Edith Farnadi and the Hungarian pianist Annie Fischer. She had close contacts to composers Zoltan Kodaly, Alexandre Tansman, and Darius Milhaud.

== Performer and recording artist ==
During her career Andersen has played in Victoria Hall (Geneva), Centre for Fine Arts(Brussels), Liszt Ferenc Zeneakademia (Budapest), Concertgebouw (Amsterdam), Teatro della Fenice (Venice), Carnegie Hall (New York), Rudolfinum (Prague), St Martin-in-the-Fields (London) etc.

She performed and recorded regularly with violinist André Gertler, who was a friend and partner of Bela Bartok. The pair made a number of recordings of Bartok's works.

She performed under the baton of Bruno Maderna, Pierre Boulez, Wolfgang Sawallisch, Georges Prêtre, Jean Fournet, Okko Kanu, David Alexander Rahbee, and with Orchestre de la Suisse Romande, R.A.I. Roma, O.P.L. Liège, Orchestre National Belgium, Halle Symphony Orchestra (Germany), philharmonic orchestras of the Hilversum radios (Holland), Symphonic Orchestra of Erevan (Armenia).

Andersen was chosen to play the first performance of the Bartok cherzo for piano and orchestra in Western Europe under the baton of Berthold Lehman, at the request of Prof. Denijs Dille, founder of the Bartok Archivum in Budapest.

Andersen's recordings (EMI, Pavane, Cypres, Fuga Libera, Talent, EMS, Supraphon, Azur classical) have frequently included new or forgotten music, some in world premiere, including the complete piano work by Gabriel Pierné, Joseph Jongen, the piano music of Claude Delvincourt.

Andersen is an active chamber music player, and has recorded many CDs with works by Czerny, Alexandre Tansman (two pianos four hands), Adolphe Biarent, Joseph Jongen, Ernst Toch piano quintets with the Danel Quartet, also Toch Second Piano concerto with Halle Philharmonic Orchestra and Hans Rotman conducting, received positive reviews.

Andersen has premiered works by American composers Michael Slayton and Dianne Goolkasian Rahbee (the piano concerto and other pieces written specially for her). She recorded a CD with works written for her by Rahbee and works by Michel Lysight and Jacqueline Fontyn in Canada and Argentina.

Works have also been written for her by Alexandre Tansman (France), Béla Tardos (Hungary), René Defossez, Paul Uy, Berthe di Vito-Delvaux (Belgium), Denis Levaillant, and Damien Top (France).

With the "Ensemble Joseph Jongen", of which she is the founder, she has performed works by Andrzej Kwiecinski, Alain Weber, as well as rediscovered pieces by René de Castéra, Albert Roussel.

Andersen is president of EPTA-Belgium Wallonie-Bruxelles (European Piano Teachers Association) and honorary professor of the Royal Conservatory of Brussels. She has directed master classes in South and North America, Canada, Japan, in China, Korea and Europe. She is also regularly invited as a member of the jury of major international competitions. In particular, the Queen Elisabeth Piano Competition 2013) and 2016.

== Personal life ==
Andersen and Gertler separated in 1984.

== Discography (selection) ==
- Gabriel Pierné, Piano works - Diane Andersen, piano; (1979, format vinyl 5 33-1/3 tr/min, EMI group La Voix de Son maître,) OCLC 9661206
- Alexandre Tansman, Works for 2 pianos - Diane Andersen & Daniel Blumenthal, piano; (1997, format CD, Arcobaleno Records - Belgium ) OCLC 1051576750
- Adolphe Biarent, Piano Quintet in B minor; Cello Sonata in F♯ minor - Diane Andersen, piano; Danel quartet; Mark Drobinsky, cello, (2002, Cypres) OCLC 50742994
- Joseph Jongen, The complete piano works Vol. 1 - Diane Andersen, piano; (2002, format CD, Pavane records - Brussels) OCLC 52584156
- Joseph Jongen, The complete piano works Vol. 2 - Diane Andersen, piano; André de Groote, interpreter (2005, format CD, Pavane records - Brussels) OCLC 62794213
- Joseph Jongen, Piano quartet op. 23 Trio for piano, violin and viola, op. 30 - Ensemble Joseph Jongen : Diane Andersen, piano; Eliot Lawson, violin; Jacques Dupriez, viola; Mark Drobinsky, cello (2003, format CD, Cyprès records - Brussels ) OCLC 520892180
- Joseph Jongen, JONGEN, J.: Piano Music (Complete), Vol. 1 (Andersen). - Diane Andersen, piano; (2005, format Emusic, Naxos (label)|Hong Kong : Naxos Digital Services US Inc) OCLC 885055223
- Joseph Jongen, JONGEN, J.: Piano Music (Complete), Vol. 2 (Andersen). - Diane Andersen, piano; (2005, format Emusic, Naxos (label)|Hong Kong : Naxos Digital Services US Inc) OCLC 885062645
- Vincent d'Indy, Poème des montagnes; symphonic poem for piano op. 15; Sonata in E major; op. 63 - Diane Andersen, piano; (2008, Talent records) OCLC 718444683
- Dianne Goolkasian Rahbee, Piano Concerto Op. 134; Sonata No. 4 Op. 128 - Diane Andersen, piano; David Alexander Rahbee, conductor & le Matav Hungarian Symphony Orchestra; (2006, Recital Company Productions records)
- Claude Delvincourt, The piano work, volume 1 - Croquembouches - Five pieces for piano - Unpublished early works - Diane Andersen, piano; ( 2017, Azur Classical records) OCLC 1005722657
- Claude Delvincourt, L'œuvre pour violon et piano - Diane Andersen, piano; Eliot Lawson, violon.
