= Antoine Louis Moeldner =

Antoine Louis Moeldner Jr. (December 12, 1891 – January 31, 1965) was an American pianist and piano teacher who worked in Boston, Massachusetts.

== Biography ==
Moeldner was born in Boston to a father of German descent from Saint-Louis, Haut-Rhin, Alsace. He attended Volkmann School in Boston and graduated from Harvard College in 1913. He studied piano with Helen Hopekirk and Ignacy Jan Paderewski. One of his best-known students is Dianne Goolkasian Rahbee, who is an internationally known pianist and composer.
