= Semen Klymovsky =

Ukrainian Cossack and poet

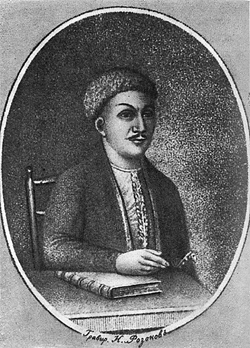
- Born: 1705 unknown, Left-bank Ukraine
- Died: 1785 (aged 79–80); Pryputni (today Moshoryne), Kherson Governorate, Russian Empire
- Education: Kyiv-Mohyla Academy
- Occupation: poet
- Writing career
- Language: Ukrainian

Semen Klymovsky (Klymiv) (Ukrainian: Семен Климовський (Климів); 1705 – 1785) was a Ukrainian Cossack, philosopher and poet from the Kharkiv Regiment. Popular tradition attributes to him the authorship of the famous Ukrainian folk song "Ikhav Kozak za Dunaj".

== Biography ==
His exact birthplace is unknown. He was connected with the Kyiv-Mohyla Academy. His poetical works testify to his knowledge of languages, literature and philosophy. Among those whose views were closest to Klymovsky, Horace should be mentioned first of all.

All his life since 1724 he participated in military campaigns of the Ukrainian Cossacks, and inspired by them he wrote poems and songs. At the end of the 18th century on the territory of the former Zaporozhian Sich, together with a friend he founded the village of Pryputni, where he died.

Pryputni was abandoned as a result of the Holodomor and its territory was annexed to Moshoryne.

== Works ==
In 1724 Klymovsky presented tsar Peter I with two didactic poems named On justice (О правосудію...) and On humility (О смиренії...).

== Legacy ==
Klymovsky became the hero of prince Alexander Shakhovskoy's play comedy Cossack Versemaker (Russian: Казак-стихотворец), which contributed to the emergence of dramatic works by Ivan Kotliarevsky. His own works were published in 1905 by Vyacheslav Sreznevsky.
