= Aleksandra Mikulska =

Polish pianist

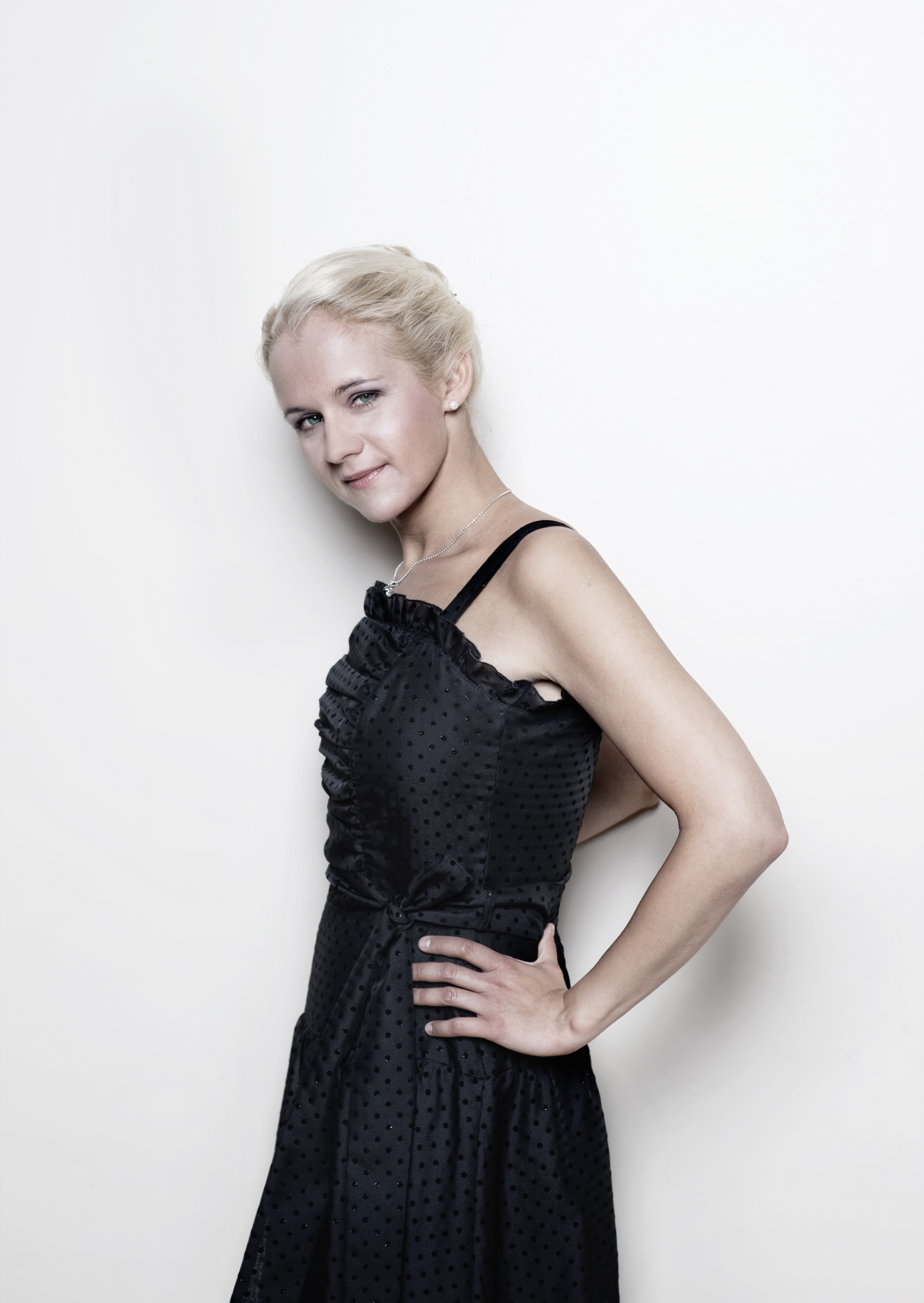

Background information
- Born: 17 November 1981 (age 45); Warsaw, Poland
- Genre: Classical
- Occupation: Pianist
- Instrument: Piano
- Website: aleksandramikulska.com

Aleksandra Mikulska (born 17 November 1981 in Warsaw, Poland) is a Polish classical pianist. She is the current president of the Chopin Society in Darmstadt, Germany.

== Biography ==
Mikulska was born in Warsaw. She began piano education at the age of six. She attended a class for young talent at the Karol Szymanowski Complex of State Music Schools in Warsaw. Mikulska went on to study with Peter Eicher at the Hochschule für Musik in Karlsruhe. She subsequently continued her studies at the Accademia Pianistica Internazionale “Incontri col Maestro” di Imola in Italy, where she was influenced by Lazar Berman, Boris Petrushansky and Michel Dalberto. After completing the studies, Mikulska enrolled in Arie Vardi’s postgraduate solo performance class at the Hochschule für Musik, Theater und Medien Hannover, where she received her Performer's Diploma in 2010. She attended numerous master classes taught by well-known piano teachers including Lev Natochenny, Andrzej Jasiński, Kevin Kenner and Diane Andersen, among others.

She was awarded several times a Polish prime ministerial bursary and a scholarship by the Alfred Toepfer Stiftung F.V.S. Her debut recording was released in 2010 and is dedicated to works by Frédéric Chopin.

Mikulska has performed with renowned orchestras under the batons of Michael Sanderling, Pawel Przytocki, Kaspar Zehnder, Johannes Schlaefli, Stefan Fraas and Philippe Bach at the Musikverein in Vienna, the Brucknerhaus in Linz, the Tonhalle Zürich, the Saalbau Essen, the Nikolaisaal in Potsdam, the Kurhaus Wiesbaden, the Künstlerhaus in Munich and the National Philharmonic in Warsaw.

Mikulska was awarded with many prizes at international piano competitions, among others the prize for The best Polish female pianist at the 15th International Chopin Piano Competition in Warsaw.

Mikulska was appointed to a professorship at the Hochschule für Musik Carl Maria von Weber in Dresden starting in the winter semester 2021/2022.

== Selected discography ==
- 2010: Frédéric Chopin: Sonata in B Minor
- 2011: Expressions: Piano Works by Joseph Haydn, Karol Szymanowski and Frédéric Chopin
- 2013: Frédéric Chopin: Ballades
- 2015: European Melodies: Aleksandra Mikulska plays Chopin & Franz Liszt
- 2018: Souvenirs: Piano Works by Franz Liszt
- 2020: Reflections: Piano Sonatas by Frédéric Chopin and Franz Liszt

== Awards ==
- 2000: Second prize in the Concorso Internazionale di Pianoforte “E. Porrino” in Cagliari, Italy.
- 2005: Special prize for The best Polish female pianist at the 15th International Chopin Piano Competition in Warsaw, Poland.
- 2007: Second and audience prize at the Musica Aeterna International Piano Competition in Wavre, Belgium.
