= Zbigniew Mikulski =

Polish philatelist

Zbigniew Mikulski (30 April 1925 – 28 December 2017) was a Polish and Swiss philatelist who was appointed to the Roll of Distinguished Philatelists in 2002. He specialised in the philately of Russia and Poland. His display of Russia won the Grand Prix International at Praha '88, and his collection of Soviet Airmails won the Grand Prix at Luraba '81. His display of Poland won Large Gold Medals at Praha '88 and Philexfrance'89.

In addition to stamps Mikulski also collected Polish artworks and over the years acquired over hundred artworks of some of the best known Polish artist. Part of his collection was exhibited in Art Centre of Bydgoszcz (Polish: Bydgoskie Centrum Sztuki) in 2019.
