= Dianne Goolkasian Rahbee =

American classical composer

Dianne Goolkasian Rahbee (born February 9, 1938) is an Armenian-American contemporary classical composer and pedagogue.

== Biography ==
Rahbee was born in Somerville, Massachusetts and raised in Waltham, Massachusetts. Her father, Peter Aharon Goolkasian, was a survivor of the 1915 Armenian genocide.

Rahbee began her early musical training as a pianist with Antoine Louis Moeldner, and continued study at Juilliard School as a piano major. She continued her work at the Mozarteum University of Salzburg in Salzburg, Austria. She later studied piano with David Saperton in New York and Lily Dumont, Russell Sherman, and Veronica Jochum in Boston.

At age 40, Rahbee began concentrating on composing and produced a large body of works. Her music has been described as "postserial in persuasion", and marries influences of Armenian folk music, neo-tonal musicality and rhythmic drive. Maurice Hinson in Guide To The Pianist’s Repertoire commented that Goolkasian-Rahbee's pedagogical works for piano are among the finest such works.

Rahbee traces her lineage of piano study directly to Ludwig van Beethoven through Antoine Louis Moeldner. Moeldner studied with Helen Hopekirk and Ignacy Jan Paderewski, who both studied with Theodor Leschetizky. Leschetizky in turn studied with Carl Czerny, who studied with Beethoven himself.

Rahbee lives in Belmont, Massachusetts where she has taught private piano lessons for many years.

== Works ==
=== Piano ===
- Phantasie-Variations Op. 12 (1980)
- Three Preludes Op. 5 (1980)
- Abstracts Op. 7 (1981)
- Intermezzo Op. 18, No. 3 (1983)
- Soliloquies Op. 17 (1983)
- Intermezzo Op. 21, No. 2 (1984)
- Sonata No. 1 Op. 25 (1986)
- Sonata No. 2 Op. 31 (1988)
- Sketch Op. 29 "Harp" (1988)
- Scherzino Op. 32, No. 2 (1989)
- Nocturne Op. 32, No. 1 (1989)
- Novellette Op. 37 (1990)
- Sonatina Op. 41 (1990)
- "Intchu" Op. 54 (1992)
- "Whim" Op. 62 (1994)
- Three Preludes Op. 68 (1994)
- "Twilight" Op. 69 (1995)
- Sonata No. 3 Op. 83 "Odyssey" (1997)
- Three Preludes Op. 87 (1998)
- Three Preludes Op. 88-90 (1998)
- Prelude Op. 94 "Daydream" for Igor Kipnis (1999)
- Phantasie Op. 99 "Y2K" (2000)
- Homage to Shostakovich Op. 106 (2000)
- Ballade Op. 111 (2001)
- Three Preludes Op. 120 "Le retour"; "Ensemble"; "Au revoir" (2002)
- Prelude Op. 122 "Rendezvous" (2002)
- Prelude Op. 123 "Hommage a Ligeti" (2002)
- Two Preludes Op. 125 "Contemplation"; "Rejoicing" (2002)
- Tango Op. 126 (2002) for Diane Andersen
- Sonata No. 4 Op. 128 (2002) for Diane Andersen
- Ballade No. 2 Op. 129 (2002) "Nine Eleven WTC Flashbacks"
- Carousel Op. 131 (2003)
- Monday Morning In The City Op. 132 (2003)
- Adventurous Journey Op. 133 (2003)
- Two Preludes for Mildred Freiberg Op. 138 (2004) "Escape to Inner Space"; "A Vibrant Spirit"
- Two Preludes Op. 140 (2004) "Champagne petillant"; "Imploration"
- Two Bagatelles Op. 142 (2005)
- Finger March Op. 143 (2005) parade for four players (each plays single line)
- "Mystère" Op. 161 (2008)
- Bagatelle Op. 163 (2008)
- "Reflections" Sorrows and Joys Op. 164 (2008)
- "French Suite" Op. 165 (2008)
  - A Field of Happy Sunflowers "Zone d’heureux Tournesois" for Eric Hénon
  - Motorcycling Through the Beautiful French Country-side “motocyclisme par la campagne francaise” for Nadine Delsaux
  - “Chateau de Saint Senoch”
- "Three Close Friends" Op. 182 (2009) trio for three people on one piano

=== Piano (pedagogical) ===
- Essay No. 1 (1972)
- Tarantella (duet) Op. 2 (1972)
- Pictures Op. 3 (1980)
- Five Toccatinas (from Essays Op. 4) (1980)
- Expressions Op. 8 (1981)
- Fragments Op. 14 (1987)
- Seven Little Etudes Op. 74 (1996)
- Seven Small Pieces Op. 105 (2000)
- Children's Album (seven pieces) Op. 107 (2000)
- Teaching Pieces for FJH Collection Op. 146 (2006)
  - No. 1 "Sad Story"
  - No. 2 "Fooling Around" for Ariella Salehrabi
  - No. 3 "Armenian Saga" for Stephanie DerAnanian
  - No. 4 "Folk Dance" for Sylvie LeBoeuf
  - No. 5 "Jumping Traiads" for Lorenzo Palombi
  - No. 6 "The Wild Chase" for Iman and Nora Morlot
  - No. 7 "Tricky Triads" for Silvie Lehrer LeBoeuf
- Eastern Tales Op. 144 (2005)
  - No. 1 Journey To Where
  - No. 2 Little Folk Dance
  - No. 3 Georgian Saga
  - No. 4 Through the Desert
- Etude in Seconds Op. 149 No. 1 (2006)
- Marathon Race Op. 149 No. 2 (2006)
- Twirling Round and Round Op. 149 No. 3 (2006)
- "Brain Teaser" Octave Displacement Op. 162 (2008)

=== Two pianos ===
- 10+10 Op. 48 (1991)
- "Mosaic" Op. 26 (1992)
- Three Preludes Op. 68a (1994)
- Little Suite Op. 72 (1995)
- Triptych Op. 114 (2001)
- Rhapsodie Op. 80a "Urartu" (2001)
- Toccata for Two Pianos Op. 118 (2002)
- Tango Op. 126a (2002) for Diane Andersen
- "Anahid's Musings" Op. 147 (2006) for 2 pianos and percussion
- "Odyssey" Op. 148 (2006) for 2 pianos

=== Piano and orchestra ===
- Rhapsodie Op. 80 "Urartu" 2 piano arr. (1996)
- Concertino Op. 87 2 piano arr. (1997)
- Concerto No. 1 Op. 104 2 piano arr. (2000)
- Concertino No. 2 Op. 113 (2001) with strings and percussion
- Piano Concerto Op. 134 (2003) for Diane Andersen
- Concertino No. 3 Op. 145 (2005) for piano and strings (and opt. percussion)

=== Organ ===
- Rondo Op. 33 (1989)
- Pastorale for Organ and Recorder Op. 71 (1996)
- Three Bagatelles Op. 42 for Organ and Recorder (1997)

=== Harpsichord ===
- Sonatina Op. 41 (1990)
- Two Pieces for Harpsichord and Recorder (Allegretto; Pastorale) Op. 77 (1996)

=== Violin ===
- Solo Violin "Soliloquies" Op. 22 (1983)
- Sonata Breve Op. 50 (1992)

=== Violin and piano ===
- Five Bagatelles Op. 42a (1991)
- Three Reflections Op. 47a (1991)
- Pastorale Op. 71 (1995)
- Four Selected Preludes Op. 92 (1999)
- "A Khodja Tale" Op. 98 (1999) (elementary)
- "Feu Follet" Op. 151b (2007) arr. for violin and piano, poem by Therese Planiol
- "Ses Yeux" Op. 152b (2007) arr. for violin and piano, poem by Therese Planiol
- Prelude "Romance" Op. 154b (2007) arr. for violin and piano (from Op. 120 No. 2)
- Sonata No. 2 Op. 157 (2007) for violin and piano (arr. Piano Sonata No. 2 Op. 31)

=== Viola ===
- "Discourse" Op. 20 (1984)
- "Sonata Breve" Op. 50 with piano (1994)
- Rhapsodie Op. 81 for viola and orchestra (1997)
- "A Khodja Tale” Op. 98 (1999) (elementary)

=== Cello ===
- "Vicissitudes" Second Millennium Op. 97 (1999)

=== Ensemble ===
==== Trios ====
- Trio "Shir Ahaba" Op. 28 (1986) for flute, viola and cello
- Suite Op. 45 No. 1-8 (1991) for piano, violin and cello or winds
- Trio Op. 63 viola, cello and piano (1994)
- "Vicissitudes" Second Millennium Op. 97a (1999) for violin, cello and piano
- "Vicissitudes" Second Millennium Op. 97b (1999) for clarinet, cello and piano
- Wedding March Op. 135 (2003) for piano, violin and cello

==== String quartet ====
- Improvisation Op. 6 (1973)
- "Pages from my Diary" Op. 19 (1983)
- String Quartet Op. 57 "Keff" (1992)
- String Quartet Op. 58 "Journey's End" (1993)

==== String quintet ====
- "Journey’s End" Op. 58 (String Quartet & Double Bass)

==== Sextet ====
- "Seeds of Friendship" Op. 111 No. 1, 2 flutes and strings (2001)
- "A Short Burst of Energy" Op. 111 No. 2, 2 flutes and strings (2001)

==== Orchestra ====
- Symphony No. 1 "Kiss of Peace" Op. 38 (1990) (2-2-3-2, 4-2-2-1, timp., perc., str.)
- Elegy Op. 39 (1990) string orchestra
- Tapestries Op. 49 (1991)
  - No. 1 "Proclamation" (2-2-2-2, 4-1-3, timp., perc., str.)
  - No. 2 (2-2-3-2, 4-2-3, timp., perc., str.)
  - No. 3 (2 (pic)-2-3-2, 4-2-2-1, timp., perc., str.)
  - No. 5 (2-2-2-2, 4-2-2, timp., perc., str.)
- Tone Poem Op. 55 "Sevan" (1992) (2 (picc.)-2-2-2, 4-2-2, timp., perc., str.)
- Three Statements (1993)
  - No. 1 "Keff" Op. 57a
  - No. 2 "Journey's End" Op. 58
  - No. 3 "Essay" Op. 59 (Strings and percussion)
- "Journey’s End" Op. 58a (full orchestra) (1995)
- Concerto Op. 156 for Mimi Stillman (2007) for flute and orchestra
- Concerto Op. 158 (2007) for violin and orchestra (arr. Concerto Op. 156)

==== Student orchestra ====
- Belmont Suite for Orchestra Op. 86 (1998)
- “Keff” Student Orchestral Ensemble Op. 117 (2001)

==== Concert band ====
- Tapestry No. 3 Op. 49a "Satire" (1992)

=== Mandoline ===
- Bagatelle Op. 27 No. 1 solo (1986)
- "Ariunas" Duo Op. 27 No. 2 mandoline and guitar (1986)

=== Recorder ensembles ===
- Bagatelles Op. 75 for Recorder Trios (1996)
  - "Andantino” (descant, treble, bass)
  - "Allegretto” (treble, tenor, bass)
  - "Barcarolle” (treble, tenor, bass)
  - "Giocoso” (treble, tenor, bass)
  - "Gioviale” (treble, tenor, bass)
  - "Spasso” (treble, tenor, tenor)
- "Pastorale" Op. 71 for Recorder Quartet (descant, treble, tenor, bass) (1996)
- "Giocoso" Op. 75 No. 4 for Recorder Quartet (descant, treble, tenor, bass) (1996)
- "Pastorale" Op. 71 for Recorder Quintet (descant, treble, tenor 1-2, bass) (1996)

=== Flute ===
- Duo Op. 30 (1989)
- Duo Op. 32 (1989)
- Five Bagatelles Op. 42 (1991)
- Flute Trio Op. 18 No. 1 (1991)
- Celebration Op. 56 (1993)
- Two Dialogues Op. 70 flute and viola (1995)
- Pastorale Op. 71 flute and harp (1995)
- Flute Frolic Op. 18 No. 1, flute and piano (1995)
- "Feu Follet" Op. 151a (2007) arr. for flute and piano, poem by Therese Planiol
- "Ses Yeux" Op. 152a (2007) arr. for flute and piano, poem by Therese Planiol
- Prelude "Romance" (from Sonata No. 4) Op. 154 (2007) for flute & piano
- Sonata Op. 155 (2007) for flute and piano

=== Winds ===
- Wind Quartet "Three Fragments" Op. 13 (1981) for flute, oboe, clarinet, and bassoon
- Duo Op. 30 (1989) for 2 flutes, 2 oboes and 2 clarinets
- Duo Op. 32 (1989) for 2 flutes
- Monologue Op. 35 (1989) for flute, oboe or clarinet
- Five Bagatelles Op. 42 (1991)
- Three Reflections Op. 42 (1991) for oboe (or English horn) and piano
- Sonata Op. 139 (2004) for clarinet and piano
- "Mischievous Melange" Op. 150 (2006) 5 flutes, 1 horn, 2 pianos, marimba, 1 viola, 3 cellos
- "Feu Follet" Op. 151c (2007) for oboe and piano, poem by Therese Planiol
- "Ses Yeux" Op. 152c (2007) for oboe and piano, poem by Therese Planiol

=== Brass ===
- Trumpet Fanfare Op. 34 (1987) for 2 or more trumpets
- Trumpet Fanfare Op. 63 (1994) for 4 trumpets
- Brass Ensemble Op. 63a (1994) 2 trumpets, torn, trombone, euphonium, tuba and 3 timpani
- Pastorale Op. 71 (1996) for French horn & piano
- Two Fanfares Op. 91 (1999) for brass quintet
- Fanfare Op. 102 (2000) for brass sextet
- Fanfare Op. 112 (2001) for 3 trumpets and French horn
- Fanfare Op. 119 (2002) for 3 trumpets, 2 horns, trombone and baritone
- Sonata for Trumpet and Piano Op. 127 (2002)
- Fanfare for 25th Anniversary of The Rivers School Op. 130 (2003) 4 trumpets, French horn and trombone
- Fanfare Op. 137 (2004) for brass ensemble
- Fanfare Op. 141 (2005) 2 trumpets, 2 horns, 2 euphoniums
- Meditation Op. 159 (2007) for trombone and piano

=== Percussion ===
- Dance Toccata Op. 43 (1991) for marimba (or vibraphone) and piano
- "Tapa" Op. 44 (1991) for two vibraphones
- "Coalescence" and "Arabesque" Op. 46 (1991) for vibraphone and marimba (3 players)
- "Keff" Op. 52 (1993) for vibraphone, xylophone, glockenspiel, 6 tom toms, woodblock, snare, cymbals and 4 Timpani
- "Gadak" Op. 60 (1993) for ensemble
- "High Time" Op. 61 (1993) for ensemble
- Eight Little Etudes (Suite for Marimba) Op. 95 (1999)
- Toccatina for Marimba and Clarinet Op. 121 (2002)

=== Voice ===
- Song Poems Op.23 (1985) for mezzo-soprano (contralto) and piano, poems by Avedick Issahakian (1891–1957)
- “Like a Rock I Stand Resolute” Op. 114 for bass baritone and piano (translated by E.B. Chrakian)
- One Act Opera Op. 24 Mini Musical Drama (1986) "Did I Tell You What Happened During Our Visit To New York Last Spring?"
- Song of Grief Op. 101 (2000)
- "Robbery" (Break In) A Musical Drama In One Act (1993) for mezzo-soprano and piano, words and poetry by Diana DerHovanessian
- "The Telephone" A Musical Drama In One Act (1994) Mezzo Soprano & piano, words and poetry by Diana DerHovanessian
- "Album", A Musical Drama In One Act for mezzo-soprano and piano, words and poetry by Diana DerHovanessian
- "Praise GOD" Op. 85 (1998) for eight voices
- "Hairenikis" (Armenian Anthem) Op. 40 (1990) for chorus and orchestra; also, for chorus and organ
- Two Song Poems Op. 136 (2003) for mezzo-soprano, viola and piano
- "Feu Follet" Op. 151 (2007) soprano and piano, poem by Therese Planiol
- "Ses Yeux" Op. 152 (2007) soprano and piano, poem by Therese Planiol
- "Infini" Op. 160 (2008) for tenor and piano, poem by Andree Brunin
