= Lyubo, bratsy, lyubo =

Russian and Cossack traditional song

"Любо, братцы, любо"

Song
- Language: Russian
- English title: "Lovely, Brothers, Lovely"
- Genre: Folk
- Songwriter: Traditional

"Lovely, Brothers, Lovely" (Note: Russian: Любо, братцы, любо, romanized: Lyúbo, brátcy, lyúbo, IPA: [ˈlʲubə | ˈbratsːɨ | ˈlʲubə]) (Note: Its name is derived from the first row of the refrain Любо, братцы, любо, любо, братцы, жить ("'Tis lovely, brothers, lovely, lovely to live, brothers").) is a Russian and Cossack traditional song. The song became popular after the release of the Soviet film Alexander Parkhomenko (1942) where it was performed by Boris Chirkov.

== Synopsis ==
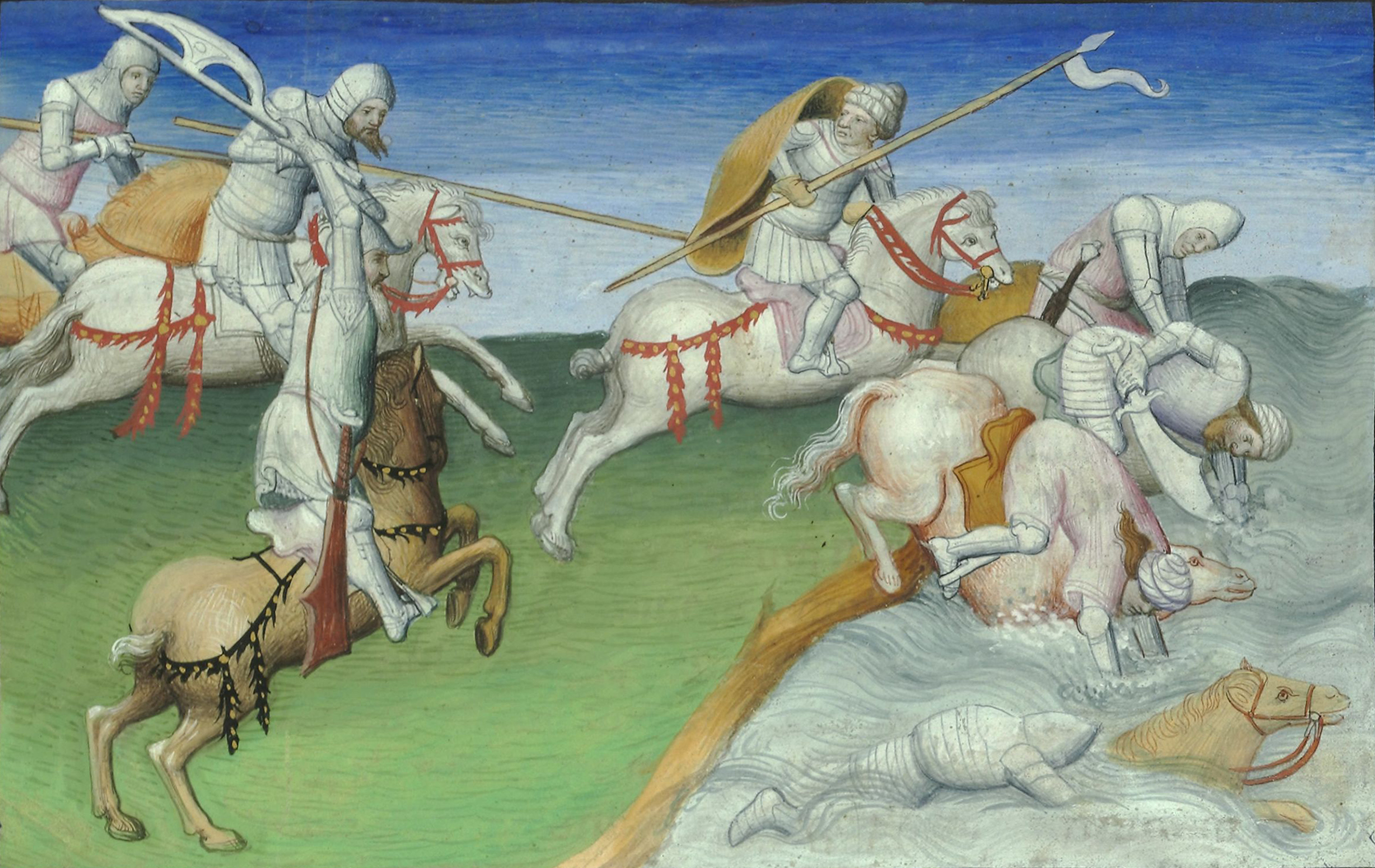
Battle of the Terek River (1262)

The Cossacks (in some versions: Tatars, etc.) led 40,000 horses to the Terek River. After the bloody battle, one bank of the Terek is covered by the dead men and animals. The fatally wounded hero remembers about his wife, his mother, and his steed. Feeling sorrow for the two latter, he mourns his fate.

== Historical background ==
The phrase "Lyubo, bratsy, zhit'" (Russian: Любо, братцы, жить) appeared in a soldier song published in Biblioteka Dlya Chteniya, 1837.

According to several authors, the song is dedicated to the events of the Russian Civil War (1917 – 1922). Other sources mention it as a piece of Cossack folklore.

The song became extremely popular after the release of the Soviet film Alexander Parkhomenko (1942) where it was performed by Boris Chirkov. In 1942 – 1943, a tankers adaptation was created, based on the Chirkov's version.

== Performance ==
The song was popularized by such well-known Russian and Soviet artists as the Kuban Cossack Choir, Zhanna Bichevskaya, Pelageya, etc.

== Words ==
Russian

Как на быстрый Терек, на широкий берег
Вывели казаки сорок тысяч лошадей,
И покрылся берег, и покрылся берег
Сотнями порубленных, пострелянных людей.

Любо, братцы, любо, любо, братцы, жить,
С нашим атаманом не приходится тужить...
Любо, братцы, любо, любо, братцы, жить,
С нашим атаманом не приходится тужить...

А первая пуля, а первая пуля,
А первая пуля, братцы, ранила коня.
А вторая пуля, а вторая пуля,
А вторая пуля, братцы, ранила меня.

Любо, братцы, любо, любо, братцы, жить,
С нашим атаманом не приходится тужить...
Любо, братцы, любо, любо, братцы, жить,
С нашим атаманом не приходится тужить...

А жена заплачет, выйдет за другого,
Выйдет за другого, позабудет про меня…
Жалко только волюшку во широком полюшке,
Жалко мать-старушку да буланого коня.

Любо, братцы, любо, любо, братцы, жить,
С нашим атаманом не приходится тужить...
Любо, братцы, любо, любо, братцы, жить,
С нашим атаманом не приходится тужить...

Кудри мои русые, очи мои светлые,
Травами, бурьяном да полынью зарастут.
Кости мои белые, сердце мое смелое
Коршуны да вороны по степи разнесут.

Любо, братцы, любо, любо, братцы, жить,
С нашим атаманом не приходится тужить...
Любо, братцы, любо, любо, братцы, жить,
С нашим атаманом не приходится тужить...

Poetic translation

Thousands of Cossacks, thousands of brothers
Led to Terek thousands and thousands of steeds.
And the bank was covered with the fallen brothers,
And the bloody bodies made the river waters flee.

Love it, brothers, love it, love to fight and live,
Having such an ataman, you cannot ever grieve!
Love it, brothers, love it, love to fight and live,
Having such an ataman, you cannot ever grieve!

Now the first bullet, now the first bullet,
Now the first bullet, brothers, wounded my steed.
And the second bullet, and the second bullet,
And the second bullet in a twinkle found me...

Love it, brothers, love it, love to fight and live,
Having such an ataman, you cannot ever grieve!
Love it, brothers, love it, love to fight and live,
Having such an ataman, you cannot ever grieve!

And the wife will hear, will shed not many tears,
She will wed again, she will forget about me,
Pity for my wild will, for my silent wide field,
Pity for my mother, for my stray cream-coloured steed!

Love it, brothers, love it, love to fight and live,
Having such an ataman, you cannot ever grieve!
Love it, brothers, love it, love to fight and live,
Having such an ataman, you cannot ever grieve!

Ah, my curls that are so light and my eyes that are so grey,
Soon they will be overgrown by the grass and webs,
While my heart that is so brave and my bones that are so pale
Will be scattered by the ravens over the steppes...

Love it, brothers, love it, love to fight and live,
Having such an ataman, you cannot ever grieve!
Love it, brothers, love it, love to fight and live,
Having such an ataman, you cannot ever grieve!
