= Yikhav Kozak za Dunai =

1790 Ukrainian folk song

"Їхав Козак за Дунай"
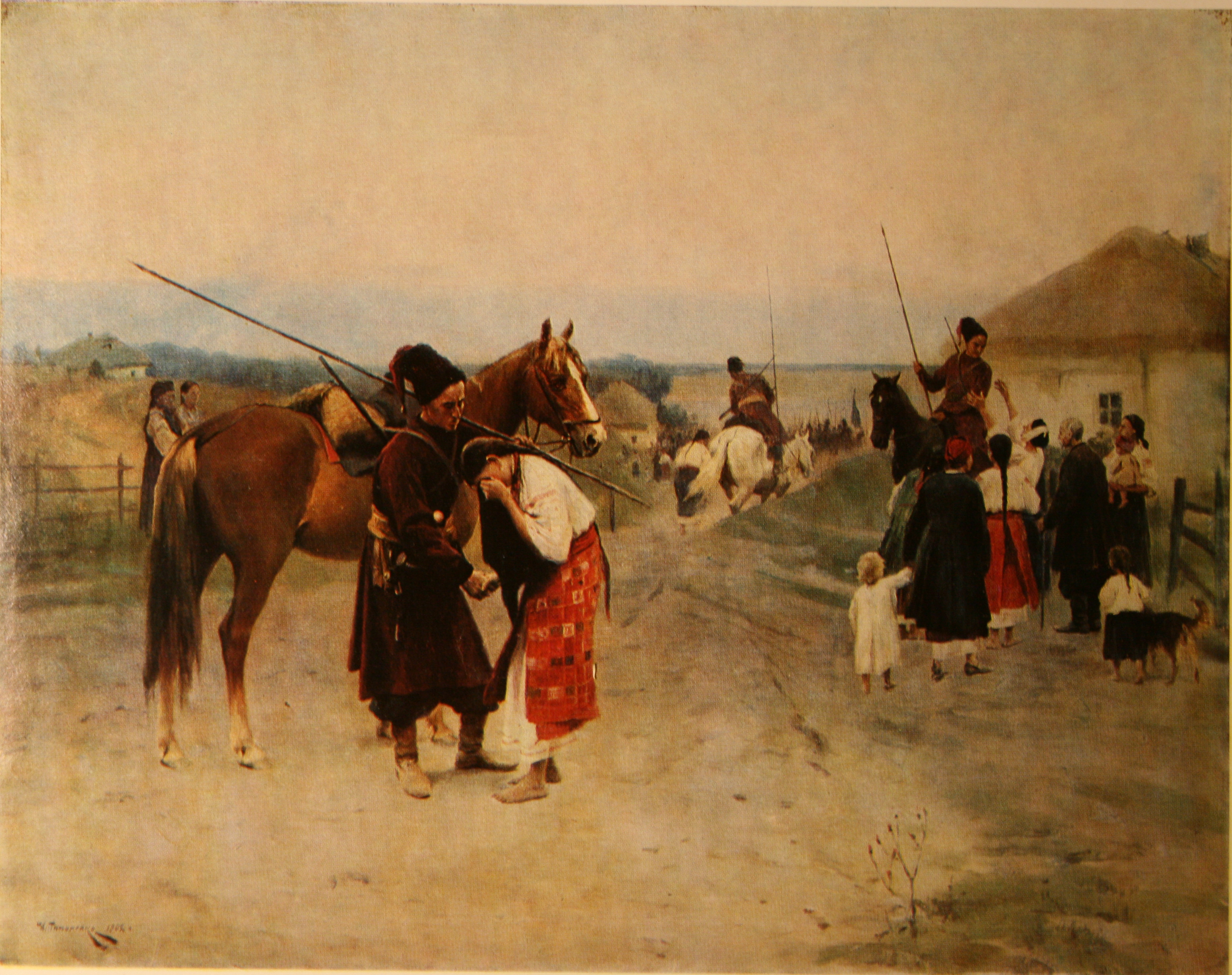
- To War! (1902), by Mykola Pymonenko

Song
- Language: Ukrainian
- English title: "The Cossack Rode beyond the Danube"
- Published: 1790
- Genre: Romance, folk
- Songwriter: Semen Klymovsky

"Yikhav Kozak za Dunai" (Ukrainian: Їхав козак за Дунай, lit. 'The Cossack Rode beyond the Danube') is a Ukrainian folk song. It was written by the Ukrainian philosopher and poet Semen Klymovsky.

Under the name "Schöne Minka" it also became popular in Germany. The German title comes from the first words of a poem by Christoph August Tiedge, "Schöne Minka, ich muß scheiden".

== History ==
The song was first published in Saint Petersburg in 1790 and became popular both in the Russian Empire and in Western Europe, where it was translated into French and German. In 1827 Mykhailo Maksymovych published the song in his collection, adding a sixth stanza.

== Use in compositions ==
- Ferdinand Ries: Variations in A minor on a Cossak Song, Op. 33/2. 1810
- Franciszek Lessel: "Jichaw Kozak z za Dunaju", Eight Variations in A minor on a Russian Theme for piano, Op. 15. 1814
- Ludwig van Beethoven: "Schöne Minka, ich muss scheiden!", Lieder verschiedener Völker (Songs of Various Nations), no. 16. 1816
- Ludwig van Beethoven: "Schöne Minka", Ten National Airs with Variations for Flute and Piano, Op. 107, no. 7. 1818–19
- Anton Eberl: Variations sur un thème russe (for cello and piano), Op. 17
- Vincenz Schuster: Drei Stücke für Guitarren-Violoncello und Guitarre: II. Moderato
- Sigismund Neukomm: Clarinet Quintet in B-flat major, Op. 8: III. Poco adagio. Thème Russe con variazioni
- Carl Maria von Weber: Nine Variations in C minor on a Russian Theme "Schöne Minka", Op. 40, J. 179 for piano
- Johann Nepomuk Hummel: Adagio, Variations and Rondo in A major, Op. 78 "Schöne Minka" for flute cello and piano
- Franz Liszt: "Ballade d'Ukraine," the first movement of Glanes de Woronince, is a dumka composed based on the folksong.
- Spike Jones recorded a swing version of "Minka" in the 1940s in the United States
- Yury Kazakov and Willard Palmer: Variations on a Ukrainian Theme, Їхав козак за Дунай

== Lyrics ==
Ukrainian original
Їхав козак за Дунай,
сказав: "Дівчино, прощай!
Ти, конику вороненький,
неси та гуляй!"
"Постій, постій мій козаче,
твоя дівчина плаче,
Як ти ж мене покидаєш,
тільки подумай!"
Приспів:
Лучше було б, лучше було б не ходить,
Лучше було б, лучше було б не любить,
Лучше було б, лучше було б та й не знать,
Чим тепер, чим тепер забувать.

Вийшла, руки заломивши
I тяженько заплакавши:
"Як ти ж мене покидаєш,
тільки подумай!"
"Білих ручок не ламай,
ясних очей не стирай,
Мене з війни із славою
к собі ожидай."
Приспів

"Не хочу я нікого,
тільки тебе одного,
Ти здоров будь, мій миленький,
а все пропадай."
Свиснув козак на коня:
"Оставайся здорова!
Як не згину, то вернуся
через три года!"
Приспів

Transcription
Yikhav kozak za Dunai,
skazav: "Divchyno, proshchai!
Ty, konyku voronenkyi,
nesy ta huliai!"
"Postii, postii mii kozache,
tvoiia divchyna plache,
Yak ty zh mene pokydaiesh,
tilky podumai!"
Pryspiv:
Luchshe bulo b, luchshe bulo b ne khodyt,
Luchshe bulo b, luchshe bulo b ne liubyt,
Luchshe bulo b, luchshe bulo b ta i ne znat,
Chym teper, chym teper zabuvat.

Vyishla, ruky zalomyvshy
I tiazhenko zaplakavshy:
"Yak ty zh mene pokydaiesh,
tilky podumai!"
"Bilykh ruchok ne lamai,
yasnykh ochok ne styrai,
Mene z viiny iz slavoiu
k sobi ozhydai."
Pryspiv

"Ne khochu ya nikoho,
tilky tebe odnoho,
Ty zdorov bud, mii mylenkyi,
a vse propadai."
Svysnuv kozak na konia:
"Ostavaisia zdorova!
Yak ne zghynu, to vernusia
cherez try hoda!"
Pryspiv

The Cossack rode over the Danube,
He said: "Farewell, my sweetheart.
You, my black horse,
Lead on and march!"
"Wait, wait, my Cossack,
your girl is crying,
How can you leave me,
Just think about it."
Refrain:
Maybe, maybe it would have been better not to leave,
Maybe, maybe it would have been better not to love,
Maybe, maybe it would have been better to not know her
And now, and now is time to forget.

She came out, covering face with hands in despair,
And with a little cry:
"How can you leave me,
Just think about it."
"Don't cover your face with your white hands,
Don't rub your bright eyes,
Coming from war in glory
I shall meet you again."
Refrain

"I do not want anyone
Except for only you,
Take care, my sweetheart,
nothing else matters."
The Cossack whistled on a horse,
"You must take care!
If I won't die, I will return
In three years' time!"
Refrain

== Schöne Minka ==
German original
Schöne Minka, ich muß scheiden, ach du fühlest nicht die Leiden,
fern auf freudelosen Heiden, fern zu sein von dir!
Finster wird der Tag mir scheinen, einsam werd ich gehn und weinen;
auf den Bergen, in den Hainen ruf ich, Minka, dir.

Nie werd ich von dir mich wenden; mit den Lippen, mit den Händen
werd ich Grüße zu dir senden von entfernten Höhn.
Mancher Mond wird noch vergehen, ehe wir uns wiedersehen;
ach, vernimm mein letztes Flehen: bleib mir treu und schön!

Du, mein Olis, mich verlassen? Meine Wange wird erblassen;
alle Freuden werd ich hassen, die sich freundlich nahn.
Ach, den Nächten und den Tagen werd ich meinen Kummer klagen;
alle Lüfte werd ich fragen, ob sie Olis sahn!

Tief verstummen meine Lieder, meine Augen schlag ich nieder;
aber seh ich dich einst wieder, dann wird's anders sein.
Ob auch all die frischen Farben deiner Jugendblüte starben:
ja, mit Wunden und mit Narben bist du, Süßer mein!

Lovely Minka, I must part, oh you feel not the pains,
far upon a joyless moor, far to be from you!
Grimly the day will appear to me, lonely I become sad and cry;
on the mountains, in the groves call I, Minka, to you.

I will never turn from you; with the lips, with the hands
if I send greetings to you from distant jeering.
Some moon will still pass, before we see again;
oh, hear my last begging: remain to me loyal and nice!

You, my Olis, me leave? My cheek will turn pale;
I will hate all joys, which to myself friendly seem.
Oh to the nights and the days I will complain my grief;
I will ask all winds, whether they have seen you!

Deeply my songs fall silent, my eyes knock down I;
but see I you once again, then it will be different.
Whether also all fresh colors of your youth blossom died:
yes, with wounds and with scars you are, sweet mine!

MIDI rendition (in G minor)
