= Robin Jones (musician) =

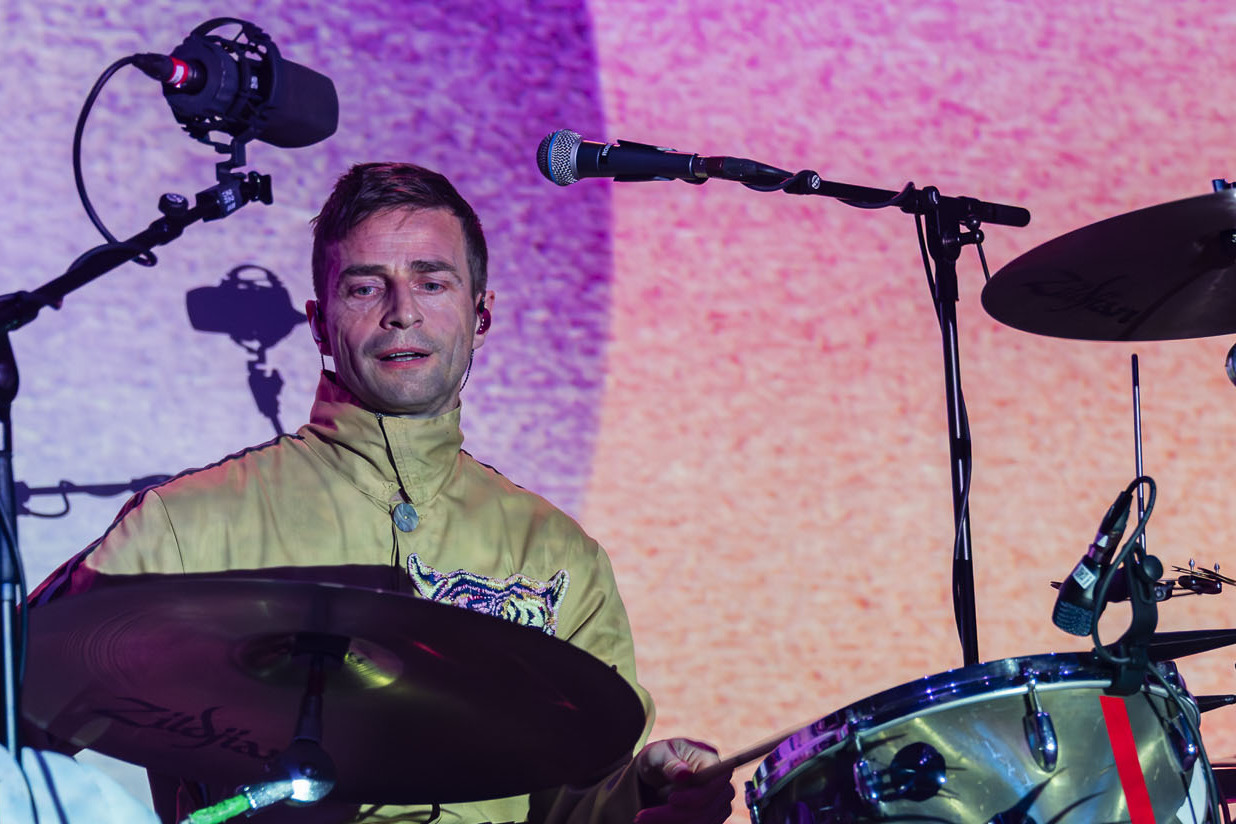
- Jones performing in 2025

Background information
- Born: 26 February 1973 (age 53); Bonnyrigg, Midlothian, Scotland
- Origin: St Andrews, Fife, Scotland
- Genres: Folk; electronic; rock; trip hop; experimental
- Years active: 1996–present
- Member of: The Beta Band; The Aliens

Robin Douglas Jones (born 26 February 1973) is a Scottish musician. Born in Bonnyrigg, Midlothian, he is best known as the drummer of the Beta Band and its spin-off band the Aliens.

== Discography ==
=== The Beta Band ===
==== Extended plays ====
- Champion Versions (1997)
- The Patty Patty Sound (1998)
- Los Amigos del Beta Bandidos (1998)

==== Studio albums ====
- The Beta Band (1999)
- Hot Shots II (2001)
- Heroes to Zeros (2004)

==== Compilation albums ====
- The Three E.P.'s (1998)
- The Best of The Beta Band (CD, 2005)
- The Regal Years (1997–2004) (2013)

=== The Aliens ===
==== Studio albums ====
- Astronomy for Dogs (2007)
- Luna (2008)
- Doorway Amnesia (2021)

==== Extended plays ====
- Alienoid Starmonica (2006)
- The Sunlamp Show EP (2009)
- Electronville (2020)
- Back to Beyond (2021)

==== Live albums ====
- Live on the Moon (2019)
