= John Maclean (film director) =

Scottish film director, screenwriter and musician

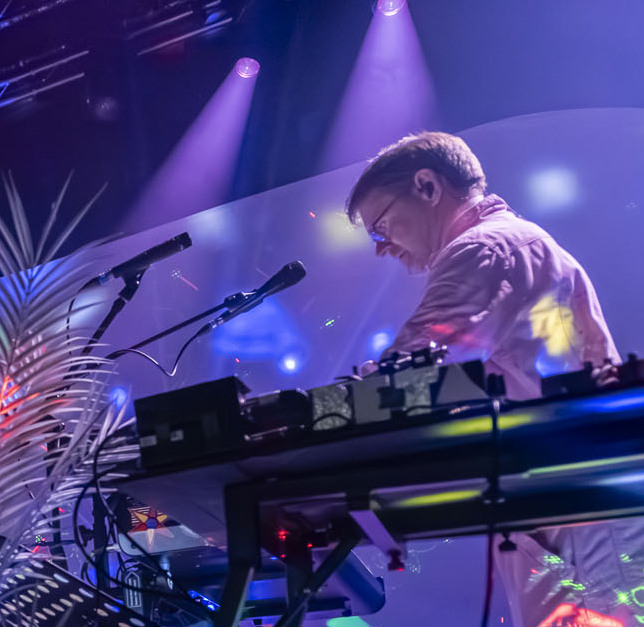
- Maclean performing with the Beta Band, 2025
- Born: 1972 (age 53–54); Perth, Scotland
- Education: Edinburgh College of Art; Royal College of Art
- Occupations: Film director; screenwriter; musician; songwriter; artist
- Years active: 1996–present
- Musical career
- Origin: Tayport, Fife, Scotland
- Genres: Indie rock; post-rock; psychedelia; trip hop
- Instruments: Keyboard; sampler
- Labels: Regal; Because
- Member of: The Beta Band; The Aliens

John Maclean is a Scottish film director, screenwriter, artist and musician. He is best known for writing and directing the films Slow West (2015) and Tornado (2025) and for his work with Scottish musical group the Beta Band.

== Early life and career ==
Maclean was born in 1972 in Perth, Scotland and was brought up in Tayport, near Dundee. He obtained his bachelor's degree (BA) in drawing and painting from Edinburgh College of Art, and his master's degree (MA) from the Royal College of Art in London. After college, he delivered cars by driving them to their new owners around the United States; seeing so much of the country later inspired his interest to make a Western.

Maclean is a founding member of the Scottish indie-rock groups the Beta Band and the Aliens. He has directed music videos for both, as well as for Django Django and KT Tunstall. The Beta Band's videos came to the attention of actor Michael Fassbender, who agreed to a part in Maclean's 2009 short film Man on a Motorcycle; Fassbender would later appear in Maclean's debut feature film, Slow West (2015). The Guardian described the partnership between Maclean and Fassbender as "not quite up there with Scorsese/De Niro yet, but a good start".

Maclean is the son of Scottish artists Marian Leven and Will Maclean. His brother, David Maclean, is the drummer of art rock band Django Django.

== Discography ==
=== The Beta Band ===
Studio albums

- The Beta Band (1999)
- Hot Shots II (2001)
- Heroes to Zeros (2004)

Compilation albums

- The Three E.P.'s (1998)
- The Best of The Beta Band (CD, 2005)
- The Regal Years (1997–2004) (2013)

Extended plays

- Champion Versions (1997)
- The Patty Patty Sound (1998)
- Los Amigos del Beta Bandidos (1998)

Singles

- "To You Alone"/"Sequinsizer" (2000)
- "Broke"/"Won" (2001)
- "Human Being" (2001)
- "Squares" (2002)
- "Assessment" (2004)
- "Out-Side" (2004)

Video

- The Best of The Beta Band (DVD, 2005)

=== The Aliens ===
Studio albums

- Astronomy for Dogs (2007)
- Luna (2008)
- Doorway Amnesia (2021)

Live albums

- Live on the Moon (2019)

Extended plays

- Alienoid Starmonica (2006)
- The Sunlamp Show EP (2009)
- Electronville (2020)
- Back to Beyond (2021)

Singles

- "The Happy Song" (2006)
- "Setting Sun" (2007)
- "Robot Man" (2007)
- "Magic Man" (2008)

== Filmography ==
=== Short films ===
Year	Title	Director	Writer
2009	Man on a Motorcycle	Yes	Yes
2011	Pitch Black Heist	Yes	Yes

=== Feature films ===
Year	Title	Director	Writer
2015	Slow West	Yes	Yes
2025	Tornado	Yes	Yes

=== Music videos ===
Year	Title	Artist
2004	"Trouble"	The Beta Band
2007	"Rox"	The Aliens
2007	"Robot Man"	The Aliens
2007	"Magic Man"	The Aliens
2007	"Setting Sun"	The Aliens
2013	"Hand of Man"	Django Django
2013	"Come On Get In"	KT Tunstall
2017	"Tic Tac Toe"	Django Django

== Reception ==
Reviewing Slow West, the Village Voice deemed Maclean a "supremely promising talent".

Maclean won a Best Short Film BAFTA award in 2012 for Pitch Black Heist, which starred Michael Fassbender and Liam Cunningham. His debut feature film was the 2015 western-drama Slow West. He won the "World Cinema Jury Prize: Dramatic" at the 2015 Sundance Film Festival. The same year, BAFTA named him as a "Brit to Watch".
