= The Beta Band (album) =

Studio album by The Beta Band
- Released: 21 June 1999
- Recorded: 1999
- Genres: Alternative pop; experimental pop; psychedelia; experimental
- Length: 62:02
- Labels: Regal; Astralwerks
- Producers: The Beta Band; Chris Allison

The Beta Band chronology
The Three E.P.'s (1998)	The Beta Band (1999)	Hot Shots II (2001)

The Beta Band is the debut studio album by Scottish musical group The Beta Band, released on 21 June 1999 by Regal Records. The album followed the critically acclaimed compilation of their first three EPs titled The Three E.P.'s (1998). With high anticipation for The Beta Band, the band originally planned to record the album in four separate continents, but financial constraints slimmed the recording locations down; however, the album was still recorded in a variety of locations. The band approached creating the songs in a variety of ways, sometimes forming songs from single melodies, sometimes bringing together other strands of music, among other forms.

The album builds upon the experimentation of their EPs, and is often seen as a particularly intricate, experimental and layered album, with a variety of different influences, sound effects, instrumentation and song structures. Based more around beat and rhythm than prior releases, the numerous different styles and influences incorporated into The Beta Band include psychedelia, hip hop and blues. Vocalist Steve Mason described his lyrics as fitting but without narrative interests. The band also recorded an ambient bonus disc of two long compositions, "Happiness and Colour" and "The Hut", but decided not to include the disc in the final release.

Upon its release, the band made their dissatisfaction with the album public, infamously calling it "fucking awful", largely blaming time constraints. Upon its release, it reached number 18 on the UK Albums Chart. Critics were favourable towards the album, although many found the album particularly messy and disappointing after the EPs. In later years however, several critics have found the album to be underrated and have praised its ambitions. In 2018, as part of a reissue campaign of the band's discography, Because Music re-released the album alongside the intended bonus disc.

== Background ==
In 1997 and 1998, Scottish-based The Beta Band recorded their first releases, three EPs, Champion Versions, The Patty Patty Sound and Los Amigos del Beta Bandidos, which were met with high critical acclaim. After they had signed to Regal Records, a subsidiary of EMI's label Parlophone, the three EPs were released together as the album The Three E.P.'s in September 1998, which similarly was met with positive reviews. In 1999, they signed to Astralwerks in the United States and the label subsequently released The Three E.P.'s in the country. According to writer Ted Hedrickson, the band – consisting of multi-instrumentalists Steve Mason, Robin Jones, Richard Greentree and John Maclean – fused musical elements like ambient drones, trip hop beats and Pink Floyd-style introspective balladry to create their unique sound throughout their EPs, and that these releases "served as a fabulous taster for the band's self-titled debut."

By the time of The Beta Band, the group had undergone a successful, quick American tour while having become known in Britain for their live performances. Their gigs typically featured films, a DJ set that they would perform before the show, and quirky on-stage sampling from Maclean. Although anticipation for the band's official debut album was high, Maclean later admitted they were "sure a bit worried about doing an album." They would later tour in the United States in promotion of The Beta Band.

== Writing and recording ==
Each song on the album was approached differently; some songs the band developed from a single idea or melody, while the chords and melodies of others were developed beforehand. Robin Jones stated "We never really had a master plan ... after we did a song, we turned around and tried to do exactly the opposite. The most exciting songs were the ones where we were making something out of nothing." Describing his lyrics for the record, vocalist Steve Mason explained he typically just followed "the rhythms of the songs, more like a percussionist", and mentioned that the songs "don't really tell a story. It's just words that go in there. They mean something, but they don't mean…anything." Despite some critics believing some of the tracks to be pastiches, the band explained to writer Lydia Vanderloo that they were not "really into pastiche or irony or anything", with Maclean commenting, "Everything's very serious and honest, hopefully. We're not so scared that we hide behind the irony that a lot of folks seem to hide behind these days." Mason later explained to Hedrickson about the creation of the songs:

"Each song starts differently, really. Some times it's a sample or a drum beat. Sometimes it's lyrics or a melody or something like that. It's different every time. [...] 'The Hard One' is a good example because we did something in a way we've never tried before. We don't really have songs where its verse and chorus, but the song has two verses and two choruses. Just to make it a bit more interesting we split everything up. We treated each section like a separate song. So the first verse was like one song. The second verse wasn't a copy at all and we tried to treat the choruses that way as well. Then we combined the songs together to make one song."

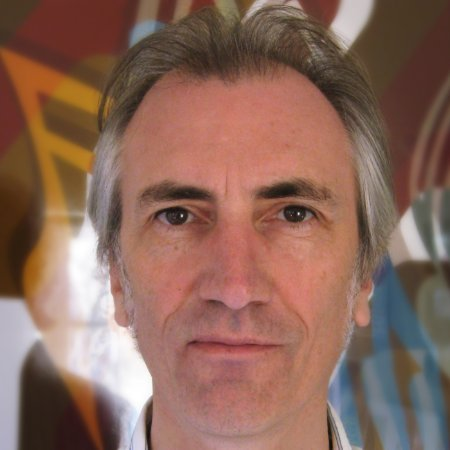
Chris Allison co-produced The Beta Band.

According to Steve Taylor in The A to X of Alternative Music, none of the songs were prepared before the band entered the studio, which is where they were "determined to keep their manual looping techniques". The band's original intention for The Beta Band was for it to be a double album with each side of the LP recorded in a different continent, "one in Tokyo, one in Mexico and so on". The band tried to plan this with their manager and Regal owner Miles Leonard, but ultimately Leonard dismissed the idea as impossible: "it would have cost three-quarters of a million pounds or something and they would have lost the plot."

Instead, according to Spin, the album was at least partly recorded in a small hut belonging to Maclean's grandfather in a remote northwest part of Scotland, where the group found themselves with no room to sleep as they filled the hut with an excessive amount of musical equipment and homemade instruments. Sawmills Studio, Rockfield Studios and Jacobs Studio were also recording locations for the album. In a 1999 interview, Mclean clarified that separate sections of the albums were recorded in different places: "Four songs here, four songs somewhere else. You know, break it up a bit?" As with the band's prior releases, The Beta Band co-produced the album with Chris Allison, who also engineered it, although the band's manager later admitted he felt the collaboration was not as successful this time.

=== Ambient bonus disc ===
In one of their attempts to "make something out of nothing", the band had originally intended the album to contain a bonus disc of two long-form ambient pieces, "Happiness and Colour" and "The Hut", both of which lasted over 20 minutes and represented the band's desire to "make a record of sound as a description for something like happiness, where a distinct first part gives way to a distinct second part". The band's idea to record The Beta Band in Maclean's grandfather's hut was so they could record the sounds of the ocean for these pieces, and during which they discussed the possibility of a quadruple album. After the band returned to London, they had with them several hours of audio that they had recorded, which were then edited down into the two tracks.

According to Craig McLean of Spin, "both sounded a little random, like a radio scanning across the ether". However, the band ultimately decided to remove these tracks from the album. Jones recalled: "We liked some of what we recorded, but it's not really what we wanted it to be from start to finish. We felt the second part was lacking in direction." Nonetheless, this decision came several weeks after the band's record label had already included the ambient disc with promotional copies of the album distributed to various people in the music industry. Drummer Robin Jones felt the reason they dropped the disc was because they were rushed into constructing it in only four days, saying they intended it to be "an ambient… sound-piece. It’s really indulgent on our part, but I wanted to make it a musical story. In the same way Chill Out by The KLF is a story. So it sort of succeeds. It just needed more… conclusions. Rushed again." The bonus disc was eventually released officially alongside special editions of the album's 2018 remaster.

== Composition ==
=== Musical style ===
"The Beta Band swerves crazily from Wagnerian drama ('It's Not So Beautiful') to futurist country-rock ('Broken Up Like a Ding-Dong'), with detours into prog-rock, proto-hip-hop and ambient dub."

— Craig Mclean of Spin.

The Beta Band is an experimental, sonically complex, dense and detailed album. Unlike the band's previous EPs, which presented their varied genre influences in a less coarse way, the album is more abstract and beat-minded, fusing genres more abrasively, whilst being less influenced by folk music. Described by AllMusic's Jason Ankeny as "a brashly schizophrenic freak-out which weaves its way throughout the history of rock & roll," the album crosses a wide variety of musical ground which, in the words of CMJ New Music Monthly, makes it "hard to locate exactly where the foursome are coming from." Ankeny, describing the styles, said: "Pop, blues, folk, psychedelia, hip-hop -- they're all here, sometimes even colliding within the same song; the disc somehow sounds almost completely different with each successive listen, consistently revealing new layers and possibilities.”

The ten songs on the album rely on a snippet of melody, often sung and played on acoustic guitar by Steve Mason, but surrounding his voice are not only guitars or drums but many other, more unusual instruments and techniques, including samples, xylophones, sleigh bells, hand claps, spoons, and a diversity of bird whistles, including a cuckoo, with its songs integrating numerous tape loops and offbeat breakbeats into what writer Ron Hart called the album's "ambient classic rock jams and textured pop melodies". The music is said to disregard melody and other examples of musical theory such as verses and choruses in favour a chaotic approach. Jonathan Perry of Rolling Stone, describing the tracks, said:

"Each track unfolds into panoramic vistas of texture and sound that suggest other ethereal worlds even as the band's approach remains rooted in organic instrumentation like acoustic guitar and percussion and lyrics that often amount to little more than earth-bound mantra-like chants. It's that sense of improvisational freedom within the framework of a specific song that gives the band's material its expansive flair"

As with prior albums, the band's early Pink Floyd influence is prominent throughout The Beta Band, although hip hop is said to be a more prominent influence on this record, with rapping, splicing and samples appearing prominently. Mason hoped, regardless of the "really obvious" criss-cross of styles on "The Beta Band Rap", the band's various influences throughout the rest of The Beta Band would sound "a bit more subtly involved". He also felt the record was both a conscious and natural effort, adding "it's just something we all really wanted to do", while Greentree himself described the album as "like a bird without all the fleshy bits and feathers." Stylus Magazine's Derek Miller called the album a "testimony to balls-out astral tribalism" which features "some of the more singular 'alt-pop music' of the last decade", while doing so "in a veiled manner that never shows its hand until you’re four songs deep and still stuck in thought about the first.”

=== Songs ===
"The Beta Band Rap" opens the album and consists of three distinctive parts, opening with a spirited marching band introduction that segues into a rap section whose lyrics recount the band's history to date in detail, describing the band's formation, signing to Parlophone subsidiary label Regal Records and "drinking champagne at EMI". It was described by writer Stuart Berman as "actually equal parts barbershop-quartet serenade, proto-'Lazy Sunday' faux b-boy braggadocio, and Elvis pelvis thrusts." "It's Not Too Beautiful" follows, starting with pulsating guitars that push "a wished whirlpool sound" and followed by Mason's multitracked vocals. According to one review, "the song seems to take flight on the whirl of a helicopter, with blades blunted and made soft by the dander in the air." "Simple Boy" is a quieter song, backed by atmospheric changes.

"The Beta Band were always headstrong, and here you see them chasing their own tails in wild-eyed delight, summoning all the fires of the forest and the scattered stars in the sky to cast light on their studio jams."

— Derek Miller of Stylus

Described as a country rock ramble, "Round the Bend" is among the more focused songs. Mason's very specific lyrics are displayed as internal monologue as he recalls a disappointing night. He blends simple thoughts about drinking and dinner with travel fantasies about pyramids, opinions on the Beach Boys' Wild Honey and "moments of deep awkwardness". A jam of both organic and electronic elements, "Dance O'er the Border" is heavy on repetition and percussion and lacks a melody for the first four minutes, while featuring lyrics that forgo verses, choruses and rhyming in favour of Mason spoken, stream-of-consciousness comments. Miles Bowe named it the album's best song and the band's fifth best overall, saying that although not "very representative of the Beta Band's sound", it "does a pretty great job" of anticipating LCD Soundsystem.

"Brokenupadingdong" and "Smiling" were compared to Julian Cope by writer Tom Ewing, who described them as "ramshackle campfire clapalong jams with a powerful communal momentum" that partly recall Amon Duul I, Can and late 1980s British house music. Between them is "Number 15", a frustrated song with an emphasis on dance music and unusual choral refrains, alongside gamelan elements played with kitchen utensils. "The Hard One" was partly inspired by Bonnie Tyler's 1983 hit "Total Eclipse of the Heart". The band sampled the piano motif from the song, and "although [they] put it through stuff", they declared it "their cover version"; "We switched the lyrics to the chorus around", Mason told CMJ, "I thought that it was a great song, so we ended up writing a tune around it." Jim Steinman, who wrote and produced "Total Eclipse of the Heart", threatened the band with legal action over using its lyrics, "Once upon a time I was falling in love, now I'm only falling apart", which the band changed slightly so that they became "Once upon a time I was falling apart, now I'm only falling in love", but changed his mind after he heard the song. "The Cow's Wrong" closes the record in a muted fashion.

== Release and promotion ==
The Beta Band was highly anticipated, with Spin calling it "one of the most anticipated releases in Britain since Oasis' Definitely Maybe". Prior to release, The Beta Band was played before an invite-only industry audience in a studio/bar in Shoreditch, London, which included Noel Gallagher and Verve guitarist Nick McCabe. The band were in attendance, "looking slightly embarrassed, like gate crashers at a party in their own home", according to Craig McLean. Gallagher praised the album when talking to an NME journalist. As the band told Lydia Vanderloo of CMJ New Music Monthly, the band did not enjoy promoting the album. The Beta Band was released by Regal Records in the United Kingdom on 21 June 1999, and by Astralwerks in the United States on 29 June 1999. Astralwerks also released "Round the Bend" and "The Cow's Song" as a promotional cassette single in the US. Upon its release, The Beta Band debuted and peaked at number 18 on the UK Albums Chart and stayed on the chart for two weeks.

=== Band denouncement ===
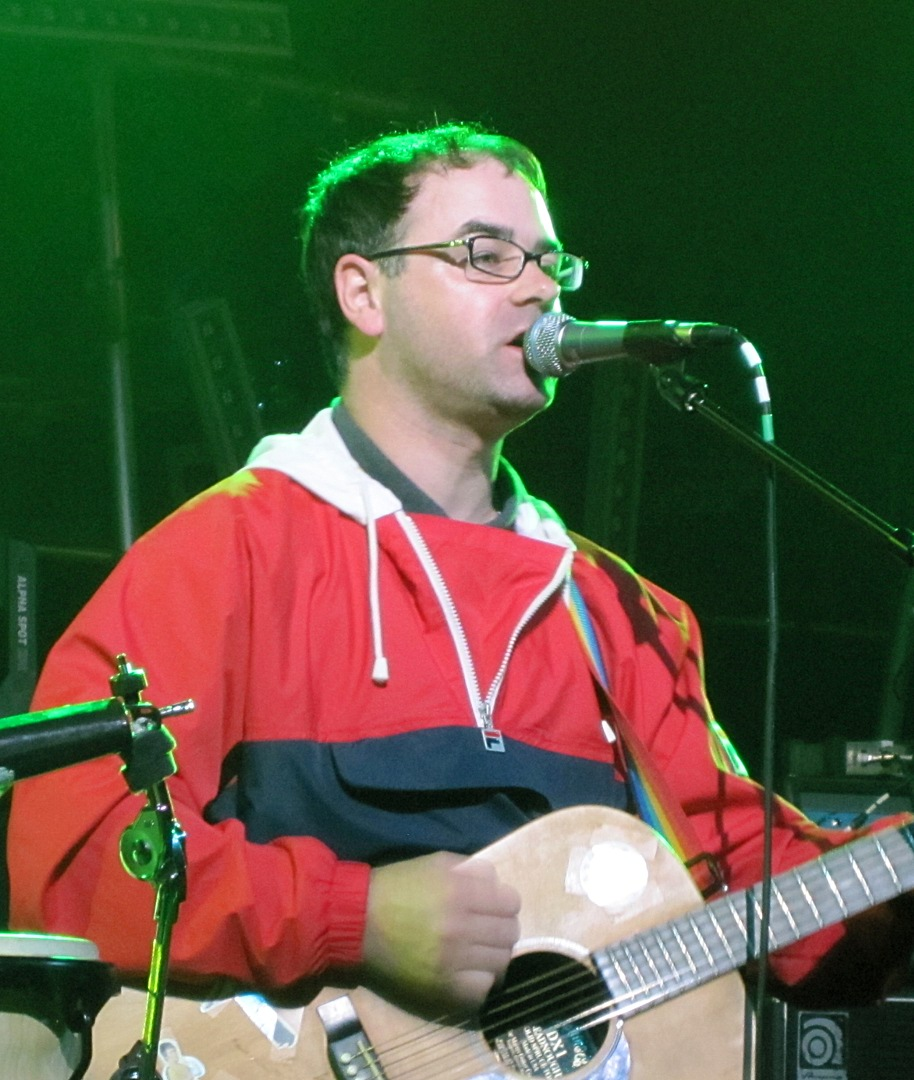
Band leader Steve Mason (pictured in 2010) infamously denounced the album.

A week prior to the album's release, Steve Mason infamously denounced the album as "fucking awful", adding that "it's definitely the worst record we've ever made and it's probably one of the worst records that'll come out this year." Speaking to NME, he said the album contained "some terrible songs", opining that none of the album's tracks were fully written or developed, dismissing them as "[h]alf-written songs with jams in the middle.” Greentree felt the production should have been less muddy, while Maclean noted that their apparent shortcomings were the band's fault; however, the band also blamed Regal for their dissatisfaction with the final album, including the abandoning of the ambient disc, which they saw as having been incomplete, and for not providing them with enough time or money to work on the album satisfyingly. Maclean later said that the band were in part trying to be reactionary: "In those days, Oasis would release a new record and claim, 'This is the greatest ever!' So there was an element of us going the other way.”

The statements immediately caused tension between the band and their label; The Guardian quoted "an enraged EMI chairman" as demanding to know "what the fuck is going on with the Beta Band?" The newspaper said the band "began a public slagging match with their record company." Miles Leonard, boss of Regal and the band's manager, dismissed their complaints, calling them "lame excuses" as "they had as much time as they wanted to have to make it, they were not forced to do anything they didn't want to." However, he did admit that some of the financial constraints led him to prevent the band's continental recording idea, but felt the album was "nowhere near as bad as they say", despite feeling it could have been better. By the time of follow-up album Hot Shots II (2001), the band's opinion on The Beta Band had not changed and spoke out against it being mentioned to them in interviews, with Greentree adding: "We just never felt the album was properly finished." Mason later said, "I sometimes wonder how that album would have been received if I'd kept my mouth shut." In 2025, he said: "We were still finding a way of writing together. The best tracks are the ones we worked hardest on."

== Critical reception ==
Professional ratings
Review scores
Source	Rating
AllMusic	4/5 stars
Entertainment Weekly	A−
The Guardian	4/5 stars
The Independent	3/5 stars
The List	5/5 stars
NME	6/10
Pitchfork	8.6/10
Q	4/5 stars
Rolling Stone	3/5 stars
Select	3/5

The Beta Band was less well received by music critics than the Beta Band's previous releases. According to Pitchfork's Stuart Berman, the album "deflated the ballooning expectations surrounding the group in the wake of The Three EPs with all the elegance and subtlety of a whoopee cushion." While many critics praised the band's ambitions, the album was also concurrently criticised as overstuffed and messy. In a retrospective piece, Derek Miller of Stylus Magazine disagreed that it was messy, saying it was "brave and cohesive", and noted how "they manage to somehow form a whole out of shattered, uneven pieces. It's awkward, Dalian, almost completely disinterested in closing the circle, and that’s the beauty in its madness."

Among original reviews, Brent DiCrescenzo of Pitchfork hailed The Beta Band as a unique sounding album that was "so psychedelic, yet not excessively experimental." Ron Hart, writing for CMJ New Music Monthly, was favourable, praising the album and how it turned "experimental dabblings" into a "fully realised concept". Rob Sheffield of Rolling Stone said the band "layer warped voices, pastoral guitars and random sound effects over slow-motion loops to evoke a chance meeting between King Crimson circa 1969 and Happy Mondays circa 1989", highlighting "The Cow's Wrong". Robert Christgau of The Village Voice gave the album a three-star honourable mention rating, signifying "an enjoyable effort consumers attuned to its overriding aesthetic or individual vision may well treasure." He stated that the band is "still lost in sound, but oriented enough here to make tunes out of it."

Writing several months after the release of The Beta Band, Tom Ewing of Freaky Trigger called it "the most troublesome album of 1999," highlighting how "its makers disown it, its few disciples adore it, a whole lot of people hate it, and a whole lot more like me just don't know what to make of it, but keep playing it anyway. While there are certainly good bits and bad bits on The Beta Band, it’s not always possible to work out which is which, let alone pull them apart. And the funny thing is that after a few months you stop caring and just take the whole damn lot as it comes."

At the end of 1999, The Beta Band was ranked in several publications' lists of the year's best albums; Intro named it 9th, Mojo named it the 10th, Rockdelux named it the 26th, Muzik named it the 27th, and NME named it the 36th. In a retrospective review, AllMusic critic Jason Ankeny thought that the album "constantly runs the risk of collapsing into complete self-indulgence." Nevertheless, Ankeny further stated: " In its way the Beta Band's genius is their wanton disregard for niceties like verses, choruses, and melodies; rejecting musical theory in favor of the chaos theory, the album's neither a masterpiece nor a mess, but both." Miles Bowe of Stereogum have conceded no less that "everyone knew that the record was rushed, and that maybe the band didn’t have enough time to fully develop the songs or lyrics as much," while also noting that "people tend to forget that The Beta Band is not 'fucking awful' — it’s actually pretty fucking great."

== Legacy ==
"The Beta Band stands as a time capsule of possibly the last instance when a group this strange could not just get signed to a major label, but use the company dime to make themselves sound even stranger."

— Stuart Berman of Pitchfork, 2013

In retrospect, The Beta Band has been re-assessed by some critics and considered underrated. Writing in 2005, Jess Harvell of Pitchfork felt the band were neglected by critics and said "there's not a single band in the past year with the balls– or lack of sense, your call– to release a debut album as overgrown with ideas (not always good ones, mind you) as The Beta Band." Stuart Berman, also of Pitchfork, described The Beta Band as the group's most notorious release and felt it was the last known example of a "group this strange" signing to a major label and then using their new label to make even stranger music, especially when considering the abandoned ambient bonus disc. "If the record violently vascillates between fascinating and frustrating on a song-by-song basis," he said, "its over-arching oddness retains its own peculiar allure."

Derek Miller of Stylus Magazine said that by the time the band split up in 2004, The Beta Band was widely considered to be "unnecessarily difficult, a short side-step in the career of a remarkably talented band", but he felt the album had been long underrated and was due for re-evaluation, praising its unique sound and adding that it "remains the broken-toothed step-child with a little bit of dander on the lip and a tangle of hair on its back, but Christ those eyes, so keen and full of mischief, forgive the ugly parts." Pitchfork founder Ryan Schreiber called The Beta Band "the greatest acid-burnt full-length of the late 90s", saying that although it "took some getting used to, since half of its songs were, to put it gently, cracked", the "densely layered electronic psychedelia" songs proved the band as "one of the few modern electronic-based bands capable of successfully splicing hundreds of self-created sources into huge, pastoral symphonies, grounded in both pop music and Dalí surrealism." The album is featured in Mojo magazine's book The Mojo Collection, which lists what its authors consider to be the 1,000 greatest albums of all time.

== Track listing ==
All tracks written by The Beta Band.

1. "The Beta Band Rap" – 4:41
2. "It's Not Too Beautiful" – 8:29
3. "Simple Boy" – 2:18
4. "Round the Bend" – 4:56
5. "Dance O'er the Border" – 5:33
6. "Brokenupadingdong" – 4:46
7. "Number 15" – 6:49
8. "Smiling" – 8:35
9. "The Hard One" – 10:06
10. "The Cow's Wrong" – 5:49

2018 reissue bonus CD

1. "Happiness in Colour" – 29:31
2. "The Hut" – 22:32

== Personnel ==
Adapted from the liner notes of The Beta Band

- Steve Mason – vocals
- Richard Greentree – bass
- Robin Jones – drums
- Chris Allison – producer, recorder
- John Maclean – sampler, turntables
- Fergus Percell – human beatbox (track 5)
- Kingsley – vocals (track 1)
- Neil Richardson – trumpet (track 9)
- Gordon Anderson – lyrics (track 10)
- Stephen Mason – lyrics (track 10)
