= The Aliens (Scottish band) =

Scottish band

- Origin: Edinburgh, Scotland
- Genres: Indie rock, neo-psychedelia, psychedelic rock, electronica, funk
- Years active: 2005–2008; 2019–present
- Labels: EMI; Pet Rock Records
- Members: Gordon Anderson; John Maclean; Robin Jones
- Website: www.thealiens.co.uk

The Aliens are a Scottish band consisting of former Beta Band members Gordon Anderson (lead vocals, guitar), John Maclean (keyboards, backing vocals) and Robin Jones (drums, backing vocals). They have released three albums, four EPs, one live album and numerous singles. Their debut album, Astronomy for Dogs (2007) reached #46 on the UK Albums Chart.

== History ==
The band formed in Edinburgh in 2005 after Maclean and Jones had left the Beta Band the previous year, asking Anderson to join their new project. Anderson had formed the Beta Band with Steve Mason in 1996 (leaving soon after formation due to illness) and had been friends with Maclean since their school days in St Andrews.

Their first release, the EP Alienoid Starmonica, recorded by John Williamson, was released to the UK iTunes Store on 20 March 2006, and on CD and 12" vinyl on 8 May 2006 on their own EMI imprint, Pet Rock. The majority of the material was originally written by Anderson. The band made their touring debut in November of that year.

The Aliens released their first album, Astronomy for Dogs, on 19 March 2007. The album was self-produced and recorded in the Cave, a small recording space beneath the Forest Cafe in Edinburgh, before being printed at Olympic Studios in London. The release was timed to coincide with a ten-date UK tour, but this had to be canceled due to Gordon Anderson breaking his clavicle climbing up a tree. The tour was rescheduled to May/June of that same year. In October 2007 they toured North America.

In spring of 2008, the band cancelled all shows except their festival appearances due to the increasing ill health of Gordon Anderson during the recording of the second album; however, on his recovery the band completed a string of UK festival dates in July. The new album, Luna was released on 29 September 2008 and was preceded by the single "Magic Man", released on 22 September.

On 4 July 2019, the Aliens' Facebook page was reactivated. The live album Live on the Moon was released on CD on 29 November 2019; a limited run vinyl edition followed in February 2020. On 20 February 2020, the band released their first new material since their initial split in 2008, publishing "Bb, wdylm" on Youtube.

== Discography ==
=== Studio albums ===
- Astronomy for Dogs (2007)
- Luna (2008)
- Doorway Amnesia (2021)

=== Live albums ===
- Live on the Moon (2019)

=== Extended plays ===
- Alienoid Starmonica (2006)
- The Sunlamp Show EP (2009)
- Electronville (2020)
- Back to Beyond (2021)

=== Singles ===
- "The Happy Song" (2006)
- "Setting Sun" (2007)
- "Robot Man" (2007)
- "Magic Man" (2008)
