= Heroes to Zeros =

Studio album by The Beta Band

Studio album by the Beta Band
- Released: 26 April 2004
- Recorded: September 2002 – November 2003; Rockfield Studios
- Genres: Electronic, rock
- Length: 42:13
- Labels: Regal; Astralwerks
- Producer: The Beta Band

The Beta Band chronology
Hot Shots II (2001)	Heroes to Zeros (2004)	The Best of The Beta Band (2005)

Heroes to Zeros is the third and final studio album by Scottish musical group the Beta Band, released on 26 April 2004 by Regal Records. It was produced by the Beta Band and mixed by Nigel Godrich. It reached 18 in the UK charts.

The cover illustration was created by comic book writer and artist Kaare Andrews. The Beta Band logo for the album was created by comic book artist Dave McCaig, later to be reused on The Best of the Beta Band.

The song "Liquid Bird" features a sample of "Painted Bird" by Siouxsie and the Banshees.

Mason later said, "We shouldn't have produced it ourselves, and if you think we did a bad job of producing it, we made an even worse job mixing it. We presented it to the label, and they immediately handed the whole thing over to Nigel Godrich to mix."

== Reception ==
Professional ratings
Aggregate scores
Source	Rating
Metacritic	74/100
Review scores
Source	Rating
AllMusic	4.5/5 stars
Entertainment Weekly	A−
The Guardian	3/5 stars
The Independent	3/5 stars
Mojo	4/5 stars
Paste	4/5 stars
Pitchfork	6.9/10
Q	4/5 stars
The Rolling Stone Album Guide	4/5 stars
Spin	B−

The album was included in the book 1001 Albums You Must Hear Before You Die.

== Track listing ==
All tracks written by Steve Mason, John Maclean, Richard Greentree, and Robin Jones.

No.	Title	Length
1.	"Assessment"	4:34
2.	"Space"	4:00
3.	"Lion Thief"	3:27
4.	"Easy"	2:32
5.	"Wonderful"	4:39
6.	"Troubles"	2:34
7.	"Out-Side"	4:06
8.	"Space Beatle"	3:40
9.	"Rhododendron"	1:36
10.	"Liquid Bird"	3:23
11.	"Simple"	3:47
12.	"Pure For"	3:55
Total length:		42:13

== Additional musicians ==
- "Assessment" brass section

- Pete Fry – trombone
- Neil Martin – trumpet
- Pete Gainey – saxophone

- "Simple" and "Troubles" strings section

- Dominic Pecher – cello
- Alex Lyon – viola
- Ben Lee – violin
- Ruston Pomeroy – violin

== Singles ==
=== "Assessment" ===
==== United Kingdom ====
- released 12 April 2004

CD 1 REG102CD: "Assessment" / "Shrek"
CD 2 REG102CDS: "Assessment" / "Shrek" / "Assessment" (C Swing's bootleg mix) / "Assessment" (video)
12" CHEMST21: "Assessment" / "Shrek" / "Assessment" (C Swing's bootleg mix)

==== United States ====
- released 18 May 2004

CD ASW 49063: "Assessment" / "Shrek" / "Assessment" (C Swing's bootleg mix) / "Assessment" (video)
12" ASW 48755: "Assessment" / "Shrek" / "Assessment" (C Swing's bootleg mix)

=== "Out-Side" ===
==== United Kingdom ====
- released 12 July 2004

CD 1 REG110CD: "Out-Side" (radio edit) / "Out-Side" (Roman Nose remix)
CD 2 REG110CDS: "Out-Side" (radio edit) / "Out-Side" (Roman Nose remix) / "Out-Side" (Depth Charge remix) / "Out-Side" (video)
12" REG110: "Out-Side" (radio edit) / "Out-Side" (Roman Nose remix)
