= International Film Festival of St Andrews =

Film festival in Scotland

Sands: International Film Festival of St Andrews
- Genre: Film festival
- Frequency: Annually, in Spring
- Venue: Byre Theatre; University of St Andrews
- Locations: St Andrews, Scotland, UK
- Inaugurated: March 2022
- Founder: Joe Russo
- Most recent: 17–19 April 2026
- Director: Ania Trzebiatowska
- Sponsor: AGBO
- Website: sands-iff.com

The International Film Festival of St Andrews, known in full as Sands: International Film Festival of St Andrews, is an annual film festival held in St Andrews, Scotland. It is co-produced by the Byre Theatre and the Film Studies Department at the University of St Andrews with lead sponsorship from Joe Russo through his production company, AGBO. The festival is a three-day event showcasing international cinema to local, national and international audiences, as well as hosting film-related events and workshops for filmmakers and creators. In 2024, the inaugural Sands golf tournament became part of the festival's wider activities.

== History ==
Joe Russo developed affection for Scotland and a close relationship with the University of St Andrews after his daughter enrolled at the university to study film in 2014. This included working with the university's film academics to judge student film festivals and delivering guest lectures. Inspired by his experience and engagement with the community, he proposed launching a film festival with the university.

== Editions ==
| Year | Headliner | Speakers | Opening | Ending | Ref |
|---|---|---|---|---|---|
| 2022 | Joe Russo | Mollye Asher, Laura Carreira, Jono MacLeod and Adura Onashile | My Old School (2022) (Scotland) | Long Live My; Happy Head (2022) (Scotland) | |
| 2023 | Stanley Tucci | Reinaldo Marcus Green, Yvonne Isimeme Ibazebo, Paul Mezey, Ellen Mirojnick, Donald Mustard, Ita O'Brien, Joe Russo, Margery Simkin, John Sloss and Iain Smith | Citadel (2023) (Note: As a surprise screening for the world premiere of the first two episodes of the TV Series) (United States) | Rye Lane (2023) (United Kingdom) | |
| 2024 | Steven Soderbergh | Anna Hints, Harry and Tom Holland, Grainne Humphreys, Naqqash Kahlid, Chris van der Kuyl, Rachel Lambert, Donald Mustard, Russo brothers, Alan Silvestri and Debra Zane | Mami Wata (2023) (Nigeria) | Maestra (2023) (United States) | |
| 2025 | Dame Joanna Lumley | Amman Abbasi, Kharmel Cochrane, Frank E. Flowers, James Griffiths, John Maclean, Manon Ouimet, Russo brothers, Elizabeth Sankey, Jeffrey E. Stern, Kathleen Wallfisch, Jeremy Warmsley and Kim Yutani | The Ballad of Wallis Island (2025) (United Kingdom) | Tornado (2025) (United Kingdom) | |
| 2026 | Craig Armstrong | Tony Benna, Gary Clark, Mohammadreza Eyni, Eva H.D, Charlie Kaufman, Sara Khaki, Zamo Mkhwanazi, Laura Mulvey, James Price, Joe Russo, Angela Russo-Otstot and John Sloss | Power Ballad (2026) (United States) | Cactus Pears (2025) (India) | |

== Other Film Festivals in St Andrews ==
The event is not to be confused with the St Andrews Film Festival founded in 2018 and the student-run St Andrews Green Film Festival founded in 2013.
