= Chris Allison =

British musical artist (born 1961)

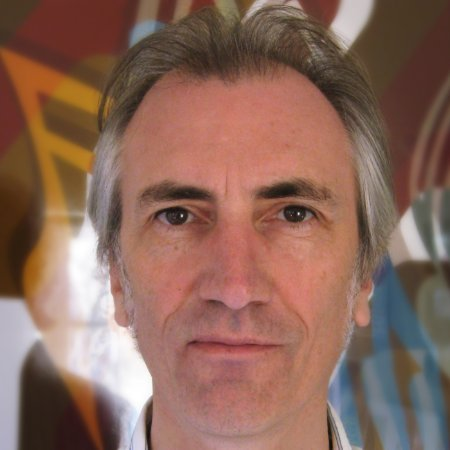
- Allison in 2012
- Born: Christopher John Allison; 1961 (age 64–65)
- Occupations: Record producer and founder head of Sonic360 Records

Christopher John Allison (born 1961) is a British record producer and founder head of Sonic360 Records.

Influenced by a range of musical styles encompassing rock, jazz, hip-hop, electronic, world and Latin. In his career spanning 1984 to the present, Allison has worked mainly as a record producer and label owner.

He is also well known amongst fans of the band Shack for having the only copy of their album Waterpistol following a studio fire, allowing it to be released.

== History ==
Allison got his first production break in 1987 producing The Wedding Present’s "My Favourite Dress" single. This became an indie hit with John Peel championing and giving it a No. 6 entry in his 1987 Festive Fifty. Of the same year he produced the Wedding Present's debut album George Best which racked up a further four song entries in the Festive 50. The George Best album and accompanying EPs were such an indie success that RCA snapped them up and Allison went onto produce their second album, 'Bizarro’, which went on to sell 100,000 albums and garner a further five entries in John Peel's Festive Fifty of 1989. A UK singles chart entry at #33 for the song 'Kennedy' and the album Bizarro itself reaching #22 in the UK album charts. Allison went on to produce other Peel favourites - The Flatmates (#2 indie hit with ‘Shimmer’), Pale Saints and Ned's Atomic Dustbin.

Showing his versatility as a producer Allison moved away from indie guitars and on to the psychedelic folk/rock of Liverpool band Shack and the album ‘Waterpistol’. Brothers Mick and John Head were a writing force to be reckoned with, influences ranged from classic pop to jazz and folk. Things did not go too well, as Allison recalls: "Mick could never finish anything. I've never worked with anyone like him, but he's a songwriting genius and one of the most gifted artists I've ever worked with."

Allison recalls that Head would disappear for days on end during the recording, so he took drastic steps. "I locked him in the studio and told him I wouldn't let him out until he'd done five vocals. He was furious and wasn't used to working without a few drinks, but the results were amazing."

After the recording Allison meanwhile had taken off to do his Jack Kerouac in the US and had with him his producer's copy DAT of 'Waterpistol' but in a cruel twist of fate had left it in his hire car. When he returned and learnt of the fire he miraculously managed to track it down through the hire car company. But everything lay dormant until German Indie Marina rang Leahy's office and said it wanted to release the album. So in 1995, one of 1991's best records was released, a tour-de-force of timeless pop songs that sounded as fresh as anything heard that year. Q Magazine included it in the Greatest Album Stories Ever (April 2012).

Allison went on to work with another Liverpool favourite The Real People. The track ‘Believer’ was a UK singles chart #38 entry produced by Allison. 1998 saw Allison producing the album ‘Slain by Urusei Yatsura’ by Glaswegian band Urusei Yatsura with song 'Hello Tiger' reaching #40 in the UK Singles Chart.

The Beta Band came to Allison's attention in 1998, thanks to Parlophone A&R Miles Leonard. Leonard was a Shack ‘Waterpistol’ fan. He asked Allison to produce the ‘Los Amigos del Beta Bandidos’ and ‘The Patty Patty Sound’ EP's, that were later included in their entirety on The Three E.P.'s UK album chart position #35 and this led to production work on the album ‘The Beta Band’ UK album chart position #18. Newly signed Beta Band stable mates Coldplay’s early recordings were produced by Allison. ‘Things got off to a productive start. The first track we worked on was ‘High Speed’, which ultimately proved good enough to make it onto the first album. Allison describes it thus: ‘You’ll notice it is quite a bit different to other tracks, because there are other sounds going on in it: we wanted to mix a soundscape in with the classic rock sound on that particular track. To give it a slightly different perspective I guess, with the full willingness and understanding of the band. I thought ‘High Speed’ was a really good marriage between the classic rock sound and the new sound that were developing out of it, something that was more atmospheric’.

‘Don’t Panic’, ‘See You Soon’ and ‘High Speed’ were featured on ‘The Blue Room (EP)' and ‘High Speed’ also featured on the Grammy award-winning album ‘Parachutes’ with the album reaching #1 on the UK Album Charts. Allison's version of ‘Don’t Panic’ is a more atmospheric version than the one that appears on the album Parachutes. In December 1999 looking for a new challenge Allison took off to Monterrey Mexico to produce the ‘Juan Manuel’ album for Latin America superstars ‘Plastilina Mosh’ signed to EMI Mexico. On his travels he discovered early Sonic360 signing and Mexican electro/funk/Latin artist Kinky, whose eponymous album was also produced by Allison. The album was nominated for a Latin Grammy at the 3rd Annual Latin Grammy Awards and a Grammy at the 45th Grammy Awards.

== Sonic360 ==
Chris Allison is Owner and CEO of music labels Sonic360, Allison launched Sonic360 in June 2000.

Artists that have signed to the label include Mexican electro-funk rock outfit Kinky who signed an exclusive worldwide deal with Sonic360 in the summer of 2000. Kinky's eponymous debut album produced by Allison

== Selected discography ==
P=Produced / E=Engineered / M=Mixed / R=Recorded

- Acida – La Vida Real (album, Sonic360)
- Kinky – Atlas (album, Sonic360) – Exec. Producer (Grammy® Nominated)
- Kinky – Kinky (album, Sonic360) – P/M (Grammy® Nominated)
- Coldplay – The Blue Room (EP, Capitol/EMI) – P/M/E
- Coldplay – "High Speed" from Parachutes (Capitol/EMI) – P/M/E (Grammy® Awarded Album)
- Coldplay – Acoustic CD (EP, Capitol/EMI) – P/M/E
- Plastilina Mosh – Juan Manuel (album, EMI Music Mexico/Astralwerks) – P/M/E
- The Beta Band – The Beta Band (album, Capitol/EMI) – P/M/E
- The Beta Band – The 3 EP's (album, Capitol/EMI) - P/M/E
- The Beta Band – Los Amigos del Beta Bandidos (EP, Capitol/EMI) – P/M/E
- The Beta Band – The Patty Patty Sound (EP, Capitol/EMI) – P/M/E
- Dot Allison – "Message Personnel" from Afterglow (Heavenly) – P/M/E
- Paul K – Wilderness of Mirrors (album, Alias (U.S.)) – P/M
- Urusei Yatsura – Slain by Urusei Yatsura (album, Che/Coalition) – P/M/E
- Urusei Yatsura – Hello Tiger (EP, Che/Coalition) – P/M/E
- Urusei Yatsura – Slain by Elf (EP, Che/Coalition) – P/M/E
- The Chainsaw Kittens – Angel on the Range (album, Mammoth) – P/M
- Ned's Atomic Dustbin – "Scrawl" (Sony Music) – P/M
- Ned's Atomic Dustbin – "Prostrate" (Sony Music) – P/M
- Shack – Waterpistol (album, Ghetto/Marina) – P/M
- The Real People – "Believer" (Sony Music) – P/M
- The Real People – "Dream On" (Sony Music) – P/M
- The Real People – "What You Want" (Sony Music) – P/M
- The Milltown Brothers – "Which Way Should I Jump" (Big Round Recs.) – P/M
- Pale Saints – Half Life (EP, 4AD) – P/M
- Eat – Mr & Mrs Smack (EP, Fiction) – P/M
- The Flatmates – Shimmer (EP, Subway Records) – P/M
- The Wedding Present – Bizzaro (album, BMG/RCA) – P/M
- The Wedding Present – Kennedy (EP, BMG/RCA) – P/M
- The Wedding Present – George Best (album, Red Rhino) – P/M
- The Wedding Present – My Favourite Dress (EP, Red Rhino) – P/M
