= Tornado (2025 film) =

Film by John Maclean

- Theatrical release poster
- Directed by: John Maclean
- Screenplay by: John Maclean
- Story by: John Maclean; Kate Leys
- Produced by: Leonora Darby; James Harris; Mark Lane
- Starring: Tim Roth; Jack Lowden; Takehiro Hira; Joanne Whalley; Kōki
- Cinematography: Robbie Ryan
- Edited by: Ryan Morrison; Selina Macarthur
- Music by: Jed Kurzel
- Production company: Tea Shop Productions
- Distributed by: Lionsgate UK
- Release dates: 26 February 2025 (Glasgow Film Festival); 13 June 2025 (United Kingdom)
- Running time: 91 minutes
- Country: United Kingdom
- Language: English
- Box office: $213,795

Tornado is a 2025 British period action drama film written and directed by John Maclean, and starring Kōki, Jack Lowden, Takehiro Hira, and Tim Roth.

The film had its world premiere at the Glasgow Film Festival on 26 February 2025, and was released in the United Kingdom on 13 June 2025.

== Plot ==
In Scotland in the 1790s, a young Japanese woman named Tornado flees from a gang of brigands led by the ruthless Sugarman. Tornado stumbles upon a remote mansion and slips inside to hide. Shortly after, the gang arrives and occupies the mansion, threatening the family that lives there as they search for her. Tornado hides in an upstairs room where the floorboards are rotting. As one of the gang members plays a piano downstairs, another explores the upper floors and falls through the decayed floor. This gives Tornado the opportunity to escape into the nearby hills, although she is spotted by Sugarman's son Little Sugar. In the wilderness, Tornado comes across a travelling circus. She hides among the performers and reconnects with a strongman who is an old friend of her father.

In a flashback, Tornado is seen travelling with her father, Fujin. Fujin is a former samurai swordsman who now earns a living as a puppeteer and has trained Tornado in both skills. Sugarman and his gang, who have just robbed a nearby church of a large quantity of gold, stop to watch Tornado and Fujin's performance. During the show, Tornado notices a boy in the crowd picking pockets but says nothing. He manages to steal the gang's gold without being noticed. Tornado sees the theft and chases the boy to their wagon, where she hides him and the gold. After they set off, she throws him out onto the road while retaining the stolen gold. A short distance ahead, a fallen tree blocks the forest path. The brigands catch up to the wagon and Tornado flees into the woods to hide the gold in a hole, with the boy following behind. Back at the wagon, Sugarman confronts Fujin; it is clear that they already know one another. Fujin is shot and killed by the gang's archer, although he manages to slice Sugarman in the stomach as he dies. Tornado and the boy escape once more.

The film returns to the present, where Tornado is recovering with the strongman in the circus. The peace is shattered when Sugarman's gang arrives. They destroy the circus, shoot the strongman, and kill a young knife-thrower. During the chaos, Little Sugar confronts Sugarman, who has bullied him his whole life and with whom he is increasingly at odds. Having already secretly murdered his father's right-hand man, Kitten, he attacks his father, who stabs and kills him. As Tornado and the boy flee, the boy is shot in the leg. After they reach the wagon, he dies from his injury. Tornado buries both the boy and Fujin in a quiet, wooded area. She finds the gold, which her father moved from the hole to the branches of a tree, and drops it into the middle of a lake.

Grief turns to fury. Tornado tracks down and kills the remaining members of Sugarman's gang, one by one. In the final confrontation, she finds Sugarman near death from his stomach wound. He looks at her and, with his final words, calls her a samurai. Tornado encounters the surviving members of the circus, led by Vienna, but leaves with only her swords and some of the gold that she retained.

== Cast ==
- Kōki as Tornado
- Jack Lowden as Little Sugar
- Takehiro Hira as Fujin, Tornado's father
- Tim Roth as Sugarman
- Joanne Whalley as Vienna Crawford
- Rory McCann as Kitten
- Alex Macqueen as the Laird
- Ian Hanmore as Thief
- Denis Okwera as Psychotic Bandit

== Production ==
Tornado was written and directed by John Maclean. It was produced by Tea Shop Productions, with financial support from Screen Scotland, the BFI and Ashland Hill Media Finance, and funding from The National Lottery. In May 2023, it was reported that Jack Lowden, Takehiro Hira and Kōki were cast in leading roles. Principal photography with Robbie Ryan as cinematographer began in Edinburgh, Scotland in January 2024.

Tornado was shot on 2-perf KODAK 35mm film.

== Release ==
HanWay Films held sales at the 2023 Cannes Film Festival. In January 2024, Lionsgate UK acquired the United Kingdom and Ireland rights. IFC Films acquired rights to the United States, Canada, Australia and New Zealand for a 30 May 2025 limited cinema release. It is also expected to stream on Shudder.

The film had its world premiere at the Glasgow Film Festival on 26 February 2025. It was the closing film of the International Film Festival of St Andrews 2025. It was released in the UK by Lionsgate on 13 June 2025.

== Reception ==
On the review aggregator website Rotten Tomatoes, 63% of 67 critics' reviews are positive. The website's consensus reads: "Marking writer-director John Maclean's welcome return to the Western genre, Tornado's melange of tones doesn't always cohere but is unique enough to be worth giving a whirl." Metacritic, which uses a weighted average, assigned the film a score of 57 out of 100, based on 17 critics, indicating "mixed or average" reviews.

Andy Crump, in a B rating for The A.V. Club, said: "It’s more that the specific combination of jidaigeki period piece, highland character study, and frontier justice that’s new, making Tornado a harrowing, blustery, violent amalgamation of an idiosyncratic spirit."

=== Accolades ===
Kirsty Halliday was nominated for best costume design, and Jed Kurzel for best original music, at the British Independent Film Awards 2025.
