= About the Light =

Studio album by Steve Mason
- Released: January 18, 2019
- Length: 39:52
- Label: Domino, Double Six

Steve Mason chronology
Meet the Humans (2016)	About the Light (2019)

Professional ratings
Aggregate scores
Source	Rating
AnyDecentMusic?	7.6/10
Metacritic	81/100
Review scores
Source	Rating
AllMusic	4/5 stars
Clash	9/10
MusicOMH	4/5 stars
Pitchfork	6.8/10

About the Light is the fourth studio album by Scottish musician Steve Mason. It was released on 18 January 2019 through Domino Recording Company.

== Track listing ==
No.	Title	Length
1.	"America Is Your Boyfriend"	3:42
2.	"Rocket"	4:58
3.	"No Clue"	3:10
4.	"About the Light"	4:26
5.	"Fox on the Rooftop"	4:39
6.	"Stars Around My Heart"	4:06
7.	"Spanish Brigade"	3:31
8.	"Don't Know Where"	3:57
9.	"Walking Away from Love"	3:40
10.	"The End"	3:43

== Charts ==
Chart	Peak position
UK Albums (OCC)	38
