= Black Affair =

- Members: Jimmy Edgar, Steve Mason

Black Affair is an electronic music duo formed by Jimmy Edgar and Steve Mason.

== History ==
Around 2008 Edgar began collaborating with vocalist Steve Mason of Scotland's The Beta Band, and together they formed the electronic music duo Black Affair. Referencing musician Bell Biv Devoe their primary influence, Mason described Edgar's sonic contribution to the group as "sophisticated, with an air of fashion. But ultimately it's pop music - with slightly dark sexual undertones."

About their May 2008 promo single "It's Real," The Guardian described it as "the finest example of 80s electro-referencing funk clatter since, ooh, last year's 'Fancy Footwork' by US Cameo/Kleer-ish nostalgic futurists Chromeo at the very least." The article explained the group's music draws on "old school R&B, electro, early hip-hop, Chicago house, Detroit techno, even the pristine white synthpop that influenced all of the previous black artists in the first place - poptronic forgemasters such as Kraftwerk, Yazoo, the Human League, Depeche Mode, Soft Cell and New Order."

Edgar co-produced & engineered their Pleasure Pressure Point album in 2008. He also was involved with the media for the album's promotional campaign, producing and directing a music video, photography, and the album and single's artwork.

== Members ==
- Jimmy Edgar
- Steve Mason

== Discography ==
=== Albums ===
Albums by Black Affair
Year	Album title	Release details
2008	Pleasure Pressure Point	Released: 2008; Label: V2 Records; Format: CD, digital
