= High Fidelity (film) =

2000 film by Stephen Frears

- Theatrical release poster
- Directed by: Stephen Frears
- Screenplay by: D. V. DeVincentis; Steve Pink; John Cusack; Scott Rosenberg
- Based on: High Fidelity by Nick Hornby
- Produced by: Tim Bevan; Rudd Simmons
- Starring: John Cusack; Jack Black; Lisa Bonet; Joelle Carter; Joan Cusack; Sara Gilbert; Iben Hjejle; Todd Louiso; Lili Taylor; Natasha Gregson Wagner; Catherine Zeta-Jones; Tim Robbins
- Cinematography: Seamus McGarvey
- Edited by: Mick Audsley
- Music by: Howard Shore
- Production companies: Touchstone Pictures; Working Title Films; Dogstar Films; New Crime Productions
- Distributed by: Buena Vista Pictures Distribution
- Release dates: March 17, 2000 (SXSW); March 31, 2000 (United States); July 21, 2000 (United Kingdom)
- Running time: 114 minutes
- Countries: United Kingdom; United States
- Language: English
- Budget: $30 million
- Box office: $47.1 million

High Fidelity is a 2000 romantic comedy-drama film directed by Stephen Frears and starring John Cusack alongside an ensemble cast of Jack Black, Lisa Bonet, Joelle Carter, Joan Cusack, Sara Gilbert, Iben Hjejle, Todd Louiso, Lili Taylor, Natasha Gregson Wagner, Catherine Zeta-Jones, and Tim Robbins. Based on the 1995 novel of the same name by Nick Hornby, with the setting moved from London to Chicago and the protagonist's name changed, the film follows Rob Gordon (Cusack), a record store owner who is recently single after a breakup with Laura (Hjejle), leading him to look back on his worst five breakups while attempting to reconcile with her. Hornby expressed surprise at how faithful the adaptation was, saying "at times, it appears to be a film in which John Cusack reads my book."

Released theatrically in the United States by Buena Vista Pictures Distribution on March 31, 2000, High Fidelity grossed $47.1 million worldwide and received highly positive reviews from critics, who praised the cast's performances and Frears' direction. Cusack was nominated for a Golden Globe Award for Best Actor – Motion Picture Musical or Comedy. A television series of the same name based on the film and novel starring Zoë Kravitz, Bonet's daughter, was released on Hulu on February 14, 2020.

== Plot ==
Rob Gordon is a music enthusiast who is despondent after being abruptly dumped by Laura, his live-in girlfriend of two years.

By day, Rob manages Championship Vinyl, a record store in Chicago's Wicker Park neighborhood, where he and his employees, Dick and Barry, indulge in their encyclopedic musical knowledge. They compile "Top 5" lists for every imaginable occasion, mock their few customers' tastes, and occasionally sell records. Rob compiles a list of his top 5 most memorable breakups, not including his breakup with Laura.

After Laura's friend Liz confronts Rob about their breakup, Rob describes how he once borrowed a large sum of money from Laura and also cheated on her, not knowing that Laura was pregnant, prompting her to secretly abort the baby while they reconciled. After Rob's mother calls him out on his doomed relationships, he decides on a journey to understand his relationship failures by reconnecting with his former partners on the Top 5 list.

Number 1 on the list is Allison, a girl he kissed in middle school, only for her to kiss a different boy the next day. Rob discovers she went on to marry the other boy, convincing him that he and Allison were never meant to be together. Number 2 is Penny Hardwick, his high school girlfriend who he dumped after she routinely refused to be intimate with him, only to sleep with another guy shortly afterward. He meets with her over a movie and dinner, only to discover that the sexual encounter was borderline non-consensual; Penny points out that he rejected her; not the other way around. Rob takes solace in knowing it was his own insecurity that caused the breakup. Number 3 is a trendy girl named Charlie Nicholson and his most serious relationship. Rob felt insecure around her and eventually got dumped for someone in her league, which sent him into a deep depression. He learns that she never married or had children; when they meet at a party, he realizes she is vain and elitist, allowing him to move on. Finally, Rob meets with Number 4, Sarah Kendrew, with whom he shared a post-breakup relationship after Charlie, only for her to meet another man. Reuniting with her, he discovers that she is mentally unwell and thus routinely sabotages her relationships. He later admits to himself that his breakup with Laura belongs on his Top 5 list.

Rob realizes that Laura has started seeing Ian, a lifestyle guru and their former upstairs neighbor. This makes him extremely insecure, and he resorts to stalking until Ian confronts him. Laura waits for Rob outside of his store when he gets off, and returns to his apartment with him to gather more of her things. Rob leaves to give her privacy and has a one-night stand with Marie, a singer who is also getting over a breakup.

Laura's father, who was fond of Rob, dies. Attending the funeral, Rob realizes he has never truly committed to Laura, neglecting both their relationship and his own future in the process. Laura, feeling depressed after her father's death, gets back together with Rob.

Rob meets a music columnist and develops a crush on her. While making a mixtape for her, he wonders whether he is simply jumping from one attraction to another. In a heartfelt conversation with Laura, Rob acknowledges that other women are mere fantasies, while Laura is his reality, someone he never tires of. He proposes to her, and although she thanks him for asking, she encourages him to revisit his passion for DJing.

Rob publishes an album by Vince and Justin, two teenagers who had previously caused trouble in his store. At a celebration for the release of the album organized by Laura, Barry's band performs "Let's Get It On" and are well-received, surprising Rob. Rob creates a mixtape for Laura, showing his intent to make her happy.

== Cast ==
- John Cusack as Rob Gordon
  - Drake Bell as young Rob Gordon
- Iben Hjejle as Laura
- Jack Black as Barry Judd
- Todd Louiso as Dick
- Catherine Zeta-Jones as Charlie Nicholson
- Lisa Bonet as Marie De Salle
- Sara Gilbert as Anaugh Moss
- Chris Bauer as Paul
- Lili Taylor as Sarah Kendrew
- Joan Cusack as Liz
- Tim Robbins as Ian "Ray" Raymond
- Joelle Carter as Penny Hardwick
- Chris Rehmann as Vince
- Ben Carr as Justin
- Natasha Gregson Wagner as Caroline Fortis
- Bruce Springsteen as himself (cameo)
- Ian Williams as a guy in record store (cameo)
- Al Johnson as a record store geek

== Production ==
=== Development ===
Nick Hornby's book was optioned by Disney's Touchstone Pictures in 1995, where it went into development for three years. Mike Newell was slated to direct the film with a script written by Con Air screenwriter Scott Rosenberg. Disney executive Joe Roth had a conversation with recording executive Kathy Nelson, who recommended John Cusack and his writing and producing partners D. V. DeVincentis and Steve Pink adapt the book. She had previously worked with them on Grosse Pointe Blank and felt that they had the right sensibilities for the material. According to Cusack, DeVincentis is the closest to the record-obsessive characters in the film, owning 1,000 vinyl records and thousands of CDs and tapes. They wrote a treatment that was immediately greenlit by Roth.

=== Screenplay ===
The writers decided to change the book's setting from London to Chicago because they were more familiar with the city, and it also had a "great alternative music scene", according to Pink. Cusack said, "When I read the book I knew where everything was in Chicago. I knew where the American Rob went to school and dropped out, where he used to spin records. I knew two or three different record shops when I was growing up that had a Rob, a Dick and a Barry in them". Charlotte Tudor, of the film's distributor, Buena Vista, said: "Chicago has the same feel as north London, there is a vibrant music scene, a lot of the action is set in smoky bars and, of course, there is the climate. But everyone, including Nick, felt that geography was not the central issue. It has a universal appeal". Scenes were filmed in the neighborhood of Wicker Park, and on the campus of Lane Tech High School.

Cusack found that the greatest challenge adapting the novel was pulling off Rob Gordon's frequent breaking of the fourth wall by talking directly to the audience. Influenced by the Michael Caine film Alfie, the screenwriters used this device to convey Rob's confessional inner monologue. Cusack initially rejected the approach, thinking "there'd just be too much of me." Mike Newell, who remained on as executive producer, dropped out as director and was replaced with Stephen Frears. When Frears suggested using the technique, everyone agreed.

Cusack and the writers floated the idea that Rob could have a conversation with Bruce Springsteen in his head, inspired by a reference in Hornby's book where the narrator wishes he could handle his past girlfriends as well as Springsteen does in his song "Bobby Jean" on Born in the U.S.A. They never believed they would actually get the musician to appear in the film, but thought putting him in the script would make the studio excited about it. Cusack knew Springsteen socially, and called the musician up and pitched the idea. Springsteen asked for a copy of the script and subsequently agreed to do it.

Near the film's completion, it was revealed that Scott Rosenberg would share screenplay credit with Cusack, DeVincentis & Pink. Rosenberg's original draft took place in Boston and was drastically different from Hornby's book and the writing team's adaptation. The three reached out to Rosenberg who agreed to take his name off the credits. However, Rosenberg eventually refused to do so, leading to a writing credit dispute. According to Pink, Rosenberg was given credit due to a now-abolished rule in the WGA which gave full credit to the first screenwriter attached to any adaptation for "anything they extracted from the book, or from the material from which they were adapting."

=== Casting ===
Frears was at the Berlin International Film Festival and seeing Mifune's Last Song, starring Iben Hjejle, realized that he had found the female lead. Frears read Hornby's book and enjoyed it, but did not connect with the material because it was not about his generation. He accepted the job because he wanted to work with Cusack again (after teaming on The Grifters) and liked the idea of changing the setting from London to Chicago. The director was also responsible for insisting on keeping Jack Black in the part of Barry. Black never auditioned and had initially passed on the part until Frears convinced him to take the role. Frears has said that many people from the studio came to watch his rushes. The role of Dick was originally offered to David Arquette, and Artie Lange auditioned for Barry. Todd Louiso was cast as Dick after Arquette passed on the offer. Liz Phair was also considered for the character Marie DeSalle, before Lisa Bonet was cast.

=== Filming ===
Production began on April 26, 1999, in Chicago, Illinois. Filming also took place on location at Wicker Park and the Biograph Theater, as well as authentic music venues Lounge Ax and Double Door.

== Soundtrack ==
High Fidelity: Music from the Motion Picture

Soundtrack album by Various Artists
- Released: March 28, 2000
- Recorded: 1999
- Genre: Soundtrack
- Length: 65:01
- Label: Hollywood

Professional ratings
Review scores
Source	Rating
AllMusic	4/5 stars

Track listing

1. "You're Gonna Miss Me" – 13th Floor Elevators
2. "Ev'rybody's Gonna Be Happy" – The Kinks
3. "I'm Wrong About Everything" – John Wesley Harding
4. "Oh! Sweet Nuthin'" – The Velvet Underground
5. "Always See Your Face" – Love
6. "Most of the Time" – Bob Dylan
7. "Fallen for You" – Sheila Nicholls
8. "Dry the Rain" – The Beta Band
9. "Shipbuilding" – Elvis Costello & The Attractions
10. "Cold Blooded Old Times" – Smog
11. "Let's Get It On" – Barry Jive & The Uptown Five (Jack Black)
12. "Lo Boob Oscillator" – Stereolab
13. "The Inside Game" – Royal Trux
14. "Who Loves the Sun" – The Velvet Underground
15. "I Believe (When I Fall in Love It Will Be Forever)" – Stevie Wonder

One of the challenges that the screenwriters faced was figuring out which songs would be used where in the film because Rob, Dick and Barry "are such musical snobs," according to Cusack. He and his screenwriting partners listened to 2,000 songs and picked 70 song cues.

== Release ==
High Fidelity premiered at the El Capitan Theater in Hollywood. The post-party was held at the Sunset Room, where Tenacious D performed. The film was opened in a wide release in the United States on March 31, 2000, grossing $6.4 million during its opening weekend and finishing in fifth place at the US box office behind Erin Brockovich, The Road to El Dorado, The Skulls and Romeo Must Die. It opened July 21, 2000 in the United Kingdom on 227 screens and grossed $1.1 million, finishing fourth for the weekend below Stuart Little, Chicken Run and Mission: Impossible 2. It went on to gross $47.1 million worldwide, of which $27.3 million was from the US and Canada.

== Controversy ==
High Fidelity was connected to a brief controversy surrounding the Disney/Pixar film Toy Story 2 following the October 17, 2000 release of the latter film's "Ultimate Toy Box" edition, in which around 1,000 DVD copies that were shipped to Costco stores had a pressing error which caused a scene from High Fidelity to play in the middle of Toy Story 2. The scene in question, which featured the use of the word "fuck" multiple times, prompted a number of complaints from consumers, causing Costco to eventually recall the defective units from shelves and later go on to replace them. The defect was caused by a "content mix" error according to Technicolor, which manufactured the discs, and versions of Toy Story 2 outside of the "Ultimate Toy Box" release were not affected by the manufacturing error. According to Buena Vista Home Entertainment, less than 1% of the shipped Toy Story 2 discs were printed with the High Fidelity glitch.

== Reception ==
High Fidelity received positive reviews from critics at 91% on Rotten Tomatoes, based on 165 reviews, with an average rating of 7.60/10. The critical consensus states: "The deft hand of director Stephen Frears and strong performances by the ensemble cast combine to tell an entertaining story with a rock-solid soundtrack." The film has a score of 79 out of 100 on Metacritic, based on 35 critics. Audiences polled by CinemaScore gave the film an average grade of "C+" on an A+ to F scale.

Roger Ebert gave the film four out of four and wrote, "Watching High Fidelity, I had the feeling I could walk out of the theater and meet the same people on the street — and want to, which is an even higher compliment." In his review for the Washington Post, Desson Howe praised Jack Black as "a bundle of verbally ferocious energy. Frankly, whenever he's in the scene, he shoplifts this movie from Cusack." In his review for The New York Times, Stephen Holden praised Cusack's performance, writing, "a master at projecting easygoing camaraderie, he navigates the transitions with such an astonishing naturalness and fluency that you're almost unaware of them." USA Today did not give the film a positive review: "Let's be kind and just say High Fidelity doesn't quite belong beside Grosse Pointe Blank and The Sure Thing in Cusack's greatest hits collection. It's not that he isn't good. More like miscast." In his review for Entertainment Weekly, Owen Gleiberman gave the film a "B−" rating and wrote, "In High Fidelity, Rob's music fixation is a signpost of his arrested adolescence; he needs to get past records to find true love. If the movie had had a richer romantic spirit, he might have embraced both in one swooning gesture."

Peter Travers, in his review for Rolling Stone, wrote, "It hits all the laugh bases, from grins to guffaws. Cusack and his Chicago friends—D.V. DeVincentis and Steve Pink—have rewritten Scott Rosenberg's script to catch Hornby's spirit without losing the sick comic twists they gave 1997's Grosse Pointe Blank." In his review for The Observer, Philip French wrote, "High Fidelity is an extraordinarily funny film, full of verbal and visual wit. And it is assembled with immense skill." Stephanie Zacharek, in her review for Salon.com, praised Iben Hjejle's performance: "Hjejle's Laura is supremely likable: She's so matter-of-fact and grounded that it's perfectly clear why she'd become exasperated with a guy like Rob, who perpetually refuses to grow up, but you can also see how her patience and calm are exactly the things he needs."

=== Legacy ===
The film was credited with increasing the record sales of the British indie rock group The Beta Band, whose song "Dry the Rain" and compilation album The Three E.P.'s are prominently featured in a scene. The band's American record label Astralwerks reported that sales of The Three E.P.'s quadrupled within a month of the film's release in March 2000.

Empire magazine readers voted High Fidelity the 446th greatest film in their "500 Greatest Movies of All Time" poll. It is also ranked #14 on Rotten Tomatoes' 25 Best Romantic Comedies. In its June 2010 issue, Chicago magazine rated it #1 in a list of the top 40 movies ever filmed in Chicago.

Alternative singer-songwriter Regina Spektor was watching the movie when she wrote her 2006 song "Fidelity", which marked her first entry into the Billboard charts. That same year a musical stage adaptation premiered on Broadway and ran for 13 performances. In 2010, Tanya Morgan member Donwill released the solo album Don Cusack In High Fidelity, which he recorded from the perspective of the film's character.

== Television series ==
In April 2018, ABC Signature Studios announced that it was developing a television series adaptation of High Fidelity with Midnight Radio (Scott Rosenberg, Jeff Pinkner, Josh Appelbaum, and Andre Nemec). Rosenberg would return to script the series, which features a female lead in the Cusack role. The series was adapted by Veronica West and Sarah Kucserka. In late September 2018, Zoë Kravitz, Lisa Bonet's daughter, was cast as the lead. The first season consists of ten episodes.

Originally announced for Disney's then-upcoming streaming service Disney+, it was reported in April 2019 that the series had been shifted to Hulu. Disney+'s SVP of content Agnes Chu stated that the series had "evolved" in a direction that was better-suited for Hulu.

On October 30, 2019, it was announced that the series would premiere on February 14, 2020. In August 2020, the series was canceled, after one season.
