= Lone Pigeon =

Scottish musician

- Born: Gordon Anderson
- Origin: St Andrews, Fife, Scotland
- Occupation: Musician
- Years active: 1990s–present
- Member of: The Aliens
- Formerly of: The Beta Band
- Website: www.myspace.com/lonepigeon

Gordon Anderson, also known by his stage name Lone Pigeon, is a Scottish musician. A co-founder of the Beta Band, he left the band due to ill health soon after formation. After the Beta Band's split in 2004, Anderson formed the Aliens with Beta Band members John Maclean and Robin Jones.

== Career ==
Anderson was a founding member of The Beta Band and co-wrote several of their early songs including "Dry the Rain" and "Dog's Got a Bone". Ill-health forced him to leave the band and return to Scotland, and he began to record solo under the name Lone Pigeon in 1997.

His earliest albums - 28 Secret Tracks, Moses, Auckley Craw and Honda Hedge - were released by himself and on Fence Records and are no longer for sale, but Concubine Rice (described by Allmusic as "an astonishing debut album") and Schoozzzmmii (described as "a zany but sunny folk-rock record") are available worldwide from Domino Records and (Lone Pigeon's own label) Whizzkidzz respectively.

The 'Honda Hedge' album, which was available only by mailorder, contains early versions of several of the songs later to appear on The Aliens' 'Astronomy for Dogs' (see below), including "Robotman", "Tomorrow", "Only Waiting" and "Honest Again".

After Anderson broke his shoulder falling out of a tree, he re-recorded "Robot Man" as "Robust Man".

In May 2006 an EP entitled Alienoid Starmonica was released, a collaboration with ex-Beta Band members John Maclean and Robin Jones under the name The Aliens. The Aliens have gone on to release two more singles: The Happy Song and Setting Sun. Their debut album, Astronomy for Dogs was released on 19 March 2007, published by EMI. Since the release, the band have parted company with EMI and released a new album Luna on 29 September 2008, to critical acclaim. He released a seven-disc box set entitled "Time Capsule" in 2011.

In 2015 Anderson wrote and performed "Aeolian Arietta", a track on Beta Band co-founder John Maclean's feature film debut, Slow West.

In 2016 Anderson co-produced Malcolm Middleton's first solo album in seven years, Summer of '13.

== Personal life ==
He is the brother of Kenny Anderson, aka King Creosote. Both Anderson brothers were members of the fledgling Fence Collective, along with a young KT Tunstall, who lived with Gordon Anderson for a time. He is the acknowledged subject of KT Tunstall's song "Funnyman" (Drastic Fantastic, 2007).

== Discography ==
- Moses (1997), Fence
- 28 Secret Tracks (2000), Fence
- Auckley Craw (2000), Fence
- Touched by Tomoko EP (2001), Bad Jazz/Fence
- Rocks EP (2001), Bad Jazz/Fence - split with James Yorkston & the Athletes
- Concubine Rice (2002), Fence/Domino
- Schoozzzmmii (2004) The Whizz Kiddzz Records
- "Alienoid Starmonica" (2006) The Aliens, EMI
- "Astronomy For Dogs" (2007) The Aliens, EMI
- "Luna" (2008) The Aliens, Petrock Records
- "Time Capsule 001-010" (7-CD Boxset 2011), Domino
