= Champion Versions =

EP by the Beta Band
- Released: 25 July 1997
- Genres: Trip hop, indie rock
- Length: 22:36
- Label: Regal
- Producer: The Beta Band

The Beta Band chronology
| Champion Versions (1997) | The Patty Patty Sound (1998) |

Champion Versions is the debut extended play by the Beta Band, released on 25 July 1997. The EP of songs featured on the original demo tape the band had sent to Phil Brown, an A&R rep for EMI, which landed the group a record deal with Regal Records. It was later included in its entirety on the 1998 compilation The Three E.P.'s, along with The Patty Patty Sound and Los Amigos del Beta Bandidos. It is the sole Beta Band work to feature founding members Gordon Anderson and Steve Duffield, who both left shortly before its release.

"Dry the Rain" was prominently featured in a scene from the 2000 film High Fidelity, in which record store owner Rob Gordon (John Cusack) tells his co-workers that he would sell five copies of The Three E.P.'s by playing the song for the customers in his store; real-life sales of the album reportedly quadrupled in the month after the film's release. "Dry the Rain" has since appeared in the TV series Reacher and Chilling Adventures of Sabrina, and is considered the band's signature song. In 2010, it was ranked #57 by Pitchfork Media in their list of the Top 200 Songs of the 1990s.

== Track listing ==
Side A:

1. "Dry the Rain" – 6:05
2. "I Know" – 3:58

Side B:

1. "B + A" – 6:35
2. "Dogs Got a Bone" – 5:58
