= Alienoid Starmonica =

2006 EP by the Aliens

EP by The Aliens
- Released: 8 May 2006
- Recorded: The Cave, Forest Cafe, Edinburgh
- Genre: Rock, Psychedelic, Funk
- Length: 23:54
- Label: Pet Rock Records, EMI
- Producer: The Aliens

The Aliens chronology
| Alienoid Starmonica (2006) | Astronomy For Dogs (2007) |

Professional ratings
Review scores
| Source | Rating |
|---|---|
| Guardian Unlimited | (favorable) |

Alienoid Starmonica was the first release for The Aliens, a band hailing from Fife, Scotland. It is an EP, released on 8 May 2006.

== Background ==
The Aliens formed from remnants of The Beta Band in 2005, reuniting Robin Jones and John Maclean with Gordon Anderson (a.k.a. Lone Pigeon). This, their first release, reworks some songs from earlier Lone Pigeon releases as well as including some new material.

The track "Robot Man" is also included in their debut studio album Astronomy for Dogs.

== Track listing ==
All tracks except "Hey Leanne" by Gordon Anderson and The Aliens.

1. "Hey Leanne" (written by Gordon Anderson)
2. "Only Waiting"
3. "Robot Man"
4. "Ionas (Look For Space)"

== Personnel ==
- Gordon Anderson – vocals, guitar, piano, synths, Hammond organ ("Only Waiting")
- Robin Jones – drums, percussion
- John Maclean – keyboard, Hammond organ ("Robot Man"), bass

=== Additional ===
- EEn Anderson – pedal steel guitar, double bass ("Hey Leanne")
- Scruffy the Dog – barks ("Hey Leanne")
- Marbles (the Cat) – purrs ("Hey Leanne")
- John Williamson – end bass ("Robot Man"), Hammond organ ("Ionas (Look For Space)"

=== Production ===
- Recorded by John Williamson
- Produced by The Aliens
- Mixed by Guy Fixson

== Notes ==
The song "Hey Leanne" is wordplay on 'Alien'. The track is heavily psychedelic, phasing and using many strange noises and borrowing from other pieces, notably Music of the Crucifixion.

"Robot Man" is included on Astronomy for Dogs twice, once as it is and once in the form of "Rox", a slower, synth-laden version.
