= The Three E.P.'s =

Compilation album by the Beta Band
- Released: 28 September 1998
- Recorded: 1997–1998
- Genres: Folk rock; electronic; post-rock; experimental rock
- Length: 78:12
- Label: Regal
- Producers: The Beta Band; Chris Allison

The Beta Band chronology
Los Amigos del Beta Bandidos (1998)	The Three E.P.'s (1998)	The Beta Band (1999)

The Three E.P.'s is a compilation album of the first three EPs by Scottish musical group the Beta Band, comprising Champion Versions, The Patty Patty Sound and Los Amigos del Beta Bandidos. The album was released on 28 September 1998 in the United Kingdom by Regal and on 26 January 1999 in the United States by Astralwerks. Its cover art includes the icons from each EP.

The Three E.P.'s was prominently featured in a scene from the 2000 film High Fidelity, in which record store owner Rob Gordon (John Cusack) tells his co-workers that he would sell five copies of the album, and plays "Dry the Rain" in his store for his customers. Astralwerks, the band's American label, reported that sales of The Three E.P.'s had quadrupled within a month of the film's March 2000 release.

Frontman Steve Mason later reflected on the album: "At the time, I just thought this is the way all music should be made. I hated the people who were just in bands; who the fuck wants to be in a band with a guitarist and a bassist and a lead singer? All this Britpop shit had been rammed down everyone's throats. Honesty and experimentation were our weapons of choice."

== Critical reception ==
Professional ratings
Review scores
Source	Rating
AllMusic	4.5/5 stars
Entertainment Weekly	A−
The Guardian	3/5 stars
Los Angeles Times	3.5/4 stars
NME	8/10
Pitchfork	8.4/10
Record Collector	5/5 stars
Rolling Stone	3.5/5 stars
The Rolling Stone Album Guide	4/5 stars
Uncut	8/10

In 2000, Q magazine placed The Three E.P.'s at number 74 in its list of the 100 Greatest British Albums Ever. Pitchfork placed the album at number 23 in its list of the Top 100 Albums of the 1990s.

== Track listing ==
Champion Versions
No.	Title	Length
1.	"Dry the Rain"	6:05
2.	"I Know"	3:58
3.	"B + A"	6:35
4.	"Dogs Got a Bone"	5:58

The Patty Patty Sound
No.	Title	Length
5.	"Inner Meet Me"	6:20
6.	"The House Song"	7:15
7.	"Monolith"	15:48
8.	"She's the One"	8:21

Los Amigos del Beta Bandidos
No.	Title	Length
9.	"Push It Out"	5:22
10.	"It's Over"	3:50
11.	"Dr. Baker"	4:08
12.	"Needles in My Eyes"	4:32
Total length:		78:12

== Charts ==
Chart (1998)	Peak position
Scottish Albums (Official Charts)	38
UK Albums (Official Charts)	35
UK Independent Albums (Official Charts)	4

Chart (2026)	Peak position
Australian Albums (ARIA)	62
