= The Beta Band =

Scottish musical group

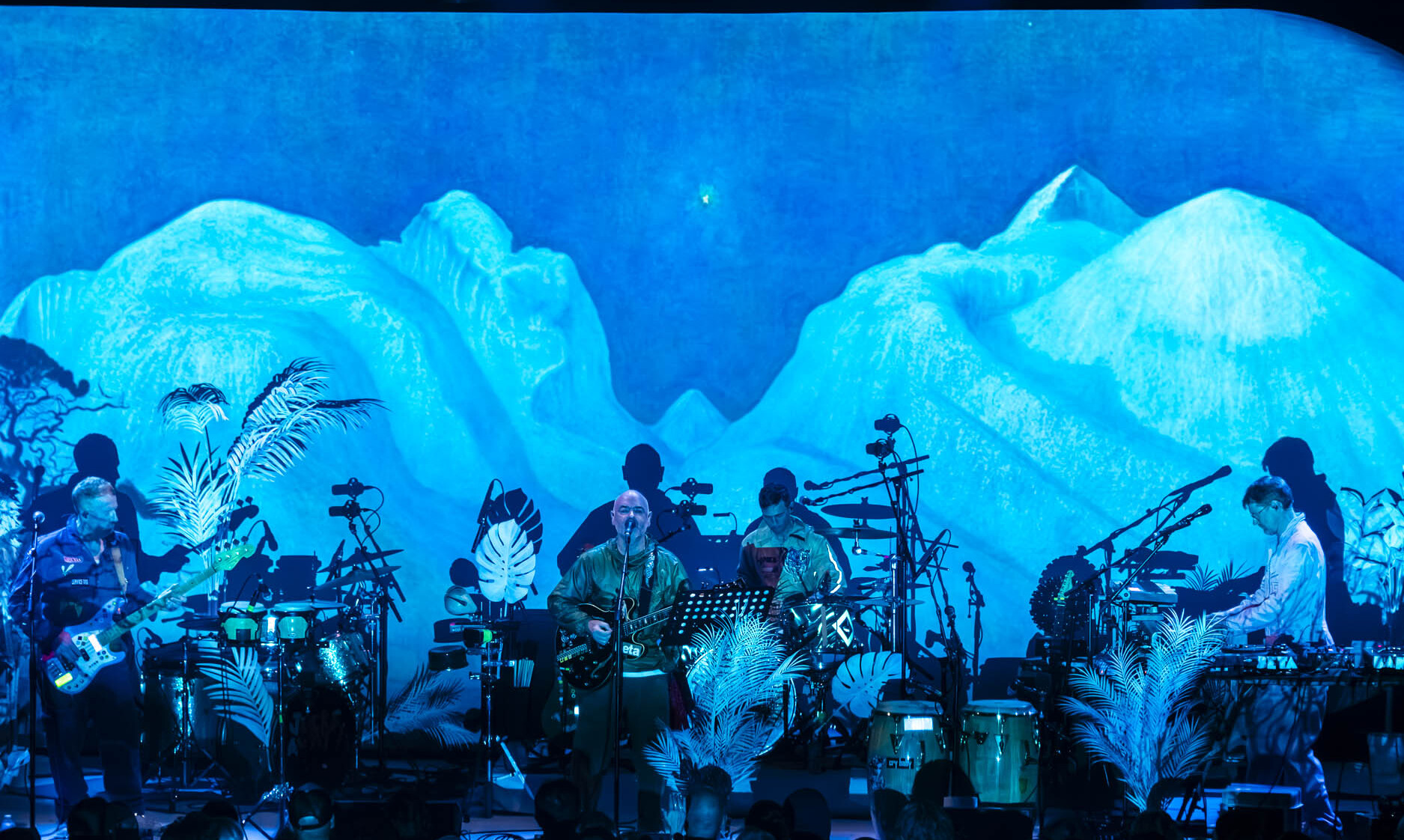
- The band performing in London, 2025. L-R: Greentree, Mason, Jones, Maclean

Background information
- Origin: St Andrews, Fife, Scotland
- Genres: Indie rock; post-rock; psychedelia; trip hop
- Years active: 1996–2004, 2025–present
- Labels: Regal; Because
- Spinoffs: The Aliens
- Members: Richard Greentree; Robin Jones; John Maclean; Steve Mason
- Past members: Gordon Anderson; Steve Duffield

The Beta Band are a Scottish musical group formed in 1996, currently consisting of Steve Mason (vocals, guitar), Robin Jones (drums), John Maclean (keyboard, samples) and Richard Greentree (bass). Their style is described as being a blend of folk, psychedelia, electronica, post-rock and trip hop, often involving stylistic experimentation and occasional humour. They were praised by members of both Radiohead and Oasis, the former of which chose them to open for their concerts in 2001.

After disbanding in 2004 due to financial difficulties, Jones and Maclean joined former bandmate Gordon Anderson to form spin-off band the Aliens; Mason worked in other music projects before embarking on a solo career. The band later reformed in 2025 to tour Britain and the United States.

== History ==
=== Formation ===
The Beta Band was formed in 1996 by St Andrews musicians Steve Mason (vocals, guitar) and Gordon Anderson. The two had plans to call their group The Pigeons but later changed their minds. As they pulled together songs for their debut EP, Champion Versions, they added Robin Jones (drums), John Maclean (DJ, sampler, keyboards), and Steve Duffield (bass). While living in a flat in Shepherd's Bush they met Phil Brown, who after hearing their demo took it to Miles Leonard, who promptly signed the band. Duffield quit the band soon after recording Champion Versions. Not long after they were signed to Regal/Parlophone, Anderson became ill and quit the band. He later produced recordings under the name Lone Pigeon. The remaining members added Englishman Richard Greentree to play bass and solidified their lineup.

=== The Three E.P.'s ===
Champion Versions was released in July 1997 to critical acclaim, not only for the music but also for the record's innovative cut-and-paste sleeve design (the work of John Maclean). The trumpet solos recorded for "Dry the Rain" on Champion Versions were played by Jonathan Levien, credited as Jon Levien on the record. Levien was attending the Royal College of Art in 1997 where he met John Maclean in the Art Bar and mentioned that he could make some interesting whale sounds on his trumpet. Levien was invited to Chalk Farm recording studios shortly afterwards where he was asked to play three riffs on his trumpet for "Dry the Rain". To commemorate the E.P.'s release, the band played their first gig at the Water Rats venue on July 23, 1997.

Two further EPs followed in 1998 produced by Chris Allison and the band: The Patty Patty Sound in March and Los Amigos del Beta Bandidos in July. All three EPs received critical praise, and all three appeared on the appropriately titled The Three E.P.'s collection in September 1998. The compilation was rated by Pitchfork in the Top 10 Albums of the year. The song "Dr Baker" featured on the soundtrack of the first series of Trigger Happy TV.

=== The Beta Band ===
Despite inner conflict, the band commenced work on their first album recording after being signed to Regal. The record, titled The Beta Band, was released in June 1999. The album was more stylistically diverse than the initial EPs, and was loose and unrefined in comparison to their prior style of production. The mixed press turned decidedly negative when the band announced their own disdain for the record, including Mason who declared that it was "fucking awful": Regal's deadline and tight budgets kept them, they stated, from refining their improvisations into coherent songs, and led to an album that was conceptually incomplete. Also in June that year the band made a four-stop tour in the United States.

The band returned to the studio to record the double A-side single "To You Alone"/"Sequinsizer", recorded by future The Go! Team producer, Gareth Parton. It was released on 24 January 2000. The single was received favourably and was regarded as a return to form for the band. The NME made it their "Single of the Week", and would later select it as one of the 50 greatest singles of 2000 in their end-of-year awards. "To You Alone" was also included on the soundtrack of the 2000 remake of the television series Randall and Hopkirk (Deceased), released in March.

=== Hot Shots II ===
A hiatus followed, during which Mason released his second King Biscuit Time EP. The band gradually gravitated back into the studio, this time recruiting UK producer Colin Emmanuel, aka C-Swing, to oversee the process. The album, Hot Shots II, appeared in mid-2001, and was warmly received by critics and fans. It sacrificed much of the first album's experimentation for more boiled-down pop structure and hooks. The band had originally intended to release "Squares" (b/w "Won"), which featured a sample from the Günter Kallmann Choir's 1970 version of Wallace Collection's "Daydream", as the lead single. A video had been filmed and promo discs issued, but because another single ("Daydream in Blue" by I Monster) featuring a sample from the same Günter Kallmann Choir recording was to be released at around the same time, the band opted to release "Broke" instead. A performance on Top Of The Pops for "Broke" had been recorded, but was dropped and has never been shown.

Two other singles were released from the album: "Human Being" in October 2001 and "Squares" in February 2002 (with the I Monster track long out of the charts). The band embarked on a long tour to support the album, at one point supporting Radiohead. In August 2002, they made Number 3 on Q magazine's list of "50 Bands to See Before You Die".

=== Heroes to Zeros and split ===
The band began demo sessions for their third studio album in September 2002. They entered the studio with producer Tom Rothrock in 2003 and completed a number of tracks; however, neither the band nor Regal's executives were pleased with the results. Producer Nigel Godrich was recruited to mix the album, which was completed in early 2004. Lead single "Assessment" was released on 12 April 2004, followed by the album Heroes to Zeros on 26 April. One of the tracks, "Liquid Bird" is based on a sample of "Painted Bird" by Siouxsie and the Banshees. A second single, "Out-Side", followed in July. The band announced their breakup on their website on 2 August 2004, citing financial discord with their label, to whom they owed £1.2 million. In November, they performed at the Summer Sundae festival and set out on a farewell tour. Their final show was at Edinburgh's Liquid Rooms venue on 5 December 2004.

On 3 October 2005, the band released a 2-disc DVD set, The Best of The Beta Band - Film, featuring most of the band's videos and a selection of short films, television footage, documentaries as well as four songs recorded live at the Shepherd's Bush Empire on 29 November 2004, one of the band's final performances. Also released on the same day was a two CD set, The Best of The Beta Band - Music, comprising a compilation disc of studio recordings and a disc containing the Shepherd's Bush gig.

After the band's breakup, Steve Mason began a solo career, releasing music with his solo project King Biscuit Time, as well as new projects Black Affair and Good Face. Robin Jones and John Maclean joined become the Aliens alongside former Beta Band member Gordon Anderson.

On 29 September 2017, Because Music agreed to acquire the Beta Band's back catalogue from Warner Music Group, along with two EPs by Mason's King Biscuit Time project. The reissue campaign launched throughout late 2018.

=== Recent activity ===
In February 2025, the Beta Band refreshed their social media presence, sharing a link to a new mailing list stating that they would "be in touch". A few days later, a video entitled A Bent Bed Hat was posted, hinting at possible reactivity.

On 3 March 2025, the band confirmed their reunion and announced a tour for the UK and North America performing The Three E.P.'s in its entirety, their first live dates in over 20 years.

== Discography ==
The Beta Band discography
- Studio albums: 3
- EPs: 3
- Compilation albums: 3
- Singles: 6
- Video albums: 1

The Beta Band's discography consists of three studio albums, three extended plays, three compilation albums, six singles and a video collection.

Studio albums

- The Beta Band (1999)
- Hot Shots II (2001)
- Heroes to Zeros (2004)

Compilation albums

- The Three E.P.'s (1998)
- The Best of The Beta Band (2005)
- The Regal Years (1997–2004) (2013)

Extended plays

- Champion Versions (1997)
- The Patty Patty Sound (1998)
- Los Amigos del Beta Bandidos (1998)

Singles

- "To You Alone"/"Sequinsizer" (January 2000)
- "Broke"/"Won" (July 2001) (UK No. 30)
- "Human Being" (October 2001) (UK No. 57)
- "Squares" (February 2002) (UK No. 42)
- "Assessment" (April 2004) (UK No. 31)
- "Out-Side" (July 2004) (UK No. 54)

Video

- The Best of The Beta Band (DVD, 2005)
