= The Best of the Beta Band =

Greatest hits album by The Beta Band
- Released: 3 October 2005
- Recorded: 1997–2004
- Genres: Folk rock, psychedelic rock, trip hop, various
- Label: Regal
- Producers: The Beta Band, Colin "C-Swing" Emmanuel

The Beta Band chronology
Heroes to Zeros (2004)	The Best of the Beta Band (2005)	The Regal Years (2013)

Professional ratings
Review scores
Source	Rating
Allmusic	4.5/5 stars
NME	(favourable)
Pitchfork Media	(7.2/10)
PopMatters	(7/10)
Robert Christgau	C+
Rock City	5/5 stars
Stylus	B+
The Times	4/5 stars

The Best of the Beta Band - Music and The Best of the Beta Band - Film are retrospective best of collections by The Beta Band, on CD and DVD respectively, released on 3 October 2005. The cover artwork combines elements from the covers of each of the three EPs and three albums released by the band in its seven-year lifespan.

== Music track listing ==
=== CD one ===
The best of the studio recordings, as selected by the band

1. "Dry the Rain"
2. "Inner Meet Me"
3. "She’s the One"
4. "Dr. Baker"
5. "It’s Not Too Beautiful"
6. "Smiling" (edit)
7. "To You Alone"
8. "Squares"
9. "Human Being" (radio edit)
10. "Gone"
11. "Broke" (radio edit)
12. "Assessment" (radio edit)
13. "Easy"
14. "Wonderful"
15. "Troubles"
16. "Simple"

=== CD two ===
Live at Shepherd's Bush Empire, 30 November 2004

1. "It's Not Too Beautiful"
2. "Squares"
3. "Inner Meet Me"
4. "Simple"
5. "She’s the One"
6. "Easy"
7. "Dr. Baker"
8. "Dry the Rain"
9. "Quiet"
10. "Broke"
11. "Assessment"
12. "Dog's Got a Bone"
13. "The House Song"

== Film ==
The Best of the Beta Band
- Starring: The Beta Band
- Release date: 2005
- Language: English

=== Trailers ===
1. "Chalk and Cheese"
  - Directed by John Maclean
2. "King Rib"
  - Directed by Pete Rankin, Steve Mason
3. "Highland Fidelity"
  - Directed by John Maclean
4. "Old Jock Radio"
  - Directed by Pete Rankin

=== Videos ===
1. "Inner Meet Me"
  - Directed by John Maclean
2. "Los Amigos Del Beta Bandidos"
  - Directed by The Beta Band
3. "Dance O'er The Border"
  - Directed by John Maclean
4. "Smiling"
  - Directed by Mark Szaszy and Corinne Day
5. "Brokenupadingdong"
  - Directed by Josh Eve
6. "Squares"
  - Directed by John Maclean
7. "Al Sharp"
  - Directed by John Maclean
8. "Assessment"
  - Directed by John Maclean and Robin Jones
9. "Lion Thief"
  - Directed by Andrew Cranston
10. "Wonderful"
  - Directed by Nina Chakrabarti
11. "Trouble"
  - Directed by John Maclean
12. "Out-Side"
  - Directed by Robin Jones and John Maclean
13. "Rhododendron"
  - Created by Robin Jones
14. "Country Bird"
  - Directed by Steve Mason and Pete Rankin
15. "Simple"
  - By Andrew Keller
16. "Weirds Way"
  - Directed by Steve Mason and Pete Rankin
17. "Remote Troubles"
  - Directed by John Maclean and Robin Jones

=== Documentaries ===
- The Depot To Monte Cristo
  - Directed by Sam Tyler
- 1997–2004
  - Directed by John Maclean
- Let It Beta
  - Directed by Pete Rankin

=== Live at the Shepherd's Bush Empire ===
Live at Shepherd's Bush Empire, 29 November 2004

1. "Inner Meet Me"
2. "Dry the Rain"
3. "Broke"
4. "Assessment"
