= Hot Shots II =

Studio album by The Beta Band
- Released: 16 July 2001
- Genre: Electronic; rock
- Length: 45:56
- Label: Regal; Astralwerks
- Producer: The Beta Band; Colin Emmanuel

The Beta Band chronology
The Beta Band (1999)	Hot Shots II (2001)	Heroes to Zeros (2004)

Singles from Hot Shots II
- 1. "Square" Released: 2002

Hot Shots II is the second studio album by Scottish musical group The Beta Band, released on 16 July 2001 by Regal Records. Colin "C-Swing" Emmanuel and the band co-produced the album. The band's previous work had used dense experimentation but Hot Shots II had a minimal style influenced by R&B, hip hop and electronica.

Mason later said the album was "us doing what we promised to do and making something completely incredible, that didn't sound like anything else. Nothing else that's ever come after it has ever sounded like it. It's got good, fleshed out and complete songs on it."

== Critical reception ==
Professional ratings
Aggregate scores
Source	Rating
Metacritic	77/100
Review scores
Source	Rating
AllMusic	4.5/5 stars
Entertainment Weekly	B+
The Guardian	3/5 stars
Muzik	4/5
NME	8/10
Pitchfork	8.6/10
Q	4/5 stars
Rolling Stone	3/5 stars
Spin	7/10
Uncut	8/10

Pitchfork placed Hot Shots II at number 118 on its list of top 200 albums of the 2000s. The album is also included in the 2010 edition of 1001 Albums You Must Hear Before You Die. Kludge ranked it at number 1 on its list of top 10 albums of 2001.

== Track listing ==
All tracks are written by The Beta Band, except where noted.

No.	Title	Writer(s)	Length
1.	"Squares"	The Beta Band; David Mackay; Sylveer Van Holmen; Raymond Vincent	3:46
2.	"Al Sharp"		3:34
3.	"Human Being"	The Beta Band; Carole King; Toni Stern	4:31
4.	"Gone"		3:41
5.	"Dragon"	The Beta Band; Egol L. Frauenberger; Carlos Diernhammer	4:56
6.	"Broke"		4:40
7.	"Quiet"		4:49
8.	"Alleged"		5:31
9.	"Life"		3:51
10.	"Eclipse"		6:37
Total length:			45:56

Japanese / US edition bonus track
No.	Title	Writer(s)	Length
11.	"Won"	The Beta Band; Harry Nilsson	5:57
Total length:			51:53

== Charts ==
Chart (2001)	Peak position
Scottish Albums (Official Charts)	11
UK Albums (Official Charts)	13
UK Independent Albums (Official Charts)	1
US Billboard 200	200
US Heatseekers Albums (Billboard)	14
US Independent Albums (Billboard)	11

== Release history ==
Region	Date	Label	Format	Catalogue
Japan	7 July 2001	Toshiba EMI	CD	TOCP 65723
United Kingdom	16 July 2001	Regal Zonophone Records	CD	REG59CD
United States	17 July 2001	Astralwerks	CD	ASW 10446
