= Astronomy for Dogs =

Studio album by The Aliens
- Released: 19 March 2007
- Genre: Rock, Psychedelic, Funk
- Length: 72:03
- Label: Pet Rock Records, EMI
- Producer: The Aliens

The Aliens chronology
Alienoid Starmonica (2006)	Astronomy for Dogs (2007)	Luna (2008)

Singles from Astronomy for Dogs
- 1. "The Happy Song" Released: 18 September 2006; 2. "Setting Sun" Released: 5 March 2007; 3. "Robot Man" Released: 25 June 2007

Professional ratings
Aggregate scores
Source	Rating
Metacritic	73/100
Review scores
Source	Rating
AllMusic	4.5/5 stars
The Guardian	4/5 stars
NME	3.5/5 stars
Yahoo! Music UK	4/5 stars

Astronomy for Dogs is the debut album of Scottish band The Aliens, released on 19 March 2007. It received generally positive reviews.

== Track listing ==
0. "Roswell" (Pregap) (03:30)

1. "Setting Sun" (5:12)
2. "Robot Man" (3:52)
3. "I Am the Unknown" (5:28)
4. "Tomorrow" (5:47)
5. "Rox" (6:15)
6. "Only Waiting" (5:24)
7. "She Don't Love Me No More" (7:13)
8. "Glover" (8:22)
9. "Honest Again" (4:15)
10. "The Happy Song" (3:57)
11. "Caravan" (includes hidden track comprising piano from "She Don't Love Me No More" and vocals from "Honest Again") (16:21)

All songs written by Lone Pigeon aka Gordon Anderson

== Personnel ==
- Gordon Anderson – guitars, lead and backing vocals, piano, synthesizer, accordion, harmonica, string arrangements
- John MacLean – piano, lead and backing vocals, Hammond organ, synthesizer, bass, Melodica, percussion
- Robin Jones – drums, lead and backing vocals, synthesizer, percussion

Additional musicians

- Joanna Foster – vocals (track 5)
- Jamie Dargie – bass (tracks 1, 3–5, 7–11)
- John Williamson – bass (track 2)
- Elysian Quartet – strings (tracks 7, 9)
- Kevin Davy – trumpet and flugelhorn (tracks 5, 7, 9)
