= Steve Mason (musician) =

Scottish musician

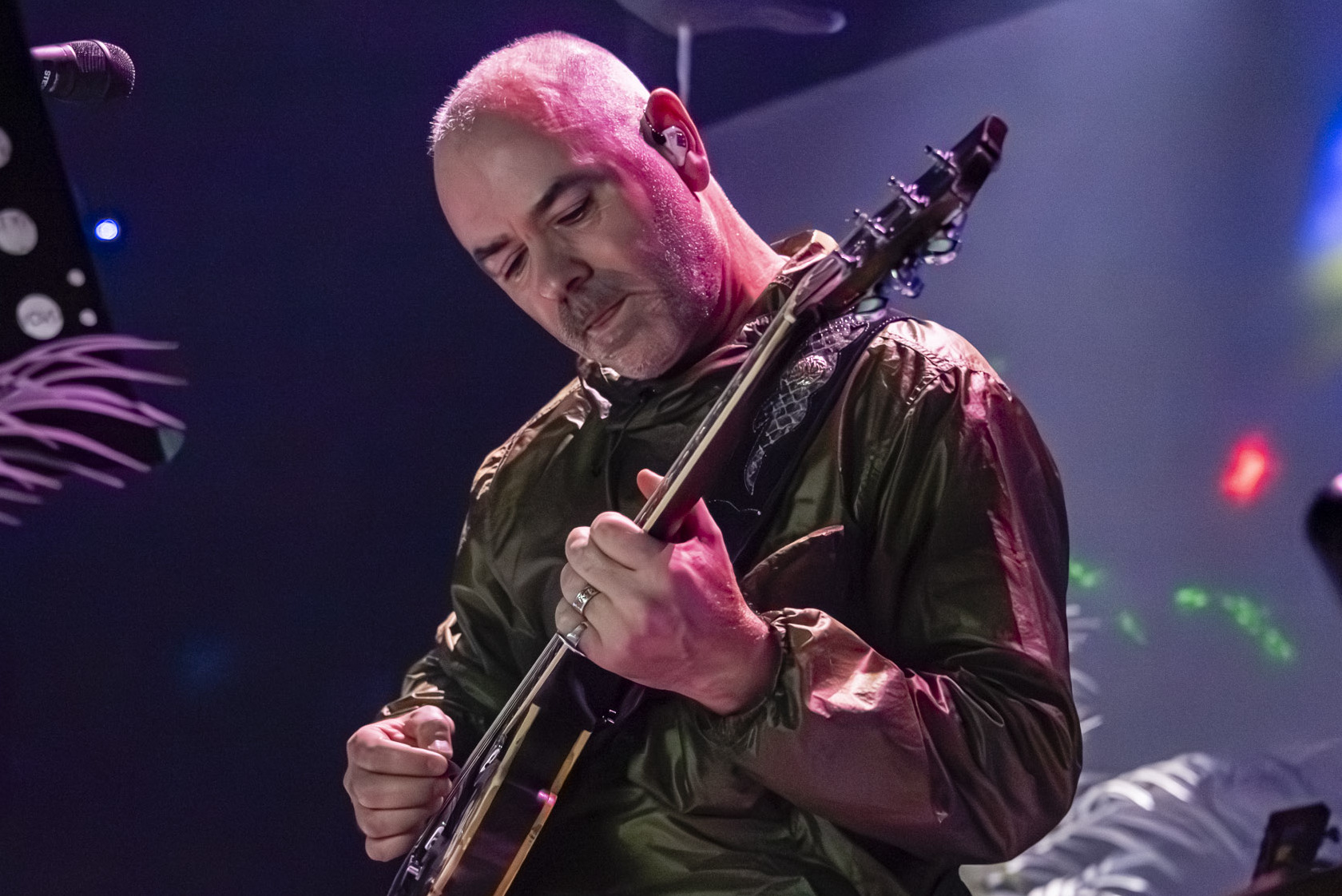
- Mason performing with the Beta Band, 2025

Background information
- Born: 17 April 1975 (age 51); Lanark, Scotland
- Origin: Kirkcaldy, Fife, Scotland
- Genres: Folk, electronic, rock, trip hop, experimental jamming
- Years active: 1996–present
- Labels: Regal, Poptones, V2, Double Six
- Member of: The Beta Band
- Formerly of: Black Affair
- Website: stevemasontheartist.com

Steven Mason (born 17 April 1975) is a Scottish guitarist, singer, writer, and activist. He came to prominence in the late 1990s as the lead singer and one of the founding members of the Beta Band. Mason created King Biscuit Time as a side project during his time in the Beta Band and continued after the group split in 2004; after another brief side project as part of Black Affair, he began his solo career in 2009.

Mason has since released five solo albums in addition to collaborations with Denis Bovell and Martin Duffy. He rejoined the Beta Band as lead singer after their 2025 revival.

== Early life ==
Steven Mason was born in Lanark on 17 April 1975 and grew up on a new-build estate in Kirkcaldy, Fife, Scotland. He had worked as a mechanic prior to forming the Beta Band with Gordon Anderson in 1996.

== Career ==
=== The Beta Band and King Biscuit Time (1996–2004) ===
Mason started his music career as the lead singer and one of the founding members of the Beta Band, formed in 1996. The band released four albums, and gained international notoriety when they were referenced in the film of Nick Hornby’s High Fidelity when John Cusack’s character states he can sell five copies of "The Three EP's" by The Beta Band. The track he selects to achieve this is "Dry the Rain". Astralwerks, the band’s US label stated sales quadrupled after the release of the film. During the group’s time together, Mason was one of the first artists to speak of his depression openly. In late 2004, after a short farewell tour, they split.

During the Beta Band era, Steve appeared on TV shows, including The Adam & Joe Show (2001) and Never Mind the Buzzcocks (2005).

Mason released solo material as King Biscuit Time, including two EPs on Regal Records during The Beta Band's existence. 2000’s No Style EP was described by NME as “wonderfully erratic ambles into crisp electronica, soft strumming, sleepy beats and his doleful singing about love, virtue, surviving and being comfortably glum". After The Beta Band split in 2004, Mason released one album as King Biscuit Time, Black Gold, on No Style Records, an imprint of Alan McGee's Poptones record label. Mason announced the end of King Biscuit Time before the album's release, and cancelled a subsequent tour, posting on his website “Peace to you all, I’m out of here. It’s been amazing but I’ve had enough. Over and out. Steve xxx.” The Guardian called Black Gold a “vital, dolorous treasure” and that Mason’s “creative well seems bottomless.” Pitchfork said although it was “a melancholy record”, it could listen to “Mason's creaky, lonely voice all day.” Black Gold was one of the first CDs to be released in bio-degradable packaging and Mason self-released the 2-LP version of the album, in a limited edition of 150.

=== Black Affair (2008) ===
Mason has also worked under the name Black Affair, and has released one album under this pseudonym on V2 Records. Paul Lester wrote in The Guardian that Black Affair “reek of: old school R&B, electro, early hip-hop, Chicago house, Detroit techno, even the pristine white synth-pop that influenced all of the previous black artists in the first place – poptronic forgemasters such as Kraftwerk, Yazoo, the Human League, Depeche Mode, Soft Cell and New Order". Their sole album, Pleasure Pressure Point, was released in 2008 to positive reviews. The Boston Phoenix stated “sensitive indie man boy breaks up cult band, goes clubbing, is sexed up by shady ladies, feels somewhere between good-bad and bad-bad, tells the world about it, repeat".

=== Solo career (2009–present) ===
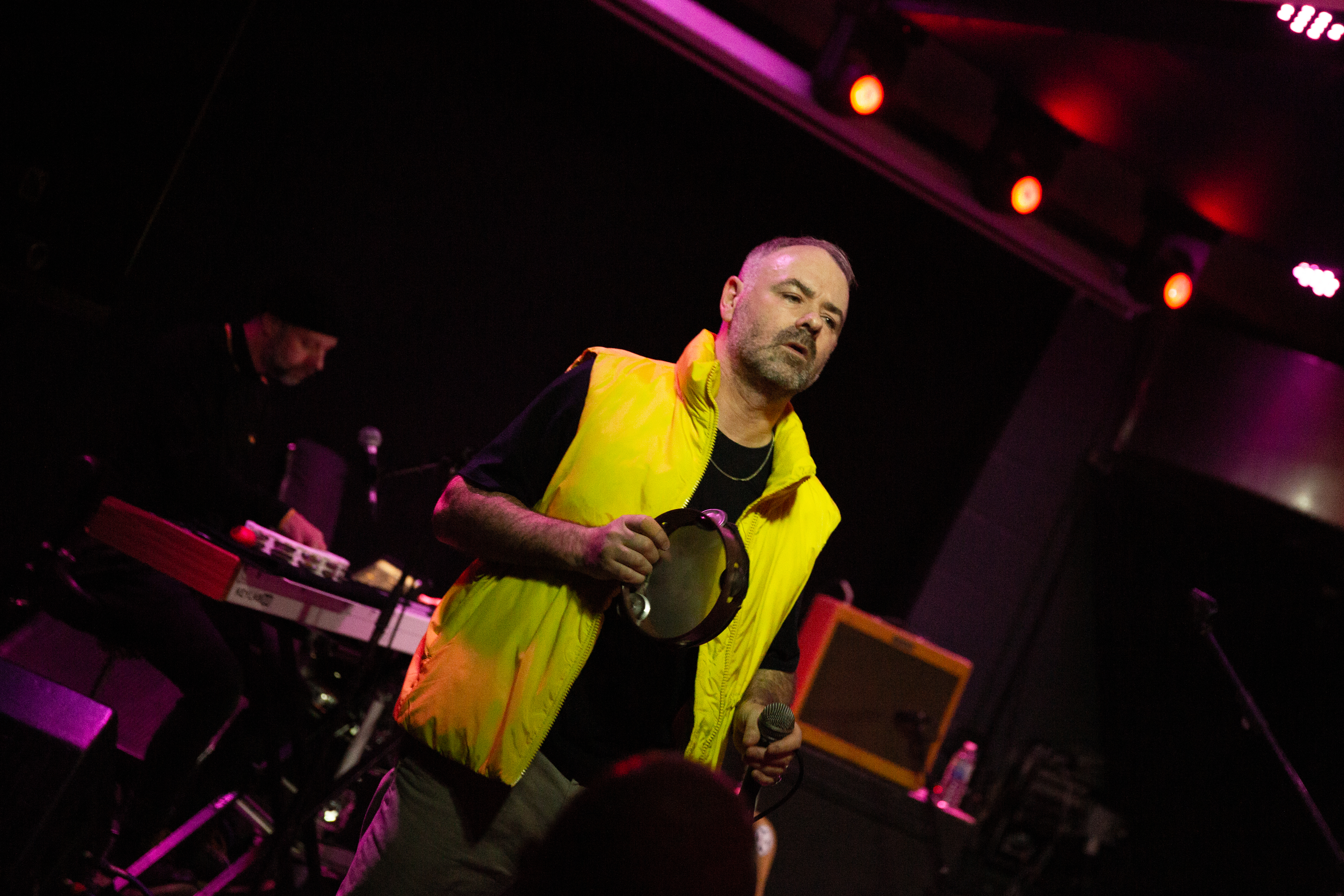
Mason in Hull, 2022

On 19 April 2009, The Sunday Times reported that Mason was working on a new album with the record producer Richard X. This album, Boys Outside, was released in March 2010 and is the first album under Mason's own name. The first single, "All Come Down", was released as a download at the end of November 2009. Q gave the album a 4/5 rating. According to Rob Fearn, the album "relocates Mason in a grand tradition of indie boys doing idiosyncratic electronic pop, a line stretching back through Hot Chip, New Order, Talk Talk and Brian Eno". Fearn argued that the album, "totally different from what he did in King Biscuit Time and Black Affair", might be seen as a "welcome return to a stripped-down songcraft". It is "...not just a work that can finally measure up to [Beta Band's] The Three EPs, but is a sign of a "bold new start", according to the critic. Record Collector added retrospectively that “Boys Outside was one of 2010’s very best albums. Steve Mason had finally faced his personal demons and was able, after years of hiding behind pseudonyms, to . . . deliver a solo album of touching sincerity, equal to any high-period Beta Band". In 2011, Mason issued a dub version of the album, Ghosts Outside, in collaboration with Dennis Bovell. Record Collector said that by “adding his reverb-laden studio trickery, it’s as if Bovell has delved deeper into Mason’s soul and created a perfect standalone piece".

In 2013, Mason released Monkey Minds in the Devil's Time. The album covers topics as diverse as his recent struggles with depression and loneliness, the suicide of David Kelly (former weapons inspector in Iraq) and the London riots. It received positive reviews: The Quietus suggested “If Mason’s last album Boys Outside was a window on his struggles with mental ill-health, Monkey Minds… moves from micro to macro as he harnesses his strong sense of social justice, while continuing to hone the crisp electronics that so perfectly soundtrack his ghostly, exhortatory vocals". The Independent called it "his most rewarding release since the Beta Band"; Record Collector stated it was “An attack on the lack of dissenting voices in popular culture, if this isn’t Mason’s bona fide masterpiece, it’s certainly approaching it”. To support the album, Mason played several UK dates as well as selected UK, Europe and Canadian festivals. Remixes of album tracks “Seen It All Before” and “Come To Me” by Greg Wilson and Derek Kaye were issued on 12” for Record Store Day 2014.

In 2023, Mason released Brothers & Sisters. The album was recorded during lockdown, in 2020. It steps away from his "radio-friendly" style of 2019’s About The Light, marrying electronic elements with world music. Tom Doyle at Mojo singled out the title track as “a rallying cry to dormant ravers,” and concluded that the album was “a winning beats-driven combination of the personal and the universal.” Daryl Easlea at Record Collector noted that this may well be Mason’s friend and collaborator Martin Duffy’s final appearance on record (after his passing in December 2022) – “a fine way for him to finish, on an album full of intelligence and love.” Nick Roseblade said in Clash Magazine that Brothers & Sisters was “one of his best albums to date." A ten-date UK tour to support the album runs April/May 2023.

== Discography ==
=== The Beta Band ===
see The Beta Band Discography

=== King Biscuit Time ===
==== EPs ====
- Sings Nelly Foggits Blues in "Me and the Pharaohs" (7 December 1998, Regal)
  1. "Fatheriver" (3:07)
  2. "Niggling Discrepancy" (3:46)
  3. "Little White" (2:39)
  4. "Eye o' the Dug" (2:02)
- No Style (19 June 2000, Regal)
  1. "I Walk the Earth" (5:52)
  2. "Untitled" (2:12)
  3. "I Love You" (3:05)
  4. "Time to Get Up" (3:47)
  - The US release of No Style also included the entirety of the Nelly Foggits Blues EP.

==== Singles ====
- "C I AM 15" (26 September 2005, Poptones) – reached No. 67 on the UK Singles Chart
  - CD
  1. "C I AM 15" (featuring Topcat)
  2. "People Happy"
  - 7" (1)
  1. "C I AM 15" (featuring Topcat)
  2. "C I AM 15 (C-Swing Remix)"
  - 7" (2)
  1. "C I AM 15" (featuring Topcat)
  2. "C I AM 15 C I AM 15 (mix by Junior Mason Mumbazza)"
- "Kwangchow" (24 April 2006, Poptones) – reached No. 84 on the singles chart
  - CD
  1. "Kwangchow"
  2. "Tears Dry"
  3. "Kwangchow (Doctors of Love Remix)"
  4. "Kwangchow (Suicide D.O.G.Z.- Faudels Hash Den Remix)"
  - 7"
  1. "Kwangchow"
  2. "Tears Dry"

==== Albums ====
- Black Gold (15 May 2006, Poptones) – reached No. 143 on the UK Albums Chart
  1. "C I AM 15"
  2. "Izzum"
  3. "Impossible Ride"
  4. "Kwangchow"
  5. "Lefteye"
  6. "All Over You"
  7. "The Way You Walk"
  8. "Paperhead"
  9. "Rising Son"
  10. "Metal Biscuit"

=== Black Affair ===
==== Singles ====
- "Tak! Attack!" (22 October 2007, V2)
  - 12"
  1. "Tak! Attack!"
  2. "Blush"
  3. "Tak! Attack! (Suicidedogz remix)"
- "It's Real" (16 June 2008, V2)
  - 12"
  1. "It's Real (Jimmy Edgar mix)"
  2. "Fingerability (Stephen Mason mix)"
  3. "It's Real (Jimmy Edgar mix – Playgroup remix)"
- "Japanese Happening" (6 October 2008, V2)
  - Download
  1. "Japanese Happening"
  2. "Night Watch"
  3. "You and Me (C90's Remix)"
  4. "Japanese Happening (Movestar Star Moving Remix)"

==== Albums ====
- Pleasure Pressure Point (4 August 2008, V2)
  1. "P.P.P."
  2. "It Goes Like This"
  3. "Just Keep Walking"
  4. "It's Real"
  5. "Japanese Happening"
  6. "You and Me"
  7. "Reel to Reel"
  8. "Subfuge"
  9. "Will She Come"
  10. "Sweet"
  11. "Tak! Attack!"
  12. "Mute Me"
  13. "Pills"

=== Steve Mason ===
==== Singles ====
- "All Come Down" (23 November 2009, Black Melody)
  - Download
  1. "All Come Down"
  2. "All Come Down (Drums of Death Carnival of Souls remix)"
  3. "All Come Down (Drums of Death Carnival of Souls dub)"
- "Lost & Found" (19 April 2010, Double Six)<
  - Download
  1. "Lost & Found"
  2. "It's Never You"
- "Am I Just a Man" (16 August 2010, Double Six)
  - 12"
  1. "Am I Just a Man"
  2. "Am I Just a Man (Studio remix)"
  3. "Am I Just a Man (Alexis Taylor remix)"
- "Fight Them Back" (12 December 2012, Double Six)
  - Digital
  1. "Fight Them Back"

==== Studio albums ====
- Boys Outside (3 May 2010, Double Six – UK chart peak: No. 82)
  1. "Understand My Heart"
  2. "Am I Just a Man"
  3. "The Letter"
  4. "Yesterday"
  5. "Lost & Found"
  6. "I Let Her In"
  7. "Stress Position"
  8. "All Come Down"
  9. "Boys Outside"
  10. "Hound on My Heel"
- Ghosts Outside (2011), with Dennis Bovell (UK chart peak: No. 194)
- Monkey Minds In The Devil's Time (11 March 2013, Double Six – UK chart peak: No. 34)
  1. "The Old Problem"
  2. "Lie Awake"
  3. "Flyover '98"
  4. "A Lot of Love"
  5. "The Last of Heroes"
  6. "Lonely"
  7. "Safe Population"
  8. "Friends For Ever More"
  9. "Seen It All Before"
  10. "From Hate We Hope"
  11. "Oh My Lord"
  12. "Goodbye Youth"
  13. "Never Be Alone"
  14. "Behind The Curtains"
  15. "More Money, More Fire"
  16. "Fire!"
  17. "Operation Mason"
  18. "Fight Them Back"
  19. "Towers of Power"
  20. "Come To Me"
- Meet The Humans (26 February 2016, Double Six – UK chart peak: No. 28)
  1. "Water Bored"
  2. "Alive"
  3. "Alright"
  4. "Another Day"
  5. "Run Away"
  6. "To A Door"
  7. "Hardly Go Through"
  8. "Through My Window"
  9. "Planet Sizes"
  10. "Like Water"
  11. "Words In My Head"
- About the Light (18 January 2019, Domino)
  1. "America Is Your Boyfriend"
  2. "Rocket"
  3. "No Clue"
  4. "About the Light"
  5. "Fox on the Rooftop"
  6. "Stars Around My Heart"
  7. "Spanish Brigade"
  8. "Don't Know Where"
  9. "Walking Away from Love"
  10. "The End"
- Brothers & Sisters (3 March 2023, Domino)
  1. "Mars Man"
  2. "I'm on My Way"
  3. "No More" (Featuring Javed Bashir)
  4. "All Over Again"
  5. "The People Say"
  6. "Let It Go"
  7. "Pieces of Me"
  8. "Travelling Hard"
  9. "Brixton Fish Fry" (Featuring Javed Bashir)
  10. "Upon My Soul"
  11. "Brothers & Sisters"
