= Luna (The Aliens album) =

Studio album by The Aliens
- Released: 29 September 2008
- Genre: Psychedelic rock, experimental pop
- Label: Pet Rock
- Producer: The Aliens

The Aliens chronology
Astronomy For Dogs (2007)	Luna (2008)

Professional ratings
Aggregate scores
Source	Rating
Metacritic	65/100
Review scores
Source	Rating
The Guardian	3/5 stars
The Independent	3/5 stars
NME	8/10 stars
The Observer	4/5 stars
Pitchfork Media	(5.6/10)
The Skinny	3/5 stars
The Times	4/5 stars

Luna is the second album by the Scottish band The Aliens. It was released on Monday 29 September 2008, preceded by a new single, 'Magic Man', on Monday 22 September. Both releases came out on the band’s own record label, Pet Rock Records. "Boats" is reworked version of a song by the same name on the Lone Pigeon 2004 album Schoozzzmmii. Besides being more hi-fi, the Alien's arrangement is also more filled out (3 minutes longer) and slightly more up tempo.

== Track listing ==
1. "Bobby’s Song" (10:26)
2. "Amen" (1:18)
3. "Theremin" (3:16)
4. "Everyone" (4:09)
5. "Magic Man" (5:18)
6. "Billy Jack" (10:25)
7. "Luna" (3:35)
8. "Dove Returning" (3:12)
9. "Sunlamp Show" (4:53)
10. "Smoggy Bog" (1:54)
11. "Daffodils" (3:21)
12. "Boats" (6:17)
13. "Blue Mantle" (8:12)

All songs written by Lone Pigeon a.k.a. Gordon Anderson
