= The Patty Patty Sound =

EP by the Beta Band
- Released: 2 March 1998
- Genre: Indie rock
- Length: 37:44
- Label: Regal
- Producer: Chris Allison; The Beta Band

The Beta Band chronology
| Champion Versions (1997) | The Patty Patty Sound (1998) | Los Amigos del Beta Bandidos (1998) |

The Patty Patty Sound is the second extended play by The Beta Band, released on 2 March 1998. Despite a length nearing 40 minutes and being originally released on two 12" records, the work is still considered an extended play by both the band and the press. All the tracks from the EP were later included on the compilation The Three E.P.'s along with Champion Versions and Los Amigos del Beta Bandidos.

"The Monolith" is titled simply "Monolith" on The Three E.P.'s; additionally, the track features a manipulated sample of "Dry the Rain" from Champion Versions.

== Track listing ==
Side A:

1. "Inner Meet Me" - 6:20
2. "The House Song" - 7:15

Side B:

1. "The Monolith" - 15:48
2. "She's the One" - 8:21

== Charts ==
Chart performance for The Patty Patty Sound
| Chart (1998) | Peak position |
|---|---|
| UK Independent Albums (OCC) | 7 |
| Scottish Albums (OCC) | 59 |
