= Los Amigos del Beta Bandidos =

EP by the Beta Band
- Released: 20 July 1998
- Genre: Indie rock
- Length: 17:52
- Label: Regal
- Producer: Chris Allison; The Beta Band

The Beta Band chronology
The Patty Patty Sound (1998)	Los Amigos del Beta Bandidos (1998)	The Three E.P.'s (1998)

Los Amigos del Beta Bandidos (English: Friends of the Beta Bandits) is the third extended play by Scottish musical group the Beta Band, released in July 1998. All tracks from the EP were later included on the compilation album The Three E.P.'s; along with previous extended plays Champion Versions and The Patty Patty Sound.

== Track listing ==
Side A:

1. "Push It Out" - 5:22
2. "It's Over" - 3:50

Side B:

1. "Dr. Baker" - 4:08
2. "Needles in My Eyes" - 4:32
