= Chvrches discography =

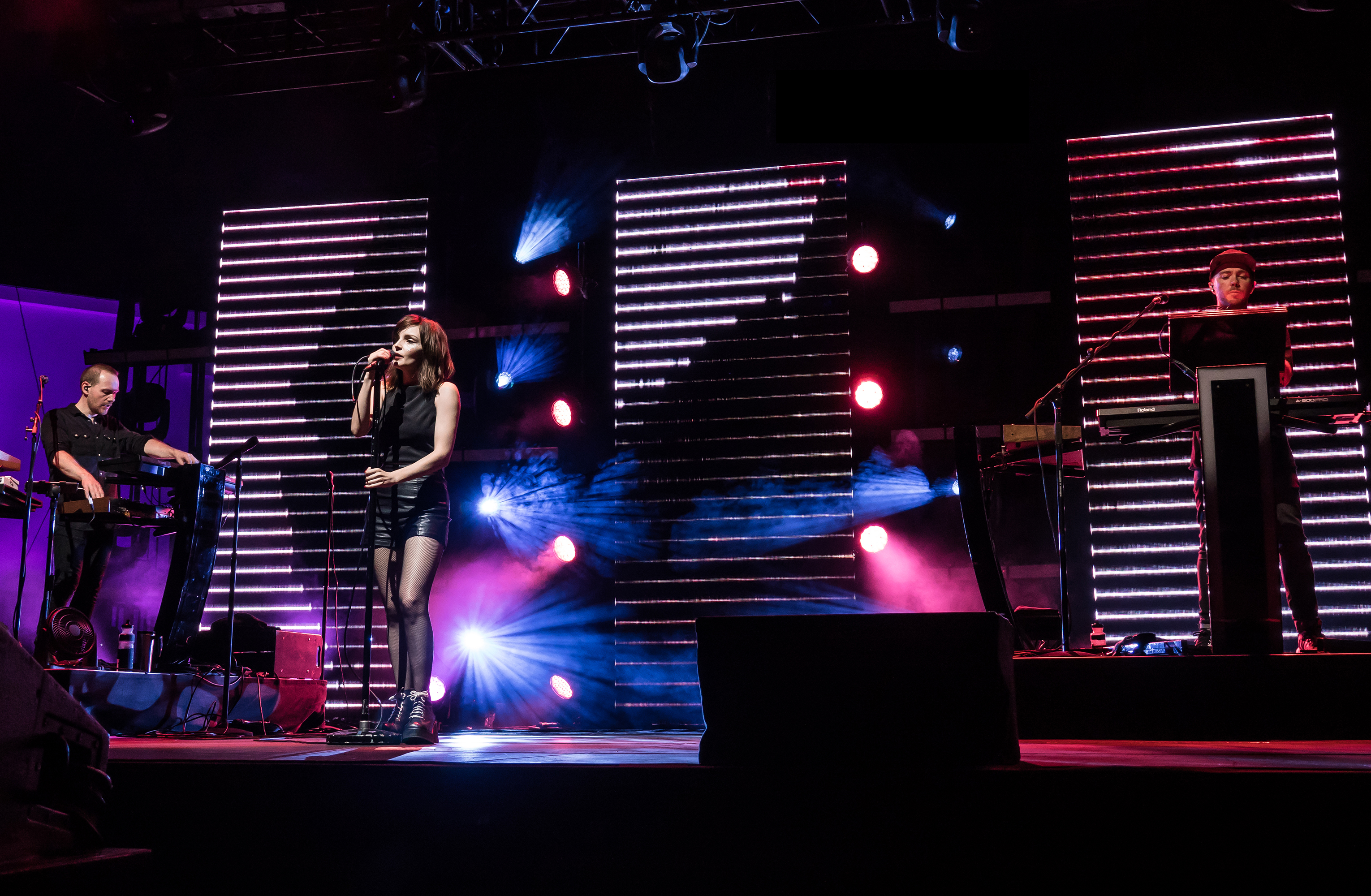
- Chvrches performing in Los Angeles in 2016
- Studio albums: 4
- EPs: 4
- Singles: 22
- Music videos: 19
- Promotional singles: 2
- Covers: 6
- Remixes: 6

Scottish synth-pop band Chvrches have released four studio albums, three extended plays (EPs), 22 singles, two promotional singles and 19 music videos. Chvrches was formed in Glasgow in 2011 and consists of Lauren Mayberry (lead vocals, additional synthesisers, samplers), Iain Cook (synthesisers, guitar, bass, vocals), and Martin Doherty (synthesisers, samplers, vocals).

Chvrches came fifth on the BBC's Sound of 2013 list of the most promising new music talent. In March 2013, they released Recover EP. Their debut studio album The Bones of What You Believe was released on 20 September 2013.

== Studio albums ==
List of studio albums, with selected chart positions and certifications
| Title | Details | Peak chart positions | | | | | | | | | | Certifications |
| Title | Details | SCO | AUS | CAN | GER | IRE | JPN | NL | NZ | UK | US | Certifications |
|---|---|---|---|---|---|---|---|---|---|---|---|---|
| The Bones of What You Believe | Released: 23 September 2013 (UK); Label: Virgin, Goodbye; Formats: CD, LP, digital download | 5 | 13 | 19 | 22 | 12 | 59 | 68 | 35 | 9 | 12 | BPI: Gold |
| Every Open Eye | Released: 25 September 2015 (UK); Label: Virgin EMI, Goodbye; Formats: CD, LP, digital download | 1 | 3 | 11 | 20 | 4 | 53 | 33 | 10 | 4 | 8 | BPI: Gold |
| Love Is Dead | Released: 25 May 2018; Label: Virgin EMI, Goodbye; Formats: CD, LP, digital download, cassette | 5 | 7 | 22 | 16 | 15 | 45 | 88 | 35 | 7 | 11 | BPI: Silver |
| Screen Violence | Released: 27 August 2021; Label: EMI, Glassnote; Formats: CD, LP, digital download, cassette | 1 | 6 | 74 | 15 | 23 | 65 | 91 | — | 4 | 31 | |
| All the King's Men | Scheduled: 22 January 2027; Label: Futures | To be released | | | | | | | | | | |
"—" denotes a recording that did not chart or was not released in that territory.

== Extended plays ==
| Title | Details |
|---|---|
| Recover EP | Released: 25 March 2013 (UK); Label: Goodbye; Formats: 12" vinyl, digital download |
| EP | Released: 10 July 2013 (JP); Label: Hostess; Formats: CD, digital download |
| Under the Tide EP | Released: 28 November 2014 (UK); Label: Goodbye; Format: 12" vinyl |
| Hansa Session | Acoustic performance accompanied by a string quartet; Released: 16 November 2018; Label: Glassnote Records; Format: 10" vinyl, digital download |
| In Search of Darkness | Fan selected compilation + "Death Stranding"; Released: 19 March 2021; Label: Glassnote Records; Format: digital download |

== Singles ==
=== As lead artist ===
List of singles, with selected chart positions and certifications, showing year released and album name
| Title | Year | Peak chart positions | | | | | | | | | | Certifications | Album |
| Title | Year | UK | SCO | AUS | BEL (FL) Tip | CAN Rock | CZR | GER | JPN | MEX | US Rock | Certifications | Album |
|---|---|---|---|---|---|---|---|---|---|---|---|---|---|
| "The Mother We Share" | 2012 | 38 | 34 | — | 9 | 49 | — | 63 | 6 | — | 30 | BPI: Gold; ARIA: Gold; MC: Gold; RIAA: Gold | The Bones of What You Believe |
| "Recover" | 2013 | 91 | 64 | 84 | 43 | — | — | 55 | — | — | — | ARIA: Gold | The Bones of What You Believe |
| "Gun" | 2013 | 55 | 45 | — (Note: "Gun" did not enter the Australian ARIA Singles Chart but peaked at number five on the ARIA Hitseekers Chart.) | 11 | — | — | — | 82 | — | — | | The Bones of What You Believe |
| "Lies" | 2013 | 105 | — | — (Note: "Lies" did not enter the Australian ARIA Singles Chart but peaked at number 19 on the ARIA Hitseekers Chart.) | 27 | — | — | — | — | — | — | | The Bones of What You Believe |
| "We Sink" | 2014 | — (Note: "We Sink" did not enter the UK Singles Chart, but peaked at number 26 on the UK Physical Singles Chart.) | — | — | — | — | — | — | — | — | — | | The Bones of What You Believe |
| "Under the Tide" | 2014 | — | — | — | — | — | — | — | — | — | — | | The Bones of What You Believe |
| "Get Away" | 2014 | 52 | 24 | — (Note: "Get Away" did not enter the Australian ARIA Singles Chart but peaked at number five on the ARIA Hitseekers Chart.) | — | — | — | — | — (Note: "Get Away" did not enter the Billboard Japan Hot 100 chart, but peaked at number 49 on the Billboard Japan Radio Songs chart.) | — | 45 | | Non-album singles |
| "Tether" (vs. Eric Prydz) | 2015 | 107 | 41 | — | 33 | — | — | — | — | — | — | | Non-album singles |
| "Leave a Trace" | 2015 | 108 | 49 | 64 | 37 | 27 | — | — | 95 | — | 17 | ARIA: Gold | Every Open Eye (and extended edition) |
| "Never Ending Circles" | 2015 | 157 | 61 | — | — | — | — | — | — | — | 35 | | Every Open Eye (and extended edition) |
| "Clearest Blue" | 2015 | 195 | 64 | — (Note: "Clearest Blue" did not enter the Australian ARIA Singles Chart but peaked at number eight on the ARIA Hitseekers Chart.) | — | — | — | — | 74 | — | 43 | ARIA: Gold | Every Open Eye (and extended edition) |
| "Empty Threat" | 2015 | — | — | — | 79 | — | — | — | — | — | — | | Every Open Eye (and extended edition) |
| "Warning Call" | 2016 | — | — | — | — | — | — | — | — (Note: "Warning Call" did not enter the Billboard Japan Hot 100 chart, but peaked at number 51 on the Billboard Japan Radio Songs chart.) | — | — | | Every Open Eye (and extended edition) |
| "Bury It" (featuring Hayley Williams) | 2016 | — | 93 | — | — | — | — | — | — (Note: The original album version of "Bury It" (without Hayley Williams) did not enter the Billboard Japan Hot 100 chart, but peaked at number 46 on the Billboard Japan Radio Songs chart.) | 49 | 32 | | Every Open Eye (and extended edition) |
| "Get Out" | 2018 | 82 | 62 | — | — | 48 | — | — | — (Note: "Get Out" did not enter the Billboard Japan Hot 100 chart, but peaked at number 10 on the Billboard Japan Hot Overseas chart.) | — (Note: "Get Out" did not enter the Mexico Airplay chart, but peaked at number 21 on the Mexico Ingles Airplay chart.) | 17 | | Love Is Dead |
| "My Enemy" (featuring Matt Berninger) | 2018 | — | 96 | — | — | — | — | — | — | — | 28 | | Love Is Dead |
| "Never Say Die" | 2018 | — | — | — | — | — | — | — | — | — (Note: "Never Say Die" did not enter the Mexico Airplay chart, but peaked at number 23 on the Mexico Ingles Airplay chart.) | 41 | | Love Is Dead |
| "Miracle" | 2018 | — (Note: "Miracle" did not enter the UK Singles Chart, but peaked at number 86 on the UK Singles Downloads Chart.) | 61 | — (Note: "Miracle" did not enter the Australian ARIA Singles Chart but peaked at number 47 on the ARIA Digital Track Chart.) | — | — | — | — | — | — (Note: "Miracle" did not enter the Mexico Airplay chart, but peaked at number 19 on the Mexico Ingles Airplay chart.) | 29 | ARIA: Gold | Love Is Dead |
| "Death Stranding" | 2019 | — | 92 | — | — | — | — | — | — | — | 47 | | Death Stranding: Timefall |
| "He Said She Said" | 2021 | — (Note: "He Said She Said" did not enter the UK Singles Chart, but peaked at number 63 on the UK Singles Downloads Chart.) | × | — | — (Note: "He Said She Said" did not enter the Flanders Ultratop Top 50, but charted as an extra tip on the Flanders Ultratop Bubbling Under chart.) | — | 53 | — | — (Note: "He Said She Said" did not enter the Billboard Japan Hot 100 chart, but peaked at number 18 on the Billboard Japan Hot Overseas chart.) | — (Note: "He Said She Said" did not enter the Mexico Airplay chart, but peaked at number 22 on the Mexico Ingles Airplay chart.) | 37 | | Screen Violence |
| "How Not to Drown" (with Robert Smith) | 2021 | — (Note: "How Not to Drown" did not enter the UK Singles Chart, but peaked at number 55 on the UK Singles Downloads Chart.) | × | — | — | — | — | — | — | — | — | | Screen Violence |
| "Good Girls" | 2021 | — | × | — | — | — | — | — | — | — | — | | Screen Violence |
| "Over" | 2023 | — (Note: "Over" did not enter the UK Singles Chart, but peaked at number 28 on the UK Singles Sales Chart.) | × | — | — | — | — | — | — (Note: "Over" did not enter the Billboard Japan Hot 100 chart, but peaked at number 6 on the Billboard Japan Hot Overseas chart.) | — | — (Note: "Over" did not enter the Hot Rock & Alternative Songs chart, but peaked at number 32 on the Rock & Alternative Airplay chart.) | | Non-album single |
| "Manhattan" | 2023 | — | × | — | — | — | — | — | — | — | — | | The Bones of What You Believe (10 year anniversary edition) |
| "Addicted to Love" | 2026 | — | × | — | — | — | — | — | — | — | — | | Tell Me Lies (TV series) |
| "Such Great Heights" | 2026 | — | × | — | — | — | — | — | — | — | — | | Tell Me Lies (TV series) |
| "Roses" | 2026 | — (Note: "Roses" did not enter the UK Singles Chart, but peaked at number 70 on the UK Singles Sales Chart.) | × | — | — | — | — | — | — | — | — (Note: "Roses" did not enter the Hot Rock & Alternative Songs chart, but peaked at number 29 on the Alternative Airplay chart.) | | All the King's Men |
"—" denotes a recording that did not chart or was not released in that territory. "×" denotes periods where charts did not exist, were not archived, or are not yet available

=== As featured artist ===
List of singles as featured artist, showing year released, and album name
| Title | Year | Peak chart positions | | | | | | | | | | Certifications | Album |
| Title | Year | UK | SCO | AUS | BEL (FL) | CAN | GER | IRE | JPN | MEX | US | Certifications | Album |
|---|---|---|---|---|---|---|---|---|---|---|---|---|---|
| "Here with Me" (Marshmello featuring Chvrches) | 2019 | 9 | 11 | 9 | 20 | 15 | 49 | 10 | 50 | 44 | 31 | BPI: Platinum; ARIA: Platinum; BVMI: Gold; RIAA: 2× Platinum; RIAJ: Silver (st.); IFPI DK: Gold; MC: Platinum | Non-album single |

=== Promotional singles ===
List of promotional singles, showing year released, and album name
| Title | Year | Album |
|---|---|---|
| "Bela Lugosi's Dead" | 2014 | Vampire Academy (Music From the Motion Picture) |
| "Make Them Gold" | 2015 | Every Open Eye |
| "Out of My Head" (featuring Wednesday Campanella) | 2018 | Love Is Dead: Japan Deluxe Edition |

== Other charted songs ==
List of other charted songs, with selected chart positions, showing year released and album name
| Title | Year | Peak chart positions | | | | | | Album |
| Title | Year | UK | SCO | AUS | MEX | US Alt | US Rock | Album |
|---|---|---|---|---|---|---|---|---|
| "Dead Air" | 2014 | — | 82 | 94 | — | — (Note: "Dead Air" did not enter the US Alternative Airplay chart, but peaked at number 17 on the Alternative Digital Songs chart.) | 24 | The Hunger Games: Mockingjay, Part 1 (soundtrack) |
| "Graffiti" | 2018 | — | — | — | — (Note: "Graffiti" did not enter the Mexico Airplay chart, but peaked at number 47 on the Mexico Ingles Airplay chart.) | — | — | Love Is Dead |
| "Forever" | 2018 | — | — | — | — (Note: "Forever" did not enter the Mexico Airplay chart, but peaked at number 17 on the Mexico Ingles Airplay chart.) | 30 | — | Love Is Dead |
| "Killer" | 2021 | — (Note: "Killer" did not enter the UK Singles Chart, but peaked at number 67 on the UK Singles Downloads Chart.) | × | — | — | — | — | Screen Violence |
| "Screaming" | 2021 | — (Note: "Screaming" did not enter the UK Singles Chart, but peaked at number 82 on the UK Singles Downloads Chart.) | × | — | — | — | — | Screen Violence |
| "Bitter End" | 2021 | — (Note: "Killer" did not enter the UK Singles Chart, but peaked at number 87 on the UK Singles Downloads Chart.) | × | — | — | — | — | Screen Violence |
"—" denotes a recording that did not chart or was not released in that territory. "×" denotes periods where charts did not exist or were not archived

== Covers ==
List of covers by Chvrches of other artists, showing year released
| Title | Year | Artist |
|---|---|---|
| "Tightrope" | 2013 | Janelle Monáe |
| "Do I Wanna Know?" | 2014 | Arctic Monkeys |
| "Cry Me a River" | 2015 | Justin Timberlake |
| "Call It Off" | 2017 | Tegan and Sara |
| "Stay" | 2018 | Rihanna |
| "Love" | 2018 | Kendrick Lamar |
| "XO" | 2018 | Beyoncé |
| "The Killing Moon" | 2021 | Echo & the Bunnymen |
| "Cry Little Sister" | 2021 | Gerard McMann |

== Remixes ==
List of remixes by Chvrches for other artists, showing year released
| Title | Year | Artist |
|---|---|---|
| "Gold Dayzz" | 2012 | Ultraísta |
| "Before the Dive" | 2013 | St. Lucia |
| "Hurricane" | 2013 | MS MR |
| "Blud" | 2014 | SOAK |
| "Drugs & the Internet" | 2019 | Lauv |
| "Turning The Bones" | 2021 | John Carpenter |
| "An Arrow in the Wall" | 2023 | Death Cab for Cutie |

== Music videos ==
List of music videos, showing year released and directors
| Title | Year | Director(s) | Ref. |
|---|---|---|---|
| "Recover" | 2013 | Wim Reygaert | |
| "Gun" | 2013 | Pen$acola | |
| "The Mother We Share" | 2013 | Sing J. Lee | |
| "Lies" | 2013 | Sing J. Lee | |
| "Recover (Travelogue)" | 2014 | Sing J. Lee | |
| "We Sink" | 2014 | Sing J. Lee | |
| "Under the Tide" | 2014 | Sing J. Lee | |
| "Leave a Trace" | 2015 | Warren Du Preez and Nick Thornton Jones | |
| "Empty Threat" | 2015 | Austin Peters | |
| "Clearest Blue" | 2016 | Warren Fu | |
| "Bury It" (featuring Hayley Williams) | 2016 | Jamie McKelvie | |
| "Down Side of Me" | 2017 | Kristen Stewart | |
| "Get Out" | 2018 | Unknown | |
| "Miracle" | 2018 | Warren Fu | |
| "Out Of My Head" (ft. Wednesday Campanella) | 2018 | Junichi Yamamoto and Yoshiki Imazu | |
| "Graffiti" | 2018 | Rare Henderson | |
| "Here With Me" (Marshmello ft. CHVRCHES) | 2019 | Karam Gill, Daniel Malikyar | |
| "He Said She Said" | 2021 | Scott Kiernan | |
| "How Not To Drown" (feat. Robert Smith) | 2021 | Scott Kiernan | |
| "Good Girls" | 2021 | Scott Kiernan | |
| "Over" | 2023 | Leah Barylsky | |
| "Evil" | 2026 | Dobermann | |
