= Mayberry (disambiguation) =

Mayberry is a fictional community that was the setting for The Andy Griffith Show and Mayberry R.F.D.

Mayberry may also refer to:

== Places ==
=== Communities ===
- Mayberry, Illinois, an unincorporated community in the United States
- Mayberry, Maryland, an unincorporated community in the United States
- Mayberry, Nebraska, an unincorporated community in the United States
- Mayberry, Virginia, located in Patrick County, Virginia, United States
- Mayberry Township, Hamilton County, Illinois, United States
- Mayberry Township, Pennsylvania, United States
- Mayberry Village, an urban area in Connecticut, United States

=== Other places ===
- Mayberry Mall, Mount Airy, North Carolina, United States
- Mayberry Middle School, Wichita, Kansas, United States
- Mayberry Mound and Village Site, Sims, Illinois, United States
- Mayberry Presbyterian Church, Patrick County, Virginia, United States
- H. G. W. Mayberry House, Franklin, Tennessee, United States
- Henry H. Mayberry House, Franklin, Tennessee, United States

== Media and entertainment ==
- Mayberry (Rascal Flatts song), released in 2003
- Return to Mayberry, a 1986 television movie
- Mayberry R.F.D., television series from 1968 to 1971
- Another Mayberry, album by Big Head Todd and the Monsters

== People ==
- Mayberry (surname), for a list of people with the name

== See also ==
- Mayberry Machiavelli, satirically pejorative phrase coined in 2001
- Maesbury
- Maybury:
  - Maybury, a place in Scotland
  - Maybury (surname)
