= Mayberry (surname) =

Mayberry is a surname of Old English origin. It is a locational name, a dialectical variant of the placename Maesbury in Shropshire.

== List ==
Notable people with the surname include:

- Andy Mayberry (born 1970), American politician
- George Mayberry (1884–1961), Irish track and field athlete
- Des Maybery (1924–2009), South African rower
- George Mayberry (1883–1961), Irish track and field athlete
- John Mayberry (born 1949), American baseball first baseman
- John Mayberry, Jr. (born 1983), American baseball outfielder
- John Penn Mayberry (1939–2016), American philosopher and mathematician
- Jermane Mayberry (born 1973), American football offensive lineman
- Julie Mayberry (born c. 1971), American politician
- Lauren Mayberry (born 1987), Scottish musician
- Lee Mayberry (born 1970), American basketball guard
- Mariann Mayberry (1965–2017), American television and stage actress
- Marty Mayberry (1986–2024), Australian Paralympic alpine skier
- Matt Mayberry (born 1987), American football player
- Russ Mayberry (1925–2012), Scottish-born American television director
- Tony Mayberry (born 1967), American football player
- Walter "Tiger" Mayberry (1915–1944), American football player and fighter pilot
- Dustin Mayberry (born 1984), American police detective in Martinez

== See also ==
- Maberry
