= Hansa Session =

EP by Chvrches
- Released: 16 November 2018
- Studios: Hansa Tonstudio, Berlin
- Genre: Chamber pop
- Length: 18:53
- Label: Glassnote
- Producer: Chvrches

Chvrches chronology
Love Is Dead (2018)	Hansa Session (2018)	Screen Violence (2021)

Hansa Session is the acoustic and string quartet version of five re-imagined tracks from the Love Is Dead album by Scottish synth-pop band Chvrches recorded at the Hansa Tonstudio in Berlin.

Talking about the motivation behind this EP which doesn't bring new material but suggests another point of view of some of their songs, Lauren Mayberry mentioned their interest to "... try and reinterpret the songs and still communicate the messages and emotions with different arrangements ...". Iain Cook, who also wrote the string arrangements for this EP and recorded them at Bad Robot studio in LA, emphasized, on the other hand, the opportunity to be in the same place where some of the artists he admires the most recorded their work.

The Hansa Session EP was released on 16 November 2018 as digital download and on 14 December 2018 as a limited edition 10" vinyl.

== Track listing ==
All tracks are written by Chvrches and Greg Kurstin except track 2 which is written by Chvrches and Steve Mac.

No.	Title	Length
1.	"Graffiti (Hansa Session)"	3:56
2.	"Miracle (Hansa Session)"	3:28
3.	"Get Out (Hansa Session)"	3:49
4.	"Heaven/Hell (Hansa Session)"	4:42
5.	"Really Gone (Hansa Session)"	2:58
Total length:		18:53
