= Fortress Festival =

American music festival

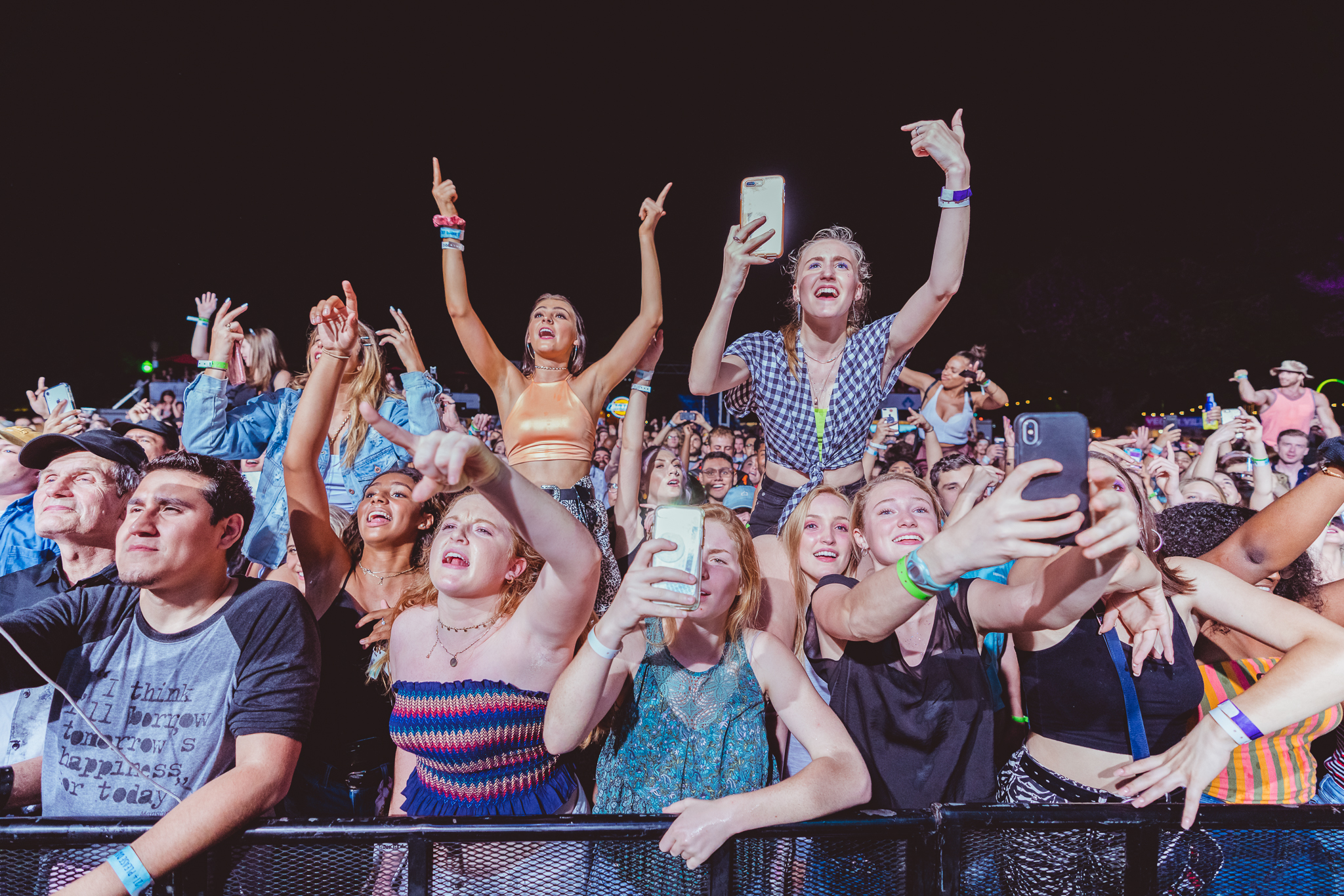
- Fortress Festival 2019
- Genre: Music festival
- Date: April
- Frequency: Annually
- Locations: Cultural District; Fort Worth, Texas, United States
- Years active: 2017–2019
- Most recent: April 27–28, 2019
- Website: www.fortressfestival.com

Fortress Festival was an annual music festival held in the Cultural District of Fort Worth, Texas. The event was held the last weekend in April on the grounds of the Will Rogers Memorial Center, and was produced by Fort Worth-based company Fortress Presents in partnership with the Modern Art Museum of Fort Worth, which also served as one of the event's venues in its first two years.

During its run, Fortress Festival sought to curate an eclectic mix of national, regional and local musical acts that reflect Fort Worth's diverse community and true artistic character. This is represented in lineups that contain a variety of genres, including Indie Rock, Pop, Rap, Hip hop, R&B, Soul, Punk and others. Additionally, Fortress Festival was recognized by the press as part of a small number of festivals worldwide for lineups that include a notable number of female artists across the bill.

On April 10, 2020, festival organizers announced that the event would not be held that year due to the coronavirus pandemic – while announcing that the festival was expected to be continued on April 24-25, 2021 with the majority of the artists in the 2020 lineup. On January 20, 2021, organizers announced the cancellation of that year's event, with hopes to return in 2022, but that plans for a revival never materialized.

== Lineups ==
=== 2017 ===
Headlining acts: Run the Jewels, Purity Ring

Others:

- Flying Lotus
- Slowdive
- Nathaniel Rateliff & the Night Sweats
- Peter Hook and The Light
- Houndmouth
- Wolf Parade
- S U R V I V E
- Alvvays
- Whitney
- Dengue Fever
- Quaker City Night Hawks
- Sam Lao
- Sudie
- Ronnie Heart
- Burning Hotels
- Golden Dawn Arkestra
- Bobby Sessions
- Blue, The Misfit.
- Cure for Paranoia

=== 2018 ===
Headlining acts: Father John Misty, Chromeo

Others:

- Courtney Barnett
- De La Soul
- RZA (featuring Stone Mecca)
- Chicano Batman
- Tune-Yards
- The Voidz
- Rapsody
- Hurray for the Riff Raff
- Waxahatchee
- Shabazz Palaces
- Lee Fields and The Expressions
- Jay Som
- The Texas Gentlemen
- Bedouine
- Vandoliers
- Ronnie Heart
- Cure for Paranoia
- Andy Pickett
- Midnight Opera
- Henry the Archer
- Pearl Earl
- Francine Thirteen
- Juma Spears
- Sammy Kidd (of Mean Motor Scooter)

=== 2019 ===
Headlining acts: Leon Bridges, CHVRCHΞS

Others:

- Rae Sremmurd
- Khruangbin
- Tinashe
- Tank and the Bangas
- Superorganism
- Bobby Sessions
- Abhi the Nomad
- Red Shahan
- The Bright Light Social Hour
- Gio Chamba
- Blackillac
- Sailor Poon
- The Cush
- Solar Slim
- Adrian Stresow
- War Party
- Cardiac the Ghost
- Luna Luna
