= My Enemy (Chvrches song) =

Single by Chvrches featuring Matt Berninger

from the album Love Is Dead
- Released: 28 February 2018
- Genre: Pop; electropop
- Length: 3:53
- Label: Glassnote
- Songwriters: Martin Doherty; Lauren Mayberry; Iain Cook
- Producer: Chvrches

Chvrches singles chronology
"Get Out" (2018)	"My Enemy" (2018)	"Never Say Die" (2018)

"My Enemy" is a song recorded by Scottish synthpop band Chvrches, featuring guest vocals from Matt Berninger of The National. Written and produced by the band, it was released through Glassnote on 28 February 2018, as the second single from their third studio album, Love Is Dead (2018).

== Background and release ==
Matt Berninger made a brief cameo in the music video for the album's lead single "Get Out". On 25 February 2018, "My Enemy" appeared on the music streaming platform Deezer for a short amount of time, as a screenshot of the song playing on Spotify surfaced on the internet. The song was confirmed when the band revealed the album's track list the day after. It premiered on Zane Lowe's Beats 1 radio show as the "World Record" of that day. Chvrches' front woman Lauren Mayberry praised Berninger's work the interview, stating that the band is "huge fans of the National and have been for a long time" and had played a few festivals together. They got to know each other while they were working on the 7 Inches For Planned Parenthood project that Berninger spearheaded. "We kept in touch after that and, when it came time to record 'My Enemy', Iain and Martin suggested I email Matt to see if he'd like to sing on it. We never realistically thought he'd have time to do it but he replied right away and recorded the track at his house the next day."

Multi-instrumentalist Martin Doherty told Pitchfork that he initially sang on the Berninger's verse. "We realized pretty quickly it would lend itself well to the duality of two points of view, once Lauren had come in with the lyric. But when my voice was on the verse, it felt somehow wrong to me. I thought we could make this into something special with someone like Matt, who can sell stories so purely, who sings one word and I'm there. The first time I ever heard 'Fake Empire' from Boxer, I will never fucking forget that."

== Critical reception ==
Bianca Gracie of Fuse complimented Chvrches' ability to "effortlessly express tangible emotions in synth-pop", writing that the song has "a completely different tone" than "Get Out" and "leaves you feeling surprisingly empty, but satisfied enough to give it another play". Scott Russell of Paste sees the song as "another indication that Chvrches are aiming high on their new album, packing more punch than ever in their soaring synth-pop anthems". Brian Haack of Grammy Award praised the song, writing: "The resulting collaboration touches all the right notes of Chvrches trademark sound: it's lyrically lush and sonically layered enough to wow crowds at festival stages, but also packed with hooks and catchy vocal melodies that should play well on radio and streaming platforms."

Lauren O'Neill of Vice wrote: "It's airy, light, and more downbeat than its predecessor, and is especially significant as a different sonic landscape from the sort that we're used to from Berninger, who for the record sounds great here." Hayden Manders of Nylon opined that it is "decidedly more morose than 'Get Out', but cathartic nonetheless". He felt that "the song itself is somber, more in the vein of previous songs like 'Tether' and 'Down Side of Me.'" Robin Murray of Clash regarded it as "a record of both quiet and significant change for the Scottish group", calling it "a brooding, crystalline piece of synth pop" in which "every element feels exactly measured". Will Richards of DIY deemed it "a slower, more contemplative counterpart to the sky-reaching, ballsy 'Get Out'", writing that "Matt and Lauren's voices prove a near-perfect pair". He concluded his review by naming it "the first true example of the trio countering their chorus-driven, synth-pop bangers with something slower but just as affecting".

== Credits and personnel ==
Credit adapted from Tidal.

Performers

- Martin Doherty – composition, production, keyboard
- Lauren Mayberry – composition, production, vocals
- Iain Cook – composition, production, keyboard
- Matt Berninger – vocals

Technical

- Chris Gehringer – master engineering
- Michael Freeman – assistant mixing
- Spike Stent – mixing
- David Simpson – record engineering
- Alex Pasco – record engineering
- Julian Burg – record engineering

== Charts ==
Chart (2018)	Peak position
Scottish Singles Sales (Official Charts)	96
US Hot Rock & Alternative Songs (Billboard)	28
