= Get Out (song) =

Single by Chvrches

from the album Love Is Dead
- Released: 31 January 2018
- Genre: Pop; synth-pop
- Length: 3:51
- Label: Glassnote
- Songwriters: Greg Kurstin; Martin Doherty; Lauren Mayberry; Iain Cook
- Producer: Greg Kurstin

Chvrches singles chronology
| "Bury It" (2016) | "Get Out" (2018) | "My Enemy" (2018) |

Music video
- "Get Out" on YouTube

"Get Out" is a song recorded by Scottish synthpop band Chvrches, co-written and produced by Greg Kurstin, with additional writing from Chvrches themselves—Martin Doherty, Lauren Mayberry and Iain Cook. The song was released commercially for digital download via Glassnote Records on 31 January 2018, as the lead single from Chvrches' third studio album, Love Is Dead (2018).

== Background and release ==
The song was the band's newest release of material, two years after the release of the fifth and final single, "Bury It", from their sophomore album released in September 2015, Every Open Eye.

One day prior, Chvrches wiped all of their social media accounts, before posting a video that features frontwoman Lauren Mayberry drawing a heart on a bathroom mirror using a lipstick and then crossing it out, and was captioned "Get In". It also features a snippet of the song's instrumental, which was listed as "Get Out" if played on Shazam. Mayberry shared the same video to her personal Instagram account, with the hashtag "#CHV3". The song was also teased via Facebook Messenger. A message with the cover art was sent after replying the phrase "Get In". They posted a second teaser the day after, with a caption revealing the premiere on BBC Radio 1 at 7:30 pm.

The song is a collaboration with Grammy-winning producer Greg Kurstin. "Working with Greg was so different to what we'd done before, but it also felt so comfortable and like he'd been in our band forever," the band said in a statement. "He doesn't try to make you write a certain kind of song. He just listens and then Jedi puppet masters the best work out of you. The opening synth riff of 'Get Out' was the first thing to emerge on our first day in the studio with him."

== Critical reception ==
Marc Hogan of Pitchfork opined that the song "manages neither the best of 'big pop' nor does it contain any particular saltiness". Robin Murray of Clash deemed it "a big, massive, enormous, stonking pop record, the sort of thing Chvrches have always threatened to make", calling Mayberry's vocal "a searing, terrifying beast". Phil Witmer of Vice wrote that the song is "amusingly-named and incandescent", praising Mayberry for her "typically soaring choruses", which "have never sounded more emo". NPR's Cyrena Touros named it "the band's most ambitious pop effort to date, all without losing that distinct edge". Scott Russell of Paste regarded the song as "the kind of synth-pop smash that uplifts and intoxicates audiences". Scott T. Sterling of CBS Radio wrote: "The cut adheres pretty closely to the classic Chvrches sound, pairing a heavy synth bass line with an uplifting melodic chorus powered by singer Lauren Mayberry."

== Music video ==
A preview video was released alongside the single. The visual shows a monitor screen made up of a grid of security-style footage from cameras in nine different locations, one of which is the same setting as the first teaser, aside from clips of band members in the studio, traffic outside, and graves being covered with dirt. It also features brief cameos from Kurstin and The National's Matt Berninger, along with a phone number which plays a clip of Lauren Mayberry reading lyrics to the album's next single, "My Enemy", which featured Berninger, upon dialing.

== Track listing ==
Digital download
| No. | Title | Length |
|---|---|---|
| 1. | "Get Out" | 3:51 |

Digital download – remixes
| No. | Title | Length |
|---|---|---|
| 1. | "Get Out" (One Bit remix) | 5:23 |
| 2. | "Get Out" (Roosevelt remix) | 3:07 |

== Credits and personnel ==
Credits adapted from Tidal.

- Iain Cook – songwriting, keyboard
- Martin Doherty – songwriting, keyboard
- Lauren Mayberry – songwriting, vocals
- Greg Kurstin – songwriting, production, keyboard, drums, record engineering
- Chris Gehringer – master engineering
- Michael Freeman – assistant mixing
- Mark "Spike" Stent – mixing
- Alex Pasco – record engineering
- Julian Burg – record engineering

== Charts ==
=== Weekly charts ===
| Chart (2018) | Peak position |
|---|---|
| Canada Rock (Billboard) | 48 |
| Mexico Ingles Airplay (Billboard) | 21 |
| New Zealand Heatseekers (RMNZ) | 10 |
| Scottish Singles Sales (Official Charts) | 56 |
| UK Singles (Official Charts) | 82 |
| US Hot Rock & Alternative Songs (Billboard) | 17 |
| US Rock & Alternative Airplay (Billboard) | 18 |

=== Year-end charts ===
| Chart (2018) | Position |
|---|---|
| US Hot Rock Songs (Billboard) | 87 |

== Release history ==
| Region | Date | Format | Version | Label | Ref. |
|---|---|---|---|---|---|
| United Kingdom | 31 January 2018 | Contemporary hit radio | Original | Glassnote | |
| Various | 31 January 2018 | Digital download | Original | Glassnote | |
| United States | 6 February 2018 | Modern rock | Original | Glassnote | |
| Various | 23 March 2018 | Digital download | Remixes | Glassnote | |
