= List of Olympic competitors from Ireland who represented other countries =

A large number of people from Ireland have competed at the Olympic Games for a country other than Ireland. Given the size of the Irish diaspora, particularly Irish Americans and the Irish migration to Britain, it was common for such emigrants to represent their adopted nations. The first independent Irish team at the Olympics appeared in the 1924 Paris Games, with Irish athletes previously competing for Great Britain.

== Irish Olympians for other nations ==
NB: This list excludes people who identify as Northern Irish and have competed for Great Britain at the Olympics, Northern Ireland being part of the United Kingdom.

- Dan Ahearn
- Tim Ahearne
- Edward Barrett
- John Barrett
- John Beresford
- John Pius Boland
- John Carpenter
- James Clarke
- James Brendan Connolly
- Denis St. George Daly
- John Daly
- Dennis Fenton
- John Flanagan
- Patrick Flynn
- Bryan Fowler
- Johnny Hayes
- Beatrice Hill-Lowe
- Denis Horgan
- Robert Kerr
- Tom Kiely
- Con Leahy
- Patrick Leahy
- Joe Lydon
- Harold Mahony
- George Mayberry
- Ken McArthur
- Pat McDonald
- Matt McGrath
- Joshua Millner
- James Mitchel
- Peter O'Connor
- Con O'Kelly
- James Cecil Parke
- Derek Porter
- Noel Purcell
- Patrick Ryan
- Martin Sheridan
- Con Walsh
