= Never Say Die (Chvrches song) =

2018 Single by Chvrches

Single by Chvrches

from the album Love Is Dead
- Released: 29 March 2018
- Genre: Electro
- Length: 4:23
- Label: Glassnote
- Songwriters: Martin Doherty; Iain Cook; Lauren Mayberry; Greg Kurstin
- Producer: Greg Kurstin

Chvrches singles chronology
"My Enemy" (2018)	"Never Say Die" (2018)	"Miracle" (2018)

"Never Say Die" is a song recorded by Scottish synthpop band Chvrches. Written by the band and its producer Greg Kurstin, it was released by Glassnote Records on 29 March 2018, as the third single from the band's third studio album, Love Is Dead (2018). The song is also featured in the soundtrack of the 2018 video game Forza Horizon 4, playing on the in-game radio station Horizon Pulse.

== Composition ==
"Never Say Die" is a downtempo electro song that "features robust, linear-patterned synths that maintain the song's energy". Despite the band's well-known "airy synths", there is "a more abrasive-sounding synth that leads the charge during the bridge leading into the anthemic chorus", according to Derrick Rossignol of Uproxx. In a statement, Lauren Mayberry said that it is "one of my favorite songs on the record because it really leans into the juxtaposition of what we do—the mixture between the dark and the light", describing it as "melodic and direct but uses some of the gnarliest sounds we've ever tried". "The chorus lyric came about very quickly but the verses took a lot longer. I really wanted to sum up a feeling of trying to be optimistic when you feel disillusioned by the people around you, but trying to keep going because 'Goonies Never Say Die.'"

== Critical reception ==
Tom Breihan of Stereogum wrote that the song leans towards "almost-EDM synth sounds", calling it "a clear attempt to swing at crossover stardom while still keeping the group's personality intact". Similarly, Winston Cook-Wilson of Spin opined that it features "a slinking R&B feel and a complementary, stuttering vocal cadence from Lauren Mayberry" while "retaining the band's typical arena-ready dynamics". Hayden Wright of CBS Radio deemed the song "an intense electro track with Lauren Mayberry's signature pop-friendly vocals". Robin Murray of Clash regarded the song as "a dazzling return" and "a deft fusion of light and shade", driven by Mayberry's powerful vocal and Kurstin's seismic production.

== Credits and personnel ==
Credits adapted from Tidal.

Chvrches

- Martin Doherty – composition, keyboard
- Iain Cook – composition, keyboard
- Lauren Mayberry – composition, vocals

Studio personnel

- Greg Kurstin – composition, production, keyboard, drums, record engineering
- Chris Gehringer – master engineering
- Michael Freeman – mixing assistance
- Spike Stent – mixing
- Julian Burg – record engineering
- Alex Pasco – record engineering

== Charts ==
Chart (2018)	Peak position
Mexico Ingles Airplay (Billboard)	23
US Hot Rock & Alternative Songs (Billboard)	41
