= Miracle (Chvrches song) =

Single from synthpop band Chvrches

Single by Chvrches

from the album Love Is Dead
- Released: 10 April 2018
- Genre: Pop
- Length: 3:08
- Label: Glassnote
- Songwriters: Lauren Mayberry; Iain Cook; Martin Doherty; Steve Mac
- Producers: Chvrches; Steve Mac

Chvrches singles chronology
"Never Say Die" (2018)	"Miracle" (2018)	"Here with Me" (2019)

Music video
- "Miracle" on YouTube

"Miracle" is a song recorded by Scottish synthpop band Chvrches. Written and produced by the band and Steve Mac, it was released by Glassnote Records on 10 April 2018, as the fourth single from the band's third studio album, Love Is Dead (2018).

== Background ==
The song premiered as Annie Mac's Hottest Record on BBC Radio 1, where the band revealed that it is the only song from the album recorded in the United Kingdom. "'Miracle' is the only song from Love Is Dead that we didn't write and record in the States, instead producing it in London with Steve Mac. Steve is such an intuitive writer with such a killer ear for melody and working with him felt very easy and natural. He makes space for everyone in the room and really pushes people to try things and go outside of their comfort zone, in a good way," said Mayberry.

== Composition ==
"Miracle" is a pop song consisting of elements from '90s rock music. According to Rolling Stone's Jon Blistein, the song features "booming percussion cut with laser-like synths" and "an Imagine Dragons-esque drop", with "the production moving between sparse, airy verses and a speaker-rattling chorus". The chorus has also been described as "a faux-EDM breakdown", and it contains a lot of "woahs".

== Critical reception ==
Lauren O'Neill of Vice praised the song's drop which was "blended with enough unexpected elements that it doesn't feel generic", noting the influence of bands like The Cardigans and Garbage. Peter Helman of Stereogum did not notice a huge difference in terms of production despite not being produced by Greg Kurstin, who produced most songs from the album, calling it "another big pop song, with a 'woah' chant and everything".

== Music video ==
A music video was released for the song on 25 April 2018. It was directed by Warren Fu and shot in one take. In it, Mayberry calmly strolls through a foggy, post-apocalyptic setting in slow motion, as she sings the song. She navigates turbulent streets filled with riots, fist fights, and explosions, before reaching a climax in which a glowing blue heart explodes and Mayberry is splattered with blue paint. Mayberry said of the video in a press release: "We're all huge fans of Warren's work and were so excited when he agreed to be the creative director on this. We met him when he directed the video for our song 'Clearest Blue' and it's so cool to see the world you imagined come to life through his work." Michael Love Michael of Paper called it "an extended metaphor for today's times: exploring what it means to look truth in the eye — which can often be chaotic, unpredictable, and uncertain — with a steely, focused gaze, like the buddha watching their thoughts float by in the river, without judgment or fear".

== Credits and personnel ==
Credits adapted from Tidal.

Chvrches

- Lauren Mayberry – composition, production, vocals
- Iain Cook – composition, production, keyboard, bass guitar, background vocals
- Martin Doherty – composition, production, keyboard, background vocals

Additional musician

- Steve Mac – composition, production, keyboard, background vocals

Studio personnel

- Chris Gehringer – master engineering
- Michael Freeman – assistant mixing
- Chris Laws – drums, record engineering
- Spike Stent – mixing
- Dann Pursey – record engineering

== Charts ==
=== Weekly charts ===
Chart (2018)	Peak position
Australia (ARIA Hitseekers)	9
Mexico Ingles Airplay (Billboard)	19
Scottish Singles Sales (Official Charts)	61
UK Singles Downloads (Official Charts)	86
US Hot Rock & Alternative Songs (Billboard)	29
US Rock & Alternative Airplay (Billboard)	22

=== Year-end charts ===
Chart (2018)	Position
US Hot Rock Songs (Billboard)	64
