= All the King's Men (Chvrches album) =

Studio album by Chvrches
- Released: 27 January 2027
- Recorded: Glasgow, Scotland
- Length: 42:59
- Label: Futures

Chvrches chronology
Screen Violence (2021)	All the King's Men (2027)

Singles from All the King's Men
- 1. "Roses" Released: 23 September 2026; 2. "Overthinker" Released: 28 October 2026; 3. "Evil" Released: 18 November 2026

All the King's Men is the upcoming fifth studio album by the Scottish synth-pop band Chvrches. It heavily features acoustic instruments, departing from the band's previous electronica-influenced sound. It is set to release on 22 January 2027.

== Background and recording ==
After the release of their previous album Screen Violence, Chvrches went on hiatus, with frontwoman Lauren Mayberry releasing a solo album, Vicious Creature. The band's other members, Martin Doherty and Iain Cook, also pursued solo projects. Mayberry stated at the time she had came to a "mutual understanding" with her bandmates, and emphasised that they had still signed a record deal for future work. In July 2025, the band announced that they had reunited and begun working on their next album. In February 2026, Chvrches told NME that they believed it was "90% complete" and that it would it would "surprise people".

The album was recorded over "intense three-week stints" in Glasgow.

== Composition and themes ==
In an NME article, the album was described as being about the "culture and history of Britain and Scotland". It features heavier usage of acoustic instruments than the band's previous work; Doherty stated that the band wanted to avoid "repeating ourselves" and creating "diminishing returns". Cook described the album as being influenced by artists such as Nick Drake, Bert Jansch, and The Incredible String Band; Doherty also cited Massive Attack, Siouxsie and the Banshees and film director Ken Loach as influences.

== Release and promotion ==
In March 2026, during the annual Teenage Cancer Trust concert series at Royal Albert Hall, the band performed the song "Conman" from the album. The first single, "Roses", was released on 23 September 2026 after premiering on BBC Radio 1 the same day. Two days later, Chvrches stated that they had signed with Futures Music Group for the album. The album was officially announced on 21 October, and the second single "Overthinker" was released on 28 October. The full album is set to release on 22 January 2027. The third single, "Evil", was released on 18 November.

== Track listing ==
No.	Title	Length
1.	"Roses"	3:28
2.	"Evil"	3:01
3.	"Adore You"	2:39
4.	"Overthinker"	3:41
5.	"Royal Blue"	3:24
6.	"Comedown Tomorrow"	4:50
7.	"Friend of a Friend"	4:04
8.	"Three Out of Five"	5:16
9.	"Conman"	2:40
10.	"Jamie's Prayer"	4:58
11.	"Faith in Flying"	4:58
Total length:		42:59
