= Love Is Dead (Chvrches album) =

Studio album by Chvrches
- Released: 25 May 2018
- Recorded: February–December 2017
- Studios: Echo, Los Angeles (Note: Tracks 1–3, 5, 6, 8, 9, 12 and 13); Alucard, New York City (Note: Tracks 4, 10 and 11); Red Bull, New York City (Note: Track 10); Rokstone, London (Note: Track 7)
- Genre: Synth-pop
- Length: 49:03
- Labels: Virgin EMI; Goodbye
- Producers: 31st Day; Chvrches; Greg Kurstin; Ice Mike; Steve Mac

Chvrches chronology
Every Open Eye (2015)	Love Is Dead (2018)	Hansa Session EP (2018)

Singles from Love Is Dead
- 1. "Get Out" Released: 31 January 2018; 2. "My Enemy" Released: 28 February 2018; 3. "Never Say Die" Released: 29 March 2018; 4. "Miracle" Released: 10 April 2018

Professional ratings
Aggregate scores
Source	Rating
AnyDecentMusic?	6.6/10
Metacritic	73/100
Review scores
Source	Rating
AllMusic	3.5/5 stars
The A.V. Club	B
The Independent	5/5 stars
Mojo	4/5 stars
NME	4/5 stars
The Observer	4/5 stars
Pitchfork	6.3/10
Q	3/5 stars
Rolling Stone	3.5/5 stars
Uncut	6/10

Love Is Dead is the third studio album by Scottish synth-pop band Chvrches. It was released on 25 May 2018 by Virgin EMI Records and Goodbye Records. The album was co-produced by Greg Kurstin, marking the first time the band have worked with outside producers. The band collaborated with David Stewart from Eurythmics and Matt Berninger from The National during production. The album was announced by Martin Doherty at the start of January 2018, with frontwoman Lauren Mayberry accidentally revealing the album's name in a since-deleted interview that same month.

After wiping their social media accounts, the band released the lead single, "Get Out", on 31 January. The track listing for the album was released two days before the next single, "My Enemy", which featured Berninger, was released on 28 February. The third single from the album, "Never Say Die", was released on 29 March. The song "Forever" is featured prominently in the third season of the Netflix series Elite.

== Background ==
In September 2015, the band released their second studio album, Every Open Eye, two years after the release of their critically acclaimed debut album, The Bones of What You Believe. It received positive reviews and spawned the singles "Leave a Trace", "Clearest Blue", "Never Ending Circles" and "Empty Threat". Besides releasing the song "Warning Call", cowritten with Solar Fields, for the game Mirror's Edge Catalyst, and releasing a version of "Bury It" with Paramore's Hayley Williams, the band stayed relatively quiet for the rest of the year and the next.

On 1 January 2018, Martin Doherty announced that the band would release an album within the year. That same month, Lauren Mayberry "accidentally" confirmed this and revealed the album's title in an interview, which has been since deleted. On 26 February, the band revealed the tracklist to the album on Twitter.

== Recording and production ==
The band started working on Love Is Dead on 7 February 2017 in Los Angeles. In 24 February, David Stewart, formerly one-half of the musical duo Eurythmics, revealed that he was in the studio with the band. Greg Kurstin was revealed as a producer for the album on 12 December, with work nearing completion. According to an article from The Independent, the band opted for more universal topics instead of introspection during production, jotting down ideas in a notebook whenever an opportunity passed.

== Musical style ==
In an interview with Entertainment Weekly, the band described their work with Kurstin as "the most pop stuff we've done and also the most aggressive and vulnerable at the same time". On Annie Mac's BBC Radio 1 show, on the premiere of "Get Out", Mayberry said that:

After Every Open Eye, we went back into a little writing studio—this time in New York—but we still wanted to take a little time to work out where we wanted to go and what we wanted to do. We decided this time we wanted to work with a producer. I think it was really good for us to be pushed to do things differently and take risks.

She also explained the album would take an "honest" approach.

If it's going to be more pop it should be more aggressively pop—there's no doing things in half measures. It was nice to not be second guessing ourselves. It's still consistent with what we've done before but it feels like it'll be more of a live experience.

== Promotion ==
The album's lead single, "Get Out", premiered on BBC Radio 1 on 31 January 2018, where Annie Mac dubbed it the Hottest Record in the World; it was released the same day. The second single, "My Enemy", featuring vocals from Matt Berninger of The National, was named Zane Lowe's World Record when it premiered on Beats 1 in 28 February, after the tracklist and artwork reveal. "Never Say Die" was released on 29 March, the third single from the album. Premiered on BBC Radio 1, "Miracle" was released on 10 April as the fourth and final single. It is the album's only song recorded in the United Kingdom.

Prior to the release of "Get Out", and after wiping all of their social media accounts, the band released a short video with a weblink captioned "GET IN", which contained a link that would lead to a Facebook Messenger page made by the band. Furthermore, in the music video for the respective single, alongside Matt Berninger taping an advertisement, a poster advertised a phone number. When called, Mayberry reads part of the lyrics to "My Enemy".

Prior to the official release, the band celebrated the upcoming album with a release party by performing live at iHeartRadio Album Release Party in New York City on 22 May. During the show, they debuted some of the new music for the first time, including songs like "God's Plan", "Graffiti" and "Forever".

== Commercial performance ==
Love Is Dead debuted at number seven on the UK Albums Chart, selling 11,763 copies in its first week. The album debuted at number 11 on the US Billboard 200 as well as number 1 on the Top Alternative Albums and Top Rock Albums chart with 28,000 album equivalent units.

== Track listing ==
All tracks are written by Iain Cook, Martin Doherty, Lauren Mayberry and Greg Kurstin, and produced by Kurstin; except where noted.

No.	Title	Writer(s)	Producer(s)	Length
1.	"Graffiti"		Mac; Ice Mike	3:38
2.	"Get Out"			3:51
3.	"Deliverance"			4:12
4.	"My Enemy" (featuring Matt Berninger)	Cook; Doherty; Mayberry	Chvrches	3:53
5.	"Forever"		Ice Mike; 31st Day	3:44
6.	"Never Say Die"			4:23
7.	"Miracle"	Cook; Doherty; Mayberry; Steve Mac	Mac; Chvrches	3:08
8.	"Graves"			4:43
9.	"Heaven/Hell"			5:05
10.	"God's Plan"	Cook; Doherty; Mayberry	Chvrches	3:31
11.	"Really Gone"	Cook; Doherty; Mayberry	Chvrches	3:11
12.	"ii"			1:09
13.	"Wonderland"			4:35
Total length:				49:03

Japanese edition bonus tracks
No.	Title	Length
14.	"Get Out" (One Bit Remix)	5:25
15.	"Get Out" (Roosevelt Remix)	3:09
16.	"Miracle" (Manila Killa Remix)	3:07
Total length:		61:03

Japanese deluxe edition bonus tracks
No.	Title	Writer(s)	Producer(s)	Length
14.	"Out of My Head" (featuring Wednesday Campanella)	Cook; Doherty; Mayberry; KOM_I; Kenmochi Hidefumi	Chvrches	3:28
15.	"Get Out" (Roosevelt Remix)			3:08
16.	"Miracle" (IHF Remix)	Cook; Doherty; Mayberry; Mac	Mac; Chvrches	3:29
17.	"Miracle" (Mija Remix)	Cook; Doherty; Mayberry; Mac	Mac; Chvrches	4:31
18.	"Miracle" (The Juan Maclean Remix)	Cook; Doherty; Mayberry; Mac	Mac; Chvrches	5:24
Total length:				69:11

== Personnel ==
Credits adapted from the liner notes of Love Is Dead.

=== Chvrches ===
- Iain Cook
- Martin Doherty
- Lauren Mayberry

=== Additional musicians ===
- Ian Chang – drums (10)

=== Technical ===
- Greg Kurstin – record engineering (1–3, 5, 6, 8, 9, 12, 13)
- Julian Burg – record engineering (1–3, 5, 6, 8, 9, 12, 13)
- Alex Pasco – record engineering (1–3, 5, 6, 8, 9, 12, 13)
- David Simpson – record engineering (4, 10, 14)
- Sean O'Brien – record engineering (4)
- Dann Pursey – record engineering (7)
- Chris Laws – record engineering (7)
- Mark Bengston – record engineering (10)
- Chvrches – record engineering (11)
- Hideyuki Matsuhashi – record engineering (14)
- Spike Stent – mixing
- Michael Freeman – mixing assistance
- Chris Gehringer – mastering

=== Artwork ===
- Warren Fu – creative direction
- Liz Hirsch – design, layout
- Lindsey Byrnes – sleeve photograph
- Danny Clinch – inside photograph

== Charts ==
Chart (2018)	Peak position
Australian Albums (ARIA)	7
Austrian Albums (Ö3 Austria)	16
Belgian Albums (Ultratop Flanders)	60
Belgian Albums (Ultratop Wallonia)	86
Canadian Albums (Billboard)	22
Czech Albums (ČNS IFPI)	41
Dutch Albums (Album Top 100)	88
German Albums (Offizielle Top 100)	16
Irish Albums (IRMA)	15
Japan Hot Albums (Billboard Japan)	52
Japanese Albums (Oricon)	45
New Zealand Albums (RMNZ)	35
Scottish Albums (Official Charts)	5
South Korean International Albums (Gaon)	3
Spanish Albums (PROMUSICAE)	81
Swiss Albums (Schweizer Hitparade)	27
UK Albums (Official Charts)	7
US Billboard 200	11
US Top Alternative Albums (Billboard)	1
US Top Rock Albums (Billboard)	1

== Certifications ==
Certifications for Love Is Dead
Region	Certification	Certified units/sales
United Kingdom (BPI)	Silver	60,000^{‡}
^{‡} Sales+streaming figures based on certification alone.

== Love Is Dead Tour ==
In support of their new album, Chvrches played live worldwide in the festival circuit and venues between 2018 and 2019. The tour officially started on 25 May 2018, with a free show at House Of Vans in London to celebrate the release of their album, but an early album release party held at iHeartRadio Theatre in New York and other two previous shows (19 May 2018 - The Josie Dye One Year Anniversary Show at Danforth Music Hall in Toronto and 21 May 2018 - Elsewhere, Brooklyn, NY) are generally considered as part of the tour based on their common setlist and stage design. On 10 December 2019, the band announced the official end of the tour with a message posted on their blog. The band performed in over 20 countries, attending more than 150 events. For the very first time since their formation, the band added a live drummer, Jonny Scott, to their touring lineup.

=== Setlist ===
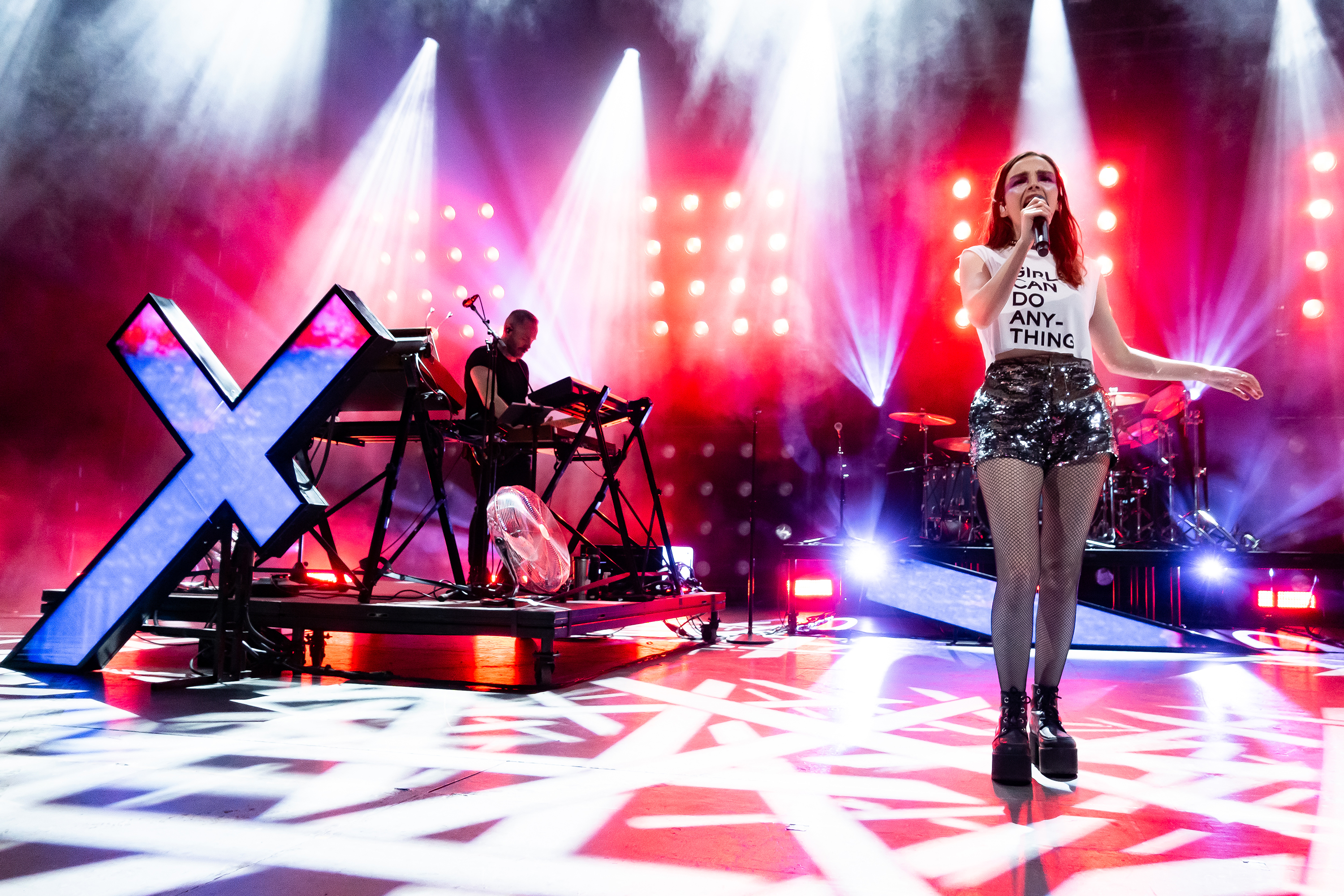
Chvrches performing live at The Greek Theatre in Griffith Park, Los Angeles in 2018

While the played setlist varied slightly with each show, the typical setlist contained:

1. "Get Out"
2. "Bury It"
3. "Gun"
4. "We Sink"
5. "Graffiti"
6. "Graves"
7. "Miracle"
8. "Under the Tide"
9. "Science/Visions"
10. "Forever"
11. "Recover"
12. "Leave a Trace"
13. "Clearest Blue"
14. "Never Say Die"
15. "The Mother We Share"

=== Stage Design and Crew ===
For the Love is Dead tour, the stage design was created by the lighting designer and programmer Louis Oliver, who has been working with the band since 2013. The idea behind the blueprints was to use a flexible design which could fit any type of show size. "The main request from the band was to have a more performance focused design, with looks that amplified their performance." while avoiding the use of any large video screens. The solution was to create 15 touring lighting pods containing 16 Elation Fuze Par Z120 which allowed them to adapt to each venue's limitations. The lighting setup also included 12 Robe BMFL Wash Beams, 13 GLP JDC1, 2 Base Hazer Pros and 2 grandMA2 Light consoles. The most visible elements of the floor package were three custom-built pieces comprising two crosses and a balancing symbol that mimic the artwork created by Warren Fu for the Love is Dead album cover.

The tour crew also included:

- Tour Manager: Cara McDaniel
- Production Manager: Patrick Scott
- MIDI Tech: David Simpson
- Lighting Director: Greg Hill
- Lighting Crew Chief: Christopher Hassfurther
- Lighting Tech: Troy Grubb
- Lighting Crew Chief: Amanda "Cupcake" Ritchie
- Lighting Tech: Josh Welch

=== Shows ===
The performances with short setlists (five songs or fewer) are not included in the list below.

== Tour dates ==
List of concerts showing date, city, country and venue.
Date	City	Country	Venue
North America
19 May 2018	Toronto	Canada	The Josie Dye One Year Anniversary Show
21 May 2018	New York City	United States	Elsewhere
22 May 2018	New York City	United States	iHeartRadio Theater
Europe
25 May 2018	London	United Kingdom	House of Vans
26 May 2018	Swansea	United Kingdom	BBC Music's Biggest Weekend
29 May 2018	Kingston upon Thames	United Kingdom	The Hippodrome
31 May 2018	Barcelona	Spain	Primavera Sound
North America
3 June 2018	New York City	United States	Governors Ball Music Festival
8 June 2018	Hilvarenbeek	Netherlands	Best Kept Secret
10 June 2018	Manchester	United Kingdom	Parklife
North America
16 June 2018	Toronto	Canada	North by Northeast
17 June 2018	Camden	United States	Radio 104.5's 11th Birthday Show
Europe
22 June 2018	Scheeßel	Germany	Hurricane Festival
23 June 2018	Neuhausen ob Eck	Germany	Southside Festival
29 June 2018	Panenský Týnec	Czech Republic	Aerodrome Festival
30 June 2018	Saint-Cergue	Switzerland	Open Air St. Gallen
4 July 2018	Gdynia	Poland	Open'er Festival
6 July 2018	Werchter	Belgium	Rock Werchter
8 July 2018	Glasgow	United Kingdom	TRNSMT
11 July 2018	Linz	Austria	Ahoi The Full Hit of Summer
13 July 2018	Algés	Portugal	NOS Alive
15 July 2018	London	United Kingdom	Citadel Festival at Gunnersbury Park
Oceania
21 July 2018	Apollo Bay	Australia	Splendour in the Grass
22 July 2018	Sydney	Australia	Hordern Pavilion
23 July 2018	Melbourne	Australia	Margaret Court Arena
Asia
27 July 2018	Seoul	South Korea	Sound City Seoul at SK Olympic Handball Gymnasium
29 July 2018	Yuzawa	Japan	Fuji Rock Festival
North America
1 August 2018	Chicago	United States	Metro Chicago
2 August 2018	Chicago	United States	Lollapalooza
3 August 2018	St. Charles	United States	Hinterland Music Festival
4 August 2018	Omaha	United States	The Waiting Room Lounge
6 August 2018	Denver	United States	Ogden Theatre
7 August 2018	Denver	United States	Ogden Theatre
9 August 2018	Ogden	United States	Ogden Twilight at Ogden Amphitheatre
11 August 2018	San Francisco	United States	Outside Lands Music and Arts Festival
12 August 2018	Long Beach	United States	ALT 98.7 Summer Camp
14 August 2018	Los Angeles	United States	Jimmy Kimmel Live Concert Series
Europe
31 August 2018	Stradbally	Ireland	Electric Picnic
North America
20 September 2018	San Diego	United States	Cal Coast Open Air Amphitheater
21 September 2018	Las Vegas	United States	Life Is Beautiful Music & Art Festival
22 September 2018	Sacramento	United States	City of Trees Music Festival
23 September 2018	Los Angeles	United States	Greek Theatre
26 September 2018	Portland	United States	Arlene Schnitzer Concert Hall
27 September 2018	Vancouver	Canada	Commodore Ballroom
28 September 2018	Vancouver	Canada	Commodore Ballroom
29 September 2018	Seattle	United States	Paramount Theatre
2 October 2018	Saint Paul	United States	Palace Theatre
3 October 2018	Saint Paul	United States	Palace Theatre
4 October 2018	Milwaukee	United States	Riverside Theater
6 October 2018	Austin	United States	Austin City Limits Music Festival
8 October 2018	Birmingham	United States	Iron City Bham
9 October 2018	Asheville	United States	Thomas Wolfe Auditorium
10 October 2018	Atlanta	United States	Tabernacle
11 October 2018	New Orleans	United States	Joy Theater
13 October 2018	Austin	United States	Austin City Limits Music Festival
15 October 2018	Nashville	United States	Ryman Auditorium
16 October 2018	Charlotte	United States	The Fillmore Charlotte
18 October 2018	Washington, D.C.	United States	The Anthem
19 October 2018	Philadelphia	United States	Franklin Music Hall
20 October 2018	Boston	United States	Orpheum Theatre
21 October 2018	Boston	United States	Orpheum Theatre
Europe
2 November 2018	Paris	France	Pitchfork Music Festival
3 November 2018	Utrecht	Netherlands	TivoliVredenburg
5 November 2018	Brussels	Belgium	Ancienne Belgique
6 November 2018	Cologne	Germany	Live Music Hall
7 November 2018	Berlin	Germany	Tempodrom
9 November 2018	Hamburg	Germany	Docks
10 November 2018	Vienna	Austria	Gasometer B
11 November 2018	Stuttgart	Germany	LKA Longhorn
12 November 2018	Munich	Germany	Muffathalle
14 November 2018	Milan	Italy	Fabrique
15 November 2018	Lausanne	Switzerland	Les Docks
16 November 2018	Luxembourg City	Luxembourg	Den Atelier
North America
18 November 2018	Mexico City	Mexico	Corona Capital
28 November 2018	Tulsa	United States	Cain's Ballroom
1 December 2018	Chicago	United States	The Nights We Stole Christmas at Aragon Ballroom
2 December 2018	Tampa	United States	97X Next Big Thing Music Festival
4 December 2018	Kansas City	United States	Midland Theatre
6 December 2018	New York City	United States	Barclays Center
8 December 2018	San Jose	United States	ALT 105.3 Not So Silent Night at SAP Center
9 December 2018	Inglewood	United States	The Forum
Oceania
30 December 2018	Bream Creek	Australia	Falls Festival
31 December 2018	Lorne	Australia	Falls Festival
1 January 2019	Sydney	Australia	Field Day
2 January 2019	Byron Bay	Australia	Falls Festival
5 January 2019	Fremantle	Australia	Falls Festival
7 January 2019	Sydney	Australia	Sydney Opera House
Europe
7 February 2019	London	United Kingdom	Alexandra Palace
8 February 2019	Birmingham	United Kingdom	O2 Academy Birmingham
9 February 2019	Birmingham	United Kingdom	O2 Academy Birmingham
11 February 2019	Nottingham	United Kingdom	Rock City
12 February 2019	Bournemouth	United Kingdom	O2 Academy Bournemouth
14 February 2019	Manchester	United Kingdom	Victoria Warehouse
15 February 2019	Manchester	United Kingdom	Victoria Warehouse
16 February 2019	Glasgow	United Kingdom	SSE Hydro
18 February 2019	Newcastle upon Tyne	United Kingdom	O2 Academy Newcastle
19 February 2019	Belfast	United Kingdom	Ulster Hall
21 February 2019	Dublin	Ireland	Olympia Theatre
22 February 2019	Dublin	Ireland	Olympia Theatre
Asia
26 February 2019	Osaka	Japan	Zepp Bay
28 February 2019	Tokyo	Japan	Toyosu Pit
1 March 2019	Tokyo	Japan	Toyosu Pit
North America
30 March 2019	Tehuixtla	Mexico	Festival Vaivén (Jardines de México)
14 April 2019	Indio	United States	Coachella Valley Music and Arts Festival
16 April 2019	Las Vegas	United States	Brooklyn Bowl
18 April 2019	Pioneertown	United States	Pappy & Harriet's
19 April 2019	Berkeley	United States	The Greek Theatre
21 April 2019	Indio	United States	Coachella Valley Music and Arts Festival
22 April 2019	Phoenix	United States	The Van Buren
23 April 2019	Tucson	United States	Rialto Theatre
26 April 2019	Houston	United States	White Oak Music Hall
27 April 2019	Fort Worth	United States	Fortress Festival
28 April 2019	Austin	United States	Austin City Limits Music Festival
29 April 2019	Austin	United States	Austin City Limits Music Festival
1 MAY 2019	St. Louis	United States	The Pageant
2 May 2019	Chicago	United States	Aragon Ballroom
3 May 2019	Memphis	United States	Beale Street Music Festival
24 May 2019	Boston	United States	Boston Calling Music Festival
Europe
14 June 2019	Madrid	Spain	Paraiso Festival
North America
29 June 2019	Denver	United States	Westword Music Showcase
1 July 2019	Kansas City	United States	Uptown Theater
2 July 2019	Milwaukee	United States	Summerfest
4 July 2019	Ottawa	Canada	Ottawa Bluesfest
5 July 2019	Quebec City	Canada	Festival d'été de Québec
6 July 2019	Montreal	Canada	Montreal International Jazz Festival
7 July 2019	Toronto	Canada	Noir inside Rebel
9 July 2019	New Haven	United States	College Street Music Hall
11 July 2019	New York City	United States	Radio City Music Hall
12 July 2019	New York City	United States	Pioneer Works
13 July 2019	Minneapolis	United States	Basilica Block Party
14 July 2019	Louisville	United States	Forecastle Festival
Europe
18 July 2019	Bonțida	Romania	Electric Castle
21 July 2019	Beccles	United Kingdom	Latitude Festival
1 August 2019	Inverness	United Kingdom	Tartan Heart Festival
4 August 2019	Dublin	Ireland	Beatyard
8 August 2019	Budapest	Hungary	Sziget Festival
9 August 2019	Piešťany	Slovakia	GrapeFestival
11 August 2019	Edinburgh	United Kingdom	Summer Sessions @ Princes Street Gardens
Asia
15 August 2019	Incheon	South Korea	Your Summer Music Festival @ Paradise City Culture Park
17 August 2019	Osaka	Japan	Summer Sonic Festival
18 August 2019	Chiba	Japan	Summer Sonic Festival
Europe
23 August 2019	Wetherby	United Kingdom	Reading and Leeds Festivals
25 August 2019	Reading	United Kingdom	Reading and Leeds Festivals
North America
7 September 2019	Raleigh	United States	Hopscotch Music Festival
21 September 2019	Glen Ellen	United States	Sonoma Harvest Music Festival
12 October 2019	Washington, D.C.	United States	All Things Go - Union Market
2 November 2019	San Diego	United States	Dia De Los Deftones
Oceania
23 November 2019	Canberra	Australia	Spilt Milk
30 November 2019	Ballarat	Australia	Spilt Milk
North America
6 December 2019	Las Vegas	United States	Intersect Music Festival @ Las Vegas Festival Grounds
8 December 2019	Los Angeles	United States	Wiltern Theatre
