= Maybury (surname) =

Maybury is a surname. Notable people with the surname include:

- Alan Maybury (born 1978), Irish footballer
- Alfred Maybury (1877–?), English footballer
- Debra Maybury (born 1971), English cricketer
- Ged Maybury (born 1953), New Zealand writer
- Sir Henry Maybury (1864–1943), British army officer and civil engineer
- John Maybury (born 1958), English film director
- Kylie Maybury (1978–1984), Australian murder victim
- Mark Maybury (born 1964), American computer scientist
- Paul Maybury (born 1982), American comics artist and illustrator
- Percy Maybury (1893–1963), Australian rules footballer
- Richard J. Maybury (born 1946), American writer
- Rick Maybury (born 1954), British journalist
- Wendy Maybury, American stand-up comedian
- William C. Maybury (1848–1909), American politician
