= Luna Luna =

German folk rock band

- Origin: Recklinghausen, Germany
- Genre: Folk rock
- Years active: 1989–1997
- Past members: Frank Niggemann; Stefan Kahé; Markus Schroer; Lambert Stallmeyer; Wolfgang Bahne; Bettina Hagemann

Luna Luna was a German rock band from Recklinghausen, Germany formed in 1989. The founding members were Frank Niggemann (vocals), Stefan Kahé (guitar), Markus Schroer (keyboards), Lambert Stallmeyer (bass), Wolfgang Bahne (drums) and Bettina Hagemann (violin). They continued to perform until 1997, when the band was formally dissolved.

The group released several singles and three albums: Es war einmal (“Once upon a time”) in 1993, Rosa (“Pink”) in 1994 and Supernova in 1997. Their most successful single “Küss mich” (“Kiss me”) entered the German single charts in 1993. Nonetheless is the song “Wenn ich tot bin (sollst du tanzen)” [“When I'm dead (you should dance”)] from the Supernova album considered to be the band’s most famous one.

== Discography ==
=== Albums ===
- 1993: Es war einmal
- 1994: Rosa
- 1997: Supernova

=== Singles ===
- 1993: Küss Mich
- 1993: Schwarze Rose
- 1993: 60 Sekunden
- 1994: Rosa
- 1994: Sturmalarm
- 1994: Gibt es noch Liebe?
- 1995: Sehnsucht
