= Rick Maybury =

British journalist

Rick Maybury (born 1954) is a British technology journalist, editor, author, part-time aviator and collector of 1960s technology. He provided The Daily Telegraph's expert answer service for computer users.

Maybury began his career in journalism in about 1980 while working for a television manufacturer. He first submitted articles to a magazine called Electronics Today International, and eventually became an editorial assistant at Computing Today, one of the UK's first computer magazines. He wrote for and edited a number of magazines at the company, then left to launch his own short-lived computer magazine in the 1980s. He has subsequently been a freelance journalist for many publications, and was a regular columnist for The Daily Telegraph.

He has written for a wide range of print and electronic media including national daily newspapers, magazines and websites. His books include volumes one to four in the Boot Up series on personal computers, and numerous handbooks and guides to consumer technology.

He currently lives in South London with his "long-suffering partner, mentor, co-director and website workhorse" Jane, and their two children, Katie and Alex. He has developed what he humorously calls an "unhealthy obsession" with 1960s technology, including reel-to-reel tape recorders, miniature radio and TV sets, and various old telephones, clocks and barometers.

== Books ==
- Boot Up: The Daily Telegraph Beginner's Guide to Computers and Computing, Texere Publishing 2000 ISBN 1-58799-052-0
- Boot up Projects: The Daily Telegraph Guide to Doing Something Useful with Your Computer, Texere Publishing 2000 ISBN 1-58799-081-4
- Boot Up Rescue: The Daily Telegraph Guide To Diagnosing And Fixing Computer Problems, Texere Publishing 2002 ISBN 1-58799-126-8
- Complete Boot Up: Everything You Need to Know to Get the Best Out of Your PC, Texere Publishing 2003 ISBN 1-58799-160-8
