= Chvrches =

Scottish synthpop group

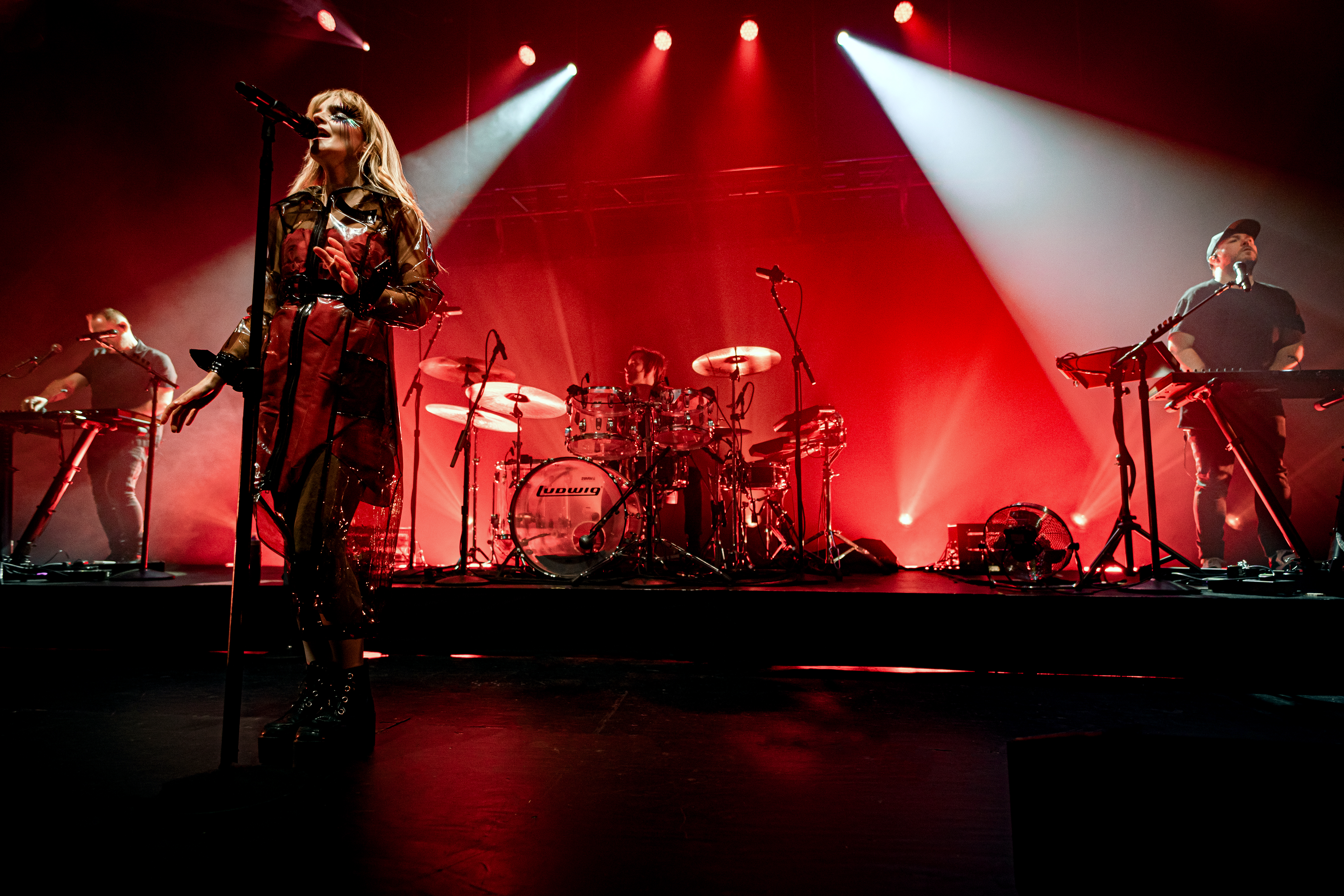
- Chvrches performing in Los Angeles in 2021

Background information
- Origin: Glasgow, Scotland
- Genres: Synth-pop; electropop; indie pop; indietronica
- Works: Chvrches discography
- Years active: 2011–present
- Labels: Island; Virgin; Goodbye; Glassnote; Virgin EMI
- Spinoffs: The Leaving
- Spinoff of: Aereogramme
- Members: Iain Cook; Martin Doherty; Lauren Mayberry
- Website: chvrch.es

Chvrches (stylised CHVRCHΞS and pronounced "Churches") are a Scottish synth-pop band from Glasgow, formed in September 2011. The band consists of Lauren Mayberry, Iain Cook, Martin Doherty and, unofficially since 2018, Jonny Scott. Mostly deriving from the synth-pop genre, Chvrches also incorporate indietronica, indie pop, and electronic dance into their sound.

Two years after their formation, Chvrches released Recover EP in March 2013, which included hits "The Mother We Share" and "Recover". Their debut studio album, The Bones of What You Believe, was released on 20 September 2013, while the band was ranked fifth on the Sound of 2013 list by the BBC. Two years later, on 25 September 2015, the group released their second album, Every Open Eye. Their third album, Love Is Dead, was released on 25 May 2018. Their fourth album, Screen Violence, was released on 27 August 2021.

== History ==
=== Origins and formation ===
In 2003, musicians Iain Cook and Martin Doherty met as students at the University of Strathclyde in Glasgow. Doherty was a member of the band Julia Thirteen, and asked Cook to produce the band's 2006 extended play (EP) With Tired Hears. Although Julia Thirteen never recorded any further material, the experience proved vital, as Cook and Doherty formed a mutual interest in eventually starting their own project. A few years later, Doherty joined Cook as a member of Aereogramme, but the band broke up in 2007 due to a lack of exposure. After the dissolution of Aereogramme, Doherty then became a touring member for the band the Twilight Sad, but quit in 2012 after he grew tired of playing someone else's music. He had planned to retrain as a history teacher before reconnecting with Cook, and the two formed the music project that would eventually become CHVRCHES.

A few years after Aereogramme broke up, Cook took an interest in the electronic sound of the band Emeralds. Cook bought a Minimoog Voyager and began "playing around with soundscapes and stuff like that ... kind of with a view of doing stuff from the '80s". In September 2011, he produced an EP for the band Blue Sky Archives, and asked the band's vocalist and drummer Lauren Mayberry if she would be interested in singing backing vocals for an electronic music project he and Doherty were working on. Mayberry was intrigued by the offer, as neither of them had any background in electronic music. "For me it was nice to write over different instruments and not have to try to sing and scream over live drums and a Marshall bass stack," said Mayberry.

The three musicians quickly bonded, and spent the next few months writing and recording songs in a basement studio. During these sessions, Mayberry wrote the lyrics and hooks, Doherty provided melodic ideas, and Cook produced the songs. Once the sessions had concluded, the three decided that they worked well enough together to try and perform the songs as a band. The initial plan was to have Doherty sing lead vocals, while Mayberry would sing backing vocals. Mayberry was eventually promoted to lead vocalist after Cook and Doherty heard her singing abilities. In addition to her new role, Mayberry became the band's frontwoman, and gave the other members a reading list about the inner workings of the music industry.

The band members settled on the name CHVRCHES (stylised as CHVRCHΞS), which uses the Roman letter "v" instead of a "u". This spelling was chosen to differentiate themselves from actual churches in online search results. There was no conscious decision to have a name with religious connotations; instead, the band members felt that the name gave "a strong vibe that could be interpreted in many different ways". Mayberry also noted that the v is a subtle nod to band names from the influential witch house genre of music, including bands such as SALEM and Ritualz. "We did consider putting upside down crosses at either side of our name, but that would have dated us, I think" said Mayberry.

=== 2012–2014: Breakthrough success, and The Bones of What You Believe ===
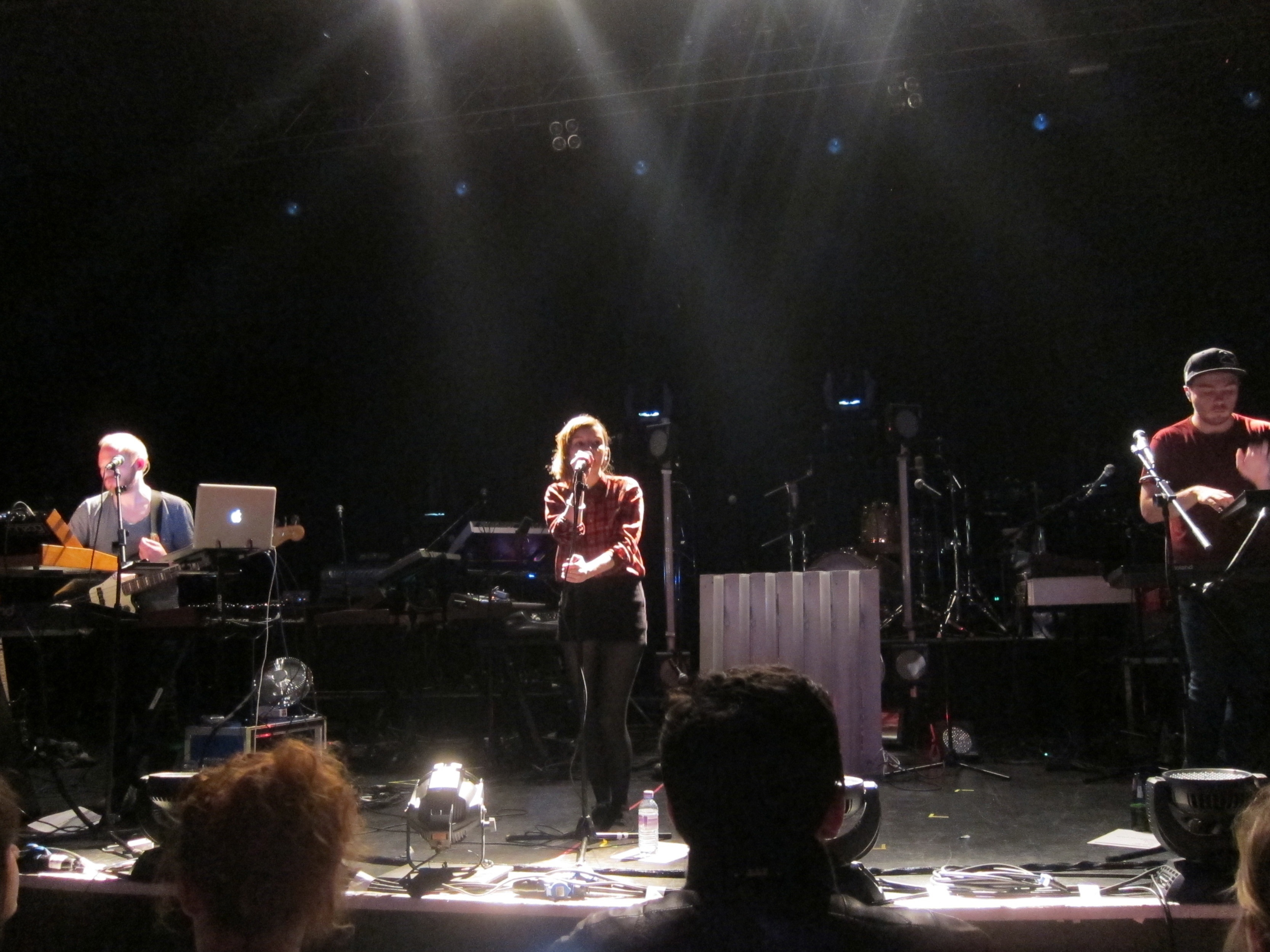
CHVRCHES performing in 2012

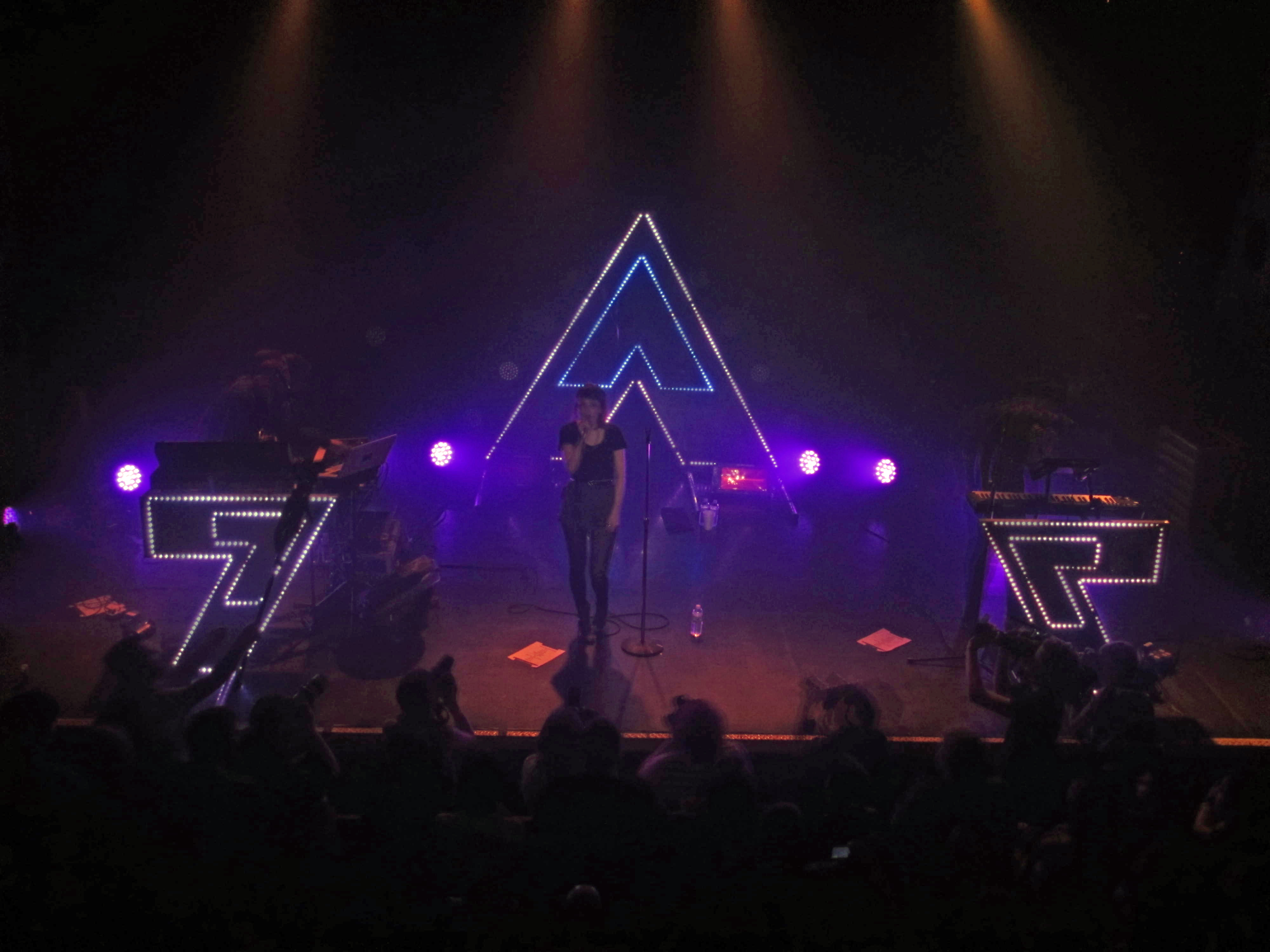
CHVRCHES performing at Metro, Chicago in 2013

Doherty noted how Chvrches began as a studio only project, saying: "There wasn't really any goal other than to put a song out on the internet and see what kind of response we got". In May 2012, Chvrches posted its debut song "Lies" on the Neon Gold Records blog. Instead of a picture of the band members, the song was accompanied by a picture of nuns in masks, which added to the perceived religiosity of the Chvrches name. The response was almost immediate; "Lies" reached number one on the MP3 aggregate blog The Hype Machine, and similarly received constant airplay on SoundCloud and BBC Radio 1. The band members were amazed by the reaction to "Lies". "It was unbelievable, way beyond what we expected," said Doherty.

Despite the popularity of "Lies", Chvrches had yet to perform a live show. There was a growing expectation that the band would eventually perform live, although the band members were anxious at the prospect. To curtail this fear, Chvrches played its first two live shows under the name Shark Week, before making its official debut at the Glasgow School of Art in July. When Chvrches began to attract A&R representatives, Mayberry was dismayed that most of them wanted to make her the central figure of the band; one representative called her the next Pixie Lott. From the beginning, the band's goal was to give equal treatment to all three members, and to not have any one person become the focal point. As Doherty stated: "We could have sold 200,000 more albums if we'd hidden Iain and I from view and put Lauren on the cover of every magazine. We ended up doing it in an indie band style. We broke through via word of mouth. It was about doing it in an honest, right way." This mentality meant that the band had to decline early offers for photo shoots and interviews that excluded Cook and Doherty.

Chvrches had already recorded eight other songs by the time "Lies" was released, in case listeners wanted to hear more music. One of these songs, "The Mother We Share", was released on 5 November 2012 as the band's debut single. "The Mother We Share" was similarly well received by listeners, and was downloaded more than 32,000 times by September 2013. Around this time, Chvrches co-manager Campbell McNeil attempted to contact Glassnote Records founder Daniel Glass, and gave Glass copies of "Lies" and another song called "Recover". After travelling to the UK to see Chvrches live, Glass signed the band to a recording contract in January 2013. To promote Chvrches, managers McNeil and Danny Rogers launched a nonstop touring schedule which included several international performances. Two months after signing with Glassnote, Chvrches made its North American debut at the South by Southwest festival in Austin, where the band won a Grulke Prize for best non-American act.

On 6 February 2013, Chvrches premiered the second single "Recover". It was followed by Recover EP, out on 25 March 2013 in the UK via Goodbye/Virgin and 26 March 2013 in the US via Glassnote. In March 2013 Chvrches performed at SXSW. They also won the Inaugural Grulke Prize (for Developing Non-US Act) at SXSW. On 19 June 2013, Chvrches made their US TV debut performing "The Mother We Share" on Late Night with Jimmy Fallon. On 15 July 2013, they released the single "Gun". In July 2013 Chvrches supported Depeche Mode on four shows from The Delta Machine Tour 2013. In September 2013, they also performed "The Mother We Share" on Later... with Jools Holland.

On 23 September 2013, the band released their debut studio album The Bones of What You Believe on Virgin and Goodbye Records. On the critical aggregator website Metacritic, the album received a score of 80, based on 39 reviews. On 30 September 2013, Mayberry penned an op-ed piece in The Guardian on what she perceived as sexist remarks directed towards her through the band's social media sites. Chvrches covered Bauhaus' song "'Bela Lugosi's Dead" for the ending credits of the film Vampire Academy. "The Mother We Share" was featured in the opening video for the 2014 Commonwealth Games Opening Ceremony in Glasgow, Scotland, on 23 July 2014.

On 30 October 2014, BBC host Zane Lowe premiered "Get Away" as the first song from the re-scored soundtrack of the 2011 Nicolas Winding Refn's film, Drive.

=== 2015–2016: Every Open Eye ===
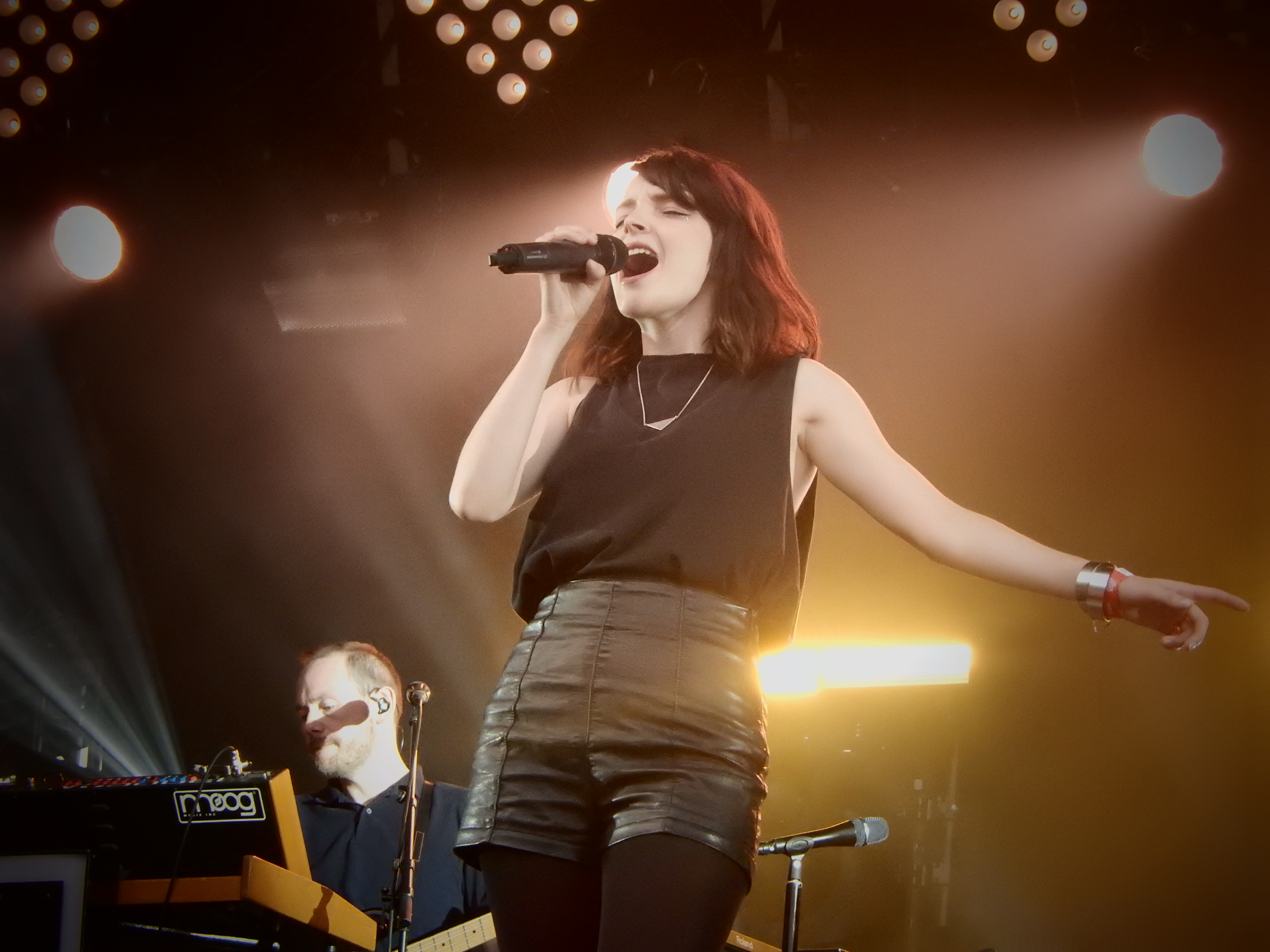
Chvrches performing at Rock en Seine in 2016

The band started recording their second album in January 2015, and on 5 June 2015 announced they had completed work on it. Recording was conducted in the same Glasgow facility used for The Bones, which received a major upgrade to recording gear and an increase in the instrumental variety for the second album. If The Bones of What You Believe was recorded with the only three synths they had at that time (Minimoog Voyager, Prophet '08, Roland Juno-106), the success of the debut album allowed the band to follow their passion for synths by adding a lot more to play with on Every Open Eye: Korg MS-20 mini, Korg Polysix, Roland Jupiter-8, Moog Sonic Six, Oberheim OB-Xa and DSI Prophet 12.

On 16 July 2015, the band revealed the release date, cover art, and track listing for the new album, entitled Every Open Eye. The following day they released the album's first single, "Leave a Trace". The album was released on 25 September 2015. On 12 August 2015, the second single, "Never Ending Circles", was released, and on 10 September 2015 the third single, "Clearest Blue", was also released. On 19 October 2015, the fourth single, "Empty Threat", was released. The music video was revealed on 20 November 2015.

On 31 March 2016, Chvrches made their debut at Royal Albert Hall as part of the Albert Sessions in an over two hours concert. The setlist included 17 songs from their first album and their follow-up: Every Open Eye. Chvrches and Solar Fields penned the original song "Warning Call" for the 2016 video game Mirror's Edge Catalyst. The theme song was released on 13 May 2016.

In June 2016, a new version of "Bury It" featuring Hayley Williams was released the fifth and final single from Every Open Eye. The music video for the song was illustrated by Jamie McKelvie, featuring the band and Williams demonstrating telekinetic powers.

=== 2017–2019: Love Is Dead ===
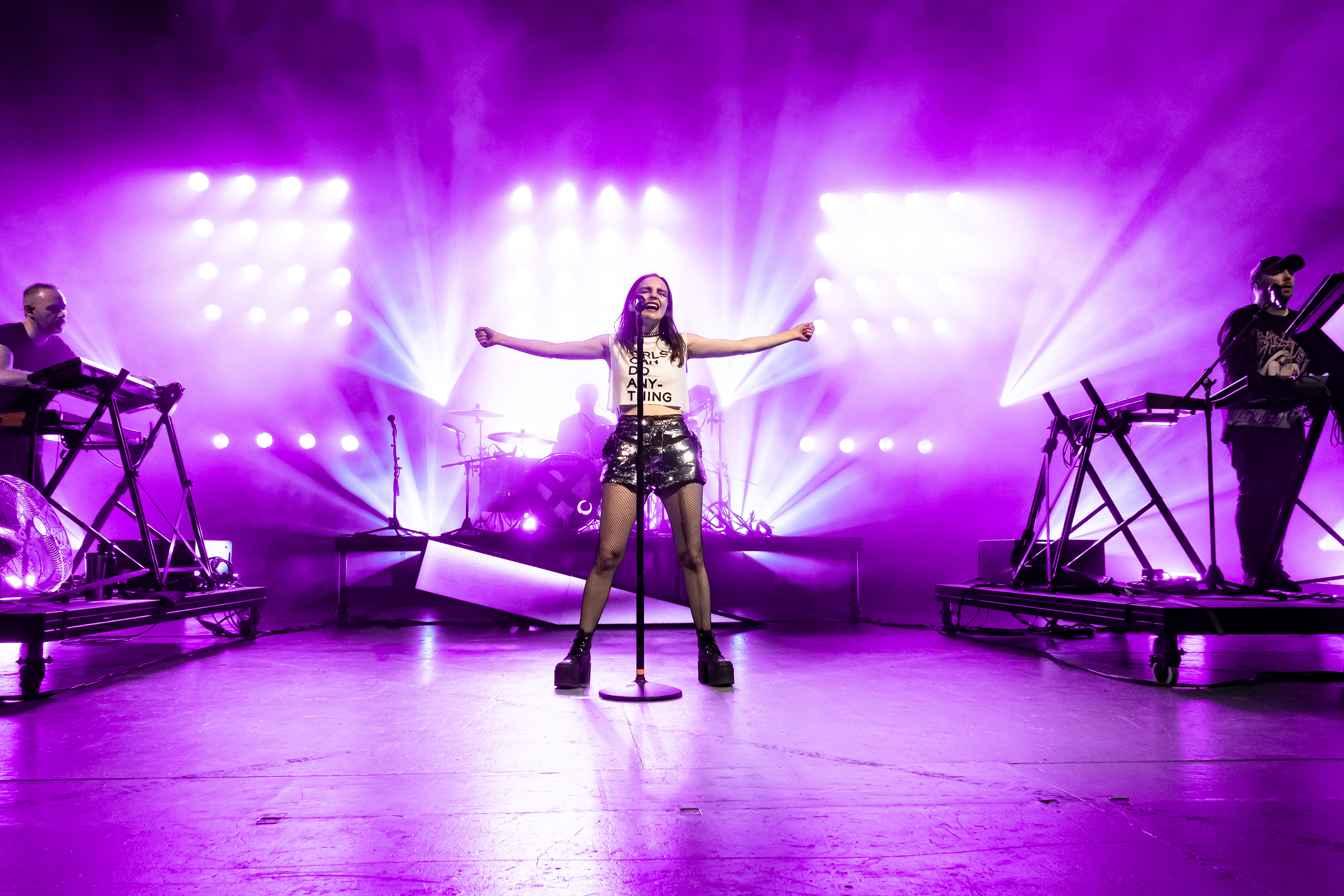
Chvrches performing at the Greek Theatre in Los Angeles in September 2018

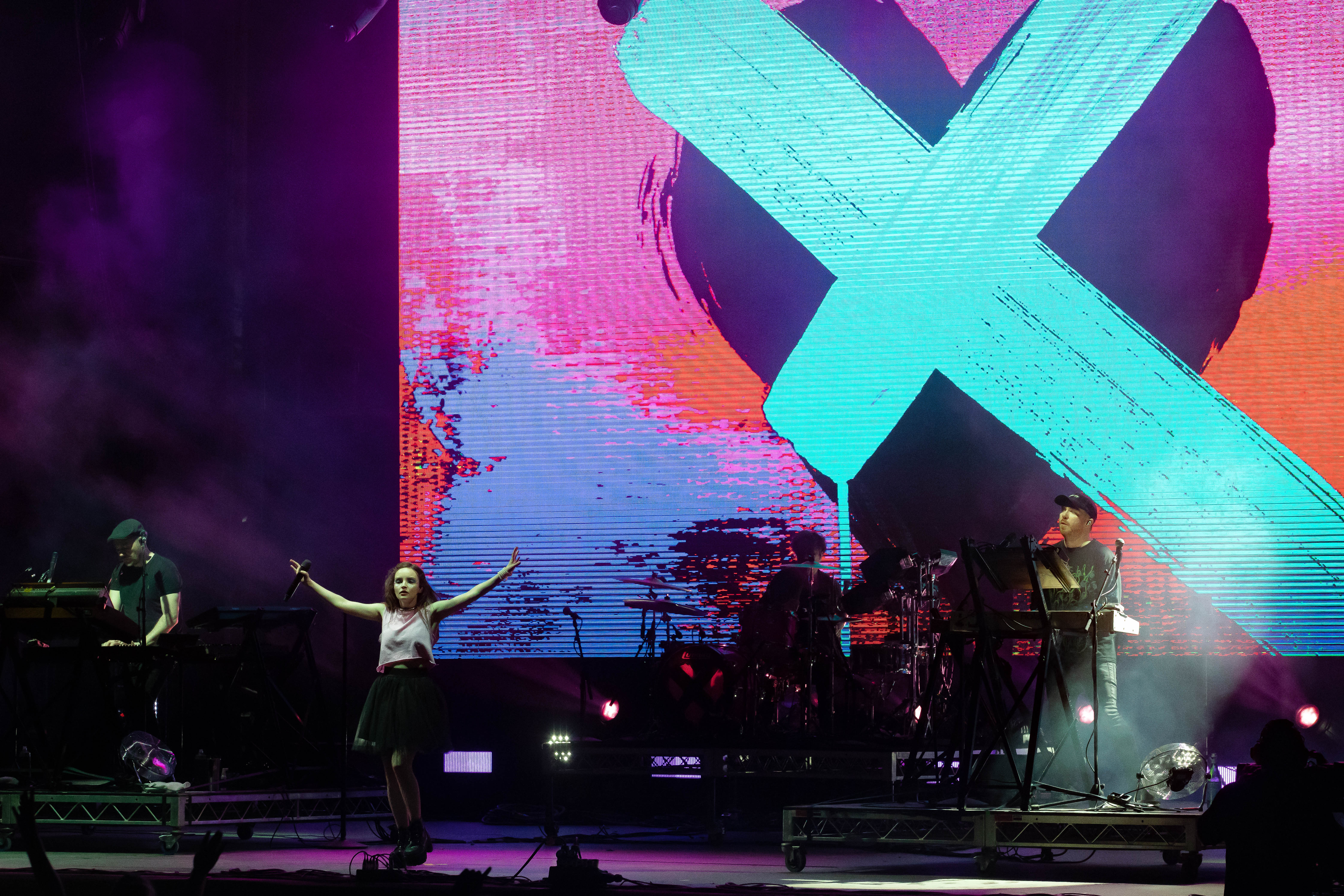
Chvrches performing at the Falls Festival during the Love Is Dead Tour, 2019

Chvrches began work on their third album in February 2017. The album was recorded in Los Angeles, New York City, and London. On 24 February 2017, Dave Stewart of Eurythmics revealed that he was in the studio working with the band. On 12 December, it was announced that Greg Kurstin had produced the album, and that work on the project was nearing completion Speaking about the album in an interview, Mayberry said "It's a typically Glaswegian thing to do, to feel the most misanthropic and macabre when you're in the sunniest place on earth."

To promote the upcoming album, the band wiped all of their social media pages, before posting a short video containing new music captioned "GET IN". The post was accompanied by a link to a Facebook Messenger page with the band. On 31 January 2018, BBC Radio 1's Annie Mac announced "Get Out" to be her Hottest Record in the World, giving the single its world premiere. The album also includes a song titled "My Enemy" featuring Matt Berninger of The National, released 28 February 2018. The track list was unveiled on 26 February 2018. On 29 March 2018, the band released "Never Say Die" as the third single from the album. On 10 April 2018, the band released "Miracle" as the fourth single from the album. Love Is Dead was released on 25 May 2018. On 9 October 2018, the band released "Graffiti" as the fifth single from the album.

In February 2019, the band was featured in a collaboration with the BBC Scottish Symphony Orchestra for the launch of the new BBC Scotland television channel. The channel's official launch on 24 February featured an orchestral performance of "Miracle". In March 2019, the band collaborated with EDM artist Marshmello on the track "Here with Me".

In October 2019, the band released the original song "Death Stranding" as the lead single of the album Death Stranding: Timefall for the 2019 video game of the same title. Chvrches played the song with Game Awards Orchestra at the opening of The Game Awards 2019 ceremony.

=== 2020–2026: Screen Violence and hiatus ===
Chvrches started working on their fourth album in February 2020. Martin Doherty and Lauren Mayberry worked on the album from Los Angeles while Iain Cook worked on the album from Glasgow. Chvrches started teasing the lead single for their fourth album, given the working title CHV4, on 9 April 2021. On 18 April 2021, Chvrches announced "He Said She Said" as the lead single for the album and it premiered on BBC Radio 1 on 19 April 2021. A second single, "How Not to Drown", featuring Robert Smith of the Cure, was released on 2 June 2021. The same day, the band announced their fourth album, Screen Violence, which was released on 27 August 2021. On 12 July 2021 they released the album's third and final single, "Good Girls". On 25 August 2021, the band performed "Good Girls" from the album Screen Violence on The Tonight Show Starring Jimmy Fallon.

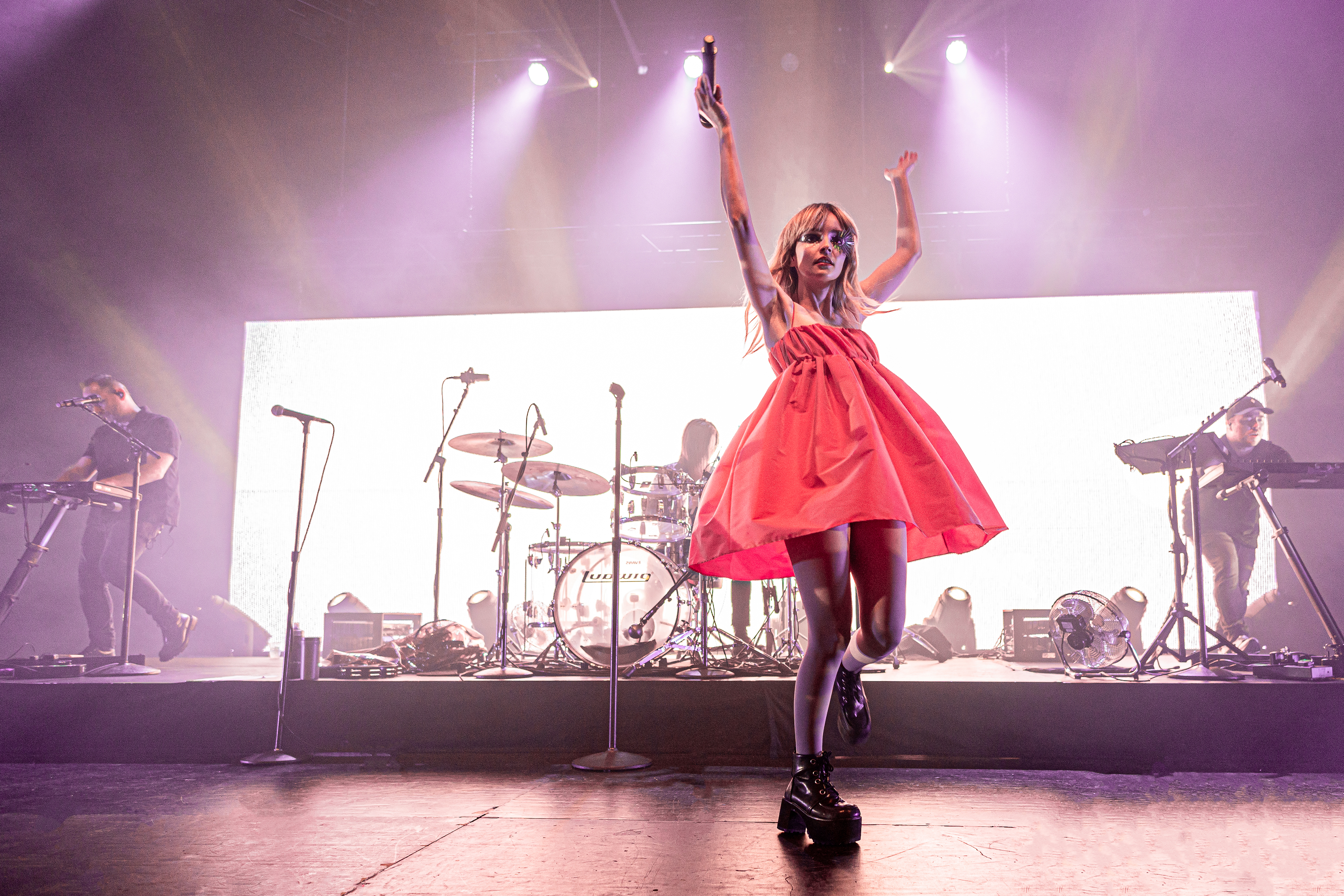
Chvrches performing at the Hollywood Palladium, 2021

After spending nearly a decade with Glassnote, Chvrches signed a deal with Island Records and EMI Records in 2022. On 24 February 2023, Chvrches released the single "Over", the first to be released as part of their new record deal. In July 2023, Mayberry announced she would be releasing solo music in advance of a solo tour in September and October of the same year while the band would be on hiatus. She also clarified that the band was "confident that the Chvrches story has many more pages yet to be written."

On 16 August 2023, Chvrches announced that a 10th anniversary special edition of The Bones of What You Believe was planned for release on 13 October of the same year. This release would include four previously unreleased tracks recorded during the production of the original album, in addition to five live tracks and the original 12 tracks. The first of the four newly added tracks, "Manhattan", was released as a single alongside the announcement. The 10th anniversary special edition was released on 20 October 2023. On 6 December 2024, Lauren Mayberry released her debut solo album titled Vicious Creature. It was supported by the singles "Are You Awake?", "Shame", "Change Shapes", "Something in the Air" and "Crocodile Tears". She also toured extensively from 2023 until 2025 with a live band, mainly in Europe and North America.

On 12 April 2025, Chvrches released a 10th anniversary special edition of Every Open Eye for Record Store Day. The release features eight bonus tracks, and is available as a double vinyl repack and two disk digital format. The band appears in 2025 video game Death Stranding 2: On the Beach as preppers working at the Animal Shelter in Australia. During a launch event for the game, they confirmed that they had begun working on a fifth album.

=== 2026–present: End of hiatus and All the King's Men ===
In January 2026, the band released a cover of Robert Palmer's 1985 hit "Addicted to Love" that was used in Season 3 of the Hulu series "Tell Me Lies". They followed that on 17 February 2026, with a release of a cover of the 2003 hit "Such Great Heights" from The Postal Service which was used in the finale episode of Season 3 of Tell Me Lies. During Chvrches' hiatus, Martin Doherty and the band's touring drummer Jonny Scott formed a side project called The Leaving, which released its debut album, Ultimate Buzz, in April 2026.

Chvrches told NME in February 2026 that their fifth album was "90% complete" and that they believed it would surprise fans. In March 2026, during the annual Teenage Cancer Trust concert series at Royal Albert Hall, the band performed the song "Conman" off the upcoming album. The album's first single, "Roses", premiered on BBC Radio 1 on 22 September 2026 and released the same day. It was announced two days later that the group had signed with Futures Music Group for the single and album. All the King's Men was officially announced on 21 October alongside a 2027 tour. It is set to be released on 22 January 2027.

== Artistry ==
=== Musical style ===
Known for their clean sound, Chvrches' music style is usually tagged as synth-pop, electropop, pop, indie pop, indietronica, electronic rock, indie rock, alternative pop, electronica, and electronic. Neon Gold described their sound as "a godless hurricane of kinetic pop energy". Kitty Empire of The Observer wrote they "make accessible electro-pop that's only just short of truly brilliant". Wired noted following Every Open Eye's release that the album "cements the group as today's heir apparent to Depeche Mode, New Order, and other titans of British electronic music."

=== Influences ===
The band stated that their heroes were Depeche Mode, David Bowie, Iggy Pop, Siouxsie and the Banshees, Tangerine Dream, and Nick Cave. They have also been influenced by acts such as New Order, the Cure, Brian Eno, Madonna, Eurythmics, the National, Throbbing Gristle, Prince, Tubeway Army, Lil Wayne, Laurie Anderson, Kate Bush, OMD, Deftones, Cyndi Lauper, Whitney Houston, Elliott Smith and Cocteau Twins. AllMusic lists Robyn, The Knife and Florence and the Machine as additional influences.

=== Live performances ===
When Chvrches play live, Mayberry performs lead vocals and occasionally plays synthesisers and samplers. She also played drums as a part of their second album tour as seen in "Playing Dead", "Empty Threat", and "Under the Tide"; Cook plays synthesisers, guitar, bass, and also performs backing vocals; Doherty plays synthesisers and samplers, and also performs backing vocals and sometimes lead vocals. In 2018, the band's live line-up expanded to a four-piece by adding Jonny Scott on drums. Chvrches tour globally and are active in the festival circuit, including Austin City Limits Music Festival, Bonnaroo, Canadian Music Fest, Coachella, Dia de los Deftones, Electric Castle, Electric Picnic, Field Day, Firefly Music Festival, Glastonbury, The Great Escape, Lollapalooza, Longitude, Lowlands, Melt! Festival, Music Midtown, Osheaga, Pitch Festival, Pukkelpop, Reading and Leeds Festival, Sasquatch! Music Festival, Summer Sonic, SXSW, Sziget Festival, T in the Park, Thrival Festival, TRNSMT, and the V Festival.

On 3 December 2015, Chvrches performed "Leave a Trace" at The Game Awards 2015 in Los Angeles, California, where they also announced the nominees for and winner of best indie game. In March 2023, the band toured Brazil for the first time as an opener for Coldplay on their Music of the Spheres World Tour. The band also performed two headlining shows while there.

== Band members ==
- Iain Cook – synthesizers, piano, guitars, bass, backing vocals (2011–present)
- Martin Doherty – synthesizers, samplers, piano, guitars, bass, backing and lead vocals (2011–present)
- Lauren Mayberry – lead and backing vocals, drums, percussion, additional synthesizers (2011–present)

Touring musicians

- Jonny Scott – drums, percussion (2018–present)

== Discography ==
- The Bones of What You Believe (2013)
- Every Open Eye (2015)
- Love Is Dead (2018)
- Screen Violence (2021)
- All the King's Men (2027)

== Awards and nominations ==
Year	Organisation	Award	Result	Ref.
2012	BBC Sound of 2013	Sound of 2013	Fifth	
2012	Rober Awards Music Poll	Most Promising New Artist	Nominated	
2013	Rober Awards Music Poll	Best Pop Artist	Nominated	
2013	Rober Awards Music Poll	Breakthrough Artist	Won	
2013	South by Southwest	Inaugural Grulke Prize (for Developing Non-US Act)	Won	
2013	Popjustice £20 Music Prize	Best British Pop Single for "The Mother We Share"	Won	
2014	A2IM Libera Awards	Breakthrough Artist of the Year	Won	
2014	The SAY Awards	Scottish Album of the Year	Nominated	
2014	NME Awards	Best New Band	Nominated	
2015	NME Awards	Best British Band	Nominated	
2015	Brit Awards	British Breakthrough Act	Nominated	
2016	The SAY Awards	Scottish Album of the Year	Nominated	
2018	iHeartRadio Much Music Video Awards	Best Rock/Alternative Artist or Group	Nominated	
2018	Best Art Vinyl	Best Art Vinyl for Love is Dead	Nominated	
2019	Sweden GAFFA Awards	Best Foreign Band	Nominated	
2019	The SAY Awards	Scottish Album of the Year (Longlisted)	Nominated	
2021	Consequence's 2021 Annual Report	Band of the Year	Won	
2022	NME Awards	Best Song in the World for "How Not to Drown"	Nominated	
2022	NME Awards	Best Song by a UK Artist for "How Not to Drown"	Won	
2022	NME Awards	Best Band in the World	Nominated	
2022	NME Awards	Best Band from the UK	Nominated	
2022	Denmark GAFFA Awards	Best International Band	Nominated	
2022	Denmark GAFFA Awards	Best International Album for Screen Violence	Nominated	

== See also ==
- List of bands from Glasgow
- List of Scottish musicians
