= George Mayberry =

Irish triple jumper

Personal information
- Nationality: Irish
- Born: 24 July 1883 Kenmare, Kerry, Ireland
- Died: 21 November 1961 (aged 79) Frant, East Sussex, England

Sport
- Sport: Athletics
- Event: high jump / triple jump
- Club: Clonliffe Harriers, Dublin

George Mahoney Mayberry (24 July 1883 – 21 November 1961) was an Irish track and field athlete who competed in the 1908 Summer Olympics.

== Biography ==
Mayberry was born in Kenmare, Ireland and was educated at Dublin University. He joined the Clonliffe Harriers of Dublin.

Mayberry represented Great Britain at the 1908 Summer Olympics in London, where he participated in the triple jump event but the distance he recorded is unknown, although he did finish in the top seventeen.

Mayberry excelled in the high jump and finished second behind Con Leahy at the IAAA Championships in 1906, 1907, 1901 and 1911.

From 1914 to 1919, Mayberry served with the Royal Army Medical Corps and later became the medical superintendent of Dagenham Sanatorium and Landon Hills Sanatorium for Children. He died in Frant, East Sussex on 21 November 1961.
