= Martin Doherty =

Scottish musician

- Doherty in 2014

Background information
- Born: Martin Clifford Doherty; 24 December 1983 (age 42); Old Kilpatrick, Dunbartonshire, Scotland
- Origin: Glasgow, Scotland
- Genres: Alternative rock; synth-pop; electropop; electronic; post-rock
- Occupations: Musician; composer; record producer; singer
- Instruments: Keyboards; sampler; guitar; vocals
- Years active: 1999–present
- Member of: Chvrches; The Leaving
- Formerly of: Aereogramme; Julia Thirteen

Martin Clifford Doherty (born 24 December 1983) is a Scottish musician, singer and record producer. He is a member of Glasgow-based pop band Chvrches, with whom he has recorded four studio albums. Prior to forming Chvrches, Doherty was a touring member of the indie rock bands the Twilight Sad and Aereogramme; the latter with Chvrches bandmate Iain Cook.

Doherty plays keyboards, sampler, guitar and performs main vocals and backing vocals. He also contributes to Chvrches' songwriting and production.

== Biography ==
Doherty was born on 24 December 1983 in Old Kilpatrick and grew up in Glasgow. Prior to the formation of Chvrches, Doherty was a touring member of The Twilight Sad. He was also the frontman of the rock band Julia Thirteen, founded in 1999 and disbanded in 2006. He met and befriended future Chvrches bandmate Iain Cook in 2004 while attending the University of Strathclyde. In 2006, Cook co-recorded Julia Thirteen's debut EP before Doherty joined Cook's own band Aereogramme in 2007.

Both on Chvrches' debut album The Bones of What You Believe and in concert, Doherty performs lead vocals for the songs "Under the Tide" and "You Caught the Light", the latter on which he also plays bass guitar. Some early performances of the song "We Sink" featured Doherty as the lead vocalist, though lead singer Lauren Mayberry later assumed that role full-time. Chvrches' second album Every Open Eye has Doherty on lead vocals for the songs "High Enough to Carry You Over" and "Follow You", the latter of which is a bonus track included on deluxe versions of the album. Though initially excluded from set lists early in the Every Open Eye tour, "High Enough to Carry You Over" made its live debut on 13 March 2016 at the Riviera Theatre in Chicago, Illinois. Like Lauren Mayberry, Doherty currently lives in LA with his partner.

In November of 2025, Doherty revealed his latest project, The Leaving - a duo consisting of himself and unofficial Chvrches member, Jonny Scott. Their first single, "Saved", was released on the 20th.

== Personal life ==
Doherty's father is a Catholic deacon and religious education teacher.

== Discography ==
With Chvrches

- The Bones of What You Believe (2013)
- Every Open Eye (2015)
- Love Is Dead (2018)
- Screen Violence (2021)

With The Twilight Sad

- Forget the Night Ahead (2009)

With Aereogramme

- My Heart Has a Wish That You Would Not Go (2007)

With Julia Thirteen

- With Tired Hearts EP (2006)

With The Leaving

- Ultimate Buzz (2026)
