= Lauren Mayberry =

Scottish singer (born 1987)

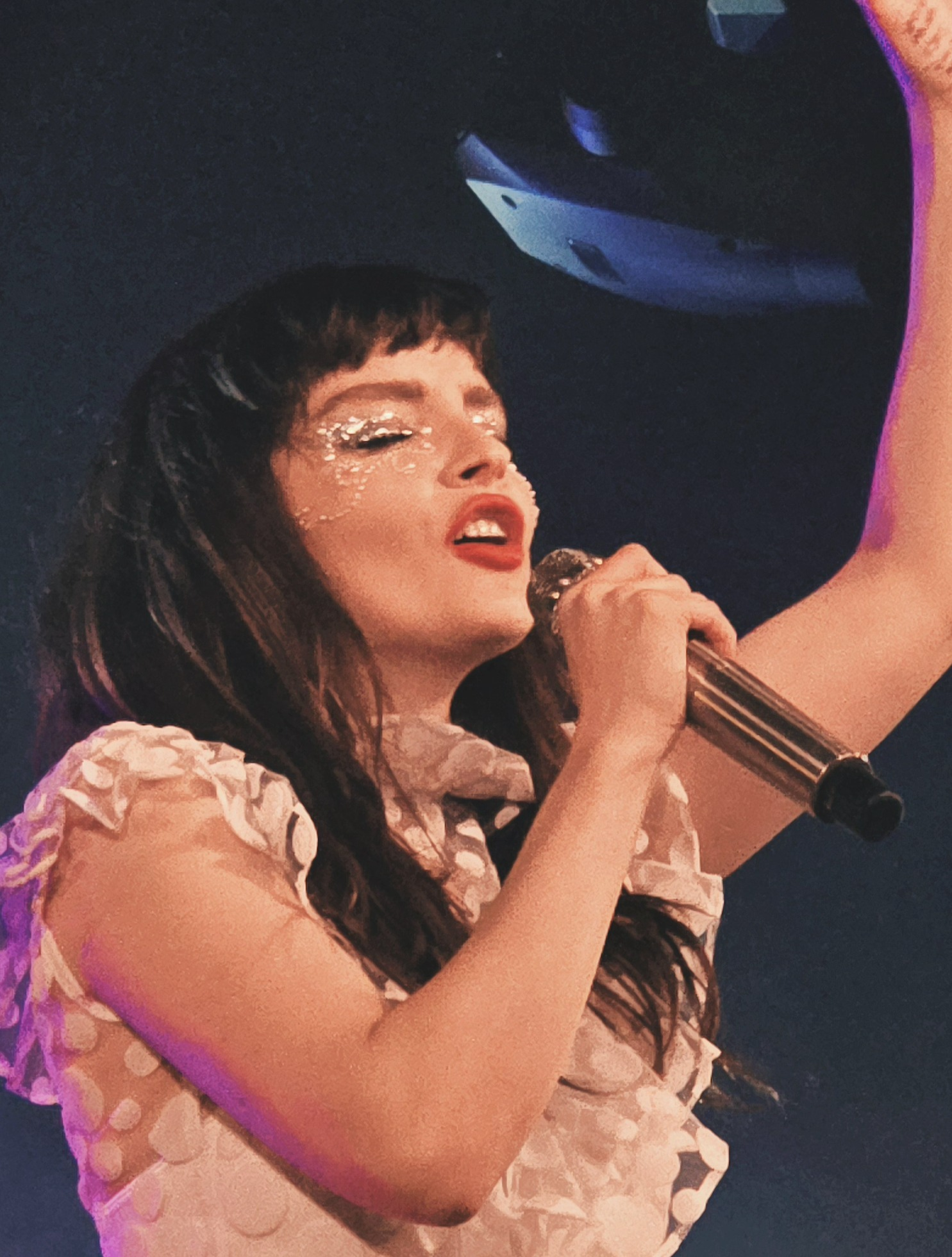
- Mayberry performing in 2024
- Born: Lauren Eve Mayberry; 7 October 1987 (age 39); Kirkintilloch, Dunbartonshire, Scotland
- Education: University of Strathclyde
- Occupations: Singer; musician; songwriter; philanthropist
- Years active: 2003–present
- Works: Discography
- Awards: Full list
- Musical career
- Origin: Thornhill, Stirling, Scotland
- Genres: Synth-pop; electropop; indie pop; pop; indietronica
- Instruments: Vocals; drums; percussion; keyboards
- Labels: EMI; Island; Virgin; Goodbye; Glassnote
- Member of: Chvrches
- Formerly of: Blue Sky Archives; Boyfriend/Girlfriend
- Website: laurenmayberry.co.uk

Lauren Eve Mayberry (born 7 October 1987) is a Scottish musician and the lead vocalist and percussionist of the pop band Chvrches.

Mayberry has achieved commercial and critical success as a member of Chvrches; releasing four studio albums to date: The Bones of What You Believe (2013), Every Open Eye (2015), Love Is Dead (2018) and Screen Violence (2021). Their 2012 single and signature song, "The Mother We Share", won the Popjustice £20 Music Prize for Best Pop Song in 2013. In 2019, the band collaborated with Marshmello on the song "Here with Me", which was certified two-times platinum in the United States by the RIAA.

Chvrches began a hiatus in 2024, with Mayberry releasing her debut solo album Vicious Creature in December of that year through EMI and Island Records. On release, it reached number three on the Scottish Albums Chart. Away from music, Mayberry is a philanthropist and feminist activist.

== Early life and education ==
Mayberry was born on 7 October 1987 in Kirkintilloch, near Glasgow, and grew up in the village of Thornhill in Perthshire, Scotland. (Note: Thornhill is now part of the Stirling council area) She has played the piano since she was a child and drums since she was a teenager.

Mayberry attended Beaconhurst School (now known as Fairview International School), a private school in Bridge of Allan. She also lived for six months in Gladstone, Illinois, as a foreign-exchange student. After completing a four-year undergraduate law degree at the University of Strathclyde, she earned a master's degree in journalism in 2010, and won the Royal Environmental Health Institute for Scotland Journalism Award. This led her into a career in freelance journalism and production running. From 2009 to 2010 she was a contributor to the UK music website The Line of Best Fit.

== Career ==
=== Early career ===
From age 15 until 22, Mayberry played drums in various bands. She is a soprano. Prior to Chvrches, Mayberry was involved in two local bands, Boyfriend/Girlfriend and Blue Sky Archives. In Blue Sky Archives, she was a vocalist and played the drums and keyboards. As a member of Blue Sky Archives, Mayberry also covered the Rage Against the Machine song "Killing in the Name" which was released as a single.

=== CHVRCHES (2011–present) ===
In September 2011, Iain Cook of Aereogramme and The Unwinding Hours produced Blue Sky Archives' Triple A-Side EP. Cook started a new project with his friend Martin Doherty and asked Mayberry to sing on a couple of demos. They wrote together for seven or eight months in a basement studio in Glasgow. Cook, Mayberry and Doherty decided to form a new band after the sessions proved to be successful. The band chose the name CHVRCHES, using a Roman "v" to distinguish themselves from actual churches on internet searches.

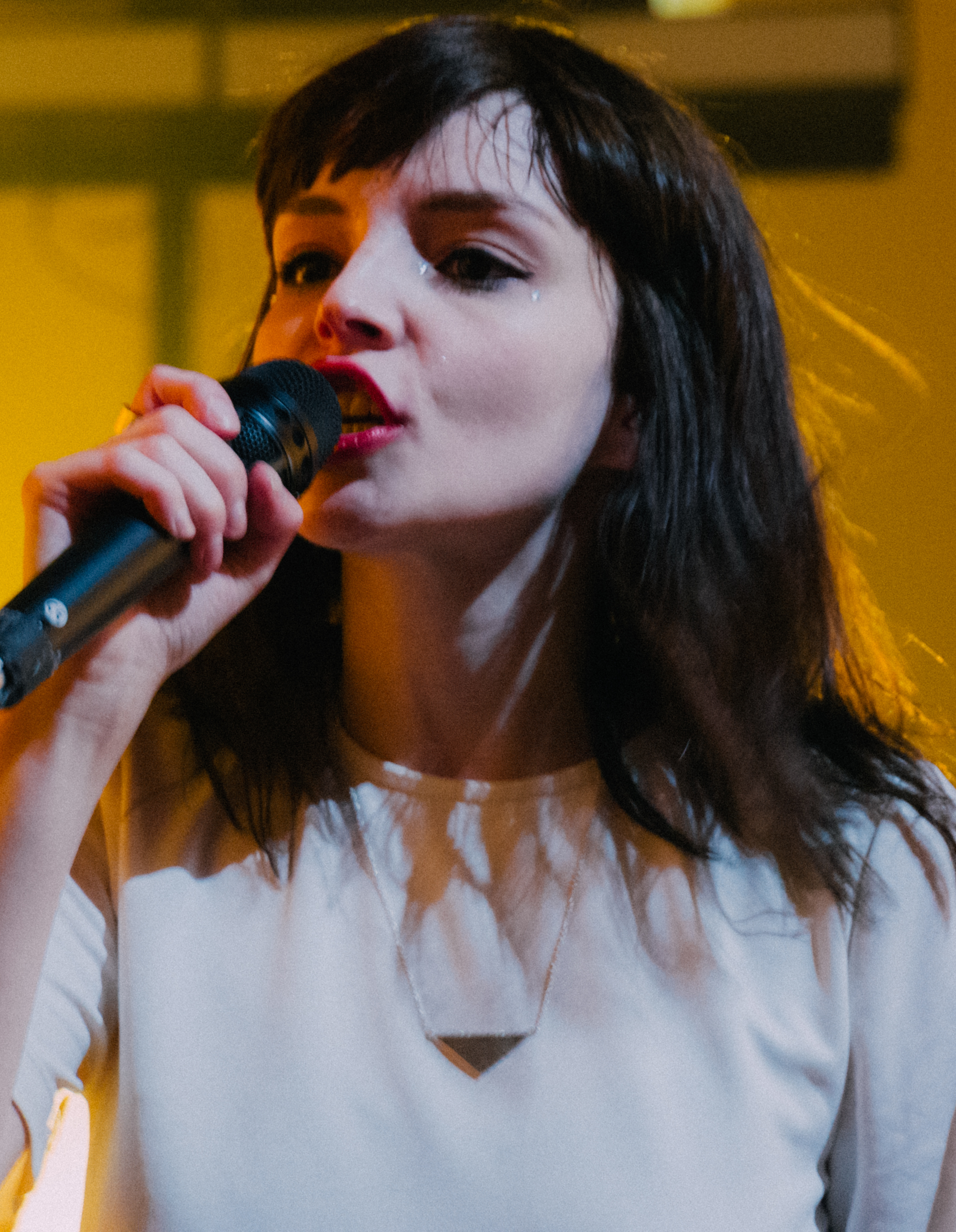
Mayberry performing with CHVRCHES in 2016

In 2013, the band signed to Glassnote Records after releasing the tracks "Lies" and "The Mother We Share" in 2012. Their debut EP, Recover, was released in 2013. The band released their debut album, The Bones of What You Believe, on 20 September 2013.

The band's 2021 album Screen Violence was made remotely, due to the COVID-19 pandemic. Mayberry has collaborated with artists such as Marshmello, Death Cab For Cutie, Bleachers, The National, the lead singer of Paramore, Hayley Williams, and The Cure's frontman, Robert Smith.

In 2018, Mayberry was featured on the cover of Vestal Magazine, and in October 2023 she was on the cover of DIY magazine. That same year Chvrches performed at BBC Radio 1's Biggest Weekend in Swansea.

=== Vicious Creature (2023–present) ===
In 2023, it was announced that Mayberry would be releasing solo material for the first time, which would be accompanied by a US and European/UK tour later in the year. She released her debut solo single, "Are You Awake?", on 1 September 2023. She co-wrote the song with award-winning Canadian songwriter Tobias Jesso Jr. This was followed by the singles "Shame", "Change Shapes", "Something in the Air" and "Crocodile Tears" over the next year.

Her debut album Vicious Creature was released on 6 December 2024, described as "more directly 'pop'" and "an eclectic set that ranges from acoustic guitar and piano ballads to 1980s- and 1990s-inspired dance anthems." The lyrics on album track "Oh, Mother" documents Mayberry's shifting relationship with her mother, whilst "Crocodile Tears" criticises emotionally manipulative men, reflecting Mayberry's perceived "need to please others at cost to herself."

In 2024, Mayberry was a special guest on the podcast Before They Knew Better. She is touring again in 2025, including the UK in March, although expecting to be back with Chvrches in 2026; to which she said 'We were very lucky. I hope there are more pages in that book.

== Activism and philanthropy ==
=== Feminism and women's rights ===
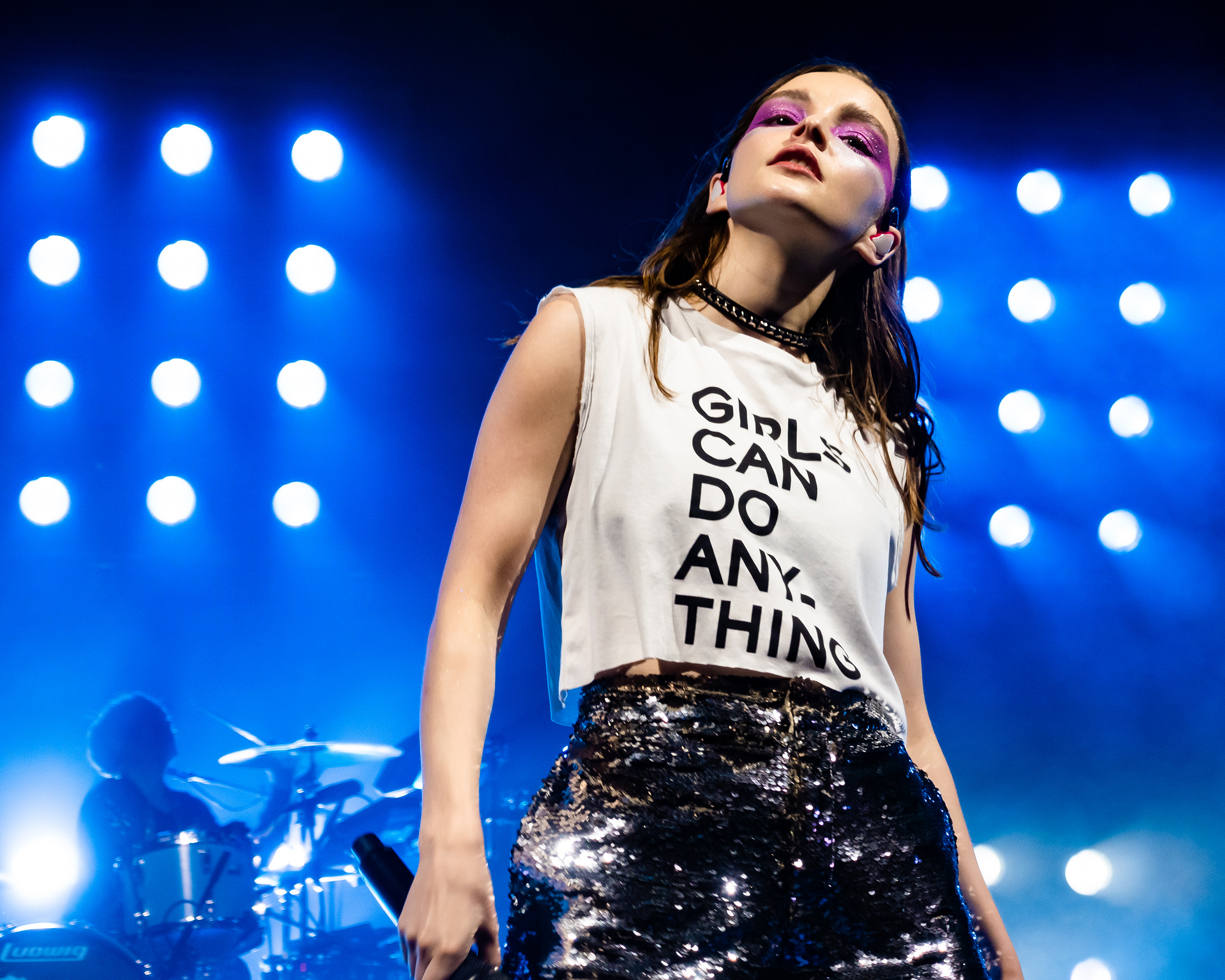
Mayberry performing with CHVRCHES at The Greek theatre in Griffith Park, Los Angeles in September 2018

Mayberry is a vocal feminist and is the founder of TYCI, a feminist collective in Glasgow. Her ongoing work with the organisation includes written contributions to the online magazine and blog, and she can be heard regularly on TYCI podcasts. The group also holds live events, raising money for charities like Glasgow Women's Aid, and produced a radio show. Mayberry believes it helps fans who wish to find out to know 'where she stands' on issues, rather than 'a slanging match online".

In September 2013, Mayberry wrote an article for The Guardian in response to misogynist messages she received online. She wrote:

"What I do not accept ... is that it is all right for people to make comments ranging from 'a bit sexist but generally harmless' to openly sexually aggressive. That it is something that 'just happens'. Is the casual sexual objectification of women so commonplace that we should all just suck it up, roll over and accept defeat? I hope not. Objectification, whatever its form, is not something anyone should have to 'just deal with'."

She discussed the issue again in a Talks at Google session in 2014 and on Channel 4 News, following aggressive responses to the band's video for "Leave a Trace". In 2024, she explored the impact that online abuse has on artists in a 15-minute BBC Radio 6 Music documentary, titled Lauren Mayberry: I Change Shapes, which was released on BBC iPlayer as part of the Change The Tune initiative.

Mayberry is a patron of Rape Crisis Glasgow and has been involved with other organisations such as WaterAid, Yellow Bird Project, Wild Aid and Plus 1, donating a portion of Chvrches' ticket sales to Amnesty International. She has also been involved with Glasgow's Rock School For Girls and Amy Poehler's Smart Girls.

In 2015, Mayberry wrote about an abusive personal relationship for Jenni Konner and Lena Dunham's Lenny Letter. In December 2016, Mayberry took part in a fundraiser show with Carly Rae Jepsen, Lorde and Charli XCX for the Ally Coalition, an organisation started by Jack Antonoff to raise money for homeless LGBT youth.

In 2018, Mayberry discussed the #MeToo movement during a BBC interview and explained how she was skeptical that much had changed:

"It's great that people are waking up and having that conversation, but it has to be more than a symbolic gesture," she says. Yes, it's great that you kicked Harvey Weinstein out of the Academy but Roman Polanski's still in there, Woody Allen's still in there, Bill Cosby's still in there. People wear white roses at the Grammy Awards to show they stand with these things - but then you look at the show, and you look at the content of it, and you look at the people in the room, and you're like, 'Oh, nothing has changed.'"

In 2019, she criticised former CHVRCHES collaborator Marshmello for working with Chris Brown, who had admitted assaulting his then girlfriend Rihanna in 2009. Mayberry wrote on Instagram that "working with people who are predators and abusers enables, excuses and ultimately tacitly endorses that behaviour." In a 2025 interview, Mayberry said, 'As a woman in the world, there are things you know to be afraid of'.

=== Charity ===
In 2020, during the COVID-19 pandemic, Mayberry performed as part of the For The Love Of Scotland live stream fundraiser which aimed to get Personal Protective Equipment to key workers in Scotland.

=== Accolades ===
In 2024, she was awarded an honorary degree from the University of Strathclyde.

=== United States politics ===
Mayberry has been an outspoken critic of the Trump administration and has attributed his presidency with the rise of global activism for social issues, calling him "an unpunished sexual predator in office." Referring to the mixed reaction by the crowd to a Trump joke she told at a concert, Mayberry said "you can't say you don't think he's a racist. You can't say you don't think he's a sexist. You can't say you don't think he's transphobic and homophobic, 'cause he has shown us who he is."

Mayberry is a staunch advocate for gun control in the United States. Following the Sutherland Springs church shooting, Mayberry released a video recounting her memory of the Dunblane massacre in which 16 children and one teacher were murdered with handguns, resulting in sweeping gun control legislation in the UK. Mayberry credits these efforts with substantially decreasing the number of mass shootings in the UK.

== Personal life ==
As of 2020, Mayberry lived in Los Angeles. She has two cats named Cactus and Poppy.

Mayberry and actor Justin Long have engaged in multiple philanthropic activities together, including hosting a holiday variety show charity fundraiser at The Fonda Theatre in Los Angeles and travelling together to Nicaragua to visit a women's shelter. In May 2018, The Guardian identified Long as Mayberry's boyfriend. Mayberry subsequently suggested that these claims were false. In September 2018, People reported that Long had split from Mayberry, "whom he began dating in 2016". During an interview with Rolling Stone in October 2018, Mayberry indicated that she was single.

In 2019, Mayberry met her current boyfriend, Sam Stewart, when his band Lo Moon were opening for Chvrches. Sam is the son of Eurythmics member Dave Stewart.

In 2021, Mayberry's likeness was used in deepfake pornography. About the situation, she said "Even though people say 'It's not real, it's not real' Your brain does not perceive that, I don't think. The impact of it on your psychology, it doesn't really matter whether you think that's real."

== Discography ==
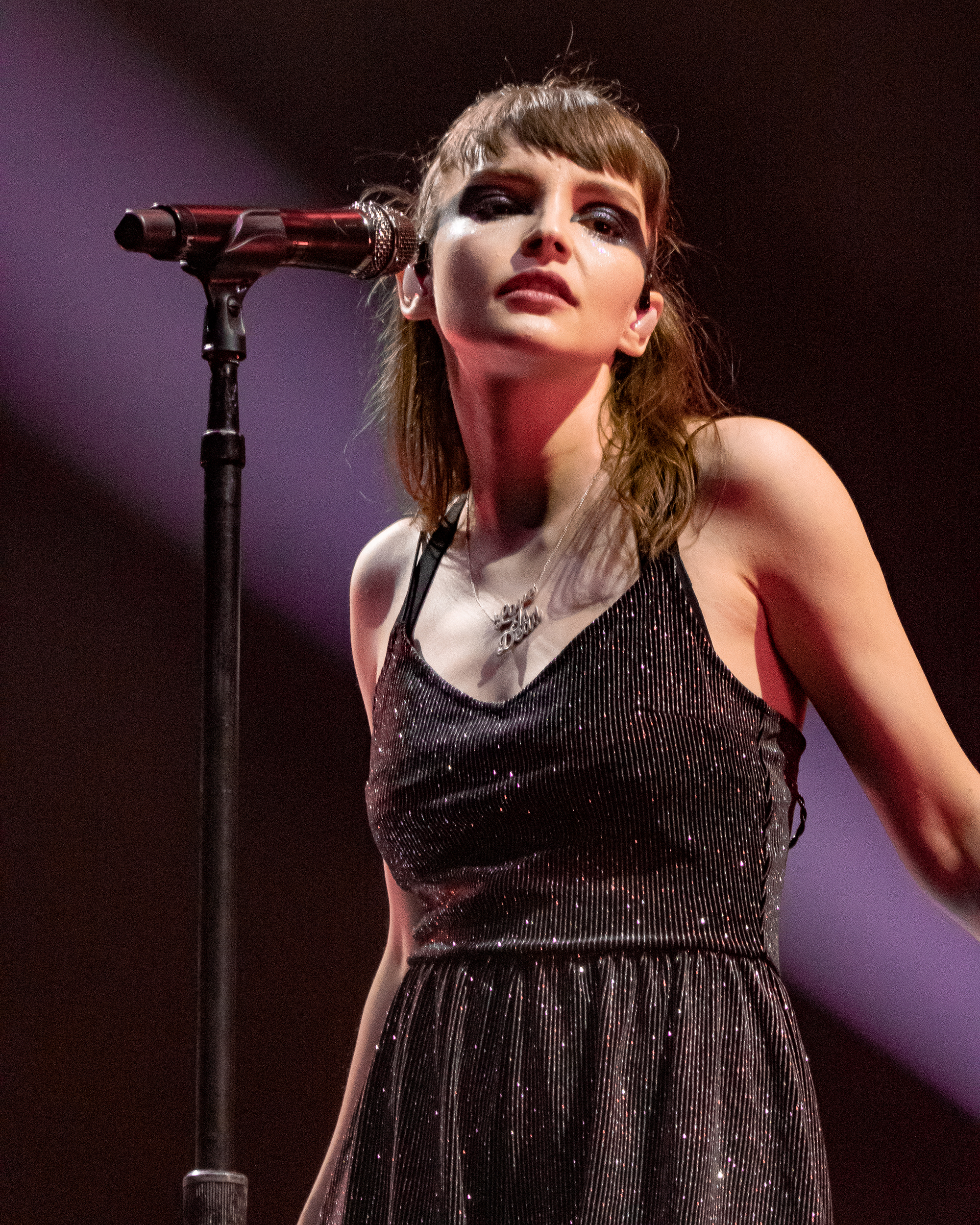
Mayberry performing with Chvrches in 2019

Solo

- Vicious Creature (2024)

With Boyfriend/Girlfriend

- Kill Music EP (2007)
- Optimism EP (2008)

With Blue Sky Archives

- Blue Sky Archives EP (2010)
- Plural EP (2011)
- "Killing in the Name" (2011)
- Triple A-Side EP (2012)

With Chvrches

- The Bones of What You Believe (2013)
- Every Open Eye (2015)
- Love Is Dead (2018)
- Screen Violence (2021)

As a featured artist

- "Northern Lights" by Death Cab For Cutie (2018)
- "Ashamed ft/ Lauren Mayberry" by HEALTH (2024)
