= Gun (song) =

Single by CHVRCHES

from the album The Bones of What You Believe
- Released: 15 July 2013
- Genre: Synth-pop
- Length: 3:53
- Label: Virgin; Goodbye
- Songwriters: Iain Cook; Martin Doherty; Lauren Mayberry
- Producer: Chvrches

CHVRCHES singles chronology
"Recover" (2013)	"Gun" (2013)	"The Mother We Share" (2013)

Music video
- "Gun" on YouTube

"Gun" is a song by Scottish synth-pop band Chvrches from their 2013 debut album The Bones of What You Believe. It was released as the band's third official single on 15 June 2013 via Virgin and Goodbye Records.

== Release history ==
"Gun" debuted on Zane Lowe's BBC Radio 1 show on 27 May 2013. It was later streamed on the band's official SoundCloud page.

The song was first available on the Japan-only EP on 10 July. The single was released 15 July in the United Kingdom as a download and 12" pink vinyl. A Gun (Remixes) EP, featuring four remixes by various artists, was also released along with a promotional single on 11 July.

== Critical reception ==
The song received positive reviews. Amrit Singh of Stereogum described the song as "great, hook-y fodder for dusk at a summer festival side-stage, the sort of infectious, female-fronted empowerment jam that could catch you off guard while walking from one big act to another, and make you a fan." Jamie Milton of This Is Fake DIY described the song as "the sound of a band honing their craft when they could have stuck to one winning formula," noting the differences in mood and lyrics compared to the band's previous tracks "Lies" and "Recover".

Ian Cohen of Pitchfork called the song "brilliantly major-key without being cloying, extroverted without coming on too strong, synthetic but not stiff and metaphoric without being impressed with its own cleverness."

Robin Murray of Clash described the song as "compact, effortlessly catchy and stylish as hell ... as usual, though, there's a dark side with Lauren Mayberry intoning the lyrics." Robert Leedham of Drowned in Sound interpreted the lyrics as "an intention to emotionally dismember a former beau," writing: "it is far too catchy to be taken as a terror-inducing threat; its fizzing splendour will slay your ears."

== Music video ==
A music video for the song was released on 14 June 2013.

== Track listing ==
All tracks are written by Chvrches.

Vinyl edition
No.	Title	Length
1.	"Gun"	3:53
2.	"Gun" (Auntie Flo Remix)	5:53
3.	"Gun" (KDA Remix)	4:37
4.	"Gun" (DJ Helix Remix)	4:08

Gun (Remixes) EP
No.	Title	Length
1.	"Gun"	3:53
2.	"Gun" (Jamie Isaac Remix)	4:04
3.	"Gun" (Auntie Flo Remix)	5:53
4.	"Gun" (Groundislava Remix)	5:43
5.	"Gun" (DJ Helix Remix)	4:08

Gun promotional single
No.	Title	Length
1.	"Gun"	3:54
2.	"Gun" (Instrumental)	3:54

== Personnel ==
Chvrches

- Lauren Mayberry – lead vocals, additional synthesizers, production
- Iain Cook – synthesizers, guitar, bass, vocals, production
- Martin Doherty – synthesizers, samplers, vocals, production

Other personnel

- Rich Costey – mixing
- Jonny Scott – drums

== Chart positions ==
Chart (2013)	Peak Position
Japan Hot 100	82
UK singles chart	55

== Remixes ==
The song was remixed by various musicians, including Venice, California-based producer Groundislava and musician Jamie Isaac. Both remixes received positive reviews. Larry Fitzmaurice of Pitchfork praised the Groundislava remix, stating that "he has taken the tune and ratcheted up the energy to maximal level, to the point where it resembles something approaching Unicorn Kid's own rave-revivalist creations."

On the Jamie Isaac remix, Michael Cragg of The Guardian stated that Jamie Isaac "strips the song back to its bare bones while is augmenting the central beat by simple handclaps, adds in his own backing vocals, tweaks everything to make it seem oddly sinister and just lets it all simmer gently."
