= Vicious Creature =

Studio album by Lauren Mayberry
- Released: 6 December 2024
- Recorded: 2022–2024
- Studio: Shed (London); Dry Snack Sound (Los Angeles); Good Luck (Los Angeles); Glenwood (Glasgow); No Expectations (Hollywood)
- Genre: Pop
- Length: 39:47
- Label: EMI; Island
- Producer: Dan McDougall; Matthew Koma; Ethan Gruska; Greg Kurstin

Singles from Vicious Creature
- 1. "Are You Awake?" Released: 1 September 2023; 2. "Shame" Released: 10 October 2023; 3. "Change Shapes" Released: 8 March 2024; 4. "Something in the Air" Released: 1 October 2024; 5. "Crocodile Tears" Released: 29 October 2024

Vicious Creature is the debut solo studio album by Scottish singer and musician Lauren Mayberry, released on 6 December 2024 by EMI Records. After four albums as the lead singer of synth-pop band Chvrches since 2011, Mayberry announced in 2023 that she would be pursuing a solo project. Work on the album started in early 2022, with Mayberry citing Fiona Apple, Tori Amos, PJ Harvey, Annie Lennox, Jenny Lewis, Sinéad O'Connor as influences.

Lyrically, the album discusses mortality, societal pressure, personal growth, and sexism in the music industry. Mayberry co-wrote every song on the album, along with its producers Dan McDougall, Matthew Koma, Ethan Gruska, and Greg Kurstin; additional songwriters include Tobias Jesso Jr., Caroline Pennell, and Griffin Goldsmith. Vicious Creature has received favourable reviews from critics and was supported by five singles: "Are You Awake?", "Shame", "Change Shapes", "Something in the Air", and "Crocodile Tears".

== Background ==
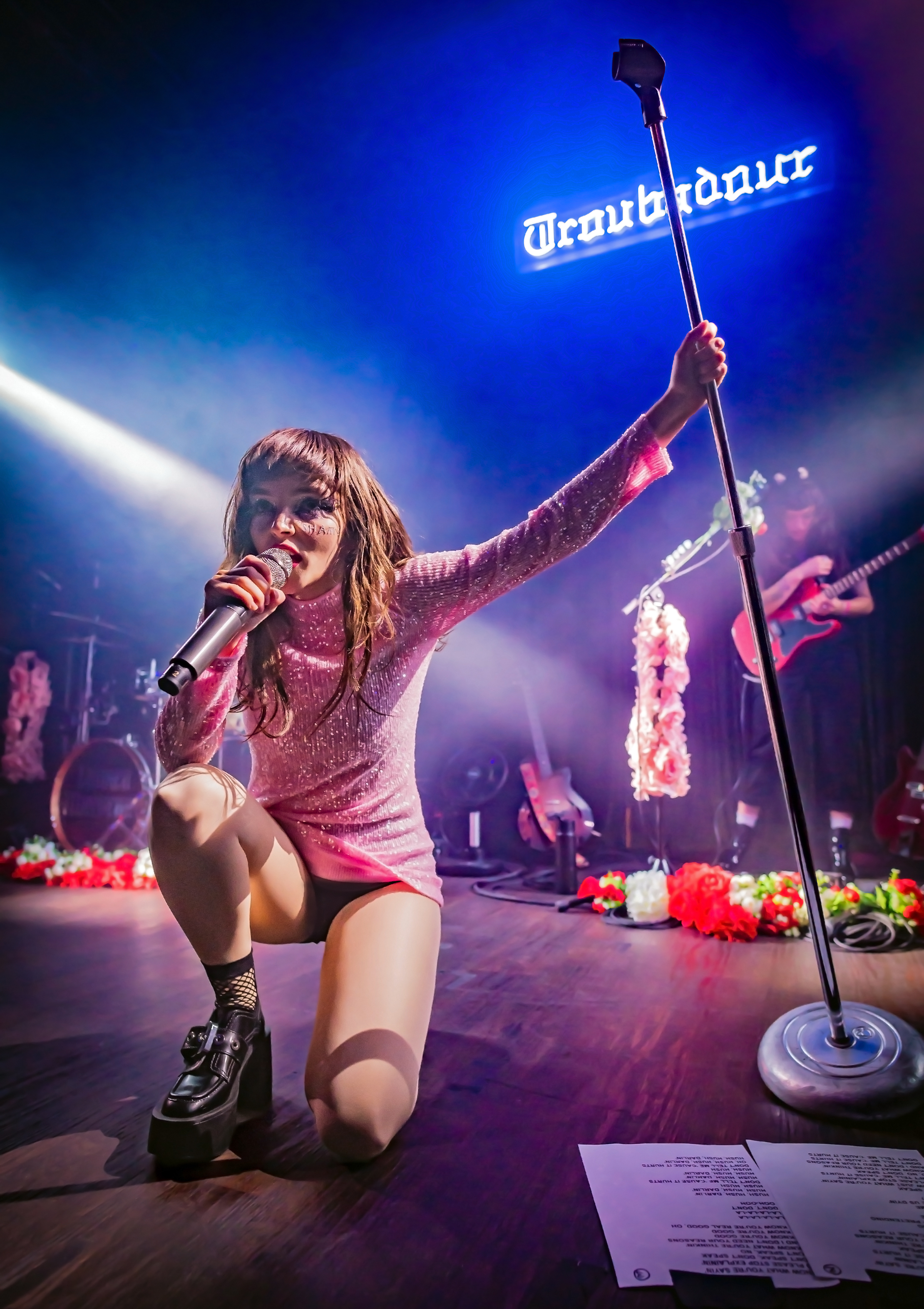
Mayberry performing on her solo tour in 2023

Mayberry has been the lead singer of synth-pop group Chvrches since 2011, and first considered a solo career following the band's third studio album, Love Is Dead (2018). The band's first two studio albums, The Bones of What You Believe (2013) and Every Open Eye (2015), were both critical successes but reception to Love Is Dead was more mixed. Mayberry expressed feeling afraid that her band would not stay together, and was also worried that she had no other creative outlet, as bandmates Iain Cook and Martin Doherty were both working with other artists. The COVID-19 pandemic caused the band to work on a follow-up album remotely: 2021's Screen Violence. In early 2022, she told her bandmates that she wanted to work on a solo project. In July 2023, Mayberry announced she would be pursuing a solo career, and embarked on a solo tour of the US and Europe later that year, where she previewed her solo songs. Initial plans were for an album to be released in 2023, but it faced delays partly due to a restructuring at Universal and their licensing disagreement with TikTok.

Writing for the album started in early 2022, and "Are You Awake?" was released as the first single on 1 September 2023. In an interview with NME, Mayberry revealed that her solo music was "born out of things that [she] couldn't or wouldn't write in the band", including sentiments she felt as the group's only female member. In an interview with The Line of Best Fit in October 2024, Mayberry revealed that Vicious Creature was finished and was due for release later in the year. The album was announced on 29 October 2024 and released five weeks later on 6 December. Over 40 songs were written for the album, whose title is taken from a line in "A Work of Fiction".

== Composition ==
Vicious Creature comprises 12 songs with a variety of genres and influences. "Something in the Air" is a pop rock track that arose after a studio discussion about conspiracy theories; it was the penultimate song written for the album and has a similar sound to All Saints and Alanis Morissette. "Crocodile Tears", which was inspired by the musical theatre characters of Velma Kelly (of Chicago) and Sally Bowles (of Cabaret), samples the strings from "Walking on Broken Glass" by Annie Lennox. "Shame", the album's second single, is an electropop song that discusses feelings of hypocrisy and schizophrenia. "Anywhere but Dancing" is a "guitar-country" song about a failed relationship, while "Punch Drunk" mixes punk with new wave and electronica.

"Oh, Mother", a piano ballad about Mayberry's relationship with her mother, was inspired by an illness in the family and was the last song written for Vicious Creature. "Sorry, Etc", a blend of garage rock and drum and bass, and the pop "Change Shapes" are both songs that discuss sexism in the music industry; the latter was released as a single to coincide with International Women's Day. "Mantra" is an art pop track while "A Work of Fiction" is a pop song backed by piano. "Sunday Best", inspired by Talking Heads and "Everybody's Free (To Wear Sunscreen)" by Baz Luhrmann, is a song describing an existential crisis over worrying about the death of one's parents. The start of the track is an homage to Fatboy Slim's "Praise You". "Are You Awake?" is a piano ballad inspired by being homesick and lonely.

== Critical reception ==
Professional ratings
Aggregate scores
Source	Rating
AnyDecentMusic?	6.7/10
Metacritic	71/100
Review scores
Source	Rating
AllMusic	4/5 stars
Clash	7/10
DIY	4/5 stars
Dork	5/5 stars
The Guardian	3/5 stars 4/5 stars
The Irish Times	3.5/5 stars
MusicOMH	3.5/5 stars
NME	3/5 stars
Rolling Stone Germany	3.5/5 stars
Slant Magazine	3/5 stars

According to the review aggregator Metacritic, Vicious Creature received "generally favorable reviews" based on a weighted average score of 71 out of 100 from twelve critic scores. Sam Walker-Smart of Clash praised Mayberry's ability to sound contemporary while being influenced by 1990s pop music.

== Track listing ==
Vicious Creature track listing
No.	Title	Writer(s)	Producer(s)	Length
1.	"Something in the Air"	Lauren Mayberry; Dan McDougall	McDougall	3:47
2.	"Crocodile Tears"	Mayberry; Matthew Koma; Ethan Gruska	Koma; Gruska	3:23
3.	"Shame"	Mayberry; Koma; Caroline Pennell; Griffin Goldsmith	Koma	2:34
4.	"Anywhere but Dancing"	Mayberry; McDougall	McDougall	3:47
5.	"Punch Drunk"	Mayberry; McDougall; Wølffe	McDougall	2:48
6.	"Oh, Mother"	Mayberry; McDougall	McDougall	4:03
7.	"Sorry, Etc"	Mayberry; Koma	Koma	2:06
8.	"Change Shapes"	Mayberry; Evan Blair; Cleo Tighe; Koma	Koma	3:25
9.	"Mantra"	Mayberry; Koma; Gruska	Koma; Gruska	3:26
10.	"A Work of Fiction"	Mayberry; Gruska	Gruska	2:20
11.	"Sunday Best"	Mayberry; Greg Kurstin	Kurstin	4:18
12.	"Are You Awake?"	Mayberry; Tobias Jesso Jr.; Koma	Koma	3:44

== Personnel ==
Musicians

- Lauren Mayberry – vocals
- Dan McDougall – piano, synthesisers (tracks 1, 4–6); electric guitar (1, 4, 5), bass (1, 5, 6); drum programming, drums (1, 5); percussion, backing vocals (1); acoustic guitar (4)
- Samuel Stewart – slide guitar (track 1), electric guitar (5)
- Griffin Goldsmith – drums (tracks 2, 3, 7–9, 12), background vocals (2), percussion (2)
- Matthew Koma – programming (tracks 2, 7, 9), bass (2); keyboards, guitar (3, 8, 12)
- Ethan Gruska – bass, drum programming, keyboards, percussion, strings, synthesisers (track 2); all instruments (10)
- Paul Gallagher – bass (track 7)
- Greg Kurstin – drums, bass, piano, synthesisers, Mellotron, percussion, strings (track 11)
- Brad Goodall – additional keyboards (track 12)
- Taylor Goldsmith – piano (track 12)

Technical

- Gavin Lurssen – mastering
- Mark "Spike" Stent – mixing
- Greg Kurstin – engineering (track 11)
- Julian Burg – engineering (track 11)
- Matt Tuggle – engineering (track 11)
- Matthew Koma – string arrangement (track 12)
- Samuel Stewart – additional recording and engineering (tracks 1, 5)
- Paul Gallagher – additional recording and engineering (track 7)
- Matt Wolach – mixing assistance
- Kieran Beardmore – mixing assistance

Visuals

- Palice Studio – creative direction
- Scarlett Casciello – photography
- Aidan Cochrane – design

== Charts ==
Chart performance for Vicious Creature
Chart (2024)	Peak position
Scottish Albums (OCC)	3
UK Albums (OCC)	49
