= Leave a Trace =

Single by Chvrches

from the album Every Open Eye
- Released: 17 July 2015
- Recorded: 2015
- Genre: Synth-pop; new wave
- Length: 3:57
- Label: Virgin; Goodbye
- Songwriters: Iain Cook; Martin Doherty; Lauren Mayberry
- Producer: Chvrches

Chvrches singles chronology
"Tether" (2015)	"Leave a Trace" (2015)	"Never Ending Circles" (2015)

Music video
- "Leave A Trace" on YouTube

"Leave a Trace" is a song by Scottish synth-pop band Chvrches from their second studio album Every Open Eye. It was released as the band's first official single on 17 July 2015 via Virgin and Goodbye Records.

== Background ==
During an interview with Pitchfork, Lauren Mayberry said of the song:

"Leave a Trace" is the middle finger mic-drop. It's about that point where you're like, "There's no point having this conversation anyways: There will be no resolve, I won't feel better about it, you won't feel better about it, no outcome from this will actually change my reality". It makes me feel better to write about that—I've done something constructive with it. You don't put that on other people, you put that into what you do. That's always the way I've written lyrics. My ex-partners are not friends with me, but I'm OK with that.

== Release history ==
"Leave a Trace" was streamed on the band's official SoundCloud page.

== Critical reception ==
The song received generally positive reviews. Luke Winstanley of Clash called the song "another highlight, outrageously infectious and immediate, all centred around a gentle but persistent bass pulse." Sam Shepherd of MusicOMH felt it "finds Mayberry certain of her feelings and finding closure, and delivering a sweet vocal that drills deep into the pleasure centres." Abby Johnston of The Austin Chronicle called Mayberry's performance in the song "at the level of a modern-day Cyndi Lauper."

Rolling Stone placed "Leave a Trace" at number 24 on its list of the 50 Best Songs of 2015. Billboard ranked "Leave a Trace" at number fourteen on its year-end list: "On 'Leave a Trace', Iain Cook and Martin Doherty's fine-tuned swirls of synthesizer are just begging for a killer hook, and Mayberry -- singing with more swagger than ever before -- hammers it home."

== Music video ==
=== Background ===
A music video for the song was released on 17 August 2015.

Consequence of Sound said of the music video:

In the atmospheric video for "Leave A Trace", Lauren Mayberry takes center stage and proves yet again why she's quickly risen the ranks among indie's foremost frontwomen. Confident yet vulnerable, seductive yet fierce, Mayberry refuses to be pigeonholed into one singular personality. It's all the more striking when considering she's spent the last year fighting back against Internet trolls for sexist and misogynistic comments. Mayberry can be sexy, but she can also kick your ass.

=== 4chan harassment ===
On 17 August 2015, a user on internet forum 4chan posted a link to the music video to /mu/, 4chan's music board. Hundreds of comments followed, many of which were sexually explicit remarks and such sexist slurs as "slut", "whore", and "bitch" directed toward Mayberry. Other comments called Mayberry a hypocrite for her solo appearance in the video while concurrently being an outspoken feminist and expressing her disdain for the objectification of women.

One participant in the thread tweeted at Mayberry, requesting her input. Mayberry blocked the user and responded to the thread in her own tweet, writing "Dear anyone who thinks misogyny isn't real. It is and this is what it looks like", with a link to the 4chan thread. Mayberry's bandmates defended her in a tweet from the band's account, writing "PSA: apparently wet hair makes you a 'slut'. Nice work, 4chan / humanity."

French scholar Albin Wagener studied this specific case in a scientific paper, showing how online discrimination was organized in online forums, when related to sexism.

== Track listing ==
All tracks are written by Chvrches.

Vinyl edition
No.	Title	Length
1.	"Leave a Trace" (Radio edit)	3:34
2.	"Leave a Trace" (Album version)	3:57
3.	"Leave a Trace" (Instrumental)	3:57

== Charts ==
=== Weekly charts ===
Chart (2015)	Peak position
Australia (ARIA)	64
Australia Hitseekers (ARIA)	3
Belgium (Ultratip Bubbling Under Flanders)	37
Canada Rock (Billboard)	27
Japan Hot 100 (Billboard)	95
Switzerland Airplay (Swiss Hitparade)	82
UK Singles (Official Charts Company)	107
US Hot Singles Sales (Billboard)	15
US Hot Rock & Alternative Songs (Billboard)	17
US Alternative Airplay (Billboard)	19
US Rock & Alternative Airplay (Billboard)	23

=== Year-end charts ===
Chart (2015)	Position
US Hot Rock Songs (Billboard)	86
