= He Said She Said (Chvrches song) =

Single by Chvrches

from the album Screen Violence
- Released: 19 April 2021
- Genre: Synth-pop; electropop
- Length: 3:09
- Label: Glassnote
- Songwriters: Lauren Mayberry; Iain Cook; Martin Doherty
- Producer: Chvrches

Chvrches singles chronology
| "Death Stranding" (2019) | "He Said She Said" (2021) | "How Not to Drown" (2021) |

Music video
- "He Said She Said" on YouTube

"He Said She Said" is a song recorded, written and produced by Scottish synth-pop band Chvrches. The song was released on 19 April 2021, as the lead single of their fourth studio album, Screen Violence.

== Background and composition ==
During an interview with DIY, vocalist Lauren Mayberry revealed that the band started working on their fourth studio album in February 2020. About the song writing theme of the album, Mayberry said that it was about "the marriage between the stuff that's purely personal, and the stuff that's more imagery, and narrative." The group worked on the track during the COVID-19 pandemic quarantine. Iain Cook worked on it from Glasgow while Mayberry and Martin Doherty worked on it from Los Angeles. Mayberry noted that the song was the first track that the band wrote in the project.

The track was inspired by Mayberry's experiences of sexism. Mayberry described the track as her "way of reckoning with things she had accepted that she knew she shouldn't have". "Being a woman is fucking exhausting and it felt better to scream it into a pop song than scream it into the void. After the past year, I think we can all relate to feeling like we're losing our minds," she continued.

== Release ==
The band teased new music with multiple cryptic and video diary posts on Instagram throughout the previous week of the track release. The track premiered on BBC Radio 1's Future Sounds with Annie Mac.

== Critical reception ==
Jem Aswad of Variety described the track as "anti-mansplaining". He further commended the synth-heavy sound also noted the solid hooks and "keening" keyboards. Margaret Farrell of Flood Magazine described the song as a "perfect concoction of shimmery melodies and thorny aggravation." Tina Benitez-Eves of American Songwriter called it as an "empowerment" track and stated that the track "prods some of the voices that can make a women questions her part in it all", especially in the refrain: "Feel like I'm losing my mind".

== Music video ==
The video was released on 22 April 2021. It was directed by multi-disciplinary artist Scott Kiernan. It featured glitched-out visuals of the band, also a "metaphorical" and "dramatically lit" revolving door throughout the video. About the use of revolving door, Kiernan explained that it was a "metaphorical to the circular nature of a manipulative power dynamic, and the looping thoughts that go along with feeling trapped in it." He further stated that the door also represented the film developing tank which was portrayed in the video. "[The film developing tank] creates 'a picture' through agitation. That agitation can be malevolent, by some controlling, dominating force as in an abusive relationship, or it can be that of a protest – a positive force to reclaim one's agency," he continued. Chvrches discovered Kiernan through his short film created for American company Moog Music and were "obsessed" with the aesthetic and story telling. They also teased Kiernan as their creative director on the upcoming album.

== Charts ==
Weekly chart performance for "He Said She Said"
| Chart (2021) | Peak position |
|---|---|
| Czech Republic Airplay (ČNS IFPI) | 53 |
| Mexico Ingles Airplay (Billboard) | 22 |
| UK Singles Downloads (Official Charts) | 63 |
| US Alternative Airplay (Billboard) | 20 |
| US Hot Rock & Alternative Songs (Billboard) | 37 |
