= Miami-Dade County Fair & Exposition =

Fairgrounds in Florida, US

Coordinates: 25.7469°N 80.3734°W

The Miami-Dade County Fair & Exposition is a 21-day event featuring agricultural and educational exhibits, midway rides, concerts, carnival food and games. It has been held on the fairgrounds at Tamiami Park since 1972.

== Entertainment ==
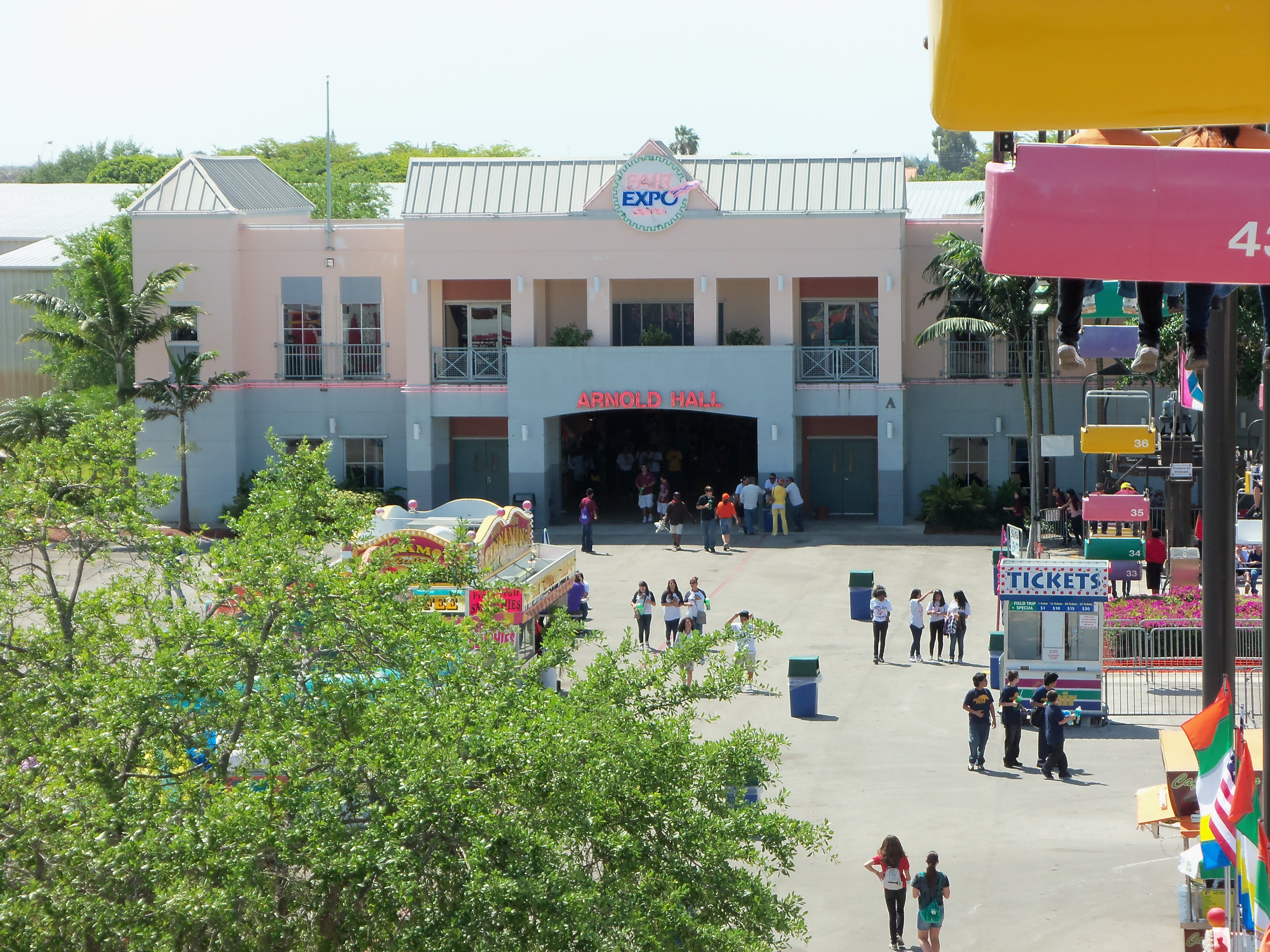
The Fair Expo Center.

In 2018, the Mainstreet Stage was host to Gente de Zona, Ginuwine, La Addictiva Banda San José de Mesillas, La Maquinaria Norteña, Lecrae, Nelly, The Sugarhill Gang, and TLC.

In 2017, the Mainstreet Stage was host to Skillet, Jacob Forever, Carlos Daniels and J. Alvarez. Luis Enrique served as Grand Marshall of the Opening Day Parade.

In 2016, the Mainstreet Stage was host to Village People, MercyMe, Jessie James Decker, La Salsa Vive, Oscar D'Leon, Hansel, Sonora Carruseles, Tavares, and "Celebrating Celia Cruz" with performances by Willy Chirino, Aymee Nuviola, Jeimy Osorio and the Celia Cruz All Stars.

In 2015, the Mainstreet Stage hosted: Kool & The Gang, Music from the '80s with Shannon, Judy Torres, Johnny O and Nice & Wild.

In 2014, the Mainstreet Stage hosted: Music from the '90s with Cynthia, Rockell, Noel and TKA; Mr. Nice Guy Band; Los Tres de La Habana and Timbalive; Willy Chirino; Albita; Sonic Flood; Matthew West.

In 2013, the Mainstreet Stage hosted: "We Are the In Crowd"; Kidz Bop; Gocho; Matt Hunter.

In 2011, concerts included Mr. C & The Cha Cha Slide, Chino Y Nacho, Luis Enrique, FCW Stars & WWE Wrestling, Sid the Science Kid, The Ready Set, Natalie Grant, Jerry Rivera, The Dirty Sock Funtime Band, Paper Tongues, and Ricky C.

== Scholarships ==
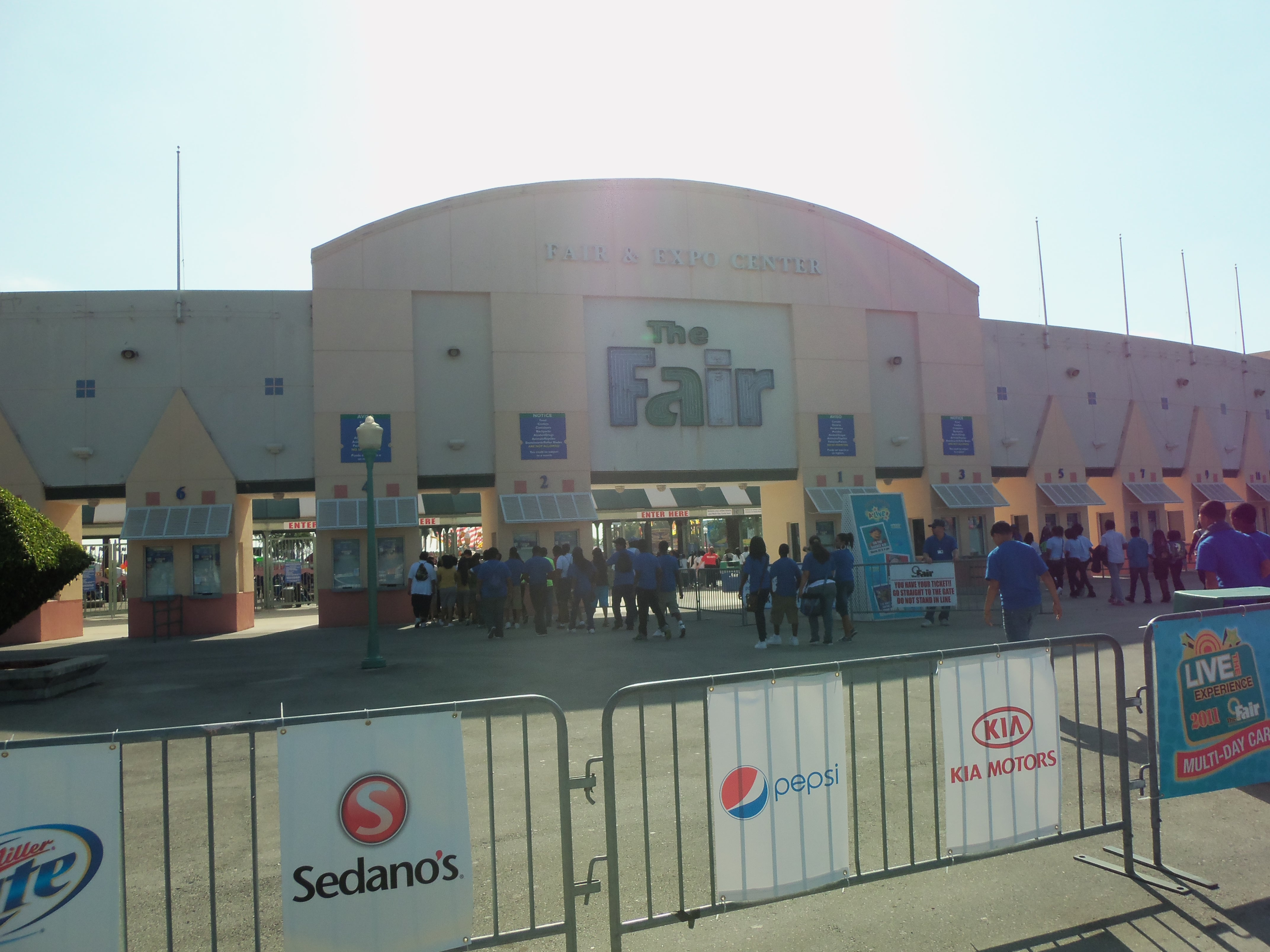
Entrance

The fair has presented more than eleven million dollars' worth of college scholarships, cash premiums and awards to Miami-Dade students since 1972.

In 2018, its scholarship program awarded 182 non-renewable $1,000 competitive scholarships to students graduating from public schools, charter schools, private schools, vocational schools, alternative education and home schooling. The fund also awards scholarships to the winners of Elie Wiesel Foundation for Humanity Prize in Ethics essay contest for Miami-Dade County Public high school juniors and seniors.

== Land Issue ==
In 2013, Miami-Dade County began discussing the possibility relocating the SIPO for Florida International University's campus expansion.

== See also ==
- Santa's Enchanted Forest
- Rapids Water Park
- South Florida Fair
