= Clearest Blue =

2015 single by Chvrches

Single by Chvrches

from the album Every Open Eye
- Released: 10 September 2015
- Recorded: 2015
- Genre: Synth-pop; house; new wave
- Length: 3:53
- Label: Virgin; Goodbye
- Songwriters: Iain Cook; Martin Doherty; Lauren Mayberry
- Producer: Chvrches

Chvrches singles chronology
"Never Ending Circles" (2015)	"Clearest Blue" (2015)	"Empty Threat" (2015)

Music video
- "Clearest Blue" on YouTube

"Clearest Blue" is a song by the Scottish synth-pop band Chvrches and the third single from the band's second studio album, Every Open Eye.

== Background ==
While talking about the origins of the song on the Song Exploder podcast, Martin Doherty and Iain Cook explained that the trio originally intended "Clearest Blue" to be a laid-back song with just two chords. Still, because they are notoriously bad at sticking to their own rules, they end up with something completely divergent from those ideas. After coming up with the base sample, they bounced ideas around, with Doherty adding "nonsense vocals" to establish the basic cadences of the song. Lauren Mayberry began writing the lyrics to replace these vocals but found herself frequently concerned that her pessimism would bleed through into the song's lyrics in parts intended to be hopeful. The song is typically described as building and building until it ultimately explodes at its melodic climax, but Doherty described it as more of an analytical climax, and that the vocal approach is not intended to be "super climactic, like punching the air" and that it is better described as a "moment of rest".

== Live performances ==
"Clearest Blue" debuted at Ottawa Bluesfest on 15 July 2015 as the opening song of Chvrches' first show since the conclusion of the 2013–2014 The Bones of What You Believe tour. Chvrches further promoted the song in several live appearances, including at the Pitchfork Music Festival and The Late Late Show with James Corden.

== Critical reception ==
"Clearest Blue" received acclaim from critics. NME called it "the album's most heart-bursting moment". A review from Stereogum said this "might be the strongest for a simple reason: it builds and builds and builds and doesn't break down until you've nearly lost faith that it will". Spin called the song "earnest and danceable" and praised its powerful opening notes, but "the song blossoms about halfway through with a breathtaking breakdown that bursts through the tension they've been building up".

== Music video ==
A music video for the song was released on 19 February 2016.

== Use in popular culture ==
"Clearest Blue" is used in the soundtrack of Forza Horizon 3, playing on the in-game radio station Horizon Pulse. It is also included in the soundtrack to season 1 of The Politician and in season 1, episode 3 of Netflix's Heartstopper.

== Track listing ==
All tracks are written by Chvrches.

Digital download
No.	Title	Length
1.	"Clearest Blue" (Album version)	3:53

== Charts ==
Chart (2015)	Peak position
Japan Hot 100 (Billboard)	74
UK Singles (Official Charts Company)	195
US Hot Rock & Alternative Songs (Billboard)	43

== Certifications ==
Certifications for "Clearest Blue"
Region	Certification	Certified units/sales
Australia (ARIA)	Gold	35,000^{‡}
^{‡} Sales+streaming figures based on certification alone.
