= Crocodile Tears =

Crocodile tears are false or insincere displays of emotion.

Crocodile Tears may also refer to:

- Crocodile Tears (film), a 2024 film by Tumpal Tampubolon
- Crocodile Tears (novel), an Alex Rider novel by Anthony Horowitz
- Crocodile Tears, the fictional film within Along Came Polly, a 2004 romantic comedy film
- "Crocodile Tears" (Citizen Smith), a 1977 television episode
- "Crocodile Tears", a 2007 song from Tangled Up (Girls Aloud album)
- "Crocodile Tears", a 1990 country song from Lee Roy Parnell (album)
- "Crocodile Tears", a 2024 song by Lauren Mayberry from Vicious Creature

== See also ==
- "Crocodile Tearz", a 2024 song from Might Delete Later
- Larme de Crocodile, a 1997 Shibuya-kei album by Kahimi Karie
- Luha ng Buwaya ("Crocodile's Tear"), a Tagalog-language novel by Amado V. Hernandez
- Alligator Tears (disambiguation)
