= The Mother We Share =

Single by Chvrches

from the album The Bones of What You Believe
- Released: 2 October 2012
- Genre: Indie pop, synth-pop
- Length: 3:09
- Label: National Anthem; Virgin; Glassnote
- Songwriters: Iain Cook; Martin Doherty; Lauren Mayberry
- Producer: Chvrches

Chvrches singles chronology
"The Mother We Share" (2012)	"Recover" (2013)

Alternative cover
- Cover art for Blood Diamonds remix

Music video
- "The Mother We Share" on YouTube

"The Mother We Share" is the debut single by Scottish indietronica band Chvrches from their debut studio album, The Bones of What You Believe. The song was re-released in the United Kingdom on 15 September 2013 by Virgin Records. The re-release peaked within the top 40 of the UK Singles Chart, reaching number 38 in September 2013. This made it their highest-charting single until 2019 when their collaboration with Marshmello's "Here With Me" reached number 9 on the UK Singles Chart in April 2019.

== Critical reception ==
Michael Cragg of The Guardian gave the song a positive review, while noting the mood differences between the song and a previous Chvrches track, "Lies". He wrote that the song "tempers the monster synth riffs in favour of twinkling keyboards, padded drum claps and a central lyric that lends the whole thing a slightly melancholic edge."

Duncan Cooper of The Fader praised Lauren Mayberry's vocals, comparing them to those of Megan James of Purity Ring. Ian Cohen of Pitchfork also similarly wrote that "Lauren Mayberry's neon sing-song vocals makes Chvrches stand out in a crowded field", while stating that the song's "melodic concision and extroversion goes beyond even that of recent adaptors like Purity Ring." He also compared the song to the works by the electronic music duo the Knife.

Pitchfork ranked it number 191 on their list of the top 200 tracks of the 2010s so far in 2014. In 2013, the song won the Popjustice £20 Music Prize for best British pop song.

== Music video ==
The music video for the song, directed by SJ Lee and featuring Alexandra Chelaru, was released on 5 August 2013. It alters between "a narrative of a lonely girl traversing her way through New York City" and flashy shots of Chvrches performing the track.

== Remixes ==
=== Blood Diamonds remix ===
The song was remixed by electronic music producer Blood Diamonds. The remix appeared on Chvrches' SoundCloud page.

The remix received positive reviews from the critics. Jamie Milton of This Is Fake DIY wrote: "The original is spun into a giant, hyperactive beast of looped vocals and Lauren Mayberry being made to sound like she's shouting from several sides at once." Larry Fitzmaurice of Pitchfork stated that the remix "takes the original's pulsing chorus and throws some crazy drum'n'bass noise behind it." Michelle Geslani of Consequence of Sound felt that Blood Diamond "literally injected it with 10x more energy," while noting "the chorus, which bursts with the hyperactive, glitchy thrills." She also called the song a "somewhat of a perfect personification of the countdown to the full-length."

=== A JD Twitch Optimo remix ===
The song was also remixed by Scottish DJ, JD Twitch of the music duo Optimo. It was eventually included in the single.

== In popular culture ==
"The Mother We Share" was used in a 2014 Marc Jacobs commercial.

The song was covered by artists such as Half Moon Run, Soak and Eefje de Visser.

The song was also used in the soundtrack of the 2014 racing video game Forza Horizon 2, in the radio station Horizon Pulse.

== Track listing ==
All tracks are written by Chvrches.

No.	Title	Length
1.	"The Mother We Share"	3:09
2.	"The Mother We Share" (A JD Twitch Optimo Remix)	5:00
3.	"The Mother We Share" (Miaoux Miaoux Remix)	4:37
Total length:		12:46

== Personnel ==
- Lauren Mayberry – lead vocals, additional synthesizers
- Iain Cook – synthesizers, guitar, bass, vocals
- Martin Doherty – synthesizers, samplers, vocals

== Charts ==
=== Weekly charts ===
Weekly chart performance for "The Mother We Share"
Chart (2013–2014)	Peak position
Belgium (Ultratip Bubbling Under Flanders)	9
Belgium (Ultratip Bubbling Under Wallonia)	13
Canada CHR/Top 40 (Billboard)	41
Canada Hot AC (Billboard)	42
Canada Rock (Billboard)	49
Germany (GfK)	63
Japan Hot 100 (Billboard)	6
Scottish Singles Sales (Official Charts)	35
UK Singles (Official Charts)	38
US Hot Singles Sales (Billboard)	15
US Hot Rock & Alternative Songs (Billboard)	30
US Adult Pop Airplay (Billboard)	33
US Alternative Airplay (Billboard)	12
US Rock & Alternative Airplay (Billboard)	20

=== Year-end charts ===
Year-end chart performance for "The Mother We Share"
Chart (2014)	Position
US Hot Rock Songs (Billboard)	81

== Certifications ==
Certifications for "The Mother We Share"
Region	Certification	Certified units/sales
Australia (ARIA)	Gold	35,000^{‡}
Canada (Music Canada)	Gold	40,000^{‡}
United Kingdom (BPI)	Gold	400,000^{‡}
United States (RIAA)	Gold	500,000^{‡}
^{‡} Sales+streaming figures based on certification alone.

== Release history ==
Release dates and formats for "The Mother We Share"
Region	Date	Format	Label	Ref.
United Kingdom	2 October 2012	Digital download	National Anthem	
United Kingdom	5 November 2012	10" vinyl	National Anthem	
United Kingdom	15 September 2013	Digital download (reissue)	Virgin	
United States	19 November 2013	Digital download	Glassnote	
United States	3 March 2014	Hot adult contemporary radio	Glassnote	
United States	4 March 2014	Contemporary hit radio	Glassnote	
