= Screen Violence =

Studio album by Chvrches
- Released: 27 August 2021
- Studios: Glasgow, Scotland; Los Angeles, United States
- Genres: Pop; synth-pop
- Length: 42:53
- Labels: EMI; Glassnote
- Producer: Chvrches

Chvrches chronology
Hansa Session (2018)	Screen Violence (2021)	All the King's Men (2027)

Singles from Screen Violence
- 1. "He Said She Said" Released: 19 April 2021; 2. "How Not to Drown" Released: 2 June 2021; 3. "Good Girls" Released: 12 July 2021

Screen Violence is the fourth studio album by Scottish synth-pop band Chvrches. Conceived after their previous album Love Is Dead (2018), production began in early 2020 before the advent of the COVID-19 pandemic, and continued remotely once it began. Thematically based around horror, the album is tonally darker and more narrative-based than the band's previous work. Its songs draw on the band's personal experiences, such as disillusionment and the societal expectations of womanhood.

The album was preceded by three singles: "He Said She Said", "How Not To Drown", and "Good Girls", the second of which incorporates vocals from the Cure frontman Robert Smith. The album was released on 27 August 2021 through EMI Records in the UK and Glassnote Records in the US. It received largely positive reviews from critics, who commended its composition and lyrical themes. The single "How Not To Drown" was recognised at the NME Awards 2022.

== Background ==
For their previous album, Love Is Dead (2018), Chvrches worked with external producers such as Greg Kurstin and oriented their sound towards pop music. With the band's growing popularity, frontwoman Lauren Mayberry received increased scrutiny and attention, and death threats and abusive messages, which increased the pressure on her and the band. After collaborating with Marshmello on "Here with Me" in 2019, the band criticised him for working with Chris Brown and Tyga despite sexual abuse allegations made against them; Brown responded by stating he wished that the band was hit by a "speeding bus full of mental patients". Meanwhile, the band's songwriter and instrument player Martin Doherty was struggling with depression and became secluded while on tour for Love Is Dead. These events partially influenced the ultimate direction of Screen Violence.

== Recording ==
The title Screen Violence came from a discarded name for the band, and was initially floated as a new album concept in 2019, inspired by the theme of violence "on screen, by screens and through screens". Production began in February 2020 shortly before the onset of the COVID-19 pandemic, and the majority of songwriting was accomplished during this time. As the pandemic began, production was continued remotely through programs such as Zoom; Doherty noted that the album's name became "a bit more literal" with its onset, with the band feeling "like half of our lives were lived through screens."

To prepare for the album, Mayberry watched a variety of horror movies. Doherty stated that the lack of touring allowed more experimentation with sounds and techniques. The album was recorded between Glasgow and Los Angeles; unlike Love Is Dead, the band produced it themselves.

The single "How Not to Drown" evolved from a piano and drum demo recorded by Doherty and was written during a time when he was dealing with "crippling depression and anxiety". It features vocals by the Cure frontman Robert Smith, who was approached by the band's manager, despite Doherty considering it implausible Smith would get in touch. Once Smith approached the band, they sent the track and he sent back his vocal performance.

== Composition and themes ==
Like Chvrches' previous work, Screen Violence is a synth-pop album, though it is tonally darker than the band's past albums. Experimentation during the pandemic led Doherty to incorporate more guitar elements. Critics have described the album as having a horror theme, with the band being influenced by the video nasty genre of horror film. In an interview for the album, Mayberry noted that women were not often centred in these movies, stating that "a lot of the songs" in Screen Violence focus on interrogating the absence of certain perspectives in horror media.

The album's songs were described by NME as "addressing feelings of loneliness, disillusionment and fear, among other emotions"; the band listened to the Cure, Depeche Mode, Brian Eno, OMD and New Order to inspire its sound. Mayberry stated she intended to take a "different" lyrical direction from Chvrches' earlier work, abandoning the "parameters [she] would normally put in place" in favour of more narrative-based lyrics, and citing Nick Cave and Jenny Lewis as inspiration. According to her, it initially felt "freeing" for the album to have an abstract and "escapist" concept, but the lyrics ended up being "definitely still personal", with her describing them as being about "the things we experienced that feel like horror".

=== Songs ===
The opening track, "Asking for a Friend", features Mayberry considering her past actions. "He Said She Said" comments on expectations around womanhood and contradictory messages expected of them, with the "he said"s being sonically elevated and the "she said"s being muffled. "California" is a "breakup song to Hollywood", being described by the band as a "juxtaposition" between the sunny "idea" of California and themes of failure and abandonment. "Violent Delights" includes references to A Nightmare on Elm Street. The goth-influenced "How Not to Drown", a duet with the Cure frontman Robert Smith, features lyrics about being "disillusioned about music and the industry", reflecting a time when Mayberry was considering leaving the band.

"Final Girl" is a reference to the "final girl" horror trope, but also alludes to the real-life experiences of women. "Good Girls" is a "defiant" synth-pop song where Mayberry rebukes attributes expected of "good girls" by punctuating the musical flow with "but I don't!". "Lullabies" and "Nightmares" are a couplet, being written shortly after each other; the latter explores forgiving both oneself and others. The subdued final track, "Better if You Don't" incorporates rock sounds.

== Release and promotion ==
The lead single "He Said She Said" was released on 19 April 2021. The album was announced on June 2 alongside the second single, "How Not to Drown", in collaboration with Robert Smith. The third single, "Good Girls", was released on July 12. In early August, horror filmmaker and composer John Carpenter released a remix of "Good Girls", with Chvrches releasing a remix of his track "Turning the Bones" in exchange.

The music videos for all three singles, described as a "connected trilogy", were made in collaboration with visual artist Scott Kiernan, who the band found through a Moog advertisement. Kiernan also took a role as creative director, working with the band on the visual elements of the album. The videos incorporate various props, including a large revolving door, a television screen, a darkroom, and an autorefractor. Due to COVID-19 lockdowns, the video for "How Not to Drown" involved Smith and the band members being filmed separately and composited together using greenscreen.

The album was released on 27 August 2021 through EMI Records in the UK and Glassnote Records in the US. On October 29, the band released a "director's cut" edition, containing three additional songs. The album was promoted with a North American tour from November to December 2021. The next year, they collaborated with Old Blood Noise Endeavors on a guitar pedal named after the album.

== Reception ==
Professional ratings
Aggregate scores
Source	Rating
Metacritic	81/100
Review scores
Source	Rating
AllMusic	4.5/5 stars
The A.V. Club	B+
Exclaim!	8/10
The Line of Best Fit	7/10
Paste	6.1/10
Pitchfork	7.2/10
PopMatters	8/10
Slant Magazine	3.5/5 stars

The ratings aggregation website Metacritic described Screen Violence as having "universal acclaim", holding a score of 81/100 based on a weighted average of 24 critical reviews.

The composition was largely praised by reviewers. Katherine St. Asaph of Pitchfork praised the album for experimenting with a variety of influences and avoiding "10 variations on 'Clearest Blue'". Exclaim! reviewer Paul Blinov called the album's sound "lively and responsive to the mood", considering it more sonically ambitious than their previous work. Variety writer Zack Ruskin stated the band was at "top of their game", with "backbeats that expertly skitter and scurry" on "Violent Delights". Contrastingly, The Line of Best Fit writer Marie Oleinik perceived the album as sometimes bereft of "imagination and sonic diversity", stating that she failed to distinguish some tracks even after repeat listening. Grant Sharples of Paste considered the album a "retread" that failed to live up to the band's past work, and its later portion as being made up of "forgettable material". Whilst Olienik considered Robert Smith's vocals poorly incorporated in "How Not to Drown", Blinov considered it "excellent goth-pop", and AllMusic reviewer Heather Phares described it as "gloomy enough to honor the legacies of everyone involved".

The album's thematic content was also widely commended, being described as "more mature" than Chvrches' previous work by The A.V. Club writer Alex McLevy. Slant reviewer Eric Mason felt that the album "lives up to its title's promise of anguish and suspicion of the Hollywood machine", considering it a return to form after Love Is Dead. Phares described it as the band's most purposeful record to date, and PopMatters praised the themes present in the lyrics, describing "Good Girls" as a "righteous rebuke of hypocrisy".

The album lead Consequence to name Chvrches their 2021 Band of the Year. Robert Smith and Chvrches won the Best Song By A UK Artist award for "How Not to Drown" at the NME Awards 2022. Stereogum placed Screen Violence at forty-sixth on their list of the best albums of 2021.

== Commercial performance ==
Screen Violence debuted at number four on the UK Official Albums Chart, after initially taking a lead in sales during the mid-week update chart. In the United States, it debuted at number 31 on the Billboard 200. In Australia, it debuted at number four on the ARIA Charts.

== Track listing ==
All tracks are written by Iain Cook, Martin Doherty, and Lauren Mayberry; "How Not to Drown" co-written with Robert Smith.

Screen Violence track listing
No.	Title	Length
1.	"Asking for a Friend"	5:05
2.	"He Said She Said"	3:09
3.	"California"	4:08
4.	"Violent Delights"	5:20
5.	"How Not to Drown" (with Robert Smith)	5:31
6.	"Final Girl"	4:30
7.	"Good Girls"	3:19
8.	"Lullabies"	3:45
9.	"Nightmares"	4:34
10.	"Better If You Don't"	3:32
Total length:		42:53

Japanese edition (bonus track)
No.	Title	Length
11.	"How Not to Drown" (Robert Smith Remix)	7:07

Screen Violence (Director's Cut) bonus tracks
No.	Title	Length
11.	"Killer"	3:20
12.	"Screaming"	3:34
13.	"Bitter End"	4:38

== Personnel ==
Credits adapted from Tidal and the liner notes.

Chvrches

- Lauren Mayberry – vocals, keyboards, percussion, production
- Iain Cook – keyboards, programming, guitar, bass, production, mixing
- Martin Doherty – keyboards, programming, guitar, bass, additional vocals on "Violent Delights", production, mixing

Additional personnel

- Robert Smith – vocals, bass (playing a Fender Bass VI) and backwards guitar on "How Not To Drown"
- Gavin Lurssen – mastering
- Samuel Stewart – vocal engineering
- Scott Kiernan – creative direction
- Lary 7 – original cover photography

== Charts ==
Chart performance for Screen Violence
Chart (2021)	Peak position
Australian Albums (ARIA)	6
Austrian Albums (Ö3 Austria)	19
Belgian Albums (Ultratop Flanders)	19
Belgian Albums (Ultratop Wallonia)	49
Canadian Albums (Billboard)	74
Czech Albums (ČNS IFPI)	71
Dutch Albums (Album Top 100)	91
German Albums (Offizielle Top 100)	15
Irish Albums (Official Charts)	4
Japan Hot Albums (Billboard Japan)	46
Scottish Albums (Official Charts)	1
Spanish Albums (Promusicae)	52
Swiss Albums (Schweizer Hitparade)	19
UK Albums (Official Charts)	4
US Billboard 200	31
