= Empty Threat =

Single by Chvrches

from the album Every Open Eye
- Released: 19 October 2015
- Recorded: 2015
- Genre: Synth-pop
- Length: 4:06
- Label: Virgin; Goodbye
- Songwriter: Chvrches
- Producer: Chvrches

Chvrches singles chronology
"Clearest Blue" (2015)	"Empty Threat" (2015)	"Warning Call" (2016)

Music video
- "Empty Threat" on YouTube

"Empty Threat" is a song by Scottish synth-pop band Chvrches from their second studio album Every Open Eye. It was released as the fourth single on 19 October 2015 via Virgin and Goodbye Records.

== Background ==
Iain Cook has said of the song:

Whenever we work on a new song, it's of paramount importance that we find the right balance between the various elements in the track and instrumentation. Whether it's the tension between brighter melodies and darker lyrics, or sparking synths and gritty production, it's a signature of what we do. We worked hard to get the right combination of those things for Empty Threat, and in the end we managed to find the sweet spot that captures the essence of Chvrches.

== Critical reception ==
The song received generally positive reviews. Georgia Parke of The Chronicle called it "a treat ... thankfully fast and crystal clear with Mayberry's best vocals on the album." Andrew Trendell of Gigwise said it "is an overwhelming surge of happy toxins - brought on by the kind of soundtrack to those moments in 80s movies where the losers figure it out and come out on top. So shamelessly satisfying, this is the audio equivalent of [a] high five."

== Music video ==
The music video for "Empty Threat" was filmed at Rapids Water Park in Riviera Beach, Florida, with Austin Peters directing. Peters shot on 16 mm film, citing an emotional quality of film that he feels digital media lacks. According to Peters, the band weren't included in the music video in part because they weren't particularly interested in being in it, but also because the premise of the video didn't really justify including the band; had the band been a group of high school goths, he said, their presence would have contributed greatly to the video and its atmosphere. Regardless, Peters felt the band were extremely supportive of the idea and were a pleasure to work with.

The video was released through Chvrches' YouTube channel on 20 November 2015.

== Charts ==
Chart (2015)	Peak position
Belgium (Ultratip Bubbling Under Flanders)	79
US Hot Singles Sales (Billboard)	12
