= Aereogramme =

Scottish alternative rock band

- Origin: Glasgow, Scotland
- Genres: Alternative rock, post-rock
- Years active: 1998–2007
- Labels: Chemikal Underground, Matador, Sonic Unyon
- Past members: Craig B. Iain Cook; Campbell McNeil; Martin Scott

Aereogramme were a Scottish alternative rock band from Glasgow, formed in 1998, consisting of Craig B. (vocals, guitar), Iain Cook (guitar, programming), Campbell McNeil (bass) and Martin Scott (drums). Prior to their split in 2007, the band released four studio albums.

== Biography ==
Formed in April 1998, the band released two 7" singles in 1999 before signing to Chemikal Underground in early 2000, at which point they recorded two EPs before releasing their first full-length, A Story in White, in 2001. Sleep and Release followed in 2003 but the band moved to Undergroove Records soon after for their third official release, Seclusion. However, the group re-signed to Chemikal Underground in August 2006.

Their fourth album, My Heart Has a Wish That You Would Not Go, was released in Europe and the United States on 29 January 2007 and in Japan on 14 October 2006, taking its title from the novel The Exorcist. Vocalist Craig B. revealed the long delay between releases was partly due to losing his singing voice for six months: "We didn't know if it was going to continue so everybody went their separate ways waiting for my voice to come back. I went to see a throat doctor and he told me to eat yogurt which I did and it did absolutely nothing. The only thing that made any difference was time 'cause I'd spent the previous couple of years screaming every single night and whisky and smoking and that was just a horrible combination. I think my body just said stop".

In May 2007, Aereogramme announced online that they were to disband:

It is with heavy hearts that we tell you all that Aereogramme have decided to split up. Reasons are multiple and complex. It is however fair to say that the never ending financial struggle coupled with an almost superhuman ability to dodge the zeitgeist have taken their toll, ensuring that we just don't have any fight left in us.

We are immensely proud of the four albums that we made over the past seven years. We hope that they continue to grow in your hearts.

We plan to honour and celebrate the beautiful friendships we have made along the way with these final shows over the summer.

The band played their last show at the Connect Music Festival in Inverary, Scotland on 31 August 2007.

=== Post-Aereogramme ===
Iain Cook and Craig B. formed another band, The Unwinding Hours, and released an album on 15 February 2010. Craig B. has since released two solo albums under the name A Mote of Dust and an ambient album under the name Slovenly Hooks. In 2011 Cook formed Chvrches with Martin Doherty (who worked on Aereogramme's last album) and Lauren Mayberry. He previously recorded, mixed and mastered fellow Scottish indie rock band The Twilight Sad's 2008 mini-album Here, It Never Snowed. Afterwards It Did. Bassist Campbell McNeil played on that album's opening track, "And She Would Darken the Memory". Martin Scott is currently working with Scottish rock band Biffy Clyro as tour manager and Campbell McNeil is working in the same capacity with The Temper Trap and Chvrches.

== Members ==
- Craig B. – vocals, guitar
- Iain Cook – guitar, programming
- Campbell McNeil – bass guitar
- Martin Scott – drums

== Discography ==
=== Albums ===
- A Story in White (2001)
- Sleep and Release (2003)
- Seclusion (2004)
- My Heart Has a Wish That You Would Not Go (2007)

=== Singles and EPs ===
- Hatred (1999)
- Translations (1999)
- Fukd ID No. 1 – Glam Cripple (2000)
- White Paw (2001)
- Acoustic Tour CDR (2003)
- Acoustic Tour CDR 2 (2003)
- Livers & Lungs (2003)
- Acoustic Tour CDR 3 (2004)
- Acoustic Tour CDR 4 (2005)
- In the Fishtank 14 with Isis (2006)
- Acoustic Tour CDR 5 (2006)

== See also ==
- List of bands from Glasgow
- List of Scottish musicians
