= My Heart Has a Wish That You Would Not Go =

Studio album by Aereogramme
- Released: 5 February 2007
- Recorded: 4th Street Studios, Glasgow, Scotland
- Genre: Alternative rock
- Length: 47:10
- Language: English
- Label: Chemikal Underground
- Producers: Aereogramme and Martin Doherty

Aereogramme chronology
| Seclusion (2004) | My Heart Has a Wish That You Would Not Go (2007) |

Singles from My Heart Has a Wish That You Would Not Go
- 1. "Barriers" Released: 29 January 2007; 2. "Conscious Life for Coma Boy" Released: 9 April 2007 (promo only)

Professional ratings
Review scores
| Source | Rating |
|---|---|
| AbsolutePunk.net | 91% |
| AllMusic | 3.5/5 stars |
| Drowned in Sound | 9/10 |
| The Guardian | 4/5 stars |
| NME | 8/10 |
| Pitchfork | 5.9/10 |
| Q | 3/5 stars |
| The Skinny | 4/5 stars |
| Sputnikmusic | 4.5/5 stars |

My Heart Has a Wish That You Would Not Go is the fourth and final studio album by Scottish band Aereogramme. The band drew the album name from the 1971 William Peter Blatty novel, The Exorcist. It was released on 5 February 2007 in the UK and Europe by Chemikal Underground, and on 6 February 2007 in North America by Sonic Unyon. The album was preceded by the single "Barriers" on 29 January 2007, which was released on 7" vinyl with the exclusive B-side "Dissolve".

Vocalist Craig B. revealed that the delay between My Heart Has a Wish and the band's previous release, 2004's Seclusion, was partly due to losing his singing voice for six months. Referring to the album's vocals, Craig B. stated in a 2010 interview with The Skinny that, "By the time we got to My Heart Has a Wish, I just didn't feel like screaming anymore. I think I wasn't as angry by then and it would have felt slightly dishonest to continue trying to have screaming songs just for the sake of it. I mean, when I unfortunately stumble upon a Linkin Park song on the radio I can't help but think that guy sounds like a dick. What's he angry about now? Slayer at least still sound genuinely pissed off."

In May 2007 the band announced that they were going to split after completion of the supporting tour. Aereogramme played their last show on 31 August 2007.

== Track listing ==
All tracks are written by Aereogramme.

| No. | Title | Length |
|---|---|---|
| 1. | "Conscious Life for Coma Boy" | 4:31 |
| 2. | "Barriers" | 4:56 |
| 3. | "Exits" | 4:16 |
| 4. | "A Life Worth Living" | 5:59 |
| 5. | "Finding a Light" | 3:46 |
| 6. | "Living Backwards" | 6:54 |
| 7. | "Trenches" | 4:09 |
| 8. | "Nightmares" | 4:06 |
| 9. | "The Running Man" | 3:33 |
| 10. | "You're Always Welcome" | 5:08 |

Japan-only bonus track
| No. | Title | Length |
|---|---|---|
| 11. | "Dissolve" | 5:22 |

== Personnel ==
Aereogramme

- Craig B. – vocals, guitar
- Iain Cook – guitar, programming
- Campbell McNeil – bass
- Martin Scott – drums, percussion

Production

- Produced by Aereogramme and Martin Doherty
- Additional piano, keyboards, and vocals by Martin Doherty
- Violin solo on "Barriers" by Graham McGeoch
- Recorded at 4th Street Studios, Glasgow
- Mixed by Iain Cook at Johnny Alucard Studios, Glasgow
- Mastered by Zlaya Hadzic at Loud Mastering, Amsterdam
- Design by Samuel Baker
