= Make Them Gold =

Song by CHVRCHES

from the album Every Open Eye
- Released: 24 September 2015
- Recorded: 2015
- Genre: Synth-pop
- Length: 3:51
- Label: Virgin; Goodbye
- Songwriter: Chvrches
- Producer: Chvrches

"Make Them Gold" is a song by Scottish synthpop band Chvrches from their second studio album, Every Open Eye. The song was made available in digital download in May 2016 via Virgin and Goodbye Records.

== Background ==
Lauren Mayberry told NME that the keyboard part in the song reminded her of "the bit in The Goonies where they're cycling down the hill."

== Critical reception ==
The song received generally favourable reviews. James Rainis from Slant Magazine said the song's "uplifting, bombastic drum accents and chattering pads [lend] credence to a hook that would come off as tawdry if it weren't delivered with such power." Laura Snapes, in a review on NPR's First Listen segment, felt the song showcased Mayberry's undaunted ambition and her ability to share that ambition with others, and the importance of self-awareness in establishing solid partnerships. Sasha Geffen from Consequence of Sound was more critical of the song, writing that, although the song is bombastic and powerful and Mayberry's voice is characteristically polished and charismatic, the words and melody seem shallow and border on redundancy.

== Live performances ==
"Make Them Gold" was promoted by Chvrches in a number of live appearances, including at the Pitchfork festival and the RBC Blues Festival.

== Track listing ==
All tracks are written by Chvrches.

Digital download
No.	Title	Length
1.	"Make Them Gold" (Album version)	3:51
