= Rapids Water Park =

Water park in Riviera Beach, Florida

Coordinates: 26.771°N 80.107°W

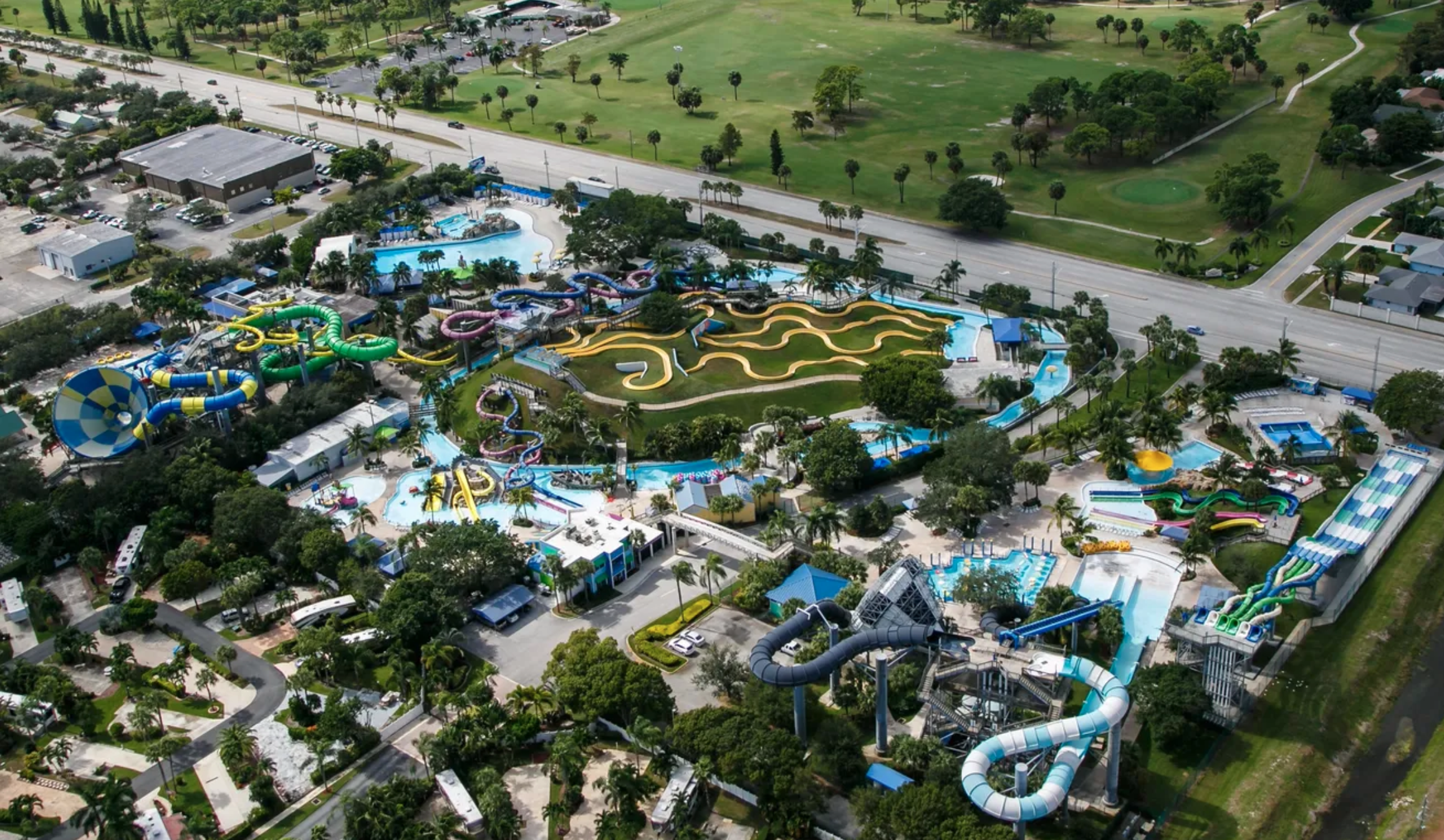
- Interactive map of Rapids Water Park
- Location: 6566 North Military Trail, Riviera Beach, Florida, U.S.
- Opened: 1979
- Owner: EPR Properties
- Operated by: Premier Parks, LLC
- General manager: Greg Fuller
- Operating season: March to November
- Attendance: 400,000
- Area: 30 acres (120,000 m^{2})

Attractions
- Water rides: 42
- Website: www.rapidswaterpark.com

Rapids Water Park is a water park in Riviera Beach, Florida, United States.

The park includes 42 slides and attractions, including a wave pool (up to six-foot waves), dual seven-story speed slides, and a quarter-mile lazy river. Slides are available for children and toddlers.

== History ==
The park was founded in 1979, on 4 acres (16,000 m^{2}) with four water slides. It grew to 30 acres (120,000 m^{2}), housing 35 slides, among other water-related attractions. In 2009, the park bought 2.2 acres (8,900 m^{2}) just north of the park for $2.2 million.

Rapids Water Park celebrated its 30th anniversary in 2009, inviting the racecar driver Danica Patrick to the park for the festivities.

== Attractions ==
=== Biggest ===
The most intense rides includes:

- Big Thunder - A dark ProSlide Tornado with a funnel at the end. The funnel is open, 60 feet (18 m) in diameter and 55 feet (17 m) in length.
- Black Thunder - Another ProSlide Tornado slide, taking place completely in the dark. The ride has been recently limited to two riders per tube due to safety concerns.
- Raging Rapids - Four-rider raft slide.
- Riptide Raftin' - Five-rider raft slide.
- Brain Drain - Dual trapdoor water slide with a seven-story tall drop, 8 seconds long.

=== Coolest ===
Rides and attractions designed for all ages include:

- Baby Blue - Fast single rider with funnel
- Big Red - Single or double-rider raft with funnel
- Body Blasters - Two dark slides, 1,000 feet (300 m) long.
- Mega Mayhem- Water coaster featuring two side-by-side flumes, propelled by jet propulsion technology
- Pirate's Plunge - Two speed slides
- Tubin' Tornadoes - Two single- or double-rider raft dark slides.

=== Wettest ===
Child- and family-friendly rides and areas include:

- Alligator Alley - A smaller-scale version of Criss Crossing.
- Big Surf - A wave pool covering 25,000 square feet (2,300 m^{2}).
- Criss Crossing - A pool guest can attempt to jump across using slippery, floating objects and an over-head net.
- FlowRider - continuous 35 mph simulated wave pool.
- Lazy River - A lazy river ride that can be used for transportation around the park.
- Splash Hill - Eight slides, including two racing slides and two dark slides
- Splish Splash Lagoon - Three family slides and play pools.
- BareFootin' Bay - A water play structure with interactive features like sprayers, 3 slides and a giant pineapple tipping bucket.

== In popular culture ==
The park appears in the 1997 film Donnie Brasco water park scene.

In 2000, Miami born rapper Trina shot the music video for her song "Pull Over" at the park.

In 2009, the MTV reality show Jersey Shore requested to film at the park, but was denied.

The music video for "Empty Threat" by Chvrches was shot at the park.

== See also ==
- Santa's Enchanted Forest
- Miami-Dade County Fair & Exposition
- South Florida Fair
