= Alligator Tears =

Alligator Tears may refer to:

- "Alligator Tears" (Bunnicula), a 2016 TV episode
- Alligator Tears, a 1999 album by James E. Billie
- Alligator Tears, a 2016 album by The Downtown Fiction

== See also ==
- "Alliigator Tears", a 2024 song by Beyoncé
- Crocodile Tears (disambiguation)
