= Bury It =

Single by Chvrches featuring Hayley Williams

from the album Every Open Eye
- Released: 10 June 2016
- Recorded: 2015–2016
- Genre: Synth-pop
- Length: 3:08
- Label: Virgin EMI; Goodbye
- Songwriter: Chvrches
- Producer: Chvrches

Chvrches singles chronology
| "Warning Call" (2016) | "Bury It" (2016) | "Get Out" (2018) |

Hayley Williams singles chronology
| "Vicious Love" (2015) | "Bury It" (2016) | "Uncomfortably Numb" (2019) |

Music video
- "Bury It" on YouTube

"Bury It" is a song by Scottish synth-pop band Chvrches from their second studio album, Every Open Eye (2015). A remix of the song featuring Paramore frontwoman Hayley Williams was released on 10 June 2016 as the album's fifth and final single. The remix is included on the extended edition of Every Open Eye. The studio version of the remix premiered on Annie Mac's BBC Radio 1 show on 9 June 2016.

== Live performances ==
Chvrches and Williams first performed "Bury It" together at Marathon Music Works in Nashville, Tennessee, on 27 October 2015. On 8 March 2016, the two artists also performed the song together during the Parahoy! cruise, which sailed from Miami to Cozumel, Mexico.

== Music video ==
A lyric video for the song was released on 9 June 2016. A fully animated music video, created by Jamie McKelvie and illustrated by Mighty Nice, premiered on 11 July 2016.

== Charts ==
Chart performance for "Bury It"
| Chart (2016) | Peak position |
|---|---|
| Japan Radio Songs (Billboard) Solo version | 46 |
| Mexico Airplay (Billboard) | 44 |
| Mexico Ingles Airplay (Billboard) | 2 |
| Scottish Singles Sales (Official Charts) | 93 |
| US Alternative Airplay (Billboard) | 31 |
| US Hot Rock & Alternative Songs (Billboard) | 32 |

== Release history ==
Release dates and formats for "Bury It"
| Region | Date | Format | Label | Ref. |
|---|---|---|---|---|
| France | 10 June 2016 | Digital download | Mercury | |
| Germany | 10 June 2016 | Digital download | Vertigo Berlin | |
| United Kingdom | 10 June 2016 | Digital download (Note: Via pre-order of the extended edition of Every Open Eye) | Virgin EMI; Goodbye | |
| United States | 10 June 2016 | Digital download | Glassnote | |
