= Light It Up (Marshmello, Tyga and Chris Brown song) =

Single by Marshmello featuring Tyga and Chris Brown
- Released: April 25, 2019
- Recorded: October 2018
- Genre: Hip hop
- Length: 2:17
- Label: Astralwerks; Joytime Collective
- Songwriter(s): Micheal Stevenson; Chris Brown; Christopher Comstock; Paul Judge
- Producer(s): Marshmello

Marshmello singles chronology
"Here with Me" (2019)	"Light It Up" (2019)	"Rescue Me" (2019)

Tyga singles chronology
"Goddamn" (2019)	"Light It Up" (2019)	"Go Loko" (2019)

Chris Brown singles chronology
"Wobble Up" (2019)	"Light It Up" (2019)	"Easy (Remix)" (2019)

Music video
- "Light It Up" on YouTube

"Light It Up" is a song by American record producer Marshmello, American rapper Tyga and American singer Chris Brown, released on April 25, 2019. Its music video, directed by Arrad, was released on the same date.

== Promotion ==
Before posting the YouTube countdown and teaser, on April 22, Marshmello posted a link to the website mellomadeitright.com on his social media, which contains the message "You're invited to light it up" and a link to connect Spotify with the site to "RSVP". Upon RSVPing, the site displayed a message that reads, in part, "See you 4.25".

== Controversy ==
Scottish group Chvrches, who collaborated with Marshmello on his previous single "Here with Me", posted an unexpected statement to social media on April 25, saying that while they "like and respect [Marshmello] as a person", they were "really upset, confused and disappointed" by his decision to work with Tyga and Chris Brown, as "working with people who are predators and abusers enables, excuses and ultimately tacitly endorses that behaviour".

Brown responded by calling Chvrches a "bunch of losers" in the comments section of an Instagram post by the band. He also characterized them as the sort of people he "wish walked in front of a speeding bus full of mental patients", before later referring to them as "simple minded peasants". Tyga also responded, posting to Instagram: "Where [sic] all God's children. Everyone makes mistakes no ones perfect. Let's keep the energy positive."

== Credits and personnel ==
Credits adapted from Tidal.

- Marshmello – production, lyrics, programming
- Paul Judge – lyrics
- Chris Brown – vocals, lyrics
- Tyga – vocals, lyrics
- Mike Seaberg – additional mixing, studio personnel
- Rashawn McLean – mixing assistance, studio personnel
- Jacob Richards – mixing assistance, studio personnel
- Colin Leonard – mastering
- Jaycen Joshua – mixing, studio personnel
- Patrizio Pigliapoco – vocal engineering, studio personnel
- Christian "CQ" Quinonez – recording engineer, studio personnel

== Charts ==
Chart (2019)	Peak position
Australia (ARIA)	60
Belgium (Ultratip Bubbling Under Wallonia)	25
Canada (Canadian Hot 100)	75
Germany (GfK)	77
Greece (IFPI)	38
Hungary (Stream Top 40)	40
Ireland (IRMA)	63
Lithuania (AGATA)	43
New Zealand Hot Singles (RMNZ)	4
Slovakia (Singles Digitál Top 100)	92
Sweden Heatseeker (Sverigetopplistan)	2
Switzerland (Schweizer Hitparade)	78
UK Singles (OCC)	55
US Billboard Hot 100	90
US Hot R&B/Hip-Hop Songs (Billboard)	35
US R&B/Hip-Hop Airplay (Billboard)	31
US Rhythmic (Billboard)	11

== Certifications ==
Region	Certification	Certified units/sales
Canada (Music Canada)	Gold	40,000^{‡}
^{‡} Sales+streaming figures based on certification alone.
