= Fukd ID =

British record label

Fukd ID is an imprint on the Chemikal Underground record label, established to allow them to release a wider range of musical styles from artists who might not necessarily be signed to the label. Notable releases include the first EP from the band Interpol.

== List of releases ==
- Fukd ID #1 – Aereogramme
- Fukd ID #2 – Arab Strap
- Fukd ID #3 – Interpol
- Fukd ID #4 – British Meat Scene
- Fukd ID #5 – bis
- Fukd ID #6 – Ben Tramer
- Fukd ID #7 – Model Fighter
- Fukd ID #8 – Kempston, Protek & Fuller
