= Sleep and Release =

Studio album by Aereogramme
- Released: 18 February 2003
- Genres: Alternative rock, post-rock
- Length: 49:52
- Labels: Chemikal Underground, CHEM069, Matador, OLE-571
- Producer: Geoff Allen

Aereogramme chronology
A Story in White (2001)	Sleep and Release (2003)	Livers & Lungs (2004)

Professional ratings
Review scores
Source	Rating
AllMusic	4/5 stars
The A.V. Club	(B)
Delusions of Adequacy	(10/10)
Entertainment Weekly	(B)
Pitchfork	(8.5/10)

Sleep and Release is the second album by Scottish band Aereogramme. It was released in 2003 on Chemikal Underground in the UK and Matador in the USA.

In 2010, vocalist Craig B stated that he has:

"a particular fondness for Sleep and Release because it has the heaviest song we ever did, "Wood", and maybe the most personal, "A Winter's Discord". [...] We tried to make it as dynamic as we possibly could and it turned out to be quite an intense and layered album, especially with all the segues. It doesn't really let you rest and take anything in until it's all over. I'm incredibly proud of it but I'm not surprised we didn't bother the charts. It's not an easy listen.

== Track listing ==
All songs written by Aereogramme.

1. "Indiscretion #243" – 3:43
2. "Black Path" – 3:53
3. "A Simple Process of Elimination" – 5:48
4. "Older" – 5:17
5. "No Really, Everything's Fine" – 5:55
6. "Wood" – 5:21
7. "Yes" – 2:00
8. "In Gratitude" – 4:52
9. "A Winter's Discord" – 6:32
10. "-" – 6:31
