= Ricky C =

American singer

- Born: Ricardo Cisneros; July 22, 1980 (age 46); Chicago, Illinois
- Origin: U.S., Ecuador
- Genres: Urban, Latin, Pop
- Occupations: Singer-songwriter, musician, record producer
- Instruments: Vocals, guitar, piano
- Website: www.rickycmusica.com

Ricardo Cisneros (born July 22, 1980), known by his stage name Ricky C, is an American-born Latin pop recording artist. Ricky C is a singer, songwriter, dancer, music composer, music producer, and sound engineer. He records and writes in both English and Spanish.

== Early life ==
Son of Ecuadorian parents, Ricky C was born in Chicago and raised in Miami, Florida. Ricky's father, Segundo Cisneros, was a Latin singer who released multiple albums and performed worldwide. His father introduced Ricky to music at a young age. At 17, Ricky C decided to pursue music professionally and he began his career under the tutelage of his father.

== Music career ==
In 1998, Ricky C signed with Tower Records for a distribution deal for two albums. In 2002, Ricky C toured South America and the UK. In 2006, Ricky's father/manager dies from cancer. The following year, Ricky C began working with music producer Humberto "Humby" Viana for Miami-based label Sculvia Entertainment. Together they wrote and produced "Otro Amor" which caught the attention of Universal Music Latin Entertainment/Machete Music.

Notable performances include the Latin Billboard Awards Showcase with ASCAP, the National Anthem for the New Orleans Saints and the Los Angeles Lakers, God Bless America for the Atlanta Braves, the Calle Ocho Carnival Festival, and the WPOW Beach House concert. Ricky C has been featured in Billboard, ASCAP Playback Magazine, and was signed as a spokesperson for the Tobacco Free Florida campaign. Ricky C's Spanish-language debut single "Otro Amor" was released on August 24, 2010, on iTunes and Amazon.com. The music video of "Otro Amor" is played on vevo, YouTube, mun2, and Htv. The song peaked at number 12 on the Latin Billboard's Tropical Chart on June 11, 2011. In December 2009, Ricky was featured in the official remix to Nelly Furtado's second Spanish-album single "Más". Early 2011, Ricky C participated on two songs on Jon Secada's Spanish-pop album Otra Vez. "No Puedo Olvidarte" and "Dimension". Both songs were written and produced by Ricky Cisneros and Humberto "Humby" Viana. For the song "Dimension" that Ricky C is featured on, the pads were done by Miami-based producer Yrakly "Blayd" Lemus.
