= Recover EP =

EP by Chvrches
- Released: 25 March 2013
- Genre: Synth-pop
- Length: 21:25
- Labels: Goodbye; Virgin (UK); Glassnote (US)
- Producer: Chvrches

Chvrches chronology
Recover EP (2013)	The Bones of What You Believe (2013)

Recover EP is the debut EP by Scottish synth-pop band Chvrches.

It was released on 25 March 2013 in the UK via Goodbye and Virgin Records and 26 March 2013 in the US via Glassnote Records. The song "Recover" was issued as the second single from their debut studio album The Bones of What You Believe and it reached number 91 in the UK Singles Chart. This was the first time that a Chvrches single received notable attention on singles charts, as the band's first single, "The Mother We Share", would not begin to chart until its re-release in Autumn of 2013. The "Recover" single was also promoted by a music video.

Recover EP was released as digital download and as a limited edition 12" vinyl for Record Store Day 2013. It was also re-released as a limited edition orange 12" vinyl for Record Store Day 2014.

== Reception ==
Recover EP received positive reviews. At Metacritic, which assigns a normalized rating out of 100 to reviews from mainstream critics, the album received an average score of 75 based on 10 reviews, which indicates "generally favorable reviews.

Professional ratings
Review scores
Source	Rating
No Ripcord	8/10 stars
NME	8/10 stars
Consequence of Sound	(positive)
Pitchfork	7.6/10
Paste Magazine	(positive)

== Track listing ==
All tracks are written by Chvrches.

No.	Title	Length
1.	"Recover"	3:45
2.	"ZVVL"	3:11
3.	"Now Is Not the Time"	3:44
4.	"Recover (CID RIM Remix)"	5:47
5.	"Recover (Curxes' 1996 Remix)"	4:58
