= Here with Me (Marshmello song) =

2019 single by Marshmello ft. Chvrches

Single by Marshmello featuring Chvrches
- Released: March 8, 2019
- Genre: EDM-pop; dance-pop
- Length: 2:36
- Label: Republic; Geffen; Joytime Collective
- Songwriters: Steve Mac; Iain Cook; Martin Doherty; Lauren Mayberry; Marshmello
- Producers: Steve Mac; Marshmello

Marshmello singles chronology
"Sell Out" (2019)	"Here with Me" (2019)	"Light It Up" (2019)

Chvrches singles chronology
"Miracle" (2018)	"Here with Me" (2019)	"Death Stranding" (2019)

Music video
- "Here with Me" on YouTube

"Here with Me" is a song by American DJ Marshmello, featuring Scottish synthpop band Chvrches. It was released on March 8, 2019 alongside an animated lyric video. The official music video was released on April 5, 2019.

== Composition ==
"Here with Me" is composed in E♭ major. The song was called reminiscent of Marshmello's earlier electronic production work, with the opening being "markedly restrained" that "provides a rare chance for him to experiment with guitars." The instrumentation was also described as "acoustic guitars and EDM beats".

== Promotion ==
Along with announcing the song, Marshmello posted a 19-second snippet of the song, with Your EDM saying that the collaboration sounds more like Marshmello's previous singles with vocalists instead of his Joytime album series material. On April 3, 2019, Marshmello and Chvrches gave a live performance of "Here with Me" on Jimmy Kimmel Live!.

== Critical reception ==
Stereogum called it "standard-issue dance-pop fluff, with a bit more of an emotional pull to it thanks to Mayberry's performance. It's the sort of song that you might forget about immediately after hearing."

== Chart performance ==
"Here with Me" became Marshmello's fourth number one (and his seventh top ten) and Chvrches' first on Billboard's Dance/Mix Show Airplay chart. It is also the highest position peak for Chvrches on a Billboard airplay chart to date. It also reached the top twenty in Canada. It peaked at number nine on the UK Singles Chart. It charted at number 31 on the Billboard Hot 100 becoming Chvrches' first entry on the chart & their highest-charting single in the country.

== Credits and personnel ==
Credits adapted from Tidal.

- Marshmello – production, lyrics
- Steve Mac – additional production
- Lauren Mayberry – vocals, lyrics
- Iain Cook – guitar, lyrics
- Brandon Buttner – studio personnel, vocal engineering
- Martin Doherty – lyrics

== Charts ==
=== Weekly charts ===
Chart (2019)	Peak position
Australia (ARIA)	9
Austria (Ö3 Austria Top 40)	42
Belgium (Ultratop 50 Flanders)	20
Belgium (Ultratop 50 Wallonia)	28
Bolivia (Monitor Latino)	17
Canada Hot 100 (Billboard)	15
China Airplay/FL (Billboard)	23
CIS Airplay (TopHit)	97
Czech Republic Singles Digital (ČNS IFPI)	20
Denmark (Tracklisten)	18
France (SNEP)	113
Germany (GfK)	49
Germany Dance (Official German Charts)	5
Hungary (Rádiós Top 40)	37
Hungary (Stream Top 40)	13
Ireland (IRMA)	10
Italy (FIMI)	95
Japan Hot 100 (Billboard)	50
Latvia (LAIPA)	13
Lithuania (AGATA)	14
Mexico Airplay (Billboard)	49
Mexico Ingles Airplay (Billboard)	14
Netherlands (Dutch Top 40)	14
Netherlands (Single Top 100)	42
New Zealand (Recorded Music NZ)	24
Norway (VG-lista)	28
Portugal (AFP)	59
Scotland Singles (OCC)	11
Singapore (RIAS)	13
Slovakia Airplay (ČNS IFPI)	71
Slovakia Singles Digital (ČNS IFPI)	16
Slovenia (SloTop50)	36
Sweden (Sverigetopplistan)	39
Switzerland (Schweizer Hitparade)	62
UK Singles (OCC)	9
UK Dance (OCC)	1
US Billboard Hot 100	31
US Adult Pop Airplay (Billboard)	18
US Alternative Airplay (Billboard)	23
US Dance Club Songs (Billboard)	41
US Hot Dance/Electronic Songs (Billboard)	2
US Pop Airplay (Billboard)	12
US Rolling Stone Top 100	62

=== Year-end charts ===
Chart (2019)	Position
Australia (ARIA)	46
Belgium (Ultratop Flanders)	54
Canada (Canadian Hot 100)	52
Netherlands (Dutch Top 40)	78
UK Singles (OCC)	56
US Hot Dance/Electronic Songs (Billboard)	4
US Rolling Stone Top 100	90

=== Decade-end charts ===
Chart (2010–2019)	Position
US Hot Dance/Electronic Songs (Billboard)	38

== Certifications ==
Region	Certification	Certified units/sales
Australia (ARIA)	Platinum	70,000^{‡}
Belgium (BRMA)	Gold	20,000^{‡}
Brazil (Pro-Música Brasil)	2× Platinum	80,000^{‡}
Canada (Music Canada)	2× Platinum	160,000^{‡}
Denmark (IFPI Danmark)	Gold	45,000^{‡}
Germany (BVMI)	Gold	200,000^{‡}
Italy (FIMI)	Gold	25,000^{‡}
New Zealand (RMNZ)	2× Platinum	60,000^{‡}
Poland (ZPAV)	Gold	25,000^{‡}
United Kingdom (BPI)	Platinum	747,000
United States (RIAA)	2× Platinum	2,000,000^{‡}
Streaming
Japan (RIAJ)	Gold	50,000,000^{†}
^{‡} Sales+streaming figures based on certification alone.^{†} Streaming-only figures based on certification alone.
