= A Story in White =

Studio album by Aereogramme
- Released: 24 September 2001
- Genre: Alternative rock
- Labels: Chemikal Underground, CHEM053, Matador, OLE-533

Aereogramme chronology
A Story in White (2001)	Sleep and Release (2003)

Professional ratings
Review scores
Source	Rating
AllMusic	3/5 stars
Drowned in Sound	9/10
Kerrang!	link
Pitchfork	8.2/10

A Story in White is the debut album by the Scottish band Aereogramme, released in 2001 on the Chemikal Underground label.

== Track listing ==
1. "The Question Is Complete" – 4:50
2. "Post-Tour, Pre-Judgement" – 5:10
3. "Egypt" – 3:19
4. "Hatred" – 4:21
5. "Zionist Timing" – 5:30
6. "Sunday 3:52" – 4:56
7. "Shouting for Joey" – 3:27
8. "A Meaningful Existence" – 5:12
9. "Descending" – 4:30
10. "Will You Still Find Me?" – 4:12
