= Seclusion (Aereogramme album) =

Studio album by Aereogramme
- Released: 20 September 2004
- Genre: Alternative rock
- Length: 31:58
- Label: Undergroove
- Producer: Aereogramme

Aereogramme chronology
Livers & Lungs (2003)	Seclusion (2004)	My Heart Has a Wish That You Would Not Go (2007)

Professional ratings
Review scores
Source	Rating
Pitchfork	(6.8/10)

Seclusion is the third album by the Scottish rock band Aereogramme. The album artwork was created by Aaron Turner.

== Track listing ==
1. "Inkwell" – 3:55
2. "Dreams and Bridges" – 4:40
3. "The Unravelling" – 10:58
4. "I Don't Need Your Love" – 4:03
5. "Lightning Strikes the Postman" (The Flaming Lips cover) – 3:29
6. "Alternate Score" – 4:53
