= Every Open Eye =

Studio album by Chvrches
- Released: 25 September 2015
- Recorded: January–July 2015
- Studios: Alucard Studios (Glasgow, Scotland)
- Genre: Synth-pop
- Length: 42:02
- Labels: Virgin EMI; Goodbye
- Producer: Chvrches

Chvrches chronology
The Bones of What You Believe (2013)	Every Open Eye (2015)	Love Is Dead (2018)

Singles from Every Open Eye
- 1. "Leave a Trace" Released: 17 July 2015; 2. "Never Ending Circles" Released: 12 August 2015; 3. "Clearest Blue" Released: 10 September 2015; 4. "Empty Threat" Released: 19 October 2015; 5. "Bury It" Released: 10 June 2016 (remix)

Every Open Eye is the second studio album by Scottish synth-pop band Chvrches. It was released on 25 September 2015 by Virgin EMI Records and Goodbye Records. Self-produced by the band, it is the band's follow-up to their critically acclaimed debut album, The Bones of What You Believe (2013). The album title comes from a lyric in the song "Clearest Blue". The album received positive reviews from music critics and was listed on several year-end best-of lists.

== Recording and production ==
Chvrches began work on their second album in January 2015, six weeks after returning from touring to promote their previous album The Bones of What You Believe. Like The Bones of What You Believe, recording took place in Alucard Studios, located in a basement flat owned by Cook, refurbished with the advance for the new album. The group were able to make enough money from sales of their debut studio album, which entered the top 10 of the UK Albums Chart as well as peaking at number 12 on the US Billboard 200, to afford to record in a better studio for their next album. However, according to Iain Cook, the group had "kind of [...] took [Alucard] over" when recording of the first LP ended, despite the fact that they were still renting the place at the time, and decided to stay in the studio to produce Every Open Eye: "we wanted to go right back to where it all started. Partly, I guess, superstitiously. There's something in the room that we didn't want to lose, and we'd rather invest the money that we had available into upgrading the gear and patching it all in — just making it exactly the way we wanted it, rather than giving it to some other studio and another producer in LA or wherever." Doherty said that the low rent price of the place gave the members less worry about risking waste of production costs, therefore allowing more freedom for experimentation that he felt was needed in making electronic music. The Neumann KH120A monitors that were used in this room were also used for the recording of the Bones album, which they praised as "kind of easy to get along with, but at the same time quite representative of what's going on".

There were changes in production tools and equipment in the making of Every Open Eye. Chvrches now used Steinberg's Cubase as their digital audio workstation instead of the company's Nuendo, the latter having many features the group did not need to use. Instead of using drum machine sounds from sample libraries that were featured on Bones and timing them with MIDI, loops of rhythms executed from a Dave Smith Instruments Tempest analogue and Roland TR-8 were favoured for making drum parts. Doherty said, "we don't perfectly shape every single sound — snare drums cutting off in weird places, fills that have got deliberately cut-up samples. But more importantly, I want to see, 'Here's my verse, here's my chorus.' I find it a much more musical way to write drums if you can see what's going on and refer to the rest of the song at the same time. So we've maintained that philosophy throughout." In addition to the basement, Every Open Eye was also made in the second room of Alucard, where engineer David Simpson recorded Mayberry's vocals, which featured a prefabricated vocal booth the group bought from the internet for the room and were pleased with, while Doherty would be in the basement working on the instrumentals. Simpson had agreed to let the group use his room if they let him work on the record. Doherty described him as a "great guy, a supreme talent. He's the only person that we trusted to come in and take charge of some of the technical aspects of what we were doing." Another difference was the subwoofers the band used; to match the Neumann monitors, the group used Neumann subwoofers instead of Tannoy subwoofers.

The trio would write a rough instrumental, Mayberry would pen lyrics and they would then put together a demo track. The band wrote around thirty demos in all. Producing all the music themselves, they recorded 21 tracks in total. The recording process took about five months, with the band working six-hour days, five days a week. The band were approached about the prospect of co-writing songs for the album, but refused; Doherty explained: "As we were making this album, a bunch of people offered to write with us, but we wanted to be an actual band." Cook noted that they wanted the album "to sound and to feel spontaneous". "Clearest Blue", the seventeenth track recorded for the album, "came to define how the rest sounds", according to Doherty: "big and happy and sad and a banger". The group determined democratically which tracks would be included on the album, and were in disagreement over inclusion of "Afterglow". On the final day of recording they slowed it down, removed the drum track and re-recorded the vocal track. The vocals were recorded in a single take, with various background noises left in. Witnessing Mayberry's performance, Doherty was "quite emotional", and they made the decision that the track would close the album.

== Release ==
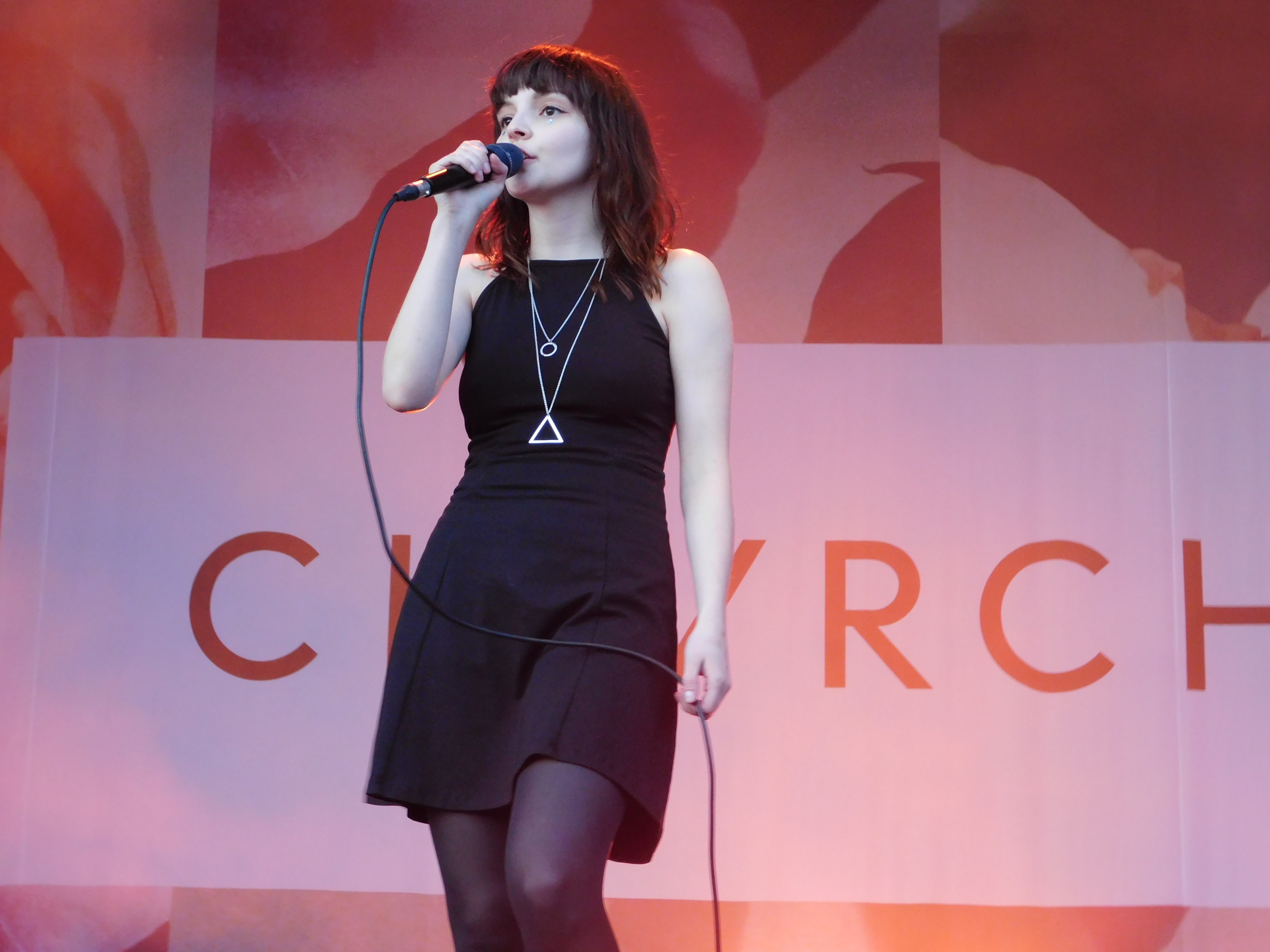
Chvrches performing at Ottawa Bluesfest 2015, where they debuted three songs from the album

On 15 July 2015 at Ottawa Bluesfest, the band debuted the songs "Clearest Blue", "Leave a Trace" and "Make Them Gold" before a live audience. On 17 July 2015, the band released the first single, "Leave a Trace", along with the formal announcement of the album's title, release date, cover art and track listing. Rolling Stone ranked "Leave a Trace" at number 24 on its annual year-end list to find the best songs of 2015.

On 12 August 2015, the band released the second single, "Never Ending Circles". On 10 September 2015, the band released the third single, "Clearest Blue". On 20 September 2015, the album debuted on NPR's First Listen. On 19 October 2015, the band released the fourth single, "Empty Threat". On 13 May 2016, the band released "Warning Call", the theme song from the video game Mirror's Edge Catalyst. It was included in the extended edition of the album, released on 29 July 2016. On 10 June 2016, the band released the fifth and final single "Bury It", a new version featuring Hayley Williams.

== Critical reception ==
Professional ratings
Aggregate scores
Source	Rating
AnyDecentMusic?	7.4/10
Metacritic	77/100
Review scores
Source	Rating
AllMusic	4/5 stars
The A.V. Club	A
Billboard	4/5 stars
The Guardian	4/5 stars
NME	4/5
Pitchfork	7.7/10
Q	3/5 stars
Rolling Stone	3.5/5 stars
Spin	7/10
Uncut	7/10

Every Open Eye received generally positive reviews from music critics. At Metacritic, which assigns a weighted mean rating out of 100 to reviews from mainstream critics, the album has an average score of 77 out of 100, which indicates "generally favorable reviews" based on 31 reviews.

Billboard's Carl Wilson's four out of five star review claims: "the sound is cleaner – there are fewer of the stop-start hitches and processed-vocal effects from Bones – the beats are more resounding, and the choruses often even more explosive." Emily Mackay of NME praised the album, calling it "a record like a deep gulp of cold air on a clear, bright morning after." Heather Phares of AllMusic rated the album four out of five stars, writing, "even if Every Open Eye is cheerier-sounding than The Bones of What You Believe, its emotions are just as complex."

NPR's Laura Snapes wrote that the album "fizzes with the jolting electricity that it takes to jump-start a lifeless situation, and wields more razzle-dazzle than Chvrches' debut dared to attempt." The music itself was characterized as "delicious camp and Cyndi Lauper brass pops up alongside quieter moments that only make the stakes seem higher."

Nate Scott of For The Win declared "Clearest Blue" the band's best song to date.

=== Accolades ===
Publication	Rank	List
AbsolutePunk	29	Top 30 Albums of 2015
AllMusic	—N/a	Best Pop Albums of 2015
American Songwriter	12	Top 50 Albums of 2015
Blare	40	The Top 50 Albums of 2015
CraveOnline	18	The 20 Best Albums of 2015
Diffuser	43	The 50 Best Albums of 2015
Entertainment Weekly	26	The 40 Best Albums of 2015
The Guardian	31	The Best Albums of 2015
FasterLouder	48	The 50 Best Albums of 2015
Mashable	15	The 30 Best Albums of 2015
NME	6	NME's Albums Of The Year 2015
Paste	16	The 50 Best Albums of 2015
Pigeons & Planes	33	The 50 Best Albums of 2015
Popjustice	10	The Top 33 Albums of 2015
PopMatters	42	The 80 Best Albums of 2015
Pretty Much Amazing	37	Best 50 Albums of 2015
Q	28	The 50 Best Albums of 2015
The Skinny	21	The 50 Best Albums of 2015
Spin	43	The 50 Best Albums of 2015
Spin	7	The 25 Best Pop Albums of 2015
Stereogum	33	The 50 Best Albums of 2015
Treble	25	The 50 Best Albums of 2015
Under the Radar	9	Top 100 Albums of 2015
Variance	20	The 50 Best Albums of 2015

== Commercial performance ==
Every Open Eye debuted at number four on the UK Albums Chart, selling 15,844 copies in its first week. In the United States, the album debuted at number eight on the Billboard 200 with 38,000 equivalent album units in its first week of release. Additionally, it debuted at number one on both the Top Rock Albums and the Alternative Albums charts.

== Track listing ==
All tracks are written and produced by Chvrches.

Every Open Eye standard edition track listing
No.	Title	Length
1.	"Never Ending Circles"	3:06
2.	"Leave a Trace"	3:57
3.	"Keep You on My Side"	4:25
4.	"Make Them Gold"	3:51
5.	"Clearest Blue"	3:53
6.	"High Enough to Carry You Over"	3:39
7.	"Empty Threat"	4:04
8.	"Down Side of Me"	5:10
9.	"Playing Dead"	3:35
10.	"Bury It"	3:08
11.	"Afterglow"	3:14
Total length:		42:02

German edition bonus track
No.	Title	Length
12.	"Up in Arms"	5:08
Total length:		47:10

German limited deluxe edition bonus tracks
No.	Title	Length
13.	"Get Away"	4:40
14.	"Follow You"	3:54
15.	"Bow Down"	4:38
Total length:		60:22

Target exclusive edition bonus tracks
No.	Title	Length
16.	"Leave a Trace" (Live at Pitchfork Music Festival)	3:57
17.	"Clearest Blue" (Live at Pitchfork Music Festival)	5:20
Total length:		69:39

Special/deluxe edition bonus tracks
No.	Title	Length
12.	"Get Away"	4:40
13.	"Follow You"	3:54
14.	"Bow Down"	4:38
Total length:		55:14

Japanese edition bonus tracks
No.	Title	Length
15.	"Leave a Trace" (Four Tet Remix)	6:49
Total length:		62:03

Extended edition bonus tracks
No.	Title	Length
15.	"Warning Call" (Theme From Mirror's Edge Catalyst)	4:32
16.	"Bury It" (featuring Hayley Williams)	3:08
17.	"Leave a Trace" (Four Tet Remix)	6:49
18.	"Empty Threat" (Big Wild Remix)	3:28
19.	"Clearest Blue" (Gryffin Remix)	4:19
Total length:		82:38

10th anniversary special edition bonus tracks
No.	Title	Length
15.	"Warning Call" (Theme From Mirror's Edge Catalyst)	4:32
16.	"Bury It" (featuring Hayley Williams)	3:08
17.	"Up in Arms"	5:08
18.	"Leave a Trace" (Four Tet Remix)	6:49
19.	"Empty Threat" (Big Wild Remix)	3:28
20.	"Clearest Blue" (Gryffin Remix)	4:19
21.	"Bury It" (Keys N Krates Remix feat. Hayley Williams)	3:50
22.	"Leave a Trace" (Goldroom Remix)	4:59
23.	"Empty Threat" (Whyt Noyz Remix)	8:19
24.	"Clearest Blue" (KDA Remix)	5:02
25.	"Clearest Blue" (Live at Pitchfork Music Festival)	5:20
Total length:		110:10

== Personnel ==
Credits adapted from the liner notes of Every Open Eye.

- Chvrches – production (all tracks); mixing (track 11)
- David Simpson – recording engineering
- Mark "Spike" Stent – mixing (tracks 1–10)
- Geoff Swan – mixing assistance
- Bob Ludwig – mastering
- Danny Clinch – band photography
- Jez Tozer – cover photography
- Amy Burrows – design, art direction

== Charts ==
=== Weekly charts ===
Chart (2015)	Peak position
Australian Albums (ARIA)	3
Austrian Albums (Ö3 Austria)	24
Belgian Albums (Ultratop Flanders)	20
Belgian Albums (Ultratop Wallonia)	38
Canadian Albums (Billboard)	11
Dutch Albums (Album Top 100)	33
French Albums (SNEP)	142
German Albums (Offizielle Top 100)	20
Irish Albums (IRMA)	4
Japanese Albums (Oricon)	53
New Zealand Albums (RMNZ)	10
Scottish Albums (Official Charts)	1
Spanish Albums (Promusicae)	40
Swedish Albums (Sverigetopplistan)	57
Swiss Albums (Schweizer Hitparade)	40
UK Albums (Official Charts)	4
US Billboard 200	8
US Top Alternative Albums (Billboard)	1
US Top Rock Albums (Billboard)	1

Chart (2025)	Peak position
Greek Albums (IFPI)	68

=== Year-end charts ===
Chart (2015)	Position
US Top Rock Albums (Billboard)	64

== Certifications ==
Region	Certification	Certified units/sales
United Kingdom (BPI)	Gold	100,000^{‡}
^{‡} Sales+streaming figures based on certification alone.
