= The Bones of What You Believe =

2013 studio album by Chvrches

Studio album by Chvrches
- Released: 20 September 2013
- Recorded: 2011–2013
- Studios: Alucard, Glasgow
- Genres: Synth-pop; indie pop; electropop; dance-pop
- Length: 48:00
- Labels: Virgin; Goodbye
- Producer: Chvrches

Chvrches chronology
Recover (2013)	The Bones of What You Believe (2013)	Every Open Eye (2015)

Singles from The Bones of What You Believe
- 1. "The Mother We Share" Released: 5 November 2012; 2. "Recover" Released: 6 February 2013; 3. "Gun" Released: 15 July 2013; 4. "Lies" Released: 2 December 2013; 5. "We Sink" Released: 28 March 2014; 6. "Under the Tide" Released: 30 September 2014; 7. "Tether" Released: 29 March 2015

The Bones of What You Believe is the debut studio album by Scottish synth-pop band Chvrches, released on 20 September 2013 by Virgin Records and Goodbye Records. Recorded between 2011 and 2013 in Glasgow, the album was written, composed, and produced by the band as a collaborative effort. It was made available as both a 12-track standard edition and an 18-track special version, the latter including two extra songs, two remixes and two live videos. The album was debuted with a launch party broadcast live on music streaming platform Boiler Room.

== Background and release ==
The album's title derives from a lyric in the song "Strong Hand"; according to frontwoman Lauren Mayberry, it refers to the raw "creativity and effort" that served as the figurative and literal skeleton for the album. Musically, The Bones of What You Believe is primarily a synth-pop and indie pop album that incorporates 1980s influences.

The album spawned seven singles: "The Mother We Share", "Recover", "Gun", "Lies", "We Sink", "Under the Tide" and "Tether", with the lead single becoming a moderate commercial success, charting in the top 10 in Belgium and Japan, as well as the top 40 in the United Kingdom. It also peaked at number 12 on the Alternative Songs chart in the United States.

On 20 October 2023, the 10 Year Anniversary Special Edition of the album was released, which included an additional 4 new tracks and 5 live tracks.

== Commercial success ==
The Bones of What You Believe received critical acclaim, with many complimenting Mayberry's songwriting and vocal performance, and Iain Cook and Martin Doherty's use of synthesisers and vocal loops. The album debuted at number nine on the UK Albums Chart, selling 12,415 copies in its first week. It also reached the top 15 in Australia, Ireland and the United States, and the top 20 in Austria and Canada. The album has sold 152,514 copies in the UK and 184,000 copies in the US. Pitchfork ranked The Bones of What You Believe at number 180 on its list of "The 200 Best Albums of the 2010s".

== Critical reception ==
Professional ratings
Aggregate scores
Source	Rating
AnyDecentMusic?	7.8/10
Metacritic	80/100
Review scores
Source	Rating
AllMusic	5/5 stars
The A.V. Club	A
Entertainment Weekly	B
The Guardian	3/5 stars
The Independent	4/5 stars
Los Angeles Times	3/4 stars
NME	8/10
Pitchfork	8.5/10
Rolling Stone	4/5 stars
Spin	8/10

The Bones of What You Believe received generally positive reviews from music critics. At Metacritic, which assigns a normalised rating out of 100 to reviews from mainstream publications, the album received an average score of 80, based on 39 reviews. Kyle Ryan of The A.V. Club complimented Mayberry's songwriting and wrote that Chvrches "have crafted one of the year's best albums, which means that buzz won't be dying down any time soon." Joe Rivers of Clash lauded the album as "an exceptionally strong debut where every track is a potential single", noting that "not only do CHVRCHES revive the [synth-pop] sound, they push it forward, with wave upon wave of shimmering synths, more hooks than an angling shop and a songwriting acumen that belies the group's relative infancy." Reed Fischer of Alternative Press stated, "The heartbreaking and indignation in Lauren Mayberry's laser-precise voice makes her an imperfect protagonist in the song length dramas found throughout her band's debut", adding that "even more devastation (the building-crushing kind this time) stems from Ian Cook and Martin Doherty's sophisticated and catchy layers of synthesizers and vocal hoops." Larry Fitzmaurice of Pitchfork described the album as "a seamless fusion of emotive theatrics, hook-loaded songwriting, and some of the more forward-thinking sonics in electronic music right now", and found that "the hooks on The Bones of What You Believe are indelible regardless of instrumentation, and the sound is immaculate."

At Spin, Puja Patel opined that the album is "at its best on its revenge tunes", concluding, "In a mainstream landscape that's still reveling in the EDM-fueled fuck-yous of Icona Pop and Charli XCX's 'I Love It,' CHVRCHES' poppy electronic textures and bleakly lyrical brashness raises the bar." Rolling Stone's Jon Dolan expressed, "Even when Chvrches are just competently mopey, their neon-Eighties visions are far from retro pose-striking." Barry Nicolson of NME praised the album's "great songwriting" and felt that "while not every track has the immediacy of 'Lies' or 'Recover', there's not a weak one among them." Heather Phares of AllMusic wrote, "Even on the darkest moments, such as 'Lies' or 'Science/Visions,' there's a disarming emotional directness to The Bones of What You Believe that makes it a unique, fully realized take on a style that seemed close to being played out." Ally Carnwath of The Observer commented that Chvrches are "more robust and melodic than arty peers such as Grimes and Purity Ring—choruses are foregrounded, synthy jabs pummel Lauren Mayberry's vocals, beats drop from satisfying heights—but Mayberry's lyrics also carry a subversive twist of angst and obsession." In a mixed review, Slant Magazine's Kevin Liedel remarked, "While the album has its fair share of sweet spots, the handful of capable melodies never quite balances out its bizarre impulses or the utter lack of thematic unity."

=== Accolades ===
Publication	Accolade	Rank	Ref.
The A.V. Club	The 23 Best Albums of 2013	4	
Billboard	15 Best Albums of 2013	13	
Consequence of Sound	Top 50 Albums of 2013	4	
MusicOMH	Top 100 Albums of 2013	23	
NME	50 Best Albums of 2013	23	
Paste	The 50 Best Albums of 2013	8	
Pitchfork	The Top 50 Albums of 2013	36	
Pitchfork	The 200 Best Albums of the 2010s	180	
PopMatters	The 75 Best Albums of 2013	8	
Rolling Stone	50 Best Albums of 2013	32	
Slant Magazine	The 25 Best Albums of 2013	22	
Stereogum	The 50 Best Albums of 2013	21	

== Track listing ==
All tracks are written by Chvrches, except where noted.

No.	Title	Length
1.	"The Mother We Share"	3:12
2.	"We Sink"	3:34
3.	"Gun"	3:53
4.	"Tether"	4:46
5.	"Lies"	3:41
6.	"Under the Tide"	4:32
7.	"Recover"	3:45
8.	"Night Sky"	3:51
9.	"Science/Visions"	3:58
10.	"Lungs"	3:02
11.	"By the Throat"	4:09
12.	"You Caught the Light"	5:37
Total length:		48:00

German limited edition bonus tracks
No.	Title	Length
13.	"Strong Hand"	3:26
14.	"The Mother We Share" (Errors RMX)	3:17

iTunes Store special edition bonus tracks
No.	Title	Length
13.	"Strong Hand"	3:26
14.	"Broken Bones"	3:44
15.	"Gun" (KDA Remix)	6:15
16.	"The Mother We Share" (We Were Promised Jetpacks Remix)	5:58
17.	"Recover" (live at Village Underground) (video)	4:02
18.	"Lies" (live at Village Underground) (video)	3:59

Japanese edition bonus tracks
No.	Title	Length
13.	"Strong Hand"	3:26
14.	"Broken Bones"	3:44
15.	"Gun" (KDA Remix)	6:15
16.	"The Mother We Share" (We Were Promised Jetpacks Remix)	5:58
17.	"The Mother We Share" (Blood Diamonds Remix)	3:56
18.	"The Mother We Share" (Kowton's Feeling Fragile Remix)	5:01

Target deluxe edition bonus tracks
No.	Title	Writer(s)	Length
13.	"Recover" (Alucard Session)		4:11
14.	"The Mother We Share" (Alucard Session)		3:17
15.	"Gun" (Alucard Session)		4:24
16.	"Tightrope"	Janelle Monáe Robinson; Nathaniel Irvin III; Charles Joseph II; Antwan Patton	3:28

Asian deluxe edition bonus disc
No.	Title	Writer(s)	Length
1.	"Strong Hand"		3:26
2.	"Broken Bones"		3:44
3.	"ZVVL"		3:12
4.	"Now Is Not the Time"		3:45
5.	"Recover" (Alucard Session)		4:12
6.	"The Mother We Share" (Alucard Session)		3:18
7.	"Gun" (Alucard Session)		4:25
8.	"Tightrope" (Alucard Session)		3:30
9.	"Recover" (Cid Rim Remix)		5:48
10.	"It's Not Right but It's Okay"	Rodney Jerkins; Fred Jerkins III; LaShawn Daniels; Isaac Phillips; Toni Estes	3:46
11.	"Recover" (Claire Remix)		4:13
12.	"Lies" (Tourist Remix)		6:32
13.	"Recover" (Kingdom Remix)		3:20
14.	"Tether" (Junior Sanchez Remix)		6:23
15.	"Gun" (KDA Remix)		6:16
16.	"The Mother We Share" (Blood Diamonds Remix)		3:57
17.	"Recover" (KDA Remix)		6:17
18.	"Under the Tide" (radio version)		4:33

10 year anniversary special edition bonus tracks
No.	Title	Length
13.	"Manhattan"	5:19
14.	"White Summer"	4:20
15.	"Talking in My Sleep"	4:32
16.	"City on Fire"	4:38
17.	"We Sink" (Live at Ancienne Belgique)	3:49
18.	"Now Is Not the Time" (Live at Ancienne Belgique)	4:06
19.	"Lies" (Live at Ancienne Belgique)	4:02
20.	"Strong Hand" (Live at Ancienne Belgique)	3:44
21.	"By the Throat" (Live at Ancienne Belgique)	4:32

== Personnel ==
Credits adapted from the liner notes of The Bones of What You Believe.

- Chvrches – production (all tracks); mixing at Wall 2 Wall Recording, Chicago (tracks 4, 11)
- Jonny Scott – drums (tracks 3, 8)
- Rich Costey – mixing at Eldorado Recording Studios, Burbank, California (tracks 1–3, 5–10, 12)
- Chris Kasych – Pro Tools (tracks 1–3, 5–10, 12)
- Martin Cooke – Pro Tools (tracks 1–3, 5–10, 12)
- Bo Hill – mix assistance (tracks 1–3, 5–10, 12)
- Eric Isip – mix assistance (tracks 1–3, 5–10, 12)
- Bob Ludwig – mastering at Gateway Mastering, Portland, Maine
- Amy Burrows – design

== Charts ==
=== Weekly charts ===
Chart (2013)	Peak position
Australian Albums (ARIA)	13
Austrian Albums (Ö3 Austria)	18
Belgian Albums (Ultratop Flanders)	37
Belgian Albums (Ultratop Wallonia)	70
Canadian Albums (Billboard)	19
Dutch Albums (Album Top 100)	68
German Albums (Offizielle Top 100)	22
Irish Albums (IRMA)	12
Japanese Albums (Oricon)	59
New Zealand Albums (RMNZ)	35
Norwegian Albums (VG-lista)	28
Scottish Albums (Official Charts)	5
Swiss Albums (Schweizer Hitparade)	55
UK Albums (Official Charts)	9
US Billboard 200	12
US Independent Albums (Billboard)	1
US Top Alternative Albums (Billboard)	3
US Top Rock Albums (Billboard)	5

=== Year-end charts ===
Chart (2014)	Position
US Independent Albums (Billboard)	34
US Top Rock Albums (Billboard)	71

== Certifications and sales ==
Region	Certification	Certified units/sales
United Kingdom (BPI)	Gold	152,514
United States	—	184,000
Summaries
Worldwide	—	500,000

== Release history ==
Region	Date	Format	Edition	Label	Ref.
Australia	20 September 2013	CD	Standard	Liberation	
Australia	20 September 2013	Digital download	Standard; special	Liberation	
Germany	20 September 2013	CD	Limited	Vertigo Berlin	
Germany	20 September 2013	LP	Standard	Vertigo Berlin	
Germany	20 September 2013	Digital download	Limited; special	Vertigo Berlin	
Ireland	20 September 2013	CD	Standard	Virgin; Goodbye	
Ireland	20 September 2013	Digital download	Standard; special	Virgin; Goodbye	
France	23 September 2013	Digital download	Standard; special	Mercury	
Italy	23 September 2013	Digital download	Standard; special	Universal	
United Kingdom	23 September 2013	CD; LP	Standard	Virgin; Goodbye	
United Kingdom	23 September 2013	Digital download	Standard; special	Virgin; Goodbye	
United States	24 September 2013	CD; LP	Standard	Glassnote	
United States	24 September 2013	Digital download	Standard; special	Glassnote	
Japan	24 September 2013	Digital download	Standard; special	Hostess	
Japan	25 September 2013	CD	Standard	Hostess	
France	7 October 2013	CD; LP	Standard	Mercury	
Italy	15 October 2013	CD	Standard	Universal	
