= Iain Cook =

Scottish musician (born 1974)

- Cook performing with Chvrches in 2018
- Born: Iain Andrew Cook; 2 November 1974 (age 52); Falkirk, Stirlingshire, Scotland
- Education: University of Strathclyde
- Occupations: Musician; composer; songwriter; record producer
- Years active: 1996–present
- Works: Discography
- Awards: Full list
- Musical career
- Origin: Whitburn, West Lothian, Scotland
- Genres: Synth-pop; electropop; indie pop; pop; indietronica
- Instruments: Guitar; bass; keyboards; sampler
- Member of: Chvrches; Protection
- Formerly of: Aereogramme; The Unwinding Hours; Les Tinglies
- Website: chvrch.es

Iain Andrew Cook (born 2 November 1974) is a Scottish musician, composer, record producer, and member of synthpop band Chvrches, with whom he has achieved critical and commercial success. He was previously a member of Scottish bands Aereogramme and the Unwinding Hours.

== Early life ==
Cook was born on 2 November 1974 in Falkirk, and grew up in Whitburn, Scotland. He attended the University of Strathclyde in Glasgow, where he met future bandmate Martin Doherty in 2003.

== Career ==
=== Early work ===
Cook, using the alias Johnny Dymes, was a member of Les Tinglies in the 1990s. In 1998, Cook founded Aereogramme with Craig B., Campbell McNeil and Martin Scott. The band released their debut album A Story in White in 2001, through the Chemikal Underground record label. A Story in White was followed by the studio albums Sleep and Release (2003), Seclusion (2004), and their final album My Heart Has a Wish That You Would Not Go (2007); they disbanded the same year. Cook then formed the Unwinding Hours with Craig B. in 2008; releasing two studio albums before disbanding in 2013.

=== Chvrches ===
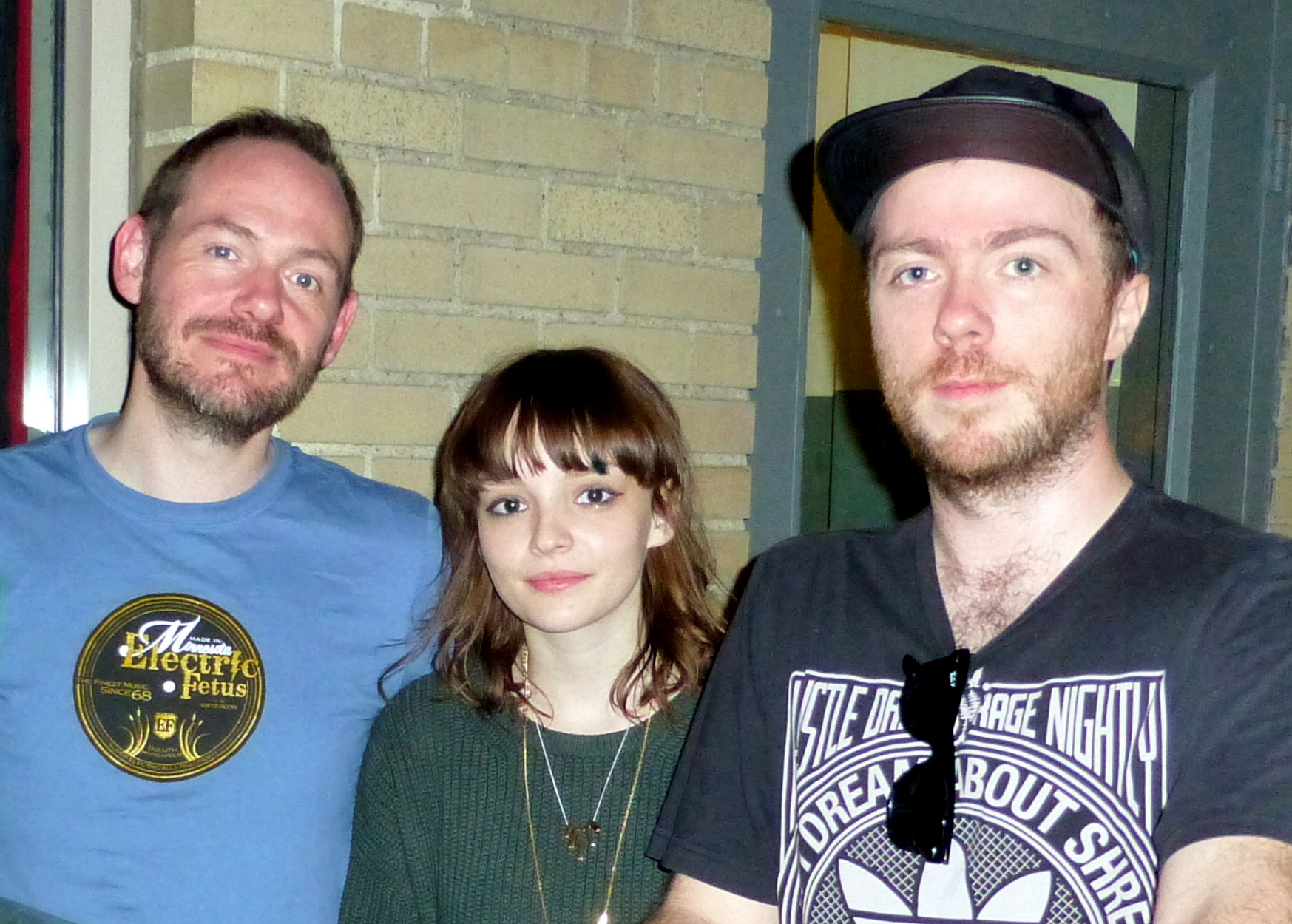
Cook (left) with Chvrches bandmates Lauren Mayberry (centre) and Martin Doherty (right) in 2014

Cook became interested in the electronic sound of the band Emeralds soon after Aereogramme's disbandment. He bought a Minimoog Voyager and began "playing around with soundscapes and stuff like that ... kind of with a view of doing stuff from the '80s". Cook's friend and former Aereogramme bandmate Martin Doherty was dissatisfied while a member of the Twilight Sad; he and Cook soon reconnected and decided to form a music project. In September 2011, Cook had produced an EP for the band Blue Sky Archives; he invited vocalist and drummer Lauren Mayberry to join the project. In early recording sessions, Cook produced the band's songs.

Cook has played synthesizers, piano, guitars, bass and provided backing vocals for Chvrches since their formation in 2011. They have released four studio albums to date: The Bones of What You Believe (2013), Every Open Eye (2015), Love Is Dead (2018), and Screen Violence (2021).

=== Other work ===
Cook wrote the theme tune for One Life Left, the long running video game radio show which began in 2006. In October 2022, he unveiled a new side project called Protection with Sons and Daughters guitarist Scott Paterson.

== Personal life ==
Cook is currently in a relationship with Scottish actress Morven Christie.

== Discography ==
With Aereogramme

- A Story in White (2001)
- Sleep and Release (2003)
- Seclusion (2004)
- My Heart Has a Wish That You Would Not Go (2007)

With The Unwinding Hours

- The Unwinding Hours (2010)
- Afterlives (2012)

With Chvrches

- The Bones of What You Believe (2013)
- Every Open Eye (2015)
- Love Is Dead (2018)
- Screen Violence (2021)

With Protection

- SEEDS I (2023)
- SEEDS II (2023)

As producer

- Traces by Karine Polwart (2012)
